= 2017 in American television =

In American television in 2017, notable events included television show debuts, finales, and cancellations; channel launches, closures, and re-brandings; stations changing or adding their network affiliations; and information about controversies and carriage disputes.

== Notable events ==
=== January ===
Date	Event	Source
1	Hearst Television stations in 26 markets are removed from DirecTV due to the companies failing to reach a new retransmission contract. The stations are restored on January 6 with a new retrans agreement.	
1	WBTS-LD (a former translator of Merrimack, New Hampshire-licensed Telemundo O&O WNEU) signs on as Boston's NBC owned-and-operated station with a rebroadcast of the city's First Night New Year's Eve festivities, replacing Sunbeam Television-owned WHDH, which ended its 68-year tenure as a network affiliate. The switch comes after parent company Comcast (which acquired the station from ZGS Communications in September 2016) announced that it will launch an NBC O&O station in the Boston market after WHDH failed to renew its affiliation contract with the network.	
2–13	Former Today anchors Katie Couric and Meredith Vieira rejoin Matt Lauer on the Today anchor desk, with Couric appearing the week of January 2 and Viera the week of January 9. The appearances are to help fete Lauer's 20th anniversary on the NBC morning news/talk show, to help fill the void left by current co-anchor Savannah Guthrie's maternity leave, and to mark Today's 65th anniversary.	
3	NBC News announces the hiring of Megyn Kelly from Fox News, where she was host of The Kelly File (which aired its last edition on January 6). At NBC, she would host a daytime news and discussion program, which would be Megyn Kelly Today replacing the existing Today's Take format of the third hour of Today, and a Sunday newsmagazine called Sunday Night with Megyn Kelly.	
4	The FCC approves a waiver in regulations allowing Mexican media company Televisa to increase its ownership stake in Univision Communications from 10% to 40%. This waiver of the 1934 law, which applies only to any Televisa/Univision transaction (foreign ownership in any U.S. communications company is limited to 25%), will allow Televisa to expand its long-sought control of Univision, which has sought out ways to stay financially competitive.	
5	As part of a new contract with ESPN, Chris Berman announced he will step down from his role as host of the network's NFL studio programming, as well as the Major League Baseball Home Run Derby. The sportscaster, who has been with the network from its inception in 1979, will stay on as a commentator for Monday Night Countdown and call the MLB Division Series for ESPN Radio.	
5	Former Fox News anchor Greta Van Susteren is hired by rival MSNBC, where she will host For the Record with Greta, an early-evening news and analysis show based in Washington, D.C. Van Susteren's program, debuting on January 9, replaces the rebroadcast of Bloomberg Television's With All Due Respect, which ended in December 2016. The program only lasts just over six months, and Van Susteren departs MSNBC on June 29 due to the network deciding to go in a different direction.	
6	Hearst Television announces that it had acquired a majority stake in Charleston, South Carolina-based Litton Entertainment, which controls four of the five E/I-compliant Saturday morning blocks on the five major broadcast networks, along with being a syndicator of traditional programming, for an undisclosed amount. The deal was closed on February 1.	
8	The motion picture La La Land (with a record seven wins, including best musical/comedy film) and TV newcomers Atlanta and The Crown (best comedy/musical and drama series, respectively) are among the notable winners at the 74th Golden Globe Awards. Jimmy Fallon emcees the ceremony on NBC.	
12	C-SPAN's live coverage of a United States House of Representatives debate abruptly switches for 10 minutes to a live feed of RT. Although fears are suggested that the feed was hijacked by pro-Russian hackers, C-SPAN initially believes it was due to an internal routing error.	
12	Former HBO employee Jennifer Choi is sentenced to 30 months in prison after admitting to bilking nearly $1 million from the network over a six-year period (2008–2014). Choi had worked in talent relations for HBO, and pleaded guilty in January 2016 to charges of wire fraud and tax evasion. She admitted to submitting invoices and reaping money for services never rendered by a shell company she controlled, as well as charging $63,000 to HBO's account for car service bills for her family and friends. Choi also faces three years of post-jail supervised release and must also pay restitution to HBO and back taxes.	
15	An audience of 48.5 million watch Fox's live broadcast of the National Football Conference divisional round game between the Green Bay Packers and Dallas Cowboys, one marked by Packers kicker Mason Crosby's game-ending, game-winning 51-yard field goal. The audience for the telecast is the largest ever for an NFL divisional round game, outdrawing last season's NFC Championship game (45.7 million) and falling just behind 2015's NFC title game (49.8 million).	
16	After a 19-month hiatus, Bob Beckel returns to Fox News as co-host of The Five. Beckel, who joined FNC in 2000 as a political contributor and is one of the original co-hosts of the early-evening political opinion program since its 2011 debut, left the program in 2015 to join CNN as a commentator. Current co-host Juan Williams, who will continue to appear on The Five, will remain as Fox News contributor across all programs. Beckel departs Fox News again on May 19, this time involuntarily, for refusing to allow an African-American FNC IT employee to service his personal computer and directing racial remarks towards the man.	
17	Almost a full year after the deal was first announced, due in part to delays in license transfer approvals caused by the agency's auction of broadcast spectrum to telecommunications providers, and six days after the FCC gives its approval, Nexstar Broadcasting Group completes its $4.6 billion acquisition of Media General. The combined company, now known as Nexstar Media Group, includes a portfolio of 171 full-power stations, covering 100 markets (including 16 of the top 50,) and nearly 39% of the U.S. Among these stations, MyNetworkTV affiliate KRON-TV/San Francisco becomes Nexstar's largest station by market size and its second to be based in a top-10 market (after WHAG-TV/Hagerstown, Maryland, which is licensed within the Washington, D.C., market).	
17	On the same day Dish Network reaches a retransmission deal to avert a blackout of Gray Television's stations, the lack of a new carriage pact leads to the removal of 12 Bonten Media Group stations in eight markets from the satellite service.	
17	Shark Tank host Kevin O'Leary announces on his Facebook page that he will return to his native Canada to run for the leadership post of that country's Conservative Party, a role equivalent to a U.S. presidential candidate. O'Leary withdrew from the race and endorsed a fellow leadership candidate on April 26.	
18	Britney Spears (four awards) and Ellen DeGeneres (three awards, enough to make her the most awarded in the show's history) are among the notable winners at the 43rd People's Choice Awards. Joel McHale hosted the telecast on CBS.	
20	Former TV personality Donald Trump is inaugurated as the 45th President of the United States.	
22	Several contributors to Fox News are cut from the network, including longtime contributors George Will and former Fox News Watch panelist Cal Thomas, along with Ed Rollins, former U.S. Senator Alphonse D'Amato and actress Stacey Dash, who was a regular panelist on Outnumbered and had made several controversial statements.	
29	The Miss Universe 2016 pageant is held at the Mall of Asia Arena in Pasay, Metro Manila, Philippines and broadcast on Fox and Azteca, with Steve Harvey as host. Iris Mittenaere of France is selected as the winner, ending a 63-year drought for the country, when Christiane Martel took the title in 1953. This marked the second time that the pageant skipped a year since the Miss Universe 2014, which was held in Miami, Florida in January 2015.	
29	NBC special correspondent Tom Brokaw celebrates his 50th anniversary at NBC News with a two-hour special episode of Dateline NBC, titled Tom Brokaw at NBC News: The First 50 Years, which featured footage from some of his most memorable interviews and highlights in his career (including his coverage of the Watergate scandal, the fall of the Berlin Wall, and several presidential campaigns), as well as in-depth conversations with guests including Oprah Winfrey, Bill Gates, Tom Hanks, Jon Stewart, Lin-Manuel Miranda, Colin Powell and David Letterman. Brokaw joined NBC News as a West Coast correspondent and anchor of NBC O&O KNBC/Los Angeles from 1966 to 1972 before becoming a White House correspondent (1973–1976) and anchor of Today (1976–1981) and NBC Nightly News (1982–2004).	
31	With one final ESPN assignment on this date (a Georgia/Kentucky men's basketball game), Brent Musburger ends his nearly 50-year TV sportscasting career.	

=== February ===
Date	Event	Source
1	The networks and owned-and-operated television stations of Univision Communications are removed from Charter/Spectrum systems nationwide due to an ongoing retransmission dispute between the companies. The next day, a judge overseeing a carriage fee lawsuit between the two companies orders the Univision channels to be restored on Charter/Spectrum. The companies later agree to temporarily keep the channels on Charter/Spectrum until at least June.	
2	The National Women's Soccer League announced a three-year agreement with A&E Networks, in which Lifetime broadcasts 22 regular-season matches as the NWSL Game of the Week at 4 p.m. Eastern on Saturday afternoons, as well as three post-season matches. This marked the first time that the NWSL had a weekly broadcast window throughout the entire season. Players also wear a sleeve patch of the network's logo on their uniforms. As part of the deal, A&E Networks also purchased a 25% equity stake in the NWSL, were granted two seats on the league's board, and formed a joint venture with the league known as NWSL Media to oversee the league's marketing and broadcast rights. This deal marked the first time Lifetime had broadcast sports since the WNBA in the late 1990s and early 2000s.	
5	Super Bowl LI airs on Fox in English and on Fox Deportes in Spanish, with 111.3 million viewers watching the New England Patriots come back from a 25-point 3rd quarter deficit to defeat the Atlanta Falcons in the first Super Bowl to go into overtime. Lady Gaga is the headliner in the halftime show, a critically acclaimed performance that draws 117.5 million viewers, the fourth consecutive year the halftime show outdraws the Super Bowl itself. Two noteworthy ads that debut that make light of U.S. President Donald Trump's signing of executive orders that ban travelers from several Muslim nations and orders a physical wall to be built between Mexico and the United States. An ad for Budweiser beer depicts Anheuser-Busch co-founder Adolphus Busch's emigration to the United States from Germany and his first meeting with Eberhard Anheuser, while one for 84 Lumber depicts a mother and daughter journeying from Mexico to the United States, a shorter version of a full ad made available online, after Fox rejected the full version for being overtly political.	
6	Fox affiliate WFXG/Augusta, Georgia begins migrating production of its news programming in-house with the debut of a 3 1/2-hour weekday morning newscast that is produced out of expanded space at the station's studios in nearby Martinez. The Raycom Media station had been outsourcing its newscasts since 2004, when it premiered a 10:00 p.m. broadcast produced under an agreement with ABC affiliate WJBF. After WJBF took over the news operations of NBC affiliate WAGT through a since-discontinued shared services agreement between their respective ex-owners Media General and Schurz Communications in October 2011, production of the program's in-studio segments transferred to CBS-affiliated sister WTOC-TV/Savannah, with WFXG maintaining a limited staff of Augusta-based multimedia journalists to file field reports. WTOC will continue to produce all studio segments for the prime time newscast in the interim until WFXG expands its news staff.	
9	Bob Costas announces during a live interview on Today that he will step down as prime time host of NBC's Olympic Games coverage and Sunday Night Football, duties he has held for NBC Sports since 1992 and 2006, respectively. Costas will hand the duties to Mike Tirico, who joined NBC Sports in 2016 after a quarter century at ESPN, beginning with the 2018 Winter Olympics in Pyeongchang, South Korea.	
9	Viacom announces a plan to realign its cable television division to focus on six core channels: MTV, Nickelodeon, the Nick Jr. Channel, Comedy Central, BET, and Spike, the latter of which would be rebranded to the Paramount Network in early 2018.	
11	Alec Baldwin hosts Saturday Night Live for the 17th time, setting the record for the most appearances as the show's guest host, having made his first appearance in 1990. The episode was Baldwin's first time hosting during the 42nd season, after having appeared as Donald Trump in several sketches in most of the season's episodes to date, succeeding Darrell Hammond. This episode – which also featured performances by musical guest Ed Sheeran and a special guest appearance by Melissa McCarthy as White House Press Secretary Sean Spicer in the cold open – delivered a 3.10 rating and an audience of 10.843 million, the largest for the NBC late night live television sketch comedy and variety show since the January 8, 2011 episode hosted by Jim Carrey with musical guest The Black Keys.	
12	Adele, despite dropping an obscenity while asking for a do over during a tribute to George Michael, emerges as the winner Album, Record, and Song of the Year categories, for 25 and "Hello", respectively, David Bowie, with five posthumous wins, all for his final album Blackstar, Chance the Rapper (Best New Artist, the first unsigned artist to win in this category), and Twenty One Pilots (who accepted their win in the Pop Duo performance category for "Stressed Out" while wearing underwear), are among the notable winners at the 59th Grammy Awards. James Corden hosts the event, which airs on CBS. Other major performances during the telecast include pregnant two-time winner Beyoncé ("Love Drought" and "Sandcastles"), Lady Gaga with Metallica ("Moth into Flame"), Katy Perry ("Chained to the Rhythm", while the U.S. constitution is displayed in the background), The Time with Bruno Mars with a tribute to Prince, and a controversial performance by A Tribe Called Quest with Anderson Paak, Busta Rhymes, and Consequence attacking Donald Trump's travel ban while performing "We the People...."	
13	Nick Cannon announces he will not return as host of America's Got Talent, citing creative differences between him and executives at NBC. The resignation comes in the wake of news that the network considered firing Cannon, who hosted the variety competition for eight seasons, after he made disparaging remarks about NBC in a then-recent Showtime comedy special, Stand Up, Don't Shoot. "I love art and entertainment too much to watch it be ruined by controlling corporations and big business," Cannon said in a statement, referencing cable giant Comcast's ownership of NBC.	
15	KSWL-LD/Lake Charles, Louisiana signs on the air as the market's CBS affiliate, returning the network to Lake Charles for the first time since KTAG-TV ceased operations in 1961. Prior to the sign-on, viewers in the market could only receive CBS programming via KLFY-TV/Lafayette and KFDM-TV/Beaumont, Texas. Shortly after KSWL made its debut, its owner, Waypoint Media, also acquired KWWE-LD, which is converted into a MyNetworkTV affiliate (with MeTV on its LD2 subchannel).	
16	Gray Television announces its intent to purchase CBS affiliate WABI-TV/Bangor, Maine and ABC affiliate WCJB/Gainesville, Florida from Diversified Communications for $85 million. The deal, which marks Diversified's exit from broadcasting once the purchase receives FCC approval, ends WABI's status as the oldest continuously family-owned station in the U.S. and reunites the station with fellow CBS outlet WAGM-TV/Presque Isle, which Diversified had owned from 1971 to 1984 and was eventually sold to Gray in 2015.	
19	Discussion forums on The Internet Movie Database (IMDb) are shuttered. The Amazon-owned platform, which catalogs a database of films, television, and performers, announced the move on February 3, citing the migration of entertainment discussions to social media as well as the disruption of user experiences and user ratings by internet trolls.	
19	NBC celebrates its 90th anniversary of broadcasting with a three-hour special, The Paley Center Salutes NBC's 90th Anniversary. Hosted by Kelsey Grammer, the program features a look back at NBC's most well-known programs and recorded interviews with the network's past and present talents. The network began its operations in 1926 as a radio network when it was founded by former owner Radio Corporation of America (RCA), and launched its television service in 1941 with the launch of an experimental television station that later became its New York City flagship WNBC-TV.	
23	The FCC issues a Notice of Proposed Rulemaking that authorizes broadcasters to utilize ATSC 3.0, the second generation of the digital television broadcast standard that enables television stations to provide improved better management of offer features such as ultra-high-definition content, enhanced bandwidth and compression efficiency, datacasting, targeted advertising and upgrades to the Emergency Alert System. Unlike with the transition to the current ATSC 1.0 standard, broadcasters could adopt the standard voluntarily and does not require television and mobile phone manufacturers to include tuning capability for viewers to receive the signals nor employ government subsidies for consumers to make the transition. The rules were put into place despite concerns about issues concerning requirements that pay television providers carry 1.0 and 3.0 signals of participating stations at the expense of other channels, effects on consumers and voluntary broadcaster adoption of the standard.	
23	The Meredith Corporation announces that it will acquire the license assets of independent station WPCH-TV/Atlanta from the Turner Broadcasting System for $70 million. The sale was reportedly done to expedite Turner parent Time Warner's merger with AT&T. Turner Broadcasting founder Ted Turner purchased the station (then WJRJ) in 1970, and uplinked it to satellite in December 1976, making it the first national superstation – later known as TBS – and the first basic cable channel in the U.S. The Atlanta station was separated from the national TBS feed in October 2007, after the latter acquired partial national cable rights to air Major League Baseball games (TBS' Atlanta Braves game telecasts were relegated to WPCH for exclusive local broadcast thereafter, before Fox Sports South fully assumed the regional television rights in 2013). The transaction received FCC approval on April 17, and was completed four days later on April 21.	
26	La La Land (six awards) and Moonlight (Best Picture) are among the notable winners at the 89th Academy Awards. Jimmy Kimmel hosts the event, which airs on ABC. In an infamous moment, La La Land is accidentally announced as Best Picture winner, after presenters Warren Beatty and Faye Dunaway are mistakenly given the envelope disclosing La La Land's Emma Stone as Best Actress winner; La La Land producer Jordan Horowitz interrupted to clarify that Moonlight was the actual winner. PricewaterhouseCoopers, the accounting firm which secures the envelopes, later issued a sincere apology for the error and promise to investigate it. It was reported the man who handed Beatty the envelope was tweeting a picture he took of Stone with her trophy instead of concentrating on his duties. In addition, ESPN (through its in-house film division) is given the first Oscar for Best Documentary Feature ever awarded to a sports-centric broadcaster, as well as the first longest-running documentary or motion picture to achieve this feat (clocking in at 7 hours and 47 minutes), for its 30 for 30 miniseries feature O.J.: Made in America. History is also made for streaming services Netflix, which scored its first win with the Syrian-produced documentary short The White Helmets, and Amazon Studios with Manchester by the Sea for Best Original Screenplay (Kenneth Lonergan) and Best Actor (Casey Affleck); the first-ever film released by a digital streaming service to be nominated for Best Picture, and The Salesman (for Best Foreign Language Film; Amazon holds U.S. rights to the Iranian/French-produced film). The ceremony, which runs for three hours and 49 minutes (the longest telecast in 10 years), delivered an overnight 22.4 rating and 32.9 million total viewers, the lowest viewership average for the ceremony since the 2008 telecast.	

=== March ===
Date	Event	Source
1	Aiming to improve U.S./Mexico relations in the wake of U.S. President Donald Trump's controversial executive order proposing a wall on the countries' border and mass deportations of illegal Mexican immigrants, Conan O'Brien takes his TBS talk show to Mexico. The special episode, titled "Conan Without Borders: Made in Mexico" and taped with all-Mexican guests, crew and audience at Televisa's Mexico City studios, features as guests actor/producer/director Diego Luna, former Mexican President Vicente Fox, and Top Chef Mexico Judge Aquiles Chavez, as well as O'Brien's attending a Quinceañera and unsuccessfully soliciting donations to fund the wall in person-on-the-street segments.	
3	Hearst Television stations in 26 markets (including Boston, Baltimore, Kansas City, Orlando, Sacramento and New Orleans) are removed from Dish Network due to the companies failing to reach a new retransmission contract, despite a 48-hour extension granted by Hearst to extend negotiations to renew the contract that formally expired on March 1. Representatives for Dish stated that the company had agreed to accept the same terms that DirecTV had reached Hearst after the two companies had renewed their carriage agreement in January, which Hearst felt was less acceptable, given that Dish has only half the total audience reach of its satellite rival. The Hearst signals return to Dish on April 26.	
8	By a 91–21 margin (with 12 other ballots challenged or uncounted) in NLRB-administered balloting, actors employed by Telemundo for the Spanish-language network's scripted programming vote to unionize with SAG-AFTRA, bringing a close to a 15-year labor dispute between the entertainers' union and Telemundo parent NBCUniversal. SAG-AFTRA had argued that NBCUniversal maintains a double standard by allowing its English-language performers to unionize while refusing the same right to Spanish-speaking actors. The move marks the first time in which a Spanish-language television broadcaster has allowed to have its employers to become part of a labor union.	
16	Entravision Communications announces that it will purchase Action Channel affiliate KMCC/Laughlin, Nevada from Beam Tilt, LLC (a subsidiary of Chicago-based Cranston Acquisition LLC) for $3.75 million. The sale will create a triopoly with Entravision's existing Las Vegas stations, Univision affiliate KINC and UniMás affiliate KELV-LD (Laughlin is part of the Las Vegas market), and the second full-power duopoly in the market (after Sinclair Broadcast Group-owned NBC affiliate KSNV and CW affiliate KVCW); the deal complies with current FCC duopoly regulations as neither station is among the Las Vegas market's four highest-rated and the market will have more than eight independent station owners once the sale is finalized.	
21	Fox News suspends legal analyst Andrew Napolitano from on-air appearances after he makes a bogus claim that the British spy agency Government Communications Headquarters had illegally wire tapped Trump Tower at the request of outgoing President Barack Obama during the 2016 US presidential election. Napolitano, still standing by his claims, returns to Fox News' air on March 29.	
27–31	Five colleges and universities visited by NBC personality Al Roker set new Guinness-verified world records on live television as part of its week-long special series Rokerthon 3: Storming Into The Madness, which aired on the network's morning news/talk show, Today. The special series began at University of Oklahoma in Norman, Oklahoma and concluded at Roker's alma mater, SUNY Oswego in Oswego, New York.	
31	After a 16-month absence, Comcast restores YES Network to its cable systems in New Jersey, Connecticut and Pennsylvania, in the wake of the sides resolving a carriage dispute, in which Comcast accused the 21st Century Fox-Yankee Global Enterprises regional sports network venture of asking for an estimated 33% hike in subscriber fees to continue carrying the channel.	

=== April ===
Date	Event	Source
4	Raycom Media announces its intent to purchase a majority interest in Fox affiliate WVUE-DT/New Orleans from Tom Benson (owner of the New Orleans Saints and New Orleans Pelicans, who will retain a partial stake in WVUE once the deal is completed) for $51.8 million. The acquisition bridges a relationship that the Montgomery, Alabama-based group has had with WVUE since 2013, when Benson's Louisiana Media Company (which bought the station from Emmis Communications for $41 million in May 2008) decided to transfer its operations to Raycom under joint sales and shared services agreements that included a put option – which Benson exercised on February 6 – for Raycom to eventually acquire the license. It will also give Raycom its fourth owned-and-operated station in Louisiana, joining CBS affiliates KSLA/Shreveport and WAFB/Baton Rouge, and NBC affiliate KPLC/Lake Charles. The acquisition was finalized on August 8.New	
4	After announcing his retirement from the National Football League as a player, former Dallas Cowboys quarterback Tony Romo is named the lead commentator for CBS Sports' coverage of the professional league, serving as color analyst alongside current lead play-by-play host Jim Nantz. Under the league's contract with CBS, he will also cover the network's Thursday Night Football telecasts, which Amazon Prime acquires streaming rights to (along with NBC games) on the same day for $50 million, or five times what Twitter paid the previous year.	
5	Metro-Goldwyn-Mayer buys out Lionsgate and Paramount Pictures's combined 80.91% ownership stakes in premium cable channel Epix for $1.03 billion. Under the terms of the deal, Paramount and Lionsgate – both of which co-founded Epix in conjunction with MGM in 2009, following a contract negotiation dispute with Showtime over film rights fees – will continue to allow Epix to hold the pay television rights to their theatrical feature films under multi-year distribution agreements. Lionsgate and Paramount parent Viacom had been looking at a possible sale of Epix since the fall of 2016, after Lionsgate purchased pay cable rival Starz in June of that year, and Viacom sought strategic opportunities to pay down its debt of $12 billion and streamlined its operations by shifting focus on restructuring Paramount and the Viacom Media Networks cable channels.	
5	YouTube enters the over-the-top MVPD field with the rollout of YouTube TV, which initially launches in New York City, Los Angeles, the San Francisco Bay Area, Philadelphia and Chicago. Announced on February 28, the service offers live streams of programming from the five major broadcast networks (ABC, CBS, NBC, Fox and The CW), as well as a slate of approximately 40 cable channels owned by NBCUniversal, CBS Corporation, 21st Century Fox and The Walt Disney Company (including among others USA Network, Disney Channel, FX and ESPN, with Showtime and Fox Soccer Plus available as add-ons for an extra fee) and access to YouTube Red original content. The lineup is smaller than the more than 100 channels offered by AT&T's DirecTV Now, and does not include channels owned by major groups like Viacom, Time Warner, Discovery Communications, A+E Networks or AMC Networks. Features will include the ability to create up of six user account profiles per a single subscription (with separate log-ins and access to three simultaneous streams per account) and a cloud DVR with unlimited storage that can retain recorded programming for nine months after their original airdate.	
5	Max Media files an FCC application announcing its intent to sell NBC-primary/CBS-subchannel affiliate WNKY/Bowling Green to Marquee Broadcasting for $5.6 million. Following expected approval of the sale, Fox affiliate WPFO/Waterville-Portland, Maine will temporarily become the sole television station in Max Media's portfolio, until its sale of the license to Cunningham Broadcasting (whose partner company, Sinclair Broadcast Group, already maintains a shared services agreement with WPFO) is completed.	
6	PepsiCo pulls a controversial ad titled Live for Now that contained Kendall Jenner marching through a crowd of Black Lives Matter protestors to give a white police officer a can of Pepsi, stating "Pepsi was trying to project a global message of unity, peace and understanding. Clearly we missed the mark, and we apologize. We did not intend to make light of any serious issue. We are removing the content and halting any further rollout. We also apologize for putting Kendall Jenner in this position."	
10	The Sesame Street episode "Meet Julia" premieres on both HBO and PBS.	
13	PBS member station and a Public Organization KQED/San Francisco pays spectrum around $95.4 million for relinquishing back to the Federal Communications Commission (FCC) for their future stations.	
15	Beginning with this night's broadcast (with host Jimmy Fallon and musical guest Harry Styles, the last four episodes of the season for NBC's Saturday Night Live are carried live for the first time across all four time zones in the Contiguous United States In the Pacific Time Zone, the show's regular time spot becomes a rerun for that night's New episode. The show is delayed as usual after late local newscasts on affiliates in Alaska, Hawaii, Guam and the Mariana Islands), along with all of Canada on simulcasting network Global. The March 16 announcement of the nationwide live broadcast of the 42nd season's remaining episodes came one week after NBC announced that it will also bring back SNL Weekend Update Thursday in August. The practice stays in place for future following seasons.	
18	AT&T signs a deal with Fox Networks Group to add live feeds of 14 Fox-affiliated stations owned by Tribune Media (serving markets such as Denver, San Diego, Kansas City, St. Louis, Cleveland and Seattle) to DirecTV Now, beginning April 24. The Tribune-owned Fox affiliates join the network's 17 owned-and-operated stations, bringing the number of Fox stations offering linear streams on the AT&T-owned virtual MVPD service to 31. The deal – which will make DirecTV Now the second virtual MVPD provider, after PlayStation Vue (which carries CBS affiliates owned by various groups as well as a limited selection of ABC, NBC, and Fox-affiliated stations), to offer affiliates not owned by their corresponding network – is part of a strategy by the Big Three networks to offer their local stations on new and existing virtual MVPD services through opt-in digital rights agreements with their various affiliate groups.	
19	21st Century Fox announces it has fired of Fox News personality Bill O'Reilly. A popular part of Fox News since its 1996 launch, O'Reilly's firing (and his reported $25 million severance) came after more than 85 sponsors pulled their advertisements from The O'Reilly Factor (the network's highest-rated program), on the heels of legal documents uncovered by The New York Times surrounding sexual harassment allegations against O'Reilly, in which he and Fox News—which had reached a deal to extend O'Reilly's contract earlier in the month—paid settlements totaling about $13 million to five women. The move creates a shakeup in FNC's lineup: on April 24, Tucker Carlson Tonight will take Factor's 8:00 p.m. Eastern time slot; late-afternoon show The Five will move to Carlson's 9:00 p.m. slot; Fox News Specialists would debut in Five's former slot on May 1.	
20	In a 2–1 party-line vote, the FCC restores the 50% discount on calculating a station owner's national coverage by factoring the broadcast coverage of UHF stations (physical channels 14 to 51). The restoration of the 1985 rulemaking – which was abolished in a similar party-line vote led by former FCC chair Tom Wheeler in September 2016, on the basis that reception of UHF signals became superior to those operating on the VHF band with the advent of digital television – will allow ownership groups to surpass the still-in-place 39% nationwide household cap, potentially allowing them reach up to 78% of all U.S. markets. The move comes despite Democratic opposition from House Minority Leader Nancy Pelosi and House Committee on Energy and Commerce ranking member Frank Pallone, who jointly authored a letter in advance of the vote, condemning the discount's reinstatement as re-opening a loophole to allow broadcasters – including companies with already large station portfolios such as Sinclair Broadcast Group, which Pelosi and Pallone cited in the letter regarding reports of Sinclair's interest in acquiring Tribune Media, and Nexstar Media Group – to acquire additional television stations with a "blunt, illogical and anti-consumer instrument".	
21	In the first deal announced after the FCC's restoration of the UHF discount, a move seen as a likely catalyst toward station ownership consolidation, Sinclair Broadcast Group announces it will purchase the fourteen television stations owned by Bonten Media Group in eight markets for $240 million. At approximately 25%, with the discount, the deal – which is pending FCC approval – will only add 1% of coverage to Sinclair's national market reach (without the discount, Sinclair's national reach will exceed the current national cap at 39.6%). Fox affiliate WFXI/Greenville, North Carolina is exempted from the deal, as that station's spectrum had been sold in the FCC incentive auction for $42.1 million (Fox programming will remain available in the market via WFXI satellite station WYDO).	
21	In a ruling on a copyright infringement lawsuit first filed in 2015, the U.S. District Court for the Eastern District of Virginia orders the shutdown of Shava TV and Cres TV, two over-the-top services founded by Imran and Naeem Butt, which sold set-top boxes transmitting several Arabic and South Asian entertainment networks (such as Sony Entertainment Television Asia, Star Plus, Zee TV, ARY Digital, ATN Bangla, MBC and Al Jazeera) through peer-to-peer networks to U.S. residents, after determining that the companies violated copyright law by distributing the networks and using their logos without permission. The case's plaintiffs (led by Dish Network and several of the aforementioned networks, which are also members of the International Broadcaster Coalition Against Piracy) were awarded $25.65 million in damages.	
24	ABC announces the launch of the ABC Clearinghouse initiative, a digital MVPD venture that brings 160 affiliate stations (among them coming from broadcasters such as Sinclair Broadcast Group, the E.W. Scripps Company, Hearst Television, and Tegna), including its eight O&Os (about 90% of the country) to an emerging platform as a chance to opt-in to a uniform carriage deal template negotiated by network executives in an effort to ensure that the network has a robust presence. The initiative will also utilize ABC programming via the ABC app and TV Everywhere, along with live streaming carriage pacts with DirecTV Now, PlayStation Vue, YouTube TV, CenturyLink, Hulu, Amazon (the latter two of which are planning services that will include this deal upon the announced launches of their virtual MVPD services) and other nascent ventures.	
26	Facing increasing rights fees and a decreasing subscriber base, ESPN lays off approximately 100 employees, including such notable on-air faces as athletes-turned-analysts Trent Dilfer and Danny Kanell, and noted journalists like NFL beat reporter Ed Werder and Major League Baseball expert Jayson Stark. Further cost-cutting measures taken by ESPN include relocating ESPNU's studio operations from Charlotte to the company's Bristol, Connecticut headquarters, reducing its longtime MLB studio show Baseball Tonight to Sundays as a lead-in to the primetime game, and adding the MLB Network-produced Intentional Talk to ESPN2's daily lineup.	
30	General Hospital, The Ellen DeGeneres Show, The Talk, Entertainment Tonight, Good Morning America, Jeopardy! and Steve Harvey are among the notable winners at the 44th Daytime Emmy Awards. The ceremony, hosted for the first time by Mario Lopez and Sheryl Underwood, was broadcast via livestream on Facebook Live and Periscope Producer.	

=== May ===
Date	Event	Source
1	After almost a full year of working with guest hosts in the wake of Michael Strahan's move to a full-time role at Good Morning America, Kelly Ripa introduces Ryan Seacrest as the new permanent co-host of the newly renamed Live with Kelly and Ryan, effective on this date. It is Seacrest's first turn as a host of a syndicated television program since his first effort in 2004. Under the arrangement, Seacrest will serve as an executive producer on the Disney/ABC-produced Live, and will relocate from Los Angeles to New York City (with his syndicated radio program, which will move into a converted radio studio inside ABC's New York City offices, following suit) to accommodate his work on the show.,	
1	Fox News announces the resignation of its co-president, Bill Shine, in the wake of ongoing sexual harassment cases and accusations at the network and his alleged knowledge about and cover-ups of them. Longtime deputies Suzanne Scott and Jay Wallace succeed Shine as president of programming and president of news, respectively.	
1	In an emotional monologue criticizing House Republicans' attempts to replace the Affordable Care Act with the controversial American Health Care Act, Jimmy Kimmel reveals that his newborn son, William John Kimmel (to whom wife and show co-head writer, Molly McNearney, had given birth on April 21), had recently undergone surgery to repair a rare congenital heart defect, tetralogy of Fallot with pulmonary atresia, that was detected by a nurse when William was three hours old. To tend to his son, Kimmel takes paternity leave from Jimmy Kimmel Live!, with Will Arnett, Anthony Anderson, Kristen Bell and David Spade, respectively, filling in for Kimmel for the remainder of the week.	
2	Hours after their old deal expires, the Writers Guild of America (both West and East branches) and the Alliance of Motion Picture and Television Producers announce a new three-year labor agreement (pending approval of the union's rank-and-file), averting a potential strike that could have adversely affected TV production. Under the proposal, which Guild membership approved by May 24, writers will receive higher pay for work on shorter-run seasons of television programs distributed on both linear and digital platforms, and residuals for programs distributed on video on demand platforms. Both sides also agreed to increase studio and network contributions and initiate other cost-effective changes to the WGA's health insurance plan.	
3	On the heels of YouTube TV, Hulu beta launches its own virtual MVPD service, which offers access to live streams of more than 50 broadcast and cable-originated channels as well as Hulu's library of 3,500+ TV series and films for $39.99 per month. The service, first announced in 2015, offers live streams of programming from the five major broadcast networks (ABC, CBS, NBC, Fox and The CW) through owned-and-operated stations and affiliates in New York City, Los Angeles, Chicago, San Francisco and Philadelphia (Hulu plans to reach deals with other broadcasting groups to expand its portfolio of streamed stations), as well as cable channels owned by NBCUniversal, 21st Century Fox, CBS Corporation, The Walt Disney Company, Turner Broadcasting System, Scripps Networks Interactive and A+E Networks (encompassing networks such as CNN, Food Network, Disney Channel, A&E, MSNBC and ESPN). Showtime – which Hulu had been selling as a standalone streaming offering since the launch of the premium channel's OTT service in 2015 – is also available as an add-on for an extra fee. The lineup does not include channels owned by major groups like Viacom, with which Hulu has indicated it will not seek a carriage agreement, Home Box Office Inc., Starz Inc., Discovery Communications or AMC Networks.	
4	Gray Television announces its purchase of WCAX-TV/Burlington-Plattsburgh, acquiring the station long held by the Hasbrook/Martin family and its Mount Mansfield Television company for $29 million. Gray will assume operational control under a local marketing agreement beginning June 1, with the purchase expected to be completed in the third quarter of 2017.	
4	Morning Joe co-hosts Joe Scarborough and Mika Brzezinski announce in an interview with Vanity Fair they are engaged. Scarborough and Brzezinski, who have been co-hosts of the MSNBC morning political talk show since 2007, reportedly began dating months after Brzezinski filed for divorce from her first husband, WABC-TV/New York City investigative reporter James Hoffer, in December 2015. They marry on November 24, 2018.	
7	The 2017 MTV Movie & TV Awards air live on MTV and its Viacom sister networks, originating from Los Angeles' Shrine Auditorium in a live broadcast. The event, for the first time, features honors in television categories, along with individual honors not being listed by gender, with TV honors going to Stranger Things for "Best Show" and the Netflix series' co-star, Millie Bobby Brown, winning "Best Actor in a Show".	
8	Sinclair Broadcast Group announces that it will acquire Tribune Media for $3.9 billion, plus the assumption of $2.7 billion in debt. Factoring prior purchases still under regulatory review, the acquisition may boost Sinclair's portfolio to as many as 223 stations in 108 markets, with expansions into additional top-10 markets including New York City, Los Angeles, Chicago, Philadelphia and Dallas (CW affiliate WPIX/New York City will displace ABC affiliate WJLA-TV/Washington, D.C. – which will form a duopoly with CW affiliate WDCW through the deal – as its largest station by market size).To comply with DOJ antitrust and FCC ownership regulations, Sinclair is required to divest stations in certain markets that will put the group over the current 39% national reach limit. Sinclair executives indicated that the group will fully divest any conflict stations to independent buyers if necessary, though given FCC chairman Ajit Pai's relaxed scrutiny on outsourcing agreements, it may also consider selling some to partner companies such as Cunningham Broadcasting and Deerfield Media.	
8	With the Tribune purchase announcement, Sinclair Broadcast Group CEO Christopher Ripley revealed that the company will reposition WGN America (one of five networks, along with Antenna TV, Chicagoland Television, and partial interests in Food Network and This TV, that it will acquire from Tribune, joining Sinclair's five existing broadcast and cable networks) for "profitable growth" once it assumes ownership of the cable network, de-emphasizing high-end scripted series in favor of acquired programs and "cost-effective" originals on the basis that WGN's ratings do not justify its current original programming budget (Peter Kern – whose predecessor, Peter Liguori, spearheaded the former superstation's original programming efforts in 2014 to build viewership and expand its national distribution – signaled WGN America's shift away from scripted content after he took over as Tribune's interim president and CEO in March, when the network cancelled Outsiders). The statement immediately put into question the future of Underground, a slavery-era period drama that premiered in March 2016 and ended its second season on May 10 The series was officially canceled on May 30.	
9	Over a year after the reality competition had its final airing on Fox, ABC announces it has ordered a revival of American Idol to debut during the 2017–18 season. The long-running reality competition series, based on the British series Pop Idol, had previously aired on Fox from 2002 to 2016, spending most of its run as that network's highest-rated program as well as the highest-rated series on U.S. broadcast television from the 2003–04 season until the 2010–11 season.	
10	Morgan Murphy Media acquires CBS affiliate KOAM-TV/Pittsburg, Kansas and ABC primary affiliate KAVU/Victoria, Texas (including its CBS, NBC, and Univision subchannel/low-power TV outlets) from Saga Communications – which is exiting the television business to focus on its radio stations – in a $66.6 million deal. The transaction includes an option to acquire Surtsey Media-owned Fox affiliate KFJX/Joplin, Missouri and SagamoreHill Broadcasting-owned Fox affiliate KVCT, both of which are operated by Saga under local marketing agreements. Saga will use proceeds from the sale of the television assets to acquire Apex Media, a group that is in the process of selling their radio stations in Charleston and Hilton Head Island, South Carolina.	
12	The Federal Communications Commission fines Vearl Pennington and Michael Williamson, operators of Morehead, Kentucky low-power television station W10BM, $144,344 for continuing to operate the station despite the 2004 cancellation of its license for failure to file for license renewal in 1998. In its Notice of Apparent Liability, the FCC noted that it had warned Pennington and Williamson that the continued unlicensed operation was against the law and ordered them to shut down the station, but that they had not done so.	
14	The Miss USA 2017 pageant was held at the Mandalay Bay Events Center in Las Vegas, Nevada and was broadcast by Fox and Azteca. The show was hosted by Julianne Hough and Terrence J, reprising their 2016 hosting roles. Model and body activist Ashley Graham also returned as backstage host. Brett Eldredge, Pitbull, and the cast of Michael Jackson: One by Cirque du Soleil performed. Deshauna Barber of the District of Columbia (who shared an emotional story about her mother's death shortly after winning the title the previous year and had an Afro hair wearing in honor of her mother's memory during her farewell walk) crowned her successor Kára McCullough, also of the District of Columbia at the end of the event. McCullough will represent the United States at the Miss Universe 2017 competition. This is the first consecutive win for a state at Miss USA since Texas won the crown in 1988 and 1989. Entertainment reporter Alex Wehrley, a former Miss Wisconsin USA, and Barber hosted the preliminary competition held on May 11.	
14	With the conclusion of the two-hour sixth season finale episode "The Final Battle", the ABC fantasy drama Once Upon a Time marks its final Sunday night 8PM (ET) timeslot airing after six seasons (the show's only airing day and most frequent timeslot since it debuted in October 2011), moving to the Friday night 8PM (ET) timeslot starting October 6, and also marks the final appearances for six of the series' regulars in that status. Jennifer Morrison (who plays Emma Swan) was the first to announce that she would be departing, followed by Rebecca Mader (Wicked Witch of the West / Zelena) after two seasons, original cast members Ginnifer Goodwin (Snow White / Mary Margaret Blanchard), Josh Dallas (Prince Charming / David Nolan) and Jared Gilmore (Henry Mills), and Emilie de Ravin (Belle / Belle Gold) who joined in the second season. All six actors would make at least one appearance in season 7, with Mader and Gilmore recurring most significantly, including all for the series finale. As part of a soft reboot that would lead to a new setting and storyline, the final moments of the episode shifted to the future, where an adult Henry Mills (played by new regular Andrew J. West) is asked by his daughter Lucy (new regular Alison Fernandez) to save their family after she escaped a nearly destroyed Enchanted Forest.	
21	The 2017 Billboard Music Awards air on ABC with Ludacris and Vanessa Hudgens as hosts. Drake was the night's big winner with 13 awards, surpassing Adele's record (with 12 wins in 2012) for most wins in a single year. The event also saw Miley Cyrus' comeback performance ("Malibu"), Celine Dion's tribute to the 20th anniversary of the film Titanic performing her signature song "My Heart Will Go On", and Cher being honored as the Icon Award winner (the former two of which, alongside South Korean group BTS winning the Top Social Artist award – the group's first live public appearance on an American music awards show, and the first K-pop artist to win that award – were among the show's most tweeted moments on social media).	
22	ABC's The Bachelorette begins its 13th season with Rachel Lindsay, an attorney, chosen to select a fiancée among 25 male suitors. Lindsay, who was second runner-up on The Bachelor's 21st season, on which she was still appearing when the announcement was made on Jimmy Kimmel Live! on February 12, and was one of the few black contestants to reach the third-to-last "Hometown Dates" round, becomes the first African-American to serve as a lead in the Bachelor/Bachelorette franchise, which has been criticized in recent years over the lack of diversity with its contestants overall, and whose producers (Next Entertainment, NZK Productions and Warner Horizon Television) faced a discrimination lawsuit in 2012 by two Tennessee men whose applications were rejected by the program's producers, which was later dismissed on grounds that casting decisions were protected by the First Amendment.	
23	NFL running back Rashad Jennings (a free agent at the time, after having been released by the New York Giants in February) is crowned the winner of the 24th season of ABC's Dancing with the Stars. Jennings and his pro partner, Emma Slater, beat former Major League Baseball catcher David Ross and his partner, Lindsay Arnold, to win the show's Mirror Ball trophy.	
25	Millerton, Pennsylvania native Ryan Belz wins $31,500 by playing Plinko on CBS game show The Price Is Right, setting a new record for the highest winning amount in one of the show's most popular pricing games. Belz, a Penn State University graduate and an aspiring TV meteorologist, said in an interview with TMZ that he credited his job at Target for helping him to win on the show by familiarizing him with prices for a wide variety of items.	
29	Almost five months after beginning local weather coverage, WPBI-LD/Lafayette, Indiana launches its news department with the debut of its weekday-only nightly newscast under the "Star City News" brand. The newscasts, which presently broadcasts 7 1/2 hours of local newscasts each week, air at 6:00 and 11:00 p.m. on NBC-affiliated subchannel, and at 10:00 p.m. on Fox-affiliated primary channel. Additionally, radio tie-ins of the newscasts are also planned for Waypoint Media-owned sister stations WSHY, WBPE, WYCM, and WAZY-FM.	
31	CBS affiliate KFMB-TV affiliates its DT2 subchannel with The CW, assuming the network's San Diego affiliation from XETV-TDT, licensed across the Mexican border in Tijuana, Baja California (MeTV had earlier vacated KFMB-DT2 on May 1, moving to KGTV-DT2 and its sister station KZSD-LP); KFMB-DT2 also launches weekday morning, and weeknight-only 7:00 and 10:00 p.m. newscasts produced by its parent station, and displaces XETV from that station's existing channel slots on local cable and satellite providers. XETV concurrently becomes a full-time primary affiliate of Canal 5 (which had been carried on its DT2 subchannel since 2012), a move that ends its 63-year run as an English-language television station: it had served as an affiliate of ABC (1956–1973) and Fox (1986–2008), and as an independent during its tenure. XETV owner Televisa dissolved the American managerial licensee that ran its San Diego-based operations, Bay City Television, and had earlier (on March 31) closed the station's news department. The switch makes San Diego the largest U.S. market with a subchannel-only CW affiliate (superseding WKRC-DT2/Cincinnati) and the largest overall in which any of the major networks maintains a subchannel-only affiliation.	
31	CBS News confirms that Scott Pelley would exit as anchor of the CBS Evening News, nearly six years after he assumed the role from Katie Couric on June 6, 2011. Pelley – who will depart from the program following the June 16 edition – will remain full-time in his correspondent role at CBS' 60 Minutes. Anthony Mason is designated as interim Evening News anchor.	
31	CNN removes Kathy Griffin from its New Year's Eve Live broadcast following the release of images from a controversial photoshoot by photographer Tyler Shields, in which Griffin is seen holding a decapitated, bloody head bearing a resemblance to President Donald Trump, an act that the network stated was "disgusting and offensive". Griffin had co-hosted the cable channel's New Year's Eve coverage from Times Square with Anderson Cooper since 2007. On October 11, it was announced that Bravo's Watch What Happens Live host Andy Cohen, who had participated in NBC's New Year's Eve coverage the previous year, hosting a special episode of Hollywood Game Night, and has collaborated with Cooper on a storytelling tour) would replace Griffin as his co-host for the year's celebration, and were reteamed the next year.	

=== June ===
Date	Event	Source
1	KCJO-LD/St. Joseph, Missouri – one of the three flagship stations owned by the locally based News-Press & Gazette Company – switches its network affiliation to CBS, becoming the network's first in-market affiliate in the area since 1967, when KQTV (then KFEQ-TV, which signed on as a CBS station in September 1953) switched to a full-time affiliation with ABC. The move, which also resulted in NPG moving KCJO's prior Telemundo affiliation to a newly activated digital subchannel of NBC affiliate KNPG-LD, displaced KCTV/Kansas City as the default CBS affiliate for the market. As NPG already controls the market's Fox, NBC and CW affiliations respectively through KBJO sisters KNPG and KNPN-LD, the switch left MyNetworkTV as the only conventional English language broadcast network available in the St. Joseph area through a Kansas City-based station (KCTV's MyNetworkTV-affiliated sister station, KSMO-TV, is receivable over-the-air and is also carried on Suddenlink, Dish Network and DirecTV in the St. Joseph market).	
1	Just moments after President Donald Trump announced that he will withdraw the United States from the 2015 Paris Climate Accord, the fallout saw one of the supporters of this initiative, The Walt Disney Company Chairman Bob Iger, resigning from his advisory councils. The Weather Channel and National Geographic also respond to Trump's decision by turning their webpages into protest sites highlighting the dangers of climate change and disputing Trump's claims about it not being real.	
2	In a live interview during HBO's Real Time, host Bill Maher and guest Senator Ben Sasse (R-Nebraska) discuss the boundaries between adolescence and maturity, at which point Sasse remarks about having Maher "work in the fields" of Nebraska. Maher replies by describing himself as a "house nigger." Maher utters the racial slur in jest (the conversation had turned by that point to adults in California who dress up for Halloween), but his remark is quickly condemned by HBO, who calls it "completely inexcusable and tasteless" and edited it out of repeats of the episode aired on its linear and streaming services. With several calls for his firing from HBO, Maher expressed regret at his choice of words in the interview.	
6	Production on the fourth season of ABC's reality dating series Bachelor in Paradise is suspended, after producers lodged allegations of sexual misconduct against DeMario Jackson (who originally appeared in season 13 of The Bachelorette), who, on the first day of filming, was alleged to have engaged in a sexual encounter with Corinne Olympios, who alleges that she was too inebriated to give consent (most news outlets initially withheld The Bachelor season 21 contestant's identity as the accuser in reports, prior to Olympios obtaining attorney Marty Singer as her legal counsel). All of the initial contestants were sent home from the Sayulita, Mexico resort set to the U.S. on June 11. The incident placed doubt on whether the Bachelor spinoff will continue for its planned summer 2017 season, if at all. On June 20, Warner Horizon Television, the show's production company, disclosed that an investigation launched upon the discovery that the incident was filmed by one of the show's camera crews had yielded no evidence of misconduct, and that filming would resume; Singer said that an independent investigation on the accusations would be conducted.	
14	In the wake of mass shootings in Virginia and San Francisco, NBC pulls an episode of The Carmichael Show, titled "Shoot-Up-Able", from its schedule due to a similar story line involving the mass shootings (which saw Jerrod Carmichael's eponymous fictional character surviving a mass shooting physically unharmed but psychologically scarred), and replaces it with another episode, "Lesbian Wedding." That same day, Carmichael appeared on the Netflix talk show Chelsea, which was filmed after the shootings but before NBC had made the final decision to pull the episode. Carmichael told host Chelsea Handler that he hoped NBC would not pull "Shoot-Up-Able", and that doing so would be a "disservice" to viewers. The episode ultimately was not centered around political discussions such as gun control, but Carmichael and his family afterward, and was rescheduled for a June 28 airing.	
15	The District of Columbia Court of Appeals denies an emergency stay motion that was filed by The Institute for Public Representation on behalf of a coalition of public interest groups (including among others, Free Press, the United Church of Christ, the Prometheus Radio Project, the National Hispanic Media Coalition and Common Cause) on May 15, to block the FCC's restoration of the UHF discount, which counts the total market reach of UHF stations toward the nationwide ownership cap. Had a permanent stay motion been granted, it would have placed a roadblock for Sinclair Broadcast Group's acquisition of Tribune Media. Prior to the initial administrative stay on June 1, the FCC and the National Association of Broadcasters asked the D.C. Court of Appeals to not issue the proposed motion on grounds that the plaintiffs did not provide sufficient basis for the stay. The groups that filed the motion argued that there was no longer any technical logic for the UHF discount to be restored (as UHF digital stations have typically maintained better signal quality compared to UHF transmissions in analog) and would trigger a wave of mergers and acquisitions in the broadcast television industry that would result in fewer diverse station owners. A lawsuit filed by the public interest groups to determine whether the UHF discount can remain in place remains subject to a pending court proceeding.	
15	Citing her busy schedule, which includes three shows (series regular on Criminal Minds, host of The CW's Whose Line Is It Anyway?, and as a voice talent on FXX's Archer) and a directorial debut for the film Axis, as her motive, Aisha Tyler announces that she would be leaving The Talk after six seasons following the completion of the show's seventh. Tyler, who joined the CBS daytime talk show during its second season alongside Sheryl Underwood, said she would return as a guest host and to promote her various projects.	
17	Cops begins its 30th season, continuing its reign as America's longest-running reality show	
18	The NBC newsmagazine Sunday Night with Megyn Kelly airs a segment profiling broadcaster/blogger Alex Jones (founder of the conservative news website InfoWars). The segment drew volumes of controversy prior to the broadcast over fears that host Megyn Kelly's interview with Jones would give a less-than-critical platform for Jones' alt-right views and the various conspiracy claims he promotes, most notably the charge that the 2012 Sandy Hook Elementary School shooting in Newtown, Connecticut was a hoax with actors portraying victims. Out of respect for the victim's families, NBC's Connecticut O&O, WVIT/New Britain, pre-empted the broadcast. episodes of George to the Rescue, a home improvement series produced by New York City sister station WNBC, aired in its place. The network's decision to air the interview led JPMorgan Chase & Co. to pull its ads from the program through that night's edition, while the Sandy Hook Promise Foundation dropped Kelly as host of an upcoming charity gala. Jones claimed that NBC would edit the interview to show him in a less-than-flattering light.	
19	The Comcast-owned network Syfy adopts a new logo and imaging, as well as stylized capitalization of the channel's name and slogan, "It's a Fan Thing", in honor of its 25th anniversary. The new branding (which unveiled on May 11, four days prior to NBCUniversal's upfront presentation) wo ild aim to re-position the channel back towards targeting fans of the fantasy and science fiction genres. NBCUniversal Cable Entertainment Group President of Entertainment Networks and network head Chris McCumber explained that the new logo was meant be a "badge" that could be used across its array of programming. Syfy also planned to place a larger focus on its genre news division Syfy Wire, disclosing the possibility of extending the website to television as well.	
20	In separate deals, Ion Media Networks announces the purchase of three Ion Television-affiliated television stations in Missouri, South Carolina, and Idaho, which – if the transactions receive approval by the FCC and Department of Justice – would expand Ion's portfolio to 63 owned-and-operated television stations in 58 markets (including in 24 of the 25 largest U.S. markets; the purchase prices were not initially disclosed). Ion will acquire WRBU/East St. Louis, Illinois-St. Louis and WZRB/Columbia from a trust overseen by former LIN Media CEO Gary Chapman to which Ion Media Networks was the beneficiary; the trust had cancelled a stalled 2015 purchase by Cedar Creek Broadcasting (an arm of Northwest Broadcasting, controlled by its CEO, Brian Brady) on May 9. Separately, Ion will also buy KTRV-TV/Boise.	
22	CBS Television Stations reaches a 10-year exclusive partnership with ReachMe.TV that will put CBS programming on the latter's upcoming in-airport mobile entertainment network. The deal (with its content appearing on thousands of screens in the top 50 airports in the U.S. and Canada, with a reach of more than 70 million viewers a month) will provide entertainment, news and sports programming, including local news, weather and sports reports provided by CBS TV Stations; programming from other divisions of CBS Corporation including digital news service CBSN; and film and TV highlight packages from CBS Television Distribution-produced syndicated entertainment news program Entertainment Tonight. In addition, CBS TV Stations will also exclusively manage advertising sales for the said venture.	
25	John Oliver announces in his show Last Week Tonight that he has been sued by coal mining company CEO Robert E. Murray of Murray Energy Corporation. Oliver had received a cease and desist letter asking him to stop making negative comments about the company (specifically the controversial 2007 Crandall Canyon Mine disaster) from Murray's attorney the week before, but continued to do so. Oliver was later told by his attorneys not to discuss the lawsuit publicly while the case is pending, advice he is following.	
25	For the first time ever, the family of comedian and host Steve Harvey competes in an episode of Celebrity Family Feud. The ABC game show is a spin-off of the syndicated Family Feud, which also hosted by Harvey.	
26	Three CNN journalists, Thomas Frank, Eric Lichtblau, and Lex Haris, resign after the publication of a Russia-related article involving President Donald Trump that was later retracted.	
26	LocusPoint Networks announces it will sell independent station WMGM-TV/Wildwood, New Jersey to Univision Communications – owner of Philadelphia-based Univision owned-and-operated station WUVP-DT and UniMás O&O WFPA-CD for $6 million. (LocustPoint had purchased WMGM in October 2013, with the intent to sell its spectrum in the FCC incentive auction, but was unable to find a wireless provider to which it could sell the spectrum.) Univision assumed operational control of the station on November 14, at which time WMGM-TV became an affiliate of the Justice Network (with a simulcast of WUVP on its DT3 subchannel) and initiated a channel-sharing agreement with TBN O&O WGTW-TV/Millville.	
29	President Donald Trump begins posting tweets that take swipes at the news media for perceived biases against him. The first status is directed at Morning Joe personality Mika Brzezinski, in which the President called her "low I.Q. Crazy Mika" and falsely asserted that she was "bleeding badly from a face-lift". Brzezinski and Joe Scarborough, her fiancé and Morning Joe co-host, then accused the White House of threatening to blackmail them with an exposé in a tabloid magazine unless the pair apologized publicly to the President. Three days later, Trump published an old video from WrestleMania in which the CNN logo is superimposed over the head of Vince McMahon whom Trump is punching with the tagline "Fraud News Network." Both tweets cause concern among journalism advocates, who fear the President is inciting violence against the press. The person who made the image that Trump used immediately apologized and deleted his accounts saying that he did not want to incite or inspire violence against the media.	
30	Just a week ahead of production that was about to start on Hawaii Five-0's eighth season, it was announced that series regulars Daniel Dae Kim (who plays Detective Lieutenant Chin Ho Kelly) and Grace Park (who plays Chin Ho's cousin, Officer Kono Kalakaua) will be departing due to a salary dispute with CBS. Kim and Park had been seeking pay equality with co-stars Alex O'Loughlin and Scott Caan, but did not reach satisfactory deals with CBS Television Studios. CBS's final offer to Kim and Park was 10–15% lower than what O'Loughlin and Caan make in salary. An update of their characters (Chin Ho taking a job with the San Francisco Police Department; Kono investigating a pornography ring in Reno in the seventh-season finale) will be given in the first episode of the new season.	
30	Olivia de Havilland sues the producers of the FX series Feud, and the channel itself, over what she says is an inaccurate portrayal of her in the series that focuses on the relationship of Bette Davis and Joan Crawford, causing damage to her reputation. The charges include common law right of publicity, invasion of privacy and unjust enrichment. She is asking the court for not only damages but also any profits gained from the use of her likeness and an injunction to keep FX from continuing to use her name and likeness. The lawsuit eventually reached the United States Supreme Court in January 2019, where it is denied review.	
30	After a 40-year career as reporter and anchor, including a 25-year tenure as anchorwoman for KUSA-TV/Denver, Adele Arakawa retires from the Tegna-owned NBC affiliate.	

=== July ===
Date	Event	Source
1	NBC launches a new Telemundo owned-and-operated station in the San Diego market (on KNSD's digital 39.20 subchannel) that will replace Entravision's XHAS-TDT (licensed in Tijuana). XHAS becomes an affiliate of the American Azteca network, owned by Mexican conglomerate Azteca S.A. de C.V. (the parent of Tijuana's Azteca Trece affiliate XHJK-TDT and Azteca 7 transmitter XHTIT-TDT), displacing the market's existing low-power Azteca affiliate KZSD-LP. With this switch as well as The CW's migration from XETV-TDT to KFMB-DT2, the move results in Tijuana-based MyNetworkTV affiliate XHDTV-TDT becoming the last remaining Mexican-licensed station to serve the San Diego market to be affiliated with one of the major English or Spanish language networks.	
1	KidsClick, a multiplatform syndicated children's programming block, launches. The three-hour lineup of long-form and short-form animated content airs weekday and weekend mornings, primarily on CW- and MyNetworkTV-affiliated and independent stations operated by Sinclair Broadcast Group in several markets, and nationally on This TV. It also encompasses a website and mobile apps featuring a library of animated children's series from the block's content providers. KidsClick is the first conventional children's program block to air on American English-language commercial television since the discontinuance of NBC Kids in September 2016, which relegated traditional animated content on broadcast television to non-commercial broadcasters (such as PBS and the Trinity Broadcasting Network), and the first not to be E/I compliant since Vortexx was discontinued by The CW in September 2014.	
1	Nexstar-owned Hagerstown, Maryland independent station WHAG-TV changes its call letters to WDVM-TV (for "West Virginia", "District of Columbia", "Virginia" and "Maryland"), returning to the Washington, D.C., market (the western portion of which the new WDVM-TV serves) a callsign that had previously been used from 1979 to 1986 by what is now WUSA. Since it disaffiliated from NBC the year before (which ended in-market competition with NBC's Washington O&O WRC-TV and Baltimore affiliate WBAL-TV), the station has expanded its coverage throughout the Washington market through carriage agreements with local cable, satellite and telco services, along with expanding its local news coverage from focusing solely on the region of western Maryland and south central Pennsylvania to covering the larger Washington region.	
1	Waypoint Media-owned WPBY-LD in Lafayette, Indiana signs on the air, giving the Lafayette market its first full-time ABC affiliate, its third commercial station overall (the market had exclusively been served by CBS affiliate WLFI-TV since it signed on in June 1953, but did not get another major network affiliate until Waypoint signed on Fox-primary/NBC-subchannel affiliate WPBI-LD in October 2016), and in-market affiliates of all four major commercial networks. WPBY-LD's launch also marks Waypoint's third station launch in the U.S. in less than a year (alongside the respective February and March launches of CBS/MyNetworkTV duo KSWL-LD and KWWE-LD in Lake Charles, Louisiana). Prior to the sign-on, WRTV/Indianapolis served as the default ABC affiliate for the Lafayette area. WPBY's launch leaves The CW and MyNetworkTV as the only two networks available in the Lafayette area through their stations in Indianapolis (their respective affiliates for that market, WISH-TV and WNDY-TV, are viewable over-the-air and carried on Comcast, Dish Network, and DirecTV in Lafayette).	
1	ESPN broadcasts the boxing match between Manny Pacquiao of the Philippines and Jeff Horn of Australia, billed as the "Battle of Brisbane", which took place at Suncorp Stadium in Brisbane, Queensland, Australia. The fight, which saw Horn defeating Pacquiao after 12 rounds via a controversial unanimous decision to win the WBO welterweight championship title, marked the return of Top Rank boxing to ESPN; the promotion had previously aired fights on ESPN from 1980 to 1996, as well as the first time that a Pacquiao bout aired on a non-premium, basic cable channel in the United States, and was his first non-PPV bout since his co-main event fight with Héctor Velázquez in an Érik Morales-Zahir Raheem headliner in September 2005.	
3	Maria Menounos announced that she has stepped down as co-host of E! News after three years to battle an ongoing brain tumor, as well as helping her mother's battle with stage 4 brain cancer.	
3	As part of an ongoing investigation into sexual harassment at 21st Century Fox, Jamie Horowitz is ousted from his position as chief of programming for the Fox Sports division. The decision comes after several women were interviewed regarding their interactions with him. Before joining Fox Sports, Horowitz worked for Today and ESPN.	
6	Liberty Interactive, parent company of QVC, announces that it will acquire the 62% stock interest in Home Shopping Network parent HSN, Inc. that it did not already own for $40.36 per share (a value of $2.1 billion). After the deal is finalized, which is expected to occur in the fourth quarter of 2017 pending regulatory approval, Liberty will spin off its cable television operations into an independent company to be named QVC Group, which will be headed by QVC CEO Mike George, but will repurchase common stock in the new company. The combination of the two pioneer home shopping channels – which will continue to operate independently – is designed to improve their respective e-commerce operations, reduce costs and provide marketing opportunities, as well as to compete with online shopping services such as Amazon.In addition to QVC, HSN and their respective sister channels (HSN2, QVC2 and BeautyiQ), the company's holdings will include shopping website Zulily and HSN's Cornerstone lifestyle brands unit.	
6	Fox Business announced that it has suspended anchor Charles Payne over sexual harassment allegations made against him after an investigative story appeared in the Los Angeles Times about a three-year "romantic relationship" Payne had with a married female political analyst who frequently appeared on Fox Business Network and Fox News from 2013 to 2016, which in turn led to an investigation into the matter after the woman contacted a lawyer upon discovering that she was banned from Fox after she ended the affair as she believed Payne would help her chances of landing a position at the network, but instead saw her appearances on both FBN and FNC reduced as retaliation when she went to then-Fox News executive Bill Shine before his firing in May. Payne admitted to the extramarital affair in a statement to the National Enquirer published on July 5 that included an apology to his wife, children and friends, this after having denied the claims prior to the suspension.	
7	Savannah Guthrie celebrates her fifth anniversary as an anchor of Today, which featured a look back at some of her most memorable moments on the show (including her breaking news coverage reports, funniest moments and celebrity interviews). Guthrie, who joined the NBC morning news/talk show as co-host of the third hour, and chief legal correspondent in June 2011 following Meredith Vieira's departure, became the show's anchor in July 2012 when Ann Curry stepped down to become a correspondent and anchor-at-large at NBC News until 2015.	
11	Just one year after he fled to Kentucky to avoid arrest on a child rape that allegedly occurred in Nashville back in 2004 (The alleged victim is a female family member), followed by a lengthy and delayed trial, which in turn led to TLC to cancel the reality series The Willis Family (along with social media accounts being deleted or terminated) in 2016, patriarch and musician Toby Willis pleads guilty to four counts of child rape. Cheatham County, Tennessee Circuit Court Clerk Julie Hibbs confirmed that Willis received two 25-year sentences on two counts and two 40-year sentences on the other two. Those sentences will be concurrent, and served at 100 percent, giving Willis a total of 40 years in prison.	
13	CBS News and BBC News announces an editorial and newsgathering partnership under which the networks will share content around the world via their respective television, radio, and social media platforms (this ends the partnership the BBC maintained since the mid-90s with ABC News). The content-sharing arrangement will begin immediately, with additional newsgathering elements being added in the coming months.	
14	AT&T Sports Networks rebrands four of its five Root Sports-branded regional sports networks under the AT&T SportsNet moniker; the channels affected primarily serve Houston, Pittsburgh, Utah, and the Rocky Mountain region. The lone exception is Root Sports Northwest, as Baseball Club of Seattle LP, the operating company of the Seattle Mariners, holds a controlling interest in the channel, and AT&T only owns 40% of that network. AT&T acquired the channels in its 2015 purchase of DirecTV.	
14	NBC flagship O&O WNBC/New York City anchor Chuck Scarborough steps down as the anchor of the station's 11:00 p.m. newscast. Scarborough, who has been the station's main anchor since he joined in 1974 having most prominently been teamed with former anchor Sue Simmons from 1980 to 2012 and will continue to anchor the 6:00 p.m. newscast afterwards, would be succeeded by 4:00 p.m. anchor Stefan Holt (son of NBC Nightly News anchor Lester Holt) on the station's late night newscast beginning July 17.	
15	Olympic Channel launches over the former channel space of Universal HD, which shut down the previous day. The channel, a linear Team USA focused version of the international Olympic Channel was launched by NBCUniversal in conjunction with the International Olympic Committee.	
17	MyNetworkTV O&O WDCA/Washington, D.C., rebrands as "Fox 5 Plus", eliminating the "My20" moniker after 11 years. The station's rebranding comes after Fox Television Stations' April 17 announcement that it will launch a new 8:00 p.m. primetime newscast produced by Fox owned-and-operated sister station WTTG, and will continue to air its current lineup of MyNetworkTV (on a one-hour delay from 9:00–11:00 p.m.) and syndicated programming to provide better name recognition with the latter sister station (the moniker change follows the April 2016 rebranding of San Francisco sister station KICU-TV, which rebranded as "KTVU Plus", in a similar tie to its Fox O&O duopoly partner KTVU).	
19	Weigel Broadcasting reaches an agreement to acquire Heroes & Icons affiliate KCSG/Cedar City, Utah – which serves the Salt Lake City market – from West American Finance Corporation for $1.1 million. The agreement was not disclosed until the release of an FCC license transfer consent filing on August 1). The acquisition will make KCSG the first television station that Weigel has owned outside of its traditional Midwestern territory of Illinois, Wisconsin and Indiana (the Chicago-based company already owns stations in the Chicago, Milwaukee, Rockford and South Bend, Indiana markets).I	
21	Spanish-language broadcaster Entravision Communications announces it was acquiring Palm Springs duopoly, KMIR-TV (NBC) and KPSE-LD (MyNetworkTV) from OTA Broadcasting for $21 million, pending FCC approval. The sale to Entravision, which is expected to close in the fourth quarter of 2017, will make both stations a sister stations to KEVC-CD (UniMás) and KVER-CA (Univision).	
22	Professional boxer Jake Paul and The Walt Disney Company announce his departure from the Disney Channel sitcom Bizaardvark as supporting character Dirk in the middle of its second season, days after Paul appears in an interview on KTLA/Los Angeles as unrepentant about disorderly conduct, pranks and disruptive parties at his West Hollywood home, which he shares the address to in order to draw crowds, to massive complaint from neighbors.	
23	Former Olympic athlete Michael Phelps competes with a Great White shark in a Discovery Channel special Phelps vs. Shark: Great Gold vs. Great White, as part of its annual, week-long programming block Shark Week. The special, which saw the shark defeating Phelps by two seconds in a race between a man and a shark, sparked controversy among its viewers after it was revealed that the shark was actually computer generated, which Discovery and Phelps defended it.	
24	Fusion relaunches its online presence under the brand "Splinter". The Univision Communications-owned website was merged into the parent company's recently acquired Gizmodo Media Group unit, with Fusion's website switching to Gizmodo's Kinja domain and commenting system in May prior to the rebranding.	
31	Discovery Communications announces it will acquire Scripps Networks Interactive in a cash-and-stock transaction valued at $11.9 billion (or $90 per share), plus the assumption of $2.7 billion in net debt held by Scripps. Expected to be finalized by the first quarter of 2018, the deal results in the combined company – which encompasses more than 20 domestic and international television networks, most of which are educational or lifestyle-oriented, including Discovery Channel, TLC, Animal Planet, OWN, HGTV, Travel Channel and Food Network – controlling a 20% audience share among ad-supported U.S. cable channels, and operating five of the 20 highest-rated cable networks among female viewers. Scripps and Discovery had previously held merger discussions as recently as 2014, each of which failed to produce a deal due to disagreements over sale price and other issues. Discovery's main competitor for Scripps Networks was Viacom, which rescinded its all-cash offer (Scripps sought a bid comprising a cash offering of at least 50%) on July 27, due to concerns that a jump in Scripps' stock price would increase Viacom's valuation to a level that, had such a bid by the media conglomerate been accepted, would risk downgrading its credit rating.	
31	In the latest in a series of cyber attacks against American entertainment companies, hackers steal data totaling 1.5 terabytes from HBO's server networks. While representatives did not specify whether the leaked content came from any of the Time Warner-owned premium service's original series in confirming the hacking, reports state that the stolen content consisted of then-unaired episodes of the sitcom Ballers and horror dramedy Room 104, as well as a script from the Game of Thrones episode "The Spoils of War" which was soon to air on HBO on August 6. In an email sent to employees, Richard Plepler, chairman/CEO of Home Box Office Inc., referred to the hack as "disruptive, unsettling, and disturbing for all of us", and stated that the incident was being investigated by senior leadership, technological staff and outside internet security.	
31	Sony Pictures Television Networks announces that it will acquire a 95% controlling interest in Flower Mound, Texas-based anime distributor Funimation for $143 million. The deal will allow Sony to provide synergies between Funimation, which includes streaming service FunimationNow, and its existing Animax and Kids Station network divisions, along with giving it rights to the company's program catalog (which includes more than 450 dubbed and subtitled anime titles such as Dragon Ball Z, Cowboy Bebop and One Piece). Funimation founder Gen Fukunaga will retain a 5% minority stake in the company, and remain as its CEO.	

=== August ===
Date	Event	Source
1	One day after sister company Scripps Networks Interactive was acquired by Discovery Communications, the E.W. Scripps Company announces that it will acquire Katz Broadcasting (operator of digital multicast networks Bounce TV, Grit, Escape and Laff) for $302 million, a deal that will give Scripps full control of the Katz properties (it had already owned a 5% interest in the group, at a valuation of $10 million). Company founder Jonathan Katz will remain with Katz Broadcasting – which will continue to be headquartered in the Atlanta suburb of Marietta, Georgia – to oversee operation of the networks as CEO of the new Scripps subsidiary after the purchase is finalized, pending regulatory approval.	
1	Fox News contributor and former homicide detective Rod Wheeler files a lawsuit in the U.S. District Court for the Southern District of New York, alleging that the 21st Century Fox-owned cable network, correspondent Malia Zimmerman and Dallas-based investor/Fox News commentator Ed Butowsky had worked in concert with the administration of President Donald Trump to concoct a since-discredited report on the murder of Seth Rich, a Democratic National Committee aide who was killed in a July 2016 shooting, which aired on Fox News on May 16. Wheeler alleges that he was misquoted in the story, claiming that the defendants intended to establish that Rich leaked DNC emails to WikiLeaks as part of a conspiracy to blame the Russian government to allay accusations that Trump had colluded with Russian lawyers and Kremlin associates to influence the outcome of the 2016 Presidential election, a move that Wheeler claims discredited his account when he made a correction to the disclosure. Butowsky and White House officials deny the accusations, with Butowsky accusing Wheeler's attorney, Douglas Wigdor (who has represented several Fox News employees in other lawsuits filed against the network), of fabricating the claims.	
2	NBC's Meet the Press and the American Film Institute announce a partnership to launch a film festival that would be held in November in Washington, D.C. The event, organized by Meet the Press host Chuck Todd, will offer submissions for what is expected to be a slate of seven short-length documentary films that are being accepted. The "Meet the Press Film Destival" will feature contemporary documentaries of up to 40 minutes in length that focus on untold stories of American politics. Films selected for the festival will be eligible for up to $5,000 in finishing support from NBC News for post-production costs, including licensing of third-party material, would likely get some sort of nod during the Sunday morning Meet the Press broadcast or during the week on MSNBC's MTP Daily.	
5	Fox News suspends Eric Bolling, a commentator and host of the Fox News Specialists and Cashin' In, pending the results of an investigation into sexual harassment allegations first disclosed by The Huffington Post on August 4, in which Bolling reportedly had sent lewd, unsolicited text messages – including one enclosed with a photo of his genitalia – to at least three female colleagues employed with parent subsidiary Fox News Networks (one with Fox News and two employed with Fox Business). In response, Fox Business pre-empted the August 5 edition of Cashin' In, replacing it with a live half-hour newscast. Bolling was dismissed by Fox News on September 8, with the channel concurrently cancelling the Fox News Specialists.	
7	Fox Television Stations-owned KUTP/Phoenix rebrands as "Fox 10 Xtra", aligning its brand with that of sister Fox O&O KSAZ-TV. Coinciding with the rebranding, KUTP – which will continue to carry programming from MyNetworkTV in prime time each weeknight – also begins simulcasting a two-hour-long late morning block of KSAZ's Fox 10 News Now streaming service each Monday through Friday. The moniker change marks the second MyNetworkTV O&O that Fox has rebranded to de-emphasize the programming service's brand, after its April 2016 rebranding of KICU-TV/San Francisco as "KTVU Plus" and its rebranding of WDCA/Washington, D.C., as "Fox 5 Plus" in July of this year.,	
7	Nexstar Media Group announces that it will acquire the non-license assets of CW affiliate WLWC/Providence, Rhode Island from OTA Broadcasting for $4.1 million. The transaction – which is not subject to FCC approval and is expected to close during the fourth quarter of 2017 – involves only the operational and programming assets of WLWC, which had its broadcast spectrum sold by OTA earlier in the year in the FCC incentive auction, and will likely enter into a channel sharing agreement with either CBS affiliate WPRI-TV or Fox primary/MyNetworkTV subchannel-only affiliate WNAC-TV (both of which Nexstar had assumed operational responsibilities in January, following the closure of its purchase of Media General).	
8	ESPN transforms its sister network ESPNU to "ESPN8: The Ocho" (a parody of the former name of ESPN2: The Deuce) on this date. The one-day only, rebranded faux sports network, which draws inspiration from the 2004 hit sports comedy film DodgeBall: A True Underdog Story and the former alternative sports/extreme sports format of ESPN2, features a lineup of unconventional sporting events including Disc Golf, Ultimate Trampoline Dodgeball, Firefighters World Challenge, Roller derby, and Arm wrestling, playing off the mantra highlighted in the film, "Bringing You the Finest in Seldom Seen Sports".	
8	The Walt Disney Company purchases an additional 42% stake (worth $1.58 billion) in digital technology provider BAMTech from MLB Advanced Media, giving it majority ownership (75%) in the venture. With the deal, Disney also announced that BAMTech will help the company launch over-the-top services for Disney's content library and ESPN, each carrying exclusive content. The streaming services would include ESPN+ (offering live games from Major League Baseball, NHL, Major League Soccer and college sports events, and Grand Slam tennis coverage) that would launch in early 2018, and Disney+ launching in late 2019 offering original family-oriented films and television programs as well as from Disney's content library. It will also serve as the streaming home for newer theatrical film releases beginning with Captain Marvel. This replaces an existing content deal with Netflix that, in turn, displaced a film rights agreement with pay-cable service Starz in 2016.	
10	CNN fires conservative commentator and American Spectator columnist Jeffrey Lord – a supporter of President Donald Trump, who joined the network as a political contributor in August 2015 – after he tweeted the Nazi victory salute "Sieg Heil" at Angelo Carusone, president of the progressive watchdog group Media Matters for America, who has been campaigning for Fox News to fire popular host Sean Hannity (Carusone forwarded a screenshot of Lord's tweet to CNN's Twitter account, asking for the Time Warner-owned network to comment "on air talent issuing (in [a] serious and non-ironic way) Nazi victory salutes"). In a telephone interview, Lord defended the use of the salute as satirizing Media Matters for its advertiser boycotts of controversial conservative pundits (equating such boycotts to fascism, and viewing them as infringing on the free speech rights of Hannity and other conservatives) and not as an endorsement of Nazism.	
10	The NBC medical drama The Night Shift airs a special veteran-themed episode titled "Keep the Faith." The episode – in which the main characters, employed as doctors at the fictional San Antonio Memorial Hospital, are tasked with treating military veterans injured by anti-gay protesters at a military funeral – was written, directed by and guest starred several military veterans, including episode writer/show co-producer Brian Anthony (an Army veteran), director Timothy Busfield (a Navy veteran), and guest stars Dan Lauria (who served as an officer in the United States Marine Corps and fought in the Vietnam War), Josh Kelly (who served as an Army Ranger in the Iraq War), and Yvonne Valadez (a former Air Defense Operator in the U.S. Army).	
11	For the third consecutive time in a year, Fox Television Stations rebrands yet another MyNetworkTV O&O, as WFTC/Minneapolis-St. Paul co-brands with sister Fox O&O KMSP-TV under the "Fox 9+" brand (joining similar rebrands involving O&Os of the programming service in Washington, D.C. and Phoenix). Coinciding with the move, WFTC also plans to premiere a half-hour 7:00 p.m. newscast on September 18, as well as begin carrying a one-hour-delayed rebroadcast of KMSP's 10:00 p.m. newscast.	
13	The 2017 Teen Choice Awards airs on Fox, which, for the first time since 2002 (and the fifth in its 18-year history), did not have an official host. The event saw Zendaya (accepting her "Choice Summer Movie Actress" award for her role in Spider-Man: Homecoming) give a speech about individuality and social justice, in response to the August 12 far-right/white nationalist rally protesting the planned removal of a Robert E. Lee statue from a Charlottesville, Virginia park (during which, among other clashes, an Ohio man killed one and injured 19 counter-protesters in a vehicle-ramming attack), as well as the state of American politics in general; similar speeches were made by Vanessa Hudgens (who was honored with the "See Her" Award for her work to improve media representation of females) and Lauren Jauregui (while accepting the award for "Choice Music Group", alongside her Fifth Harmony bandmates). Riverdale won the most awards among television nominees, winning all seven of its categories (including "Choice Drama TV Show" and "Choice Breakout TV Show", with stars Cole Sprouse, Lili Reinhart, Camila Mendes and Madelaine Petsch respectively winning "Choice Drama TV Actor", "Choice Breakout TV Star", "Choice Scene-Stealer" and "Choice Hissy Fit").	
17	Turner Broadcasting System announces it has acquired the rights to the UEFA Champions League soccer tournament, beginning with the 2018–19 competition, with the intention of streaming a majority of the games via a standalone online sports venue. The Time Warner-owned company reportedly paid $60 million for the right, notably higher than Fox Sports' current contract. While the new service is not expected to carry present sports offerings such as the NBA on TNT or Major League Baseball on TBS, Turner does plan on revealing other programming to be streamed in the future.	
21	A large number of media outlets broadcast live coverage of the solar eclipse that transited over the contiguous U.S. (which began at 10:17 AM PDT over Lincoln City, Oregon and ended at 2:44 PM EDT over Charleston, South Carolina), with NASA TV and NASA Edge offering live coverage and streaming during the event as well as ABC, CBS, Fox and NBC pre-empting regular programming to air live specials to cover the eclipse with correspondents stationed across the path of totality, along with CNN, Fox News, MSNBC, Science, and The Weather Channel. The PBS program Nova presented streaming coverage on Facebook hosted by Miles O'Brien, and aired a special episode chronicling the event—"Eclipse Over America"—that evening (which marked the fastest production turnaround time in Nova history).	
21	Cops celebrates its 1,000th episode with a live special on Spike called "Cops: Beyond the Bust", hosted by Terry Crews, which included historical clips from the run of the series as well as reunions of officers and the suspects that they arrested.	
21	Nexstar Media Group-owned MyNetworkTV affiliate KRON-TV/San Francisco expands its local news programming in prime time with the debut of an hour-long newscast at 9:00 p.m. The program (which expanded the station's weekday local news broadcast to 11 hours) resulted in moving MyNetworkTV's programming to late night (the station had already moved the network's second hour of programming to that time slot when it launched a 10:00 p.m. newscast a year prior) and competes with another newscast aired at that hour on independent station KOFY-TV (the latter is produced by ABC O&O KGO-TV under a news share agreement). The shift also resulted in KRON discontinuing its 11:00 p.m. newscast (a holdover from the station's pre-2001 NBC affiliation), which had been reduced to a 15-minute broadcast in coincidence with the 10:00 broadcast's debut.	
22	Reports surfaced that ESPN had reassigned sportscaster Robert Lee from calling an upcoming college football contest between the University of Virginia and the College of William & Mary, the decision coming on the heels of the protests in Charlottesville, Virginia, where UVA's campus is, as well as the similarity between the announcer's name and Confederate General Robert E. Lee. ESPN gave sportscaster Lee the option to remain on the telecast, but he chose another game.	
22	In what she saw was a rude and offensive remark to her ongoing divorce from Stephen Belafonte, Mel B threw a glass of water towards co-judge Simon Cowell and walked off the judges' table during a live broadcast of NBC's America's Got Talent after magician Demian Aditya attempted an escape trick involving a wooden box, fire and steel stakes – which did not come off perfectly during the routine – thus causing Cowell to elicit a comment about the aforementioned performance, saying "I kind of imagine this would be like Mel B's wedding night... A lot of anticipation, not much promise or delivery." (Aditya was later eliminated from the quarterfinals that night); Brown did return afterwards. This tension between Brown and Cowell has been going on since the latter joined as a regular in 2016, leading to several confrontations on the show.	
24	Bill Nye and the producers of his 1993–98 children's educational series Bill Nye the Science Guy sue The Walt Disney Company's Buena Vista Television division for $28.1 million ($9.4 million for Nye personally), accusing them of improperly concealing money and breaching its fiduciary duty and contract. The suit claims that starting in 1993, Nye and his partners were entitled to 50% of net profits from the series, which were never received. The suit also names Seattle PBS member station KCTS-TV, Rabbit Ears Productions, and producers James McKenna and Erren Gottlieb as plaintiffs. A Buena Vista Television spokesperson said in a statement: "This lawsuit is a publicity ploy and we look forward to vigorously defending it."	
26	Five-division boxing champion Floyd Mayweather has a celebrity boxing match against UFC Featherweight and Lightweight Champion Conor McGregor. The fight between the American boxer and the Irish mixed martial artist is billed as "The Money Fight" and "The Biggest Fight in Combat Sports History". The fight drew 4.3 million domestic buys, making it the 2nd highest buy rate in pay-per-view history only behind Floyd's fight against Manny Pacquiao.	
26–27	The studios of Tegna-owned CBS affiliate KHOU/Houston are flooded due to heavy rainfall from Hurricane Harvey as the station was covering the story on-air, prompting the station's staff to evacuate to a makeshift studio at PBS member station KUHT. At the same time, KHOU field reporter Brandi Smith and photographer Mario Sandoval came to the aid of a stranded truck driver that was caught in the floodwaters, and alerted Harris County Sheriff's Department officers, who rescued the man immediately. Smith's actions immediately captured the attention and praise of media outlets in Houston and from around the globe. On November 16, the station announced it will remain at KUHT indefinitely while finding new facilities, and not return to their former facility.	
27	CBS Corporation announces its intent to purchase Network Ten in Australia, pending approval of that country's Foreign Investment Review Board. This comes two-and-a-half months after it went into voluntary administration, that nation's equivalent to American corporate bankruptcy. CBS had already maintained a long-term program and news-sharing agreement with Ten, and was cited as a large creditor for Ten in the administration filing.	
27	The 2017 MTV Video Music Awards – which was held at The Forum in Inglewood, California – aired on MTV and its sister networks, hosted by Katy Perry. Building on its prior elimination of gender-specific categories from the MTV Movie & TV Awards (which were held on May 7), the 34th edition of the VMAs marked the first time that male and female nominees competed jointly in the "Best Video" categories (the separate Best Female and Best Male Video awards were replaced with the singular "Artist of the Year" category). Rapper/songwriter Kendrick Lamar (who kicked off the show with a well-received fiery set) led the nominations.. Other notable performances came from Taylor Swift (a video debut for "Look What You Made Me Do"), Lorde (who danced during her performance of "Homemade Dynamite" with a IV on her arm; she had to refrain from singing for medical reasons), Logic with Khalid and Alessia Cara (who invited people whose lives were saved or intervened during his performance of "1-800-273-8255"), Fifth Harmony (whose opening medley of "Angel"/"Down" featured a fifth person falling from the top of the stage, alluding to the group's feelings toward former member Camila Cabello), DNCE with Rod Stewart (a new take on Stewart's 1979 Disco hit "Da Ya Think I'm Sexy?"), Demi Lovato (from Las Vegas, performing "Sorry Not Sorry" at a poolside party), Thirty Seconds to Mars and Travis Scott (a thermal performance of "Walk on Water" and "Butterfly Effect"), Miley Cyrus ("Younger Now" with children and seniors), and a medley of hits from Video Vangard recipient P!nk, with Reverend Robert Wright Lee IV (whose great-great-great-grandfather is Robert E. Lee) introducing Susan Bro (the mother of Heather Heyer, who was killed in the August 12 Charlottesville rally), who presented the award to all of the nominees in the "Best Fight Against the System" category.	
28	Hulu announces an agreement with The CW, that will allow the streaming service to carry on-demand content from the network across Hulu's streaming platform and live programming feeds from The CW's local affiliates on the Hulu Live OTT pay television service. The CBS Corporation-Warner Bros. joint venture was the last of the major broadcast television networks in the U.S. to sign a deal with Hulu to make their content available on the service, joining ABC, CBS, Fox, and NBC, each of which had already signed deals and/or distribution arrangements earlier in the year.	
28	Fox-owned MyNetworkTV O&O KDFI/Dallas-Fort Worth rebrands as "Fox 4 More", which aligns its branding with fellow sister Fox O&O KDFW. KDFI also moved MyNetworkTV programming to the 8:00 p.m. to 10:00 p.m timeslot, using the 7:00 p.m. timeslot to rebroadcast KDFW's 5 to 6:30 p.m. newscasts. This is the fourth time that Fox Television Stations has rebranded a MyNetworkTV O&O to de-emphasize the brand.	
29	British TV provider Sky UK ends carriage of sister American network Fox News in the United Kingdom after fifteen years (a simulcast that fully resembled the main American network, outside of commercials being replaced by Sky News forecasts and headlines). A low audience average of 2,000 daily viewers is cited for the discontinuation, though FNC's issues through 2017 and Rupert Murdoch clearing hurdles to acquire the remainder of Sky UK are also cited.r	
30	After 27 years of scoring for The Simpsons, for which he won two Emmys for his work, it was revealed that composer Alf Clausen had been "fired" from the show, with suggestions that the reasons behind the decision were largely financial. His last complete score was for the season finale of Season 28.	
31	Fox Sports terminates Pete Rose from his role as a Major League Baseball analyst following allegations of sexual misconduct with a minor that were disclosed in a July 31 motion in a defamation lawsuit against attorney John M. Dowd (andwho served as special counsel in the insider betting investigation that led to then-Cincinnati Reds manager Rose's lifetime ban from baseball in 1989. The unidentified woman who filed the claim stated that she and Rose had engaged in a sexual relationship for several years in the 1970s, beginning when he was 34 and before she turned 16 (the age of consent in Ohio, where they then both lived); Rose acknowledged the claim, but said he thought the girl was 16 at the time. Rose filed the suit after Dowd claimed in a 2016 radio interview that a sports memorabilia dealer who handled Rose's bets on baseball games brought underage girls to spring training games for Rose's "satisfaction".	
31	Disney–ABC Television Group holds its day-long telethon event "Day of Giving" in support to the victims of Hurricane Harvey in Texas, which broadcast on ABC (including its O&O stations and affiliates), as well as expanding to Disney-owned platforms and networks (ESPN, Freeform, Disney Channel, A&E Networks – including History and Lifetime, ABC Radio, and Radio Disney) and on social media platforms. The network-wide telethon event (which began with an hour-long special episode of 20/20, titled "City Underwater: Catastrophe in Houston" on August 30, and concluded on Good Morning America on September 1) raised over $14 million in donation to the American Red Cross to help the hurricane victims.	
31	American Spirit Media-owned Fox affiliate KVHP/Lake Charles, Louisiana begins broadcasting ABC on its DT2 subchannel as "SWLA ABC", returning the network to Lake Charles for the first time since Raycom Media-owned NBC affiliate KPLC dropped its secondary ABC affiliation in 1980 (KVHP is operated by Raycom under a shared services agreement); with the CW affiliation being moved to KPLC-DT2 subchannel. The station also simulcasts KPLC's morning, 5:00 p.m., and 10:00 p.m. newscasts, and plans to launch an exclusive 6:30 p.m. newscast in mid-October.	

=== September ===
Date	Event	Source
5	Jimmy Fallon announces a $1 million donation to NFL defensive end J. J. Watt's fundraiser during the opening of an episode of NBC's late-night talk show The Tonight Show Starring Jimmy Fallon, and welcomes the Houston Gospel Choir (headed by Victoria White and Marquist Taylor, stars of a viral video who visited a storm shelter in Houston and formed a spontaneous gospel choir), performing "Lean on Me" in support of Hurricane Harvey victims.	
6	WFAN/New York City morning host Craig Carton of the Boomer and Carton program that simulcasts on CBS Sports Network alongside co-host Boomer Esiason, is arrested by federal agents at his home on charges of securities fraud, wire fraud, and conspiracy to commit those offenses. Carton and business partner Joseph Meli are alleged to have run a Ponzi scheme that defrauded $5.6 million from investors by falsely claiming they had access to millions of dollars of concert tickets at face value through non-existent agreements with concert promoters. Carton resigned from his duties at WFAN on September 13, thus also ending his co-hosting partnership on Boomer and Carton, which was rebranded the next day as The Morning Show with Boomer.	
9	In advance of the Florida landfall of Hurricane Irma, the Home Shopping Network temporarily closes the channel's St. Petersburg facility and transfers around 100 staffers to a temporary facility in Nashville, Tennessee, where HSN broadcasts would originate through at least September 11, when Irma was expected to leave Florida and weaken to a tropical storm.	
11	Weigel Broadcasting reaches separate agreements to acquire two television stations in California and Missouri, marking the company's second and third station purchases in markets outside of the Great Lakes region. The Chicago-based group purchases Azteca América affiliate KAZA-TV/Avalon, California – which serves the Los Angeles market – from Southern California License, LLC for $9 million, and purchases religious-secular independent station KNLC/St. Louis from New Life Christian Church for $3.75 million.	
11	Beth Mowins became the first woman to serve as a play-by-play announcer on a nationally televised NFL game when she called the Chargers-Broncos MNF contest in Denver, the second woman ever to do an NFL play-by-play broadcast (Gayle Sierens, longtime anchor at WFLA-TV/Tampa from 1977 to 2015, accomplished the feat first on a regional NBC telecast in 1987).	
11	On the same night as Hank Williams Jr.'s return to MNF, SportsCenter anchor Jemele Hill describes President Donald Trump as a white supremacist in a series of posts on Twitter, angering conservatives who call for her ouster from ESPN, among them Trump press secretary Sarah Huckabee Sanders during a daily White House media briefing. ESPN called the comments "inappropriate" and said in a statement that it addressed the situation with Hill.	
15	During the 3:00 p.m. ET edition of that day's CNN Newsroom, Fox Sports Radio host and OutkickTheCoverage.com founder Clay Travis remarked that "the First Amendment and boobs" were the two things that "never let [him] down" during a discussion on the controversy surrounding ESPN anchor Jemele Hill's criticism of President Donald Trump as a "white supremacist".	
17	The Primetime Emmy Awards aired on CBS with Stephen Colbert as host. The 69th annual event, which followed the other awards in using political rhetoric in both speeches and in an opening number by Colbert, as well as an appearance by former White House Press Secretary Sean Spicer, saw Hulu's The Handmaid's Tale win five awards, including Elisabeth Moss for Outstanding Lead Actress in a Drama Series and Outstanding Drama Series, marking the first time that a streaming program has won in both categories, along with Netflix winning the first streaming program in the Outstanding Television Movie category for Black Mirror.	
18	Political commentator Scottie Nell Hughes files a lawsuit against Fox News, claiming she was raped by Fox Business host Charles Payne, and eventually fired after reporting it in retaliation. The fallout comes after Payne, who was suspended in July because of his admitted affair with Hughes, was reinstated by Fox Business Network this month upon conclusion of an internal investigation.	
18	Just two weeks into the ABC daytime talk show's 21st season, Jedediah Bila announces that she would vleave her role as a co-host/panelist on The View effective after that day's broadcast. Bila – who, as a libertarian, served as a conservative voice on the program – did not disclose the reasoning for her exit.	
19	On his ABC program, Jimmy Kimmel launches into an attack on Sen. Bill Cassidy, stating that the co-sponsor of a bill intended to replace the Affordable Care Act lied to the host when appearing as a guest in May. Kimmel also urged viewers to contact their representative to oppose its passage. When later pressed by conservatives who claimed he is unqualified to discuss political matters, Kimmel responded that they voted for someone who "fired Meat Loaf on television", a reference to President Donald Trump's previous role as host of The Apprentice.	
20	Mediaite releases video which shows Lawrence O'Donnell cursing and berating staff during a commercial break for his MSNBC program, The Last Word. At issue was communication with personnel in the control room, as well as the sound of hammering nearby. O'Donnell later took to Twitter to express regret at the outburst.	
21	Due to a technical glitch in a test of the Emergency Alert System conducted by KWVE-FM, regional participants (specifically Cox Cable and Charter) accidentally simulcast a portion of Chuck Swindoll's Insight for Living program. Some viewers assumed that the system was hacked, as the segment of the program relayed (in which Swindoll was heard quoting 2 Timothy 3:1 and stating that "extremely violent times will come") could be insinuated out of context as discussing an impending apocalypse.	
24	In response to President Donald Trump's criticism of NFL players who decided to exercise their rights not to stand for the National Anthem, 28 of the 32 teams that have scheduled games on this day show their unity by locking together in arms, kneeling, and/or remaining in their locker rooms while the Anthem plays, a scenario that was shown during their broadcasts on CBS, Fox, and NBC. It was also the subject of topic on Sunday morning talk shows, as well as on ESPN, Fox Sports, and NFL Network.	
24	Star Trek returns to television through CBS All Access with the premiere of a new Star Trek series, subtitled Discovery airing in primetime on CBS for the occasion, ending the absence of a first-run Star Trek series on television since Enterprise was cancelled by UPN in 2005.	
24	E! celebrates the tenth anniversary of its longest-running family-oriented reality series Keeping Up with the Kardashians with a 90-minute special hosted by executive producer Ryan Seacrest, which had the Kardashian/Jenner family (Kris, Kim, Khloe, Kourtney, Kylie, and Kendall) get together for a sit-down interview and discussion about how the show and their lives have changed since its 2007 debut.	
28	NBC returns the "Must See TV" branding for the first time in three years with the premiere of returning comedies Superstore, The Good Place, Will & Grace, and Great News and drama Chicago Fire. This Is Us and Law & Order True Crime were originally part of its Thursday night lineup until the network's decision on May 30 that it will move those programs to Tuesday night – the former of which returned to its original Tuesday night 9:00 p.m. (ET) timeslot – in order to accommodate the former lineup's two-hour comedy block.	

=== October ===
Date	Event	Source
1	Altice USA reaches a last-minute retransmission agreement with The Walt Disney Company to carry its channels, narrowly averting what would have been a blackout of ABC owned-and-operated stations WABC-TV/New York City and WPVI-TV/Philadelphia, and several cable networks, including the ESPN family, Freeform, and Disney Channel within the cable provider's New York and New Jersey service area.	
2	CBS fires Hayley Geftman-Gold, who served as corporate parent CBS Corporation's vice president and senior counsel of strategic transactions, after a personal Facebook post in response to the previous night's massacre at the Route 91 Harvest festival in Las Vegas, which killed 58 people and injured 851, writing she felt no sympathy for the victims and casting country music fans as "often...Republican gun toters".	
7	Less than a week after performing on stage at the Route 91 Harvest festival when the shooting broke out, Jason Aldean opens Saturday Night Live with words of support for those suffering in the shooting's aftermath, followed by a cover of "I Won't Back Down" by Tom Petty, who had died one day after the shooting of cardiac arrest. With Gal Gadot serving as guest host and Sam Smith as musical guest, this broadcast also marked the first time that SNL aired in Israel, with Gadot giving her monologue in Hebrew, which viewers saw translated on screen to poke fun at the writers in English, as well as kissing cast member Kate McKinnon in a sketch parody of her blockbuster film Wonder Woman. The broadcast also featured a commercial parody on the popular testimonial ads for Safelite, in which a glass repair technician (played by Beck Bennett) becomes obsessed with both the 17-year-old daughter (played by Melissa Villaseñor) and her mother (played by Aidy Bryant) he answers to every time to repair their minivan when it has a broken windshield, only to discover that he is smashing the windshield each time, infuriating the mother. The company, through their Twitter account, responded to the show's spoof: "Thanks for the skit... Although we can take a joke, this one was a step too far. Our techs are our heroes. #notcool." The November 25 rerun of the episode had the parody deleted and replaced with another piece cut for time, and it has also been removed and replaced on Hulu, YouTube and NBC's on demand services, likely due to the objections from Safelite and its not playing well in the environment of current events.	
9	Just one day after Harvey Weinstein is ousted and fired as CEO and co-founder of The Weinstein Company in the wake of an article in The New York Times detailing reports of sexual harassment and misconduct towards women which has resulted in Weinstein denying the allegations, the studio's television division announced that his name will no longer be featured or credited on any of their shows produced by the company, effective immediately. The company will also take on a new name as soon as possible.	
9	ESPN suspends SportsCenter anchor Jemele Hill for violating their social media policy after she calls for fans to boycott the Dallas Cowboys' advertisers in response to owner Jerry Jones' statement that he will bench any players who disrespect the flag by kneeling during the National Anthem. It is the second time in a month Hill has caused controversy on Twitter, after she called President Trump a white supremacist in September.	
10	Rapper Eminem slams Donald Trump in a freestyle rap that debuted during the 2017 BET Hip Hop Awards, taped October 6, calling out the President for focusing on National Football League players' protests during "The Star Spangled Banner" instead of Puerto Rico's recovery efforts in the wake of Hurricane Maria, and delivering an ultimatum to Trump supporters who are also fans of the rapper to choose between one of them.	
12	Amazon Studios announces that Roy Price, the company's VP and global head of Prime Video content, has been suspended (and later fired from the company) following a harassment claim from one of the company's producers. The news comes after Isa Hackett, a showrunner-producer on the streaming service's The Man in the High Castle and Philip K. Dick's Electric Dreams, detailed in an exclusive interview with The Hollywood Reporter her "shocking and surreal" experience with the programming chief in July 2015. Hackett later reported the incident immediately to Amazon executives, and brought in outside investigators to speak to Hackett as well as Amazon execs; Hackett noted that she was never told the outcome of that inquiry and that she never seen Price at any events involving her shows. Price has denied the accusations. The fallout also comes on the heels of Amazon Prime's deals with projects they are co-producing with The Weinstein Company in the light of Harvey Weinstein's problems that led to his ouster from his company, which has yet to go forward.	
15	NBC Sunday Night Football announcer Al Michaels draws quick criticism on social media after joking that the New York Giants had a "worse week than Harvey Weinstein" during the team's win over the Denver Broncos, with commenters finding humor in neither the sexual misconduct allegations facing Weinstein nor its connection to New York's 0–5 start. The 72-year-old broadcaster offered his apology later in the game.	
15	The ABC reality series Shark Tank features former Major League Baseball player Alex Rodriguez as a guest investor, joining the panel of "shark" investors, becoming the first Hispanic shark to be featured on the show.	
15	A retransmission consent dispute between Viacom's Media Networks division and Spectrum was to come to a head with the expiration of VMN's carriage agreement with the former Charter, Time Warner Cable and Bright House Networks systems on this date, with Viacom posting news ticker messages about the dispute to Spectrum viewers of their networks during programming, along with the standard website describing their view of the dispute. Spectrum had already earned VMN's ire earlier in the year by moving networks which were decades-long basic cable stalwarts like Nickelodeon and MTV to their more expensive "Gold" tier allegedly due to the company's propensity for heavy repeats and older content on their networks. The dispute later comes to nothing, as Viacom and Spectrum come to a short-term extension late on this night, then solidify a preliminary deal on the evening of the 17th with no actual network removals occurring. A permanent deal is announced on November 15, returning Nickelodeon, BET, MTV, Comedy Central, Spike, VH1, TV Land and CMT to Spectrum's basic tier in the coming months, along with exclusive jointly produced programming for Spectrum customers.	
23	After just one airing, ESPN removes late-night program Barstool Van Talk from its lineup, citing concerns about distinguishing the content of show producer Barstool Sports, a website known for its off-color humor, from that of ESPN. The cancellation comes in the wake of complaints from staff at the network, most notably Samantha Ponder, who had been a target of Barstool in the past.	
24	In a 3–2 vote split along party lines, the FCC approves the elimination of the Main Studio Rule, a rule that was adopted as part of the Communications Act of 1934 – which established the FCC – requiring radio and television stations to maintain a studio facility in their city of license. (The rule was modified in the 1970s to allow the studio to be located within 25 miles of the city of license.) Under the repeal, which cited that it will allow traditional broadcasters to fall in sync with present-day technology and social media, stations will still be required to maintain local or toll-free phone numbers and public file materials that are not online-accessible for the communities they serve. Critics expressed concern that the rule's elimination will pave the way for at least some broadcasters to consolidate their local content to a handful of studio locations across the country (with little to no content originating in the community or markets a radio or television station serves). Those in favor (or at least indifferent) to the rule noted that broadcasters had already been using legal fictions to circumvent the rule; stations often leased the studios of other broadcasters and even vacant storefronts to pass off as their main studios.	
25	In the latest of a series of station buys for the Chicago-based group, Weigel Broadcasting announces it will purchase independent station KFFV/Seattle, MeTV affiliate KVOS-TV/Bellingham, Washington, and San Francisco stations KTLN-TV (TLN) and KAXT-CD from OTA Broadcasting for $23.2 million.	
26	NBC News suspends political analyst Mark Halperin from appearing on NBC's news programs or on MSNBC, amid a CNN report released the day prior, which detailed accusations from five women that he had sexually harassed female staffers several times between the late 1990s and mid-2000s, while Halperin was working as political director for ABC News. The allegations also led HBO to cancel a miniseries project based on Halperin's journalistic work on the 2016 presidential election. Halperin was officially fired from NBC News on October 30.	
27	Andi Mack introduces a storyline in which 13-year-old Cyrus Goodman (Joshua Rush) admits he has a crush on another boy, the title character's (Peyton Elizabeth Lee) steady boyfriend Jonah Beck (Asher Angel). This is the first time a Disney Channel live-action program features a regular character dealing with their homosexuality.	
28	Twitter permanently bans conservative author-columnist-consultant and former Donald Trump advisor Roger Stone for violating company rules after he went on a tirade after CNN reported the previous day that Special Counsel Robert Mueller approved the first charges into his investigation on the Russian meddling of the 2016 presidential election. Upon seeing the story during that day's broadcasts of The Lead and CNN Tonight, Stone took to Twitter and began to mock and harshly insult the hosts, Jake Tapper and Don Lemon (who days earlier had received death threats that has since lead to law enforcement authorities to launch an investigation), and contributors Ana Navarro, Bill Kristol, Carl Bernstein, and Charles Blow.	
31	Just as she was about to announce the finalists for her syndicated show's Halloween costume contest, host Wendy Williams faints on-air in a telecast going out live in much of the Eastern and Central time zones. After the immediate commercial break Williams returned and said, "That was not a stunt. I overheated and did pass out, but I'm a champ and I'm back", which was confirmed by her spokesman. Williams cited heat exhaustion from the Statue of Liberty costume she wore for the telecast.	

=== November ===
Date	Event	Source
1	The Houston Astros win Game 7 of the World Series against the Los Angeles Dodgers. It was the first championship ever in franchise's 55-year history. However, in 2019, the Astros were later investigated for illegally using a video camera system to steal signs which caused the scandals across the world. Managers A.J. Hinch, Alex Cora and player Carlos Beltrán were the people involved in the scandals as they were suspended from their respective teams.	
3	Netflix announces it will discontinue its relationship with Kevin Spacey amid a slew of sexual assault allegations against the Oscar and Emmy winner, with the online streaming service adamant it would not continue to carry House of Cards as long as Spacey, who starred as Frank Underwood on the program, was involved. Furthermore, Netflix cancelled a Gore Vidal biopic Spacey had filmed. Netflix content chief Ted Sarandos later said the sixth and final season of House of Cards would film without him.	
5	NBC cancels this week's tapings of The Tonight Show Starring Jimmy Fallon after the host's mother, Gloria Fallon, died on November 4; he had previously cancelled the November 3 episode taping, citing a "family emergency".	
7	Just two years after his colleague cameraman and reporter-fiancée were killed in a murder-suicide, Chris Hurst, a former anchor for CBS affiliate WDBJ/Roanoke, wins a seat to represent the 12th District of Virginia's House of Delegates. Hurst, a Democrat who had actively supported gun control legislation among other issues (including advocating for families struggling for access to mental health care and equality in education for students with special needs) in this district when he entered the race in February after leaving his job at WDBJ, unseated Joseph Yost, a three-term Republican incumbent.	
8	Garth Brooks, who, despite lip-syncing issues for his performance, emerges as the Entertainer of the Year winner), Chris Stapleton (Male Vocalist of the Year and Album of the Year for From A Room: Volume 1), Miranda Lambert (Female Vocalist of the Year), Taylor Swift (Song of the Year for Little Big Town's "Better Man" – the latter of whom also won the Vocal Group of the Year award), and Keith Urban (Single of the Year for "Blue Ain't Your Color"), are among the notable winners at the 51st Country Music Association Awards. Brad Paisley and Carrie Underwood host the ceremony for the tenth consecutive year, which airs on ABC.	
8	Reports surface that the United States Department of Justice told AT&T it must sell off either DirecTV or the Turner Broadcasting System or seek alternative antitrust remedies in order to complete its acquisition of Time Warner. AT&T CEO Randall L. Stephenson indicated he has no plans to comply with the request, which could potentially lead to a court battle over the merits of holding up the merger's approval. Insiders expressed concern that President Trump may be using the merger as leverage against Turner-owned CNN over his perception of its coverage of him, calling into question whether the Antitrust Division's Assistant Attorney General Makan Delrahim was directed by the Trump administration to block the merger. It is later reported that Rupert Murdoch, chairman of 21st Century Fox, had contacted Stephenson on two occasions as to whether CNN will be put up for sale. The government officially sued AT&T on November 20, citing concerns over anti-competition. AT&T responded on November 28, accusing the Justice Department of "improper selective enforcement" of antitrust laws.	
9	Louis C.K.'s scheduled appearance on The Late Show with Stephen Colbert is cancelled as The New York Times publishes the story of five women who say the comedian had them watch as he masturbated in their presence. The debut of his film, I Love You, Daddy, set for the same night, is also cancelled. The fallout also resulted in HBO removing series and specials featuring the comedian from its cable channel and VOD platforms, including the year's "A Night of Too Many Stars" special on November 18, supporting autism awareness, and is later dropped by Netflix, FX Networks (including shows produced by his company), and his agency. Louis C.K. has since admitted via a statement from his publicist that the stories are true.	
10	Warner Bros. Television suspends Andrew Kreisberg from his duties at the studio and announces an investigation into sexual harassment claims made against him. This leads to Warner cutting ties with Kreisberg on November 29. Kreisberg most notably worked as showrunner of Arrow and the other series in the Warner-produced Arrowverse.	
10	Major companies (among them Keurig, 23andMe, Conagra Brands, Realtor.com, Eloquii, Nature's Bounty, and E-Trade) announce that they are pulling advertising from Fox News Channel's Hannity program after the host did an interview with Alabama Republican Senate candidate Roy Moore during his radio show to address the accusations made against the former judge involving sexual encounters with four women during his time as an assistant district attorney in 1979 when he was 32 (the women were under the age of 18, the youngest being 14), that made headlines in The Washington Post the previous day. Moore has denied the allegations but during the interview admitted that he had some feelings for underage girls (at the time) although he didn't elaborate or clarify further to Hannity, who implied on his radio show that the sexual encounter with a 14-year-old as described in the Post report was "consensual". Hannity later apologized and said he "misspoke", as Moore has denied any sexual encounters and does not recall ever meeting Leigh Corfman, the accuser who claimed Moore groped her at age 14. In response to the decision to pull the ads, viewers took to social media to target Keurig by destroying their products in protest.	
14	Philo – an Internet television founded in 2010 to provide streaming television service to colleges and universities – rolls out a national over-the-top MVPD service, becoming the third service to launch a live streaming TV offering in 2017. The basic service (consisting of 37 channels) is priced at $16 per month, with an add-on tier (incorporating nine additional channels) available for an additional $4 per month. The service – which can be viewed via Smart TVs, computers, tablets, and smartphones – includes entertainment-based cable channels operated by A&E Networks, AMC Networks, Discovery Communications, Scripps Networks Interactive and Viacom, which have invested a combined $25 million in Philo. Features include support for up to three concurrent streams per a single subscription; the abilities to pause live TV streams, start programs currently airing from the beginning, and to watch programs aired over the past three days; and a cloud DVR with unlimited storage that can retain recorded programming for 30 days after their original airdate.	
14	NBC News fires booking agent Matt Zimmerman after he was accused of inappropriate conduct with female employees at the network.	
15	The Shenandoah Valley Educational TV Corporation announces it will donate the licenses of PBS member stations WVPT/Staunton, Virginia and Front Royal satellite WVPY to the Commonwealth Public Broadcasting Corporation, owner of the Community Idea Stations member network (consisting of Richmond PBS stations WCVE-TV and WCVW, and WCVE satellite WHTJ/Charlottesville). The acquisition is completed by late February 2018.	
15	Laurel Haim (with Frank) became the second contestant to lose one million dollars in the bonus round on the U.S. Syndicated version of Wheel of Fortune at Epcot in Walt Disney World after incorrectly solving "Fried Zucchini". The Correct Bonus Puzzle Solution was "Baked Zucchini". Also, Laurel and Frank became the first couple to lose one million dollars in the bonus round after Pat Sajak opened the Million Dollar envelope by proclaiming "We don't want to see the million, but we did." This was also the second painful million dollar loss since April 2, 2015.	
16	In a 3–2 party line vote, the FCC votes to significantly relax rules on local media ownership, eliminating the newspaper-broadcast and radio-television cross-ownership rules, the Eight-Voices Test for television duopolies, the attribution rule applied to joint sales agreements and the retention of the disclosure rules for shared services agreements, as well as adding a waiver-style review process to the existing prohibition on common ownership of two of the four highest-rated stations within a market. The Commission plans to initiate an incubator program after it receives feedback, which it plans to use to promote and encourage diversity in broadcast ownership. Critics of the rulemaking – which was done outside of a Quadrennial Ownership Review under which such rule changes are typically made – suggest that it would accelerate broadcast ownership concentration and worsen existing issues with scant ownership of local media outlets by women and minorities.	
16	Granite Broadcasting announces it will sell the majority of the assets held by independent station KOFY-TV/San Francisco to Stryker Media 2 (a subsidiary of CNZ Communications, which serves as a corporate cousin to Poquito Mas Communications, owner of Crossings TV affiliate KCNZ-CD) for $6 million. The move comes after Granite sold KOFY's broadcast spectrum for $88.357 million in the FCC incentive auction, and the later formation of a channel sharing agreement with KCNZ-CD (under which KOFY would continue broadcasting over a subchannel of the low-power station) on October 30. Upon completion of the sale, CBS affiliate WTVH/Syracuse, New York becomes Granite's sole remaining television property	
19	Jeffrey Tambor announces that he would not continue in his role as Maura Pfefferman on the Amazon Studios/Sony Pictures Television series Transparent after four seasons amidst sexual allegations made against him by two people, including a transgender cast member.	
19	The 2017 American Music Awards, which was held at the Microsoft Theater in Los Angeles, California and hosted by Tracee Ellis Ross, airs on ABC. Bruno Mars was the night's big winner, earning seven awards.	
20	Journalist Charlie Rose is suspended by both CBS News and PBS pending an investigation into claims from eight different women that the host of CBS This Morning and his self-titled interview program groped them, made obscene phone calls and arranged to be naked in their presence. CBS fired Rose the next day, while PBS and Bloomberg Television rebike the show's means of survival by terminating their production and distribution agreements and business relationships with Rose. Rose later reaches out to staff to let them know they would be paid until the end of 2017 and their access to the show's taping facility ended on December 8. On December 4, PBS announced it would air episodes of CNN International's Amanpour in Rose's old time slot on an interim basis starting December 11.	
20	Dish Network pulls the owned stations and cable networks of the CBS Corporation: 28 local CBS and CW owned and operated stations in 18 markets across 26 states overall and a few MyNetworkTV and independent stations, as well as cable channels CBS Sports Network, Pop, and Smithsonian Channel, offering Bravo, Lifetime Movies, and beIN Sports in their place) after failing to reach a new re-transmission agreement. Subsidiary Showtime Networks, under a different agreement, was not affected. The blackout ended after a new deal was reached on November 23.	
20	The Metropolitan Atlanta Rapid Transit Authority issues an apology to The Weather Channel after a MARTA New Flyer Xcelsior bus accidentally blocks a live broadcast of the Georgia Dome implosion. The incident suddenly became a popular viral internet meme on social media.	
21	Actor and singer Jordan Fisher is crowned the winner of the 25th season of ABC's Dancing with the Stars. Fisher and his pro partner, Lindsay Arnold, beat violinist and composer Lindsey Stirling and her pro partner, Mark Ballas, to win the show's Mirror Ball trophy.	
26	Miss Universe 2017 is the 66th Miss Universe pageant, held at The AXIS at Planet Hollywood in Las Vegas, Nevada. Iris Mittenaere of France crowned her successor Demi-Leigh Nel-Peters of South Africa at the end of the event, becoming the second Miss Universe titleholder from that country after Margaret Gardiner won in 1978. The show, which aired on Fox and Azteca, was hosted by Steve Harvey and Ashley Graham, while Fergie and Rachel Platten performed. Carson Kressley joined runway coach and pageant expert Lu Sierra in the commentary and analysis table throughout the telecast. Contestants from 92 countries and territories participated in this year's pageant, surpassing the previous record of 89 contestants in 2011 and 2012, respectively.	
28	The 2017 Victoria's Secret Fashion Show is broadcast on CBS. 4.98 million people tune in the	
29	NBC News terminates Today anchor Matt Lauer after an employee filed a detailed complaint about inappropriate sexual behavior in the workplace. NBC News chairman Andrew Lack announced Lauer's termination, stating: "It represented, after serious review, a clear violation of our company's standards. As a result, we've decided to terminate his employment. While it is the first complaint about his behavior in the over twenty years he's been at NBC News, we were also presented with reason to believe this may not have been an isolated incident. Our highest priority is to create a workplace environment where everyone feels safe and protected, and to ensure that any actions that run counter to our core values are met with consequences, no matter who the offender.	
29	Another round of layoffs are initiated at ESPN, approximately 150 positions that are mostly behind the scenes rather than on-screen talent, according to company president John Skipper. This brings the total jobs lost since October 2015 to over 500 employees at the sports channel, as viewers continue to drop cable while ESPN is on the hook for the rights to several events. It was also announced that the primetime editions of SportsCenter carried by ESPNews will be terminated as of November 30. On-air staff would eventually leave the company through other means, including non-renewal of their contracts.	

=== December ===
Date	Event	Source
1	The Disney-owned cable channel Freeform expands its 25 Days of Christmas programming block across its company-owned sister networks (ABC, Disney Channel, Disney Junior and Disney XD). Launched in December 1996 on predecessor The Family Channel (and carried over after the channel's subsequent relaunches as Fox Family and ABC Family), the annual holiday programming block broadcasts holiday programming (such as Rankin/Bass, TV specials), as well as Christmas-themed made-for-television and theatrically released movies each year, and Christmas special episodes of the channel's original series.	
2	ABC News suspends chief investigative correspondent Brian Ross for four weeks, after he erroneously stated during a special report announcing Michael Flynn's guilty plea for making "false, fictitious and fraudulent statements" to the FBI regarding his conversations with Russia's U.S. ambassador, Sergey Kislyak, that Flynn was preparing to testify that Donald Trump had directed him to make contact with Russian officials during Trump's presidential campaign. Ross issued a clarification on that evening's World News Tonight, explaining that Flynn had not been told to make contact with Russian officials until after the election, and that Trump had only asked Flynn and other advisors to "find ways to repair relations with Russia and other world hot spots" during his campaign. The incorrect report was criticized by conservative commentators, and Trump claimed that the Dow Jones Industrial Average fell by 350 points because of the report.	
4	Discovery Communications buys an additional 24.5% stake in the Oprah Winfrey Network from Harpo Studios (the production company owned by network founder and CEO Oprah Winfrey) for $70 million. The acquisition will give Discovery 74.5% majority ownership of the lifestyle network.	
4	MSNBC cuts ties with progressive commentator Sam Seder, after alt-right social media personality Mike Cernovich circulates a now-deleted tweet from 2009, in which Seder mocked apologists of Roman Polanski's statutory rape conviction. As mentioned on November 30 on his Majority Report podcast, Seder alleges that Cernovich – whose own prior rape charge and apologetic/dismissive tweets about sexual assault came to light in consequence – intentionally took the tweet out of context in a smear campaign to "silence [Seder's] criticism of [Alabama Republican Senatorial candidate] Roy Moore and President Trump". Several left-wing commentators (among them, Slate political correspondent Jamelle Bouie, Mother Jones editor-in-chief Clara Jeffrey, Daily Beast senior editor Andrew Kirell, and Chris Hayes, host of MSNBC's All In) criticized the firing, saying that network management set a dangerous precedent that could empower others in the far right to damage the reputations of Trump and GOP critics in the media in a similar manner, as well as renewing criticism of MSNBC's dismissals of other progressive commentators over the past two years. On December 7, Seder was reinstated by MSNBC; in a statement to The Intercept, network president Phil Griffin apologized, stating "Sometimes you just get one wrong – and that's what happened here."	
4	CBS News correspondent Jeff Glor takes over as anchor of the CBS Evening News from interim Anthony Mason. His appointment as the program's lead anchor, announced on October 25, marks Glor's return to anchoring CBS News' flagship newscast, having served as anchor of the program's now-defunct weekend editions, first as the program's Saturday anchor from 2009 to 2010 and as its Sunday anchor from 2012 until 2016, when the weekend broadcasts were replaced by the CBSN-produced CBS Weekend News.	
4	NBCUniversal's Owned Television Stations division announces its intent to purchase the remainder of the stations owned by ZGS Communications for its Telemundo Station Group; with one exception of a station carrying various ethnic programming, all of the ten stations being purchased are Telemundo affiliates (and in the case of WZDC-CD/Washington, D.C., and WRDM-CD/Hartford, had been due to lose their affiliations due to the spectrum auction and NBC moving the Telemundo affiliations to subchannels of their respective owned NBC stations in each market). NBCUniversal had previously purchased four other ZGS stations between 2013 and 2016.	
5	Danny Masterson is fired from the Netflix sitcom The Ranch (which he had co-starred alongside his former That '70s Show castmate Ashton Kutcher, who will become the show's sole lead as a result of Masterson's dismissal) following the resurfacing of sexual assault allegations from 2002, that were investigated by police at the time but found to be without merit. His character is run out of town in the first half of season three before he ends up missing and presumed dead.	
5	During an interview on CNN's New Day, co-host Poppy Harlow admonishes Janet Porter, a spokeswoman for Alabama Senate Candidate Roy Moore, after she deflects from the primary topic to make a not-so-flattering comment about Harlow's pregnancy, at which point she was eight months pregnant and showing, telling her that Moore will protect her baby while his then-opponent, Democrat Doug Jones, will kill her child (which is inaccurate, as Jones has opposed a measure that would ban abortions after 20 weeks in most cases saying that he considered such a proposal too strict but also said he supports the current law in Alabama, which generally prohibits abortions after 22 weeks). In a responsive and respected tone, Harlow tells her to "leave my child out of this... Let's leave my child out of this," before getting back on topic. As pointed out by media outlets, they believe that Moore is using staffers and surrogates to bait the liberal media with tactics designed to discredit their reporting on him, a campaign ploy that eventually backfired on Moore that became a catalyst in Jones winning the Senate seat on December 12, giving Alabama its first Democrat Senator since 1992.	
5	During that night's edition of WPCH-TV/Atlanta's 9:00 p.m. newscast (which is produced by CBS-affiliated sister station WGCL-TV), weeknight co-anchor Sharon Reed, who is African American, makes an unannounced on-air address about an email sent by a female viewer, who accused Reed – whom the author referred to as a "niger", spelling the racial slur without a second "g", akin to the African country – of making a racial double standard with regards to a discussion in an earlier newscast about issues of race in the mayoral election between Atlanta city councilwomen Mary Norwood and Keisha Lance Bottoms (Bottoms is black and Norwood is white; Bottoms was elected mayor with 50.4% of the vote). Reed said the viewer mischaracterized what she said in the conversation, affirming that she never suggested white people could not talk about racial issues.	
8	After 29 years anchoring Univision's flagship evening newscast, María Elena Salinas steps down as co-anchor of Noticiero Univision, with plans to become an independent news producer following her departure from the news division. Salinas anchored the program with Jorge Ramos since 1988, and, along with Ramos, was presented with a Lifetime Achievement Award by the Academy of Television Arts and Sciences in 2012. Salinas will be replaced on the early evening edition of the program as well as the Sunday newsmagazine Aquí y Ahora by Ilia Calderón, veteran anchor of the network's daily newsmagazine Primer Impacto, who will make history as the first person of Afro-Latina heritage to anchor a daily national evening news program on a major U.S. television network.	
10	During a discussion on the KFOR-TV/Oklahoma City political talk show Flash Point about departing U.S. Sen. Al Franken (D-Minnesota), conservative panelist and former mayor Kirk Humphreys asks Oklahoma State Rep. Emily Virgin (D-Oklahoma City) – who substituted for liberal panelist Mike Turpen on that week's broadcast – asked why she and other Democrats had pushed for Franken to resign because of the allegations of groping levied against him but did not ask openly gay ex-Congressman Barney Frank (D-Massachusetts) to do the same. (Frank was never accused of any sexual improprieties while in or out of office.) In comparing the issue with moral beliefs on homosexuality, Humphreys said, "If it's OK, then it's OK for everybody and, quite frankly, it's OK for men to sleep with little boys." In a written statement, Humphreys apologized for the comment's apparent equation of homosexuality with pedophilia, while defending the right of himself and others to express their own moral beliefs. Following calls by individuals and groups including LGBT advocacy group Freedom Oklahoma for Humphreys to resign from that post over the prior two weeks, on December 21, Humphreys announced that he would resign as vice chairman of the University of Oklahoma Board of Regents at the start of the 2018 semester. He would continue to serve on the boards of Oklahoma Gas & Electric and Oklahoma City-based John W. Rex Charter Elementary School.	
11	Mario Batali abruptly takes a leave of absence from his role as co-host of the ABC cooking talk show The Chew, while the Food Network suspends plans for a revival of his 1996–2005 series Molto Mario amid allegations by four women, some of which stretch at least two decades, that Batali had sexually harassed them while they were working for the celebrity chef and restaurateur. The women disclosed in a story on the culinary news website Eater that Batali had either groped or conducted other inappropriate behavior during their employment by Batali at his restaurants. Batali was eventually fired from The Chew, 3 days later.	
11	KTTV/Los Angeles fires Steve Edwards, longtime co-host of the station's morning show Good Day L.A., after he was accused of inappropriate sexual behavior made by several current and former co-workers, a pattern that date back decades before joining KTTV in 1993 and reportedly continued while being employed at the Fox O&O.	
11	The NFL Network suspends analysts Marshall Faulk, Ike Taylor and Heath Evans pending an investigation brought on by a lawsuit filed in Los Angeles County Superior Court against NFL Enterprises by Jami Cantor, a wardrobe stylist who claims that she was sexually harassed and groped by the former NFL players and other NFL Network employees (including two that were not named as defendants) during her tenure. The suit also accuses former NFL Network executive producer Eric Weinberger (who was suspended as president of Bill Simmons Media Group) and sending several nude pictures of himself and sexually explicit text messages to Cantor, and Weinberger, former NFL Network analysts Donovan McNabb and Eric Davis, both of whom were suspended by ESPN, of making inappropriate comments.	
13	T-Mobile acquires startup cable provider Layer3 TV, and announces that it will launch an over-the-top subscription television service in 2018, which will compete with existing OTT services such as Sling TV, PlayStation Vue and DirecTV Now. The move will bring the company's signature "Un-carrier" approach to the pay television market.	
13	PBS announces the "indefinite suspension" of Tavis Smiley following an investigation involving the eponymous host, after he is accused of "multiple, credible" allegations of sexual misconduct that was brought forward to PBS by his alleged victims. The suspension makes it the second PBS late-night discussion program to have its distribution suspended, following the November cancellation of Charlie Rose, which had aired alongside Tavis Smiley on many PBS member stations/networks, after similar allegations of misconduct were levied against Rose.	
13	ABC fires Johnny Iuzzini and pulls the remaining third-season episodes of reality competition series The Great American Baking Show – on which he had served as a judge – amid sexual misconduct allegations levied in a Mic story, in which four former employees of Iuzzini's described instances in which he sexual harassed and abused them while working under him at a New York restaurant between 2009 and 2011. The story was a follow-up to a piece published on November 29, disclosing allegations by four other women came forward with allegations.	
13	CNN host Anderson Cooper's Twitter account is hacked and a tweet is posted calling President Trump a "tool" and a "pathetic loser". It has since been deleted and Cooper confirmed he did not post it himself.	
13	Activist DeRay Mckesson sues Fox News and Jeanine Pirro for defamation, alleging she made "false and defamatory statements" claiming he directed other protesters to commit violence that resulted in a police officer getting stuck in the face with a rock.	
14	The Walt Disney Company announces its intent to buy 21st Century Fox for $52.4 billion, pending regulatory approval. The deal involves the television and film studios, cable properties (FX, FXX, FX Movie Channel, National Geographic, and Nat Geo Wild), assets of Star TV, its television and film library and franchises, current programs in production, 20th Television (Fox's television distributor and syndicator), and an additional 30% stake in Hulu (in which Disney already held a 30% stake). The sale excludes the Fox network, MyNetworkTV, the Fox Television Stations, Fox News, Fox Business, and the national Fox Sports networks (Fox Sports 1, Fox Sports 2, Fox Soccer Plus, and the Big Ten Network), which will be transferred to a separate company. In return, the Murdoch family members will have a small stock in the deal with Disney. The sale also gives Fox a chance to expand their portfolio of television stations thanks in part to relaxation of television ownership rules from the FCC.	
15	KQED Life goes off the air after 13 years of service on PBS. Several cooking and lifestyle programs are moved to KQED Plus/San Jose and KQED 9/San Francisco.	
18	ESPN President John Skipper resigns from the network effective immediately. A statement from Skipper cites a substance addiction as the reason.	
18	Tegna Inc. announces it will purchase CBS/CW affiliate KFMB-TV/San Diego from Midwest Television for $325 million, a deal that also includes its sister radio stations KFMB-AM-FM. This gives Tegna its second television station in California (after ABC affiliate KXTV/Sacramento, which it acquired in 1999 as an arm of the Gannett Company) and the company's first radio properties as an independent entity (the group had last owned radio stations as a Gannett subsidiary in 1997, when it sold off nine stations, most of which went to Clear Channel Communications). The sale was finalized on February 15, 2018.	
19	Catt Sadler parts ways with E! after 12 years upon learning that her E! News co-host Jason Kennedy was earning "double" what she made in salary, claiming a gender pay gap and inequality at the Comcast-owned network.	
21	The FCC proposes a fine of over $13 million against Sinclair Broadcast Group for allegedly violating sponsorship identification rules. The fine, which would be the largest of its kind (Sinclair has 30 days to challenge or pay it), centers on over 1,700 instances of newscast reports and program-length specials on Sinclair stations, most of which were profiles of the Huntsman Cancer Institute that were sponsored by the Huntsman Cancer Foundation that supports the center. Sinclair had failed to disclose that the foundation was third-party sponsor of the reports, as required by law.	
22	Dick Clark Productions severs ties with the Miss America Organization, owners of the same-named annual pageant, in the wake of a Huffington Post report revealing internal organization e-mails that contained crude language disparaging former pageant winners, a scandal that leads to the departure of Miss America's president, chief operating officer, and board chair. DCP had produced ABC's telecast of the Miss America pageant since 2015.	
22	ABC News announces Elizabeth Vargas will depart the network in May 2018.	
24	Just hours after her contract wasn't renewed by MSNBC after a 12-year tenure as an analyst and contributor, sparking a backlash from viewers and progressives who happens to be her loyal followers, Joan Walsh is immediately hired by CNN for the same duties, which will begin in January 2018.	
26	The 40th Kennedy Center Honors, hosted by Caroline Kennedy, aired on CBS. The event, taped December 3, honors television creator/producer Norman Lear, rapper/actor LL Cool J, singer/songwriters Gloria Estefan and Lionel Richie and choreographer/dancer Carmen de Lavallade. The aforementioned honorees have been critical of President Donald Trump since he campaigned and won the 2016 Election, eventually prompting both Lear and de Lavallade to boycott a gala at the White House that was planned during the week of the event. On August 19, Trump announced that he would not attend the event, making it the fourth time in history that a sitting president passed on or did not attend the event.	

== Awards ==
Category/Organization	75th Golden Globe Awards January 7, 2018	8th Critics' Choice Television Awards January 11, 2018	Producers Guild and Screen Actors Guild Awards January 20–21, 2018	70th Primetime Emmy Awards September 17, 2018
Best Drama Series	The Handmaid's Tale			Game of Thrones
Best Comedy Series	The Marvelous Mrs. Maisel			
Best Limited Series	Big Little Lies		Black Mirror	The Assassination of Gianni Versace: American Crime Story
Best Actor in a Drama Series	Sterling K. Brown; This Is Us			Matthew Rhys; The Americans
Best Actress in a Drama Series	Elisabeth Moss; The Handmaid's Tale		Claire Foy; The Crown	
Best Supporting Actor in a Drama Series	—N/a	David Harbour; Stranger Things	—N/a	Peter Dinklage; Game of Thrones
Best Supporting Actress in a Drama Series	—N/a	Ann Dowd; The Handmaid's Tale	—N/a	Thandie Newton; Westworld
Best Actor in a Comedy Series	Aziz Ansari; Master of None	Ted Danson; The Good Place	William H. Macy; Shameless	Bill Hader; Barry
Best Actress in a Comedy Series	Rachel Brosnahan; The Marvelous Mrs. Maisel		Julia Louis-Dreyfus; Veep	Rachel Brosnahan; The Marvelous Mrs. Maisel
Best Supporting Actor in a Comedy Series	—N/a	Walton Goggins; Vice Principals	—N/a	Henry Winkler; Barry
Best Supporting Actress in a Comedy Series	—N/a	Mayim Bialik; The Big Bang Theory	—N/a	Alex Borstein; The Marvelous Mrs. Maisel
Best Actor in a Limited Series	Ewan McGregor; Fargo		Alexander Skarsgård; Big Little Lies	Darren Criss; The Assassination of Gianni Versace: American Crime Story
Best Actress in a Limited Series	Nicole Kidman; Big Little Lies			Regina King; Seven Seconds
Best Supporting Actor in a Limited Series	Alexander Skarsgård; Big Little Lies		—N/a	Jeff Daniels; Godless
Best Supporting Actress in a Limited Series	Laura Dern; Big Little Lies		—N/a	Merritt Wever; Godless

== Television programs ==
=== Miniseries ===
First aired	Title	Channel	Source
January 24	The New Edition Story	BET	
February 1	Madiba	BET	
February 27	When We Rise	ABC	
April 16	The White Princess	Starz	
April 23	This is Life Live	TLC	
July 9	The Nineties	CNN	
August 4	Wet Hot American Summer: Ten Years Later	Netflix	
August 9	The Story of Diana	ABC	
August 18	Marvel's The Defenders	Netflix	
October 27	Cut	MBC 2 / MBC Max / MBC 4 / MBC Action	
November 22	Godless	Netflix	
November 24	Trailer Park Boys Out of the Park: USA	Netflix	

=== Television films and specials ===
First aired	Title	Channel	Source
January 12	Taking the Stage: African American Music and Stories That Changed America	ABC	
January 16	Rufus 2	Nickelodeon	
February 7	Michael Bolton's Big, Sexy Valentine's Day Special	Netflix	
March 10	Tangled: Before Ever After	Disney Channel	
May 7	The Last 100 Days of Diana	ABC	
May 24	Dirty Dancing	ABC	
June 4	Ariana Grande's One Love Manchester Benefit Concert Live	ABC/Freeform	
July 21	Descendants 2	Disney Channel	
August 6	Sharknado 5: Global Swarming	Syfy	
August 12	Jojo Siwa: My World	Nickelodeon	
October 9	Escape from Mr. Lemoncello's Library	Nickelodeon	
October 27	Michael Jackson's Halloween	CBS	
November 11	The Magical Wand Chase	HBO	
November 21	Beat Bugs: All Together Now	Netflix	
November 24	Trolls Holiday	NBC	
November 24	Hey Arnold!: The Jungle Movie	Nickelodeon	
November 26	A Very Merry Toy Store	Lifetime	
November 27	Angry Angel	Freeform	
November 30	The Wonderful World of Disney: Magical Holiday Celebration	ABC	
December 1	DreamWorks Home for the Holidays	Netflix	
December 2	Tiny Christmas	Nickelodeon	
December 7	Psych: The Movie	USA Network	
December 14	Olaf's Frozen Adventure	ABC	
December 17	A Christmas Story Live!	Fox	

=== Programs changing networks ===
Show	Moved from	Moved to	Source
Archer	FX	FXX	
Nashville	ABC	CMT	
Backstage	Disney Channel	Netflix	
Miraculous: Tales of Ladybug & Cat Noir	Nickelodeon	Netflix	
The Fairly OddParents	Nickelodeon	Nicktoons	
Harvey Beaks	Nickelodeon	Nicktoons	
Bunsen Is a Beast	Nickelodeon	Nicktoons	
Teenage Mutant Ninja Turtles	Nickelodeon	Nicktoons	
Teenage Mutant Ninja Turtles	Nicktoons	Nickelodeon	
The Dude Perfect Show	CMT	Nickelodeon	
The Chris Gethard Show	Fusion	TruTV	
The Shannara Chronicles	MTV	Spike	
The Hunt with John Walsh	CNN / HLN	HLN	
RuPaul's Drag Race	Logo TV	VH1	
90's House	MTV	MTV2	
Loosely Exactly Nicole	MTV	Facebook Watch	

=== Programs returning in 2017 ===
The following shows returned with new episodes or reruns after being canceled or having ended their run previously:

Show	Last aired	Type of Return	Previous channel	New/returning/same channel	Return date	Source
The Celebrity Apprentice (as The New Celebrity Apprentice)	2015	New season	NBC	same	January 2	
One Day at a Time	1984	Remake	CBS	Netflix	January 6	
Samurai Jack	2004	Revival	Cartoon Network	Adult Swim	March 11	
Prison Break	2009	New season	Fox	same	April 4	
Ben 10	2008	Reboot	Cartoon Network	same	April 10	
Mystery Science Theater 3000	1999	Revival	Sci-Fi Channel	Netflix	April 14	
Fargo	2015	New season	FX	same	April 19	
My Super Sweet 16	2008	New season	MTV	same	May 14	
Twin Peaks	1991	Revival	ABC	Showtime	May 21	
Love Connection	1999	Revival	First-run syndication	Fox	May 25	
Fear Factor	2012	Revival	NBC	MTV	May 30	
The Gong Show	1989	Revival	First-run syndication	ABC	June 22	
Battle of the Network Stars	1988	Revival	ABC	same	June 29	
Cold Justice	2015	New season	TNT	Oxygen	July 22	
Man v. Food	2012	New season	Travel Channel	same	August 7	
Saturday Night Live Weekend Update Thursday (as Weekend Update Summer Edition)	2012	New season	NBC	same	August 10	
DuckTales	1990	Reboot	First-run syndication	Disney XD	August 12	
Wacky Races	1968	Reboot	CBS	Boomerang; Boomerang SVOD	August 14	
MTV Unplugged	2014	Revival	MTV	same	September 8	
Will & Grace	2006	Revival	NBC	same	September 28	
Curb Your Enthusiasm	2011	New season	HBO	same	October 1	
Total Request Live	2008	Revival	MTV	same	October 2	
Dynasty	1989	Reboot	ABC	The CW	October 11	
Cyberchase	2015	New season	PBS Kids	same	October 23	
The Joker's Wild	1991	Reboot	First-run syndication	TBS	October 24	
MythBusters	2016	New season	Discovery Channel	Science	November 15	
Cash Cab	2012	Revival	Discovery Channel	same	December 4	

=== Milestone episodes ===
Show	Network	Episode #	Episode title	Episode air date	Source
Teen Mom 2	MTV	100th	"Deja Vu"	January 9	
Days of Our Lives	NBC	13,000th	"episode 13,000"	January 10	
America's Funniest Home Videos	ABC	600th	"AFV 600"	January 15	
Adventure Time	Cartoon Network	250th	"Islands Part 6: Min & Marty"	February 1	
Law & Order: Special Victims Unit	NBC	400th	"Motherly Love"	February 8	
America's Next Top Model	VH1	300th	"Celebrity Life"	February 15	
SpongeBob SquarePants	Nickelodeon	200th	"Goodbye, Krabby Patty?"	February 20	
Conan	TBS	1,000th	N/A	March 1	
Survivor	CBS	500th	"The Stakes Have Been Raised"	March 8	
Love Thy Neighbor	OWN	100th	"Digging The Hole Deeper"	March 11	
Dancing with the Stars	ABC	400th	"First Dances/400th Episode Week"	March 20	
Scandal	ABC	100th	"The Decision"	April 13	
My Little Pony: Friendship is Magic	Discovery Family	150th	"Parental Glideance"	May 20	
Clarence	Cartoon Network	100th	"Clarence's Stormy Sleepover Episode 6: Flood Brothers"	June 5	
Nashville	CMT	100th	"(Now and Then There's) A Fool Such as I"	June 15	
Chelsea	Netflix	100th	"Tear Down These Walls"	June 16	
Love & Hip Hop: Atlanta	VH1	100th	"Reality Bites"	June 19	
The Tonight Show Starring Jimmy Fallon	NBC	700th	"Pharrell Williams/Chris Coffer/Vince Staples"	June 26	
Whose Line Is It Anyway?	The CW	300th	N/A	July 10	
The Haves and the Have Nots	OWN	100th	"Railroad"	July 25	
Cops	Spike	1,000th	"Cops: Beyond the Bust"	August 21	
DreamWorks Dragons	Netflix	100th	"The Wings of War, Part 1"	August 25	
Suits	USA Network	100th	"100"	August 30	
Teen Wolf	MTV	100th	"The Wolves Of War"	September 24	
The Daily Show	Comedy Central	3,000th	"America Ferrera"	September 27	
The Walking Dead	AMC	100th	"Mercy"	October 22	
The Goldbergs	ABC	100th	"Jackie Likes Star Trek"	October 25	
Rachael Ray	First-run syndication	2,000th	"Rachael Celebrates Her 2,000th Show With...Oprah Winfrey"	October 26	
Keeping Up With the Kardashians	E!	200th	"Catch Me If You Cannes"	October 28	
Will & Grace	NBC	200th	"Rosario's Quinceañera"	November 2	
PAW Patrol	Nickelodeon	100th	Sea Patrol:Pups Save a Frozen Flounder/Sea Patrol:Pups Save a Narwhal	November 6	
Grey's Anatomy	ABC	300th	"Who Lives, Who Dies, Who Tells Your Story"	November 9	
Teen Titans Go!	Cartoon Network	200th	"Thanksgetting"	November 17	
NCIS: Los Angeles	CBS	200th	"This Is What We Do"	November 19	
The Middle	ABC	200th	"The 200th"	December 5	
Brooklyn Nine-Nine	Fox	100th	"Game Night"	December 12	
Major Crimes	TNT	100th	"Conspiracy Theory: Part 3"	December 19	

=== Programs ending in 2017 ===
End date	Show	Channel	First aired	Status	Source
January 2	Gamer's Guide to Pretty Much Everything	Disney XD	2015	Cancelled	
January 6	The Kelly File	Fox News	2013	Ended	
January 7	Ultimate Spider-Man	Disney XD	2012	Ended	
January 16	Regular Show (returned in 2026 as Regular Show: The Lost Tapes)	Cartoon Network	2010	Ended	
January 17	No Tomorrow	The CW	2016	Cancelled	
January 20	Girl Meets World	Disney Channel	2014	Cancelled	
January 25	Salem	WGN America	2014	Cancelled	
January 25	Incorporated	Syfy	2016	Cancelled	
January 25	Frequency	The CW	2016	Cancelled	
January 26	Pure Genius	CBS	2016	Cancelled	
January 27	Z: The Beginning of Everything	Amazon Video	2015	Cancelled	
January 29	Conviction	ABC	2016	Cancelled	
January 30	The Odd Couple	CBS	2015	Cancelled	
February 2	Kirby Buckets	Disney XD	2014	Cancelled	
February 5	Dora and Friends: Into the City!	Nickelodeon	2014	Cancelled	
February 6	K. Michelle: My Life	VH1	2014	Ended	
February 7	Ladies of London (returned in 2026)	Bravo	2014	Ended	
February 11	Oprah: Where Are They Now?	Oprah Winfrey Network	2012	Ended	
February 13	The Celebrity Apprentice	NBC	2008	Cancelled	
February 13	Sheriff Callie's Wild West	Disney Jr.	2014	Cancelled	
February 19	Son of Zorn	Fox	2016	Cancelled	
February 22	Fox Sports Live	FS1	2013	Cancelled	
February 22	Garbage Time with Katie Nolan	FS1	2015	Cancelled	
February 28	Celebrity Name Game	Syndication	2014	Cancelled	
March 3	Emerald City	NBC	2017	Cancelled	
March 5	Mercy Street	PBS	2016	Cancelled	
March 8	Man Seeking Woman	FXX	2015	Cancelled	
March 10	The Vampire Diaries	The CW	2009	Ended	
March 14	The Real O'Neals	ABC	2016	Cancelled	
March 15	Workaholics	Comedy Central	2011	Ended	
March 15	Jeff & Some Aliens	Comedy Central	2017	Cancelled	
March 17	60 Minutes Sports	Showtime	2013	Cancelled	
March 24	Liv and Maddie	Disney Channel	2013	Ended	
March 26	Time After Time	ABC	2017	Cancelled	
March 28	Bones	Fox	2005	Ended	
March 29	Duck Dynasty (returned in 2025)	A&E	2012	Ended	
March 30	Review	Comedy Central	2014	Ended	
March 31	Grimm	NBC	2011	Ended	
March 31	Dr. Ken	ABC	2015	Cancelled	
March 31	Sleepy Hollow	Fox	2013	Cancelled	
April 2	Black Sails	Starz	2014	Ended	
April 7	The Get Down	Netflix	2016	Cancelled	
April 11	Switched at Birth	Freeform	2011	Ended	
April 13	The Blacklist: Redemption	NBC	2017	Cancelled	
April 14	You the Jury	Fox	2017	Cancelled	
April 16	Girls (returning in 2027)	HBO	2012	Ended	
April 17	2 Broke Girls	CBS	2011	Cancelled	
April 17	24: Legacy	Fox	2017	Cancelled	
April 20	Powerless	NBC	2017	Cancelled	
April 21	The O'Reilly Factor	Fox News	1996	Cancelled	
April 21	Girlboss	Netflix	2017	Cancelled	
April 24	APB	Fox	2017	Cancelled	
April 24	Bates Motel	A&E	2013	Ended	
April 25	Outsiders	WGN America	2016	Cancelled	
April 28	Rosewood	Fox	2015	Cancelled	
April 30	American Crime	ABC	2015	Cancelled	
May 2	Bad Girls Club	Oxygen	2006	Cancelled	
May 8	The Great Indoors	CBS	2016	Cancelled	
May 10	Underground	WGN America	2016	Cancelled	
May 11	The Catch	ABC	2016	Cancelled	
May 12	I Love Dick	Amazon Video	2016	Cancelled	
May 14	Chicago Justice	NBC	2017	Cancelled	
May 17	Criminal Minds: Beyond Borders	CBS	2016	Cancelled	
May 20	Samurai Jack	Adult Swim	2001	Ended	
May 20	Training Day	CBS	2017	Cancelled	
May 21	Making History	Fox	2017	Cancelled	
May 22	Baby Daddy	Freeform	2012	Ended	
May 26	Bloodline	Netflix	2015	Cancelled	
May 30	Imaginary Mary	ABC	2017	Cancelled	
May 31	Right Now Kapow	Disney XD	2016	Cancelled	
June 4	The Gorburger Show	Comedy Central	2017	Cancelled	
June 4	The Leftovers	HBO	2014	Ended	
June 16	Reign	The CW	2013	Ended	
June 20	Biz Kids	Syndication (exclusive to select PBS stations)	2008	Cancelled	
June 21	EyeOpener	Syndication (exclusive to select CW and MyNetworkTV stations owned by Tribune Broadcasting)	2011	Cancelled	
June 21	Lopez	TV Land	2016	Cancelled	
June 27	Downward Dog	ABC	2017	Cancelled	
June 27	Pretty Little Liars	Freeform	2010	Ended	
June 29	For the Record with Greta	MSNBC	2017	Cancelled	
June 30	Uncle Grandpa	Cartoon Network	2013	Cancelled	
June 30	Gypsy	Netflix	2017	Cancelled	
July 13	Steve Harvey	Syndication	2012	Ended	
July 14	Playing House	USA Network	2014	Cancelled	
July 23	Spartan: Ultimate Team Challenge	NBC	2016	Cancelled	
July 24	Kate Plus 8	TLC	2007	Cancelled	
July 26	The Fairly OddParents	Nicktoons	2001	Cancelled	
July 28	Penn Zero: Part-Time Hero	Disney XD	2014	Ended	
July 31	Daytime Divas	VH1	2017	Cancelled	
August 2	Kingdom	Audience	2014	Ended	
August 4	@midnight (returned in 2024 as After Midnight)	Comedy Central	2013	Ended	
August 9	The Carmichael Show	NBC	2015	Cancelled	
August 12	Doubt	CBS	2017	Cancelled	
August 12	Orphan Black	BBC America	2013	Ended	
August 12	Turn: Washington's Spies	AMC	2014	Ended	
August 14	Stitchers	Freeform	2015	Cancelled	
August 20	Legends of Chamberlain Heights	Comedy Central	2016	Cancelled	
August 24	The Mist	Spike	2017	Cancelled	
August 24	Saturday Night Live Weekend Update Thursday	NBC	2008	Cancelled	
August 25	Dark Matter	Syfy	2015	Cancelled	
August 31	The Night Shift	NBC	2014	Cancelled	
September 3	Twin Peaks	Showtime	2017	Ended	
September 4	Will	TNT	2017	Cancelled	
September 6	Blood Drive	Syfy	2017	Cancelled	
September 7	Fox News Specialists	Fox News	2017	Cancelled	
September 8	One Mississippi	Amazon Video	2015	Cancelled	
September 8	T.D. Jakes	Syndication	2016	Cancelled	
September 8	The Insider	Syndication	2004	Ended	
September 12	Betty White's Off Their Rockers	Lifetime	2012	Cancelled	
September 17	The Strain	FX	2014	Ended	
September 19	Somewhere Between	ABC	2017	Cancelled	
September 21	Zoo	CBS	2015	Cancelled	
September 22	Today's Take	NBC	2000	Ended	
September 24	Teen Wolf	MTV	2011	Ended	
September 25	People of Earth	TBS	2016	Cancelled	
September 26	Difficult People	Hulu	2015	Cancelled	
September 29	Real Rob	Netflix	2015	Cancelled	
October 8	Dice	Showtime	2016	Cancelled	
October 8	Episodes	Showtime	2011	Ended	
October 14	Halt and Catch Fire	AMC	2014	Ended	
October 15	Survivor's Remorse	Starz	2014	Ended	
October 20	Haters Back Off	Netflix	2016	Cancelled	
November 1	Mutt & Stuff	Nick Jr. Channel	2015	Ended	
November 2	Mary Mary	We TV	2012	Ended	
November 9	Ice Road Truckers	History	2007	Ended	
November 10	Inhumans	ABC	2017	Cancelled	
November 10	Lady Dynamite	Netflix	2016	Cancelled	
November 12	Teenage Mutant Ninja Turtles (returned in 2018)	Nickelodeon	2012	Ended	
November 12	Vice Principals	HBO	2016	Ended	
November 13	Sewing with Nancy	Syndication	1982	Ended	
November 14	The Mindy Project	Hulu	2012	Ended	
November 17	Longmire	Netflix	2012	Ended	
November 17	Charlie Rose	PBS	1991	Cancelled	
November 22	The Shannara Chronicles	Spike	2016	Cancelled	
November 27	Fashion Police	E!	2010	Ended	
November 29	Chance	Hulu	2016	Cancelled	
December 1	East Los High	Hulu	2013	Ended	
December 6	Shut Eye	Hulu	2016	Cancelled	
December 10	Graves	Epix	2016	Cancelled	
December 10	White Famous	Showtime	2017	Cancelled	
December 12	The Mayor	ABC	2017	Cancelled	
December 13	Tavis Smiley	PBS	2004	Cancelled	
December 15	Chelsea	Netflix	2016	Cancelled	
December 15	The Exorcist	Fox	2016	Cancelled	
December 15	Jean-Claude Van Johnson	Amazon Video	2017	Cancelled	
December 16	Dirk Gently's Holistic Detective Agency	BBC America	2016	Cancelled	
December 29	Harvey Beaks	Nicktoons	2015	Ended	

=== Entering syndication this year ===
A list of programs (current or canceled) that have accumulated enough episodes (between 65 and 100) or seasons (three or more) to be eligible for off-network syndication and/or basic cable runs.

Show	Seasons	In Production	Source
Madam Secretary	3	Yes	
Mom	5	Yes	
The Goldbergs	5	Yes	
Brooklyn Nine-Nine	5	Yes	
Impractical Jokers	6	Yes	
Dateline	25	Yes	

== Networks and services ==
=== Network launches ===
Network	Type	Launch date	Notes	Source
PBS Kids	Over-the-air multicast	January 16	The 24/7 digital broadcast network, available on many PBS member stations as a digital subchannel (particularly those that in previous years, PBS had routinely supplied content for their independently programmed, kid-targeted subchannels), and through apps and streaming services, features a broad mix of the public television service's current inventory of children's programming. The PBS Kids channel marks PBS' third national children's television network venture; the service operated a DirecTV-funded cable/satellite channel from 1999 to 2005, and formerly co-owned Sprout in conjunction with Comcast and several minority partners from 2005 to 2013. It also acted as a de facto replacement for the Spanish-language network V-me, which is converting to a conventional cable-distributed and ad-supported model.	
Primo TV	Cable television	January 16		
TBD	Over-the-air multicast	February 13	Owned by Sinclair Broadcast Group and operated by Jukin Media, initially soft-launching on five Sinclair-owned-or-operated stations in Des Moines, Green Bay, Portland, San Antonio, and Syracuse, the network features programming and content originating from various premium internet partners catering to millennial audiences.	
Charge!	Over-the-air multicast	February 28	Operating as a joint venture between Sinclair Broadcast Group and MGM Television, which also jointly own the science fiction-focused multicast network Comet, Charge focuses on action- and adventure-themed films, as well as a very limited number of television series, sourced primarily from the MGM library.	
Hallmark Drama	Cable television network	October 1	A sister channel to both Hallmark Channel and Hallmark Movies & Mysteries airing older light dramatic series and Hallmark Channel's films.	
Nuestra Vision	Cable television	November 21		

=== Network conversions ===
Old network name	New network name	Type	Conversion Date	Notes	Source
Smile of a Child	Smile	OTA multicast, Cable and satellite	January 1	The Christian-based children's channel owned by TBN, Smile of a Child, silently rebranded as simply Smile on this date.	
One World Sports	Eleven Sports Network	Cable and satellite	March 16		
QVC Plus	QVC2	Cable television	April 1		
Universal HD	Olympic Channel	Cable and satellite	July 14	A high definition-exclusive network that originated as Bravo HD+ in July 2003, the network declined to featuring mainly repeats from the Universal Television library, along with lower-profile Universal Pictures films, and was shut down due to those issues. Comcast division Xfinity let the network's fate be known through a legal notice on the provider's website. The same day, Comcast, the International Olympic Committee and the United States Olympic Committee launched an Americanized version of its Olympic Channel (sub-branded as "The Home of Team USA") using Universal HD's existing satellite slot (and all existing cable/satellite carriage, albeit with some providers moving it to their sports tier), which featured much of the Olympic sports content that moved to Universal HD after Universal Sports Network's 2015 closure, and carried rolling news and medals stand coverage during the 2018 Winter Olympics. The network remained exclusively offered in HD.	
American Sports Network	Stadium	OTA multicast, OTT free streaming	August 24	The three-year-old syndication network run by Sinclair Broadcast Group was integrated with Silver Chalice's Internet-based products, the live sports streaming service Campus Insiders and the studio-based 120 Sports. The full transition of ASN's terrestrial outlets into Stadium followed in September.	
Sprout	Universal Kids	Cable and satellite	September 9	NBCUniversal Cable Entertainment Group converted Sprout's general branding on this date to Universal Kids, which caters to a pre-teen and family audience in primetime, and features content from NBCU-owned DreamWorks Animation, as well as child-specific reality shows such as Top Chef Junior and The Voice Kids, along with international children's programming previously unseen in the United States. However, Sprout's preschool-specific programming remains a major part of the schedule, as a programming block airing from 3:00 a.m. to 6:00 p.m. ET (12:00 a.m. to 3:00 p.m. PT).	
Centric	BET Her	Cable and satellite	September 25	Viacom Media Networks announced in April 2017, that they would rebrand Centric, BET's sister network for older African-American women viewers, to BET Her, the rebranding took place on September 25, 2017. No major changes in the network's programming direction was planned, outside of uniting branding efforts among the properties of VMN subsidiary BET Networks.	
Retirement Living TV	Newsy	Cable and satellite	December 31	A network aimed at adults 50+ which launched in 2006, began to shift to an online-only model after the E. W. Scripps Company purchased the contractual rights to RLTV's carriage agreements from Retirement Living TV, LLC for up to $23 million on September 5. The channel was replaced in most homes (unless declined by a provider) by Scripps' millennial-targeted OTT news channel Newsy, which, under the agreement, expanded its national distribution to about 40 million cable homes by the end of 2018. (Newsy was already carried on many OTT pay television providers, including YouTube TV and Sling TV at the time of the announcement.)	

=== Network closures ===
Network	Type	Closure date	Notes	Source
Northwest Cable News	Regional cable and over-the-air (Pacific Northwest)	January 6	Launched in December 1995 by the Providence Journal Company, the Tegna Media-owned Seattle-based news channel drew resources and content from Tegna stations in Seattle, Portland, Spokane, and Boise. NWCN's shutdown on this date comes after the retirements or contract buyouts of several high-profile on- and off-screen talent in April 2016, and also comes at a time when the channel's viewership decreased in the face of increased news consumption on other non-TV platforms, along with all the associated stations carrying full newscast replays on their websites, in addition to KTVB's carriage ending due to a corporate mandate to carry the Justice Network. Approximately 25 employees were affected, more than half of whom moved to new positions at other Tegna stations.	
Gun TV	Broadcast and cable syndication and online streaming	January 9	A short-lived attempt to use the traditional format of home shopping to the sale of firearms, which required the use of wholesalers shipping to federally licensed-dealers rather than the items being shipped direct to the consumer, Gun TV was stunted by several factors, including on-air demonstration limitations, low-level carriage through Tuff TV, the American Sports Network and brokered programming arrangements through pay TV providers, only being carried in overnights, and a launch announcement which came out about the time of the December 2015 San Bernardino shootings, which most distribution partners declined to carry the network over it. Gun TV lasted only nine months after its April 1, 2016 launch.	
Cloo	Cable and satellite	February 1	The channel launched in 1994 as the CBC-owned arts and culture channel Trio, and was eventually acquired by NBCUniversal, which later converted the channel to Sleuth in 2006, carrying crime and mystery content from the NBCUniversal library. Under Comcast's ownership, the channel rebranded to Cloo in August 2011, but declined due to a drift in format, no original programming output, the easy availability of its programming through other outlets, and its discontinuation of carriage by several key cable/satellite providers.	
The Works	OTA digital broadcast	February 27	Launched in January 2015, the MGM-owned general entertainment multicast network featured a mix of feature films, classic television sitcoms and drama series from the 1950s through the 1980s, and some limited news and interview programming. The majority of the network's former affiliates, most of which were owned by Titan Broadcast Management, replaced The Works with Sinclair Broadcast Group/MGM joint venture network Charge!, when that network launched on February 28.	
Esquire Network	Cable and satellite	June 28	The Comcast-owned network launched in 1998 as Style, but rebranded to Esquire in 2013 (under a license deal with Esquire publisher Hearst Corporation) in an effort to reach male viewers. It was originally scheduled to replace G4, which was later shut down, but the plan was changed due to G4's lack of satellite distribution, which Esquire lost in subsequent contract cycles. Esquire's viability diminished after DirecTV dropped the channel in December 2016 over low viewership and carriage fees, Charter/Spectrum followed suit; it ended carriage of it and Chiller on April 25 nationwide. Some programming migrated to other NBCU networks, such as Friday Night Tykes moving to USA Network as a lead-out from WWE Raw in April.	
Spectrum Sports (New York)	Regional cable (Upstate New York)	October 5	The 14-year-old regional sports network, formed as the result of Empire Sports Network's then-ongoing collapse in 2003, was shut down on this date, with Charter Communications citing a desire to consolidate its programming into a single destination channel, another possible factor was the launch of a rival network, MSG Western New York, a year prior; that network had the backing of Buffalo sports giant Pegula Sports and Entertainment. Existing programming on the network was merged into Spectrum News and migrated to online platforms.	
Seeso	OTT subscription streaming	November 8	Launched on January 16, 2016, by NBCUniversal Digital Enterprises under its founder Evan Shapiro, the service, which focused on the Comedy genre utilizing original content and a library of properties from the NBCUniversal vaults, shut down operations on this date per an announcement made on August 9. That announcement came just three months after Shapiro exited the company and in light of increased competition from rival streaming services as well as lackluster interest from viewers. The original programming that was featured on Seeso (including HarmonQuest, My Brother, My Brother and Me, Hidden America with Jonah Ray and The Cyanide & Happiness Show) moved over to the online video app VRV, while upcoming programs that had been in development were expected to find new homes before it ceased operations.	
InfoMás	Regional cable (Florida)	November 20	As announced on October 31, Charter Communications discontinued the Spanish language regional cable news network serving the Tampa Bay and Orlando markets on this date, citing the fact that most Hispanic and Latino American viewers in Central Florida that subscribe to Charter Spectrum were drawn more to InfoMás' English language counterpart networks Bay News 9 and News 13, (the Spanish language outlets of both networks, Bay News 9 en Español and Central Florida News 13 en Español, were consolidated to form InfoMás in 2011.) Segments and most personnel from InfoMás moved to those respective channels.	
Spectrum Sports (Florida)	Regional cable (Florida)	December 16	The former Bright House Sports Network, like its New York counterpart, ceased operations on this date. In contrast to the New York channel, most of its programming was canceled, with some content possibly moving online.	
Chiller	Cable and satellite	December 31	Another NBCUniversal/Comcast-owned network, which had little carriage on Comcast and Xfinity systems, the ten year-old horror/thriller film network, which had absorbed Fearnet at the end of July 2014, had lost nearly all its carriage in the space of a year, with Spectrum, Dish, Cox and Verizon Fios all dropping the network due to most of its content being duplicated easily on streaming services and other networks, and effectively sealing its fate as a going concern.	
Retirement Living TV	Cable television	December 31	See Newsy entry	

== Television stations ==
=== Station launches ===
Date	Market	Station	Channel	Affiliation	Source
January 1	Boston, Massachusetts (Lawrence)	WMFP	60.5	NBC (simulcast of WBTS-LD)	
January 6	Bowling Green, Kentucky	WCZU-LD7	39.7	Cozi TV	
February 11	Columbus, Nebraska	KMJF-LD	48.2	Telemundo	
February 15	Lake Charles, Louisiana	KSWL-LD	17.1	CBS	
March 15	San Diego, California	XHDTV-TDT	49.2	Azteca America (temporary home)	
June 1	Charlotte, North Carolina (Kannapolis)	WAXN-TV	64.4	Laff (migrated from sister station WSOC-DT2)	
June 1	St. Joseph, Missouri	KNPG-LD	21.3	Telemundo	
June 21	Lincoln, Nebraska	KFDY-LD	27.2	Telemundo	
July 1	San Diego, California	KNSD	39.20	Telemundo	
July 1	Lafayette, Indiana	WPBY-LD	35.1	ABC	
August 7	Chicago, Illinois	WGBO-DT4	60.4	Justice Network	
August 31	Lake Charles, Louisiana	KPLC-DT4	7.4	Grit	
September 6	Fort Wayne, Indiana	WCUH-LD	16.1	Azteca America	
September 6	Terre Haute, Indiana	WTHI-DT4	10.4	Ion Television (migrated from WTHI-DT3)	
September 25	Duluth, Minnesota/Superior, Wisconsin; Hibbing, Minnesota	WDIO-DT3; WIRT-DT3	10.3; 13.3	Ion Television	
October 9	Lansing, Michigan	WSYM-DT4	47.4	MyNetworkTV (migrated from WHTV)	
November 4	Fairbanks, Alaska	KATN-DT3	2.3	The CW (migrated from KATN-DT2)	

=== Stations changing network affiliation ===
Date	Market	Station	Channel	Prior affiliation	New affiliation	Source
January 1	Boston, Massachusetts (Merrimack, New Hampshire)	WHDH	7.1	NBC	Independent	
January 1	Boston, Massachusetts (Merrimack, New Hampshire)	WBTS-LD	8.1	Independent/Cozi TV	NBC	
January 1	Boston, Massachusetts (Merrimack, New Hampshire)	WNEU-DT2	60.2	Independent/Cozi TV	NBC	
January 1	Wilmington, North Carolina	WILM-LD	10.1	CBS	Independent	
January 1	Wilmington, North Carolina	WWAY-DT2	3.2	The CW	CBS	
January 1	Wilmington, North Carolina	WWAY-DT3	3.3	Cozi TV	The CW	
January 18	Albuquerque, New Mexico	KASA-TV	2.1	Fox	Telemundo	
January 18	Albuquerque, New Mexico	KRQE-DT2	13.2	GetTV	Fox	
January 29	Kingsport, Tennessee	WKPT-TV	19.1	MyNetworkTV	Cozi TV	
January 29	Kingsport, Tennessee	WKPT-TV	19.3	Cozi TV	Laff	
January 29	Kingsport, Tennessee	WAPK-CD	36.3	Laff	Bounce TV	
March 1	Buffalo, New York (Springville)	WBBZ-DT2	67.2	This TV	Heroes & Icons	
May 1	San Diego, California	KFMB-DT2	8.2	MeTV	temporarily vacant	
May 1	San Diego, California	KGTV-DT2	10.2	Transitional newscast loop (instituted after disaffiliation from Azteca América)	MeTV	
May 1	San Diego, California	KZSD-LP	41	Transitional newscast loop (instituted after disaffiliation from Azteca América)	MeTV	
May 31	San Diego, California	XETV-TDT	6.1	The CW	Canal 5	
May 31	San Diego, California	KFMB-DT2	8.2	temporarily vacant	The CW	
June 1	St. Joseph, Missouri	KBJO-LD	30.1	Telemundo (migrated to sister station KNPG-LD3)	CBS (as KCJO-LD)	
June 1	Charlotte, North Carolina	WSOC-DT2	9.2	Laff	Telemundo	
June 21	Lincoln, Nebraska	KFDY-LD	27.2	3ABN Proclaim	Telemundo (3ABN moved to digital channel 27.3 in June)	
June 23	Milwaukee, Wisconsin (Fond du Lac)	WIWN	68.1	Sonlife	Cozi TV (Sonlife moved to digital channel 68.8 on May 1)	
July 1	San Diego, California	XHAS-TDT	33.1	Telemundo	Azteca América	
August 1	Lafayette, Indiana	WLFI-DT2	18.2	GetTV	The CW	
August 23	Huntsville, Alabama	WAAY-TV	31.2	WeatherNation TV	Ion Television	
August 31	Lake Charles, Louisiana	KPLC-DT2	7.2	Grit (Grit moved to digital channel 7.4)	The CW	
August 31	Lake Charles, Louisiana	KVHP-DT2	29.2	The CW	ABC	
September 6	Terre Haute, Indiana	WTHI-DT3	10.3	Ion Television	The CW	
October 1	Silver Spring, Maryland (Washington, D.C.)	WJAL	68.1	English-language independent	LATV	(Note: On April 4, 2017, Entravision announced that it had sold WJAL's broadcast bandwidth in the incentive auction for $25.4 million (Steve Ullom, executive vice president of the station, stated that the spectrum sale price totaled $26.7 million); in the FCC filing on the sale, Entravision indicated that WJAL would enter into a post-auction channel sharing agreement; it later announced on July 28, that WJAL would enter into a channel-sharing agreement with CBS affiliate WUSA (channel 9), moving its transmitter facilities to that station's transmission tower in the Tenleytown section of northwest Washington and transfer its city of license to Silver Spring, Maryland. WJAL temporarily ceased operations at midnight on September 30, 2017, and resumed operations from the Tenleytown tower on October 1 as an interim affiliate of LATV until a future affiliation is announced (Entravision had been agitating for years to move WJAL to the capital's core to replace low-power WMDO-CD as an affiliate of UniMás).)
October 2	Providence, Rhode Island	WPRI-DT2	12.2	Bounce TV	MyNetworkTV	
October 2	Providence, Rhode Island	WPRI-DT3	12.3	GetTV	Bounce TV	
October 2	Providence, Rhode Island	WLWC	28.1	The CW	Ion Life	
October 2	Providence, Rhode Island	WNAC-DT2	64.2	MyNetworkTV	The CW	
November 1	Oklahoma City, Oklahoma	KOKH-DT3	25.2	WeatherNation TV	Stadium	
November 1	Oklahoma City, Oklahoma	KBZC-LD1	42.1	Stadium	Heartland	
November 4	Fairbanks, Alaska	KATN-DT2	2.2	The CW (relocated to KATN-DT3)	Fox	
November 4	Fairbanks, Alaska	KFXF-LD	22.1	Fox	MyNetworkTV	
December 17	Chicago, Illinois	WLS-DT3	7.3	Laff (migrated to WGBO-DT2)	temporarily vacant	
December 17	Chicago, Illinois	WGBO-DT2	60.2	getTV	Laff (migrated from WLS-DT3)	
December 17	Chicago, Illinois	WGBO-DT3	60.3	Grit	getTV	

=== Station spectrum transitions ===
Former station	Channel sharing partner/ new station	Channel number	Channel number retained	Affiliation	Market	Date	Notes	Source
KSPR/KGHZ	KSPR-LD	33.1	check	ABC	Springfield, Missouri	February 1	KSPR's full-power spectrum was sold in the spectrum auction, with KSPR's owner Schurz Communications transferring its ABC affiliation to Gray Television as it withdrew from broadcasting and to what was Gray's KYCW-LD, Springfield's CW affiliate four months in advance, which was re-called as KSPR-LD and assumed the ABC affiliation and channel 33 virtual channel (The CW moved to KSPR-LD2). KSPR was re-called as KGHZ in reference to the spectrum auction, and remained on the air with an Antenna TV affiliation also carried by KSPR-LD3 until the license was returned to the FCC by Schurz on May 31; the former KSPR transmitter was repurposed for Branson-licensed low-power station KYCW-LD, which carries The CW, Cozi TV and WeatherNation over three subchannels.	
WAGT	WAGT-CD	26.1	check	NBC	Augusta, Georgia	May 31	WAGT's full-power license was sold in the spectrum auction for $40.7 million by owner Gray Television. WAGT-CD would have assumed WAGT's virtual channel number and subchannels a year earlier if not for ownership complications involving Schurz's sale of WAGT and an existing joint sales and shared services agreements with Media General at the time, which required sorting out. WAGT-CD departed from their long-time affiliation with the lower-tier Youtoo America network.	
WIFR	WIFR-LD	23.1	check	CBS	Freeport/Rockford, Illinois	May 31	WIFR's full-power license was sold in the spectrum auction for slightly over $50 million. Gray acquired the low-power license W22EE-D from DTV America in 2016 (which had never gone on the air), and used that license to transfer over WIFR's CBS affiliation, virtual channel number, and subchannels to maintain its existing operations (including existing transmitter) at a lower power, which claims service of 95% of the market over-the-air, while turning the full-power WIFR license into the FCC.	
WBIN	WUNI (spectrum channel share)	50.1	Question	Independent; Antenna TV	Derry-Manchester, New Hampshire/Boston, Massachusetts	September 15	WBIN owner Carlisle One Media announced on February 17 its intent to exit the television business by divesting the channel 50 license as part of the spectrum auction and announcing plans to sell translators to other broadcasters. In addition, WBIN immediately shut down its in-house news department, which was part of the Binnie-owned NH1 News division, which will retain a radio and digital presence. This marks the second time that the channel 50 license in the Boston market has been returned to the FCC (after WXPO-TV), with the sale leaving Manchester-based ABC affiliate WMUR-TV as the only full-power English language television station licensed to New Hampshire. On May 4, 2017, Binnie Media filed an application for WBIN-TV to enter into a channel sharing agreement with UniMás owned-and-operated station WUTF-DT (channel 66), in which Univision Communications would be granted the option of acquiring the WBIN license. Univision exercised that option on May 8, purchasing the channel 50 license for $16.76 million; it subsequently affiliated WBIN with Justice Network (Univision is carried in Boston through Entravision-owned affiliate WUNI (channel 27); in December 2017, WUNI moved to the Univision-owned channel 66 license and inherited the channel sharing agreement with WBIN).	
WUSF-TV	WEDQ	16.1	(one subchannel)	PBS	Tampa/ St. Petersburg/ Clearwater, Florida	October 16	The University of South Florida announced on February 9 that it will sell WUSF-TV's broadcast spectrum as part of the FCC's spectrum auction for $18.8 million. The station was set to cease operations on October 15, with primary member station WEDU becoming the sole provider of PBS programming in the Tampa–St. Petersburg market. However, on October 8, WEDU owner Florida West Coast Public Broadcasting announced that it will enter into a channel sharing agreement with and acquire the license of WUSF-TV, with the intent of relaunching the station as an extension service offering PBS and other educational programming as well as certain programs that were carried by WUSF. Florida West Coast assumed operational responsibilities for WEDQ on October 16, running The Florida Channel on its remaining DT4 subchannel during the transition period (WEDU concurrently assumed WUSF's membership rights to the PBS Kids Channel and Create, migrating both networks onto WEDU's allocated spectrum).	
WYCC	WTTW	20.1	Question	PBS	Chicago, Illinois	November 27	The City Colleges of Chicago announced on April 4 that WYCC's broadcast spectrum was sold as part of the FCC's spectrum auction for $15 million. The existing WYCC schedule was dumped on October 25 and replaced with MHz Worldview (which had been carried on the station's DT3 subchannel); it remained with that network until WYCC ended its operations on November 27, a date settled for its shutdown after being changed multiple times, presumably to allow time to work out a channel sharing deal with the primary PBS member station in the area, WTTW, and its owner Window to the World Communications (which never came to fruition). On December 7, Window to the World Communications announced that it will purchase WYCC, a move that will put the two stations under one corporate umbrella.	

=== Station closures ===
Station	Channel	Affiliation	Market	Date	Notes	Source
WHTV	18.#	MyNetworkTV	Jackson/Lansing, Michigan	August 31	WHTV was sold in the broadcast spectrum incentive auction by owner Venture Technologies Group. The existing schedule and JSA with E.W. Scripps Company-owned Fox affiliate WSYM-TV was dumped on May 1 to carry the former DT2 affiliation of Jewelry Television until it ended operations on August 31, a date that changed multiple times. MyNetworkTV programming returned to the Lansing-Jackson market on October 9, 2017, when WSYM launched a fourth digital subchannel affiliated with the programming service, which also carries some syndicated programs formerly carried by WHTV prior to its disaffiliation from the service.	
WFXI	8.#	Fox	Morehead City/ Greenville, North Carolina	September 6	Bonten Media Group announced on April 4, 2017, that the broadcast spectrum of WFXI was sold as part of the FCC's spectrum auction for $42 million. This came just prior to Sinclair Broadcast Group's announcement of its acquisition of WCTI-TV and WFXI/WYDO owner Bonten Media. After the closure, its satellite station WYDO became the sole Fox affiliate for the Greenville market.	
WBKI	34.#	The CW	Campbellsville/Louisville, Kentucky	October 25	On April 13, LM Communications sold the station's UHF spectrum for WBKI for over $20.65 million in the FCC's 2016 spectrum auction. WBKI's digital subchannels were completely merged into those of WMYO/Salem, Indiana, and the principal transmitter in Raywick was shut down.	
WPBO	42.#	PBS	Portsmouth, Ohio/Huntington/ Charleston, West Virginia	October 25	WPBO, a satellite station of Columbus-based WOSU-TV, was sold in the spectrum auction by owner Ohio State University, which cited an "incredible duplication of PBS signals" in WPBO's broadcast area (far southern Ohio, western West Virginia, and northeastern Kentucky). Proceeds from the $8.8 million sale of WPBO will remain with WOSU-TV, which will continue operations.	
WCDC	19.#	ABC	Adams/Pittsfield, Massachusetts	November 19	WCDC, a satellite station of Albany, New York ABC affiliate WTEN serving The Berkshires and Pittsfield from Mount Greylock, was sold in the spectrum auction by owner Nexstar Media Group. Nexstar had initially intended to keep WCDC on the air through a channel sharing agreement, but later announced that WCDC would instead shut down completely on December 1. Due to damage to the station's transmission line, WCDC ended operations two weeks earlier than scheduled on November 19. Nexstar also sold the WCDC tower to Albany-licensed public radio station WAMC on December 22, assuring that station's survival by retaining its wide coverage area across the Capital Region and Berkshires from the WCDC tower.	
KQED Life	54.3	PBS	San Jose, California	December 15	KQED Inc. announced on November 14 that KQED Life would go off the air and its lifestyle programs would be moved to KQED Plus and KQED 9.	
KCCO	7.#	CBS	Alexandria, Minnesota	December 30	CBS sold KCCO's spectrum in the FCC's spectrum incentive auction, but was expected to engage in a channel-sharing agreement. In a request for a waiver of requirements that KCCO broadcast public service announcements related to the shutdown, CBS disclosed that KCCO would shut down December 30, 2017. WCCO-TV will remain available on cable and satellite providers in the Alexandria area; CBS also signed a contract with Selective TV, Inc., a local translator collective, to carry WCCO programming.	
