= WFUT-DT =

Television station in Newark, New Jersey

- Newark, New Jersey; New York, New York; United States
- City: Newark, New Jersey
- Channels: Digital: 26 (UHF), shared with WXTV-DT; Virtual: 68
- Branding: UniMás Nueva York

Programming
- Affiliations: 68.1: UniMás; 68.2: True Crime Network; 68.3: Great

Ownership
- Owner: TelevisaUnivision; (Univision New York LLC)
- Sister stations: WFTY-DT; WXTV-DT; WADO; WXNY-FM

History
- First air date: September 29, 1974
- Former call signs: WBTB-TV (1974–1977); WTVG (1977–1979); WWHT (1979–1987); WHSE-TV (1987–2001); WFUT (2001–2003); WFUT-TV (2004–2009)
- Former channel numbers: Analog: 68 (UHF, 1974–2009); Digital: 53 (UHF, 1999–2009), 30 (UHF, 2009–2019)
- Former affiliations: Independent (1974–1986); Wometco Home Theater (1977–1985); FNN (1981–1983); HSN (1986–2001); AIN (2001–2002)
- Call sign meaning: Telefutura (former name for UniMás)

Technical information
- Licensing authority: FCC
- Facility ID: 60555
- ERP: 215 kW
- HAAT: 397 m (1,302 ft)
- Transmitter coordinates: 40°44′54″N 73°59′9″W

Links
- Public license information: Public file; LMS
- Website: www.univision.com/unimas

WFUT-DT (channel 68) is a television station licensed to Newark, New Jersey, United States, serving as the UniMás outlet for the New York City area. It is owned and operated by TelevisaUnivision. Under common ownership with Paterson, New Jersey–licensed Univision station WXTV-DT (channel 41), both stations share studio facilities on Frank W. Burr Boulevard in Teaneck, New Jersey, and transmitter facilities at the Empire State Building in Midtown Manhattan. The programming of both stations and True Crime Network is simulcast to Long Island and southern Connecticut via WFTY-DT (channel 67), broadcasting from Middle Island, New York.

Channel 68 was originally awarded to Walter Reade in 1970 as part of what had initially been an attempt to revive WRTV, a dead UHF station of the mid-1950s broadcasting from Asbury Park. The station was sold to Blonder-Tongue Laboratories and began broadcasting as WBTB-TV on September 29, 1974. It offered a limited amount of New Jersey–specific programming but ran out of money after 90 days. The station returned on September 28, 1975, this time as a specialist outlet offering financial, foreign-language, and children's programs. The station was the first broadcast outlet for The Uncle Floyd Show, a local children's program that gained a cult following in the New York metropolitan area.

After conglomerate Wometco Enterprises reached a deal to become channel 68's majority owner, on March 1, 1977, WBTB-TV became the first station in the U.S. at that time to broadcast subscription television (STV) programming to paying users. When Wometco closed on the transaction, the station changed its call sign to WTVG and then WWHT, and the subscription service took the name Wometco Home Theater (WHT). WHT provided first-run movies and New York sports programming to households in areas unserved by cable. Its reach was expanded in 1980 when WHT began appearing on channel 67, then WSNL-TV; Wometco acquired that station outright in 1981. At its peak, WHT served more than 111,000 subscribers and was the fourth-largest STV system in the nation.

The death of Wometco majority owner Mitchell Wolfson in 1983 triggered a leveraged buyout by Kohlberg Kravis Roberts (KKR). As subscriptions declined due to rising cable penetration, Wometco sold off the WHT business but kept channels 68 and 67, which began broadcasting a music video service known as U68 on June 1, 1985. U68 was a locally programmed competitor to MTV with a more eclectic mix of music. The stations were put on the market in December 1985 because KKR executed a second leveraged buyout, this time of Storer Communications, and chose to retain Storer's cable systems in northern New Jersey and Connecticut over WWHT and WSNL-TV. The two stations were sold to the Home Shopping Network (HSN) as part of its foray into broadcasting; renamed WHSE and WHSI, they broadcast home shopping programming for the next 15 years. While an attempt by company owner Barry Diller to convert the stations to general-entertainment independents was slated as late as 2000, Diller ultimately sold WHSE and WHSI and other USA Broadcasting stations to Univision in 2001. Many of these stations formed the backbone of Telefutura (now UniMás), which launched in January 2002, at which time WHSE and WHSI became WFUT and WFTY.

== Early years ==
=== Prehistory ===
In August 1966, two groups applied for channel 68 in Newark, New Jersey, which they hoped to telecast from the Empire State Building in New York City. One application came from Clifton S. Green, a businessman from Brooklyn, while the other came from Atlantic Video Corporation, owned by the Walter Reade Sterling chain of movie theaters. Their proposals to use the Empire State Building were contested by WPIX and the Association of Maximum Service Telecasters as being too close to the allotment of channel 67 to Patchogue, New York, and circumventing the need to serve Newark, not New York. The Reade application was unique in that it was initially filed as the modification of a construction permit for Reade's long-dead WRTV (channel 58) in Asbury Park; WPIX also contended that the relocated channel 68 facility would not serve Monmouth or Ocean counties in New Jersey. The next year, Walter Reade amended its application to specify a tower in West Orange, New Jersey, instead of the Empire State Building. In 1969, the commission deleted WRTV and its call letters, proceeding to consider the Newark modification as a request for a construction permit.

Reade was awarded the channel 68 construction permit in March 1970. The Reade organization promised that the new station, which it intended to retake the WRTV call sign, would be a commercial, general-market UHF station, the first such station not to primarily program for ethnic communities in the New York metropolitan area. The WRTV call letters never made it to Newark. McGraw-Hill applied for them to be used to rename WFBM-TV in Indianapolis, which it was acquiring from Time-Life, in 1971; the new designation began use in Indianapolis on June 2, 1972.

=== WBTB-TV: Blonder-Tongue ownership ===
In 1972, Atlantic Video agreed to sell the channel 68 construction permit, designated WWRO, to the Blonder-Tongue Broadcasting Corporation, a division of Old Bridge Township, New Jersey–based Blonder-Tongue Laboratories. Blonder-Tongue's ambition for channel 68 was to use it as the first station to test its recently approved BTVision subscription television (STV) technology, which would beam otherwise scrambled pictures into the homes of paying subscribers with decoders. Isaac Blonder, a Blonder-Tongue executive, cited the potential for STV to acquire the rights to first-run movies and entertainment programs previously unavailable over conventional, ad-supported television, and he believed his service would eventually have more than 500,000 subscribers in the New York metropolitan area. Blonder-Tongue obtained FCC approval to acquire channel 68 in August, leaving it the task to build the station, which was given a new call sign of WBTB-TV. Immediate development of the station was halted because of a faltering stock market.

Blonder-Tongue applied in 1973 for approval to build a 400-foot (120 m) tower for the station in the Eagle Rock Reservation in West Orange. The station struggled to convince Essex County officials, who had previously advocated against the use of park land for towers; West Orange officials, who had recently passed more stringent ordinances; and the public. This greatly frustrated Blonder, who told The Home News, "Down with environmentalists! ... All they know is the unintelligent use of nature. Ban anything new, that's all they care about." The tower was constructed, but the West Orange Town Council sued its owner for creating "visual pollution", a case soon settled.

We could understand the reluctance of national accounts to advertise on a brand new New Jersey station, but what surprised us most was the hostile response our salesmen received at the hands of our own New Jersey major industries.

— Isaac Blonder, on the lack of advertising that forced WBTB-TV off the air after three months

WBTB-TV began broadcasting on September 29, 1974. The station would initially operate in evening hours with free, ad-supported programming and initiate subscription service at a later date, though it would also test the BTVision system outside of regular programming. The first studios were a converted two-story house in West Orange; the living room became a studio, the control room occupied the former kitchen, and upstairs bedrooms were turned into offices. The initial lineup included children's programming, a half-hour New Jersey newscast and nightly public affairs program, and old Hopalong Cassidy films and other classic shows. The station had a local children's show, The Uncle Floyd Show, on Saturdays; this weekly, live program grew out of a public-access cable series in Pompton Lakes. The station left the air on December 27, telling the FCC that it needed to resolve technical and financial difficulties before returning to the air. In March 1975, Blonder testified at a New Jersey State Senate committee hearing about the state's lack of TV news coverage that channel 68 ceased broadcasting because it lacked advertisers and because local businesses were actively against supporting the new television station.

Nine months after leaving the air, WBTB-TV returned on September 28, 1975. This time, it adopted a format dominated by specialty programs. During the day, the station offered daytime financial news coverage, which was produced by Eugene Inger. Inger provided financial support in exchange for shares in Blonder-Tongue Broadcasting and hosted the financial report. At night, it offered shows in a variety of foreign languages, the Christian show The PTL Club, and shows on New York entertainment and the Grand Ole Opry. The Uncle Floyd Show returned to WBTB-TV, this time as a live half-hour aired twice a week.

== Wometco ownership ==
=== Launch of Wometco Home Theater ===
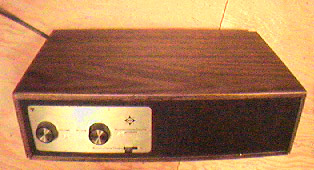
A Wometco Home Theater decoder box, built by Blonder-Tongue Labs

In April 1976, Wometco Enterprises, a Florida-based media conglomerate that owned television stations in Florida, North Carolina, and Washington state, as well as movie theaters and cable systems in New Jersey and elsewhere, agreed to buy 80 percent of WBTB in exchange for paying $1.5 million of its debts. Wometco would proceed with the development of subscription television on channel 68 using Blonder-Tongue equipment. Wometco planned to program the station's ad-supported broadcast day with shows for children. With Wometco's backing, WBTB-TV sent out its first subscription television programs using the BTVision system on March 1, 1977. Some 200 families in South Orange served as the pilot market for the subscription service, which initially broadcast two movies a night for $12.95 a month. The films had ceased running in theaters but had yet to premiere on network television.

The FCC granted Wometco approval to acquire the majority stake in July 1977; however, it gave the company two years to sell off the New Jersey cable systems, as at the time cross-ownership of broadcast stations and cable systems in the same areas was not permitted. (Note: Wometco asked for a further waiver and was denied this in 1979. It opted to sell the cable systems to Storer Broadcasting and keep channel 68.) At the time Wometco took over operations of WBTB and the BTVision service, technical issues at channel 68 had kept the service from expanding beyond South Orange; it only had 500 subscribers. The new owners appointed the assistant general manager of WTVJ, Wometco's television station in Miami, to run the operation. The station changed its call sign to WTVG on July 29, 1977. BTVision then changed its name to Wometco Home Theater (WHT).

Over the next several years, Wometco expanded the availability of WHT, community by community, focusing on areas not already served by cable systems. Wometco launched a promotional push for its service in 1978. That year, the station built a translator on channel 60 atop the World Trade Center, rebroadcasting its signal in New York City, and it added 800 subscribers a week. By March 1979, it had nearly 40,000 subscribers, primarily in parts of New Jersey and the New York City boroughs of Brooklyn, Queens, and Staten Island. In addition to adding a matinee movie, it bolstered the programming offering in 1979 by adding sports broadcasts from SportsChannel New York, a regional cable service: this brought the New York Mets, New York Yankees, New York Islanders, and New Jersey Nets to WHT. By this time, the monthly service charge had increased to $17. WHT's subscriber base had grown to 72,000 by year's end.

Beyond WHT, Channel 68 continued its ad-supported broadcasting. The station produced regular programs on senior citizens and the Black community, as well as a 15-minute New Jersey news roundup; it tried its hand at all-night programming after WHT concluded with the short-lived The All-Night Show. The largest attraction continued to be children's shows. Ken Taishoff, who took over as general manager in 1979, claimed that children were more likely to watch a UHF station than their parents were. In an early 1979 survey by Arbitron, WTVG garnered its first rating point in the late afternoons when it aired the shows. The Uncle Floyd Show began to attract a cult following. The station had grown enough to merit the addition of a trailer next to the studio house to accommodate more offices.

To identify itself with the WHT service, WTVG changed its call sign to WWHT on July 16, 1979.

=== Channel 68 adds 67 ===
Long Island's only commercial TV station, WSNL-TV (channel 67), returned to the air in December 1979 after a silence lasting more than four years. The station had been built in 1973 as a full-time commercial independent station for Long Island but was a financial failure. It returned to the air after CanWest Capital Group paid off all of its debts in exchange for the rights to broadcast STV programming from WSNL-TV.

Concerned that a service reaching just Long Island might not be viable, CanWest approached Wometco. In January 1980, the two companies formed a joint venture to bring Wometco Home Theater to Long Island over channel 67. The station began airing Wometco Home Theater that June after returning to the air from a fire.

The FCC approved of Wometco acquiring WSNL-TV in November 1980. Because channels 67 and 68 had overlapping signals, Wometco would operate WSNL-TV as a simulcast of WWHT with up to 4 1/2 hours a week of its own programming. Wometco closed on the purchase in January 1981, and in June, it bought out CanWest's interest in the joint venture and became the sole owner of WSNL while sharing ownership of WWHT with Blonder-Tongue. Earlier that year, the largest possible competitive threat to Wometco Home Theater, a proposed ON TV system on WNJU-TV (channel 47), dissipated when the owner, Chartwell Communications, opted against competing with WHT.

On November 30, 1981, WWHT–WSNL began airing daytime programming from the new Financial News Network (FNN) between 10 a.m. and 5 p.m. With the extended reach of WHT, the service boasted 111,200 subscribers in June 1982, making it the fourth-largest STV operation in the country behind the ON TV operations in Los Angeles and Chicago and the SelecTV operation in Los Angeles. This year was the peak for subscription operation as the early 1980s recession deepened and cable systems continued building out in areas served by STV. In addition, beginning in 1981, Wometco Home Theater was seen on WRBV-TV (channel 65) in southern New Jersey and the Philadelphia area, where at one point it claimed to have more than 20,000 subscribers before closing in November 1984.

WWHT and WSNL began broadcasting WHT programming 20 hours a day on March 1, 1983, and discontinued all ad-supported telecasting, including FNN and Uncle Floyd. They were able to do so because the FCC had abolished the so-called "28-hour rule"—which required stations to provide a minimum of, on average, four hours a day of non-subscription programming—in June 1982. The Uncle Floyd Show returned to television on the New Jersey Network later in 1983.

=== KKR buyout of Wometco ===
Mitchell Wolfson, the founder of Wometco, died of a heart attack on January 28, 1983. He left the company with no clear succession plan, and no one was designated as a succeeding chairman. In fact, Wolfson was the largest stockholder in Wometco at the time of his death.

After approving several measures in a shareholders meeting designed to prevent a hostile takeover, the Wolfson family and Wometco board sold the company to merchant banker Kohlberg Kravis Roberts & Co. (KKR) on September 21, 1983, in a $1 billion leveraged buyout, the largest in history at the time. While Wometco still existed after the buyout was completed on April 13, 1984, the company was taken private and split into two entities: one based around the television station licenses and Wometco Home Theater and the other centered around the theater chain, Miami Seaquarium, bottling, and cable divisions.

With rapidly advancing cable and declining subscriptions, KKR began the process of ending the subscription television era of WWHT and WSNL. On November 1, 1984, Wometco ceased programming the service and instead began passing through movies from SelecTV; at that time, it still counted some 80,000 subscribers. It sold the WHT service to Pay TV of Greater New York. That company renamed itself Cooper Wireless Cable and began broadcasting from the channel 60 translator, though in doing so it lost subscribers who could not receive the low-power signal from the World Trade Center. Though the stations continued to run WHT in the interim, KKR contemplated reformatting WWHT–WSNL as general-entertainment independents with syndicated reruns.

In April 1985, KKR executed another leveraged buyout, this one of Storer Communications, then facing a shareholder revolt and a hostile takeover attempt by Comcast. The deal was completed in December 1985; however, approval by the FCC was contingent on KKR divesting either Storer's cable systems in northern New Jersey and Connecticut, serving 195,000 subscribers, or WWHT–WSNL within 18 months to satisfy cross-ownership rules. While Storer and Wometco remained nominally separate companies, the FCC recognized KKR as the primary owner of both and forced it to make a number of station or system divestitures. Storer already had announced it would keep the cable systems over WWHT and WSNL.

== U68 ==
With the end of WHT programming, channels 68 and 67 switched to a music video format known as U68 on June 1, 1985. The new format came together in just ten days and originally broadcast for twelve hours a day. In the morning hours, WWHT and WSNL continued to offer non-video religious and community affairs shows.

U68 touted its format as specifically programmed for the New York market in contrast to the national cable service of MTV; it carved out time to air videos by local acts. It offered R&B, pop, and heavy metal music in dayparts, as well as music news breaks–which Uncle Floyd returned to channel 68 to co-host. It had a broader format than MTV with more urban contemporary and metal music; program director Steve Leeds called it "all over the place musically". As a music video station and not merely a program, it was subject to the six-month exclusivity that MTV demanded from some record labels for new titles. At the end of 1985, it extended to begin late-night broadcasting to 1 or 2 a.m. six nights a week. The service also produced a music video, for "Put That Head Out" by rap artist Funkmaster Wizard Wiz.

== Home shopping and Telefutura/UniMás ==
On August 4, 1986, the Home Shopping Network (HSN) announced that it would enter the broadcast television business by buying three stations in two acquisitions: WWHT and WSNL-TV, as well as the Boston area's WVJV "V-66", a station with a similar format to U68. The three stations went for $46 million. The stations would carry the newly established Home Shopping Network 2 service, which offered a more upscale assortment of products than the existing HSN. News that U68 was likely on its way out to make way for home shopping programming led Pablo Guzmán in the New York Daily News to praise the "quality service" that it provided to homes without cable in spite of MTV's restrictions and other challenges and his colleague Jim Farber to laud its "innovative, genre-busting programming and no creepy veejays". On October 6, 1986, HSN closed on the WWHT–WSNL deal and began programming both stations with home shopping. Five production employees lost their jobs with the transition to home shopping. HSN also changed the stations' call letters from WWHT and WSNL to WHSE and WHSI, respectively, effective January 23, 1987.

The purchase of the New York and Boston stations started a shopping spree for HSN. By January 1987, it had acquired stations serving Baltimore and Washington, D.C., Chicago, Cleveland, Houston, Los Angeles, and Philadelphia. It later added stations in the Dallas–Fort Worth, Miami, and Tampa Bay markets, giving it 12 stations and making it the fifth-largest station owner by reach in the country as of 1992, behind the Big Three networks and Tribune Broadcasting. That year, HSN spun off the twelve stations into a new company, Silver King Broadcasting.

A joint venture led by Barry Diller bought the Silver King stations in 1996, renaming the group USA Broadcasting. As late as 2000, the company promised to bring the CityVision general-entertainment independent format that USA Broadcasting was slowly rolling out in its portfolio to New York and Los Angeles. CityVision had made it to four cities, but it proved costly to operate and was a ratings disappointment outside of live sports. USA Station Group Partnership of New Jersey, the licensee of WHSE, registered a trademark on WORX as a future call sign in October 2000. After discussions for a joint venture with ABC fell apart, the USA Broadcasting stations were sold to Univision for $1.1 billion in a deal announced in December 2000. The USA–Univision deal created seven new duopolies, including the pairing of WHSE and WHSI with Univision's WXTV (channel 41).

In the immediate aftermath of the September 11 attacks of 2001, channel 68 temporarily simulcast WABC-TV, which had been broadcasting from the World Trade Center. It was later joined by channel 67. The station ceased broadcasting HSN on October 1, 2001, and temporarily switched to the American Independent Network.

Univision used most of the stations it acquired from USA Broadcasting to launch a second network, Telefutura, which debuted on January 14, 2002. The stations adopted new WFUT and WFTY call letters, respectively. Telefutura rebranded as UniMás in 2013.

In 2008, Univision experimented with adding 7 a.m. local morning newscasts to four of its Telefutura stations, including WFUT–WFTY. This continued through at least 2014.

== Technical information ==
=== Subchannels ===
WFUT-DT and WXTV-DT broadcast from the Empire State Building.

Subchannels of WFUT-DT and WXTV-DT
License	Subchannel	Res.	Short name	Programming
WFUT-DT	68.1	720p	WFUT-DT	UniMás
WFUT-DT	68.2	480i	CRIME	True Crime Network (WFTY-DT)
WFUT-DT	68.3	480i	GetTV	Great (4:3)
WXTV-DT	41.1	720p	WXTV-DT	Univision
WXTV-DT	41.2	480i	MSGold	MovieSphere Gold
WXTV-DT	41.3	480i	BT2	Infomercials
WXTV-DT	11.2	480i	Antenna	Antenna TV (WPIX)
WXTV-DT	11.4	480i	REWIND	Rewind TV (WPIX)

Simulcast of subchannels of another station
Broadcast on behalf of another station

Subchannel broadcast with MPEG-4 video

Coverage areas of WFUT–WXTV (red) and WFTY-DT (blue). WFUT–WXTV, from the Empire State Building, serves New York City, the Hudson Valley, and northern New Jersey. WFTY-DT, from Middle Island, serves much of the southern Connecticut coast and eastern Long Island. The signals overlap over southwestern Connecticut and west-central Long Island.

=== Analog-to-digital conversion ===
WFUT ended regular programming on its analog signal, over UHF channel 68, on June 12, 2009, as part of the federally mandated transition from analog to digital television. The station relocated its digital signal to channel 30, using virtual channel 68.

In the incentive auction, WXTV's spectrum was sold for $198,965,211, and the station's license was consolidated onto one channel with co-owned WFUT. WFUT–WXTV relocated its signal from channel 30 to channel 26 on August 1, 2019, as a result of the 2016 United States wireless spectrum auction.

== See also ==
- All Channels Act
- WFTY-DT
