= List of television stations in New Jersey =

This is a list of broadcast television stations licensed to, or located in cities in the U.S. state of New Jersey.

== Full-power ==
- Stations are arranged by media market served and channel position.

Full-power television stations in New Jersey
Media market	Station	Channel	Primary affiliation(s)	Notes	Refs
~New York City, NY	WWOR-TV	9	MyNetworkTV, Fox on 9.2	(Note: Licensed to Secaucus, New Jersey.)	
~New York City, NY	WNET	13	PBS	(Note: Licensed to Newark, New Jersey.)	
~New York City, NY	WJLP	33	MeTV	(Note: Licensed to Middletown Township, New Jersey.)	
~New York City, NY	WXTV-DT	41	Univision	(Note: Licensed to Paterson, New Jersey.)	
~New York City, NY	WNJU	47	Telemundo, TeleXitos on 47.2	(Note: Licensed to Linden, New Jersey.)	
~New York City, NY	WNJN	50	PBS (NJ PBS)	(Note: Licensed to Montclair, New Jersey.) (Note: Satellite of WNJT.)	
~New York City, NY	WNJB	58	PBS (NJ PBS)	(Note: Licensed to New Brunswick, New Jersey.)	
~New York City, NY	WMBC-TV	63	Estrella TV	(Note: Licensed to Newton, New Jersey.)	
~New York City, NY	WFUT-DT	68	UniMás		
~Philadelphia, PA	WACP	4	TCT	(Note: Licensed to Atlantic City, New Jersey.)	
~Philadelphia, PA	WNJS	23	PBS (NJ PBS)	(Note: Licensed to Camden, New Jersey.)	
~Philadelphia, PA	WMGM-TV	40	True Crime Network, Univision on 40.3	(Note: Licensed to Wildwood, New Jersey.)	
~Philadelphia, PA	WMCN-TV	44	ShopLC	(Note: Licensed to Princeton, New Jersey.)	
~Philadelphia, PA	WGTW-TV	48	TBN	(Note: Licensed to Millville, New Jersey.)	
~Philadelphia, PA	WNJT	52	PBS (NJ PBS)	(Note: Licensed to Trenton, New Jersey.)	
~Philadelphia, PA	WWSI	62	Telemundo, TeleXitos on 62.2		
~Philadelphia, PA	WUVP-DT	65	Univision	(Note: Licensed to Vineland, New Jersey.)	

== Low-power ==
Low-power television stations in New Jersey
Media market	Station	Channel	Primary affiliation(s)	Notes	Refs
~New York City, NY	W20FF-D	15	Independent	(Note: Licensed to Teaneck, New Jersey.)	
~New York City, NY	WDVB-CD	23	TBN Inspire	(Note: Licensed to Edison, New Jersey.)	
~New York City, NY	WNYX-LD	34	Various	(Note: Licensed to East Orange, New Jersey.)	
~Philadelphia, PA	WPSJ-CD	8	Various	(Note: Licensed to Hammonton, New Jersey.)	
~Philadelphia, PA	WSJT-LD	15	Various		
~Philadelphia, PA	W24ET-D	24	[Blank]		
~Philadelphia, PA	W29FF-D	45	Daystar		

== Translators ==
Television station translators in New Jersey
Media market	Station	Channel	Translating	Notes	Refs
~New York City, NY	W23EX-D	58	WNJB	(Note: Licensed to Sussex, New Jersey.)	
~New York City, NY	W29EV-D	58	WNJB	(Note: Licensed to Hackettstown, New Jersey.)	
~Philadelphia, PA	W27EC-D	58	WNJB	(Note: Licensed to Belvidere, New Jersey.)	

== Defunct ==
- WFPG-TV Atlantic City (1952–1954)
- WKBS-TV Burlington (1965–1983)
- WNYJ-TV West Milford (1996–2017)
- WNTA-TV Newark (1948–1961)
- WRTV Asbury Park (1953–1955)
