= WSJT =

WSJT may refer to:

- WSJT-LD, a low-power television station (channel 10, virtual 15) licensed to serve Atlantic City, New Jersey, United States
- the previous callsign of radio station WKVZ
- a former callsign of television station WUVP-DT
- WSJT (amateur radio software), a computer program used for weak-signal radio communication between amateur radio operators
