= WFTY-DT =

Television station in Smithtown, New York

- Smithtown, New York; United States
- Channels: Digital: 23 (UHF); Virtual: 67

Programming
- Affiliations: 67.1: True Crime Network; 67.2: UniMás; 67.3: Univision; for others, see § Subchannels

Ownership
- Owner: TelevisaUnivision; (Univision New York LLC)
- Sister stations: WFUT-DT; WXTV-DT; WADO; WXNY-FM

History
- First air date: November 18, 1973
- Former call signs: WSNL-TV (1973–1987); WHSI (1987–1998); WHSI-TV (1998–2002); WFTY (2002–2003); WFTY-TV (2004–2009)
- Former channel numbers: Analog: 67 (UHF, 1973–2009)
- Former affiliations: Independent (1973–1975; 1979–1986); Dark (1975–1979); Wometco Home Theater (1980–1985); HSN (1986–2001); AIN (2001–2002); Telefutura/UniMás (2002–2017; now on 67.2)
- Call sign meaning: Telefutura New York (former name for UniMás)

Technical information
- Licensing authority: FCC
- Facility ID: 60553
- ERP: 655 kW
- HAAT: 219 m (719 ft)
- Transmitter coordinates: 40°53′23″N 72°57′11″W

Links
- Public license information: Public file; LMS

WFTY-DT (channel 67) is a television station licensed to Smithtown, New York, United States, serving Long Island and owned by TelevisaUnivision. Its main channel broadcasts the True Crime Network; it also rebroadcasts the main channels of its New York City–area Univision and UniMás stations, WXTV-DT (channel 41) and WFUT-DT (channel 68), from its transmitter in Middle Island, New York.

Channel 67 was originally assigned to Patchogue, New York, where television producer Theodore Granik obtained the construction permit for a new TV station in September 1968. Granik envisioned a group of ultra high frequency (UHF) stations carrying public affairs programming, but he died in 1970 with channel 67 unbuilt. The permit was acquired by the Suburban Broadcasting Corporation, which believed it could fill a void in providing news, sports, and entertainment programming from and for Long Island. On this basis, WSNL-TV began broadcasting on November 18, 1973. As much as 70 percent of its lineup consisted of live, local programming, ranging from local news and sports to children's and cooking shows and a Long Island–set soap opera. The station struggled to build a viewer and advertiser base owing to reception difficulties—lampooned so frequently by Newsday writer Marvin Kitman that he was sued—and economic troubles. It left the air on June 20, 1975, and filed for bankruptcy the next year.

In 1978, CanWest Capital Corporation, a Canadian company whose U.S. subsidiary Universal Subscription Television was in the subscription television (STV) business, paid off all of Suburban's debts in exchange for the rights to broadcast STV programming on channel 67. CanWest then entered into a joint venture with Wometco Enterprises, majority owner of channel 68 and operator of the Wometco Home Theater (WHT) STV service that served the New York City area and northern New Jersey. Beginning in June 1980, WSNL-TV began providing WHT on Long Island. Wometco terminated the joint venture in 1981 and became the sole owner of channel 67. At its peak, WHT served more than 111,000 subscribers and was the fourth-largest STV system in the nation.

The death of Wometco majority owner Mitchell Wolfson in 1983 triggered a leveraged buyout by Kohlberg Kravis Roberts (KKR). As subscriptions declined due to rising cable penetration, Wometco sold off the WHT business but kept channels 68 and 67, which began broadcasting a music video service known as U68 on June 1, 1985. U68 was a locally programmed competitor to MTV with a more eclectic mix of music. The stations were put on the market in December 1985 because KKR executed a second leveraged buyout, this time of Storer Communications, and chose to retain Storer's cable systems in northern New Jersey and Connecticut over WWHT and WSNL-TV. The two stations were sold to the Home Shopping Network (HSN) as part of its foray into broadcasting; renamed WHSE and WHSI, they broadcast home shopping programming for the next 15 years. While an attempt by company owner Barry Diller to convert the stations to general-entertainment independents was slated as late as 2000, Diller ultimately sold WHSE and WHSI and other USA Broadcasting stations to Univision in 2001. Many of these stations formed the backbone of Telefutura (now UniMás), which launched in January 2002, at which time WHSE and WHSI became WFUT and WFTY.

== WSNL-TV ==
=== Prehistory ===
On August 22, 1964, Theodore Granik applied for a construction permit for channel 75 in Patchogue, New York, with the channel assignment soon changed to 67 after the Federal Communications Commission (FCC) overhauled television allocations nationally. Granik, who had produced the long-running The American Forum of the Air on radio and television, envisioned the Patchogue channel as one of seven stations nationwide specializing in public affairs programming. Long Island Video also filed for channel 67; Medallion Pictures acquired the company and became the applicant, but it agreed to withdraw in exchange for the costs it had incurred in seeking channel 67, granting Granik the permit in September 1968.

Granik never built channel 67. He died on September 21, 1970. His death scuttled plans for channel 67 and channel 50 in Washington, D.C.; the estate left no money to start the Washington station, which declared bankruptcy. On March 19, 1971, Granik Broadcasting Corporation filed to sell the permit to the Suburban Broadcasting Corporation. Suburban was a consortium of New York–area investors, including some from Long Island as well as Percy Sutton, the president of Manhattan Borough.

After closing on the purchase of the permit from Granik's estate, Suburban unveiled its plans for channel 67, which was given the call sign WSNL-TV (for Suffolk County and Nassau County counties on Long Island). Suburban's principals believed Long Island was underserved by television, being part of the New York television market. In 1969, an educational station, WLIW, began broadcasting from Garden City, but there was no commercial outlet. Company president David H. Polinger noted the presence of two daily newspapers and 20 radio stations on Long Island but no locally focused TV station. Polinger brought Long Island broadcast experience, having built radio stations in Lake Success and Babylon.

Channel 67 planned a schedule heavy on live programs, with as much as 70 percent of the schedule being live, ranging from news and high school sports to a live soap opera. Films and syndicated programming rounded out the lineup. Construction of studios near the corner of the Long Island Expressway and Veterans Highway in Central Islip, near Hauppauge, began in April 1973. The 18,000 square feet (1,700 m^{2}) building featured two studios to handle the station's large local program output.

=== Live and local for Long Island ===
WSNL-TV began broadcasting to Long Island on November 18, 1973. It represented a $4 million investment by Suburban Broadcasting. Programming included The Fairchilds, a soap opera featuring a family that moved from California to Oyster Bay; the amateur variety show Toast of Long Island; a late-night variety show, Long Island Tonight; Chef Nicola, a live cooking show; Black Metamorphosis, a public affairs program; exercise program Trim and Slim; children's programs Captain Ahab and Ahab and Friends; and sports coverage and two daily editions of 67 Action News. Syndicated programs included The Phil Donahue Show.

The principal operating challenge for WSNL-TV was that it was an ultra high frequency (UHF) station. The quality of the station's local programming and many viewers' trouble tuning it in became regular fodder for Marvin Kitman, the television critic and satirist for Long Island's daily Newsday. Over the course of 1974, Kitman published several columns making light of channel 67's poor signal—hobbled by installation difficulties—and production values. In April, Kitman wrote,

The morning of March 6, a large crane went to the site of a leading cultural landmark on Long Island, the Ch. 67 transmitter and antenna off the expressway in Central Islip. The riggers turned the tower in a new direction. Since then, there have been bitter complaints from the Russian trawler fleet. ... By twisting the antenna very early that morning in March, Ch. 67 may have damaged the détente.

Kitman ran a survey asking for readers' comments on WSNL-TV's reception and programming in February 1974. Based on the survey, Kitman published "ratings" for the station's various local programs. He also published alleged reader comments as to the station's receivability. A man from Far Rockaway told Kitman, "Yes, I saw Channel 67. In TV Guide." In response, Suburban Broadcasting filed a $15 million lawsuit in New York Supreme Court against Kitman and Newsday in November 1974, claiming a "willful and malicious effort to mortally injure" WSNL-TV's chances as a "viable advertising medium".

Suburban's lawsuit against Kitman coincided with a retrenchment. Channel 67 had been in talks for a loan from Franklin National Bank, but the bank became insolvent and was closed in October 1974. The station's first election night coverage was almost affected by strike action among 12 unionized news employees. In October, WSNL laid off Oren Palenik, host of a women's program, and other hosts and increased its reliance on syndicated shows and films. The news programming was reduced to hourly news updates in January 1975, part of a reduction in local programming from 40 hours a week to just eight or nine hours and accompanying a layoff of one-fifth of the station's staff. In addition to filing suit against Kitman, Suburban sued equipment manufacturer RCA and tower fabricator Stainless Inc. for improper initial installation of the antenna. The company also sought new investors. In one last miscue, the station gave up its rights to telecast New York Cosmos soccer just two weeks before Pelé signed with the team.

The reduction in local programming and personnel failed to turn the station's finances around. The station left the air on June 20, 1975, while signing a deal with a company to use the Central Islip studios for commercial and film production. The suspension was described as temporary, lasting just three months. One broadcaster operating other UHF stations told The New York Times that Suburban failed to take its "VHF thinking" and translate it to the different economics of running a UHF television station. The station lost an average of $255,931 for each of the 20 months it was in business.

Suburban Broadcasting Corporation filed for bankruptcy in February 1976, listing assets of $3.9 million and liabilities of $4.8 million. Creditors were told that the station was about to become profitable when two of its three largest advertisers went out of business.

=== Subscription TV broadcasting ===
On August 24, 1978, Suburban Broadcasting found a Canadian white knight to pay its $5 million in debts. CanWest Capital Corporation provided the financing in a deal that saw CanWest's U.S. subscription television (STV) subsidiary, Universal Subscription Television, enter into a franchise agreement to provide pay broadcasting over WSNL-TV. CanWest, as a Canadian company, could not own stations outright, but it could provide them with subscription programming. As part of the deal, channel 67 changed its city of license from Patchogue to Smithtown, where enough commercial, free TV stations were received to permit FCC licensing of an STV station. The station began plans for reactivation in late 1979; in addition to subscription programming from Universal Subscription Television, WSNL-TV would air some local programming as a condition of its license.

WSNL-TV returned to Long Island screens on December 15, 1979, after nearly 4 1/2 years of silence, with a limited schedule of prime time programming during the week and daytime programs on weekends. A month later, Suburban filed to sell the station to a new joint venture led by Wometco Enterprises. This sale meant that, instead of programming from Universal Subscription Television, WSNL would provide STV programming from Wometco Home Theater (WHT). WHT had been operating in the New York market on channel 68 from Newark, New Jersey, at this point known as WWHT, since March 1, 1977; CanWest approached WHT because it was worried about the viability of a standalone STV service from WSNL. From January 30 to June 2, 1980, channel 67 was out of service because of an electrical fire at its Central Islip studios; the fire gutted the control room and burned so hot that a brick wall cracked. The station began airing Wometco Home Theater after returning to the air. It also offered old movies and a nightly newscast.

The FCC approved of Wometco acquiring WSNL-TV in November 1980. Because channels 67 and 68 had overlapping signals, Wometco would operate WSNL-TV as a simulcast of WWHT with up to four and a half hours a week of its own programming. Wometco closed on the purchase in January 1981, and in June, it bought out CanWest's interest in the joint venture and became the sole owner of WSNL while sharing ownership of WWHT with Blonder-Tongue Laboratories.

On November 30, 1981, WWHT–WSNL began airing daytime programming from the new Financial News Network (FNN) between 10 a.m. and 5 p.m. With the extended reach of WHT, the service boasted 111,200 subscribers in June 1982, making it the fourth-largest STV operation in the country behind the ON TV operations in Los Angeles and Chicago and the SelecTV operation in Los Angeles. This year was the peak for subscription operation as the early 1980s recession deepened and cable systems continued building out in areas served by STV. In addition, beginning in 1981, Wometco Home Theater was seen on WRBV-TV (channel 65) in southern New Jersey and the Philadelphia area, where at one point it claimed to have more than 20,000 subscribers before closing in November 1984.

WWHT and WSNL began broadcasting WHT programming 20 hours a day on March 1, 1983, and discontinued all ad-supported telecasting, including FNN and Uncle Floyd. They were able to do so because the FCC had abolished the so-called "28-hour rule"—which required stations to provide a minimum of, on average, four hours a day of non-subscription programming—in June 1982. The Uncle Floyd Show returned to television on the New Jersey Network later in 1983.

=== KKR buyout of Wometco ===
Mitchell Wolfson, the founder of Wometco, died of a heart attack on January 28, 1983. He left the company with no clear succession plan, and no one was designated as a succeeding chairman. In fact, Wolfson was the largest stockholder in Wometco at the time of his death.

After approving several measures in a shareholders meeting designed to prevent a hostile takeover, the Wolfson family and Wometco board sold the company to merchant banker Kohlberg Kravis Roberts & Co. (KKR) on September 21, 1983, in a $1 billion leveraged buyout, the largest in history at the time. While Wometco still existed after the buyout was completed on April 13, 1984, the company was taken private and split into two entities: one based around the television station licenses and Wometco Home Theater and the other centered around the theater chain, Miami Seaquarium, bottling, and cable divisions.

With rapidly advancing cable and declining subscriptions, KKR began the process of ending the subscription television era of WWHT and WSNL. On November 1, 1984, Wometco ceased programming the service and instead began passing through movies from SelecTV; at that time, it still counted some 80,000 subscribers. It sold the WHT service to Pay TV of Greater New York. That company renamed itself Cooper Wireless Cable and began broadcasting from the channel 60 translator, though in doing so it lost subscribers who could not receive the low-power signal from the World Trade Center. Though the stations continued to run WHT in the interim, KKR contemplated reformatting WWHT–WSNL as general-entertainment independents with syndicated reruns.

In April 1985, KKR executed another leveraged buyout, this one of Storer Communications, then facing a shareholder revolt and a hostile takeover attempt by Comcast. The deal was completed in December 1985; however, approval by the FCC was contingent on KKR divesting either Storer's cable systems in northern New Jersey and Connecticut, serving 195,000 subscribers, or WWHT–WSNL within 18 months to satisfy cross-ownership rules. While Storer and Wometco remained nominally separate companies, the FCC recognized KKR as the primary owner of both and forced it to make a number of station or system divestitures. Storer already had announced it would keep the cable systems over WWHT and WSNL.

== U68 ==
With the end of WHT programming, channels 68 and 67 switched to a music video format known as U68 on June 1, 1985. The new format came together in just ten days and originally broadcast for twelve hours a day. In the morning hours, WWHT and WSNL continued to offer non-video religious and community affairs shows.

U68 touted its format as specifically programmed for the New York market in contrast to the national cable service of MTV; it carved out time to air videos by local acts. It offered R&B, pop, and heavy metal music in dayparts, as well as music news breaks–which Uncle Floyd returned to channel 68 to co-host. It had a broader format than MTV with more urban contemporary and metal music; program director Steve Leeds called it "all over the place musically". As a music video station and not merely a program, it was subject to the six-month exclusivity that MTV demanded from some record labels for new titles. At the end of 1985, it extended to begin late-night broadcasting to 1 or 2 a.m. six nights a week. The service also produced a music video, for "Put That Head Out" by rap artist Funkmaster Wizard Wiz.

== Home shopping and Telefutura/UniMás ==
On August 4, 1986, the Home Shopping Network (HSN) announced that it would enter the broadcast television business by buying three stations in two acquisitions: WWHT and WSNL-TV, as well as the Boston area's WVJV "V-66", a station with a similar format to U68. The three stations went for $46 million. The stations would carry the newly established Home Shopping Network 2 service, which offered a more upscale assortment of products than the existing HSN. News that U68 was likely on its way out to make way for home shopping programming led Pablo Guzmán in the New York Daily News to praise the "quality service" that it provided to homes without cable in spite of MTV's restrictions and other challenges and his colleague Jim Farber to laud its "innovative, genre-busting programming and no creepy veejays". On October 6, 1986, HSN closed on the WWHT–WSNL deal and began programming both stations with home shopping. Five production employees lost their jobs with the transition to home shopping. HSN also changed the stations' call letters from WWHT and WSNL to WHSE and WHSI, respectively, effective January 23, 1987.

The purchase of the New York and Boston stations started a shopping spree for HSN. By January 1987, it had acquired stations serving Baltimore and Washington, D.C., Chicago, Cleveland, Houston, Los Angeles, and Philadelphia. It later added stations in the Dallas–Fort Worth, Miami, and Tampa Bay markets, giving it 12 stations and making it the fifth-largest station owner by reach in the country as of 1992, behind the Big Three networks and Tribune Broadcasting. That year, HSN spun off the twelve stations into a new company, Silver King Broadcasting.

A joint venture led by Barry Diller bought the Silver King stations in 1996, renaming the group USA Broadcasting. As late as 2000, the company promised to bring the CityVision general-entertainment independent format that USA Broadcasting was slowly rolling out in its portfolio to New York and Los Angeles. CityVision had made it to four cities, but it proved costly to operate and was a ratings disappointment outside of live sports. USA Station Group Partnership of New Jersey, the licensee of WHSE, registered a trademark on WORX as a future call sign in October 2000. After discussions for a joint venture with ABC fell apart, the USA Broadcasting stations were sold to Univision for $1.1 billion in a deal announced in December 2000. The USA–Univision deal created seven new duopolies, including the pairing of WHSE and WHSI with Univision's WXTV (channel 41).

In the immediate aftermath of the September 11 attacks of 2001, channel 68 temporarily simulcast WABC-TV, which had been broadcasting from the World Trade Center. It was later joined by channel 67. The station ceased broadcasting HSN on October 1, 2001, and temporarily switched to the American Independent Network.

Univision used most of the stations it acquired from USA Broadcasting to launch a second network, Telefutura, which debuted on January 14, 2002. The stations adopted new WFUT and WFTY call letters, respectively. Telefutura rebranded as UniMás in 2013.

In 2008, Univision experimented with adding 7 a.m. local morning newscasts to four of its Telefutura stations, including WFUT–WFTY. This continued through at least 2014.

In 2017, Univision reached a deal with the Justice Network, a diginet focusing on true crime and law enforcement programming, and provided it carriage in 11 markets, including New York City. Justice Network rebranded as True Crime Network in 2020.

== Technical information ==
Coverage areas of WFUT–WXTV (red) and WFTY-DT (blue). WFUT–WXTV, from the Empire State Building, serves New York City, the Hudson Valley, and northern New Jersey. WFTY-DT, from Middle Island, serves much of the southern Connecticut coast and eastern Long Island. The signals overlap over southwestern Connecticut and west-central Long Island.

=== Subchannels ===
The station's signal is multiplexed:

Subchannels of WFTY-DT
Subchannel	Res.	Short name	Programming
67.1	480i	CRIME	True Crime Network
67.2	720p	WFUT-DT	UniMás (WFUT-DT)
67.3	720p	WXTV-DT	Univision (WXTV-DT)
67.4	480i	GRIT	Grit
67.5	480i	MYSTERY	Ion Mystery
67.6	480i	ShopLC	Shop LC
67.8	480i	BT2	[Blank]

Simulcast of subchannels of another station
Subchannel broadcast with MPEG-4 video

=== Analog-to-digital conversion ===
WFTY ended regular programming on its analog signal, over UHF channel 67, on June 12, 2009, as part of the federally mandated transition from analog to digital television. The station's digital signal remained on its pre-transition UHF channel 23, using virtual channel 67.

== See also ==
- WFUT-DT
