= Channel 60 =

Channel 60 refers to several television stations:

== Canada ==
The following television stations operate on virtual channel 60 in Canada:

- CFMT-DT-2 in Ottawa, Ontario

== See also ==
- Channel 60 virtual TV stations in the United States
