= WUNI =

Television station in Marlborough, Massachusetts

ATSC 3.0 station
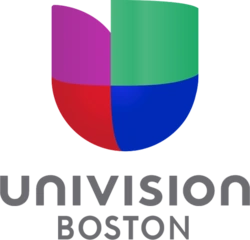
- Marlborough–Boston, Massachusetts; United States
- City: Marlborough, Massachusetts
- Channels: Digital: 27 (UHF), shared with WWJE-DT; Virtual: 66
- Branding: Univision Boston; Noticias Nueva Inglaterra (newscasts)

Programming
- Affiliations: 66.1: Univision; for others, see § Subchannels

Ownership
- Owner: TelevisaUnivision; (UniMas Boston LLC)
- Operator: Entravision Communications
- Sister stations: WWJE-DT; WUTF-TV

History
- First air date: February 12, 1985
- Former call signs: WVJV-TV (1985–1987); WHSH (1987–1992); WHSH-TV (1992–2000); WHUB-TV (2000–2001); WFUB (2001); WUTF (2001–2009); WUTF-DT (2009–2017)
- Former channel numbers: Analog: 66 (UHF, 1985–2009); Digital: 23 (UHF, 1998–2009)
- Former affiliations: V-66: music videos (1985–1986); HSN (1986–2000, 2001–2002); Independent (2001–2002); Telefutura/UniMás (2002–2017)
- Call sign meaning: Univision

Technical information
- Licensing authority: FCC
- Facility ID: 60551
- ERP: 400 kW
- HAAT: 356 m (1,168 ft)
- Transmitter coordinates: 42°23′2.7″N 71°29′35.3″W

Links
- Public license information: Public file; LMS
- Website: noticiasnuevainglaterra.com

WUNI (channel 66) is a television station licensed to Marlborough, Massachusetts, United States, broadcasting the Spanish-language Univision network to the Boston area. It is owned by TelevisaUnivision alongside True Crime Network affiliate WWJE-DT (channel 50) and operated by Entravision Communications with UniMás affiliate WUTF-TV (channel 27). WUNI and WWJE share studios on 4th Avenue in Needham and are broadcast from a transmitter facility on Parmenter Road in Hudson.

Channel 66 began broadcasting on February 12, 1985, as the all–music video station WVJV-TV, known as V-66. Founded by former Boston disc jockeys John Garabedian and Arnie Ginsburg and based in Framingham, WVJV aimed to be a local alternative to MTV with the ability to respond to market needs. V-66 attracted viewers immediately but proved unable to grow its audience share, turn a profit, or develop local non-video programming. With high demand for TV stations in the Boston market, it was put up for sale in mid-1986. The Home Shopping Network (HSN) bought WVJV-TV and a similar New York station, WWHT, in 1986, marking its debut in over-the-air broadcasting. The station changed its call sign to WHSH-TV and, with one exception, broadcast nearly continuous home shopping programming from October 1986 to January 2002. The exception was five months in 2000–2001 when the station became a local, general-entertainment independent station as WHUB-TV "Hub 66". The conversion was the last of four among the USA Broadcasting stations, the former HSN stations division, into locally focused stations.

Hub 66's existence was cut short when USA Broadcasting sold its stations to Univision. Most of the stations were used to launch the Telefutura network, now UniMás, on January 14, 2002. In the Boston market and others where Entravision owned Univision stations, Univision signed an agreement for Entravision to manage both stations together. In 2017, Univision programming moved to channel 66 as part of a multi-market swap. The station produces a 6 p.m. local newscast.

== WVJV: V-66 ==
66 Corporation applied in February 1979 for a construction permit to use channel 66, allocated to Worcester, Massachusetts, at nearby Marlborough. The applicant was a subsidiary of Home Service Broadcasting Corporation, owner of Natick radio station WGTR. Home Service's president, John Garabedian, said that the Marlborough area needed a television station more than Worcester, which already had WSMW-TV (channel 27). Garabedian did not expect action by the Federal Communications Commission (FCC) for seven to eight years on the station application, but approval came much sooner, on July 17, 1980. The FCC approved the application, even though it generally barred AM radio stations from owning TV stations, because of the local ownership and programming focus. Garabedian promised a looped newsmagazine format, which he compared to an all-day version of the Evening Magazine program and the 1950s documentary series Wide Wide World, and limited longform newscasts. Despite approval, channel 66 was put on hold while WGTR was upgraded to a power level of 50,000 watts. Later that year, Garabedian became the sole owner of the construction permit, trading his stake in WGTR for the rights to channel 66 and an unbuilt FM station on Nantucket. In 1984, the Nantucket station was sold for $1.05 million.

Garabedian decided to adopt a music video format, believing young viewers would be interested in lifestyle programming and calling the cable channel MTV "terrible" at the time. Ahead of launching, Boston disc jockey Arnie Ginsburg became a 10-percent owner, and Kidder, Peabody & Company provided financing. Channel 66 began broadcasting on February 12, 1985, as WVJV-TV "V-66", an all–music video station with studios in Framingham and the first new television station in Greater Boston since 1979. WVJV provided a format similar to MTV except for the inclusion of some local radio personalities and its availability to homes without cable television; (Note: Though billed in New England as the first of its kind, they were beaten to the format by KRLR in Las Vegas, which started in July 1984.) its musical style sat between the competing rock radio stations WBCN and WXKS-FM. Its 1,400-foot (430 m) transmitter tower was located near Lake Boon in Hudson, broadcasting the first stereo television signal in the area. WVJV started with almost exclusively direct-response advertisements before attracting higher-quality advertisers seeking to reach viewers aged 18 to 34. For video jockeys, V-66 had its own personalities as well as some from the local radio scene, including WXKS's Joe White and Dale Dorman and WAAF's Bob and Zip.

On April 28, 1986, WVJV introduced an evening block of non-music video programs. These included the game show The $100,000 Pyramid and two local series, Boston Tonight (hosted by Garabedian) and Boston SportsBeat (co-hosted by Bill Stephens). Ed Siegel of The Boston Globe compared Boston Tonight to "a yuppie version of Evening Magazine". The new programming came at a time when WVJV, which had made an immediate mark in the ratings, was failing to grow its audience and even MTV was starting to add longer shows, beyond music videos. Garabedian told The New York Times, "We are not a music-television station. We are a TV station aimed at a lifestyle. The nature of music-video programming is like a fast-food restaurant—viewers can walk in any time they want, grab a hamburger, gobble it and leave. The ratings services go by five-minute periods, but a video is four minutes long. If the next one comes on and the viewer doesn't like it, click! We need specific programs that people can look forward to." The previously 24-hour operation began signing off overnight to save on electricity. In early June, the programs were canceled and the staff of 30 hired to produce them laid off after ratings surveys indicated they were seen in fewer than 10,000 households, a number low enough to put off potential advertisers. Garabedian blamed people not realizing that WVJV was broadcasting programming other than videos and viewers' loyalty to existing programming in the time slots. In a 2008 interview, he noted that people did not stay tuned to channel 66 for long: "We weren't sticky enough. We needed to be sticky to keep people watching." In May 1986, Arbitron found that WVJV reached 324,000 people a week, good for sixth among the Boston market's six independent stations.

Though the principals were willing to lose money in the first three years to "[do] the format the right way", V-66—which Garabedian projected to lose $3 million in its first year—lost twice as much money. Operators of other stations with similar formats claimed that advertisers' lack of experience with the format and inaccurate ratings measurement kept their advertising rates low and caused them to lose money. In late June 1986, Garabedian and Ginsburg put WVJV-TV up for sale, citing a lack of growth potential, a plateauing of the interest in music videos, and strong demand for other Boston stations. In the six months previous to the announcement, WXNE-TV, WSBK-TV, and WQTV had all been put on the market.

Retrospectively, WVJV was credited with giving a spotlight to local Boston musical groups such as 'Til Tuesday and Extreme and for playing more heavy metal music than MTV, though some in the local music scene felt the station focused often on local artists but not on underground local artists. It played the music video for the a-ha song "Take On Me", which MTV had mostly ignored when it released, helping propel the band to fame. In 2008, filmmakers Eric Green and Christian de Rezendes began producing a documentary on WVJV-TV, Life on the V: The Story of V-66. The film premiered in 2014 at the Independent Film Festival of Boston.

== WHSH-TV and WHUB-TV: Home shopping and CityVision ==
For between $19 and $20 million, WVJV-TV was sold to the Home Shopping Network (HSN) in a deal announced in August 1986. The acquisition of WVJV-TV was announced at the same time as that of the New York market combo of WWHT and WSNL and signaled the entry of HSN into the broadcast television industry. The three stations went for $46 million. The stations would carry the newly established Home Shopping Network 2 service, which offered a more upscale assortment of products than the existing HSN; until the sale was approved by the FCC and closed, WVJV began broadcasting home shopping for 15 hours a day. By January 23, 1987, when WVJV changed its call sign to WHSH to incorporate the initials "HS" for "home shopping", the network owned nine stations. Except for some children's, religious, and ethnic programming on Sundays, WHSH broadcast home shopping around the clock. The company later added stations in the Dallas–Fort Worth, Miami, and Tampa Bay markets, giving it 12 stations and making it the fifth-largest station owner by reach in the country as of 1992, behind the Big Three networks and Tribune Broadcasting. That year, HSN spun off the twelve stations into a new company, Silver King Broadcasting.

A joint venture led by Barry Diller bought the Silver King stations in 1996, renaming the group USA Broadcasting. Beginning in 1998, USA Broadcasting began recasting the home shopping stations, one by one, as general-entertainment independents using a format known as "CityVision", inspired by Citytv in Toronto. Miami's WAMI was first in 1998, followed by WHOT-TV in Atlanta and KSTR-TV in the Dallas–Fort Worth market in 1999. WHSH was the fourth station earmarked for CityVision conversion, with hopes that once New York and Los Angeles followed, CityVision could increase its original programming budget.

On August 1, 2000, WHSH-TV became WHUB-TV, known as Hub 66. Its new program lineup included syndicated series, the USA original programs Strip Poker and 10's, and Boston University men's hockey. It was the fourth—and final—CityVision station. The format failed to take off where it was introduced, and USA Broadcasting registered operating losses of $62 million in 2000 (equivalent to $116 million in 2025). After discussions for a joint venture with ABC fell apart, the USA Broadcasting stations were sold to Univision for $1.1 billion (equivalent to $2.06 billion in 2025) in a deal announced in December 2000.

In the interim, WHUB returned to carrying HSN programming on January 31, 2001, to cut costs. The move left Boston University without an outlet for its hockey and basketball telecasts, with AT&T Broadband acquiring the rights to the Beanpot hockey tournament.

== As a Spanish-language station ==
Univision already had a Boston-market affiliate, WUNI (channel 27), owned by Entravision Communications. Univision used most of the stations it acquired from USA Broadcasting to launch a second network, Telefutura, which debuted on January 14, 2002. WHUB-TV changed call signs to WFUB on November 1, 2001, and to WUTF-TV on December 15. When the network launched, Univision entered into a joint sales agreement with Entravision, whereby Entravision provided local sales and promotional services to the Univision-owned Telefutura stations in six markets: Albuquerque, Boston, Denver, Orlando, Tampa, and Washington, D.C. This agreement was replaced by a new version in 2004. Telefutura rebranded as UniMás in 2013.

On December 4, 2017, as part of a multi-market realignment, the programming and call signs of WUNI and WUTF were swapped: WUNI and its Univision programming moved to the Univision-owned facility using digital channel 27 and virtual channel 66, while Entravision's digital channel 29 and virtual channel 27 facility became the new home of UniMás affiliate WUTF-TV. WUNI was already airing a local 6 p.m. newscast, which had debuted in 2003.

== Technical information ==
WHSH commenced digital service in November 1998 and was Boston's second digital television station. It was chosen as a test site by USA Broadcasting because its tower needed to be replaced, allowing room for the digital facility on channel 23. The station ceased analog service on channel 66 with the digital television transition in 2009 and moved its digital signal to channel 27.

On January 31, 2023, WUNI began broadcasting ATSC 3.0 (NextGen TV) service for six participating Boston stations.

=== Subchannels ===
The station's ATSC 1.0 channels are carried on the multiplexed signals of other Boston television stations:

Subchannels provided by WUNI (ATSC 1.0)
Subchannel	Res.	Short name	Programming	ATSC 1.0 host
66.1	1080i	WUNI-DT	Univision	WNEU
66.2	480i	MSGold	MovieSphere Gold	WFXT
66.3	480i	GetTV	Great	WFXT
66.4	480i	CourtTV	Court TV	WSBK-TV
66.5	480i	ON AIR	Infomercials	WGBH-TV

WUNI broadcasts itself, WWJE-DT (channel 50), and the other ATSC 3.0 participating stations from its transmitter in Hudson, Massachusetts.

Subchannels of WUNI and WWJE-DT (ATSC 3.0)
License	Subchannel	Res.	Short name	Programming
WUNI	2.1	1080p	WGBH*NX	PBS (WGBH-TV)
WUNI	4.1	1080p	WBZ*NX	CBS (WBZ-TV)
WUNI	5.1	1080p	WCVB*NX	ABC (WCVB-TV)
WUNI	15.1	1080p	WBTS*NX	NBC (WBTS-CD)
WUNI	25.1	1080p	WFXT*NX	Fox (WFXT)
WUNI	66.1	1080p	WUNI*NX	Univision
WWJE-DT	50.1	480p	WWJE*NX	True Crime Network (via WCVB-TV)

Subchannel broadcast with digital rights management
