= USA Broadcasting =

American television broadcasting company

- Type: Subsidiary
- Industry: Broadcast television
- Predecessor: Silver King Broadcasting (1986–1998)
- Founded: 1986; 40 years ago
- Defunct: May 21, 2001; 25 years ago
- Fate: Stations sold to Univision
- Successor: TelevisaUnivision
- Headquarters: Newark, New Jersey
- Area served: United States
- Key people: Lowell "Bud" Paxson, Roy Speer (former Silver King Owners), and Barry Diller
- Products: Broadcast television
- Parent: USA Networks, Inc.
- Divisions: Studios USA Television; USA Home Entertainment; USA Cable Entertainment

USA Broadcasting was an American television broadcasting company owned by the veteran entertainment industry executive Barry Diller. This company was the over-the-air broadcasting arm of USA Networks. Before founding USA Broadcasting, Diller was a helper in Gulf+Western's failed Paramount Television Service and News Corporation's new Fox Broadcasting Company that was launched on October 9, 1986.

== History ==
USA Broadcasting dates back on in 1995 when Diller purchased Silver King Broadcasting from Lowell W. "Bud" Paxson and Roy Speer. Paxson and Speer had previously assembled the group to expand Home Shopping Network onto broadcast television. However, the Home Shopping Network split from Silver King Broadcasting in 1992 and not return until after Diller gained ownership of the company. Under an agreement which was made in August 1996, both Silver King Broadcasting and the Home Shopping Network would merge their stations. The stations carried the Home Shopping Club (now America's Store). Home Shopping Network, Inc. later brought Universal's television units from Seagram, renaming them USA Networks, Inc., and its broadcast television subsidiary USA Broadcasting in 1998.

Diller planned to remove shopping shows and infomercials from most of the stations' broadcast days and replace them with local and syndicated programs, including a few produced by sister production unit Studios USA Television that also aired nationally on USA Network. He wanted to tie each of the stations very closely to the communities they served, and to open up opportunities for locally produced programs. This format was dubbed "CityVision", and took heavy influence from the format used by CITY-TV in Toronto (and more prominently, that station's sister broadcast television properties that became charter stations of Citytv, when CHUM Limited expanded the format to other Canadian markets as a television system in 2002, and similar to USA's sale of its stations to Univision, suffered a similar fate when CHUM agreed to merge with CTVglobemedia (now Bell Media), owner of the CTV Television Network).

By 2000, four stations were transformed into Diller's new model: WAMI-TV (WAMI "Whammy" 69) in Miami, WHOT ("Hotlanta 34") in Atlanta, WHUB ("Hub" 66) in Boston, and KSTR ("K-Star" 49) in the Dallas-Fort Worth area. WAMI and KSTR aired local news, talk shows and sporting events. WHOT and WHUB broadcast syndicated programming as well as local sports. WAMI broadcast Miami Heat basketball and Florida Marlins baseball games. WHOT and KSTR also carried professional basketball games of, respectively, the Atlanta Hawks and Dallas Mavericks. WHUB acquired the rights to the annual Beanpot hockey tournament between four of Boston's colleges and also rights to Boston University's men's ice hockey games. HSC/America's Store continues to broadcast late at night and on weekends.

=== Financial issues and shutdown ===
Logos of the stations USA Broadcasting converted to the CityVision format

There were also plans to convert stations in Newark and its satellite in Smithtown (proposed callsign: WORX, "The Works"), Los Angeles (proposed callsign: KLIK, "Click"), Chicago (proposed callsign: WNDE, "Windy") and Atlantic City/Philadelphia (proposed callsign: WACY, "Wacky", or an equivalent, as that callsign was already in use), to the new local-TV model. However, due to financial troubles in 2000, USA Broadcasting had scrapped those plans and reduced programming on its existing independent stations. In the summer of 2000, Diller suddenly put the entire station roster up for sale. Disney/ABC and Univision were the companies in the running to buy the stations, but Univision outbid Disney in a close race. On May 21, 2001, Univision purchased the stations and converted them into Spanish-language outlets. Some affiliated with Univision, but most joined its new sister network, Telefutura (renamed UniMás in 2013), which was launched on January 14, 2002.

USA Networks eventually exited the television market by selling USA Network to Vivendi Universal Entertainment, a subsidiary of Vivendi Universal SA that owns Universal Studios, also in 2001, which in May 2004, sold Vivendi Universal's entertainment assets (excluding Universal Music Group) to General Electric, which later transferred its NBC (including another Spanish-language network Telemundo) assets to Vivendi Universal Entertainment, and later renamed it NBCUniversal; this marked USA Networks' slight return to the broadcast industry as NBCU owns the flagship NBC network, and NBCU owns its own NBC and Telemundo stations. NBCUniversal is now owned by Comcast, after the latter half-acquired the percent of the company in 2011, and fully acquired it in 2013. Over a decade later in January 2026, Comcast spin off nearly all of its NBCU cable networks and selected digital properties (including USA Network) into a new company called Versant, which remains the current owner to this day.

== Other stations ==
Silver King/USA Broadcasting briefly owned four Fox affiliate stations, formerly owned by SF Broadcasting: WLUK (Green Bay, Wisconsin), KHON (Honolulu, Hawaii), WALA (Mobile, Alabama), and WVUE (New Orleans, Louisiana). That ownership was between from November 27, 1995, until April 1, 1998, before the four stations were sold to Emmis Communications. Emmis eventually departed from television ownership and resold the stations to other parties, including LIN TV Corporation and in WVUE's case, a group led by the owner of the New Orleans Saints, Tom Benson in 2008.

== Former stations ==
- Stations are arranged in alphabetical order by state and city of license.
- Two boldface asterisks appearing following a station's call letters (**) indicate a station built and signed on by Silver King.

Stations owned by Silver King and/or USA Broadcasting
| Media market | State | Station | Purchased | Sold | Notes |
|---|---|---|---|---|---|
| Mobile | Alabama | WALA-TV | 1996 | 1998 | |
| Los Angeles | California | KHSC-TV | 1987 | 2001 | |
| San Francisco–Oakland | California | KPST-TV | 1996 | 2001 | |
| Miami–Fort Lauderdale | Florida | WYHS-TV ** | 1988 | 2001 | (Note: Converted to the CityVision format in 1999.) (Note: Known as WAMI-TV from 1999 onward.) |
| Orlando | Florida | WBSF | 1988 | 2001 | |
| Tampa–St. Petersburg | Florida | WBHS-TV ** | 1988 | 2001 | |
| Atlanta | Georgia | WNGM-TV | 1999 | 2001 | (Note: Known as WHOT-TV from 1999 to 2001.) |
| Honolulu | Hawaii | KHON-TV | 1996 | 1998 | |
| Chicago | Illinois | WEHS-TV | 1987 | 2001 | |
| New Orleans | Louisiana | WVUE | 1996 | 1998 | |
| Baltimore | Maryland | WHSW-TV | 1987 | 1998 | |
| Boston | Massachusetts | WHSH-TV | 1986 | 2001 | (Note: Known as WHUB-TV from 2000 to 2001.) |
| New York | New York | WHSE-TV | 1986 | 2001 | |
| New York | New York | WHSI-TV | 1986 | 2001 | (Note: Satellite of WHSE-TV.) |
| Cleveland | Ohio | WQHS-TV | 1986 | 2001 | |
| Philadelphia | Pennsylvania | WHSP-TV | 1986 | 2001 | |
| Dallas–Fort Worth | Texas | KHSX-TV | 1987 | 2001 | (Note: Known as KSTR-TV from 1999 onward.) |
| Houston | Texas | KHSH-TV | 1987 | 2001 | |
| Green Bay | Wisconsin | WLUK-TV | 1996 | 1998 | |
