= Channel 60 virtual TV stations in the United States =

The following television stations operate on virtual channel 60 in the United States:

- KFXV in Harlingen, Texas
- KPJK in San Mateo, California
- KVDA in San Antonio, Texas
- W33ET-D in New York, New York
- WBPH-TV in Bethlehem, Pennsylvania
- WKHU-CD in Kittanning, Pennsylvania
- WNEU in Merrimack, New Hampshire
- WTJP-TV in Gadsden, Alabama
- WWPX-TV in Martinsburg, West Virginia
- WXFT-DT in Aurora, Illinois
