= WADO =

Spanish-language Regional Mexican music radio station in New York City

- New York, New York; United States
- Broadcast area: New York Metropolitan area
- Frequency: 1280 kHz
- Branding: Qué Buena 1280AM

Programming
- Language: Spanish
- Format: Regional Mexican music

Ownership
- Owner: Uforia Audio Network; (Univision Radio Stations Group, Inc.)
- Sister stations: Radio: WXNY-FM; TV: WFTY-DT; WFUT-DT; WXTV-DT

History
- First air date: January 30, 1927
- Former call signs: WGL (1926–1928); WOV (1928–1959)
- Former frequencies: 678 kHz (1927); 720 kHz (1927); 1020 kHz (1927–1928); 1130 kHz (1928–1940); 1100 kHz (1940–1941)
- Call sign meaning: Call letters phonetically sound similar to "radio"

Technical information
- Licensing authority: FCC
- Facility ID: 70684
- Class: B
- Power: 50,000 watts (day); 7,200 watts (night)
- Transmitter coordinates: 40°49′36.36″N 74°4′30.51″W
- Repeater: 96.3 WXNY-FM HD2 (New York)

Links
- Public license information: Public file; LMS
- Webcast: Listen live (via iHeartRadio)
- Website: www.univision.com/radio/nueva-york-wado-am

WADO (1280 kHz) is a commercial AM radio station licensed to serve New York, New York. It is owned by Uforia Audio Network, and broadcasts a Spanish–language regional Mexican format.

By day, WADO transmits with 50,000 watts, the maximum permitted for American AM stations. At night, it reduces power to 7,200 watts to protect other stations on 1280 AM from interference. It uses a directional antenna with a four-tower array. The station's transmitter is located on New Jersey Route 120 in Carlstadt, New Jersey.

== Programming ==
WADO broadcasts Uforia programs including "El Free-Guey Show", music, and all games of the New York Jets, New York Yankees, and some games of New York Knicks and New York Islanders. It previously aired the New York City FC soccer team.

== History ==
=== WGL and WOV ===
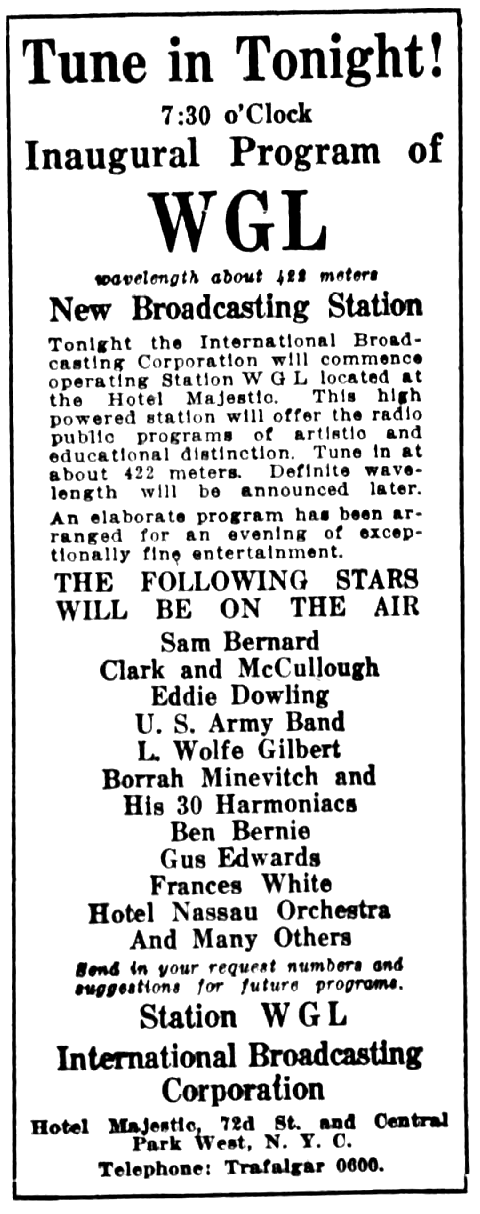
WGL debuted on January 30, 1927. The wavelength of "about 422 meters" corresponds to a frequency of 710 kHz.

The station debuted, as WGL, and was first reported in December 1926, owned by the International Broadcasting Corporation in New York City. WGL's start occurred during a period when the U.S. government had temporarily lost its authority to assign transmitting frequencies, and at the end of 1926 the station was reported to be on a non-standard frequency of 678 kHz. On January 30, 1927, the station signed on, with International Broadcasting president Colonel Lewis Landes stating on the inaugural broadcast, "The International Broadcasting Corporation's aim is to adhere to truth, to be free of partisanship, religious or political."

Full government regulation of radio was restored with the formation of the Federal Radio Commission (FRC). Stations were initially issued a series of temporary authorizations starting on May 3, 1927, which assigned WGL to 720 kHz. The station also moved to Secaucus, New Jersey. WGL's assignment was changed to 1170 kHz, with WOR in Newark moving to 710 kHz. WGL's owners wanted to remain on 720 kHz, and after WOR was awarded 710 kHz, both stations went to court, with WOR eventually winning the case. In June 1927, WGL moved to 1020 AM, sharing this frequency with a Paterson station, WODA. In August 1927, studio manager Charles Isaacson announced one of the city's first attempts at local news coverage. WGL was organizing listeners to volunteer as radio reporters and call the station with breaking news stories.

Stations were informed that if they wanted to continue operating, they needed to file a formal license application by January 15, 1928, as the first step in determining whether they met the new "public interest, convenience, or necessity" standard. On May 25, 1928, the FRC issued General Order 32, which notified 164 stations, including WGL, that "From an examination of your application for future license it does not find that public interest, convenience, or necessity would be served by granting it." However, the station successfully convinced the commission that it should remain licensed.

On September 16, 1928, WGL changed its call sign to WOV and was sold to Sicilian-born importer John Iraci. (The callsign WGL was then picked up by a station in Fort Wayne, Indiana.) On November 11, 1928, with the implementation of the FRC's General Order 40, WOV was moved to 1130 kHz, with an authorization that limited it to a schedule of daytime to 6 p.m.

=== Italian programming ===
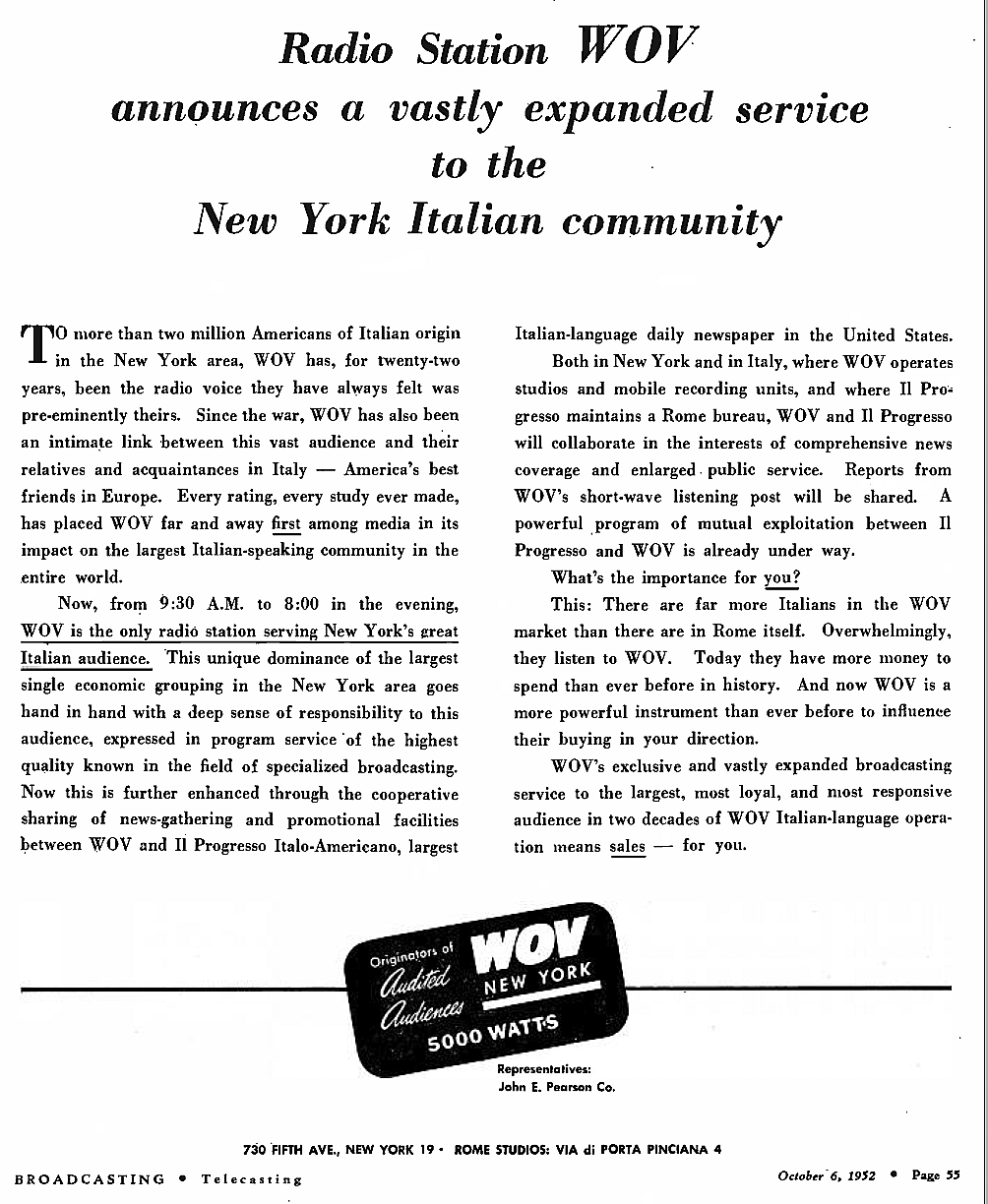
Through the early 1960s WOV was known for its Italian language programs.

WOV's initial programming was aimed at a general audience, but by the mid-1930s, it strengthened its ethnic ties and expanded its Italian-language programming to fill the daytime hours. WOV soon became the dominant Italian voice in the Northeast through its affiliation with share-time station WBIL and Iraci's WPEN in Philadelphia. During this time, the Italian-American accordionist John Serry Sr. was featured as a soloist in several broadcasts on WOV early in his professional career in 1931.

In early 1940, WOV made a major upgrade in facilities, when stations WPG and WBIL on 1100 kHz were deleted, and WOV moved to this vacated frequency. The next March, with the implementation of the North American Regional Broadcasting Agreement, stations on 1100 kHz were moved as a group to 1130 kHz, meaning WOV returned to its previous assignment.

=== November 12, 1941, call sign swap between WNEW and WOV ===
Later in 1941, stations WOV and WNEW traded identities, with the call sign and programming of WOV moving from 1130 to WNEW's 1280 kHz assignment, while WNEW did the reverse, with its call sign and programming moving from 1280 to WOV's 1130 kHz assignment. The Federal Communications Commission (FCC) approved the call sign changes on November 12, 1941, and the transfer was finalized on December 1, 1941, consisting of an "exchange of power, call letters and transmitting equipment between WOV and WNEW". Thus, following this exchange, the callsign WOV was now used on the station on 1280 kHz.

=== Top 40 and R&B ===
The station was owned by WOV Broadcasting until 1959, when it was sold to Bartell Broadcasters, at which time the station's call sign was changed to WADO. During the day, WADO broadcast Top 40 and R&B music. At night, it ran Italian programming. By 1962, some Spanish programming was run on weekends. By 1963, the only English programming found on WADO was its Sunday religious broadcasts.

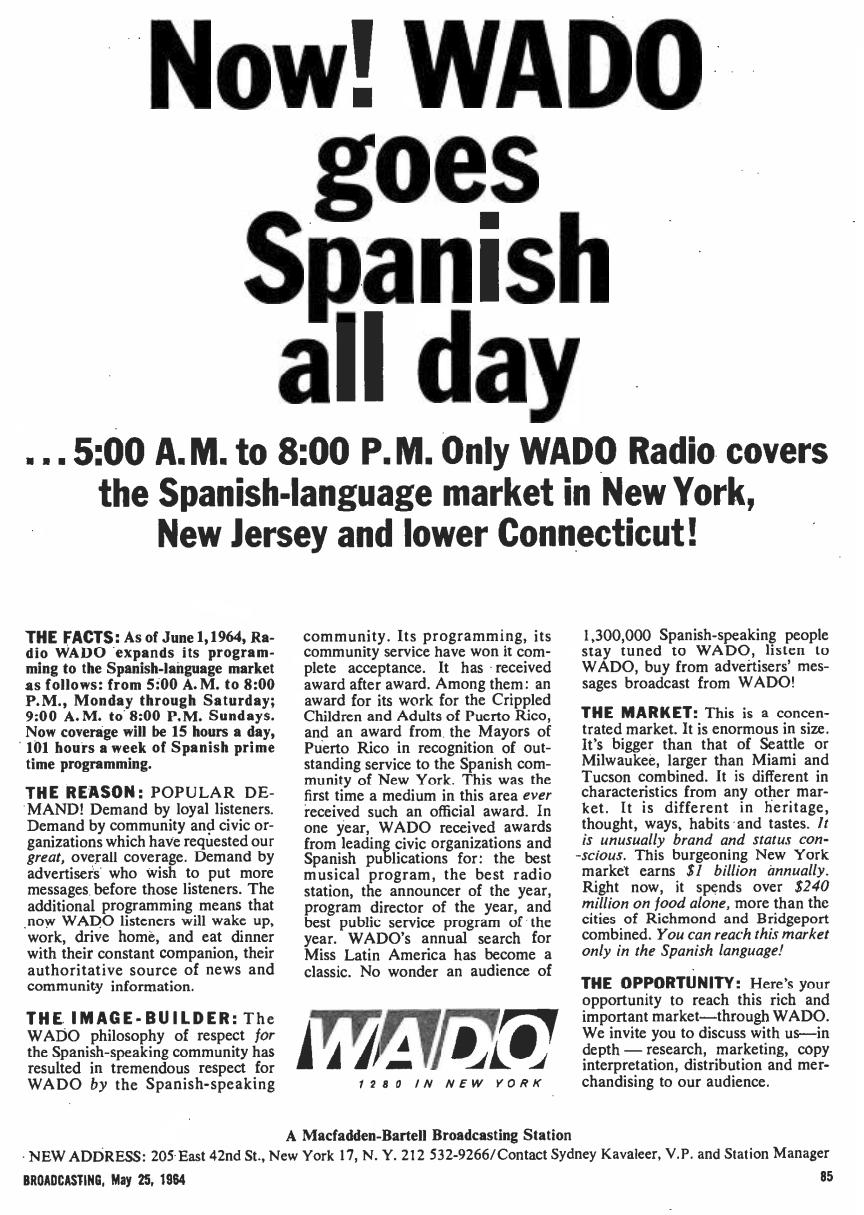
In the early 1960s the station, now WADO, began to emphasize Spanish language programming.

=== Ethnic programming ===
In 1964, WADO began broadcasting completely in Spanish from 5 a.m. to 8 p.m., and Italian from 8 p.m. to Midnight. Overnight, Asian programming was run. By 1970, additional Spanish-language programming had replaced the Asian programming.

=== Musical programming ===
In terms of music, the station played a blend of Spanish MOR and Spanish oldies. WADO evolved to a Spanish adult contemporary music and oldies format by the mid-1970s. Italian programming was dropped in 1971.

Four full-time Spanish stations battled for listeners during the 1980s: WADO, WKDM, WSKQ, and WJIT. Only WADO remains as a secular Spanish-language station. WKDM airs Spanish Christian radio programming, and the other two have ethnic programs in Russian and Mandarin Chinese.

=== Ownership changes ===
The station was sold to Command Broadcasting in 1979. In 1986, Heftel Broadcasting acquired the station, and over the next three years, moved to a Spanish-language adult contemporary music and talk format. By the early-1990s, WADO was a Spanish language news and talk station.

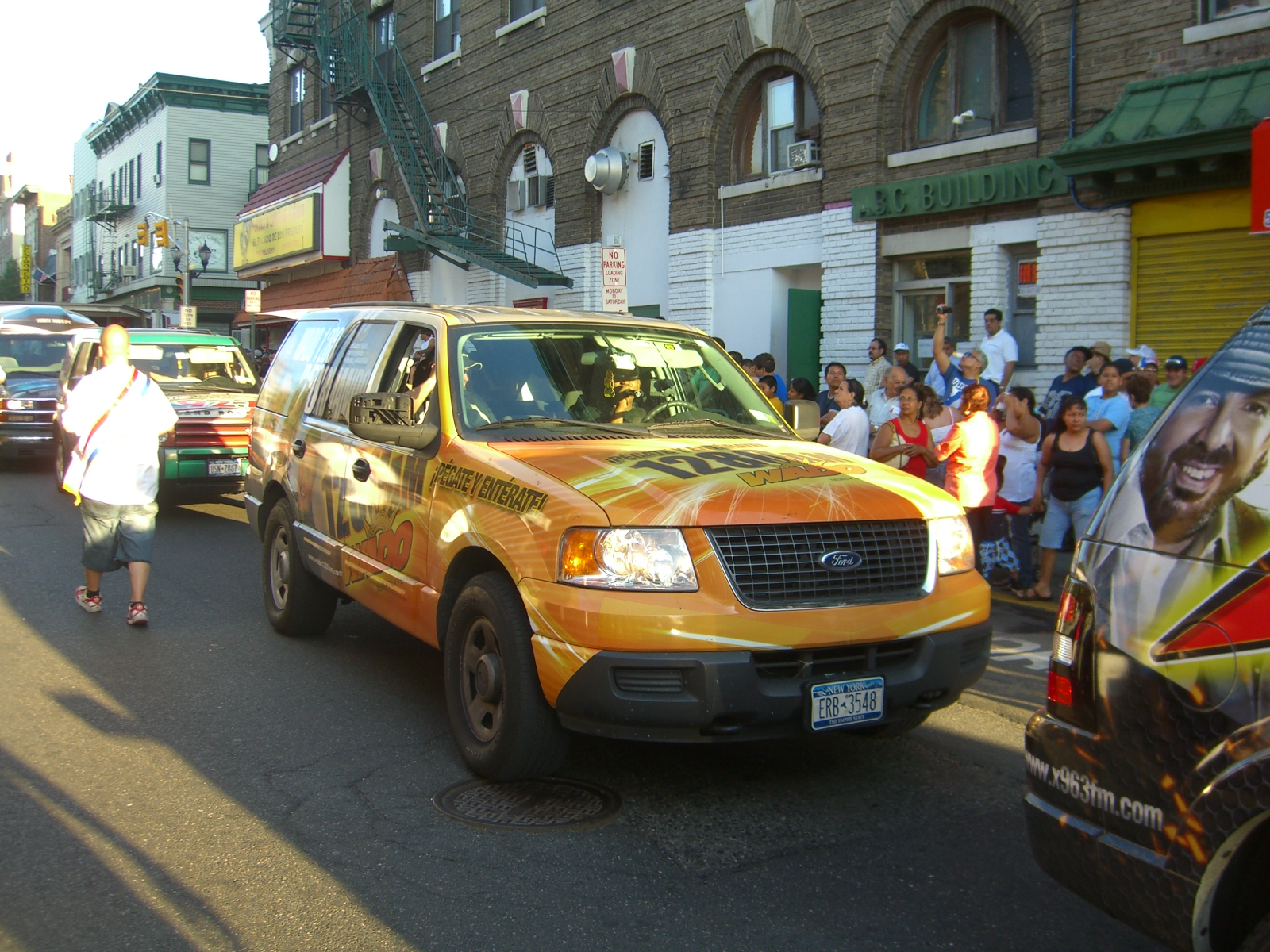
A WADO car in the 2010 North Hudson Cuban Day Parade in Union City, New Jersey.

In March 1996, Heftel bought WPAT and put a Spanish MOR format there, which would later grow to cover additional languages such as Korean. In 1997, Heftel restructured into Hispanic Broadcasting. The company sold WPAT to Multicultural Radio Broadcasting, and acquired WNWK from them. The brokered shows from WNWK went to WPAT, while WNWK became Spanish tropical station WCAA. WADO remained news and talk. In 2002, Hispanic Broadcasting was sold to Univision.

On December 20, 2016, Univision announced that WADO would be one of the charter network affiliates of Univision Deportes Radio, the company's new Spanish-language sports network launched on April 19, 2017.

On June 3, 2022, Univision announced it would sell a package of 18 radio stations across 10 of its markets, primarily AM outlets in large cities and entire clusters in smaller markets such as McAllen, Texas, and Fresno, California, for $60 million to a new company known as Latino Media Network (LMN); Univision proposed to handle operations for a year under agreement before turning over operational control to LMN in the fourth quarter of 2023. WADO was originally included in the deal, but was planned to have the transfer being completed separately while the Environmental Protection Agency conducted dredging at the station's transmitter site; in November 2023, TelevisaUnivision and LMN jointly informed the FCC that WADO would not be sold.

On February 13, 2025, it was announced that WADO would flip to regional Mexican on February 14 as "Qué Buena 1280 AM"; the format and "Qué Buena" branding had previously been used by former sister station WQBU-FM. The format change was subsequently postponed; the station's talk and sports programming would continue until April 1, when "Qué Buena" launched. A competing regional Mexican format with the similar "La Buena" branding airs on the second HD Radio channel of WQHT.

=== Power increase ===
Associated with the "Rio" treaty on AM broadcast standards, the FCC began to entertain the idea of power increases on formerly regional channels like 1280. Application was made to raise day power from 5,000 watts on two towers to 50,000 watts on a four-tower system. This remained on file, and was periodically amended as the ownership changed. In 1998, the FCC granted a construction permit (CP) for daytime operation with 50,000 watts. While planning the rebuilt site, engineering director David Stewart hit on the idea of a night power increase using the proposed four-day towers (the licensed night site was two of those four towers). The night CP was granted for 7,200 watts. The new system went on air in 2000 using a Harris DX-50 transmitter for days and a DX-10 for nights. The phasing and coupling equipment was designed by Ron Rackley at duTreil, Lundin and Rackley.
