= Wometco Enterprises =

American company

Wometco Enterprises (also known simply as Wometco) is an American company headquartered in Coral Gables, Florida; a suburb of Miami. It was once a large media company with diversified holdings, but slowly sold off its assets during the early 1980s, and owned the Miami Seaquarium until it was sold in 2014.

== History ==
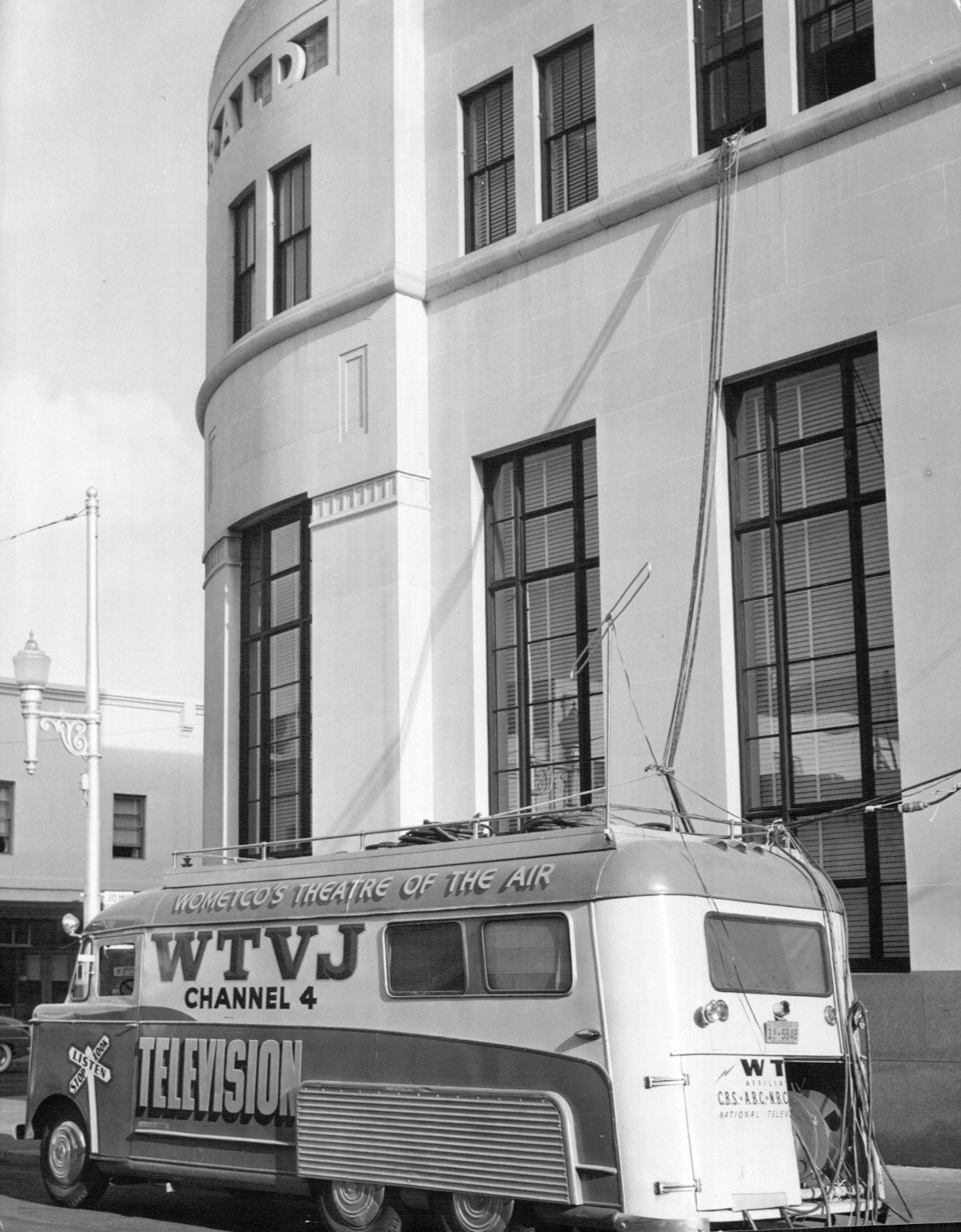
Mobile truck for the Wometco-owned WTVJ in front of the Miami Herald building in downtown Miami, c. 1950.

Wometco was founded in 1925 as the Wolfson-Meyer Theater Company, a movie theatre chain based in Miami. The company's co-founders were brothers-in-law Mitchell Wolfson (1900–1983) and Sidney Meyer. The first movie theater opened by the firm was the Capitol Theater in downtown Miami, built in 1926. Over the years the company built up the largest chain of movie theaters in South Florida, and adopted the portmanteau name of Wometco sometime in the 1950s.

In 1949 Wometco moved into broadcasting with the founding of WTVJ in Miami, Florida's first television station. The station signed on in March 1949 from studios inside the Capitol Theatre, which was renovated for television. Wometco was also a founding partner of WFGA-TV (now WTLV) in Jacksonville, Florida, which signed on in September 1957 with Wometco holding 20 percent ownership; though it would gradually decrease its stake over time, Wometco remained the station's primary stockholder until WTLV was sold to Harte-Hanks Communications in 1975.

Wometco purchased a majority interest in WMTV in Madison, Wisconsin in June 1957, but sold its shares less than a year later to Lee Enterprises, in April 1958. Also in 1958 the firm purchased controlling interest of WLOS-AM-FM-TV in Asheville, North Carolina, and KVOS-TV in Bellingham, Washington was added in 1961. In 1976 Wometco bought WTVG (now WFUT-TV) in Newark, New Jersey, and in 1978 acquired WZZM-TV in Grand Rapids, Michigan. In 1977 Wometco launched a nationwide, over-the-air subscription television service called Wometco Home Theater, using WTVG as its flagship station.

Wometco expanded its non-entertainment holdings in 1955, with the opening of the Miami Seaquarium. It bought the Blue Circle hamburger chain, based in Knoxville, Tennessee in 1966, but sold it in 1974.

At one point, Wometco also owned the largest movie theaters chain in Puerto Rico.

== Transition, sales and breakup ==
Wometco co-founder Mitchell Wolfson died on January 28, 1983, of a heart attack, survived by two children: son Mitchell Wolfson, Jr. and daughter Frances Wolfson Cary. (Mitchell Wolfson was widowed when wife Frances Meyer Wolfson died in 1980; eldest son Louis Wolfson II died a year earlier.) The elder Wolfson's death was preceded by two heart attacks in February 1982 that also fueled speculation about the company's financial health as he remained chairman and was the largest Wometco stockholder right up to his death.

Contrary to public boasts made by the elder Wolfson of a "secret plan" to prevent Wometco from ever being sold off, there were no such plans for the company in his will nor was anyone designated by him as a succeeding chairman. The lack of any plan for Wometco led some within the company to believe that the elder Wolfson's true "secret plan" was never to leave. Bereft of any guidance by the elder Wolfson, the family and company board sold Wometco to merchant bank Kohlberg Kravis Roberts & Co. (KKR) on September 21, 1983, in a $1 billion (USD) leveraged buyout. At the time, it was both the largest corporate transaction in Florida history and a record amount for a leveraged buyout.

Wometco was taken private and split into two separate entities, one based around the six television stations and Wometco Home Theater, and the other centered around the 45 movie theaters, the Miami Seaquarium, the Citrus Tower, the vending machine division, the bottling/soft drink division and 47 cable television systems. Plans were immediately announced by KKR-appointed management to sell off the theaters and non-broadcasting entertainment properties which were seen as financial underperformers. The bulk of these assets were acquired by Wometco chief operating officer Arthur Hertz on April 29, 1985, while the bottling operations—one of the largest Coca-Cola bottlers in the nation—were sold separately.

The broadcast assets slowly began to be divested: WLOS-FM was sold to WISE radio in February 1984 for $1.75 million, while WZZM was sold to Price Communications in April 1985. KKR took control of Storer Communications, which was also based in Miami, in a $1.75 billion takeover after threats of liquidation by activist investors. This created a cross-ownership conflict with KKR in New York City, Miami and Atlanta, as the FCC recognized them as the owner of Storer's cable systems in Miami and WTVJ, Storer's cable systems in New York and WWHT/WSNL, and Wometco's cable systems in Atlanta and Storer's WAGA-TV. WWHT/WSNL adopted a music video format as "U68" following the closure of WHT, and the two stations were sold to Home Shopping Network as part of a larger, three-station deal worth $46 million.

WTVJ was initially sold to Lorimar-Telepictures for $405 million on May 21, 1986, as part of a larger $1.85 billion deal that included the Storer stations. After that purchase offer fell through, NBC's parent company General Electric bought the station on January 16, 1987, for $270 million, which initiated a complicated six-station network affiliation switch in both Miami and West Palm Beach on January 1, 1989. Wometco's cable systems were also divested.

In 1994, Cobb Theatres bought out the Wometco movie theatre chain. The Cobb chain would later merge into Regal Entertainment Group.

Wometco today still owns a franchise of Baskin-Robbins/Dunkin' Donuts stores in Miami, the Caribbean and Puerto Rico.

In March 2014, The Miami Seaquarium was sold to Palace Entertainment, a California-based company.

== Former stations ==
- Stations are arranged in alphabetical order by state and city of license.
- Two boldface asterisks appearing following a station's callsign (**) indicate a station built and signed on by either Wometco or a Wometco group.

Media market	State	Station	Purchased	Sold	Notes
Jacksonville	Florida	WTLV **	1957	1975	(Note: Known as WFGA-TV from 1957 until 1971.)
Miami–Fort Lauderdale	Florida	WTVJ **	1949	1987	(Note: Moved to channel 6 in 1995.)
Grand Rapids	Michigan	WZZM-TV	1978	1985	
New York City	New York	WWHT	1976	1986	(Note: Known as WTVG until 1979.)
New York City	New York	WSNL-TV	1980	1986	(Note: Satellite of WWHT.)
Asheville	North Carolina	WLOS	1958	1969	
Asheville	North Carolina	WLOS-FM	1958	1984	
Asheville	North Carolina	WLOS-TV	1958	1987	
Bellingham, WA–Seattle-Tacoma	Washington	KVOS-TV	1961	1984	
Madison	Wisconsin	WMTV	1957	1958	

== Bibliography ==
- Parks, Arva Moore. Miami: The Magic City. Tulsa, OK: Continental Heritage Press, 1981. ISBN 0-932986-17-X.
