= WXNY-FM =

Hispanic rhythmic radio station in New York City

- New York, New York; United States
- Broadcast area: New York metropolitan area
- Frequency: 96.3 MHz (HD Radio)
- Branding: La X 96.3

Programming
- Language: Spanish
- Format: Hispanic rhythmic
- Subchannels: HD2: TUDN Radio; HD3: Radio Russkaya Reklama (Russian music); HD4: Radio Freedom FM (Russian music)

Ownership
- Owner: Uforia Audio Network; (Univision Radio Stations Group, Inc.)
- Sister stations: Radio: WADO; TV: WFTY-DT; WFUT-DT; WXTV-DT

History
- First air date: November 26, 1939
- Former call signs: W59NY (1941–1943); WQXQ (1943–1948); WQXR-FM (1948–2009); WCAA (2009)

Technical information
- Licensing authority: FCC
- Facility ID: 29022
- Class: B
- ERP: 6,000 watts
- HAAT: 541.0 meters (1,774.9 ft)
- Transmitter coordinates: 40°44′54.36″N 73°59′8.36″W
- Translator: HD4: 104.7 W284BW (New York)

Links
- Public license information: Public file; LMS
- Webcast: Listen live (via iHeartRadio)
- Website: www.univision.com/radio/nueva-york-wxny-fm/; HD3: radio.rusrek.com; HD4: freedomfmradio.com

WXNY-FM (96.3 FM, La X 96.3) is a commercial radio station that broadcasts a Hispanic rhythmic format. It is licensed to New York, New York, and serves the New York metropolitan area. WXNY is owned by Uforia Audio Network and its transmitter is located at the Empire State Building in Midtown Manhattan.

== History ==
The station first came on the air on 105.9 FM in 1964, as WHBI. The call letters stood for original owners Hoyt Brothers Incorporated. In the 1980s, the station - by then property of Multicultural Broadcasting - went by the call letters WNWK, and aired leased-access ethnic programming. (This time the call letters stood for Newark, its city of license). In May 1998, Multicultural sold 105.9 FM to Heftel Broadcasting, a company at the time that owned Spanish language radio stations. Under the deal, Multicultural would be paid cash plus Heftel's second AM Radio station 930 WPAT which was running Radio Korea and other brokered programs. WPAT would drop Korea and pick up most of WNWK's brokered shows. Heftel's plans were to flip 105.9 to a Spanish Language mass appeal format of some sort.

=== Caliente 105.9 ===
On May 24, 1998, at midnight, 105.9 FM started playing hit Spanish music as "Caliente 105.9" ("Hot 105.9"), with the call letters WCAA. Heftel Broadcasting in a corporate deal became known as Hispanic Broadcasting.

=== 105.9 Latino Mix ===
In September 1999, the station changed its moniker to "105.9 Latino Mix" ("105.9 Latin Mix"). Eventually in another corporate deal Univision purchased Hispanic Broadcasting and entered into radio, making WCAA as well as WADO Univision owned. In February 2004, the station's owner, Univision Communications bought the 92.7 FM frequency in Garden City, New York which was the home of WLIR-FM and made it a western Long Island simulcast of 105.9 under the call letters WZAA. (While most New York City FM stations broadcast at 6,000 watts, 105.9 only has 600 watts of power, so 92.7 was used to give better coverage to Nassau County and Queens).

=== 105.9 La Kalle ===
On May 27, 2005, WCAA adapted a reggaeton format with the branding La Kalle, which is a fanciful spelling of La Calle, Spanish for "the street".

The station's HD2 station, which it was launched in 2006, aired the original "Caliente/Latino Mix" format (The Tropical music format).

In the summer of 2006, Univision launched the national affiliates page for its "La Kalle" stations around the United States, the Mini-Page also includes Quick-Links to live audio streams of other La Kalle stations.

Also in mid-2006, the station adopted the slogan "Yo Soy La Kalle!" ("I Am La Kalle!"), thus replacing the "Reggaeton y Mas" slogan from its format change. The new slogan was also part of a nationwide promotional campaign that Univision adopted for most of its other La Kalle affiliates.

In late December 2006, the station dropped the "Yo Soy La Kalle" slogan for the slogan "El Movimento Latino" (in English, "The Latino Movement"). In February 2007, the La Activaeda Block and SUBELO Midday Mix switched DJs: DJ Kazzanova ran the 5 p.m. mix programming, and station resident DJ, DJ SpinOne, mixed the Midday Mix; however, some of the DJs were still in the station mixing in club broadcasts and mix shows, notably DJ Presice, who was still doing the Saturday "The Show" block and DJ Rey-Mo who was mixing on La Kalle during select live club mix broadcasts. In mid-April 2007, the regular La Activaeta Block returned with the same schedule before the Kazzanova-SpinOne switch.

On January 11, 2007, Univision dropped the La Kalle simulcast by flipping 92.7 WZAA to a regional Mexican format, known as 92.7 Qué Buena.

In an unprecedented decision by station executives in mid-February 2007, the station started playing more of their old format as opposed to just Reggaeton 24/7. Some of the schedule changes were to blame for this format mix-up. The station aired a mix of Bachata and Salsa, with Reggaeton still being a primary format. These changes had no effect on the mix shows, but DJ Kazzanova played some Bachata/Salsa sometimes during his mix shifts (not "SUBELO Reggaeton Radio", his syndicated Reggaeton show airing on this station). Also, in a TV advertisement spot, the new format mix was shown when one of the Bachata songs was shown in the ad.

These changes culminated on January 17, 2008, when Luis Jimenez returned to New York airwaves with his nationally syndicated morning show, The Luis Jimenez Show, until his cancellation on July 16, 2014, after 7 years because of low ratings. The format was similar to the "Latino Mix" format that dominated the station before 2005.

=== Move from 105.9 FM to 96.3 FM as X96.3 ===
First logo as "X", used from 2009 to 2013

On July 14, 2009, it was announced that WCAA would move to the 96.3 frequency as a result of Univision radio buying the frequency. As a result, at 8 p.m. on October 8, 2009, classical WQXR-FM moved from 96.3 to 105.9, while WCAA moved to 96.3, dropped the La Kalle branding, and adopted a new name on October 15. It had been speculated the imaging for the station name would be "X96.3", as Univision had registered the domain name X963FM.com, as well as requesting the call letters WXNY. In addition, the RDS text data on car radios was displaying "96 X". The station began stunting with different genres of Spanish music and liners that pointed to the launch of the new branding, which took place on October 15, at 6 a.m. At that time, the station relaunched as "X 96.3" with call letters of WXNY-FM.

On May 19, 2014, the station shifted towards a hurban format. The station also updated its slogan to "¡Música Urbana y Mucho Más!"

On November 9, 2016, the station shifted to a Spanish rhythmic AC format with "Super Hits: El Sonido de Hoy" slogan.

On September 19, 2018, the station updated its slogan to "El Ritmo de New York".
