= Wometco Home Theater =

Defunct subscription television service serving the New York City area

- Country: United States
- Broadcast area: New York metropolitan area
- Headquarters: Fairfield, New Jersey

Programming
- Language: English

Ownership
- Owner: Wometco Enterprises

History
- Launched: 1977 (49 years ago)
- Replaced: Wometco Broadcasting Network (October 1, 1957-February 29, 1977)
- Closed: 1985 (41 years ago)
- Replaced by: SelecTV (1985-1989)
- Former names: BTVision (March 1, 1977-August 9, 1977)

Wometco Home Theater (WHT) was an early pay television service in the New York City area that was owned by Miami-based Wometco Enterprises, which owned several major network affiliates in mid-sized media markets and its flagship WTVJ in Miami (then a CBS affiliate on channel 4, now an NBC owned-and-operated station on channel 6). The signals were broadcast beginning in August 1977 on WWHT-TV (channel 68) and later on WSNL-TV (channel 67) out of Smithtown, New York.

== Overview ==
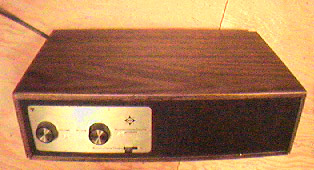
Wometco Home Theater descrambling box.

Initially subscribers paid $15 for a set-top descrambling box that allowed subscribers to view channel 68's scrambled television signals (a later addressable, 2-channel version of this descrambler was developed under vice president of engineering, Alex MacDonald). The service was similar to Home Box Office (HBO), but a Wometco executive told The New York Times that WHT was more likely to select films with a particular interest to the New York City area. Wometco also targeted areas that were not yet served by cable television (although parts of Manhattan had cable television service as early as 1971, the vast majority of the five boroughs of New York City would not begin receiving cable television service until 1988).

Programming consisted of 12 features a month, including movies and entertainment specials. In addition, select home games of the NHL's New York Islanders were broadcast live from the Nassau Veterans Memorial Coliseum. Each program was repeated five times during the month. During the daytime, WWHT was a small commercial television station. The station was originally going to be a general entertainment station with shows that independents WNEW-TV (channel 5), WOR-TV (channel 9) and WPIX (channel 11) passed on. However, the costs were too high to acquire such programs so the station broadcast only a couple hours of low budget syndicated shows, The Uncle Floyd Show, public affairs programs, religious programs, stock market reports, and minority-interest and foreign language programs. In 1980, WHT began programming a movie from 10:30 a.m. to 1 p.m. as well, later adding the adult-themed late night service "Nightcap" with its black cat logo.

In the fall of 1980, Wometco Enterprises brought in a new management team. The team consisted of Harold Brownstein as the new president and Robert Borders as vice president of marketing, both of whom had previously worked together at a major BTB direct marketing company. Having operated at $1 million plus loss for over four years, this team turned the operation profitable within 18 months. This was accomplished by consolidating numerous satellite offices/functions into the company's headquarters in Fairfield, New Jersey, producing a bi-monthly program guide (instead of monthly), significantly reducing printing and postage costs, and implementing direct response marketing concepts into the company's multimillion-dollar local television ads, so that the company could determine which markets and promotions generated sales, instead of just awareness.

WHT also employed an MATV division in an effort to expand their viewership by partnering with the real estate community to provide the service to buildings and apartment complexes, using a facility's pre-existing master antenna system.

In the spring of 1983, WHT also began operating 20 hours a day (increasing its subscription rate to $21/month), with only two hours a day of religious and public affairs shows seen on WWHT. Uncle Floyd moved off Channel 68 and onto NJN. However, the station marketed WHT as 24 hours a day, and the two hours of religious and public affairs shows were positioned as part of WHT's lineup. This block of programming was also unscrambled. Also, another two hours of children's shows were marketed as part of WHT, but also unscrambled. It was at this time that Wometco Home Theater and Wometco Enterprises were sold to the private investment firm of Kohlberg Kravis Roberts & Co.

By 1984, Wometco Home Theater had ceased its own programming and began carrying programs from California-based pay television service SelecTV. Finally, after losing more and more subscribers over the next two years, WHT ceased operations in March 1986. WSNL and WWHT then switched to an all-music format named "U68", similar to MTV, which lasted for about 8 months before both stations were purchased by an affiliate company of the Home Shopping Network. The stations are now owned-and-operated stations of the Spanish-language network UniMás.

== List of Wometco Home Theater affiliates ==
Station	Channel	FCC City of License	Affiliation Years	Notations
WTVG, 1977–1979; WWHT, 1979-1985 (now WFUT-DT)	68	Newark, New Jersey	1977-1985	Flagship station for the WHT Network serving the Five Boroughs of New York City, Northern and Central New Jersey as well as part of Fairfield County in Connecticut where reception of WSNL's signal was weak or non-existent.
WRBV (now WUVP-DT)	65	Vineland, New Jersey	1981-1985	A rimshot into Philadelphia from the southeast, serving the New Jersey part of the market and the city proper well, but weak in the northern and western suburbs.
W60AI (now WDYJ-LD)	60	New York City	1977-1985	Simulcast of WTVG/WWHT's signal, serving areas of New York City where reception of channel 68 was poor.
WSNL (now WFTY-DT)	67	Smithtown, New York	1980-1985	Simulcast of WTVG/WWHT's signal, serving Nassau and Suffolk counties on Long Island as well as part of Fairfield County in Connecticut where reception of WTVG/WWHT's signal to Fairfield County was weak or non-existent.

== See also ==
- ON TV, an over-the-air subscription service that served Chicago, Cincinnati, Dallas/Fort Worth, Detroit, Fort Lauderdale, Los Angeles, Phoenix and Salem/Portland.
- PRISM, an over-the-air and cable television subscription service that served Southeastern Pennsylvania, Southern New Jersey, Delaware and the Delmarva Peninsula.
- SelecTV, an over-the-air subscription service that served Los Angeles, Milwaukee and Philadelphia and later the Wometco Home Theater territories after WHT ceased its own programming.
- Spectrum, an over-the-air subscription service that served Chicago and was a direct competitor to ON TV.
- Super TV, an over-the-air subscription service that served Washington, D.C., the Capital and Central regions of Maryland and Northern Virginia.
