= WXTV-DT =

Television station in Paterson, New Jersey

- Paterson, New Jersey; New York, New York; United States
- City: Paterson, New Jersey
- Channels: Digital: 26 (UHF), shared with WFUT-DT; Virtual: 41
- Branding: Univision 41 Nueva York; Noticias N+ Univision Nueva York (newscasts)

Programming
- Affiliations: 41.1: Univision; for others, see § Subchannels

Ownership
- Owner: TelevisaUnivision; (WXTV License Partnership, G.P.)
- Sister stations: WFUT-DT; WFTY-DT; WADO; WXNY-FM

History
- First air date: August 4, 1968
- Former call signs: WXTV (1968–2009)
- Former channel numbers: Analog: 41 (UHF, 1968–2009); Digital: 40 (UHF, until 2018), 30 (UHF, 2018–2019); Translators: W35AB Philadelphia; W61AH Hartford, CT

Technical information
- Licensing authority: FCC
- Facility ID: 74215
- ERP: 215 kW
- HAAT: 397 m (1,302 ft)
- Transmitter coordinates: 40°44′54″N 73°59′9″W

Links
- Public license information: Public file; LMS
- Website: www.univision.com/local/nueva-york-wxtv

WXTV-DT (channel 41) is a television station licensed to Paterson, New Jersey, United States, serving the New York City market. It is one of two flagship stations of the Spanish-language network Univision (alongside WLTV-DT in Miami–Fort Lauderdale), and is owned and operated by TelevisaUnivision. Under common ownership with Newark-licensed UniMás outlet WFUT-DT (channel 68) and Smithtown, New York–licensed True Crime Network affiliate WFTY-DT (channel 67), the three stations share studio facilities on Frank W. Burr Boulevard in Teaneck, New Jersey; WXTV-DT and WFUT-DT share transmitter facilities at the Empire State Building in Midtown Manhattan.

WXTV's programming is simulcast to Long Island on WFTY's third digital subchannel (67.3) from its transmitter in Middle Island, New York.

== History ==
=== Channel... 37? ===
In 1962, the Federal Communications Commission (FCC) received two applications for the channel 37 allocation belonging to Paterson, New Jersey—one from the Spanish International Broadcasting Corporation, which at the time only owned two stations, and another from Progress Broadcasting, owner of WHOM (1480 AM). Additionally, use of channel 37 in Paterson had been contemplated for a potential educational station for northern New Jersey. However, even as the channel had picked up a further two interested parties by April 1963, it was not a broadcaster at all that drove the proceedings. The Vermilion River Observatory in Danville, Illinois, a radio astronomy facility, objected to any channel 37 facility being built—the channel having been allocated to 19 communities across the country—because their observatory was designed to detect signals in the 608–614 MHz range, coinciding with channel 37; using these frequencies, the observatory could detect specific types of radiation that existed at no other wavelength. The FCC, arguing that there was no other available channel for a station in Paterson, proposed initially to award no channel 37 station within 600 miles (970 km) of Danville and that all stations would have overnight broadcasts curtailed. An editorial in The New York Times called on the FCC to reserve the channel on a national basis for radio astronomy.

In October 1963, the FCC opted to devote channel 37 entirely to radio astronomy uses until at least 1974 and announced it would allocate another channel to Paterson. The four channel 37 applicants—Spanish International Broadcasting Corporation, Progress Broadcasting, Bartell Broadcasters, and Trans-Tel—would have to wait until the FCC assigned another channel to Paterson. Originally, 66 was proposed, but by 1965, channel 41 had instead been assigned.

=== WXTV signs on the air ===
Trans-Tel, which proposed a station airing programming for the tri-state area's Spanish-speaking and Black communities, came out the winner in a settlement that also saw Bartell drop out and Spanish International get the option to acquire 50 percent of the permit. This option was exercised in 1967.

Initially planned to broadcast from the Empire State Building, construction was sped up when the FCC allowed the station—taking the call letters WXTV—to move its transmitter to the Cities Service Building until the World Trade Center was completed, becoming the first television station to use the mast and first broadcast station since 1950. (Note: An article in The Record claims it will be the "first located on this building"; it had last been used by WGYN, an FM station that closed in 1950.) The station went on the air August 4, 1968, from studios at 641 Main Street in Paterson, a property it leased from former mayor Frank X. Graves Jr. The station focused on filmed programs from Mexico and Puerto Rico at the outset, though it also aired local news, and some English-language programming, primarily public affairs material for North Jersey, including a news wrap-up and election debates. Additionally, because the electricity supply to the Cities Service Building meant the transmitter could only be powered when the air conditioning and elevator systems were off, channel 41 could only broadcast at first in the evenings.

=== Tower woes ===
For several years, the location of the transmitter was a hot-button issue. Rene Anselmo, one of the founders of the Spanish International Network, claimed that when WXTV initially inquired as to space at the Empire State Building, it was told it would have to sign a 20-year lease. Because all of the other stations were scheduled to move to the World Trade Center, it opted to wait at the Cities Service Building. However, when the center neared completion, it began causing reception issues for WXTV, particularly because the Cities Service transmitter was closer to the towers than the other stations at the Empire State Building. The station blamed the Port of New York Authority for poor reception and implored viewers to complain to Austin Tobin; the Port Authority complained that the intention of channel 41's actions was to try and move its transmitter to the WTC. Claiming that the Port Authority was stalling on prior agreements to move the stations to the WTC, WXTV ran a full-page advertisement in the Daily News imploring viewers to "Wake Up!" and declaring that "The Port Authority is killing your TV reception...and doesn't give a damn!". It also threatened to sue the Port Authority; Anselmo wrote to FCC commissioner Robert E. Lee and the governors of New York and New Jersey asking for their intercession.

The station was successful in getting FCC approval to operate from the World Trade Center in 1974, but delays continued for years. In April 1980, the Port Authority finally reached an agreement to allow WXTV and its direct competitor, WNJU-TV, to operate from its antenna site on the north tower. However, further pushbacks by the Port Authority over radiation concerns for visitors to the south tower's 107th-story observation deck led Anselmo to start a hunger strike in an RV parked at the base of the towers in May 1980. Finally, in June, an agreement was approved to allow WXTV and WNJU to broadcast from the tower.

=== Growth ===
In 1978, after ten years based in its city of license, WXTV announced it would move its studios to Secaucus, New Jersey, where they were consolidated with the station's Manhattan advertising offices. The move would save money and pay for the relocation of the transmitter to the World Trade Center. Meanwhile, as SIN became a pioneer in the use of television translators to extend its reach, WXTV soon began to spread outside of the New York City area. On May 3, 1980, a channel 35 translator went on the air in Philadelphia, which was followed by a second translator on channel 61 for Hartford, Connecticut, the next month.

WXTV was not the only Spanish-language TV station for the New York market—WNJU was already on the air—and the two began a healthy competition for viewers. However, the mix of programs on SIN and Univision, which emphasized Mexican novelas, sometimes hurt WXTV in a market with more Dominicans, Puerto Ricans, and Cubans. This allowed WNJU to beat WXTV at times.

In the late 1990s, WXTV made substantial strides in the general-market ratings. In February 1999, it topped WWOR-TV in total-day ratings, a historic first in New York; despite this, it had just $44 million in advertising revenue compared to $155 million for WWOR.

The September 11, 2001, terror attacks on the World Trade Center did not affect WXTV's over-the-air signal, as WXTV's transmitter is located at the Empire State Building. The station had filed in 1989 to return there from the World Trade Center and completed the move in 1992. WXTV and WCBS-TV (channel 2), which had a full-powered backup transmitter at the Empire State Building, were the only major New York City stations whose over-the-air signals were not disrupted. For a time until the other English stations could re-establish emergency transmission bases at Empire or the Armstrong Tower, WXTV's anchors reported in both languages for viewers without pay access to local English stations; the station had also done so when the towers were bombed in 1993.

== Newscasts ==
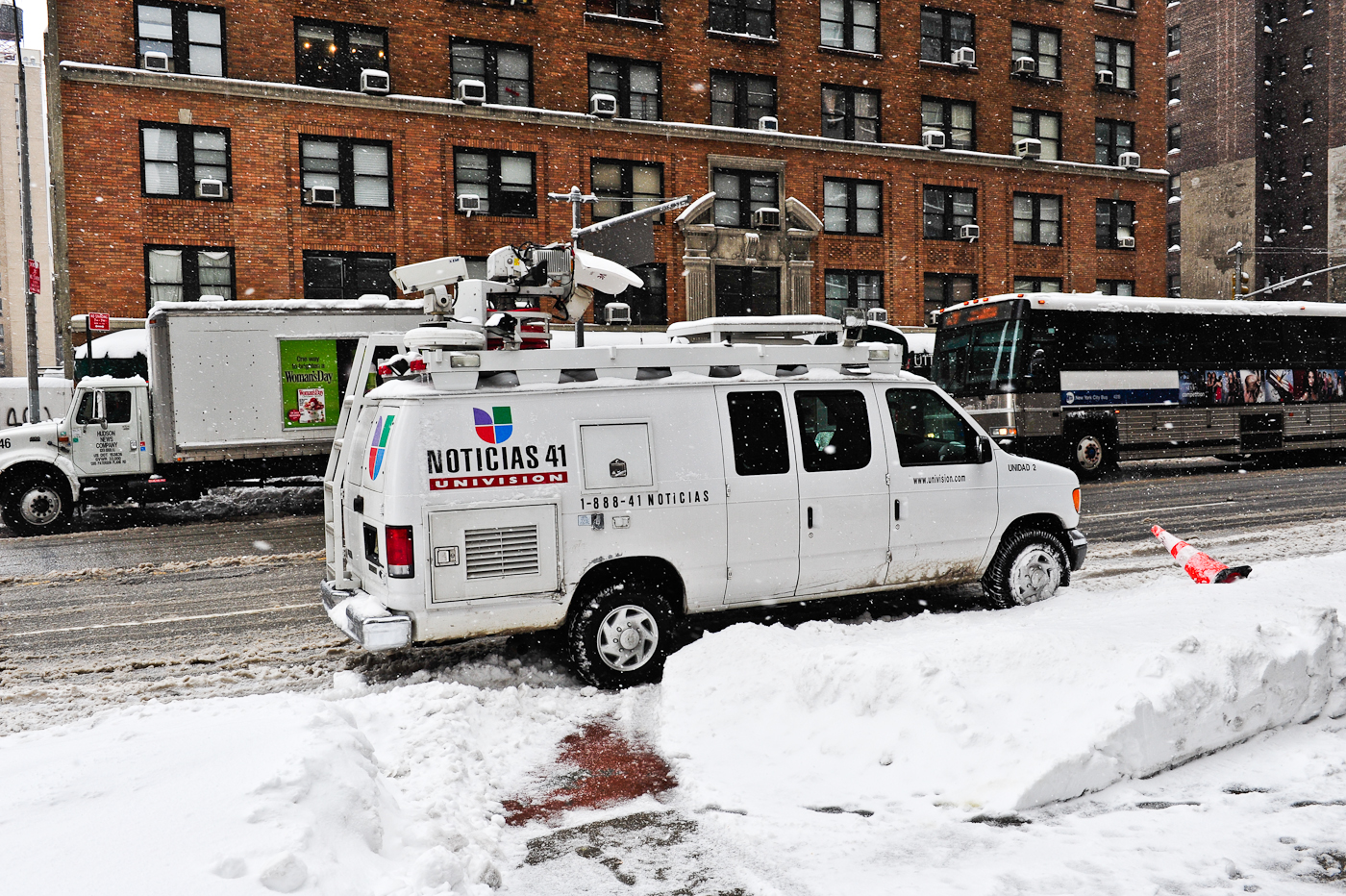
A WXTV news van in 2010

Local news began with the station, originally in the form of half-hour newscasts at 7 and 11 p.m. (later changed to 6 and 11). From 1981 to 1985, Enrique Gratas was WXTV's news director. In 1999, an hour-long morning newscast was added to the station's evening news broadcasts, the first Spanish-language morning news program in the New York market. In addition to the newscasts, the station produces news updates for Optimum's News 12 Networks on weekdays.

Since the late 1990s, as the Hispanic population in New York has grown, WXTV's ratings have grown to become competitive with the market's English-language stations. WXTV won the July 2008 sweeps period and also became the first Spanish-language television station to win all three evening slots (local newscasts at 6 and 11 and the national news at 6:30 p.m.). WXTV's 6 p.m. newscast was also No. 1 among the 25–54 demographic, followed by WABC-TV, WCBS-TV, WNJU, WNYW and WNBC. WXTV's 6 p.m. newscast ended the 2011 calendar year as the number-one newscast in that timeslot in the entire United States in any language among adults 18–49.

In 2020, the late newscast, Solo a las Once (Only at 11), was retooled with an in-depth format.

=== Notable current on-air staff ===
- Adriana Vargas – weeknight anchor
- Rafael Bello – weekday meteorologist and entertainment anchor

=== Notable former on-air staff ===
- María Celeste Arrarás
- Daisy Fuentes
- Denisse Oller
- Rafael Pineda (retired in 2013)

== Technical information ==
=== Subchannels ===
WFUT-DT and WXTV-DT broadcast from the Empire State Building.

Subchannels of WFUT-DT and WXTV-DT
License	Subchannel	Res.	Short name	Programming
WFUT-DT	68.1	720p	WFUT-DT	UniMás
WFUT-DT	68.2	480i	CRIME	True Crime Network (WFTY-DT)
WFUT-DT	68.3	480i	GetTV	Great (4:3)
WXTV-DT	41.1	720p	WXTV-DT	Univision
WXTV-DT	41.2	480i	MSGold	MovieSphere Gold
WXTV-DT	41.3	480i	BT2	Infomercials
WXTV-DT	11.2	480i	Antenna	Antenna TV (WPIX)
WXTV-DT	11.4	480i	REWIND	Rewind TV (WPIX)

Simulcast of subchannels of another station
Broadcast on behalf of another station

Subchannel broadcast with MPEG-4 video

Coverage areas of WFUT–WXTV (red) and WFTY-DT (blue). WFUT–WXTV, from the Empire State Building, serves New York City, the Hudson Valley, and northern New Jersey. WFTY-DT, from Middle Island, serves much of the southern Connecticut coast and eastern Long Island. The signals overlap over southwestern Connecticut and west-central Long Island.

=== Analog-to-digital conversion ===
WXTV ended regular programming on its analog signal, over UHF channel 41, on June 12, 2009, as part of the federally mandated transition from analog to digital television; the station's digital signal remained on its pre-transition UHF channel 40, using virtual channel 41.

In the incentive auction, WXTV's spectrum was sold for $198,965,211, and the station's license was consolidated onto one channel with co-owned WFUT.
