= Walter Reade =

American businessman

Walter Reade Sr. and Walter Reade Jr. were an American father and son who had extensive careers in the United States motion picture industry.

== Walter Reade Sr. ==
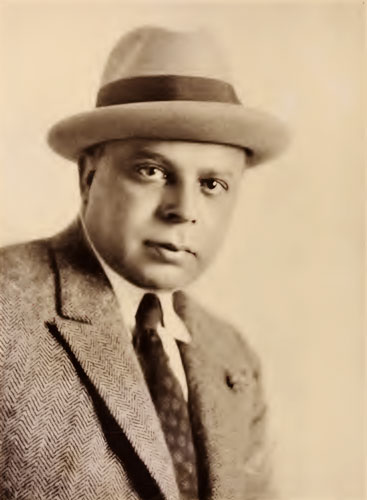
Walter Reade, Sr. in a 1927 publicity photo for Reade Theatre Enterprises.

Walter Reade Sr. (1884–1952) was the man behind a chain of theatres which grew from a single theatre in Asbury Park, New Jersey to a chain of forty theatres and drive-ins in New Jersey, New York and neighboring states that lasted into the mid-seventies. Known as the “Showman of The Shore,” his name was associated with big, beautifully kept single movie theatres of Hollywood’s golden age. He lived in Deal, New Jersey, and considered Asbury Park the home base of his organization. He had six theatres there: The Mayfair, St. James, Lyric, Ocean, Paramount and Savoy. He soon became embroiled in fighting the corruption in Asbury Park from 1946 onward after he started a newspaper that had some unfavorable things to say about his adversaries.

== Walter Reade Jr. ==
Walter Reade Jr. (1916–1973) was the President and Board Chairman of the Walter Reade Organization, which owned and operated theatres in Manhattan, New Jersey, Boston and upstate New York. As the son of the company founder, Walter Reade Jr. served as an executive in the company. When his father died in the early 1950s, he assumed control of the company, and continued in that position until his death. In addition to its movie theatre operations, the Walter Reade Organization owned and operated television station WRTV in Asbury Park, New Jersey, between 1954 and 1955.

== The Walter Reade Organization ==
Reade Jr. started Continental Film Distributors in 1954 to distribute foreign films in the USA.

In 1961, Walter Reade acquired Sterling Television, renaming it to Reade-Sterling and then as the Walter Reade Organization in 1966. The company posted a major financial loss in 1964, due to the failure of its foreign film releases with the American public (the company had been responsible for issuing most of the films of Jacques Tati, and for also releasing the Canadian film The Luck of Ginger Coffey).

The Walter Reade Organization also distributed and sometimes financed foreign films for showing in American theatres and sold packages of dubbed foreign films for American television. The company financed Ulysses (1967). Reade was described by Joseph Strick, the director of that film, as "a big, bluff man who wore a fresh carnation every day".

Reade declared "You can't take major awards to the bank" and began a program of more commercial releases such as a double feature of the British Hot Enough for June retitled Agent 8 3/4 to make it sound more like a James Bond spoof and the Japanese Ghidorah, the Three-Headed Monster in 1965. Reade also presented Behind the Great Wall, in "AromaRama", at the DeMille Theater in New York. The theater's air conditioning system was used to circulate various scents to provide an olfactory experience in addition to the sights and sounds. By three weeks, AromaRama beat a competing system, Scent of Mystery (1960), in Smell-O-Vision. Reade's biggest success was releasing and exploiting Night of the Living Dead (1968).

== Walter Reade cinemas ==
The firm also owned the Charles Cinema in Boston, which opened in April 1967 and closed in December 1976. Major engagements included Easy Rider (1969) and Star Wars (1977). The space was later operated by other exhibitors, but finally closed in 1994. In 1969, the company's flagship Ziegfeld Theatre in New York City opened.

At its peak in the mid- to late-1960s, the Walter Reade Organization also operated two flagship foreign film movie theaters in Beverly Hills, California. The Beverly Hills Music Hall on Wilshire Boulevard was the exclusive exhibitor in the region of the 1969 American release of the Russian film production of War and Peace. The six-hour epic, directed by Sergei Bondarchuk, was treated as a prestige product, shown in two parts on two separate days, requiring "hard ticket" roadshow treatment and separate management handling the advance reservations. All the motion picture industry elites turned out for the several months of that engagement, including Katharine Hepburn, Warren Beatty and Julie Christie, Mike Nichols, Joanne Woodward, and scores of others. Theater staffers were required to wear Russian tunics for this engagement, and the doormen wore full-length Cossack coats, fur hats and accessories. The second Walter Reade cinema in Beverly Hills was the Beverly Canon, which also exhibited the company's licensed foreign films and was the site of world premiere screenings that included Peter Bogdanovich's Targets.

Sheldon Gunsberg later took over the company from Reade when he was killed in a skiing accident in Switzerland (St. Moritz). The company filed for bankruptcy in 1977, emerging four years later. Columbia Pictures purchased 81% of the organization in 1981, buying the company completely in 1985, but later sold it to the Cineplex Odeon Corporation on June 26, 1987.
