= WDYJ-LD =

Television station in New York City

- New York, New York; United States
- Channels: Digital: 33 (UHF), shared with WDYA-LD, to move to 23 (UHF); Virtual: 60

Programming
- Affiliations: 60.1: Diya TV; 60.3: [Blank]

Ownership
- Owner: Major Market Broadcasting; (Major Market Broadcasting of New York Inc.)
- Sister stations: WDYA-LD

History
- First air date: 1977 (first incarnation)
- Former call signs: W60AI (1977–2011); W41DO-D (2011–2023); W33ET-D (2023–2024)
- Former channel numbers: Analog: 60 (UHF, 1977–2011); Digital: 41 (UHF, 2011–2023)
- Former affiliations: Independent (via WTVG, WWHT 1977–1986); HSN (2004–2010, 2011–2013; via WHSE 1986–1989); America's Store (1989–2004); Dark (2010–2011); HSN2 (2013–2023)

Technical information
- Licensing authority: FCC
- Facility ID: 60554
- Class: LD
- ERP: 15 kW
- HAAT: 300.3 m (985 ft)
- Transmitter coordinates: 40°44′54″N 73°59′9″W

Links
- Public license information: LMS
- Website: Diya TV website

WDYJ-LD (channel 60) is a low-power television station in New York City, affiliated with Diya TV. It is owned by Major Market Broadcasting alongside WDYA-LD (channel 10). Through a channel sharing agreement, the two stations transmit using WDYJ-LD's spectrum from an antenna atop the Empire State Building in midtown Manhattan.

== History ==
=== As W60AI (1977–2011) ===
This station was signed on over UHF channel 60 with alpha-numeric call sign W60AI in 1977 as a translator of WTVG (channel 68), a Newark, New Jersey–based independent station, with a transmitter atop 2 World Trade Center. At the time of its launch, it was branded as 60 for New York. WTVG later became WWHT, incorporating pay TV subscription service Wometco Home Theater into its programming, and later programmed music videos after WHT ceased operations in 1985. It switched to HSN in 1986 and the call sign was changed to WHSE, rebranding as "TV68" the next year.

W60AI remained a WHSE translator until 1989 when it changed to Home Shopping Spree, later renamed to America's Store in 1997, to increase that network's penetration in parts of Nassau and Kings counties, where they didn't have cable coverage. HSN remained available via WHSE for another five years, and then on WXNY-LP after WHSE was sold to Univision Communications and became WFUT. After September 11, 2001, W60AI moved its transmitter to the Citigroup Building in Long Island City, Queens. It has since been relicensed to operate from the Bloomberg Tower at 725 Lexington Avenue in Manhattan. In 2004, the station swapped affiliations with WXNY and returned to HSN, this time as a satellite repeater. Analog W60AI left the air March 1, 2010. HSN moved to WNYN-LD5 in April 2010. In February 2011, W60AI signed on its digital signal on channel 41. On March 8, 2011, the call sign was changed to W41DO-D.

=== As W41DO-D (2011–2023) ===
From March 8, 2011, to around March 19, 2011, W41DO-D was airing HSN2, which is available online, and was displayed as 41.2 for a time. Since March 19, 2011, W41DO-D has been airing HSN on virtual channel 60.1, which is also carried by WNYN-LD5. On April 7, 2011, 60.2 was launched and is now airing HSN2. Sometime in September 2012, HSN's programming on WNYN 39.9 was replaced with other programming. Around 2013, HSN moved to WPXN-DT6, thus dropping HSN for the second time, replacing HSN2 as primary affiliate since America's Store was added in 1989 as Home Shopping Spree. W41DO is currently not on the air due to its signal loss on both 60.1 and 60.2. Only a telephone number is shown, which is no longer in use. The station returns few weeks later, however it went silent as a construction permit was filed to move from channel 41 to channel 33. The following year they applied yet again to channel 2 which CBS flagship WCBS-TV currently use as a virtual channel.

On February 10, 2021, Major Market Broadcasting (Ravi Kapur, President) purchased W41DO for $1,503,410, though it continued to operate as HSN2 through the licensee change. The new change in ownership marks the third time and the first to be owned outright with Ventura television as a license holder. Ventura Television sold the entire licensed to Major Market Broadcasting of New York Inc ending 35 year ownership of HSN, which was then a parent company of Silver King Broadcasting.

=== As W33ET-D (2023–2024) ===
On April 14, 2023, the station moved from channel 41 to channel 33, and accordingly the call-sign was changed to W33ET-D. Thus, two years after Major Market Broadcasting brought the station from Ventana, the format was switched to Diya TV. This officially ended a 37 year run as a home shopping format from HSN, the longest of any low power station carrying a home shopping format. The station briefly went dark.

=== As WDYJ-LD (2024–present) ===
On May 11, 2024, the station changed its call sign to WDYJ-LD. The primary stream (60-1) is Diya TV; It has one subchannel (60-3) Novelisima. Simultaneously, the call sign for co-owned and guest station W32EI-D was also changed to WDYA-LD, which reflects that station's Diya TV primary stream.

== Subchannels ==
Subchannels of WDYJ-LD and WDYA-LD
License	Subchannel	Res.	Short name	Programming
WDYJ-LD	60.1	480i	DiyaTV	Diya TV
WDYJ-LD	60.3	480i	MasShow	[Blank]
WDYA-LD	10.1	480i	Diya-TV	Diya TV
WDYA-LD	10.4	480i	OANPlus	One America Plus
WDYA-LD	10.5	480i	AWEPlus	AWE Plus
WDYA-LD	10.6	480i	Heartld	Heartland
WDYA-LD	10.7	480i	Retro	Retro TV
