= WUVG-DT =

Television station in Athens, Georgia, United States

- Athens–Atlanta, Georgia; United States
- City: Athens, Georgia
- Channels: Digital: 18 (UHF); Virtual: 34
- Branding: Univision 34 Atlanta; Noticias 34 Atlanta (newscasts); UniMás Atlanta (34.2)

Programming
- Affiliations: 34.1: Univision; 34.2: UniMás; for others, see § Subchannels

Ownership
- Owner: TelevisaUnivision; (Univision Atlanta LLC)

History
- First air date: April 18, 1989
- Former call signs: WNGM-TV (1989–1999); WHOT-TV (1999–2001); WUVG (2001–2003); WUVG-TV (2004–2009)
- Former channel numbers: Analog: 34 (UHF, 1989–2009); Digital: 48 (UHF, until 2019)
- Former affiliations: Independent (1987–1993, 1999–2002); HSN (1993–1999); Fox Kids (secondary, 2000–2002)
- Call sign meaning: Univision Georgia

Technical information
- Licensing authority: FCC
- Facility ID: 48813
- ERP: 1,000 kW
- HAAT: 328 m (1,076 ft)
- Transmitter coordinates: 33°48′26″N 84°20′22″W
- Translator(s): 35 (UHF) Athens

Links
- Public license information: Public file; LMS
- Website: www.univision.com/local/atlanta-wuvg

WUVG-DT (channel 34) is a television station licensed to Athens, Georgia, United States, broadcasting the Spanish-language Univision and UniMás networks to the Atlanta area. Owned and operated by TelevisaUnivision, the station maintains studios on Peachtree Road NE in the Buckhead section of Atlanta and a primary transmitter in North Druid Hills.

WUVG-DT was established as WNGM-TV, a station serving the Athens area, in 1989. Its focus broadened to Atlanta in the 1990s as the station was sold several times, airing home shopping, music videos, and then an independent format under the ownership of USA Broadcasting. It switched to Univision in January 2002, making it the first Spanish-language station in the market.

== History ==
=== WNGM-TV ===
The station went on air on April 18, 1989, as WNGM-TV, with the call sign standing for "North Georgia Mountains". Initially the station ran a general entertainment format with cartoons, classic and recent sitcoms, blocks of country music programming, old movies and syndicated first-run shows; it also aired a local newscast and magazine program focusing on north Georgia.

WNGM-TV was owned by a company including the final two applicants for the channel: Georgia Mountain Corporation and Sunbelt Television, Inc., which merged their bids in 1985 and won the construction permit. Its transmitter was located 60 miles (97 km) away from Atlanta, reaching Athens with a grade A signal while sending a very weak signal into eastern metro Atlanta. As a result, many syndicators sold the rights for shows that were already on the Atlanta stations to WNGM. The station provided an alternative to viewers in areas which had moderate VHF reception and poor UHF reception from Atlanta; Clarke County had a cable penetration rate of 83 percent, 30 points above the national average.

NGM Television Partners, the licensee, sold the station for $10 million in 1996 to Whitehead Media, which the next year formalized a time brokerage agreement under which Paxson Communications Corporation began operating channel 34. However, Paxson opted the next year to divest itself of extra stations in markets where it controlled more than one, such as Atlanta, where it owned WPXA-TV. The $73.5 million sale by Paxson of the operating rights and by Whitehead of the licenses for WNGM-TV and WOAC in Canton, Ohio, to Global Broadcasting Systems, Inc., was terminated a month later when the buyer failed to post an escrow deposit.

From 1996 until September 1, 1997, WNGM-TV aired Paxson's Infomall TV infomercial network, then switching to separate but similar home shopping programming, which was an issue at play in a cable carriage dispute with MediaOne over whether it had to be placed on a series of major Atlanta-area cable systems.

=== "Hotlanta 34" ===
In 1998, USA Broadcasting acquired WNGM for $50 million. It was part of a larger deal between Paxson and USA that allowed Paxson-owned stations in New Orleans and Memphis to make early exits from affiliation contracts with the Home Shopping Network, gave Paxson a station serving Portland, Oregon, and put USA Broadcasting in every top 10 market but Detroit. After the USA acquisition, the home shopping programming was dropped and replaced with music videos from The Box—which led the FCC to greenlight the station's push for must-carry in the Atlanta area that August.

In November 1999, WNGM was the third of four USAB stations after Miami's WAMI-TV to convert to USAB's new "CityVision" general entertainment format and became "Hotlanta 34" under new WHOT-TV call letters. The centerpiece of the plan was a three-year contract for the rights to telecast Atlanta Hawks basketball. The move was made after WATL (channel 36) opted not to renew its deal because of the expanding program offerings of The WB. However, after the format failed to take off where it was introduced and the company registered operating losses of $62 million in 2000, Diller opted to sell the stations to Univision in 2001.

=== Univision Georgia ===
While some of the stations were used to start Telefutura, a second network, the purchase gave Univision its first ever broadcast outlet in Atlanta, where the Latino population had grown by 362 percent during the 1990s. Under new WUVG call letters, channel 34 changed to Spanish-language programming on January 14, 2002. While local news was not immediately added, WUVG began producing a public affairs program in Spanish, Nuestra Georgia (Our Georgia), the first such program on Atlanta television since 1997.

== News operation ==
WUVG launched its news department in April 2011, with two daily half-hour evening newscasts at 6 and 11 p.m.—branded as Noticias 34 Atlanta (News 34 Atlanta)—anchored by Amanda Ramirez (now at WLII-DT) and Gianncarlo Cifuentes. The station also maintained a partnership with WGCL-TV (now WANF) for news coverage.

The station's other local program is a weekend newsmagazine, Conexión Fin de Semana.

== Technical information ==
=== Subchannels ===
The station's signal is multiplexed:

Subchannels of WUVG-DT
Subchannel	Res.	Short name	Programming
34.1	720p	WUVG-DT	Univision
34.2	720p	UNM-HD	UniMás
34.3	480i	GetTV	Great (4:3)
34.4	480i	Nosey	Nosey
34.5	480i	ShopLC	Shop LC
34.6	480i	MVSGLD	MovieSphere Gold
34.7	480i	BT2	Infomercials

Subchannel broadcast with MPEG-4 video

=== Translator ===
WUVG-DT maintains a digital replacement translator, which enhances channel 34's coverage in the city of license, Athens.

City of license	Call sign	Channel	ERP	HAAT	Facility ID	Transmitter coordinates
Athens	WUVG-DT (DRT)	35	13.5 kW	111.3 m (365 ft)	48813	33°59′36″N 83°24′56″W

=== Analog-to-digital conversion ===
WUVG shut down its analog signal, over UHF channel 34, on June 12, 2009, as part of the federally mandated transition from analog to digital television. The station's digital signal remained on its pre-transition UHF channel 48, using virtual channel 34; it was later repacked to channel 18.
