= WRTV (New Jersey) =

Television station in Asbury Park, New Jersey

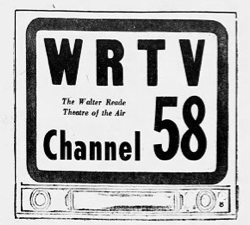
- Asbury Park, New Jersey; United States
- Channels: Analog: 58 (UHF)

Programming
- Network: Independent

Ownership
- Owner: Walter Reade Organization; (Atlantic Video Corporation)

History
- First air date: January 22, 1954
- Last air date: April 1, 1955
- Call sign meaning: Walter Reade Television

Technical information
- ERP: 17.1 kW
- HAAT: 134 m (440 ft)
- Transmitter coordinates: 40°17′31″N 74°02′56″W

WRTV (channel 58) was an independent television station in Asbury Park, New Jersey, United States. Owned by the Walter Reade Organization, it broadcast from January 22, 1954, to April 1, 1955, in hopes of securing a VHF channel for the station that never came. In the 1960s, Reade attempted to move the unbuilt station from channel 58 in Asbury Park to channel 68 in Newark, which was treated as an application for a new station; granted in 1970, Reade sold the permit before it went on air.

== History ==
In October 1952, the Federal Communications Commission (FCC) granted a construction permit to the Atlantic Video Corporation to build a new UHF television station on channel 58 in Asbury Park. The company was headed by Walter Reade Jr., and proposed to place the studios in Reade's Savoy Theatre, one in a chain of cinemas he owned. Originally assigned the call letters WCEE, the construction permit adopted the designation WRTV in February 1953, so as to more closely identify it with the Walter Reade organization.

Groundbreaking for the studio and transmitter site took place on August 15, 1953, at the Eatontown Drive-In, another Reade property, which replaced the original Savoy plan. Reade pledged to provide independent, community-oriented service with a picture better than that received in the area from New York City's stations. It was also announced that plans eventually called for WRTV to move from Eatontown to larger quarters in Asbury Park.

Television is, in our opinion, a fascinating, challenging new development in the field of showmanship—the same type of showmanship that is inherent in the motion picture industry.

— Walter Reade, Jr.

The station began broadcasting test patterns on December 14, 1953, and the "Walter Reade Theater of the Air" began programming on January 22, 1954, though some programs had been broadcast on a test basis in the days leading up to the formal launch. Broadcasting from its 465-foot (142 m) tower, the tallest structure in Monmouth County, WRTV broadcast five hours of programming a day, including movies and a variety of local productions. Local people were also involved in channel 58's operations, including when four local high schools and Rutgers University each took over the entire station for a day.

WRTV held its own for a year, but systemic problems with UHF television, particularly the fact that not all televisions of the time were required to have UHF tuners (a requirement that would not become reality until the All-Channel Receiver Act took effect in 1964), began to hinder its progress. On January 13, 1955, Reade filed to have VHF channel 8 assigned to the Asbury Park area, claiming it would allow for more viewers to see the station and enhance the impact of sponsorships on WRTV, a station which he claimed aired more live and local programming than any other in the United States. Reade declared that he would continue to operate on channel 58 and, were the petition to be denied, seek other methods of improving service. Minimum mileage separations between stations on the same channel, however, would not permit a plan without revisions to the FCC's allocation plan, which prompted the commission to take a look at scrapping what was described as the "keystone" of its television frequency management plan.

In early March, a channel 8 television station, WGAL-TV in Lancaster, Pennsylvania, filed with the FCC to block the WRTV channel 8 petition, claiming that the proposed facility would reduce its own service area and cause interference. It was joined by WNHC-TV, the channel 8 station in New Haven, Connecticut, two weeks later. Despite Reade's claim in the initial petition, the station soon changed its mind. On March 24, WRTV asked the FCC to allow it to cease UHF operations on April 1, hopeful that the commission would look favorably on its channel 8 application and citing the interest news of the proposal generated. After a sermonette, the station went off the air at 9:05 p.m. on April 1, 1955.

WRTV's construction permit remained active for years after the closure. In November 1964, it was included as one of a series of dark UHF outlets that received letters from the FCC ordering them to get on the air or relinquish their permits. The station was able to retain authorization. The Reade Organization then filed to make a major move for WRTV, from channel 58 in Asbury Park to channel 68 in Newark, proposing the Empire State Building as its transmitter site. The Empire State Building proposal drew the ire of New York independent station WPIX, which contended that Reade and competing applicant Clifton Greene were breaking FCC rules by specifying the site and that operation on channel 68 would be short-spaced to channel 67 from Patchogue. In response, Reade amended its application to specify a site in West Orange, New Jersey.

On January 21, 1969, the WRTV construction permit was deleted by the FCC, and the application for Newark was considered by the FCC to be a standalone application for a new construction permit. The FCC deleted the call sign, but allowed it to be held in abeyance for use by Reade pending appeal of the deletion. The appeal was not successful, and the WRTV call letters ultimately went to Indianapolis in 1972.

Reade chose WWRO as channel 68's call letters, assigned October 5, 1970. The channel 68 construction permit was sold by Reade to Blonder-Tongue Laboratories in 1972, with that company intending to use the facility for subscription television. Ultimately, the state of New Jersey returned the channel 58 frequency to the air in 1973 as the New Brunswick–licensed North Jersey station for its public television network, then known as New Jersey Public Television, now known as NJ PBS. By coincidence, it was assigned and broadcasts over digital channel 8 in the digital age (along with WGAL-TV), though it continues to use channel 58 as its virtual channel.
