= Blonder Tongue Labs =

American communications equipment company

Blonder Tongue Laboratories, Inc.
- Company type: Public
- Traded as: OTCQB: BDRL
- Industry: Communication equipment
- Founded: 1950
- Headquarters: Old Bridge, New Jersey, the U.S.
- Key people: Issac "Ike" Blonder (Founder); Ben H. Tongue (Founder); Bob Palle (Chairman/CEO)
- Revenue: $28.41 million (As of 2013)
- Website: www.blondertongue.com

Blonder Tongue Laboratories Inc. is a global communication equipment supplier for TV broadcasters, cable system operators, lodging video, internet systems and institutional systems. A cable television pioneer, the company was founded in 1950.

== Background ==
The company was incorporated in 1988 as a successor to a New Jersey corporation operating under the same name. The services of the company include television signal encoding, transcoding, digital transport and broadband product for a variety of applications. The company manufactures its products in its headquarters and it also outsources some production with a contractor in the People’s Republic of China.

The total revenue of the company from 2010 to 2012 was $30.64 million, $26.67 million, $30.51 million, respectively. One of the company's products, Analog Video Headend, which is used for signal transport and processing, made up for 26% of the company's revenue in 2011.

In 2012, K-Tech Telecommunications, Inc. sued Blonder Tongue for infringement of several television translator patents. (Case 2:12-cv-05316-GHK-MRW in Los Angeles Federal District Court) The case was dismissed after all asserted patent claims were held invalid by Judge Klausner. The decision was affirmed on appeal by the Court of Appeals for the Federal Circuit on April 16, 2014 (Appeal 2013-145), and a petition for rehearing en banc was denied June 6, 2014.

== In popular culture ==
The indie rock band Swirlies named their 1993 album Blonder Tongue Audio Baton after a graphic equalizer that the company manufactured from 1959 to 1961.
