= 1981 in American television =

In 1981, television in the United States saw a number of significant events, including the debuts, finales, and cancellations of television shows; the launch, closure, and rebranding of channels; changes and additions to network affiliations by stations; controversies, business transactions, and carriage disputes; and the deaths of individuals who had made notable contributions to the medium.

== Events ==
Date	Event
January 12	The television series Dynasty begins a nine-year run on the ABC network. The prime time soap opera, described by New York Times television critic Tom Buckley as "An embarrassingly obvious knockoff of Dallas", stars John Forsythe as Blake Carrington. Dynasty would be the #1 rated television program in the United States during the 1983–84 television season.
January 15	Hill Street Blues, described as "one of the most innovative and critically acclaimed television shows in recent television history" and a program that "set an entirely new standard for television drama" debuts on NBC at 10:00 pm EST.
January 20	Former actor and governor Ronald Reagan is sworn in as President of the United States. It is the most watched presidential inauguration in American history.
February 6	The cast of The Brady Bunch reunites for the television movie The Brady Girls Get Married. Although scheduled to be shown in its original full-length movie format, NBC at the last minute divides it into half-hour segments. NBC shows one part per week for three weeks, and the fourth week debuts a spin-off sitcom, titled The Brady Brides. This proves to be the only time the entire cast worked together on a single project, following the cancellation of the original series.
February 14	Funky 4 + 1 performs "That's the Joint" on NBC's Saturday Night Live. This makes them the first hip-hop act to perform on primetime (late night) television. Blondie frontwoman Debbie Harry hosts (and performs on) this episode, shortly after the release of "Rapture", which later hits the top of the Billboard Hot 100 chart, thus becoming the first number-one song to feature rap vocals.
February 20	Comedian Andy Kaufman disrupts sketches and starts a brawl while broadcasting during ABC's sketch series Fridays, an occurrence that was later disclosed to have been entirely staged.
February 21	During an improvised segment at the end of a Saturday Night Live telecast on NBC, hosted by actress Charlene Tilton, Charles Rocket uses the word "fuck". As a result of the ensuing controversy, he is later fired, along with producer Jean Doumanian and most of his fellow cast members, bringing an early end to a season that had been heavily criticized and sunk in the ratings.
February 27	The made-for-television film The Munsters' Revenge is broadcast on NBC. Based on 1964–1966 sitcom The Munsters, the film reunites original cast members Fred Gwynne, Yvonne De Carlo, and Al Lewis. This was the last production to be made with most of the original actors from the 1960s television series.
March 1	Miracle on Ice, a hastily made docudrama about the United States men's national ice hockey team's gold medal victory in the Winter Olympics at Lake Placid, New York from the year prior, airs on ABC. The film stars Karl Malden as head coach Herb Brooks, Steve Guttenberg as goaltender Jim Craig, and Andrew Stevens as captain Mike Eruzione. This would not be the last time that the event, known as the "Miracle on Ice", would be depicted in a film. Twenty-three years later, Disney would release Miracle, which would star this time Kurt Russell as Herb Brooks.
March 4	CBS Sports pays $48,000,000 for the rights to broadcast the NCAA men's basketball tournament for three years, outbidding the NBC network, which had built the popularity of the playoffs since 1969. Bryant Gumbel would later comment, "I thought, How weird. We make the tournament a big deal and basically give it away."
March 6	After a nineteen-year run, Walter Cronkite resigns as main anchorman of The CBS Evening News, and is succeeded the next Monday by Dan Rather.
March 9	Dan Rather begins a nearly twenty-four-year tenure as lead anchorman for the CBS Evening News, lasting until he would be pressured to retire on March 9, 2005.
March 17	Norman Fell and Audra Lindley make their final appearances as Stanley and Helen Roper on the ABC sitcom Three's Company.
March 18	Independent television station KGCT-TV signs on the air in Tulsa, Oklahoma.
March 18	The television show The Greatest American Hero premieres on ABC, starring William Katt as Ralph Hinkley, an ordinary teacher who is given super powers, but not the knowledge of how to control them. Less than two weeks later, after John Hinckley Jr. shot U.S. President Ronald Reagan, the character would be renamed "Ralph Hanley" for episodes already filmed, and then "Mr. H." for the rest of the season. The show's theme song, "Believe It or Not" (sung by Joey Scarbury) later became a hit single, rising to No. 2 on the Billboard Top 40.
March 20	The sitcom Dennis the Menace begins its first transmission in Ireland, when the series goes on the air on RTÉ Television.
March 30	An assassination attempt against President Ronald Reagan in Washington, DC, in which the President and several other people would be wounded, interrupts daytime soap operas on the three major networks (One Life to Live on ABC, As the World Turns (the same soap which was interrupted to announce the assassination of John F. Kennedy in 1963) on CBS and Another World on NBC) and CNN by 3 pm. Millions of viewers then witness footage of the shooting and the chaos that followed. ABC News is flooded with unconfirmed reports, which pesters the chief anchor Frank Reynolds, one of which falsely states that the President's press secretary James Brady had died in the shooting. This is also reported by Dan Rather at CBS News. Coverage of the assassination attempt continues for hours on the big three networks, and for two days on CNN. As a result, programmes such as General Hospital (then at its height of popularity) and The Edge of Night on ABC, Guiding Light, a daytime rerun of One Day at a Time, and a rerun of primetime series The White Shadow on CBS, and Texas on NBC are preempted for the day, while the Academy Awards would be postponed for a day.
March 30	NBC broadcasts its final NCAA Division I Basketball Championship Game, having done so since 1969. The tournament then moves to CBS the following year. Dick Enberg, Billy Packer, and Al McGuire called that game for NBC.
April 1	Berlinda Tolbert and Michael Jonas Evans makes their final appearances as Lionel and Jenny Willis Jefferson on the CBS sitcom The Jeffersons as series regulars.
April 1	A videotape is shown on CNN, reportedly made during a January 6, 1981 broadcast of The Dick Maurice Show, showing psychic Tamara Rand's appearance on the talk show seen on KTNV in Las Vegas, and her prediction of a March 30, 1981 event. On the tape, shown again the next day on NBC's Today and ABC's Good Morning America, Rand is seen telling Maurice that "the last few days of March or early April" would be "a crisis time" for U.S. President Ronald Reagan; that when she had the vision she felt "a thud" in her chest but that she also perceived "gunshots all over the place". Rand then added that "It has to do with somebody young and radical... The only thing I can attach to it is Humbley, and maybe Jack, or something like that." Five days later, after the authenticity of the tape came into dispute, Rand and Maurice admits that the prediction sequence had been taped the day after the March 30 attempted assassination of Reagan by John W. Hinckley, Jr.
April 11	Van Halen's lead guitarist Eddie Van Halen marries actress Valerie Bertinelli, who appears on the CBS sitcom One Day at a Time.
April 12	The Alpha Repertory Television Service (also known as ARTS) launches, right after the Nickelodeon time period.
April 21	"Weird Al" Yankovic makes his first television appearance on NBC's The Tomorrow Show with Tom Snyder.
May 1	The season-four finale of Dallas, entitled "Ewing-Gate", airs on CBS.
May 5–14	The NBA Finals between the Boston Celtics and Houston Rockets is broadcast on CBS. This is the last NBA Finals to be broadcast on tape-delay, with weeknight games airing after the late local news in most cities except in Boston and Houston. Games 3 and 4 are played back-to-back on Saturday and Sunday, May 9 and 10, to give CBS two live Finals games. Game 3 is the last Finals contest played on a Saturday until Game 5 in 2021. Game 4 tipps off at noon Central (1 pm Eastern/10 am Pacific) on Mother's Day for CBS to telecast golf following the game. Had Game 7 been played, it would have tipped off at 1 pm Eastern. All in all, the Finals drews a 6.7 rating, according to Nielsen Media Research. Consequently, this is the lowest-rated NBA Finals in history prior to 2003.
May 7	Stand-up comedian Jerry Seinfeld, of Massapequa, New York, performs for a national audience for the first time, introduced by Johnny Carson on The Tonight Show on NBC. His routine, taped in the evening, airs an hour into that night's show. Seinfeld's national television debut had been in 1980 on three episodes of sitcom Benson.
May 15	The Harlem Globetrotters on Gilligan's Island, the third and final made-for-television film that reunited the cast of the 1964–1967 sitcom Gilligan's Island, airs on NBC.
June 2	On ABC's 20/20, Barbara Walters asks Katharine Hepburn, "If you were a tree, what kind of tree would you be?"
June 24	The series finale of Charlie's Angels airs on ABC.
June 30	Fred Silverman is dismissed as president of NBC, after failing to improve that network's third-place rating, and is replaced by Grant Tinker.
July 4	Showtime ends its part-time status and inaugurates a 24/7 schedule.
July 10	The final episode of Sanford is broadcast on NBC. A sequel to the original 1972–1977 sitcom Sanford and Son, this officially marks the end of Redd Foxx's run as Fred G. Sanford.
July 29	A worldwide television audience of over 750 million people watches the Wedding of Charles, Prince of Wales, and Lady Diana Spencer at St Paul's Cathedral in London.
August 1	The MTV network debuts on cable television, playing music videos 24 hours a day. "Video Killed the Radio Star" by The Buggles is the first video broadcast on the network.
August 9	Following a two-month-long players strike, Major League Baseball resums with the All-Star Game, from Cleveland on NBC. During the strike (which began on June 12 and lasted through July 31), NBC used its Saturday Game of the Week time-slot to show a 20-minute strike update, followed by a sports anthology series hosted by Bruce Jenner called NBC Sports: The Summer Season.
August 14	The NBC soap opera Days of Our Lives broadcasts its 4,000th episode.
August 15	The Eternal Word Television Network, devoted to spreading the Roman Catholic faith in the United States and founded by Mother Angelica, makes its cable television debut at 6:00 p.m. Central Time, on the date of the Feast of the Assumption. Based in Irondale, Alabama, EWTN would later become the largest religious cable network in the world by 2000, shown on 1,500 systems in 38 nations.
August 30	In Baltimore, Maryland, CBS affiliate WMAR-TV swaps affiliations with NBC affiliate WBAL-TV, marking the first affiliation switch in that city. CBS cites weak ratings for WMAR-TV's newscasts and heavy pre-emptions of network programming for programs of local interest as the reason they chose to switch affiliations. (However, the NBC affiliation would return to WBAL-TV on January 2, 1995, with WMAR-TV switching to ABC, and WJZ-TV, which had been the city's only ABC affiliate at this point, switching to CBS.)
September 7	During the course of the year, several soap operas produced by Procter & Gamble changes title sequences and theme songs. On this day, new title sequences debuts for Another World on NBC and Guiding Light and Search for Tomorrow, both on CBS.
September 7	The People's Court makes its syndicated television debut on thirty-nine television stations in the United States. Created by producer Ralph Edwards, the show presents real small claims court cases, with the litigants agreeing to dismiss court proceedings and to go before retired Los Angeles Superior Court Judge Joseph A. Wapner. Of the $800 provided by the producers for each case, the amount not awarded to the plaintiff ($750 maximum) would be divided evenly between both sides. The series' first case sees a landlady receive an award of $614.
September 11	The Pee-wee Herman Show, a stage show starring Paul Reubens as his fictional comic character, Pee-wee Herman airs as a special on HBO. Taped at the Roxy Theatre in West Hollywood, California, this marks one of the first significant appearances of the Pee-wee Herman character. The nightclub show notably has more adult humor than the later children's television series Pee-wee's Playhouse.
September 12	The Smurfs begins a nine-season run on NBC Saturday morning television.
September 13	The 33rd Primetime Emmy Awards is broadcast on CBS. For the third consecutive year, the Emmy for Outstanding Comedy Series went to Taxi. The top show on the drama side was Hill Street Blues which, in its first season, tied the record for most major nominations (14) and wins (6) by a non-miniseries. NBC's Shōgun received eight major nominations, but only won one, for Outstanding Limited Series. Also, history was made when Isabel Sanford, star of The Jeffersons, became the first black woman to win an Emmy for Outstanding Lead Actress in a Comedy Series.
September 14	Entertainment Tonight makes its syndicated debut in various television markets.
September 26	Elvira's Movie Macabre, hosted by Cassandra Peterson, airs for the first time on KHJ-TV in Los Angeles.
September 28	WRGB in Schenectady, New York, NBC's first television affiliate, ends its forty-two-year relationship with the network (dating back to its days as experimental station W2XB) and swaps affiliations with CBS affiliate WAST, which changed its call letters to the current WNYT to mark the new affiliation.
September 29	Spectrum is initiated.
October 6	Priscilla Barnes makes her first appearance as Terri Alden on the ABC sitcom Three's Company. Alden was brought in as the full-time replacement for Chrissy Snow, following the departure of Suzanne Somers. Barnes would stay on Three's Company through the end of its run in 1984.
October 6	CBS broadcasts Return of the Beverly Hillbillies, which reunites most of the surviving cast members of the 1962–1971 sitcom The Beverly Hillbillies.
October 8	Cagney & Lacey is first telecast as a made-for-television movie on CBS, and attracts a Nielsen rating of 42.
October 10	SIN broadcasts the final of the 4th National OTI-SIN Festival live from the Fontainebleau Hilton Hotel in Miami Beach.
October 12	CBS Cable is initiated.
October 19	WPBT's news program Nightly Business Report becomes national, launching on over 125 public television stations.
October 29	The situation comedy Gimme a Break! begins a six-season run on NBC, as one of the few new hit shows of the 1981–82 season.
October 30	John Carpenter's 1978 horror film Halloween makes its broadcast network television premiere on NBC (the same day that its first sequel is released in theaters and the day before star Donald Pleasence guest-hosted NBC's Saturday Night Live). To fill the two-hour time slot, Carpenter filmed 12 minutes of additional material during the production of Halloween II. The newly filmed scenes include Dr. Loomis at a hospital board review of Michael Myers and Dr. Loomis talking to a then-6-year-old Michael at Smith's Grove, telling him, "You've fooled them, haven't you, Michael? But not me." Another extra scene featured Dr. Loomis at Smith's Grove examining Michael's abandoned cell after his escape and seeing the word "Sister" scratched into the door. Finally, a scene was added in which Lynda comes over to Laurie's house to borrow a silk blouse before Laurie leaves to babysit, just as Annie telephones asking to borrow the same blouse. The new scene had Laurie's hair hidden by a towel, since Jamie Lee Curtis was by then wearing a much shorter hairstyle than she had worn in 1978.
October 31	The punk rock band Fear's appearance on Saturday Night Live includes a group of slamdancers, among them John Belushi, Ian MacKaye of Minor Threat (and later Fugazi), Tesco Vee of the Meatmen, Harley Flanagan and John Joseph of the Cro-Mags, and John Brannon of Negative Approach. The show's director originally wanted to prevent the dancers from participating, so Belushi offered to be in the episode if the dancers were allowed to stay. The result is the shortening of Fear's appearance on television. Fear played "I Don't Care About You", "Beef Bologna", and "New York's Alright If You Like Saxophones", and started to play "Let's Have a War" when the telecast faded into commercial. The slamdancers left ripe pumpkin remains on the set. Cameras, a piano, and other property were damaged.
November 1	The NBC soap opera The Doctors broadcasts its 5,000th episode.
November 2	The CBS soap opera As the World Turns debuts a new opening sequence and theme song for the first time in its twenty-five-year history.
November 8	ESPN televises its first live flag-to-flag NASCAR race, the Atlanta Journal 500, which was won by Neil Bonnett.
November 9	The Incredible Hulk is cancelled immediately, despite and executive producer Kenneth Johnson's attempts to convince CBS to buy six additional episodes to fill season five.
November 11	Joan Collins makes her first appearance as Alexis Carrington Colby on the ABC drama Dynasty. During her stint with the programme, Collins would briefly bring back the popularity of women's wear with padded shoulders.
November 16–17	Luke and Laura's wedding on the ABC soap opera General Hospital becomes one of the most-watched weddings in American television history, second only to the wedding of Charles, Prince of Wales and Lady Diana Spencer.
November 30	Financial News Network goes on the air.
December 6	NBC affiliate KARD in West Monroe, Louisiana, and ABC affiliate KTVE in El Dorado, Arkansas swaps affiliations.
December 6	Interviewed by satellite in Tripoli by the ABC News program This Week With David Brinkley, Libya's President Muammar Gaddafi denies a U.S. State Department report that he had sent a "hit squad" to assassinate U.S. President Ronald Reagan. Speaking in English, Gaddafi said "We are sure we haven't sent any people to kill Reagan or any other people in the world... if they have evidence, we are ready to see this evidence." He added, "How you are silly people! You are superpower, how you are afraid? Oh, it is silly this administration, and this president." Despite rumors that a 5, 10 or 14 member death squad had landed in the U.S. the previous weekend, nothing was ever confirmed and no person was ever arrested or detained.
December 11	KJAA in Lubbock, Texas, signs on the air as an independent station. It adopted its current call letters KJTV in 1985 and became a charter Fox affiliate the next year.
December 14	WFTS-TV in Tampa Bay, Florida, signs on the air as an independent station. It eventually became a Fox station in 1988, and an ABC affiliate via an agreement with Scripps-Howard in 1994.
December 18	Raleigh's first independent station WLFL-TV goes on the air. It became a charter Fox affiliate in 1986, moving to The WB in 1998, and finally with The CW in 2006.
December 18	Tom Brokaw signs off from the NBC morning program The Today Show. Bryant Gumbel would succeed him as anchor some weeks later. Brokaw would go on to anchor NBC Nightly News with Roger Mudd for most of 1982, before becoming sole anchor.
December 19	KVEO-TV in Brownsville, Texas, signs on the air, returning primary NBC service to the Rio Grande Valley market for the first time since KRGV-TV in Weslaco left the network in 1976 to become a full-time ABC affiliate.
December 24	HBO begins broadcasting 24 hours a day.
December 25	Chuck Woolery hosts his last episode of the NBC game show Wheel of Fortune, quitting after a salary dispute with series producer and creator Merv Griffin. The next Monday, December 28, Pat Sajak beings hosting.
December 31	Cable News Network 2, later called CNN Headline News and now HLN, first appears on American cable television.

== Programs ==
=== Debuting this year ===
Date	Show	Network
January 12	Dynasty	ABC
January 15	Hill Street Blues	NBC
January 16	Harper Valley PTA	NBC
January 16	Nero Wolfe	NBC
January 31	Walking Tall	CBS
February 6	The Brady Brides	NBC
February 12	The Gangster Chronicles	NBC
March 18	The Greatest American Hero	ABC
April 6	Private Benjamin	CBS
April 9	Checking In	CBS
May 16	SCTV Network 90	NBC
July 17	Comedy Theater	NBC
August 7	The Krypton Factor	ABC
August 21	Rosie	CBS
September 10	Best of the West	ABC
September 12	Goldie Gold and Action Jack	ABC
September 12	The Kid Super Power Hour with Shazam!	NBC
September 12	The Smurfs	NBC
September 12	Space Stars	NBC
September 12	Spider-Man and His Amazing Friends	NBC
September 12	The Kwicky Koala Show	CBS
September 12	Trollkins	CBS
September 12	Spider-Man	Syndication
September 14	Entertainment Tonight	Syndication
October 7	Mr. Merlin	CBS
October 9	Behind the Screen	CBS
October 10	Laverne & Shirley in the Army	ABC
October 24	Fitz and Bones	NBC
October 25	Today's F.B.I.	ABC
October 26	Battlestars	NBC
October 28	Love, Sidney	NBC
October 29	Gimme a Break	NBC
October 29	Lewis & Clark	NBC
November 1	Code Red	ABC
November 3	Father Murphy	NBC
November 4	The Fall Guy	ABC
November 11	Shannon	CBS
November 13	Strike Force	ABC
November 15	This Week	ABC
November 20	McClain's Law	NBC
November 24	Simon & Simon	CBS
November 27	Darkroom	ABC
November 28	Open All Night	ABC
December 1	Bret Maverick	NBC
December 4	Falcon Crest	CBS
December 4	You Can't Do That on Television	Nickelodeon

=== Ending this year ===
Date	Show	Debut
March 7	The Tim Conway Show	1980
April 10	Hollywood Squares (returned in 1983)	1966
April 16	Buck Rogers in the 25th Century	1979
April 20	Soap	1977
May 23	Eight Is Enough	1977
June 10	The Muppet Show	1976
July 10	Sanford	1980
July 21	Flo	1980
August 19	Charlie's Angels	1976
June 4	The Waltons	1972
August 28	Comedy Theater	1981
August 29	Eight is Enough	1977
September 1	CBN Satellite Service	1977
October 23	Card Sharks (returned in 1986)	1978
October 24	Fat Albert and the Cosby Kids (returned in 1984)	1972
October 31	Super Friends (returned in 1983)	1973
November 30	The Mike Douglas Show	1961
December 5	Heathcliff	1980
December 15	Peanuts (cancellation not announced by CBS until July 12, 1983; returned in 2023)	1969
December 17	Tomorrow Coast to Coast	1973

=== Changing networks ===
Show	Moved from	Moved to
Walt Disney anthology series	NBC	CBS
SCTV	Syndication	NBC

=== Made-for-TV movies and miniseries ===
Title	Network	Date(s) of airing
Dark Night of the Scarecrow	CBS	October 24
Fallen Angel	CBS	February 24
Miracle on Ice	ABC	March 1
Masada	ABC	April 5–8
The Adventures of Nellie Bly	NBC	June 11
The Harlem Globetrotters on Gilligan's Island	NBC	May 15
The Five of Me	CBS	May 12
Return of the Beverly Hillbillies	CBS	October 6
Family Reunion	NBC	October 11 & 12
Jacqueline Bouvier Kennedy	ABC	October 14
Skokie	CBS	November 17
Bill	CBS	December 22

== Networks and services ==
=== Launches ===
Network	Type	Launch date	Notes	Source
Hispanic Information and Telecommunications Network	Cable television	Unknown		
Star	Satellite television	Unknown		
Take 2	Cable television	January 31		
Alpha Repertory Television Service	Cable television	April 12		
Spotlight	Cable television	May 28		
MTV	Cable television	August 1		
EWTN	Cable television	August 15	Catholic religious	
ASPN	Cable television	October 1		
CBS Cable	Cable television	October 12		
PRISM Sports New England	Cable television	November 6		
Financial News Network	Cable television	November 30		

=== Conversions and rebrandings ===
Old network name	New network name	Type	Conversion Date	Notes	Source
CBN Satellite Network	CBN Cable Network	Cable television	September 1		

=== Closures ===
There are no closures for Cable and satellite television channels in this year.

== Television stations ==
=== Station launches ===
Date	City of license/Market	Station	Channel	Affiliation	Notes/Ref.
January 13	Cleveland, Ohio	WCLQ-TV	61	Independent	
January 13	Detroit, Michigan	WRHT	31	Independent	
January 26	Dallas-Fort Worth, Texas	KTWS-TV	27	Independent	
February 8	Clarksburg, West Virginia	WLYJ	46	Religious independent	
February 15	Jacksonville, Florida	WAWS-TV	30	Independent	
March 6	Oklahoma City, Oklahoma	KTBO-TV	14	TBN	
March 18	Tulsa, Oklahoma	KGCT-TV	41	Independent	
April	Santa Rosa, California	KFTY	50	Independent	Currently licensed to Fremont, California
April 6	Poughkeepsie/New York City, New York	WFTI-TV	51	Independent	Now licensed in Jersey City, New Jersey
April 6	Washington, D.C.	WCQR	50	Independent	
May 5	Lake Charles, Louisiana	KLTL-TV	18	PBS	Part of Louisiana Public Broadcasting
May 8	Albuquerque/Santa Fe, New Mexico	KGSW-TV	14	Independent	
May 9	Greensboro, North Carolina	WGGT-TV	33	Independent	
May 13	Lafayette, Louisiana	KLPB-TV	24	PBS	Part of Louisiana Public Broadcasting
May 29	Princeton/Atlantic City, New Jersey	WWAC-TV	44	Independent	
May 31	San Jose, California (San Francisco/Oakland, California)	KSTS	48	Independent	
June 1	Fayetteville/Raleigh/Durham, North Carolina	WKFT	40	Independent	
June 15	Philadelphia, Pennsylvania	WWSG-TV	57	Independent	
July 13	Philadelphia, Pennsylvania	WRBV	65	Independent	
August 16	Marion, Illinois	WDDD-TV	27	Independent	
August 22	Atlanta, Georgia	WVEU	69	Independent	
September 1	Columbia, South Carolina	WCCT-TV	57	Independent	
September 18	Chicago, Illinois	WFBN	66	Independent	
October 11	Reno, Nevada	KAME-TV	21	Independent	
October 18	Boise, Idaho	KTRV	12	Independent	
November 1	Salinas/Monterey, California	KCBA	35	SIN	
November 15	Arecibo, Puerto Rico	WATX-TV	54	Independent	
November 20	San Jose, California	K42DT	42	TBN	
November 21	San Jose, California	KECH	22	Independent	
December 4	Seaford/Dover, Delaware (Salisbury, Maryland)	WDPB	64	PBS	Satellite of WHYY-TV/Wilmington, Delaware
December 7	North Pole/Fairbanks, Alaska	KJNP-TV	4	Religious Independent	
December 11	Lubbock, Texas	KJAA	34	Independent	
December 14	Tampa, Florida	WFTS-TV	28	Independent	
December 18	Raleigh, North Carolina	WLFL	22	Independent	
December 19	Brownsville, Texas (McAllen/Harlingen, Texas)	KVEO-TV	23	NBC	

=== Network affiliation changes ===
Date	City of License/Market	Station	Channel	Old affiliation	New affiliation	Notes/Ref.
August 30	Baltimore, Maryland	WMAR-TV	2	CBS	NBC	
August 30	Baltimore, Maryland	WBAL-TV	11	NBC	CBS	
September 28	Albany, New York	WRGB	6	NBC	CBS	
September 28	Albany, New York	WNYT	13	CBS	NBC	
December 6	El Dorado, Arkansas (Monroe, Louisiana)	KTVE	10	ABC	NBC	
December 6	West Monroe/Monroe, Louisiana (El Dorado, Arkansas)	KLAA	14	NBC	ABC	
Unknown date	Cheyenne, Wyoming	KGWN-TV	5	ABC	CBS	
Unknown date	Matamoros, Tamaulipas, Mexico (Brownsville/Harlingen/McAllen, Texas)	XHRIO-TV	2	English independent	Spanish independent	
Unknown date	Scottsbluff, Nebraska	KSTF	10	ABC	CBS	

=== Station closures ===
Date	City of License/Market	Station	Channel	Affiliation	First air date	Notes/Ref.
Unknown date	Berlin, New Hampshire	WEDB-TV	40	PBS	April 30, 1969	Part of the New Hampshire Public Television network

== Births ==
Date	Name	Notability
January 1	Eden Riegel	Actress (All My Children, The Young and the Restless), voice actress (Stitch!, The Lion Guard)
January 5	Brooklyn Sudano	Actress (My Wife and Kids)
January 8	Genevieve Cortese	Actress (Wildfire)
January 13	Shad Gaspard	Actor and pro wrestler (d. 2020)
January 13	Diana Perez	American television reporter
January 13	Ginger Zee	TV personality
January 15	Pitbull	Singer and actor
January 15	Howie Day	Singer
January 17	Ray J	Singer and actor (Moesha)
January 19	Bitsie Tulloch	Actress (lonelygirl15, Grimm)
January 20	Daniel Cudmore	Actor
January 22	Beverley Mitchell	Actress (7th Heaven)
January 23	Julia Jones	Actress
January 24	Carrie Coon	Actress (The Leftovers, Fargo)
January 25	Alicia Keys	Singer, songwriter and actress (The Voice)
January 25	Charlie Bewley	Actor
January 26	Colin O'Donoghue	Irish actor (Once Upon a Time)
January 28	Elijah Wood	Actor (Wilfred, Tron: Uprising, Over the Garden Wall)
January 29	Tenoch Huerta	Actor
January 31	Justin Timberlake	Singer (NSYNC) and actor (The Mickey Mouse Club, frequent Saturday Night Live host)
February 1	John Gemberling	Actor
February 1	Conor Knighton	Actor
February 2	Emily Rose	Actress (Haven)
February 3	Alisa Reyes	Actress (All That, The Proud Family)
February 5	Sara Foster	Actress (90210)
February 6	Alison Haislip	Actress and TV personality (Attack of the Show!, The Morning After, Battleground)
February 8	Jim Parrack	Actor
February 10	Uzo Aduba	Actress (Orange Is the New Black, Steven Universe)
February 10	Stephanie Beatriz	Argentine-born American actress (Brooklyn Nine-Nine)
February 10	Holly Willoughby	Television presenter who cameoed with Phillip Schofield, in Ted Lasso in Season 2
February 11	Kelly Rowland	Singer (Destiny's Child) and actress
February 11	Olivia Longott	Singer
February 17	Joseph Gordon-Levitt	Actor (Tommy Solomon on 3rd Rock from the Sun)
February 17	Paris Hilton	Actress and TV personality (The Simple Life)
February 20	Majandra Delfino	Actress and singer (Roswell)
February 20	Jocko Sims	Actor
February 20	Stephanie Wittels Wachs	Actress
February 23	Josh Gad	Actor (1600 Penn)
February 27	Josh Groban	Actor
March 1	Adam LaVorgna	Actor (7th Heaven)
March 2	Lance Cade	Pro wrestler (d. 2010)
March 2	Bryce Dallas Howard	Actress (HitRecord on TV) and daughter of Ron Howard
March 3	P. J. Black	Pro wrestler
March 6	Ellen Muth	Actress (Dead Like Me)
March 7	Jason Latimer	American illusionist
March 8	Vinita Nair	American journalist
March 10	Michael Pitt	American actor
March 11	David Anders	Actor (Alias, Heroes, The Vampire Diaries, Once Upon a Time, iZombie)
March 11	LeToya Luckett	Singer (Destiny's Child) and actress
March 14	Ryan Cartwright	Actor
March 18	Chris Geere	Actor
March 19	Dan Levy	Actor
March 21	Juju Castaneda	Actress
March 22	Tiffany Dupont	Actress (Greek)
March 23	Jenn Brown	American sports broadcaster and television host
March 24	Philip Winchester	Actor (Law and Order: SVU)
March 24	Neil Grayston	Actor
March 27	Ashley Bank	Actress
March 28	Julia Stiles	Actress (Dexter)
March 29	Megan Hilty	Actress
March 30	Katy Mixon	Actress (Eastbound & Down, American Housewife)
March 31	Ryan Bingham	Actor
April 2	Bethany Joy Lenz	Actress (Guiding Light, One Tree Hill) and singer
April 6	Eliza Coupe	Actress (Scrubs, Happy Endings, Benched)
April 7	Vanessa Olivarez	Singer
April 8	Taylor Kitsch	Actor (Friday Night Lights)
April 11	Laura Bell Bundy	Actress
April 12	Tulsi Gabbard	Politician and Commentator (Fox News)
April 13	Courtney Peldon	Actress (Harry and the Hendersons, Boston Public)
April 19	Hayden Christensen	Actor
April 19	Catalina Sandino Moreno	Actress
April 28	Jessica Alba	Actress (Dark Angel)
April 28	Alex Riley	Pro wrestler
April 28	Catherine Reitman	Actress
April 30	Kunal Nayyar	British-Indian actor (The Big Bang Theory, Sanjay and Craig)
April 30	Rose Rollins	Actress
May 2	Robert Buckley	Actor (One Tree Hill)
May 3	Farrah Franklin	Singer (Destiny's Child) and actress
May 5	Danielle Fishel	Actress (Boy Meets World, Girl Meets World)
May 5	Zach McGowan	Actor (Black Sails, The 100)
May 5	Soren Thompson	American épée fencer
May 8	Stephen Amell	Canadian actor (Arrow)
May 11	JP Karliak	Actor, voice actor and comedian (The Boss Baby: Back in Business, Dorothy and the Wizard of Oz)
May 15	Jamie-Lynn Sigler	Actress (The Sopranos)
May 16	Joseph Morgan	English actor (The Vampire Diaries)
May 16	Athena Karkanis	Actress
May 17	R. J. Helton	Singer
May 22	Bryan Danielson	Pro wrestler
May 23	Tim Robinson	Actor and comedian (Saturday Night Live)
May 29	Chris Violette	Canadian actor (Power Rangers S.P.D.)
May 29	Justin Chon	Actor (Just Jordan)
May 29	Anders Holm	Actor
June 1	Amy Schumer	Actress and comedian (Inside Amy Schumer)
June 1	Johnny Pemberton	Actor (Pickle and Peanut, Superstore, Son of Zorn)
June 2	Velvet Sky	Wrestler
June 4	T.J. Miller	Actor (Gravity Falls, Silicon Valley)
June 4	Zhubin Parang	Writer
June 6	Johnny Pacar	Actor (Flight 29 Down)
June 7	Larisa Oleynik	Actress (The Secret World of Alex Mack, Winx Club)
June 9	Natalie Portman	Actress (Saturday Night Live host in 2006)
June 15	Jordi Vilasuso	Actor
June 15	Marie Harf	American political commentator
June 17	Jared Cotter	Singer
June 18	Scooter Braun	American media proprietor, record executive, and investor
June 19	Robin McLeavy	Actress
June 20	Alisan Porter	Actress
June 21	Christina Cewe	Singer
June 21	Nicola Correia-Damude	Actress
June 22	Porsha Williams	Actress
June 24	Vanessa Ray	Actress (As the World Turns, Blue Bloods)
June 26	Adrianna Costa	American television personality
July 1	Kym Jackson	Actress
July 1	Teddi Mellencamp Arroyave	American television personality
July 4	Safaree Samuels	American hype man and reality television actor
July 5	Ryan Hansen	Actor (Veronica Mars)
July 8	Lance Gross	Actor
July 9	Michelle Collins	Comedian and talk show host
July 13	Michael Mando	Actor
July 15	Taylor Kinney	Actor (Chicago Fire)
July 16	Michelle Morgan	Canadian actress (Heartland)
July 18	Michiel Huisman	Actor
July 21	Blake Lewis	Singer (American Idol)
July 21	Chrishell Stause	Actress (All My Children, Days of Our Lives, Youthful Daze)
July 22	Fandango	Pro wrestler
July 22	Clive Standen	Actor
July 24	Summer Glau	Actress (Firefly, Terminator: The Sarah Connor Chronicles, Sequestered)
July 28	Billy Aaron Brown	Actor (8 Simple Rules)
July 28	Neil Casey	Actor
July 29	Dyana Liu	Actress (Tower Prep), voice actress (Fanboy & Chum Chum, Pig Goat Banana Cricket)
July 30	Lisa Goldstein	Actress (One Tree Hill)
July 30	Lisa Wilhoit	Actress (My So-Called Life, Family Guy)
July 31	Alexander Torrenegra	Investor
July 31	Eric Lively	Actor
August 2	Dylan Dreyer	American television meteorologist
August 4	Amanda Congdon	Actress and video blogger (Rocketboom)
August 4	Meghan Markle	Actress (Suits)
August 4	Abigail Spencer	Actress (All My Children, Burning Love, Rectify)
August 5	Jesse Williams	Actor (Grey's Anatomy)
August 6	Leslie Odom Jr.	Actor
August 7	Randy Wayne	Actor
August 8	Meagan Good	Actress (Cousin Skeeter)
August 14	Kofi Kingston	Pro wrestler
August 15	Brooke Anderson	Television actress
August 17	Kristin Adams	Television personality
August 19	Nate Burleson	Host
August 21	Erin Kelly	Actress (Beyond the Break)
August 22	Ross Marquand	Actor
August 23	Jaime Lee Kirchner	Actress
August 24	Chad Michael Murray	Actor (Gilmore Girls, Dawson's Creek, One Tree Hill, Chosen, Agent Carter)
August 25	Rachel Bilson	Actress (The O.C., Hart of Dixie)
August 25	Andrew Chambliss	Writer
August 27	Karla Mosley	Actress
August 27	Patrick J. Adams	Actor
August 29	Jay Ryan	Australian actor (Beauty & the Beast)
August 31	Joshua Close	Actor
September 1	Boyd Holbrook	Actor
September 4	Beyoncé	Singer (Destiny's Child) and actress
September 5	Aaron Bay-Schuck	American music industry executive
September 7	Athena Karkanis	Actress
September 8	Jonathan Taylor Thomas	Actor (Home Improvement)
September 9	Julie Gonzalo	Argentine-American actress (Veronica Mars, Eli Stone, Dallas)
September 10	Ben Aaron	New York City-based media personality
September 12	Hosea Chanchez	Actor (The Game)
September 12	Jennifer Hudson	Singer (American Idol, The Jennifer Hudson Show, The Voice US)
September 13	EJay Day	Singer
September 15	Ben Schwartz	Actor (Parks and Recreation, House of Lies, Randy Cunningham: 9th Grade Ninja, DuckTales, Rise of the Teenage Mutant Ninja Turtles, Pinky Malinky)
September 16	Alexis Bledel	Actress (Gilmore Girls)
September 18	Jennifer Tisdale	Actress and sister of Ashley Tisdale
September 18	Arie Luyendyk Jr.	Television personality
September 20	Mandy Bruno	Actress (Guiding Light)
September 21	Nicole Richie	Actress and TV personality (The Simple Life)
September 22	Ashley Eckstein	Actress (That's So Raven, Star Wars: The Clone Wars, Sofia the First, Ultimate Spider-Man, Star Wars Rebels)
September 24	Fernanda Urrejola	Actress
September 25	Lee Norris	Actor (Boy Meets World, One Tree Hill, Girl Meets World)
September 25	Dan Mintz	Voice actor (Bob's Burgers)
September 25	Victor Blackwell	News anchor
September 26	Christina Milian	Actress (Grandfathered)
September 28	Melissa Claire Egan	Actress (All My Children, The Young and the Restless)
September 28	Jerrika Hinton	Actress (Grey's Anatomy)
September 28	Rebecca Jarvis	American journalist
September 29	Kelly McCreary	Actress (Grey's Anatomy)
October 3	Seth Gabel	Actor (Fringe, Salem)
October 8	Ben Lyons	Sportcaster
October 9	Zachery Ty Bryan	Actor (Home Improvement)
October 9	Rupert Friend	Actor
October 12	Brian J. Smith	Actor (Stargate Universe)
October 12	Dan Oster	Comedic actor (Mad TV)
October 15	Keyshia Cole	Singer
October 16	Brea Grant	Actress (Heroes)
October 16	Caterina Scorsone	Actress (Missing, Grey's Anatomy, Private Practice)
October 18	Gabrielle Dennis	Actress (The Game, Blue Mountain State, Rosewood)
October 22	Michael Fishman	Actor (Roseanne)
October 22	John Boyd	Actor (24, Bones)
October 30	Shaun Sipos	Actor (Complete Savages)
October 30	Fiona Dourif	Actress
October 31	Ivanka Trump	TV personality
November 1	Matt Jones	Actor (Breaking Bad, Mom), voice actor (Kick Buttowski: Suburban Daredevil, Sanjay and Craig, Pig Goat Banana Cricket)
November 1	LaTavia Roberson	Singer (Destiny's Child)
November 8	Azura Skye	Actress (Zoe, Duncan, Jack and Jane)
November 9	Scottie Thompson	Actress (NCIS, Trauma)
November 10	Ryback	
November 11	Susan Kelechi Watson	Actress (Louie, This Is Us)
November 11	Alex Sim-Wise	TV presenter
November 14	Vanessa Bayer	Actress (Saturday Night Live)
November 15	Daniel Casey	Screenwriter
November 16	Zerlina Maxwell	TV host
November 18	Allison Tolman	Actress (Fargo)
November 18	Christina Vidal	Actress (Taina)
November 18	Nasim Pedrad	Actress and comedian (Saturday Night Live, Scream Queens)
November 24	Krystal Ball	American political commentator
November 25	Jenna Bush Hager	American news personality
November 25	Amy Seimetz	American actress
November 26	Natasha Bedingfield	Singer
November 28	Erick Rowan	Pro wrestler
November 29	Kimberly Cullum	Actress
November 29	John Milhiser	Actor and comedian (Saturday Night Live)
November 30	Billy Lush	Actor
December 2	Britney Spears	Singer (The Mickey Mouse Club)
December 3	Brian Bonsall	Actor (Family Ties, Star Trek: The Next Generation)
December 3	Liza Lapira	Actress
December 3	Elliott Kalan	Writer
December 11	Jason Kennedy	Entertainment journalist
December 12	Eddie Kingston	Pro wrestler
December 13	Chelsea Hertford	Actress (Major Dad)
December 15	Michelle Dockery	English actress (Downton Abbey, Good Behavior)
December 16	Krysten Ritter	Actress (Don't Trust the B— in Apartment 23, Jessica Jones)
December 27	Jay Ellis	Actor (The Game, Insecure)
December 27	Emilie de Ravin	Actress (Roswell, Lost, Once Upon a Time)
December 28	Sienna Miller	Actress
December 31	Ricky Whittle	English actor (The 100)

== Deaths ==
Date	Name	Age	Notability
January 25	Adele Astaire	84	Actress
April 26	Jim Davis	71	Actor (Jock Ewing on Dallas)
June 9	Allen Ludden	63	Game show host (Password)
July 3	Ross Martin	61	Polish-born actor (Artemus Gordon on The Wild Wild West)
August 1	Paddy Chayefsky	58	Writer (Marty)
September 27	Robert Montgomery	77	Actor, host (Robert Montgomery Presents)
November 25	Jack Albertson	74	Actor (Chico and the Man)
November 29	Natalie Wood	43	Actress (The Pride of the Family, The Public Defender)

== See also ==
- 1981 in the United States
- List of American films of 1981
