= List of True Crime Network affiliates =

The following is a list of affiliates for True Crime Network, a digital subchannel network owned by Nexstar Media Group.

== Affiliates ==
List of True Crime Network affiliates
Media market	State/District	Station	Channel
Birmingham	Alabama	WABM-DT4	68.4
Huntsville	Alabama	WZDX-DT5	54.5
Mobile	Alabama	WFNA-DT3	55.3
Montgomery	Alabama	WALE-LD	17.1
Anchorage	Alaska	KTUU-DT2	2.2
Phoenix	Arizona	KPNX-DT3	12.3
Tucson	Arizona	KMSB-DT3	11.3
Fort Smith	Arkansas	KFLU-LD8	20.8
Little Rock	Arkansas	KTHV-DT3	11.3
Bakersfield	California	KBAK-DT4	29.4
Fresno	California	KVBC-LP5	13.5
Los Angeles	California	KMEX-DT4	34.4
Sacramento	California	KXTV-DT2	10.2
San Diego	California	KFMB-DT4	8.4
San Francisco	California	KFSF-DT5	66.5
Colorado Springs–Pueblo	Colorado	KXTU-LD3	57.3
Denver	Colorado	KUSA-DT3	9.3
Hartford–New Haven	Connecticut	WTIC-DT4	61.4
Washington	District of Columbia	WUSA-DT2	9.2
Gainesville	Florida	WCJB-DT5	20.5
Jacksonville	Florida	WTLV-DT3	12.3
Miami–Fort Lauderdale	Florida	WLTV-DT2	23.2
Orlando	Florida	WKCF-DT2	18.2
Tallahassee	Florida	WCTV-DT5	6.5
Tampa	Florida	WTSP-DT3	10.3
West Palm Beach	Florida	WPBF-DT3	25.3
Augusta	Georgia	WRDW-DT5	12.5
Atlanta	Georgia	WXIA-DT3	11.3
Columbus	Georgia	WGBP-DT6	66.6
Macon	Georgia	WMAZ-DT3	13.3
Savannah	Georgia	WSCG-DT2	35.2
Boise	Idaho	KTVB-DT3	7.3
Idaho Falls–Pocatello	Idaho	KPIF-DT9	15.9
Twin Falls	Idaho	KTFT-LD3	7.3
Chicago	Illinois	WGBO-DT4	66.4
Harrisburg	Illinois	WSIL-DT3	3.3
Moline	Illinois	WQAD-DT4	8.4
Rockford	Illinois	WREX-DT5	13.5
Springfield	Illinois	WRSP-DT2	55.2
Fort Wayne	Indiana	WISE-DT2	33.2
Indianapolis	Indiana	WTHR-DT4	13.4
Indianapolis	Indiana	WALV-CD2	46.2
South Bend	Indiana	WNDU-DT4	16.4
Cedar Rapids	Iowa	KWWL-DT5	7.5
Des Moines	Iowa	WOI-DT2	5.2
Topeka	Kansas	KTKA-DT4	49.4
Wichita	Kansas	KSNW-DT4	3.4
Louisville	Kentucky	WHAS-DT2	11.2
Lexington	Kentucky	WTVQ-DT3	36.3
Lafayette	Louisiana	KXKW-LD4	32.4
Monroe	Louisiana	KNOE-DT5	8.5
Monroe	Louisiana	KMCT-DT7	39.7
New Orleans	Louisiana	WWL-DT2	4.2
New Orleans	Louisiana	WUPL-DT4	54.4
Shreveport	Louisiana	KMSS-DT3	33.3
Bangor	Maine	WLBZ-DT2	2.2
Portland	Maine	WCSH-DT2	6.2
Baltimore	Maryland	WMJF-CD2	39.2
Boston	Massachusetts	WWJE-DT	50.1
Alpena	Michigan	WBKB-DT6	11.6
Detroit	Michigan	WADL-DT6	38.6
Flint–Saginaw–Bay City	Michigan	WAQP-DT10	49.10
Grand Rapids	Michigan	WZZM-DT3	13.3
Escanaba	Michigan	WJMN-DT6	3.6
Duluth	Minnesota	KDLH-DT2	3.2
Minneapolis–Saint Paul	Minnesota	KARE-DT3	11.3
Biloxi–Gulfport	Mississippi	WLOX-DT4	13.4
Kansas City	Missouri	KCWE-DT2	29.2
St. Louis	Missouri	KSDK-DT3	5.3
Springfield	Missouri	K26GS-D3	26.3
Springfield	Missouri	KYTV-DT5	3.5
Las Vegas	Nevada	KINC-DT4	15.4
Reno	Nevada	KREN-DT3	27.3
Atlantic City	New Jersey	WMGM-TV	40.1
Albuquerque	New Mexico	KOAT-DT3	7.3
Buffalo	New York	WGRZ-DT3	2.3
New York City	New York	WFTY-DT	67.1
New York City	New York	WFUT-DT2	68.2
Syracuse	New York	WSYR-DT5	9.5
Watertown	New York	WWTI-DT5	50.5
Charlotte	North Carolina	WCNC-DT2	36.2
Greensboro–Winston-Salem	North Carolina	WFMY-DT2	2.2
Greenville	North Carolina	WCTI-DT4	12.4
Fargo	North Dakota	WDAY-DT4	6.4
Grand Forks	North Dakota	WDAZ-DT4	8.4
Cleveland	Ohio	WKYC-DT2	3.2
Columbus	Ohio	WBNS-DT4	10.4
Dayton	Ohio	WRGT-DT5	45.5
Portsmouth	Ohio	WTZP-LD2	50.2
Toledo	Ohio	WTOL-DT2	11.2
Oklahoma City	Oklahoma	KFOR-DT3	4.3
Tulsa	Oklahoma	KGEB-DT7	53.7
Portland	Oregon	KGW-DT2	8.2
Philadelphia	Pennsylvania	WUVP-DT3	65.3
Pittsburgh	Pennsylvania	WPNT-DT4	22.4
Charleston	South Carolina	WTAT-DT2	24.2
Columbia	South Carolina	WLTX-DT2	19.2
Honea Path	South Carolina	WWYA-LD3	28.3
Myrtle Beach	South Carolina	WFXB-DT6	43.6
Chattanooga	Tennessee	WDSI-TV	61.1
Greeneville–Bristol	Tennessee	WEMT-DT5	39.5
Knoxville	Tennessee	WBIR-DT3	10.3
Memphis	Tennessee	WATN-DT5	24.5
Memphis	Tennessee	WQEK-LD5	36.5
Nashville	Tennessee	WZTV-DT4	17.4
Amarillo	Texas	KAUO-LD4	15.4
Austin	Texas	KVUE-DT3	24.3
Bryan–College Station	Texas	KAGS-LD4	23.4
Dallas–Fort Worth	Texas	WFAA-DT3	8.3
El Paso	Texas	KTFN-DT2	65.2
Houston	Texas	KHOU-DT3	11.3
Laredo	Texas	KGNS-DT5	8.5
Lubbock	Texas	KLCW-DT3	22.3
Odessa-Midland	Texas	KWES-DT3	9.3
San Angelo	Texas	KIDY-DT4	6.4
San Antonio	Texas	KENS-DT3	5.3
Waco	Texas	KCEN-DT4	6.4
Wichita Falls	Texas	KSWO-DT5	7.5
Salt Lake City	Utah	KUTH-DT5	32.5
Norfolk	Virginia	WVEC-DT2	13.2
Seattle	Washington	KING-DT2	5.2
Spokane	Washington	KREM-DT2	2.2
Huntington	West Virginia	WSAZ-DT5	3.5
Moorefield, West Virginia	West Virginia	W50BD-D2	50.2
Eau Claire	Wisconsin	WQOW-DT5	18.5
Green Bay	Wisconsin	WFRV-DT3	5.3
La Crosse	Wisconsin	WXOW-DT5	19.5
Madison	Wisconsin	WKOW-DT5	27.5
Milwaukee	Wisconsin	WISN-DT2	12.2
Wausau	Wisconsin	WAOW-DT5	9.5
