= LocusPoint Networks =

American television broadcast company

LocusPoint Networks LLC
- Company type: Private
- Industry: Broadcast television
- Founded: 2012
- Defunct: 2019
- Headquarters: Pleasanton, California, United States
- Key people: Ravi Patharlanka, President
- Owner: Blackstone Group (99%)
- Website: locuspointnetworks.com

LocusPoint Networks LLC was an owner of television stations in the United States. The company was 99% owned by The Blackstone Group. After selling off most of their in 2017 and 2018 in the Federal Communications Commission (FCC) spectrum auction and to other broadcasters, they owned one remaining station, WLEP-LD in Erie, Pennsylvania, whose license they turned in to the FCC effective February 12, 2019.

One of the company's acquisitions, WMGM-TV, was rumored to have been purchased only to be sold in a spectrum auction in 2015. When the FCC auction finally occurred LocusPoint failed to successfully win a bid to sell the station's spectrum to the FCC. On June 26, 2017, LocusPoint Networks agreed to sell WMGM-TV to Univision Communications, through its Univision Local Media subsidiary, for $6 million. The deal will make WMGM-TV a sister station to WUVP-DT and WFPA-CD.

On April 12, 2017, LocusPoint Networks, hired by the San Mateo Community College District to sell KCSM-TV in the spectrum auction, claimed fiscal mismanagement by school officials and administrators to fulfill their basic duties to facilitate the sale properly. The station was to be sold in the auction due to the college's $1 million annual losses. In turn, the District counter-sued LocusPoint and its partner, PricewaterhouseCoopers, for failure to enter KCSM-TV into the FCC auction. In September 2017 the San Mateo Community College District reached a deal to sell KCSM-TV to the Northern California Public Media owned KRCB. On October 24, 2017, LocusPoint filed an injunction to stop the sale, citing violations of provisions in the original contract governing sale rights should the auction not go forward, while the San Mateo Community College District maintained that LocusPoint's role in the failed auction voided the entirety of the contract. The lawsuits were settled in 2019, with the district receiving $5.5 million from PricewaterhouseCoopers and $4.5 million from LocusPoint, and KCSM-TV was sold to KRCB for an additional $12 million. The district did not have to pay anything to either PricewaterhouseCoopers or LocusPoint.

On April 13, 2017, the Federal Communications Commission (FCC) announced that LocusPoint's WLPH-CD and WQVC-CD were successful bidders in the spectrum auction. WLPH-CD, which had already been silent since LocusPoint acquired it in 2014, would be surrendering its license in exchange for $3,994,492 and WQVC-CD would be surrendering its license in exchange for $11,196,327. LocusPoint surrendered the licenses for both stations to the FCC for cancellation on August 8, 2017.

== Former stations ==
- Stations are arranged in alphabetical order by state and city of license.

Stations owned by LocusPoint Networks
Media market	State	Station	Purchased	Sold	Notes
San Francisco	California	KCNZ-CD	2012	2017	
Miami	Florida	WLPH-CD	2014	2017	(Note: Ceased operations on this date.)
Orlando	Florida	WRCF-CD	2013	2017	
Plano	Illinois	WLPD-CD	2013	2018	
Towson	Maryland	WMJF-CD	2013	2018	
Detroit	Michigan	WHPS-CD	2014	2018	
Detroit	Michigan	WDWO-CD	2013	2018	
Atlantic City	New Jersey	WMGM-TV	2014	2017	
Edison	New Jersey	WDVB-CD	2013	2018	
Buffalo	New York	WBNF-CD	^{1}	2016	
Erie	Pennsylvania	WLEP-LD	2015	2019	
Greensburg	Pennsylvania	WQVC-CD	2015	2017	
Milwaukee	Wisconsin	WMKE-CD	2014	2018	

- ^{1}Translator of TCT owned-and-operated station WNYB, Sold to HME Equity Fund II on February 19, 2016.
