= WACP =

Television station in Atlantic City, New Jersey

- Atlantic City, New Jersey; Philadelphia, Pennsylvania; United States
- City: Atlantic City, New Jersey
- Channels: Digital: 4 (VHF); Virtual: 4

Programming
- Affiliations: 4.1: TCT; for others, see § Subchannels

Ownership
- Owner: Total Christian Television; (Faith Broadcasting Network, Inc.)

History
- First air date: June 18, 2012
- Former affiliations: Independent (2012–2021)
- Call sign meaning: Atlantic City and Philadelphia

Technical information
- Licensing authority: FCC
- Facility ID: 189358
- ERP: 34 kW
- HAAT: 258.4 m (848 ft)
- Transmitter coordinates: 39°44′4″N 74°50′27″W

Links
- Public license information: Public file; LMS
- Website: www.tct.tv

WACP (channel 4) is a religious television station licensed to Atlantic City, New Jersey, United States, serving South Jersey and the Philadelphia television market. The station is owned by Total Christian Television (TCT). WACP's studios are located in Millville, and its transmitter is located in Waterford Works.

== History ==
On December 17, 2009, the FCC proposed the allotment of two VHF allocations: one on channel 4 to Atlantic City, New Jersey, and another on channel 5 to Seaford, Delaware. On January 13, 2011, the FCC announced a license auction for February 15 of that year for the two VHF channel allocations. On February 26, 2011, Richland Towers–created Western Pacific Broadcast LLC won the federal auction to acquire the two full-power VHF station licenses. On May 4, 2011, the FCC granted Western Pacific Broadcast a construction permit to build a digital transmitter for the new station, using the channel 4 license. On June 23, 2011, an application was filed into the FCC to assign the "WACP" callsign to the station license. The construction permit to build the WACP transmitter was approved by the Federal Communications Commission on February 13, 2012.

On April 18, 2012, Richland Towers Management Waterford purchased an existing transmitter tower in Waterford Works (located at 1813 Arrowhead Drive) from Univision Communications, who acquired the site on May 15, 2002, as part of that company's acquisition of USA Broadcasting's television stations, including Philadelphia's WUVP-TV (channel 65). On or around June 6, 2012, WACP began testing its broadcast signal by running a tower camera feed from CBS affiliate WIAT in Birmingham, Alabama, along with a WACP station ID on the upper right portion of the screen; this was later replaced by a full-screen station ID that began to be shown on-air on June 24, 2012. The FCC granted the WACP station license on July 9, 2012.

On October 23, 2012, Comcast Xfinity added WACP on cable channel 4 in much of its Philadelphia service area, displacing ABC owned-and-operated station WPVI-TV to Comcast channel 6 (in correspondence with the station's virtual channel) in certain areas (though the reasoning for WPVI maintaining the cable channel 4 location, to prevent co-channel interference with the station's signal, was no longer an issue after improvements to the cable system in the 1990s).

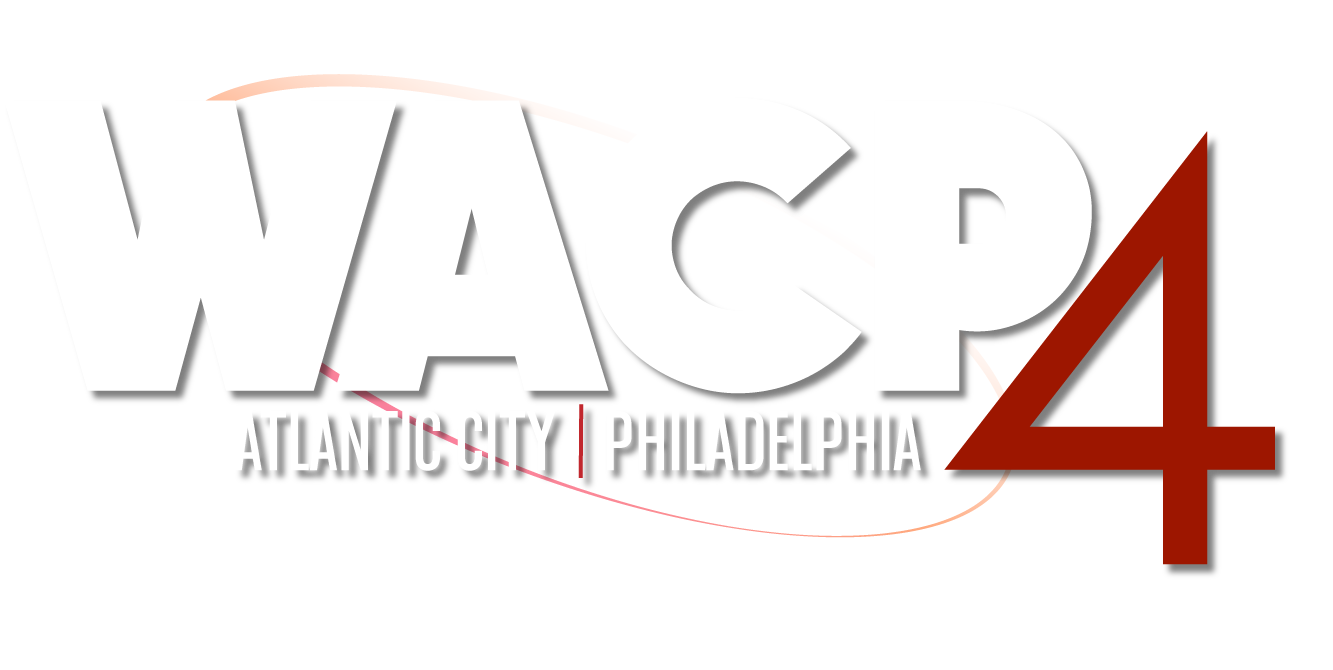
Former logo for WACP as an independent station.

WACP's programming featured a mix of infomercials, home shopping shows and children's programming following E/I requirements outlined by the Federal Communications Commission (FCC). The station carried local newscasts that were produced by Millville-based SNJ Today from 2015 until 2019. The newscasts were maintained largely by the former staff of WMGM-TV's news department. WMGM and WACP simulcast the newscasts until the former announced its sale to Univision in 2017.

On July 1, 2019, WACP began to simulcast News 12 New Jersey from 6 to 9 a.m. on weekdays.

On August 31, 2021, Marion, Illinois–based Total Christian Television announced that it would purchase WACP for $10 million. The sale was completed on November 1.

== Subchannels ==
The station's signal is multiplexed:

Subchannels of WACP
Subchannel	Res.	Short name	Programming
4.1	720p	WACP HD	TCT
4.2	480i	SBN	SonLife
4.3	480i	HSTV	Healing Streams TV
4.5	480i	Jewelry	Jewelry TV
4.6	480i	The Fam	The Family Channel
4.7	480i	GDT	Infomercials
4.8	480i	DIYA	Diya TV
4.9	480i	ONTV4U	OnTV4U
4.10	480i	BizTV	Biz TV (4:3)
