= WQLL =

- Pikesville, Maryland; United States
- Broadcast area: Baltimore, Maryland
- Frequency: 1370 kHz
- Branding: Fox Sports Baltimore

Programming
- Language: English
- Format: Sports radio
- Network: Fox Sports Radio
- Affiliations: VSiN

Ownership
- Owner: M-10 Broadcasting, Inc.
- Operator: iHeartMedia, Inc.
- Sister stations: WCBM

History
- First air date: April 5, 1955
- Former call signs: WEBB (1955–1992); WHLP (1992–1993); WWLG (1993–2006); WVIE (2006–2012)
- Former frequencies: 1360 kHz (1955–2002)
- Call sign meaning: WQLL(Cool)

Technical information
- Licensing authority: FCC
- Facility ID: 27691
- Class: B
- Power: 50,000 watts (day); 24,000 watts (night)
- Transmitter coordinates: 39°26′23.4″N 76°21′18.9″W (day); 39°24′29.4″N 76°46′30.9″W (night)
- Translator: 99.9 W260BV (Aberdeen)

Links
- Public license information: Public file; LMS
- Webcast: Listen live
- Website: foxsportsbaltimore.com

WQLL (1370 AM) is a radio station broadcasting a sports radio format. Licensed to Pikesville, Maryland, United States, a northwest suburb of the city in Baltimore County, it serves the Baltimore metropolitan area.

The station is currently owned by M-10 Broadcasting, Inc. and features programming from Fox Sports Radio.

== History ==
The station signed on originally in 1955 as WEBB on 1360 kHz on the AM radio dial. It established a well-known reputation in the city's black population with its dynamic, memorable DJs and pounding soul, blues, the Motown sound and other increasingly fractured sounds of developing rock music. In 1970, it was sold to famous entertainer and funk / soul music performer James Brown, (1933–2006), (later known as the "Godfather of Soul"!) who instituted an "Urban Contemporary" format and continued its popularity and competition among Baltimore's Afro-American black community. As a result of a bankruptcy proceeding, Brown sold WEBB to Dorothy E. Brunson, (1939–2011), in 1979. Brunson had formerly been a radio executive with the Inner City Broadcasting Corporation of New York City since 1973, where they owned five radio stations. Brunson would later sell her radio stations eleven years later, including WEBB, in 1990, in order to provide funds with her partnership/syndicate for her newly-purchased UHF television station, WGTW-TV (formerly WKBS - Channel 48) in Philadelphia becoming the first African-American woman to own a television station in America. The station's call sign was changed briefly to WHLP "Jobs Radio" in 1992, where help wanted ads were read on-air. The station received national attention as the first (possibly only) radio station dedicated to helping listeners find jobs. The jobs radio format was short-lived, and the call letters were changed to WWLG in 1993. WWLG-AM operated with an "adult standards" format which included big band and swing music and some early jazz, first popularized in the 1930s and 1940s which had not been heard regularly over Baltimore's airwaves for several decades except for a short interlude earlier on competing WAYE (AM 860) in the late 1980s which then had billed itself as "Big Band 86". The station changed broadcast frequency a decade later from its longtime position on the dial at 1360 kHz to 1370 kHz on July 22, 2002, which allowed it to operate with increased power but with highly directional signals from separate day and night transmitter sites.

Serving as the only regional station playing the "Great Depression" and World War II era music remembered by what came to be known as "the Greatest Generation", the station's hosts/DJ's and publicity staff encouraged and supported a number of unofficial fan clubs, singers and bands/orchestra followers, organizing social events, dances and musical concerts in the area, including touring national combos and several well-known local performers such as Zim Zemarel and His Orchestra.

After 13 years with the "big band"/"swing" musical programming (an unusually long time in the frequently unstable, changeable radio broadcasting industry), in June 2006, WWLG became WVIE, billed as "V-1370, The Voice", a talk station aimed at women with programming from Joy Browne, Laura Ingraham, Tammy Bruce, Laura Schlessinger, and longtime TV talk show host Sally Jessy Raphael. By late 2007, Bruce and Raphael had been dropped in favor of non-female oriented / general talk radio programming with conservative viewpoints such as Mancow Muller, Glenn Beck, and Phil Hendrie. On September 8, 2008, WVIE moved to a sports talk format with programming from Fox Sports Radio

After two and a half years, in May 2011, WVIE began moving away from the sports format, adding the long-form news/features program "America's Morning News" (syndicated by Talk Radio Network) in morning drive time from 5 to 9 a.m., and returned to the "V-1370" branding. That July, WVIE dropped its locally oriented sports talk shows in favor of carrying "America's Radio News", an all-news network, complementing its sister conservative talk station WCBM (680); nighttime and weekend programming were still provided by Fox Sports Radio.

A little more than a year later, August 6, 2012, WVIE changed its format to oldies/classic hits, branded as "Q-1370", returning a bit to its previous years from 1993-2006 as WWLG with the 1930s and 1940s era music, only now also supplemented with the tunes from the next two decades of the 1950s and 1960s of the "rock and roll" era with what became known as "oldies" (also occasionally known as "goodies"), with now antique and classic vinyl 45 rpm records. WQLL later added UMBC Retrievers men's basketball games. On August 7, 2012, the station's callsign was officially changed to WQLL. In September 2013, WQLL added a new translator, W260BV, broadcasting from White Marsh, Maryland in eastern Baltimore County on 99.9 FM and rebranded itself as "Q-1370 AM & 99.9 FM" with simultaneous broadcasting on both wavelengths. On May 16, 2016, WQLL added a live, local morning drive program headed by Baltimore radio veteran Steve Rouse ("Rouse and Company").

In June 2020, WQLL laid off its airstaff and switched to Westwood One's syndicated feed of classic hits. This was followed by the signing of a local marketing agreement with iHeartMedia, which flipped the station to its fledgling all-news Black Information Network on August 31. After six years with BIN, iHeartMedia moved its programming to WWIN (1400 AM), and WQLL flipped back to Fox Sports Radio.
