= WGTW-TV =

Television station in Millville, New Jersey

- Millville–Atlantic City, New Jersey; Philadelphia, Pennsylvania; United States
- City: Millville, New Jersey (Note: Originally licensed to Burlington, New Jersey; moved to Millville in 2017.)
- Channels: Digital: 36 (UHF), shared with WMGM-TV; Virtual: 48

Programming
- Affiliations: 48.1: TBN; for others, see § Subchannels

Ownership
- Owner: Trinity Broadcasting Network; (Trinity Broadcasting of Texas, Inc.)

History
- First air date: August 13, 1992
- Former channel numbers: Analog: 48 (UHF, 1992–2009); Digital: 27 (UHF, 2001–2017)
- Former affiliations: Independent (1992–2004)
- Call sign meaning: "Good Television to Watch"

Technical information
- Licensing authority: FCC
- Facility ID: 7623
- ERP: 205 kW
- HAAT: 126.5 m (415 ft)
- Transmitter coordinates: 39°7′28.3″N 74°45′54.5″W

Links
- Public license information: Public file; LMS
- Website: www.tbn.org

WGTW-TV (channel 48) is a television station licensed to Millville, New Jersey, United States, owned by the Trinity Broadcasting Network (TBN). It previously served the Philadelphia, Pennsylvania, television market, but can now only be received over-the-air in South Jersey. The station's transmitter is shared with True Crime Network affiliate WMGM-TV (channel 40) and is located along Avalon Boulevard in the Swainton section of Middle Township, New Jersey.

Channel 48 was originally allocated to Burlington, New Jersey, and was used by WKBS-TV from 1965 to 1983. That independent station folded in 1983 as a result of the dissolution of its owner, Field Communications. Nearly immediately, applicants filed to the Federal Communications Commission (FCC) to build a new station on the channel; in 1986, the FCC selected Black radio station owner Dorothy Brunson. Appeals and delays in securing financing delayed the station's start until August 1992. It broadcast primarily older movies and sitcoms as well as some local programs; it ran on a limited budget compared to similar stations in the market.

TBN acquired WGTW-TV from Brunson in 2004, mainly because it could use its must-carry carriage election to assure low-channel availability of TBN on all area pay television providers. It continued to maintain a physical presence in the Philadelphia area for another 15 years, most of that time from a studio in Folcroft, Pennsylvania. In the 2017 incentive auction, TBN sold the station's spectrum; it began sharing the channel of WMGM-TV, requiring a city of license change and removing its over-the-air signal from most of the Philadelphia metropolitan area.

== History ==
=== Prior use of channel 48 in Burlington, New Jersey ===
The channel 48 allocation, which had been located at Burlington, New Jersey, until 2017, was first occupied by WKBS-TV, an independent station founded by Kaiser Broadcasting that broadcast from September 1965 to August 1983. For years, WKBS-TV was a popular independent station, but it began to lose market share to WTAF-TV (channel 29, now WTXF-TV) and WPHL-TV (channel 17) by the early 1980s. WKBS-TV's final owner Field Communications, which was in the process of being broken up due to disagreements among its controlling family, could not find a buyer and opted to surrender the station's license and liquidate the station's assets in lieu of selling WKBS-TV as a going concern, even though it still turned a profit.

=== A new 48 ===
With WKBS-TV having surrendered its license, the doors were open for applicants to file to build a new station on the channel. The major-market allocation attracted intense interest, with the Federal Communications Commission (FCC) designating 11 bids for comparative hearing in 1984. Bidders included Cornerstone Television, a Christian broadcaster from Pittsburgh; Dorothy Brunson, a Black radio executive and station owner from Baltimore; and BCT Communications, which included former CBS president Arthur R. Taylor. The Spanish International Network, which also applied, was ruled to already be at the FCC's seven-station limit.

By the time the hearing began in October, the field had thinned to seven, which had attempted to reach a settlement but failed in doing so. The independent market also rapidly shifted, with the relaunch of two subscription television outlets into general-entertainment independents while hearing was underway: WGBS-TV (channel 57, now WPSG) and Vineland, New Jersey–based WSJT-TV (channel 65, now WUVP-DT). This prompted two bidders—BCT and Burlington TV—to take an offer from competing Adelphi Broadcasting, a women-owned firm, and drop out in late 1985.

While Adelphi was seen as the frontrunner, FCC administrative law judge Joseph Chachkin disagreed. Calling its corporate structure "clearly a sham" for the way Black ownership interests were structured—and dismissing another applicant on similar grounds—he selected the Brunson application in February 1986. Brunson committed to selling her three radio stations to move to Burlington and build channel 48.

Nearly immediately, two losing applicants appealed the Brunson initial decision to the FCC. The commission upheld the decision in early 1987; the last appeals stretched until 1990, when the U.S. Supreme Court refused to hear the case. In 1989, Brunson purchased a facility on North Broad Street; it had been heavily vandalized and required extensive work to be refitted for use. To raise capital, she liquidated the radio stations she owned. Brunson struggled to get lenders to take her seriously; in 1998, she told The Philadelphia Tribune, "They blamed not lending money on inexperience. Now I'm not a rocket scientist, but I know the real reason was that they hadn't seen anything like me before and were scared to take a chance."

=== The Brunson years ===
I don't spend the kind of money they have; I don't have the kinds of stats that they have, and yet we make a very, very decent showing and do very well in terms of maximizing our effectiveness.

— Dorothy Brunson

With little fanfare, WGTW-TV began broadcasting on August 13, 1992. Brunson opted to carve a small niche and build the station up as opposed to a "fully grown" station strategy in the mold of Milton Grant, whose WGBS-TV had been quickly forced into bankruptcy; most of its programming was in the public domain. Brunson focused on what she called "good television", which consisted of classic movies and off-network syndicated reruns and built a core audience for WGTW; by 1999, the mix of programming changed to include 40 percent first-run syndicated shows including The Dating Game and Acapulco Heat. This also helped to make the station's median viewer younger.

In 1997, WGTW generated some $7 million in revenue, a fraction of other local stations. In the late 1990s, Brunson pushed the station into local program production, with new studios on Main Street in Manayunk. Series produced by channel 48 included Another View, a local newsmagazine, as well as a health show and a talk show. In 2002, channel 48 began airing 48 Update, an hour-long 7 p.m. newscast produced by local college journalism and communications students; students were paid by the story to contribute to the program, keeping costs down. It also debuted Urban X-Pressions, a music video show.

=== TBN ownership ===
In 2004, the Trinity Broadcasting Network (TBN) was looking to acquire stations in major markets as part of a larger strategy of purchasing full-power stations to acquire must-carry carriage on that market's cable systems. TBN offered to purchase WGTW from Brunson, an offer that was accepted; TBN paid $7 million and assumed $41 million in debts from Brunson. On October 1, 2004, the sale was closed and TBN took over all operations of the station. The acquisition of WGTW-TV was TBN's second attempt to purchase a station in the Philadelphia market; in 1991, a TBN affiliate, National Minority TV, had received FCC approval to purchase WTGI-TV (channel 61, now WPPX-TV) in Wilmington, Delaware, but questions regarding the buyer's ownership structure led to the deal unraveling.

TBN replaced the station's programming—which included martial arts and professional wrestling shows and the reality series Cheaters—with its own. It maintained the Manayunk studio for a time, producing a public affairs show called Joy in Our Town for the Philadelphia area. The station soon relocated its studio to Folcroft, where TBN purchased two buildings totaling 24,000 square feet (2,200 m^{2}) in 2005.

In 2019, TBN closed 27 of its local station facilities and put them up for sale. This action followed the FCC's repeal of the "Main Studio Rule", which required full-service TV stations like WGTW-TV to maintain facilities in or near their communities of license.

=== Broadcast incentive auction ===
Trinity Broadcasting entered WGTW-TV's broadcast frequency into the FCC's spectrum auction, the results of which were released in April 2017. TBN received $80,807,689 for WGTW-TV's spectrum; as a result, the station relinquished its RF channel 27 frequency and moved to channel 36, where it entered into a channel-sharing arrangement with WMGM-TV, licensed to Wildwood, New Jersey. TBN additionally requested to have WGTW's community of license moved from Burlington to Millville, New Jersey, as WMGM-TV's transmitter location near Avalon, New Jersey, would have left WGTW unable to service Burlington with a significantly viewable over-the-air signal. The move of WGTW's transmitter to Avalon from its original location in Roxborough significantly reduced the station's signal in Philadelphia and most of the Philadelphia metropolitan area. The FCC approved the license move from Burlington to Millville on September 26, 2017.

== Technical information ==
=== Subchannels ===
Subchannels of WMGM-TV and WGTW-TV
License	Subchannel	Res.	Short name	Programming
WMGM-TV	40.1	480i	CRIME	True Crime Network
WMGM-TV	40.2	480i	GREAT	Great (4:3)
WMGM-TV	40.3	720p	WUVP-HD	Univision (WUVP-DT)
WGTW-TV	48.1	720p	TBN-HD	TBN
WGTW-TV	48.2	480i	TVDEALS	Infomercials
WGTW-TV	48.3	480i	Inspire	TBN Inspire
WGTW-TV	48.4	480i	ONTV4U	OnTV4U (infomercials) (4:3)

Simulcast of subchannels of another station

=== Analog-to-digital conversion ===
TBN-owned full-power stations permanently ceased analog transmissions on April 16, 2009.
