= Dorothy Brunson =

African-American broadcaster (1939–2011)

- Born: March 13, 1939; Tattnall County, Georgia, U.S.
- Died: July 31, 2011 (aged 72); Baltimore, Maryland
- Education: SUNY Empire State College
- Occupation: Broadcaster

Dorothy Edwards Brunson (March 13, 1939 – July 31, 2011) was a notable African-American broadcaster.

Between 1973 and 1979, Brunson was an executive with Inner City Broadcasting Corporation, which owned WLIB and WBLS in New York City.

== Career ==
After leaving Inner City Broadcasting, Brunson was the first African-American woman to own a radio station, WEBB (1360 AM) in Baltimore, Maryland, purchased from entertainer James Brown in 1979. She also later purchased radio stations in Atlanta and Wilmington, North Carolina.

Brunson would sell off her radio stations eleven years later in 1990 to provide funding to establish WGTW-TV (Channel 48), licensed to Burlington, New Jersey, a suburb of Philadelphia, to the east across the Delaware River, becoming the first African-American woman to establish a television station. She later sold WGTW-TV to the Trinity Broadcasting Network in 2004, as the station was experiencing additional hardships with limited financial resources in acquiring additional quality syndicated programming.

== Death ==
Brunson died from ovarian cancer at Mercy Medical Center in Baltimore on July 31, 2011, at age 72.
