= WFPA-CD =

Television station in Philadelphia

- Philadelphia, Pennsylvania; United States
- Channels: Digital: 35 (UHF); Virtual: 28
- Branding: UniMás Philadelphia

Programming
- Affiliations: 28.1: UniMás; for others, see § Subchannels

Ownership
- Owner: TelevisaUnivision; (WXTV License Partnership, G.P.)
- Sister stations: WUVP-DT, WMGM-TV

History
- First air date: June 10, 1981
- Former call signs: W35AB (1981–1995); WXTV-LP (1995–2001); WFPA-CA (2001–2015)
- Former channel numbers: Analog: 35 (UHF, 1981–1990), 28 (UHF, 1990–2015); Digital: 28 (UHF, 2015–2019)
- Former affiliations: SIN/Univision (via WXTV, 1981–2002)
- Call sign meaning: TeleFutura Pennsylvania (former name of UniMás)

Technical information
- Licensing authority: FCC
- Facility ID: 74216
- Class: CD
- ERP: 15 kW
- HAAT: 375.8 m (1,233 ft)
- Transmitter coordinates: 40°2′30.1″N 75°14′10.1″W

Links
- Public license information: Public file; LMS
- Website: UniMás TV website

WFPA-CD (channel 28) is a low-power, Class A television station in Philadelphia, Pennsylvania, United States, broadcasting the Spanish-language network UniMás. It is owned and operated by TelevisaUnivision alongside Vineland, New Jersey–licensed Univision station WUVP-DT (channel 65) and Wildwood, New Jersey–licensed True Crime Network affiliate WMGM-TV (channel 40). The three stations share studios on North Delsea Drive in Vineland; WFPA-CD's transmitter is located in the Roxborough section of Philadelphia.

== History ==
The station originally operated as a repeater of New York City's Univision owned-and-operated station, WXTV. It was first licensed as a translator, W35AB, operating on UHF channel 35. After WYBE was granted a license to operate a full-power station on channel 35, the translator moved to channel 28 and was ultimately relicensed as a low-power station, WXTV-LP (although the station was instead branded as Univision 42). In 2002, Univision Communications acquired WUVP (channel 65), and moved its programming there. Channel 28 began to air programming from the then-new TeleFutura network (which relaunched as UniMás in January 2013), and its call letters were changed to WFPA-CA.

In June 2006, the station was added to Philadelphia area Comcast systems on digital cable channel 251. WFPA is also available to DirecTV customers as part of the Philadelphia local channel package, as well as on FiOS in widescreen SD via WUVP-DT 65.2.

In some areas of the market, especially those north of Philadelphia, WFPA's signal causes some reception issues with the digital signal of New York City's WNBC, which also broadcasts its digital signal on channel 35 (remapped to virtual channel 4).

On June 3, 2015, the station was licensed for digital operation and changed its call sign to WFPA-CD.

== Subchannels ==
The station's signal is multiplexed:

Subchannels of WFPA-CD
Subchannel	Res.	Short name	Programming
28.1	720p	WFPA-CD	UniMás
28.2	480i	get	Great
28.3	480i	Quest	Quest
28.4	480i	MSGold	MovieSphere Gold
28.5	480i	BT2	Infomercials
