= WMGM-TV =

Television station in Wildwood, New Jersey

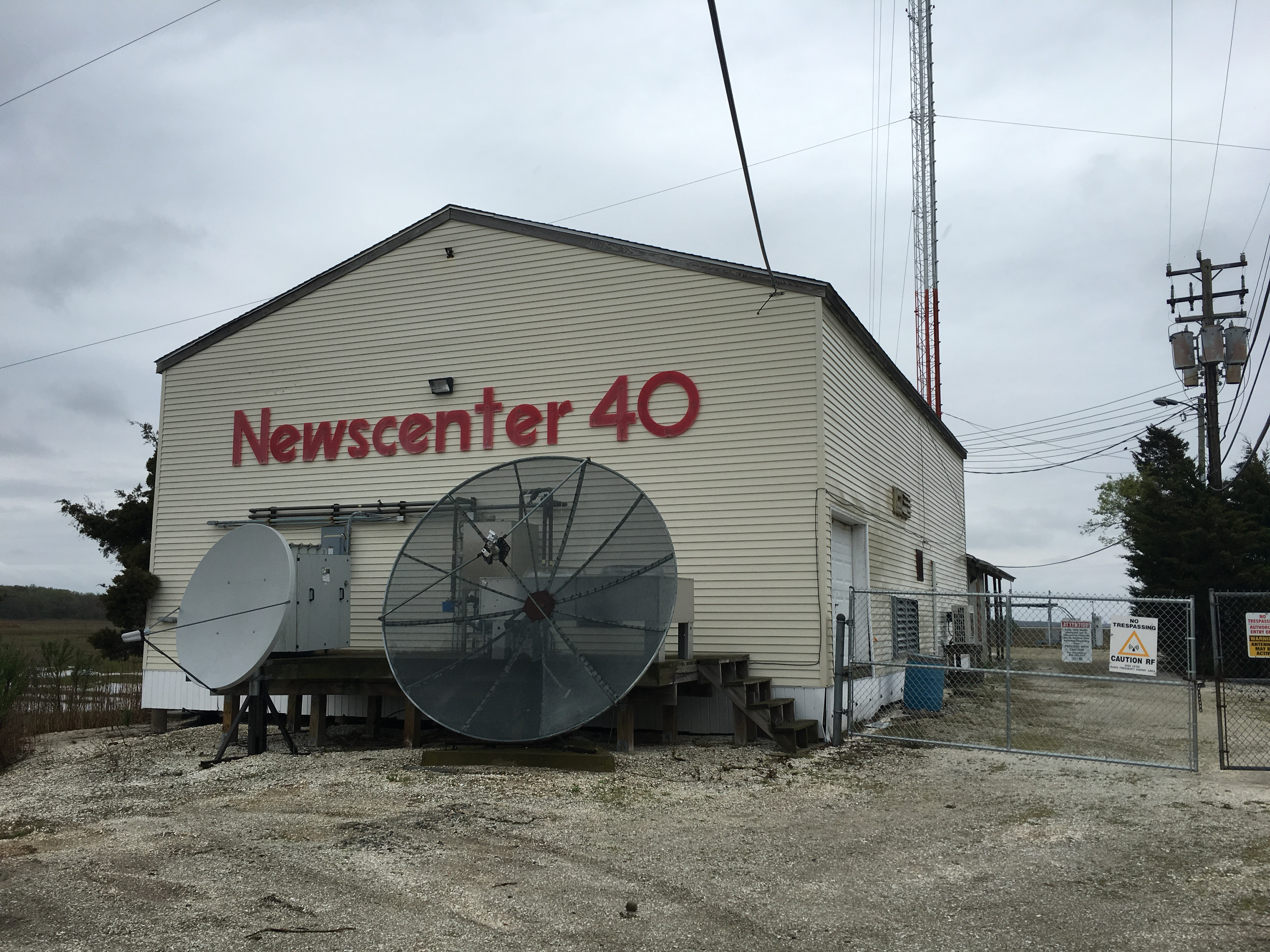
- The WMGM-TV transmitter facility outside Avalon, New Jersey
- Wildwood–Atlantic City, New Jersey; Philadelphia, Pennsylvania; United States
- City: Wildwood, New Jersey
- Channels: Digital: 36 (UHF), shared with WGTW-TV; Virtual: 40

Programming
- Affiliations: 40.1: True Crime Network; 40.2: Great; 40.3: Univision

Ownership
- Owner: TelevisaUnivision; (Univision Local Media, Inc.)
- Sister stations: WFPA-CD, WUVP-DT

History
- First air date: January 25, 1966
- Former call signs: WCMC-TV (1966–1981); WAAT (1981–1984)
- Former channel numbers: Analog: 40 (UHF, 1966–2009)
- Former affiliations: NBC (1966–2014); SSN (2015); SonLife (January–August 2016); Independent (August 2016–2017)
- Call sign meaning: Originates from its former sister station WMGM as a tribute to the former and completely unrelated New York City station WMGM which was owned by the Metro-Goldwyn-Mayer film studio

Technical information
- Licensing authority: FCC
- Facility ID: 61111
- ERP: 205 kW
- HAAT: 126.5 m (415 ft)
- Transmitter coordinates: 39°7′28.3″N 74°45′54.5″W
- Translator(s): WUVP-DT 65.3 Vineland, NJ

Links
- Public license information: Public file; LMS

WMGM-TV (channel 40) is a television station licensed to Wildwood, New Jersey, United States, affiliated with the True Crime Network. It is owned by TelevisaUnivision alongside Vineland, New Jersey–licensed Univision owned-and-operated station WUVP-DT (channel 65) and Philadelphia-based low-power, Class A UniMás outlet WFPA-CD (channel 28). The stations share studios on North Delsea Drive in Vineland; WMGM-TV's transmitter is located along Avalon Boulevard in Swainton.

WMGM-TV is officially considered part of the Philadelphia television market but primarily serves southeastern New Jersey, including Atlantic City. In addition to its own digital signal, WMGM-TV is simulcast on WUVP's third digital subchannel (65.3) from a transmitter in the Roxborough section of Philadelphia; this makes WMGM-TV's programming available over the air throughout the entire Philadelphia market.

WMGM-TV was previously an affiliate of NBC, and was the only major network affiliate located within New Jersey. As such, the station's coverage area overlapped with the network's owned-and-operated station in Philadelphia, WCAU (channel 10) as well as Philadelphia's previous NBC affiliate, KYW-TV (channel 3, now a CBS owned-and-operated station) and the network's New York City flagship WNBC (channel 4). WMGM-TV's affiliation with NBC ended on December 31, 2014. The station aired various digital multicast networks, and operated as an independent, for periods after the loss of NBC. Since its acquisition by Univision, the station has carried the multicast services Justice Network (now True Crime Network) and GetTV, as well as Univision via WUVP-DT.

== History ==
The station first signed on the air on January 25, 1966, known as WCMC-TV (meaning Cape May County). It was owned by Jersey Cape Broadcasting, along with the WCMC radio stations (1230 AM and 100.7 FM, now WZXL). The station initially could not get a direct network feed from NBC, forcing station engineers to switch to and from the signal of KYW-TV (channel 3) in Philadelphia for network programming. During the station's early years, even when NBC went to full-time color programming, the station still broadcast its local programming in black and white. WCMC-TV was sold to South Jersey Radio in 1977, and changed its call letters first to WAAT on April 27, 1981, and then to the current WMGM-TV on April 12, 1984, to match co-owned WMGM radio (103.7 FM). Under South Jersey Radio, channel 40 was able to obtain its own NBC affiliate feed. Upon the death of owner Howard Green in 2002, the stations were eventually sold to Access.1 Communications.

For many years, the station operated a low-powered repeater, WMGM-LP on VHF channel 7, to serve Atlantic City itself. On July 3, 2006, WMGM-LP fell silent when a fire struck its transmitter building. The building also housed the transmitters for Atlantic City's WMGM radio as well as Pleasantville's WOND (1400 AM) and WTKU-FM (98.3). While WMGM radio began broadcasting from WPUR (107.3 FM)'s auxiliary facilities atop the Trump Taj Mahal casino, the AM stations and WMGM-LP remained dark, leaving many Atlantic City residents without clear reception of NBC programs over-the-air. However, the on-air signals were eventually brought back.

Until WCAU became an NBC owned-and-operated station in September 1995, people in much of the New Jersey side of the Philadelphia market could watch the entire NBC schedule on WMGM-TV, as KYW-TV (which later became a CBS owned-and-operated station as a result of a 1994 affiliation deal involving two other Westinghouse-owned stations) preempted many of NBC's daytime programs as well as other shows. WMGM was one of the few affiliates not to carry the Sunday edition of The Today Show.

=== Acquisition by LocusPoint Networks ===
On October 10, 2013, Access.1 Communications agreed to sell WMGM to LocusPoint Networks for $6 million; WMGM would be LocusPoint's second station in the Philadelphia market, as the company was also in the process of acquiring WPHA-CD. As part of the deal, Access.1 would continue to manage WMGM. However, the deal was met with public controversy, over concerns that LocusPoint was only buying WMGM so it could auction off the station's license and spectrum during the FCC's 2015 spectrum incentive auction. Indeed, the company does not describe itself as a broadcaster, but as an "early stage wireless communications company". Stations in close proximity to major markets (in WMGM's case, Philadelphia) have been considered potentially valuable at auction, leaving the fate of WMGM in jeopardy. In response to the concerns (which also included viewers establishing a Save NBC 40 website), LocusPoint co-founder Bill deKay stated that they planned to continue operating the station as an NBC affiliate. The sale was completed on January 28, 2014. (WMGM was ultimately not sold in the auction.)

=== Loss of NBC affiliation ===
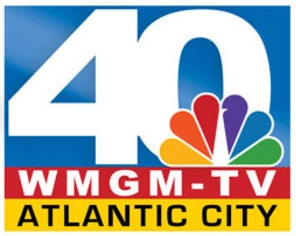
Final logo used under the NBC affiliation from 2003-2014

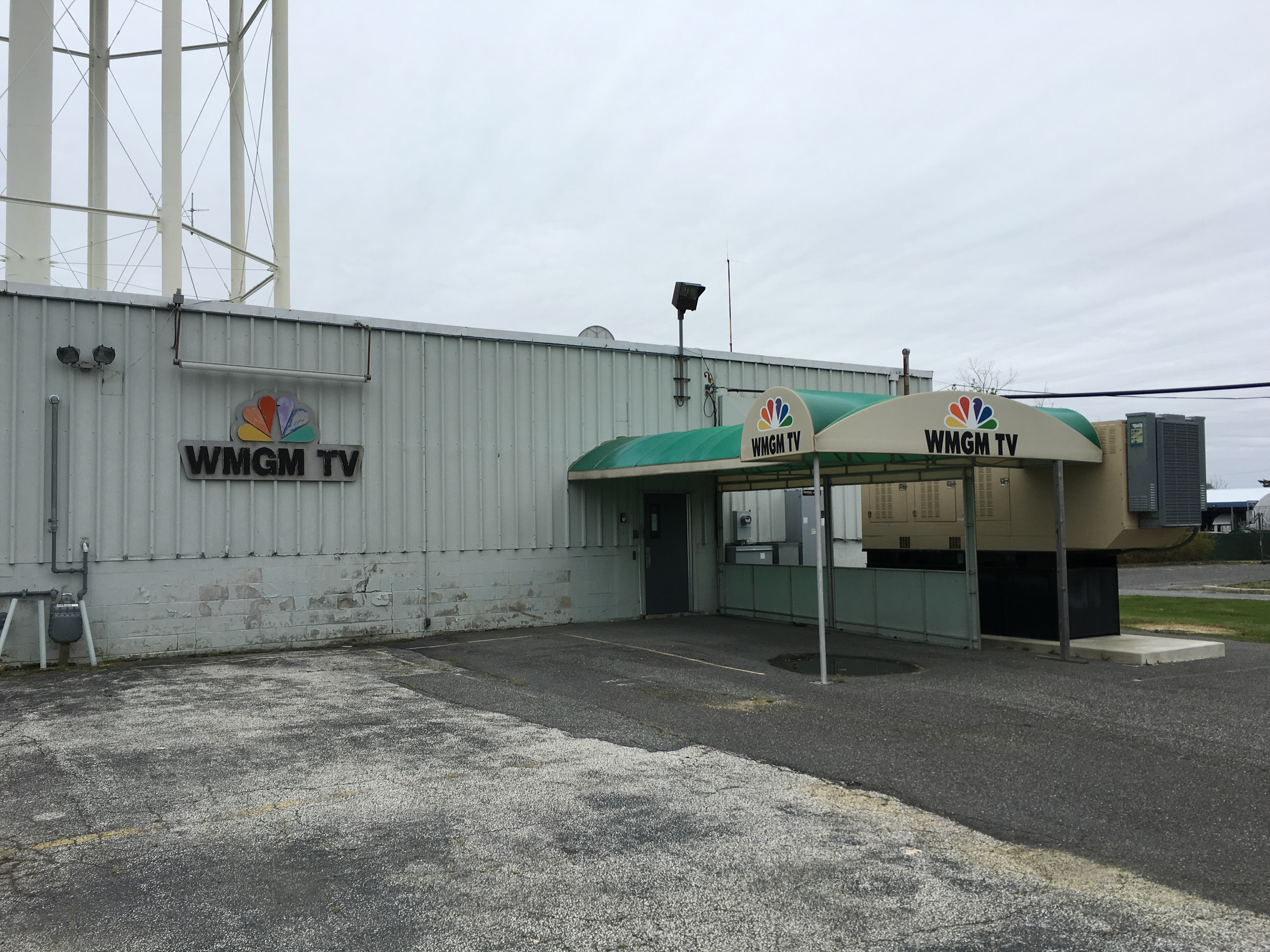
The former WMGM-TV NBC studio in Linwood, New Jersey

On April 16, 2014, Broadcasting & Cable reported that WMGM-TV would lose its NBC affiliation at the end of 2014, at the conclusion of a two-year extension of the station's most recent affiliation contract (which expired at the end of 2012). The station's former general manager, Ron Smith, claimed that the move was a result of NBCUniversal and its parent company Comcast wanting to protect WCAU. Smith argued that the loss of the NBC affiliation would make it difficult for WMGM to continue operating. The loss of NBC also coincided with the end of Access.1's management agreement with LocusPoint Networks. In addition to the Philadelphia region, NBC also had an owned-and-operated station in Washington, D.C. (WHAG-TV served western Maryland, which was also served via WRC-TV), and an affiliate in Salt Lake City, Utah (KENV served northeastern Nevada, which was also served via KSL-TV); both of those areas would go on to lose their secondary affiliates within the next few years.

In July 2014, WMGM-TV introduced the "Friends of 40 Summer Membership Club" in which viewers contribute money in return for benefits such as station merchandise, discounts, and invitations to its outings; this form of fundraising is more commonly associated with public broadcasting. According to general manager J. Roger Powe III, "The membership club allows all the folks who have been loyal and supportive to keep engaged in a more intimate fashion;" while some of the money raised goes to the station's operations, much of it is used to pay for the club's benefits. As WMGM remained a commercial, for-profit station until December 31, 2014, contributions to the club were not tax-deductible, unlike with public broadcasting stations.

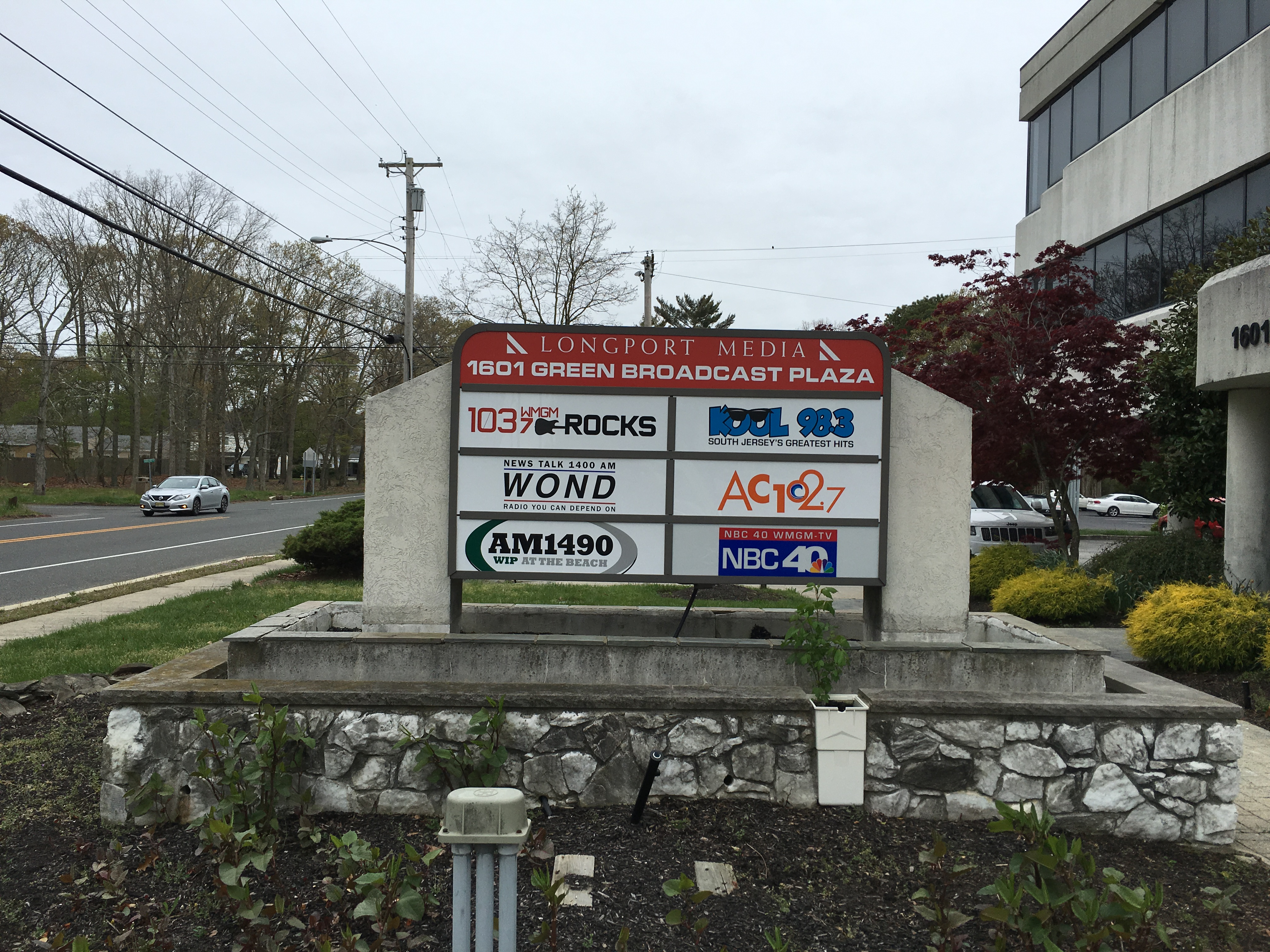
The former WMGM-TV NBC sign outside the studio in Linwood, New Jersey

In September 2014, it was reported that the WMGM-TV studio facilities had been put up for sale; at the time, a station spokesman stated that despite the action the station would remain in operation into 2015. The following month, the FCC pushed back the spectrum auction to 2016. On December 9, 2014, Access.1 made a statement on WMGM's website, indicating that it was planning to "continue and expand our news product on a new broadcast channel" in early to mid-2015, retaining and re-locating the station's staff, news operation, and sales department to a new, unspecified outlet and studio. Local personality Pinky Kravitz (whose WOND radio show was aired on WMGM) disclosed that the station was seeking $3 million in funding for these planned changes. Access.1, at the time, still retained ownership of WMGM-LP, a low-power analog rebroadcaster of WMGM-TV.

WMGM-TV aired its final night of newscasts and NBC programming on December 31, 2014; its final program under Access.1 was an hour-long documentary focusing on the station's history and staff entitled NewsCenter 40: The Stories Behind the Station. Following the end of its affiliation, WMGM began to carry programming from Soul of the South—a network focusing primarily on the African-American community. The station was also reported to be in preliminary talks with the owners of WOND to produce local programming. WMGM-TV's new programming was reported to be an interim measure, assuming that LocusPoint did manage to sell the station during the 2016 spectrum incentive auction. On January 1, 2016, due to Soul of the South winding down their operations because of financial struggles, the station switched to programming from the religious Sonlife Broadcasting Network but within a few months WMGM dropped Sonlife and began broadcasting as an independent station.

Local programming returned August 1, 2016, under a brokered programming arrangement with Advantage Broadcasting, they sold time to SNJ Today to air a news program featuring former WMGM staff and talent. As an independent station, WMGM-TV mostly aired infomercials during the day. SNJ Today newscasts were also carried on WACP, a new Atlantic City television station that signed on in 2012.

=== Sale to Univision ===
On June 26, 2017, LocusPoint Networks agreed to sell WMGM-TV to Univision Communications, through its Univision Local Media subsidiary, for $6 million. The deal made WMGM-TV a sister station to WUVP-DT (channel 65) and WFPA-CD (channel 28). Univision took control of the station on November 14, 2017; that day, WMGM-TV became an affiliate of the Justice Network (now True Crime Network).

=== Sale of WMGM-LP to Engle Broadcasting ===
On March 3, 2018, Access.1 Communications, which formerly owned the main WMGM-TV station but retained WMGM-LP and the construction permit for WMGM-LD, sold the low-power station to Engle Broadcasting, LLC of Cedar Brook, New Jersey. On April 16, 2018, Engle Broadcasting filed an application with the Federal Communications Commission (FCC) requesting the consent for Silent STA on WMGM-LP which was granted until October 16, 2018.

The FCC canceled the license for WMGM-LP on January 7, 2021.

== Newscasts and local programming ==
At the end of its NBC affiliation, WMGM-TV broadcast 20 hours of locally produced newscasts each week. The station did not produce a midday newscast on weekdays or any morning or early evening newscasts on weekends. WMGM was the only remaining New Jersey-licensed commercial television station that maintained its own news department; MyNetworkTV station WWOR-TV upstate in Secaucus controversially shut down its news department (which was kept in operation long after its 2001 acquisition by Fox Television Stations, which created a duopoly with Fox owned-and-operated station WNYW in nearby New York City) in July 2013, its 10 p.m. newscast was replaced by the outsourced news program Chasing New Jersey that month.

The station produced an entertainment program called Curtain Call with David Spatz (which won a 2007 Emmy Award for outstanding interview/discussion series); the program featured interviews with world-class artists performing in Atlantic City. WMGM also produced two public affairs programs: WMGM Presents Pinky (Saturday nights at 7:30), and Forum 40 (Sunday mornings at 11:30). Prior to 2011, the station did not air local news programming on weekday mornings (instead running religious programming from 5 to 6 a.m. and a simulcast of the Don Williams radio talk show from WOND, from 6 to 7 a.m.). WMGM debuted its first weekday morning newscast on March 28, 2011, the hour-long Today in South Jersey.

Local newscasts returned to Southern New Jersey in the form of SNJ Today, which premiered in the summer of 2015. It currently airs every weeknight at 7 p.m. and 11 p.m. on WACP (channel 4). SNJ Today began to also air on WMGM beginning on August 1, airing at the same times as it does on WACP. WMGM and WACP simulcast the newscasts until the former announced its sale to Univision in 2017.

== Technical information ==
=== Subchannels ===
Subchannels of WMGM-TV and WGTW-TV
License	Subchannel	Res.	Short name	Programming
WMGM-TV	40.1	480i	CRIME	True Crime Network
WMGM-TV	40.2	480i	GREAT	Great (4:3)
WMGM-TV	40.3	720p	WUVP-HD	Univision (WUVP-DT)
WGTW-TV	48.1	720p	TBN-HD	TBN
WGTW-TV	48.2	480i	TVDEALS	Infomercials
WGTW-TV	48.3	480i	Inspire	TBN Inspire
WGTW-TV	48.4	480i	ONTV4U	OnTV4U (infomercials) (4:3)

Simulcast of subchannels of another station

=== Analog-to-digital conversion ===
WMGM-TV ended regular programming on its analog signal, over UHF channel 40, on June 12, 2009, the official date on which full-power television stations in the United States transitioned from analog to digital broadcasts under federal mandate. The station's digital signal remained on its pre-transition UHF channel 36, using virtual channel 40.

== Coverage area ==
WMGM-TV primarily serves Atlantic, Cape May and Cumberland counties. Its digital over-the-air signal also penetrates parts of southern Ocean County, southern Burlington County, eastern Camden and Gloucester counties and coastal Delaware.
