= Pinky Kravitz =

American radio broadcaster

Seymour "Pinky" Kravitz (July 11, 1927 – October 31, 2015) was an Atlantic City, New Jersey based American radio broadcaster and print journalist. He was known simply as "Pinky," and he reportedly refused to answer to his given name.

Kravitz was born in Martinsburg, West Virginia and moved to Atlantic City as a child, where he attended Atlantic City High School. He attended New York University on a basketball scholarship.

He hosted Pinky's Corner on WOND-AM from an array of Atlantic City locations from 1958 until a few months before his death, which followed heart surgery, in 2015. He also hosted WMGM-TV Presents Pinky! for years on WMGM-TV-40 in Atlantic City and penned columns for many periodicals including for The Press of Atlantic City.

Kravitz was a resident of Ventnor City, New Jersey.

In 2017, Kravitz was honored and memorialized with a plaque on the Atlantic City Boardwalk.
