= Juiced (video game) =

- Cover art featuring Mazda RX-8
- Developer: Juice Games
- Publisher: THQ
- Director: Tim Preece
- Designer: Richard Badger
- Programmer: Rob Anderson
- Artist: Andrew Bate
- Platforms: Windows; PlayStation 2 Xbox; Mobile phone
- Release: NA: 7 May 2005 (Mobile); NA: 13 June 2005; EU: 17 June 2005
- Genre: Racing
- Modes: Single-player, multiplayer

Juiced is a 2005 racing video game developed by British studio Juice Games for Microsoft Windows, PlayStation 2, Xbox, and mobile phones. Originally planned for release in 2004, the game was delayed to the following year, when the original publisher Acclaim Entertainment filed for bankruptcy. Juice Games and Fund 4 Games retained ownership of the property and sold the game to THQ, resulting in the new publisher funding six more months of the game's development.

The game features Career and Arcade modes that offer increasingly-difficult challenges, the ability to customise both the appearance and performance of cars (including nitrous boosts), as well as unlocking new cars.

Juiced sold more than 2.5 million units and topped the United Kingdom MCV sales charts. In early 2006, British software publisher Focus Multimedia re-released the PC version of Juiced at a new budget price as part of its "Essential" games line.

== Gameplay ==
The game is set in a fictional Californian city called Angel City, based on Los Angeles. Angel City is composed of eight districts, San Ricardo, Campbell Hills, Downtown, Angel North Central, Angel Westside, Southside Beach, East Angel Island and Anderson. The districts are controlled by rival crews in the game, and the player can host events at different districts if they get enough Respect.

=== Racing modes ===
There are four different racing types:

- Circuit (classic race to the finish line in a closed track with a certain number of laps)
- Point-to-point (classic race to the finish line in a track from point A to point B)
- Sprint (drag race, speed race in a straight line (or mostly) in which automatic transmission is disabled by the game so the player must change from gear to gear manually)
- Showoff (timed event in which the player must do stunts in order to score points; the game includes a bunch of tutorial videos for these events, offered right before entering the car selection menu for the Showoff event and also available in Main Menu > Extras)

There are not only races in which every racer is a rival, but also crew races comprising two racers from one crew (2 vs 2 vs 2, as well as 2 vs 2), as well as composed of three members of the same crew (3 vs 3). In these races, all of the racers of one same crew must cross the line before any other crew does to win the race.

In the Career mode, if the player achieves a minimum of 600 respect with a certain rival crew, they can participate in Pink Slip races (Sprint, Point-to-point or Circuit races in which both racers bet their cars). The Custom Race mode features a Solo mode as well so the player can race any circuit with no racers, no time limit and no laps count.

Juiced supports online multiplayer. The Xbox version was playable online until the termination of Xbox Live for original Xbox games in 2010. Juiced is now playable online again on the revival online servers called Insignia.

== Development ==
Juiced was originally intended to be published by Acclaim Entertainment, and released for the PlayStation 2, Xbox and PC in late 2004. However, the game was caught up in Acclaim's Chapter 7 bankruptcy issues and never released by them. Game magazines around the world wrote reviews on nearly finished copies of the game. It was then picked up by THQ as the new publisher and later released in 2005.

== Promotion ==
Lawton eMarketing and Maverick Media created an advertisement for Juiced in the United Kingdom in which two male gamers customising an in-game vehicle discover they also have control over a female bystander (Alex Sim-Wise), prompting them to manipulate her body and remove her clothing.

The advertisement generated controversy due to its depiction of a woman being forcefully stripped, leading to it being pulled. Despite the controversy, it was voted the best viral ad created by a UK digital creative agency in Channel 4's Ideas Factory viral competition.

== Reception ==
Reception

Aggregate scores
Aggregator	Score			
Aggregator	mobile	PC	PS2	Xbox
GameRankings	77%	67%	68%	71%
Metacritic	N/A	63/100	68/100	68/100

Review scores
Publication	Score			
Publication	mobile	PC	PS2	Xbox
Edge	N/A	6/10; 5/10 (Beta)	6/10; 5/10 (Beta)	6/10; 5/10 (Beta)
Electronic Gaming Monthly	N/A	N/A	6.83/10	6.83/10
Eurogamer	N/A	N/A	N/A	6/10
Famitsu	N/A	N/A	29/40	N/A
Game Informer	N/A	N/A	7.5/10; 5.75/10 (Beta)	7.5/10; 5.75/10 (Beta)
GamePro	N/A	N/A	3/5	3/5
GameSpot	N/A	6.1/10	6.3/10	6.3/10
GameSpy	N/A	3/5	3.5/5	3.5/5
GameZone	N/A	N/A	6.5/10	7.4/10
IGN	N/A	6/10	6.5/10	6.8/10
Official U.S. PlayStation Magazine	N/A	N/A	3.5/5	N/A
Official Xbox Magazine (US)	N/A	N/A	N/A	8.1/10
PC Gamer (US)	N/A	68%	N/A	N/A
Detroit Free Press	N/A	N/A	2/4	N/A
The Times	N/A	4/5	4/5	4/5

Juiced received "mixed or average reviews" on all platforms according to video game review aggregator website Metacritic.

Right before the bankruptcy issues by Acclaim, Lisa Mason of Game Informer gave the beta version of the game a score of 5.75 out of 10 in its October 2004 issue, stating that it "falls to the lower end of the goodness scale. [...] Depending on what I am doing, I yearn for any of the more-polished (and more playable) racing titles that it tries to emulate. Juiced's particular mix of sim and arcade racing is best summed up as a failed experiment." After the THQ acquisition and redevelopment of the game, however, Mason raised the rating to 7 out of 10 in her Second Opinion in the magazine's July 2005 issue, calling it "an exponentially better game than it was when I reviewed it many months ago. Does that mean that it's a super awesome, edge of your seat thrill ride? Not so much, but it does have its charms and is a nicely varied street racer." Matthew Kato of the same publisher agreed, giving the game a better score of 7.5 out of 10 and saying that it "certainly has the makings of an average street racer, with lots of customisables and affected street appeal."

The Times gave the game four stars out of five and stated, "The gameplay is varied enough to maintain interest, and its clutch of quirky distractions adds to the experience. After all its development setbacks, it's definitely worth a spin." The Sydney Morning Herald gave the PS2 version four-and-a-half stars out of five and said that it was "instantly approachable". Conversely, Playboy gave the same version 70%; likewise, Detroit Free Press gave the similar version two stars out of four, criticising the costly upgrades, but praising the musical selection that "features a nice mix of techno, rock and hip-hop." In Japan, Famitsu gave the same console version a score of one eight and three sevens for a total of 29 out of 40.

== Sequels ==
In 2006, Juiced: Eliminator was released for the PlayStation Portable and mobile phones. Juiced 2: Hot Import Nights was released in 2007.
