= Juiced: Eliminator =

2006 video game

- Developer: Juice Games (Note: The mobile port was developed by Universomo.)
- Publisher: THQ (Note: The mobile port was published under the THQ Wireless label.)
- Series: Juiced
- Platforms: PlayStation Portable, Mobile
- Release: PlayStation Portable: NA: 28 June 2006; AU: 27 July 2006; EU: 28 July 2006; Mobile: EU: 28 June 2006
- Genre: Racing
- Modes: Single-player, Multiplayer

Juiced: Eliminator is a 2006 racing video game developed by British studio Juice Games and published by THQ. It was released in June 2006 for the PlayStation Portable (PSP) and later that year for mobile phones under the title Juiced 3D.

The game serves as a sequel to the 2005 title Juiced and features a rebooted narrative. Players begin a new racing career set in the fictional Angel City. Juiced: Eliminator introduces new gameplay modes, including an "Eliminator" mode in which the last-place driver is eliminated after each lap.

== Plot ==
The game focuses on the player's racing career in the fictional city of Angel City. At the start, the player competes against a new crew leader named Nina, who initially shows little respect for newcomers. She offers the player the use of one of her cars and proposes a wager, similar to the mechanic used by TK in the original Juiced. Upon defeating Nina in the race, additional gameplay options are unlocked, and she becomes an ally. Following the tutorial, the player gains access to a broader selection of race events, enabling them to acquire new cars and earn recognition from Nina and other crew leaders.

== Gameplay ==
The game features six types of races: Circuit, Point-to-Point, Sprint, Showoff, Eliminator, and Relay Race:

- Circuit – A standard race format where players must complete a predetermined number of laps on a closed circuit.
- Point-to-Point – A linear race from a starting point to a finish line, without laps.
- Sprint – A drag-style race available only with manual transmission. Players compete in a three-heat series against three opponents, earning points in each heat; the overall winner is determined by the total score.
- Showoff – A timed event where players perform various stunts, such as donut spins, bootleg turns, 360s, J-turns, and drifting, to earn points.
- Eliminator – A multi-lap race where the last-place driver is eliminated at the end of each lap. The event continues until only one driver remains.
- Relay Race – A race mode involving car switching at set intervals, typically in team formats such as 2-2-2 or 3-3.

Juiced: Eliminator also includes a Career Challenge mode, an additional career mode in which players must complete a series of races assigned by crew leaders. These challenges are time-limited, requiring completion within a set number of in-game days or months.

== Reception ==
Reception

Aggregate score
| Aggregator | Score |
|---|---|
| Metacritic | 65/100 |

Review scores
| Publication | Score |
|---|---|
| Eurogamer | 6/10 |
| Game Informer | 7.75/10 |
| GameSpot | 6/10 |
| GameSpy | 3/5 |
| GameTrailers | 6.2/10 |
| GameZone | 6.5/10 |
| IGN | 7/10 |
| Official U.S. PlayStation Magazine | 2.5/5 |
| PALGN | 5.5/10 |
| VideoGamer.com | 5/10 |
| The Sydney Morning Herald | 3/5 |
| The Times | 3/5 |

The game received “mixed” reviews according to the video game review aggregator website Metacritic.
