= WDVB-CD =

Television station in Edison, New Jersey

- Edison, New Jersey; New York, New York; United States
- City: Edison, New Jersey
- Channels: Digital: 22 (UHF), shared with WTBY-TV; Virtual: 23

Programming
- Affiliations: 23.1: TBN Inspire; 23.2: TBN

Ownership
- Owner: Trinity Broadcasting Network; (Trinity Broadcasting of Texas, Inc.)
- Sister stations: WTBY-TV

History
- First air date: March 1991
- Former call signs: W36AS (1991–2005); W39CQ (2005); WDVB-CA (2005–2013)
- Former channel numbers: Analog: 39 (UHF, 1991–2013); Digital: 23 (UHF, 2010–2019)
- Former affiliations: Asian Independent (1991–2004); ImaginAsian (2004–2010); The Country Network (2010–2018); Hillsong Channel (2018–2021)
- Call sign meaning: Deepak Viswanath Broadcasting (previous owner)

Technical information
- Licensing authority: FCC
- Facility ID: 168834
- Class: CD
- ERP: 15 kW
- HAAT: 300.3 m (985 ft)
- Transmitter coordinates: 40°44′54″N 73°59′9″W

Links
- Public license information: Public file; LMS

WDVB-CD (channel 23) is a low-power, Class A television station licensed to Edison, New Jersey, United States, serving the New York City television market with programming from TBN Inspire. It is owned by the Trinity Broadcasting Network alongside Jersey City, New Jersey–licensed WTBY-TV (channel 54). The two stations share studios on East 15th Street in the Union Square neighborhood in Manhattan and transmitter facilities at the Empire State Building.

== Development ==
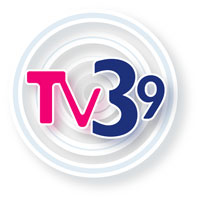
Logo for WDVB-CA while on channel 39

This station signed on over UHF channel 36 with the alphanumeric call sign W36AS in March 1991. The station aired Asian independent programming. In 2004, it became an affiliate of ImaginAsian and dropped the independent format. On January 4, 2005, the station vacated channel 36 to avoid causing interference to full-power WNJU Linden, which was assigned channel 36 for its DTV operations. The station moved to channel 39, and was assigned alphanumeric call sign W39CQ. The station requested and was granted Class A status. On February 16, 2005, the call sign was changed to WDVB-CA. In early 2010, ImaginAsian was dropped. With no programming immediately available to replace it, WDVB-CA was only airing a color bars test pattern.

In March 2013, WDVB's class A status was transferred from an analog station to a digital station (which became WDVB-CD), and the analog license was turned in; the analog signal had left the air for technical reasons on February 9. Shortly afterward, Edison Broadcasting filed to sell the station to LocusPoint Networks. The sale closed on August 19, 2013. In 2017, TBN O&O WTBY-TV began channel sharing with WDVB-CD. In 2018, LocusPoint Networks sold WDVB-CD to TBN, creating a duopoly with WTBY-TV.

== Subchannels ==
Subchannels of WDVB-CD and WTBY-TV
License	Subchannel	Res.	Short name	Programming
WDVB-CD	23.1	480i	Inspire	TBN Inspire
WDVB-CD	23.2	720p	TBN	TBN
WTBY-TV	54.1	720p	TBN	TBN
WTBY-TV	54.2	720p	TVDEALS	Infomercials
WTBY-TV	54.3	480i	ONTV4U	OnTV4U (infomercials) (4:3)
WTBY-TV	54.4	480i	POSITIV	Positiv
