= WMJF-CD =

Television station in Towson, Maryland

- Towson–Baltimore, Maryland; United States
- City: Towson, Maryland
- Channels: Digital: 23 (UHF); Virtual: 39

Programming
- Affiliations: see § Subchannels

Ownership
- Owner: HME Equity Fund II, LLC

History
- Founded: May 31, 1989
- First air date: January 30, 1995
- Former call signs: W61BT (1995–1996); WMJF-LP (1996–2014)
- Former channel numbers: Analog: 61 (UHF, 1995–2001), 16 (UHF, 2001–2014); Digital: 39 (UHF, 2014–2020)
- Former affiliations: The WB (1995–1998); N1 (secondary, 1995–1997); America One (1998–2004); Independent (2004–2018); MTV2 (secondary, 2004–2011); CAS (secondary, 2011–2018); Grit (2018–2020 and January–June 2021); MeTV (2020–January 2021); Ion Television (June 2021–2023); Mariavision (2023–2024)
- Call sign meaning: Michigan J. Frog (from its days as a WB affiliate)

Technical information
- Licensing authority: FCC
- Facility ID: 191262
- Class: LD
- ERP: 15 kW
- HAAT: 107.3 m (352 ft)
- Transmitter coordinates: 39°24′10.4″N 76°36′10.9″W

Links
- Public license information: Public file; LMS

WMJF-CD (channel 39) is a low-power, Class A television station licensed to Towson, Maryland, United States, serving the Baltimore area. The station is owned by HME Equity Fund II, LLC, and has a transmitter on Maryland Route 45 near the Towson Town Center mall.

== History ==
WMJF's former studio in the Media Center at the campus of Towson University.

Towson University (then Towson State University) applied for a construction permit on channel 61 in 1988 as a student television station. After eight extensions of the permit into 1994, Towson applied to reduce the station's effective radiated power by a factor of ten to just 521 watts. Station W61BT then applied for its license January 30, 1995.

W61BT was the Baltimore market's charter affiliate for The WB, which launched the same month. At the time "Towson State Television" was largely invisible to local viewers, as its coverage radius was about three miles (5 km) from the university and it did not have must-carry rights on cable as a low-power station. Station management took the chance on joining The WB after no full-power station in the city was willing to join the network, and expressed optimism that the network affiliation for the new station would lead to cable carriage and provide a unique learning opportunity for students. By the fall, when the network was also available from WBDC (channel 50, now CW owned-and-operated station WDCW) in Washington, D.C., this had not materialized and Baltimore Sun sports media critic Milton Kent called on local cable providers to carry that station instead. The station changed its callsign to WMJF-LP in February 1996, reflecting its network's mascot, Michigan J. Frog. The WB signed a deal to move to UPN affiliate WNUV (channel 54) in July 1997, effective the following January, and a network spokesman referred to Baltimore as one of the network's "five biggest holes" in coverage.

After a brief stint as an America One affiliate, WMJF became an independent station and also carried MTV2 in 2004. WMJF was also a CNN student bureau, one of only two in the country.

WMJF was a 90 percent student run organization, operated under faculty advisers Dr. John MacKerron and Dr. David Reiss, and an executive board of five elected and appointed positions that they deemed necessary to help operate the station.

Towson University sold WMJF-LP to LocusPoint Networks in December 2012. The deal closed on August 8, 2013. LocusPoint then sold WMJF-CD to HME Equity Fund II on April 8, 2018. Towson University continued to operate the station until 2019. Programming and operations are handled remotely via satellite feed. From 2021 to 2023, WMJF-CD was an affiliate of Ion Television, which moved to WMAR-DT5.

On June 28, 2024, the signal was shut down to upgrade the signal in preparations for the addition of MeTV Toons.

== WMJFNow ==
WMJFNow was launched in August 2006, after a beta run the previous spring. The program was run using Google Video. WMJFNow was created by webmaster and station president Christopher Taydus with help from many station members including Josh Eisenberg, Joe Achard and Diego Torres. It was created to help find a new audience for the station. Taydus was quoted as saying, "I have a friend who goes to Northeastern who has been watching our sitcom Film School. We've even had guys from other countries watching." When asked about the numbers that some shows were receiving, Eisenberg said, "In the college television market those are incredible numbers to be receiving. It used to be just a five-mile radius, and now anyone can see it."

== Technical information ==
=== Subchannels ===
The station's signal is multiplexed:

Subchannels of WMJF-CD
Subchannel	Res.	Short name	Programming
39.1	1080i	WMJF-CD	MeTV Toons
39.2	480i	MovieS	MovieSphere Gold
39.3	480i	JTV	Jewelry TV
39.4	480i	Laff	Laff
39.5	480i	IONPlus	Ion Plus
39.6	480i	Heroes	Heroes & Icons
39.7	480i	MarioVi	Mariavision (4:3)

=== Spectrum reallocation ===
As a part of the repacking process following the 2016–2017 FCC incentive auction, WMJF-CD relocated to UHF channel 23 in summer 2020, using virtual channel 39.
