= WTBY-TV =

Television station in Jersey City, New Jersey

- Jersey City, New Jersey; New York, New York; United States
- City: Jersey City, New Jersey (Note: Originally licensed to Poughkeepsie, New York; moved to Jersey City in 2017.)
- Channels: Digital: 22 (UHF), shared with WDVB-CD; Virtual: 54

Programming
- Affiliations: 54.1: TBN; for others, see § Subchannels

Ownership
- Owner: Trinity Broadcasting Network; (Trinity Broadcasting of New York, Inc.)
- Sister stations: WDVB-CD

History
- First air date: April 6, 1981
- Former call signs: WFTI-TV (1981–1983)
- Former channel numbers: Analog: 54 (UHF, 1981–2008); Digital: 27 (UHF, 2003–2017), 23 (UHF, 2017–2019)
- Former affiliations: Independent (1981–1983)
- Call sign meaning: Trinity Broadcasting New York

Technical information
- Licensing authority: FCC
- Facility ID: 67993
- ERP: 15 kW
- HAAT: 300.3 m (985 ft)
- Transmitter coordinates: 40°44′54″N 73°59′9″W

Links
- Public license information: Public file; LMS
- Website: WTBY's public file on TBN's website

WTBY-TV (channel 54) is a religious television station licensed to Jersey City, New Jersey, United States, serving the New York City area. The station is owned by the Trinity Broadcasting Network (TBN) alongside Class A TBN Inspire outlet WDVB-CD (channel 23). The two stations share studios on East 15th Street in the Union Square neighborhood in Manhattan and transmitter facilities at the Empire State Building. Due to WTBY having to share spectrum with WDVB-CD, the signal can only be received in the immediate New York City area and its surrounding areas. As a result, it relays on cable and streaming to reach the whole market.

== History ==
WTBY signed on April 6, 1981, as WFTI-TV, originally licensed to the city of Poughkeepsie, New York, in the Hudson Valley region. The station was initially owned by Family Television, Inc., founded by Keith Houser in 1979, and headquartered in the Poughkeepsie Plaza Mall on US 9 in Poughkeepsie. WFTI's early programming included reruns of The Lone Ranger and The Cisco Kid, and the station originated coverage of Army Cadets sports (except the Army–Navy college football game); Family TV also produced Valley Magazine, a nightly 30-minute program with interviews of local celebrities, such as James Cagney.

After Irving Trust, the station's sole banking source, experienced financial problems and prematurely called the station's loan in 1982 (Irving Trust was ultimately shut down by the Federal Reserve), Family Television sold the station to the Trinity Broadcasting Network in June 1982, though the sale would not be completed until over a year later, in July 1983. TBN then changed the station's call letters on October 4, 1983, to the present WTBY-TV and moved the station's operations to studios in the village of Fishkill. Not long after taking control of the station, TBN co-founders Paul and Jan Crouch helped sign WTBY on the air under TBN ownership with a special edition of the network's flagship program Praise the Lord, broadcast from the new Fishkill studios.

While Poughkeepsie is part of the New York City television market, WTBY's over-the-air signal could only be seen clearly in the northern fringes of the area. Most of the core of the New York area, including the Five Boroughs, got only a rimshot signal even in digital, and it completely missed most of Long Island. For most of its first quarter-century as a TBN-owned station, the bulk of its viewership was in the Albany–Schenectady–Troy market. Until 2010, WTBY operated two translators in that market—W52DF channel 52 to reach Albany and the Capital District, and W47CM on channel 47 to reach Glens Falls and the Adirondacks. Both stations ceased broadcasting due to declining support, which has been attributed to the digital transition, with W52DF shutting down on March 13 and W47CM shutting down one month later. W52DF's license, along with 43 other silent TBN repeaters, was canceled on December 1, 2011, for remaining silent over a year.

Until 2007, WTBY was not carried on the two main cable systems in New York City itself (Optimum and Spectrum [formerly Time Warner Cable]), and its cable penetration is still spotty at best on the New Jersey and Connecticut sides of the market. It is not available on DirecTV or Dish Network's New York City local feeds; only the national version is available, as is the case with all TBN-owned stations.

Despite its modest cable penetration in the area, TBN has poured significant resources into WTBY in recent years. In 2007, when TBN opened a new studio in the former Century Center for the Performing Arts near Union Square in Manhattan, WTBY's studio/office operations were moved to that location.

WTBY-TV elected to keep RF channel 27 permanently for digital operation during the first round of digital channel elections in February 2005. The station discontinued regular programming on its analog signal, over UHF channel 54, on October 1, 2008. The station's digital signal remained on its pre-transition UHF channel 27, using virtual channel 54.

The shutdown initially caused the station to be dropped from Service Electric's systems in New Jersey due to difficulty in receiving the signal at the cable headend. Service Electric replaced it with the national TBN service.

Trinity Broadcasting entered WTBY-TV's broadcast frequency into the FCC's spectrum auction, the results of which were released in April 2017. TBN received $162,402,181 for WTBY-TV's spectrum and as a result, the station relinquished its RF channel 27 frequency and moved to channel 23, where it entered into a channel-sharing arrangement with Class A station WDVB-CD, licensed to Edison, New Jersey. WDVB-CD's transmitter is located atop the Empire State Building, and moving WTBY's transmitter there gave it a clear over-the-air signal to New York City for the first time ever. TBN additionally requested to have WTBY's community of license moved from Poughkeepsie to Jersey City, New Jersey, as WDVB's transmitter location at the Empire State Building would leave WTBY unable to service Poughkeepsie with a viewable over-the-air signal. The FCC approved the license move from Poughkeepsie to Jersey City on September 21, 2017. In late January 2018, TBN began the process of purchasing WDVB-CD from their owners, allowing full control of the entire channel space.

== Local programming ==
Locally produced programs included versions of Praise the Lord and Joy in Our Town, a public affairs program. WTBY also carried programs produced by local pastors, notably A. R. Bernard of Christian Cultural Center, and Floyd H. Flake of the Greater Allen A. M. E. Cathedral of New York. As of 2017, this programming was canceled.

== Subchannels ==
Subchannels of WDVB-CD and WTBY-TV
License	Subchannel	Res.	Short name	Programming
WDVB-CD	23.1	480i	Inspire	TBN Inspire
WDVB-CD	23.2	720p	TBN	TBN
WTBY-TV	54.1	720p	TBN	TBN
WTBY-TV	54.2	720p	TVDEALS	Infomercials
WTBY-TV	54.3	480i	ONTV4U	OnTV4U (infomercials) (4:3)
WTBY-TV	54.4	480i	POSITIV	Positiv
