= Alex Sim-Wise =

English model, writer and TV presenter

- Born: 11 November 1981 (age 44); Hatfield, Hertfordshire, England
- Occupations: Model; writer; TV presenter
- Height: 5 ft 5 in (1.65 m)

Alexandra "Alex" Emily Sim-Wise (born 11 November 1981) is an English model, writer and TV presenter.

== Modeling career ==
Raised in Coventry, Sim-Wise started modeling after winning an FHM student competition while she was studying at university, where she was Captain of her University Cheerleading squad. She graduated in 2004 with a degree in Film and American Studies.

A natural redhead, she worked for The Fratellis as the real-life version of the redhead pin-up on the cover of their debut album, appearing in TV adverts, in-store appearances, and with the band at Reading festival. She also appeared in a commercial for the 2006 racing video game Juiced, which was voted the best viral ad created by a UK digital creative agency in Channel 4's Ideas Factory viral competition.

During her modeling career, she shot for Agent Provocateur, Rankin and Perou.

== Front magazine ==
She started working for the men's lifestyle magazine Front at the beginning of 2007, writing her own column entitled "Wise Words: the Secret Life of a Model" which also features a look into her day-to-day life via random personal snapshots.

In 2009, she started writing for Front's video games section and was the magazine’s Games Editor.

Sim-Wise left Front in May 2012; her final article was in issue 169.

== Television work ==
She was a correspondent for G4's Attack of the Show! and X-Play. G4TV is an American cable and satellite television channel that focuses on video games and gadgets. In addition to her correspondent duties, she has also co-hosted Attack of the Show!; worked as a field reporter for G4 during its live E3 2010 coverage; and presented the segment “The Feed” on Attack of the Show!

Across Europe, she works as a host for MTV Live HD, covering the European festival season and interviewing popular musical acts such as Muse, Dizzee Rascal, The Dead Weather, Thirty Seconds to Mars, Die Antwoord and Nas.

She made her television debut on her own show for Sumo TV called In Bed with Sim-Wise, after being discovered by James Brown in 2008. She co-wrote and presented the late night show, which featured various user-generated clips and sketches she had made at home with her co-host Prolapse, whose identity remains a mystery. She cited late night early nineties shows such as The Word and The Adam and Joe Show as influences.

An active blogger, her popularity on the social networking site MySpace led to her working for MySpace UK during 2008 as its celebrity interviewer, for whom she interviewed Lady Gaga and Jack Black, among others.

Throughout 2009, she worked for Current TV as one of its regular TV presenters, and has also appeared on other television channels including Fiver and BBC Three.

In 2021, she was filmed for Channel 4 documentary How to Make It on OnlyFans. The documentary, broadcast on 9 December 2021, saw her help three newcomers to the OnlyFans platform improve their performance and incomes.

== Radio work ==
She was briefly the resident games and gadgets girl on the Greg James Radio 1 weekday afternoon show. She also did games reviews for Kerrang! 105.2.
