= WUVP-DT =

Television station in Vineland, New Jersey

- Vineland, New Jersey; Philadelphia, Pennsylvania; United States
- City: Vineland, New Jersey
- Channels: Digital: 17 (UHF), shared with WPHL-TV; Virtual: 65
- Branding: Univision 65; Noticias N+ Univision 65 (newscasts)

Programming
- Affiliations: 65.1: Univision; 65.2: Bounce TV; 65.3: True Crime Network

Ownership
- Owner: TelevisaUnivision; (Univision Philadelphia LLC)
- Sister stations: WFPA-CD, WMGM-TV

History
- First air date: July 13, 1981
- Former call signs: WRBV (1981–1985); WSJT (1985–1986); WHSP (1986–1992); WHSP-TV (1992–2002)
- Former channel numbers: Analog: 65 (UHF, 1981–2009); Digital: 29 (UHF, 2002–2018)
- Former affiliations: Wometco Home Theater (1981–1984); FNN (1982–1985); Odyssey (1984–1985); Independent (1985–1986); HSN (1986–2002)
- Call sign meaning: "Univision Philadelphia"

Technical information
- Licensing authority: FCC
- Facility ID: 60560
- ERP: 645 kW
- HAAT: 324 m (1,063 ft)
- Transmitter coordinates: 40°2′30.9″N 75°14′21.9″W
- Translator(s): WMGM-TV 40.3 (36.5 UHF) Wildwood, NJ

Links
- Public license information: Public file; LMS
- Website: www.univision.com/local/philadelphia-wuvp

WUVP-DT (channel 65) is a television station licensed to Vineland, New Jersey, United States, broadcasting the Spanish-language Univision network to the Philadelphia area. It is owned and operated by TelevisaUnivision alongside Wildwood, New Jersey–licensed True Crime Network affiliate WMGM-TV (channel 40) and low-power, Class A UniMás station WFPA-CD (channel 28). The stations share studios on North Delsea Drive in Newfield, New Jersey, north of Vineland, with additional offices in Center City, Philadelphia. Through a channel sharing agreement with CW station WPHL-TV (channel 17), WUVP-DT transmits using WPHL-TV's spectrum from a tower in the Roxborough section of Philadelphia.

Channel 65 was originally established as WRBV, one of the first Black-owned stations in the United States, in 1981. A protracted and expensive construction process with multiple legal battles prompted it to be placed in receivership just five months after going on air. It continued as an independent under receivership and another owner until 1986, when it was sold to the Home Shopping Network. Univision acquired the station in 2002 as part of its purchase of USA Broadcasting.

== History ==
=== WRBV ===
On June 14, 1978, the Renaissance Broadcasting Corporation of Willingboro, headed by former New Jersey Public Television employee Donald McMeans, applied for a construction permit for channel 65 in Vineland. A construction permit for WRBV was granted on February 1, 1979, making Renaissance just the second Black-owned group to receive a TV station permit; the only other such station was Detroit's WGPR-TV.

From the outset, there were doubters. One was a Vineland city councilor, Si Solazzo, who called the company "a little shaky" after McMeans opted not to partner with the city to land a $1.6 million grant to finance the station. However, the grant deal got over the hump. With financing lined up, McMeans then attempted to secure a network affiliation. However, ABC showed no interest in bringing an affiliation to South Jersey, and McMeans instead signed a deal to broadcast the subscription television (STV) service of Wometco Home Theater (WHT). After the FCC agreed to waive its rule only permitting one STV station in each market in exchange for a promise of local programming in the 7 p.m. hour, ground was broken on the Vineland facilities in March 1980.

The construction did not go smoothly, either. In one day in September, a court order halted construction on the tower in Waterford Township, New Jersey—25 miles (40 km) southeast of Philadelphia—because the township claimed Renaissance had not filed for the appropriate building permits and raised environmental objections to the site in the Pine Barrens, and the company discovered an error in the contract relating to the federal grant that threatened to leave construction incomplete. The New Jersey Pinelands Commission threatened to revoke its permit to build the tower.

By late October, with all of the permitting issues for the tower solved, construction was moving, and McMeans eyed a January air date. Even then, there were still hurdles. Vandalism was noted at the construction site. One morning, workers arrived to find a note pinned in a tree warning, "Hey, nigger, this tower is not up yet" and a bullet hole in a piece of equipment; a firebomb was also set off. WRBV finally began broadcasting on July 13, 1981. Outside of WHT hours, it offered reruns and local news, with four mobile units purchased to cover South Jersey and the state government in Trenton.

People would have been overwhelmingly happy to see this station in South Jersey if we were white. But what can I do? I can't jump in a can of paint.

— Donald McMeans, on the impact of racism on the early struggles of WRBV

However, even before launching, the legal fees and added costs associated with the prolonged construction had prompted McMeans to reduce the number of jobs at channel 65. Even after the station finally got on air, the financial picture did not clear up for Renaissance Broadcasting. The company missed loan payments to its primary lender, Girard Bank, and to the city of Vineland, with McMeans citing cash flow problems. The TelePrompTer Corporation cable systems resisted carrying the station—even in Vineland itself, where it had to by law—because it feared competition from WHT, opting to wait for an expansion of channel capacity to add WRBV. McMeans then sued all 20 cable systems in the channel 65 coverage area.

Time quickly ran out for McMeans. By late November, the station was broke and its telephone lines disconnected for lack of payment, and the company was desperately trying to line up new investors. The Farmers Home Administration lost patience and floated the idea of having a receiver appointed, which occurred at the request of Girard Bank on December 4, when a New Jersey Superior Court judge named Richard Milstead to manage WRBV's affairs.

Milstead moved immediately to trim expenses at the station that was $7.5 million in debt. The news department, advertising sales team, and two-thirds of the station's staff were terminated, leaving just 19 employees, 12 of them engineers. Milstead also began negotiating with Wometco, with some interest in freeing the station from the WHT contract to make it more attractive to potential buyers. However, new challenges emerged. Among the creditors was the New Jersey Department of Environmental Protection, which had granted the permit to build the Pine Barrens tower site and now threatened to revoke it for failure to pay rent. Losing the tower lease would have greatly devalued the bankruptcy estate; as an office building, the Vineland studio was only worth $100,000. However, the Superior Court judge blocked the state from revoking the tower site authorization because of the effect it would have had on WRBV as a going concern.

Receiver Milstead claimed he had two offers for the station in November, though the WHT contract continued to be a hurdle for potential buyers. The receivership instead dragged on for years, in part because Renaissance wanted to emerge from bankruptcy and operate the station itself. In November 1984, a buyer finally emerged: the Asbury Park Press, which through its Press Broadcasting Company offered $3 million for WRBV. The same day Milstead divulged the Press bid, Wometco Home Theater announced it would end service in the Philadelphia area at the end of November, with just 4,400 subscribers on channel 65, down from a peak of 20,000; this left a station whose primary daytime offering was the Financial News Network in search of more programming to fill WHT's air time. Music videos and college sports, including the 1985 Big East Conference basketball tournament, filled the void.

=== WSJT ===
On April 30, the FCC approved the transfer of WRBV to the Press. On June 12, the call letters were changed to WSJT ("South Jersey Television"). A new schedule followed on June 21, with original programs, classic syndicated reruns, and CNN Headline News; local news was ruled out because of the expense it had meant to WRBV. The Press then bought another independent TV station, WMOD in Melbourne, Florida; both stations were part of a plan to diversify the company from newspaper revenue.

While Press Broadcasting sought to reintroduce channel 65 to viewers, it also inherited some of WRBV's legal woes. An appellate court ruled in favor of Waterford Township in the five-year-old tower site case in 1985, saying that it had acted properly in denying a variance for the tower, and the New Jersey Supreme Court upheld its agreement, while Waterford Township reaffirmed its initial decision.

=== Home shopping and Univision ===
14 months after relaunching channel 65, in August 1986, Press Broadcasting announced it would sell the station to the Home Shopping Network (HSN) for $23 million, more than seven times the $3 million that Press had paid. HSN programming began to air on channel 65 on December 30, 1986, with new WHSP call letters also taking effect that same day.

In 1995, Barry Diller acquired Silver King Broadcasting, HSN's stations division (later renamed USA Broadcasting), with plans to eventually roll out a new format, "CityVision", on the stations in the portfolio. However, after the format failed to take off where it was introduced and the company registered operating losses of $62 million in 2000, Diller opted to sell the stations to Univision in 2001.

While some of the stations were used to start Telefutura, a second network, WHSP was one of several stations in markets where Univision did not previously own a full-power station. The network already had more than 20 years of history in Philadelphia, having operated a translator on channel 35 of its New York-area station, WXTV, since May 1980. On January 14, 2002, WHSP became Univision station WUVP.

== News operation ==
When Univision launched WUVP, it stated that a full local news service was not in its "immediate plans". These plans came to fruition on March 10, 2008, with the launch of 6 and 11 p.m. newscasts on weeknights; new staff were added and upgrades were made to the Vineland and Center City facilities to begin news production.

In December 2013, the station announced a news share agreement with WPVI-TV (channel 6); as a result, WUVP began airing a live newscast at 11 p.m.

== Technical information ==
=== Subchannels ===
WPHL-TV and WUVP are broadcast from a tower in Roxborough.

Subchannels of WPHL-TV and WUVP-DT
License	Subchannel	Res.	Short name	Programming
WPHL-TV	17.1	720p	WPHL-DT	The CW
WPHL-TV	17.2	480i	Antenna	Antenna TV (primary); MyNetworkTV (secondary)
WPHL-TV	17.3	480i	GRIT	Grit
WPHL-TV	17.4	480i	Comet	Comet
WUVP-DT	65.1	720p	WUVP-DT	Univision
WUVP-DT	65.2	480i	Bounce	Bounce TV
WUVP-DT	65.3	480i	Crime	True Crime Network (WMGM-TV)

Simulcast of subchannels of another station

=== Analog-to-digital conversion ===
WUVP-TV shut down its analog signal, over UHF channel 65, on June 12, 2009, the official date on which full-power television stations in the United States transitioned from analog to digital broadcasts under federal mandate. The station's digital signal continued to broadcast on its pre-transition UHF channel 29.

In the incentive auction, WUVP sold its spectrum for $86 million; it then entered into the present channel-sharing agreement with WPHL-TV.
