= True Crime Network =

American digital multicast television network

- Type: Digital multicast television network
- Country: United States
- Broadcast area: Nationwide via OTA digital TV (U.S. coverage: 57%)
- Affiliates: List of affiliates
- Headquarters: Atlanta, Georgia

Programming
- Picture format: 480i (SDTV) 16:9 widescreen or 4:3 letterbox

Ownership
- Owner: Tegna Inc., a subsidiary of Nexstar Media Group
- Parent: True Crime Network, LLC
- Key people: Brian Weiss; (President/General Manager); John Ford; (head of programming)
- Sister channels: Antenna TV; NewsNation; Rewind TV; The CW; Quest

History
- Founded: November 10, 2014; 11 years ago
- Launched: January 20, 2015; 11 years ago
- Founder: Lonnie Cooper
- Former names: Justice Network (2015–2020)

Links
- Website: truecrimenetworktv.com

True Crime Network (formerly Justice Network) is an American digital multicast television network that is operated by True Crime Network, LLC, a limited liability company, which is owned by the Tegna subsidiary of Nexstar Media Group. The network specializes in true crime, investigation and forensic science documentary programming aimed at adults—with a skew toward women—between the ages of 25 and 54.

The network, which broadcasts in 480i standard definition, is available in several large and mid-sized markets via digital subchannel affiliations with broadcast television stations, along with carriage of True Crime Network-affiliated subchannels on cable television providers in most of its market coverage via existing carriage agreements for local broadcast stations.

On July 13, 2020, it was announced that Justice Network would relaunch as True Crime Network on July 27.

== History ==
The concept for the network was developed in 2013, when network founder Lonnie Cooper (a former executive at Bounce TV and chief executive officer of sports marketing firm CSE) had approached Steve Schiffman (who formerly served as president of National Geographic Channel) on a proposal for a new digital multicast network. Schiffman consulted with John Ford, former president of Discovery Channel and co-founder of Investigation Discovery, and they suggested to Cooper that the network should focus on crime- and investigation-related programming, an idea they suggested based on the popularity of the genre and the success of Investigation Discovery. Incidentally by that year, about half of the 50 highest-rated television programs as ranked by Nielsen were crime-related series.

The formation of Justice Network was announced on November 10, 2014, with the Gannett Company's television station group tapped as its charter affiliates, which then reached one third of the population. Besides featuring justice-oriented programming intended to entertain audiences, the network was also intent on taking an active role in combating crime by working with various law enforcement agencies to disseminate information about missing children and about fugitives accused of various felonies. Cooper assembled several top media executives to head the network at its launch with Schiffman as chief executive officer, Barry Wallach (former president of NBCUniversal Television Distribution) as head of distribution and John Ford (former president of Discovery Channel) as head of programming.

The network launched at 6:00 p.m. Eastern Time on January 20, 2015. On March 6, 2016, the network premiered its own original programs co-produced with Twofour Productions and Zodiak Productions.

In November 2017, Justice Network and the Justice Network, LLC parent entity were placed into a new corporate parent, Cooper Media, which was also founded to serve as the owner of its documentary- and history-themed sister network Quest (which launched on several Tegna-owned or -operated stations in January 2018). In May 2019, it was announced that Tegna would acquire Cooper Media, thus becoming the parent company of Justice Network and Quest.

On July 13, 2020, it was announced by parent company Tegna that Justice Network would rebrand on July 27 as True Crime Network, capitalizing on the growing popularity of the true crime genre on television. The company will also release a free over-the-top streaming service of the same name that will feature programming live and on-demand.

== Programming ==
A limited number of stations carry traditional local newscasts or breaking news coverage on their True Crime subchannel, pre-empting the network's programming. This includes Milwaukee's WISN-TV and KOAT-TV in Albuquerque (both owned by Hearst Television, which both air a weeknight 9 p.m. newscast (both stations are in the Central and Mountain time zones, respectively), as WISN-TV has no other compatible subchannels or news share agreements, and KOAT's second subchannel carries the Spanish language network Estrella TV.

=== Crime and investigation programming ===
True Crime Network relies on crime and justice-related programming sourced from various production companies. As Justice Network, it aired a selection of programs previously broadcast on Court TV/TruTV until 2019, when Court TV was relaunched by the E. W. Scripps Company. Justice Network's syndication agreement with Turner Entertainment was announced with the network on November 10, 2014. The network's decision to focus on crime-focused programming is based on various factors in addition to viewer interest in the genre, as it is intended to help tie into its public service mission, and because the genre is of relatively low cost to acquire and produce compared to other fact-based genres.

No originally produced programming appeared on Justice Network at its launch, although plans were put forth to start developing original content within the network's first year. Indeed, Justice Network would develop two original series that were co-produced by the network – Killing Spree (produced in conjunction with TwoFour Productions) and Inside the Mind of a Serial Killer (produced with Zodiak Productions) – that premiered on March 6, 2016.

=== Public service ===
In addition, the network airs 90 seconds of public service announcements per hour within its commercial breaks, which are produced through partnerships with Crime Stoppers USA, the National Center for Missing and Exploited Children and a number of law enforcement agencies. As of 28 August 2017, this public service component, known as BeSAFE, has resulted in the capture of 101 fugitives and finding of 103 missing children. These PSAs consist of four different 30-second segments:

- "BeSAFE: Most Wanted" – a segment featuring a specific profile of a wanted fugitive accused of a violent or non-violent felony;
- "BeSAFE: Missing Children" – a report on a missing child (featuring information on when they were last seen before they were abducted or ran away and the child's statistics);
- "BeSAFE: Safety Tips" – a segment providing safety tips informing the public on how to prevent themselves from becoming victims of a crime or abduction.

The PSAs are mainly tailored to the specific region of the local True Crime Network affiliate, with additional information on the fugitives and missing children profiled available on the network's website. John Walsh, founder of the National Center for Missing and Exploited Children, serves as the network's on-air spokesperson and announcer of the PSA interstitials. John's son, National Center for Missing and Exploited Children child advocate Callahan Walsh, appears in the network's NCMEC safety and missing child profile PSAs, while Sgt. Ralph Woolfolk of the Atlanta Police Department (who, in his prior career as a child actor, was known for his role as Derek "Dee Dee" Parker in the 1990s Nickelodeon sitcom My Brother and Me) appears in the network's "BeSAFE" PSA interstitials.

== Affiliates ==
As of August 8, 2016, True Crime Network has current or pending affiliation agreements with television stations in 65 media markets (including 24 of the top 30), covering 57% of all households of at least one television set in the United States. The network is selective in the stations with which it affiliates, preferring those that maintain a local news department and community initiatives.

When its launch was announced, the network reached a charter affiliation agreement with the Gannett Company's broadcasting unit (now split into a separate company named Tegna as of June 29, 2015), which initially debuted the network on 22 of its television stations.

As a result of Live Well Network's initial plans to cease operations around the time of Justice Network's launch (later choosing to end national distribution of the former, and relegate it exclusively to ABC owned-and-operated stations owned by ABC Owned Television Stations in April 2015), some former LWN outlets owned by Gannett chose to become Justice Network affiliates at its launch. By August 2016, Justice Network had reached affiliation agreements with various other station groups including Hearst Television, Tribune Broadcasting, Media General, Gray Television and Univision Communications, which increased the network's national reach to encompass 57% of all U.S. television households. In September 2017, Univision began carrying the network on eleven additional Univision and UniMás owned-and-operated stations, expanding Justice Network's reach to 73% of the U.S.
