= 2016 United States wireless spectrum auction =

Process of reassigning frequency bands for new uses

The 2016 United States wireless spectrum auction, officially known as Auction 1001, allocated approximately 100 MHz of the United States Ultra High Frequency (UHF) spectrum formerly allocated to UHF television in the 600 MHz band. The spectrum auction and subsequent reallocations were authorized by Title VI (The Spectrum Act) of the payroll tax cut extension passed by the United States Congress on February 17, 2012.

== Background ==
The 2008 United States wireless spectrum auction, dealing with allocations for UHF television in the 700 MHz band, generated $19.6 billion from companies such as AT&T and Verizon Communications. This auction re-allocated the UHF space formerly occupied by channels 52–69, after the completion of the primary digital television transition in the United States from NTSC to ATSC in 2009. In effect, the digital transition had eliminated 25% of the space allocated for UHF television in the United States.

Wireless broadband internet access interests had expressed desire for more broadcast spectrum for their use, and in March 2009, Massachusetts Senator John Kerry introduced a bill requiring a study of efficient use of the spectrum. The lobbying group CTIA pressed for 800 MHz of additional spectrum. David Donovan of the Association for Maximum Service Television, seeing that further cuts of broadcast television UHF frequencies were being eyed, stated that the 2 GHz S band, allocated for mobile satellite service, was not being used ten years after its allocation, and would be an appropriate allocation target rather than demanding even more space in UHF broadcast ranges. The National Association of Broadcasters (NAB) and the AMST commented to the FCC that the government should make maximum use of the newly available 700 MHz UHF spectrum and other spectrum already allocated for wireless before asking for more, while companies that would benefit asked the government to look everywhere possible. Many broadcasters objected to further encroachment on the UHF broadcast spectrum.

A Consumer Electronics Association (CEA) study claimed that $62 billion worth of spectrum could become $1 trillion for wireless, and one proposal would require all TV stations, including LPTV, to give up all spectrum, with subsidized multichannel services replacing over-the-air TV, even after viewers spent a great deal of money on the DTV transition. Broadcasters responded, "In the broadcasting context, the 'total value' is not a strict financial measure, but rather is one that encompasses the broader public policy objectives such as universal service, local journalism and public safety." Broadcasters pointed out that the government, viewers and the related industries spent $1.5 billion making sure that a minority of the audience would be ready for the DTV transition. Any change could mean the loss of free TV to people in rural areas, broadcasters said, particularly "local journalism, universal service, availability of educational programming, and timely and reliable provision of emergency information."

Meredith Attwell Baker, a Republican FCC commissioner, agreed that properly using the existing spectrum was important, and part of doing this was using the latest technology. The wireless industry needed more spectrum, both licensed and unlicensed.

FCC broadband advisor Blair Levin wanted a plan by February 2010 (later extended to March 2010). Another proposal was "geo-filtered WiMAX", which would allow HDTV but only in a particular market, with the remainder of the spectrum sold for $60 billion. WiMax would replace the existing services but would make MVPD services cheaper, while still allowing broadcasters to make more money. The additional spectrum made available could then be sold to pay the industry's debt.

Bob Powers, vice president of government relations for the National Religious Broadcasters, pointed out that the Levin proposal did not provide for religious broadcasters.

In 2009, venture capitalist Tom Wheeler called broadcaster opposition a "jihad", but he went on to say broadcast TV was "without a doubt ... the most efficient means of delivering common content to a large audience." Wheeler was nominated for FCC chairman in 2013.

== Broadcaster resistance ==
Regarding the CEA study's findings, Donovan said to Broadcasting & Cable magazine:

Wireless companies are asking the government to participate in the biggest consumer bait-and-switch in American history. For the last few years, the government told consumers that digital television would bring them free over-the-air HDTV and more channels. Now, after purchasing billions of dollars in new digital equipment and antennas, wireless advocates are asking the government to renege on its promise. High-definition programming and more digital channels would become the sole and exclusive province of pay services. The American public simply will not stand for this.

PBS and its stations also opposed the plan, saying they had spent a lot of money on the digital upgrade which they need to earn back, and viewers had contributed expecting the digital broadcasting to continue. They claimed PBS was "efficient and productive, and abundantly serves the public interest." Noncommercial broadcasters said they needed broadcast spectrum for superior educational and children's programming. PBS said 85 percent of its stations used HDTV and 82 percent had two or more standard channels. Ohio State University said it had "no excess" spectrum, though it later sold WPBO in Portsmouth, Ohio (a satellite of WOSU-TV in Columbus) as part of the incentive auction due to an "incredible duplication of PBS signals" in the area.

An FCC workshop on November 23, 2009 produced several ideas. Virginia Tech professor Charles Bostian said sharing should be done, but not in the white spaces; WiFi spectrum should be used instead. Vint Cerf of Google said cable companies could share some spectrum, which the companies would like to do except they have "must-carry" rules that will not allow this. BBN Technologies chief engineer Chip Elliott called for government-funded broadband to be shared by researchers. Collaboration was the key to advancing the technology, and the word "collaboratories" referred to broadband as "not only the goal of the research, but the vehicle as well."

Wi-Fi testing using white spaces took place in Virginia in Fall 2009 and in Wilmington, North Carolina in 2010.

The National Association of Broadcasters (NAB) opposed ending broadcast TV because the industry spent $15 billion, in addition to giving up spectrum already. On December 14, 2009 at a hearing before the Communications Subcommittee of the House Energy & Commerce Committee, NAB president Gordon H. Smith said the government and individuals had spent too much money on the DTV transition and for HDTV for further changes to make their efforts worthless, and that broadband and broadcasting could co-exist. He pointed out that in the 1970s, broadcasting used 60 percent of the spectrum that it does now to deliver a much higher quality product, and that existing regulations required more efficient use of the spectrum than would be the case for new devices. On the subject of what could be done instead, Smith recommended using white space in rural areas with fixed devices rather than mobile devices, and new types of broadband service such as those developed by Sezmi.

CTIA president Steve Largent said that the industry needed spectrum, "wherever it comes from." He said government spectrum probably was not efficiently used and would "likely" be "repurposed", while other broadcast and satellite spectrum "may" be used better for wireless. Largent also said without more spectrum, companies might merge to better use what they had. Consultant Dave Hatfield, former FCC engineering and technology chief, said making maximum use of existing spectrum through compression and modulation would help, but it would not be enough. Oregon Republican House member Greg Walden criticized the FCC for hiring Distinguished Scholar in Residence Stuart Benjamin, whose essay recommending replacing broadcast spectrum entirely Walden called an "abomination".

== Plan announcement and preparations ==
On March 16, 2010, at the FCC's monthly meeting, Connecting America: The National Broadband Plan was revealed, with a combination of mandatory and voluntary efforts expected to increase spectrum by 300 MHz; 120 MHz of that was expected to come from broadcasters, and 90 MHz from mobile satellite service. By 2015, broadcasters would have to leave channels 46 through 51, allowing another 36 MHz to be used for wireless Internet access by "repacking", or relocating channels now on those frequencies. A total of 120 MHz needed to be reclaimed from broadcasters, the rest voluntarily. The FCC Chairman's Senior Counselor Colin Crowell explained that the spectrum crunch wasn't an imminent crisis, but rather "it's a crisis in five or six years." Failure to act could make Internet access more expensive and leave the United States less able to compete with other countries, the FCC report said. House Communications Subcommittee chairman Rick Boucher, a Virginia Democrat, said it would take four years from the time a bill passed to determine where the new spectrum would come from.

The FCC had 50 MHz of spectrum available for wireless broadband, but this was expected to increase to between 500 MHz and 800 MHz over 10 years. 300 MHz would be made available by 2015. The National Association of Broadcasters opposed the plan, issuing this statement:

We are concerned by reports today that suggest many aspects of the plan may in fact not be as voluntary as originally promised. Moreover, as the nation's only communications service that is free, local and ubiquitous, we would oppose any attempt to impose onerous new spectrum fees on broadcasters.

Mark Wigfield, broadband spokesman for the FCC, pointed out that even in the unlikely event all broadcasters in a market gave up their spectrum, the FCC would have to guarantee that some over-the-air service remained.

In April 2011, FCC chairman Julius Genachowski said "realigning" would be necessary if broadcasters did not volunteer, while Intel's Peter Pitsch told Congress "the repacking process should not be made voluntary." The NAB's Smith worried that the process could cause numerous problems for broadcasters and viewers. The spectrum auctions were authorized by Title VI (The Spectrum Act) of the payroll tax cut extension passed by Congress on February 17, 2012. A reverse auction would let broadcasters determine how much they were willing to take for giving up spectrum, while the sale of licenses to broadband providers would take place through a forward auction, in which proceeds would have to cover payments to broadcasters, costs of the auction, and costs of relocation.

On April 27, 2012, the FCC approved letting stations share spectrum using DTV subchannels, with all stations that had "full channels" keeping rights such as must-carry. At the first "reverse incentive auction" workshop on October 26, FCC Media Bureau chief Bill Lake said stations would not be able to decide their channel but could apply to change it.

At a September 30, 2013 workshop, broadcasters and equipment makers were asked what the changes would cost. The result was that answers would only be possible after the FCC said who would be moving and how. The Spectrum Act provided $1.75 billion for the reasonable expenses of relocating stations, and the money would have to be paid in three years without further action by Congress. Among the expenses would be meeting new tower standards for dealing with wind and ice, interim facilities so some stations would not be temporarily forced off the air, and translators in areas that needed them, mostly in the West. The FCC asked for comments to be received by November 4, 2013, with spectrum auctions coming later. Providers of wireless services recommended that broadcasters give up two channels, or 15 MHz, of Broadcast auxiliary service, which is used for relaying breaking news, but the NAB said this spectrum could be shared with the United States Department of Defense.

In March 2014, KLCS and KJLA conducted a channel sharing trial in partnership with CTIA and the Association of Public Television Stations, which tested the viability of broadcasting two sets of television services within the same 6 MHz channel band, including varying combinations of high and standard definition feeds. The experiment was deemed successful, although certain scenarios (particularly two HD feeds on both channels) were found to affect video quality on more complex content. Later in September 2014, KLCS announced that it would enter into a channel sharing arrangement with fellow public station KCET and participate in the 2015 auction.

In March 2014, the FCC voted to ban joint sales agreements—arrangements in which a station brokers the sale of its advertising to another station in the market, by making them count the same as outright ownership if the senior partner sells 15% or more of the brokering station's advertising, and give two years for station owners to unwind joint sales agreements that are in violation of the new rules. It was speculated that the move to ban JSAs was an attempt to devalue television stations (particularly, the smaller outlets that were commonly operated under JSA's and similar agreements), and in turn, push their owners to participate in the incentive auction. FCC Media Bureau Chief Bill Lake denied that the push to ban JSAs was connected to the spectrum auction.

== Broadcast incentive auction ==
The reverse and forward auctions to repack TV stations and free up spectrum for wireless communications would be implemented in several phases, with targets for how much spectrum would be reallocated, and a balance of payments needed to pay for the reverse auction plus transition costs with proceeds from the forward auction.

On April 18, 2014, the FCC announced guidelines for the auction. All stations would keep their coverage area as of February 22, 2012, if possible. Channel 37 would become a "guard band" between broadcasting and wireless services. Each station would be given a deadline to make its upgrades, with all stations expected to complete the transition after 39 months. Wheeler later said if stations could not meet the deadline, they would not necessarily have to go off the air. The FCC approved the framework 3-2, with the NAB claiming the commission had not met its obligation to compensate broadcasters and guarantee service for viewers.

In a July 2, 2015 filing, the Expanding Opportunities for Broadcasters Coalition (EOBC), representing over a hundred TV stations planning to participate in the incentive auction, said that population data was too important and could cause an $8.3 billion drop in opening prices without "relatively minor" changes. Because the incentive auction was a reverse auction, even these prices were the highest possible. On July 16, the FCC planned to make final the rules of the auction, including requiring stations to move to their new channels 39 months after the auction, and no reserved channel for noncommercial broadcasters. The procedures vote was moved to August 6 but the auction was set for March 29, 2016.

After the vote, FCC commissioner Ajit Pai said the plan "permits too many broadcasters to be placed in the wireless band", which would result in interference between TV stations and others using the band. Dennis Wharton, NAB executive vice president of communications, said that the vote minimized what stations would receive for giving up broadcasting, guaranteed numerous interference problems and gave "a handout of free spectrum with no public interest obligations to multibillion dollar companies" while hurting local television news and especially LPTV stations and translators. The LPTV Spectrum Coalition and CTIA objected to the vote, while the EOBC said no one would be happy but the compromise would be enough.

The NAB filed petitions asking for the FCC not to penalize stations that did not participate in the auction, and asking that stations not be moved to the duplex gap.

On October 15, the Applications Procedure Public Notice set the filing window as noon December 1 through 6 pm December 18 (this was later changed to December 8 through January 12). After that time, no more stations could join, but bids from those who did would not be final until March 29, 2016. The FCC released opening bid prices on October 16. These included three categories: stations giving up or sharing channels (which would mean the offering the full price), stations moving from UHF to high VHF (less than full price), and stations moving from high VHF to low VHF (lower than full price but not the lowest). Other factors were the number of people served and interference.

The FCC designated the auction as Auction 1001, with the purpose being to make 144 MHz available for resale to wireless companies. If that target was met, broadcasters would have been repacked into channels up to 26. If the minimum target of 42 MHz was met, channels up to 44 would have been used. The "clearing target" might not be met, in which case a lower target would have been set, with the process continuing until a target was reached. In each market where vacant channels remain, the FCC intends for one of those channels to be used for unlicensed devices.

The FCC announced the clearing target would be 126 MHz. This meant fewer channels for relocation of LPTV stations, which would not be protected after the auction. It was believed thousands of LPTV stations would have to be relocated. LPTV stations argued that because they were not allowed to participate in the process, they could lose spectrum. On May 5, Scott Caulkins of Caulkins & Bruce PC, representing one of the owners of LPTV stations, argued before the DC Circuit Court that the Spectrum Act and FCC authority gave LPTV stations "essentially the same [spectrum] rights" as full-power stations. He said they could only be considered secondary if they caused interference, but that the result of repacking would be more interference. FCC attorney Jacob Lewis said LPTV stations would be secondary and that considering their rights would mean too many stations to relocate.

Each bidder in the forward auction was required to bid on 95 percent of census blocks in which an interest was shown. As of August, Comcast, AT&T, T-Mobile, Verizon and others had submitted bids for 100 MHz of spectrum in the forward auction totaling over $11 billion, with the goal $88.4 billion.

Only $22.45 billion had been raised when the FCC ended stage one of the forward auction after two weeks. After the second stage of the reverse auction, the target for stage two of the forward auction was 114 MHz, with the desired goal $54.6 billion, enough for two channels per market. With less spectrum to be purchased, lower demand could mean lower costs for wireless providers. Failure of stage two could reduce the target further, to 108 MHz, or one channel per market. If stage three also fails, the target could even be 84 MHz, an additional four channels per market. The lower the target, the lower the amount paid to stations, but the fewer the number of public stations that could participate. And public stations that are not "repacked" must pay for their own equipment upgrades.

Stage two of the forward auction ended October 19 with $21.5 billion in total bids, $33.1 billion less than expected. The reverse auction's third stage began November 1 with a 108 MHz target. The number of paired blocks per market started at 10, reduced to 9 in stage two, and 8 in stage three. Four impaired blocks, with interference in less than 15 percent of an area, protected Mexican channels below 37. Two markets had interference in 15 to 50 percent of an area.

Stage three of the forward auction began December 5 after total bids for stage three were $40.3 billion for 108 MHz. Stage four of the reverse auction ended January 13, 2017 with $10.05 billion paid for 84 MHz, or seven licenses in each market. 70 MHz of that goes to the wireless companies, with 14 MHz for unlicensed use. With less spectrum cleared, fewer stations will move and none will be in the buffer or wireless bands.

Bidding ended March 30, and on April 12, the FCC announced the completion of the incentive auction. The auction raised $19.8 billion and made more spectrum available for faster 5G service. Nearly $10.1 billion goes to 175 TV stations, $7.3 billion to the United States Treasury, and $1.8 billion to assist with the repacking process. Lawrence Chu, an advisor to the FCC during the bidding process, considered the auction a success while admitting that "there will be some people disappointed on the broadcaster side."

T-Mobile paid almost $8 billion for 1,525 licenses representing 45 percent of low-band spectrum, giving the company coverage of the entire country and about four times the spectrum it had, while Dish Network spent $6.2 billion on 486 licenses and Comcast received 73 licenses for its $1.7 billion bid. AT&T bid $910 million 23 licenses and U.S. Cellular bid $328.6 million on 188 licenses.

== Repacking ==
The collective moves of UHF and VHF television stations to accommodate the elimination of the 600 MHz band came to be known as repacking. With the advent of virtual channels after the transition to digital television in 2009, it was possible for any given broadcast channel to change frequencies while still retaining their long-standing channel numbers for identification and branding purposes. The issue arose that if a television viewer's station changes its frequency, their television will not be aware of the shift (even if the virtual channel remains the same), unless they perform a rescan: forcing their television to scan all ATSC digital channels for signals.

The estimated number of channels moving is still over 1,000. Although moving channels by region was considered, which would work better for the companies doing the work, channels would instead move according to which moves are related. 710 stations were part of "a sort of interference daisy-chain", meaning the stations had to work with each other, and that it was unlikely stations could meet the deadline or complete the process using the funds allocated. Some stations would be required to go off the air or have temporary facilities or temporary channel sharing (though the FCC was reluctant to ask viewers to rescan twice, and the Cable Act did not allow "must carry" requirements for stations that used temporary facilities). So-called "bottleneck stations", if they did share, would allow the spectrum to be used by wireless services sooner without interrupting broadcast service. Weather delays and important rating events would also need to be considered. Companies doing the work might also have their own reasons for how they schedule work. The NAB filed comments October 28, 2016 asking that the 39-month deadline for moving be changed, or allow waivers. The repack would take place in ten phases, and Michael Dell's OTA Broadcasting asked the FCC to provide information on bottleneck stations so that they could be given incentives to give up licenses or move to temporary channels.

The Transition Scheduling Plan from the Media Bureau and the Incentive Auction Task Force divided stations into ten phases. Each phase had a testing period. Until this time, stations could not use their new channel. After the completion period, stations could no longer use their old channel. Stations needing to move to new channels would have 90 days to file for construction permits. Stations giving up their licenses would have 90 days to leave their pre-auction channels after receiving auction proceeds. Stations entering channel-sharing agreements would have 6 months to finish the process after receiving auction proceeds. Priority would be given to clearing the 600 MHz for wireless use.

With less spectrum cleared than expected, fewer stations were moving, and the $1.75 billion cost of relocating was expected to be enough. Also, a February 23, 2017 vote to approve voluntary adoption of ATSC 3.0 meant broadcasters could upgrade to the new standard and to 4K and interactive capability at the same time as repacking.

The FCC did not need for 400 of the 2,200 eligible stations to participate, and the total number who did may not be known for two years. Only 175 of the remaining 1,800 needed to be paid. Out of those, twelve did not indicate they would continue broadcasting. 133 stations planned to share, 29 were moving from UHF to VHF, and one was moving from high-VHF to low-VHF. The FCC released the list of new channel assignments, and the 39-month moving process began April 13, 2017. The first moves took place by November 30, 2018. The final phase of moves was completed on July 3, 2020.

Rep. Frank Pallone introduced a bill on July 20, 2017 allowing another billion dollars if necessary for repacking. Pallone said one use for the money would be moving FM stations located on the same towers as TV stations. LPTV stations and translators could also be helped by the bill, and T-Mobile said it would also help those stations with their costs. Pallone had introduced a discussion draft in January 2016 in case the estimates of costs were wrong. Emphasizing the importance of local news, Pallone said at that time, "[I]t is critical that we make this transition as seamless as possible for consumers without interruptions in their service." Senator Jerry Moran introduced the Viewer and Listener Protection Act July 26. The Ray Baum Act that passed the House of Representatives provided for additional funding once it became clear $1.75 billion would not be enough, and for radio stations, LPTV stations and translators. It also provided $50 million to explain the changes to viewers.

12 TV stations faced an October 25, 2017 deadline to give up their licenses. 13 other stations had planned to share but instead went off the air. 120 other stations that announced they would share channels had a January 23, 2018 deadline, which could be extended six months. $10 billion was paid to 175 stations; 30 of which were moving from UHF to VHF, or high VHF to low VHF.

LPTV stations were not protected and many would have to apply for new channels. It was expected that more than one station in an area would want the same channel, leading to auctions.

== Making government spectrum available ==
With the incentive auction completed, FCC Commissioner Michael O'Rielly proposed incentives for the federal government to give up some of its spectrum for use by companies. Without the profit incentive found in the private sector, federal agencies had little reason for efficient use of their spectrum. O'Rielly's proposal could give budget relief to agencies giving up spectrum.

== "Spectrum speculators" ==
Beginning in 2010, a large number of television station acquisitions began to occur among a group of companies referred to as "spectrum speculators". Backed by private equity groups, these companies have primarily purchased smaller, low-rated stations within or in close proximity to major markets, with an intent to possibly sell the stations and their licenses during the incentive auction, and no interest in their future operation as a television station. Among these "speculators" have included the Blackstone Group-owned LocusPoint Networks, the Fortress Investment Group-backed NRJ TV LLC, and Michael Dell's OTA Broadcasting. Spectrum speculators do not typically identify themselves as being broadcasting companies, but as part of the wireless industry, and often affiliate with low-demand or 'leftover' networks such as Retro Television Network, Youtoo America and AMGTV to maintain some kind of broadcast service.

Public concerns surrounding spectrum speculators surfaced in 2013 with the announcement that Atlantic City's NBC affiliate WMGM-TV would be sold to LocusPoint Networks, and a belief by local residents that the fate of WMGM was in jeopardy because of their position as a speculator. In response to the concerns (which also included viewers establishing a Save NBC 40 website), LocusPoint co-founder Bill deKay stated that they planned to continue operating the station as an NBC affiliate, and allowed Access.1 to continue operating the station on its behalf through December 31, 2014. At the same time, however, NBC declined to renew the station's affiliation past December 31, 2014. On January 1, 2015, the station began carrying Soul of the South programming instead, but the station's fate following the spectrum auction remained unclear. Access.1 retained most of the station's staff to form a new news operation, which eventually moved to a new low-VHF station, WACP. Following the auction, Univision Communications filed to acquire the station.
