= Video on demand =

Media distribution system

Video on demand (VOD) is a media distribution system that allows users to access television shows, films, and videos digitally on request. These multimedia are accessed without a traditional video playback device and a typical static broadcasting schedule, which was popular under traditional broadcast programming, instead involving newer modes of content consumption that have risen as Internet and IPTV technologies have become prominent, and culminated in the arrival of VOD and over-the-top (OTT) media services on televisions and personal computers.

Television VOD systems can stream content either through a traditional set-top box or through devices such as digital media players, Smart TVs, computers, tablets, and smartphones. VOD users may also permanently download content to a device such as a computer, digital video recorder (DVR) or a portable media player for continued viewing. The majority of cable and telephone company–based television providers offer VOD streaming, whereby a user selects a video programme that begins to play immediately (i.e., streaming), or downloading to a DVR rented or purchased from the provider, or to a PC or to a portable device for deferred viewing.

Streaming media has emerged as an increasingly popular medium of VOD provision over downloading, including BitTorrent. Desktop client applications such as the Apple iTunes online content store and Smart TV apps such as Amazon Prime Video allow temporary rentals and purchases of video entertainment content. Other Internet-based VOD systems provide users with access to bundles of video entertainment content rather than individual movies and shows. The most common of these systems, such as Netflix, Hulu, Disney+, Peacock, HBO Max and Paramount+, use a subscription model that requires users to pay a monthly fee for access to a selection of movies, television shows, and original series (known as streaming television service). In contrast, YouTube, another Internet-based VOD system, uses an advertising-funded model in which users can access most of its video content free of charge but must pay a subscription fee for premium content. Some airlines offer VOD services as in-flight entertainment to passengers through video screens embedded in seats or externally provided portable media players.

== Functionality ==
Downloading and streaming VOD systems provide the user with features of portable media players and DVD players. Some VOD systems store and stream programs from hard disk drives and use a memory buffer to allow the user to fast-forward and rewind videos. It is possible to put video servers on local area networks; these can provide rapid responses to users. Cable companies have rolled out their own versions of VOD services through apps, allowing television access wherever there is a device that is Internet capable. Cable media companies have combined VOD with live streaming services. The early-2020s launches of apps from cable companies (e.g., NBC's Peacock, CBS's Paramount+) are attempts to compete with subscription video on demand (SVOD) services because they lack live news and sports content. Streaming video servers can serve a wide community via a WAN, but responsiveness may be reduced. Download VOD services are practical in homes equipped with cable modems or DSL connections. Servers for traditional cable and telco VOD services are usually placed at the cable head-end, serving a particular market, and cable hubs in larger markets. In the telco world, they are placed in either the central office or a newly created location called a Video Head-End Office (VHO).

== History ==
=== Development and early constraints ===
VOD services first appeared in the early 1990s. Until then, it was not thought possible that a television programme could be squeezed into the limited telecommunication bandwidth of a copper telephone cable to provide a VOD service of acceptable quality as the required bandwidth of a digital television signal is around 200 Mbps, which is 2,000 times greater than the bandwidth of a speech signal over a copper telephone wire.

VOD services were only made possible as a result of two major technological developments: MPEG (motion-compensated DCT) video compression and asymmetric digital subscriber line (ADSL) data transmission.

=== Early plans and trials ===
Plans such as those of the Integrated Network System, a national high-capacity fibre-optic network supporting a range of broadband services in Japan, noted in a more general 1986 publication, were interpreted as conducive to eventual VOD deployment. However, early VOD trials employed existing cable television infrastructure, notably British Telecom's video library trial, operated through the Westminster Cable Company. This trial used the Laservision media format and featured a jukebox-like media handling system involving players served by disc carousels, with twelve such handler units capable of serving up to 6,000 customers. Other early VOD systems used tapes as the real-time source of video streams. GTE started as a trial in 1990, with AT&T providing all components. By 1992, VOD servers were supplying previously encoded digital video from disks and DRAM. In November 1992, Bell Atlantic announced a VOD trial. IBM was developing a video server code-named Tiger Shark. Concurrently, Digital Equipment Corporation (DEC) was developing a scalable video server configured from small-to-large for a range of video streams. Bell Atlantic selected IBM and in April 1993 the system became the first VOD over ADSL to be deployed outside the lab, serving 50 video streams. In June 1993, US West filed for a patent to register a proprietary system consisting of the Digital Equipment Corporation Interactive Information Server, Scientific Atlanta providing the network, and 3DO as the set-top box with video streams and other information to be deployed to 2,500 homes. In 1994–95, US West filed for a patent concerning the provision of VOD in several cities: 330,000 subscribers in Denver, 290,000 in Minneapolis, and 140,000 in Portland. In early 1994, British Telecommunications (BT) introduced a trial VOD service in the United Kingdom. It used the DCT-based MPEG-1 and MPEG-2 video compression standards, along with ADSL technology.

Many VOD trials were held with various combinations of server, network, and set-top box. Of these the primary players in the US were the telephone companies using DEC, Microsoft, Oracle, IBM, Hewlett-Packard, USA Video, nCube, SGI, and other servers. The DEC server system was the most-used in these trials.

In the UK, from September 1994, a VOD service formed a major part of the Cambridge Digital Interactive Television Trial. This provided video and data to 250 homes and several schools connected to the Cambridge Cable network, later part of NTL, now Virgin Media. The MPEG-1 encoded video was streamed over an ATM network from an ICL media server to set-top boxes designed by Acorn Online Media. The trial commenced at a speed of 2 Mbit/s to the home, subsequently increased to 25 Mbit/s. The content was provided by the BBC and Anglia Television. Although a technical success, difficulty in sourcing content was a major issue and the project closed in 1996.

=== United States regulatory and infrastructure developments ===
In the US, the 1982 anti-trust break-up of AT&T resulted in several smaller telephone companies nicknamed Baby Bells. Following this, the Cable Communications Policy Act of 1984 prohibited telephone companies from providing video services within their operating regions. In 1993, the National Communication and Information Infrastructure (NII) was proposed and passed by the US House and Senate, opening the way for the seven Baby Bells—Ameritech, Bell Atlantic, BellSouth, NYNEX, Pacific Telesis, Southwestern Bell, and US West—to implement VOD systems. These companies and others began holding trials to set up systems for supplying video on demand over telephone and cable lines.

The DEC Video and Interactive Information Server architecture used a hierarchy of interactive gateways and gateway proxies to set up video streams and other information for delivery from any of a large number of VAX servers, enabling it in 1993 to support more than 100,000 streams with full videocassette recorder (VCR)-like functionality. In 1994, it upgraded to a DEC Alpha–based computer for its VOD servers, allowing it to support more than a million users. By 1994 the Oracle scalable VOD system used massively parallel processors to support from 500 to 30,000 users. The SGI system supported 4,000 users. The servers connected to networks of increasing size to eventually support video stream delivery to entire cities.

=== Commercial launches ===
In 1997, Enron Corporation had entered the broadband market, constructing and purchasing thousands of miles of fiber-optic cables throughout the United States. In 2001, Enron and Blockbuster Inc. attempted to create a 20-year deal to stream movies on demand over Enron's fiber-optic network. The heavily promoted deal failed, with Enron's share prices dropping following the announcement.

In 1998, Kingston Communications became the first UK company to launch a fully commercial VOD service and the first to integrate broadcast television and Internet access through a single set-top box using IP delivery over ADSL. By 2001, Kingston Interactive TV had attracted 15,000 subscribers. After several trials, Home Choice followed in 1999 but was restricted to London. After attracting 40,000 customers, they were bought by Tiscali in 2006 which was, in turn, bought by Talk Talk in 2009. Cable TV providers Telewest and NTL (now Virgin Media) launched their VOD services in the United Kingdom in 2005, competing with the leading traditional pay-TV distributor BSkyB, which responded by launching Sky by broadband, later renamed Sky Anytime on PC. The service went live on 2 January 2006. Sky Anytime on PC uses a legal peer-to-peer approach based on Kontiki technology to provide very-high-capacity multi-point downloads of the video content. Instead of the video content all being downloaded from Sky's servers, the content comes from multiple users of the system who have already downloaded the content. Other UK television broadcasters implemented their own versions of the same technology, such as Channel 4's 4oD (4 on Demand, now known as All 4) which was launched on 16 November 2006 and the BBC's iPlayer, which was launched on 25 December 2007. Another example of online video publishers using legal peer-to-peer technology is based on Giraffic technology, which was launched in early 2011, with large online VOD publishers such as US-based VEOH and UK-based Craze's Online Movies Box movie rental service.

=== System requirements ===
Unlike broadcast television, which traditionally has been the most common in the form of over-the-air television, VOD systems initially required each user to have an Internet connection with considerable bandwidth to access each system's content. In 2000, the Fraunhofer Institute IIS developed the JPEG2000 codec, which enabled the distribution of movies via Digital Cinema Packages. This technology has since expanded its services from feature-film productions to include broadcast television programmes and has led to lower bandwidth requirements for VOD applications. Disney, Paramount, Sony, Universal and Warner Bros. subsequently launched the Digital Cinema Initiative, in 2002.

The BBC, ITV and Channel 4 planned to launch a joint platform provisionally called Kangaroo in 2008. This was abandoned in 2009 following complaints, which were investigated by the Competition Commission. In that same year, the assets of the now-defunct Kangaroo project were acquired by Arqiva, who used the technology to launch the SeeSaw service in February 2010. A year later, however, SeeSaw was shut down due to a lack of funding.

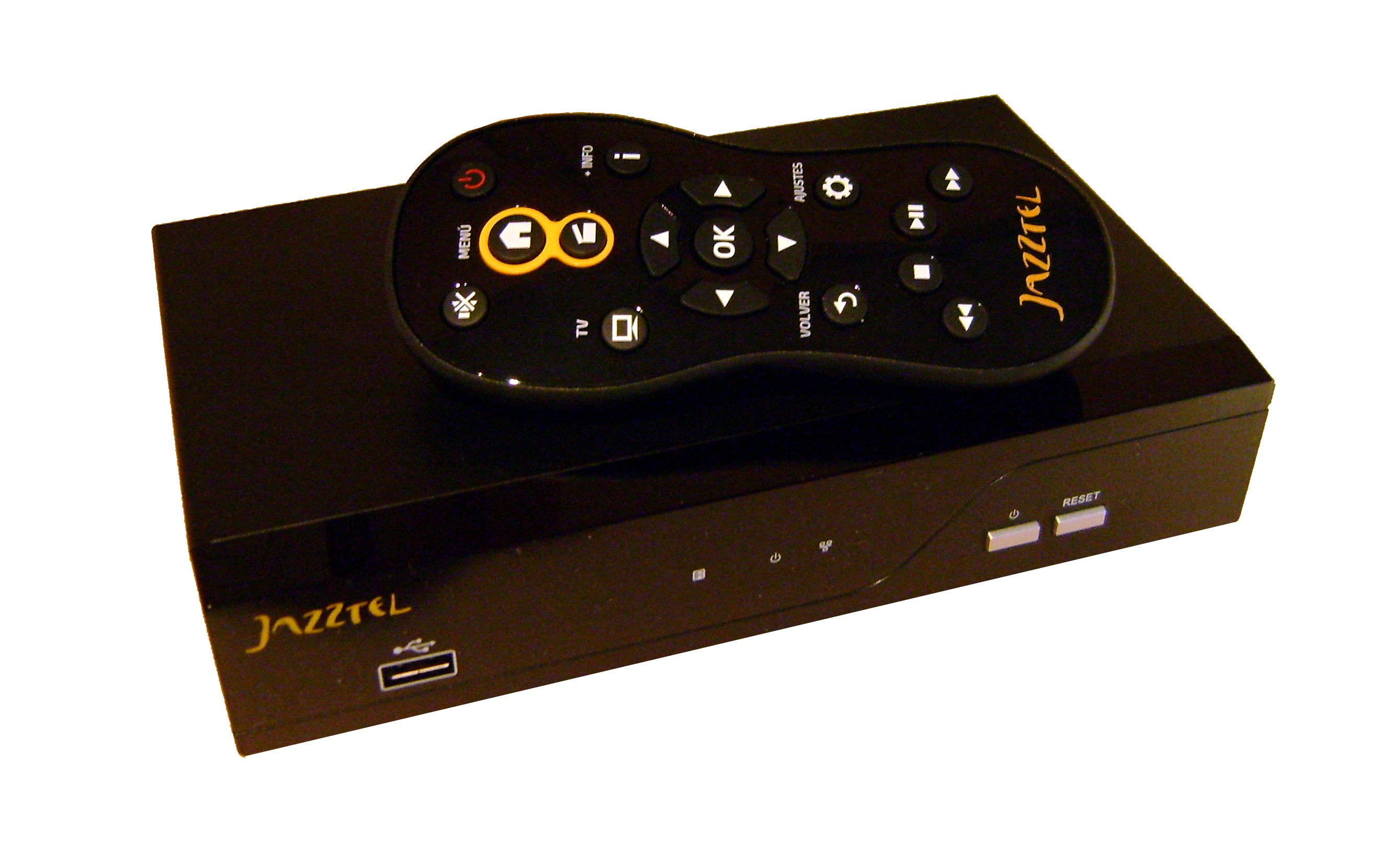
Some VOD services require the viewer to have a TV set-top box. This photo shows the set-top box for the Jazzbox VOD service and its accompanying remote control.

=== Rollout at scale ===
VOD services are now available in all parts of the United States, which has the highest global take-up rate of VOD. In 2010, 80% of American Internet users had watched video online, and 42% of mobile users who downloaded video preferred apps to a normal browser. Streaming VOD systems are available on desktop and mobile platforms from cable providers (in tandem with cable modem technology). They use the large downstream bandwidth present on their cable systems to deliver movies and television shows to end-users. These viewers can typically pause, fast-forward, and rewind VOD movies due to the low latency and random-access nature of cable technology. The large distribution of a single signal makes streaming VOD impractical for most satellite television systems. Both EchoStar/Dish Network and DirecTV offer VOD programming to PVR-owning subscribers of their satellite TV service. In Demand is a cable VOD service that also offers pay-per-view. Once the programs have been downloaded onto a user's PVR, he or she can watch, play, pause, and seek at their convenience. VOD is also common in expensive hotels.

According to the European Audiovisual Observatory, 142 paying VOD services were operational in Europe at the end of 2006. The number increased to 650 by 2009. At the 2010 Consumer Electronics Show in Las Vegas, Nevada, Sezmi CEO Buno Pati and president Phil Wiser showed a set-top box with a one-terabyte hard drive that could be used for video-on-demand services previously offered through cable television and broadband. A movie, for example, could be sent out once using a broadcast signal rather than numerous times over cable or fiber-optic lines, and this would not involve the expense of adding many miles of lines. Sezmi planned to lease part of the broadcast spectrum to offer a subscription service that National Association of Broadcasters President Gordon H. Smith said would provide a superior picture to that of cable or satellite at a lower cost.

=== Commercial viability ===
Developing VOD requires extensive negotiations to identify a financial model that would serve both content creators and cable providers while providing desirable content for viewers at an acceptable price point. Key factors identified for determining the economic viability of the VOD model include VOD movie buy-rates and setting Hollywood and cable operator revenue splits. Cable providers offered VOD as part of digital subscription packages, which by 2005 primarily allowed cable subscribers to only access an on-demand version of the content that was already provided in the linear traditional broadcasting distribution. These on-demand packages sometimes include extras and bonus footage in addition to the regular content.

== Role of peer-to-peer file sharing ==
Peer-to-peer (P2P) file-sharing software allows the distribution of content without the linear costs associated with centralised streaming media. This innovation proved it is technically possible to offer the consumer potentially every film ever made, and the popularity and ease of use of such services may have motivated the rise of centralised video-on-demand services. Some services such as Spotify use peer-to-peer distribution to better scale their platforms. Netflix was reported to be considering switching to a P2P model to cope with net neutrality problems from downstream providers.

== VOD data analysis ==
When technology companies include SVOD apps on their devices, such as cellphones, tablets, computers, game systems, and Smart TVs, this can remove an attitude obstruction for a user to view content. This technology also provides an advantage for technology companies for data analysis of viewed content from consumers. By analyzing data of what is viewed most by consumers, companies can purchase more content that is aimed for an audience, and then in-turn market products that are based on what viewer profiles are of a group of consumers who viewer a specific amount of content. This data analysis will often provide researchers valuable data that includes: what was watched, when it was watched, what they watched after watching, and even how many people watched the same video at the same time in a day, month, and even year.

== Types ==
=== Advertising video on demand (AVOD) ===
Advertising video on demand (AVOD) uses an advertising-based revenue model. This allows companies that advertise on broadcast and cable channels to reach people who watch shows using VOD. This model also allows people to watch content without paying subscription fees. Hulu was a major AVOD company before ending its free service in August 2016, transferring it to Yahoo! View using the existing Hulu infrastructure. Crackle has introduced a series of advertisements for the same company that ties into the content that is being watched.

=== Ad-supported video on demand (ASVOD) ===
Ad-supported video on Demand (ASVOD) refers to video services that provide free content supported by advertisements. Popular services include Amazon Freevee, Crackle, Dailymotion, Movies Anywhere, Pluto TV, Popcornflix, The Roku Channel, Samsung TV Plus, Tubi, Vudu, Xumo, and YouTube. Walmart is adding ASVOD original programming to Vudu, and YouTube Originals will be ASVOD by 2020.

=== Near video on demand (NVOD) ===
Near video on demand (NVOD) is a pay-per-view consumer video technique used by multi-channel broadcasters using high-bandwidth distribution mechanisms such as satellite and cable television. Multiple copies of a programme are broadcast at short time intervals (typically staggered on a schedule of every 10–20 minutes) on linear channels providing convenience for viewers, who can watch the programme without needing to tune in at the only scheduled point in time.

A viewer may only have to wait a few minutes before the next time a movie will be programmed. This form is bandwidth-intensive, reduces the number of channels a provider can offer, and is generally provided by large operators with a great deal of redundant capacity. This concept has been reduced in popularity as video on demand is implemented, along with providers often wanting to provide the maximum throughput for their broadband services possible.

The satellite services DirecTV and Dish Network continue to provide NVOD services, as they do not offer broadband and much of their rural customer base has access to slower dial-up and non-5G wireless and satellite internet options which cannot stream films or have data caps (and where possible, AT&T is now prioritizing their streaming service AT&T TV, which utilizes a fully immediate VOD experience, over DirecTV).

Before the rise of VOD, the cable pay-per-view provider In Demand provided up to 40 channels in 2002, with several films receiving four channels on a staggered schedule to provide the NVOD experience for viewers. As of 2018, most cable pay-per-view channels now number mainly 3–5, and are used mainly for live ring sports events (boxing and professional wrestling), comedy specials, and concerts, though the latter two sources are declining due to streaming services offering much more lucrative performance contracts to performers, and several ring sports organisations (mainly UFC and WWE) now prefer direct marketing of their product via streaming services such as ESPN+, the WWE Network, and the apps of Fox Sports over pay-TV providers which require a portion of the profits they otherwise retain directly. In Australia, pay-TV broadcaster Foxtel offers NVOD for new-release movies over their satellite service.

Edge Spectrum, an American holder of low-power broadcasting licenses, has an eventual business plan to use its network and a system of digital video recorders to simulate the video-on-demand experience. Most of Edge Spectrum's channels, where they are on air, carry televangelism.

=== Premium video on demand (PVOD) ===
Premium video on demand (PVOD) is a version of TVOD which allows customers to access video-on-demand content several weeks or months earlier than their customary TVOD or home video availability – often feature films made available alongside, or in place of, a traditional release in movie theaters – but at a much higher price. A version of the model was tested in 2011 by American satellite TV provider DirecTV under the brand name "Home Premiere", which allowed viewers to rent select films from major studios for US$30 per rental as soon as 60 days after they debuted in cinemas, compared to 120 days for the regular TVOD window; this version only lasted a few months.

PVOD made a return during the COVID-19 pandemic and the resulting global closures of cinemas. Certain films that had already been released including The Invisible Man were quickly also released on VOD platforms for a higher rental price than usual, while other films including Trolls World Tour were released simultaneously on PVOD and in drive-in theaters, or in some cases directly to PVOD only.

In most cases, these PVOD releases are offered through most of the same platforms as traditional TVOD, but at a higher price, typically about US$20 for a 48-hour rental; this offering has again been branded as "Home Premiere" by some studios and platforms. Disney used the September 2020 release of the live-action remake of Mulan to launch a related model called Premier Access; this requires customers to pay a premium fee (approximately US$26–30 depending on country) on top of a subscription to the Disney+ streaming service, but they then retain access as long as they maintain their subscription (for Mulan, this was effectively a 90-day rental, as the film became available to all Disney+ subscribers at no extra charge in December).

It has been reported that the pandemic had contributed to a transformation in movie distribution in favor of PVOD over traditional movie houses, as studios were able to realize 80% of revenue through PVOD versus 50% of traditional theater box office receipts. Theater owners including AMC and Cinemark, as well as suppliers including IMAX and National CineMedia, all experienced significant drops in revenues during shutdowns related to COVID-19.

=== Push video on demand ===
Push video on demand (Push VOD) is so-named because the provider "pushes" the content out to the viewer's set-top box without the viewer having requested the content. This technique is used by several broadcasters on systems that lack the connectivity and bandwidth to provide true "streaming" video on demand. Push VOD is also used by broadcasters that want to optimize their video streaming infrastructures by pre-loading the most popular contents to the consumers' set-top device. If the consumer requests one of these films, it is already loaded on her or his DVR.

A push VOD system uses a personal video recorder (PVR) to store a selection of content, often transmitted in spare capacity overnight or all day long at low bandwidth. Users can watch the downloaded content at the time they desire, immediately and without any buffering issues. Push VOD depends on the viewer recording content so choices can be limited.

=== Subscription models (SVOD) ===
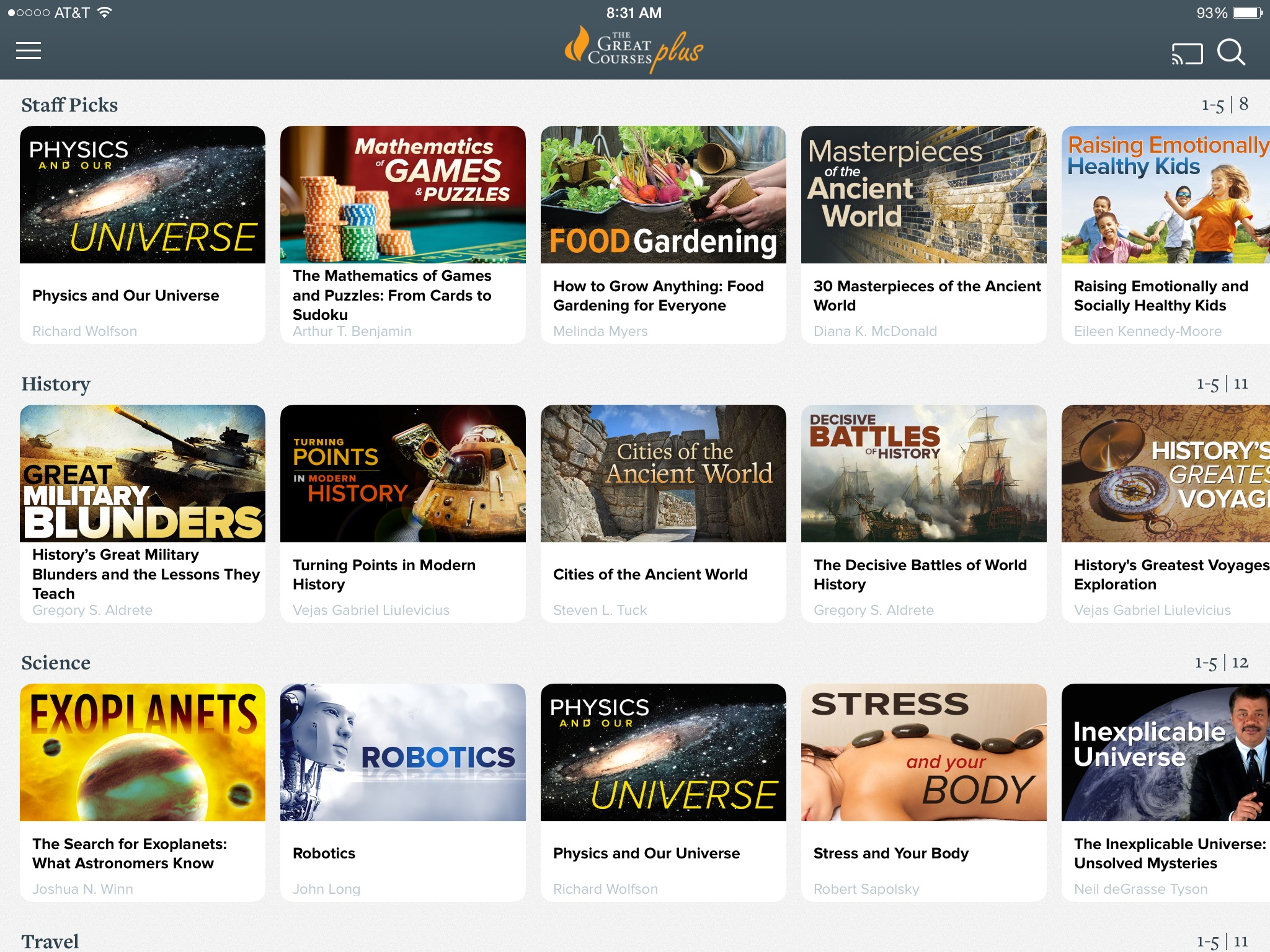
A screenshot of a subscription video on-demand service showing a typical visual catalog interface of video content

Subscription video on demand (SVOD) services use a subscription business model in which subscribers are charged a regular fee to access unlimited programs. Examples of these services include Amazon Prime Video, Apple TV, BET+, BritBox, Canal+, Coupang Play, Crunchyroll, Discovery+, Disney+, GulliMax, Hayu, HBO Max, Hidive, Hulu, iQIYI, iWant, JioHotstar, Netflix, Paramount+, Peacock, Philo, SonyLIV, Star+, TVING, Viu, and ZEE5.

==== Economics of SVOD ====
Attendance in movie theaters had declined during the 2020 COVID-19 pandemic. Worldwide in 2019, theatrical entertainment reach 11.4 billion dollars, but in 2020, it was only 2.2 billion. Due recovery efforts to increase those attendance numbers, along with the growing amount of marketing that is need to gain the attention of an audience, pinning down an exact budget for a film production can be difficult. Video on demand can have three release strategies that include: day-and-date (instantaneous release in theaters and on VOD), day-before-date (VOD before theatrical viewing), and VOD only. Production studios can make revenue on these types of releases until sales start to slow. After that, film companies can then license the content to other streaming services and, temporarily, make extra income like that too.

In a reflection made by 2013 Netflix Chief Content Officer, Ted Sarandos, he was quoted saying, "When we launch in a territory the BitTorrent traffic drops as the Netflix traffic grows." This can be valuably interpreted as in that online piracy numbers drop the more that SVOD companies grow, which in turn means more revenue going back to the production companies.

==== Behavior detrimental to SVOD revenue ====
Online piracy is detrimental to production companies that produce digital content. In a study that offered BitTorrent users a free SVOD subscription, the results of the research provided readers with information that show download and upload speeds in those homes decreased with a free subscription, but it could not prove decreased use in BitTorrent software.

=== Transactional video on demand (TVOD) ===
Transactional video on demand (TVOD) is a distribution method by which customers pay for each piece of video-on-demand content. For example, a customer would pay a fee for each movie or TV show that they watch. TVOD has two sub-categories: electronic sell-through (EST), by which customers can permanently access a piece of content once purchased via the Internet; and download to rent (DTR), by which customers can access the content for a limited time upon renting. Examples of TVOD services include the Apple iTunes Store and the Google Play Store, as well as VOD rental services offered through multichannel television (i.e., cable or satellite) providers.

== See also ==
- Comparison of video hosting services
- Direct-to-video
- Music on demand
- National Streaming Day
