= Acorn Online Media Set Top Box =

The Acorn Online Media Set Top Box was produced by the Online Media division of Acorn Computers Ltd for the Cambridge Cable and Online Media Video on Demand trial and launched early 1996. Part of this trial involved a home-shopping system in partnership with Parcelforce.

The hardware was trialled by NatWest bank, as exhibited at the 1995 Acorn World trade show.

== Specification ==
=== STB1 ===
The STB1 was a customised Risc PC based system, with a Wild Vision Movie Magic expansion card in a podule slot, and a network card based on Asynchronous Transfer Mode.

- Memory: 4 MiB RAM
- Processor: ARM 610 processor at 33 MHz; approx 28.7 MIPS
- Operating system: RISC OS 3.50 held in 4 MiB ROM

=== STB20 ===
The STB20 was a new PCB based around the ARM7500 System on a Chip.

- Memory: 32 MiB RAM
- Processor: ARM7500 processor
- Operating system: RISC OS 3.61, a version specific for this STB, held in 4 MiB ROM.

=== STB22 ===
By this time Online Media had been restructured back into Acorn Computers, so the STB22 is branded as 'Acorn'.

- Memory:
- Processor:
- Operating system: a development of RISC OS held in 4 MiB ROM
