= UHF television broadcasting =

Ultra high frequency radio to transmit TV

UHF Television Broadcasting
- Ultra High Frequency Television Broadcasting
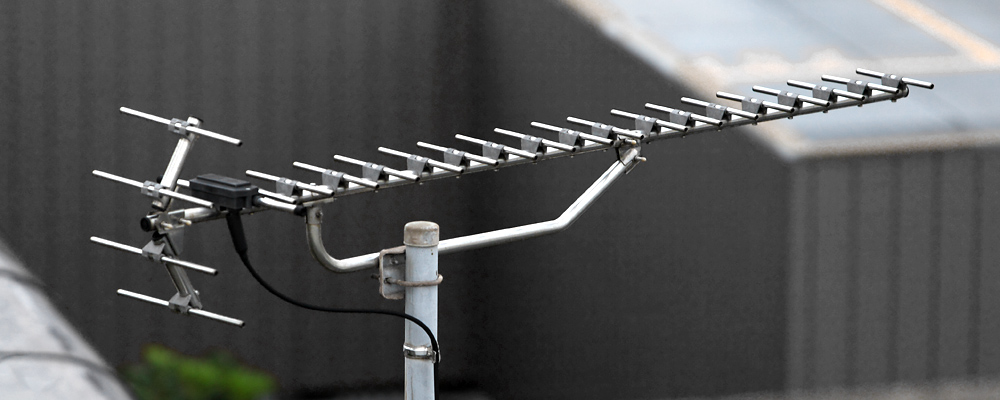
- A standard rooftop UHF television antenna.
- Abbreviation: UHF TV
- Status: Active (transitioning globally from analog to digital formats)
- Year started: 1952
- Organization: International Telecommunication Union (ITU)
- Base standards: Radio frequency transmission
- Related standards: VHF, ATSC, DVB-T, ISDB, DTMB
- Domain: Television broadcasting

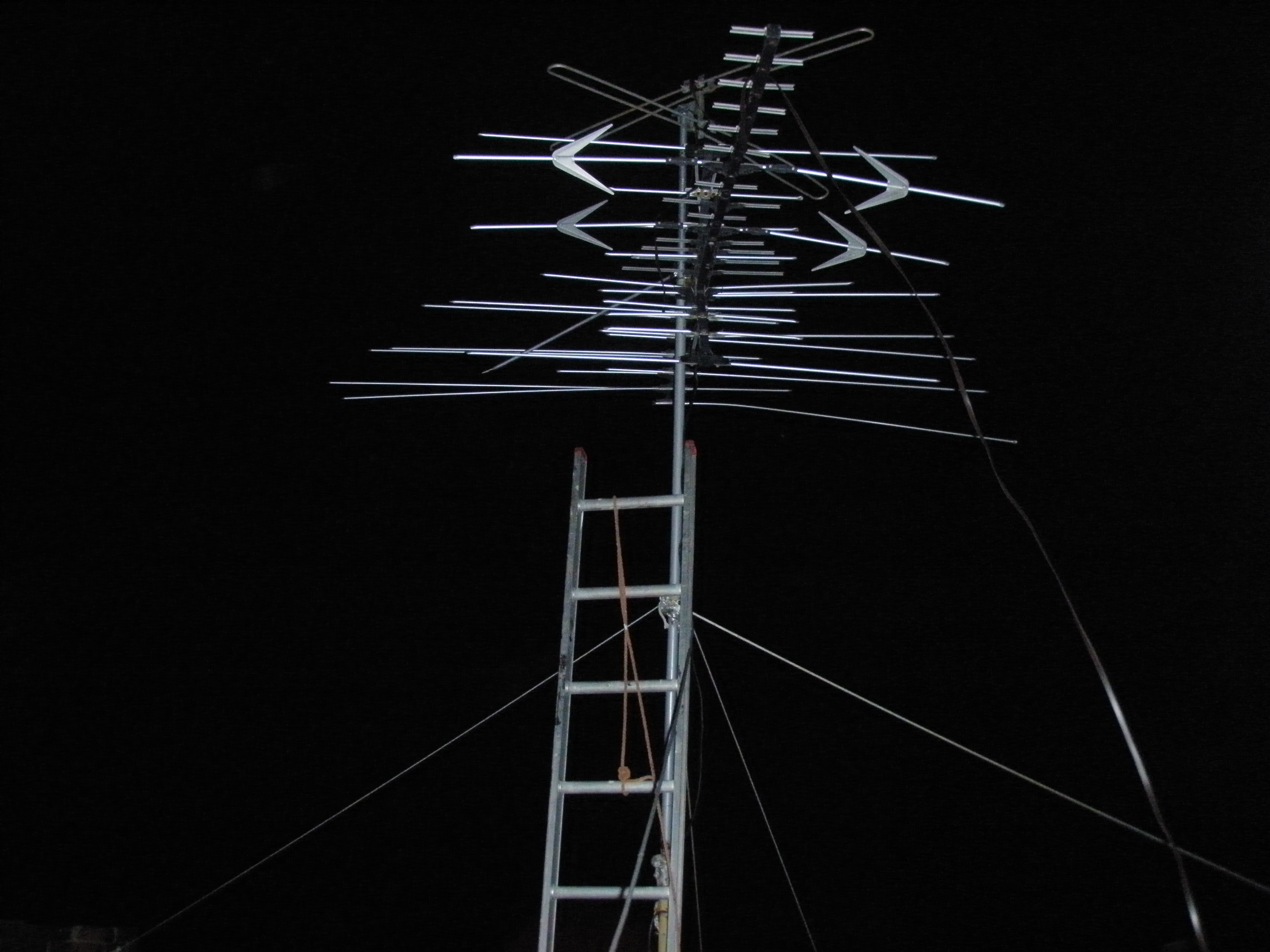

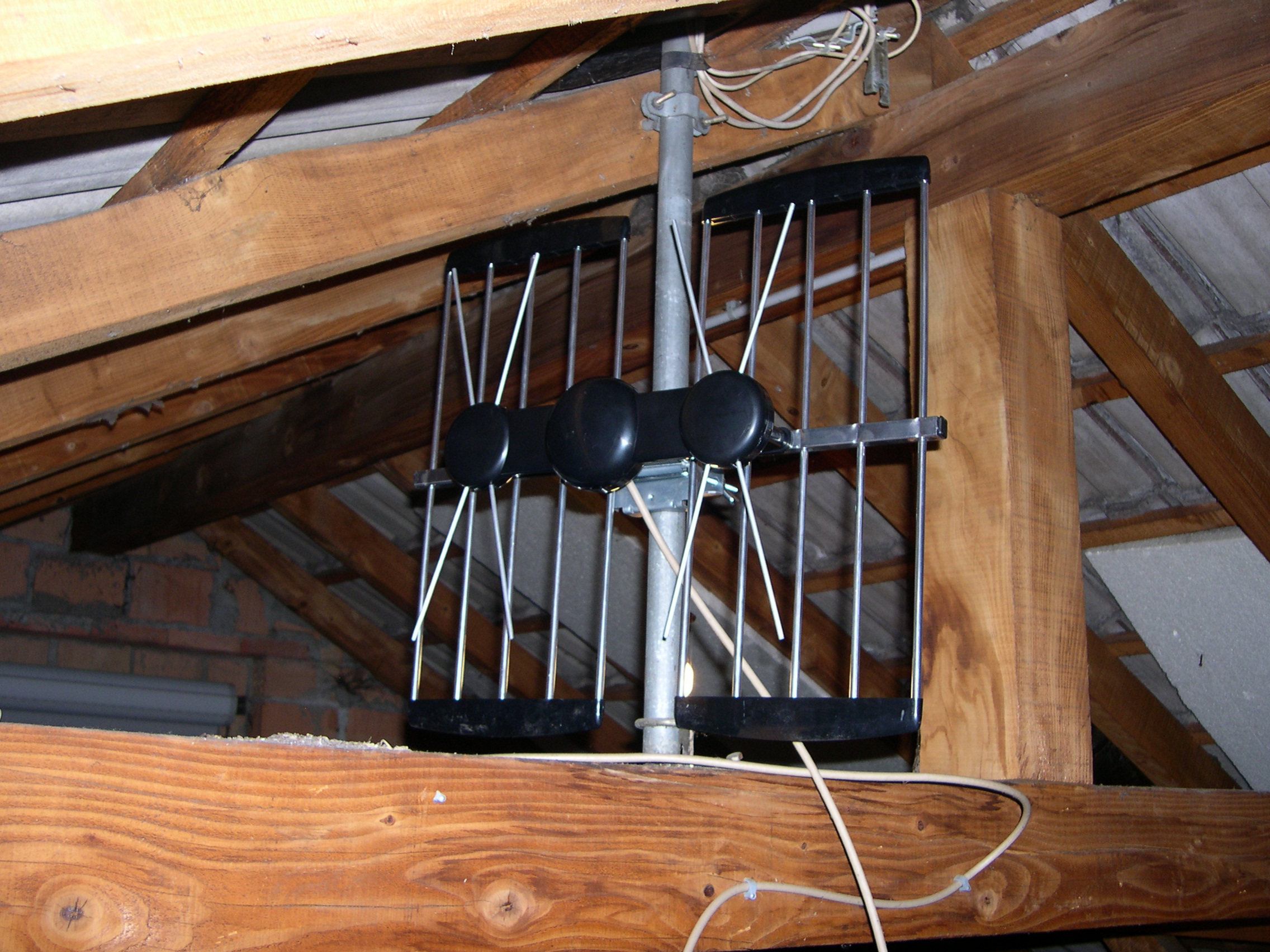

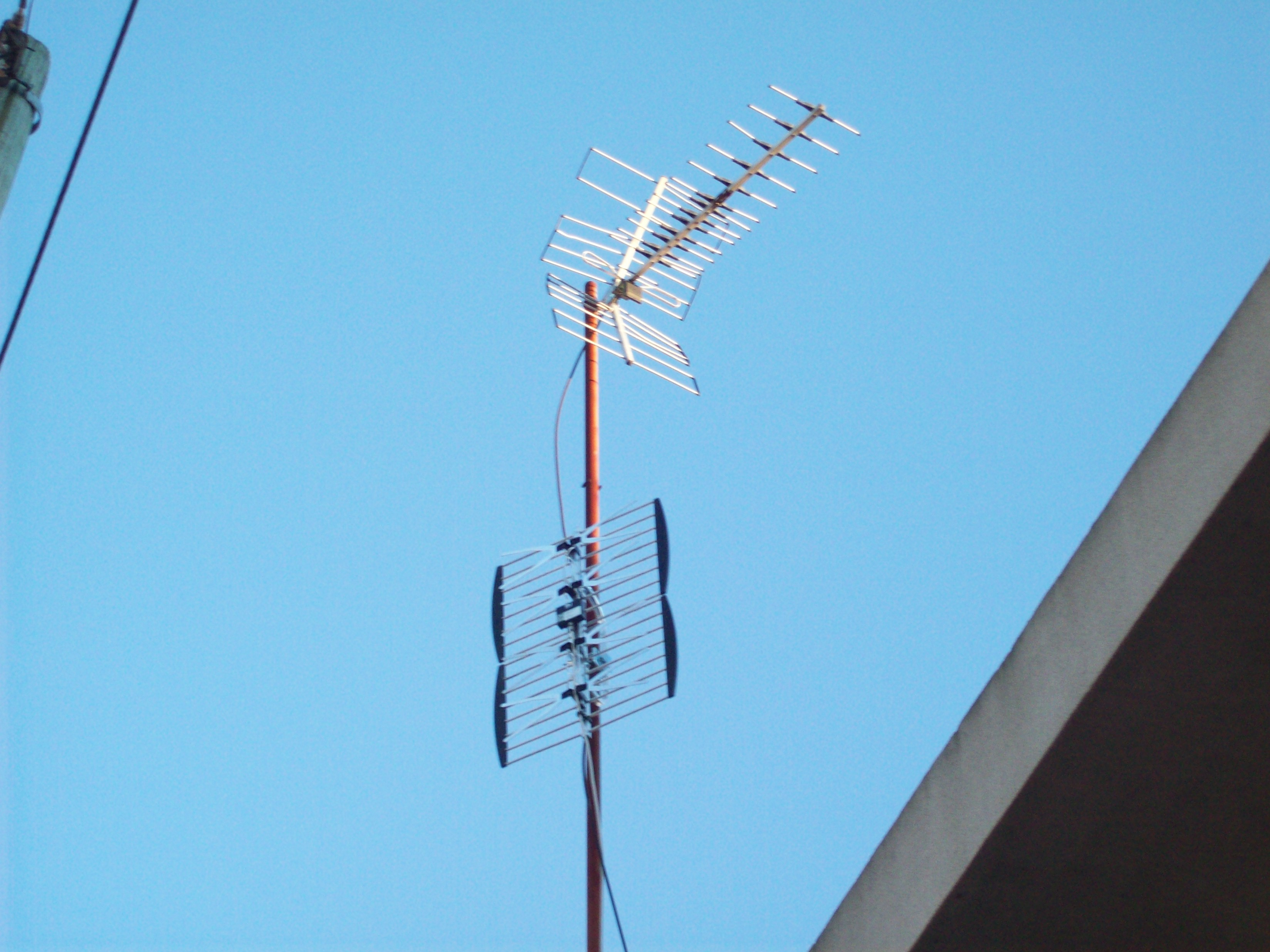
This mast has two UHF antennas for receiving signals from different directions. The lower antenna is a bowtie array. The upper antenna is a Yagi design.

UHF television broadcasting is the use of ultra high frequency (UHF) radio for over-the-air transmission of television signals. UHF frequencies are used for both analog and digital television broadcasts. UHF channels are typically given higher channel numbers, like the US arrangement with VHF channels (initially) 1 to 13, and UHF channels (initially) numbered 14 to 83. Compared with an equivalent VHF television transmitter, to cover the same geographic area with a UHF transmitter requires a higher effective radiated power, implying a more powerful transmitter or a more complex antenna. However, the additional channels allow more broadcasters in a given region without causing objectionable mutual interference.

UHF broadcasting became possible due to the introduction of new high-frequency vacuum tubes developed by Philips immediately prior to the opening of World War II. These were used in experimental television receivers in the UK in the 1930s, and became widely used during the war as radar receivers. Surplus tubes flooded the market in the post-war era. At the same time, the development of color television was taking its first steps, initially based on incompatible transmission systems. The US FCC set aside a block of the then-unused and now-practical UHF frequencies for color television use. The introduction of the backward compatible NTSC standard led to these channels being released for any television use in 1952.

Early receivers were generally less sensitive at UHF band reception, and the signals are also subject to more environmental interference. Additionally, the signals are less susceptible to diffraction effects, which can improve reception at long range. UHF generally had less clear signals, and for some markets, became the home of smaller broadcasters who were not willing to bid on the more coveted VHF allocations. These issues are greatly reduced with digital television, and today most over-the-air broadcasts take place on UHF, while VHF channels are being retired. To avoid giving the impression that channels were disappearing, digital broadcast systems have a virtual channel concept, allowing stations to display their original VHF channel number while actually broadcasting on a UHF frequency.

Over time a number of former television channels in the upper UHF band have been re-designated for other uses. Channel 37 was never used in the US and some other countries in order to prevent interference with radio astronomy. In 1983, the US FCC reassigned channels 70 through 83 to the Land Mobile Radio System. In 2009, with the move to digital television complete in the US, channels 52 through 69 were reallocated as the 700 MHz band for cellular telephone service. In 2011, Channel 51 was removed to prevent interference with the 700 MHz cellular band. Additionally, in 2019 the US removed channels 38 through 50 to use them for cellular phone service. Thus UHF TV in the US now only includes channels 14 through 36.

== UHF vs VHF ==
The most common type of antennas rely on the concept of resonance. Conductors, normally metal wires or rods, are cut to a length so that the desired radio signal will create a standing wave of electrical current within them. This means that antennas have a natural size, normally 1/2 of a wavelength long, which maximizes performance. Antennas designed to receive the same signal will almost always have similar dimensions.

Because the antenna size is based on the wavelength, UHF broadcasting can be received with much smaller antennas than VHF while still having the same gain. For instance, Channel 2 in the North American television frequencies is at 54 MHz, which corresponds to a wavelength of 5.5 m, and thus requires dipole antenna about 2.75 m across. In comparison, the lowest channel in the UHF band, Channel 14, is on 470 MHz, a wavelength of 64 cm, or a dipole length of only 32 cm. A powerful VHF antenna using the log-periodic design might be as long as 3 m, while a UHF Yagi antenna with similar gain is often found placed in front of it, occupying perhaps 1 m. Modern UHF-only antennas often use the bedspring array and are less than a meter on a side.

Another effect due to the shorter wavelength is that UHF signals can pass through smaller openings than VHF. These openings are the spaces between any metal in the area, including lines of nails or screws in the roof and walls, electrical wiring, and the frames of doors and windows. A metal-framed window will present almost no barrier to a UHF signal, while a VHF signal may be attenuated or strongly diffracted. For stations with strong signals, UHF antennas mounted beside the television are relatively useful, and medium-distance signals 25–50 kilometres (16–31 mi) away can often be picked up by attic mounted antennas.

On the downside, higher frequencies are less susceptible to diffraction. This means that the signals will not bend around obstructions as readily as a VHF signal. This is a particular problem for receivers located in depressions and valleys. Normally the upper edge of the landform acts as a knife-edge and causes the signal to diffract downwards. VHF signals will be seen by antennas in the valley, whereas UHF bends about 1/10 as much, and far less signal will be received. The same effect also makes UHF signals more difficult to receive around obstructions. VHF will quickly diffract around trees and poles and the received energy immediately downstream will be about 40% of the original signal. In comparison, UHF blockage by the same obstruction will result on the order of 10% being received.

Another difference is the nature of the electrical and radio noise encountered on the two frequency bands. UHF bands are subject to constant levels of low-level noise that appear as "snow" on an analog screen. VHF more commonly sees impulse noise that produces a sharp "blip" of noise, but leaves the signal clear at other times. This normally comes from local electrical sources, and can be mitigated by turning them off. This means that at a given received power, a UHF analog signal will appear worse than VHF, often significantly.

For these reasons, in order to allow UHF stations to provide the same ground coverage as VHF, ideally about 60 miles (97 km), the FCC allowed UHF broadcasters to operate at much higher power levels. For analog signals in the United States, VHF signals on channels 2 to 6, the low-VHF range, were limited to 100 kW, high-VHF on channels 7 to 13 to 316 kW, and UHF to 5 MW, well over 10 times the power of the low-VHF transmitter power limit. This greatly increased the cost of transmitting in these frequencies, both in electrical cost as well as the upfront cost of the equipment needed to reach those power levels.

The introduction of digital television (DTV) changed the relative outcome of these effects. DTV systems use a system known as forward error correction (FEC) which adds information to the signal to allow it to correct errors. This works well if the error rate is well known, in which case a fixed amount of extra information is added to the signal to correct for these errors. This works well with the type of constant low-level interference found on UHF, which FEC can effectively eliminate. In comparison, VHF noise is largely unpredictable, consisting of periods of little noise followed by periods of almost complete signal loss. Forward error correction cannot easily address this situation. For this reason, DTV broadcasting was initially going to take place entirely on UHF.

In the US, the FCC initially wanted to move all stations to UHF. This would have required a large number of stations to move out of their current VHF channel assignments. Moving from one UHF channel to another is a fairly simple exercise and generally costs little to accomplish. Moving from VHF to UHF is a much more expensive proposition, generally requiring all new equipment, and a dramatic increase in power in order to maintain the same service area. DTV offsets the latter to a great degree, with the current FCC power limitations at 1 MW for UHF, 1/5 the former limits.

Nevertheless, moving from a 100 kW low-VHF analog signal to a 1 MW UHF signal is still a considerable change, which some broadcasters estimated could cost up to $4 million per station (although most estimates were much lower, on the order of $400,000). For this reason, channels in the high-VHF region were kept for television use. The power of the stations on these channels was also reduced, to 160 kW, about one-third of the earlier limit. Stations making the transition generally acquired a second channel allocation in the upper UHF region to test their new equipment, and then moved into the low-UHF or high-VHF once the conversion period was over. This adds some complexity to the system as a whole, as the antennas needed to receive VHF and UHF are very different.

== Australia ==
In Australia, UHF was first anticipated in the mid-1970s with TV channels 27–69. The first UHF TV broadcasts in Australia were operated by Special Broadcasting Service (SBS) on channel 28 in Sydney and Melbourne starting in 1980, and translator stations for the Australian Broadcasting Corporation (ABC). The UHF band is now used extensively as ABC, SBS, commercial and public-access television services have expanded, particularly through regional areas.

== Canada ==
The first Canadian television network was publicly owned Radio-Canada, the Canadian Broadcasting Corporation. Its stations, as well as that of the first private networks (CTV and TVA, created in 1961), are primarily VHF. More recent third-network operators that initially signed on in the 1970s or 1980s were often relegated to UHF, or (if they were to attempt to deploy on VHF) to reduced power or stations in outlying areas. Canada's VHF spectrum was already crowded with both domestic broadcasts and numerous American TV stations along the border.

The use of UHF to provide programming that otherwise would not be available, such as province-wide educational services (BC's Knowledge: channel, or TVOntario - the first UHF originating station in Canada), (Télé-Québec, French language programming outside Québec and ethnic/multilingual television services), has therefore become common. Third networks such as Quatre-Saisons or Global often will rely heavily on UHF stations as repeaters or as a local presence in large cities where VHF spectrum is largely already full. The original digital terrestrial television stations were all UHF broadcasts, although some digital broadcasts returned to VHF channels after the digital transition was completed in August 2011.

Digital Audio Broadcasting, deployed on a very limited scale in Canada in 2005 and largely abandoned, uses UHF frequencies in the L band from 1452 to 1492 MHz. There are currently no VHF Band III digital radio stations in Canada as, unlike in much of Europe, these frequencies are among the most popular for use by television stations.

== Ireland ==
In the Republic of Ireland, UHF was introduced in 1978 to augment the existing RTÉ One VHF 625-line transmissions and to provide extra frequencies for the new RTÉ Two channel. The first UHF transmitter site was Cairn Hill in County Longford, followed by Three Rock Mountain in South County Dublin. These sites were followed by Clermont Carn in County Louth and Holywell Hill in County Donegal in 1981. Since the analogue television switchoff on October 24, 2012, all digital terrestrial TV is on UHF only, although VHF allocations exist. The UHF band has been used in parts of Ireland for television deflector systems bringing British television signals to towns and rural areas that cannot receive these signals directly. However, since the introduction of free to air satellite transmission of UK TV channels these deflectors have largely ceased operation.

== Japan ==
In Japan, an Independent UHF Station (ja:全国独立UHF放送協議会, Zenkoku Dokuritsu Yū-eichi-efu Hōsō Kyōgi-kai; literally National Independent UHF Broadcasting Forum) is one of a loosely knit group of free commercial terrestrial television stations that is not a member of the major national networks keyed in Tokyo and Osaka.

Japan's original broadcasters were VHF. Although some experimental broadcasts were made as early as 1939, NHK (founded in 1926 as a radio network modeled on the BBC) began regular VHF television broadcasting in 1953. Its two terrestrial television services (NHK General TV and NHK Educational TV) appear on VHF 1 and 3, respectively, in the Tokyo region. Privately owned Japanese VHF TV stations were most often built by large national newspapers with Tokyo stations exerting a large degree of control over national programming.

The number of VHF broadcasters varied depending on the prefecture. For example, in the Kanto region, there were seven VHF channels available. Outside of Tokyo, Osaka, Nagoya, and Fukuoka, most prefectures had four privately owned television stations, with three of them broadcasting on UHF. Almost all prefectures had at least one privately owned VHF television station (except for Saga).

The independent stations broadcast in analogue UHF, unlike major networks, which were historically broadcast primarily in analogue VHF. The loose coalition of UHF independents is operated mostly by local governments or metropolitan newspapers with less outside control. Compared with major network stations, Japan's UHF independents have more restrictive programming acquisition budgets and lower average ratings; they are also more likely to broadcast single episode or short-series UHF anime (many of which serve to promote DVD's or other product tie-ins) and brokered programming such as religion and infomercials.

Japanese terrestrial television was converted entirely to digital UHF starting in December 2003, with all analogue television signals (both VHF and UHF) being terminated between 2010 and 2012. The analogue translators in northeastern Ishikawa Prefecture were shut down as part of a technical trial on 24 July 2010; analogue signals in the rest of that prefecture and 43 other prefectures were terminated on 24 July 2011. The analogue transmitters in the prefectures of Iwate, Miyagi, and Fukushima were switched off on 31 March 2012.

== Malaysia ==
UHF broadcasting was used outside Kuala Lumpur and the Klang Valley by private TV station TV3 in the late 1980s, with the government stations only transmitting in VHF (Bands 1 and 3) and the 450 MHz range being occupied by the ATUR cellular phone service operated by Telekom Malaysia. The ATUR service ceased operation in the late 1990s, freeing up the frequency for other uses. UHF was not commonly used in the Klang Valley until 1994 (despite TV3's signal also being available over UHF Channel 29, as TV3 transmitted over VHF Channel 12 in the Klang Valley). 1994 saw the introduction of the channel MetroVision (which ceased transmission in 1999, got bought over by TV3's parent company – System Televisyen Malaysia Berhad – and relaunched as 8TV in 2004). This was followed by Ntv7 in 1998 (also acquired by TV3's parent company in 2005) and recently Channel 9 (which started in 2003, ceased transmission in 2005, was also acquired by TV3's parent company shortly after, and came back as TV9 in early 2006). At current count, there are 6 distinct UHF signals receivable by an analog TV set in the Klang Valley: Channel 27 (8TV), Channel 29 (TV3 UHF transmission), Channel 37 (NTV7), Channel 42 (TV9), Channel 55 (TV Alhijrah) and Channel 39 (WBC). Channel 35 is usually allocated for VCRs, decoder units (i.e. the ASTRO and MiTV set top boxes) and other devices that have an RF signal generator (i.e. game consoles).

== New Zealand ==
Refer to Australian and New Zealand television frequencies for more information.

== Philippines ==
UHF broadcasting was introduced in the Philippines in the early 1960s when FEN Philippines began broadcasts on channel 17 in Pampanga and Zambales (as in Subic and Clark bases), and channel 43 in Bulacan and also in Metro Manila on Channel 50 until 1991 (most of its programs and newscasts are from a satellite feed directly from their U.S. military bases in Japan), at the time when Mount Pinatubo erupted and became abandoned. Commercial UHF stations began on May 30, 1992, as DWCP-TV on channel 21 became the first local UHF TV station in Metro Manila by the Southern Broadcasting Network as SBN-21 (then Talk TV) and commenced free programing, the second channel, DWKC-TV (on channel 31) of the Radio Mindanao Network was launched on October 31 of the same year as CTV-31 from 1992 to 2000 (then E! from 2000 to its inactivity 2003 and BEAM which returned in 2011). The third channel, DZRJ-TV (channel 29) was also launched on May 3, 1993, for the Rajah Broadcasting Network, Inc. which specializes niche programing (mostly infomercials, foreign shows and cartoons). Two more channels include DWDB-TV (channel 27) of GMA Network, Inc. (as Citynet Television from 1995 to 1999 and EMC from 1999 to 2001) and DWAC-TV (channel 23) of ABS-CBN (as Studio 23) between August 27, 1995, and October 12, 1996, as fourth and fifth UHF stations, and the sixth and the last, DWDZ-TV (channel 47) of the Associated Broadcasting Company on April 4, 1999, but it was silent on January 16, 2003 due to unknown reasons. UHF channels in Metro Manila were used as an alternative to cable television which offered free programing for households in the target markets and became popular in the 1990s. Similarly, pay services were also introduced in late 1992, when DWBC-TV on channel 68 began initial transmissions as a paid UHF station offers foreign programs not shown on local TV and commencing regular service in January 1993, but it was closed down as a result from intense competition from the rival Sky Cable. From 2001 to the present, more channels were established, regional stations are established in the provinces which specialize news, public service and free programming.

With Digital TV was introduced, all UHF channels will allocate their frequencies and can be served for broadcast companies such as ABS-CBN, GMA Network and TV5, among others as the National Telecommunications Commission plans to migrate all VHF channels to digital UHF channels before December 31, 2015, though this was delayed several times. Digital terrestrial television services are currently in development by the major broadcasting companies before the Implementing Rules and Regulations (IRR) will be passed by law.

== South Africa ==
South Africa only received analog TV service from 1976 onwards. There were three TV channels: TV1 (now SABC1), TV2 (now SABC2), TV3 (now SABC3), and later came the fourth, Etv.

== United Kingdom ==
In the UK, UHF television began in 1964 following a plan by the General Post Office to allocate sets of frequencies for 625-lined television to regions across the country, so as to accommodate four national networks with regional variations (the VHF allocations allowed for only two such networks using 405 lines). The UK UHF channels would range from 21 to 68 (later extended to 69) and regional allocations were in general grouped close together to allow for the use of aerials designed to receive a specific sub-band with greater efficiency than wider-band aerials could. Aerial manufacturers would therefore divide the band into over-lapping groups; A (channels 21–34), B (39–53), C/D (48–68) and E (39–68). The first service to use UHF was BBC2 in 1964 followed by BBC1 and ITV (both already broadcast on VHF) in 1969 and Channel 4/S4C in 1982. PAL colour was introduced on UHF only in 1967 (for BBC2) and 1969 (for BBC1 & ITV).

As a consequence of achieving maximum national coverage, signals from one region would typically over-lap with that of another, which was accommodated for by allocating a different set of channels in each adjacent area, often resulting in greater choice for viewers when a network in one region aired different programmes to the neighbouring region.

Initial uptake of UHF television was very slow: Differing propagation characteristics between VHF and UHF meant new additional transmitters needed to be built, often at different locations to the then-established VHF sites, and in general with a larger number of relay stations to fill the greater number of gaps in coverage that came with the new band. This led to poor picture quality in bad coverage areas, and many years before the service achieved full national coverage. In addition to this, the only exclusively UHF service, BBC2, would run for only a few hours a day and run alternative programming for minority audiences in contrast to the more populist schedules of BBC1 and ITV. However the 1970s saw a large increase in UHF TV viewing while VHF took a significant decline: The appeal of colour, which was never introduced to VHF (despite preliminary plans to do so in the late 1950s and early 1960s) and the fall in television prices saw most households use a UHF set by the end of that decade. With the second and last VHF television service having launched in 1955, VHF TV was finally decommissioned for good in 1985 with no plans for it to return to use.

The launch of Channel 5 in 1997 added a fifth national television network to UHF, requiring deviation from the original frequency allocation plan of the early 1960s and the allocation of UHF frequencies previously not used for television (such as UK Channels 35 and 37, previously reserved for RF modulators in devices such as domestic videocassette recorders, requiring an expensive VCR re-tuning programme funded by the new network). A lack of capacity within the band to accommodate a fifth service with the complex over-lapping led to the fifth and final network having a significantly reduced national coverage compared to the other networks, with reduced picture quality in many areas and the use of wide-band aerials often required.

The launch of digital terrestrial television in 1998 saw the continued use of UHF for television, with six multiplexes allocated for the service, all within the UHF band. Analogue transmissions have ceased completely since 2012 after which the vacated capacity was used for additional digital television services and put into alternative use, such as mobile telecommunications or internet services.

== United States ==
=== The need for the UHF band ===
Bandwidth for television in the United States was allocated by the Federal Communications Commission (FCC) in 1937, solely in the VHF (Very High Frequency) band, across 18 channels. American television broadcasting began experimentally in the 1930s with regular commercial broadcasting in cities such as New York in 1941. Efforts at TV broadcasting on any channel were drastically curtailed once World War II began, due largely to lack of available receivers. The upper five VHF channels were removed from the FCC allocation list during the war with those frequencies re-allocated for military use, leaving thirteen channels (1 through 13) as of May 1945.

The end of the war brought rapid expansion in the nascent broadcast television industry. Thirteen VHF channels was found to be insufficient to support the desired expansion of broadcast television across the United States. Interference and channel crowding in densely populated areas (such as the eastern mid-Atlantic states) was a particular problem. This bandwidth crunch was made even worse by the need to re-allocate VHF Channel 1 to land-mobile radio systems in 1948 due to radio-interference problems. To illustrate the channel crowding problem, the following cities were never allocated any VHF-TV stations at all, due to technical reasons found by the FCC: Huntsville, Alabama; Peoria, Illinois; Fort Wayne, Indiana; South Bend, Indiana, Lexington, Kentucky; Springfield, Massachusetts; Elmira, New York; Youngstown, Ohio; Scranton/Wilkes-Barre, Pennsylvania; and Yakima, Washington. Other cities were able to receive only one VHF broadcast station. The entire state of New Jersey would receive only one VHF broadcast station of its own (which was to ultimately become WNET 13 Newark). Similarly, Delaware also had only one VHF station.

Meanwhile, UHF broadcasting until 1949 was designated as experimental. In the fall of 1944, the Columbia Broadcasting System proposed a high-definition black and white system on the UHF band employing 750–1,000 scanning lines that offered the possibility of higher-definition monochrome and color broadcasting, both then were precluded from the VHF band because of their bandwidth demands; more significantly, it offered the possibility for sufficient numbers of conventional 6 MHz channels to support the FCC's goals of a "truly nationwide and competitive service". CBS was not trying to maximize broadcast (or network) competition through freer market entry. Instead CBS's 16 MHz channels would have allowed only 27 UHF channels versus the 82 channels possible under the standard 6 MHz bandwidth. CBS Vice President Adrian Murphy told the FCC: "I would say that it would be better to have two networks in color" instead of the four or more networks possible with narrower bandwidths in UHF.

In October 1948, the Federal Communications Commission stopped accepting applications for new stations, a freeze expected to last "six months to a year". The freeze would give the FCC and broadcasting interests time to address questions such as the allocation of additional channel frequencies, and the selection of a color television standard. At the time of the freeze, less than 100 stations were on the air, but stations already under construction would be allowed to complete work. All but one of these was on the VHF band; on December 29, 1949, KC2XAK of Bridgeport, Connecticut, became the first and only pre-1950 UHF television station to operate on a regular daily schedule. Existing FCC rules at the time of the freeze had designated 42 UHF channels, designated 14–55, between 475 and 890 MHz.

=== Freeze on new television stations (1948) ===
Ultimately, the question the FCC faced of how to allocate bandwidth for new television licenses would not take "months" to resolve, but several years. To newer entrants into TV broadcasting such as the American Broadcasting Company and DuMont Television Network, the need for additional TV channels in major markets was urgent. For proponents of educational TV broadcasting, the difficulties in competing with commercial broadcasters for the increasingly scarce VHF channels was also a problem.

Allocating more of the VHF band (30 to 300 MHz) by moving existing radio communication users away seemed to be impossible. FM radio broadcasting had already suffered a huge setback after a forced move from a 42–50 MHz allocation to an 88–108 MHz allocation in 1946. This had rendered all pre-1946 FM transmitters and receivers obsolete, and there was heavy resistance to moving FM a second time. Aeronautical radio is located above 108 MHz; military aeronautical radio used 225–400 MHz. Additional public safety, commercial land-mobile, and amateur radio services had allocations in Band II. It was impractical and uneconomic to require these well-established VHF users to move to other frequencies, such as the 300 MHz – 3 GHz UHF band.

All of this made expansion of broadcast television channels into the UHF band inevitable, though the technology and broadcasting characteristics of UHF was at this time largely unproven. Even the television standard to use to broadcast on UHF was in question at the time of the 1948 FCC freeze.

With the knowledge that UHF channel allocation would be necessary to expand television coverage, and with the knowledge that by 1949 VHF television was an entrenched standard, the FCC proposed intermixture, licensing both VHF and UHF stations in a single city. Intermixture would rely on consumers rapidly adopting television sets with UHF tuning capability, and on the base assumption that a UHF television station was functionally equivalent to a VHF one. To allocate four to as many as seven VHF channels to each of the largest cities would mean forcing the smaller, intervening cities completely onto UHF channels, while an allocation scheme that sought to assign one or two VHF channels in each smaller city would force VHF and UHF stations to compete in most markets. The largest cities with the most sets in use benefitted most from VHF allocations. For example, New York City, Washington-Baltimore, Los Angeles, and San Francisco received seven VHF stations apiece, and Chicago was allocated five, with the other two of those channels going to Milwaukee, Wisconsin and Rockford, Illinois.

FCC rules published on April 11, 1952, defined the final modern-day UHF allocation of 70 channels, 14 through 83, with 6 MHz bandwidth. It used standard NTSC standards. This would allow the license freeze enacted in 1949 to end. Through the entire three-and-a-half-year freeze period, KC2XAK remained the only UHF television station in regular operation.

=== End of the license freeze (1952) ===
When the FCC television license freeze ended in 1952, a huge backlog of potential stations applied, many allocated to the UHF band as defined by the 1952 rules. The first commercially licensed UHF television station was WWLP in Springfield, Massachusetts; however, the first commercial UHF television station on the air was KPTV, Channel 27, in Portland, Oregon, on September 18, 1952. Early in 1953, 35% of televisions sold contained a UHF tuner compliant with 1952 rules, lending hope to the idea that intermixture of UHF and VHF stations might succeed.

==== UHF reception issues ====
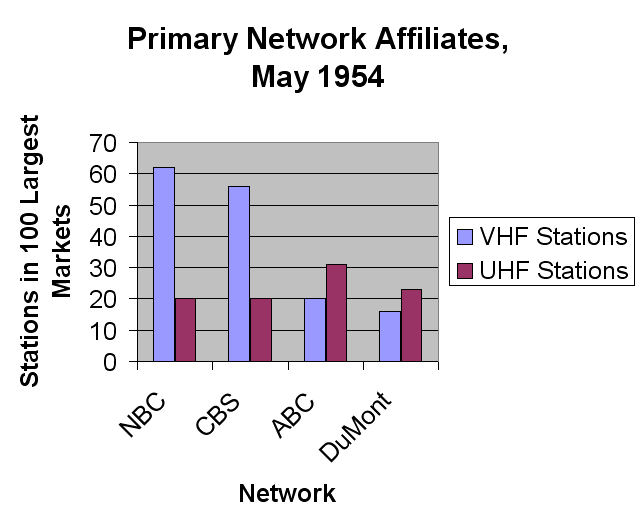

Several problems with early UHF tuners became evident. One was poor image frequency rejection in superheterodyne receivers with the standard intermediate frequency of 45.75 MHz. Another was very poor adjacent-channel rejection and channel selectivity by early tuner designs and manufactures. These problems were so significant that UHF-TV stations in the same geographic area were usually assigned a minimum of six channels apart from one another. Technical problems with the design of vacuum tubes for operation at high UHF frequencies were beginning to be addressed in 1954, but in the meantime, these shortcomings led to "UHF taboos", which in effect limited each metropolitan area to only moderately more UHF stations than VHF ones, despite the much higher number of channels.

Television sets in the United States were not mandated to include UHF tuners until 1964. With UHF's reputation for reception problems, the fraction of new TV receivers that were factory-equipped with all-channel tuners dropped from 35% in early 1953 to 9% by 1958, a drop that was only partially compensated for by field upgrades or the availability of external UHF converters for separate purchase. Plummeting inclusion of UHF tuners in sets placed VHF–UHF intermixture at grave risk of failure.

==== UHF transmission issues ====
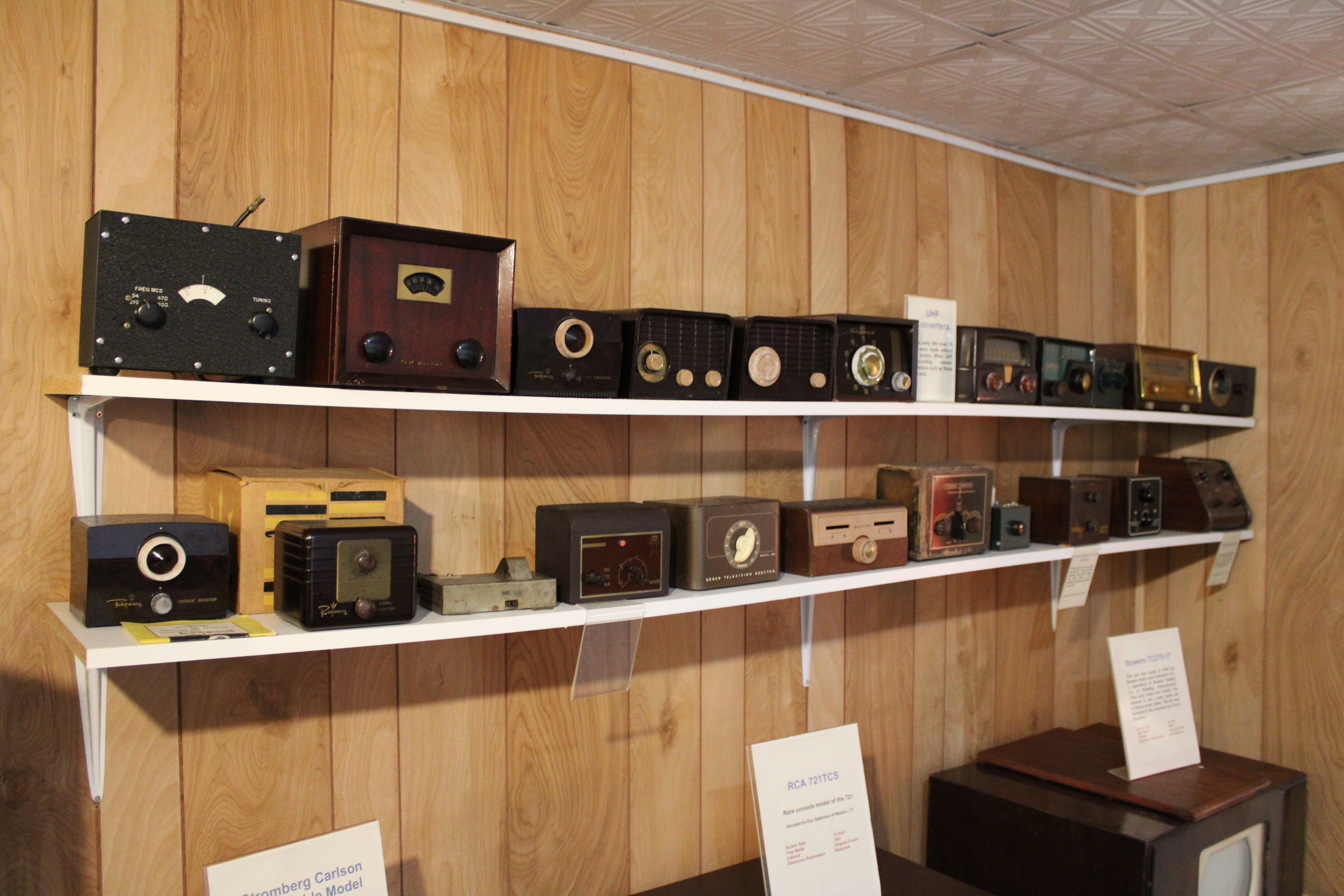
UHF converters on display at the Early Television Museum

On the transmission side, UHF stations were also found to have issues involving transmission distance and strength. The FCC tried solving this problem by allowing the lower-powered UHF stations to broadcast with more power, but VHF continued to have more stations. Advertisers soon caught on to this and did most of their business with VHF stations since UHF tuner adoption was flagging. While the more-established broadcasters were operating profitably on VHF channels as affiliates of the two largest TV networks (at the time, NBC and CBS), most of the original UHF local stations of the 1950s soon went bankrupt, limited by the range their signals could travel, the lack of UHF tuners in most TV sets and the paucity of advertisers willing to spend money on them. UHF stations fell quickly behind the VHF stations, losing $10,500,000 in 1953. More stations left the air than opened, and sixty percent of television industry losses from 1953 to 1956 came from UHF stations. TV network affiliations were difficult to get in many locations; the UHF stations with major-network affiliation would often lose these affiliations in favor of any viable new VHF TV station that entered the same market. Of the 82 new UHF-TV stations in the United States broadcasting as of June 1954, only 24 of them remained a year later.

The majority of the 165 UHF stations to begin telecasting between 1952 and 1959 did not survive. Not until the passage of the 1962 All-Channel Receiver Act did FCC regulations require all new TV sets sold in the U.S. to have built-in UHF tuners that could receive channels 14–83. Even though that requirement came into effect on April 30, 1964, there were only about 170 full-service UHF stations in operation in 1971.

=== Independent and educational stations ===
In the United States, UHF stations gained a reputation for local ownership, nonprofessional operations, small audiences and weak signal propagation.

While UHF-TV was available to American TV broadcasters in today's form since 1952, affiliates of the 1950s four largest American TV networks (NBC, CBS, ABC, and DuMont) preferentially transmitted on VHF wherever it was available. All available VHF-TV allocations were already in use in most large TV markets by the mid-1950s, owing to FCC spacing rules to avoid co-channel and adjacent channel interference between VHF TV stations in the same or nearby cities. Two VHF TV stations on the same channel needed to be 160 or more miles apart, and two VHF TV stations on adjacent channel frequencies needed to be 60 or more miles apart.

UHF stations in major population centers of the United States were usually either educational network or independent TV stations. The movie UHF (starring "Weird Al" Yankovic and Michael Richards) parodied the independent UHF station phenomenon; a fictional UHF station was also parodied in the 1980 film Pray TV. Some cities did develop successful independent UHF stations, many of these located in or near state capital cities, or served by nearby major rural regions. These included Montgomery, Alabama; Frankfort, Kentucky; Dover, Delaware; Lincoln, Nebraska; Topeka, Kansas; Jefferson City, Missouri; Lansing, Michigan; Harrisburg, Pennsylvania; Madison, Wisconsin; and Springfield, Illinois. In the United States, television stations in or near state capital cities are important because they closely covered the operations of state governments and spread information to residents across their state.

TV antenna manufacturers often rated their top-of-the-line "deep-fringe" antenna models with phrases like "100 miles VHF/60 miles UHF" if the antenna included UHF reception at all. (In the practice of electrical engineering, the frequency range in which an antenna is to be used is an important factor in its design.)

TV set manufacturers often treated UHF tuners as extra-charge optional-items until they became required. Various FCC attempts to protect UHF stations were met with mixed results.

- Limits on the number of owned-and-operated stations controlled by one corporation were raised from five stations to seven, provided that two of them were UHF stations. Both NBC-TV (WBUF 17 Buffalo, WNBC 30 Hartford) and CBS-TV (WHCT 18 Hartford, WXIX 19 Milwaukee) acquired pairs of UHF stations as an experiment in the mid-1950s, only to abandon the stations in 1958–9. (NBC has since reacquired channel 30 in Hartford, now WVIT.) Their commercial network programming soon returned to VHF channel affiliates. WBUF's facility on channel 17 was donated to start WNED-TV, a Public Broadcasting Service station. KPTV abandoned UHF for VHF channel 12 after merging its license and intellectual unit onto the channel 12 allocation with another broadcaster.
- The UHF television impact policy (1960–1988) allowed applications for new VHF TV stations to be opposed in cases where licensure could lead to the economic failure of an existing UHF TV broadcaster.
- The secondary affiliation rule (1971–1995) prohibited a network entering a market with two existing VHF TV network affiliates and one UHF independent TV station from placing its programs on a secondary basis on one or both VHF stations without offering them to the UHF station.
- Limits on UHF effective radiated power, originally very restrictive, were relaxed. A UHF TV station could be licensed for up to five megawatts of carrier power, unlike VHF TV stations, which were limited to 100 (Channels 2–6) or 316 kilowatts of carrier power (Channels 7–13) depending on their channel.
- More recent limits on station ownership are based on the combined percentage of the American population (originally 35% maximum, now increased to 45%) reached by one group of stations under common ownership. A UHF discount, by which only half of the audience of a UHF station would be counted against these limits, would ultimately allow groups such as PAX to reach the majority of the American audience using owned-and-operated UHF stations.

The situation began to improve in the 1960s and 1970s, but progress was slow and difficult.

While the smaller ABC-TV and DuMont Networks had a number of UHF affiliates, National Educational Television and its successor, PBS had even more.

The original SIN (Spanish International Network) was established in 1962 as the predecessor of the modern Univision network. It was built primarily by UHF stations, such as KWEX-DT, Channel 41 in San Antonio and KMEX-DT, Channel 34 in Los Angeles in 1962.

=== Fourth networks, satellite and cable television ===
In 1970, Ted Turner acquired a struggling independent station on Channel 17 in Atlanta, Georgia, purchasing reruns of popular television shows, the Atlanta Braves baseball team and the Atlanta Hawks basketball team.

This station, renamed WTBS, was uplinked in 1976 to satellite alongside new premium channels such as HBO, gaining access to distant cable television markets and becoming the first of various superstations to obtain national coverage. In 1986, Turner purchased the entire MGM film library. Turner Broadcasting System's access to movie rights proved commercially valuable as home video cassette rental became ubiquitous in the 1980s.

In 1986, the DuMont owned-and-operated station group Metromedia was acquired by News Corporation and used as the foundation to relaunch a fourth commercial network, which obtained affiliations with many former big-city independent stations as Fox TV.

Fox initially combined former independents and UHF stations. It had large programming budgets that the original DuMont lacked. Ultimately, it was able in some markets to draw existing VHF affiliates away from established Big Three networks, outbidding CBS for National Football Conference programming in 1994 and attracting many of that network's affiliates. Various smaller networks were created with the intent to follow in its footsteps, often by affiliating with a disparate collection of formerly independent UHF stations that otherwise would have no network programming.

By 1994, New World Communications was moving its established stations from CBS to Fox affiliations in multiple markets, including WJBK-TV 2 Detroit. In many cases, this pushed CBS onto UHF; "U-62" as the new home of CBS in Detroit became CBS owned-and-operated station WWJ-TV in 1995, obtaining access to audiences thousands of miles distant through satellite and cable television.

The concentration of media ownership, the proliferation of cable and satellite television and the digital television transition contributed to the quality equalization of VHF and UHF broadcasts. The distinction between UHF and VHF characteristics declined in importance with the emergence of additional broadcast television networks (Fox, The CW, MyNetworkTV, Univision, Telemundo, and UniMás), and the decline of direct OTA reception. The number of major large-city independent stations also declined as many joined or formed new networks.

=== Digital television ===
The majority of digital TV stations currently broadcast in the UHF band, both because VHF was already filled largely with analog TV when the digital facilities were built and because of severe issues with impulse noise on digital low-VHF channels. While virtual channel numbering schemes routinely display channel numbers like "2.1" or "6.1" for individual North American terrestrial HDTV broadcasts, these are more often than not actually UHF signals. Many equipment vendors therefore use "HDTV antenna" or similar branding as all but synonymous to "UHF antenna".

Terrestrial digital television is based on a forward error correction scheme, in which a channel is assumed to have a random bit error rate and additional data bits may be sent to allow these errors to be corrected at the receiver. While this error correction can work well in the UHF band where the interference consist largely of white noise, it has largely proven inadequate on lower VHF channels where bursts of impulse noise disrupt the entire channel for short lengths of time. A short impulse-noise burst might be a minor annoyance to analog TV viewers, but due to the fixed timing and repetitive nature of analog video synchronization is usually recoverable. The same interference can prove severe enough to prevent the reliable reception of the more fragile and more highly compressed ATSC digital television. Power limits are also lower on low-VHF; a digital UHF station may be licensed to transmit up to a megawatt of effective radiated power. Very few stations returned to VHF channels 2–6 after the transition was completed in 2009, and were mainly concentrated in the Desert Southwest and Mountain West regions, where few geographical obstructions and adjoining co-channel stations exist. At least three quarters of all full-power digital broadcasts continued to use UHF transmitters, with most of the others located on the high-VHF channels. In some American markets, such as Syracuse, New York, no full-service VHF TV stations remained.

The one remaining limitation of UHF is its greatly reduced range in the presence of terrain obstacles. This continues to adversely affect digital UHF TV reception. This limitation could potentially be overcome by the use of a distributed transmission system. Multiple digital UHF transmitters in carefully selected locations can be synchronized as a single-frequency network to produce a tailored coverage area pattern rivaling that of a single full-power VHF transmitter.

Due to the inferiority of UHF broadcasting for analog television, the FCC counts the audience of UHF stations by half for the purposes of its national market share cap of 39%, a policy known as the UHF discount. The rule was briefly removed in September 2016, with the FCC citing that the rule was obsolete because almost all digital television channels are on the UHF band, and that the policy was being abused by broadcasters as a loophole to increase their market share. However, in April 2017, under new FCC commissioner Ajit Pai, the discount was reinstated.

=== UHF islands ===
One notable exception to historical patterns favoring VHF broadcasters has existed in television markets that could not qualify for their own VHF stations because they were sandwiched between the outer fringes of VHF stations in two or more larger markets. Such cities received only UHF licenses.

With all stations (including network affiliates) on UHF, all-channel receivers and antennas became commonplace locally and UHF stations signing on as early as 1953 were often able to obtain the programming and audience needed to remain viable into the modern era.

These communities, known as UHF islands, included cities like Youngstown, Ohio; Tri-Cities, Washington; Springfield, Massachusetts; Elmira, New York; South Bend, Indiana; Fort Wayne, Indiana; Peoria, Illinois; Huntsville, Alabama; Salisbury, Maryland; Lexington, Kentucky; and Scranton, Pennsylvania. Other smaller cities such as Madison, Wisconsin; Bakersfield, California; Fresno, California; Fort Myers, Florida; Mankato, Minnesota; Watertown, New York; Erie, Pennsylvania; Columbia, South Carolina; and Harrisburg, Pennsylvania only received one VHF license, meaning that any additional programming would need to be provided either by UHF, by distant stations, or by low-power broadcasting. The Bakersfield and Fresno markets originally had stations that operated on a VHF channel (KERO-TV on channel 10 and KFRE-TV on channel 12); those markets became UHF islands between 1961 and 1963 after the FCC initiated a deintermixture process, with KERO-TV moving to channel 23 and KFRE-TV moving to channel 30. The allocations of the two channels that were vacated were reassigned to nearby markets; channel 10 would be reallocated to the Las Vegas, Nevada market as a fifth VHF channel (which would be used by KLVX when it signed on in 1968), while channel 12 would be reallocated to the Santa Barbara, California market as a third VHF channel (which would be used by KCOY-TV when it signed on in 1964). The Peoria market was also affected by the deintermixture process as WIRL-TV, which was originally assigned a construction permit for channel 8 in 1956, had its VHF allocation reassigned to the Davenport, Iowa–Moline, Illinois market before it could sign on; this enabled WQAD-TV to begin operations in 1963.

=== Broadcast translators and low-power television ===
Very small UHF TV transmitters continue to operate with no programming or commercial identity, instead retransmitting signals of existing full-power stations to a smaller area poorly covered by the main VHF signal. Such transmitters are called "translators" rather than "stations". The smallest, owned by local municipal-level groups or the originating TV stations, are numbered sequentially – W or K, followed by the channel number, followed by two sequentially issued letters, yielding a "translator callsign" in a generic format that appears K14AA through W69ZZ. Translators and repeaters also exist on VHF channels, but infrequently and with stringently limited power.

The translator band, UHF TV channels 70–83, consisted mostly of these small repeaters; it was removed from television use in 1983 with the tiny repeaters moved primarily to lower UHF channels. The 806–890 MHz band segment is now used primarily by mobile phones. Many of these transmitters, if still in operation, were moved again in 2011 as UHF channels 52–69 were lost primarily to mobile telephones during the DTV transition, and a third time by 2020, when the 2016 wireless spectrum auction eliminated channels 38–51.

As improvements to originating stations lessen the need for these translators, the small transmitter facilities and their allocated frequencies were often repurposed for low-power broadcasting; instead of repeating a distant signal, the tiny transmitter would be used to originate programming for a small local area.

== See also ==
- All-Channel Receiver Act
- Television channel frequencies
