= Cambridge Cable =

Former British telecommunications company

Cambridge Cable Ltd.
- Company type: Private
- Industry: Telecommunications
- Founded: Cambridge, UK (20 May 1988)
- Fate: Acquired
- Successor: NTL
- Headquarters: Cambridge, UK
- Area served: Cambridge, South Cambridgeshire, East Cambridgeshire, Huntingdonshire, Forest Heath, Uttlesford, North Hertfordshire
- Services: Digital television

Cambridge Cable Ltd. was a limited company engaged in the provision of early video on demand. It provided cable infrastructure in the UK as part of the Cambridge Digital Interactive Television Trial (Cambridge iTV trial/Cambridge Cable Project).

== History ==
It was founded in 1988 by three Cambridge businessmen as a cable television and communications company. In June 1989, the company was awarded the cable television franchise for the city of Cambridge and the surrounding area, and in July 1990 was granted licence by the DTI to operate a public telecommunications service and distribute television channels via its underground cable network.

Cambridge Cable's inaugural service commenced in July 1991 with a cable television service; the company's public telephone service launched in September 1992.

The company gained financial and operational backing from Comcast Corporation, a major cable television network operator in the United States, and Singapore Telecom, the public telecommunications operator in Singapore. By 1996, it was fully owned by Comcast.

With its backing from Comcast, purchased Stort Valley Cable Limited and was awarded the franchise for Harlow, Bishop's Stortford and Sawbridgeworth in November 1992, its services were provided under the name of Anglia Cable Communications.

Late 1993 saw services started in the company's East Coast Cable franchise with subscribers in Colchester added first; network build throughout Colchester, then Ipswich and, later, Felixstowe followed.

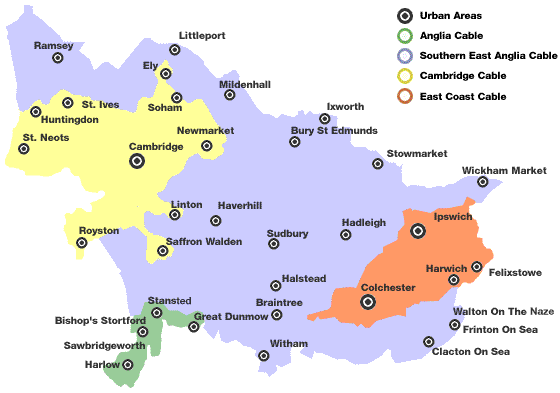
Franchise map (dated 1997)

On 2 June 1999, the Cambridge Cable Group, as it by then had become known, became part of NTL's growing portfolio, having operated franchises under the names Cambridge Cable, Anglia Cable, East Coast Cable and Southern East Anglia Cable.

The company and its network is now part of Virgin Media.

== See also ==
- Acorn Online Media Set Top Box
