= Maghera transmission site =

Transmitter on mountain in Ireland

Maghera
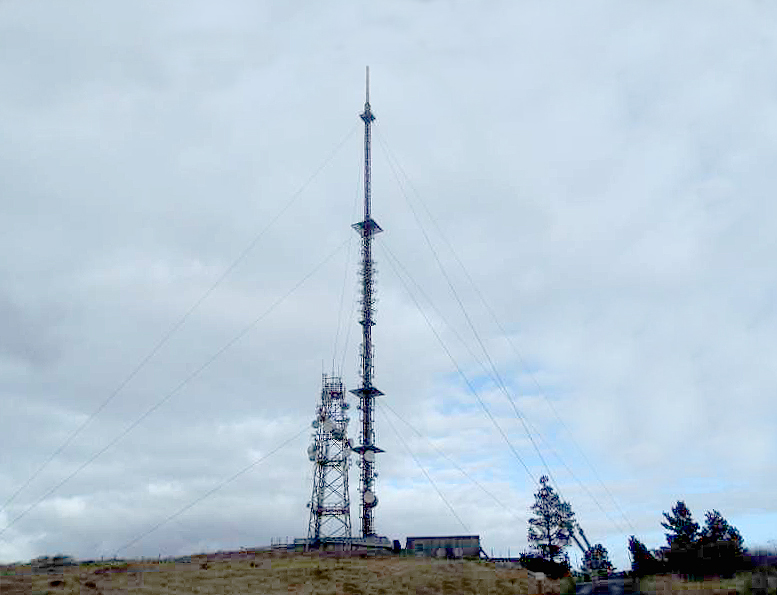
- 2RN site on Maghera

- Maghera in Ireland
- Location: Killanena, County Clare
- Mast height: 160 metres (525 ft)
- Coordinates: 52°58′07″N 8°43′06″W
- Built: 1962

The Maghera transmission site is situated on a 400 metre (1000 foot) hill (Irish: Cnoc an Ois) located at Killanena in the east of County Clare, Ireland. It is home to one of 2RN's network of radio and television transmitters.

== History ==
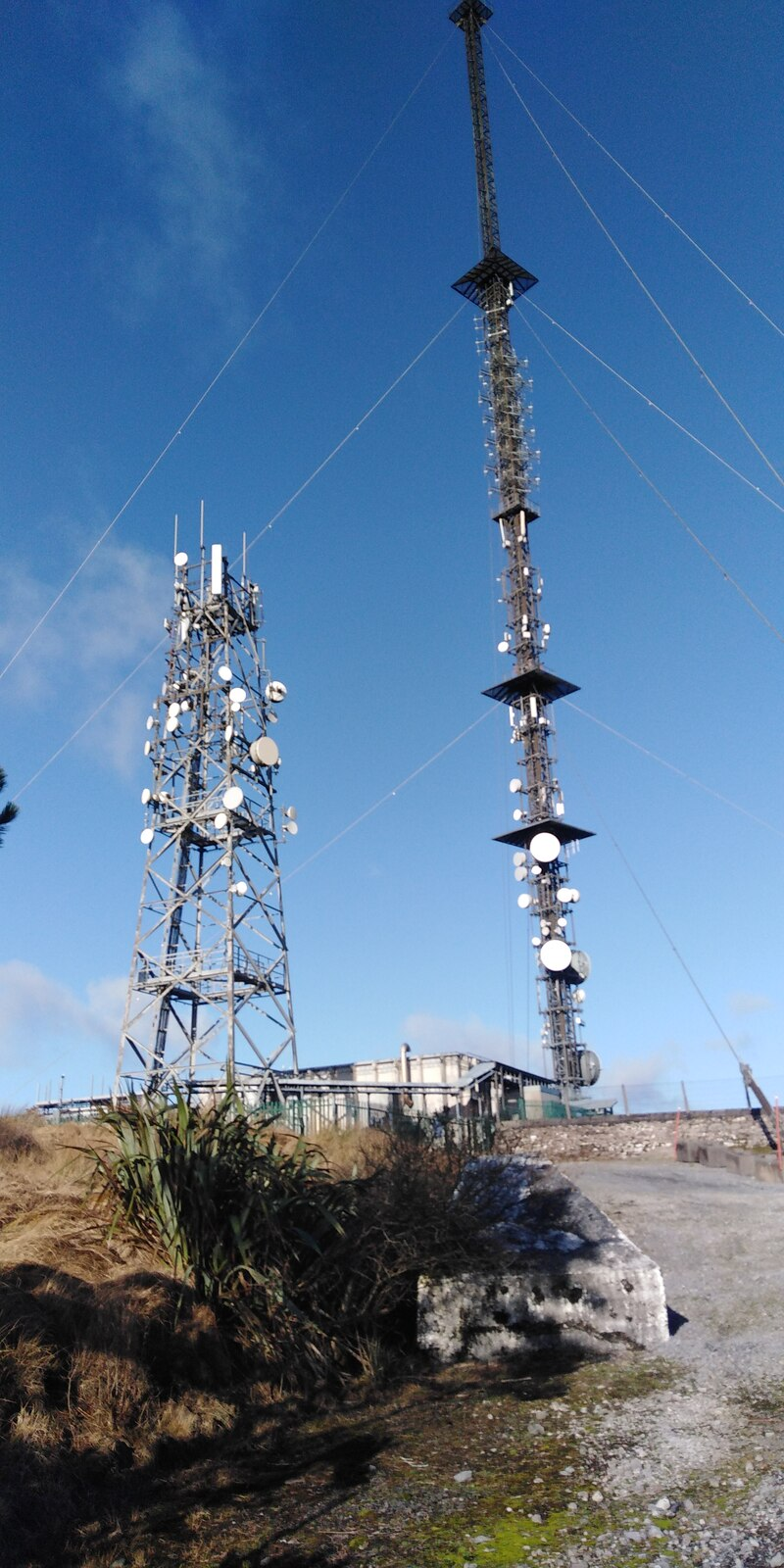
The links tower and transmitter mast

The Maghera television transmitter first went on air in February 1963 on low power before becoming fully operational on 10 September 1963. It was one of Telefís Éireann's original five main transmitters, the others being Mullaghanish, Kippure, Truskmore and Mount Leinster. The transmitter originally carried the 625 line television service on VHF Channel B (Band I). A simulcast on Channel E (Band III) was added in 1993, with UHF channels being added in 1996 (TG4) and 1999 (TV3). When it was operating on Channel B certain atmospheric conditions during the summer months could cause interference from a transmitter on similar frequencies in Spain, this resulted in viewers in the south west of Ireland occasionally seeing bullfights on their television. Transmissions on channel B ceased in 1999. In 1966 the new RTÉ Radio FM service started broadcasting from the site with more FM radio stations added over the years.

The original 147.5 metre (484 foot) mast that was erected in 1962 was replaced in 2011 with a 160 metres (525 feet) tall cable-stayed steel lattice mast that would enhance its service area for the start of digital terrestrial television (DTT) broadcasting. All analogue television transmissions from the site ended on 24 October 2012, and since then the Irish digital television service Saorview, has been broadcast from the site in addition to six national FM radio networks and a number of local radio services. Maghera's service area is the West of Ireland, covering counties Clare and Galway, as well as parts of counties Limerick, Kerry, Cork, Tipperary and Mayo.

== Current Transmissions ==
=== Digital television ===
Frequency	UHF	ERP	Multiplex	Pol
690 MHz	48	160 kw	Saorview 1	H
674 MHz	46	160 kw	Saorview 2	H

=== FM radio ===
Frequency	ERP	Service	Notes
88.8 MHz	160 kw	RTÉ Radio 1	Since 1985. Shared RnaG frequency 1972-85
91.0 MHz	160 kw	RTÉ 2fm	94.1 MHz Before 1985
98.4 MHz	160 kw	RTÉ lyric fm	Since 1999
93.2 MHz	160 kw	RTÉ Raidió na Gaeltachta	97.0 MHz Before 1985 (Mono only before 1982)
96.4 MHz	5 kw	Clare FM	Since 1989
100.6 MHz	160 kw	Today FM	Since 1997 (was Century Radio 1989-91)
102.1Mhz	5 Kw	iRadio	Since 2026 (Was previously Derrybrien)
102.7 MHz	20 kw	Spin South West	Since 2007
104.6 MHz	50 kw	Ireland's Classic Hits Radio	Since 2009
107.6 MHz	20 kw	Newstalk	Since 2006 (Mono Only)

=== Maghera Relay transmitters ===
DTT Relay	County	Mux 1	Mux 2	ERP	Pol
Achill	Mayo	47	44	2 kw	V
Ballina	Tipperary	23	26	0.1 kw	V
Casla	Galway	45	41	2.5 kw	V
Clifden	Galway	26	23	5 kw	V
Cnoc an Óir	Kerry	47	44	1.5 kw	V
Ennistimon	Clare	33	36	0.02 kw	H
Tonabrocky	Galway	26	23	0.25 kw	V
