= Colin Crowell =

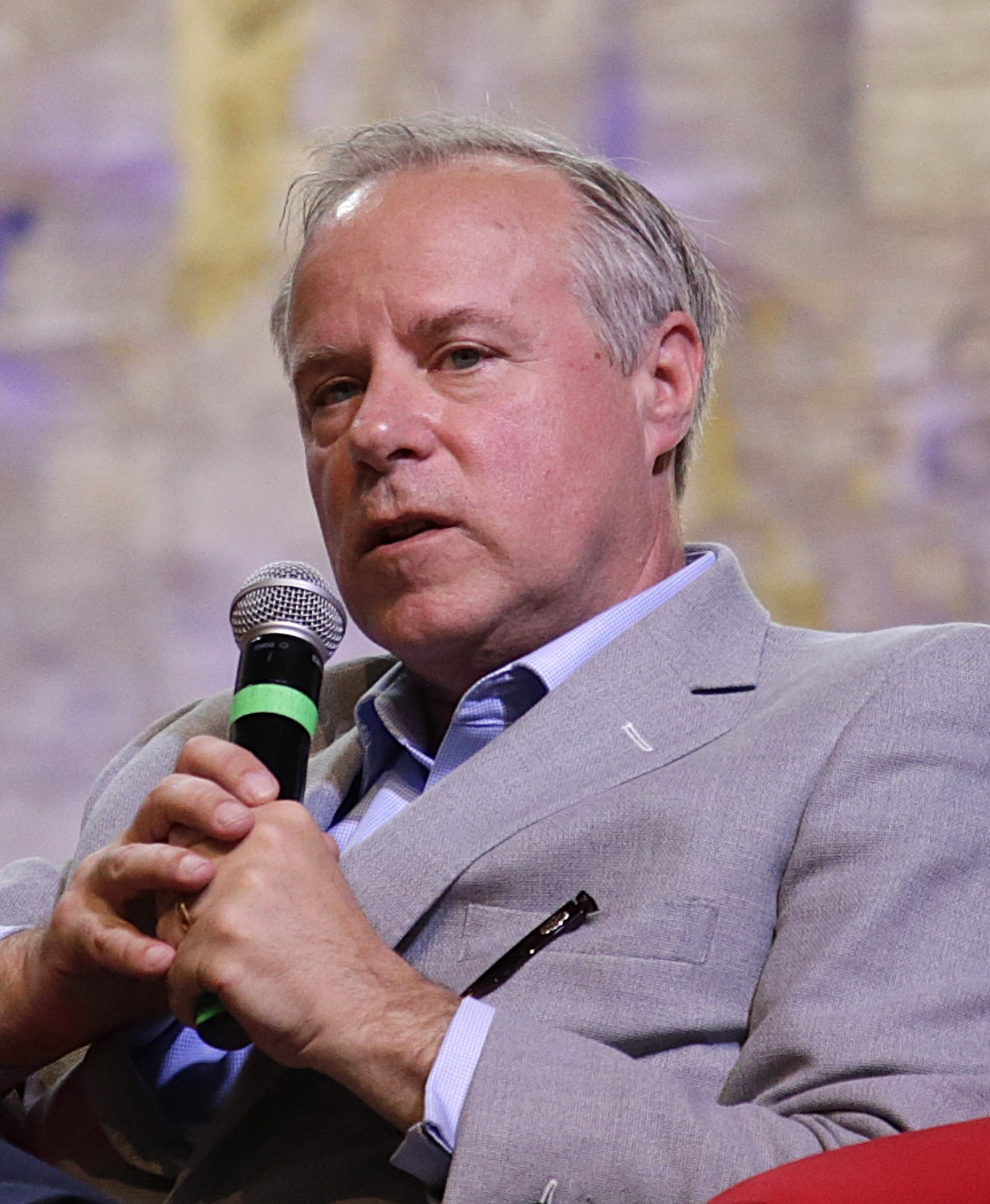
- Crowell at the 2026 International Journalism Festival.

Personal details
- Born: Colin Crowell; 1965 (age 60–61)
- Spouse: Carrie Wofford
- Education: Boston College (A.B.)

Colin Crowell (born 1965) is an American public policy expert active the telecommunications and Internet sector. He is currently the head of the Blue Owl Group. Crowell is the former Vice President of Global Public Policy and Philanthropy at Twitter, where he was the company's first public policy hire. Crowell was initially brought on board to build out this function globally for Twitter.

Prior to Twitter, Crowell worked for over two decades for then-Congressman Ed Markey, a former chair of the House Committee on Energy and Commerce's Subcommittee on Telecommunications and the Internet. From 2009 to 2010, Crowell served as Senior Counselor to Julius Genachowski, the Chairman of the U.S. Federal Communications Commission (FCC).

== Education ==
Crowell graduated from Boston College in 1986 with a B.A. in political science and a minor in computer science. He also served as a Jesuit International Volunteer upon graduation, teaching at a Jesuit school, Colegio San José, Arequipa, Peru, and working at a community soup kitchen.

Crowell was the 2020 Commencement Speaker, at the LBJ School of Public Affairs at the University of Texas at Austin on the occasion of the LBJ School’s 50th Anniversary.

== Career ==
Crowell was a key participant in drafting the Telecommunications Act of 1996, a landmark law that established key elements of the foundational framework for Internet policy in the U.S., including Section 230 and the E-rate provision. He is also considered to be "a major architect of the FCC's national broadband plan." In lawmaking, he was considered "a leading figure in… developing compromise," and an advocate for consumers and the public interest.

Crowell speaks widely on high technology policy. Among other speaking engagements, Crowell has presented at the Oslo Freedom Forum, appeared on the Roda Viva television show in Brazil, and joined the "AMDG: A Jesuit Podcast" for a discussion on how his Jesuit education influenced his approach to social media.

== Personal life and recognition ==
Crowell has been profiled in The Washington Post, and has been quoted widely regarding technology and telecommunications policy. He has been called "one of the most influential tech policy operatives you've never heard of" whose "fingerprints are all over some of the biggest technology and telecommunications statutes of the last two decades"; "an influential expert in the politics and policy of technology"; "a walking encyclopedia on the arcane details of tech and telecom statutes"; with “an unrivaled understanding of telecommunications law and history” and knowledge of "telecommunications and Congress unrivaled in Washington."

FCC Chairman Genachowski said: "No government staffer has done more to positively shape federal telecommunications policy over the past 25 years." Genachowski called Crowell "indispensable to every key decision we've made," possessing a "rare combination of policy smarts, wise counsel, and communications expertise."

Crowell is married to Carrie Wofford, the niece of former Senator Harris Wofford.
