= Holywell Hill transmission site =

Transmission site in Ireland

Holywell Hill
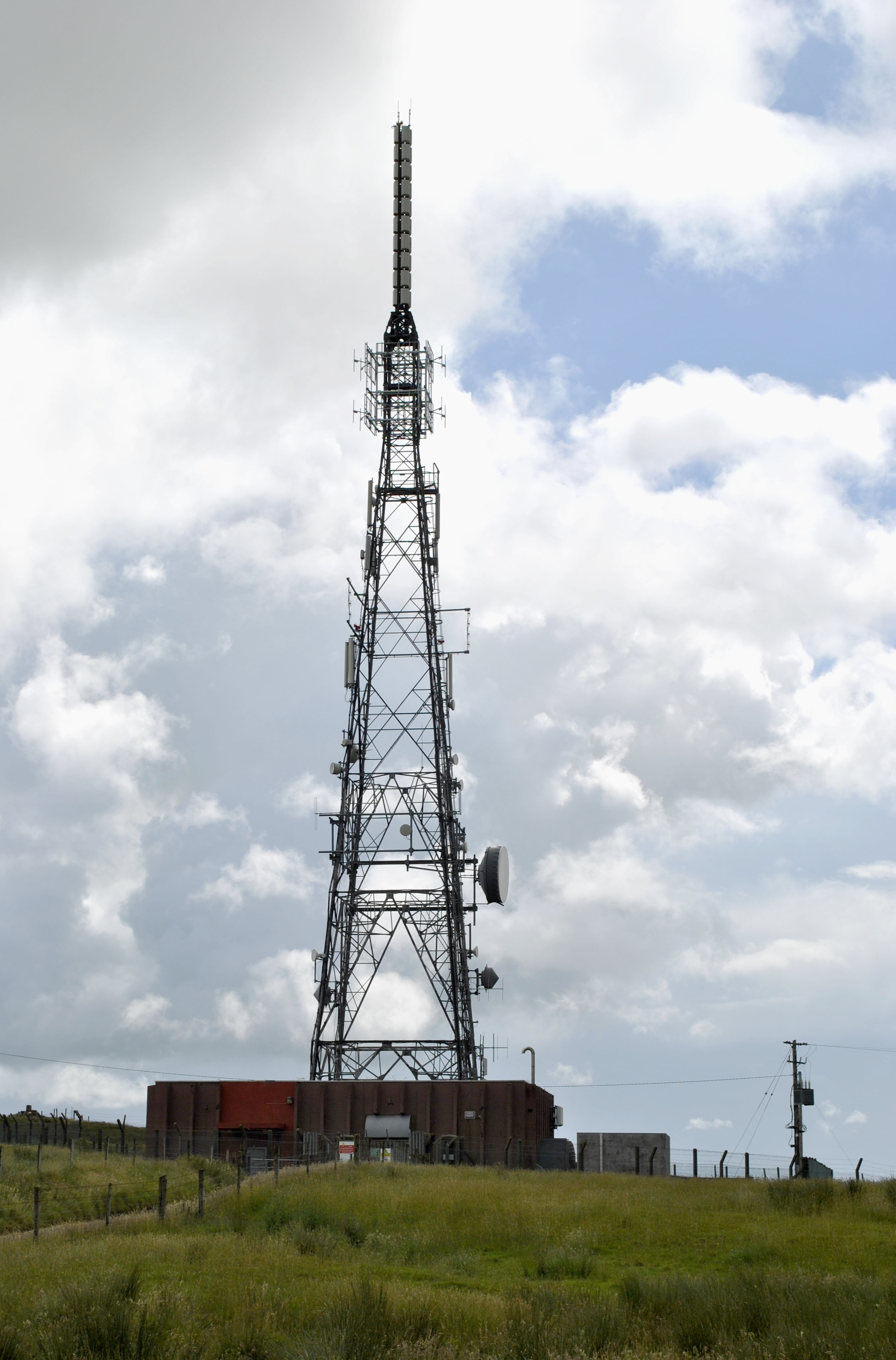

- Holywell Hill in Ireland
- Location: Killea, County Donegal
- Mast height: 60 metres (197 ft)
- Coordinates: 54°59′56″N 7°23′59″W
- Built: 1981

The Holywell Hill transmission site is located on a 260-metre (853') hill near Killea in County Donegal, Ireland, and is owned and operated by 2RN (formerly RTÉ NL).

== History ==
The site which is close to the border with Northern Ireland has a 60-metre (200') self-supporting tower and was opened in 1981 to provide UHF television coverage to parts of County Donegal as well as Derry City and County. It originally carried the two Irish analogue channels, RTÉ One (Ch 23), and RTÉ Two (Ch 26), in later years, both TV3 (Ch 29), and TG4 (Ch 33) were added, all were horizontally polarised and with an effective radiated power (ERP) of 20 kW. Digital terrestrial television (DTT) was first broadcast from the site in 2008 in preparation for the national switchover to digital television on 24 October 2012.

Today the Irish digital television service Saorview, and five national radio stations on FM, are broadcast from the Holywell Hill site to a large area of North West Ireland including Derry city. The transmitter also services a number of relay transmitters in County Donegal to help improve coverage in the difficult terrain.

== Current transmissions ==
=== Digital television ===
Frequency	UHF	ERP	Multiplex	Pol
482 MHz	22	20 kW	Saorview 1	H
506 MHz	25	20 kW	Saorview 2	H

=== FM radio ===
Frequency	ERP	Service
89.2 MHz	6 kW	RTÉ Radio 1
91.4 MHz	6 kW	RTÉ 2fm
93.6 MHz	6 kW	RTÉ Raidió na Gaeltachta
98.8 MHz	6 kW	RTÉ lyric fm
101.0 MHz	6 kW	Today FM

=== Holywell Hill relay transmitters ===
DTT Relay	County	Mux 1	Mux 2	ERP	Pol
Ballybofey	Donegal	47	44	0.1 kW	V
Clonmany	Donegal	39	42	0.02 kW	V
Fanad	Donegal	43	46	1.5 kW	V
Letterkenny	Donegal	39	42	2 kW	V
Magheraroarty	Donegal	22	27	0.5 kW	V
Malin	Donegal	28	26	2 kW	H
Moville	Donegal	32	34	2 kW	H

== Gallery ==
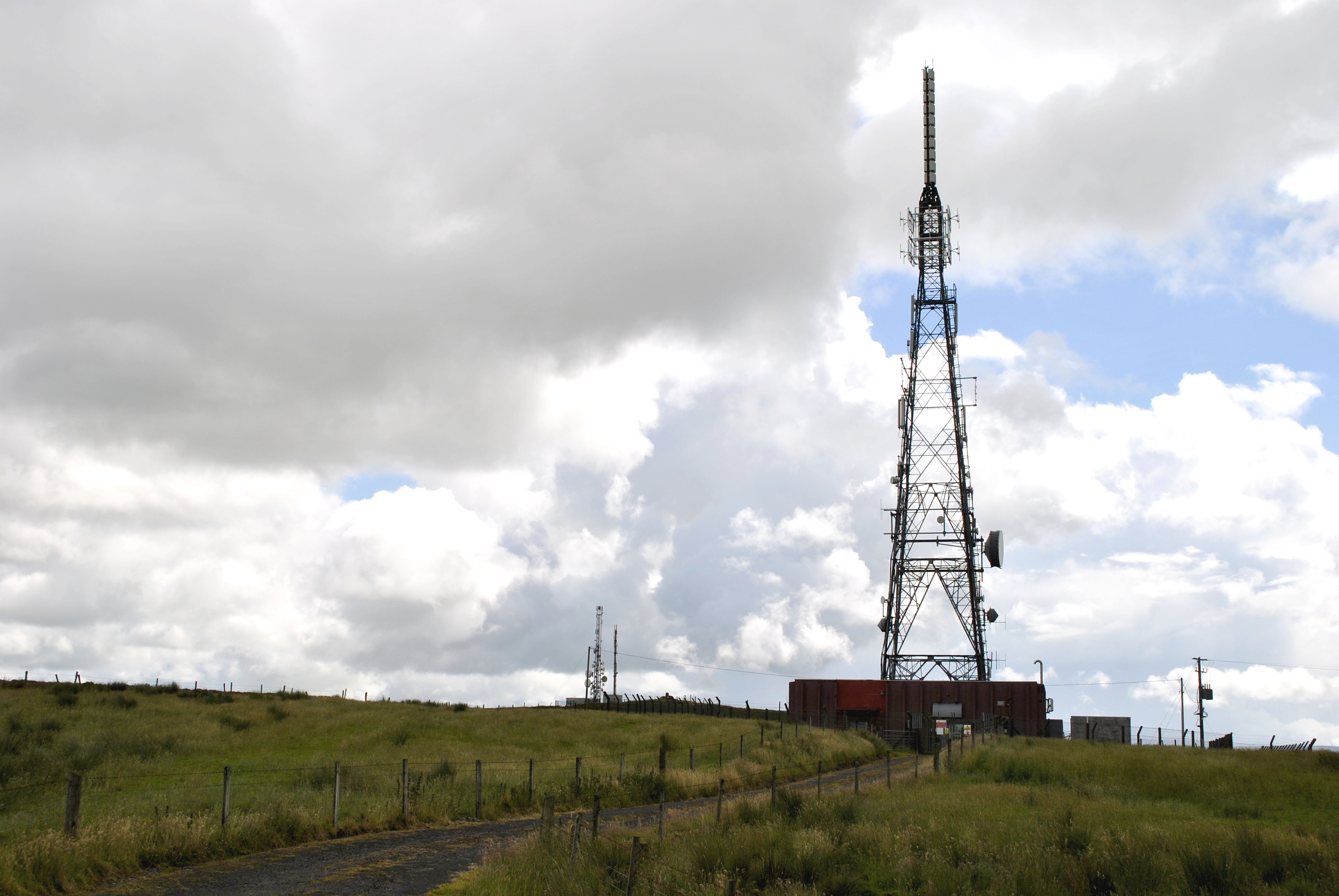
The approach road to the site

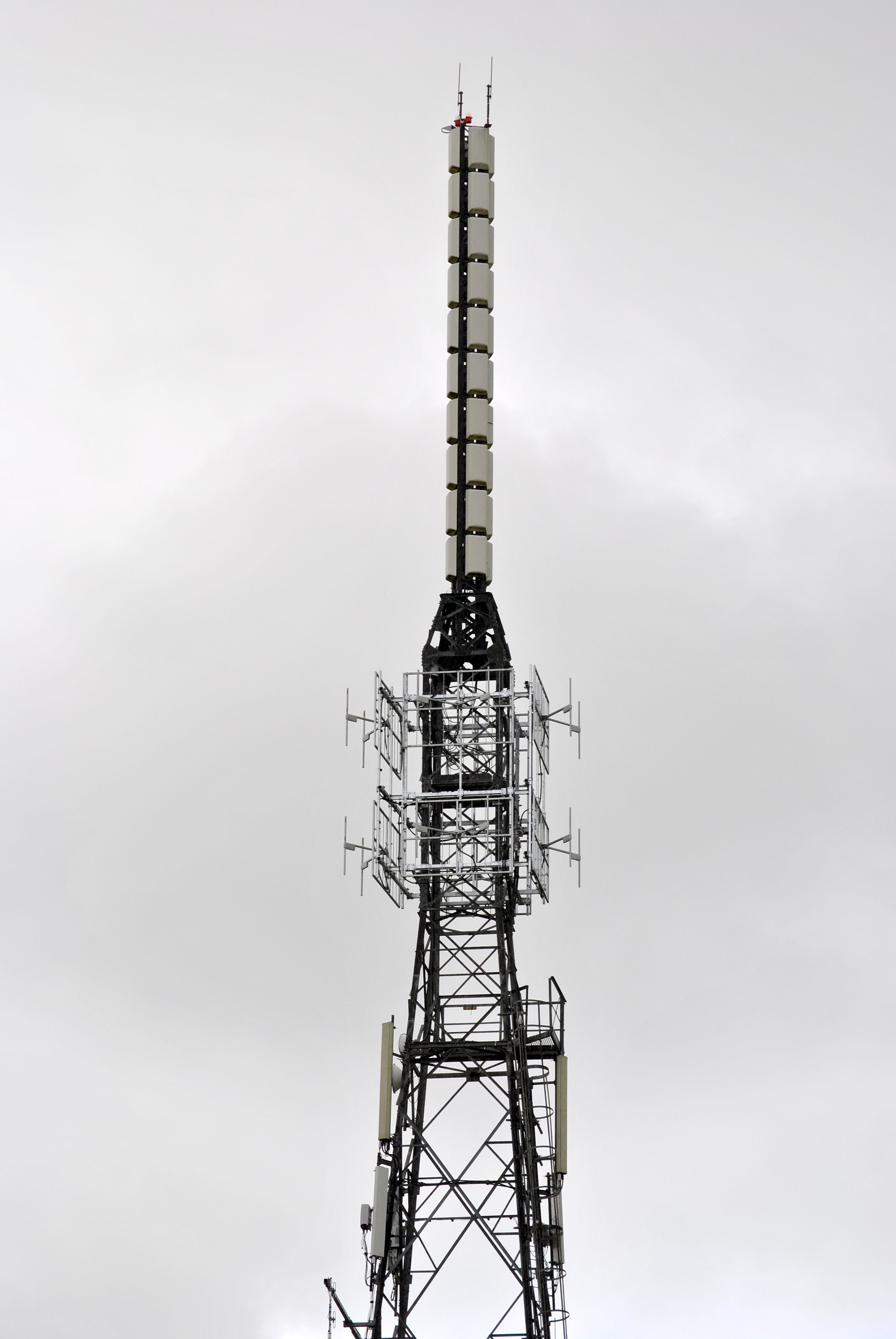
Top of the transmitter mast

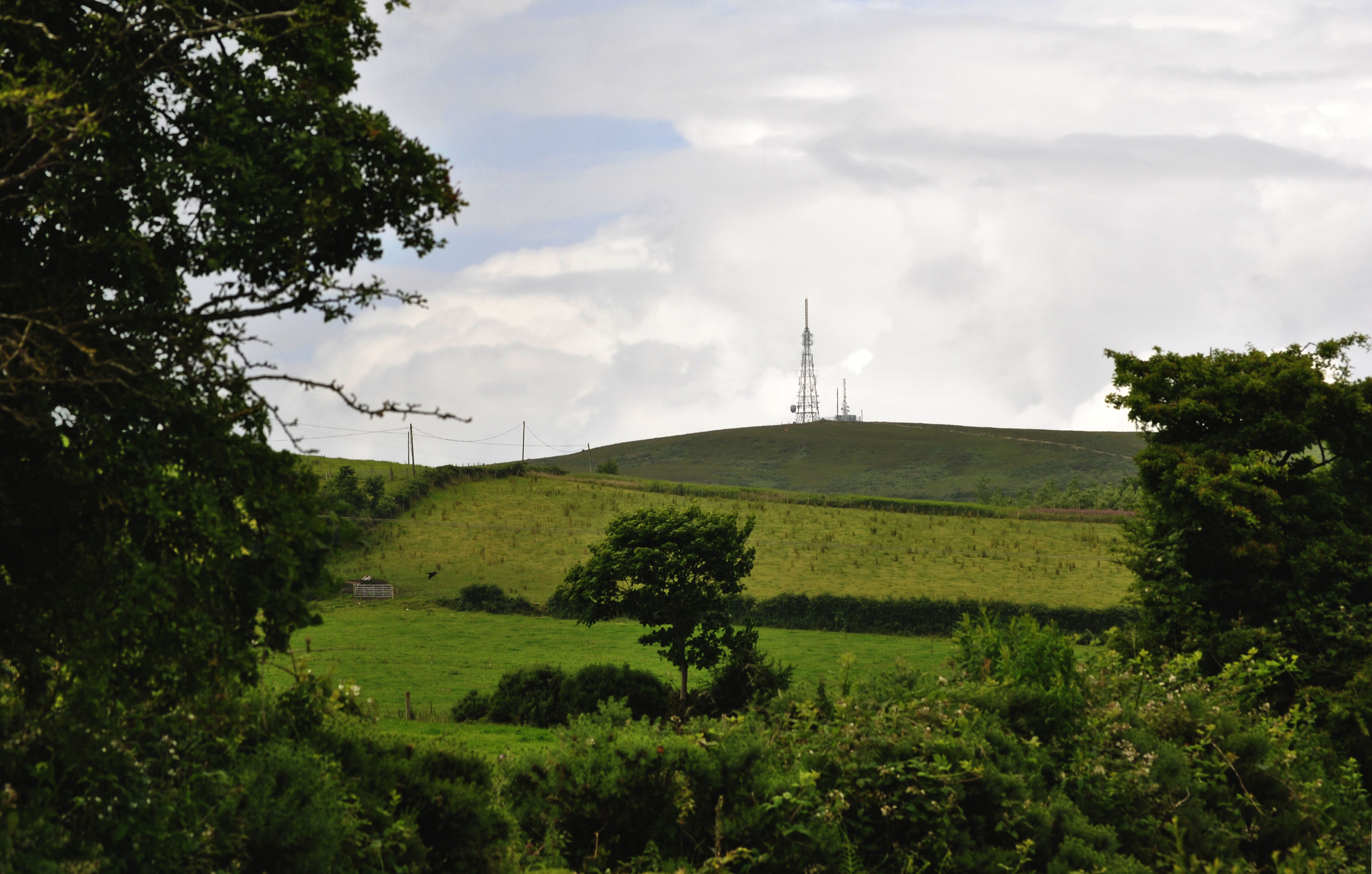
Holywell Hill seen from Heather Road in Derry
