= Sezmi =

Defunct cloud-based video delivery platform

Sezmi www.sezmi.com
- Your shows. Your schedule. Your price
- Company type: Private VC-backed startup
- Industry: P2P/TV
- Genre: Net TV
- Founded: 2007
- Founder: Buno Pati and Phil Wiser
- Defunct: 2012
- Headquarters: Belmont, California, USA
- Products: Set-top DVR
- Services: Video content delivery
- Website: www.sezmi.com

Sezmi was a cloud based video delivery platform for television providers to deliver services over several IP devices like tablet and mobile computing devices.

Sezmi, originally named Building B, was founded by Phil Wiser and Buno Pati in 2007 and based in Belmont, California.

Previously, Sezmi was a subscription video service in 36 metropolitan areas of the United States. It provided a DVR which recorded free over-the-air broadcasts plus brought in video from Internet sources. The system used a smart antenna to improve reception in fringe areas. On September 23, 2011, Sezmi informed customers that they would be discontinuing their service on September 26, 2011.

Sezmi was acquired by KIT Digital in January 2012 for $27 million, $16 million in cash and $11 million in KIT Digital stock. The acquisition included 18 patents from Sezmi related to OTT platforms.

Later in 2012, Totalmovie acquired Sezmi from Kit Digital.

== Service areas ==
The 36 metro areas in which Sezmi previously served:

- Albuquerque-Santa Fe, New Mexico
- Atlanta, Georgia
- Boston, Massachusetts
- Charlotte, North Carolina
- Cleveland-Akron, Ohio
- Columbus, Ohio
- Dallas–Fort Worth, Texas
- Detroit, Michigan
- Grand Rapids, Michigan
- Greensboro-Winston Salem, North Carolina
- Greenville-Spartanburg, South Carolina
- Hartford-New Haven, Connecticut
- Houston, Texas
- Jacksonville, Florida
- Kansas City, Missouri
- Los Angeles, California
- Memphis, Tennessee
- Miami-Fort Lauderdale, Florida
- Milwaukee, Wisconsin
- Minneapolis–Saint Paul, Minnesota
- Nashville, Tennessee
- Norfolk-Virginia Beach, Virginia
- Oklahoma City, Oklahoma
- Orlando-Daytona Beach, Florida
- Philadelphia, Pennsylvania
- Phoenix, Arizona
- Portland, Oregon
- Raleigh-Durham, North Carolina
- Salt Lake City, Utah
- San Antonio, Texas
- San Diego, California
- San Francisco-Oakland-San Jose, California
- Seattle-Tacoma, Washington
- St. Louis, Missouri
- Washington, D.C.
- West Palm Beach, Florida
