= 2021 in American television =

In American television in 2021, notable events include television show debuts, finales, and cancellations; channel launches, closures, and re-brandings; stations changing or adding their network affiliations; and information about controversies and carriage disputes.

== Awards ==
Category/Organization	79th Golden Globe Awards January 9, 2022	12th Critics' Choice Television Awards March 7, 2022	Producers Guild and Screen Actors Guild Awards February 27–March 19, 2022	74th Primetime Emmy Awards September 12, 2022
Best Drama Series	Succession			
Best Comedy Series	Hacks	Ted Lasso		
Best Limited Series	The Underground Railroad	Mare of Easttown		The White Lotus
Best Actor in a Drama Series	Jeremy Strong; Succession	Lee Jung-jae; Squid Game		
Best Actress in a Drama Series	Michaela Jaé Rodriguez; Pose	Melanie Lynskey; Yellowjackets	Jung Ho-Yeon; Squid Game	Zendaya; Euphoria
Best Supporting Actor in a Drama Series	O Yeong-su; Squid Game	Kieran Culkin; Succession	—N/a	Matthew Macfadyen; Succession
Best Supporting Actress in a Drama Series	Sarah Snook; Succession		—N/a	Julia Garner; Ozark
Best Actor in a Comedy Series	Jason Sudeikis; Ted Lasso			
Best Actress in a Comedy Series	Jean Smart; Hacks			
Best Supporting Actor in a Comedy Series	—N/a	Brett Goldstein; Ted Lasso	—N/a	Brett Goldstein; Ted Lasso
Best Supporting Actress in a Comedy Series	—N/a	Hannah Waddingham; Ted Lasso	—N/a	Sheryl Lee Ralph; Abbott Elementary
Best Actor in a Limited Series	Michael Keaton; Dopesick			
Best Actress in a Limited Series	Kate Winslet; Mare of Easttown			Amanda Seyfried; The Dropout
Best Supporting Actor in a Limited Series	—N/a	Murray Bartlett; The White Lotus	—N/a	Murray Bartlett; The White Lotus
Best Supporting Actress in a Limited Series	—N/a	Jennifer Coolidge; The White Lotus	—N/a	Jennifer Coolidge; The White Lotus

== Television shows ==
=== Shows changing networks ===
Show	Moved from	Moved to	Source
Stargirl	DC Universe/The CW	The CW	
Doom Patrol	DC Universe/HBO Max	HBO Max	
Titans	DC Universe	HBO Max	
Young Justice	DC Universe	HBO Max	
The Other Two	Comedy Central	HBO Max	
Scooby-Doo and Guess Who?	Boomerang	HBO Max	
Gen:Lock	Rooster Teeth	HBO Max	
Thomas Edison Secret Lab	Qubo	Peacock	
The DaVincibles	Qubo	Kabillion	
Dr. Pimple Popper: This Is Zit	TLC.com	Discovery+	
Crikey! It's the Irwins	Animal Planet	Discovery+	
See No Evil	Investigation Discovery	Discovery+	
Evil Lives Here	Investigation Discovery	Discovery+	
Murder in the Heartland	Investigation Discovery	Discovery+	
Archibald's Next Big Thing	Netflix	Peacock	
DreamWorks Dragons: Rescue Riders	Netflix	Peacock	
American Ninja Warrior Junior	Universal Kids	Peacock	
Home Sweet Home	NBC	Peacock	
Miss America	NBC	Peacock	
Younger	TV Land	Paramount+	
RuPaul's Drag Race All Stars	VH1	Paramount+	
Inside the NFL	Showtime	Paramount+	
Evil	CBS	Paramount+	
SEAL Team	CBS	Paramount+	
Reno 911!	Quibi	The Roku Channel/Paramount+	
Punk'd	Quibi	The Roku Channel	
Dishmantled	Quibi	The Roku Channel	
The Rich and the Ruthless	Allblk	BET+	
The Last Cowboy	Paramount Network	CMT	
It's Pony	Nickelodeon	Nicktoons	

=== Milestone episodes and anniversaries ===
Show	Network	Episode #	Episode title	Episode airdate	Source
Ridiculousness	MTV	600th episode	"Chanel and Sterling CCLIII"	January 7	
Teen Titans Go!	Cartoon Network	300th episode	"Lucky Stars"	January 23	
Saturday Night Live	NBC	900th episode	"Dan Levy/Phoebe Bridgers"	February 6	
Let's Make a Deal	CBS	2,000th episode	"Episode 2000"	February 19	
American Housewife	ABC	100th episode	"Getting Frank with the Ottos"	February 24	
The Simpsons	Fox	700th episode	"Manger Things"	March 21	
Ridiculousness	MTV	650th episode	"Chanel and Sterling CCXCII"	April 9	
Bunk'd	Disney Channel	100th episode	"Gi Whiz"	June 3	
The Flash	The CW	150th episode	"Heart of the Matter, Part 1"	July 13	
Ridiculousness	MTV	700th episode	"Chanel and Sterling CCCXXXII"	July 18	
Blaze and the Monster Machines	Nickelodeon	100th episode	"The Gold Medal Games"	July 23	
The Tonight Show Starring Jimmy Fallon	NBC	1500th episode	"Kit Harington/Miranda Cosgrove/Duran Duran"	August 12	
The Price Is Right	CBS	50th anniversary	"The Price Is Right 50th Anniversary Special"	September 30	
Chicago Fire	NBC	200th episode	"Two Hundred"	October 20	
Law & Order: Special Victims Unit	NBC	500th episode	"The Five Hundredth Episode"	October 21	
Pardon the Interruption	ESPN	20th anniversary	N/A	October 22	
The Voice	NBC	500th episode	"The Knockouts Part 2"	October 26	
Legends of Tomorrow	The CW	100th episode	"wvrdr_error_100<oest-of-th3-gs.gid30n> not found"	October 27	
The Challenge	MTV	500th episode	"500"	October 27	
Bubble Guppies	Nickelodeon	100th episode	"A Giant Harvest Day!"	November 11	
Full Frontal with Samantha Bee	TBS	200th episode	"December 8, 2021"	December 8	
The Late Late Show with James Corden	CBS	1000th episode	"Mariah Carey"	December 8	
Summer Camp Island	HBO Max	100th episode	"The Babies Chapter 3: Lem Is Nothing"	December 9	
Riverdale	The CW	100th episode	"Chapter One Hundred: The Jughead Paradox"	December 14	

=== Shows returning in 2021 ===
The following shows returned with new episodes after being canceled or having ended their run previously:

Show	Last aired	Type of return	Previous channel	New/returning/same channel	Return date	Source
Monster Garage	2006	Revival	Discovery Channel	Discovery+	January 4	
Name That Tune	1985	Revival	First-run syndication	Fox	January 6	
The Chase	2015	Revival	Game Show Network	ABC	January 7	
Walker, Texas Ranger (as Walker)	2001	Reboot	CBS	The CW	January 21	
Top Gear America	2017	Reboot	BBC America	Motor Trend	January 29	
The Equalizer	1989	Reboot	CBS	same	February 7	
Evil Lives Here	2020	New season	Investigation Discovery	Discovery+	February 14	
Modern Marvels	2015	Revival	History	same	February 21	
Chain Reaction	2016	Revival	Game Show Network	same	February 22	
Punky Brewster	1988	Revival	First-run syndication	Peacock	February 25	
Dinner: Impossible	2010	Revival	Food Network	same	March 11	
America's Most Wanted	2012	Revival	Lifetime	Fox	March 15	
Wipeout	2014	Reboot	ABC	TBS	April 1	
Kung Fu (modern-day version)	1997	Reboot	First-run syndication	The CW	April 7	
Younger	2019	New season	TV Land	Paramount+	April 15	
Kids Say the Darndest Things	2020	New season	ABC	CBS	May 5	
The Rich and the Ruthless	2019	New season	Allblk	BET+	May 13	
In Treatment	2010	Reboot	HBO	same	May 23	
Rugrats	2004	Reboot	Nickelodeon	Paramount+	May 27	
Tuca & Bertie	2019	New season	Netflix	Adult Swim	June 13	
iCarly	2012	Revival	Nickelodeon	Paramount+	June 17	
Evil	2020	New season	CBS	Paramount+	June 20	
College Bowl (as Capital One College Bowl)	1970	Revival	NBC	same	June 22	
RuPaul's Drag Race All Stars	2020	New season	VH1	Paramount+	June 24	
Up Close	2001	Revival	ESPN	ESPN+	June 30	
Gossip Girl	2012	Revival	The CW	HBO Max	July 8	
Pictionary	1998	Revival	First-run syndication	same (Note: Fox stations, begins full national syndication in fall 2022)	July 12	
Johnny Test	2014	Revival	Cartoon Network	Netflix	July 16	
Behind the Music	2014	Revival	VH1	Paramount+	July 29	
On the Record with Bob Costas (as Back on the Record with Bob Costas)	2004	Revival	HBO	same	July 30	
Fantasy Island	1999	Reboot	ABC	Fox	August 10	
MTV Cribs	2017	Revival	Snapchat	MTV	August 11	
Slasher	2019	New season	Netflix	Shudder	August 14	
You Bet Your Life	1993	Reboot	First-run syndication	same	September 13	
The Wonder Years (modern-day version)	1993	Reboot	ABC	same	September 22	
Cops	2020	New season	Paramount Network	Fox Nation	October 1	
Legends of the Hidden Temple	1995	Revival	Nickelodeon	The CW	October 10	
NHL on ESPN	2004	Revival	ESPN	same	October 12	
4400	2007	Reboot	USA Network	The CW	October 25	
Head of the Class	1991	Revival	ABC	HBO Max	November 4	
Dexter (as Dexter: New Blood)	2013	Revival	Showtime	same	November 7	
Condor	2018	New season	Audience	Epix	November 7	
The Game	2015	Revival	BET	Paramount+	November 11	
X-Play	2013	Revival	G4	same	November 17	
Attack of the Show!	2013	Revival	G4	same	November 18	
The Real Housewives of Miami	2013	New season	Bravo	Peacock	December 16	

=== Shows ending in 2021 ===
End date	Show	Channel	First aired	Status	Source
January 1	Earth to Ned	Disney+	2020	Canceled	
January 11	Lazor Wulf	Adult Swim	2019	Canceled	
January 15	The Astronauts	Nickelodeon	2019	Ended	
January 15	Carmen Sandiego	Netflix	2019	Ended	
January 20	Thomas & Friends	PBS Kids	2019	Canceled	
January 27	Bonding	Netflix	2021	Canceled	
January 28	Total Bellas	E!	2016	Canceled	
February 4	Lou Dobbs Tonight	Fox Business	1980	Canceled	
February 4	Esme & Roy	HBO Max	2018	Canceled	
February 4	Haute Dog	HBO Max	2020	Canceled	
February 7	Kitten Bowl	Hallmark Channel	2014	Canceled	
February 15	The Crew	Netflix	2021	Canceled	
February 15	Big Hero 6: The Series	Disney XD	2017	Ended	
February 15	The Tom and Jerry Show	Boomerang	2014	Ended	
February 19	Tell Me Your Secrets	Amazon Prime Video	2021	Ended	
February 24	For Life	ABC	2020	Canceled	
February 25	Punky Brewster	Peacock	2021	Canceled	
February 25	The Substitute	Nickelodeon	2019	Canceled	
March 15	DuckTales	Disney XD	2017	Ended	
March 18	The Unicorn	CBS	2019	Canceled	
March 19	Country Comfort	Netflix	2021	Canceled	
March 21	American Gods	Starz	2015	Canceled	
March 23	The Misery Index	TBS	2019	Canceled	
March 25	Superstore	NBC	2015	Ended	
March 28	Yum and Yummer	Cooking Channel	2019	Ended	
March 31	American Housewife	ABC	2016	Canceled	
April 9	Wynonna Earp	Syfy	2016	Ended	
April 11	Ben 10	Cartoon Network	2016	Ended	
April 11	Shameless	Showtime	2011	Ended	
April 14	Dad Stop Embarrassing Me!	Netflix	2021	Canceled	
April 15	Infinity Train	HBO Max	2019	Canceled	
April 16	Get a Clue	Game Show Network	2020	Canceled	
April 22	Bigger	BET+	2019	Canceled	
April 27	Delilah	Oprah Winfrey Network	2021	Canceled	
April 30	MacGyver	CBS	2016	Ended	
May 4	Selena: The Series	Netflix	2020	Ended	
May 7	Shrill	Hulu	2019	Ended	
May 7	Jupiter's Legacy	Netflix	2021	Canceled	
May 10	Race to the Center of the Earth	National Geographic	2021	Canceled	
May 13	Castlevania	Netflix	2017	Ended	
May 13	Mom	CBS	2013	Ended	
May 14	Just Roll with It	Disney Channel	2019	Canceled	
May 16	Zoey's Extraordinary Playlist	NBC	2020	Canceled	
May 17	Cheaters	First-run syndication	2000	Canceled	
May 18	Prodigal Son	Fox	2019	Canceled	
May 18	Mixed-ish	ABC	2019	Canceled	
May 18	Pooch Perfect	ABC	2021	Canceled	
May 19	Call Your Mother	ABC	2021	Canceled	
May 20	Ellen's Next Great Designer	HBO Max	2021	Canceled	
May 20	Special	Netflix	2019	Ended	
May 20	Last Man Standing	Fox	2011	Ended	
May 21	M.O.D.O.K.	Hulu	2021	Canceled	
May 22	Iyanla: Fix My Life	Oprah Winfrey Network	2012	Ended	
May 23	NCIS: New Orleans	CBS	2014	Ended	
May 23	Ellen's Game of Games	NBC	2017	Canceled	
May 24	Debris	NBC	2021	Canceled	
May 24	Black Lightning	The CW	2018	Ended	
May 28	The Kominsky Method	Netflix	2018	Ended	
May 28	Panic	Amazon Prime Video	2021	Canceled	
June 3	A Little Late with Lilly Singh	NBC	2019	Ended	
June 3	Everything's Gonna Be Okay	Freeform	2020	Canceled	
June 6	Pose	FX	2018	Ended	
June 7	Best Baker in America	Food Network	2017	Ended	
June 9	Queen of the South	USA Network	2016	Ended	
June 10	Younger	Paramount+	2015	Ended	
June 10	Rebel	ABC	2021	Canceled	
June 14	Final Space	Adult Swim	2018	Canceled	
June 20	Bless the Harts	Fox	2019	Canceled	
June 20	The Moodys	Fox	2019	Canceled	
June 20	Keeping Up with the Kardashians	E!	2007	Ended	
June 24	Conan	TBS	2010	Ended	
June 25	Bosch	Amazon Prime Video	2014	Ended	
June 25	Van Helsing	Syfy	2016	Ended	
June 28	Vampirina	Disney Jr.	2017	Ended	
June 28	In Treatment	HBO	2008	Ended	
June 30	The Bold Type	Freeform	2017	Ended	
July 7	NHL on NBC	NBC/NBCSN	2005	Ended	
July 7	Card Sharks	ABC	2019	Canceled	
July 8	Generation	HBO Max	2021	Canceled	
July 9	Atypical	Netflix	2017	Ended	
July 13	Mr Inbetween	FX	2018	Ended	
July 13	Good Eats: The Return (Note: Early release on March 25 on Discovery+)	Food Network	2019	Ended	
July 15	9 Months with Courteney Cox	Facebook Watch	2019	Canceled	
July 16	Betty	HBO	2020	Canceled	
July 19	Small Fortune	NBC	2021	Canceled	
July 20	The Haves and the Have Nots	Oprah Winfrey Network	2013	Ended	
July 22	Good Girls	NBC	2018	Canceled	
July 23	Judge Judy	First-run syndication	1996	Ended	
July 25	Good Witch	Hallmark Channel	2015	Ended	
July 28	Match Game	ABC	2016	Canceled	
July 29	Why Women Kill	Paramount+	2019	Canceled	
July 29	Transformers: War for Cybertron Trilogy	Netflix	2020	Ended	
July 29	The Prince	HBO Max	2021	Canceled	
August 1	Black Monday	Showtime	2019	Canceled	
August 4	Home & Family	Hallmark Channel	2012	Ended	
August 4	The Hills: New Beginnings	MTV	2019	Canceled	
August 4	Cooking with Paris	Netflix	2021	Canceled	
August 6	Hit & Run	Netflix	2021	Canceled	
August 13	Home Before Dark	Apple TV+	2020	Canceled	
August 16	The Celebrity Dating Game	ABC	2021	Canceled	
August 18	Diary of a Future President	Disney+	2020	Canceled	
August 18	Chasing Classic Cars	Motor Trend	2008	Canceled	
September 2	A.P. Bio	Peacock	2018	Canceled	
September 2	Q-Force	Netflix	2021	Canceled	
September 5	60 Minutes+	Paramount+	2021	Canceled	
September 6	The Republic of Sarah	The CW	2021	Canceled	
September 6	CBS This Morning	CBS	2012	Ended	
September 10	Lucifer	Netflix	2016	Ended	
September 10	Highly Questionable	ESPN	2011	Canceled	
September 15	House Calls with Dr. Phil	CBS	2021	Canceled	
September 16	Brooklyn Nine-Nine	NBC	2013	Ended	
September 21	The Ultimate Surfer	ABC	2021	Canceled	
September 22	Dear White People	Netflix	2017	Ended	
September 23	The Hustler	ABC	2021	Canceled	
September 24	Goliath	Amazon Prime Video	2016	Ended	
October 1	Scooby-Doo and Guess Who?	HBO Max	2019	Ended	
October 1	Mickey Mouse Mixed-Up Adventures	Disney Junior	2017	Canceled	
October 1	Mr. Corman	Apple TV+	2021	Canceled	
October 4	On My Block	Netflix	2018	Ended	
October 4	Poker After Dark	NBCSN	2007	Canceled	
October 6	Turner & Hooch	Disney+	2021	Canceled	
October 7	The Outpost	The CW	2018	Canceled	
October 8	Pretty Smart	Netflix	2021	Canceled	
October 8	A Tale Dark & Grimm	Netflix	2021	Canceled	
October 8	The Jump	ESPN	2016	Canceled	
October 10	Work in Progress	Showtime	2019	Canceled	
October 11	The Baby-Sitters Club	Netflix	2020	Canceled	
October 13	Just Beyond	Disney+	2021	Canceled	
October 14	Another Life	Netflix	2019	Canceled	
October 14	Archibald's Next Big Thing	Peacock	2019	Canceled	
October 15	Liza on Demand	YouTube Premium	2018	Ended	
October 21	Go! Go! Cory Carson	Netflix	2020	Ended	
October 21	The Girl in the Woods	Peacock	2021	Ended	
October 24	DC Super Hero Girls	Cartoon Network	2019	Canceled	
October 31	Chapelwaite	Epix	2021	Canceled	
November 1	Y: The Last Man	FX on Hulu	2021	Canceled	
November 4	The Harper House	Paramount+	2021	Canceled	
November 4	Head of the Class	HBO Max	2021	Canceled	
November 5	Narcos: Mexico	Netflix	2018	Ended	
November 5	Home Sweet Home	NBC	2021	Ended	
November 9	Supergirl	The CW	2015	Ended	
November 10	Gentefied	Netflix	2020	Canceled	
November 11	Love Life	HBO Max	2020	Canceled	
November 12	Snoopy in Space	Apple TV+	2021	Canceled	
November 12	I Know What You Did Last Summer	Amazon Prime Video	2021	Canceled	
November 18	Craftopia	HBO Max	2020	Canceled	
November 18	The Lost Symbol	Peacock	2021	Canceled	
November 19	Cowboy Bebop	Netflix	2021	Canceled	
November 19	Gentefied	Netflix	2020	Canceled	
November 21	Wicked Tuna: Outer Banks	National Geographic Channel	2014	Canceled	
November 24	Saved by the Bell	Peacock	2020	Canceled	
November 24	Hanna	Amazon Prime Video	2019	Ended	
November 25	F Is for Family	Netflix	2015	Ended	
November 25	12 Dates of Christmas	HBO Max	2020	Canceled	
November 26	Sydney to the Max	Disney Channel	2019	Ended	
November 26	Gabby Duran & the Unsittables	Disney Channel	2019	Canceled	
November 27	Dallas Cowboys Cheerleaders: Making the Team	CMT	2006	Canceled	
November 29	Cuomo Prime Time	CNN	2017	Canceled	
November 30	The Hot Zone	National Geographic	2019	Canceled	
December 1	Lost in Space	Netflix	2018	Ended	
December 1	The Sinner	USA Network	2017	Ended	
December 3	PEN15	Hulu	2019	Ended	
December 3	Disney's Magic Bake-Off	Disney Channel	2021	Ended	
December 5	The Walking Dead: World Beyond	AMC	2020	Ended	
December 6	The Big Leap	Fox	2021	Canceled	
December 7	Centaurworld	Netflix	2021	Ended	
December 7	Apple & Onion	Cartoon Network	2018	Ended	
December 8	Alter Ego	Fox	2021	Canceled	
December 10	Crossing Swords	Hulu	2020	Canceled	
December 13	Joe Pera Talks with You	Adult Swim	2018	Canceled	
December 13	Squidbillies	Adult Swim	2005	Ended	
December 16	The Fungies!	HBO Max	2020	Canceled	
December 16	Finding Magic Mike	HBO Max	2021	Canceled	
December 17	Fast & Furious Spy Racers	Netflix	2019	Ended	
December 21	The Last O.G.	TBS	2018	Canceled	
December 23	The Kids Tonight Show	Peacock	2021	Canceled	
December 24	Dickinson	Apple TV+	2019	Ended	
December 26	Insecure	HBO	2016	Ended	

=== Entering syndication in 2021 ===
A list of programs (current or canceled) that have accumulated enough episodes (between 65 and 100) or seasons (three or more) to be eligible for off-network syndication and/or basic cable runs.

Show	Seasons	In Production	Notes	Source
Chicago Fire	9	Yes		
Bull	5	Yes		
Young Sheldon	4	Yes		
SEAL Team	4	Yes		

== Networks and services ==
=== Launches ===
Network	Type	Launch date	Notes	Source
Discovery+	OTT streaming	January 4	Announced in September 2020 as a global expansion of its existing India service (launched in March of that year), Discovery, Inc. launched Discovery+ as a streaming service featuring original and archival content from Discovery's network and production properties (including the former networks of Scripps Networks Interactive acquired by the company in March 2018) as well as select programming from A&E Networks.	
Twist	OTA multicast	April 5	Tegna revealed plans on February 24 to launch Twist, which joins True Crime Network and Quest in the company's multicast portfolio. Twist targets a female audience with factual lifestyle and reality programming, mainly home- and food-oriented shows sourced from the libraries of A&E Networks and NBCUniversal Lifestyle Network Group. The "exciting reveals" featured in these shows serve as the inspiration for the network's name.	
MeTV+	OTA multicast	May 15	On May 3, Weigel Broadcasting announced plans to launch MeTV+, an experimental spin-off of flagship network MeTV with a lineup of classic sitcoms, drama series, and comedic and animated shorts sourced from the libraries of Sony Pictures Television, CBS Media Ventures, Warner Bros. Domestic Television Distribution and NBCUniversal Syndication Studios complementary to the offerings on its parent network. At the outset, MeTV+—the second MeTV extension effort by Weigel, following a local "MeToo" service that ran on WMEU-CD/Chicago (now an independent station) from 2008 to 2013—launched on Weigel-owned Chicago flagship WCIU-TV and KMOH-TV/Kingman–Phoenix, occupying subchannels that carried Bounce TV (which shifted to local Ion stations owned by the E. W. Scripps Company, parent of Bounce owner Katz Broadcasting). If successful, Weigel plans to expand MeTV+ to stations that the company owns in other markets (including as a replacement for Bounce TV on Weigel stations that carried the network since its 2011 debut) and to affiliates owned by third-party station groups.	
Defy TV	OTA multicast	July 1	On March 2, the E. W. Scripps Company announced plans to add two new networks to its digital broadcast portfolio (joining its six existing networks, which include Ion, Bounce TV and Court TV). Defy and TrueReal (the latter had initially been billed as Doozy) would respectively target men and women in the 25-54 age range with factual lifestyle and reality programming. On Ion O&Os and INYO Broadcast Holdings-owned Ion affiliates, Defy TV and TrueReal primarily occupied subchannels formerly affiliated with QVC and HSN. (Qurate Retail Group, the parent of the respective home shopping networks, ended its channel-lease agreement with Ion Media on June 29.)	
TrueReal	OTA multicast	July 1		
AccuWeather Now	OTT streaming	August 17	On July 29, AccuWeather announced plans to launch AccuWeather Now, a 24-hour live streaming weather news and information network. To differentiate from its cable and satellite channel AccuWeather Network, it would include liberal amounts of social media content, viral videos and feature stories in addition to its core product of weather forecasts. The service initially launched on The Roku Channel's live TV service on August 17.	
El Rey Network	Relaunch as OTT streaming channel (previously on cable/satellite and digital from 2013 to 2020)	August 17	On August 7, 2021, Robert Rodriguez and FactoryMade Ventures announced they had entered into a partnership with Cinedigm to relaunch El Rey Network—which ceased operating as a traditional pay television network in December 2020, after AT&T and Spectrum dropped it from their systems as well as in the wake of Univision Communications's withdrawal as a minority stakeholder—as a free, ad-supported live streaming channel. As a streaming channel, the English-language Latino-oriented network initially debuted on The Roku Channel's live TV service on August 17.	
Rewind TV	OTA multicast	September 1	On April 26, Nexstar Media Group announced plans to launch Rewind TV, a spin-off of Antenna TV targeting adults 25–54 (primarily towards Gen Xers) and focusing on classic sitcoms from the 1980s and 1990s. Rewind—which initially launched on subchannels of stations owned or managed by Nexstar in markets reaching 45% of U.S. television households, occupying subchannel slots vacated by Katz-owned networks being transferred to Scripps-owned network affiliates and Ion O&O/affiliate stations in some markets—draws from the libraries of Sony Pictures Television, CBS Media Ventures, Warner Bros. Domestic Television Distribution and NBCUniversal Syndication Studios, and initially included many series (including Murphy Brown, The Facts of Life, Who's the Boss? and Family Ties) previously acquired for Antenna TV, which began phasing out post-1970s series from its lineup in April as it shifts to a narrowed focus on sitcoms from the late 1950s, 1960s and 1970s (Antenna TV continued to offer a more limited lineup of post-1970s sitcoms in the interim).	
Novelisima	OTA multicast	September 4	On September 1, Grupo Cisneros announced it had entered into a distribution agreement with HC2 Broadcasting to launch Novelisima, a 24-hour multicast network focusing on imported telenovelas.	
Fuse+	OTT streaming	September 13	Following a beta launch in June, on September 13, Fuse Media officially launched Fuse+, a subscription streaming service focusing on multicultural programming aimed at millennials. The service—which is priced at $1.99/month (or $19.99/year), with paywalled content accessible for free using login credentials provided to subscribers of participating cable and satellite services that carry either of its co-owned linear channels, Fuse and FM—incorporated an initial slate of over 500 hours of original content, consisting of Fuse original programs (with new episodes airing day-and-date with the linear channel), independent films and documentaries, along with a selection of supplemental music, Black cultural, hip-hop and archival home fitness programs that are also available through a free, ad-supported tier for non-subscribers.	
Digi TV	OTA multicast	September 27	On September 8, Net X Holdings, LLC announced plans to launch Digi TV, a multicast network focusing on imported English-language programming. Initially launching primarily on subchannels of Univision and UniMás stations owned by Univision Communications and Tri-State Christian Television O&Os, the network airs a mix of scripted and reality-based entertainment, knowledge-based and lifestyle programming primarily sourced from the United Kingdom and Australia.	
Fox Weather	OTT streaming/OTA multicast	October 25	On December 29, 2020, Fox News Media announced plans to launch Fox Weather, a 24-hour streaming weather channel intended to compete with The Weather Channel, AccuWeather Network and WeatherNation TV (the latter of which has long been streamed for free on the network's app and on ad-supported streaming platforms such as Pluto TV). The service would be available as a standalone app and website, and feature live programming utilizing resources of its own meteorologists and meteorologists from local Fox Television Stations properties as well as local, regional and national weather updates. Critics, citing shared management between the two services, have expressed concern that Fox Weather might express opinions dismissive of climate change mirroring similar commentary made in recent years by Fox News personalities and contributors. Those FTS stations also began carrying the network as a subchannel in the first quarter of 2022.	
G4	Linear cable/satellite and digital	November 16	On July 24, 2020, the Twitter accounts of G4TV and G4's Attack of the Show! and X-Play, reactivated to post a teaser video of a G4 revival in some form (either as a wireline or streaming channel, though not disclosed at the time), slated for 2021. (On October 12, 2021, Comcast confirmed that the revived G4—like its original iteration—would be distributed as a cable-originated network, with Verizon Fios, Cox, Xfinity and Philo among its charter carriers.) The teasers were timed for Comic-Con@Home, the first virtual streaming edition of the annual fan convention, San Diego Comic-Con. Consequently, G4's website also redirected to a nonstop game of Pong (which if won, redirects to a mailing list sign up for updates), once again reflecting back to the network's original launch in 2002 and their shutdown in 2014.	

=== Conversions and rebrandings ===
Old network name	New network name	Type	Conversion date	Notes	Source
Urban Movie Channel	Allblk	OTT streaming	January 6	AMC Networks rebranded Urban Movie Channel – launched in 2014 as the first streaming service dedicated to television programs and films aimed at Black audiences, and content made by Black filmmakers – as Allblk, citing the original name no longer fit the brand, its audience or culture (several "urban"-branded broadcasters, along with radio stations formerly under the urban contemporary banner, switched to other descriptive terms throughout 2020). The service also increases original programming, having debuted seven series in 2021.	
Light TV	TheGrio	Over-the-air multicast/ OTT streaming	January 15	Following its acquisition of the network's satellite slot from Metro-Goldwyn-Mayer, Allen Media Group relaunched the former channel space of family-oriented digital multicast network Light TV as TheGrio (branded after the Black cultural news and entertainment website of the same name acquired by parent company Entertainment Studios in 2016), adopting a focus primarily around movies, along with selected television series, news and lifestyle content aimed at African American audiences. There has been some confusion however, as Light TV continues to run on some affiliates and online, while some former Light TV affiliates stopped carrying the network in the run-up to TheGrio's launch.	
WGN America	NewsNation	Cable/satellite	March 1	On January 25, 2021, Nexstar Media Group announced it would relaunch the entertainment-oriented WGN America (a name traced to its existence as a superstation feed of WGN-TV/Chicago from the channel's launch in November 1978 until its content separation from WGN-TV in December 2014) as the news-centric NewsNation, named after the prime time newscast that the channel debuted in September 2020, effective March 1. The rebrand coincides with a gradual expansion of its news programming that initially includes the additions of an hour-long early-evening newscast, the hour-long Donlon Report (a prime-access newscast fronted by NewsNation anchor Joe Donlon) and a weeknight news/interview program hosted by Ashleigh Banfield, as well as a condensed version of the retitled NewsNationPrime (to be reduced from three hours to two). A reduced schedule of entertainment programs in its inventory continues to be featured in daytime and overnight slots (along with early morning paid and religious programming), to be replaced with news content once syndication contracts expire.	
CBS All Access	Paramount+	OTT streaming	March 4	CBS All Access adopts the Paramount+ name used in certain international markets. The rebranding occurs amid an ongoing expansion of the service — originally developed as a subscription platform for CBS featuring original programs, content from the CBS television network and its syndication arm CBS Media Ventures, and live streams of local CBS stations, CBS' ad-supported OTT services and events from CBS Sports – to include content from other television and film brands owned by ViacomCBS (including Paramount Pictures, MTV, BET, Comedy Central and Nickelodeon).	
Vix	PrendeTV	OTT streaming	March 30	On January 12, Univision Communications announced it would launch PrendeTV, a free, ad-supported Spanish-language streaming service aimed at U.S. Hispanics and Latinos in the first quarter of the year, formally launching on March 30. The platform, which is the first AVOD platform dedicated exclusively to Spanish content, offers over 30 curated channels (similar to those featured on services like Pluto TV, Peacock and Xumo) and approximately 20,000 hours of Spanish-language and -dubbed movies and television series for video-on-demand viewing from Univision and third-party providers including Walt Disney Studios Motion Pictures, Grupo Globo, Caracol Televisión, Banijay, FilmRise, Nelvana, RCN, Lionsgate and MGM. The service was built off the infrastructure of and inherit content from Pan-American streaming service Vix, which Univision bought from a consortium of Batanga Media, Discovery Inc. and HarbourVest Partners on February 1.	
Fox Sports Networks	Bally Sports	Cable/satellite	March 31	Sinclair Broadcast Group, as part of a partnership with Entertainment Studios, acquired the regional networks formerly owned by Fox Sports parent News Corporation in 2019. (Disney was required by the Department of Justice to divest the channels during its acquisition of 21st Century Fox on antitrust grounds due to its ownership of ESPN Inc.) Sinclair reached a cross-partnership with gaming company Bally's Corporation in November 2020, which led to the channels shedding the "Fox Sports" brand after more than 24 years in favor of "Bally Sports"; the move coincided with the start of the 2021 Major League Baseball season the next day.	
Newsy		Conversion from cable/satellite to over-the-air distribution (to retain carriage on ad-supported OTT services)	June 30 (pay-TV discontinuation); October 1 (start of OTA distribution)	After years as a cable and over-the-top service, on April 6, the E. W. Scripps Company announced plans to transition its 24-hour news channel, Newsy, to a new distribution model as an over-the-air multicast service—although it would continue to maintain supplemental streaming distribution through its Internet apps and existing partnerships with ad-supported Internet television providers. Scripps thus began terminating the network's existing contracts with wireline and vMVPD providers (instead of opting for converting them to must-carry arrangements, similar to those employed by other OTA multicast networks such as MeTV, GetTV and Heroes & Icons) beginning June 30, with end dates varying by provider throughout the Summer. Newsy relaunched as a digital multicast network on October 1, carried primarily through Scripps's television stations (via both the group's major network affiliates and Ion Television O&Os as well as through commiserate carriage via retransmission consent agreements for Scripps/Ion stations) and through third-party affiliation agreements in non-Scripps markets.	
SportsGrid Network		Conversion to over-the-air distribution (to retain carriage on ad-supported and subscription OTT services)	September 1 (start of OTA distribution)	On August 25, Nexstar Media Group announced a partnership with SportsGrid Inc. to offer the latter's sports betting- and fantasy sports-focused streaming news service SportsGrid Network as a digital multicast network starting September 1. SportsGrid, which retains its existing distribution through its Internet apps and Internet television providers (such as Xumo, Samsung TV Plus and Sling TV), was initially available in nine Nexstar markets (including San Francisco, Washington, D.C., Tampa, Nashville and Portland) where the company's subchannel leasing agreements with Katz Networks properties lapsed the day prior. (The Court TV, Court TV Mystery, Laff and Bounce TV affiliations to be affected in the corresponding markets became exclusive to subchannels of parent company Scripps’ Ion O&O stations that had added them on a transitional basis following the February 28 closures of Ion Plus, Qubo and Ion Shop.)	
Great American Country	GAC Family	Cable/satellite	September 27	As a consequence of GAC Media's June 7 purchases of Great American Country (from Discovery, Inc.) and Ride TV (from Ride Television Network, Inc.), on September 27, the two networks underwent branding and programming overhauls: Great American Country was rebranded as GAC Family and restructured from a country lifestyle programming format to a family-oriented entertainment network—featuring a mix of original and acquired programming, both scripted and unscripted—similar in concept to Hallmark Channel (which GAC Media CEO William J. Abbott oversaw as head of Crown Media Family Networks from 2009 to 2020), while Ride TV rebranded as GAC Living and expanded from its original focus on equestrian sports to center around Southern- and country-oriented unscripted lifestyle programming. (The "GAC" initialism was concurrently backronymed by its new corporate parent from the previous "Great American Country" moniker to "Great American Channels".)	
Ride TV	GAC Living	Cable/satellite	September 27		

=== Closures ===
Network	Type	End date	Notes	Source
DC Universe	OTT streaming	January 21	In September 2020, DC announced that the DC Universe streaming service would be folded into DC Universe Infinite as a solely digital comics subscription service on January 21, 2021. DC Universe subscriptions would automatically transfer over to DC Universe Infinite. Original programs Young Justice, Titans, Doom Patrol, and Harley Quinn moved to HBO Max and became Max Original series starting their new seasons, while Stargirl moved to The CW with its second season.	
Ion Plus	Over-the-air multicast	February 28	Following the completion of its acquisition of Ion Media, on January 14, the E. W. Scripps Company announced the shuttering of three Ion networks – Ion Plus (a secondary schedule of programming from Ion's content distributors), Ion Shop (all-paid programming) and Qubo (children's programming) – and allocate their spectrum space on Ion Media's stations to offer networks from existing Scripps subsidiary Katz Broadcasting (consisting of Court TV, Court TV Mystery, Bounce TV, Laff and Grit). This eventually consolidates Ion's operations into Katz and replace expiring contracts with other broadcasters that carried the Katz networks outside of mainstream Scripps markets (albeit with affiliate duplication in the interim due to the structure of Katz's subchannel-leasing arrangements), while offloading those networks on mainstream Scripps stations with limited spectrum capacity during the ATSC 3.0 transition. (Ion's namesake flagship channel continues as a Scripps-owned network.) Qubo, Ion Plus and Ion Shop were replaced by selected Katz networks on Ion affiliates (consisting mainly of former O&Os spun off by Scripps to Inyo Broadcast Holdings) on February 27, and were replaced on Scripps-owned Ion stations post-shutdown on March 1.	
Ion Shop	Over-the-air multicast	February 28		
Qubo	Over-the-air multicast	February 28		
WWE Network	OTT streaming	March 18 (United States)	On January 25, WWE announced it would discontinue the standalone WWE Network service in the United States and merge it into the offerings of Peacock. All paying Peacock subscribers gained access to the WWE Video Library and no-cost access to WWE pay-per-view events in the same manner as current WWE Network subscribers. WWE Network remains unchanged outside of the United States.	
CNN Airport	Closed-circuit international airport television systems	March 31	On January 12, CNN announced that it would shut down the CNN Airport network, which was available in numerous airports across the United States. The network, which carried a mixture of family-friendly news and entertainment programs from select WarnerMedia networks (as well as some high-profile sporting events), had been seeing declining viewership since the 2008 financial crisis as a result of the increased proliferation of Wi-Fi-enabled devices which themselves allow access to the mainline CNN network; the decline was accelerated in 2020 when global commercial air travel declined greatly as a result of the COVID-19 pandemic.	
NBC Sports Northwest	Cable and satellite	September 30	On June 9, NBC Sports Group announced it was shutting down NBC Sports Northwest, which launched in 2007 as Comcast SportsNet Northwest and later rebranded as CSN Northwest in 2012 and to NBC Sports Northwest in 2017. The closure came after the Portland Trail Blazers (a key team part of the network's programming since its inception) signed a four-year deal with Root Sports Northwest on the same date.	
Hotstar (U.S. only)	OTT streaming	November 30	On August 31, 2021, Disney announced that the U.S. version of Hotstar—targeted domestically at mainly American-born and expatriate Indians—would cease operations as a standalone platform by around late 2022. On the date of the announcement, Bollywood and South Asian films, television series and original specials featured in Hotstar's U.S. catalog (which will be rotated on and off at regular intervals) were added to Hulu, while the service's rights to Indian Premier League, ICC Men's T20 World Cup and BCCI-sanctioned cricket competitions were incorporated into ESPN+. Hotstar (alternately branded as Disney+ Hotstar in Asia) will continue to operate in parts of South Asia (specifically India, Indonesia, Malaysia, Thailand and Singapore), Canada and the United Kingdom. The closure date was brought forward by over a year with less than 2 weeks' notice on November 18, 2021.	
ESPN Classic	Cable and satellite	December 31	On November 4, ESPN confirmed the closure of the network, originally launched as Classic Sports Network in 1995 before its 1997 acquisition by ESPN. The network had already lost library programming over the years and was slowly wound down as ESPN had allowed various providers to drop the network in retransmission consent negotiations since the mid-2010s in order to pick up new ESPN networks as replacements.	
Fusion TV	Cable and satellite	December 31	On December 4, Univision Communications confirmed through notice to its remaining providers the closure of Fusion, originally launched in October 2013 with a focus on news, lifestyle, pop culture, satire and entertainment programs aimed at English-speaking millennials, including those of a Hispanic background. The network—which was founded as a joint venture between Univision and The Walt Disney Company (through ABC News), the latter which sold its stake in 2016—struggled to maintain a consistent programming identity (experiencing heavy churn of its news and documentary programs, while shifting more toward a documentary and entertainment format in its waning years); to obtain widespread distribution across wireline, satellite and live-TV streaming providers; and to attract sufficient viewership in its target demographic throughout its eight-year existence. Fusion also incurred significant profit losses over its run (incurring deficits of $35 million in 2014 alone) as Univision struggled through an era under the management of private equity which mandated the launch of English-language inroads; the network is currently in the process of merging with longtime content partner Televisa and focusing exclusively on Spanish-language audiences. It was the second consecutive year a Univision-funded English-language channel shut down, as El Rey Network's wireline network was shut down exactly a year before, several months after it spun off its interest in the channel.	
NBCSN	Cable and satellite	December 31	On January 22, NBC Sports Group announced it was shutting down NBCSN, which launched in 1995 as the Outdoor Life Network and later rebranded as Versus before becoming the NBC Sports Network in 2012 and adopting its current name in 2013. Its programming, which includes the Premier League and NASCAR races, moves primarily to NBC and USA Network as well as the Peacock streaming service. A cornerstone of NBCSN's programming had been the National Hockey League, whose contract with NBC Sports expired at the end of the abbreviated 2021 season.	

== Television stations ==
=== Subchannel launches ===
Date	Market	Station	Channel	Affiliation	Source
January 1	Cedar Rapids, Iowa	KFXA	28.5	Comet	
January 1	Charleston, West Virginia	WCHS	8.3	Antenna TV	
January 1	Charleston, West Virginia	WVAH-TV	11.4	Charge!	
January 1	Charleston, West Virginia	WVAH-TV	11.5	TBD	
January 1	Columbus, Ohio	WSYX	6.4	Antenna TV	
January 1	Dayton, Ohio	WRGT-TV	45.5	TBD	
January 1	Dayton, Ohio	WRGT-TV	45.6	Stadium	
January 1	Idaho Falls-Pocatello, Idaho	KIFI-TV	8.5	Telemundo	
February 4	Sioux City, Iowa	KMEG	14.4	Stadium	
February 15	Albuquerque, New Mexico	KNME-TV	5.4	World Channel	
February 15	Albuquerque, New Mexico	KNME-TV	5.5	Create	
March 1	Columbus, Ohio	WSFJ-TV	51.2	Grit	
March 1	Indianapolis, Indiana	WRTV	6.5	HSN	
March 1	Kansas City, Missouri	KSHB-TV	41.4	GetTV	
March 1	Miami, Florida	WSFL-TV	39.5	QVC	
March 1	Norfolk, Virginia	WGNT	27.5	QVC2	
March 1	Norfolk, Virginia	WGNT	27.6	HSN2	
March 1	Raleigh, North Carolina	WRPX-TV	47.4	Grit	
April 1	Chicago, Illinois	WLS-TV	7.3	This TV	
April 1	Fresno, California	KFSN-TV	30.4	HSN	
April 1	Houston, Texas	KTRK-TV	13.4	QVC	
April 1	Los Angeles, California	KABC-TV	7.4	QVC2	
April 1	New York City, New York	WABC-TV	7.4	HSN	
April 1	Philadelphia, Pennsylvania	WPVI-TV	6.4	QVC	
April 1	Raleigh, North Carolina	WTVD	11.4	HSN	
April 1	San Francisco, California	KGO-TV	7.4	HSN	
April 5	Atlanta, Georgia	WXIA-TV	11.2	Twist	
April 5	Buffalo, New York	WGRZ	2.5	Twist	
April 5	Charleston, South Carolina	WBSE-LD	20.2	Twist	
April 5	Charlotte, North Carolina	WCNC-TV	36.5	Twist	
April 5	Chicago, Illinois	WGBO-DT	66.6	Twist	
April 5	Cleveland, Ohio	WKYC	3.5	Twist	
April 5	Columbia, South Carolina	WLTX	19.5	Twist	
April 5	Dallas-Fort Worth, Texas	WFAA	8.9	Twist	
April 5	Davenport, Iowa-Moline, Illinois	WQAD-TV	8.5	Twist	
April 5	Denver, Colorado	KUSA	9.7	Twist	
April 5	Des Moines, Iowa	WOI-DT	5.5	Twist	
April 5	Detroit, Michigan	WADL	38.8	Twist	
April 5	Fort Smith, Arkansas	KFSM-TV	5.4	Twist	
April 5	Fort Wayne, Indiana	WCUH-LD	16.2	Twist	
April 5	Grand Rapids, Michigan	WZZM	13.5	Twist	
April 5	Greensboro, North Carolina	WFMY-TV	2.6	Twist	
April 5	Hartford, Connecticut	WTIC-TV	61.5	Twist	
April 5	Houston, Texas	KHOU	11.4	Twist	
April 5	Jacksonville, Florida	WJXX	25.5	Twist	
April 5	Las Vegas, Nevada	K36NE-D	43.3	Twist	
April 5	Little Rock, Arkansas	KTHV	11.6	Twist	
April 5	Los Angeles, California	KMEX-DT	34.6	Twist	
April 5	Macon, Georgia	WMAZ-TV	13.5	Twist	
April 5	Miami-Fort Lauderdale, Florida	WLTV-DT	23.5	Twist	
April 5	New Orleans, Louisiana	WWL-TV	4.4	Twist	
April 5	New York City, New York	WXTV-DT	41.3	Twist	
April 5	Norfolk, Virginia	WVEC	13.5	Twist	
April 5	Philadelphia, Pennsylvania	WFPA-CD	28.4	Twist	
April 5	Portland, Oregon	KGW	8.4	Twist	
April 5	Sacramento, California	KXTV	10.5	Twist	
April 5	St. Louis, Missouri	KSDK	5.5	Twist	
April 5	Salt Lake City, Utah	KUTH-DT	36.6	Twist	
April 5	San Francisco, California	KFSF-DT	66.6	Twist	
April 12	Louisville, Kentucky	WHAS-TV	11.5	Twist	
April 12	Washington, D.C.	WUSA	9.4	Twist	
April 19	Memphis, Tennessee	WATN-TV	24.4	Twist	
April 26	Austin, Texas	KVUE	24.6	Twist	
April 26	Knoxville, Tennessee	WBIR-TV	10.5	Twist	
April 26	Phoenix, Arizona	KPNX	12.5	Twist	
May 3	Amarillo, Texas	KLKW-LD	22.6	Twist	
May 10	Cleveland, Ohio	WOIO	19.4	Shop LC	
May 10	Midland/Odessa, Texas	KWES-TV	9.5	Twist	
May 10	San Antonio, Texas	KENS	5.6	Twist	
May 15	Kingman, Arizona (Phoenix)	KMOH-TV	6.3	MeTV Plus	
May 17	Tyler/Longview, Texas	KYTX	19.4	Twist	
May 24	Albuquerque, New Mexico	KLUZ-TV	19.6	Twist	
May 24	Boston, Massachusetts	WUNI	66.5	Twist	
June 7	Portland, Maine	WCSH	6.5	Twist	
July 1	Louisville, Kentucky	WBKI	58.5	TrueReal	
July 1	Louisville, Kentucky	WBKI	58.6	Defy TV	
July 5	Davenport, Iowa	KLJB	18.4	Bounce TV	
July 19	Harlingen, Texas	KGBT-TV	4.1	Antenna TV	
September 1	Albuquerque/Santa Fe, New Mexico	KWBQ	19.5	Rewind TV	
September 1	Amarillo, Texas	KCPN-LD	33.2	Rewind TV	
September 1	Austin, Texas	KXAN-TV	36.4	Rewind TV	
September 1	Chicago, Illinois	WGN-TV	9.5	TBD	
September 1	Chico/Redding, California	KUCO-LD	27.4	Rewind TV	
September 1	Dallas/Fort Worth, Texas	KDAF	33.5	Rewind TV	
September 1	Davenport, Iowa	KLJB	18.3	Rewind TV	
September 1	Evansville, Indiana	WEHT	25.4	Rewind TV	
September 1	Fayetteville/Fort Smith, Arkansas	KXNW	34.2	Rewind TV	
September 1	Fresno, California	KSEE	24.4	Rewind TV	
September 1	Green Bay, Wisconsin	WFRV-TV	5.4	Rewind TV	
September 1	Huntsville, Alabama	WHDF	15.3	Rewind TV	
September 1	Johnstown/Altoona/State College, Pennsylvania	WWCP-TV	8.4	Antenna TV	
September 1	Little Rock, Arkansas	KASN	38.2	Rewind TV	
September 1	Los Angeles, California	KTLA	5.5	Rewind TV	
September 1	Lubbock, Texas	KLBK-TV	13.4	Rewind TV	
September 1	Minneapolis/St. Paul, Minnesota	WUCW	23.5	Rewind TV	
September 1	Odessa/Midland, Texas	KPEJ-TV	24.3	Rewind TV	
September 1	Rockford, Illinois	WQRF-TV	39.4	Rewind TV	
September 1	Shreveport, Louisiana	KMSS-TV	33.2	Rewind TV	
September 1	Springfield, Missouri	KOZL-TV	27.4	Rewind TV	
September 1	Terre Haute, Indiana	WAWV-TV	38.4	Rewind TV	
September 1	Tyler/Longview, Texas	KIVY-LD	16.3	Rewind TV	
September 1	West Palm Beach, Florida	WWHB-CD	48.4	Rewind TV	
September 1	West Palm Beach, Florida	WTCN-CD	43.4	Dabl	
September 20	Nashville, Tennessee	WZTV	17.4	TBD	
September 20	Omaha, Nebraska	KPTM	42.4	Comet	
September 20	San Antonio, Texas	WOAI-TV	4.4	Charge!	
September 28	Bellingham, Washington	KVOS	12.5	MeTV Plus	
September 28	Seattle, Washington	KFFV	44.5	MeTV Plus	
October 1	Corpus Christi, Texas	KRIS-TV	6.5	Ion Television	
October 1	Corpus Christi, Texas	KRIS-TV	6.6	Newsy	
October 1	Richmond, Virginia	WTVR-TV	6.6	Newsy	
October 1	San Diego, California	KGTV	10.6	Newsy	

=== Stations changing network affiliations ===
This section outlines affiliation changes involving English and Spanish networks (ABC, NBC, CBS, Fox, PBS, The CW, Univision, etc.), and format conversions involving independent stations. Digital subchannels are mentioned if the prior or new affiliation involves a major English and Spanish broadcast network or a locally programmed independent entertainment format.

Date	Market	Station	Channel	Prior affiliation	New affiliation	Notes	Source
January 1	Cedar Rapids, Iowa	KGAN	2.2	GetTV	Fox	On January 1, KGAN began simulcasting KFXA for a one-month transitional period as Sinclair consolidated Fox affiliates in duopoly markets from their shell corporations to directly owned stations; GetTV concurrently moved to KGAN's third digital subchannel.	
January 1	Cedar Rapids, Iowa	KGAN	2.3	Comet	GetTV	On January 1, KGAN began simulcasting KFXA for a one-month transitional period as Sinclair consolidated Fox affiliates in duopoly markets from their shell corporations to directly owned stations; GetTV concurrently moved to KGAN's third digital subchannel.	
January 1	Charleston, West Virginia	WCHS-TV	8.2	Antenna TV	Fox	On January 1, WCHS-TV began simulcasting WVAH-TV for a one-month transitional period; Antenna TV concurrently moved to a new third digital subchannel of WCHS-TV.	
January 1	Columbus, Ohio	WSYX	6.3	Antenna TV	Fox	On January 1, WSYX began simulcasting WTTE for a one-month transitional period; Antenna TV concurrently moved to a new fourth digital subchannel of WSYX.	
January 1	Dayton, Ohio	WKEF	22.2	Stadium	Fox	WKEF-DT2 disaffiliated from Stadium on January 1; it concurrently began simulcasting sister station WRGT-TV for a one-month transitional period.	
January 1	Idaho Falls–Pocatello, Idaho	KIDK	3.1	CBS	Dabl	In December 2020, VistaWest Media LLC, owner of KIDK, announced that most of the station's CBS network and syndicated programing, and local newscasts from its KIDK Eyewitness News 3 operation would be transferred to the DT2 subchannel of News-Press & Gazette Company-owned ABC affiliate and SSA partner KIFI-TV on January 1. KIDK would concurrently switch to Dabl (which is also carried on its Fox-affiliated sister KXPI-LD), while Telemundo programming displaced from KIFI-DT2 would transfer to a new DT5 subchannel on that station.	
January 1	Idaho Falls–Pocatello, Idaho	KIFI-TV	8.2	Telemundo	CBS		
January 1	Port Arthur-Beaumont, Texas	KFDM	6.3	Charge!	Fox	KFDM-DT3 disaffiliated from Charge! on December 31, 2020; on January 1, the subchannel began simulcasting Fox-affiliated SSA partner KBTV-TV for a one-month transitional period.	
January 1	Santa Barbara-Santa Maria, California	KCOY-TV	11.1	CBS	Dabl	In December 2020, the News-Press & Gazette Company, owner of KCOY-TV, announced that the station's CBS network and syndicated programming and its local newscasts would be transferred to the DT2 subchannel of its ABC-affiliated sister station KEYT-TV on January 1. (KEYT had previously maintained a part-time affiliation with CBS from its May 1953 sign-on until KCOY began offering the network full-time after dropping its former primary NBC affiliation in 1969.). KCOY became affiliated with Dabl, relocating the diginet from its discontinued DT4 subchannel. To make room for the former KCOY intellectual unit on its DT2 feed (at which point, its local newscasts were retitled NewsChannel 12 to match KEYT's base news brand), KEYT-DT3—previously affiliated with Bounce TV—adopted a news rebroadcast format with MyNetworkTV programming (previously on KEYT-DT2) airing weeknights.	
January 1	Santa Barbara-Santa Maria, California	KEYT-TV	3.2	MyNetworkTV	CBS		
January 1	Santa Barbara-Santa Maria, California	KEYT-TV	3.3	Bounce TV	MyNetworkTV		
February 1	Dothan, Alabama	WDHN	18.4	Cozi TV	Antenna TV	Nexstar Media Group continues the process it launched in the fall of 2020 of phasing out subchannel carriage agreements with Cozi and MeTV, competitors in the classic television subchannel space, in order to increase exposure and publicity for Antenna TV on its existing stations, which it acquired in 2019 as part of the Tribune Broadcasting merger.	
February 1	Terre Haute, Indiana	WTWO	2.4	Cozi TV	Antenna TV	Nexstar Media Group continues the process it launched in the fall of 2020 of phasing out subchannel carriage agreements with Cozi and MeTV, competitors in the classic television subchannel space, in order to increase exposure and publicity for Antenna TV on its existing stations, which it acquired in 2019 as part of the Tribune Broadcasting merger.	
February 1	Monroe, Louisiana	KARD-TV	14.4	Cozi TV	Antenna TV	Nexstar Media Group continues the process it launched in the fall of 2020 of phasing out subchannel carriage agreements with Cozi and MeTV, competitors in the classic television subchannel space, in order to increase exposure and publicity for Antenna TV on its existing stations, which it acquired in 2019 as part of the Tribune Broadcasting merger.	
February 1	Joplin, Missouri	KSNF	16.4	Cozi TV	Antenna TV	Nexstar Media Group continues the process it launched in the fall of 2020 of phasing out subchannel carriage agreements with Cozi and MeTV, competitors in the classic television subchannel space, in order to increase exposure and publicity for Antenna TV on its existing stations, which it acquired in 2019 as part of the Tribune Broadcasting merger.	
February 1	Amarillo, Texas	KAMR-TV	4.4	Cozi TV	Antenna TV	Nexstar Media Group continues the process it launched in the fall of 2020 of phasing out subchannel carriage agreements with Cozi and MeTV, competitors in the classic television subchannel space, in order to increase exposure and publicity for Antenna TV on its existing stations, which it acquired in 2019 as part of the Tribune Broadcasting merger.	
February 1	Wichita Falls, Texas	KFDX-TV	3.4	Cozi TV	Antenna TV	Nexstar Media Group continues the process it launched in the fall of 2020 of phasing out subchannel carriage agreements with Cozi and MeTV, competitors in the classic television subchannel space, in order to increase exposure and publicity for Antenna TV on its existing stations, which it acquired in 2019 as part of the Tribune Broadcasting merger.	
February 1	Charleston, West Virginia	WVAH-TV	11.1	Fox	Decades	In December 2020, Sinclair Broadcast Group—which operates the station through Cunningham Broadcasting—announced that most of WVAH's Fox network and syndicated programing, its 10:00 p.m. Eyewitness News newscast (produced by ABC affiliated sister station WCHS-TV), and the "Fox 11" branding would transfer to the second subchannel of WCHS-TV beginning February 1, following a one-month transition period that began on January 1 as part of Sinclair's consolidation of Fox affiliates onto directly owned stations; the move ended WVAH's 34-year affiliation with Fox (dating to its 1987 national launch). After the transition, the station's main channel switched to the Weigel Broadcasting-owned Decades diginet.	
February 1	Port Arthur–Beaumont, Texas	KBTV-TV	4.1	Fox	Dabl	In December 2020, Sinclair Broadcast Group—which operated the station through Deerfield Media—announced that KBTV would disaffiliate from Fox after 13 years (ending a 67-year-run as a major network affiliate, having previously been with NBC from its 1953 sign on until 2008); the station switched to Dabl effective February 1, with its Fox network and syndicated programming, the 5:30 and 9:00 p.m. newscasts (produced by sister station KFDM) and the "Fox 4" branding being transferred to the third subchannel of KFDM on February 1, following a one-month transition period that began on January 1 as part of Sinclair's consolidation of Fox affiliates onto directly owned stations. Following this, KFDM becomes the second station in the Beaumont–Port Arthur market to maintain dual major network affiliations on its main channel and a digital subchannel (ABC affiliate KBMT has carried NBC programming on its DT2 subchannel since KBTV dropped the latter network).	
February 1	Port Arthur–Beaumont, Texas	KBTV-TV	4.5	Dabl	Charge!		
February 2	Cedar Rapids, Iowa	KGAN	2.2	GetTV	Fox	In December 2020, Sinclair Broadcast Group—which operates KFXA through Second Generation of Iowa, Ltd.—announced that the station would end its collective 33-year relationship with Fox (dating to KFXA's 1988 sign-on, with a ten-month sabbatical from October 1994 to August 1995 due to financial issues that caused its eviction from the station's original studios). KFXA's Fox network and syndicated programming, its weekday 7:00 a.m. and nightly 9:00 p.m. newscasts (produced by CBS-affiliated sister KGAN) and the "Fox 28" branding transferred to KGAN-DT2 on February 2, following a 33-day transition period that commenced on January 1 as part of Sinclair's consolidation of Fox affiliates onto directly owned stations; following the switch, GetTV programming moved from KFXA-DT2 to KGAN-DT3, Comet programming moved from KGAN-DT3 to the newly launched KFXA-DT5, and Dabl programming moved from KGAN-DT4 (discontinued to allocate HD bandwidth for KGAN-DT2) to KFXA's main channel.	
February 2	Cedar Rapids, Iowa	KGAN	2.3	Comet	GetTV		
February 2	Cedar Rapids, Iowa	KFXA	28.1	Fox	Dabl		
February 3	Columbus, Ohio	WTTE	28.1	Fox	TBD	In December 2020, Sinclair Broadcast Group—which operates WRGT and WTTE through Cunningham Broadcasting—announced that both stations would end their 34-year relationship with Fox (dating to the network's 1987 national debut). In Dayton, WRGT's Fox network and syndicated programming, its weekday 7:00 a.m. and nightly 10:00 p.m. newscasts (produced by ABC-affiliated sister WKEF) and the "Fox 45" branding transferred to WKEF-DT2 on February 4, following a 33-day transition period that commenced on January 1; following the switch, the part-time MyNetworkTV/Dabl affiliation moved to WRGT's main channel. In Columbus, WTTE's Fox and syndicated programming, its weekday 7:00 a.m. and nightly 10:00 p.m. newscasts (produced by ABC-affiliated sister WSYX) and the "Fox 28" branding transferred to the third subchannel of WSYX-DT3 on February 3, following a 32-day transition period that commenced on January 1 as part of Sinclair's consolidation of Fox affiliates onto directly owned stations; afterward, WTTE switched to Sinclair's TBD diginet.	
February 3	Columbus, Ohio	WTTE	28.2	TBD	Stadium		
February 4	Dayton, Ohio	WRGT-TV	45.1	Fox	MyNetworkTV/Dabl		
February 4	Dayton, Ohio	WRGT-TV	45.2	MyNetworkTV/Dabl	TBD		
February 4	Dayton, Ohio	WRGT-TV	45.5	TBD	Stadium		
February 4	Sioux City, Iowa	KMEG	14.1	CBS	Dabl	In January 2021, Sinclair Broadcast Group—which operated the station through Waitt Broadcasting—announced that KMEG would disaffiliate from CBS after 53 years (dating to its 1967 sign-on), with its network and syndicated programming, local newscasts produced through its Siouxland News operation, as well as the "KMEG 14" branding being transferred to the DT3 subchannel of its co-owned Fox/MyNetworkTV affiliated station KPTH beginning February 4, another consolidation of Sinclair's major network affiliations onto directly owned stations. Both stations concurrently swapped their corresponding diginet affiliations with Dabl, TBD and Charge! on that date.	
February 4	Sioux City, Iowa	KMEG	14.2	TBD	Charge!		
February 4	Sioux City, Iowa	KPTH	44.2	Dabl	TBD		
February 4	Sioux City, Iowa	KPTH	44.3	Charge!	CBS		
March 29	Dallas, Texas	KTXA	21.2	MeTV	CBSN Dallas	In December 2020, Weigel Broadcasting completed its acquisition of Azteca América affiliates KAZD/Dallas and KYAZ/Houston from HC2 Holdings. On March 29, KAZD and KYAZ became MeTV owned and operation stations, as it shifts Azteca America programming to the stations' third subchannel.	
March 29	Dallas, Texas	KAZD	55.1	Azteca América	MeTV	In December 2020, Weigel Broadcasting completed its acquisition of Azteca América affiliates KAZD/Dallas and KYAZ/Houston from HC2 Holdings. On March 29, KAZD and KYAZ became MeTV owned and operation stations, as it shifts Azteca America programming to the stations' third subchannel.	
March 29	Houston, Texas	KPRC-TV	2.2	MeTV	Start TV	In December 2020, Weigel Broadcasting completed its acquisition of Azteca América affiliates KAZD/Dallas and KYAZ/Houston from HC2 Holdings. On March 29, KAZD and KYAZ became MeTV owned and operation stations, as it shifts Azteca America programming to the stations' third subchannel.	
March 29	Houston, Texas	KYAZ	51.1	Azteca América	MeTV	In December 2020, Weigel Broadcasting completed its acquisition of Azteca América affiliates KAZD/Dallas and KYAZ/Houston from HC2 Holdings. On March 29, KAZD and KYAZ became MeTV owned and operation stations, as it shifts Azteca America programming to the stations' third subchannel.	
April 1	Fresno, California	KFSN-TV	30.3	Laff	This TV	With Katz's carriage agreement with the ABC Owned Television Stations also running out, ABCOTS has since come to agreement with Allen Media Group to launch a revitalized This TV on those channel slots.	
April 1	Houston, Texas	KTRK-TV	13.3	Laff	This TV	With Katz's carriage agreement with the ABC Owned Television Stations also running out, ABCOTS has since come to agreement with Allen Media Group to launch a revitalized This TV on those channel slots.	
April 1	Los Angeles, California	KABC-TV	7.3	Laff	This TV	With Katz's carriage agreement with the ABC Owned Television Stations also running out, ABCOTS has since come to agreement with Allen Media Group to launch a revitalized This TV on those channel slots.	
April 1	New York City, New York	WABC-TV	7.3	Laff	This TV	With Katz's carriage agreement with the ABC Owned Television Stations also running out, ABCOTS has since come to agreement with Allen Media Group to launch a revitalized This TV on those channel slots.	
April 1	Philadelphia, Pennsylvania	WPVI-TV	6.3	Laff	This TV	With Katz's carriage agreement with the ABC Owned Television Stations also running out, ABCOTS has since come to agreement with Allen Media Group to launch a revitalized This TV on those channel slots.	
April 1	Raleigh, North Carolina	WTVD	11.3	Laff	This TV	With Katz's carriage agreement with the ABC Owned Television Stations also running out, ABCOTS has since come to agreement with Allen Media Group to launch a revitalized This TV on those channel slots.	
April 1	San Francisco, California	KGO-TV	7.3	Laff	This TV	With Katz's carriage agreement with the ABC Owned Television Stations also running out, ABCOTS has since come to agreement with Allen Media Group to launch a revitalized This TV on those channel slots.	
April 1	Minneapolis, Minnesota	K33LN-D	33.1	Bounce TV	QVC		
April 1	Minneapolis, Minnesota	K33LN-D	33.2	Court TV Mystery	HSN		
April 3	Las Vegas, Nevada	KLAS-TV	8.4	Ion Television	Circle		
April 5	Indianapolis, Indiana	WISH-TV	8.3	True Crime Network	Twist		
May 15	Chicago, Illinois	WCPX-TV	38.2	Court TV Mystery	Bounce TV	WCIU launched the experimental MeTV Plus service over digital subchannels 26.5 on this date; ewplaxing Bounce TV, which had been carrying its programming simultaneously on Ion O&O WCPX-TV (owned by Bounce parent, the E. W. Scripps Company) since February 28 and cedes its Chicago affiliation rights exclusively to that station with the switchover.	
May 15	Chicago, Illinois	WCIU-TV	26.5	Bounce TV	MeTV Plus	WCIU launched the experimental MeTV Plus service over digital subchannels 26.5 on this date; ewplaxing Bounce TV, which had been carrying its programming simultaneously on Ion O&O WCPX-TV (owned by Bounce parent, the E. W. Scripps Company) since February 28 and cedes its Chicago affiliation rights exclusively to that station with the switchover.	
May 17	Lexington, Kentucky	WTVQ-DT	36.4	Laff	Twist		
May 17	Lexington, Kentucky	WTVQ-DT	36.7	Grit	QVC		
June 7	Charlotte, North Carolina	WJZY	46.8	Shop LC	QVC2		
June 7	Tampa-St. Petersburg, Florida	WTSP	10.2	Antenna TV	Twist		
June 7	Tampa-St. Petersburg, Florida	WFTS-TV	28.4	Court TV	Court TV Mystery		
June 7	Tampa-St. Petersburg, Florida	WFTS-TV	28.5	QVC	HSN		
July 5	Burlington/Davenport, Iowa	KGCW	26.4	Bounce TV	CBS		
August 2	Cedar Rapids, Iowa	KCRG-TV	9.3	Antenna TV	The CW	As a result of the sale of KWWL to Allen Media Broadcasting due to the acquisition of the station's former owner Quincy Media by Gray Television, the owner of competitor KCRG-TV, The CW announced they move its affiliation from its second digital subchannel of KWWL to the third subchannel of KCRG-TV beginning August 2, after Start TV, Circle and Antenna TV diginets leaving the said station as well in the Cedar Rapids market, while the former joined the Weigel Broadcasting owned network Heroes & Icons.	
August 2	Cedar Rapids, Iowa	KWWL	7.2	The CW	Heroes & Icons		
September 1	Albany/Schenectady/Troy, New York	WXXA-TV	23.4	Bounce TV	Rewind TV		
September 1	Buffalo, New York	WNLO	23.2	Bounce TV	Rewind TV		
September 1	Buffalo, New York	WKBW-TV	7.2	Laff	Bounce TV		
September 1	Buffalo, New York	WIVB-TV	4.2	Court TV	QVC		
September 1	Charleston/Huntington, West Virginia	WOWK-TV	13.4	Grit	Rewind TV		
September 1	Charlotte, North Carolina	WJZY	46.8	QVC2	Rewind TV		
September 1	Chicago, Illinois	WGN-TV	9.4	TBD	Rewind TV		
September 1	Cleveland, Ohio	WOIO	19.4	Shop LC	Rewind TV		
September 1	Grand Rapids, Michigan	WOOD-TV	8.2	Bounce TV	Rewind TV		
September 1	Grand Rapids, Michigan	WOOD-TV	8.3	Laff	SportsGrid		
September 1	Hagerstown, Maryland	WDVM-TV	25.2	Court TV Mystery	SportsGrid		
September 1	Hagerstown, Maryland	WDVM-TV	25.3	Grit	Rewind TV		
September 1	Hagerstown, Maryland	WDVM-TV	25.4	Laff	HSN		
September 1	Harlingen, Texas	KGBT-TV	4.2	TBD	Rewind TV		
September 1	Hartford/New Haven, Connecticut	WTNH	8.2	Bounce TV	Rewind TV		
September 1	Hartford/New Haven, Connecticut	WCTX	59.2	Grit	Comet		
September 1	Honolulu, Hawaii	KHON-TV	2.4	Court TV	Rewind TV		
September 1	Nashville, Tennessee	WKRN-TV	2.2	Bounce TV	SportsGrid		
September 1	Nashville, Tennessee	WKRN-TV	2.4	Grit	Rewind TV		
September 1	New York City, New York	WPIX	11.4	TBD	Rewind TV		
September 1	Portland, Oregon	KOIN	6.3	Bounce TV	SportsGrid		
September 1	Providence, Rhode Island	WNAC-TV	64.3	Laff	Rewind TV		
September 1	Raleigh/Durham, North Carolina	WNCN	17.2	Court TV	Rewind TV		
September 1	Raleigh/Durham, North Carolina	WNCN	17.4	Court TV Mystery	Circle		
September 1	Roanoke/Lynchburg, Virginia	WWCW	21.3	Laff	Rewind TV		
September 1	Salt Lake City, Utah	KTVX	4.3	Laff	Rewind TV		
September 1	San Antonio, Texas	KABB	29.2	Comet	Rewind TV		
September 1	San Francisco, California	KRON-TV	4.3	Court TV	SportsGrid		
September 1	St. Louis, Missouri	KPLR-TV	11.4	Court TV	Rewind TV		
September 1	Scranton/Wilkes-Barre, Pennsylvania	WBRE-TV	28.3	Grit	Rewind TV		
September 1	Scranton/Wilkes-Barre, Pennsylvania	WYOU	22.3	Bounce TV	Twist		
September 1	Tampa-St. Petersburg, Florida	WFLA-TV	8.2	Court TV	SportsGrid		
September 1	Tampa-St. Petersburg, Florida	WFLA-TV	8.3	Court TV Mystery	Antenna TV		
September 20	Detroit, Michigan	WMYD	20.1	MyNetworkTV/ABC (alternate)	Independent/ABC (remained alternate)	On July 10, 2021, it was announced that Fox Corporation's MyNetworkTV programming service would move to Adell Broadcasting owned station WADL, ending its 36 years as an independent station, as well as their alternating affiliations with NBC (for programming declined to carry by the network's affiliated station in that market, WDIV-TV). Meanwhile, WMYD returns to its independence for the first time since 1995 (ending MNT's 15 year affiliation with the said station from its 2006 launch along with their 11-year affiliation with the now-defunct The WB from 1995 to 2006), while retaining their alternating affiliation with ABC (for programming declined to carry by the network's affiliated sister station in that market, WXYZ-TV due to breaking news and other programming).	
September 20	Detroit, Michigan	WADL	38.1	Independent/NBC (alternate)	MyNetworkTV		
September 20	Florence, South Carolina	WPDE-TV	15.2	24/7 weather	The CW	On September 20, 2021, the CW affiliation from WWMB (owned by Howard Stirk Holdings) moved to WPDE's second subchannel, although the "CW 21" branding was retained, continuing Sinclair's 2021 pattern of shifting major network affiliations onto directly owned stations rather than those of their shell corporations. The Weather Authority moved to the fourth subchannel, and Dabl moved from the fifth subchannel (which was dropped) to WWMB's main channel and was upgraded to high definition. Stadium moved from the fourth subchannel to WWMB's third subchannel, where it had previously been located before moving to WPDE.	
September 20	Florence, South Carolina	WPDE-TV	15.4	Stadium	24/7 weather		
September 20	Florence, South Carolina	WWMB	21.1	The CW	Dabl		
September 20	Florence, South Carolina	WWMB	21.2	The CW Plus	TBD		
September 20	Florence, South Carolina	WWMB	21.3	TBD	Stadium		
September 20	Greenville-Spartanburg-Anderson, South Carolina/Asheville, North Carolina	WMYA-TV	40.1	MyNetworkTV	Dabl	On September 20, 2021, "My 40" and the MyNetworkTV programming moved from WMYA-TV (owned by Cunningham Broadcasting) to the 13.2 subchannel of WLOS, continuing Sinclair's 2021 pattern of shifting major affiliations onto directly owned stations rather than those of their shell corporations.	
September 20	Nashville, Tennessee	WZTV	17.2	TBD	The CW	On September 14, 2021, Sinclair Broadcast Group announced that Nashville's CW affiliation (owned by Sinclair shell Tennessee Broadcasting) would move from WNAB to WZTV's 17.2 subchannel beginning September 20 at 10 a.m., using WNAB's new status as an ATSC 3.0 lighthouse station to consolidate the CW affiliation directly onto a Sinclair-owned station.	
September 20	Nashville, Tennessee	WNAB	58.1	The CW	Dabl	On September 14, 2021, Sinclair Broadcast Group announced that Nashville's CW affiliation (owned by Sinclair shell Tennessee Broadcasting) would move from WNAB to WZTV's 17.2 subchannel beginning September 20 at 10 a.m., using WNAB's new status as an ATSC 3.0 lighthouse station to consolidate the CW affiliation directly onto a Sinclair-owned station.	
September 20	Omaha, Nebraska	KXVO	15.1	The CW	TBD		
September 20	Omaha, Nebraska	KXVO	15.2	TBD	Stadium		
September 20	Omaha, Nebraska	KPTM	42.3	Comet	The CW		
September 20	San Antonio, Texas	WOAI-TV	4.2	Antenna TV	The CW	On September 20, 2021, the CW affiliation moved from Deerfield Media-owned KMYS to WOAI-TV's second subchannel (and another major affiliation consolidation onto a Sinclair-owned station), although the "CW 35" branding was retained. Dabl moved from KMYS' third subchannel to its main channel and was upgraded to high definition. TBD moved from KABB's third subchannel to KMYS' second subchannel.	
September 20	San Antonio, Texas	WOAI-TV	4.3	Charge!	Antenna TV	On September 20, 2021, the CW affiliation moved from Deerfield Media-owned KMYS to WOAI-TV's second subchannel (and another major affiliation consolidation onto a Sinclair-owned station), although the "CW 35" branding was retained. Dabl moved from KMYS' third subchannel to its main channel and was upgraded to high definition. TBD moved from KABB's third subchannel to KMYS' second subchannel.	
September 20	San Antonio, Texas	KABB	29.2	Rewind TV	Comet	On September 20, 2021, the CW affiliation moved from Deerfield Media-owned KMYS to WOAI-TV's second subchannel (and another major affiliation consolidation onto a Sinclair-owned station), although the "CW 35" branding was retained. Dabl moved from KMYS' third subchannel to its main channel and was upgraded to high definition. TBD moved from KABB's third subchannel to KMYS' second subchannel.	
September 20	San Antonio, Texas	KABB	29.3	TBD	Rewind TV	On September 20, 2021, the CW affiliation moved from Deerfield Media-owned KMYS to WOAI-TV's second subchannel (and another major affiliation consolidation onto a Sinclair-owned station), although the "CW 35" branding was retained. Dabl moved from KMYS' third subchannel to its main channel and was upgraded to high definition. TBD moved from KABB's third subchannel to KMYS' second subchannel.	
September 20	San Antonio, Texas	KMYS	35.1	The CW	Dabl	On September 20, 2021, the CW affiliation moved from Deerfield Media-owned KMYS to WOAI-TV's second subchannel (and another major affiliation consolidation onto a Sinclair-owned station), although the "CW 35" branding was retained. Dabl moved from KMYS' third subchannel to its main channel and was upgraded to high definition. TBD moved from KABB's third subchannel to KMYS' second subchannel.	
September 20	San Antonio, Texas	KMYS	35.2	Stadium	TBD	On September 20, 2021, the CW affiliation moved from Deerfield Media-owned KMYS to WOAI-TV's second subchannel (and another major affiliation consolidation onto a Sinclair-owned station), although the "CW 35" branding was retained. Dabl moved from KMYS' third subchannel to its main channel and was upgraded to high definition. TBD moved from KABB's third subchannel to KMYS' second subchannel.	
September 20	San Antonio, Texas	KMYS	35.3	Dabl	Stadium	On September 20, 2021, the CW affiliation moved from Deerfield Media-owned KMYS to WOAI-TV's second subchannel (and another major affiliation consolidation onto a Sinclair-owned station), although the "CW 35" branding was retained. Dabl moved from KMYS' third subchannel to its main channel and was upgraded to high definition. TBD moved from KABB's third subchannel to KMYS' second subchannel.	
September 20	Wichita, Kansas	KSAS	24.2	TBD	MyNetworkTV	On September 20, 2021, after 15 years of MyNetworkTV having a separate affiliated station in Wichita, MyTV Wichita programming moved from KMTW (owned by Sinclair shell Mercury Broadcasting Company) to KSAS-TV 24.2 (directly Sinclair-owned), which formerly aired programming from Sinclair's Internet-sourced network, TBD. TBD moved to KMTW 36.4, which formerly aired Dabl programming since the network's launch on September 9, 2019, and Dabl moved to 36.1.	
September 20	Wichita, Kansas	KMTW	36.1	MyNetworkTV	Dabl	On September 20, 2021, after 15 years of MyNetworkTV having a separate affiliated station in Wichita, MyTV Wichita programming moved from KMTW (owned by Sinclair shell Mercury Broadcasting Company) to KSAS-TV 24.2 (directly Sinclair-owned), which formerly aired programming from Sinclair's Internet-sourced network, TBD. TBD moved to KMTW 36.4, which formerly aired Dabl programming since the network's launch on September 9, 2019, and Dabl moved to 36.1.	
September 20	Wichita, Kansas	KMTW	36.4	Dabl	TBD	On September 20, 2021, after 15 years of MyNetworkTV having a separate affiliated station in Wichita, MyTV Wichita programming moved from KMTW (owned by Sinclair shell Mercury Broadcasting Company) to KSAS-TV 24.2 (directly Sinclair-owned), which formerly aired programming from Sinclair's Internet-sourced network, TBD. TBD moved to KMTW 36.4, which formerly aired Dabl programming since the network's launch on September 9, 2019, and Dabl moved to 36.1.	
October 31	Norfolk/Portsmouth/Newport News, Virginia	WVBT	43.3	Heroes & Icons	Rewind TV		
November 1	Las Vegas, Nevada	KLAS-TV	8.4	Circle	Rewind TV		
November 1	Richmond, Virginia	WRIC-TV	8.2	Ion Television	Rewind TV		
December 22	Cleveland, Ohio	WTCL-LP (calls changed from WLFM-LD)	6.1	Jewelry Television (WOIO/CBS simulcast in interim)	Telemundo	On September 22, 2021, Gray Television announced it would convert Jewelry Television affiliate WLFM-LD (which operated as an LPFM maintaining alternative rock/AAA and, later, Latin music formats from September 2012 until it ceased analog transmissions in June 2020) into a Telemundo affiliate, adopting the callsign WTCL-LD, effective January 1, 2022. (Cleveland—which has two existing Spanish-language major network stations, Univision/UniMás O&O WQHS-DT and Azteca América affiliate WQDI-LD—had been one of the largest U.S. markets with a significant Hispanic/Latino population that did not have a local Telemundo station.) After switching to a temporary simulcast of CBS-affiliated sister WOIO's main feed in coincidence with the October 15 callsign change, WTCL converted to Telemundo early on December 22. On January 1, WOIO began to produce twice-nightly Monday–Friday newscasts for WTCL, becoming the first Spanish-language local news offering in the Cleveland market (WQHS and WQDI, respectively, have never offered in-house or outsourced local news programming since converting into Spanish stations).	

==== Scripps, Ion, and Inyo 2021 subchannel shifts ====
Date	Market	Station	Channel	Prior affiliation	New affiliation	Notes	Source
March 1	Albany - Schenectady - Troy, New York	WYPX-TV	55.2	Qubo	Bounce TV	With the shutdown of Ion Plus, Qubo and Ion Shop and as a consequence of The E. W. Scripps Company's purchase of Ion Media (along with concurrent spin-offs of some Ion O&Os to INYO Broadcast Holdings), Ion Television's owned and affiliated stations and Ion Plus' O&O stations reconfigured their channel map to add selected networks owned by fellow Scripps subsidiary Katz Broadcasting in place of the defunct networks.	
March 1	Albany - Schenectady - Troy, New York	WYPX-TV	55.3	Ion Plus	Court TV	With the shutdown of Ion Plus, Qubo and Ion Shop and as a consequence of The E. W. Scripps Company's purchase of Ion Media (along with concurrent spin-offs of some Ion O&Os to INYO Broadcast Holdings), Ion Television's owned and affiliated stations and Ion Plus' O&O stations reconfigured their channel map to add selected networks owned by fellow Scripps subsidiary Katz Broadcasting in place of the defunct networks.	
March 1	Albany - Schenectady - Troy, New York	WYPX-TV	55.4	Ion Shop	Grit	With the shutdown of Ion Plus, Qubo and Ion Shop and as a consequence of The E. W. Scripps Company's purchase of Ion Media (along with concurrent spin-offs of some Ion O&Os to INYO Broadcast Holdings), Ion Television's owned and affiliated stations and Ion Plus' O&O stations reconfigured their channel map to add selected networks owned by fellow Scripps subsidiary Katz Broadcasting in place of the defunct networks.	
March 1	Atlanta, Georgia	WPXA-TV	14.2	Qubo	Court TV	With the shutdown of Ion Plus, Qubo and Ion Shop and as a consequence of The E. W. Scripps Company's purchase of Ion Media (along with concurrent spin-offs of some Ion O&Os to INYO Broadcast Holdings), Ion Television's owned and affiliated stations and Ion Plus' O&O stations reconfigured their channel map to add selected networks owned by fellow Scripps subsidiary Katz Broadcasting in place of the defunct networks.	
March 1	Atlanta, Georgia	WPXA-TV	14.3	Ion Plus	Laff	With the shutdown of Ion Plus, Qubo and Ion Shop and as a consequence of The E. W. Scripps Company's purchase of Ion Media (along with concurrent spin-offs of some Ion O&Os to INYO Broadcast Holdings), Ion Television's owned and affiliated stations and Ion Plus' O&O stations reconfigured their channel map to add selected networks owned by fellow Scripps subsidiary Katz Broadcasting in place of the defunct networks.	
March 1	Atlanta, Georgia	WPXA-TV	14.4	Ion Shop	Court TV Mystery	With the shutdown of Ion Plus, Qubo and Ion Shop and as a consequence of The E. W. Scripps Company's purchase of Ion Media (along with concurrent spin-offs of some Ion O&Os to INYO Broadcast Holdings), Ion Television's owned and affiliated stations and Ion Plus' O&O stations reconfigured their channel map to add selected networks owned by fellow Scripps subsidiary Katz Broadcasting in place of the defunct networks.	
March 1	Birmingham, Alabama	WPXH-TV	44.2	Qubo	Court TV Mystery	With the shutdown of Ion Plus, Qubo and Ion Shop and as a consequence of The E. W. Scripps Company's purchase of Ion Media (along with concurrent spin-offs of some Ion O&Os to INYO Broadcast Holdings), Ion Television's owned and affiliated stations and Ion Plus' O&O stations reconfigured their channel map to add selected networks owned by fellow Scripps subsidiary Katz Broadcasting in place of the defunct networks.	
March 1	Birmingham, Alabama	WPXH-TV	44.3	Ion Plus	Court TV	With the shutdown of Ion Plus, Qubo and Ion Shop and as a consequence of The E. W. Scripps Company's purchase of Ion Media (along with concurrent spin-offs of some Ion O&Os to INYO Broadcast Holdings), Ion Television's owned and affiliated stations and Ion Plus' O&O stations reconfigured their channel map to add selected networks owned by fellow Scripps subsidiary Katz Broadcasting in place of the defunct networks.	
March 1	Birmingham, Alabama	WPXH-TV	44.4	Ion Shop	Grit	With the shutdown of Ion Plus, Qubo and Ion Shop and as a consequence of The E. W. Scripps Company's purchase of Ion Media (along with concurrent spin-offs of some Ion O&Os to INYO Broadcast Holdings), Ion Television's owned and affiliated stations and Ion Plus' O&O stations reconfigured their channel map to add selected networks owned by fellow Scripps subsidiary Katz Broadcasting in place of the defunct networks.	
March 1	Birmingham, Alabama	WPXH-TV	44.5	QVC	Laff	With the shutdown of Ion Plus, Qubo and Ion Shop and as a consequence of The E. W. Scripps Company's purchase of Ion Media (along with concurrent spin-offs of some Ion O&Os to INYO Broadcast Holdings), Ion Television's owned and affiliated stations and Ion Plus' O&O stations reconfigured their channel map to add selected networks owned by fellow Scripps subsidiary Katz Broadcasting in place of the defunct networks.	
March 1	Boise, Idaho	KTRV-TV	12.2	Qubo	Court TV	With the shutdown of Ion Plus, Qubo and Ion Shop and as a consequence of The E. W. Scripps Company's purchase of Ion Media (along with concurrent spin-offs of some Ion O&Os to INYO Broadcast Holdings), Ion Television's owned and affiliated stations and Ion Plus' O&O stations reconfigured their channel map to add selected networks owned by fellow Scripps subsidiary Katz Broadcasting in place of the defunct networks.	
March 1	Boise, Idaho	KTRV-TV	12.3	Ion Plus	Grit	With the shutdown of Ion Plus, Qubo and Ion Shop and as a consequence of The E. W. Scripps Company's purchase of Ion Media (along with concurrent spin-offs of some Ion O&Os to INYO Broadcast Holdings), Ion Television's owned and affiliated stations and Ion Plus' O&O stations reconfigured their channel map to add selected networks owned by fellow Scripps subsidiary Katz Broadcasting in place of the defunct networks.	
March 1	Boise, Idaho	KTRV-TV	12.4	Ion Shop	Court TV Mystery	With the shutdown of Ion Plus, Qubo and Ion Shop and as a consequence of The E. W. Scripps Company's purchase of Ion Media (along with concurrent spin-offs of some Ion O&Os to INYO Broadcast Holdings), Ion Television's owned and affiliated stations and Ion Plus' O&O stations reconfigured their channel map to add selected networks owned by fellow Scripps subsidiary Katz Broadcasting in place of the defunct networks.	
March 1	Boston, Massachusetts	WDPX-TV	58.1	Ion Plus	Court TV	With the shutdown of Ion Plus, Qubo and Ion Shop and as a consequence of The E. W. Scripps Company's purchase of Ion Media (along with concurrent spin-offs of some Ion O&Os to INYO Broadcast Holdings), Ion Television's owned and affiliated stations and Ion Plus' O&O stations reconfigured their channel map to add selected networks owned by fellow Scripps subsidiary Katz Broadcasting in place of the defunct networks.	
March 1	Boston, Massachusetts	WBPX-TV	68.2	Qubo	Court TV Mystery	With the shutdown of Ion Plus, Qubo and Ion Shop and as a consequence of The E. W. Scripps Company's purchase of Ion Media (along with concurrent spin-offs of some Ion O&Os to INYO Broadcast Holdings), Ion Television's owned and affiliated stations and Ion Plus' O&O stations reconfigured their channel map to add selected networks owned by fellow Scripps subsidiary Katz Broadcasting in place of the defunct networks.	
March 1	Boston, Massachusetts	WBPX-TV	68.3	Ion Shop	Bounce TV	With the shutdown of Ion Plus, Qubo and Ion Shop and as a consequence of The E. W. Scripps Company's purchase of Ion Media (along with concurrent spin-offs of some Ion O&Os to INYO Broadcast Holdings), Ion Television's owned and affiliated stations and Ion Plus' O&O stations reconfigured their channel map to add selected networks owned by fellow Scripps subsidiary Katz Broadcasting in place of the defunct networks.	
March 1	Buffalo, New York	WPXJ-TV	51.2	Qubo	Court TV	With the shutdown of Ion Plus, Qubo and Ion Shop and as a consequence of The E. W. Scripps Company's purchase of Ion Media (along with concurrent spin-offs of some Ion O&Os to INYO Broadcast Holdings), Ion Television's owned and affiliated stations and Ion Plus' O&O stations reconfigured their channel map to add selected networks owned by fellow Scripps subsidiary Katz Broadcasting in place of the defunct networks.	
March 1	Buffalo, New York	WPXJ-TV	51.3	Ion Plus	Grit	With the shutdown of Ion Plus, Qubo and Ion Shop and as a consequence of The E. W. Scripps Company's purchase of Ion Media (along with concurrent spin-offs of some Ion O&Os to INYO Broadcast Holdings), Ion Television's owned and affiliated stations and Ion Plus' O&O stations reconfigured their channel map to add selected networks owned by fellow Scripps subsidiary Katz Broadcasting in place of the defunct networks.	
March 1	Buffalo, New York	WPXJ-TV	51.4	Ion Shop	Laff	With the shutdown of Ion Plus, Qubo and Ion Shop and as a consequence of The E. W. Scripps Company's purchase of Ion Media (along with concurrent spin-offs of some Ion O&Os to INYO Broadcast Holdings), Ion Television's owned and affiliated stations and Ion Plus' O&O stations reconfigured their channel map to add selected networks owned by fellow Scripps subsidiary Katz Broadcasting in place of the defunct networks.	
March 1	Chicago, Illinois	WCPX-TV	38.2	Qubo	Court TV Mystery	With the shutdown of Ion Plus, Qubo and Ion Shop and as a consequence of The E. W. Scripps Company's purchase of Ion Media (along with concurrent spin-offs of some Ion O&Os to INYO Broadcast Holdings), Ion Television's owned and affiliated stations and Ion Plus' O&O stations reconfigured their channel map to add selected networks owned by fellow Scripps subsidiary Katz Broadcasting in place of the defunct networks.	
March 1	Chicago, Illinois	WCPX-TV	38.3	Ion Plus	Court TV	With the shutdown of Ion Plus, Qubo and Ion Shop and as a consequence of The E. W. Scripps Company's purchase of Ion Media (along with concurrent spin-offs of some Ion O&Os to INYO Broadcast Holdings), Ion Television's owned and affiliated stations and Ion Plus' O&O stations reconfigured their channel map to add selected networks owned by fellow Scripps subsidiary Katz Broadcasting in place of the defunct networks.	
March 1	Chicago, Illinois	WCPX-TV	38.4	Ion Shop	Laff	With the shutdown of Ion Plus, Qubo and Ion Shop and as a consequence of The E. W. Scripps Company's purchase of Ion Media (along with concurrent spin-offs of some Ion O&Os to INYO Broadcast Holdings), Ion Television's owned and affiliated stations and Ion Plus' O&O stations reconfigured their channel map to add selected networks owned by fellow Scripps subsidiary Katz Broadcasting in place of the defunct networks.	
March 1	Cleveland, Ohio	WDLI-TV	17.1	Ion Plus	Court TV	With the shutdown of Ion Plus, Qubo and Ion Shop and as a consequence of The E. W. Scripps Company's purchase of Ion Media (along with concurrent spin-offs of some Ion O&Os to INYO Broadcast Holdings), Ion Television's owned and affiliated stations and Ion Plus' O&O stations reconfigured their channel map to add selected networks owned by fellow Scripps subsidiary Katz Broadcasting in place of the defunct networks.	
March 1	Cleveland, Ohio	WVPX-TV	23.2	Qubo	Grit	With the shutdown of Ion Plus, Qubo and Ion Shop and as a consequence of The E. W. Scripps Company's purchase of Ion Media (along with concurrent spin-offs of some Ion O&Os to INYO Broadcast Holdings), Ion Television's owned and affiliated stations and Ion Plus' O&O stations reconfigured their channel map to add selected networks owned by fellow Scripps subsidiary Katz Broadcasting in place of the defunct networks.	
March 1	Cleveland, Ohio	WVPX-TV	23.3	Ion Shop	Court TV Mystery	With the shutdown of Ion Plus, Qubo and Ion Shop and as a consequence of The E. W. Scripps Company's purchase of Ion Media (along with concurrent spin-offs of some Ion O&Os to INYO Broadcast Holdings), Ion Television's owned and affiliated stations and Ion Plus' O&O stations reconfigured their channel map to add selected networks owned by fellow Scripps subsidiary Katz Broadcasting in place of the defunct networks.	
March 1	Columbia, South Carolina	WZRB	47.2	Qubo	Court TV	With the shutdown of Ion Plus, Qubo and Ion Shop and as a consequence of The E. W. Scripps Company's purchase of Ion Media (along with concurrent spin-offs of some Ion O&Os to INYO Broadcast Holdings), Ion Television's owned and affiliated stations and Ion Plus' O&O stations reconfigured their channel map to add selected networks owned by fellow Scripps subsidiary Katz Broadcasting in place of the defunct networks.	
March 1	Columbia, South Carolina	WZRB	47.3	Ion Plus	Court TV Mystery	With the shutdown of Ion Plus, Qubo and Ion Shop and as a consequence of The E. W. Scripps Company's purchase of Ion Media (along with concurrent spin-offs of some Ion O&Os to INYO Broadcast Holdings), Ion Television's owned and affiliated stations and Ion Plus' O&O stations reconfigured their channel map to add selected networks owned by fellow Scripps subsidiary Katz Broadcasting in place of the defunct networks.	
March 1	Columbia, South Carolina	WZRB	47.4	Ion Shop	Grit	With the shutdown of Ion Plus, Qubo and Ion Shop and as a consequence of The E. W. Scripps Company's purchase of Ion Media (along with concurrent spin-offs of some Ion O&Os to INYO Broadcast Holdings), Ion Television's owned and affiliated stations and Ion Plus' O&O stations reconfigured their channel map to add selected networks owned by fellow Scripps subsidiary Katz Broadcasting in place of the defunct networks.	
March 1	Columbus, Ohio	WSFJ-TV	51.1	Ion Plus	Bounce TV	With the shutdown of Ion Plus, Qubo and Ion Shop and as a consequence of The E. W. Scripps Company's purchase of Ion Media (along with concurrent spin-offs of some Ion O&Os to INYO Broadcast Holdings), Ion Television's owned and affiliated stations and Ion Plus' O&O stations reconfigured their channel map to add selected networks owned by fellow Scripps subsidiary Katz Broadcasting in place of the defunct networks.	
March 1	Dallas - Fort Worth, Texas	KPXD-TV	68.2	Qubo	Court TV	With the shutdown of Ion Plus, Qubo and Ion Shop and as a consequence of The E. W. Scripps Company's purchase of Ion Media (along with concurrent spin-offs of some Ion O&Os to INYO Broadcast Holdings), Ion Television's owned and affiliated stations and Ion Plus' O&O stations reconfigured their channel map to add selected networks owned by fellow Scripps subsidiary Katz Broadcasting in place of the defunct networks.	
March 1	Dallas - Fort Worth, Texas	KPXD-TV	68.3	Ion Plus	Grit	With the shutdown of Ion Plus, Qubo and Ion Shop and as a consequence of The E. W. Scripps Company's purchase of Ion Media (along with concurrent spin-offs of some Ion O&Os to INYO Broadcast Holdings), Ion Television's owned and affiliated stations and Ion Plus' O&O stations reconfigured their channel map to add selected networks owned by fellow Scripps subsidiary Katz Broadcasting in place of the defunct networks.	
March 1	Dallas - Fort Worth, Texas	KPXD-TV	68.4	Ion Shop	Laff	With the shutdown of Ion Plus, Qubo and Ion Shop and as a consequence of The E. W. Scripps Company's purchase of Ion Media (along with concurrent spin-offs of some Ion O&Os to INYO Broadcast Holdings), Ion Television's owned and affiliated stations and Ion Plus' O&O stations reconfigured their channel map to add selected networks owned by fellow Scripps subsidiary Katz Broadcasting in place of the defunct networks.	
March 1	Denver, Colorado	KPXC-TV	59.2	Qubo	Bounce TV	With the shutdown of Ion Plus, Qubo and Ion Shop and as a consequence of The E. W. Scripps Company's purchase of Ion Media (along with concurrent spin-offs of some Ion O&Os to INYO Broadcast Holdings), Ion Television's owned and affiliated stations and Ion Plus' O&O stations reconfigured their channel map to add selected networks owned by fellow Scripps subsidiary Katz Broadcasting in place of the defunct networks.	
March 1	Denver, Colorado	KPXC-TV	59.3	Ion Plus	Court TV	With the shutdown of Ion Plus, Qubo and Ion Shop and as a consequence of The E. W. Scripps Company's purchase of Ion Media (along with concurrent spin-offs of some Ion O&Os to INYO Broadcast Holdings), Ion Television's owned and affiliated stations and Ion Plus' O&O stations reconfigured their channel map to add selected networks owned by fellow Scripps subsidiary Katz Broadcasting in place of the defunct networks.	
March 1	Denver, Colorado	KPXC-TV	59.4	Ion Shop	Laff	With the shutdown of Ion Plus, Qubo and Ion Shop and as a consequence of The E. W. Scripps Company's purchase of Ion Media (along with concurrent spin-offs of some Ion O&Os to INYO Broadcast Holdings), Ion Television's owned and affiliated stations and Ion Plus' O&O stations reconfigured their channel map to add selected networks owned by fellow Scripps subsidiary Katz Broadcasting in place of the defunct networks.	
March 1	Denver, Colorado	KPXC-TV	59.6	QVC	Grit	With the shutdown of Ion Plus, Qubo and Ion Shop and as a consequence of The E. W. Scripps Company's purchase of Ion Media (along with concurrent spin-offs of some Ion O&Os to INYO Broadcast Holdings), Ion Television's owned and affiliated stations and Ion Plus' O&O stations reconfigured their channel map to add selected networks owned by fellow Scripps subsidiary Katz Broadcasting in place of the defunct networks.	
March 1	Des Moines, Iowa	KFPX-TV	39.2	Qubo	Court TV	With the shutdown of Ion Plus, Qubo and Ion Shop and as a consequence of The E. W. Scripps Company's purchase of Ion Media (along with concurrent spin-offs of some Ion O&Os to INYO Broadcast Holdings), Ion Television's owned and affiliated stations and Ion Plus' O&O stations reconfigured their channel map to add selected networks owned by fellow Scripps subsidiary Katz Broadcasting in place of the defunct networks.	
March 1	Des Moines, Iowa	KFPX-TV	39.3	Ion Plus	Laff	With the shutdown of Ion Plus, Qubo and Ion Shop and as a consequence of The E. W. Scripps Company's purchase of Ion Media (along with concurrent spin-offs of some Ion O&Os to INYO Broadcast Holdings), Ion Television's owned and affiliated stations and Ion Plus' O&O stations reconfigured their channel map to add selected networks owned by fellow Scripps subsidiary Katz Broadcasting in place of the defunct networks.	
March 1	Des Moines, Iowa	KFPX-TV	39.4	Ion Shop	Court TV Mystery	With the shutdown of Ion Plus, Qubo and Ion Shop and as a consequence of The E. W. Scripps Company's purchase of Ion Media (along with concurrent spin-offs of some Ion O&Os to INYO Broadcast Holdings), Ion Television's owned and affiliated stations and Ion Plus' O&O stations reconfigured their channel map to add selected networks owned by fellow Scripps subsidiary Katz Broadcasting in place of the defunct networks.	
March 1	Detroit, Michigan	WPXD-TV	31.2	Qubo	Court TV	With the shutdown of Ion Plus, Qubo and Ion Shop and as a consequence of The E. W. Scripps Company's purchase of Ion Media (along with concurrent spin-offs of some Ion O&Os to INYO Broadcast Holdings), Ion Television's owned and affiliated stations and Ion Plus' O&O stations reconfigured their channel map to add selected networks owned by fellow Scripps subsidiary Katz Broadcasting in place of the defunct networks.	
March 1	Detroit, Michigan	WPXD-TV	31.3	Ion Plus	Grit	With the shutdown of Ion Plus, Qubo and Ion Shop and as a consequence of The E. W. Scripps Company's purchase of Ion Media (along with concurrent spin-offs of some Ion O&Os to INYO Broadcast Holdings), Ion Television's owned and affiliated stations and Ion Plus' O&O stations reconfigured their channel map to add selected networks owned by fellow Scripps subsidiary Katz Broadcasting in place of the defunct networks.	
March 1	Detroit, Michigan	WPXD-TV	31.4	Ion Shop	Court TV Mystery	With the shutdown of Ion Plus, Qubo and Ion Shop and as a consequence of The E. W. Scripps Company's purchase of Ion Media (along with concurrent spin-offs of some Ion O&Os to INYO Broadcast Holdings), Ion Television's owned and affiliated stations and Ion Plus' O&O stations reconfigured their channel map to add selected networks owned by fellow Scripps subsidiary Katz Broadcasting in place of the defunct networks.	
March 1	Grand Rapids, Michigan	WZPX-TV	43.2	Qubo	Court TV	With the shutdown of Ion Plus, Qubo and Ion Shop and as a consequence of The E. W. Scripps Company's purchase of Ion Media (along with concurrent spin-offs of some Ion O&Os to INYO Broadcast Holdings), Ion Television's owned and affiliated stations and Ion Plus' O&O stations reconfigured their channel map to add selected networks owned by fellow Scripps subsidiary Katz Broadcasting in place of the defunct networks.	
March 1	Grand Rapids, Michigan	WZPX-TV	43.3	Ion Plus	Grit	With the shutdown of Ion Plus, Qubo and Ion Shop and as a consequence of The E. W. Scripps Company's purchase of Ion Media (along with concurrent spin-offs of some Ion O&Os to INYO Broadcast Holdings), Ion Television's owned and affiliated stations and Ion Plus' O&O stations reconfigured their channel map to add selected networks owned by fellow Scripps subsidiary Katz Broadcasting in place of the defunct networks.	
March 1	Grand Rapids, Michigan	WZPX-TV	43.4	Ion Shop	Laff	With the shutdown of Ion Plus, Qubo and Ion Shop and as a consequence of The E. W. Scripps Company's purchase of Ion Media (along with concurrent spin-offs of some Ion O&Os to INYO Broadcast Holdings), Ion Television's owned and affiliated stations and Ion Plus' O&O stations reconfigured their channel map to add selected networks owned by fellow Scripps subsidiary Katz Broadcasting in place of the defunct networks.	
March 1	Grand Rapids, Michigan	WZPX-TV	43.5	QVC	Court TV Mystery	With the shutdown of Ion Plus, Qubo and Ion Shop and as a consequence of The E. W. Scripps Company's purchase of Ion Media (along with concurrent spin-offs of some Ion O&Os to INYO Broadcast Holdings), Ion Television's owned and affiliated stations and Ion Plus' O&O stations reconfigured their channel map to add selected networks owned by fellow Scripps subsidiary Katz Broadcasting in place of the defunct networks.	
March 1	Greensboro - Winston-Salem - High Point, North Carolina	WGPX-TV	16.2	Qubo	Grit	With the shutdown of Ion Plus, Qubo and Ion Shop and as a consequence of The E. W. Scripps Company's purchase of Ion Media (along with concurrent spin-offs of some Ion O&Os to INYO Broadcast Holdings), Ion Television's owned and affiliated stations and Ion Plus' O&O stations reconfigured their channel map to add selected networks owned by fellow Scripps subsidiary Katz Broadcasting in place of the defunct networks.	
March 1	Greensboro - Winston-Salem - High Point, North Carolina	WGPX-TV	16.3	Ion Plus	Court TV	With the shutdown of Ion Plus, Qubo and Ion Shop and as a consequence of The E. W. Scripps Company's purchase of Ion Media (along with concurrent spin-offs of some Ion O&Os to INYO Broadcast Holdings), Ion Television's owned and affiliated stations and Ion Plus' O&O stations reconfigured their channel map to add selected networks owned by fellow Scripps subsidiary Katz Broadcasting in place of the defunct networks.	
March 1	Greensboro - Winston-Salem - High Point, North Carolina	WGPX-TV	16.4	Ion Shop	Laff	With the shutdown of Ion Plus, Qubo and Ion Shop and as a consequence of The E. W. Scripps Company's purchase of Ion Media (along with concurrent spin-offs of some Ion O&Os to INYO Broadcast Holdings), Ion Television's owned and affiliated stations and Ion Plus' O&O stations reconfigured their channel map to add selected networks owned by fellow Scripps subsidiary Katz Broadcasting in place of the defunct networks.	
March 1	Greenville - New Bern, North Carolina	WEPX-TV	38.2	Qubo	Court TV	With the shutdown of Ion Plus, Qubo and Ion Shop and as a consequence of The E. W. Scripps Company's purchase of Ion Media (along with concurrent spin-offs of some Ion O&Os to INYO Broadcast Holdings), Ion Television's owned and affiliated stations and Ion Plus' O&O stations reconfigured their channel map to add selected networks owned by fellow Scripps subsidiary Katz Broadcasting in place of the defunct networks.	
March 1	Greenville - New Bern, North Carolina	WEPX-TV	38.3	Ion Plus	Grit	With the shutdown of Ion Plus, Qubo and Ion Shop and as a consequence of The E. W. Scripps Company's purchase of Ion Media (along with concurrent spin-offs of some Ion O&Os to INYO Broadcast Holdings), Ion Television's owned and affiliated stations and Ion Plus' O&O stations reconfigured their channel map to add selected networks owned by fellow Scripps subsidiary Katz Broadcasting in place of the defunct networks.	
March 1	Greenville - New Bern, North Carolina	WEPX-TV	38.4	Ion Shop	Laff	With the shutdown of Ion Plus, Qubo and Ion Shop and as a consequence of The E. W. Scripps Company's purchase of Ion Media (along with concurrent spin-offs of some Ion O&Os to INYO Broadcast Holdings), Ion Television's owned and affiliated stations and Ion Plus' O&O stations reconfigured their channel map to add selected networks owned by fellow Scripps subsidiary Katz Broadcasting in place of the defunct networks.	
March 1	Greenville - New Bern, North Carolina	WPXU-TV	35.2	Qubo	Court TV	With the shutdown of Ion Plus, Qubo and Ion Shop and as a consequence of The E. W. Scripps Company's purchase of Ion Media (along with concurrent spin-offs of some Ion O&Os to INYO Broadcast Holdings), Ion Television's owned and affiliated stations and Ion Plus' O&O stations reconfigured their channel map to add selected networks owned by fellow Scripps subsidiary Katz Broadcasting in place of the defunct networks.	
March 1	Greenville - New Bern, North Carolina	WPXU-TV	35.3	Ion Plus	Grit	With the shutdown of Ion Plus, Qubo and Ion Shop and as a consequence of The E. W. Scripps Company's purchase of Ion Media (along with concurrent spin-offs of some Ion O&Os to INYO Broadcast Holdings), Ion Television's owned and affiliated stations and Ion Plus' O&O stations reconfigured their channel map to add selected networks owned by fellow Scripps subsidiary Katz Broadcasting in place of the defunct networks.	
March 1	Greenville - New Bern, North Carolina	WPXU-TV	35.4	Ion Shop	Laff	With the shutdown of Ion Plus, Qubo and Ion Shop and as a consequence of The E. W. Scripps Company's purchase of Ion Media (along with concurrent spin-offs of some Ion O&Os to INYO Broadcast Holdings), Ion Television's owned and affiliated stations and Ion Plus' O&O stations reconfigured their channel map to add selected networks owned by fellow Scripps subsidiary Katz Broadcasting in place of the defunct networks.	
March 1	Hagerstown, Maryland	WWPX-TV	60.2	Qubo	Court TV Mystery	With the shutdown of Ion Plus, Qubo and Ion Shop and as a consequence of The E. W. Scripps Company's purchase of Ion Media (along with concurrent spin-offs of some Ion O&Os to INYO Broadcast Holdings), Ion Television's owned and affiliated stations and Ion Plus' O&O stations reconfigured their channel map to add selected networks owned by fellow Scripps subsidiary Katz Broadcasting in place of the defunct networks.	
March 1	Hagerstown, Maryland	WWPX-TV	60.3	Ion Plus	Court TV	With the shutdown of Ion Plus, Qubo and Ion Shop and as a consequence of The E. W. Scripps Company's purchase of Ion Media (along with concurrent spin-offs of some Ion O&Os to INYO Broadcast Holdings), Ion Television's owned and affiliated stations and Ion Plus' O&O stations reconfigured their channel map to add selected networks owned by fellow Scripps subsidiary Katz Broadcasting in place of the defunct networks.	
March 1	Hagerstown, Maryland	WWPX-TV	60.4	Ion Shop	Laff	With the shutdown of Ion Plus, Qubo and Ion Shop and as a consequence of The E. W. Scripps Company's purchase of Ion Media (along with concurrent spin-offs of some Ion O&Os to INYO Broadcast Holdings), Ion Television's owned and affiliated stations and Ion Plus' O&O stations reconfigured their channel map to add selected networks owned by fellow Scripps subsidiary Katz Broadcasting in place of the defunct networks.	
March 1	Hartford, Connecticut	WHPX-TV	26.2	Qubo	Bounce TV	With the shutdown of Ion Plus, Qubo and Ion Shop and as a consequence of The E. W. Scripps Company's purchase of Ion Media (along with concurrent spin-offs of some Ion O&Os to INYO Broadcast Holdings), Ion Television's owned and affiliated stations and Ion Plus' O&O stations reconfigured their channel map to add selected networks owned by fellow Scripps subsidiary Katz Broadcasting in place of the defunct networks.	
March 1	Hartford, Connecticut	WHPX-TV	26.3	Ion Plus	Court TV	With the shutdown of Ion Plus, Qubo and Ion Shop and as a consequence of The E. W. Scripps Company's purchase of Ion Media (along with concurrent spin-offs of some Ion O&Os to INYO Broadcast Holdings), Ion Television's owned and affiliated stations and Ion Plus' O&O stations reconfigured their channel map to add selected networks owned by fellow Scripps subsidiary Katz Broadcasting in place of the defunct networks.	
March 1	Hartford, Connecticut	WHPX-TV	26.4	Ion Shop	Grit	With the shutdown of Ion Plus, Qubo and Ion Shop and as a consequence of The E. W. Scripps Company's purchase of Ion Media (along with concurrent spin-offs of some Ion O&Os to INYO Broadcast Holdings), Ion Television's owned and affiliated stations and Ion Plus' O&O stations reconfigured their channel map to add selected networks owned by fellow Scripps subsidiary Katz Broadcasting in place of the defunct networks.	
March 1	Honolulu, Hawaii	KPXO-TV	66.2	Qubo	Court TV	With the shutdown of Ion Plus, Qubo and Ion Shop and as a consequence of The E. W. Scripps Company's purchase of Ion Media (along with concurrent spin-offs of some Ion O&Os to INYO Broadcast Holdings), Ion Television's owned and affiliated stations and Ion Plus' O&O stations reconfigured their channel map to add selected networks owned by fellow Scripps subsidiary Katz Broadcasting in place of the defunct networks.	
March 1	Honolulu, Hawaii	KPXO-TV	66.3	Ion Plus	Grit	With the shutdown of Ion Plus, Qubo and Ion Shop and as a consequence of The E. W. Scripps Company's purchase of Ion Media (along with concurrent spin-offs of some Ion O&Os to INYO Broadcast Holdings), Ion Television's owned and affiliated stations and Ion Plus' O&O stations reconfigured their channel map to add selected networks owned by fellow Scripps subsidiary Katz Broadcasting in place of the defunct networks.	
March 1	Honolulu, Hawaii	KPXO-TV	66.4	Ion Shop	Court TV Mystery	With the shutdown of Ion Plus, Qubo and Ion Shop and as a consequence of The E. W. Scripps Company's purchase of Ion Media (along with concurrent spin-offs of some Ion O&Os to INYO Broadcast Holdings), Ion Television's owned and affiliated stations and Ion Plus' O&O stations reconfigured their channel map to add selected networks owned by fellow Scripps subsidiary Katz Broadcasting in place of the defunct networks.	
March 1	Houston, Texas	KPXB-TV	49.2	Qubo	Court TV	With the shutdown of Ion Plus, Qubo and Ion Shop and as a consequence of The E. W. Scripps Company's purchase of Ion Media (along with concurrent spin-offs of some Ion O&Os to INYO Broadcast Holdings), Ion Television's owned and affiliated stations and Ion Plus' O&O stations reconfigured their channel map to add selected networks owned by fellow Scripps subsidiary Katz Broadcasting in place of the defunct networks.	
March 1	Houston, Texas	KPXB-TV	49.3	Ion Plus	Grit	With the shutdown of Ion Plus, Qubo and Ion Shop and as a consequence of The E. W. Scripps Company's purchase of Ion Media (along with concurrent spin-offs of some Ion O&Os to INYO Broadcast Holdings), Ion Television's owned and affiliated stations and Ion Plus' O&O stations reconfigured their channel map to add selected networks owned by fellow Scripps subsidiary Katz Broadcasting in place of the defunct networks.	
March 1	Houston, Texas	KPXB-TV	49.4	Ion Shop	Court TV Mystery	With the shutdown of Ion Plus, Qubo and Ion Shop and as a consequence of The E. W. Scripps Company's purchase of Ion Media (along with concurrent spin-offs of some Ion O&Os to INYO Broadcast Holdings), Ion Television's owned and affiliated stations and Ion Plus' O&O stations reconfigured their channel map to add selected networks owned by fellow Scripps subsidiary Katz Broadcasting in place of the defunct networks.	
March 1	Houston, Texas	KPXB-TV	49.5	HSN	Laff	With the shutdown of Ion Plus, Qubo and Ion Shop and as a consequence of The E. W. Scripps Company's purchase of Ion Media (along with concurrent spin-offs of some Ion O&Os to INYO Broadcast Holdings), Ion Television's owned and affiliated stations and Ion Plus' O&O stations reconfigured their channel map to add selected networks owned by fellow Scripps subsidiary Katz Broadcasting in place of the defunct networks.	
March 1	Indianapolis, Indiana	WCLJ-TV	42.1	Ion Plus	Bounce TV	With the shutdown of Ion Plus, Qubo and Ion Shop and as a consequence of The E. W. Scripps Company's purchase of Ion Media (along with concurrent spin-offs of some Ion O&Os to INYO Broadcast Holdings), Ion Television's owned and affiliated stations and Ion Plus' O&O stations reconfigured their channel map to add selected networks owned by fellow Scripps subsidiary Katz Broadcasting in place of the defunct networks.	
March 1	Indianapolis, Indiana	WIPX-TV	63.2	Qubo	Court TV	With the shutdown of Ion Plus, Qubo and Ion Shop and as a consequence of The E. W. Scripps Company's purchase of Ion Media (along with concurrent spin-offs of some Ion O&Os to INYO Broadcast Holdings), Ion Television's owned and affiliated stations and Ion Plus' O&O stations reconfigured their channel map to add selected networks owned by fellow Scripps subsidiary Katz Broadcasting in place of the defunct networks.	
March 1	Indianapolis, Indiana	WIPX-TV	63.4	Ion Shop	Court TV Mystery	With the shutdown of Ion Plus, Qubo and Ion Shop and as a consequence of The E. W. Scripps Company's purchase of Ion Media (along with concurrent spin-offs of some Ion O&Os to INYO Broadcast Holdings), Ion Television's owned and affiliated stations and Ion Plus' O&O stations reconfigured their channel map to add selected networks owned by fellow Scripps subsidiary Katz Broadcasting in place of the defunct networks.	
March 1	Indianapolis, Indiana	WRTV	6.4	Court TV Mystery	QVC	With the shutdown of Ion Plus, Qubo and Ion Shop and as a consequence of The E. W. Scripps Company's purchase of Ion Media (along with concurrent spin-offs of some Ion O&Os to INYO Broadcast Holdings), Ion Television's owned and affiliated stations and Ion Plus' O&O stations reconfigured their channel map to add selected networks owned by fellow Scripps subsidiary Katz Broadcasting in place of the defunct networks.	
March 1	Jacksonville, Florida	WPXC-TV	21.2	Qubo	Court TV	With the shutdown of Ion Plus, Qubo and Ion Shop and as a consequence of The E. W. Scripps Company's purchase of Ion Media (along with concurrent spin-offs of some Ion O&Os to INYO Broadcast Holdings), Ion Television's owned and affiliated stations and Ion Plus' O&O stations reconfigured their channel map to add selected networks owned by fellow Scripps subsidiary Katz Broadcasting in place of the defunct networks.	
March 1	Jacksonville, Florida	WPXC-TV	21.3	Ion Plus	Court TV Mystery	With the shutdown of Ion Plus, Qubo and Ion Shop and as a consequence of The E. W. Scripps Company's purchase of Ion Media (along with concurrent spin-offs of some Ion O&Os to INYO Broadcast Holdings), Ion Television's owned and affiliated stations and Ion Plus' O&O stations reconfigured their channel map to add selected networks owned by fellow Scripps subsidiary Katz Broadcasting in place of the defunct networks.	
March 1	Jacksonville, Florida	WPXC-TV	21.4	Ion Shop	Grit	With the shutdown of Ion Plus, Qubo and Ion Shop and as a consequence of The E. W. Scripps Company's purchase of Ion Media (along with concurrent spin-offs of some Ion O&Os to INYO Broadcast Holdings), Ion Television's owned and affiliated stations and Ion Plus' O&O stations reconfigured their channel map to add selected networks owned by fellow Scripps subsidiary Katz Broadcasting in place of the defunct networks.	
March 1	Jacksonville, Florida	WPXC-TV	21.6	HSN	Laff	With the shutdown of Ion Plus, Qubo and Ion Shop and as a consequence of The E. W. Scripps Company's purchase of Ion Media (along with concurrent spin-offs of some Ion O&Os to INYO Broadcast Holdings), Ion Television's owned and affiliated stations and Ion Plus' O&O stations reconfigured their channel map to add selected networks owned by fellow Scripps subsidiary Katz Broadcasting in place of the defunct networks.	
March 1	Kansas City, Missouri	KMCI-TV	38.4	Court TV	HSN	With the shutdown of Ion Plus, Qubo and Ion Shop and as a consequence of The E. W. Scripps Company's purchase of Ion Media (along with concurrent spin-offs of some Ion O&Os to INYO Broadcast Holdings), Ion Television's owned and affiliated stations and Ion Plus' O&O stations reconfigured their channel map to add selected networks owned by fellow Scripps subsidiary Katz Broadcasting in place of the defunct networks.	
March 1	Kansas City, Missouri	KPXE-TV	50.2	Qubo	Court TV	With the shutdown of Ion Plus, Qubo and Ion Shop and as a consequence of The E. W. Scripps Company's purchase of Ion Media (along with concurrent spin-offs of some Ion O&Os to INYO Broadcast Holdings), Ion Television's owned and affiliated stations and Ion Plus' O&O stations reconfigured their channel map to add selected networks owned by fellow Scripps subsidiary Katz Broadcasting in place of the defunct networks.	
March 1	Kansas City, Missouri	KPXE-TV	50.3	Ion Plus	Grit	With the shutdown of Ion Plus, Qubo and Ion Shop and as a consequence of The E. W. Scripps Company's purchase of Ion Media (along with concurrent spin-offs of some Ion O&Os to INYO Broadcast Holdings), Ion Television's owned and affiliated stations and Ion Plus' O&O stations reconfigured their channel map to add selected networks owned by fellow Scripps subsidiary Katz Broadcasting in place of the defunct networks.	
March 1	Kansas City, Missouri	KPXE-TV	50.4	Ion Shop	Laff	With the shutdown of Ion Plus, Qubo and Ion Shop and as a consequence of The E. W. Scripps Company's purchase of Ion Media (along with concurrent spin-offs of some Ion O&Os to INYO Broadcast Holdings), Ion Television's owned and affiliated stations and Ion Plus' O&O stations reconfigured their channel map to add selected networks owned by fellow Scripps subsidiary Katz Broadcasting in place of the defunct networks.	
March 1	Kansas City, Missouri	KPXE-TV	50.6	HSN	QVC2	With the shutdown of Ion Plus, Qubo and Ion Shop and as a consequence of The E. W. Scripps Company's purchase of Ion Media (along with concurrent spin-offs of some Ion O&Os to INYO Broadcast Holdings), Ion Television's owned and affiliated stations and Ion Plus' O&O stations reconfigured their channel map to add selected networks owned by fellow Scripps subsidiary Katz Broadcasting in place of the defunct networks.	
March 1	Knoxville, Tennessee	WPXK-TV	54.2	Qubo	Court TV	With the shutdown of Ion Plus, Qubo and Ion Shop and as a consequence of The E. W. Scripps Company's purchase of Ion Media (along with concurrent spin-offs of some Ion O&Os to INYO Broadcast Holdings), Ion Television's owned and affiliated stations and Ion Plus' O&O stations reconfigured their channel map to add selected networks owned by fellow Scripps subsidiary Katz Broadcasting in place of the defunct networks.	
March 1	Knoxville, Tennessee	WPXK-TV	54.3	Ion Plus	Laff	With the shutdown of Ion Plus, Qubo and Ion Shop and as a consequence of The E. W. Scripps Company's purchase of Ion Media (along with concurrent spin-offs of some Ion O&Os to INYO Broadcast Holdings), Ion Television's owned and affiliated stations and Ion Plus' O&O stations reconfigured their channel map to add selected networks owned by fellow Scripps subsidiary Katz Broadcasting in place of the defunct networks.	
March 1	Knoxville, Tennessee	WPXK-TV	54.4	Ion Shop	Court TV Mystery	With the shutdown of Ion Plus, Qubo and Ion Shop and as a consequence of The E. W. Scripps Company's purchase of Ion Media (along with concurrent spin-offs of some Ion O&Os to INYO Broadcast Holdings), Ion Television's owned and affiliated stations and Ion Plus' O&O stations reconfigured their channel map to add selected networks owned by fellow Scripps subsidiary Katz Broadcasting in place of the defunct networks.	
March 1	Lexington, Kentucky	WUPX-TV	67.2	Qubo	Court TV	With the shutdown of Ion Plus, Qubo and Ion Shop and as a consequence of The E. W. Scripps Company's purchase of Ion Media (along with concurrent spin-offs of some Ion O&Os to INYO Broadcast Holdings), Ion Television's owned and affiliated stations and Ion Plus' O&O stations reconfigured their channel map to add selected networks owned by fellow Scripps subsidiary Katz Broadcasting in place of the defunct networks.	
March 1	Lexington, Kentucky	WUPX-TV	67.3	Ion Plus	Grit	With the shutdown of Ion Plus, Qubo and Ion Shop and as a consequence of The E. W. Scripps Company's purchase of Ion Media (along with concurrent spin-offs of some Ion O&Os to INYO Broadcast Holdings), Ion Television's owned and affiliated stations and Ion Plus' O&O stations reconfigured their channel map to add selected networks owned by fellow Scripps subsidiary Katz Broadcasting in place of the defunct networks.	
March 1	Lexington, Kentucky	WUPX-TV	67.4	Ion Shop	Laff	With the shutdown of Ion Plus, Qubo and Ion Shop and as a consequence of The E. W. Scripps Company's purchase of Ion Media (along with concurrent spin-offs of some Ion O&Os to INYO Broadcast Holdings), Ion Television's owned and affiliated stations and Ion Plus' O&O stations reconfigured their channel map to add selected networks owned by fellow Scripps subsidiary Katz Broadcasting in place of the defunct networks.	
March 1	Los Angeles, California	KPXN-TV	30.2	Qubo	Court TV	With the shutdown of Ion Plus, Qubo and Ion Shop and as a consequence of The E. W. Scripps Company's purchase of Ion Media (along with concurrent spin-offs of some Ion O&Os to INYO Broadcast Holdings), Ion Television's owned and affiliated stations and Ion Plus' O&O stations reconfigured their channel map to add selected networks owned by fellow Scripps subsidiary Katz Broadcasting in place of the defunct networks.	
March 1	Los Angeles, California	KPXN-TV	30.3	Ion Life	Grit	With the shutdown of Ion Plus, Qubo and Ion Shop and as a consequence of The E. W. Scripps Company's purchase of Ion Media (along with concurrent spin-offs of some Ion O&Os to INYO Broadcast Holdings), Ion Television's owned and affiliated stations and Ion Plus' O&O stations reconfigured their channel map to add selected networks owned by fellow Scripps subsidiary Katz Broadcasting in place of the defunct networks.	
March 1	Los Angeles, California	KPXN-TV	30.4	Ion Shop	Court TV Mystery	With the shutdown of Ion Plus, Qubo and Ion Shop and as a consequence of The E. W. Scripps Company's purchase of Ion Media (along with concurrent spin-offs of some Ion O&Os to INYO Broadcast Holdings), Ion Television's owned and affiliated stations and Ion Plus' O&O stations reconfigured their channel map to add selected networks owned by fellow Scripps subsidiary Katz Broadcasting in place of the defunct networks.	
March 1	Los Angeles, California	KPXN-TV	30.5	QVC	Laff	With the shutdown of Ion Plus, Qubo and Ion Shop and as a consequence of The E. W. Scripps Company's purchase of Ion Media (along with concurrent spin-offs of some Ion O&Os to INYO Broadcast Holdings), Ion Television's owned and affiliated stations and Ion Plus' O&O stations reconfigured their channel map to add selected networks owned by fellow Scripps subsidiary Katz Broadcasting in place of the defunct networks.	
March 1	Los Angeles, California	KILM	64.1	Ion Plus	Grit	With the shutdown of Ion Plus, Qubo and Ion Shop and as a consequence of The E. W. Scripps Company's purchase of Ion Media (along with concurrent spin-offs of some Ion O&Os to INYO Broadcast Holdings), Ion Television's owned and affiliated stations and Ion Plus' O&O stations reconfigured their channel map to add selected networks owned by fellow Scripps subsidiary Katz Broadcasting in place of the defunct networks.	
March 1	Madison, Wisconsin	WIFS	57.1	Ion Plus	Ion Television	With the shutdown of Ion Plus, Qubo and Ion Shop and as a consequence of The E. W. Scripps Company's purchase of Ion Media (along with concurrent spin-offs of some Ion O&Os to INYO Broadcast Holdings), Ion Television's owned and affiliated stations and Ion Plus' O&O stations reconfigured their channel map to add selected networks owned by fellow Scripps subsidiary Katz Broadcasting in place of the defunct networks.	
March 1	Madison, Wisconsin	WIFS	57.5	Qubo	Laff	With the shutdown of Ion Plus, Qubo and Ion Shop and as a consequence of The E. W. Scripps Company's purchase of Ion Media (along with concurrent spin-offs of some Ion O&Os to INYO Broadcast Holdings), Ion Television's owned and affiliated stations and Ion Plus' O&O stations reconfigured their channel map to add selected networks owned by fellow Scripps subsidiary Katz Broadcasting in place of the defunct networks.	
March 1	Madison, Wisconsin	WIFS	57.6	Laff	Court TV Mystery	With the shutdown of Ion Plus, Qubo and Ion Shop and as a consequence of The E. W. Scripps Company's purchase of Ion Media (along with concurrent spin-offs of some Ion O&Os to INYO Broadcast Holdings), Ion Television's owned and affiliated stations and Ion Plus' O&O stations reconfigured their channel map to add selected networks owned by fellow Scripps subsidiary Katz Broadcasting in place of the defunct networks.	
March 1	Madison, Wisconsin	WIFS	57.7	Court TV Mystery	Grit	With the shutdown of Ion Plus, Qubo and Ion Shop and as a consequence of The E. W. Scripps Company's purchase of Ion Media (along with concurrent spin-offs of some Ion O&Os to INYO Broadcast Holdings), Ion Television's owned and affiliated stations and Ion Plus' O&O stations reconfigured their channel map to add selected networks owned by fellow Scripps subsidiary Katz Broadcasting in place of the defunct networks.	
March 1	Manchester, New Hampshire	WPXG-TV	21.2	Qubo	Court TV Mystery	With the shutdown of Ion Plus, Qubo and Ion Shop and as a consequence of The E. W. Scripps Company's purchase of Ion Media (along with concurrent spin-offs of some Ion O&Os to INYO Broadcast Holdings), Ion Television's owned and affiliated stations and Ion Plus' O&O stations reconfigured their channel map to add selected networks owned by fellow Scripps subsidiary Katz Broadcasting in place of the defunct networks.	
March 1	Manchester, New Hampshire	WPXG-TV	21.3	Ion Shop	Bounce TV	With the shutdown of Ion Plus, Qubo and Ion Shop and as a consequence of The E. W. Scripps Company's purchase of Ion Media (along with concurrent spin-offs of some Ion O&Os to INYO Broadcast Holdings), Ion Television's owned and affiliated stations and Ion Plus' O&O stations reconfigured their channel map to add selected networks owned by fellow Scripps subsidiary Katz Broadcasting in place of the defunct networks.	
March 1	Memphis, Tennessee	WPXX-TV	50.2	Qubo	Court TV Mystery	With the shutdown of Ion Plus, Qubo and Ion Shop and as a consequence of The E. W. Scripps Company's purchase of Ion Media (along with concurrent spin-offs of some Ion O&Os to INYO Broadcast Holdings), Ion Television's owned and affiliated stations and Ion Plus' O&O stations reconfigured their channel map to add selected networks owned by fellow Scripps subsidiary Katz Broadcasting in place of the defunct networks.	
March 1	Memphis, Tennessee	WPXX-TV	50.3	Ion Plus	Court TV	With the shutdown of Ion Plus, Qubo and Ion Shop and as a consequence of The E. W. Scripps Company's purchase of Ion Media (along with concurrent spin-offs of some Ion O&Os to INYO Broadcast Holdings), Ion Television's owned and affiliated stations and Ion Plus' O&O stations reconfigured their channel map to add selected networks owned by fellow Scripps subsidiary Katz Broadcasting in place of the defunct networks.	
March 1	Memphis, Tennessee	WPXX-TV	50.4	Ion Shop	Grit	With the shutdown of Ion Plus, Qubo and Ion Shop and as a consequence of The E. W. Scripps Company's purchase of Ion Media (along with concurrent spin-offs of some Ion O&Os to INYO Broadcast Holdings), Ion Television's owned and affiliated stations and Ion Plus' O&O stations reconfigured their channel map to add selected networks owned by fellow Scripps subsidiary Katz Broadcasting in place of the defunct networks.	
March 1	Miami - Ft. Lauderdale, Florida	WPXM-TV	35.2	Qubo	Court TV Mystery	With the shutdown of Ion Plus, Qubo and Ion Shop and as a consequence of The E. W. Scripps Company's purchase of Ion Media (along with concurrent spin-offs of some Ion O&Os to INYO Broadcast Holdings), Ion Television's owned and affiliated stations and Ion Plus' O&O stations reconfigured their channel map to add selected networks owned by fellow Scripps subsidiary Katz Broadcasting in place of the defunct networks.	
March 1	Miami - Ft. Lauderdale, Florida	WPXM-TV	35.3	Ion Plus	Grit	With the shutdown of Ion Plus, Qubo and Ion Shop and as a consequence of The E. W. Scripps Company's purchase of Ion Media (along with concurrent spin-offs of some Ion O&Os to INYO Broadcast Holdings), Ion Television's owned and affiliated stations and Ion Plus' O&O stations reconfigured their channel map to add selected networks owned by fellow Scripps subsidiary Katz Broadcasting in place of the defunct networks.	
March 1	Miami - Ft. Lauderdale, Florida	WPXM-TV	35.4	Ion Shop	Laff	With the shutdown of Ion Plus, Qubo and Ion Shop and as a consequence of The E. W. Scripps Company's purchase of Ion Media (along with concurrent spin-offs of some Ion O&Os to INYO Broadcast Holdings), Ion Television's owned and affiliated stations and Ion Plus' O&O stations reconfigured their channel map to add selected networks owned by fellow Scripps subsidiary Katz Broadcasting in place of the defunct networks.	
March 1	Milwaukee, Wisconsin	WPXE-TV	55.2	Qubo	Bounce TV	With the shutdown of Ion Plus, Qubo and Ion Shop and as a consequence of The E. W. Scripps Company's purchase of Ion Media (along with concurrent spin-offs of some Ion O&Os to INYO Broadcast Holdings), Ion Television's owned and affiliated stations and Ion Plus' O&O stations reconfigured their channel map to add selected networks owned by fellow Scripps subsidiary Katz Broadcasting in place of the defunct networks.	
March 1	Milwaukee, Wisconsin	WPXE-TV	55.3	Ion Plus	Court TV	With the shutdown of Ion Plus, Qubo and Ion Shop and as a consequence of The E. W. Scripps Company's purchase of Ion Media (along with concurrent spin-offs of some Ion O&Os to INYO Broadcast Holdings), Ion Television's owned and affiliated stations and Ion Plus' O&O stations reconfigured their channel map to add selected networks owned by fellow Scripps subsidiary Katz Broadcasting in place of the defunct networks.	
March 1	Milwaukee, Wisconsin	WPXE-TV	55.4	Ion Shop	Grit	With the shutdown of Ion Plus, Qubo and Ion Shop and as a consequence of The E. W. Scripps Company's purchase of Ion Media (along with concurrent spin-offs of some Ion O&Os to INYO Broadcast Holdings), Ion Television's owned and affiliated stations and Ion Plus' O&O stations reconfigured their channel map to add selected networks owned by fellow Scripps subsidiary Katz Broadcasting in place of the defunct networks.	
March 1	Minneapolis - St. Paul, Minnesota	KPXM-TV	41.2	Qubo	Bounce TV	With the shutdown of Ion Plus, Qubo and Ion Shop and as a consequence of The E. W. Scripps Company's purchase of Ion Media (along with concurrent spin-offs of some Ion O&Os to INYO Broadcast Holdings), Ion Television's owned and affiliated stations and Ion Plus' O&O stations reconfigured their channel map to add selected networks owned by fellow Scripps subsidiary Katz Broadcasting in place of the defunct networks.	
March 1	Minneapolis - St. Paul, Minnesota	KPXM-TV	41.3	Ion Plus	Grit	With the shutdown of Ion Plus, Qubo and Ion Shop and as a consequence of The E. W. Scripps Company's purchase of Ion Media (along with concurrent spin-offs of some Ion O&Os to INYO Broadcast Holdings), Ion Television's owned and affiliated stations and Ion Plus' O&O stations reconfigured their channel map to add selected networks owned by fellow Scripps subsidiary Katz Broadcasting in place of the defunct networks.	
March 1	Minneapolis - St. Paul, Minnesota	KPXM-TV	41.4	Ion Shop	Court TV Mystery	With the shutdown of Ion Plus, Qubo and Ion Shop and as a consequence of The E. W. Scripps Company's purchase of Ion Media (along with concurrent spin-offs of some Ion O&Os to INYO Broadcast Holdings), Ion Television's owned and affiliated stations and Ion Plus' O&O stations reconfigured their channel map to add selected networks owned by fellow Scripps subsidiary Katz Broadcasting in place of the defunct networks.	
March 1	Nashville, Tennessee	WNPX-TV	28.2	Qubo	Court TV	With the shutdown of Ion Plus, Qubo and Ion Shop and as a consequence of The E. W. Scripps Company's purchase of Ion Media (along with concurrent spin-offs of some Ion O&Os to INYO Broadcast Holdings), Ion Television's owned and affiliated stations and Ion Plus' O&O stations reconfigured their channel map to add selected networks owned by fellow Scripps subsidiary Katz Broadcasting in place of the defunct networks.	
March 1	Nashville, Tennessee	WNPX-TV	28.3	Ion Plus	Grit	With the shutdown of Ion Plus, Qubo and Ion Shop and as a consequence of The E. W. Scripps Company's purchase of Ion Media (along with concurrent spin-offs of some Ion O&Os to INYO Broadcast Holdings), Ion Television's owned and affiliated stations and Ion Plus' O&O stations reconfigured their channel map to add selected networks owned by fellow Scripps subsidiary Katz Broadcasting in place of the defunct networks.	
March 1	Nashville, Tennessee	WNPX-TV	28.4	Ion Shop	Laff	With the shutdown of Ion Plus, Qubo and Ion Shop and as a consequence of The E. W. Scripps Company's purchase of Ion Media (along with concurrent spin-offs of some Ion O&Os to INYO Broadcast Holdings), Ion Television's owned and affiliated stations and Ion Plus' O&O stations reconfigured their channel map to add selected networks owned by fellow Scripps subsidiary Katz Broadcasting in place of the defunct networks.	
March 1	New Orleans, Louisiana	WPXL-TV	49.2	Qubo	Grit	With the shutdown of Ion Plus, Qubo and Ion Shop and as a consequence of The E. W. Scripps Company's purchase of Ion Media (along with concurrent spin-offs of some Ion O&Os to INYO Broadcast Holdings), Ion Television's owned and affiliated stations and Ion Plus' O&O stations reconfigured their channel map to add selected networks owned by fellow Scripps subsidiary Katz Broadcasting in place of the defunct networks.	
March 1	New Orleans, Louisiana	WPXL-TV	49.3	Ion Plus	Laff	With the shutdown of Ion Plus, Qubo and Ion Shop and as a consequence of The E. W. Scripps Company's purchase of Ion Media (along with concurrent spin-offs of some Ion O&Os to INYO Broadcast Holdings), Ion Television's owned and affiliated stations and Ion Plus' O&O stations reconfigured their channel map to add selected networks owned by fellow Scripps subsidiary Katz Broadcasting in place of the defunct networks.	
March 1	New Orleans, Louisiana	WPXL-TV	49.4	Ion Shop	Court TV Mystery	With the shutdown of Ion Plus, Qubo and Ion Shop and as a consequence of The E. W. Scripps Company's purchase of Ion Media (along with concurrent spin-offs of some Ion O&Os to INYO Broadcast Holdings), Ion Television's owned and affiliated stations and Ion Plus' O&O stations reconfigured their channel map to add selected networks owned by fellow Scripps subsidiary Katz Broadcasting in place of the defunct networks.	
March 1	New York City, New York	WJLP	33.6	Court TV	Heartland	With the shutdown of Ion Plus, Qubo and Ion Shop and as a consequence of The E. W. Scripps Company's purchase of Ion Media (along with concurrent spin-offs of some Ion O&Os to INYO Broadcast Holdings), Ion Television's owned and affiliated stations and Ion Plus' O&O stations reconfigured their channel map to add selected networks owned by fellow Scripps subsidiary Katz Broadcasting in place of the defunct networks.	
March 1	New York City, New York	WPXN-TV	31.2	Qubo	Grit	With the shutdown of Ion Plus, Qubo and Ion Shop and as a consequence of The E. W. Scripps Company's purchase of Ion Media (along with concurrent spin-offs of some Ion O&Os to INYO Broadcast Holdings), Ion Television's owned and affiliated stations and Ion Plus' O&O stations reconfigured their channel map to add selected networks owned by fellow Scripps subsidiary Katz Broadcasting in place of the defunct networks.	
March 1	New York City, New York	WPXN-TV	31.3	Ion Plus	Court TV Mystery	With the shutdown of Ion Plus, Qubo and Ion Shop and as a consequence of The E. W. Scripps Company's purchase of Ion Media (along with concurrent spin-offs of some Ion O&Os to INYO Broadcast Holdings), Ion Television's owned and affiliated stations and Ion Plus' O&O stations reconfigured their channel map to add selected networks owned by fellow Scripps subsidiary Katz Broadcasting in place of the defunct networks.	
March 1	New York City, New York	WPXN-TV	31.4	Ion Shop	Court TV	With the shutdown of Ion Plus, Qubo and Ion Shop and as a consequence of The E. W. Scripps Company's purchase of Ion Media (along with concurrent spin-offs of some Ion O&Os to INYO Broadcast Holdings), Ion Television's owned and affiliated stations and Ion Plus' O&O stations reconfigured their channel map to add selected networks owned by fellow Scripps subsidiary Katz Broadcasting in place of the defunct networks.	
March 1	New York City, New York	WPXN-TV	31.5	QVC	Laff	With the shutdown of Ion Plus, Qubo and Ion Shop and as a consequence of The E. W. Scripps Company's purchase of Ion Media (along with concurrent spin-offs of some Ion O&Os to INYO Broadcast Holdings), Ion Television's owned and affiliated stations and Ion Plus' O&O stations reconfigured their channel map to add selected networks owned by fellow Scripps subsidiary Katz Broadcasting in place of the defunct networks.	
March 1	Norfolk - Portsmouth - Newport News, Virginia	WPXV-TV	49.2	Qubo	Laff	With the shutdown of Ion Plus, Qubo and Ion Shop and as a consequence of The E. W. Scripps Company's purchase of Ion Media (along with concurrent spin-offs of some Ion O&Os to INYO Broadcast Holdings), Ion Television's owned and affiliated stations and Ion Plus' O&O stations reconfigured their channel map to add selected networks owned by fellow Scripps subsidiary Katz Broadcasting in place of the defunct networks.	
March 1	Norfolk - Portsmouth - Newport News, Virginia	WPXV-TV	49.3	Ion Plus	Court TV Mystery	With the shutdown of Ion Plus, Qubo and Ion Shop and as a consequence of The E. W. Scripps Company's purchase of Ion Media (along with concurrent spin-offs of some Ion O&Os to INYO Broadcast Holdings), Ion Television's owned and affiliated stations and Ion Plus' O&O stations reconfigured their channel map to add selected networks owned by fellow Scripps subsidiary Katz Broadcasting in place of the defunct networks.	
March 1	Norfolk - Portsmouth - Newport News, Virginia	WPXV-TV	49.4	Ion Shop	Court TV	With the shutdown of Ion Plus, Qubo and Ion Shop and as a consequence of The E. W. Scripps Company's purchase of Ion Media (along with concurrent spin-offs of some Ion O&Os to INYO Broadcast Holdings), Ion Television's owned and affiliated stations and Ion Plus' O&O stations reconfigured their channel map to add selected networks owned by fellow Scripps subsidiary Katz Broadcasting in place of the defunct networks.	
March 1	Norfolk - Portsmouth - Newport News, Virginia	WGNT	27.4	Court TV	Dabl	With the shutdown of Ion Plus, Qubo and Ion Shop and as a consequence of The E. W. Scripps Company's purchase of Ion Media (along with concurrent spin-offs of some Ion O&Os to INYO Broadcast Holdings), Ion Television's owned and affiliated stations and Ion Plus' O&O stations reconfigured their channel map to add selected networks owned by fellow Scripps subsidiary Katz Broadcasting in place of the defunct networks.	
March 1	Oklahoma City, Oklahoma	KOPX-TV	62.2	Qubo	Bounce TV	With the shutdown of Ion Plus, Qubo and Ion Shop and as a consequence of The E. W. Scripps Company's purchase of Ion Media (along with concurrent spin-offs of some Ion O&Os to INYO Broadcast Holdings), Ion Television's owned and affiliated stations and Ion Plus' O&O stations reconfigured their channel map to add selected networks owned by fellow Scripps subsidiary Katz Broadcasting in place of the defunct networks.	
March 1	Oklahoma City, Oklahoma	KOPX-TV	62.3	Ion Plus	Court TV	With the shutdown of Ion Plus, Qubo and Ion Shop and as a consequence of The E. W. Scripps Company's purchase of Ion Media (along with concurrent spin-offs of some Ion O&Os to INYO Broadcast Holdings), Ion Television's owned and affiliated stations and Ion Plus' O&O stations reconfigured their channel map to add selected networks owned by fellow Scripps subsidiary Katz Broadcasting in place of the defunct networks.	
March 1	Oklahoma City, Oklahoma	KOPX-TV	62.4	Ion Shop	Grit	With the shutdown of Ion Plus, Qubo and Ion Shop and as a consequence of The E. W. Scripps Company's purchase of Ion Media (along with concurrent spin-offs of some Ion O&Os to INYO Broadcast Holdings), Ion Television's owned and affiliated stations and Ion Plus' O&O stations reconfigured their channel map to add selected networks owned by fellow Scripps subsidiary Katz Broadcasting in place of the defunct networks.	
March 1	Orlando, Florida	WOPX-TV	56.2	Qubo	Bounce TV	With the shutdown of Ion Plus, Qubo and Ion Shop and as a consequence of The E. W. Scripps Company's purchase of Ion Media (along with concurrent spin-offs of some Ion O&Os to INYO Broadcast Holdings), Ion Television's owned and affiliated stations and Ion Plus' O&O stations reconfigured their channel map to add selected networks owned by fellow Scripps subsidiary Katz Broadcasting in place of the defunct networks.	
March 1	Orlando, Florida	WOPX-TV	56.3	Ion Plus	Court TV Mystery	With the shutdown of Ion Plus, Qubo and Ion Shop and as a consequence of The E. W. Scripps Company's purchase of Ion Media (along with concurrent spin-offs of some Ion O&Os to INYO Broadcast Holdings), Ion Television's owned and affiliated stations and Ion Plus' O&O stations reconfigured their channel map to add selected networks owned by fellow Scripps subsidiary Katz Broadcasting in place of the defunct networks.	
March 1	Orlando, Florida	WOPX-TV	56.4	Ion Shop	Grit	With the shutdown of Ion Plus, Qubo and Ion Shop and as a consequence of The E. W. Scripps Company's purchase of Ion Media (along with concurrent spin-offs of some Ion O&Os to INYO Broadcast Holdings), Ion Television's owned and affiliated stations and Ion Plus' O&O stations reconfigured their channel map to add selected networks owned by fellow Scripps subsidiary Katz Broadcasting in place of the defunct networks.	
March 1	Philadelphia, Pennsylvania	WPPX-TV	61.2	Qubo	Court TV	With the shutdown of Ion Plus, Qubo and Ion Shop and as a consequence of The E. W. Scripps Company's purchase of Ion Media (along with concurrent spin-offs of some Ion O&Os to INYO Broadcast Holdings), Ion Television's owned and affiliated stations and Ion Plus' O&O stations reconfigured their channel map to add selected networks owned by fellow Scripps subsidiary Katz Broadcasting in place of the defunct networks.	
March 1	Philadelphia, Pennsylvania	WPPX-TV	61.3	Ion Plus	Grit	With the shutdown of Ion Plus, Qubo and Ion Shop and as a consequence of The E. W. Scripps Company's purchase of Ion Media (along with concurrent spin-offs of some Ion O&Os to INYO Broadcast Holdings), Ion Television's owned and affiliated stations and Ion Plus' O&O stations reconfigured their channel map to add selected networks owned by fellow Scripps subsidiary Katz Broadcasting in place of the defunct networks.	
March 1	Philadelphia, Pennsylvania	WPPX-TV	61.4	Ion Shop	Court TV Mystery	With the shutdown of Ion Plus, Qubo and Ion Shop and as a consequence of The E. W. Scripps Company's purchase of Ion Media (along with concurrent spin-offs of some Ion O&Os to INYO Broadcast Holdings), Ion Television's owned and affiliated stations and Ion Plus' O&O stations reconfigured their channel map to add selected networks owned by fellow Scripps subsidiary Katz Broadcasting in place of the defunct networks.	
March 1	Philadelphia, Pennsylvania	WPPX-TV	61.5	HSN	Laff	With the shutdown of Ion Plus, Qubo and Ion Shop and as a consequence of The E. W. Scripps Company's purchase of Ion Media (along with concurrent spin-offs of some Ion O&Os to INYO Broadcast Holdings), Ion Television's owned and affiliated stations and Ion Plus' O&O stations reconfigured their channel map to add selected networks owned by fellow Scripps subsidiary Katz Broadcasting in place of the defunct networks.	
March 1	Pittsburgh, Pennsylvania	WINP-TV	16.2	Qubo	Bounce TV	With the shutdown of Ion Plus, Qubo and Ion Shop and as a consequence of The E. W. Scripps Company's purchase of Ion Media (along with concurrent spin-offs of some Ion O&Os to INYO Broadcast Holdings), Ion Television's owned and affiliated stations and Ion Plus' O&O stations reconfigured their channel map to add selected networks owned by fellow Scripps subsidiary Katz Broadcasting in place of the defunct networks.	
March 1	Pittsburgh, Pennsylvania	WINP-TV	16.3	Ion Plus	Court TV	With the shutdown of Ion Plus, Qubo and Ion Shop and as a consequence of The E. W. Scripps Company's purchase of Ion Media (along with concurrent spin-offs of some Ion O&Os to INYO Broadcast Holdings), Ion Television's owned and affiliated stations and Ion Plus' O&O stations reconfigured their channel map to add selected networks owned by fellow Scripps subsidiary Katz Broadcasting in place of the defunct networks.	
March 1	Pittsburgh, Pennsylvania	WINP-TV	16.4	Ion Shop	Court TV Mystery	With the shutdown of Ion Plus, Qubo and Ion Shop and as a consequence of The E. W. Scripps Company's purchase of Ion Media (along with concurrent spin-offs of some Ion O&Os to INYO Broadcast Holdings), Ion Television's owned and affiliated stations and Ion Plus' O&O stations reconfigured their channel map to add selected networks owned by fellow Scripps subsidiary Katz Broadcasting in place of the defunct networks.	
March 1	Portland, Maine	WIPL	35.2	Qubo	Court TV	With the shutdown of Ion Plus, Qubo and Ion Shop and as a consequence of The E. W. Scripps Company's purchase of Ion Media (along with concurrent spin-offs of some Ion O&Os to INYO Broadcast Holdings), Ion Television's owned and affiliated stations and Ion Plus' O&O stations reconfigured their channel map to add selected networks owned by fellow Scripps subsidiary Katz Broadcasting in place of the defunct networks.	
March 1	Portland, Maine	WIPL	35.3	Ion Plus	Bounce TV	With the shutdown of Ion Plus, Qubo and Ion Shop and as a consequence of The E. W. Scripps Company's purchase of Ion Media (along with concurrent spin-offs of some Ion O&Os to INYO Broadcast Holdings), Ion Television's owned and affiliated stations and Ion Plus' O&O stations reconfigured their channel map to add selected networks owned by fellow Scripps subsidiary Katz Broadcasting in place of the defunct networks.	
March 1	Portland, Maine	WIPL	35.4	Ion Shop	Grit	With the shutdown of Ion Plus, Qubo and Ion Shop and as a consequence of The E. W. Scripps Company's purchase of Ion Media (along with concurrent spin-offs of some Ion O&Os to INYO Broadcast Holdings), Ion Television's owned and affiliated stations and Ion Plus' O&O stations reconfigured their channel map to add selected networks owned by fellow Scripps subsidiary Katz Broadcasting in place of the defunct networks.	
March 1	Portland, Maine	WCSH	6.3	Court TV	Antenna TV	With the shutdown of Ion Plus, Qubo and Ion Shop and as a consequence of The E. W. Scripps Company's purchase of Ion Media (along with concurrent spin-offs of some Ion O&Os to INYO Broadcast Holdings), Ion Television's owned and affiliated stations and Ion Plus' O&O stations reconfigured their channel map to add selected networks owned by fellow Scripps subsidiary Katz Broadcasting in place of the defunct networks.	
March 1	Portland, Oregon	KPXG-TV	22.2	Qubo	Bounce TV	With the shutdown of Ion Plus, Qubo and Ion Shop and as a consequence of The E. W. Scripps Company's purchase of Ion Media (along with concurrent spin-offs of some Ion O&Os to INYO Broadcast Holdings), Ion Television's owned and affiliated stations and Ion Plus' O&O stations reconfigured their channel map to add selected networks owned by fellow Scripps subsidiary Katz Broadcasting in place of the defunct networks.	
March 1	Portland, Oregon	KPXG-TV	22.3	Qubo	Court TV	With the shutdown of Ion Plus, Qubo and Ion Shop and as a consequence of The E. W. Scripps Company's purchase of Ion Media (along with concurrent spin-offs of some Ion O&Os to INYO Broadcast Holdings), Ion Television's owned and affiliated stations and Ion Plus' O&O stations reconfigured their channel map to add selected networks owned by fellow Scripps subsidiary Katz Broadcasting in place of the defunct networks.	
March 1	Portland, Oregon	KPXG-TV	22.4	Ion Shop	Laff	With the shutdown of Ion Plus, Qubo and Ion Shop and as a consequence of The E. W. Scripps Company's purchase of Ion Media (along with concurrent spin-offs of some Ion O&Os to INYO Broadcast Holdings), Ion Television's owned and affiliated stations and Ion Plus' O&O stations reconfigured their channel map to add selected networks owned by fellow Scripps subsidiary Katz Broadcasting in place of the defunct networks.	
March 1	Providence, Rhode Island	WLWC	28.1	Ion Plus	Court TV	With the shutdown of Ion Plus, Qubo and Ion Shop and as a consequence of The E. W. Scripps Company's purchase of Ion Media (along with concurrent spin-offs of some Ion O&Os to INYO Broadcast Holdings), Ion Television's owned and affiliated stations and Ion Plus' O&O stations reconfigured their channel map to add selected networks owned by fellow Scripps subsidiary Katz Broadcasting in place of the defunct networks.	
March 1	Providence, Rhode Island	WPXQ-TV	69.2	Qubo	Laff	With the shutdown of Ion Plus, Qubo and Ion Shop and as a consequence of The E. W. Scripps Company's purchase of Ion Media (along with concurrent spin-offs of some Ion O&Os to INYO Broadcast Holdings), Ion Television's owned and affiliated stations and Ion Plus' O&O stations reconfigured their channel map to add selected networks owned by fellow Scripps subsidiary Katz Broadcasting in place of the defunct networks.	
March 1	Providence, Rhode Island	WPXQ-TV	69.4	Ion Shop	Bounce TV	With the shutdown of Ion Plus, Qubo and Ion Shop and as a consequence of The E. W. Scripps Company's purchase of Ion Media (along with concurrent spin-offs of some Ion O&Os to INYO Broadcast Holdings), Ion Television's owned and affiliated stations and Ion Plus' O&O stations reconfigured their channel map to add selected networks owned by fellow Scripps subsidiary Katz Broadcasting in place of the defunct networks.	
March 1	Raleigh - Durham, North Carolina	WRPX-TV	47.3	Ion Shop	Court TV Mystery	With the shutdown of Ion Plus, Qubo and Ion Shop and as a consequence of The E. W. Scripps Company's purchase of Ion Media (along with concurrent spin-offs of some Ion O&Os to INYO Broadcast Holdings), Ion Television's owned and affiliated stations and Ion Plus' O&O stations reconfigured their channel map to add selected networks owned by fellow Scripps subsidiary Katz Broadcasting in place of the defunct networks.	
March 1	Raleigh - Durham, North Carolina	WRPX-TV	47.5	QVC	Laff	With the shutdown of Ion Plus, Qubo and Ion Shop and as a consequence of The E. W. Scripps Company's purchase of Ion Media (along with concurrent spin-offs of some Ion O&Os to INYO Broadcast Holdings), Ion Television's owned and affiliated stations and Ion Plus' O&O stations reconfigured their channel map to add selected networks owned by fellow Scripps subsidiary Katz Broadcasting in place of the defunct networks.	
March 1	Raleigh - Durham, North Carolina	WFPX-TV	62.1	Ion Plus	Court TV	With the shutdown of Ion Plus, Qubo and Ion Shop and as a consequence of The E. W. Scripps Company's purchase of Ion Media (along with concurrent spin-offs of some Ion O&Os to INYO Broadcast Holdings), Ion Television's owned and affiliated stations and Ion Plus' O&O stations reconfigured their channel map to add selected networks owned by fellow Scripps subsidiary Katz Broadcasting in place of the defunct networks.	
March 1	Roanoke - Lynchburg, Virginia	WPXR-TV	38.2	Qubo	Court TV	With the shutdown of Ion Plus, Qubo and Ion Shop and as a consequence of The E. W. Scripps Company's purchase of Ion Media (along with concurrent spin-offs of some Ion O&Os to INYO Broadcast Holdings), Ion Television's owned and affiliated stations and Ion Plus' O&O stations reconfigured their channel map to add selected networks owned by fellow Scripps subsidiary Katz Broadcasting in place of the defunct networks.	
March 1	Roanoke - Lynchburg, Virginia	WPXR-TV	38.3	Ion Plus	Laff	With the shutdown of Ion Plus, Qubo and Ion Shop and as a consequence of The E. W. Scripps Company's purchase of Ion Media (along with concurrent spin-offs of some Ion O&Os to INYO Broadcast Holdings), Ion Television's owned and affiliated stations and Ion Plus' O&O stations reconfigured their channel map to add selected networks owned by fellow Scripps subsidiary Katz Broadcasting in place of the defunct networks.	
March 1	Roanoke - Lynchburg, Virginia	WPXR-TV	38.4	Ion Shop	Court TV Mystery	With the shutdown of Ion Plus, Qubo and Ion Shop and as a consequence of The E. W. Scripps Company's purchase of Ion Media (along with concurrent spin-offs of some Ion O&Os to INYO Broadcast Holdings), Ion Television's owned and affiliated stations and Ion Plus' O&O stations reconfigured their channel map to add selected networks owned by fellow Scripps subsidiary Katz Broadcasting in place of the defunct networks.	
March 1	St. Louis, Missouri	WRBU	46.2	Qubo	Court TV	With the shutdown of Ion Plus, Qubo and Ion Shop and as a consequence of The E. W. Scripps Company's purchase of Ion Media (along with concurrent spin-offs of some Ion O&Os to INYO Broadcast Holdings), Ion Television's owned and affiliated stations and Ion Plus' O&O stations reconfigured their channel map to add selected networks owned by fellow Scripps subsidiary Katz Broadcasting in place of the defunct networks.	
March 1	St. Louis, Missouri	WRBU	46.3	Ion Plus	Grit	With the shutdown of Ion Plus, Qubo and Ion Shop and as a consequence of The E. W. Scripps Company's purchase of Ion Media (along with concurrent spin-offs of some Ion O&Os to INYO Broadcast Holdings), Ion Television's owned and affiliated stations and Ion Plus' O&O stations reconfigured their channel map to add selected networks owned by fellow Scripps subsidiary Katz Broadcasting in place of the defunct networks.	
March 1	St. Louis, Missouri	WRBU	46.4	Ion Shop	Laff	With the shutdown of Ion Plus, Qubo and Ion Shop and as a consequence of The E. W. Scripps Company's purchase of Ion Media (along with concurrent spin-offs of some Ion O&Os to INYO Broadcast Holdings), Ion Television's owned and affiliated stations and Ion Plus' O&O stations reconfigured their channel map to add selected networks owned by fellow Scripps subsidiary Katz Broadcasting in place of the defunct networks.	
March 1	Sacramento, California	KSPX-TV	29.2	Qubo	Court TV	With the shutdown of Ion Plus, Qubo and Ion Shop and as a consequence of The E. W. Scripps Company's purchase of Ion Media (along with concurrent spin-offs of some Ion O&Os to INYO Broadcast Holdings), Ion Television's owned and affiliated stations and Ion Plus' O&O stations reconfigured their channel map to add selected networks owned by fellow Scripps subsidiary Katz Broadcasting in place of the defunct networks.	
March 1	Sacramento, California	KSPX-TV	29.3	Ion Plus	Laff	With the shutdown of Ion Plus, Qubo and Ion Shop and as a consequence of The E. W. Scripps Company's purchase of Ion Media (along with concurrent spin-offs of some Ion O&Os to INYO Broadcast Holdings), Ion Television's owned and affiliated stations and Ion Plus' O&O stations reconfigured their channel map to add selected networks owned by fellow Scripps subsidiary Katz Broadcasting in place of the defunct networks.	
March 1	Sacramento, California	KSPX-TV	29.4	Ion Shop	Bounce TV	With the shutdown of Ion Plus, Qubo and Ion Shop and as a consequence of The E. W. Scripps Company's purchase of Ion Media (along with concurrent spin-offs of some Ion O&Os to INYO Broadcast Holdings), Ion Television's owned and affiliated stations and Ion Plus' O&O stations reconfigured their channel map to add selected networks owned by fellow Scripps subsidiary Katz Broadcasting in place of the defunct networks.	
March 1	Salt Lake City, Utah	KUPX-TV	16.2	Qubo	Grit	With the shutdown of Ion Plus, Qubo and Ion Shop and as a consequence of The E. W. Scripps Company's purchase of Ion Media (along with concurrent spin-offs of some Ion O&Os to INYO Broadcast Holdings), Ion Television's owned and affiliated stations and Ion Plus' O&O stations reconfigured their channel map to add selected networks owned by fellow Scripps subsidiary Katz Broadcasting in place of the defunct networks.	
March 1	Salt Lake City, Utah	KUPX-TV	16.3	Ion Plus	Laff	With the shutdown of Ion Plus, Qubo and Ion Shop and as a consequence of The E. W. Scripps Company's purchase of Ion Media (along with concurrent spin-offs of some Ion O&Os to INYO Broadcast Holdings), Ion Television's owned and affiliated stations and Ion Plus' O&O stations reconfigured their channel map to add selected networks owned by fellow Scripps subsidiary Katz Broadcasting in place of the defunct networks.	
March 1	Salt Lake City, Utah	KUPX-TV	16.4	Ion Shop	Bounce TV	With the shutdown of Ion Plus, Qubo and Ion Shop and as a consequence of The E. W. Scripps Company's purchase of Ion Media (along with concurrent spin-offs of some Ion O&Os to INYO Broadcast Holdings), Ion Television's owned and affiliated stations and Ion Plus' O&O stations reconfigured their channel map to add selected networks owned by fellow Scripps subsidiary Katz Broadcasting in place of the defunct networks.	
March 1	San Antonio, Texas	KPXL-TV	26.2	Qubo	Court TV	With the shutdown of Ion Plus, Qubo and Ion Shop and as a consequence of The E. W. Scripps Company's purchase of Ion Media (along with concurrent spin-offs of some Ion O&Os to INYO Broadcast Holdings), Ion Television's owned and affiliated stations and Ion Plus' O&O stations reconfigured their channel map to add selected networks owned by fellow Scripps subsidiary Katz Broadcasting in place of the defunct networks.	
March 1	San Antonio, Texas	KPXL-TV	26.3	Ion Plus	Laff	With the shutdown of Ion Plus, Qubo and Ion Shop and as a consequence of The E. W. Scripps Company's purchase of Ion Media (along with concurrent spin-offs of some Ion O&Os to INYO Broadcast Holdings), Ion Television's owned and affiliated stations and Ion Plus' O&O stations reconfigured their channel map to add selected networks owned by fellow Scripps subsidiary Katz Broadcasting in place of the defunct networks.	
March 1	San Antonio, Texas	KPXL-TV	26.4	Ion Shop	Court TV Mystery	With the shutdown of Ion Plus, Qubo and Ion Shop and as a consequence of The E. W. Scripps Company's purchase of Ion Media (along with concurrent spin-offs of some Ion O&Os to INYO Broadcast Holdings), Ion Television's owned and affiliated stations and Ion Plus' O&O stations reconfigured their channel map to add selected networks owned by fellow Scripps subsidiary Katz Broadcasting in place of the defunct networks.	
March 1	San Francisco - Oakland - San Jose, California	KKPX-TV	65.2	Qubo	Bounce TV	With the shutdown of Ion Plus, Qubo and Ion Shop and as a consequence of The E. W. Scripps Company's purchase of Ion Media (along with concurrent spin-offs of some Ion O&Os to INYO Broadcast Holdings), Ion Television's owned and affiliated stations and Ion Plus' O&O stations reconfigured their channel map to add selected networks owned by fellow Scripps subsidiary Katz Broadcasting in place of the defunct networks.	
March 1	San Francisco - Oakland - San Jose, California	KKPX-TV	65.3	Ion Plus	Court TV	With the shutdown of Ion Plus, Qubo and Ion Shop and as a consequence of The E. W. Scripps Company's purchase of Ion Media (along with concurrent spin-offs of some Ion O&Os to INYO Broadcast Holdings), Ion Television's owned and affiliated stations and Ion Plus' O&O stations reconfigured their channel map to add selected networks owned by fellow Scripps subsidiary Katz Broadcasting in place of the defunct networks.	
March 1	San Francisco - Oakland - San Jose, California	KKPX-TV	65.4	Ion Shop	Grit	With the shutdown of Ion Plus, Qubo and Ion Shop and as a consequence of The E. W. Scripps Company's purchase of Ion Media (along with concurrent spin-offs of some Ion O&Os to INYO Broadcast Holdings), Ion Television's owned and affiliated stations and Ion Plus' O&O stations reconfigured their channel map to add selected networks owned by fellow Scripps subsidiary Katz Broadcasting in place of the defunct networks.	
March 1	San Francisco - Oakland - San Jose, California	KKPX-TV	65.5	QVC	Laff	With the shutdown of Ion Plus, Qubo and Ion Shop and as a consequence of The E. W. Scripps Company's purchase of Ion Media (along with concurrent spin-offs of some Ion O&Os to INYO Broadcast Holdings), Ion Television's owned and affiliated stations and Ion Plus' O&O stations reconfigured their channel map to add selected networks owned by fellow Scripps subsidiary Katz Broadcasting in place of the defunct networks.	
March 1	Scranton - Wilkes-Barre, Pennsylvania	WQPX-TV	64.2	Qubo	Bounce TV	With the shutdown of Ion Plus, Qubo and Ion Shop and as a consequence of The E. W. Scripps Company's purchase of Ion Media (along with concurrent spin-offs of some Ion O&Os to INYO Broadcast Holdings), Ion Television's owned and affiliated stations and Ion Plus' O&O stations reconfigured their channel map to add selected networks owned by fellow Scripps subsidiary Katz Broadcasting in place of the defunct networks.	
March 1	Scranton - Wilkes-Barre, Pennsylvania	WQPX-TV	64.3	Ion Plus	Court TV	With the shutdown of Ion Plus, Qubo and Ion Shop and as a consequence of The E. W. Scripps Company's purchase of Ion Media (along with concurrent spin-offs of some Ion O&Os to INYO Broadcast Holdings), Ion Television's owned and affiliated stations and Ion Plus' O&O stations reconfigured their channel map to add selected networks owned by fellow Scripps subsidiary Katz Broadcasting in place of the defunct networks.	
March 1	Scranton - Wilkes-Barre, Pennsylvania	WQPX-TV	64.4	Ion Shop	Grit	With the shutdown of Ion Plus, Qubo and Ion Shop and as a consequence of The E. W. Scripps Company's purchase of Ion Media (along with concurrent spin-offs of some Ion O&Os to INYO Broadcast Holdings), Ion Television's owned and affiliated stations and Ion Plus' O&O stations reconfigured their channel map to add selected networks owned by fellow Scripps subsidiary Katz Broadcasting in place of the defunct networks.	
March 1	Seattle - Tacoma, Washington	KWPX-TV	33.2	Qubo	Court TV	With the shutdown of Ion Plus, Qubo and Ion Shop and as a consequence of The E. W. Scripps Company's purchase of Ion Media (along with concurrent spin-offs of some Ion O&Os to INYO Broadcast Holdings), Ion Television's owned and affiliated stations and Ion Plus' O&O stations reconfigured their channel map to add selected networks owned by fellow Scripps subsidiary Katz Broadcasting in place of the defunct networks.	
March 1	Seattle - Tacoma, Washington	KWPX-TV	33.3	Ion Life	Bounce TV	With the shutdown of Ion Plus, Qubo and Ion Shop and as a consequence of The E. W. Scripps Company's purchase of Ion Media (along with concurrent spin-offs of some Ion O&Os to INYO Broadcast Holdings), Ion Television's owned and affiliated stations and Ion Plus' O&O stations reconfigured their channel map to add selected networks owned by fellow Scripps subsidiary Katz Broadcasting in place of the defunct networks.	
March 1	Seattle - Tacoma, Washington	KWPX-TV	33.4	Ion Shop	Grit	With the shutdown of Ion Plus, Qubo and Ion Shop and as a consequence of The E. W. Scripps Company's purchase of Ion Media (along with concurrent spin-offs of some Ion O&Os to INYO Broadcast Holdings), Ion Television's owned and affiliated stations and Ion Plus' O&O stations reconfigured their channel map to add selected networks owned by fellow Scripps subsidiary Katz Broadcasting in place of the defunct networks.	
March 1	Spokane, Washington	KGPX-TV	34.2	Qubo	Bounce TV	With the shutdown of Ion Plus, Qubo and Ion Shop and as a consequence of The E. W. Scripps Company's purchase of Ion Media (along with concurrent spin-offs of some Ion O&Os to INYO Broadcast Holdings), Ion Television's owned and affiliated stations and Ion Plus' O&O stations reconfigured their channel map to add selected networks owned by fellow Scripps subsidiary Katz Broadcasting in place of the defunct networks.	
March 1	Spokane, Washington	KGPX-TV	34.3	Ion Plus	Grit	With the shutdown of Ion Plus, Qubo and Ion Shop and as a consequence of The E. W. Scripps Company's purchase of Ion Media (along with concurrent spin-offs of some Ion O&Os to INYO Broadcast Holdings), Ion Television's owned and affiliated stations and Ion Plus' O&O stations reconfigured their channel map to add selected networks owned by fellow Scripps subsidiary Katz Broadcasting in place of the defunct networks.	
March 1	Spokane, Washington	KGPX-TV	34.4	Ion Shop	Court TV Mystery	With the shutdown of Ion Plus, Qubo and Ion Shop and as a consequence of The E. W. Scripps Company's purchase of Ion Media (along with concurrent spin-offs of some Ion O&Os to INYO Broadcast Holdings), Ion Television's owned and affiliated stations and Ion Plus' O&O stations reconfigured their channel map to add selected networks owned by fellow Scripps subsidiary Katz Broadcasting in place of the defunct networks.	
March 1	Syracuse, New York	WSPX-TV	56.2	Qubo	Court TV	With the shutdown of Ion Plus, Qubo and Ion Shop and as a consequence of The E. W. Scripps Company's purchase of Ion Media (along with concurrent spin-offs of some Ion O&Os to INYO Broadcast Holdings), Ion Television's owned and affiliated stations and Ion Plus' O&O stations reconfigured their channel map to add selected networks owned by fellow Scripps subsidiary Katz Broadcasting in place of the defunct networks.	
March 1	Syracuse, New York	WSPX-TV	56.3	Ion Plus	Grit	With the shutdown of Ion Plus, Qubo and Ion Shop and as a consequence of The E. W. Scripps Company's purchase of Ion Media (along with concurrent spin-offs of some Ion O&Os to INYO Broadcast Holdings), Ion Television's owned and affiliated stations and Ion Plus' O&O stations reconfigured their channel map to add selected networks owned by fellow Scripps subsidiary Katz Broadcasting in place of the defunct networks.	
March 1	Syracuse, New York	WSPX-TV	56.4	Ion Shop	Court TV Mystery	With the shutdown of Ion Plus, Qubo and Ion Shop and as a consequence of The E. W. Scripps Company's purchase of Ion Media (along with concurrent spin-offs of some Ion O&Os to INYO Broadcast Holdings), Ion Television's owned and affiliated stations and Ion Plus' O&O stations reconfigured their channel map to add selected networks owned by fellow Scripps subsidiary Katz Broadcasting in place of the defunct networks.	
March 1	Tampa - St. Petersburg, Florida	WXPX-TV	66.2	Qubo	Court TV	With the shutdown of Ion Plus, Qubo and Ion Shop and as a consequence of The E. W. Scripps Company's purchase of Ion Media (along with concurrent spin-offs of some Ion O&Os to INYO Broadcast Holdings), Ion Television's owned and affiliated stations and Ion Plus' O&O stations reconfigured their channel map to add selected networks owned by fellow Scripps subsidiary Katz Broadcasting in place of the defunct networks.	
March 1	Tampa - St. Petersburg, Florida	WXPX-TV	66.3	Ion Plus	Grit	With the shutdown of Ion Plus, Qubo and Ion Shop and as a consequence of The E. W. Scripps Company's purchase of Ion Media (along with concurrent spin-offs of some Ion O&Os to INYO Broadcast Holdings), Ion Television's owned and affiliated stations and Ion Plus' O&O stations reconfigured their channel map to add selected networks owned by fellow Scripps subsidiary Katz Broadcasting in place of the defunct networks.	
March 1	Tampa - St. Petersburg, Florida	WXPX-TV	66.4	Ion Shop	Laff	With the shutdown of Ion Plus, Qubo and Ion Shop and as a consequence of The E. W. Scripps Company's purchase of Ion Media (along with concurrent spin-offs of some Ion O&Os to INYO Broadcast Holdings), Ion Television's owned and affiliated stations and Ion Plus' O&O stations reconfigured their channel map to add selected networks owned by fellow Scripps subsidiary Katz Broadcasting in place of the defunct networks.	
March 1	Tulsa, Oklahoma	KTPX-TV	44.2	Qubo	NBC (Note: Subchannel transitioned into a simulcast of KJRH-TV, which is co-owned with KTPX by the E. W. Scripps Company.)	With the shutdown of Ion Plus, Qubo and Ion Shop and as a consequence of The E. W. Scripps Company's purchase of Ion Media (along with concurrent spin-offs of some Ion O&Os to INYO Broadcast Holdings), Ion Television's owned and affiliated stations and Ion Plus' O&O stations reconfigured their channel map to add selected networks owned by fellow Scripps subsidiary Katz Broadcasting in place of the defunct networks.	
March 1	Tulsa, Oklahoma	KTPX-TV	44.3	Ion Plus	Court TV	With the shutdown of Ion Plus, Qubo and Ion Shop and as a consequence of The E. W. Scripps Company's purchase of Ion Media (along with concurrent spin-offs of some Ion O&Os to INYO Broadcast Holdings), Ion Television's owned and affiliated stations and Ion Plus' O&O stations reconfigured their channel map to add selected networks owned by fellow Scripps subsidiary Katz Broadcasting in place of the defunct networks.	
March 1	Tulsa, Oklahoma	KTPX-TV	44.4	Ion Shop	Grit	With the shutdown of Ion Plus, Qubo and Ion Shop and as a consequence of The E. W. Scripps Company's purchase of Ion Media (along with concurrent spin-offs of some Ion O&Os to INYO Broadcast Holdings), Ion Television's owned and affiliated stations and Ion Plus' O&O stations reconfigured their channel map to add selected networks owned by fellow Scripps subsidiary Katz Broadcasting in place of the defunct networks.	
March 1	Washington, D.C.	WPXW-TV	66.2	Qubo	Court TV Mystery	With the shutdown of Ion Plus, Qubo and Ion Shop and as a consequence of The E. W. Scripps Company's purchase of Ion Media (along with concurrent spin-offs of some Ion O&Os to INYO Broadcast Holdings), Ion Television's owned and affiliated stations and Ion Plus' O&O stations reconfigured their channel map to add selected networks owned by fellow Scripps subsidiary Katz Broadcasting in place of the defunct networks.	
March 1	Washington, D.C.	WPXW-TV	66.3	Ion Plus	Court TV	With the shutdown of Ion Plus, Qubo and Ion Shop and as a consequence of The E. W. Scripps Company's purchase of Ion Media (along with concurrent spin-offs of some Ion O&Os to INYO Broadcast Holdings), Ion Television's owned and affiliated stations and Ion Plus' O&O stations reconfigured their channel map to add selected networks owned by fellow Scripps subsidiary Katz Broadcasting in place of the defunct networks.	
March 1	Washington, D.C.	WPXW-TV	66.4	Ion Shop	Laff	With the shutdown of Ion Plus, Qubo and Ion Shop and as a consequence of The E. W. Scripps Company's purchase of Ion Media (along with concurrent spin-offs of some Ion O&Os to INYO Broadcast Holdings), Ion Television's owned and affiliated stations and Ion Plus' O&O stations reconfigured their channel map to add selected networks owned by fellow Scripps subsidiary Katz Broadcasting in place of the defunct networks.	
March 1	Wausau - Rhinelander, Wisconsin	WTPX-TV	46.2	Qubo	Grit	With the shutdown of Ion Plus, Qubo and Ion Shop and as a consequence of The E. W. Scripps Company's purchase of Ion Media (along with concurrent spin-offs of some Ion O&Os to INYO Broadcast Holdings), Ion Television's owned and affiliated stations and Ion Plus' O&O stations reconfigured their channel map to add selected networks owned by fellow Scripps subsidiary Katz Broadcasting in place of the defunct networks.	
March 1	Wausau - Rhinelander, Wisconsin	WTPX-TV	46.3	Ion Plus	Court TV Mystery	With the shutdown of Ion Plus, Qubo and Ion Shop and as a consequence of The E. W. Scripps Company's purchase of Ion Media (along with concurrent spin-offs of some Ion O&Os to INYO Broadcast Holdings), Ion Television's owned and affiliated stations and Ion Plus' O&O stations reconfigured their channel map to add selected networks owned by fellow Scripps subsidiary Katz Broadcasting in place of the defunct networks.	
March 1	Wausau - Rhinelander, Wisconsin	WTPX-TV	46.4	Ion Shop	Laff	With the shutdown of Ion Plus, Qubo and Ion Shop and as a consequence of The E. W. Scripps Company's purchase of Ion Media (along with concurrent spin-offs of some Ion O&Os to INYO Broadcast Holdings), Ion Television's owned and affiliated stations and Ion Plus' O&O stations reconfigured their channel map to add selected networks owned by fellow Scripps subsidiary Katz Broadcasting in place of the defunct networks.	
March 1	Wausau - Rhinelander, Wisconsin	WTPX-TV	46.5	QVC	Bounce TV	With the shutdown of Ion Plus, Qubo and Ion Shop and as a consequence of The E. W. Scripps Company's purchase of Ion Media (along with concurrent spin-offs of some Ion O&Os to INYO Broadcast Holdings), Ion Television's owned and affiliated stations and Ion Plus' O&O stations reconfigured their channel map to add selected networks owned by fellow Scripps subsidiary Katz Broadcasting in place of the defunct networks.	
March 1	West Palm Beach, Florida	WPTV-TV	5.4	Court TV Mystery	Start TV	With the shutdown of Ion Plus, Qubo and Ion Shop and as a consequence of The E. W. Scripps Company's purchase of Ion Media (along with concurrent spin-offs of some Ion O&Os to INYO Broadcast Holdings), Ion Television's owned and affiliated stations and Ion Plus' O&O stations reconfigured their channel map to add selected networks owned by fellow Scripps subsidiary Katz Broadcasting in place of the defunct networks.	
March 1	West Palm Beach, Florida	WPXP-TV	67.2	Qubo	Court TV	With the shutdown of Ion Plus, Qubo and Ion Shop and as a consequence of The E. W. Scripps Company's purchase of Ion Media (along with concurrent spin-offs of some Ion O&Os to INYO Broadcast Holdings), Ion Television's owned and affiliated stations and Ion Plus' O&O stations reconfigured their channel map to add selected networks owned by fellow Scripps subsidiary Katz Broadcasting in place of the defunct networks.	
March 1	West Palm Beach, Florida	WPXP-TV	67.3	Ion Plus	Court TV Mystery	With the shutdown of Ion Plus, Qubo and Ion Shop and as a consequence of The E. W. Scripps Company's purchase of Ion Media (along with concurrent spin-offs of some Ion O&Os to INYO Broadcast Holdings), Ion Television's owned and affiliated stations and Ion Plus' O&O stations reconfigured their channel map to add selected networks owned by fellow Scripps subsidiary Katz Broadcasting in place of the defunct networks.	
March 1	West Palm Beach, Florida	WPXP-TV	67.4	Ion Shop	Laff	With the shutdown of Ion Plus, Qubo and Ion Shop and as a consequence of The E. W. Scripps Company's purchase of Ion Media (along with concurrent spin-offs of some Ion O&Os to INYO Broadcast Holdings), Ion Television's owned and affiliated stations and Ion Plus' O&O stations reconfigured their channel map to add selected networks owned by fellow Scripps subsidiary Katz Broadcasting in place of the defunct networks.	
March 1	West Palm Beach, Florida	WPXP-TV	67.5	QVC	Grit	With the shutdown of Ion Plus, Qubo and Ion Shop and as a consequence of The E. W. Scripps Company's purchase of Ion Media (along with concurrent spin-offs of some Ion O&Os to INYO Broadcast Holdings), Ion Television's owned and affiliated stations and Ion Plus' O&O stations reconfigured their channel map to add selected networks owned by fellow Scripps subsidiary Katz Broadcasting in place of the defunct networks.	
July 1	Albany, New York	WYPX-TV	55.5	QVC	Defy TV	Many Scripps/Ion stations then shuffle their affiliations around in mid-summer as the result of the launch of two new subchannel networks featuring reality programming from the A+E Networks library; the male-focused Defy TV, and TrueReal, which features programs targeting women.	
July 1	Albany, New York	WYPX-TV	55.6	HSN	TrueReal	Many Scripps/Ion stations then shuffle their affiliations around in mid-summer as the result of the launch of two new subchannel networks featuring reality programming from the A+E Networks library; the male-focused Defy TV, and TrueReal, which features programs targeting women.	
July 1	Birmingham, Alabama	WPXH-TV	44.6	HSN	Defy TV	Many Scripps/Ion stations then shuffle their affiliations around in mid-summer as the result of the launch of two new subchannel networks featuring reality programming from the A+E Networks library; the male-focused Defy TV, and TrueReal, which features programs targeting women.	
July 1	Boise, Idaho	KTRV-TV	12.5	QVC	Defy TV	Many Scripps/Ion stations then shuffle their affiliations around in mid-summer as the result of the launch of two new subchannel networks featuring reality programming from the A+E Networks library; the male-focused Defy TV, and TrueReal, which features programs targeting women.	
July 1	Boise, Idaho	KTRV-TV	12.6	HSN	TrueReal	Many Scripps/Ion stations then shuffle their affiliations around in mid-summer as the result of the launch of two new subchannel networks featuring reality programming from the A+E Networks library; the male-focused Defy TV, and TrueReal, which features programs targeting women.	
July 1	Buffalo, New York	WPXJ-TV	51.5	QVC	Defy TV	Many Scripps/Ion stations then shuffle their affiliations around in mid-summer as the result of the launch of two new subchannel networks featuring reality programming from the A+E Networks library; the male-focused Defy TV, and TrueReal, which features programs targeting women.	
July 1	Buffalo, New York	WPXJ-TV	51.6	HSN	TrueReal	Many Scripps/Ion stations then shuffle their affiliations around in mid-summer as the result of the launch of two new subchannel networks featuring reality programming from the A+E Networks library; the male-focused Defy TV, and TrueReal, which features programs targeting women.	
July 1	Chicago, Illinois	WCPX-TV	38.5	QVC	Defy TV	Many Scripps/Ion stations then shuffle their affiliations around in mid-summer as the result of the launch of two new subchannel networks featuring reality programming from the A+E Networks library; the male-focused Defy TV, and TrueReal, which features programs targeting women.	
July 1	Chicago, Illinois	WCPX-TV	38.6	HSN	TrueReal	Many Scripps/Ion stations then shuffle their affiliations around in mid-summer as the result of the launch of two new subchannel networks featuring reality programming from the A+E Networks library; the male-focused Defy TV, and TrueReal, which features programs targeting women.	
July 1	Cleveland, Ohio	WEWS-TV	5.4	Court TV	TrueReal	Many Scripps/Ion stations then shuffle their affiliations around in mid-summer as the result of the launch of two new subchannel networks featuring reality programming from the A+E Networks library; the male-focused Defy TV, and TrueReal, which features programs targeting women.	
July 1	Cleveland, Ohio	WVPX-TV	23.5	HSN	Defy TV	Many Scripps/Ion stations then shuffle their affiliations around in mid-summer as the result of the launch of two new subchannel networks featuring reality programming from the A+E Networks library; the male-focused Defy TV, and TrueReal, which features programs targeting women.	
July 1	Colorado Springs, Colorado	KOAA-TV	5.2	WeatherNation TV	Court TV	Many Scripps/Ion stations then shuffle their affiliations around in mid-summer as the result of the launch of two new subchannel networks featuring reality programming from the A+E Networks library; the male-focused Defy TV, and TrueReal, which features programs targeting women.	
July 1	Colorado Springs, Colorado	KOAA-TV	5.4	Court TV	Defy TV	Many Scripps/Ion stations then shuffle their affiliations around in mid-summer as the result of the launch of two new subchannel networks featuring reality programming from the A+E Networks library; the male-focused Defy TV, and TrueReal, which features programs targeting women.	
July 1	Dallas - Fort Worth, Texas	KPXD-TV	68.5	QVC	Defy TV	Many Scripps/Ion stations then shuffle their affiliations around in mid-summer as the result of the launch of two new subchannel networks featuring reality programming from the A+E Networks library; the male-focused Defy TV, and TrueReal, which features programs targeting women.	
July 1	Dallas - Fort Worth, Texas	KPXD-TV	68.6	HSN	TrueReal	Many Scripps/Ion stations then shuffle their affiliations around in mid-summer as the result of the launch of two new subchannel networks featuring reality programming from the A+E Networks library; the male-focused Defy TV, and TrueReal, which features programs targeting women.	
July 1	Denver, Colorado	KPXC-TV	59.4	Laff	Defy TV	Many Scripps/Ion stations then shuffle their affiliations around in mid-summer as the result of the launch of two new subchannel networks featuring reality programming from the A+E Networks library; the male-focused Defy TV, and TrueReal, which features programs targeting women.	
July 1	Denver, Colorado	KPXC-TV	59.5	HSN	TrueReal	Many Scripps/Ion stations then shuffle their affiliations around in mid-summer as the result of the launch of two new subchannel networks featuring reality programming from the A+E Networks library; the male-focused Defy TV, and TrueReal, which features programs targeting women.	
July 1	Detroit, Michigan	WPXD-TV	31.4	Court TV Mystery	Defy TV	Many Scripps/Ion stations then shuffle their affiliations around in mid-summer as the result of the launch of two new subchannel networks featuring reality programming from the A+E Networks library; the male-focused Defy TV, and TrueReal, which features programs targeting women.	
July 1	Detroit, Michigan	WPXD-TV	31.5	QVC	TrueReal	Many Scripps/Ion stations then shuffle their affiliations around in mid-summer as the result of the launch of two new subchannel networks featuring reality programming from the A+E Networks library; the male-focused Defy TV, and TrueReal, which features programs targeting women.	
July 1	Grand Rapids, Michigan	WZPX-TV	43.6	HSN	Defy TV	Many Scripps/Ion stations then shuffle their affiliations around in mid-summer as the result of the launch of two new subchannel networks featuring reality programming from the A+E Networks library; the male-focused Defy TV, and TrueReal, which features programs targeting women.	
July 1	Greensboro - Winston-Salem - High Point, North Carolina	WGPX-TV	16.5	QVC	Defy TV	Many Scripps/Ion stations then shuffle their affiliations around in mid-summer as the result of the launch of two new subchannel networks featuring reality programming from the A+E Networks library; the male-focused Defy TV, and TrueReal, which features programs targeting women.	
July 1	Greensboro - Winston-Salem - High Point, North Carolina	WGPX-TV	16.6	HSN	TrueReal	Many Scripps/Ion stations then shuffle their affiliations around in mid-summer as the result of the launch of two new subchannel networks featuring reality programming from the A+E Networks library; the male-focused Defy TV, and TrueReal, which features programs targeting women.	
July 1	Hartford, Connecticut	WHPX-TV	26.5	QVC	Defy TV	Many Scripps/Ion stations then shuffle their affiliations around in mid-summer as the result of the launch of two new subchannel networks featuring reality programming from the A+E Networks library; the male-focused Defy TV, and TrueReal, which features programs targeting women.	
July 1	Hartford, Connecticut	WHPX-TV	26.6	HSN	TrueReal	Many Scripps/Ion stations then shuffle their affiliations around in mid-summer as the result of the launch of two new subchannel networks featuring reality programming from the A+E Networks library; the male-focused Defy TV, and TrueReal, which features programs targeting women.	
July 1	Honolulu, Hawaii	KPXO-TV	66.4	Court TV Mystery	Defy TV	Many Scripps/Ion stations then shuffle their affiliations around in mid-summer as the result of the launch of two new subchannel networks featuring reality programming from the A+E Networks library; the male-focused Defy TV, and TrueReal, which features programs targeting women.	
July 1	Honolulu, Hawaii	KPXO-TV	66.5	QVC	TrueReal	Many Scripps/Ion stations then shuffle their affiliations around in mid-summer as the result of the launch of two new subchannel networks featuring reality programming from the A+E Networks library; the male-focused Defy TV, and TrueReal, which features programs targeting women.	
July 1	Indianapolis, Indiana	WIPX-TV	63.5	QVC	Defy TV	Many Scripps/Ion stations then shuffle their affiliations around in mid-summer as the result of the launch of two new subchannel networks featuring reality programming from the A+E Networks library; the male-focused Defy TV, and TrueReal, which features programs targeting women.	
July 1	Indianapolis, Indiana	WIPX-TV	63.6	HSN	TrueReal	Many Scripps/Ion stations then shuffle their affiliations around in mid-summer as the result of the launch of two new subchannel networks featuring reality programming from the A+E Networks library; the male-focused Defy TV, and TrueReal, which features programs targeting women.	
July 1	Kansas City, Missouri	KPXE-TV	50.3	Grit	Defy TV	Many Scripps/Ion stations then shuffle their affiliations around in mid-summer as the result of the launch of two new subchannel networks featuring reality programming from the A+E Networks library; the male-focused Defy TV, and TrueReal, which features programs targeting women.	
July 1	Kansas City, Missouri	KPXE-TV	50.4	Laff	TrueReal	Many Scripps/Ion stations then shuffle their affiliations around in mid-summer as the result of the launch of two new subchannel networks featuring reality programming from the A+E Networks library; the male-focused Defy TV, and TrueReal, which features programs targeting women.	
July 1	Lexington, Kentucky	WUPX-TV	67.5	QVC	Defy TV	Many Scripps/Ion stations then shuffle their affiliations around in mid-summer as the result of the launch of two new subchannel networks featuring reality programming from the A+E Networks library; the male-focused Defy TV, and TrueReal, which features programs targeting women.	
July 1	Lexington, Kentucky	WUPX-TV	67.6	HSN	TueReal	Many Scripps/Ion stations then shuffle their affiliations around in mid-summer as the result of the launch of two new subchannel networks featuring reality programming from the A+E Networks library; the male-focused Defy TV, and TrueReal, which features programs targeting women.	
July 1	Los Angeles, California	KPXN-TV	30.3	Grit	Defy TV	Many Scripps/Ion stations then shuffle their affiliations around in mid-summer as the result of the launch of two new subchannel networks featuring reality programming from the A+E Networks library; the male-focused Defy TV, and TrueReal, which features programs targeting women.	
July 1	Los Angeles, California	KPXN-TV	30.4	Court TV Mystery	TrueReal	Many Scripps/Ion stations then shuffle their affiliations around in mid-summer as the result of the launch of two new subchannel networks featuring reality programming from the A+E Networks library; the male-focused Defy TV, and TrueReal, which features programs targeting women.	
July 1	Memphis, Tennessee	WPXX-TV	50.5	QVC	TrueReal	Many Scripps/Ion stations then shuffle their affiliations around in mid-summer as the result of the launch of two new subchannel networks featuring reality programming from the A+E Networks library; the male-focused Defy TV, and TrueReal, which features programs targeting women.	
July 1	Memphis, Tennessee	WPXX-TV	50.6	HSN	Defy TV	Many Scripps/Ion stations then shuffle their affiliations around in mid-summer as the result of the launch of two new subchannel networks featuring reality programming from the A+E Networks library; the male-focused Defy TV, and TrueReal, which features programs targeting women.	
July 1	Nashville, Tennessee	WNPX-TV	28.5	QVC	Defy TV	Many Scripps/Ion stations then shuffle their affiliations around in mid-summer as the result of the launch of two new subchannel networks featuring reality programming from the A+E Networks library; the male-focused Defy TV, and TrueReal, which features programs targeting women.	
July 1	Nashville, Tennessee	WNPX-TV	28.6	HSN	TruReal	Many Scripps/Ion stations then shuffle their affiliations around in mid-summer as the result of the launch of two new subchannel networks featuring reality programming from the A+E Networks library; the male-focused Defy TV, and TrueReal, which features programs targeting women.	
July 1	New York City, New York	WPXN-TV	31.4	Court TV	Defy TV	Many Scripps/Ion stations then shuffle their affiliations around in mid-summer as the result of the launch of two new subchannel networks featuring reality programming from the A+E Networks library; the male-focused Defy TV, and TrueReal, which features programs targeting women.	
July 1	New York City, New York	WPXN-TV	31.6	HSN	TrueReal	Many Scripps/Ion stations then shuffle their affiliations around in mid-summer as the result of the launch of two new subchannel networks featuring reality programming from the A+E Networks library; the male-focused Defy TV, and TrueReal, which features programs targeting women.	
July 1	Norfolk - Portsmouth - Newport News, Virginia	WPXV-TV	49.4	Court TV	Defy TV	Many Scripps/Ion stations then shuffle their affiliations around in mid-summer as the result of the launch of two new subchannel networks featuring reality programming from the A+E Networks library; the male-focused Defy TV, and TrueReal, which features programs targeting women.	
July 1	Norfolk - Portsmouth - Newport News, Virginia	WPXV-TV	49.5	QVC	TrueReal	Many Scripps/Ion stations then shuffle their affiliations around in mid-summer as the result of the launch of two new subchannel networks featuring reality programming from the A+E Networks library; the male-focused Defy TV, and TrueReal, which features programs targeting women.	
July 1	Oklahoma City, Oklahoma	KOPX-TV	62.5	QVC	Defy TV	Many Scripps/Ion stations then shuffle their affiliations around in mid-summer as the result of the launch of two new subchannel networks featuring reality programming from the A+E Networks library; the male-focused Defy TV, and TrueReal, which features programs targeting women.	
July 1	Oklahoma City, Oklahoma	KOPX-TV	62.6	HSN	TrueReal	Many Scripps/Ion stations then shuffle their affiliations around in mid-summer as the result of the launch of two new subchannel networks featuring reality programming from the A+E Networks library; the male-focused Defy TV, and TrueReal, which features programs targeting women.	
July 1	Philadelphia, Pennsylvania	WPPX-TV	61.4	Court TV Mystery	TrueReal	Many Scripps/Ion stations then shuffle their affiliations around in mid-summer as the result of the launch of two new subchannel networks featuring reality programming from the A+E Networks library; the male-focused Defy TV, and TrueReal, which features programs targeting women.	
July 1	Philadelphia, Pennsylvania	WPPX-TV	61.6	QVC	Defy TV	Many Scripps/Ion stations then shuffle their affiliations around in mid-summer as the result of the launch of two new subchannel networks featuring reality programming from the A+E Networks library; the male-focused Defy TV, and TrueReal, which features programs targeting women.	
July 1	Phoenix, Arizona	KPPX-TV	51.5	QVC	Defy TV	Many Scripps/Ion stations then shuffle their affiliations around in mid-summer as the result of the launch of two new subchannel networks featuring reality programming from the A+E Networks library; the male-focused Defy TV, and TrueReal, which features programs targeting women.	
July 1	Spokane, Washington	KGPX-TV	34.5	QVC	Defy TV	Many Scripps/Ion stations then shuffle their affiliations around in mid-summer as the result of the launch of two new subchannel networks featuring reality programming from the A+E Networks library; the male-focused Defy TV, and TrueReal, which features programs targeting women.	
July 1	Spokane, Washington	KGPX-TV	34.6	HSN	TrueReal	Many Scripps/Ion stations then shuffle their affiliations around in mid-summer as the result of the launch of two new subchannel networks featuring reality programming from the A+E Networks library; the male-focused Defy TV, and TrueReal, which features programs targeting women.	
July 1	Tampa - St. Petersburg, Florida	WXPX-TV	66.5	QVC	Defy TV	Many Scripps/Ion stations then shuffle their affiliations around in mid-summer as the result of the launch of two new subchannel networks featuring reality programming from the A+E Networks library; the male-focused Defy TV, and TrueReal, which features programs targeting women.	
July 1	Tampa - St. Petersburg, Florida	WXPX-TV	66.6	HSN	TrueReal	Many Scripps/Ion stations then shuffle their affiliations around in mid-summer as the result of the launch of two new subchannel networks featuring reality programming from the A+E Networks library; the male-focused Defy TV, and TrueReal, which features programs targeting women.	
July 1	West Palm Beach, Florida	WPXP-TV	67.6	HSN	Defy TV	Many Scripps/Ion stations then shuffle their affiliations around in mid-summer as the result of the launch of two new subchannel networks featuring reality programming from the A+E Networks library; the male-focused Defy TV, and TrueReal, which features programs targeting women.	

=== Station closures ===
Station	Channel	Affiliation	Market	Date	Notes	Source
WCKD-LP	30 (analog)	Positiv	Bangor, Maine	July 13	WCKD-LP's license was cancelled by the Federal Communications Commission (FCC) on August 4, 2021, due to the station not obtaining a license to convert to digital operations by the July 13, 2021, deadline.	
XHRIO	15.1	The CW	Matamoros, Tamaulipas, Mexico (Rio Grande Valley, Texas)	December 31	In late 2019, when owner Entravision Communications released its third-quarter earnings, it announced that it would not pay the 20-year lump sum renewal for the station's license. As a result, the station is expected to cease operations at the end of its concession in December 2021 after broadcasting as an English language station for most of its 42-year history. The closure of XHRIO-TDT leaves Tamaulipas and Nuevo Leon to depend on American television stations for English-language content.	

== See also ==
- Impact of the COVID-19 pandemic on television in the United States
