= List of stations owned and operated by Ion Media =

Ion Media Television, Inc.
- Type: Division
- Industry: Television
- Founded: 1988
- Headquarters: West Palm Beach, Florida, USA
- Parent: Ion Media
- Website: Website

The following is a list of television stations owned by the Ion Media unit of Scripps Networks, a subsidiary of the E. W. Scripps Company. This list also includes radio and television stations formerly owned by corporate antecedent Paxson Communications and the company's founder, Lowell "Bud" Paxson.

- (**) – Indicates station was built and signed on by either Ion Media or Paxson Communications.

== Current stations ==
Stations currently owned by Ion Media
Media market	State/Terr.	Station	Affiliated	Purchased	Notes
Los Angeles	California	KILM	2018	2018	(Note: Primary channel is affiliated with Bounce TV.)
Los Angeles	California	KPXN-TV	1998	1998	
Sacramento	California	KSPX-TV	1998	1998	
San Francisco–Oakland	California	KKPX-TV	1998	1997	
Washington, D.C.	District of Columbia	WPXW-TV	1998	1997	
Jacksonville	Florida	WPXC-TV	2000	2000	
Miami–Fort Lauderdale	Florida	WPXM-TV	1998	1997	
Orlando	Florida	WOPX-TV	1998	1998	
Tampa–St. Petersburg	Florida	WXPX-TV **	1998	1994	(Note: Primary channel is an independent.)
Atlanta	Georgia	WPXA-TV	1998	1996	
Chicago	Illinois	WCPX-TV	1998	1998	
Cedar Rapids	Iowa	KPXR-TV **	1998	1997	
Des Moines	Iowa	KFPX-TV **	1998	1998	
New Orleans	Louisiana	WPXL-TV	2008	2008	
Portland	Maine	WIPL	2018	2018	
Hagerstown	Maryland	WWPX-TV	1998	1994	(Note: Satellite of WPXW-TV.)
Boston	Massachusetts	WBPX-TV	1999	1999	
Woburn	Massachusetts	WDPX-TV	1999	1999	(Note: Primary channel is affiliated with Grit.)
Minneapolis–St. Paul	Minnesota	KPXM-TV	1998	1996	
St. Louis	Missouri	WRBU	2014	2014	
Las Vegas	Nevada	KMCC	2020	2020	
Concord–Manchester	New Hampshire	WPXG-TV	1999	1999	(Note: Satellite of WBPX-TV.)
New York	New York	WPXN-TV	1998	1997	
Syracuse	New York	WSPX-TV	1998	1998	
Greenville–New Bern	North Carolina	WEPX-TV	1998	1998	
Jacksonville	North Carolina	WPXU-TV	1999	1999	(Note: Satellite of WEPX-TV.)
Raleigh–Durham	North Carolina	WFPX-TV	1998	1998	(Note: Primary channel is affiliated with Laff.)
Raleigh–Durham	North Carolina	WRPX-TV	1998	1998	
Columbus	Ohio	WSFJ-TV	2018	2018	
Springfield–Dayton	Ohio	WKOI-TV	2018	2018	
Tulsa	Oklahoma	KTPX-TV **	1998	1997	
Portland	Oregon	KPXG-TV	1998	1996	
Philadelphia	Pennsylvania	WPPX-TV	1998	1995	
Pittsburgh	Pennsylvania	WINP-TV	2011	2011	
Scranton–Wilkes-Barre	Pennsylvania	WQPX-TV **	1998	1998	
Providence	Rhode Island	WPXQ-TV	1998	1996	
Columbia	South Carolina	WZRB	2014	2014	
Nashville	Tennessee	WNPX-TV	1998	1998	
Knoxville	Tennessee	WPXK-TV **	1998	1993	
Dallas–Fort Worth	Texas	KPXD-TV **	1998	1996	
Houston	Texas	KPXB-TV	1998	1995	
San Antonio	Texas	KPXL-TV **	1999	1999	
Salt Lake City	Utah	KUPX-TV	1999	1999	
Roanoke–Lynchburg	Virginia	WPXR-TV	1998	1997	
Seattle–Tacoma	Washington	KWPX-TV	1998	1998	
Charleston–Huntington	West Virginia	WLPX-TV	1998	1998	
Milwaukee	Wisconsin	WPXE-TV	1998	1995	
Wausau	Wisconsin	WTPX-TV **	2001	2001	

== Former stations ==
Stations formerly owned by Paxson Communications/Ion Media
Media market	State/Terr.	Station	Purchased	Sold	Notes
Birmingham	Alabama	WPXH-TV	1996	2021	
Phoenix	Arizona	K67FE	1996	1999	
Phoenix	Arizona	KPPX-TV	1996	2021	
Fresno	California	KPXF	1997	2003	
Denver	Colorado	KPXC-TV	1996	2021	
Hartford–New Haven	Connecticut	WHPX-TV	1995	2021	
Washington, D.C.	District of Columbia	WSIT-LP	1996	1999	
Jacksonville	Florida	WFSJ	1997	1998	
Jacksonville	Florida	WNZS	1993	1998	
Jacksonville	Florida	WPLA	1993	1998	(Note: Known as WAIA prior to 1995.)
Jacksonville	Florida	WROO	1991	1998	
Jacksonville	Florida	WTLK-FM	1996	1998	
Jacksonville	Florida	WZNZ	1993	1998	
Key West	Florida	WAVK	1996	1998	
Key West	Florida	WFKZ	1996	1998	
Key West	Florida	WKRY	1996	1998	
Miami–Fort Lauderdale	Florida	WFTL	1995	1998	
Miami–Fort Lauderdale	Florida	WINZ	1992	1998	
Miami–Fort Lauderdale	Florida	WIOD	1996	1998	
Miami–Fort Lauderdale	Florida	WLVE	1992	1998	
Miami–Fort Lauderdale	Florida	WPLL	1996	1998	
Miami–Fort Lauderdale	Florida	WSRF	1996	1997	
Miami–Fort Lauderdale	Florida	WZTA	1991	1998	
Orlando	Florida	WJRR	1993	1998	
Orlando	Florida	WMGF	1993	1998	
Orlando	Florida	WPRD	1993	1998	
Orlando	Florida	WQTM	1994	1998	(Note: Known as WWZN prior to 1996.)
Orlando	Florida	WSHE	1996	1998	(Note: Known as WDIZ prior to 1996.)
Orlando	Florida	WTKS	1991	1993	(Note: Known as WSSP prior to 1992, and as WZTU, WHVE and WWNZ-FM throughout 1992.)
Orlando	Florida	WTKS	1996	1998	(Note: Known as WSSP prior to 1992, and as WZTU, WHVE and WWNZ-FM throughout 1992.)
Orlando	Florida	WWNZ	1991	1998	
Panama City	Florida	WDIZ	1996	1998	
Panama City	Florida	WFSY	1996	1998	
Panama City	Florida	WPAP-FM	1996	1998	
Panama City	Florida	WPBH	1996	1998	
Panama City	Florida	WSHF	1996	1998	(Note: Known as WEBZ-FM prior to 1997.)
Pensacola	Florida	WTKX-FM	1996	1998	
Pensacola	Florida	WYCL	1996	1998	
Tallahassee	Florida	WNLS	1996	1998	
Tallahassee	Florida	WJZT	1996	1998	
Tallahassee	Florida	WSNI	1996	1998	
Tallahassee	Florida	WTNT-FM	1996	1998	
Tallahassee	Florida	WXSR	1996	1998	
Tampa–St. Petersburg	Florida	WHPT	1991	1998	
Tampa–St. Petersburg	Florida	WHNZ	1991	1998	
Tampa–St. Petersburg	Florida	WILV	1997	1998	
Tampa–St. Petersburg	Florida	WSJT	1993	1998	(Note: Known as WEZY prior to 1995.)
Tampa–St. Petersburg	Florida	WWQT	1977	1983	
Tampa–St. Petersburg	Florida	WZTM	1995	1998	(Note: Known as WNSE prior to 1996.)
West Palm Beach	Florida	WBZT	1995	1998	
West Palm Beach	Florida	WEAT	1997	1998	
West Palm Beach	Florida	WEAT-FM	1997	1998	
West Palm Beach	Florida	WIRK-FM	1997	1998	
West Palm Beach	Florida	WKGR	1995	1998	
West Palm Beach	Florida	WOLL	1997	1998	
West Palm Beach	Florida	WPBF	1993	1997	
West Palm Beach	Florida	WPXP-TV **	1998	2021	
West Palm Beach	Florida	WTVX	1995	1997	(Note: Owned by Whitehead Media.)
Honolulu	Hawaii	KPXO-TV **	1998	2021	
Boise	Idaho	KTRV-TV	2017	2021	
Evansville	Indiana	WAZE-LP	2014	2017	
Indianapolis	Indiana	WCLJ-TV	2018	2021	
Indianapolis	Indiana	WIPX-TV	2000	2021	
Decatur–Champaign–Springfield	Illinois	WPXU	1997	1999	
Lexington	Kentucky	WUPX-TV	2001	2021	
Shreveport	Louisiana	KPXJ	1997	2003	
Portland	Maine	WMPX-TV	1999	2003	
Detroit	Michigan	WPXD-TV	1998	2021	
Battle Creek–Grand Rapids–Lansing	Michigan	WZPX-TV **	1996	2021	
Rochester	Minnesota	KXLT-TV	1996	1997	
Kansas City	Missouri	KPXE-TV	1997	2021	
St. Louis	Missouri	WPXS	1998	2005	
Albuquerque	New Mexico	KAPX	1999	2003	
Albany–Schenectady	New York	WYPX-TV	1996	2021	
Buffalo	New York	WPXJ-TV **	1999	2021	
Jamestown	New York	WNYP-TV **	1966	1970	
Jamestown	New York	WXYJ	1963	1970	
Rochester	New York	WACK	1962	1972	
New York City	New York	WIPX	1996	1999	
Greensboro–High Point	North Carolina	WGPX-TV	1996	2021	
Akron–Cleveland	Ohio	WDLI-TV	2018	2021	
Akron–Cleveland	Ohio	WOAC	1995	1998	
Akron–Cleveland	Ohio	WVPX-TV	1996	2021	
Springfield–Dayton	Ohio	WDPX	1995	1999	
Oklahoma City	Oklahoma	KOPX-TV **	1996	2021	
San Juan	Puerto Rico	WJPX	1998	2000	
Providence	Rhode Island	WLWC	2018	2021	
Memphis	Tennessee	WPXX-TV	2008	2021	
Nashville	Tennessee	WGIC	1996	1998	(Note: Known as WHUB-FM prior to 1997.)
Nashville	Tennessee	WGSQ	1994	1998	
Nashville	Tennessee	WHUB	1996	1998	
Nashville	Tennessee	WPTN	1994	1998	
Salt Lake City	Utah	KUPX	1997	1999	
Norfolk–Hampton Roads	Virginia	WPXV-TV	1997	2021	
Spokane	Washington	KGPX-TV **	1999	2021	
Green Bay	Wisconsin	WPXG	1997	1999	

== See also ==
- List of Ion Television affiliates
- E. W. Scripps Company § Broadcasting
