= Seminole Sports Network =

Collegiate sports radio network

The Seminole Sports Network is a radio network carrying Florida State University Seminoles athletic events, operated by Legends. There are 19 stations in the network (12 on AM, 7 on FM) including 3 flagships.

== Current network stations ==
Station	Frequency	City	Format	Sports carried	Notes
WDYZ	660	Altamonte Springs, Florida	Talk	Football	Serves as the Orlando affiliate.
WBGE	101.9	Bainbridge, Georgia	Hot adult contemporary	Football	
WFNS	1350	Blackshear, Georgia	sports radio	Football	
WSFN	790	Brunswick, Georgia	sports radio	Football	
WBGF	93.5	Belle Glade, Florida	Spanish language	Football, basketball	
WNRP	1620	Gulf Breeze, Florida	talk	Football, basketball	Relayed on FM translators on 92.3 at Pensacola, & 95.3 at Brenton, Alabama.
WOKV	690	Jacksonville, Florida	sports	Football, basketball	
WONN	1430	Lakeland, Florida	Adult hits	Football	Also relayed via F.M. translators W240DB on 95.9 and W296CS on 107.1.
WDSR	1340	Lake City, Florida	Country music	Football	Relayed on F.M. via translator W240DU on 95.9 MHz.
WLBE	790	Leesburg, Florida	Full service	Basketball	
WJZS	106.1	Live Oak, Florida	sports	Football	
WJAQ	100.9	Marianna, Florida	Country	Football, basketball	
WIXC	1060	Melbourne, Florida	Spanish language sports	Football	
WFLA-FM	100.7	Midway, Florida	talk radio	Baseball	This is the only station to air baseball
WDBO	580	Orlando, Florida	News/talk	Basketball	Relayed on F.M. via translator W297BB on 107.3 MHz.
WXSR	101.5	Quincy, Florida	Rock	Basketball	Flagship
WJBR	1010	Seffner, Florida	Podcasts	Football, men's basketball	Repeated on WQYK-FM HD2; also translators on 92.1 at Tampa, & 103.1 at New Port Richey
WTNT-FM	94.9	Tallahassee, Florida	Country music	Football	Co-flagship with WTLY
WFTL	850	West Palm Beach, Florida	talk	Football, basketball	Relayed on WRMF-HD2
