= WQHL =

WQHL may refer to:

- WQHL (AM), a radio station (1250 AM) licensed to Live Oak, Florida, United States
- WQHL-FM, a radio station (98.1 FM) licensed to Live Oak, Florida, United States
