= Channel 62 =

Channel 62 in North America's former analogue NTSC-M system (UHF frequencies 759.25-763.75 MHz) is no longer in television use.

- A fictional analogue "U-62" appears in "UHF" ("Weird Al" Yankovic, 1989) as a struggling independent station.

== Canada ==
The following television stations operate on virtual channel 62 in Canada:

- CJNT-DT in Montreal, Quebec

== See also ==
- Channel 62 virtual TV stations in the United States
