= WTNT =

WTNT may refer to:

- WTNT (AM), a radio station (730 AM) licensed to Alexandria, Virginia, United States
- WTNT-FM, a radio station (94.9 FM) licensed to Tallahassee, Florida, United States
