= WLVO =

WLVO may refer to:

- WLVO (FM), a radio station (95.5 FM) licensed to serve Providence, Rhode Island, United States
- WLVO-LD, a low-power television station (channel 26, virtual 21) licensed to serve Cumming, Georgia, United States
- WKHW (FM), a radio station (88.5 FM) licensed to serve Halifax, Pennsylvania, United States, which held the call sign WLVO in 2017
- WFFY, a radio station (98.5 FM) licensed to serve San Carlos Park, Florida, United States, which held the call sign WLVO from 2014 to 2017
- WJZS, a radio station (106.1 FM) licensed to serve Live Oak, Florida, which held the call sign WLVO from 1991 to 2013
