= WFPX-TV =

Television station in Archer Lodge, North Carolina

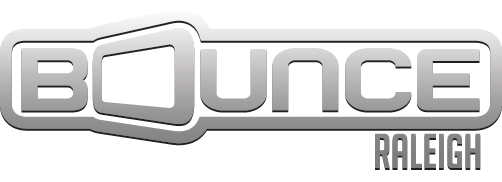
- Archer Lodge–Raleigh–; Durham, North Carolina; United States
- City: Archer Lodge, North Carolina (Note: Originally licensed to Fayetteville, North Carolina; moved to Archer Lodge in 2018.)
- Channels: Digital: 32 (UHF), shared with WRPX-TV; Virtual: 62
- Branding: Bounce TV Raleigh

Programming
- Affiliations: 62.1: Bounce TV

Ownership
- Owner: Ion Media; (Ion Media License Company, LLC)
- Sister stations: WRPX-TV

History
- Founded: September 14, 1981
- First air date: March 1985 (Note: The Broadcasting and Cable Yearbook says March 14, while the Television and Cable Factbook says March 4.)
- Former call signs: WFCT (1981–1993); WFAY (1993–1998); WFPX (1998–2009)
- Former channel numbers: Analog: 62 (UHF, 1985–2009); Digital: 36 (UHF, until 2018), 15 (UHF, 2018–2019)
- Former affiliations: Independent (1985–1994); NBC (via WPTF-TV, 1989); Fox (1994–1998); Ion Television (as satellite of WRPX-TV, 1998–2018); Ion Plus (2018–March 2021); Court TV (March–July 2021); Bounce TV (July 2021–May 2024); Scripps News (May–November 2024); Laff (November 2024–2025)
- Call sign meaning: Fayetteville's Pax TV (former affiliation)

Technical information
- Licensing authority: FCC
- Facility ID: 21245
- ERP: 170 kW
- HAAT: 563.8 m (1,850 ft)
- Transmitter coordinates: 35°49′52.8″N 78°8′42.8″W

Links
- Public license information: Public file; LMS

WFPX-TV (channel 62) is a television station licensed to Archer Lodge, North Carolina, United States, broadcasting the digital multicast network Bounce TV to the Research Triangle region. It is owned by the Ion Media subsidiary of the E. W. Scripps Company alongside Ion Television outlet WRPX-TV (channel 47). WFPX-TV and WRPX-TV share a sales office on Gresham Lake Road in Raleigh; through a channel sharing agreement, the two stations transmit using WRPX-TV's spectrum from a tower northeast of Middlesex, North Carolina.

Originally licensed to Fayetteville, North Carolina, WFPX served as a full-time satellite of WRPX-TV from 1998 until 2018. WFPX's signal covered areas of south-central North Carolina that received a marginal to non-existent signal from WRPX, although there was significant overlap between the two stations' contours otherwise. WFPX was a straight simulcast of WRPX; on-air references to WFPX were limited to Federal Communications Commission-mandated hourly station identifications during programming. Aside from its former transmitter, WFPX did not maintain any physical presence locally in Fayetteville.

== History ==
Channel 62 signed on in 1985 as WFCT in Fayetteville, North Carolina, an independent station owned by Fayetteville/Cumberland Telecasters. Attorneys Robinson and Katherine Everett of Durham, founders of WRDU-TV in Durham, along with WJKA in Wilmington and WGGT in Greensboro, were two of the principals in this company.

WFCT temporarily carried the programming of then-NBC affiliate WPTF-TV after that station's tower collapsed in an ice storm on December 10, 1989. The station changed call letters to WFAY in 1993 and became a Fox affiliate in 1994; the affiliation came as part of a deal that also saw the Everetts switch their CBS affiliates–WJKA and KECY-TV in El Centro, California–Yuma, Arizona–to Fox. Even though WFAY was located in the same market as WLFL (a Fox affiliate at the time), it mainly focused on communities located south of Fayetteville that did not get a good signal from WLFL. Some of its non-network programming was also simulcast to the Raleigh–Durham area on WRAY-TV for a couple of years in the mid-1990s until it was acquired by the Shop at Home network.

WFAY became WFPX and dropped Fox for the new Pax network after being bought out by Paxson Communications in the middle of 1998, shortly before WRAZ assumed the Fox affiliation for the Raleigh market. Later that year, newly minted Fox station WFXB out of the Florence–Myrtle Beach market expanded its signal to cover areas formerly served by WFAY. WFPX's signal was not seen at all in the northern portion of the Raleigh–Durham–Fayetteville market, but covered northern portions of the Florence–Myrtle Beach market, which did not have its own Ion Television affiliate until 2015, when WBTW added Ion on a digital subchannel following a deal made with Media General.

=== Channel-sharing agreement with WRPX ===
On April 4, 2017, WFPX was identified by the Federal Communications Commission as receiving $62.4 million for the spectrum reallocation auction. The station later entered into a channel-sharing arrangement with WRPX-TV. Since WRPX's signal does not reach Fayetteville, WFPX changed its city of license to Archer Lodge, east of Raleigh. After the channel share went into effect, WRPX-DT3, carrying Ion Life (later Ion Plus), took WFPX's 62.1 virtual channel, assuring that network market-wide must-carry over pay-TV systems. Since 2021, WFPX has aired various digital subchannel networks, all of them owned by Scripps Networks.

== Technical information ==
=== Subchannels ===
Subchannels of WRPX-TV and WFPX-TV
License	Subchannel	Res.	Short name	Programming
WRPX-TV	47.1	720p	ION	Ion Television
WRPX-TV	47.2	480i	CourtTV	Court TV
WRPX-TV	47.3	480i	IONPlus	Ion Plus
WRPX-TV	47.4	480i	GameSho	Game Show Central
WRPX-TV	47.5	480i	CRIME	True Crime Network
WRPX-TV	47.6	480i	BUSTED	Busted
WRPX-TV	47.8	480i	QVC	QVC
WFPX-TV	62.1	720p	Bounce	Bounce TV

=== Analog-to-digital conversion ===
WFPX-TV ended regular programming on its analog signal, over UHF channel 62, at noon on June 12, 2009, the official date on which full-power television stations in the United States transitioned from analog to digital broadcasts under federal mandate. The station's digital signal continued to broadcasts on its pre-transition UHF channel 36, using virtual channel 62.

=== Spectrum repack ===
WFPX-TV moved from channel 15 to channel 32 on September 11, 2019.

== Out-of-market coverage ==
In recent years, WFPX has been carried on cable in multiple areas within the Wilmington media market.
