= WOAC =

WOAC may refer to

- Wednesbury Old Athletic Club, defunct English football club
- WOAC (TV), a TV station in the Cleveland, OH market, now known as WRLM, which previously held the WOAC call letters from 1982-2009
