= 2024 Little League Softball World Series qualification =

Children's softball competition qualification

There were twelve Little League softball regional tournaments to qualify for the 2024 Little League Softball World Series in Greenville, North Carolina which took place between June 26 and July 30, 2024.

== Qualified Teams ==
Region	Location	Little League
Asia-Pacific	Bacolod, Philippines	Negros Occidental Little League
Canada	(Canada) Montreal, Quebec	On Field LLS Little League
Central	Austintown, Ohio	Austintown Little League
Europe-Africa	Bologna, Italy	Emilia Romagna Little League
Host (North Carolina)	Winterville, North Carolina	Pitt County Girls Softball Little League
Latin America	Monterrey, Mexico	Jose Gonzalez Torres Little League
Mid-Atlantic	Greensburg, Pennsylvania	West Point Little League
New England	Cranston, Rhode Island	Cranston Western Little League
Northwest	Eagle, Idaho	West Valley Little League
Southeast	Salisbury, North Carolina	Rowan County Little League
Southwest	Sterlington, Louisiana	Sterlington Little League
West	Willcox, Arizona	Willcox Little League

== United States tournaments ==
=== Central region ===
The tournament occurred in Whitestown, Indiana from July 21–26, 2024.

State	Location	Little League
Illinois	Clarendon Hills	Clarendon Hills Little League
Indiana	Floyds Knobs	Floyds Knobs Community Club Little League
Iowa	Johnston	Johnston Girls Softball Little League
Kentucky	Lebanon	Marion County Little League
Michigan	Midland	Midland Little League
Missouri	Columbia	Daniel Boone Little League
Nebraska	Omaha	Keystone Little League
North Dakota	Fargo	Fargo Little League
Ohio	Austintown	Austintown Little League
Wisconsin	Appleton	Appleton Little League

==== Bracket ====
Winner's First Round	Winner's Second Round	Winner's Semifinal	Upper Final	Championship Game
Nebraska (F/7)	4
Missouri	19	Missouri	5
Missouri	12
North Dakota	3
Illinois	1
Kentucky	0
Illinois	5
Missouri	5
Indiana	1
Iowa	0
Michigan	0	Indiana	3
Indiana	7
Indiana	1
Ohio	1
Ohio	3
Wisconsin	0	Missouri	2
Ohio	3
Elimination First Round	Elimination Second Round	Elimination Quarterfinal	Elimination Semifinal	Elimination Final
Nebraska (F/5)	0
Nebraska	6	Ohio	12	Indiana	1
Michigan	9	Michigan	4	Ohio	2	Ohio	3
Kentucky	2	Illinois	1
Iowa	0
Iowa(F/7)	10	Illinois	4
North Dakota (F/4)	0	Wisconsin	0
Wisconsin	10

=== Host region (North Carolina) ===
The North Carolina state tournament took place in Greenville, North Carolina from July 6–10. The winner of the North Carolina state tournament advanced to the Little League Softball World Series representing the Host Region. The winner of the elimination bracket advanced to the Southeast region tournament as the North Carolina Representative.

Location	Little League
Sylva	Great Smokies Little League
Archer Lodge	Johnson County Little League
Charlotte	Mallard Creek Little League
Winterville	Pitt County Girls Softball Little League
Salisbury	Rowan County Little League
Rutherfordton	Rutherford County Little League

==== Winner's bracket ====
First Round
(North Carolina) Pitt County	15
(North Carolina) Rutherford County	0
(North Carolina) Mallard Creek	3
(North Carolina) Johnson County	16

Semifinals
(North Carolina) Rowan County	1
(North Carolina) Pitt County	6
(North Carolina) Johnson County	12
(North Carolina) Great Smokies	0

Championship Game
(North Carolina) Pitt County	15
(North Carolina) Johnson County	0

==== Elimination Bracket ====
First Round
(North Carolina) Rutherford County	11
(North Carolina) Great Smokies	3
(North Carolina) Mallard Creek	2
(North Carolina) Rowan County	9

Semifinal
(North Carolina) Rutherford County	0
(North Carolina) Rowan County	16

Bracket Final
(North Carolina) Johnson County	4
(North Carolina) Rowan County	7

=== Mid-Atlantic region ===
The tournament took place in Bristol, Connecticut from July 21–26.

State	Location	Little League
Delaware	Middletown	MOT Little League
Maryland	Brunswick	Railroaders Little League
New Jersey	Whippany	Hanover Township Little League
(New York (state)) New York	Massapequa	Massapequa International Little League
Pennsylvania	Greensburg	West Point Little League
(Washington, D.C.) Washington, D.C.	Washington, D.C.	Mamie Johnson Little League

==== Bracket ====
Winner's First Round
(New York (state)) New York	10
Delaware	0
Maryland (F/4)	11
New Jersey	0
Elimination First Round
Delaware (F/4)	15
(Washington, D.C.) Washington, DC	0
New Jersey	0
(New York (state)) New York	3

Winner's Semifinal
Pennsylvania	6
(New York (state)) New York	0
(Washington, D.C.) Washington, DC	0
Maryland	6
Elimination Semifinal
Delaware	0
(New York (state)) New York	4

Winner's Bracket Final
Pennsylvania	3
Maryland	0
Elimination Bracket Final
Maryland	0
(New York (state)) New York	10

Championship Game
Pennsylvania	5
(New York (state)) New York	1

=== New England region ===
The tournament took place in Bristol, Connecticut from July 21–26.

State	Location	Little League
Connecticut	Milford	Milford Little League
Maine	Gorham	Gorham Little League
Massachusetts	Worcester	Jesse Burkett Little League
New Hampshire	Concord	Concord National Youth Softball Little League
Rhode Island	Cranston	Cranston Western Little League
Vermont	St. Albans	Champlain Little League

==== Bracket ====
Winner's First Round
Vermont (F/8)	0
Massachusetts	1
Connecticut (F/4)	3
Rhode Island	13
Elimination First Round
Vermont(F/11)	0
Maine	1
Connecticut (F/4)	15
New Hampshire	2

Winner's Semifinal
New Hampshire	0
Massachusetts	18
Maine	0
Rhode Island	11
Elimination Semifinal
Maine (F/4)	1
Connecticut	13

Winner's Bracket Final
Massachusetts	5
Rhode Island	6
Elimination Bracket Final
Massachusetts (F/5)	0
Connecticut	10

Championship Game
Rhode Island	6
Connecticut	3

=== Northwest region ===
The tournament took place in San Bernardino, California from July 20–26.

State	Location	Little League
Alaska	Sitka	Sitka Little League
Colorado	Monument	Tri Lakes Little League
Idaho	Eagle	West Valley Little League
Montana	Billings	Boulder Arrowhead Little League
Oregon	Union County	Union County Little League
(Washington (state)) Washington	Issaquah	Issaquah Little League
Wyoming	Gillette	Gillette Little League

==== Bracket ====
Winner's First Round	Winner's Second Round	Winner's Bracket Final	Championship Game
Oregon (F/4)	1
Idaho	13
Idaho (F/3)	20
Wyoming	1
Idaho	10
Montana	5
(Washington (state)) Washington	8
Colorado	5
(Washington (state)) Washington	1
Montana	3
Alaska	5
Montana	9
Idaho	10
Montana	0
Elimination First Round	Elimination Second Round	Elimination Semifinal	Elimination Bracket Final
Oregon (F/4)	2
Colorado (F/5)	16	Colorado	12	Montana	3
Alaska	6	Colorado	1	(Washington (state)) Washington	2
(Washington (state)) Washington	11
Wyoming (F/3)	0
(Washington (state)) Washington	19

=== Southeast Region ===
The tournament took place in Warner Robins, Georgia from July 21–26.

State	Location	Little League
Florida	Lake Mary	Lake Mary Little League
(Georgia (U.S. state)) Georgia	Cataula	Harris County Little League
North Carolina	Salisbury	Rowan County Little League
South Carolina	Taylors	Blue Ridge Little League
Tennessee	Clarksville	Saint Bethlehem Little League
Virginia	McLean	McLean Little League
West Virginia	Huntington	Hite Saunders Little League

==== Bracket ====
Winner's First Round	Winner's Second Round	Winner's Bracket Final	Championship Game
Tennessee	3
North Carolina	10
(Georgia (U.S. state)) Georgia (F/4)	0
North Carolina	12
North Carolina (F/4)	10
Florida	0
Florida	8
South Carolina	0
Florida (F/7)	4
Virginia	3
Virginia	14
West Virginia	0
North Carolina	9
Virginia	4
Elimination First Round	Elimination Second Round	Elimination Semifinal	Elimination Bracket Final
Tennessee	2
South Carolina	3	West Virginia	5	Florida	0
West Virginia	7	West Virginia	3	Virginia	10
Virginia	6
(Georgia (U.S. state)) Georgia	5
Virginia	8

=== Southwest region ===
The tournament took place in Waco, Texas from July 22–26.

State	Location	Little League
Louisiana	Sterlington	Sterlington Little League
New Mexico	Carlsbad	Carlsbad National Little League
Oklahoma	Edmond	Deer Creek Little League
Texas East	Columbus	Columbus Little League
Texas West	Alamo Heights	Alamo Heights Little League

==== Bracket ====
Winner's First Round
Texas West (F/3)	15
Oklahoma	0
Elimination First Round
Oklahoma (F/4)	1
Texas East	13

Winner's Semifinal
New Mexico (F/4)	0
Texas West	10
Louisiana	2
Texas East	0
Elimination Semifinal
Texas East	5
New Mexico	6

Winner's Bracket Final
Texas West	1
Louisiana	4
Elimination Bracket Final
Texas West	1
New Mexico	2

Championship Game
Louisiana	5
New Mexico	0

=== West region ===
The tournament took place in San Bernardino, California from July 20–26.

State	Location	Little League
Arizona	Willcox	Willcox Little League
Hawaii	Honolulu	Honolulu Little League
Nevada	Reno	Washoe Little League
Northern California	Dublin	Dublin Little League
Southern California	Quartz Hill	Quartz Hill Little League
Utah	Washington	Washington Little League

==== Bracket ====
Winner's First Round
Southern California	3
Northern California	7
Arizona	2
Nevada	0
Elimination First Round
Southern California (F/7)	7
Hawaii	8
Nevada	9
Utah	10

Winner's Semifinal
Utah	0
Northern California	12
Hawaii	0
Arizona	2
Elimination Semifinal
Hawaii	3
Utah	2

Winner's Bracket Final
Northern California	3
Arizona	6
Elimination Bracket Final
Northern California	6
Hawaii	2

Championship Game
Arizona	5
Northern California	0

== International tournaments ==
=== Asia-Pacific region ===
There was no Asia-Pacific tournament in 2024, and the regional championship was awarded to Negros Occidental Little League of Bacolod, Philippines.

=== Canada region ===
The tournament took place in Montreal from July 26–30.

Teams
Province	Location	Little League	Record
British Columbia	Victoria, British Columbia	Hampton Little League	3-0
Quebec	Montreal, Quebec	On Field LLS Little League	2-1
Alberta	St. Albert, Alberta	Capital Region Little League	1-2
Quebec (Host)	Montreal, Quebec	On Field LLS Little League	0-3

Semifinal			Final
			2	Quebec	5
3	Alberta	2	1	British Columbia	3
2	Quebec	6

=== Europe-Africa region ===
The tournament took place in Kutno, Poland from June 29–July 2.

==== Pool A ====
Teams
Country	City	Little League	Record
Italy	Bologna	Emilia Romagna Little League	3-0
Czech Republic Bohemia	Bohemia	Bohemia Little League	2-1
Poland Krośniewice	Krośniewice	Poland Krośniewice Little League	1-2
Netherlands	Alkmaar	Noor-Holland Little League	0-3

==== Pool B ====
Teams
Country	City	Little League	Record
Czech Republic Prague	Prague	Prague Little League	3-0
Germany	Munich	North/South-East/West Germany Little League	2-1
Ukraine	Kyiv	Kropivnicky/Kyiv/Rivne Little League	1-2
Poland Slask	Slask	Slask Little League	0-3

==== Semifinal & final ====
Semifinals
A1	Italy	26
B2	Germany	1
B1	Czech Republic Prague	7
A2	Czech Republic Bohemia	8

Finals
A1	Italy	7
A2	Czech Republic Bohemia	1

=== Latin America region ===
The tournament took place in Guanica, Puerto Rico from July 8–13.

Teams
Country	City	Little League	Record
Mexico	Monterrey	Jose Gonzalez Torres Little League	4-0
Puerto Rico	Guayama	Guayama Softball Little League	3-1
Puerto Rico (Host)	Guanica	Yankees Family Group Little League	2-2
United States Virgin Islands	St. Thomas	Elrod Hendricks West Little League	1-3
Cuba	La Palma	La Palma Softball Little League	0-4

==== Championship game ====
Finals
1	Mexico	5
2	Puerto Rico	0
