= Q101 =

Q101 may refer to:

- Archive Series No. 2: Live in Chicago Q101, a live broadcast 'studio' album released by Violent Femmes in 2006
- CKMQ-FM, Merritt, British Columbia, Canada
- KQDJ-FM, Valley City, North Dakota
- WKQX (FM), an alternative rock station in Chicago, Illinois
- WICO-FM, Snow Hill, Maryland (former incarnation)
- WJAQ, Marianna, Florida (former incarnation)
- WJDQ, Meridian, Mississippi
- WQPO, Harrisonburg, Virginia
- Q101 (internet radio), Chicago
- Q101 (New York City bus)
- Q100 (New York City bus) (formerly the Q101R)
- Quran 101, the 101st chapter of the Islamic Holy book
