= WRPX-TV =

Television station in Rocky Mount, North Carolina

- Rocky Mount–Raleigh–; Durham, North Carolina; United States
- City: Rocky Mount, North Carolina
- Channels: Digital: 32 (UHF), shared with WFPX-TV; Virtual: 47

Programming
- Affiliations: 47.1: Ion Television; for others, see § Subchannels

Ownership
- Owner: Ion Media; (Ion Television License, LLC)
- Sister stations: WFPX-TV

History
- Founded: March 26, 1991
- First air date: July 8, 1992
- Former call signs: WFXB (1991); WRMY (1991–1998); WRPX (1998–2009)
- Former channel numbers: Analog: 47 (UHF, 1992–2009); Digital: 15 (UHF, until 2019)
- Former affiliations: Independent (1992–1998)
- Call sign meaning: Raleigh's Pax TV

Technical information
- Licensing authority: FCC
- Facility ID: 20590
- ERP: 170 kW
- HAAT: 563.8 m (1,850 ft)
- Transmitter coordinates: 35°49′52.8″N 78°8′42.8″W

Links
- Public license information: Public file; LMS
- Website: iontelevision.com

WRPX-TV (channel 47) is a television station licensed to Rocky Mount, North Carolina, United States, broadcasting the Ion Television network to the Research Triangle region. It is owned by the Ion Media subsidiary of the E. W. Scripps Company alongside Bounce TV outlet WFPX-TV (channel 62). WRPX-TV and WFPX-TV share a sales office on Gresham Lake Road in Raleigh; through a channel sharing agreement, the two stations transmit using WRPX-TV's spectrum from a tower northeast of Middlesex, North Carolina.

WRPX's signal was previously relayed on WFPX; WRPX served the northern half of the market, including Raleigh, Durham and Chapel Hill, while WFPX served the southern part, including Fayetteville and Southern Pines.

== Technical information ==
=== Subchannels ===
Subchannels of WRPX-TV and WFPX-TV
License	Subchannel	Res.	Short name	Programming
WRPX-TV	47.1	720p	ION	Ion Television
WRPX-TV	47.2	480i	CourtTV	Court TV
WRPX-TV	47.3	480i	IONPlus	Ion Plus
WRPX-TV	47.4	480i	GameSho	Game Show Central
WRPX-TV	47.5	480i	CRIME	True Crime Network
WRPX-TV	47.6	480i	BUSTED	Busted
WRPX-TV	47.8	480i	QVC	QVC
WFPX-TV	62.1	720p	Bounce	Bounce TV

=== Analog-to-digital conversion ===
WRPX-TV ended regular programming on its analog signal, over UHF channel 47, at noon on June 12, 2009, the official date on which full-power television stations in the United States transitioned from analog to digital broadcasts under federal mandate. The station's digital signal continued to broadcasts on its pre-transition UHF channel 15, using virtual channel 47.

=== Spectrum repack ===
WRPX-TV moved from channel 15 to channel 32 on September 11, 2019.

== Out-of-market coverage ==
In recent years, WRPX-TV has been carried on cable in multiple areas within the Greenville and Wilmington media markets.
