= WINP-TV =

Television station in Pittsburgh

- Pittsburgh, Pennsylvania; United States
- Channels: Digital: 16 (UHF); Virtual: 16

Programming
- Affiliations: 16.1: Ion Television; for others, see § Subchannels

Ownership
- Owner: Ion Media; (Ion Media License Company, LLC)

History
- First air date: March 23, 1959
- Former call signs: WQEX (1959–2011)
- Former channel numbers: Analog: 16 (UHF, 1959–2009); Digital: 26 (UHF, until 2009), 38 (UHF, 2009–2020)
- Former affiliations: NET (1959–1961, 1963–1970); Dark (1961–1963, 1985–1986); PBS (1970–1985, 1986–2004); America's Store (2004–2007); ShopNBC (2007–2011)
- Call sign meaning: "Win Pittsburgh Over"

Technical information
- Licensing authority: FCC
- Facility ID: 41314
- ERP: 775 kW
- HAAT: 208 m (682 ft)
- Transmitter coordinates: 40°26′46.2″N 79°57′50.2″W

Links
- Public license information: Public file; LMS
- Website: iontelevision.com

WINP-TV (channel 16) is a television station in Pittsburgh, Pennsylvania, United States, airing programming from the Ion Television network. Owned by the Ion Media subsidiary of the E. W. Scripps Company, the station maintains transmitter facilities in Pittsburgh's Oakland neighborhood.

== History ==
=== Prior use of channel 16 in Pittsburgh ===
Channel 16 was initially activated August 29, 1953, as WENS, Pittsburgh's second UHF television station in the span of a month, with a primary ABC affiliation and secondary clearance of CBS network programs. In a market that was dominated by DuMont owned-and-operated station WDTV—indeed, two former WDTV sales managers started the station—it initially broke ground and provided Pittsburgh shows that had previously not been seen in the market. In 1955, a tower collapse led to an emergency 46-day channel-sharing operation with WQED (channel 13), Pittsburgh's educational television station, in a first-of-its-kind arrangement.

However, as with other UHF television stations, WENS struggled for acceptance by viewers and sponsors, even in a market that had just one local commercial VHF television station. After having fought the award of a second commercial VHF outlet to Pittsburgh, the station reached a settlement with WIIC-TV in early 1957 and ceased operations on August 31 of that year, one day before WIIC began broadcasting. The construction permit remained active through 1970 (being shifted to channel 22), but no station ever materialized.

=== WQEX ===
Immediately after the directors of WENS met on August 27, 1957, and decided to shutter the station, a delegation contacted WQED and offered the facilities to channel 13.

WQED purchased the WENS physical plant in 1958. Channel 22 was assigned to Pittsburgh from Clarksburg, West Virginia, in 1958, allowing for the re-designation of channel 16 as noncommercial.

WQED filed for a new construction permit, which was awarded in November 1958, and restarted the station, renamed WQEX, on March 23, 1959. WQED and WQEX formed the first legal television duopoly—at the time permitted only among noncommercial television stations—in the country. In order to allow schools to receive WQEX programs, WQED sent out a public plea soliciting donations of unused UHF converters owned by the public.

They ran Channel 16 by adding two 3/4-inch video tape machines and hooking them to an ancient transmitter.

— Ken Tiven, WQEX station manager, 1986

WQEX went dark again in November 1961 but returned to the air over a year later, in January 1963, after technical repairs were made. For much of its early years, owing to its educational status and the first-generation UHF equipment it inherited from WENS, the station was plagued by a weak signal, operating at 171 kilowatts visual, and 34.2 kilowatts aural by 1971, resulting in a Grade B signal over most of Pittsburgh. Viewers in the city's outlying suburbs that were unable to receive the station clearly on cable received a spotty-to-non-existent signal. In effect, the station was perceived by the general public as an afterthought.

WQEX was the last station in Pittsburgh, and probably the last in North America, to convert to color. For decades, the station had broadcast with WENS's black-and-white transmitter. However, on March 10, 1985, the transmitter broke down completely, and the parts required to fix it were no longer available. WQED decided to take the station completely silent, and channel 13 launched a pledge drive to raise the $4.5 million necessary to reconstruct the channel 16 facility.

The new WQEX was set up as an almost autonomous station within the WQED organization. A new, more powerful NEC color transmitter was installed for testing over the summer of 1986 at an authorized power increase to 660 kW visual, and 66 kW aural. WQEX took over Studio C in the WQED premises and built its entire studio, offices and technical space within the 28-by-32-foot area. It took six months from April 1, 1986, until launch on October 16, 1986, to build the station, train the personnel and organize the programming, all of this under the direction of Kenneth Tiven as general manager. The result was a station unlike any other in the PBS system, technically and in programming.

The new WQEX was then one of the most automated stations in the world. It adopted the Betacart player for airing all of its programs—even programs longer than the 30-minute recording limit of the format; the programs were spread across overlapping tapes. Local programming by its competitors had been delivered on film, reel videotape and U-matic videocassettes. The Betacam professional format produced a high-quality picture with crisp on-air resolution. In addition, the station used a database system for program playout, which controlled the Betacart machine.

In its return to the air, WQEX's schedule resembled that of a commercial independent station, with themed nights, reruns, movies and British situation comedies (often called "Britcoms"), reflecting a move then by some PBS stations to adopt a more "middlebrow" image appealing to a larger audience than those of cultural and educational-minded viewers (and thus potentially generating more donor income). The station even had on-camera hosts.

From 1986 through 1990, the station's idiosyncratic persona stayed intact. It produced a 10 p.m. news program from Monday through Friday, in conjunction with the reporting staff of the Pittsburgh Post-Gazette newspaper; reporters were debriefed about their stories, and these video clips were then played back in the Betacart automation system as a complete program. This innovation, called "modular production," later became the keystone of several television news channels, including the now-defunct Orange County Newschannel (OCN), which Tiven departed WQEX to start in 1990.

When funding became tight in the mid-1990s due to economic and political changes from the early years of public broadcasting, WQED began using WQEX to simulcast its own programming as of November 1, 1997, to cut expenses; some of the programming formerly exclusive to WQEX was consolidated into the WQED lineup at that time.

=== Financial troubles and transition to commercial license ===
Due to a combination of high costs of continuing national programming production, bloated payroll expenses, and what the station's critics identified as a top-heavy management structure and a long history of mismanagement, WQED's total liabilities at one point had mounted beyond $10 million. Station debts were being paid four months behind schedule and approximately 100 of the 220 staff jobs at WQED were abruptly eliminated. A station once respected for having originated programming such as Mister Rogers' Neighborhood and National Geographic specials was quickly finding itself relegated to the role of a primarily-local producer of educational programming.

WQED began to seek a removal of the non-commercial educational status which restricted the WQEX license as early as 1996, with the intention of selling the secondary UHF station outright in the hope that an infusion of cash would solve some of the financial woes of the main station. WQED's initial application to take WQEX commercial was rejected outright by the Federal Communications Commission, leaving it to pursue an alternate plan by which the station was almost sold to religious broadcaster Cornerstone Television in 1999. The original plan was to move WPCB-TV from channel 40 (a commercial license) to channel 16 (non-commercial educational WQEX), with Paxson Communications buying channel 40 and converting it to a Pax TV affiliate with the call letters WKPX-TV. This move, which would have led to a $35 million payout being split equally between Cornerstone and WQED, was approved conditionally by the FCC in 2000, allegedly after lobbying by Republican Senator John McCain on behalf of Pax president Lowell Paxson, an intervention which Senator McCain would later deny having made. However, in response to vociferous concerns from members of the Pittsburgh local community, the FCC did impose one condition on the sale: half of Cornerstone's programming needed to be of educational value, effectively respecting the non-commercial educational condition of WQEX's existing license.

Cornerstone flatly refused, abruptly backing out of the proposed deal. Religious programming did not qualify as educational if it was "primarily devoted to religious exhortation, proselytizing or statements of personally held religious views or beliefs," according to the FCC's ruling conditionally allowing religious broadcaster Cornerstone Television to take over WQEX and add educational content to the station. Cornerstone objected to those restrictions, insisting that its religious doctrine required proselytization on most if not all of its programming. Although the FCC abruptly reversed its position less than a month later removing the condition in response to intense political and legislative pressure (mainly from Republican sympathizers with the Religious Right), Cornerstone withdrew its application and the sale was cancelled, keeping WQEX as a WQED simulcast.

In July 2002, the FCC abandoned its long-held position on instructional content, removing WQEX's non-commercial educational status outright in response to continued claims of economic hardship by WQED—hardships which the station had long blamed not on its own past management practices, but on the local economic situation and the long-term decline of Pittsburgh's industrial base, situations that were plausible in the 1980s and 1990s but had largely subsided by the 2000s.

From 2004 to March 2007, WQEX brokered much of its airtime to America's Store, a discount shopping channel from the Home Shopping Network, along with repeats of WQED's news magazine, OnQ, on Monday mornings. This was an attempt to use the frequency to generate income for WQED instead of being a redundant facility, in effect making WQEX a for-profit operation. In January 2007, America's Store announced it would cease operations on April 3 of that year; WQEX switched its programming to ShopNBC on March 26. Rumors and actual proposals of a sale of WQEX came up from time to time, the most noteworthy of which was a proposed 2002 sale to Shooting Star Broadcasting, a company headed up by Pittsburgh native and former Shamrock Broadcasting president Diane Sutter, that was never consummated.

=== Sale to Ion Media ===
On November 8, 2010, WQED entered into a deal with Ion Media (the former Paxson Communications) to sell WQEX to Ion for $3 million. The sale was finalized (after FCC approval), on May 2, 2011, at which time the station's call sign changed from WQEX to WINP-TV, making it the first Ion-owned station without the Pax-era "PX" in its call sign; the calls stood for "Win Pittsburgh Over". WINP-TV continued to carry ShopNBC programming to fill the WQEX contractual obligations; however, on October 1, 2011, it began carrying Ion Television on its main channel, with Ion Life and Qubo on subchannels. This was the network's first over-the-air presence in Pittsburgh, the largest media market in which Ion and its predecessors had never had an over-the-air signal (Pittsburgh was the 24th largest television market in the U.S. during 2010–2011, according to AC Nielsen).

After Sinclair Broadcast Group, owner of Fox affiliate WPGH-TV, announced their attempted $3.9 billion purchase of Tribune Media in May 2017, reports emerged of Fox Television Stations negotiating with Ion Media to create a joint venture that could potentially turn WINP-TV and other Ion-owned stations into replacement Fox affiliates. The negotiations were rendered moot by October 2017 after Ion elected its stations to have must-carry status over cable instead of through retransmission consent.

=== Sale to Scripps ===
On September 24, 2020, the Cincinnati-based E. W. Scripps Company announced it would purchase Ion Media Networks for $2.65 billion, with financing from Berkshire Hathaway. With this purchase, Scripps divested 23 Ion-owned stations. The divestitures allowed the merged company to fully comply with the FCC local and national ownership regulations. The sale was completed on January 7, 2021.

Ultimately, Scripps decided to keep WINP-TV, marking one of Scripps's first broadcasting properties in Pennsylvania (alongside existing sister stations WPPX-TV in Philadelphia and WQPX-TV in Wilkes-Barre–Scranton), as well as a return to the Pittsburgh market after a near-30-year absence when Scripps sold the publication rights to The Pittsburgh Press to Block Communications (owners of the Pittsburgh Post-Gazette) during a publication strike that ultimately saw the Press shut down completely.

In October 2021, Scripps notified the FCC it had closed local facilities for WINP-TV and other Ion Media stations (with those in duopoly markets having their operations consolidated with existing Scripps stations), and consolidated the regulatory 'studios' for all of the stations at Scripps Center in Cincinnati where Scripps and WCPO-TV are headquartered. The network's operations remain based out of West Palm Beach.

== Technical information ==
=== Subchannels ===
The station's signal is multiplexed:

Subchannels of WINP-TV
| Subchannel | Res. | Short name | Programming |
|---|---|---|---|
| 16.1 | 720p | ION | Ion Television |
| 16.2 | 720p | Bounce | Bounce TV |
| 16.3 | 480i | Mystery | Ion Mystery |
| 16.4 | 480i | IONPlus | Ion Plus |
| 16.5 | 480i | BUSTED | Busted |
| 16.6 | 480i | GameSho | Game Show Central |
| 16.7 | 480i | QVC | QVC |
| 16.8 | 480i | HSN | HSN |

=== Analog-to-digital conversion ===
WINP (as WQEX) shut down its analog signal, over UHF channel 16, on February 17, 2009, the original target date on which full-power television stations in the United States were to transition from analog to digital broadcasts under federal mandate; the deadline had later been extended to June 12.

Sometime between April 1 and the new June 12 deadline, the station moved its digital signal from its pre-transition UHF channel 26 to channel 38; channel 38 was used for the digital signal of now-former sister station WQED until April 1 after the end of its annual PBS pledge drive in March. The early signoff for WQED gave the station time to move its own digital signal to channel 13. Digital television receivers display WINP's virtual channel as its former UHF analog channel 16. WQEX was one of three stations in the Pittsburgh market to shut down their analog signals on the original transition date, alongside the Sinclair Broadcast Group duopoly of WPGH-TV and WPMY.
