= WQHL (AM) =

- Live Oak, Florida; United States
- Frequency: 1250 kHz
- Branding: The BIG Talker

Programming
- Format: News Talk Information
- Affiliations: Premiere Networks; Fox News Radio

Ownership
- Owner: Southern Stone Communications; (Southern Communications, LLC)
- Sister stations: WDSR, WQHL-FM, WJZS, WCJX, WNFB

History
- First air date: June 16, 1949 (as WNER)
- Former call signs: WNER (1949–1988)

Technical information
- Licensing authority: FCC
- Facility ID: 15872
- Class: D
- Power: 1,000 watts (day); 83 watts (night)
- Transmitter coordinates: 30°17′14″N 82°57′56″W
- Translator: (103.1 MHz) W276DI (Live Oak)

Links
- Public license information: Public file; LMS

WQHL (1250 AM) is a News Talk Information–formatted radio station licensed to Live Oak, Florida, United States. The station operates under the branding The BIG Talker in simulcast with Lake City–licensed WDSR (1340 AM). The station is owned by Southern Stone Communications as part of a conglomerate with Live Oak–licensed country music station WQHL-FM (98.1 FM), Live Oak–licensed sports radio station WJZS (106.1 FM), and Five Points–licensed hot adult contemporary station WCJX (106.5 FM); WQHL is also sister to WDSR and Lake City–licensed classic hits station WNFB (94.3 FM) under a local marketing agreement with their owner Newman Media, Inc.

== History ==
WQHL went on the air as WNER in 1949. In 1953, the station was purchased by Norm Protsman. He would later purchase WQHL-FM (98.1 FM). In 1988, Protsman sold the two stations to Day Communications.

In 2013, the WQHL stations were sold by Black Crow Media Group to Southern Stone Communications.

== Programming ==
WDSR/WQHL currently feature syndicated programming from Premiere Networks, including The Clay Travis and Buck Sexton Show and The Sean Hannity Show. The station also airs news programming from Fox News Radio.

== Translator ==
WQHL operates an FM translator in the local Live Oak area:

Broadcast translator for WQHL
Call sign	Frequency	City of license	FID	ERP (W)	HAAT	Class	Transmitter coordinates	FCC info
W276DI	103.1 FM	Live Oak, Florida	200546	250	148 m (486 ft)	D	30°17′14.8″N 82°57′55.5″W	LMS
