= WRAY-TV =

Television station in Wake Forest, North Carolina

- Wake Forest–Raleigh–; Durham, North Carolina; United States
- City: Wake Forest, North Carolina (Note: Originally licensed to Wilson, North Carolina; moved to Wake Forest in 2018.)
- Channels: Digital: 20 (UHF), shared with WUNC-TV; Virtual: 30

Programming
- Affiliations: 30.1: TCT

Ownership
- Owner: Total Christian Television; (Radiant Life Ministries, Inc.)
- Sister stations: WLXI

History
- First air date: August 7, 1995
- Former channel numbers: Analog: 30 (UHF, 1995–2009); Digital: 42 (UHF, until 2018), 25 (UHF, 2018–2019)
- Former affiliations: Independent (1995–1997, 2006–2010); Global Shopping Network (1997–1998); Shop at Home (1998–2006)

Technical information
- Licensing authority: FCC
- Facility ID: 10133
- ERP: 1,000 kW
- HAAT: 461.9 m (1,515 ft)
- Transmitter coordinates: 35°51′59″N 79°10′0.5″W

Links
- Public license information: Public file; LMS
- Website: www.tct.tv

WRAY-TV (channel 30) is a religious television station licensed to Wake Forest, North Carolina, United States, serving the Research Triangle region. The station is owned by Total Christian Television (TCT). WRAY-TV's transmitter is located on Terrells Mountain near Chapel Hill. The station maintained studios on Expressway Drive in Wilson until TCT ended local operations in June 2018.

== History ==
The station was given the call letters WEOU on February 18, 1992. However, the station was granted a license on April 14, 1995. It signed on August 7 as WRAY-TV, originally licensed to Wilson, North Carolina, and was initially a semi-satellite of WFAY (channel 62; now WFPX-TV), at that time Fayetteville's Fox affiliate; however, the station operated as an independent station, as its signal overlapped with WLFL, at that time Raleigh's Fox affiliate. WRAY's programming changed more towards home shopping upon its sale to Ramcast Corporation in 1997; Ramcast quickly merged with the Global Shopping Network to become Global Broadcasting Systems, Inc. However, Global Broadcasting Systems soon ran into financial trouble, and filed for Chapter 11 bankruptcy on June 26, 1997. Its assets, including WRAY, were sold to the rival Shop at Home Network in 1998.

On May 16, 2006, Shop at Home parent the E. W. Scripps Company announced that the network would be suspending operations, effective June 22, 2006. However, it temporarily ceased operations on June 21, and WRAY switched to Jewelry Television (and, on June 23, a mixture of both networks), which remained until Scripps found a buyer for its stations.

On September 26, 2006, Scripps announced that it was selling its Shop at Home stations, including WRAY, to Multicultural Television of New York City for $170 million. The sale of WRAY and sister stations KCNS in San Francisco and WOAC in Cleveland was completed on December 20, 2006. Soon after the sale, all Shop at Home programming ceased in favor of a schedule consisting primarily of infomercials.

After Multicultural ran into financial problems and defaulted on its loans, the station was placed into a trust; in October 2009, a sale of WRAY-TV to Marion, Illinois–based Total Christian Television (via subsidiary Radiant Light Ministries, which had earlier acquired WOAC from the trust), a chain of Christian television stations, was announced.

WRAY-TV ended regular programming on its analog signal, over UHF channel 30, on February 17, 2009, the original target date on which full-power television stations in the United States were to transition from analog to digital broadcasts under federal mandate (which was later pushed back to June 12, 2009). The station's digital signal continued to broadcast on its pre-transition UHF channel 42, using virtual channel 30.

On April 4, 2017, WRAY was identified by the Federal Communications Commission (FCC) as receiving $41 million for the spectrum reallocation auction. WRAY changed its city of license to Wake Forest, North Carolina, and entered into a channel-sharing arrangement with WUNC-TV, along with sister station WLXI. With the 2018 FCC repeal of the Main Studio Rule, WRAY-TV's studio in Wilson was closed as part of a nationwide restructuring of TCT's operations into one hub from its Illinois base.

== Subchannels ==
Subchannels of WUNC-TV/WUNL-TV and WRAY-TV/WLXI
License	Subchannel	Res.	Short name	Programming
WUNC-TV/WUNL-TV	4.1/26.1	1080i	PBS NC	PBS
WUNC-TV/WUNL-TV	4.2/26.2	480i	ROOTLE	PBS Kids
WUNC-TV/WUNL-TV	4.3/26.3	480i	UNC-EX	The Explorer Channel
WUNC-TV/WUNL-TV	4.4/26.4	480i	NCCHL	The North Carolina Channel
WRAY-TV/WLXI	30.1/43.1	1080i	WRAY/WLXI	TCT
