= WGMY =

- Thomasville, Georgia; United States
- Broadcast area: Tallahassee, Florida
- Frequency: 107.1 MHz (HD Radio)
- Branding: 107.1 Kiss FM

Programming
- Format: Top 40 (CHR)
- Subchannels: HD2: 105.3 The Beat (mainstream urban); HD3: BIN 100.3 (Black-oriented news)
- Affiliations: Premiere Networks

Ownership
- Owner: iHeartMedia, Inc.; (iHM Licenses, LLC)
- Sister stations: WTLY; WXSR; WFLA-FM; WTNT-FM

History
- First air date: 1971 (as WLOR-FM)
- Former call signs: WLOR-FM (1971–1990); WSTT-FM (1990–1991); WSNI (1991–1998); WOKL (1998–1999); WTLY (1999–2009)
- Call sign meaning: Station branded as My 107.1

Technical information
- Licensing authority: FCC
- Facility ID: 61250
- Class: C1
- ERP: 100,000 watts
- HAAT: 251 meters (823 ft)
- Transmitter coordinates: 30°35′12″N 84°14′11″W
- Translators: HD2: 105.3 W287CO (Tallahassee, Florida); HD3: 100.3 W262CC (Tallahassee, Florida)

Links
- Public license information: Public file; LMS
- Webcast: Listen live (via iHeartRadio); HD2: Listen live (via iHeartRadio); HD3: Listen live (via iHeartRadio)
- Website: kissfm1071.iheart.com; HD2: beat1053.iheart.com; HD3: tallahassee.binnews.com

WGMY (107.1 FM) is a rhythmic-leaning contemporary hit radio station in the Tallahassee, Florida, market owned by iHeartMedia. Its studios and transmitter are located separately on the northside of Tallahassee.

== History ==
The station's original call-letters were WLOR-FM - LOR for "Land of Roses". It morphed into country formatted "South 107" with call letters WSTT serving Thomasville and Thomas County, Georgia. In 1990, the station was granted an upgrade to full C1 status. Its new 100,000-watt signal from the tower of Tallahassee's WTWC-TV, between Tallahassee and Thomasville, gave the station full Tallahassee market coverage. The station's studios moved to NE Capital Circle in Tallahassee and the call letters were changed to WSNI for Sunny 107. The new format was 1960s and 1970s based oldies - a format that had not been done live in the Tallahassee market.

Bob Walker from WCKT in Ft. Myers was hired as the station's first PD. Bob and Carol Chastain from sister station WTSH-FM in Rome, Georgia, were the first morning team. Joe Chrysdale formerly of Florida Radio Networks was the first midday jock and April Crowley formerly of WGLF later assumed the shift. Dan Murray from WCGQ in Columbus, Georgia, was the afternoon drive talent, Charles Kinney from WPAP in Panama City hosted nights and James "The General" Sherman hosted over-nights.

When Chastain left to host mid-days at cross-town Kix 100, market veteran Sara Michaels who had co-hosted mornings at WBGM (now WBZE) before moving to Detroit to work for ABC news - was hired to co-host mornings with Walker. The new "Bob and Sara in the Morning" program included Tim Bryant from WJAD in Bainbridge and former WCTV sports anchor Jim Loftus hosting sports. The show endeared itself to listeners while Michael's toddler daughter underwent open-heart surgery. Michaels shared on-going details with WSNI listeners and talked about the strength of community she and her family felt from their thoughts and prayers.

In 1997, the station was sold to Paxson Communications and soon after to Clear Channel Communications (forerunner to iHeartMedia). Studios were moved to the John Knox Road location and the station's "Sunny" name was dropped in favor of "Cool 107", WOKL. Steven Christian from crosstown Z-Rock 106, now WQTL, replaced Bob Walker as morning show host. Steve and Sara continued the strong morning show tradition even as Clear Channel Communications morphed the station to soft adult contemporary as Magic 107.1 with new call letters WTLY.

In 2009 the station began using the popular "My" moniker as "My 107.1" WGMY with syndicated morning show host Elvis Duran and a hot adult contemporary music format.

On September 16, 2011, WGMY changed its format to contemporary hit radio, branded as "107.1 Hit Music Now". On February 14, 2014, WGMY rebranded as "107.1 Kiss FM".

On June 13, 2022, WGMY added the Black Information Network to its HD3 subchannel, fed by W262CC on 100.3.

== Notable alumni ==
- Bob Walker
- Sara Michaels
- Steve Christian
- Jason Taylor
- April Crowley
- Dan Murray
- Charles Kinney
- Jeff Horn
- Tim Bryant
- Jim Loftus
- Jonathan Reed
- "Uncle" Chuck Ryor
- Christine Seymour
- Steve Michaels
- Jon Edwards
- James "The General" Sherman
