= WTAL =

- Tallahassee, Florida; United States
- Broadcast area: Tallahassee metropolitan area
- Frequency: 1450 kHz
- Branding: Hallelujah 95.3

Programming
- Format: Gospel
- Affiliations: American Urban Radio Networks

Ownership
- Owner: Live Communications, Inc.

History
- First air date: 1946
- Former call signs: WRHP (1946–1949); WTNT (1949–1962)
- Call sign meaning: Tallahassee

Technical information
- Licensing authority: FCC
- Facility ID: 55330
- Class: C
- Power: 1,000 watts
- Transmitter coordinates: 30°25′45″N 84°19′43″W
- Translator: 95.3 W237FB (Tallahassee)

Links
- Public license information: Public file; LMS
- Webcast: Listen live
- Website: www.wtal1450.com

WTAL (1450 AM) is a radio station broadcasting a gospel format. WTAL is licensed to Tallahassee, Florida, United States, and serves the Tallahassee metropolitan area. The station is currently owned by Live Communications, Inc. and features weekday afternoon and Sunday programming.

== History ==
The station was first licensed November 19, 1946, as WRHP; it became WTNT on November 1, 1949. In 1962, WTNT's owners acquired WTAL (1270 AM) and moved to that facility; the 1450 facility then received the WTAL call sign on December 1.
