= WCJX =

Radio station in Five Points–Lake City, Florida

- Five Points, Florida; United States
- Broadcast area: Lake City/Live Oak
- Frequency: 106.5 MHz
- Branding: Mix 106.5

Programming
- Format: Hot AC

Ownership
- Owner: Southern Stone Communications; (Southern Communications, LLC)
- Sister stations: WQHL, WQHL-FM, WJZS, WDSR, WNFB

History
- First air date: 1998

Technical information
- Licensing authority: FCC
- Facility ID: 9033
- Class: A
- ERP: 3,800 watts
- HAAT: 104 meters (341 ft)
- Transmitter coordinates: 30°15′14.00″N 82°40′56.00″W

Links
- Public license information: Public file; LMS

WCJX (106.5 FM) is a hot adult contemporary–formatted radio station licensed to Five Points, Florida, United States, and primarily serving the Lake City and Live Oak area. The station is owned by Southern Stone Communications as part of a conglomerate with Live Oak–licensed News Talk Information station WQHL (1250 AM), Live Oak–licensed country music station WQHL-FM (98.1 FM), and Live Oak–licensed sports radio station WJZS; WCJX is also sister to Lake City–licensed News Talk Information station WDSR (1340 AM) and Lake City–licensed classic hits station WNFB (94.3 FM) under a local marketing agreement with their owner Newman Media, Inc.

== History ==
Former logo.

WCJX previously broadcast a classic hits format under the branding 106.5 The X and later 106.5 The Lake. On December 26, 2022, WCJX swapped formats with WNFB. WNFB inherited WCJX's classic hits format and The Lake branding, while WCJX took on 94.3's hot adult contemporary format and Mix branding.
