= WJZS =

- Live Oak, Florida; United States
- Broadcast area: Lake City/Live Oak
- Frequency: 106.1 MHz
- Branding: Fox Sports 106.1

Programming
- Format: Sports
- Affiliations: Fox Sports Radio; Florida Sports Network; Jaguars Radio Network; Seminole Sports Network

Ownership
- Owner: Southern Stone Communications; (Southern Communications, LLC)
- Sister stations: WQHL, WQHL-FM, WCJX, WDSR, WNFB

History
- First air date: September 6, 1991 (as WLVO)
- Former call signs: WLVO (1991–2004); DWLVO (2004–2007); WLVO (2007–2013)

Technical information
- Licensing authority: FCC
- Facility ID: 37060
- Class: A
- ERP: 2,600 watts
- HAAT: 152 meters
- Transmitter coordinates: 30°13′7.00″N 82°59′26.00″W

Links
- Public license information: Public file; LMS

WJZS (106.1 FM) is a Fox Sports Radio–affiliated sports–formatted radio station licensed to Live Oak, Florida, United States, and also serving nearby Lake City. The station is owned by Southern Stone Communications as part of a conglomerate with Live Oak–licensed News Talk Information station WQHL (1250 AM), Live Oak–licensed country music station WQHL-FM (98.1 FM) and Five Points–licensed hot adult contemporary station WCJX (106.5 FM). WJZS is also sister to two Lake City–licensed stations, News Talk Information WDSR (1340 AM) and classic hits WNFB (94.3 FM) through a local marketing agreement with their owner Newman Media, Inc.

== History ==
The station went on the air as WLVO on September 6, 1991. On August 31, 2004, the station changed its call sign to DWLVO, and on August 2, 2007, back to WLVO. The station, which at the time broadcast a classic hits format, quit on January 14, 2012, after station owner Leon Pettersen, due to illness, was not able to operate the station to FCC requirements.

On January 4, 2013, WLVO returned to the air with a contemporary Christian format. On October 1, 2013, the station changed its call sign to the current WJZS. Effective October 1, 2014, WJZS was sold to Newman Broadcasting, Inc. for $2,500.

Effective February 1, 2018, Newman Broadcasting sold WJZS to current owner Southern Stone Communications for $5,000.

WJZS previously broadcast a News Talk Information format in simulcast with Lake City–licensed and Fred Dockins–owned WJTK (96.5 FM). That has since been swapped for a sports radio format.

== Programming ==
WJZS is primarily an affiliate of Fox Sports Radio, airing many of its programs, including The Dan Patrick Show and The Herd with Colin Cowherd. The station also airs a regional sports morning show, Miller and Moulton, from the Florida Sports Network. WJZS also airs Jacksonville Jaguars NFL games via the Jaguars Radio Network and Florida State Seminoles football games from the Seminole Sports Network.
