= Channel 62 virtual TV stations in the United States =

The following television stations operate on virtual channel 62 in the United States:

- KAKW-DT in Killeen, Texas
- KOPX-TV in Oklahoma City, Oklahoma
- KRCA in Riverside, California
- KSMO-TV in Kansas City, Missouri
- KZOD-LD in Odessa, Texas
- WDMI-LD in Minneapolis, Minnesota
- WFPT in Frederick, Maryland
- WFPX-TV in Fayetteville, North Carolina
- WFTT-TV in Venice, Florida
- WJYS in Hammond, Indiana
- WMFP in Lawrence, Massachusetts
- WWJ-TV in Detroit, Michigan
- WWSI in Atlantic City, New Jersey
- WYCW in Asheville, North Carolina
- WYFX-LD in Youngstown, Ohio
