= Shop at Home Network =

American television network

- Country: United States
- Broadcast area: Nationwide

Ownership
- Owner: Multimedia Commerce Group

History
- Launched: 1987
- Closed: March 8, 2008 (21 years, 2 months and 7 days)

The Shop at Home Network (also called Shop at Home, Shop at Home TV and SATH) was a television network in the United States, owned and operated by the E. W. Scripps Company from 2002 to 2006, then by Jewelry Television. It primarily aired home shopping programming. During Scripps' ownership, some shows simulcast on sister channels (such as Food Network).

== History ==
Shop At Home (SATH (Shop At The Home) stock symbol) was started by Joe Overholt in the middle 1980s. Located in a strip mall just off of Interstate 40 in Newport, Tennessee, the original programs were taped in segments and mailed to head-end origination studios to be played when time was available on satellite. The low budget production was aired over unused satellite transponders to an audience who had large satellite dishes installed at their houses. It soon became apparent that these inconsistent excursions would not make a shopping channel successful. After pulling together some very limited funding from a few East Tennessee businesspeople, SAH began the search for affordable satellite distribution time.

=== Early operations ===
The technical difficulties caused by the hills and valleys of East Tennessee and prohibitive cost-per-mile across the vast expanses of the rural flatlands west of the Mississippi had created a pent up demand for television programing. Homeowners, many of whom had no access to cable and a minimal number of off-air television channels, were looking for a way to receive some of the same programs their urban cousins had access to. Since Overholt and a few others in the Knoxville area were in the process of pioneering the satellite to home backyard dish concept, it was logical to search for the programming to go along with it. The first shopping channel (Home Shopping Network) had just appeared out of Florida, so the network was launched as a rival. The ability to reach this entertainment-starved market was important to the fledgling experiment, and this market's appreciation and monetary encouragement was key to SAH's progress. The beginnings of today's satellite television as an industry began by providing the dish and electronics to receive the signals from satellites in space, which coincidentally was the same way that HBO and other entertainment was distributed to cable systems across the country. The Knoxville group that Overholt approached had formed the "Satellite TV Awareness Association" (STAA), a local trade organization whose purpose was to inform citizens and elected representatives to Congress of the issues surrounding the "business" of the new industry. The cable lobby had portrayed backyard dish owners as pirates and accused them of stealing their programming. The STAA (Overholt was a member) and others made it public that offers had been made to the programmers to pay for the product being received, but most programmers had refused the "offer to pay". The STAA sought assistance from their elected representatives, of which Al Gore was one, for a fair solution to the problem. Gore was conducting local town hall meetings and had a sympathetic ear for this grassroots movement from his constituents. A few months later, when the STAA decided to bring the issues to dish owners, they used the same satellite signal to do so. From a rented studio in Nashville, they hired a local MC to host a panel of "experts" in the field to answer questions and propose solutions to the dish industries problems. Gore was unable to attend in person, but had pledged his support and participated in the event via telephone.

=== JD Clinton acquires the network ===
In 1987, the company sold shares and became a penny stock listed in the pink sheets as SATH. By 1993, the company was struggling to attain profitability. Paul Cowell, the majority shareholder, sold the company to venture capitalist JD Clinton and his partners. Kent Lillie moved from General Manager of Fox TV in Atlanta to become the CEO. Under new leadership, the company moved to a new campus in Nashville, Tennessee and opened a state-of-the-art digital production/broadcast facility with studios and an in-house call center. Shop at Home became a cable and broadcast media company, purchasing cable time and acquiring television stations. Under the FCC rules, all local cable companies "must carry" local programming at no charge to a local broadcaster. Using this must carry rule to obtain broad market 24-hour coverage of its programming, Shop at Home acquired stations in Bridgeport, Connecticut/New York City, Lawrence/Boston, Massachusetts, San Francisco, California, Wilson/Raleigh, North Carolina, Canton/Cleveland, Ohio, and Houston, Texas. Shop at Home built coverage into approximately 100 million households. Expanding this audience drove the revenue and gave the opportunity for product volume and profitability. With growth came a listing of SATH on NASDAQ and expansion of management.

=== Successful programming strategies (1995–2006) ===
The success of The Coin Vault (hosted by Robert Chambers for nearly 20 years) allowed the network to branch out into shows that featured other collectible items during the 1990s, thus setting SAH apart from its peers. Most shopping networks, like QVC and HSN, targeted a predominantly female audience, while SAH's collectible-themed shows attracted a mostly male audience. The company grew into a major retailer of men's memorabilia and collectibles.

Popular shows during the 1990s and early 2000s also included The Knife Collector's Show, co-hosted for most of its run by Shawn Leflar and former SAH personality Tom O'Dell, and the Sports Collectibles show, emceed by Don West for a majority of its run. The network also kept an eye on the most popular collectible trends of the late 1990s and early 2000s including shows devoted to Beanie Babies and Pokémon.

During this era, the network's late-night fare developed a cult following due to its hosts' outlandish behavior and loud tone of voice. As a result, the show was parodied several times on Saturday Night Live with Will Ferrell playing Don West.

By the late '90s, SAH's collectibles-based format began to decline with strong competition, which had developed from the internet and competitor EBAY which was killing the collectibles industry. The management migrated the network to a more traditional shopping channel format, and as a result, replaced many of its old hosts and brought in new personalities from Scripps' sister networks such as HGTV and Food Network to tie into those popular channels, most notably Paula Deen and Emeril Lagasse (The Coin Vault was retained, and remained successful).

Before the network's temporary suspension, it operated 24 hours a day, but ran some taped programming in addition to live broadcasts.

=== Leadership Changes and Operational Revitalization ===
In October 2001, Shop At Home (SATH) underwent significant leadership changes when Frank Woods and George Ditomassi were appointed as Co-Chief Executive Officers. This strategic move followed the dismissal of Kent Lillie, the former president and CEO, due to a series of financial losses. Under the oversight of J.D. Clinton, chairman of the board, an "office of chairman" was established, which included both Woods and Ditomassi among its members. Their mandate was to steer the company towards profitability in a rapidly expanding home shopping market.

Frank Woods, who also chaired the executive committee, brought his expertise from The Woods Group, focusing on the media industry. George Ditomassi, with his background as a former chairman of Milton Bradley Company and COO of Hasbro, assumed the roles of co-CEO, president, and chief operating officer. The executive team was further strengthened with Charles Bone, a partner at Wyatt Tarrant & Combs law firm.

This leadership overhaul aimed to capitalize on the burgeoning home shopping sector and reverse the company's fortunes.

=== Initial Sale from Summit America Television Inc. to The E. W. Scripps Company ===
On October 31, 2002, The E. W. Scripps Company completed its acquisition of a controlling interest in the Shop At Home Network from Summit America Television Inc. (formerly Shop At Home Inc.), with Scripps purchasing 70% of the network for $49.5 million in cash. This acquisition was part of a larger financial strategy, including a $47.5 million loan from Scripps to Summit America for debt repayment, secured against Summit’s television stations. Despite Summit America retaining a 30% stake in Shop At Home and its five TV stations, these stations continued to broadcast Shop At Home content. The deal was expected to impact Scripps’ earnings slightly, with reductions anticipated for the fourth quarter of 2002 and the full year of 2003. Scripps' investment in Shop At Home was aimed at expanding its presence in the growing television retailing sector, complementing its portfolio of media businesses, including Scripps Networks.

=== Second Sale from Summit America Television Inc. to The E. W. Scripps Company ===
In April 2004, The E. W. Scripps Company completed its acquisition of Summit America Television Inc., which included a 30 percent minority interest in the Shop At Home television retailing network and five Shop At Home-affiliated broadcast television stations. The acquisition, valued at approximately $184 million for around 45 million shares, resulted in Scripps owning 100 percent of the Shop At Home Network. Additionally, Scripps took control of five television stations in major U.S. markets, enhancing its reach to about 5.3 million cable households. This move was part of Scripps' broader strategy to expand its media and retailing footprint, which includes various television networks, newspapers, and web properties.

=== First closure ===
E.W. Scripps ceased its operations of Shop at Home on June 21, 2006. The company cited difficulties in competing with the larger QVC and HSN. "Going Out Of Business" proceedings began May 22, 2006, when Shop at Home started their Huge Blow-Out-Sale. During this sale, many of their regular items were sold at discounted rates, along with some items that weren't presented on Shop at Home before. Special sale conditions were that credit cards were required, and that all sales were final. The sale ended June 2, 2006; however, a Last-Chance Sale began exactly a week later on June 9, and lasted until the network's closure.

Employees at Shop at Home were to receive an additional two weeks' pay, severance pay, and, if they remained through the network's closure, three months of benefits, such as insurance.

=== Jewelry Television buys Shop at Home ===
In 2006 Jewelry Television bought Shop at Home and all of Shop at Home's assets from owner E.W. Scripps.

As the scheduled final days of Shop at Home approached, Jewelry Television announced it would purchase all assets of the network and maintain 100 unspecified jobs in Nashville under its sale agreement. Scripps detailed the sale at $17 million for fixed assets, and noted that Jewelry Television would also assume existing cable and satellite television carriage agreements.

On June 23, 2006, Shop at Home TV returned to the air with a limited schedule, once again specializing in the sale of various collectible merchandise ranging from collectible gold, silver and rare coins; popular brand name watches like Tag Heuer & Bulova; to unique knives and autographed sports memorabilia.

The original schedule was 10 p.m. to 8 a.m. Eastern time. Kim Church (named Kim Stamper until 2005), Shawn Leflar, Robert Parsons, Elliot Smith, and several other hosts returned.

On September 11, 2006, Shop at Home returned to a full 24-hour on-air schedule, returning to selling a variety of products.

=== Second closure ===
It was announced on January 8, 2008, that Shop at Home would permanently cease its broadcast on March 7, 2008, again citing its failure to successfully compete with QVC, HSN, and ShopNBC (now ShopHQ).

Before its second closure, several longtime hosts returned to the show in a "Reunion Month" throughout the month of February.

A couple of the shows have received new life on other networks. The Watch Show and Tim Temple moved to Jewelry Television.

Shop at Home went off the air on March 8, 2008. After a period of time where it continued to sell collectibles and knives, the network's domain has since become only a redirect to the Jewelry Television website.

=== Controversy on signed sports items sold ===
There have been a number of reports that several pieces of Mickey Mantle-signed sports memorabilia sold on the network were forgeries. An example of a Mickey Mantle autographed baseball that was sold by Shop At Home TV back in the 1990s was, according to a blogger, "a forgery", and the same went for many other autographed sports items sold on the network.

== Television stations ==
While Shop at Home was primarily a cable and satellite television network, the network also aired on broadcast television stations in the United States. Until Scripps' sale of the network, five of these stations were owned and operated by Shop at Home itself, but its operations remained completely separate from the existing operations of Scripps' general commercial television stations outside of financial disclosures. In September 2006, Scripps agreed to sell the stations to Multicultural Television Broadcasting LLC for $170 million pending FCC approval; they dropped Shop at Home programming soon after Multicultural took over. The five stations were:

- WSAH 43 Bridgeport, Connecticut/New York City
- WMFP 62 Lawrence/Boston, Massachusetts
- KCNS 38 San Francisco, California
- WRAY-TV 30 Wilson/Raleigh, North Carolina
- WOAC 67 Canton/Cleveland, Ohio

Other stations remained affiliated with the Shop at Home Network, and are listed below:

- WYLE Florence/Huntsville, Alabama/Decatur, Alabama
- KSVM-LP Santa Barbara, California/Santa Maria, California/San Luis Obispo, California
- WJJA Racine/Milwaukee
- WJYS Hammond, Indiana/Chicago
- KHON-DT2 Honolulu, Hawaii (late night hours only)
- KJRH-DT4

Some stations stopped broadcasting Shop at Home before the first closure:

- KZJL Houston, TX

In addition, programming was seen online on the network's website.

Following SAH's first closure, these stations began airing Jewelry Television. Some stations continued to JTV in the late morning and afternoon even after Shop at Home's return to 24-hour programming. WJJA would carry JTV until April 21, when it was purchased by Weigel Broadcasting to carry the pre-network version of MeTV and became WBME-TV.
