= WDSR =

- Lake City, Florida; United States
- Frequency: 1340 kHz
- Branding: The BIG Talker

Programming
- Format: News Talk Information
- Affiliations: Fox News Radio; Premiere Networks

Ownership
- Owner: Newman Media, Inc.
- Operator: Southern Stone Communications (via LMA)
- Sister stations: WQHL, WNFB, WCJX, WQHL-FM, WJZS

History
- First air date: 1946

Technical information
- Licensing authority: FCC
- Facility ID: 2874
- Class: C
- Power: 1,000 watts unlimited
- Transmitter coordinates: 30°09′20.00″N 82°38′14.00″W
- Translators: W240DU (95.9 MHz, Lake City)

Links
- Public license information: Public file; LMS
- Website: WDSR Online

WDSR (1340 AM) is a News Talk Information radio station licensed to Lake City, Florida, United States. The station operates under the branding The BIG Talker in simulcast with Live Oak-licensed WQHL (1250 AM). WDSR is owned by Newman Media, Inc. as part of a duopoly with classic hits station WNFB (94.3 FM). Both stations are operated by Southern Stone Communications under a local marketing agreement, making it a sister station to WQHL, Live Oak-licensed country music station WQHL-FM (98.1 FM), Live Oak-licensed sports radio station WJZS (106.1 FM), and Five Points-licensed hot adult contemporary station WCJX (106.5 FM).

== History ==
Former logo.

WDSR, along with sister station WNFB, was purchased by Paul Newman in 1998. The owner died in 2015; however, the station remains under ownership by his family via a trust.

In 2013, WDSR flipped from an oldies format to country music under the branding 99.5 The Falcon. Concurrently, WDSR's FM translator switched frequencies from 97.1 FM (W246BY) to 95.5 (W238BW) .

In 2017, operation of WDSR and WNFB moved to Southern Communications (now Southern Stone) under a local marketing agreement. Since then, WDSR flipped to a News Talk Information format in conjunction with Southern Stone-owned WQHL of nearby Live Oak.

== Programming ==
WDSR/WQHL currently feature syndicated programming from Premiere Networks, including The Clay Travis and Buck Sexton Show and The Sean Hannity Show. The station also airs news programming from Fox News Radio.

== Translator ==
WDSR operates an FM translator in the local Lake City area:

Broadcast translator for WDSR
Call sign	Frequency	City of license	FID	ERP (W)	HAAT	Class	Transmitter coordinates	FCC info	Notes
W240DU	95.9 FM	Lake City, Florida	201483	250	152 m (499 ft)	D	30°09′21″N 82°38′13″W	LMS	Formerly: W246BY (until 2013); W238BW (2013–2018)
