= KKPX-TV =

Television station in San Jose, California

- San Jose–San Francisco–; Oakland, California; United States
- City: San Jose, California
- Channels: Digital: 33 (UHF); Virtual: 65

Programming
- Affiliations: 65.1: Ion Television; for others, see § Subchannels

Ownership
- Owner: Ion Media; (Ion Television License, LLC)

History
- First air date: November 15, 1986
- Former call signs: KLXV-TV (1986–1998)
- Former channel numbers: Analog: 65 (UHF, 1986–2009); Digital: 41 (UHF, until 2020)
- Former affiliations: TBN (1986–1995); inTV (1995–1998)
- Call sign meaning: K to differentiate from other Ion stations, PX for Pax TV

Technical information
- Licensing authority: FCC
- Facility ID: 22644
- ERP: 510 kW
- HAAT: 432 m (1,417 ft)
- Transmitter coordinates: 37°41′14.4″N 122°26′5.3″W

Links
- Public license information: Public file; LMS
- Website: iontelevision.com

KKPX-TV (channel 65) is a television station licensed to San Jose, California, United States, serving as the Ion Television outlet for the San Francisco Bay Area. The station is owned by the Ion Media subsidiary of the E. W. Scripps Company, and has offices on Price Avenue in Redwood City; its transmitter is located atop San Bruno Mountain.

== History ==
The station first signed on the air on November 15, 1986, as KLXV-TV (the last three letters of the callsign representing the Roman numeral for 65) and was an affiliate of the Trinity Broadcasting Network. In 1995, the station became an affiliate of the infomercial service InTV. In January 1998, the station's call letters were changed to KKPX after Paxson Communications (now Ion Media) bought the station. KKPX became a charter owned-and-operated station of Pax TV (the predecessor of Ion Television, to which the network was renamed in 2007) on August 31.

== Newscasts ==
From 2000 to 2005, KKPX, during weeknights, aired rebroadcasts of KNTV (channel 11)'s 6 and 11 p.m. newscasts at 7 and 11:30 p.m. instead of airing newscasts from then-NBC affiliate KRON-TV (channel 4). The newscasts were originally branded as NewsChannel 11 on Pax after KNTV switched its affiliation from ABC to The WB. When KNTV joined NBC in January 2002, the newscasts were first renamed to NBC 3 News on Pax, then to NBC 11 News on Pax several months later, after KNTV stopped branding by its common channel number on Bay Area cable systems. Like most other such arrangements involving Pax stations and major network affiliates, the simulcasts were dropped on June 30, 2005 (the day prior to Pax's rebranding as i: Independent Television).

== Technical information ==
=== Subchannels ===
The station's signal is multiplexed:

Subchannels of KKPX-TV
Subchannel	Res.	Short name	Programming
65.1	720p	ION	Ion Television
65.2	480i	Bounce	Bounce TV
65.3	480i	CourtTV	Court TV
65.4	480i	IONPlus	Ion Plus
65.5	480i	Laff	Laff
65.6	480i	BUSTED	Busted
65.7	480i	GameSho	Game Show Central
65.8	480i	QVC	QVC

KKPX-TV had plans for a Mobile DTV feed of subchannel 65.1. A Mobile DTV feed did later launch, but it carried programming from 65.2 (Qubo).

=== Analog-to-digital conversion ===
KKPX-TV shut down its analog signal, over UHF channel 65, on June 12, 2009, as part of the federally mandated transition from analog to digital television. The station's digital signal remained on its pre-transition UHF channel 41, using virtual channel 65.
