= WJAQ =

- Marianna, Florida; United States
- Frequency: 100.9 MHz
- Branding: Today's Best Country

Programming
- Format: Country
- Affiliations: Westwood One; Seminole Sports Network

Ownership
- Owner: MFR, Inc.

History
- First air date: 1964

Technical information
- Licensing authority: FCC
- Facility ID: 6748
- Class: A
- ERP: 5,900 watts (horizontal)
- HAAT: 101 meters (horizontal)
- Transmitter coordinates: 30°47′1.00″N 85°15′18.00″W

Links
- Public license information: Public file; LMS
- Website: wjaqfm.com

WJAQ (100.9 FM) is a radio station licensed to serve Marianna, Florida, United States. The station is owned by MFR, Inc.

It broadcasts a country music format previously featuring the "Today's Best Country" satellite-delivered format from Westwood One. Now currently playing from a licensed catalog of Today's Best Country music.

Shows include "The Auction Block" produced in studio as well as Business News and after show Podcast covering the local news of the business community and events of Jackson County Florida.
