= WTLY =

Radio station in Tallahassee, Florida

- Tallahassee, Florida; United States
- Broadcast area: Tallahassee, Florida
- Frequency: 1270 kHz
- Branding: 96.5 The Spear

Programming
- Format: Sports
- Affiliations: Fox Sports Radio; Florida State Seminoles

Ownership
- Owner: iHeartMedia, Inc.; (iHM Licenses, LLC)
- Sister stations: WFLA-FM; WGMY; WTNT-FM; WXSR

History
- First air date: 1935 (as WTAL)
- Former call signs: WTAL (1935–1962); WTNT (1962–1988); WYYN (1988–1990); WNLS (1990–2015)
- Call sign meaning: "Tally" (nickname for Tallahassee)

Technical information
- Licensing authority: FCC
- Facility ID: 51592
- Class: D
- Power: 5,000 watts day; 110 watts night
- Transmitter coordinates: 30°25′44.7″N 84°19′42.6″W
- Translator: 96.5 W243EG (Tallahassee)

Links
- Public license information: Public file; LMS
- Webcast: Listen live (via iHeartRadio)
- Website: 965thespear.iheart.com

WTLY (1270 AM) is a radio station in Tallahassee, Florida, licensed to and serving the Tallahassee area. The station is currently owned by iHeartMedia, Inc. Its studios are in the north side of Tallahassee, while the transmitter is located west of downtown.

== History ==
The station was first licensed on December 1, 1935, as WTAL. It became WTNT on December 1, 1962, after an exchange with WTNT (1450 AM).

As sports radio station WNLS, for over a decade, the station's cornerstone program was The Jeff Cameron Show. On January 25, 2012, Cameron resigned his post and was later announced to have taken a job at WTSM, a competing sports station in Tallahassee.

On November 26, 2014, WNLS dropped its sports format and began stunting with Christmas music, branded as "Christmas 94.3". At midnight on December 26, WNLS flipped to adult contemporary as "94.3 My FM".

On September 24, 2015, WNLS rebranded as "94.5 My FM", as FM translator W232BO had moved from 94.3 FM to 94.5 FM. On September 30, WNLS changed their call letters to WTLY. On November 6, 2015, at 5 p.m., WTLY rebranded as "105.3 My FM", as the translator changed frequency from 94.5 FM to 105.3 FM, and began stunting with Christmas music.

On May 27, 2017, WTLY flipped to urban contemporary as "105.3 The Beat", launching with 5,000 songs commercial free.

In June 2019, WTLY changed their format from urban contemporary (which moved to WGMY-HD2) to beach music, branded as "Beach 96.5" (simulcast on translator W243EG (96.5 FM)), utilizing iHeartMedia's Real Fun Beach Radio network. However, this turned out to be a stunt; on July 8, at 2 p.m., WTLY flipped to classic hip hop, branded as "Throwback 96.5".

On August 12, 2022 at midnight, after playing "Got Your Money" by Ol' Dirty Bastard featuring Kelis and going into a stopset, the station dropped the classic hip hop format and began stunting with Christmas music, teasing a new format to debut on August 15 and emphasizing it would remain the Tallahassee home of Florida State Seminoles athletics. On August 15, 2022, WTLY returned to sports as "96.5 The Spear".

== Translators ==
WTLY programming is also carried on a broadcast translator to improve the coverage area of the main station in northeast portions of Tallahassee.

Broadcast translator for WTLY
Call sign	Frequency	City of license	FID	ERP (W)	Class	FCC info
W243EG	96.5 FM	Tallahassee, Florida	200511	99	D	LMS
