= WRLM (TV) =

Television station in Canton, Ohio

- Canton–Cleveland, Ohio; United States
- City: Canton, Ohio
- Channels: Digital: 24 (UHF), shared with WEAO; Virtual: 47

Programming
- Affiliations: 47.1: TCT

Ownership
- Owner: Total Christian Television; (Radiant Life Ministries, Inc.)

History
- First air date: March 1, 1982
- Former call signs: WOAC (1982–2009)
- Former channel numbers: Analog: 67 (UHF, 1982–2009); Digital: 47 (UHF, 2003–2018), 50 (UHF, 2018–2019); Virtual: 67 (2003–2009)
- Former affiliations: Independent (1982–1995, 2007–2009); inTV (1995–1997); Shop at Home (1997–2007)
- Call sign meaning: Radiant Life Ministries

Technical information
- Licensing authority: FCC
- Facility ID: 43870
- ERP: 191 kW
- HAAT: 294.6 m (967 ft)
- Transmitter coordinates: 41°4′58.5″N 81°38′1.6″W

Links
- Public license information: Public file; LMS
- Website: www.tct.tv

WRLM (channel 47) is a religious television station licensed to Canton, Ohio, United States, serving the Cleveland–Akron television market. The station is owned by Total Christian Television (TCT). Through a channel sharing agreement with PBS member station WEAO (channel 49), the two stations transmit using WEAO's spectrum from an antenna in Copley, Ohio.

== History ==
The station first signed on the air on March 1, 1982, as WOAC, broadcasting on UHF channel 67; it was founded by businessman Morton Kent. Initially, it operated as an independent station, serving mainly the Canton area. It originally maintained a programming format featuring syndicated reruns, movies, and local news updates. In 1995, Canton 67 Ltd. sold WOAC to Whitehead Media, which entered into a local marketing agreement with Paxson Communications (now Ion Media Networks). Paxson dropped WOAC's entertainment programming in late 1995, and the station adopted an infomercial format provided by Paxson's Infomall TV Network (or inTV) service (a predecessor to today's Ion Television). Shortly afterwards, Paxson purchased WAKC-TV (channel 23, now WVPX-TV) from ValueVision, and as a result, both stations broadcast inTV programming from December 31, 1996, when WAKC's affiliation contract with ABC expired, until 1998, when WOAC was sold to the Shop at Home Network, which replaced inTV with its own home shopping programming.

It is thought that Paxson sold WOAC because WAKC-TV had a stronger signal that better covered all of Northeast Ohio; WOAC's signal at the time was essentially limited to Canton and Stark County. However, WOAC's antenna was subsequently moved to the Brimfield site, and the power was boosted to five million watts—the maximum allowed for analog UHF broadcasting. This allowed the station to have a much stronger signal that rivaled that of other local stations. In early 2006, WOAC began operating its digital signal on UHF channel 47, with a power of one million watts—the highest transmitting power allowable for a digital television signal, and provides an equivalent coverage area to the analog signal.

On May 16, 2006, the E. W. Scripps Company (incidentally, the longtime owner of Cleveland's ABC affiliate WEWS-TV, channel 5) announced that Shop at Home would be suspending operations, effective June 22, 2006. However, Jewelry Television took over the Shop at Home network operations around the time of the planned closure, and WOAC and other Shop at Home affiliates then ran a combination of programming from the two networks.

On September 26, 2006, Scripps announced that it was selling its Shop at Home stations, including WOAC, to Multicultural Television of New York City for $170 million. The sale of WOAC and sister stations KCNS in San Francisco and WRAY-TV in Raleigh, North Carolina, was completed on December 20, 2006. Shortly after Multicultural closed on the deal, all home shopping programming ceased in favor of running infomercials and locally produced programming (such as Dining With Steve, which profiled restaurants in the station's area of service, and The Art of Living, which interviewed influential people in the same area).

After Multicultural ran into financial problems and defaulted on its loans, the station was placed into a trust; it was then sold to Marion, Illinois–based Tri-State Christian Television, a chain of Christian television stations. On June 25, 2009, the station's call letters were changed to WRLM, and the station began broadcasting TCT's religious programming. The station's call letters are named after Radiant Life Ministries (the licensee name under which TCT owns WRLM); however, they are not related to KRLB-LD in Richland, Washington, whose group of stations are operated by a similarly named "Radiant Light Broadcasting".

WRLM maintained studios on Front Street in Cuyahoga Falls until TCT closed all of its local studios in June 2018 with the Federal Communications Commission (FCC)'s repeal of the Main Studio Rule.

== Technical information ==
Subchannels of WEAO and WRLM
License	Subchannel	Res.	Short name	Programming
WEAO	49.1	720p	WEAO HD	PBS
WEAO	49.2	480i	WEAO FS	Fusion
WEAO	49.3	480i	WEAO FN	FNX
WRLM	47.1	720p	WRLM	TCT

=== Analog-to-digital conversion ===
WRLM (as WOAC) shut down its analog signal, over UHF channel 67, on February 17, 2009, the original date on which full-power television stations in the United States transitioned from analog to digital broadcasts under federal mandate. The station's digital signal remained on its pre-transition UHF channel 47, using virtual channel 67. The virtual channel was later remapped to the station's physical digital channel, 47.1, on June 25, 2009 (one of the few television stations to remap its virtual channel to one differing from its former analog allocation prior to the digital conversion).
