= WQHL-FM =

Radio station in Live Oak–Lake City, Florida

- Live Oak, Florida; United States
- Broadcast area: Lake City - Live Oak
- Frequency: 98.1 MHz
- Branding: The Big 98

Programming
- Format: Country

Ownership
- Owner: Southern Stone Communications; (Southern Communications, LLC)
- Sister stations: WQHL, WJZS, WCJX, WDSR, WNFB

History
- First air date: December 1973

Technical information
- Licensing authority: FCC
- Facility ID: 15871
- Class: C2
- ERP: 50,000 watts
- HAAT: 135.2 meters (444 ft)
- Transmitter coordinates: 30°17′14.00″N 82°57′56.00″W

Links
- Public license information: Public file; LMS
- Website: wqhl981.com

WQHL-FM (98.1 FM) is a commercial radio station licensed to Live Oak, Florida, United States, and serving Lake City. Owned by Southern Stone Communications, it airs a country music format. The studios and transmitter facilities are on Helvenston Street Southeast in Live Oak.

== History ==
Former logo

WQHL-FM signed on the air in December 1973. The station was later acquired by Norm Protsman, owner of WNER (1250 AM, now WQHL. In 1988, Protsman sold the two stations to Day Communications.

In 1999, the owner died, with the Day family selling the stations to the Southern Media Group. By 2001, WQHL-AM-FM were owned by Black Crow Media Group. The stations were sold to current owner Southern Stone Communications in 2013.

== Programming ==
Weekday programming on the station includes the nationally syndicated "Big D and Bubba" show in morning drive time. Middays are hosted by Sherri Farmer and afternoons feature Wayne Littrell.
