= WFLA-FM =

- Midway, Florida; United States
- Broadcast area: Tallahassee metropolitan area
- Frequency: 100.7 MHz
- Branding: 100.7 WFLA

Programming
- Format: News/talk
- Network: Fox News Radio
- Affiliations: Compass Media Networks; Premiere Networks; Westwood One

Ownership
- Owner: iHeartMedia, Inc.; (iHM Licenses, LLC)
- Sister stations: WGMY; WTLY; WTNT-FM; WXSR

History
- First air date: 1996
- Former call signs: WTPS (1991–1996); WJZT (1996–1999); WOKL (1999–2002); WBWT (2002–2006)
- Call sign meaning: Florida (shared with Tampa Bay sister station WFLA)

Technical information
- Licensing authority: FCC
- Facility ID: 5379
- Class: C3
- ERP: 11,500 watts
- HAAT: 149 meters (489 ft)
- Transmitter coordinates: 30°29′32.7″N 84°17′12.6″W

Links
- Public license information: Public file; LMS
- Webcast: Listen live (via iHeartRadio)
- Website: wflafm.iheart.com

WFLA-FM (100.7 MHz) is a commercial radio station licensed to Midway, Florida, and serving the Tallahassee metropolitan area. It broadcasts a news/talk format and is owned by iHeartMedia, Inc. The studios and offices are on John Knox Road in Tallahassee.

WFLA-FM has an effective radiated power (ERP) of 11,500 watts. The transmitter is on William Reeves Road near Interstate 10 in Tallahassee.

== Programming ==
Weekdays on WFLA-FM begin with a local news and interview show hosted by Preston Scott. The rest of the weekday schedule is nationally syndicated talk shows, mostly from co-owned Premiere Networks: The Glenn Beck Radio Program, The Clay Travis and Buck Sexton Show, The Sean Hannity Show, The Mark Levin Show, The Ramsey Show with Dave Ramsey, Ground Zero with Clyde Lewis, Coast to Coast AM with George Noory and This Morning, America's First News with Gordon Deal.

Weekends feature specialty shows on money, health, gardening and the outdoors, some of which are paid brokered programming. Syndicated weekend shows include Bill Handel on the Law, At Home with Gary Sullivan, Rich DeMuro on Tech, Armstrong & Getty, Sunday Night Live with Bill Cunningham and Somewhere in Time with Art Bell. Most hours begin with an update from Fox News Radio.

== History ==
The construction permit for a new Tallahassee-area FM outlet was obtained from the Federal Communications Commission (FCC) in 1991. The unbuilt station was given the working call sign WTPS. When the station signed on in 1996, it took the call letters WJZT, to reflect its smooth jazz format and its Tallahassee location. The unbuilt station had been owned by Paxson Communications, headed by broadcasting executive and owner Bud Paxson. But it was sold to Clear Channel Communications in 1996, before it went on the air. Clear Channel was a forerunner to today's iHeartMedia.

After a year of smooth jazz, WJZT switched to a format of 1980s and 1990s hits. The station went through several formats and call sign changes over the next several years. It had an urban contemporary sound as WBWT until July 10, 2006. At that point, management decided to flip the format to talk radio, using the call letters of its sister station in Tampa Bay, WFLA, but adding the -FM suffix. WFLA-FM shares most of the nationally syndicated shows heard on WFLA, but it has its own morning drive time program.
