= WTNT-FM =

- Tallahassee, Florida; United States
- Frequency: 94.9 MHz
- Branding: 94.9 TNT

Programming
- Format: Country
- Affiliations: Premiere Networks

Ownership
- Owner: iHeartMedia, Inc.; (iHM Licenses, LLC)
- Sister stations: WTLY; WXSR; WGMY; WFLA-FM

History
- Former call signs: WOMA (1967–1977); WLVW (1977–1982); WCSN (1982–1983)
- Call sign meaning: TNT

Technical information
- Licensing authority: FCC
- Facility ID: 51590
- Class: C1
- ERP: 100,000 watts
- HAAT: 256 meters (840 ft)
- Transmitter coordinates: 30°34′42.7″N 84°15′47.6″W

Links
- Public license information: Public file; LMS
- Webcast: Listen live (via iHeartRadio)
- Website: 949tnt.iheart.com

WTNT-FM (94.9 MHz) is a country radio station broadcasting in Tallahassee, Florida, United States. WTNT-FM is owned by iHeartMedia; its studios and transmitter are located separately on Tallahassee's north side.

== History ==
=== Early years ===
The Federal Communications Commission (FCC) granted a construction permit to the Tallahassee Appliance Corporation on May 4, 1966, for a new FM radio station to broadcast to Tallahassee, Florida, on 94.9 MHz. The WTNT-FM call letters were initially assigned at that time, but they were changed to WOMA before sign-on on July 24, 1967. WOMA promoted itself as "FM Goes Country"—an unusual format for the time, given that most FM stations of the day tended to specialize in beautiful music formats. The country format was retained all the way through 1976, when, under new owner Walter-Weeks Broadcasting, WOMA and WTNT (1270 AM), the two frequencies exchanged formats, with adult contemporary music moving to the FM and country to AM.

In 1977, WOMA switched to beautiful music and adopted the call sign WLVW. The next year, WTNT and WLVW were sold to Robert E. Ingstad, Jr., whose radio holdings until that time were entirely concentrated in the Upper Midwest. While Ingstad contemplated flipping WLVW to a rock format, he ultimately retained beautiful music after the competitor in this format, WBGM, also announced its intention to switch, which upset local listeners.

=== Palmer Communications ownership ===
This remained the case until Palmer Communications of Des Moines, Iowa, purchased the two stations from Ingstad in 1982. The new owners followed up on efforts started by Ingstad to increase power and upgrade the facilities, and Palmer made a major programming move for the pair by securing the rights to broadcast Florida State Seminoles football and men's basketball games. The beautiful music format was next to go by the wayside; after testing adult contemporary and country music, Palmer selected country and renamed the station WCSN, complete with a "country cousins" promotional program. The new format turned out to be a miscalculation. WMNX (96.1 FM) started with its own country music format 90 days before WCSN's flip, and it performed well in the ratings, taking third overall in the market; meanwhile, ratings for the revamped 94.9 dropped by more than half from the last book as WLVW. When WMNX was sold and fired its general manager, Palmer hired him.

In conjunction with a relocation of the transmitter from the Hotel Duval, where it was impeded by low height, to a new 850 feet (260 m) mast, WCSN changed call letters to WTNT-FM in December 1983 and revamped its format. The move was a rousing ratings success: listenership figures more than doubled from 1983 to 1984, and the new WTNT-FM attracted double-digit ratings every year from 1987 to 1994, helping to lift it to the position of highest-billing station in the market from 1989 to 1996.

=== Five sales in seven years ===
In 1990, Palmer reached a deal with Arso Radio Corporation, whose broadcast holdings were mostly in Puerto Rico, to sell its Tallahassee radio stations for $2.8 million. Under Arso, the AM station (which had been turned into a simulcast of WTNT-FM) shifted to a classic country sound as WNLS. Arso sold the properties two years later to Park Communications of Ithaca, New York, for $2.9 million.

Park sold WNLS and WTNT in February 1996 to R. Sanders Hickey, who paid $3.5 million; his Southern Broadcasting Company merged three other stations with the two to form a five-station cluster and then sold its stations in Panama City, Pensacola and Tallahassee to Paxson Communications Corporation in a deal announced that May. The next year, Paxson sold its entire radio portfolio of 46 stations to Clear Channel Communications, forerunner of iHeartMedia, for $693 million.

Florida State football broadcasts returned to WTNT-FM in 2020 under a new six-year deal between iHeart, the university, and Learfield IMG College.
