= WNFB =

- Lake City, Florida; United States
- Frequency: 94.3 MHz
- Branding: 94.3 The Lake

Programming
- Format: Classic hits

Ownership
- Owner: Newman Media, Inc.
- Operator: Southern Stone Communications
- Sister stations: WDSR, WCJX, WQHL-FM

History
- First air date: May 28, 1969
- Former call signs: WTLD-FM (1969–1979); WNFQ (1979–1983); WQPD (1983–1989)

Technical information
- Licensing authority: FCC
- Facility ID: 2877
- Class: C2
- ERP: 50,000 watts
- HAAT: 150 meters (490 ft)
- Transmitter coordinates: 30°07′44.00″N 82°52′49.00″W

Links
- Public license information: Public file; LMS

WNFB (94.3 FM, "94.3 The Lake") is a commercial radio station licensed to Lake City, Florida, United States, airing a classic hits format. It is owned by Newman Media, Inc. along with talk station WDSR. Both stations are operated by Southern Stone Communications under a local marketing agreement (LMA).

The transmitter is along County Road 49 at 148th Avenue in McAlpin.

== History ==
The station signed on the air on May 28, 1969. The original call sign was WTLD-FM. It became WNFQ in 1979. In 1983, the call letters became WQPD. And in 1989 the call letters switched to WNFB.

WNFB and sister station WDSR were acquired by John Newman in 1998. He died in 2015; however, the station remains under ownership of the family via a trust.

On December 26, 2022, WNFB swapped formats with WCJX (106.5 FM). WNFB's previous hot adult contemporary format as Mix 94.3 moved to WCJX. At the same time, WNFB inherited 106.5's classic hits format along with The Lake branding.

Kerry Alan Hegler died at age 70 in October 2, 2026.

== Programming ==
Syndicated programming heard on WNFB includes The Bob and Sheri Show in morning drive time.
