= Archer Lodge, North Carolina =

Town in North Carolina

- Town
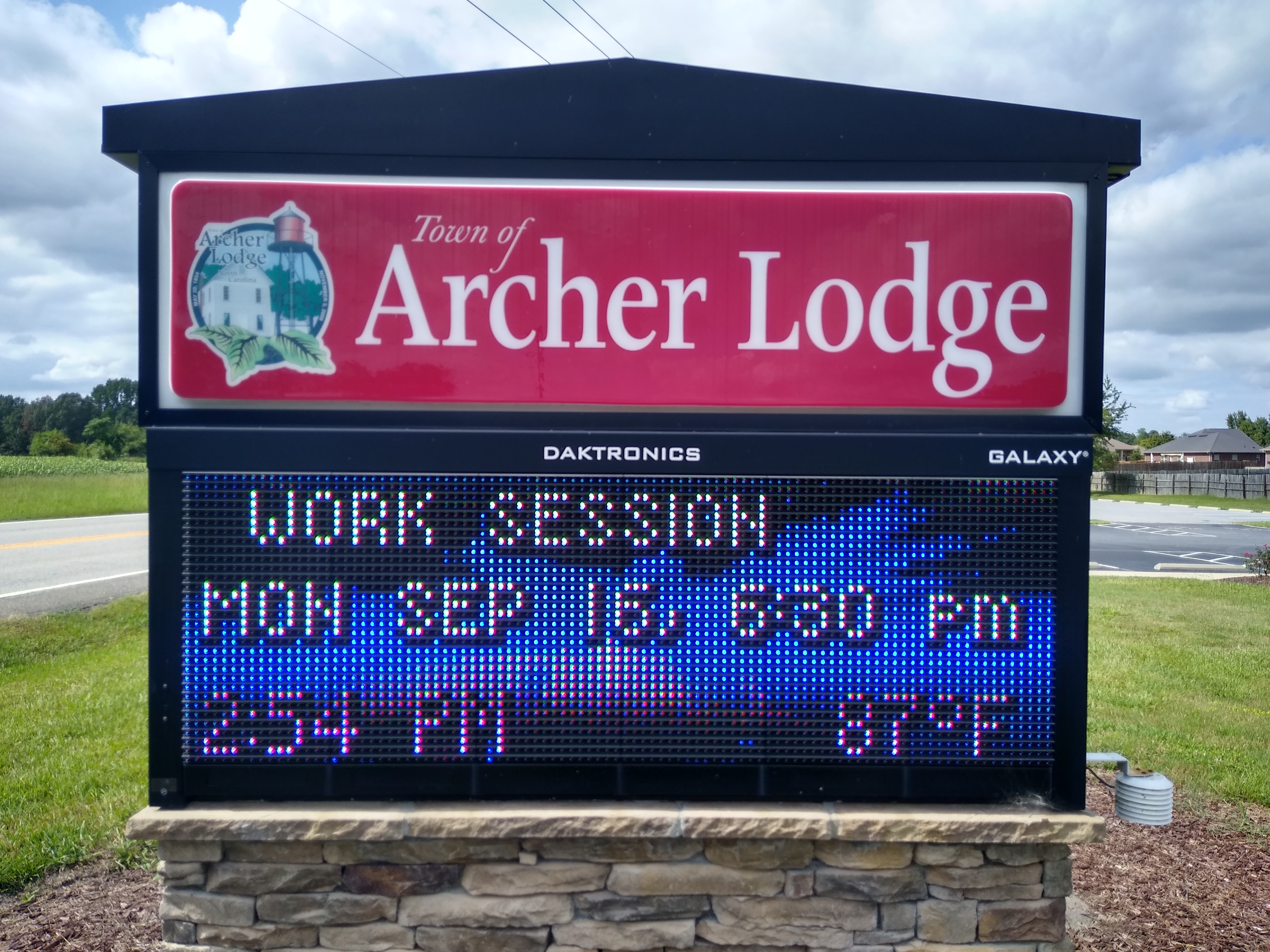
- Motto: "The Best Corner of the World"
- Location within North Carolina Location within the United States
- Coordinates: 35°41′26″N 78°22′30″W
- Country: United States
- State: North Carolina
- County: Johnston
- Incorporated: 2009

Area
  - Total: 9.08 sq mi (23.53 km^{2})
  - Land: 9.07 sq mi (23.48 km^{2})
  - Water: 0.015 sq mi (0.04 km^{2})
- Elevation: 315 ft (96 m)

Population (2020)
  - Total: 4,797
  - Density: 529.1/sq mi (204.27/km^{2})
- Time zone: UTC-5 (Eastern (EST))
  - Summer (DST): UTC-4 (EDT)
- ZIP codes: 27591, 27527
- Area code: 919
- FIPS code: 37-01760
- GNIS feature ID: 2612171
- Website: www.archerlodgenc.gov

Archer Lodge is a town in Johnston County, North Carolina, United States. The population was 4,797 at the 2020 census.

== History ==
A Masonic lodge named Archer No. 157 was established by the Grand Lodge of Ancient, Free, and Accepted Masons of North Carolina on December 6, 1854, at what was then known as Creachville. In 1865, the lodge building was razed and the charter destroyed by Gen. William T. Sherman's Union Army on their way to Raleigh. The lodge received a new charter after the war, but a clerical error resulted in a misnumeration, and it was designated Archer Lodge No. 165.

The community has had several post offices over the years. The first was called "Creachville", which existed from 1851 to 1866. This was followed by Archer Lodge (1877–1896). It was known as "Archer" from 1896 to 1912, when it closed. After 1912, the area was covered by either the Clayton or Wendell post offices.

The people of Archer Lodge voted on November 3, 2009, to incorporate Archer Lodge as a town. The vote was certified one week later.

The Archer Lodge community is one of the fastest growing areas of Johnston County. A new middle school, Archer Lodge Middle School, opened in 2007, and the new high school, Corinth Holders High School, opened its doors in 2010 northeast of the town limits.

== Geography ==
Archer Lodge is in northern Johnston County, centered on the intersection of Buffalo Road and Covered Bridge Road, about 7 miles (11 km) south of Wendell and the same distance northeast of Clayton. According to the U.S. Census Bureau, the town has a total area of 9.3 square miles (24.1 km^{2}), of which 0.03 square miles (0.07 km^{2}), or 0.29%, are water. The town is within the Neuse River watershed.

== Demographics ==
Historical population
| Census | Pop. | Note | %± |
|---|---|---|---|
| 1970 | 711 | | — |
| 1980 | 872 | | 22.6% |
| 1990 | 795 | | −8.8% |
| 2000 | 795 | | 0.0% |
| 2010 | 4,292 | | 439.9% |
| 2020 | 4,797 | | 11.8% |
| 2025 (est.) | 5,649 | ▲ | 17.8% |
U.S. Decennial Census

=== 2020 census ===
As of the 2020 census, Archer Lodge had a population of 4,797. The median age was 38.0 years. 27.0% of residents were under the age of 18 and 10.3% of residents were 65 years of age or older. For every 100 females there were 100.1 males, and for every 100 females age 18 and over there were 101.1 males age 18 and over.

36.1% of residents lived in urban areas, while 63.9% lived in rural areas.

There were 1,646 households in Archer Lodge, of which 42.2% had children under the age of 18 living in them. Of all households, 65.1% were married-couple households, 13.7% were households with a male householder and no spouse or partner present, and 15.1% were households with a female householder and no spouse or partner present. About 13.4% of all households were made up of individuals and 5.4% had someone living alone who was 65 years of age or older. There were 1,393 families residing in the town.

There were 1,707 housing units, of which 3.6% were vacant. The homeowner vacancy rate was 1.2% and the rental vacancy rate was 8.4%.

Archer Lodge racial composition
| Race | Number | Percentage |
|---|---|---|
| White (non-Hispanic) | 3,363 | 70.11% |
| Black or African American (non-Hispanic) | 357 | 7.44% |
| Native American | 22 | 0.46% |
| Asian | 27 | 0.56% |
| Pacific Islander | 4 | 0.08% |
| Other/Mixed | 266 | 5.55% |
| Hispanic or Latino | 758 | 15.8% |

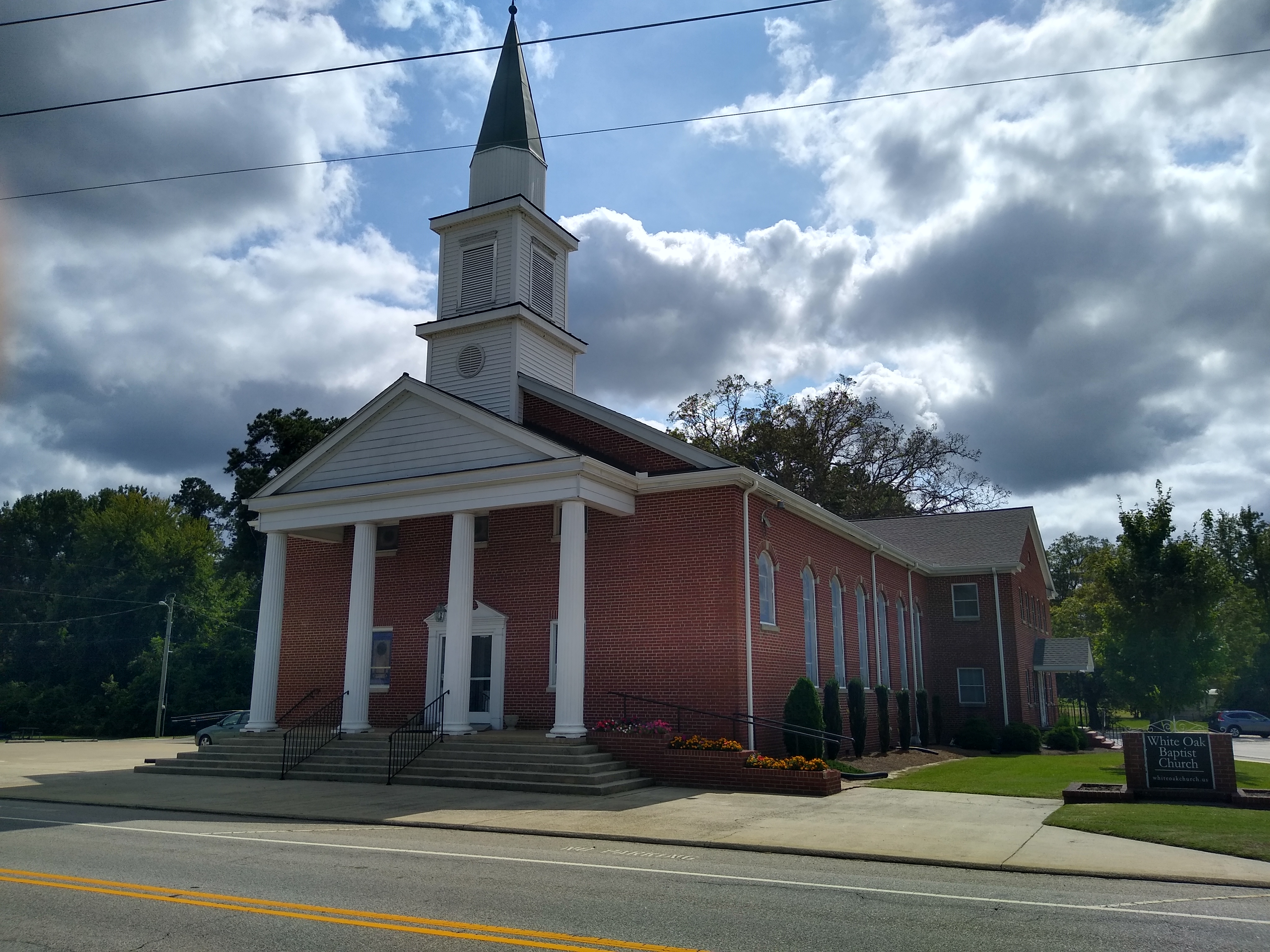
White Oak Baptist Church

== Arts and culture ==
The most significant landmark in the community is C.E. Barnes Store, which has been in operation for 96 years. The C.E. Barnes Store was renamed the Archer Lodge Express in 2023. The old Masonic Lodge used to be located right next door. The building that used to be the boarding house for the teachers at Archer Lodge School still stands next to the ball park and is being used as a private residence. White Oak Baptist Church stands at the heart of the community. The church used to be known as the Archer Lodge Missionary Baptist Church, but changed its name when it moved to its current location under a stand of white oak trees.
