= WPPX-TV =

Television station in Wilmington, Delaware

- Wilmington, Delaware; Philadelphia, Pennsylvania; United States
- City: Wilmington, Delaware
- Channels: Digital: 34 (UHF); Virtual: 61

Programming
- Affiliations: 61.1: Ion Television; for others, see § Technical information and subchannels

Ownership
- Owner: Ion Media; (Ion Television License, LLC)

History
- First air date: July 9, 1986
- Former call signs: WTGI-TV (1986–1998); WPPX (1998–2009)
- Former channel numbers: Analog: 61 (UHF, 1986–2009); Digital: 31 (UHF, 2003–2019)
- Former affiliations: Independent (1986); ShoppingLine (1986–1987); Consumers Discount Network (1987); America's Value Network (1988); Telemundo (1988–1995); inTV (1995–1998)
- Call sign meaning: Philadelphia Pax

Technical information
- Licensing authority: FCC
- Facility ID: 51984
- ERP: 310 kW
- HAAT: 324.13 m (1,063 ft)
- Transmitter coordinates: 40°2′39″N 75°14′25″W

Links
- Public license information: Public file; LMS
- Website: iontelevision.com

WPPX-TV (channel 61) is a television station licensed to Wilmington, Delaware, United States, broadcasting the Ion Television network to the Philadelphia area. Owned by the Ion Media subsidiary of the E. W. Scripps Company, it broadcasts from a transmitter in Philadelphia's Roxborough neighborhood.

Channel 61 in Wilmington signed on the air in 1986 as WTGI-TV, the first commercial television station in Delaware since 1958. It intended to operate as a general-market independent station but found itself underfunded, as a result of nonexistent carriage on local cable systems, and was forced to switch to home shopping programming to generate revenue. From 1988 to 1995, the station operated as a multilingual ethnic broadcaster with Spanish-language programs from Telemundo as well as shows in Italian, Korean, and other languages. This ended when Paxson Communications Corporation, forerunner to Ion Media, acquired WTGI-TV and incorporated it into its Infomall TV network, broadcasting infomercials and religious programming; these stations formed the core of Pax TV, predecessor to Ion, in 1998.

== History ==
=== Construction and launch ===
Though channel 61 had been allocated to Wilmington since 1966, the channel attracted little interest for primarily economic reasons. As Wilmington is part of the Philadelphia television market, any station on the channel would have to compete with Philadelphia stations for viewers and program rights. Rollins, Inc., withdrew its application in 1971 and opted to enter the cable television business instead. However, as the 1970s ended, interest began to surge in the channel, and at least one group was conducting necessary pre-application studies of community needs in February 1979. By September 1980, there were three applications on file for channel 61. Sixty-One Corporation proposed a subscription television outlet, HHL Broadcasting a commercial independent, and Delaware Valley Broadcasters initially pitched a station with Christian and family-oriented programming. The field had ballooned to seven by January 1982, when the Federal Communications Commission (FCC) designated the various applications for comparative hearing.

Delaware Valley Broadcasters was awarded the construction permit and initially selected the call sign WDVI. The group remained low-profile until July 1985, when it announced an October start date and some details of its proposed programming as a commercial independent. By September, the proposed call sign had changed to WBOT-TV (the "best of television") to avoid confusion with WPVI-TV in Philadelphia, and construction on the downtown Wilmington studios and the transmitter site in South Harrison Township, New Jersey, had started. A keystone of the station's new programming was to be a series of 75 Philadelphia Big 5 basketball games. However, the second selection of a call sign drew the ire of WBOC-TV in Salisbury, Maryland; the two signals would overlap around Dover. WBOC-TV alleged confusion would result from the launch of WBOT-TV and that it had received telephone calls intended to reach the Wilmington outlet. WBOC-TV won a lawsuit against Delaware Valley Broadcasters in Delaware Chancery Court, resulting in a call sign change to WTGI-TV.

No matter its name, channel 61 was confronted with months of construction delays. The basketball season came and went, and so too did several promised start dates, including the end of 1985 and April 1986. However, WTGI-TV finally debuted on July 9, 1986, giving Delaware its first commercial television station since WVUE folded in 1958. The station's programming mostly consisted of syndicated programming such as Dynasty, as well as local news inserts into Independent Network News and Focus Delaware, a public affairs program.

Also present at WTGI-TV's much-delayed launch were the ingredients for its near-immediate failure. Principal among these was that must-carry laws that once required local cable systems to carry local TV stations such as WTGI-TV had been overturned in 1985. Rollins Cablevision, the incumbent cable system in Wilmington, did not carry the station at launch and had no plans to do so; when WTGI-TV asked the city for assistance, it was deep into a two-year-long contract negotiation with Rollins. This limited the station's viewer and advertiser base. In addition, the station's attempt to stand out as an independent in the Philadelphia market was dashed by the relaunch of WGBS-TV the year before. Further, the delayed launch exhausted much of the investors' working capital; it had cost $6 million to put WTGI-TV on the air. By late October, the station was courting investors.

=== Home shopping and ethnic programming ===
On November 24, 1986, less than five months after going on the air, WTGI-TV dropped most of its existing programming inventory to air ShoppingLine, a home shopping service. The change in format left only a handful of programs from the original slate, including Focus Delaware and a block of religious programs on Sunday mornings. ShoppingLine went out of business in February 1987, forcing WTGI-TV to change to a new service, Consumer Discount Network. That same month, Delaware Valley Broadcasters, Limited Partnership, filed for Chapter 11 bankruptcy reorganization. Later that year, the station got something of a break when revisions to must-carry laws and a rebuild of the Wilmington cable system, sold to Heritage Cablevision, forced the company to add WTGI-TV to its lineup. Consumers Discount Network, like ShoppingLine before it, went out of business at the end of 1987, and it was replaced by America's Value Network; the station also began to reduce the amount of home shopping programming on its schedule.

The station's programming took another major turn beginning in February 1988. On February 29, it affiliated with Telemundo and began to recast itself as a multilingual station serving the Delaware Valley's ethnic communities, branding as "Philadelphia's International Channel". The new format, inspired by KSCI in the Los Angeles area, also gave the station an opportunity to appear on more cable systems, as its programming would not duplicate home shopping channels that already paid cable companies for carriage. In addition to Spanish-language output from Telemundo, the reformatted WTGI-TV offered viewers programming in Italian, Korean, Czech, Portuguese, Greek, and Ukrainian, as well as specialty programming for the Jewish and Black communities. In January 1989, WTGI removed the remaining home shopping programming from its schedule, and later that year, it moved its offices to Philadelphia. The station turned its first-ever profit in the fourth quarter of 1990.

The bankruptcy court accepted an offer by National Minority TV, Inc. (NMTV) for WTGI-TV in March 1991. However, the attempted purchase became mired in issues as to the control and ownership of the company, which claimed to be owned by minorities. Of the three members of National Minority TV, two were minorities—and one was Paul Crouch, founder of the Trinity Broadcasting Network (TBN). In TBN's monthly Praise the Lord newsletter, Crouch announced that the station would be affiliated with TBN. The deal drew criticism from WTGI's employees, believing the loss of the station's existing programming would have a negative impact on the region. However, more significantly, questions about National Minority TV's ownership structure led to the FCC taking an interest in the case. A petition to deny was filed by one of the station's employees, and the commission responded by asking NMTV for more information about its principals; if the firm were not actually minority-owned, the purchase would be illegal for TBN to execute because it owned the then-maximum of 12 commercial TV stations, a limit that could only be surpassed by minority-controlled firms. However, before the commission could act, NMTV withdrew its bid because the delays had made it impossible to meet deadlines imposed by the bankruptcy court.

The passage of the Cable Television Consumer Protection and Competition Act of 1992 put must-carry rules back into place, with important impacts on WTGI. In late 1992, of the 1.8 million cable homes in the Philadelphia market, only 520,000 received the station, and attempts to increase that number were being met by "various degrees of coldness". A year later, the station was promoting its addition to many cable systems as a result of the new law, and it had begun production of a new local program, the health talk show Dr. Castillo y su Salud, to provide health advice to the Hispanic community. Despite increased profitability, Delaware Valley Broadcasters filed for Chapter 11 bankruptcy protection a second time in August 1993, per general manager Dan Slape, "to better meet our future goals and objectives". As a result, the bankruptcy court ordered a sale of the station. Even with a court-ordered sale looming, WTGI initiated production of a new public affairs series, Entérate (Find Out), in July.

=== Pax/Ion ownership ===
In November 1994, Paxson Communications Corporation moved to acquire WTGI-TV for $10.2 million, the station having been in bankruptcy for more than seven years. WTGI general manager Dan Slape noted that the new ownership was looking toward an infomercial-heavy format for the station. Paxson announced the launch of Infomall TV in January 1995 as well as a national push to purchase television stations to carry the service. The switch in programming took place at the start of May 1995, leaving Telemundo without a station in the Philadelphia market. The network affiliated with WTVE in Reading, only to be ousted in 2000 and sign its present outlet, WWSI (then based in Atlantic City), in March 2001.

On August 31, 1998, the Paxson-owned stations formed the nucleus for the new Pax TV network. The station's call sign had been changed that January to WPPX. After changing its name to i: Independent Television in 2005, the network became known as Ion Television in 2007.

== Technical information and subchannels ==
WPPX-TV broadcasts from a transmitter in Philadelphia's Roxborough neighborhood. Its signal is multiplexed:

Subchannels of WPPX-TV
Subchannel	Res.	Short name	Programming
61.1	720p	ION	Ion Television
61.2	480i	IONPlus	Ion Plus
61.3	480i	Laff	Laff
61.4	480i	DEFY	Defy
61.5	480i	BUSTED	Busted
61.6	480i	GameSho	Game Show Central
61.7	480i	QVC	QVC
61.8	480i	HSN	HSN

=== Analog-to-digital conversion ===
WPPX-TV shut down its analog signal, over UHF channel 61, on June 12, 2009, the official date on which full-power television stations in the United States transitioned from analog to digital broadcasts under federal mandate. The station's digital signal continued to broadcast on its pre-transition UHF channel 31, using virtual channel 61.
