= WXSR =

- Quincy, Florida; United States
- Broadcast area: Tallahassee, Florida
- Frequency: 101.5 MHz
- Branding: X 101.5

Programming
- Format: Active rock
- Affiliations: Compass Media Networks; United Stations Radio Networks

Ownership
- Owner: iHeartMedia, Inc.; (iHM Licenses, LLC)
- Sister stations: WTLY, WFLA-FM, WGMY, WTNT-FM

History
- First air date: December 1966
- Former call signs: WCNH-FM (1966–1979); WWSD (1979–1986); WIQI (1986–1991); WFHT (1991–1993)
- Former frequencies: 101.7 MHz (1966–1992)

Technical information
- Licensing authority: FCC
- Facility ID: 25022
- Class: C2
- ERP: 37,000 watts
- HAAT: 149 meters
- Transmitter coordinates: 30°29′32.00″N 84°17′13.00″W

Links
- Public license information: Public file; LMS
- Webcast: Listen Live
- Website: x1015.iheart.com

WXSR (101.5 FM) is a commercial radio station in Quincy, Florida, broadcasting to the Tallahassee, Florida area. WXSR airs an active rock music format branded as "X 101.5". Its studios and transmitter are located separately on the north side of Tallahassee.

== History ==
In December 1966, its sister-station WCNH-FM was launched running separate programming from its sister station WCNH-AM on 101.7 FM, which moved down to 101.5 FM in 1992. The station brought its own urban contemporary format programming when sister station WWSD-AM flipped to gospel music in the early 1990s. Throughout its early years, its call letters became WWSD-FM in 1979, WIQI in 1986, WFHT in 1991, and the current WXSR in June 1993. Approximately one year later in 1994, its Urban contemporary format was dropped for CHR in the early 2000s for its current mainstream rock format.
