= Ion Media =

American television broadcast company

Ion Media Networks, Inc.
- Trade name: Ion Media
- Formerly: Paxson Communications Corporation (1988–2006); Ion Media Networks (2006–2017)
- Type: Subsidiary
- Industry: Mass media; Television broadcasting
- Founded: 1988; 38 years ago
- Founder: Bud Paxson
- Defunct: January 7, 2021; 5 years ago (as independent company)
- Fate: Acquired by the E. W. Scripps Company and spun off into Scripps Networks
- Successors: Scripps Networks; Inyo Broadcast Holdings
- Headquarters: West Palm Beach, Florida, U.S.
- Key people: Lisa Knutson (president; Scripps Networks)
- Products: Television stations group (through Ion Media Television) (prior to reorganization as Ion Media Networks in 2006, Paxson Communications Corporation directly owned Pax's O&O stations); Network-produced programming (through Ion Media Entertainment, Ion Media's in-house production unit; formerly Paxson Entertainment) (was shut down when Ion switched to broadcast syndication in 2007 after rebranding from Pax); Programming distribution (through Paxson Television Distribution) (was shut down when Ion switched to broadcast syndication in 2007 after the network's rebranding from Pax)
- Brands: Ion Television; Ion Plus; Qubo (until 2021); Ion Shop (until 2021); Ion Mystery
- Revenue: US$415 million (2014)
- Owner: E. W. Scripps Company
- Number of employees: 425 (2020)
- Parent: Scripps Networks
- Website: ionmedia.com (archived March 2017)

Ion Media Networks, Inc. (doing business as Ion Media) is an American company owned by the Scripps Networks division of The E.W. Scripps Company that operates the linear broadcasting networks Ion Television, Ion Mystery and Ion Plus.

Formerly known as Paxson Communications Corporation and Ion Media Networks, it emerged from bankruptcy in 2009 and was later sold to E. W. Scripps Company. It once owned over 71 television stations in most of the major American markets through a television station group, as well as operating Qubo and Ion Shop.

Upon being acquired by Scripps, it merged with its subsidiary Katz Broadcasting on January 7, 2021, creating Scripps Networks. This new division was formed to manage those assets separately from the traditional broadcast network-affiliated television stations.

== History ==
=== As Paxson Communications Corporation ===
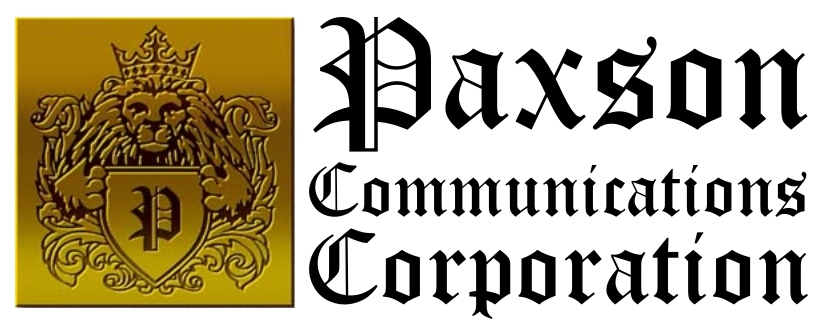
Paxson Communications Corporation logo

The company was founded in 1988 by Bud Paxson in Florida. The company purchased radio stations and a couple of television stations, eventually becoming Florida's largest radio group. The radio stations' formats included rock, contemporary hit radio, news and talk, and adult contemporary. The television stations were network affiliates of ABC and NBC. In 1993 the company began to purchase stations on the outer fringes of large television markets.

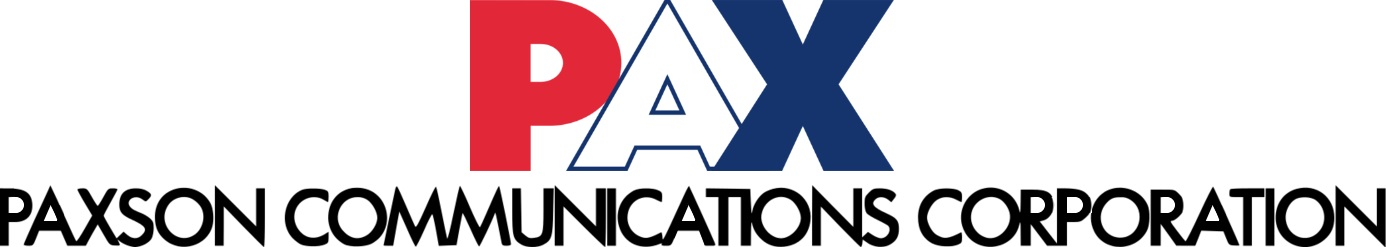
Alternate logo for Paxson Communications Corporation

In 1994, Paxson acquired its first television station, ABC affiliate WPBF in West Palm Beach, Florida.

The company divested its radio holdings to Clear Channel Communications in July 1997, and its major-network affiliated television stations in 1998, focusing on building its own independent TV network, "PAX TV". The company focused on acquiring UHF television stations. Some of these stations are out-of-market stations, such as WPXD in Ann Arbor, Michigan (45 miles (72 km) from Detroit), KXLI in St. Cloud, Minnesota (60 miles (97 km) from Minneapolis), WTLK in Rome, Georgia (45 miles (72 km) from Atlanta), WPXJ in Pavilion, New York (45 miles (72 km) from both Buffalo and Rochester, New York), and WAYK in Melbourne, Florida (60 miles (97 km) from Orlando). Still in some markets the company bought low-rated stations that had the same type of signals as established stations with medium to high ratings. These stations included WCFC in Chicago (religious), WTGI in Wilmington, Delaware (brokered), WAKC in Akron, Ohio (Cleveland's secondary ABC affiliate), and channel 35 in Miami (Shopping), among others. In the fall of 1997, a tentative lineup was announced, and it included a family entertainment lineup of drama shows, movies, first-run shows, wildlife shows, sitcoms, and talk shows. The most expensive station acquisition was WBIS in New York City. The city government had sold this station to Dow Jones & Company and ITT in 1996 for nearly US$200 million. In January 1997, Dow Jones launched a business format called S+ during the day and a sports channel after 7 pm and on weekends. Dow Jones/ITT lost money on the operation, sold the station for about $225 million in May 1997, and shut down S+ that June in favor of Bloomberg Business News, Fox Sports Net and a block previewing new networks, IntroTV. Channel 31 was renamed WPXN with plans to be the flagship station of PAX TV in the fall of 1998.

In February 1997, Paxson chose to acquire Travel Channel from Landmark Communications, then the former owners of The Weather Channel. Later in September, Discovery Communications acquired 70% stake of the channel and Discovery would later give its full control of the channel in 1999. Discovery would later sell Travel Channel to Cox Communications in May 2007. Today, Travel Channel is now owned by Warner Bros. Discovery.

In Pittsburgh, Pennsylvania, the company wanted to buy WPCB, channel 40, from Cornerstone Television, and move the license to channel 16 (which was, and still is, occupied by WINP-TV), with channel 40 used for educational purposes. The two agreed on a purchase price, but the Federal Communications Commission had too many questions about the deal, most relating to the type of broadcast license to be operated on each channel, and it fell through.

The PAX network was launched in 1998 with family dramas such as Life Goes On, Our House, Touched by an Angel, Dr. Quinn, Medicine Woman, Highway to Heaven, and Bonanza, a game show titled The Reel to Reel Picture Show, sitcoms Dave's World, Here's Lucy and The Hogan Family, and some movies. The network ran weekdays from noon until 1 am. Due to low ratings and mounting financial costs, PAX TV soon reduced its hours. In 1999, they were reduced to between 3 pm and midnight, and in 2002, they were reduced again to 6 pm to midnight.

In September 1999, NBC bought a 32% stake in Paxson. On December 4, 2001, it was announced that Paxson had filed with the FCC an arbitration to block NBC's acquisition of Telemundo. In September 2002, it was announced that Paxson's arbitration against NBC was denied. On November 13, NBC requested a redemption of its investment in Paxson of $549.2 million. In August 2004, NBC Universal filed a lawsuit against Paxson. On November 7, 2005, to settle several lawsuits between the company and NBC Universal, Lowell Paxson granted NBCU an 18-month transferable option to purchase his shares of the company in an agreement which, if activated, would also trigger a sale of the rest of the company. If Mr. Paxson's shares of the company weren't sold in the option window, the company was obligated to buy them back from Mr. Paxson. Concurrent with this deal, Mr. Paxson left the company, and was succeeded by R. Brandon Burgess in the role of President and CEO.

=== As Ion Media Networks ===
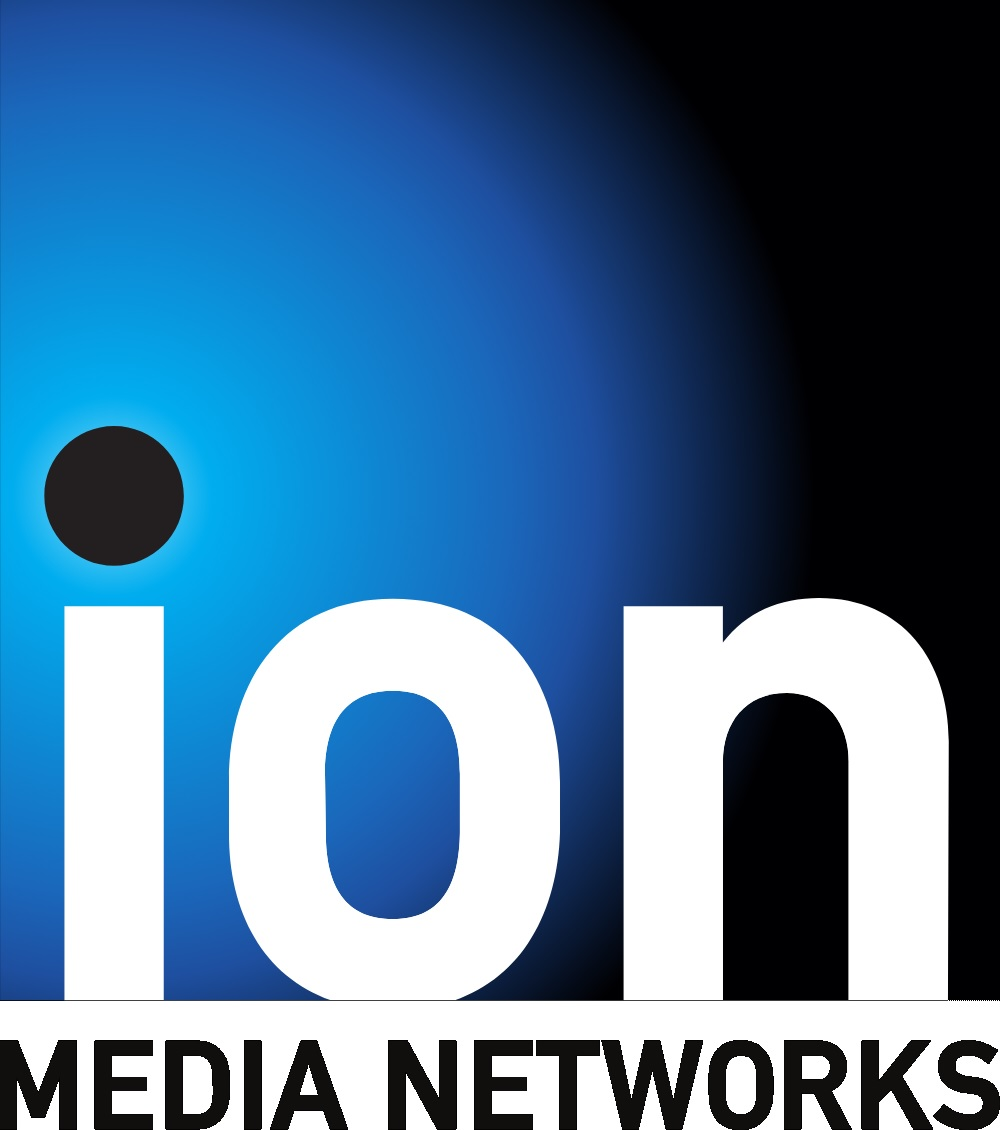
Logo for Ion Media Networks

In early 2006, the company adopted its current name.

A few months later, Ion launched a new children's brand along with NBC Universal (along its now-defunct subsidiary Classic Media), book company Scholastic and Canada-based Corus to plan a weekday afternoon block and a 24/7 channel in January.

In May 2007, Ion, NBC Universal, and Citadel LLC reached an agreement for the recapitalization of Ion. Citadel acquired the public common stock of the company, as part of the plan to take the company private. In addition, Citadel invested $100 million of new capital into the company to further support management's plan to revitalize the TV network.

In November 2007, Ion Media Networks was taken to trial, having been sued in Federal Court by Positive Ions, Inc for trademark infringement of the use of the word Ion, resulting in a $1.7 million settlement awarded to Positive Ions, Inc.

In 2008, Ion Media Networks and Comcast reached an agreement to not only continue to carry Ion Television, but also introduced two new digital networks Qubo (its block launched two years later) and Ion Life. By January 2009, Ion had another subchannel network, Urban TV, in the works with BET founder Robert L. Johnson targeted to African-Americans.

In April 2009, it was announced that Ion Media Networks was once again facing balance sheet problems. The company disclosed that it was in discussions with lenders on "a comprehensive recapitalization" of its balance sheet. That translates to an effort to restructure its considerable debt, which stands at $2.7 billion as of April 2009, according to The Wall Street Journal.

On May 19, 2009, Ion Media Networks filed for Chapter 11 bankruptcy protection, putting the Ion network under bankruptcy for the second time, saying it had reached an agreement with holders of 60% of its first lien secured debt that would extinguish all of its $2.7 billion in legacy debt and preferred stock and recapitalize the company with a $150 million new funding commitment. It emerged from bankruptcy in December, under the ownership of its bondholders & secured lenders/first lien holders, wiping out Citadel's ownership.

In late 2009, a trio of private equity companies (Black Diamond Capital Management, Avenue Capital Group, & Trilogy Capital) purchased a 62.5% controlling stake in Ion Media Networks from the Ion Media Liquidating Trust (the legal entity selling the stake) through their partnership, Media Holdco L.P. (43.7% owned by Black Diamond via its BD Ion Media GP Holdings subsidiary; 15.8% by Trilogy via its Trilogy Ion, LLC subsidiary; & 40.5% by Avenue via its Avenue Ion Holdings LP subsidiary). The remaining 37.5% of Ion Media Networks remained with the company's senior investors from previous rounds of financing.

Ion Media Networks signed carriage agreements in May 2010 with Advanced Cable Communications and Comcast Colorado Springs for Qubo and Ion Life and with Blue Ridge Cable for Qubo.

By 2012, Media Holdco's stake in Ion Media Networks was at 87%, with the company's senior investors from previous rounds of financing holding 13%.

Sometime in 2013, Ion Media Networks signed a deal with Liberty Media to bring the QVC and HSN networks to most of its Ion Television O&O stations throughout nationwide on digital subchannels X.5 and X.6.

In December 2013, the United States bankruptcy court approved a plan by creditors of Roberts Broadcasting to transfer East St. Louis-based WRBU and its sister stations, WZRB in Columbia and WAZE-LP in Evansville, Indiana, to a trust with Ion Media Networks (a creditor in Roberts' chapter 11 bankruptcy proceedings, which it filed for in 2011) as its beneficiary, with Roberts' attorney subsequently stating that Ion Media Networks would purchase the three stations. The deal is complete on February 10, 2014, and both WZRB and WRBU became Ion stations.

Also in December 2013, Black Diamond purchased Avenue & Trilogy's stakes in Media Holdco, placing Black Diamond as Media Holdco's sole shareholder.

As of November 2014, Media Holdco's majority equity stake in Ion Media Networks is at 85%, leaving the company's senior investors from previous rounds of financing with a minority stake of 15%.

=== As Ion Media ===
On April 20, 2017, Ion Media Networks, through its website, announced a name change to "Ion Media" (with the company still legally operating as "Ion Media Networks").

On August 2, 2017, it was reported that 21st Century Fox was proposing that Ion Media contribute its stations into a joint venture with its Fox Television Stations division, to create a larger station group in an effort to counter Sinclair Broadcast Group and their proposed purchase of Tribune Media. The proposal also included the possibility for as many as 26 stations owned by Sinclair or Tribune to be switched from Fox after existing affiliation contracts expire. It has been argued that this deal was intended to place pressure on Sinclair to abandon its acquisition, lest it potentially lose Fox affiliations to the venture.

An analyst felt the proposed partnership was hampered by Ion Media's decision to assert must-carry status over its stations rather than retransmission consent, as Fox would be unable to immediately benefit financially from the partnership's scale, which would have included being able to collect carriage payments for all of the stations. The analyst added that Ion stations alone did not have enough leverage to negotiate with television providers, because of their limited local or first-run programming.

==== Acquisition by Scripps ====
On September 24, 2020, Ion Media agreed to be acquired by The E. W. Scripps Company for $2.65 billion, with Berkshire Hathaway making an investment in Scripps to help finance the purchase. The transaction, which is projected to close in the first quarter of 2021 and is subject to FCC approval, would see Ion Media and its networks combined with Scripps' Katz Broadcasting subsidiary, which already operates five specialty networks, most notably Bounce TV and Court TV. Scripps would also sell 23 of Ion Media's 71 television stations to comply with national ownership caps; the buyer, revealed in an October 2020 FCC filing to be Inyo Broadcast Holdings, has promised to maintain the stations' Ion Television affiliations after the purchase. However, the number of stations to be sold increased according to a Public Applications Report from the FCC on October 16, 2020, and although unconfirmed, it is possible that Scripps could still operates at least some of these stations. Whether or not that pans out remains to be seen. As of October 17, 2020, 27 stations are likely up for sale; however, three of those stations in Philadelphia, San Francisco and Minneapolis are predicated and contingent upon whether Scripps can complete its sale of New York City's WPIX to Mission Broadcasting (to be operated by Nexstar Media Group) in time before these transactions are finalized. If WPIX was sold before these transactions, then those stations will be retained. On October 20, broadcast industry website TV News Check confirmed the pending sales in a "station roundup" report outlining the stations slated to be sold, and the number being reduced to 26 again.

That number, again, is cut down to 23, after Scripps was able to complete its sale of WPIX to Mission Broadcasting on December 30, 2020. As such, Scripps would keep its Ion stations in San Francisco, Philadelphia and Minneapolis.

The transaction, which closed on January 7, 2021, saw Ion Television, Ion Plus, Qubo, and Ion Shop integrated into Scripps' Katz Broadcasting subsidiary (operator of fellow multicast networks Court TV, Ion Mystery, Bounce TV, Laff and Grit).

On January 14, 2021, Scripps announced that it would discontinue Qubo and Ion Shop effective February 28, 2021, with Ion Plus transitioning to a FAST service. The spectrum allocated to the networks on the former Ion Media stations will be repurposed to carry the Katz-owned networks starting March 1, with the initial slate of Ion Television O&Os adding those networks following the expiration of Scripps/Katz's existing contracts with other broadcasting companies the day prior, and other stations following suit as contracts with existing affiliates expire throughout 2021 and 2022; in markets where major network affiliates operated by Scripps already carry a Katz-owned network, some will be offloaded to the Ion stations to free up limited spectrum capacity during the ATSC 3.0 transition. Several of the Ion Plus full-power stations paired with Ion Television stations were also concurrently sold off to Inyo Broadcast Holdings in order to alleviate local ownership conflicts and national cap issues related to Scripps' purchase of Ion Media under the FCC's regulatory station ownership limits.

In October 2021, Scripps notified the Federal Communications Commission that it had closed the local facilities of the Ion Media stations (with those in duopoly markets having their operations consolidated with the existing Scripps commercial station), and consolidated the regulatory 'studios' for all of the stations at Scripps Center in Cincinnati. The FCC had repealed the Main Studio Rule in 2019 requiring a facility for each station in their local market, and for all intents and purposes, the studios were all office suites with almost no broadcast equipment containing mainly the station's public file with a minimum staff of one engineer and one general manager (both often regional and maintaining multiple Ion stations) merely maintaining the network's transmitters. The network's operations remain based out of West Palm Beach.

== See also ==
- Ion Television
- Ion Plus
- Qubo
- Ion Mystery
- List of Ion Television affiliates
- List of stations owned and operated by Ion Media
