= WSFJ-TV =

Television station in London, Ohio

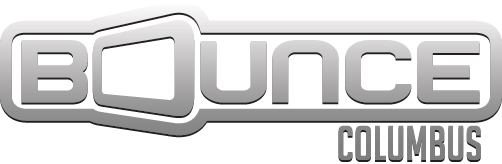
- London–Columbus, Ohio; United States
- City: London, Ohio (Note: Originally licensed to Newark, Ohio; moved to London in 2018.)
- Channels: Digital: 19 (UHF), shared with WCLL-CD; Virtual: 51
- Branding: Bounce TV Columbus

Programming
- Affiliations: 51.1: Bounce TV; 51.2: Ion Mystery

Ownership
- Owner: Ion Media; (Ion Television License, LLC)

History
- First air date: March 9, 1980
- Former channel numbers: Analog: 52 (UHF, 1980–1982), 51 (UHF, 1982–2009); Digital: 24 (UHF, until 2018)
- Former affiliations: Religious Independent (1980–2007); Pax/i/Ion Television (secondary, 1999–2007); TBN (2008–2018); Ion Plus (2018–2021); Bounce TV (2021–May 2024); Scripps News (May–November 2024); Ion Television (November 2024–2025)
- Call sign meaning: "We Stand for Jesus" (referencing former religious format)

Technical information
- Licensing authority: FCC
- Facility ID: 11118
- ERP: 15 kW
- HAAT: 157 m (515 ft)
- Transmitter coordinates: 39°58′16″N 83°1′40″W

Links
- Public license information: Public file; LMS

WSFJ-TV (channel 51) is a television station licensed to London, Ohio, United States, broadcasting the digital multicast network Bounce TV to the Columbus area. Owned by the Ion Media subsidiary of the E. W. Scripps Company, the station maintains studios on North Central Drive in Lewis Center, Ohio.

Even though WSFJ-TV is licensed as a full-power station, its broadcasting radius only covers the immediate Columbus area, as it shares spectrum with low-power, Class A Daystar station WCLL-CD, which transmits from a tower on Twin Rivers Drive near downtown Columbus. Therefore, WSFJ-TV relies on cable and satellite carriage to reach the entire market.

== History ==
WSFJ-TV began operations on March 9, 1980, broadcasting on UHF channel 52. Originally licensed to Newark, 30 miles (48 km) east of Columbus, it was the market's first independent television station, and the first new commercial station in the area since 1949. The new station ran only Christian programs, including The PTL Club, Jimmy Swaggart, The 700 Club, Another Life, and children's programming. In the fall of 1980, WSFJ began running secular programming such as Independent Network News and New Zoo Revue during the weekdays, along with Wild Kingdom and other hunting and wildlife shows on Saturdays. However, the schedule remained predominantly Christian, and its policy regarding secular programming was very conservative so as not to offend the sensibilities of its mostly fundamentalist and Pentecostal viewership. The station moved to channel 51 on June 29, 1982, almost two years following a Federal Communications Commission (FCC) revision to the television Table of Assignments to accommodate Canada's reservation of channels 70 to 83 for land mobile use.

In February 1999, the station had a secondary affiliation with Pax TV (later i: Independent Television, now Ion Television), running the network's programming from 11 a.m. to 7 p.m. and again from 10 p.m. to 1 a.m. WSFJ also began to be seen on a translator in Columbus, WCPX-LP (channel 48), which was owned by Pax's parent company, Paxson Communications (now Ion Media). Before this, Pax programming was seen overnights on WWHO, a WB affiliate then owned by the Paramount Stations Group. WSFJ was the largest Ion affiliate owned by a company other than Ion Media Networks.

Logo as GTN51

WSFJ was sold to Guardian Enterprise Group in 2004. In 2005, WSFJ began to acquire some family-friendly programming separate from its affiliation with Pax/i and rebranded the station as "GTN51"—short for "Guardian Television Network". Guardian Enterprise Group was located in the same office as WSFJ. Other companies under the Guardian Enterprise Group include Guardian Studios and Guardian Human Resources.

In March 2007, WSFJ moved its master control and studio into a facility at Easton Town Center, which generated the content that was sent to their new digital transmission facility in Pataskala, off of SR 161. That year, WSFJ launched its digital signal on channel 24.

Ion sold WCPX-LP in 2007, and in January 2008 it was relaunched as an Azteca América affiliate. At the same time, Ion programming disappeared from WSFJ, leaving it exclusively with family entertainment, religious shows, and paid programming. Ion's main program feed would later resurface in the market on the third subchannel of WCMH-TV.

In July 2008, it was announced that Guardian would sell WSFJ to the Trinity Broadcasting Network for $16 million. Guardian retained its other properties, including the then-upcoming .2 Network, and acquired W23BZ, which had been a low-power repeater of TBN; it picked up WSFJ's programming when channel 51 began carrying TBN programming on October 1, 2008. However, by selling off its full-power station and moving to a low-power signal, GTN would find themselves at a disadvantage—being on a low-power signal, it lost its must-carry status; as a result, Guardian urged viewers to contact their cable systems to pick up GTN after the move to channel 23.

As a TBN-owned station, WSFJ served as a pass-through for the TBN national feed with virtually no local programming. TBN has long been known for buying existing stations in order to get must-carry status on local cable systems. In 2011, the station began work on a new television studio in Lewis Center, Ohio, in Delaware County.

TBN entered into an option agreement with Ion Media Networks on November 14, 2017, which gave Ion the option to acquire the licenses of WSFJ-TV and three other TBN stations serving Ohio and Indiana–WDLI-TV in Canton, WKOI-TV in the Dayton area, and WCLJ-TV in Indianapolis–all of whom had sold their spectrum in the Federal Communications Commission (FCC)'s incentive auction; Ion exercised the option on May 24, 2018. The sale was completed on September 25, 2018 and the next day, all TBN programming was dropped for Ion Life (later Ion Plus), which had not been carried in the Columbus market previously. Ion Media has pursued a new strategy since 2018 of giving Ion Life a primary channel placement (mainly involving purchases and shuffles related to the incentive auction) in order to require local cable and satellite providers to offer the channel under must-carry provisions.

After E. W. Scripps Company ceased operations of Ion Plus, WSFJ changed its primary affiliation to Bounce TV and added Grit (later Newsy and Scripps News) on channel 51.2. On May 5, 2024, Scripps News and Bounce switched their channel positions.

On November 16, 2024, after Scripps News ceased operations over-the-air, the station flipped back to an Ion Television affiliate after 16 years.

In June 2025, the station dropped Ion again and flipped back to Bounce TV after over a year on DT2.

== Technical information ==
=== Subchannels ===
Subchannels of WCLL-CD and WSFJ-TV
License	Subchannel	Res.	Short name	Programming
WCLL-CD	19.1	1080i	WCLL-CD	Daystar
WCLL-CD	19.2	720p	WCLL-ES	Daystar Español
WSFJ-TV	51.1	480i	WSFJ	Bounce TV
WSFJ-TV	51.2	480i	WSFJ	Ion Mystery

For some time after TBN took over the station, WSFJ did not multiplex its signal, unlike the other TBN-owned stations. However, in July 2012, WSFJ upgraded its studios and equipment, and carried the TBN affiliated subchannels seen on all other full power TBN stations until September 2018.

=== Analog-to-digital conversion ===
WSFJ-TV shut down its analog signal, over UHF channel 51, on April 16, 2009, the date TBN-owned full-power stations permanently ceased analog transmissions. The station's digital signal remained on its pre-transition UHF channel 24, using virtual channel 51.
