= Rerun =

Rebroadcast of an episode of a radio or TV program

A rerun or repeat is a rebroadcast of an episode of a radio or television program. The two types of reruns are those that occur during a hiatus and those that occur when a program is syndicated.

== Variations ==
In the United Kingdom, the word "repeat" refers only to a single episode; "rerun" or "rerunning" is the preferred term for an entire series/season. A "repeat" is a single episode of a series that is broadcast outside its original timeslot on the same channel/network. The episode is usually the "repeat" of the scheduled episode that was broadcast in the original timeslot earlier the previous week. It allows viewers who were not able to watch the show in its timeslot to catch up before the next episode is broadcast. The term "rerun" can also be used in some respects as a synonym for "reprint", the equivalent term for print items; this is especially true for print items that are part of ongoing series such as comic strips (Peanuts, for instance, has been in reruns since the retirement and death of creator Charles M. Schulz). In South Africa, reruns of the mixed-language daily soap opera 7de Laan and others are called an omnibus, which is a weekly rerun that is broadcast on a Sunday afternoon on the original channel/network. It only broadcasts the past week's episodes back-to-back.

When used to refer to the rebroadcast of a single episode, Lucille Ball and Desi Arnaz are generally credited as the inventors of the rerun. It was first used for the American television series I Love Lucy (1951–57) during Ball's pregnancy. Prior to I Love Lucy rerunning its episodes during the summer, shows typically went on a summer hiatus and were replaced with summer replacements, generally lower-priority programs; this strategy has seen increased use in the 21st century as fewer episodes have been produced each season and in-season reruns have increased. Rod Serling's 1955 teleplay Patterns was credited with proving reruns' viability. Buoyed by strong word of mouth, the rerun of Patterns drew more viewers than the first run as people who had missed the first airing a month prior tuned in to catch the re-airing.

== Reruns in the United States ==
In the United States, most television shows from the late 1940s and early 1950s were performed live, and in many cases, they were never recorded. Television networks in the United States, however, began making kinescope recordings of shows broadcast live from the East Coast (such as New York, etc.), which allowed the show to be broadcast later for the West Coast (such as Hollywood, etc.). These kinescopes, along with previously filmed shows, and later, videotape, paved the way for extensive reruns of syndicated television series.

=== During hiatus ===
In the United States, currently running shows can leave their regular timeslot, or rerun older episodes from the same season, either to fill the time slot with the same program on the same network, or in a slot outside its usual schedule during the "off-season" period when no new episodes are being made. Shows tend to start leaving slots or staying on to rerun episodes after the November sweeps period (the ratings that determine the cost of a commercial run during that time slot), and usually show only reruns from mid-December until mid-January or even February sweeps. This winter (or "mid-season") phase is also used to try out new shows that did not make it onto the fall schedule to see how they fare with the public. These series usually run six to 13 episodes. If they do well with the public, they may get a renewal for a half (13 weeks) or full season in the new schedule. Shows that are recently popular return from February sweeps until the end of the season (which sometimes ends before May sweeps) with only limited absences or reruns used.

The number of episodes per season, originally well over 30 episodes during the 1950s and 1960s, dropped below 26 (the number of episodes required to fill a time slot for a year without rerunning any episode more than once) in the 1970s. Specials typically pad out the remainder of the schedule.

=== Television specials ===
Often, if a television special such as Peter Pan or a network television broadcast of a classic film such as The Wizard of Oz is especially well received, it will be rerun from time to time. Before the VCR era, this would be the only opportunity audiences had of seeing a program more than once.

Seasonal programming such as How the Grinch Stole Christmas, The Ten Commandments, It's a Wonderful Life, or the animated Charlie Brown television specials are normally reshown each year, for the appropriate holiday season.

=== Syndication ===
A television program goes into syndication when many episodes of the program are sold as a package. Generally, the buyer is either a cable channel or an owner of local television stations. Often, programs are not particularly profitable until they are sold for syndication. Since local television stations often need to sell more commercial airtime than network affiliates, syndicated shows are usually edited to make room for extra commercials. Often, about 100 episodes (four to five seasons' worth) are required for a weekly series to be rerun in daily syndication (at least four times a week). Very popular series running more than four seasons may start daily reruns of the first seasons, while production and airings continue of the current season's episodes; until around the early 1980s, shows that aired in syndication while still in production had the reruns aired under an alternate name (or multiple alternate names, as was the case with Death Valley Days) to differentiate the reruns from the first-run episodes.

Few people anticipated the long life that a popular television series would eventually have in syndication, so most performers signed contracts that limited residual payments to about six repeats. After that, the actors received nothing and the production company would keep 100% of any income until the copyright expired; many shows did not even have their copyrights renewed and others were systematically destroyed, such was the lack of awareness of the potential for revenue from them. This situation went unchanged until the mid-1970s, when contracts for new shows extended residual payments for the performers, regardless of the number of reruns, while tape recycling effectively came to an end (rapid advancements in digital video in the 1990s made preservation far more economical) and the Copyright Act of 1976 extended copyright terms to much longer lengths, eliminating the need for renewal.

Once a series is no longer performing well enough to be sold in syndication, it may still remain in barter syndication, in which television stations are offered the program for free in exchange for a requirement to air additional advertisements (without compensation) bundled with the free program during other shows (barter syndication is far more common, if not the norm, in radio, where only the most popular programs charge rights fees). The Program Exchange was once the most prominent barter syndicator in United States television, offering mostly older series from numerous network libraries. Barter syndicated series may be seen on smaller, independent stations with small budgets or as short-term filler on larger stations; they tend not to be as widely syndicated as programs syndicated with a rights fee. Free ad-supported streaming television (FAST) relies on the barter model for its revenue.

=== Classic television ===
With the growing availability of cable and satellite television channels, as well as over-the-air digital subchannels, combined with a growing body of available post-syndication programming, a handful of specialty channels have been built solely or primarily to run former network programming, which otherwise would no longer be in syndication. Branded as "classic television", these often carry reruns of programming dating back to the black-and-white television era and are promoted as nostalgia. Depending on the programs chosen for a classic network, running the format can be very inexpensive, due to many shows beginning to fall into the public domain.

On cable and satellite, channels that devote at least some of their programming schedule to post-syndication reruns include Nickelodeon's nighttime block Nick at Nite and spin-off TV Land, Logo TV, Pop, and Nicktoons (all owned by Paramount Skydance), along with TBS, Discovery Family, Boomerang (owned by Warner Bros. Discovery) with Game Show Network (owned by Sony Pictures Television), USA Network (owned by Versant), INSP, FETV, RFD-TV, Hallmark Channel and early on, NewsNation (formerly known as WGN America). Equity Media Holdings had been using low-power television stations to carry its own Retro TV in various US markets; those stations were, as a result of Equity going bankrupt, sold to religious broadcaster Daystar Television Network. Since the early 2010s, the growth of digital subchannel networks has allowed for increasing specialization of these classic networks: in addition to general-interest program networks such as MeTV, MeTV+, Great, Antenna TV and Rewind TV, there exist networks solely for comedies (Catchy Comedy, Roar, and Laff), game shows (Buzzr), ethnic-oriented programs (Bounce TV, Dabl, and TheGrio), lifestyle and reality programming (Story Television, TrueReal, Defy TV, Twist, and Quest), westerns (Grit, WEST, and Heroes & Icons), music video programming (Circle Country), sports programming (Stadium and SportsGrid), sci-fi and action programming (Comet and Charge!), true crime and court programming (True Crime Network, Court TV, Ion Mystery, and Start TV), news programming (Newsy), and feature films (Movies!, and now-defunct This TV).

Traditionally, shows most likely to be rerun in this manner are scripted comedies and dramas. Such shows are more likely to be considered evergreen content that can be rerun for a long period of time without losing its cultural relevance. Game shows, variety shows, Saturday-morning cartoons, and to a lesser extent, news magazines, tabloid talk shows, and late-night talk shows (often in edited form) have been seen less commonly in reruns; game shows can quickly become dated because of inflation, while talk shows often draw humor from contemporary events. Tabloid talk shows, with episode archives of thousands of episodes, tend to do well in reruns compared to talk shows without an element of conflict. Newsmagazines, especially those that focus on evergreen stories such as true crime, are easily repackaged for the syndication market, which (along with much lower residuals compared to a scripted series with star talent) can also make them cheaper than a first-run program or scripted reruns. Most variants of reality television have proven to be a comparative failure in reruns, due to a number of factors (high cast turnover, loss of the element of surprise, overall hostility toward the format, and lack of media cross-promotion among them); some self-contained and personality-driven reality shows have been successfully rerun. Reruns of sports broadcasts, which face many of the same issues reality shows face, have found a niche on multichannel television and free ad-supported streaming television.

=== DVD retail ===
With the rise of the DVD video format, box sets featuring season or series runs of television series have become an increasingly important retail item. Some view this development as a rising new idea in the industry of reruns as an increasingly major revenue source in themselves instead of the standard business model as a draw for audiences for advertising. While there were videotape releases of television series before DVD, the format's limited content capacity, large size and reliance on mechanical winding made it impractical as a widespread retail item. Many series (such as Modern Family (2009–20) and Grey's Anatomy) may release DVD sets of the prior season between the end of that season and the beginning of the next.

Some television programs that are released on DVD (particularly those that have been out of production for several years) may not have all of the seasons released, either due to poor overall sales or prohibitive costs for obtaining rights to music used in the program; one such incidence is Perfect Strangers, which has seldom been in wide syndication since the late 1990s primarily due to lack of demand, which had only a DVD set of the first and second seasons released due to the expensiveness of relicensing songs used in later seasons of the series that are performed by the show's two lead characters. In some cases, series whose later season releases have been held up for these reasons may have the remaining seasons made available on DVD, often after a distributor that does not hold syndication rights to the program (such as Shout! Studios) secures the rights for future DVD releases.

=== TV listings ===
TV Guide originally used the term "rerun" to designate rebroadcast programs but abruptly changed to "repeat" between April and May in 1971.

Other TV listings services and publications, including local newspapers, often indicated reruns as "(R)"; since the early 2000s, many listing services only provide a notation if an episode is new -"(N)", with reruns getting no notation.

== Reruns internationally ==
Reruns are often carried by Canadian broadcasters in much the same way as they are in the United States, especially on specialty television channels that rely largely on off-network or library rights to programs (and in many cases, may originate little to no first run programming of their own). Reruns of a broadcaster's own library programs are often used to comply with Canadian content regulations enforced by the CRTC, requiring that a minimum of the broadcaster's programming be dedicated to programming that is produced by Canadians.

In the United Kingdom, most drama and comedy series run for shorter seasons – typically six, seven, or thirteen episodes – and are then replaced by others. An exception is soap operas, which are either on all year-round (for example, EastEnders and Coronation Street), or are on for a season similar to the American format.

As in the United States, fewer new episodes are made during the summer. Until recently, the BBC, ITV and Channel 4 commonly repeated classic shows from their archives, but this has more or less dried up in favor of newer (and cheaper) formats such as reality shows, except on the BBC, where older BBC shows, especially sitcoms, including Dad's Army and Fawlty Towers, are frequently repeated.

Syndication did not exist as such in United Kingdom until the arrival of satellite, cable, and later, from 1998 on, digital television, although many ITV programs up to the early 1990s, particularly imported programming, were syndicated in the sense that each ITV region bought some programs independently of the ITV Network, and in particular many programs out of primetime made by smaller ITV stations were "part-networked" where some regions would show them and others would not. Nowadays, many channels in the UK (for example, Gold) repackage and rebroadcast "classic" programming from both sides of the Atlantic. Some of these channels, like their American counterparts, make commercial timing cuts; others get around this by running shows in longer time slots, and critics of timing cuts see no reason why all channels should not do the same.

It has been common practice by networks, notably the BBC, to rerun some series after they have not fared particularly well on their original run. This was particularly common with sitcoms such as The Office, which had very low ratings in its first series, as well as a poor reception from both critics and focus groups and was almost cancelled. The series started to gain traction once the BBC decided to repeat it in a different timeslot and The Office went on to be an award-winning and critically acclaimed show which has regularly featured in lists of the Best Sitcoms ever. In 2019, the series was ranked 6th on The Guardian's list of the 100 best TV shows of the 21st century.

Early on in the history of British television, agreements with the actors' union Equity and other trade bodies limited the number of times a single program could be broadcast, usually only twice, and these showings were limited to within a set time period such as five years. This was due to the unions' fear that the channels filling their schedules with repeats could put actors and other production staff out of work as fewer new shows would be made. It also had the unintentional side effect of causing many programs to be junked after their repeat rights had expired, as they were considered to be of no further use by the broadcasters. Although these agreements changed during the 1980s and beyond, it is still expensive to repeat archive television series on British terrestrial television, as new contracts have to be drawn up and payments made to the artists concerned. Repeats on multichannel television are cheaper, as are re-showings of newer programs covered by less strict repeat clauses. Programs are no longer destroyed, however, as the historical and cultural reasons for keeping them have now been seen and the cost to maintain archives is now far less, even if the programs have little or no repeat value.

== See also ==
- First run
