= WCLJ-TV =

Television station in Bloomington, Indiana

- Bloomington–Indianapolis, Indiana; United States
- City: Bloomington, Indiana
- Channels: Digital: 28 (UHF), shared with WIPX-TV; Virtual: 42
- Branding: Bounce TV Indianapolis

Programming
- Affiliations: 42.1: Bounce TV

Ownership
- Owner: Inyo Broadcast Holdings (sale to the E. W. Scripps Company pending); (Inyo Broadcast Licenses LLC)
- Sister stations: WIPX-TV

History
- First air date: August 27, 1987
- Former call signs: WCLJ (1987–2008)
- Former channel numbers: Analog: 42 (UHF, 1987–2009); Digital: 56 (UHF, until 2009), 42 (UHF, 2009–2018), 27 (UHF, 2018–2019)
- Former affiliations: TBN (1987–2018); Ion Plus (2018–2021); Bounce TV (2021–2024); Scripps News (2024); Court TV (2024–2025)

Technical information
- Licensing authority: FCC
- Facility ID: 68007
- ERP: 175 kW
- HAAT: 310.7 m (1,019 ft)
- Transmitter coordinates: 39°24′12″N 86°8′50″W

Links
- Public license information: Public file; LMS

WCLJ-TV (channel 42) is a television station licensed to Bloomington, Indiana, United States, serving the Indianapolis area as an affiliate of the digital multicast network Bounce TV. It is owned by Inyo Broadcast Holdings alongside Ion Television affiliate WIPX-TV (channel 63, also licensed to Bloomington). WCLJ-TV and WIPX-TV share offices on Production Drive (near I-74/I-465) in southwestern Indianapolis; through a channel sharing agreement, the two stations transmit using WIPX-TV's spectrum from an antenna on SR 252 in Trafalgar, Indiana.

== History ==
The station was built by the Trinity Broadcasting Network (TBN) and first went on the air on August 27, 1987.

TBN entered into an agreement with Ion Media Networks on November 14, 2017, which gave Ion the option to acquire the licenses of WCLJ-TV and three other TBN stations that had sold their spectrum in the Federal Communications Commission (FCC)'s incentive auction. Ion exercised the option on May 24, 2018. The sale was completed on September 25, 2018, creating a duopoly with existing Ion Television station WIPX-TV. Ion immediately moved Ion Life (later Ion Plus) to the station in order to provide the network with full-market coverage equivalent to that of WIPX-DT1; since then, the station has aired various digital subchannels, all of them owned by Scripps Networks.

WCLJ and WIPX were included among Ion Media stations spun off to Inyo Broadcast Holdings in 2020, as the E. W. Scripps Company could not own those stations and WRTV. Scripps announced its repurchase of all Inyo stations on February 26, 2026.

== Technical information ==
=== Subchannels ===
Subchannels of WIPX-TV and WCLJ-TV
License	Subchannel	Res.	Short name	Programming
WIPX-TV	63.1	720p	ION	Ion Television
WIPX-TV	63.2	480i	CourtTV	Court TV
WIPX-TV	63.3	480i	BUSTED	Busted
WIPX-TV	63.4	480i	Mystery	Ion Mystery
WIPX-TV	63.5	480i	IONPlus	Ion Plus
WIPX-TV	63.6	480i	GameSho	Game Show Central
WIPX-TV	63.8	480i	QVC2	QVC2
WCLJ-TV	42.1	720p	Bounce	Bounce TV

On June 1, 2015, JUCE and Smile of a Child were consolidated into a single network on the third subchannel to accommodate the addition of a new network, TBN Salsa, on the fifth subchannel where Smile of a Child used to reside. As a result of the change, children's programming that previously aired on Smile of a Child was carried on 42.3 from 7 a.m. to 7 p.m. On April 1, 2018, the channel switched off its non-shared signal, leaving it to air only on its new frequency shared with WIPX-TV.

=== Analog-to-digital conversion ===
WCLJ-TV shut down its analog signal, over UHF channel 42, on February 17, 2009, earlier than the June 12, 2009, official date on which full-power television stations in the United States transitioned from analog to digital broadcasts under federal mandate. The station's digital signal relocated from its pre-transition UHF channel 56, which was among the high band UHF channels (52–69) that were removed from broadcasting use as a result of the transition, to its analog-era frequency, UHF channel 42.
