= List of Ion Mystery affiliates =

This is a list of affiliates for Ion Mystery, a digital subchannel network owned by the Ion Media division of the E. W. Scripps Company.

== Affiliates ==
List of Ion Mystery affiliates
Media market	State/District	Station	Channel	Notes
Birmingham	Alabama	WIAT	42.2	
Dothan	Alabama	WDHN	18.2	
Huntsville	Alabama	WZDX	54.4	
Mobile	Alabama	WALA-TV	10.4	
Montgomery	Alabama	WALE-LD	17.3	
Anchorage	Alaska	KAUU	5.6	
Fairbanks	Alaska	KATN	2.5	
Flagstaff	Arizona	KFPH-DT	13.4	
Phoenix	Arizona	KASW	61.4	
Phoenix	Arizona	KFPH-CD	35.4	
Tucson	Arizona	KUVE-DT	46.4	
Tucson	Arizona	KVOA-TV	4.3	
Fort Smith	Arkansas	KFTA-TV	24.3	
Little Rock	Arkansas	KLRT-TV	16.2	
Bakersfield	California	KBTF-CD	31.3	
Fresno	California	KGPE	47.2	
Fresno	California	KFTV-DT	21.3	
Los Angeles	California	KFTR-DT	46.3	
Los Angeles	California	KHIZ-LD	39.1	
Monterey–Salinas	California	KMMD-CD	39.4	
Sacramento	California	KUVS-DT	19.4	
San Diego	California	KGTV	10.4	
San Francisco	California	KDTV-DT	14.4	
Denver	Colorado	KCEC	14.4	
Grand Junction	Colorado	KFQX	4.3	
Grand Junction	Colorado	KKCO	11.5	
Hartford	Connecticut	WFSB	3.2	
Washington	District of Columbia	WPXW-TV	66.5	
Jacksonville	Florida	WJXX	25.4	
Jacksonville	Florida	WPXC-TV	21.3	
Miami	Florida	WLTV-DT	23.3	
Orlando	Florida	WFTV	9.3	
Orlando	Florida	WOPX-TV	56.3	
Orlando	Florida	WRCF-CD	29.1	
Orlando	Florida	WVEN-TV	43.4	
Panama City	Florida	WMBB	13.3	
Tampa	Florida	WFLA-TV	8.3	
Tampa	Florida	WVEA-TV	50.4	
West Palm Beach	Florida	WPXP-TV	67.3	
Atlanta	Georgia	WPXA-TV	14.4	
Atlanta	Georgia	WUVG-DT	34.4	
Augusta	Georgia	WJBF	6.4	
Columbus	Georgia	WXTX	54.3	
Macon	Georgia	WMGT-TV	41.4	
Savannah	Georgia	WSCG	34.5	
Honolulu	Hawaii	KGMB	5.3	
Boise	Idaho	KIVI-TV	6.3	
Idaho Falls–Pocatello	Idaho	KVUI	31.6	
Twin Falls	Idaho	KSAW-LD	6.3	(Note: Semi-satellite of KIVI-TV.)
Chicago	Illinois	WXFT-DT	60.2	
Peoria	Illinois	WMBD-TV	31.4	
Rockford	Illinois	WQRF-TV	39.3	
Springfield–Champaign	Illinois	WCIX	49.3	
Evansville	Indiana	WTVW	7.3	
Fort Wayne	Indiana	WANE-TV	15.4	
Indianapolis	Indiana	WIPX-TV	63.4	
South Bend	Indiana	WSJV	28.3	
Davenport	Iowa	WHBF-TV	4.4	
Des Moines	Iowa	KFPX-TV	39.4	
Iowa City	Iowa	KWKB	20.2	
Sioux City	Iowa	KCAU-TV	9.2	
Topeka	Kansas	KTMJ-CD	43.2	
Wichita	Kansas	KDCU-DT	31.3	
Bowling Green	Kentucky	WCZU-LD	39.6	
Lexington	Kentucky	WTVQ-DT	36.5	
Louisville	Kentucky	WMYO-CD	24.3	
Alexandria	Louisiana	WNTZ-TV	48.3	
Baton Rouge	Louisiana	WBXH-CD	39.4	
Lafayette	Louisiana	KLFY-TV	10.4	
Lake Charles	Louisiana	KPLC-TV	7.6	
New Orleans	Louisiana	WVUE	8.4	
Shreveport	Louisiana	KSHV-TV	45.2	
West Monroe	Louisiana	KTVE	10.4	
Portland	Maine	WPXT	51.3	
Baltimore	Maryland	WMAR-TV	2.4	
Hagerstown	Maryland	WDVM-TV	25.2	
Salisbury	Maryland	WGDV-LD	32.5	
Boston	Massachusetts	WBPX-TV	68.2	
Boston	Massachusetts	WFXT	25.2	
Springfield	Massachusetts	WWLP	22.4	
Detroit	Michigan	WMYD	20.3	
Escanaba–Marquette	Michigan	WJMN-TV	3.2	
Flint	Michigan	WAQP	49.5	
Grand Rapids	Michigan	WXSP-CD	15.3	
Grand Rapids	Michigan	WZPX-TV	43.5	
Traverse City	Michigan	WMNN-LD	26.4	
Duluth	Minnesota	KDLH	3.5	
Minneapolis–St. Paul	Minnesota	K33LN-D	33.2	
Minneapolis–St. Paul	Minnesota	KPXM-TV	41.4	
Rochester	Minnesota	KXLT-TV	47.4	
Hattiesburg	Mississippi	WHLT	22.4	
Jackson	Mississippi	WLBT	3.5	
Columbia–Jefferson City	Missouri	KQFX-LD	22.4	
Joplin	Missouri	KSNF	16.3	
Kansas City	Missouri	KMCI-TV	38.3	
St. Joseph	Missouri	KNPN-LD	26.4	
Springfield	Missouri	KOZL-TV	27.2	
Billings	Montana	KSVI	6.3	
Lincoln	Nebraska	KLKN	8.3	
Omaha	Nebraska	KMTV-TV	3.4	
Las Vegas	Nevada	KVVU-TV	5.3	
Manchester	New Hampshire	WPXG-TV	21.2	(Note: Satellite of WBPX-TV.)
Albuquerque	New Mexico	KASY-TV	50.2	
Albany	New York	WTEN	10.4	
Binghamton	New York	WIVT	34.4	
Buffalo	New York	WKBW-TV	7.3	
Elmira	New York	WETM-TV	18.4	
New York City	New York	WFTY-DT	67.5	
New York City	New York	WJLP	33.4	
Rochester	New York	WROC-TV	8.4	
Syracuse	New York	WSPX-TV	56.4	
Watertown	New York	WWTI	50.4	
Charlotte	North Carolina	WAXN-TV	64.3	
Greensboro	North Carolina	WFMY-TV	2.3	
Greenville	North Carolina	WNCT-TV	9.4	
Raleigh–Durham	North Carolina	WRAL-TV	5.4	
Raleigh–Durham	North Carolina	WRPX-TV	47.3	
Wilmington	North Carolina	WECT	6.5	
Bismarck	North Dakota	KXMB-TV	12.4	
Dickinson	North Dakota	KXMA-TV	2.4	
Fargo–Valley City	North Dakota	KRDK-TV	4.7	
Minot	North Dakota	KXMC-TV	13.4	
Williston	North Dakota	KXMD-TV	11.4	
Cincinnati	Ohio	WCPO-TV	9.4	
Cleveland	Ohio	WQHS-DT	61.4	
Cleveland	Ohio	WVPX-TV	23.4	
Columbus	Ohio	WCBZ-CD	22.3	
Dayton	Ohio	WDTN	2.2	
Toledo	Ohio	WUPW	36.3	
Oklahoma City	Oklahoma	KAUT-TV	43.3	
Tulsa	Oklahoma	KTPX-TV	44.5	
Bend	Oregon	KFXO-CD	39.4	
Portland	Oregon	KPDX	49.2	
Altoona–Johnstown	Pennsylvania	WTAJ-TV	10.2	
Erie	Pennsylvania	WJET-TV	24.2	
Philadelphia	Pennsylvania	WDPN-TV	2.3	
Pittsburgh	Pennsylvania	WINP-TV	16.4	
Pittsburgh	Pennsylvania	WOSC-CD	61.5	
Scranton	Pennsylvania	WYOU	22.2	
San Juan	Puerto Rico	W05DK-D	29.10	
Providence	Rhode Island	WLNE-TV	6.3	
Columbia	South Carolina	WKTC	63.5	
Columbia	South Carolina	WZRB	47.3	
Greenville	South Carolina	WHNS	21.3	
Myrtle Beach	South Carolina	WBTW	13.4	
Rapid City	South Dakota	KCLO-TV	15.4	
Sioux Falls	South Dakota	KELO-TV	11.4	
Chattanooga	Tennessee	WDEF-TV	12.3	
Chattanooga	Tennessee	WKSY-LD	21.2	
Knoxville	Tennessee	WPXK-TV	54.4	
Jackson	Tennessee	WJKT	16.2	
Kingsport–Johnson City	Tennessee	WKPT-TV	19.4	
Memphis	Tennessee	WHBQ-TV	13.2	
Nashville	Tennessee	WKRN-TV	2.2	
Nashville	Tennessee	WSMV-TV	4.2	
Abilene	Texas	KTAB-TV	32.3	
Amarillo	Texas	KCIT	14.3	
Austin	Texas	KNVA	54.4	
Austin	Texas	KAKW-DT	62.4	
El Paso	Texas	KTSM-TV	9.3	
Dallas–Fort Worth	Texas	KUVN-DT	23.3	
Harlingen–McAllen	Texas	KGBT-TV	4.5	
Houston	Texas	KEHO-LD	32.2	
Houston	Texas	KXLN-DT	45.3	
Lubbock	Texas	KAMC	28.2	
Midland-Odessa	Texas	KMID	2.3	
San Angelo	Texas	KLST-TV	8.3	
San Antonio	Texas	KNIC-DT	17.2	
San Antonio	Texas	KPXL-TV	26.4	
Tyler–Longview	Texas	KFXK-TV	51.3	
Tyler–Longview	Texas	KQKT-LD	21.1	
Wichita Falls	Texas	KJTL	18.4	
Salt Lake City	Utah	KSTU	13.4	
Salt Lake City	Utah	KUTH-DT	32.4	
Burlington	Vermont	WFFF-TV	44.2	
Norfolk	Virginia	WSKY-TV	4.2	
Norfolk	Virginia	WPXV-TV	49.3	
Richmond	Virginia	WWBT	12.3	
Roanoke	Virginia	WFXR	27.4	
Roanoke	Virginia	WPXR-TV	38.4	
Seattle–Tacoma	Washington	KCPQ	13.3	
Spokane	Washington	KGPX-TV	34.4	
Bluefield	West Virginia	WLFB	40.4	
Clarksburg	West Virginia	WBOY-TV	12.3	
Huntington-Charleston	West Virginia	WOWK-TV	13.2	
Martinsburg	West Virginia	WWPX-TV	60.5	(Note: Satellite of WPXW-TV.)
Wheeling	West Virginia	WTRF-TV	7.4	
Eau Claire-La Crosse	Wisconsin	WEUX	48.3	
Green Bay	Wisconsin	WACY-TV	32.3	
Madison	Wisconsin	WIFS	57.6	
Milwaukee	Wisconsin	WTMJ-TV	4.5	
Wausau	Wisconsin	WTPX-TV	46.3	
