= WIPX-TV =

Television station in Bloomington, Indiana

- Bloomington–Indianapolis, Indiana; United States
- Channels: Digital: 28 (UHF), shared with WCLJ-TV; Virtual: 63

Programming
- Affiliations: 63.1: Ion Television; for others, see § Subchannels

Ownership
- Owner: Inyo Broadcast Holdings (sale to the E. W. Scripps Company pending); (Inyo Broadcast Licenses LLC)
- Sister stations: WCLJ-TV

History
- First air date: December 27, 1988
- Former call signs: WIIB (1988–1998)
- Former channel numbers: Analog: 63 (UHF, 1988–2009); Digital: 27 (UHF, until 2019)
- Former affiliations: HSN (1988–1995); inTV (1995–1998)
- Call sign meaning: Indianapolis Pax

Technical information
- Licensing authority: FCC
- Facility ID: 10253
- ERP: 175 kW
- HAAT: 310.7 m (1,019 ft)
- Transmitter coordinates: 39°24′12″N 86°8′50″W

Links
- Public license information: Public file; LMS
- Website: iontelevision.com

WIPX-TV (channel 63) is a television station licensed to Bloomington, Indiana, United States, serving the Indianapolis area as an affiliate of Ion Television. It is owned by Inyo Broadcast Holdings alongside Bounce TV affiliate WCLJ-TV (channel 42, also licensed to Bloomington). WIPX-TV and WCLJ-TV share offices on Production Drive (near I-465) in southwestern Indianapolis; through a channel sharing agreement, the two stations transmit using WIPX-TV's spectrum from an antenna on SR 252 in Trafalgar, Indiana.

Channel 63 went on air at the end of 1988 as WIIB, owned by Sinclair Broadcast Group and broadcasting Home Shopping Network programming. It dropped HSN for Infomall TV (inTV) at the start of 1996. Sinclair sold controlling interest to a related entity in 1996; the station was then sold to an affiliate of Paxson Communications Corporation in 1998, coinciding with the launch of the Pax network, forerunner to Ion. Inyo Broadcast Holdings acquired WIPX-TV and WCLJ-TV in 2020 as part of the acquisition of Ion by the E. W. Scripps Company.

== History ==
In 1983, the Federal Communications Commission (FCC) designated three applications seeking channel 63 for hearing, from Channel 63, Inc. (what is now Sinclair Broadcast Group); Hoosier Tele-Media; and Channel 63 Limited, later Bloomington 63 Limited. Hoosier Tele-Media, whose owners included the manager of Bloomington radio station WBWB, withdrew when it became clear that the connection to the radio station would hurt it in the comparative hearing process. An administrative law judge's initial decision, released in September 1984, found in favor of Bloomington 63 because it did not own other broadcast properties. Sinclair appealed the decision to the FCC review board, which then overturned a settlement agreement and granted it the construction permit because of what one board member called "the watermarks of a visible pattern" in obtaining settlements in TV license cases on behalf of one of the company's principals.

Little progress was made on the station in the next three years; it was not until June 1988 that a permit to build the tower came before Johnson County zoning board members. By that time, Sinclair opted to affiliate WIIB with the Home Shopping Network (HSN) instead of assembling a general-entertainment independent lineup. It did so because of two events affecting the Indianapolis independents: the 1987 bankruptcy of Bloomington's WTTV and the sale at a low price of WXIN in Indianapolis. The station went on the air December 27, 1988, with HSN programming. Its non-home shopping programming was extremely limited, including public affairs shows produced by Indiana University.

On January 1, 1996, WIIB changed to the Infomall TV (inTV) infomercial service; the general manager had come away from an HSN affiliates conference believing that Barry Diller was about to convert HSN to a cable-only service. That same year, it acquired River City Broadcasting, owner of WTTV. As Federal Communications Commission (FCC) regulations at that time forbade the common ownership of two full-power commercial television stations in the same market, and after originally announcing their plans to sell channel 63, the Smith brothers changed their ownership interests in WIIB to non-attributable status and sold controlling interest to David C. McCarus.

WIIB joined the Pax network, forerunner of Ion, upon its launch on August 31, 1998. Channel 63, Inc., then sold the station for $35 million to RDP Communications (also known as DP Media), a company controlled by other members of the Paxson family. DP Media's six stations were absorbed by Paxson Communications Corporation in 2000, though Paxson had already been brokering their airtime to run Pax programming.

In January 2001, in conjunction with a joint sales agreement that Paxson had signed with NBC affiliate WTHR (channel 13), WIPX-TV began airing rebroadcasts of that station's 6 and 11 p.m. newscasts on an hour tape delay on weeknights. WTHR's sales department also began selling WIPX-TV's advertising inventory. By this time, a translator, WIPX-LP (channel 51), had been established in Indianapolis to improve the station's signal; the station remained associated with WIPX-TV until it was donated to Word of God Fellowship, parent company of the Daystar Television Network, in 2014.

WIPX and WCLJ were included among Ion Media stations spun off to Inyo Broadcast Holdings in 2020, as the E. W. Scripps Company could not own those stations and WRTV. Scripps announced its repurchase of all Inyo stations on February 26, 2026.

== Technical information ==
=== Subchannels ===
Subchannels of WIPX-TV and WCLJ-TV
License	Subchannel	Res.	Short name	Programming
WIPX-TV	63.1	720p	ION	Ion Television
WIPX-TV	63.2	480i	CourtTV	Court TV
WIPX-TV	63.3	480i	BUSTED	Busted
WIPX-TV	63.4	480i	Mystery	Ion Mystery
WIPX-TV	63.5	480i	IONPlus	Ion Plus
WIPX-TV	63.6	480i	GameSho	Game Show Central
WIPX-TV	63.8	480i	QVC2	QVC2
WCLJ-TV	42.1	720p	Bounce	Bounce TV

=== Analog-to-digital conversion ===
WIPX-TV shut down its analog signal, over UHF channel 63, on June 12, 2009, the official date on which full-power television stations in the United States transitioned from analog to digital broadcasts under federal mandate. The station's digital signal continued to broadcast on its pre-transition UHF channel 27, using virtual channel 63. WIPX–WCLJ relocated its signal from channel 27 to channel 28 on October 18, 2019, as a result of the 2016 United States wireless spectrum auction.
