= WTVY (TV) =

Television station in Dothan, Alabama

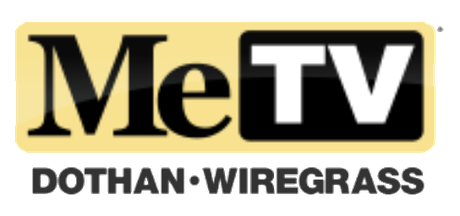
- Dothan, Alabama; United States
- Channels: Digital: 36 (UHF); Virtual: 4
- Branding: News 4; My 4; MeTV Dothan–Wiregrass (4.2); Dothan's CW (4.3); WRGX (4.4)

Programming
- Affiliations: 4.1: CBS; 4.2: MyNetworkTV/MeTV; 4.3: CW+; 4.4: NBC; for others, see § Subchannels

Ownership
- Owner: Gray Media; (Gray Television Licensee, LLC)
- Sister stations: WRGX-LD

History
- First air date: February 12, 1955
- Former channel number: Analog: 9 (VHF, 1955–1960), 4 (VHF, 1960–2009)
- Former affiliations: ABC (secondary, 1955–1970); NTA (secondary, 1956–1961); UPN (4.2, 2005–2006)
- Call sign meaning: "Television for You"

Technical information
- Licensing authority: FCC
- Facility ID: 4152
- ERP: 1,000 kW
- HAAT: 564.3 m (1,851 ft)
- Transmitter coordinates: 30°55′11″N 85°44′30″W

Links
- Public license information: Public file; LMS
- Website: www.wtvy.com

WTVY (channel 4) is a television station in Dothan, Alabama, United States, affiliated with CBS and MyNetworkTV. It is owned by Gray Media alongside low-power NBC/CW+/Telemundo affiliate WRGX-LD (channel 23). The two stations share studios on North Foster Street in downtown Dothan; WTVY's transmitter is located in Bethlehem, Florida (in the Panama City market).

WTVY is used to provide full-market over-the-air coverage of WRGX-LD1 (simulcast over WTVY-DT4) and WRGX-LD2 (simulcast over WTVY-DT3); however, these simulcasts are not presently in high definition.

== History ==
WTVY launched on February 12, 1955, originally broadcasting on channel 9, as a CBS affiliate. It was signed on by Charles Woods and a local group of investors. During the late-1950s, the station was also briefly affiliated with the NTA Film Network. WTVY was a secondary ABC affiliate until WDHN signed on in 1970. In a massive reallocation of signals in Alabama and Georgia mandated by the Federal Communications Commission (FCC) to minimize signal interference, the station moved to channel 4 on November 2, 1960.

At the time of the reallocation, WTVY also moved to new studios with a 1,209-foot (369 m) tower in Webb, five miles (8 km) east of Dothan. At the time, the tower was the tallest structure in the state of Alabama. WTVY-FM still utilizes the tower to transmit its signal. In 1966, the station began to broadcast in color with two color cameras bought from WDSU in New Orleans. Woods bought out his partners in 1973 and started building a sizeable smaller market TV station group with WTVY as the flagship station. On July 31, 1975, WTVY became one of the first stations in the country to broadcast 24 hours a day.

In 1978, WTVY moved to its current 1,847-foot (563 m) (height above ground) tower in Bethlehem (28 miles (45 km) southwest of Dothan). The tower is the tallest structure in the state of Florida. The tower is so tall that on clear nights the strobe warning lights on the tower have been seen as far as 50 miles (80 km) away in certain locations. The move was made in part to improve its signal in Panama City and along the Florida Gulf Coast, where it had been the default CBS affiliate since 1961.

The new tower gave WTVY one of the largest coverage areas in the Southeastern United States. It provides at least grade B coverage as far west as the Florida side of the Mobile–Pensacola market (including Fort Walton Beach and Destin) and as far northwest as the fringes of the Montgomery market.

In 1993, WTVY moved its studios to the historic Houston Hotel building in downtown Dothan (now known as the Woods Building) and operates on the first two floors. The news studio is actually located in what used to be the grand ballroom of the hotel. The building is tall enough (eight stories) that the station's studio-to-transmitter microwave dish is located on top of the building, not requiring a smaller tower to be built on the property.

In the same year, shortly after the station moved to the Woods Building, Charles Woods encountered financial difficulties, and he sold his remaining broadcast properties. Ownership of WTVY was transferred to Chemical Bank and operated under the corporate name of Dothan Holdings, LLC, and Woods's other stations went to Banam Broadcasting, a subsidiary of BankAmerica. Charles Woods's son, David, continued to own WDFX-TV in Dothan and WCOV-TV in Montgomery via his company Woods Communications Corporation. Benedek Broadcasting bought WTVY from Chemical Bank/Dothan Holdings in 1995 for a price of $28 million. In 2002, Benedek announced that it would exit broadcasting and sell its television stations, including WTVY, to Gray Television.

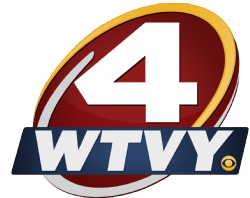
Previous logo from 2015 until April 2021.

For much of its history, WTVY doubled as the CBS affiliate for the Panama City market. Since Gray bought the station in 2002, WTVY has been a sister station to Panama City's NBC affiliate, WJHG-TV. WTVY's transmitter is technically located in the Panama City market even though it is only 28 miles (45 km) from Dothan. In exchange, WJHG had long been available in Dothan on cable since the area did not have its own NBC affiliate. This status ended on September 24, 2012, when Gray launched WECP-LD as a Panama City-based CBS affiliate. However, most cable systems in that market continued to carry WTVY in lieu of WECP until October when the latter replaced WTVY on area systems. Gray likewise launched WRGX-LD as a Dothan-based NBC affiliate on June 1, 2013, replacing WJHG and Montgomery's WSFA on area cable systems.

== Programming ==
When Panama City relied on WTVY for a CBS station, all syndicated programming that was duplicated on WJHG and ABC outlet WMBB was still shown on WTVY on Panama City's cable systems. This is in contrast to SyndEx laws which gives local stations the option to restrict importing of syndicated programming that is already available on an in-market station. After WECP replaced WTVY, the former station is able to air shows that WJHG cannot and does not have to rely on an out-of-market station to fill an affiliation slot.

=== News operation ===
WTVY has historically been a ratings powerhouse in the Wiregrass Region winning every time slot. This is partly because its only local competition, ABC affiliate WDHN, has a coverage area only half as large. WDFX-TV, the local Fox affiliate, discontinued its 9 p.m. newscast (initially produced by WSFA in Montgomery and later by WDHN) on June 1, 2025.

On weekdays, WTVY produces two thirty-minute newscasts (at 4 and 5:30 p.m.) that are exclusive to WRGX. As a result, the NBC station airs NBC Nightly News on tape delay at 6 p.m. unlike most NBC outlets in the Central Time Zone. The WRGX news programs broadcast from a secondary set at the North Foster Street facility. Although it features additional reporters from WTVY, the NBC station maintains separate news anchors and a meteorologist. It does not simulcast any newscasts from WTVY.

Since WJHG and WTVY had traditionally been available on cable in both Dothan and Panama City, and since both stations have the same ownership, WJHG has run WTVY stories that take place in those parts of northwestern Florida that are in northern part of the Panama City market. Meanwhile, WTVY has run WJHG stories focusing on Panama City and the coast. Sometimes, WTVY will run its own stories on Panama City that WJHG did not cover.

The building that WTVY broadcasts from in Downtown Dothan also has a Doppler weather radar dome that is specifically made for the station. On June 4, 2012, WTVY became the first station in the Dothan market to broadcast local newscasts in high definition. One notable former personality of WTVY is Mitch English who was a weather anchor and news reporter at the station. He was a co-host of the nationally syndicated weekday morning show, The Daily Buzz, from 2002 until 2012.

== Subchannels ==
The station's signal is multiplexed:

Subchannels of WTVY
Channel	Res.	Short name	Programming
4.1	1080i	WTVY-DT	CBS
4.2	480i	WTVY-MY	MyNetworkTV & MeTV
4.3	480i	WTVY-CW	The CW Plus (WRGX-LD2) in SD
4.4	480i	WRGXNBC	NBC (WRGX-LD) in SD
4.5	480i	WTVYPSN	Peachtree Sports Network
4.6	480i	IonPlus	Ion Plus
4.7	480i	WTVY365	365BLK

Simulcast of subchannels of another station

== See also ==
- Channel 4 virtual TV stations in the United States
- Channel 10 branded TV stations in the United States
- Channel 36 digital TV stations in the United States
