= WRGX-LD =

Television station in Dothan, Alabama

- Dothan, Alabama; United States
- Channels: Digital: 23 (UHF); Virtual: 23
- Branding: WRGX; Dothan's CW (23.2); Telemundo Dothan (23.3)

Programming
- Affiliations: 23.1: NBC; 23.2: CW+; 23.3: Telemundo

Ownership
- Owner: Gray Media; (Gray Television Licensee, LLC)
- Sister stations: WTVY

History
- First air date: May 2, 1990 (original incarnation); June 1, 2013 (current incarnation)
- Last air date: January 21, 2011 (original incarnation)
- Former call signs: W29BB (1990–1992); W41BN (1992–2011); WDON-LP (2011–2013)
- Former channel number: Analog: 29 (UHF, 1990–1992), 41 (UHF, 1992–2011)
- Former affiliations: TBN (1990–2011)
- Call sign meaning: across (represented by "X") the Wiregrass (service area)

Technical information
- Licensing authority: FCC
- Facility ID: 191163
- Class: LD
- ERP: 15 kW
- HAAT: 481 m (1,578 ft)
- Transmitter coordinates: 30°55′11″N 85°44′30″W
- Translator(s): WTVY 4.4/4.3 Dothan

Links
- Public license information: LMS
- Website: www.wtvy.com; "Dothan's CW" (LD2)

WRGX-LD (channel 23) is a low-power television station in Dothan, Alabama, United States, affiliated with NBC, The CW Plus, and Telemundo. It is owned by Gray Media alongside CBS/MyNetworkTV affiliate WTVY (channel 4). The two stations share studios on North Foster Street in Downtown Dothan; WRGX-LD's transmitter is located in Bethlehem, Florida (in the Panama City market).

In order to increase its over-the-air reach, the station's NBC and CW+ programming is simulcast in 16:9 widescreen standard definition on WTVY's respective fourth and third digital subchannels. These full-market feeds can be seen on channels 4.4/4.3 from the same Bethlehem tower.

== History ==
The station originally signed on as a Trinity Broadcasting Network-operated translator as W29BB on channel 29 in 1990; it was relocated to channel 41 and changed its call sign to W41BN in 1992. The station was sold through a donation to the Minority Media and Telecommunications Council on November 30, 2010. On June 28, 2011, New Moon Communications acquired the station from the MMTC in a group deal with three other low-power stations in Jackson, Tennessee; Jonesboro, Arkansas; and Ottumwa, Iowa, for $12,004.

Concurrent with the purchase, New Moon signed an affiliation agreement with NBC for WDON and the three other stations, all of which were located in markets where the network was exclusively available through cable and satellite or through rimshot signal coverage from over-the-air affiliates in nearby markets. The call sign of the station was changed to WDON-LP on June 14, 2011.

On January 3, 2013, New Moon Communications announced it was selling WDON-LP to Gray Television for $60,000. Gray changed the call letters to WRGX-LD on April 13, 2013. It became the NBC affiliate for the Dothan area when the station signed on-the-air on June 1, 2013.

It is the first NBC affiliate that is licensed to the immediate Dothan market. The area had been one of the last markets in the United States without full service from the big three networks. Previously, Montgomery's WSFA and Panama City's WJHG (both of which are a sister station to WRGX) provided decent signal coverage to some portion of the market.

WSFA had rimshot coverage and WJHG provided grade B signal service in Dothan proper and both had cable and satellite coverage across much of the market. With the station's relaunch as an NBC affiliate, WRGX took the place of both stations on many cable and satellite providers as the market's main source for NBC programming. Although cable and satellite providers are not normally required to carry low-power stations, Gray has the right to require area providers to carry WRGX as part of the retransmission consent compensation for carrying WTVY.

The station's launch effectively gave Dothan in-market affiliates of all six major commercial broadcast networks for the first time ever; these other affiliations are held by sister station WTVY (which in addition to being the CBS affiliate also holds affiliations with MyNetworkTV and MeTV). The area's other two network affiliates are Fox station WDFX-TV and ABC affiliate WDHN.

== News operation ==
On weekdays, WTVY produces two thirty-minute newscasts (at 4 and 5:30 p.m.) that are exclusive to WRGX. As a result, this station airs an alternate live feed of NBC Nightly News at 6 p.m. (rather than 5:30 p.m. as with most NBC outlets in the Central Time Zone).

The WRGX news programs broadcast from a secondary set at the North Foster Street facility. Although it features additional reporters from WTVY, this station maintains separate news anchors and a meteorologist. It does not simulcast any newscasts from WTVY.

== Subchannels ==
The station's signal is multiplexed:

Subchannels of WRGX-LD
Channel	Res.	Short name	Programming
23.1	1080i	WRGX-DT	NBC
23.2	720p	WRGX-CW	The CW Plus
23.3	480i		Telemundo
