= WECP-LD =

Television station in Panama City, Florida

- Panama City, Florida; United States
- Channels: Digital: 35 (UHF); Virtual: 21
- Branding: WECP-TV; My 7 (LD2)

Programming
- Affiliations: 21.1: CBS; 21.2: Independent with MyNetworkTV; for others, see § Subchannels

Ownership
- Owner: Gray Media; (Gray Television Licensee, LLC)
- Sister stations: WJHG-TV

History
- Founded: February 25, 2010
- First air date: September 24, 2012
- Former call signs: W18DR-D (2010–2012)
- Former channel numbers: Digital: 18 (UHF, 2012–2015), 29 (UHF, 2015–2019); Virtual: 18 (2012–2021)
- Call sign meaning: "ECP" is IATA code for Panama City airport

Technical information
- Licensing authority: FCC
- Facility ID: 182840
- Class: LD
- ERP: 15 kW
- HAAT: 330 m (1,083 ft)
- Transmitter coordinates: 30°21′8″N 85°23′28″W
- Translator(s): WJHG-TV 7.3 Panama City

Links
- Public license information: LMS

WECP-LD (channel 21) is a low-power television station in Panama City, Florida, United States, affiliated with CBS, MyNetworkTV, and Telemundo. It is owned by Gray Media alongside NBC affiliate WJHG-TV (channel 7). The two stations share studios on Front Beach Road/SR 30 in Panama City Beach; WECP-LD's transmitter is located on SR 20 in unincorporated Youngstown, Florida.

Due to its low-power status, WECP's broadcast range is effectively limited to Panama City and surrounding areas in Bay County. In order to expand its off-air broadcasting reach, it is simulcast in 16:9 widescreen standard definition on WJHG-TV's third digital subchannel (7.3) from the same transmitter site.

== History ==
On April 20, 2012, then owner MIK LLC announced it was selling the construction permit for the station (which initially held the call sign W18DR-D) to Gray Television. Under the transfer, MIK would receive $4,000 and would turn over the permit to DTV America Corporation which would, in turn, transfer it to Gray. Gray exercised a purchase option that was part of the deal to acquire the station outright on May 11, 2012. Gray changed the calls to WECP-LD on June 4, 2012.

On July 17, 2012, Gray Television signed an affiliation agreement with CBS for WECP-LD and two other low-powered stations: WSVF-LD in Harrisonburg, Virginia, and WIYE-LP in Parkersburg, West Virginia. As a result, WECP-LD became the CBS affiliate for the Panama City area when the station took to the air on September 24, 2012.

It is the second CBS affiliate that is licensed to the immediate Panama City market. WJHG-TV had previously carried a secondary affiliation with the network from its December 1953 sign-on until 1961. Since then, sister station WTVY in Dothan, Alabama, had served as the default CBS affiliate for Panama City; WTVY's tower is located in Bethlehem, Florida, in the Panama City market. In October 2012, WTVY was removed from cable systems in the market with WECP taking its place.

On January 7, 2014, WECP applied to the Federal Communications Commission (FCC) to move from channel 18 to channel 29. The reasoning was WJHG had a construction permit to relocate to channel 18. The application was approved on November 14, 2014, giving WECP its construction permit. The switch of WECP to channel 29 (retaining 18 as virtual) and WJHG to channel 18 (virtual 7) took place on May 21, 2015, with the FCC issuing the station's license on June 5, 2015. WECP moved to RF channel 35 on August 21, 2019, as a result of the spectrum auction and to offset interference issues with adjacent stations.

Gray twice acquired other companies that owned Panama City-area television stations, selling them off to retain WJHG-TV and WECP-LD. In 2014, it acquired most of Hoak Media, owner of ABC affiliate WMBB; that station was spun off to Nexstar Broadcasting Group. When Gray acquired Raycom Media in 2019, it spun off Fox affiliate WPGX (channel 28) to Lockwood Broadcast Group.

On March 2, 2021, WECP transferred from channel 18 to channel 21.

== News operation ==
WJHG presently produces an hour of locally produced newscasts each weekday (at noon and 5:30 p.m.) for WECP-LD. As a result, the station airs the CBS Evening News via an additional live feed at 6 p.m. unlike most CBS outlets in the Central Time Zone. WECP-LD does not air newscasts on weekends, opting for syndicated programming. It has a dedicated anchor and meteorologist for the two programs but the personalities can also contribute to WJHG.

== Subchannels ==
The station's signal is multiplexed:

Subchannels of WECP-LD
| Subchannel | Res. | Short name | Programming |
|---|---|---|---|
| 21.1 | 1080i | WECP-DT | CBS |
| 21.2 | 480i | WECP-DT | Independent with MyNetworkTV (4:3) |
| 21.3 | 480i | WECP-DT | Outlaw |
| 21.4 | 480i | WECP-DT | Heroes & Icons (4:3) |
| 21.5 | | | Telemundo |
