= TrueReal =

American digital multicast TV network

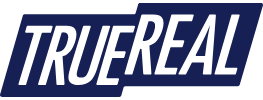
- Type: Digital multicast television network
- Country: United States
- Headquarters: Atlanta, Georgia

Programming
- Picture format: 1080p (HDTV); 480i (SDTV)

Ownership
- Owner: E. W. Scripps Company
- Parent: Scripps Networks, LLC

History
- Launched: July 1, 2021
- Closed: March 27, 2023 (1 year, 8 months and 26 days)

TrueReal was an American digital multicast television network owned by the Katz Broadcasting subsidiary of the E. W. Scripps Company, targeting women aged 25–54.

TrueReal and Defy TV, a complementary network targeted at men aged 25–54, launched together on July 1, 2021, with broadcast coverage of 92% of the United States. On March 27, 2023, TrueReal's schedule was merged with Defy and its channel space was reused to carry programming from Jewelry Television.

== History ==
On March 2, 2021, Scripps announced that it would launch two new multicast networks—Defy and TrueReal—in the wake of its acquisition of Ion Media and additional television transmitters across the United States. The channels are part of Scripps's strategy to increase penetration among cord cutters that do not have traditional pay-TV packages. The tentative name for the network before launch was Doozy, but the name was later changed to TrueReal, clarifying the network's content.

The services launched on July 1 with 92% national coverage, mostly through Ion Television affiliated stations, but also on subchannels of some Scripps-owned local TV stations and by agreement with other station groups.

On March 10, 2023, Scripps announced that TrueReal would shut down on March 27, merging its programming with that of the Defy TV channel. After its closure, Scripps began leasing the open spectrum it created on its owned and operated stations to Jewelry Television subchannel. Defy TV and its schedule would be wound down on June 30, 2024 to make way for a re-launch of Ion Plus over-the-air, with the A&E Network library moved to a new network, simply called Defy, under the management of Free TV Networks.

== Programming ==
TrueReal's schedule mainly included reality programs from the library of A&E Networks, including Storage Wars, Little Women: LA, Intervention, Hoarders, My Crazy Ex and Wahlburgers.
