= WMBB =

Television station in Panama City, Florida

- Panama City, Florida; United States
- Channels: Digital: 13 (VHF); Virtual: 13
- Branding: WMBB News 13; The CW Panama City (13.2)

Programming
- Affiliations: 13.1: ABC; 13.2: The CW Plus; for others, see § Subchannels

Ownership
- Owner: Nexstar Media Group; (Nexstar Media Inc.)

History
- First air date: October 4, 1973
- Former call signs: WDTB (1973-1977)
- Former channel numbers: Analog: 13 (VHF, 1973–2009); Digital: 19 (UHF, 2002–2009)
- Former affiliations: NBC (1973–1982)
- Call sign meaning: "World's Most Beautiful Beaches"

Technical information
- Licensing authority: FCC
- Facility ID: 66398
- ERP: 42 kW
- HAAT: 434 m (1,424 ft)
- Transmitter coordinates: 30°21′8″N 85°23′28″W

Links
- Public license information: Public file; LMS
- Website: www.mypanhandle.com

WMBB (channel 13) is a television station in Panama City, Florida, United States, affiliated with ABC. Its second digital subchannel serves as an owned-and-operated station of The CW (via The CW Plus). Owned by Nexstar Media Group, the station maintains studios on Harrison Avenue/US 231 in downtown Panama City, and its transmitter is located in unincorporated Youngstown along the Bay–Calhoun county line.

== History ==
Channel 13 first began broadcast operations on October 4, 1973, as WDTB. The station was started by Panhandle Broadcasting Corporation (run by attorney Denver T. Brannen, from where the original call letters were derived from), financed by local businessman/car dealer Tommy Thomas, and attorneys Julian Bennett and Dick Arnold. When it first took to the air, the station was originally an NBC affiliate. The station was a relatively late start for a VHF frequency; most of the allocations on that band elsewhere in the U.S. had been taken by that point. On April 18, 1977, WDTB was sold to Octagon Broadcasting, an Atlanta-based outfit. Upon the change, Octagon changed the station's call sign to the current WMBB (which stands for "The World's Most Beautiful Beaches").

Originally, the station was positioned to be the NBC affiliate for Tallahassee as well since the market did not have one until April 21, 1983, when WTWC-TV signed on. At the time, WMBB's transmitter was in Frink, Calhoun County, well over fifty miles (80 km) away from Tallahassee at approximately 30°22′9″N 85°12′29″W. In addition, many viewers in the capital city already received NBC from Albany, Georgia's WALB which provided a better signal to the area.

On January 4, 1982, WMBB became an ABC affiliate, swapping affiliations with crosstown rival WJHG, which had been the market's original NBC station prior to 1972. Then on December 5, 1986, Buford Television of Tyler, Texas, purchased the station and began investing in equipment and news talent in order to make the station more competitive, not only with WJHG, but also with Dothan, Alabama's WTVY, the CBS station serving the eastern part of the northwestern Florida Panhandle region. It was also around this time that this station moved from its location in Downtown Panama City to its current location on Harrison Avenue that formerly housed a Buick dealership. The new facilities offered three times the space of the previous location.

At 2:03 p.m. Central Time on May 18, 1989, an Air Force F-15 fighter jet clipped a wire at WMBB's Frink tower. This caused the tower, antenna, and transmitter to be completely destroyed. Not long after this incident, channel 13 was sold once again. This time, it joined Spartan Communications of Spartanburg, South Carolina, as the construction of new transmission equipment got underway. The company completed the acquisition on April 12, 1990. On August 6 of that same year, WMBB began broadcasting from a new 1,500-foot (457 m) state-of-the-art antenna and transmitter tower now in Youngstown. This allowed for better viewing of the station in the western half of the market including the rapidly growing southern Walton County area and Destin.

In 1993, WMBB was one of several ABC affiliates that refused to clear the police procedural drama NYPD Blue, carrying syndicated sitcoms instead under the orders of the station's general manager, Hugh Roche, over indecency concerns. It only picked up the program at the start of 1997, when the TV Parental Guidelines came into force, along with the v-chip. Other than WLOX in Biloxi, Mississippi, which never carried the series, WMBB was the last ABC station to hold off on carrying the show.

In March 2000, WMBB became one of 13 stations in a package acquired by Media General worth $605 million. Later that year, Media General purchased the Jackson County Floridan newspaper. WMBB then established a Jackson County Bureau and used the resources of the Floridan to cover Jackson County as well. This caught the eye of the Federal Communications Commission (FCC) because of the common ownership of a newspaper and television station in the same market. With the sale of WMBB to Hoak Media, the issue became moot. By the time Media General sold the station, Media General was granted a permanent waiver by the FCC to operate both properties in the same market. Media General later divested all of their newspapers (with the exception of the Tampa Tribune) to Warren Buffett's World Media Holdings in June 2012.

On March 14, 2008, it was announced that Media General would sell the station (and then-sister KALB-TV in Alexandria, Louisiana) to Hoak Media. The deal was closed on July 16. At the time of the closing, WMBB was Hoak's only television station east of the Mississippi River. In July 2010, the station replaced its second digital subchannel broadcast of weather radar with This TV. That network originally aired on WBIF after that channel stopped airing content from the Retro Television Network (RTV). Its replacement was supposed to be WPGX-DT2 but this never made it to air.

On November 20, 2013, Hoak announced the sale of most of its stations, including WMBB, to Gray Television. Due to Gray's existing ownership of WJHG-TV and WECP-LD, Gray immediately placed the station, along with KREX-TV in Grand Junction, Colorado, up for sale to comply with FCC regulations. On December 19, Gray announced that the overlap properties, including WMBB, would be sold to Nexstar Broadcasting Group, for $37.5 million. The sale was completed on June 13, 2014. The deal made WMBB a sister station to Dothan's ABC affiliate, WDHN. On January 17, 2017, Nexstar completed its purchase of Media General, which reunited WMBB with most of its former Media General sister stations.

The station was knocked off the air on October 10, 2018, by Hurricane Michael.

== News operation ==
WMBB made history during Hurricane Dennis in July 2005 when it became the first station in Panama City to broadcast live storm coverage over the internet. It was one of the first stations in the country to use Weather Services International's Titan forecasting tool (a 3D forecasting system which showed the collapse of the storm just before it struck Santa Rosa Island).

On July 21, 2011, WMBB announced on its Facebook page that it would add another newscast starting September 12, News 13 Midday, that runs from 11 a.m. until noon each weekday. This is actually a return to doing a news program during the midday time slot since the station used to produce a midday program until the late-1990s.

In February 2016, Tom Lewis returned to WMBB to become its news director. He was the primary anchor from the late 1980s until 2001, and left for rival station WJHG to become its primary anchor until 2014. He also served as its news director from 2005 to 2010.

On June 1, 2020, WMBB began producing an hour-long 9 p.m. weeknight newscast for Fox affiliate WPGX. The newscast ended on June 1, 2025.

== Technical information ==
=== Subchannels ===
The station's signal is multiplexed:

Subchannels of WMBB
Channel	Res.	Short name	Programming
13.1	720p	WMBB-DT	ABC
13.2	480i	CW Plus	The CW Plus
13.3	480i	Laff	Laff
13.4	480i	MYSTERY	Ion Mystery

=== Analog-to-digital conversion ===
WMBB shut down its analog signal, over VHF channel 13, on June 12, 2009, the official date on which full-power television stations in the United States transitioned from analog to digital broadcasts under federal mandate. The station's digital signal relocated from its pre-transition UHF channel 19 to VHF channel 13.
