= Blue Stream (disambiguation) =

Blue Stream is a major gas pipeline crossing the Black Sea.

Blue Stream may also refer to:

- Blue Stream (company) a local cable television and Internet provider in Florida
- Blue Stream II, proposed pipeline, abandoned in 2014

== See also ==
- The Blue Stream, book
