= WJHG-TV =

Television station in Panama City, Florida

- Panama City, Florida; United States
- Channels: Digital: 16 (UHF); Virtual: 7
- Branding: NewsChannel 7

Programming
- Affiliations: 7.1: NBC; 7.3: CBS; for others, see § Subchannels

Ownership
- Owner: Gray Media; (Gray Television Licensee, LLC)
- Sister stations: WECP-LD

History
- First air date: December 1, 1953
- Former call signs: WJDM-TV (1953–1960)
- Former channel numbers: Analog: 7 (VHF, 1953–2009); Digital: 8 (VHF, 2004–2009), 7 (VHF, 2009–2015), 18 (UHF, 2015–2019)
- Former affiliations: Independent (1953); NBC (1953–1972); DuMont (secondary, 1953–1955); CBS (secondary, 1953–1961); ABC (secondary 1953–1972, primary 1972–1982); UPN (secondary, 1998–2006); The CW Plus (DT2, 2006–2023)
- Call sign meaning: James Harrison Gray, the founder of Gray Media

Technical information
- Licensing authority: FCC
- Facility ID: 73136
- ERP: 1,000 kW
- HAAT: 410.9 m (1,348 ft)
- Transmitter coordinates: 30°21′8″N 85°23′28″W

Links
- Public license information: Public file; LMS
- Website: www.wjhg.com

WJHG-TV (channel 7) is a television station in Panama City, Florida, United States, affiliated with NBC. It is owned by Gray Media alongside low-power CBS/MyNetworkTV/Telemundo affiliate WECP-LD (channel 21). The two stations share studios on Front Beach Road/SR 30 in Panama City Beach; WJHG-TV's transmitter is located on SR 20 in unincorporated Youngstown, Florida.

== History ==
WJHG went on the air December 1, 1953, as WJDM-TV; it was owned by local businessman J. D. Manley. The station became known by many people as "Wait Just a Darn Minute" (a play on its call letters) because it would frequently go off the air with technical problems.

At first, WJDM-TV aired local programming such as church services and wrestling and operated as an independent station before securing a primary affiliation with NBC and secondary affiliations with CBS and ABC. Mel Wheeler purchased the station in 1957, and in 1960, James Harrison Gray, the founder of Gray Communications bought the station and changed the call letters to WJHG-TV after his initials. It was the second television station in Gray's portfolio, after WALB-TV in Albany, Georgia.

WJHG dropped CBS in the 1960s after WTVY in Dothan, Alabama, became the default CBS affiliate for Panama City as well. That station's transmitter (in Bethlehem, Florida) is technically located in the Panama City media market, even though its primary coverage area is the Wiregrass Region of southeastern Alabama. On August 1, 1972, WJHG, along with then-sister station KTVE in El Dorado, Arkansas, switched its primary affiliation to ABC, leaving the area without a primary NBC affiliate until WDTB (now WMBB) began in 1973 as the NBC affiliate. In 1982, WMBB and WJHG switched networks; WJHG returned to NBC.

In 1998, WJHG was almost sold when the Phipps family sold WCTV in Tallahassee to Gray Communications. Gray would have been forced to seek a waiver from the Federal Communications Commission (FCC) to keep both WJHG and WCTV under pre-1996 ownership rules because WJHG's grade B signal covers the extreme western parts of the Tallahassee market. The 1996 Telecommunications Act allowed for overlapping fringe signals, so Gray was able to keep both stations. Instead, Gray ended up selling its then-flagship station, WALB-TV in Albany, Georgia, because its city-grade signal overlapped that of WCTV's in the southwestern Georgia portion of the Tallahassee market. Even after the 1996 reforms, the FCC was not willing to even consider a waiver for a city-grade overlap. WJHG began airing UPN programming in the late hours on a secondary basis, after WPCT dropped the network in 2001. This would continue until UPN and The WB merged operations in 2006 to form The CW, despite Panama City once again gaining its own UPN station when WBIF switched to UPN from Pax in 2004.

In 2002, Gray bought most of Benedek Broadcasting's stations. This included WTVY, whose transmitter provides a signal that covers all the way from Fort Walton Beach, Florida, to Troy, Alabama. By this time, signal contours were no longer an issue and Gray could keep both stations. Since both stations had traditionally been available on cable in both the Dothan and Panama City area, and have the same ownership, WJHG has run WTVY stories that take place in those parts of northwestern Florida that are in northern part of the Panama City market. Meanwhile, WTVY has run WJHG stories focusing on Panama City and the coast. Sometimes, WTVY will run its own stories on Panama City but WJHG did not cover Dothan at all (Southeastern Alabama's default NBC affiliate was WSFA from Montgomery). Gray launched low-powered WRGX-LD as a Dothan-based NBC affiliate on June 1, 2013, ending WJHG's availability in the Dothan market.

Gray twice acquired other companies that owned Panama City-area television stations, selling them off to retain WJHG-TV and WECP-LD. In 2014, it acquired most of Hoak Media, owner of ABC affiliate WMBB; that station was spun off to Nexstar Broadcasting Group. When Gray acquired Raycom Media in 2019, it spun off Fox affiliate WPGX (channel 28) to Lockwood Broadcast Group.

=== Circle 7 logo ===
Logo used between 2001 and 2018; the "circle 7" dates from 1994.

The station used a "Circle 7" logo as far back as the 1950s without objection from ABC, pre-dating the introduction of the now-common variation to its owned stations in 1962. At some point, however, the network trademarked said logo for exclusive use by its owned-and-operated stations that shared the channel 7 dial position in several major television markets across the nation, with some channel 7 ABC affiliates also directly licensing the logo. In 1982, when Gray Communications switched WJHG's network affiliation to NBC, ABC ordered WJHG to cease using the logo. Station manager Ray H. Holloway produced archival film and still photographs that showed the local station had been using the "Circle 7" logo longer than the network.

To bring the matter to a satisfactory conclusion, the station elected to modify the logo. The modification was minor (the bottom of the circle was left open) but enough to pacify the network's executives, who were upset over the station's decision to "defect" to NBC. However, there are non-ABC stations still using designs similar to the Circle 7 logo including two of Sunbeam Television's stations, independent station WHDH in Boston and Fox affiliate WSVN in Miami.

On June 6, 2018, WJHG-TV underwent its most significant logo change yet, finally dropping the "Circle 7" logo after almost four decades.

== News operation ==
WJHG presently broadcasts 32 7/8 hours of locally produced newscasts each week (with 5 1/4 hours each weekday, one hour on Saturdays and 1 7/8 hours on Sundays); in addition, the station produces five hours of newscasts for sister station WECP-LD (at noon and 5:30 p.m. each weekday). The combined news operation results in over 37 hours of newscasts each week.

On June 28, 2010, WJHG began broadcasting their newscasts in 16:9 enhanced definition widescreen.

=== Notable former on-air staff ===
- Kristen Berset – anchor/producer (now at WUSA in Washington, D.C.)
- Earl Hutto – news/sports anchor (1960s–70s; retired U.S. Congressman; deceased)
- Shepard Smith – anchor/reporter (later at Fox News, now at CNBC)
- David Steele – sports anchor (mid 1970s; now with Bally Sports Sun and the NBA's Orlando Magic)

== Technical information ==
=== Subchannels ===
The station's signal is multiplexed:

Subchannels of WJHG-TV
Subchannel	Res.	Short name	Programming
7.1	1080i	NBC	NBC
7.2	720p	MeTV	MeTV
7.3	480i	CBS SD	CBS (WECP-LD) in SD
7.4	480i	ION	Ion
7.5	480i	DABL	Dabl
7.6	480i	the365	365BLK
7.7	480i	COZI	Cozi TV

Simulcast of subchannels of another station

=== Analog-to-digital conversion ===
WJHG-TV shut down its analog signal, over VHF channel 7, on February 17, 2009, the original target date on which full-power television stations in the United States were to transition from analog to digital broadcasts under federal mandate (which was later pushed back to June 12, 2009). The station's digital signal relocated from its pre-transition VHF channel 8 to channel 7. On December 19, 2012, WJHG received a construction permit to move from VHF channel 7 to UHF channel 18 (previously occupied by Panama City sister station WECP). WJHG's move to digital channel 18 (retaining virtual 7) and WECP's to channel 29 (virtual 18) took place on May 21, 2015, with the FCC issuing the station's license on June 5, 2015.

Sometime in 2019, WJHG-TV changed frequencies from RF channel 18 to RF channel 16 as part of the FCC's spectrum repack.
