= Jim Spencer (businessman) =

- Occupation: media entrepreneur
- Known for: Founder of Newsy

Jim Spencer is a media entrepreneur. In 2008, he founded Newsy, a multi-source video news service that analyzes reports from international news sources and highlights the differences in reporting.

Newsy developed one of the first video news apps for the iPad, as well as publishing applications for iPhone, Android, and Windows Phone.
