= WDHN =

Television station in Dothan, Alabama

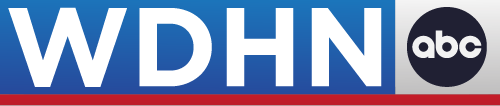
- Dothan, Alabama; United States
- Channels: Digital: 21 (UHF); Virtual: 18
- Branding: WDHN

Programming
- Affiliations: 18.1: ABC; for others, see § Subchannels

Ownership
- Owner: Nexstar Media Group; (Nexstar Media Inc.)

History
- First air date: August 7, 1970
- Former call signs: WDHN (1970–1979); WDHN-TV (1979–1998)
- Former channel numbers: Analog: 18 (UHF, 1970–2009)
- Call sign meaning: Dothan

Technical information
- Licensing authority: FCC
- Facility ID: 43846
- ERP: 1,000 kW
- HAAT: 190.4 m (625 ft)
- Transmitter coordinates: 31°14′25″N 85°18′43″W

Links
- Public license information: Public file; LMS
- Website: www.wdhn.com

WDHN (channel 18) is a television station in Dothan, Alabama, United States, affiliated with ABC and owned by Nexstar Media Group. The station's studios and transmitter are located on AL 52 in Webb.

== History ==
WDHN came on the air on August 7, 1970, as the area's second television station and first UHF station. It aired an analog signal on UHF channel 18. The station's launch was unexpectedly delayed by a strike at RCA which postponed delivery of their broadcast antenna by almost three months. Most of the staff had already been hired, which caused the station to incur significant financial losses before it even began broadcasting. WDHN was founded by Dothan businessman Betts Slingluff Jr. and a partnership of other local investors. Before that time, southeastern Alabama relied on WTVY to carry ABC programs on a secondary/delayed basis. WTVY was primarily a CBS affiliate, so conventional wisdom suggested that WDHN, as the second station in a small, two-station market, should have opted to affiliate with the NBC network rather than with ABC, because ABC was the smallest and weakest network and would not be anywhere near par with CBS and NBC in terms of ratings until later in the decade. However, geography played a decisive part in WDHN joining ABC. The Dothan media market received fairly strong signals from NBC stations WSFA in Montgomery and WJHG-TV in Panama City, Florida. At the time WDHN signed on, no primary ABC affiliate provided even a grade B signal to the Wiregrass Region.

WDHN struggled to operate profitably during its early years due to its status as a UHF station and weak over-the-air signal, low network compensation rate, and inferior programming compared to WTVY. The station also lost its ABC exclusivity in the Wiregrass area when WJHG-TV switched primary networks from NBC to ABC in 1972 (WJHG switched back to NBC in 1982). Consequently in 1979, Slingluff's group sold WDHN to Hi Ho Television, which also owned WVGA in Valdosta, Georgia. In 1986, Hi Ho sold WDHN and WVGA to Morris Multimedia. In 2003, Nexstar purchased WDHN, along with KARK-TV in Little Rock, Arkansas, from Morris.

As part of the DTV transition in 2009, WDHN turned off its analog transmitter and began broadcasting exclusively in digital.

On January 27, 2016, it was announced that Nexstar would buy Media General for $4.6 billion. WDHN, along with recently acquired Fox affiliate WZDX in Huntsville (which Nexstar would later sell in 2019 to Tegna in order to acquire Tribune Media, owner of WHNT-TV), became a part of "Nexstar Media Group" and joined a cluster of stations Nexstar would own in Alabama including WIAT in Birmingham and WKRG-TV in Mobile, as well as WRBL in Columbus, Georgia, which covers much of east Alabama including Opelika and Auburn. All three of these stations are CBS affiliates (WIAT was a longtime CBS affiliate until August 2026, now the station is a CW affiliate).

On June 15, 2016, Nexstar announced that it had entered into an affiliation agreement with Katz Broadcasting for the Escape (now Ion Mystery), Laff, Grit, and Bounce TV networks (the last one of which is owned by Bounce Media LLC, whose COO Jonathan Katz is president/CEO of Katz Broadcasting), bringing one or more of the four networks to 81 stations owned and/or operated by Nexstar, including WDHN (Bounce TV and Grit are already available in the area on digital subchannels of WDFX-TV).

On May 25, 2026, a tornado struck WDHN's studios, causing damage, but the station stayed on the air with Chief Meterologist Jordan Ambrose broadcasting emergency weather warnings to its viewers.

== News operation ==
WDHN produces 4 1/2 hours of news each weekday starting with Wake Up Wiregrass at 5 a.m., Daytime at 11 a.m., and then in the evening with WDHN News at 5, 6 and 10 p.m. Wake Up Wiregrass replaced Top of the Morning with Charlie Platt after its cancellation. The newscast airs weekday mornings from 5 to 7 a.m. (6 to 7 a.m. from relaunch until February 1, 2021).

Historically, WDHN has been a very distant second in the ratings behind WTVY. This is partly because for much of the analog era, WDHN only broadcast at 1.06 million watts, which was somewhat modest for a Big Four affiliate on the UHF band. It also had to deal with competition from WSFA, which was available on Wiregrass cable systems for decades. The over-the-air signal disadvantage was lessened somewhat in the 1980s and '90s by increased cable/satellite penetration and also later in the digital era as WDHN's digital signal operates at a full million watts, equivalent to five million watts in analog.

On December 19, 2017, WDHN unveiled a brand new set and began broadcasting local news in high definition.

On June 1, 2020, WDHN began producing an hour-long 9 p.m. newscast for Fox affiliate WDFX, replacing a prior arrangement where news was provided by WSFA out of Montgomery. The WDFX newscast ended on June 1, 2025.

On February 1, 2021, WDHN expanded morning news to two hours.

On February 15, 2021, WDHN added an 11 a.m. hour-long newscast with Michael Rinker as anchor. Katrice Nolan would join him a few months later as co-anchor.

On September 18, 2021, WDHN launched weekend newscasts at 6 p.m. and 10 p.m. on Saturdays and 5:30 p.m. and 10 p.m. on Sundays.

== Subchannels ==
The station's signal is multiplexed:

Subchannels of WDHN
Channel	Res.	Short name	Programming
18.1	720p	WDHN-DT	ABC
18.2	480i	Mystery	Ion Mystery
18.3	480i	Laff	Laff
18.4	480i	Antenna	Antenna TV
