= Digital multicast television network =

Type of television channel

A digital multicast television network, also known as a diginet or multichannel, is a type of national television service designed to be broadcast terrestrially as a supplementary service to other stations on their digital subchannels. Made possible by the conversion from analog to digital television broadcasting, which left room for additional services to be broadcast from an individual transmitter, regional and national broadcasters alike have introduced such channels since the 2000s. By March 2022, 54 such services existed in the United States.

Typically run on a lesser budget, national multicast services often rely on archive and imported content and are tailored to allow advertisers to reach specific demographics. Most of their revenue is derived from national advertising.

== Digital multicast services by country ==
=== Australia ===
The first multichannel broadcast in Australia was ABC Kids, which broadcast from 2001 to 2003; in the succeeding years, the country's commercial broadcasters also launched secondary services to compete against DVDs and online piracy. However, their ability to do so was hampered at first by a ban on adding channels, with a focus on such services as datacasting and high-definition. It was not until 2009 that commercial broadcasters were allowed to add multichannels; in that year, the three major networks all did so, bringing the number of channels they offered from three to eleven.

The original commercial multichannels were generalist in nature, which made it difficult for advertisers to target specific demographics and therefore made them less lucrative. The shift to specifically targeted services and their reliance on existing programming has allowed these channels to survive despite drawing comparatively low shares of the audience: in 2018, 7mate led the group with an audience share of 4.1 percent among metropolitan audiences. However, after the Australian Communications and Media Authority permitted the commercial broadcasters to move required children's programming and national drama commitments to their multichannels, ratings and visibility fell precipitously; by 2013, the ABC had more viewers for its kid-aimed channels than the commercial broadcasters combined. The commercial broadcasters also became more reliant on news, sport, and reality competitions on their main channels.

Each of the five major broadcasters offers its own package of multichannels:

- ABC: ABC Kids, ABC Entertains, ABC News, ABC Family
- SBS: SBS Food, SBS Viceland, SBS World Movies, SBS WorldWatch, National Indigenous Television (Natives only)
- Seven Network: 7two, 7mate, 7flix (films only), 7Bravo
- Nine Network: 9Go!, 9Gem, 9Life, 9Rush
- Network 10 (owned by Paramount Skydance): 10 Drama, 10 Comedy, Nickelodeon (youths only)

=== Mexico ===
In 2017, TV Azteca launched a+ (now A Más), initially conceived as a hybrid regional-national service to be carried on its existing Azteca 7 transmitters in most of Mexico. The new channel—as well as news channel adn40, aired on Azteca Uno transmitters, achieved sufficient national coverage to be classified a national network by the Federal Telecommunications Institute in December 2017, making it mandatory for satellite TV providers to add it to their lineups.

=== United States ===
For most of the 2000s decade, digital multicasting in the United States remained less used. One of the earliest successful uses of subchannels was to broadcast automated weather information. The first such subchannel was the 69 News Weather Channel, launched in February 2001 by WFMZ-TV in Allentown, Pennsylvania, with the assistance of AccuWeather. In 2004, NBC and its affiliates launched NBC Weather Plus, which was available in its peak from more than 80 stations nationally. Another early subchannel user was The Tube Music Network, which broadcast music videos from 2005 to 2007 until closing for financial reasons.

2008 was a critical year in the shift toward programmed digital multicast services. NBC Weather Plus was shut down at the end of 2008 in a decision taken by the network's affiliates. Several new channels offering classic TV programming were launching or growing at the time. These included the Retro Television Network (RTN), started in 2005 by Equity Media Holdings as the first such service, and This TV, a film-aimed service run as a joint venture between Weigel Broadcasting and film studio MGM (now owned by Amazon). Another planned subchannel of this type, the .2 Network, was announced and signed up affiliates but never launched amid the Great Recession. These subchannels offered stations the ability to expand their advertising inventory and offer lower prices on the secondary services. In addition to services signing up national affiliates, some station groups were starting to experiment around this time. CBS considered, but never launched, a complementary secondary channel, named "CBS 2" (not to be confused with CBS stations that broadcast on channel 2). In early 2007, Ion Media, which owned a network of transmitters serving most major American markets, launched its 24-hour kids channel Qubo (owned by Canada-based Corus, Scholastic, and NBCUniversal, closed in late February 2021) and health and wellness service Ion Life. Weigel launched MeTV, which had formerly only been a local service in two Midwest cities: Chicago and Milwaukee, on a national basis in December 2010; four years later, it was the most widely distributed multicast network. It remains the most-watched; in 2021, it had an average primetime audience of 752,000, almost double the next-highest diginet and greater than cable TV channels such as Bravo, Lifetime, and A&E.

As digital multicast services began to proliferate and earn viewers in the 2010s, they also became more specialized in an attempt to stand out and reach potential viewers. However, those that were not owned by large station groups and thus could not count on a backbone of significant national coverage struggled to negotiate distribution, having to do so with individual stations in each of the nation's more than 200 television markets. This market favored new services launched by the station groups. The business was also maturing significantly due to the rise of cord cutting, enabling some services to make a profit off advertising. Nielsen's list of top 100 television channels in 2016 did not contain any diginets; in 2018, eight made the list. This led to increased mergers and acquisitions activity. In 2017, the E. W. Scripps Company acquired Katz Broadcasting for $302 million. The purchase was notable for adding four diginets: the women-aimed Escape (now Ion Mystery), the men-targeted Grit, Bounce TV to serve the African-American/Black market, and the comedy-focused channel Laff. Scripps saw an opportunity to reduce the proportion of advertising on these services that was direct response and toward more expensive general-market advertising. The deal was seen as a validation of the diginet business. Scripps then acquired most of the Ion Media transmitter network and affiliated with the remainder in 2021, using the transmitters to broadcast a growing array of targeted, thematic diginets. Tegna, like Scripps an owner of full-service broadcast stations, acquired the Justice Network (now True Crime Network) and Quest for $91 million in 2019.

Multicast services typically pay local stations to affiliate, with higher payments going to stations with lower major channel numbers; owning the host station, as Scripps does with the Ion transmitters, allows for the reduction of costs by eliminating such payments in some markets. In some cases, switching stations can also lead to the service gaining carriage on cable in its broadcast area. For instance, in 2022, Sinclair Broadcast Group moved sci fi-oriented Comet, one of its three diginets, from WSBK-TV to WFXT in the Boston area, which also led to cable carriage for the Comet subchannel. Between the late 2010s and early 2020s, diginets such as NBC-owned Cozi TV began making national distribution deals with satellite, paid streaming, and ad-supported streaming providers that previously had not carried them, further increasing their reach. Further, the use of more efficient generations of MPEG-2 encoders by TV stations allowed for the transmission of additional subchannels from the same transmitter; a representative for Harmonic, a seller of encoders, noted that stations were seeing a return on their investment within less than a year from the additional revenue stream opened up by adding another diginet.

Public television stations in the United States were also comparatively early adopters of multicasting, and public TV content distributors joined a meeting in the mid-2000s, such as with the launch of lifestyle-focused Create by American Public Television in January 2006. In 2016, PBS began providing a 24-hour PBS Kids service to member stations replacing Spanish-language V-me.
