= .2 Network =

Planned television network

- Type: Planned but unlaunched broadcast television network
- Country: United States

Programming
- Picture format: 480i (SDTV); 720p (HDTV)

Ownership
- Owner: Guardian Enterprise Group
- Key people: Richard Schilg, President and Founder

History
- Former names: GTN

.2 Network (pronounced Dot-Two Network) was the name of a planned television network designed for digital television subchannels (hence the ".2") owned by Guardian Enterprise Group. Announced in 2008, the network never ended up going to air due to financial and technical difficulties.

== History ==
The channel was originally scheduled for launch on December 8, 2008. However, citing the planned 2009 conclusion of US digital TV transition, the launch of .2 Network was delayed until sometime in Spring 2009. Network executives had announced an intention to delay the launch until the channel could reach at least 30% of US households, a milestone which at that time was predicted not to be reached until October 2009, almost a full year behind the original schedule. Ultimately, this milestone was never reached. The network's website, which from 2008 to 2010 had previews and info of the network, was reduced to a logo and telephone number as of mid-2010. As of 2011, plans for the network were "on hold."

As of April 2013, the .2 website went offline, and with Sony announcing the fall 2013 launch of the GetTV network featuring the Columbia Pictures and TriStar Pictures film library through digital subchannels on Univision and UniMás stations, all of the network's announced film and television rights (detailed below) are now with other digital subchannel networks.

== Programming ==
.2 Network had licensing agreements with Sony Pictures Entertainment, NBCUniversal, Disney, Hallmark Channel and Screen Media. 2 Network's proposed programming included Gidget, The Flying Nun, and hundreds of blockbuster movies. The .2 network was also to be a source for multiple broadcast premieres, with the prime-time line-up following a movie channel like format. Other programs were to include lifestyle-related, special-interest, and E/I programming, including Animal Rescue and Missing for its affiliated stations.

After the announcement of .2 Network's plans, similar subchannel networks launched and usurped .2 Network's original programming rights. Antenna TV launched on January 1, 2011, utilizing the Sony Pictures Television library (itself later also used for Sony's own getTV). NBC Universal would also later sell rights of its programming to another similar network, Retro Television Network (RTV), but under their new Comcast ownership, removed their programming from RTV in June 2011, then signed a new agreement with MeTV after that to provide them most of the same programming, and launched their own network with library content, Cozi TV, in January 2013.

== Affiliates ==
.2 Network had confirmed carriage in the following markets:

Market	Station	Primary Affiliation	Current Ownership
New York City	TBD ^{2}	TBD	TBD
Los Angeles	TBD ^{2}	TBD	TBD
Chicago	TBD ^{2}	TBD	TBD
Philadelphia	TBD ^{2}	TBD	TBD
San Francisco - Oakland - San Jose	TBD ^{2}	TBD	TBD
Houston	KHOU^{6}	CBS	Tegna, Inc. (Was owned at the time by Belo Corporation)
Detroit	WDIV-TV ^{6}	NBC	Graham Media Group (formerly Post-Newsweek Stations)
Tampa	WTVT^{6}	Fox	Fox Television Stations
Miami - Fort Lauderdale	TBD ^{2}	TBD	TBD
Orlando - Daytona Beach	WKMG-TV	CBS	Graham Media Group (formerly Post-Newsweek Stations)
Portland, Oregon	KPTV or KPDX^{1}	Fox or MyNetworkTV	Gray Media (Was owned at the time by Meredith Corporation)
Kansas City, Missouri	KCTV ^{4}	CBS	Gray Media (Was owned at the time by Meredith Corporation)
Columbus, Ohio	W23BZ-D (flagship)^{5,6}	Independent/Bounce TV	Urban One (Was owned at the time by Guardian Enterprise Group)
San Antonio	KSAT-TV	ABC	Graham Media Group (formerly Post-Newsweek Stations)
Roanoke - Lynchburg, VA	WDRL-TV (now WZBJ)	Independent (now MyNetworkTV)	Gray Media (Was owned at the time by MNE Broadcasting)
Lafayette, Louisiana	TBD ^{2}	TBD	TBD
Marquette, Michigan	TBD ^{2}	TBD	TBD
Alexandria, Louisiana	TBD ^{2}	TBD	TBD
Alpena, Michigan	WBKB-TV ^{3,6}	CBS	Morgan Murphy Media (Was owned at the time by The Marks Group)
Glendive, Montana	KXGN-TV ^{3,6}	CBS	The Marks Group

=== Notes ===
- ^{1}The licensee held a duopoly in the market, never confirming which station would have the subchannel
- ^{2}According to the .2 "first affiliates" press release, these markets were confirmed, but the identity of the affiliate station was not released. They did not appear on the network's website in the list of stations; in some cases these are one-station markets.
- ^{3}The station is the only station in the confirmed market (per the press release) suitable for carriage, but was never listed in the network's affiliate list.
- ^{4}The station itself confirmed carriage by one of their engineers on the phone.
- ^{5}Was previously announced for the subchannel to air on WSFJ-TV, until 2008, when Guardian sold the station to Trinity Broadcasting Network and moved its programming to a former TBN repeater, W23BZ.
- ^{6}The .2 subchannel at this station since been (or will be) occupied by another service.

== HDTV ==
.2 Network had plans to offer a 720p HDTV feed to its affiliates for either the subchannel or as a cable offering, despite some engineers' skepticism at the time of carrying two HDTV channels on one DTV frequency. This has since been rectified, but most digital subchannels not associated with the largest six English-language or two Spanish-language networks continue to carry their signals solely in 480i.
