= Defy (TV network) =

American digital multicast TV network

- Type: Digital multicast television network
- Country: United States
- Broadcast area: (64% U.S coverage)
- Headquarters: Atlanta, Georgia

Programming
- Language: English
- Picture format: 720p HDTV (Master feed); 480i SDTV (Most OTA subchannels)

Ownership
- Owner: Scripps Networks (2021–2024); Free TV Networks (50%, 2024–present); A+E Global Media (50%, 2024–present)
- Parent: E. W. Scripps Company (2021–2024); Jonathan Katz (50%, 2024–2026); Versant (50%, 2026–present); A+E Global Media (50%, 2024–present)

History
- Launched: July 1, 2021; 4 years ago
- Replaced by: Ion Plus (Scripps version)
- Former names: Defy TV (2021–24)

Links
- Website: defytvnet.com

Defy (also known by its original name Defy TV) is an American digital multicast television network owned by the Free TV Networks subsidiary of Versant in partnership with A+E Global Media, airing primarily reality shows from the latter company, having launched on July 1, 2021, with broadcast coverage of 64% of the United States.

== History ==
On March 2, 2021, the E. W. Scripps Company announced that it would launch two new multicast networks—Defy and TrueReal—in the wake of its acquisition of Ion Media and television transmitters shutting Qubo and Ion Plus down across the United States. The channels are part of Scripps's strategy to increase perception among cord cutters that do not have traditional pay TV packages.

The services launched on July 1, 2021 with 92% national coverage, mostly on Ion transmitters but also on subchannels of some Scripps local TV stations and by agreement with other station groups.

On March 10, 2023, Scripps announced that TrueReal would shut down on March 27, 2023, merging its programming into Defy TV.

On June 17, 2024, Scripps quietly announced on Defy's social media platforms that a refreshed version of Ion Plus would return on Defy TV's channel space on July 1, 2024. The A&E programming library would move to a new over-the-air digital network, Dare, owned by the Free TV Networks joint venture.

Shortly before the network's launch on July 1, 2024, Free TV Networks acquired the rights to the Defy branding from Scripps Networks and launched a new version of the network at 6:00 a.m. ET the same day, nixing its plan to launch under the originally announced Dare name. The "TV" portion of the original Defy name was removed prior to its immediate relaunch.

On July 1, 2025, Defy began to be carried anew by eleven Ion stations, this time under an affiliation agreement with Scripps, along with some new Gray stations after the expiration of other subchannel network deals.

== Programming ==
The network's schedule is mainly made up of repeats of unscripted shows from the library of A&E Networks (mainly A&E and History channels), including reality programs: Swamp People, American Pickers, Ax Men, Counting Cars, UFO Hunters, Forged in Fire and Pawn Stars.
