= Missing (TV program) =

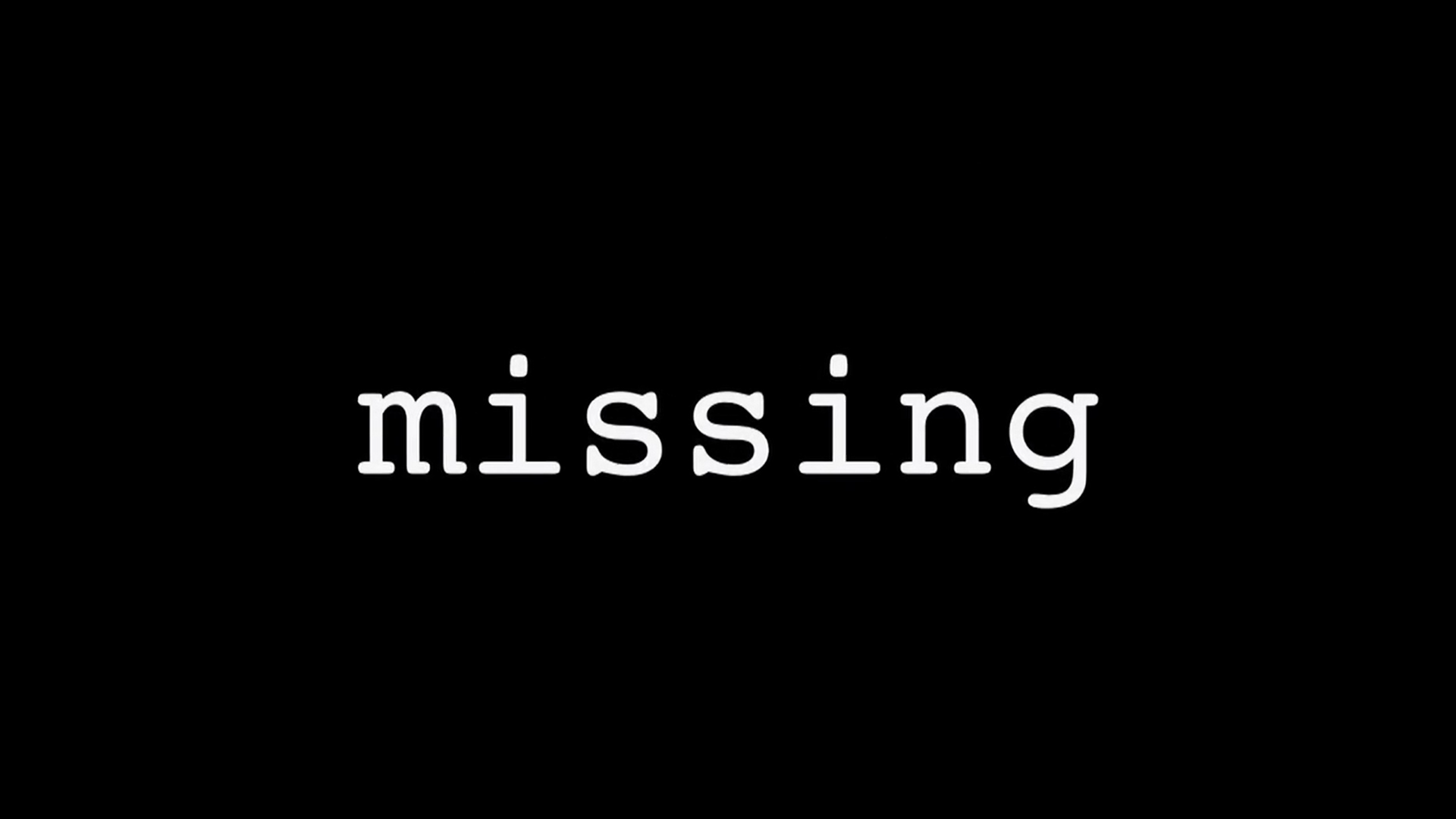
A screen shot of the program's title card

Missing is a weekly syndicated television program in the United States profiling real cases of missing people. The series is produced by Storrs Media/Telco Productions, Inc. and the show's host is the producer's president and founder, Alex Paen. The series debuted on September 4, 2003, and is still in production. An episode is 30 minutes and has household areas where local broadcasters can showcase missing people. The show is considered to be Educational/Informational under the Children's Television Act of 1990 since 2011.

According to the official website, as of July 20, 2026, 1,672 individuals featured on Missing have been safely recovered.

== Format ==
The show displays around 20 pictures of missing children and adults per episode. It begins with the account and description of the person, taking specific notice of body modifications, visible injuries and scars. Episodes (especially older ones) include video clips made by KidSmartz to teach children watching what to do in dangerous situations.

The show also includes Internet Safety Tips (a person, usually an adult or teenager, suggests some tips on how to stay safe online) and a Safety Quiz. (The video is produced by KidSmartz, showing a child doing the worst thing in the situation and then being quizzed on what the child should have done in the situation).

Nearing the end of the show, a "roundup" is presented showing the person (or people) pictured with their first and last name. Some roundups contain four individuals at a time (usually when they are all missing and have the same surname). An individual is shown for two seconds; more time is allowed depending on how many individuals are in the same slide.

Music from the series is composed by Larry Brown; the male whispers are added during the editing process.

== Broadcasting ==
Episodes are distributed operating a satellite system and are aired on Wednesdays at 6:00 AM–6:30 AM Eastern Time. The episodes are closed captioned and broadcast weekly, though some air it a twice a week. The program is commonly aired on weekends (7:00 AM–11:00 AM) and is a standard variety for E/I programming among U.S. broadcasters; it is aired on national television networks like Catchy Comedy.
