= CBS 2 =

CBS 2 may refer to:

== Airports ==
- Estevan (Blue Sky) Aerodrome near Estevan, Saskatchewan, Canada

== Television stations in the United States ==
=== Owned-and-Operated ===
- KCBS-TV in Los Angeles, California
- KDKA-TV in Pittsburgh, Pennsylvania
- WBBM-TV in Chicago, Illinois
- WCBS-TV in New York, New York

=== Currently affiliated ===
- KALB-TV-DT2 in Alexandria, Louisiana (cable channel; broadcasts on channel 5.2)
- KBOI-TV in Boise, Idaho
- KGAN in Cedar Rapids, Iowa
- KPSP-CD in Palm Springs, California (cable channel; broadcasts on channel 38)
- KREM in Spokane, Washington
- KTVQ in Billings, Montana
- KTVN in Reno, Nevada
- KUTV in Salt Lake City, Utah
- WFMY-TV in Greensboro, North Carolina
- WKTV-DT2 in Utica, New York

=== Formerly affiliated ===
- KFEQ-TV (now KQTV) in St. Joseph, Missouri (1953–1967)
- KTWO-TV in Casper, Wyoming (1957–1980)
- KXMA-TV-DT2 in Dickinson, North Dakota (primary from 1956–2016 and DT2 from 2016–2026)
  - Part of the KX Television Network
- TV2 (cable only) in U.S. Virgin Islands (2009–2018)
- WBAY-TV in Green Bay, Wisconsin (1953–1992)
- WJBK in Detroit, Michigan (1948–1994)
- WKAQ-TV in San Juan, Puerto Rico (1954–1967)
- WMAR-TV in Baltimore, Maryland (1948–1981)
- WTWO/WLBZ-TV in Bangor, Maine (1955–1959)
