= Blue Stream (company) =

American cable TV provider in Florida

Blue Stream Fiber
- Industry: Telecommunications
- Headquarters: Coral Springs, FL
- Products: cable television, cable telephone, broadband, Total Home WiFi, Total Property WiFi, DIRECTV, TiVo
- Website: www.bluestreamfiber.com

Blue Stream Fiber is a privately held telecommunications company headquartered in Coral Springs, Florida. Founded in 1975, the company has grown into a leading fiber-based broadband provider serving residential communities across Florida and Texas. It delivers fiber-optic internet, television, and voice services to more than 150,000 households in over 500 residential communities.

Blue Stream Fiber operates multi-gig capable fiber-to-the-home (FTTH) networks and specializes in serving homeowner associations (HOAs), condominium associations (COAs), multifamily properties, and master-planned developments through community-wide and bulk service agreements. The company is known for its focus on deploying advanced fiber infrastructure within residential communities and collaborating with boards, developers, property managers, and asset owners to implement tailored connectivity solutions.

Its service offerings include symmetrical multi-gig internet speeds, managed Wi-Fi solutions for both homes and entire properties, Android-based television platforms, DIRECTV options, and digital voice services. The company has experienced sustained growth through network expansion, strategic acquisitions, and entry into new markets.

The company has received several workplace recognitions, including Top Workplace honors from the South Florida Sun Sentinel and Orlando Sentinel. It has also received industry and innovation awards, such as consecutive Diamond Level recognitions in the FLCAJ Readers’ Choice Awards, BIG Innovation Awards in 2023 and 2026, and was recognized in Broadband Communities’ Top 100 list for 2025 — a roster highlighting organizations making significant impacts in advancing broadband connectivity.

The company is privately held and majority-owned by GI Partners, with Sixth Street as a co-investor.

== History ==
Blue Stream Fiber was founded in 1975 as Coral Springs Cablevision, a local cable television provider serving Coral Springs, Florida.

Following acquisition by Schurz Communications in 1978, the company expanded and rebranded as Advanced Cable Communications.

In 1999, the company launched its internet services and went on to deploy its first fiber-to-the-home (FTTH) infrastructure within select communities in 2001, marking an early transition toward fiber-based broadband delivery. In 2015, it introduced gigabit-speed services as part of its continued broadband network upgrades.

In August 2016, Schurz Communications sold Advanced Cable Communications to private investment firm Twin Point Capital. The company later rebranded as Blue Stream Fiber, reflecting a strategic shift from traditional cable operations to a fiber-focused telecommunications model.

In 2020, private equity firm GI Partners acquired a majority stake in Blue Stream Fiber, supporting further network investment and geographic expansion. That same year, the company acquired ITS Fiber, expanding its footprint throughout Florida's Treasure Coast.

In 2024, Sixth Street joined GI Partners as a strategic investor in Blue Stream Fiber. Also in 2024, the company announced expansion into Texas with plans to enter the Houston market, marking its first major growth outside Florida.
