= Scripps Networks =

American digital multicasting network media company

Scripps Networks, LLC
- Formerly: Katz Broadcasting (2014–2021)
- Type: Division
- Industry: Media
- Predecessor: ION Media
- Founded: February 3, 2014; 12 years ago
- Founder: Jonathan Katz
- Headquarters: Atlanta, Georgia, United States
- Key people: Lisa Knutson (president); Jeffrey Wolf (Chief distribution officer)
- Products: Television networks
- Number of employees: 130 (2017)
- Parent: E. W. Scripps Company (2017-present)
- Subsidiaries: Bounce TV; Court TV; Grit; Laff; Scripps News; Ion Media (Ion Television, Ion Plus, and Ion Mystery)
- Website: scrippsnetworks.com

Scripps Networks, LLC, formerly known as Katz Broadcasting, is an American specialized digital multicasting network media company and a division of the E. W. Scripps Company. The company owns (as of 2026) seven broadcast television networks, nine FAST streaming networks and a streaming service that each carry programming with specified formats targeted at individual demographics.

Originally, Katz sold the network to affiliated TV stations via ad split, but by October 2015, had moved to carriage fees in exchange for the network getting the ad inventory due to greater inventory with stations adding a third or fourth subchannel.^{:1} Their networks used direct response advertising as a meter of viewers before switching to Nielsen rating C-3.^{:3}

== History ==
Katz Broadcasting, LLC was founded on February 3, 2014, by Jonathan Katz, who was chief operating officer of Bounce TV and formerly worked at the Turner Broadcasting System (TBS) in Atlanta, Georgia. The company was announced concurrently with the announced launches of its first two networks, Ion Mystery / Escape and Grit TV, which were both launched that April with Univision and UniMás owned-and-operated stations run by Univision Communications as its charter station group. Besides Jonathan Katz, some of the initial investors included some Bounce investors notably Gray Television and Al Haymon (born 1955). At some point, E. W. Scripps Company also became an owner, purchasing 5% of the company.

Katz and Bounce Media share staff from the former company's launch, including Jonathan Katz (who is president and chief executive officer of Katz Broadcasting, while continuing as chief operating officer) and Jeffrey Wolf (Katz's chief distribution officer and Bounce's executive vice president of network distribution). Katz and Bounce continued to share executive staff with the hiring announcement of Jim Weiss, (a former executive at the sports marketing agency CSE) as the former's then senior vice president of corporate communications in August.

On January 18, 2015, Katz Broadcasting announced the launch of its third specialty network and O.T.A. subchannel of, Laff, a comedy-focused network that was tapped for an April 15 debut with ABC Owned Television Stations and Scripps serving as its core charter affiliate stations groups. On March 24, 2015, Katz signed a multi-network agreement with the Meredith Corporation that would add all three Katz-owned networks to the Meredith-owned stations in five cities / media markets, boosting Laff's national coverage up to that time to 50%, Ion Mystery / Escape's to 58%, and Grit's to 78% of all U.S. television markets. Escape and Grit switched from direct response advertising as a meter of viewers to Nielsen rating C-3 late 2015 with Laff expected to follow suit.^{:3}

On June 15, 2016, Katz Broadcasting signed a multi-network agreement with Nexstar Broadcasting / Media Group and operated affiliated TV station companies that would bring all three Katz-owned networks (as well as Bounce TV) to stations owned and/or operated by Nexstar in 54 markets, jumping national coverage of both Escape and Laff to 85% and Grit's coverage to 93%.

On August 1, 2017, Scripps announced the purchase of Katz and its three networks plus Bounce which Katz operated, for $292 million, acquiring the other 95% of the company. Katz will remain based out of Atlanta, Georgia as an autonomous division of E. W. Scripps. The purchase was completed on October 2, 2017.

In December 2018, Turner Broadcasting sold the rights to the brand and programming library of defunct cable network Court TV (which had been relaunched as TruTV a decade earlier in 2008) to Katz, who then re-launched it as an over-the-air digital network the following year in May 2019. On September 30, 2019, Katz Broadcasting rebranded Escape as Court TV Mystery to make it a Court TV brand extension.

Following Scripps' acquisition of Ion Media in 2021, the Katz-owned networks were moved over to the subchannels of Ion-owned stations beginning February 27, 2021.

On March 2, 2021, Scripps announced that it would launch two new complementary multicast networks, Defy TV and TrueReal, in the aftermath of Scripps' acquisition of Ion Media and additional television transmitters across the United States. The channels are part of Scripps's strategy to increase penetration among cord cutters that do not have traditional pay TV packages.

Both services launched on July 1 with 92 percent national coverage, mostly on Ion transmitters but also on subchannels of some Scripps local TV stations and by agreement with other station groups.

On April 6, 2021, Scripps announced that it would expand Newsy into a free over-the-air network, as well as being available on streaming platforms, starting October 1. The network would be available over-the-air on Scripps-owned Ion Television stations, along with some traditional Scripps stations without an Ion sister station and the former Ion-owned stations transferred to Inyo Broadcast Holdings, along with offering the network to other station groups. It also announced plans to relocate Newsy's national headquarters to Atlanta.

In advance of the move exclusively to over-the-air distribution, Scripps began to notify traditional cable and satellite providers, along with Internet television providers, at the end of March that it would end distribution of Newsy via those means effectively on June 30, 2021. The Newsy over-the-air network launched on October 1, 2021.

On February 24, 2022, the Court TV Mystery network was rebranded as Ion Mystery, with the "Ion" brand now more established regarding procedural dramas in general, including Ion Mystery's overall programming, whereas Court TV is more associated with its news division.

On March 10, 2023, Scripps announced that TrueReal would shut down on March 27 of that month, merging its programming with that of Defy TV. After its closure, Scripps will lease the open spectrum on its owned and operated stations to Jewelry Television.

On June 17, 2024, Scripps quietly posted a promotional video to the social media presences of Ion Plus and Defy TV that the latter would be wound down at the end of June as its programming moves to another unrelated network, Dare, launching on July 1, with Ion Plus returning to over-the-air availability on Defy TV's channel spaces. The A&E programming on Defy would move to an unrelated network named Dare, owned by Free TV Networks. Free TV Networks purchased Defy TV's branding from Scripps Networks and launched Dare under the new name Defy on July 1.

On February 9, 2026, Scripps announced that they would be selling Court TV to Dan Abrams' Law & Crime for an undisclosed amount.

== Major assets ==
=== Television networks ===
- Bounce Media, LLC
  - Bounce TV – a broadcast network which specializes in Black-focused programming
  - Bounce XL – its streaming counterpart
  - Brown Sugar – an over-the-top (OTT) streaming service featuring 1970s Black cinema and TV series
- Court TV Media, LLC
  - Court TV – a broadcast network specializing in legal news and live trial coverage
  - Court TV Legendary Trials – its streaming counterpart carrying archived coverage of past trials and true crime programming
- Grit Media, LLC
  - Grit – a broadcast network mainly airing Western films and series
  - GritXtra – its streaming counterpart
- Laff Media, LLC
  - Laff – a broadcast network specializing in sitcoms
  - Laff More – its streaming counterpart
- Scripps News (Scripps Media, LLC; formerly Newsy) – a streaming, general news network which augments news coverage nationally for Scripps stations
- Ion Media, LLC
  - Ion Television – a general entertainment broadcast network
  - Ion Mystery (Escape Media, LLC; formerly Escape/Court TV Mystery) – a counterpart broadcast network mainly carrying procedural crime dramas and true crime programming
  - Ion Plus – a broadcast and streaming counterpart of Ion Television. Originally, the broadcast component of Ion Plus closed on 2021 after the Scripps acquisition but later relaunched on July 1, 2024.

== Former networks ==
=== Ion Media ===
- Qubo – A digital broadcast network which carried children's programming. Folded on February 28, 2021 after the Scripps acquisition.
- Ion Shop – A digital broadcast network which carried paid programming. Folded on February 28, 2021 after the Scripps acquisition.

=== Scripps Networks ===
- TrueReal – a digital broadcast O.T.A. network which carried reality programming targeted to women from the A&E Networks library. Folded on March 27, 2023.
- Defy TV (Defy TV Media, LLC) – an O.T.A. broadcast network / subchannel for local stations carrying reality programming from the A&E Networks library. Folded on July 1, 2024. Programming moved to Defy, owned by Free TV Networks.
- Scripps News - a digital O.T.A. broadcast all-news network and subchannel on several local stations, (formerly called Newsy, 2008-2022). Two years later at the end of September 2024, Scripps announced it would close its O.T.A. subchannel of news and commentary programming on November 15, 2024, laying off large numbers of staff, and moved to online / internet streaming on the following day of November 16th.
