= Ion Plus =

American television network

- Type: Broadcast television network; FAST television channel
- Country: United States
- Broadcast area: Nationwide
- Headquarters: West Palm Beach, Florida

Programming
- Language: English
- Picture format: 1080i (HDTV); 480i (SDTV)

Ownership
- Owner: E. W. Scripps Company
- Parent: Ion Media; (Scripps Networks, LLC)
- Sister channels: Bounce TV; Court TV; Grit; Ion Television; Ion Mystery; Laff

History
- Launched: February 19, 2007; 19 years ago (as Ion Life); July 1, 2024; 2 years ago (relaunch)
- Replaced: Defy TV (Scripps Networks iteration, 2024 return over-the-air)
- Closed: February 28, 2021; 5 years ago (original) (OTA only)
- Former names: Ion Life (2007–19)

Links
- Website: ionplustv.com

Availability

Streaming media
- Services: DirecTV Stream; Frndly TV; FuboTV; PLEX; Pluto TV; The Roku Channel; Samsung TV Plus; Sling Freestream; Tablo TV; Tubi; YouTube TV

Ion Plus is an American broadcast television network and group of FAST television channels owned by the Scripps Networks subsidiary of the E. W. Scripps Company. The network originally launched in 2007 as Ion Life, maintaining a format featuring lifestyle programming focused on health and wellness, cooking, home decor, and travel. With expanded cable carriage, in 2019, Ion Media converted the network into a general entertainment format that matched that of parent network Ion Television, featuring day-long marathons of various drama series.

Ion Plus was carried mainly as a digital multicast service on Ion Media Networks-owned stations as well as select Ion Television affiliates, usually to the third subchannel; its base national feed was also available on select cable and satellite providers. In select markets, Ion Plus has had main channel placement, allowing it must-carry coverage on local cable and satellite services.

Ion Plus ceased broadcasting over-the-air in 2021 after Ion Media's acquisition by the E. W. Scripps Company and merger with Katz Broadcasting to form Scripps Networks, but continued to air as an advertising-supported video-on-demand network through several AVOD streaming services, including Samsung TV Plus, and Vizio WatchFree. On July 1, 2024, Ion Plus returned to over-the-air broadcasting as a replacement for Defy TV.

== History ==
=== As a lifestyle-oriented network ===
The network launched on February 19, 2007, focusing on generalized health and lifestyle programming; the network replaced a three-hour timeshift channel which depending on geographical location, carried what was then called i: Independent Television's Eastern or Pacific time zone feeds. Ion Media Networks originally planned to name the network "iHealth" to match i's name, until it was subsequently rebranded as Ion Television in September of that year. The network launched as Ion Life on February 19, 2007, over the third digital subchannel of Ion Media Networks's television stations. Under this format, it mainly aired cooking, travel, home decor, DIY design and home improvement, and automotive remodeling programs; most of the shows were imported Canadian series distributed by Bell Media, Corus Entertainment and Shaw Media, with some American content mixed in.

On January 14, 2008, as part of a carriage agreement that allowed the provider to continue to carry Ion Television, Ion Media Networks reached an agreement with Comcast to carry both Ion Life and its children's-targeted network Qubo on its systems. Subsequently, in May 2010, Ion Media signed carriage agreements with Advanced Cable Communications and Comcast's system in Colorado Springs, Colorado to add Ion Life to digital tiers in several markets.

Even though Ion Life's parent network Ion Television overhauled its logo as part of an extensive rebranding on September 8, 2008, Ion Life retained its existing logo – a green variant of the logo Ion Television used from 2007 to 2008 – and graphics package, the latter of which remained in use until 2011. In February 2010, the network added theatrically released feature films to its schedule, usually airing from 7:00 p.m. to 12:00 a.m. Eastern Time (the airtimes vary, sometimes starting earlier or ending later depending on the length and number of the films) on Monday through Friday evenings. By 2012, the number of films featured on the network had decreased, with more lifestyle-oriented programming being added to its prime time schedule; films returned to the lineup full-time the following year. During December (expanding to between Thanksgiving and Christmas in 2018), the network ran a limited selection of Christmas movies that were previously shown on Ion Television through its contracts with MarVista Entertainment and Hybrid LLC. In January 2015, Ion Life began incorporating blocks of infomercial-based and compensated religious paid programming scheduled in an interspersed manner alongside its lifestyle programs in the morning and early afternoon.

Former logo, as Ion Life, used from March 27, 2017, to June 30, 2019

Former Ion Plus logo used from July 1, 2019, to July 1, 2024.

On March 27, 2017, the network's logo was updated to reflect Ion Television's current design language. Throughout 2017 and 2018, Ion Media purchased several stations which became channel sharing partners with their stations after the 2016 FCC spectrum auction, specifically to exploit those stations' existing must-carry coverage on multichannel television providers to allow the addition of Ion Life to their lineups, carriage which had been refused to the network in the past when it was exclusively transmitted as a digital subchannel. (Ion's main channel had traditionally been the only Ion Media-owned network carried on many providers.) Many of these stations were formerly owned-and-operated stations associated with the Trinity Broadcasting Network (TBN), which withdrawn from over-the-air broadcasting in non-critical markets.

=== As a general entertainment network; Scripps purchase ===
On February 1, 2019, Ion Life converted into a general entertainment service focusing on day-long marathons of drama series included as part of Ion Television's content agreements (including some programs that were previously carried on the main network). To reflect its format change from a lifestyle network and draw a connection to the new format's compliment to that of the main Ion network, on July 1 of that year, the network was relaunched as Ion Plus. The "Ion Plus" brand – following the parent network's rebrand as Ion Television in 2007 – previously was the name of a secondary Ion national feed that Paxson Communications/Ion Media Networks began distributing to cable providers in 2005, which incorporated Ion Life programming in timeslots occupied by paid programming on the main network to address concerns by providers because of the network's occupation of ¾ of its programming time with an infomercial. (During the Ion network's "i: Independent Television" branding era, replacement programming on the feed consisted of previous Pax-era series and public domain and barter syndication content; a 2008 management overhaul resulted in Ion gradually reducing its dependency on infomercials for additional revenue, eventually negating the need for the "Ion Plus" feed.)

As a general entertainment network, acquired entertainment programming was reduced to 13 hours per day (from 11:00 a.m. to 1:00 a.m. Eastern Time), with infomercials filling the remaining overnight and morning timeslots. (Sister children's network Qubo—which also originally maintained a 24-hour entertainment schedule from its launch—added a five-hour-long overnight block of infomercials, beginning at the same start time as the Ion Life/Plus block, on January 8, 2019.) On September 8, 2020, the network replaced its slate of factual educational programs that fulfilled its educational content requirements with an extension of Ion Television's "Qubo Kids Corner" block on Monday through Wednesday mornings; the addition of the Qubo E/I block was due to commitments that Ion Media had to fulfill after adding eight primary affiliates—Ion-owned KILM, WFPX, WDPX-TV, WCLJ-TV, WDLI, WSFJ and WLWC, and affiliate WIFS—to its slate through the TBN deals and ancillary affiliation agreements.

On September 24, 2020, the E. W. Scripps Company announced an agreement to buy Ion Media for $2.65 billion. The transaction, which closed on January 7, 2021, saw Ion Television, Ion Plus, Qubo and infomercial service Shop Ion integrated into Scripps' Katz Broadcasting subsidiary (operator of fellow multicast networks Court TV, Ion Mystery, Bounce TV, Laff and Grit).

=== Conversion to FAST channel ===
On January 14, 2021, Scripps announced that it would discontinue Ion Plus, Qubo, and Shop Ion effective February 28. The spectrum allocated to the networks on the former Ion Media stations will be repurposed to carry the Katz-owned networks starting March 1, with the initial slate of Ion Television O&Os adding those networks following the expiration of Scripps/Katz's existing contracts with other broadcasting companies the day prior, and other stations following suit as contracts with existing affiliates expire throughout 2021 and 2022; in markets where major network affiliates operated by Scripps already carry a Katz-owned network, some will be offloaded to the Ion stations to free up limited spectrum capacity during the ATSC 3.0 transition. Several of the Ion Plus full-power stations paired with Ion Television stations were also concurrently sold off to INYO Broadcast Holdings to alleviate local ownership conflicts and national cap issues related to Scripps' purchase of Ion Media under the FCC's regulatory station ownership limits. Ion Plus was replaced by selected Katz-owned networks on Ion affiliates (including O&Os spun off to INYO Broadcast Holdings, which obtained affiliations with certain Katz networks as part of a broader agreement with Scripps/Ion) on February 27, and was replaced on Scripps-owned Ion stations post-shutdown on March 1.

While both Qubo and Ion Shop ceased operations altogether on February 28, 2021, Scripps continued to provide a live feed of Ion Plus to smart TV providers and their advertiser-supported channel portals even after its over-the-air discontinuation that same date, including Vizio's WatchFree service, and Samsung TV Plus on that manufacturer's Tizen-supported sets. It, alongside the main Ion network, has since added additional streaming coverage through Xumo, Tubi, Freevee and The Roku Channel, as well as their associated mobile phone/tablet apps on both Google Play and iOS, appealing specifically to a cord-cutting audience looking for alternative entertainment options.

=== Over-the-air relaunch ===
On June 17, 2024, Scripps quietly posted a promotional video to the social media presences of Ion Plus and Defy TV that the latter would be wound down at the end of June as its programming moves to another unrelated network owned by Free TV Networks which launched with the same library on July 1, 2024 (originally named Dare, but with the Defy branding transferring from Scripps last-minute), with Ion Plus returning to over-the-air availability on Defy TV's channel spaces. MacGyver and Scorpion were added to Ion Plus to augment its schedule as the mainline Ion network added further sports programming to its schedule. As ION's secondary network, Ion Plus carries sports overflow coverage for the network's NWSL and WNBA in the rare event a match/game on Ion Television runs long.

== Affiliates ==
As of November 2015, Ion Plus had current and pending affiliation agreements with 65 television stations encompassing 34 states and the District of Columbia. The network has an estimated national reach of 58.29% of all households in the United States (or 182,130,362 Americans with at least one television set). Like parent network Ion Television, the network's stations almost exclusively consist of network-owned stations. Ion Plus' programming was available by default via a national feed that was distributed directly to select cable and satellite providers in markets without a local Ion Television station that carries the network.

The first iteration Ion Plus did not have any over-the-air stations in several major markets, most notably Toledo, Ohio; San Diego, California; Charlotte, North Carolina; Richmond, Virginia; Green Bay, Wisconsin; and Cincinnati, Ohio. A key factor in the network's limited national broadcast coverage is the fact that Ion Media Networks does not actively seek over-the-air distribution for the network on the digital subchannels of other network-affiliated stations (in contrast, its parent network Ion Television – which had similarly limited national coverage following the digital television transition – has begun subchannel-only affiliation arrangements through agreements with NBCUniversal Owned Television Stations' Telemundo Station Group subsidiary and Nexstar Media Group during 2014 and 2015), with very few stations that contractually carry the network's programming (with limited exceptions in markets and Anchorage, Alaska). As a result, Ion Media Networks owns the vast majority of the stations within Ion Plus's affiliate body, a situation that changed when the 2024 iteration launched on July 1, 2024, though some markets with a traditional Scripps station in an Ion duopoly have allowed the new Ion Plus coverage in cities it formerly was not in, in addition to its established streaming coverage nationwide.
