= Bethlehem, Florida =

Unincorporated community in Florida, U.S.

Bethlehem is an unincorporated community in Holmes County, Florida, United States. The community is located at 30°55′29″N 85°44′21″W.

== Telecommunications ==
The WTVY-TV Tower, which measures 1,901 ft, is located in Bethlehem. The tower was built in 1978, and as of 2020, it is operated by Gray Media Group, Inc. It is the second tallest radio tower in Florida.
