= Scripps News =

American television and streaming news network

- Country: United States
- Headquarters: Atlanta, Georgia

Programming
- Language: English

Ownership
- Owner: E. W. Scripps Company
- Parent: Scripps Networks

History
- Launched: 2008; 18 years ago
- Founder: Jim Spencer
- Closed: November 16, 2024; 21 months ago (over-the-air only)
- Former names: Newsy (2008–2022)

Links
- Website: scrippsnews.com

Scripps News is a free ad-supported streaming television (FAST) streaming news channel, and a former digital subchannel network headquartered in Atlanta, Georgia, and owned by the Scripps Networks division of the E. W. Scripps Company. It was previously known as Newsy, from its launch in 2008 until December 31, 2022.

Its content is available free on OTT platforms including FuboTV, Pluto TV, The Roku Channel, YouTube TV, Xumo, Haystack News, and Samsung TV Plus.

== History ==
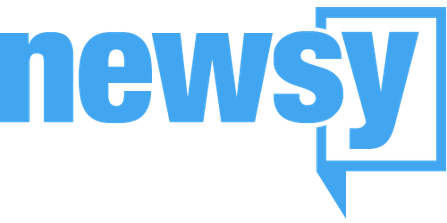
Newsy's former logo was used from 2015 until its relaunch as an over-the-air broadcast network on October 1, 2021.

Newsy was founded in 2008. In its early years, Newsy operated primarily as a syndication business, selling news and original content to major digital journalism brands that included AOL/Huffington Post, Microsoft and Mashable.

In January 2014, Newsy was acquired for $35 million by the E. W. Scripps Company.

Three years later, in September 2017, Scripps then announced it would take over RLTV's (Retirement Living TV) cable and satellite carriage agreements for approximately 26 million subscribers and reprogram the network with Newsy's lineup of shows.

Newsy had six US offices or news bureaus located at: Columbia, Missouri (which is part of a collaboration with Scripps), together with Mizzou's Missouri School of Journalism (associated with the University of Missouri at Columbia); with five others at: Chicago; Cincinnati; New York City; Denver; and Washington, D.C.

Logo from October 1, 2021, to December 31, 2022.

On April 6, 2021, Scripps announced that it would expand Newsy into a free over-the-air TV network, and being available on streaming platforms starting October 1. The network would be available over-the-air on Scripps-owned Ion Television stations, along with some traditional Scripps local stations without an Ion sister station and the former Ion-owned stations transferred to Inyo Broadcast Holdings, along with offering the network to other station groups. It also announced plans to relocate Newsy's national headquarters to Atlanta. The Newsy over-the-air network launched on October 1, 2021, debuting a new logo and graphical identity (created by Elevation) that day with the identity and goal to provide "balanced", impartial reporting without political punditry or debates like those of their United States cable news competitors.

In advance of the move exclusively to over-the-air distribution, Scripps began to notify traditional cable and satellite providers, along with some Internet television providers, at the end of March that it would end distribution of the network via those means on June 30, 2021, ending the nearly 15-year life of the channel space, including its time as RLTV.

On September 29, 2022, Scripps announced that Newsy would be renamed Scripps News on January 1, 2023. The rebranding comes as part of the establishment of a new national news department of the same name at Scripps, combining its Washington bureau with the national bureau of its local station group.

On September 27, 2024, Scripps announced it would shut down Scripps News's over-the-air channel by November 16 and eliminate more than 200 jobs, maintaining a 50-person crew in its national bureau to serve its owned-and-operated stations and produce live weekday coverage for streaming platforms. Scripps stated that its sales team had been stymied by an advertising market that refused to buy time on channels carrying news and political programming, with the advertisers saying it was too "risky" in light of the "polarized nature" of the American population, which prevented Scripps News from earning the revenue needed to be a viable service.

On November 15, the entire team of Scripps News programs began to bid farewell to Scripps News's over-the-air channel, with each show anchor thanking the viewers for their viewership back to the Newsy days and credit rolls of the entire channel's staff closing out each program. The channel officially shut off operations as a terrestrial subchannel network at 6:00 a.m. EST on November 16, with "In Real Life" (episode titled "Post-Trauma") being the last show to air on the channel's space. In 2025, Scripps News sold the catalog of In Real Life to the new nonprofit Evident Media.

== Distribution ==
As of June 26, 2023, most of Scripps's major network affiliate stations carried an hour of Scripps News during weekday afternoons, replacing The List and The Upside, which were produced by Scripps's lifestyle division. As of November 2024, Scripps News has current and pending affiliation agreements with 330 television stations in over 100 television markets encompassing 46 states, covering 81.05% of the United States.

On November 15, 2024, Scripps News announced that it had started rolling out a new focus on streaming and connected TV while winding down its over-the-air broadcast.

== Awards ==
Scripps News's editorial content, and its TV apps, have won the following awards:

- Apple TV's Best of 2015 list
- National Edward R. Murrow award for its news documentary, "The War and Money Project" (2015)
- Society of Environmental Journalists Awards for Reporting on the Environment (2018)
- Online Journalism Award for its investigation, "Case Cleared" (2019)
- Investigative journalism award from the Society of Professional Journalists for "Case Cleared" (2019)
- National Edward R. Murrow award for its news documentary, "Walkout" (2019)
- Robert F. Kennedy Journalism Award for "A Broken Trust" (2020)
- Scripps Howard Award for innovation for its newsroom collaboration, "Newsy+Bellingcat" (2020)
- News Emmy Award for "In Real Life: Plastic Time Bomb" (2023)
- Deadline Club Award and New York Press Club Award for "Scripps News Investigates: Ukraine's Stolen Orphans" (2024)

Scripps News's editorial content has numerous award nominations, including:

- The News & Documentary Emmy Awards
- The Digiday Publishing Awards
- The Webby Awards
