= Free TV Networks =

American digital multicasting and FAST network media company

Free TV Networks, LLC
- Type: Subsidiary
- Industry: Media
- Founded: November 7, 2023; 3 years ago
- Founder: Jonathan Katz
- Headquarters: Atlanta, Georgia, USA
- Key people: Jonathan Katz (President/CEO)
- Products: Television networks
- Brands: 365BLK; Defy; Outlaw; Busted; Pam Grier’s Soul Flix
- Parent: Versant
- Website: freetvnetworks.com

Free TV Networks, LLC is an American broadcasting company. Owned by Versant, it operates digital multicast and free ad-supported streaming television (FAST) networks.

The company was founded by Jonathan Katz, who had previously run Katz Broadcasting prior to its sale to the E. W. Scripps Company in 2017.

== History ==
In November 2023, Jonathan Katz—who had owned Katz Broadcasting prior to its sale to the E. W. Scripps Company in 2017—announced a new venture known as Free TV Networks, which would similarly operate digital multicast television networks, as well as free ad-supported streaming television (FAST) services. The new company planned to launch two networks on January 1, 2024, including The365 (later renamed 365BLK)—which would focus on programming targeting African Americans, and Outlaw—which would broadcast Westerns. The new company reached agreements with Lionsgate and Warner Bros. Discovery to provide content, and Gray Media to provide an initial affiliation base serving at least 80% of the country at launch.

Among the new company's initial board members were boxing promoter Al Haymon and civil rights activist Martin Luther King III, who were both among the original investors in Katz's Bounce TV.

In April 2024, Free TV Networks announced a third network known as Dare, a joint venture with A+E Networks that would feature unscripted programming from its library. On July 1, 2024, the network launched as Defy, after Scripps Networks discontinued its version of the channel (which had also carried A+E Networks programming, and was replaced by Ion Plus) and Free TV Networks assumed rights to the branding. Defy returned to selected Ion Media stations in July 2025 as part of an affiliation agreement with Scripps.

On March 1, 2025, Free TV launched a fourth network, Busted, devoted to reality and "caught on camera"-based true crime programs following law enforcement (such as Cops Reloaded, Court Cam, Jail, and World's Wildest Police Videos among others).

In December 2025, Versant—a then-upcoming spin-off of Comcast and NBCUniversal—announced that it would acquire Free TV Networks. The acquisition was completed in January 2026, with Free TV Networks becoming a business unit within Versant, and Katz joining the company as an executive to continue managing the networks' day-to-day operations.

In February 2026, CBS News and Stations closed its own digital network Fave TV, and replaced it across its stations with either Outlaw or 365BLK.

== Channels ==
365BLK
Content for African Americans
Busted
Crime-related reality television
Defy
"Unscripted" series
Outlaw
Western ("Old West") content
Pam Grier’s Soul Flix
"Bad" movies, including the Blaxploitation genre
