= Ion Mystery =

American digital multicast TV network

- Type: Digital broadcast television network
- Country: United States
- Broadcast area: Nationwide coverage: 92%
- Affiliates: List of Ion Mystery affiliates
- Headquarters: Atlanta, Georgia

Programming
- Language: English
- Picture format: 720p (HDTV) (Note: Most affiliates broadcast Ion Mystery in 480i (SDTV).)

Ownership
- Owner: Scripps Networks, LLC (E. W. Scripps Company)
- Parent: Ion Media
- Key people: Jonathan Katz (president/CEO, Katz Broadcasting); Walter Naarr (SVP of programming)
- Sister channels: Bounce TV; Court TV; Grit; Ion Television; Ion Plus; Laff; Scripps News

History
- Founded: April 3, 2014; 12 years ago
- Launched: August 18, 2014; 12 years ago
- Founder: Jonathan Katz
- Former names: Escape (2014–2019); Court TV Mystery (2019–2022)

Links
- Website: ionmystery.com

Availability

Terrestrial
- Digital terrestrial television: See List of Ion Mystery affiliates

Streaming media
- Service(s): FrndlyTV, FuboTV, Plex, Samsung TV Plus, The Roku Channel, Tubi

Ion Mystery (formerly Escape and Court TV Mystery, stylized as ESCAPE and MYSTERY; branded on-air as Mystery) is an American digital multicast television network owned by Ion Media, a division of the Scripps Networks subsidiary of the E. W. Scripps Company. It focuses primarily on mystery, true crime, and police/legal procedural programs.

It is available in several media markets via the digital subchannels of terrestrial television stations and on the digital tiers of select cable providers through a local affiliate of the network.

== History ==
Katz Broadcasting announced the formation of Escape and sister network Grit on April 3, 2014, with a formal launch scheduled for that summer. When the network was first announced, Katz Broadcasting entered into an affiliation agreement with Univision Communications, which planned to launch Grit in 22 markets served by a station owned by the group or operated through local marketing agreements with Entravision Communications – giving Grit affiliates in 17 of the 20 largest U.S. television markets (including markets such as New York City, Los Angeles, Chicago, and Dallas-Fort Worth). The network immediately sought carriage on the digital subchannels of television stations owned by other broadcasting companies.

On August 11, 2014, Katz announced that the two networks would launch simultaneously on August 18. Escape launched at 12:00 p.m. Eastern Time on that date, with the 1981 film Body Heat as the network's inaugural broadcast.

Escape's logo from 2014 until the rebranding to Court TV Mystery in September 2019.

On August 1, 2017, in an expansion of the company's existing interest, the E. W. Scripps Company announced it would purchase a 95% majority stake in Katz Broadcasting's assets (Escape, Grit, and Laff as well as the managerial rights for Bounce TV parent Bounce Media, LLC) for $292 million. Although Scripps assumed ownership of the group upon the purchase's completion on October 2, Katz will remain headquartered in Marietta, Georgia as an autonomous division of its new corporate parent.

Court TV Mystery's logo from 2019 until the rebranding to Ion Mystery in February 2022.

On September 30, 2019, Escape was rebranded as Court TV Mystery, serving as an extension to the Court TV brand.

Following Scripps' acquisition of Ion Media in 2021, many of its digital subchannels, including Court TV and Court TV Mystery, were moved over to Ion-owned affiliates and on Scripps stations, were separated from stations also carrying Court TV, causing viewer confusion regarding the channel positions and carriage status of the two networks. The network was subsequently rebranded to Ion Mystery on February 24, 2022; the new branding aligns with Ion's current focus on procedural dramas, whereas the Court TV brand would be associated with true crime programming.

== Programming on Ion Mystery ==
=== Current programming ===
- 18 Wheels of Justice
- Bones
- Criminal Minds
- Crime Stories
- CSI: Miami
- Hawaii Five-O
- The Listener
- MacGyver
- Midsomer Murders
- Murderous Affairs
- NCIS: New Orleans
- Scorpion

=== Former programming ===
- American Greed
- Born Behind Bars
- Cheaters
- Corrupt Crimes
- Crime 360
- Crime Watch Daily
- CSI: Crime Scene Investigation
- CSI: NY
- Da Vinci's Inquest
- The First 48
- Forensic Files
- I Killed My BFF
- LAPD: Life on the Beat
- Law & Order
- Leverage
  - Leverage: Redemption
- Manhunters: Fugitive Task Force
- Scandal
- Snapped
- Someone They Knew with Tamron Hall
- Swift Justice with Nancy Grace
- Unsolved Mysteries

== Programming ==
Ion Mystery mainly features a mix of procedural crime dramas and mystery series, as well as off-network reality-based crime re-enactment series and some films.

Originally, the network had a specific focus on true crime programming directed explicitly towards women. Katz Broadcasting president and CEO Jonathan Katz based the demographic-targeted concept of the Escape and male-targeting Grit on Bounce TV, a network Katz co-founded with Martin Luther King III and Andrew Young in 2011 that is targeted at Black audiences; Katz stated Escape and Grit would be "the...first-ever (adult) male-centric and female-centric broadcast networks," featuring different programming from other classic television multicast networks that Katz claimed were "generic brands with generic names, created by studios to serve the studios" (referring to NBCUniversal's Cozi TV and Sony's getTV, and indirectly to Weigel Broadcasting's MeTV, which was independently created but licenses programming from several studios).

=== Movies ===
Ion Mystery carries a broad roster of crime drama and mystery film releases from the 1980s to the 2000s (including theatrical feature films, made-for-TV movies, and documentaries) on Saturdays and Sundays. The network's movie lineup relies primarily on an extensive library of titles through multi-year program licensing agreements with several major film studios, including Reel One Entertainment, Multicom Entertainment Group, Sonar Entertainment, Warner Bros. Motion Picture Group (distributed through Warner Bros. Domestic Television Distribution), Universal Pictures (through NBCUniversal Syndication Studios), Paramount Pictures (through Trifecta Entertainment & Media), and Sony Pictures Entertainment (through Sony Pictures Television).

=== Television series ===
The majority of Ion Mystery's schedule consists of off-network reality-based crime re-enactment series. Shortly before the network's launch, on August 1, 2014, the network acquired the syndication rights to three true crime series – Forensic Files, Snapped, and the Dennis Farina run of Unsolved Mysteries – through respective deals with Trifecta Entertainment & Media, NBCUniversal Television Distribution, and Cosgrove/Meurer Productions for its initial schedule.

In May 2016, the network acquired the syndication rights to American Greed and Corrupt Crimes, under agreements with NBCUniversal Television Distribution and Bellum Entertainment. In conjunction, Katz announced the network's entry into original programming by entering into a production agreement with Bellum to develop five true crime shows for first-run broadcast on the network; these programs included Lady Killers (about women killing someone close to them), Murderous Affairs (centering on "lethal love affairs"), It Takes a Killer (which profiles infamous murders), Deep Undercover (a series hosted by Joe Pistone, that profiles real-life undercover missions), and They Kill for It (which deals with passion-motivated and fully planned killings). Among the five announced shows, however, only Deep Undercover actually aired, due to various issues which did not involve Escape or Katz, but Bellum unable to produce the shows as talent was unpaid for previous Bellum productions, and their refusal to continue working with any further Bellum-involved productions; that company went bankrupt, then out of business, in 2019.

On December 6, 2017, Katz signed a multi-year licensing agreement with Warner Bros. Domestic Television Distribution to acquire the syndication rights to Cold Case. The 2003–10 CBS crime drama – the first scripted program acquisition for Escape – joined the network on January 1, 2018 with a twelve-episode marathon, before being added to its regular schedule the following night (January 2). Several other series, including John Doe, Killer Instinct, and the original Law & Order have since been picked up by the network, along with the Canadian series DaVinci's Inquest, a mainstay of syndication since the mid-2000s.

== Affiliates ==
As of January 1, 2018, Ion Mystery has current or pending affiliation agreements with 165 television stations in 65 media markets (including 24 of the top 30), covering 86% of all households in the United States (or 268,780,687 Americans with at least one television set). Originally, Katz sold Escape and sister network Grit to prospective affiliate stations under an advertising split structure; by October 2015, the company had shifted to having affiliates pay carriage fees to provide Escape and Grit programming, in exchange for a share of the network's ad inventory; the company also initially utilized direct response advertising as a metric for viewership for Escape. In September 2015, Katz enrolled Escape and sister network Grit to begin having their viewership measured under the Nielsen national ratings, in addition to switching to the Nielsen rating C-3 ratings metric for advertising.

When the network was first announced, Katz Broadcasting entered into an affiliation agreement with Univision Communications, which planned to launch Escape in 22 markets served by a station owned by the group or operated through local marketing agreements with Entravision Communications – giving Escape affiliates in 17 of the 20 largest U.S. television markets (including markets such as New York City, Los Angeles, Chicago, and Dallas-Fort Worth). The network immediately sought carriage on the digital subchannels of television stations owned by other broadcasting companies; on June 17, 2014, Katz signed group deals to carry Escape on stations owned and/or operated by Raycom Media in six markets. On July 17, 2014, Katz announced affiliation deals with the Cox Media Group to carry Escape on WAXN-TV in Charlotte, North Carolina and KOKI-TV in Tulsa, Oklahoma. It also reached a deal with PMCM TV, LLC to carry Escape and Grit on KJWP in the Philadelphia market, and with Citadel Communications to carry the network on its stations in Providence (WLNE-TV) and Lincoln (KLKN). Katz also expanded its affiliation agreement with Univision Communications to add Univision-owned stations in Washington, D.C., San Francisco, and Phoenix to the group's originally announced Escape charter affiliates. At the network's introduction in August 2014, Escape had affiliation agreements with television stations in 33 media markets (including stations in 23 of the 50 largest Nielsen markets), with an approximate estimated reach of 50% of all television-equipped households in the United States.

On May 18, 2015, the E. W. Scripps Company signed a multi-year agreement with Katz Broadcasting to expand distribution of Escape and sister networks Grit and Laff, which extended Escape's availability to 70 million homes (covering 60% of the U.S.), adding the network to Scripps-owned stations in markets such as Detroit (WMYD); Indianapolis (WRTV); Kansas City (KMCI-TV), Cincinnati (WCPO-TV), and Milwaukee (WTMJ-TV). On November 16, 2015, Katz announced new affiliation deals with Media General and Tribune Media adding the network to eight more markets, including Seattle (KCPQ), Grand Rapids (WXSP-CD), Albuquerque (KASY-TV), St. Louis (KTVI), and New Orleans (WGNO). Additional agreements were reached on June 15, 2016, that brought Escape to stations owned and/or operated by Nexstar Broadcasting Group (as well as subsidiaries Mission Broadcasting and White Knight Broadcasting) and for Cordillera Communications's KVOA/Tucson. By January 2017, Escape had affiliates covering over 76% of all U.S. households with at least one television set.
