= 1984 in American television =

In 1984, television in the United States saw a number of significant events, including the debuts, finales, and cancellations of television shows; the launch, closure, and rebranding of channels; changes and additions to network affiliations by stations; controversies, business transactions, and carriage disputes; and the deaths of individuals who had made notable contributions to the medium.

== Events ==
Date	Event
January 2	Oprah Winfrey takes over as host of WLS-TV's A.M. Chicago, which would serve as a forerunner to her nationwide, syndicated talk show.
January 9	Wendy's "Fluffy Bun" advertisement is first broadcast, which gains Clara Peller and her "Where's the beef?" catchphrase national fame.
January 9	Something About Amelia, a story concerning incest, is broadcast by ABC. Glenn Close, Ted Danson, and Roxana Zal are the main actors.
January 22	During CBS's broadcast of Super Bowl XVIII, Apple Computer Company heralds the introduction of its Apple Macintosh personal computer with the advertisement "1984", the only time it is broadcast on national television.
January 23	Professional wrestler Hulk Hogan defeats The Iron Sheik to win his first World Wrestling Federation championship at Madison Square Garden; the match is televised by the MSG Network.
January 26	Andy Kaufman makes what turns out to be his final television appearance as host of The Top.
January 27	Michael Jackson's hair catches fire during the filming of a Pepsi commercial.
February 1	Arts & Entertainment Network launches from the merger of ARTS and RCA's The Entertainment Channel. It originally broadcasts after kids' channel Nickelodeon signs off.
February 1	Lifetime is launched from the merger of Hearst/ABC's Daytime and Viacom's Cable Health Network.
February 1	In Bakersfield, California, CBS affiliate KPWR-TV changes its call letters to KGET, in preparation for an affiliation swap with NBC affiliate KERO-TV the following month.
February 10	NBC airs the made-for-television movie Little House: The Last Farewell. Serving to tie up loose ends to storylines on the main Little House on the Prairie series, The Last Farewell concerns Charles and Caroline deciding to visit Walnut Grove. They learn that a railroad tycoon actually holds the deed to the township, and he wants to take it over for his own financial gain. Despite their best efforts, the townspeople are unable to drive the businessman away. At a town meeting, John Carter offers a supply of explosives that he has. Each man takes a turn blowing up his own building in an emotional farewell to the town.
February 20	17 of the 24 added minutes are utilized by ABC for the network television premiere of Superman II. Subsequent ABC airings of the longer version would be cut further for more advertising time. The full 146-minute extended cut was shown internationally, including in parts of Canada. As with the first film, Alexander and Ilya Salkind prepared a version for worldwide television release that re-inserted unused footage (in this case 24 minutes) into the film. It was through this extended version that viewers first caught a glimpse into the Superman II that might have happened had Richard Donner remained as director. In fact, a majority of the added footage was shot by Donner before Richard Lester became director.
February 25	Eddie Murphy participates in his final live episode as a cast member on NBC's Saturday Night Live. The remainder of his appearances for the season would only be in the form of previously recorded sketches. Murphy's final overall episode as a cast member would air on April 14.
February 26	KDRV in Medford, Oregon signs on as an ABC affiliate, giving the Medford market full-time access to all three networks for the first time.
February 26	CBS airs the network broadcast television premiere of Star Wars.
February 28	At the 26th Grammy Awards telecast by CBS, Michael Jackson wins a record-breaking eight Grammy Awards.
March 9-16	One of Field Communications' last stations, WKBD-TV, is sold to Cox Enterprises.
March 16	Gary Plauché shoots and kills Jeff Doucet, who had kidnapped, sexually assaulted, and molested Plauché's son, Jody. The killing was captured on camera by a local news crew. Doucet was flown back from California to Baton Rouge Metropolitan Airport, also known as Ryan Field, to face trial. Doucet arrived and was led in handcuffs by police officers through the airport at around 9:30 p.m., where Plauché was waiting for Doucet with a gun. Plauché was friends with several high-ranking police officers in the Baton Rouge Police Department; while many people believed that these contacts told Plauché where and when Doucet would be arriving, it was actually an employee of the local ABC affiliate WBRZ-TV who gave Plauché the information. A news crew from WBRZ-TV was also waiting for Doucet and had set up their cameras to record his arrival.
March 19	Denver's ABC affiliate KBTV changes its name to KUSA-TV to reflect its status with USA Today.
March 21	New England Sports Network, initially known as NESN is initiated.
March 25	WNOL-TV, an independent station goes on the air in New Orleans.
March 28	Actress Jeanne Cooper has her own real life facelift procedure performed onscreen during an episode of the CBS soap opera The Young and the Restless. Cooper's character, Katherine Chancellor is written as having the exact same procedure performed.
April 1	Nickelodeon celebrates its 5th anniversary.
April 7	After being cancelled by ABC following its third season, Too Close for Comfort with the aid of Metromedia, is revived for the first-run syndicated market, where it would run for at least, an additional three seasons.
April	John Houlihan wins the Natural Triple Jackpot worth $26,550 on The Joker's Wild, the largest such win on the show.
May 6	Minneapolis/St. Paul religious station WFBT converts to a general entertainment station after the Beverly Hills Hotel Corporation bought out the station, changing the calls to KITN-TV.
May 8	Happy Days airs its series finale, "Passages". However, five additional episodes would air from the end of June on through the end of September. The last episode to be aired on ABC, "Fonzie's Spots", is actually #251 in chronological order.
May 18	Character Bobby Ewing finds himself in the crossfire as a rival tries to gun down his brother J.R. on the season finale of the CBS series Dallas.
May 19	CBS tapes the Michael Larson episodes of Press Your Luck in which Larson wins $110,237 cash and prizes. (The episodes, which are split into two parts, would air on June 8 and 11.)
May 20	The wedding between Steve Andropoulos and Betsy Stewart on As the World Turns attracts 20 million viewers. This makes it the second highest-rated hour in American daytime soap opera history behind Luke and Laura's 1981 wedding on General Hospital.
June 23	On a broadcast of NBC's Game of the Week between the Chicago Cubs and St. Louis Cardinals, Cubs second baseman Ryne Sandberg hits two crucial, game tying home runs off of Cardinals closer Bruce Sutter in both the bottom of the ninth and tenth innings. The Cubs would go on to win the game in eleven innings, by the score of 12–11. Bob Costas and Tony Kubek were on the call for what would soon become known as "The Sandberg Game".
June 25	Piedmont Triad station WJTM-TV changes its name to WNRW to honor the death of general sales manager William N. Rismiller in a shooting incident at its studios June 5.
June 27	The U.S. Supreme Court rules in NCAA v. Board of Regents of University of Oklahoma that the National Collegiate Athletic Association's television plan violated the Sherman Antitrust Act. As a result, individual schools and athletic conferences are free to negotiate contracts on their own behalf. Together with the growth of cable television, this ruling results in the explosion of broadcast options currently available. Beginning in 1984, the College Football Association sells a television package to ABC and CBS. The Big Ten and Pacific-10 conferences sell their own separate package to ABC.
July 14	In what became known as "Black Saturday", Vince McMahon's World Wrestling Federation takes over Superstation WTBS' Saturday evening time period once occupied by Georgia Championship Wrestling.
July 17	CBS broadcasts W*A*L*T*E*R, a television pilot for the third spin-off of M*A*S*H. The pilot stars Gary Burghoff, who reprises his M*A*S*H character Corporal Walter "Radar" O'Reilly. Since the pilot is never picked up by CBS as a series, it is shown as a "CBS Special Presentation". It is shown once in the Eastern and Central time zones of the United States, but pre-empted on the West Coast by CBS News coverage of the Democratic National Convention. This is the only known broadcast of the pilot.
July 23	MTV broadcasts the live World Wrestling Federation event "The Brawl to End It All" from Madison Square Garden in New York City, where Wendi Richter won the WWF Women's Championship from The Fabulous Moolah.
July 28	ABC begins their coverage of the Summer Olympic Games from Los Angeles. Jim McKay and Peter Jennings served as hosts for the opening ceremonies. This is to date, the final time that ABC would broadcast the Summer Olympics. All subsequent, American network television coverage of the Summer games would be handled by NBC.
July 30	The soap opera Santa Barbara debuts on NBC.
July 30	Dallas/Ft. Worth independent station KNBN-TV changes its call letters to KRLD-TV after being bought out by Metromedia.
September 9	The Tyler-Longview market's lone television station KLTV finally receives competition when KLMG-TV (now Fox affiliate KFXK-TV) signs-on and takes KLTV's secondary CBS affiliation.
September 10	The game show Jeopardy! returns to television as a syndicated show with new host Alex Trebek.
September 14	Dan Aykroyd and Bette Midler host the first MTV Video Music Awards at New York City's Radio City Music Hall, an event which included Madonna's performance of the song "Like a Virgin".
September 16	The two hour pilot episode of Miami Vice airs on NBC. This episode started developing the trademark Vice style. Aspects of Miami Vice considered revolutionary lay in its music, cinematography, and imagery, which made large segments of each episode resemble a protracted music video.
September 17	The Transformers debuts in syndication.
September 18	The series finale of Three's Company airs on ABC following a three-episode story arc that also sets up the spin-off Three's a Crowd.
September 20	The Cosby Show debuts on NBC. Meanwhile, on ABC, the pilot episode for Who's the Boss? is also broadcast.
September 24	The game show Super Password premieres on NBC at 12:00 noon EST. The new version of the classic game show is one of the few shows to survive at a time period when many stations airs a local newscast, running for 4 1/2 years.
September 24	CBS affiliate WJKA (now Fox affiliate WSFX-TV) in Wilmington, North Carolina signs-on the air, giving Wilmington in-market affiliates of all three commercial networks.
September 27	Kelsey Grammer makes his first appearance as Frasier Crane in the third-season premiere of Cheers on NBC.
October 1	Montana, the last state in the Union without its own PBS station, gains one when Montana PBS launches.
October 1	Nickelodeon retires their silver pinball logo (although it would continue to be used in sign-offs until early 1985) and begins using the orange splat as their logo.
October 1	American Movie Classics is initiated.
October 6	SIN broadcasts the final of the 7th National OTI-SIN Festival live from the Miami Jai-Alai Fronton in Miami.
October 7	President Reagan and former Vice President Walter Mondale participate in their first presidential debate.
October 8	NBC broadcasts The Burning Bed, which features Farrah Fawcett as a woman who kills her abusive husband. The fact-based film is the highest-rated entertainment event of the 1984–1985 season.
October 11	Geraldine Ferraro becomes the first woman (and the only one until Sarah Palin in 2008) to participate in a presidential or vice presidential debate.
October 12	Tragedy strikes the CBS drama Cover Up. During filming for the seventh episode of the series, "Golden Opportunity," on Stage 17 of the 20th Century Fox lot, a scene is shot that calls for Mac Harper (Jon-Erik Hexum) to load bullets into a .44 Magnum handgun. Hexum is duly provided with a functional gun and blanks. The scene does not play as the director wanted it to in the master shot, causing a delay in filming. During the delay, Hexum, restless and impatient, begins playing around to lighten the mood. Unloading all but one (blank) round, Hexum spins the gun, and—simulating Russian roulette—puts the revolver to his right temple and pulls the trigger, apparently unaware of the danger. At a close enough range, the effect of the powder gasses is a small explosion, so although the paper wadding in the blank that Hexum discharged did not penetrate his skull, there was enough blunt force trauma to shatter a quarter-sized piece of his skull and propel the pieces into his brain, causing massive hemorrhaging. Hexum is then rushed to Beverly Hills Medical Center, undergoing five hours of surgery to repair his wounds. Six days later, on October 18, Hexum is declared brain dead at age 26.
October 21	Reagan and Mondale participate in their second and final presidential debate.
October 27	Turner Broadcasting System initiates the Cable Music Channel in the U.S., only to end it one month later.
November 10	On PBS Sesame Street celebrates its 15th anniversary.
November 12	Theresa Saldana appears as herself in the NBC movie Victims for Victims: The Theresa Saldana Story, a retelling of her 1982 stabbing incident and its aftermath.
December 8	The final episode of Captain Kangaroo airs. This ends a 29-year run on CBS that made it the longest-running nationally broadcast children's television program of its day.
December 15	One year after officially departing the cast of NBC's Saturday Night Live, Eddie Murphy returns to guest host. This would be Murphy's last appearance on the show (not counting a brief appearance during SNL's 40th Anniversary Special in 2015) until hosting again during the forty-fifth season in 2019.
December 17	George C. Scott plays Ebenezer Scrooge in a new version of the Dickens classic A Christmas Carol, broadcast by CBS.
December 17	The ABC soap opera One Life to Live changes its opening sequence and theme song, which lasted until 1991.
December 17	ABC purchases a majority stake of ESPN from Getty Oil Corp.
December 17	KLDO-TV in Laredo, Texas signs-on as an ABC affiliate, giving Laredo in-market affiliates of all three commercial networks (it is now an Univision affiliate).
December 28	On ABC, The Edge of Night ends its 28-year run. The soap opera started on CBS in 1956, moving to ABC in 1975.
December 28	During an interview backstage at Madison Square Garden for the ABC newsmagazine 20/20, reporter John Stossel tells professional wrestler David Schultz that he thought pro wrestling was fake. Schultz responds by hitting Stossel in the head twice, knocking him to the floor each time. The attack attracts a large amount of media coverage and is later aired not only on 20/20, but also on other network outlets. ABC itself later reports receiving more than 1,000 calls from viewers inquiring about Stossel's health.

== Programs ==
=== Debuting this year ===
Date	Title	Network
January 3	Riptide	NBC
January 4	Night Court	NBC
January 6	Blue Thunder	ABC
January 20	The Master	NBC
January 22	Airwolf	CBS
January 28	Mickey Spillane's Mike Hammer	CBS
March 6	a.k.a. Pablo	ABC
March 19	Kate and Allie	CBS
March 20	Shaping Up	ABC
March 31	Lifestyles of the Rich and Famous	Syndication
April	Video Music Box	WNYC-TV
April 4	Double Trouble	NBC
April 12	The Duck Factory	NBC
April 14	My Little Pony	Syndication
June 4	Danger Mouse	Nickelodeon
July 2	Scrabble	NBC
July 13	Brothers	Showtime
July 30	Santa Barbara	NBC
September 5	Heathcliff	Syndication
September 7	Kids Incorporated	Syndication
September 8	Dragon's Lair	ABC
September 8	Mighty Orbots	ABC
September 8	Turbo Teen	ABC
September 8	Challenge of the GoBots	Syndication
September 10	Voltron: Defender of the Universe	Syndication
September 13	Glitter	ABC
September 14	Hawaiian Heat	ABC
September 15	Snorks	NBC
September 15	Pink Panther and Sons	NBC
September 15	The Get Along Gang	CBS
September 15	Muppet Babies	CBS
September 15	Pole Position	CBS
September 15	Pryor's Place	CBS
September 16	E/R	CBS
September 16	Miami Vice	NBC
September 16	Punky Brewster	NBC
September 17	The Transformers	Syndication
September 18	Hunter	NBC
September 19	Highway to Heaven	NBC
September 20	The Cosby Show	NBC
September 20	Who's the Boss?	ABC
September 22	Cover Up	CBS
September 22	Hot Pursuit	NBC
September 22	Finder of Lost Loves	ABC
September 23	Paper Dolls	ABC
September 25	Three's a Crowd	ABC
September 26	It's Your Move	NBC
September 27	Partners in Crime	NBC
September 30	Tales from the Darkside	Syndication
September 30	Murder, She Wrote	CBS
October 3	Charles in Charge	CBS
October 7	Out of Control	Nickelodeon
October 8	Trivia Trap	ABC
October 10	Dreams	CBS
October 26	V	NBC
December 30	Crazy Like a Fox	CBS

=== Resuming this year ===
Title	Final aired	Previous network	New title	Returning network	Date of return
People are Funny	1960	NBC	Same	Same	March 24
Showoffs	1975	ABC	Body Language	CBS	June 4
Fat Albert and the Cosby Kids	1981	CBS	Same	Syndication	September 1
Jeopardy!	1979	NBC	Same	Syndication	September 10
Let's Make a Deal	1981	Syndication	The All-New Let's Make a Deal	Same	September 17
Password Plus	1982	NBC	Super Password	Same	September 24

=== Changing networks ===
Show	Moved from	Moved to
Showoffs	ABC	CBS
Fat Albert and the Cosby Kids	CBS	Syndication
Jeopardy!	NBC	Syndication

=== Ending this year ===
Date	Title	Debut
March 10	We Got It Made (returned in 1987)	1983
April 2	Automan	1983
April 7	Mama's Family (returned in 1986)	1983
April 10	a.k.a. Pablo	1984
April 16	Blue Thunder	1984
April 27	Masquerade	1983
April 30	That's Incredible!	1980
May 15	Oh Madeline	1983
May 19	Fantasy Island	1978
May 22	Hart to Hart	1979
May 28	One Day at a Time	1975
June 1	Tattletales	1974
June 2	Whiz Kids	1983
June 14	Lottery!	1983
July 4	Real People	1979
July 11	The Duck Factory	1984
July 27	Hollywood Squares (returned in 1986)	1966
August 11	Boone	1983
September 1	Monchhichis	1983
September 1	The Little Rascals	1982
September 1	Pac-Man	1982
September 1	Richie Rich	1980
September 1	Rubik, the Amazing Cube	1983
September 1	The Littles	1983
September 5	Jennifer Slept Here	1983
September 8	The Flintstone Funnies	1982
September 18	Three's Company	1977
September 24	Happy Days	1974
November 10	The Puppy's Further Adventures	1982
December 1	The Dean Martin Celebrity Roast	1974
December 1	The New Scooby and Scrappy-Doo Show	1983
December 8	Captain Kangaroo	1955
December 8	Pole Position	1984
December 8	Pryor's Place	1984
December 11	AfterMASH	1983
December 25	Welcome to Pooh Corner	1983
December 25	Paper Dolls	1984
December 28	The Edge of Night	1956
December 28	Hot Pursuit	1984
December 29	Partners in Crime	1984

=== Entering syndication ===
Show	Seasons	In Production	Source
Benson	5	Yes	
Bizarre	4	Yes	
Fat Albert and the Cosby Kids	7	Yes	
The Greatest American Hero	3	No	
Hart to Hart	5	No	
Trapper John, M.D.	5	Yes	
Voyagers!	1	No	

=== Made-for-TV movies and miniseries ===
- V: The Final Battle

== Networks and services ==
=== Launches ===
Network	Type	Closure date	Notes	Source
Sportsvue	Cable television	April 3		
Home Team Sports Network	Cable television	April 4		
American Christian Television System	Cable television	May 15		
NetSpan	Cable television	June 19		
American Movie Classics	Cable television	October 1		
Cable Music Channel	Cable television	October 26		
MGM/UA Premiere Network	Cable television	November 10		

=== Conversions and rebrandings ===
Old network name	New network name	Type	Conversion Date	Notes	Source
The Entertainment Channel	Arts & Entertainment Channel	Cable television	February 1		
Alpha Repertory Television Service	Arts & Entertainment Channel	Cable and satellite	February 1		
Cable Health Network	Lifetime	Cable television	February 1		
Daytime and Lifetime Medical Television	Lifetime	Cable television	February 1		

=== Closures ===
Network	Type	Closure date	Notes	Source
Mobil Showcase Network	Cable television	Unknown		
Spotlight	Cable television	February 1		
Cable Music Channel	Cable television	November 30		

== Television stations ==
=== Station launches ===
Date	City of License/Market	Station	Affiliation	Channel	Notes/Ref.
January 21	Santa Fe/Albuquerque, New Mexico	KCHF	11	Religious independent	
January 28	Glenwood Springs, Colorado	KCWS	3	Independent	
February 1	Indianapolis, Indiana	WPDS-TV	59	Independent	
February 14	Fort Walton Beach, Florida	WPAN	53	Independent	
February 18	Nashville, Tennessee	WCAY-TV	30	Independent	
February 22	Green Bay, Wisconsin	WSCO	14	Religious independent	
February 23	Lake Havasu City, Arizona	K45AJ	45	Independent	
February 26	Medford, Oregon	KDRV	12	ABC	
March 5	Greensboro, North Carolina	WLXI	61	Independent	
March 7	Appleton/Green Bay, Wisconsin	WBOU	32	Independent	
March 25	New Orleans, Louisiana	WNOL-TV	38	Independent	
March 30	Seattle, Washington	KQFB	20	Independent	
April 1	Greenville, South Carolina (Spartanburg, South Carolina/Asheville, SC)	WHNS	21	Independent	
April 16	Concord, New Hampshire	WNHT	21	Independent	
April 17	Dallas-Fort Worth, Texas	KLTJ	49	TBN	
May 5	El Paso, Texas	KINT	26	Spanish independent	
May 12	San Angelo, Texas	KIDY	6	Independent	
May 13	Decatur, Illinois (Champaign/Springfield, Illinois)	WFHL	23	Religious independent	
June 1	Columbus, Ohio	WTTE	28	Independent	
June 25	Harlingen/Brownsville/McAllen, Texas	KLUJ-TV	44	Independent	
June 29	Wenatchee, Washington	KCWT-TV	27	Independent	
July 5	Florence, South Carolina	WGSE	43	Independent	
July 8	New Orleans, Louisiana	WLAE-TV	32	Educational independent	
July 10	Lake Havasu City, Arizona	K25AL	25	TBN	
July 24	Hopkinsville, Kentucky	W43AG	43	Independent	
July 31	Las Vegas, Nevada	KRLR	21	Independent	
August	Jacksonville, Illinois	WJPT	14	PBS	
August 1	Hagerstown, Maryland	WJAL	68	Independent	Now licensed to Silver Spring, Maryland
August 7	Burlington, North Carolina (Greensboro/Winston-Salem, North Carolina)	WRDG	16	Independent	
August 22	Chicago, Illinois	W13BE	13	Independent	
August 28	Lebanon-Nashville, Tennessee	WJFB	66	Independent	
September 9	Toccoa, Georgia	WNEG	32	Independent	
September 9	Tyler, Texas	KLMG-TV	51	CBS	
September 10	Greenwood/Anderson, South Carolina	WNEH	38	PBS	Part of South Carolina Educational Television
September 10	Jacksonville, Florida	W10AX	10	The Box	
September 14	Hartford, Connecticut	WTIC-TV	61	Independent	
September 23	Dayton, Ohio	WRGT-TV	45	Independent	
September 24	Wilmington, North Carolina	WJKA	26	CBS	
October 1	Bozeman/Butte, Montana	KUSM-TV	9	PBS	Flagship of Montana PBS
October 1	Kalamazoo, Michigan (Battle Creek/Grand Rapids, Michigan)	WGVK	52	PBS	
October 1	Macomb, Illinois	WMEC	22	PBS	
October 1	San Diego, California	KTTY	69	Independent	
October 24	Miami, Florida	W30AB	30	PBS	Translator of WPBT
October 31	Asheville, North Carolina (Greenville/Spartanburg, South Carolina)	WASV	62	Independent	
October 31	Casper, Wyoming	KFNB	20	ABC	
November	Columbus, Georgia (Auburn, Alabama)	WXTX	54	Independent	
November 24	Richmond, Virginia	WVRN-TV	63	Religious independent	
November 30	Jackson, Mississippi	WDBD	40	Independent	
December 2	Cotati, California	KRCB	22	PBS	
December 3	Albany, New York	WUSV	45	Independent	
December 15	Flint, Michigan	WSMH	66	Independent	
December 17	Laredo, Texas	KLDO-TV	27	ABC	
December 18	Laredo, Texas	K61CV	61	unknown	
December 24	Pensacola, Florida (Mobile, Alabama)	WJTC	44	Independent	
December 31	Tucson, Arizona	KDTU	18	Independent	
Unknown date	Billings, Montana	K05HS	5	Daystar	
Unknown date	Minneapolis, Minnesota	K58BS	58	TBN	

=== Network affiliation changes ===
Date	City of License/Market	Station	Channel	Old affiliation	New affiliation	Notes/Ref.
February 1	Bakersfield, California	KGET-TV	17	CBS	NBC	
Unknown date	Cheyenne, Wyoming	KYCU-TV	5	CBS	ABC (primary); NBC (secondary)	

== Births ==
Date	Name	Notability
January 2	Kristen Hager	Canadian actress (Valemont, Being Human)
January 4	Robin Sydney	Actress (Drake & Josh)
January 6	Kate McKinnon	Actress (The Big Gay Sketch Show, Saturday Night Live) and comedian
January 6	Hilaria Baldwin	Podcaster
January 11	Eddie Alvarez	Martial artist
January 19	Nathan Ruegger	Voice actor (Tiny Toon Adventures, Animaniacs, Histeria!)
January 19	Mickey Sumner	Actress
January 24	Ashley C. Williams	Actress
January 25	Jay Briscoe	American professional wrestler (d. 2023)
January 26	Layla Kayleigh	English-American television host
February 1	Lee Thompson Young	Actor (The Famous Jett Jackson, Rizzoli & Isles) (d. 2013)
February 1	Abbi Jacobson	Actress
February 3	Matthew Moy	Actor (2 Broke Girls, Steven Universe)
February 7	Anna Kooiman	Anchor
February 8	Cecily Strong	Actress (Saturday Night Live)
February 11	Aubrey O'Day	American singer and reality television personality
February 14	Matt Barr	Actor
February 15	Josh Byrne	Actor (Step by Step)
February 19	Jennifer Lahmers	Anchor
February 20	Trevor Noah	South African comedian and actor (The Daily Show)
February 20	Audra Mae	Singer
February 24	Wilson Bethel	Actor (The Young and the Restless, Hart of Dixie)
February 28	Noureen DeWulf	Actress
February 28	Melanie Chandra	Actress
February 29	Mark Foster	Singer
March 2	Trent Garrett	Actor (All My Children, Andi Mack) and model
March 4	Sam Marin	Voice actor (Regular Show)
March 7	Brandon T. Jackson	Actor
March 7	Nicole Lapin	American television news anchor
March 7	Alex Somers	American visual artist
March 10	Olivia Wilde	Actress (House)
March 12	Jaimie Alexander	Actress (Watch Over Me, Kyle XY, Blindspot)
March 13	Noel Fisher	Canadian actor (X-Men: Evolution, Shameless)
March 14	Liesel Matthews	Actress
March 16	Carrie Kemper	Writer
March 20	Justine Ezarik	YouTube personality and actress (Annoying Orange, iJustine)
March 20	Christy Carlson Romano	Actress (Even Stevens, Kim Possible) and singer
March 25	Katharine McPhee	Actress and singer (American Idol, Smash, Scorpion)
March 26	Sara Jean Underwood	Model and TV host (Attack of the Show!)
March 28	Bill Switzer	Canadian-American actor (Mummies Alive!, Eerie, Indiana: The Other Dimension, Sabrina: The Animated Series, X-Men: Evolution)
March 30	Helena Mattsson	Swedish-American actress (666 Park Avenue)
March 31	Molly Qerim	American television personality
April 2	Ashley Peldon	Actress (The Mommies) and sister of Courtney Peldon
April 3	Chrissie Fit	Actress (General Hospital, Milo Murphy's Law)
April 5	Marshall Allman	Actor (Prison Break, True Blood)
April 6	Al Mukadam	Canadian actor
April 8	Taran Noah Smith	Actor (Home Improvement)
April 8	Kirsten Storms	Actress (Days of Our Lives, Kim Possible, General Hospital)
April 10	Cara DeLizia	Actress (So Weird)
April 10	Mandy Moore	Actress (Tron: Uprising, Sheriff Callie's Wild West, High School USA!, This Is Us, Tangled: The Series) and singer
April 11	Kelli Garner	Actress (Pan Am)
April 16	Claire Foy	English actress (Upstairs Downstairs)
April 18	America Ferrera	Actress (Independent Lens, Ugly Betty, The Good Wife, DreamWorks Dragons, Superstore)
April 19	Kelen Coleman	Actress
April 20	Tim Jo	Actor (Glory Daze, The Neighbors, This Is Us, For All Mankind, Reasonable Doubt)
April 20	Harris Wittels	Comedian (d. 2015)
April 21	Shayna Fox	Voice actress (The Oz Kids, Rocket Power, All Grown Up!)
April 21	Desmin Borges	Actor
April 22	Michelle Ryan	British actress (Bionic Woman)
April 23	Jesse Lee Soffer	Actor (As the World Turns, The Mob Doctor, Chicago P.D.)
April 24	Lindsey Gort	Actress
April 25	Jillian Bell	Actress
April 25	Melonie Diaz	Actress
April 26	Emily Wickersham	Actress (NCIS)
April 26	Ryan O'Donohue	Voice actor (Recess, Batman Beyond)
April 27	Patrick Stump	Musician (Fall Out Boy) and actor (Robot Chicken)
April 29	Firass Dirani	Australian actor (Power Rangers Mystic Force)
April 29	Hallie Jackson	Anchor
April 29	Taylor Cole	Actress (Summerland)
May 1	Kerry Bishé	Actress
May 3	Morgan Kibby	Actress (100 Deeds for Eddie McDowd) and singer
May 4	Cheryl Burke	Host
May 8	Julia Whelan	Actress (Once and Again)
May 8	Van Robichaux	Writer
May 9	Ezra Klein	TV host
May 12	Clare Bowen	Australian actress and singer (Nashville)
May 13	Ginger Orsi	Actress and singer
May 14	Mark Zuckerberg	American media magnate
May 17	Alejandro Edda	Mexican-American actor (Narcos: Mexico, Fear the Walking Dead)
May 23	Adam Wylie	Actor (Picket Fences, Hey Arnold!, Pepper Ann, As Told by Ginger, American Dragon: Jake Long, Legion of Super Heroes, The Secret Saturdays, Jake and the Never Land Pirates)
May 24	Sarah Hagan	Actress (Freaks and Geeks)
May 27	Darin Brooks	Actor (Days of Our Lives, The Bold and the Beautiful, Blue Mountain State)
May 29	Carmelo Anthony	NBA basketball player
May 29	Kaycee Stroh	Actress (High School Musical)
May 30	DeWanda Wise	Actress
June 1	Megan Ganz	Writer
June 4	Jillian Murray	Actress
June 5	Simon Rich	Screenwriter
June 6	Antonia Prebble	New Zealand actress (Power Rangers Mystic Force)
June 6	Brandon Scott Jones	Actor
June 8	Torrey DeVitto	Actress (Beautiful People, One Tree Hill, Pretty Little Liars, The Vampire Diaries, Chicago Med)
June 10	Betsy Sodaro	Actress
June 13	Phillip Van Dyke	Actor (Noah Knows Best, voice of Arnold on Hey Arnold! (1997–99))
June 15	Wayne Sermon	Musician
June 17	John Gallagher Jr.	Actor
June 18	Ian Jones-Quartey	Voice actor and producer (OK K.O.! Let's Be Heroes)
June 18	Christopher Ragland	English actor (Thomas & Friends, The Amazing World of Gumball)
June 19	Paul Dano	Actor
June 20	Kevin Ryan	Actor
June 22	Yassir Lester	Actor
June 26	Aubrey Plaza	Actress (Parks and Recreation)
June 27	Emma Lahana	New Zealand actress (Power Rangers Dino Thunder)
June 27	Khloé Kardashian	Actress (Keeping Up with the Kardashians)
June 30	Fantasia	Singer (American Idol, Fantasia for Real)
July 5	Danay García	Cuban actress (Prison Break, Fear the Walking Dead)
July 7	Ross Malinger	Voice actor (T.J. Detweiler on Recess (1997–98))
July 8	Alexis Dziena	Actress (Invasion, Entourage)
July 10	Kelly Dowdle	Actress (American Crime Story)
July 10	Aviva Baumann	Actress
July 11	Rachael Taylor	Australian actress (666 Park Avenue, Crisis, Jessica Jones)
July 11	Serinda Swan	Canadian actress (Breakout Kings, Graceland)
July 11	Melanie Papalia	Actress
July 11	Rob Heaps	Actor
July 12	Natalie Martinez	Actress
July 19	Andrea Libman	Canadian voice actress (Madeline, Dragon Tales, My Little Pony: Friendship Is Magic)
July 19	Kaitlin Doubleday	Actress (Empire)
July 20	James Mackay	Australian actor (Dynasty)
July 21	Paloma Guzmán	Actress (Pretty Little Liars, Power Book III: Raising Kanan, Roswell, New Mexico)
July 23	Krysta Rodriguez	Actress
July 24	LaTangela	Actress (Taina)
July 26	Grace Byers	Actress (Empire)
July 27	Taylor Schilling	Actress (Mercy, Orange is the New Black)
July 29	J. Madison Wright Morris	Actress (Earth 2) (d. 2006)
July 29	Todd Bosley	Actor
July 30	Gabrielle Christian	Actress (South of Nowhere)
July 30	Gina Rodriguez	Actress (Jane the Virgin, Carmen Sandiego)
August 1	Valery Ortiz	Actress (South of Nowhere, What About Brian)
August 2	JD Vance	Politician
August 3	Emily Baldoni	Swedish-American actress
August 6	James Holzhauer	American game show contestant
August 7	Joseph Trapanese	American composer
August 10	Ryan Eggold	Actor (90210, The Blacklist)
August 13	Eme Ikwuakor	Actor
August 26	Johnny Ray Gill	Actor
August 27	Amanda Fuller	Actress (Last Man Standing)
August 28	Sarah Roemer	Actress (The Event, Chosen)
August 28	Michael Galeota	Actor (The Jersey) (d. 2016)
September 1	Joe Trohman	American musician (Fall Out Boy)
September 1	Ludwig Göransson	Musician
September 4	Kyle Mooney	Actor and comedian (Saturday Night Live)
September 5	Annabelle Wallis	Actress (Star Trek: Discovery)
September 7	Ben Hollingsworth	Actor
September 13	Baron Corbin	Pro wrestler
September 14	Adam Lamberg	Actor (Lizzie McGuire)
September 16	Sabrina Bryan	Actress, singer (The Cheetah Girls; Dancing with the Stars contestant [2 seasons])
September 18	Nina Arianda	Actress
September 18	Brandon Maxwell	Director
September 19	Kevin Zegers	Canadian actor (Gossip Girl)
September 19	Lydia Hearst	Actress and great-granddaughter of William Randolph Hearst
September 22	Laura Vandervoort	Canadian actress (Instant Star, V, Smallville, Bitten)
September 23	CariDee English	Model and actress (America's Next Top Model)
September 23	Anneliese van der Pol	Actress (That's So Raven, Raven's Home) and singer
September 24	Matt Kemp	American professional baseball outfielder
September 25	Zach Woods	Actor (The Office, Silicon Valley)
September 27	Avril Lavigne	Singer and actress
September 30	T-Pain	Singer and rapper
October 1	Beck Bennett	Actor and comedian (Saturday Night Live)
October 1	Josh Brener	Actor (Glory Daze, The Big Bang Theory, Maron, Silicon Valley, Future-Worm!, Rise of the Teenage Mutant Ninja Turtles)
October 1	Sam Saletta	Actor (7th Heaven, Rocket Power)
October 3	Ashlee Simpson	Actress, singer (7th Heaven, The Ashlee Simpson Show) and sister of Jessica Simpson
October 3	Jessica Parker Kennedy	Actress (Kaya, The Secret Circle, Black Sails)
October 3	Chris Marquette	Actor (Strong Medicine, The Mummy: The Animated Series, Fillmore!, Joan of Arcadia)
October 3	Nick Wright	American sports television personality
October 4	Glenn McMillan	Brazilian actor (Power Rangers Wild Force)
October 4	James Landry Hébert	American actor (1883)
October 4	Nathalie Kelley	Actress
October 11	Martha MacIsaac	Canadian actress (1600 Penn)
October 14	Jason Davis	Voice actor (Mikey Blumberg on Recess) (d. 2020)
October 17	Chris Lowell	Actor (Veronica Mars, Private Practice)
October 23	Meghan McCain	Television personality
October 24	Ben Giroux	Actor (Henry Danger, Bunsen Is a Beast, Danger Force, Big Nate)
October 25	Katy Perry	Singer, songwriter, and actress
October 27	Kelly Osbourne	British singer, actress (The Osbournes, Chelsea Lately, The 7D) and daughter of Ozzy Osbourne
October 27	Emilie Ullerup	Danish-Canadian actress (Sanctuary, Arctic Air)
October 28	Finn Wittrock	Actor (All My Children, American Horror Story)
November 12	Omarion	Actor
November 12	Jorge Masvidal	Mixed martial artist
November 16	Kimberly J. Brown	Actress (Halloweentown, Vampire Princess Miyu, Guiding Light)
November 21	Lindsey Haun	Actress and singer
November 21	Jena Malone	Actress
November 22	Scarlett Johansson	Actress (4-time host of Saturday Night Live)
November 23	Lucas Grabeel	Actor (Halloweentown, High School Musical, Switched at Birth) and voice actor (Family Guy, DreamWorks Dragons, Sheriff Callie's Wild West, Elena of Avalor, Spirit Riding Free, Pinky Malinky)
November 23	Jarah Mariano	Model
November 24	Ulambayaryn Byambajav	Entertainer (d. 2020)
November 25	Gaspard Ulliel	Actor (Moon Knight) (d. 2022)
November 28	Mary Elizabeth Winstead	Actress (Wolf Lake, The Returned, BrainDead, Mercy Street, Fargo)
November 28	Trey Songz	Actor
November 29	Beatrice Rosen	Actress (Cuts, Backstrom)
December 4	Lindsay Felton	Actress (Thunder Alley, Caitlin's Way)
December 10	Tom Hern	New Zealand actor (Power Rangers Dino Thunder)
December 11	Xosha Roquemore	American actress
December 12	Gabrielle Ruiz	American actress
December 14	Jackson Rathbone	American actor
December 15	Kirsty Lee Allan	Australian actress
December 16	Theo James	Actor
December 17	Shannon Woodward	Actress (The Riches, Raising Hope, Westworld)
December 19	Erica O'Keith	Actress (Romeo!)
December 20	Bob Morley	Actor (The 100)
December 22	Greg Finley	Actor (The Secret Life of the American Teenager)
December 25	Miro	Bulgarian-American professional wrestler
December 30	LeBron James	NBA basketball player

== Deaths ==
Date	Name	Age	Notability
February 16	Kenny Williams	69	Game show announcer (The Hollywood Squares, High Rollers, Gambit)
March 1	Jackie Coogan	69	actor (Uncle Fester on The Addams Family)
March 24	Sam Jaffe	93	actor (Dr. Zorba on Ben Casey)
March 31	Caryl Ledner	63	Emmy-winning writer (Mary White)
May 2	Jack Barry	66	game show host/producer (The Joker's Wild)
May 16	Andy Kaufman	35	comedian (Latka Gravas on Taxi)
June 15	Ned Glass	78	actor
August 8	Richard Deacon	63	actor (Fred Rutherford on Leave It to Beaver, Mel Cooley on The Dick Van Dyke Show)
September 17	Richard Basehart	70	actor (Admiral Harriman Nelson on Voyage to the Bottom of the Sea)
September 24	Neil Hamilton	85	actor (Commissioner Gordon on Batman)
October 18	Jon-Erik Hexum	26	actor (gunshot wound from accident on set of TV series Cover Up)
December 7	Jeanne Cagney	65	actress

== See also ==
- 1984 in the United States
- List of American films of 1984
