= Channel 45 =

Channel 45 refers to several television stations:

- DWVN-DTV in Manila, Philippines
- SCTV (Indonesia), Indonesia on Channel 45 UHF in Jakarta territories

== Canada ==
The following television stations formerly broadcast on digital or analog channel 45 (UHF frequencies covering 656-662 MHz) in Canada:

- CFCN-TV-14 in Canmore, Alberta
- CIHF-TV-10 in Yarmouth, Nova Scotia
- CIVC-DT in Trois-Rivières, Quebec
- CJBR-DT in Rimouski, Quebec

The following television stations operate on virtual channel 45 in Canada:

- CIVC-DT in Trois-Rivières, Quebec
- CKES-DT in Edmonton, Alberta

== Mexico ==
The following television stations operate on virtual channel 45 in Mexico:

- XHBJ-TDT in Tijuana, Baja California
- XHHCU-TDT in Mexico City

SPR transmitters that carry XHHCU (Canal del Congreso) place it on virtual channel 45.

== See also ==
- Channel 45 digital TV stations in the United States
- Channel 45 virtual TV stations in the United States
- Channel 45 low-power TV stations in the United States
- Channel 45 branded TV stations in the United States
