= Channel 58 =

Channel 58 refers to several television stations:

== Canada ==
The following television stations operate on virtual channel 58 in Canada:

- CFTF-DT-9 in Gaspé, Quebec

== Mexico ==
The following television stations operate on virtual channel 58 in Mexico:

- XHCAW-TDT in Ciudad Acuña, Coahuila de Zaragoza

== United States ==
The following low-power television station, which is no longer licensed, formerly broadcast on analog channel 58 in the United States:

- KDTP-LP in Phoenix, Arizona

== See also ==
- Channel 58 branded TV stations in the United States
- Channel 58 virtual TV stations in the United States
- Local 58, a YouTube horror anthology web series created by Kris Straub
