= List of Romeo! episodes =

The following is an episode list for the television show Romeo!

== Series overview ==
Season	Episodes	Originally released	
Season	Episodes	First released	Last released
1	20	September 13, 2003	June 26, 2004
2	20	August 28, 2004	May 8, 2005
3	13	April 1, 2006	July 23, 2006

== Episodes ==
=== Season 1 (2003–04) ===
No. overall	No. in season	Title	Directed by	Written by	Original release date	Prod. code	K9–14 viewers (in millions)	K2–11 viewers (in millions)
1	1	"Attack of the Nannies"	Anthony Atkins	Thomas W. Lynch, Master P, & Fracaswell Hyman	September 13, 2003	100	N/A	N/A
Romeo and Louis sneak into a radio station to get some airtime for their band's song. Meanwhile, the kids scare off another nanny, so Percy tries to find another one. After having trouble finding one, Mrs. Rogers suddenly shows up and is hired.
2	2	"He Got Blame"	Fracaswell Hyman	Jonas E. Agin	September 20, 2003	107	1.16	N/A
Romeo joins Louis's team for a big video game competition. When other two other members of the team realize they won't be able to win with Louis on the team, Romeo has a tough decision to make: his brother or the championship. Meanwhile, Jodi and Mrs. Rogers sign up for a charity race.
3	3	"Let's Make a Deal"	Anthony Atkins	Thomas W. Lynch	September 20, 2003	109	1.06	N/A
Romeo and Louis send $100 to "Jive Hive Enterprises", who promise to play their song on the radio within 48 hours. But when they realize it's a scam, they need to get the money back, which they got from selling their bikes, before the family bike ride with Percy. Meanwhile, Percy sets out to fix all the problems in the house.
4	4	"Minimum Cool"	Adam Weissman	Rodney Stringfellow	September 27, 2003	106	0.98	1.65
Romeo and Louis get hassled by a bully named Booker (Nolan Funk) after performing at school. When Jodi sees the bully messing with her brothers she comes and helps them, and makes fun of the bully. So to get his reputation back, the bully asks for a favor: a date with Jodi. Meanwhile, Jodi makes fun of Gary for being short and he quits the group.
5	5	"Slam Dunk"	Adam Weissman	Thomas W. Lynch	September 27, 2003	101	0.92	N/A
Romeo tries to impress a girl, but when he messes up and thinks he has lost his mojo, his father tells him he should simply introduce himself to her. However, Romeo, determined to give his method another chance, pays no mind to his father's advice. So he takes matters into his own hands and makes an even bigger fool of himself trying to impress her. In another story, Mr. Miller tries to kill a mouse running around in the house, but Gary and Mrs. Rogers want to catch it and release it outside.
6	6	"Man of the Hizzouse"	Chip Hurd	Stephen Langford	October 4, 2003	108	N/A	N/A
Romeo experiences what life is like for Percy when he acts as the man of the house for one hectic day, which includes balancing the pressures of work with his responsibilities as caregiver to four demanding kids. Meanwhile, Mrs. Rogers is desperate to repair her broken-down circus car, which she calls "Betty."
7	7	"Yugs, Not Thugs"	Adam Weissman	Ken Kwok	October 11, 2003	110	N/A	N/A
Louis gets accepted to be a Young Upstanding Gentlemen (YUG) and starts snitching on everyone in the house since that's the YUG way. To get back at him, Romeo, Jodi, and Gary pull a number of pranks on him. Meanwhile, Mrs. Rogers's old circus buddies come to town to visit her.
8	8	"The Faking of the President"	Fracaswell Hyman	Fracaswell Hyman	November 1, 2003	113	1.13	1.94
Louis runs to be school president but doesn't win, and he finds out someone nominated Romeo to be president. Romeo and Louis find out it was Myra! But when Romeo actually wins, he doesn't want to resign for presidency because of all the perks, even after he promised to step down. Meanwhile, Gary and Jodi plan Mrs. Rogers a surprise party, but the surprise is on them when Mrs. Rogers tells them something unexpected.
9	9	"Da New Hotness"	Pat Williams	Fracsawell Hyman	November 15, 2003	103	N/A	N/A
Romeo has some competition from the new boy at school. Meanwhile, Percy has trouble accepting Jodi's new boyfriend.
10	10	"A Little So'em So'em for Christmas"	Ron Oliver	Thomas W. Lynch	December 10, 2003	116	N/A	N/A
It's shaping up to be a blue Christmas in the Miller household, with Percy unable to catch a flight home, while Romeo and Louis are sweating his arrival because Gary inadvertently donated to the River Creek House (where Louis lived for a year until he was adopted by the Millers) their dad's most prized possession: the watch his wife gave him before she died, which Romeo and Louis intended to give their father for Christmas. Meanwhile, Mrs. Rogers can't find her Christmas spirit away from the circus.
11	11	"Playin' Favorites"	Anthony Atkins	Jim Hecht	April 10, 2004	105	0.94	N/A
After Mrs. Rogers accidentally wins a contest to meet the Rock, Romeo and Jodi compete to be her guest. Meanwhile, Gary tries to impress the young sister of Louis's friend while trying to understand his feelings about her.
12	12	"The April Fools"	Fracaswell Hyman	Nina Bargiel & Jeremy Bargiel	April 17, 2004	117	N/A	N/A
Romeo and Louis' attempt to become the school's number one prankster backfires when they accidentally destroy a precious school trophy. Myra uses her evidence-collecting abilities to find the vandals, and when she discovers it was Romeo, she blackmails him into being her boyfriend. Meanwhile, Mrs. Rogers attempts to prove herself able to cornrow Gary's hair, despite her race.
13	13	"Water, Water, Everywhere!"	Adam Weissman	Fracaswell Hyman	April 24, 2004	104	0.80	N/A
Romeo discovers that Gary's swim coach is related to a famous record producer, so he and Louis hesitantly try out for the swim team in an attempt to hustle a connection for the band. The only problem is that Romeo can't swim! Louis' tryout efforts gain him a spot on the team, and the coach offers Romeo an irresistible deal – if he takes lessons from her, she will present their band's demo to her uncle, the record producer. Will a record deal help him overcome his fear? Meanwhile, Mrs. Rogers goes on a spending spree, using Percy's money to buy useless household gadgets, and Jodi must utilize her recently obtained knowledge of Psychology 101 to figure out why.
14	14	"Write Me A Hit"	Anthony Atkins	Thomas W. Lynch	May 1, 2004	102	0.94	2.01
Rather than write his book report, Romeo tries to snag a gig at rich girl Sable Fox's Sweet 13 party. He figures a way out of his dilemma by enlisting Myra to write his report for him, but his scheme backfires when Myra gets jealous of the attention Sable's receiving from Ro. Meanwhile, Percy thinks the kids are spending too much money, so Mrs. Rogers gives Jodi driving lessons.
15	15	"Your Cheatin' Heart"	Anthony Atkins	Gregg McBride	May 8, 2004	114	1.02	2.11
Romeo and Louis attempt to expose Jodi's new baseball-playing boyfriend Jason (J-Way) James (Kaj-Erik Eriksen) for the cheat they know he is, but it takes calling up all his girlfriends to do so. Meanwhile, Mrs. Rogers helps Gary find the perfect science experiment to win a blue ribbon at school.
16	16	"Hip-Ro-Tize"	Ron Oliver	Keith Fay	May 15, 2004	115	N/A	N/A
Romeo tries to learn hypnosis so he can hypnotize Percy. Accidentally, he hypnotizes Mrs. Rogers into thinking she's a dog and causes a big riot at the park. Meanwhile, Jodi is having trouble making her sculpture for her art class.
17	17	"Right Place/Wrong Rhyme"	Anthony Atkins	Fracaswell Hyman	May 22, 2004	111	0.93	N/A
Jodi becomes a model and quits the group. Romeo and Louis search for a new lead singer. They go through a lot of people, but then find Myra. Myra is unhappy with the song Romeo picks for the contest they are performing for, and Romeo quits unless the band will play his song. Meanwhile Jodi's manager is too happy with himself and doesn't treat Jodi with respect.
18	18	"Field Trippin'"	Adam Weissman	Nina Bargiel & Jeremy Bargiel	June 5, 2004	112	N/A	N/A
Romeo and Gary discover that their favorite pro wrestling star, Insane Johnny Blame, is in town to accept an award. The boys slip away from a class field trip and sneak into Johnny's hotel room in an attempt to meet their idol. The wrestler goes ballistic when he finds them in his room and, in the ensuing chaos, the boys accidentally break his award. Ro and Gary manage to escape, but are stunned to learn that Percy has brought Johnny home for dinner. Also, Louis helps Jodi get ready for a date.
19	19	"Oh What a Tangled Website We Weave"	Adam Weissman	Jonas E. Agin	June 12, 2004	118	N/A	N/A
Myra creates a web page for the band, however as things don't go each of their way things backfire. Meanwhile, Mrs. Rogers becomes a pet psychic.
20	20	"Friends and Lovers"	Adam Weissman	Thomas W. Lynch	June 26, 2004	119	N/A	N/A
Romeo has trouble getting a date for the school dance because of Myra; Percy's brother Bubba comes to visit, so the Miller family has to be out on alert because every time "Bubba" visits it means at least a week of bad luck. Guest Star: Nicole LaPlaca (as Punk Girl)

=== Season 2 (2004–05) ===
No. overall	No. in season	Title	Directed by	Written by	Original release date	Prod. code	K9–14 viewers (in millions)	K2–11 viewers (in millions)
21	1	"When the Cat's Away"	Chip Hurd	Thomas W. Lynch	August 28, 2004	201	N/A	N/A
After failing an algebra test, Romeo gets the opportunity to re-take it. He enlists Gary's help in helping distract Percy's new girlfriend, Angie, so he can watch a basketball game with his friends on TV instead of studying for the re-take. Meanwhile, Jodi visits a college fair to widen her choices, all turned down by Percy for unorthodox reasons.
22	2	"A Matter of Principal"	Anthony Atkins	Jonas E. Agin	August 29, 2004	202	N/A	N/A
Romeo is now a freshman at high school but his first impression on the school principal is not a good one. Romeo has been accused of paintballing the principal's house, even though he left before his friends actually did it. But if Romeo tells who really did it, they promise to make his life miserable. Louis is having problems of his own when he wants to be a writer on the school's newspaper, but the head editor is not very nice, and took Louis's piece on the cafeteria and re-wrote it. Louis gave up and decided to make his own "Zine" with the help of Myra.
23	3	"Rules of Engagement"	Mina Shum	Matt Dearborn	September 12, 2004	203	1.28	N/A
Percy decides to propose to Angeline but is worried that Angeline will turn him down. Percy asks the kids to help him out by keeping the house super clean for Angeline's visit for dinner where Percy will pop the question. Percy decides to hide the ring in the dessert for the ultimate surprise. However a few mishaps occur when the kids are trying to clean the house and when the ring goes missing, the Pizza boy is the first suspect of stealing it. Jodi and Louis go out to find him, but while they're gone, Percy gets stricken by the scared sickness and hides in the bathroom. After all this Percy finally asks Angeline to marry him.
24	4	"Pinhead"	Chip Hurd	Jim Hecht	September 18, 2004	204	0.98	N/A
Romeo is asked to join the school's bowling team, but when everyone at school makes fun of them, he has other opinions about joining, while Louis takes credit for Myra's ceramics project.
25	5	"If I Had a Hacksaw"	Anthony Atkins	James Stoteraux & Chad Fiveash	October 9, 2004	205	N/A	N/A
The band signs with their first manager, and Gary wins a car on a radio contest.
26	6	"Speechless in Seattle"	Chip Hurd	Keith Fay	October 16, 2004	206	0.89	N/A
Romeo falls for a girl in his drama class, and Gary starts a paper route business.
27	7	"Nothin' But Net"	Ron Oliver	Jim Kramer	October 23, 2004	211	N/A	N/A
Romeo makes the varsity basketball team, and Gary decides to have a garage sale to earn some money.
28	8	"Hack Came, Hacksaw, Hack Conquered"	Ron Oliver	Rick Groel	November 13, 2004	208	1.01	N/A
Hacksaw approaches Pieces with a two-year contract, while Gary is cast in a commercial.
29	9	"Tag Along"	George Mendeluk	Matt Dearborn & Jonas E. Agin	November 28, 2004	214	N/A	N/A
Gary emulates Romeo's dress and behavior, while Louis consults a Web site for style tips.
30	10	"Rap Off"	Fracaswell Hyman	Thomas W. Lynch	December 5, 2004	212	1.06	N/A
Romeo lies to the family in order to compete solo in a rap-off, and things go wrong when Pieces think he's quitting the band. Meanwhile, Louis tries to set a new world record. Guest star: Fan 3
31	11	"My Blues Brother"	Fracaswell Hyman	Thomas W. Lynch	January 2, 2005	210	1.34	1.85
Romeo learns that his new crush, Peyton, is in Louis' fencing club. Meanwhile, Gary hides in the backseat when Jodi sneaks out with a date.
32	12	"Blowing Up"	Chip Hurd	Thomas W. Lynch	January 23, 2005	219	1.36	N/A
Hacksaw gets the band a gig at The Place, a big venue, and decides that it's time to enter phase two of their career. He brings in backup dancers and a choreographer for Jodi, a former rock keyboardist for Louis and sets up press for Romeo. With all of the extra work and time that phase two requires, the kids are burning out and each begin to believe that they should be the star of the group. Ro uses a TV interview to bring the band back together to where they should be – enjoying themselves and remembering that first and foremost, they're a family.
33	13	"Good Press"	Adam Weissman	Matt Dearborn & Jonas E. Agin	January 30, 2005	216	1.58	N/A
Romeo denies having a girlfriend in a radio interview, while Jodi borrows an outfit from Angeline without asking.
34	14	"Art of Deception"	Chip Hurd	Thomas W. Lynch	February 20, 2005	217	N/A	N/A
Angeline is working on an art exhibit with Ponce, a neurotic artist. When the tube containing the band's poster gets mistaken for Angeline's blueprints, Romeo makes the exchange at the museum but accidentally damages Ponce's piece. Not wanting to bother Ang when she's so stressed, Ro, Myra and Louis don disguises, use Angeline's ID, and sneak into the museum to fix the piece. Jodi agrees to baby-sit Marco Fishwick (Gary's former employee), even though Gary doesn't like him. After Jodi encourages Gary to play with Marco and give him another chance, Gary learns that there is more to Marco than he first realized.
35	15	"Loose Lips"	Anthony Atkins	Fracaswell Hyman	March 13, 2005	207	1.40	1.86
A boy at Romeo's school, Ferug, looks up to Romeo and wants advice on how to get a date with his crush, Penny Sanders.
36	16	"Hits and Misses"	Ron Oliver	Tom Burkhard	March 27, 2005	209	N/A	N/A
Romeo pretends to be a bat-boy for the Seattle Jackrabbits in order to meet his idol, New York Yankees outfielder Darius Crippen, but is disappointed when he meets him.
37	17	"Peyton's Place"	Pat Williams	Thomas W. Lynch	April 10, 2005	213	0.89	N/A
Romeo and Peyton break up when Peyton's dad, Mr. Cruz, forbids them to see each other because Romeo's a rapper. After Mr. Cruz catches Peyton and Ro skipping school together, he tells Romeo to stay away from his daughter. But now in order for Romeo to stay with Peyton, he must win over her father.
38	18	"Who Let the Dogs Out"	Anthony Atkins	Danny Warren & Joshua Lynn	April 17, 2005	218	1.56	N/A
Romeo asks Riley to baby-sit Gary while he sneaks out to the fair with Peyton. On his way home, Romeo finds a lost dog and puts it in his backpack. Angeline suspects something's up when she gets home so Riley pretends the dog is his. When Riley claims the reward for the dog and gains notoriety, it's up to Ro and Riley to keep the truth from reporter Myra. Ro is tired of lying and full of guilt, confesses what happened to Angeline. Jodi gets a tattoo at the fair on impulse, but later regrets it. When Angeline and Jodi go back to the tattoo artist to remove the tattoo, they find out that it wasn't even real.
39	19	"Louis ... Miller"	Chip Hurd	Fracaswell Hyman	May 1, 2005	215	1.15	N/A
Louis's only family, his aunt and his cousin Ryan, come for a visit. Romeo is jealous of Ryan's constant speak of how popular he is, and how he's going to Hollywood. His jealousy keeps increasing, that is, until he finds out Ryan is a Grade A liar. He tries to tell Louis, who in turn tells Romeo he knows but he doesn't care. Romeo decides that Louis needs a real family. Meanwhile, Gary joins the boy scouts.
40	20	"Choices"	Fracaswell Hyman	Thomas W. Lynch	May 8, 2005	220	0.89	N/A
Romeo's basketball team makes it to the finals. With the increased team practices and band rehearsals, Ro decides to make a minute-by-minute schedule of his life. As a result, he ends up falling behind in everything. Ro decides that something has to give and chooses to quit the team. He later explodes at his band members because he's trying to be the best he could be, and it feels like no one is on his side helping him out. Off their guilt, Jodi and Lou get Ro back on the team. The family has learned the importance of sacrifice and compromise while Ro learned that it's okay to ask for help. Angeline's niece Stormy comes to visit. Every time she's around Gary, Gary winds up getting hurt, leading him to believe that Stormy is jinxed. Lou overhears some odd phone conversations that Ang is having with a doctor, and in the end, the family learns that she's pregnant. Percy and crew are ecstatic for their new family member to arrive. Guest star: Alejandro Abellan as Coach Quintero

=== Season 3 (2006) ===
No. overall	No. in season	Title	Directed by	Written by	Original release date	Prod. code	K9–14 viewers (in millions)
41	1	"Driving Me Crazy"	Fracaswell Hyman	Thomas W. Lynch	April 1, 2006	301	1.17
The streets are a little less safe, Romeo gets his driver's license! Good thing too, as he needs to drive to a church to meet the band's potential new singer, Ashley. With Jodi off to college, The Romeo Show needs a replacement for her. Ashley would be perfect – she's beautiful and has an amazing voice – but she's not interested in joining Ro's band. On the way to see Ashley, trouble ensues when Romeo and Riley wreck Gary's car. Fortunately, they convince someone to fix it cheaply – and he pimps it out, too. When they finally get to the church to hear Ashley sing, Romeo uses his smooth-talking ways and convinces her to join the band for their new weekly gig at Club Scrape.
42	2	"The Razor's Edge"	Adam Weissman	Josh Lynn	April 9, 2006	302	N/A
While at the go-cart track with Romeo, Riley spots a girl (Lainey) from school he has a little crush on. Ro convinces Riley to go talk to her and they hit it off. Unfortunately for Ro, Riley falls head over heels for her and totally changes his personality. He has no time for Romeo and takes up yoga and health foods. Romeo feels like he lost his best friend. After Lainey dumps him, Riley realizes he's been a bad friend and apologizes to Romeo. Note: This episode aired on Nickelodeon with new premieres of Zoey 101 ("People Auction") and Just for Kicks ("Meet the Power Strikers").
43	3	"Fraternity Ro"	Anthony Atkins	Jonas E. Agin	April 23, 2006	303	N/A
Jodi books the band for a frat house gig on campus. Everyone in the band is excited except Romeo. Romeo hasn't told Jodi that Ashley has replaced her in the band, and when the band arrives to rehearse on campus, the two girls lash out at Ro for not mentioning each other and storm off. Ro and Ashley patch things up right away, but Jodi refuses to forgive Romeo. Only when Jodi sees a video Louis made, showing Romeo emphasizing how great Jodi is, does she decide to forgive him. Jodi realizes that the reason Romeo didn't tell her about Ashley is because he is having a hard time accepting the fact that she moved out and is away at school.
44	4	"Baby on Board!"	Fracaswell Hyman	Thomas W. Lynch	May 7, 2006	304	1.12
With Angeline's labor imminent and Percy out of town on a business trip, Romeo is in charge. Romeo sets up a "baby drill" where everyone practices getting Angeline to the hospital quickly. The whole family performs superbly. Of course when the real thing happens, everyone panics and forgets their duties. When Romeo gets lost on the way to the hospital and the car gets a flat tire, the family ends up just barely arriving on time. When complications arise in the delivery, Romeo blames himself. Percy arrives and convinces Romeo that he did a great job acting as the man of the house. We end with the family holding the new Miller baby.
45	5	"The Mrs. Landers Incident"	Matthew Hastings	Darry Warrel & Rick Groel	May 14, 2006	311	N/A
A new student, Stacy-Marie, has moved to Romeo's school and joined his class. Stacy-Marie seems to spend most of her time correcting Romeo in everything from his class work to his basketball game, leading him to see her as an annoying know-it-all. To make things worse, Romeo gets detention from Mrs. Landers after he's caught calling Stacy a suck-up during class. Trying to make Ro feel better, Louis makes Romeo a photo-shopped picture of Mrs. Landers as a witch. Romeo, in turn, attempts to e-mail the image to Jodi as a joke, but accidentally emails it to Mrs. Landers instead. At Ro's insistence, Louis attempts to hack into the school's computer system and delete the e-mail before Mrs. Landers sees it, but Louis is unable to get in. Louis tells Romeo there is only one person who can accomplish the task, Stacy-Marie, the computer expert. In his attempt to convince Stacy-Marie to help him out, Romeo gets to know her a little better and realizes that he misjudged her. The two finally become friends as Ro heads for detention.
46	6	"The Tipping Point"	Pat Williams	Nina Bargiel & Matt Dearborn	May 21, 2006	305	N/A
After a performance, a goofy looking guy named Omar comes up to Ashley and Ro at the club and reveals that he is Ashley's boyfriend. Romeo can't believe it – he's never heard her mention having a boyfriend. What else is she hiding from him? Later, she admits that she's been thinking about ending it with Omar because she has started to have feelings for Romeo. Romeo convinces Ashley to be honest with Omar and break it off now if she doesn't think they are right for each other. Meanwhile, Club Scrape is having a '70s style disco dance contest with the winner getting $500. Ashley convinces Ro to accompany her to the dance. When Omar shows up with a beautiful girl on his arm, Romeo sees Ashley's reaction and realizes that Ashley still has feelings for Omar. He convinces Ashley that they wouldn't make a good couple and patches things up between her and Omar.
47	7	"The Shot-put Heard ‘Round the World"	Carl Goldstein	Abraham Alfonso Brown	June 4, 2006	307	N/A
Much to everyone's amazement, Louis breaks the school record for shot-put. Romeo couldn't be prouder of his brother. People begin to question how he did it and Romeo has to defend his brother. Romeo becomes suspicious after Louis tries to downplay his accomplishment during dinner with the family. Later, Romeo learns that Louis cheated when he finds a shot-put in their room that weighs less than a pound. Lou convinces Ro that he didn't mean to cheat and thinks everyone will forget about it by tomorrow. When Stanley, the previous record holder confronts Romeo, he tells him that Louis will prove he broke your record fair and square. They decide to have a “Put off.” Romeo takes the roll of Lou's trainer and makes him believe in himself. Although Stanley kills Louis in the contest, Louis and Romeo are ecstatic because Louis broke his own record for personal best – this time, for real.
48	8	"The Price of Fame"	George Mendeluk	Bernadette Luckett	June 11, 2006	304	N/A
A guy who works for the Seattle Music Beat Magazine, Hal Campo, starts to follow Romeo around and take his picture. Romeo doesn't know why he keeps taking his picture. Hal offers Riley money to give him info on Romeo. Romeo can't take it anymore and wants his privacy. Riley and Romeo then come up with a plan with Louis and Myras's help to get Hal to leave Romeo alone. They tell Hal Romeo joined a boy band called Bassline. They tell him where Romeo and his band are but it is really an alien party. After Hal fails to get in, Romeo, Louis, Myra, and Riley call and tell him it was an alien party and he is in Mars.
49	9	"Double Dating"	Adam Weissman	Jonas E. Agin	June 18, 2006	310	N/A
Romeo has turned on the charm a little too much. He's got two different dates for the same night. After sinking a big three-pointer to win the school basketball game, a cheerleader named Pamela becomes interested in Romeo. But Ro has his eye on a shy girl from one of his classes named Jessica. Pamela, popular and a little pushy, convinces Romeo to take her out on the same night he already has a date scheduled with Jessica. With the help of Louis, Romeo manages to make it through both dates, but he learns that two girls are too much to handle and finally decides to come clean with both of them. Angeline's estranged sister, Olivia, arrives out of nowhere and takes up residence at the Miller household. While Jodi and Gary are taken in by Olivia, Angeline is steadily losing patience with her sister's made-up stories and adolescent behavior.
50	10	"Sell Out"	Adam Weissman	Abraham Alfonso Brown	June 25, 2006	308	N/A
Romeo and Louis take a career test. Romeo's results say his career is in car sales. Romeo knows his real passion is music. Louis feels upset when his results say he is not inclined to do anything. Meanwhile, Angeline has not gotten any sleep because of Bobby so Jodi agrees to take care of him for her. Bobby still won't stop crying until Louis holds him. Louis then discovers he has the magic touch.
51	11	"Tee'd Off"	Adam Weissman	Fracaswell Hyman & Thomas W. Lynch	July 9, 2006	309	N/A
Romeo tries to meet a record producer on the golf course. Gary doesn't like a boy that Jodi brings home.
52	12	"Ro' Trip"	Pat Williams	Thomas W. Lynch	July 23, 2006	312	N/A
53	13	"Ro' Trip"	Pat Williams	Thomas W. Lynch	July 23, 2006	313	N/A
Romeo, Louis and Gary go on an adventure-filled road trip to Los Angeles, where the boys receive news of a potentially career-making gig, but there's a catch. Guest star: JoJo
