= Channel 45 low-power TV stations in the United States =

The following low-power television stations broadcast on digital or analog channel 45 in the United States:

- K45KS-D in Billings, Montana, to move to channel 19
- W45DN-D in Washington, D.C., to move to channel 10

The following stations, which are no longer licensed, formerly broadcast on digital or analog channel 45:

- K45AC in Wenatchee, Washington
- K45AF-D in Parachute, etc., Colorado
- K45AG in Duchesne, Utah
- K45AH in Ukiah, California
- K45AU-D in Follett, Texas
- K45CU in Shiprock, New Mexico
- K45DD in Eureka, Utah
- K45DS-D in Freshwater, etc., California
- K45DY-D in New Mobeetie, Texas
- K45EB in Bozeman, Montana
- K45EJ in Enid, Oklahoma
- K45FW in Price, etc., Utah
- K45FZ in Lewiston, Idaho
- K45GD-D in Romeo, etc., Colorado
- K45GP in Emery, Utah
- K45HW in San Angelo, Texas
- K45IA-D in Rock Springs, Wyoming
- K45IY in Alexandria, Louisiana
- K45JC in Huntsville, Utah
- K45KT-D in Sargents, Colorado
- K45KX-D in Weed, California
- KAZP-LP in Port Arthur, Texas
- KCDR-LD in Cedar Rapids, Iowa
- KCGI-CA in Cape Girardeau, Missouri
- KCTF-LP in Twin Falls, Idaho
- KHDT-LP in Denver, Colorado
- KHPB-CD in Bastrop, Texas
- KJKC-LP in Tonopah, Nevada
- KKRR-LP in Cheyenne, Wyoming
- KLHU-CD in Lake Havasu City, Arizona
- KMDK-LD in Jonesboro, Arkansas
- KWVF-LP in Pinedale, Wyoming
- KWWB-LP in Mesquite, etc., Nevada
- W45CU in Waycross, Georgia
- W45DI-D in Juana Diaz, Puerto Rico
- W45DJ-D in Panama City, Florida
- W45ED-D in Clarksdale, Mississippi
- WJOS-LD in Pomeroy, Ohio
- WMUN-CD in Mineola, New York
- WVVK-LP in Martin, Kentucky
