= What About Mimi? =

Canadian animated television series

- Genre: Animated sitcom
- Created by: Chris Bartleman; Blair Peters
- Developed by: Ian Weir; Colleen Holub
- Directed by: Josh Mepham (Note: Credited on all episodes of season 1 as such, credited on separate episodes for seasons 2 and 3.); Colleen Holub
- Voices of: Chiara Zanni; Kori Cook; Rhys Huber; Carly McKillip; Tony Sampson; Andrew Francis; Keith Miller; Sam Vincent; Ellen Kennedy; Colin Murdock; Peter Kelamis; Saffron Henderson; Garry Chalk; Dale Wilson; Noel Callahan; Tabitha St. Germain
- Theme music composer: Sarita Baker
- Composers: Sarita Baker; Hal Foxton Beckett
- Country of origin: Canada
- Original language: English
- No. of seasons: 3
- No. of episodes: 39 (52 segments)

Production
- Executive producers: Chris Bartleman; Blair Peters; Steven DeNure
- Producers: Chris Bartleman; Blair Peters
- Running time: 22 minutes
- Production companies: Decode Entertainment; Studio B Productions

Original release
- Network: Teletoon
- Release: October 4, 2000 – August 14, 2002

What About Mimi? is a Canadian animated children's television sitcom created by Chris Bartleman and Blair Peters. The show was produced by Decode Entertainment and Studio B Productions. The show was first premiered on Teletoon on October 4, 2000 with the final episode airing on August 14, 2002, leading up to three seasons and 39 episodes overall.

== Plot ==
The show that focuses on Mimi Mortin, a clever, redheaded girl in the sixth grade who lives in the Canadian town of Starfish Bay with two friends, Elaine and Russell, her family, and her rival Sincerity.

== Characters ==
- Miriam "Mimi" Mortin (voiced by Chiara Zanni) - A young, freckle-faced girl in the sixth grade. She is 11 years old. She is clever, optimistic, and has a powerful imagination. She is always willing to help and solve any problem that she may encounter all the time, adding with creative plans and ideas. Although her plans may not always work out the way she expects them, Mimi receives a lot of help from her best friends (Elaine and Russell), her family, so even her rivals (Sincerity), and finds a way to solve any problem. She has a pet cat named Wimbledon.
- Elaine Pituskin (voiced by Kori Cook) - Mimi's best friend. She is an 11-year-old girl who is an animal and nature lover, owning many pets. She can be temperamental and argue with Mimi at times, but she always looks up to Mimi as her best friend, in turn, Mimi respects her a lot.
- Russell Van Eden (voiced by Rhys Huber in Seasons 1-2 and Noel Callahan in Season 3) - Mimi's other best friend and male sidekick. He is an 11-year-old boy who is a sports lover, although he is a little clumsy. He has video camera skills and aspires to be a film director. He is shown to have a crush on Sincerity early in the show, but his interest on her later fades away.
- Sincerity Travers (voiced by Carly McKillip) - A snobbish preppy girl with dyed pink hair who, most of the time, does not get along with Mimi. She and Mimi used to be friends in kindergarten, but as they got older, their interests diverged, and they started growing apart. She is Mimi's rival at school, and although she does not get along with her, she has a resentful respect for her, admitting that her ideas are very good and helping with some of her schemes (implying that deep inside, Sincerity still considers her a true friend). She has a father named Lance.
- Brock Wickersham (voiced by Tony Sampson) - A bully who enjoys pulling pranks on all of the characters, especially on Herbert Finkle.
- Budrick "Buddy" Wickersham (voiced by Andrew Francis) - Brock's younger brother who is also a bully. It is also revealed that he is a genius, but he does not want people to find out about it, especially his big brother, explaining that the fact would embarrass him in front of his family.
- Bradley "Brad" Mortin (voiced by Keith Miller) - Mimi's 9-year-old brother who knows that Mimi's plans always have flaws.
- Jason Mortin (voiced by Sam Vincent) - Mimi's older brother who thinks of himself as an on-the-edge rebel.
- Saffron Mortin (voiced by Ellen Kennedy) - Mimi's vegan mother who always feeds her children vegetables.
- Marvin "Marv" Mortin (voiced by Colin Murdock) - Mimi's father, who is also a hippie.
- Hayley Kinaschuk (voiced by Ellen Kennedy) - Sincerity's best friend and "lackey" - although she is kind and many times disagrees with Sincerity, and is good friends with Mimi, Elaine and Russell. She is of Russian heritage.
- Herbert Finkle (voiced by Peter Kelamis) - A nerd at Mimi's school. He is in charge of the school's newspaper. He's also often the target of Brock and Buddy's pranks.
- Lodeman (voiced by Peter Kelamis) - A student at Mimi's school who tends to make very bad noises and act distracted all the time.
- Ms. Grindstone (voiced by Saffron Henderson) - Mimi's main teacher at school.
- Mr. Petri (voiced by Sam Vincent) - A science teacher who blames Brock for everything bad (even over things Brock never did) because of his state of being a bully and for pulling all pranks at his classroom.
- Mr. Jacques (voiced by Dale Wilson) - A gym teacher at school.
- Ms. Murchison (voiced by Tabitha St. Germain) - The librarian of Starfish Bay School. She and Mr. Pianoforte hate each other.
- Principal Earl (voiced by Garry Chalk) - The principal of Starfish Bay School.
- Mr. Pianoforte (voiced by TBA) - A music teacher at school. He and Ms. Murchison hate each other.

== Episodes ==
The show consists of 39 half-hour episodes divided into three seasons. The first two seasons consist of 13 episodes with a full 22-minute story each, while the third season consists of 13 episodes divided into 26 11-minute stories.

=== Series overview ===
Season	Episodes	Originally released	
Season	Episodes	First released	Last released
1	13	October 4, 2000	January 10, 2001
2	13	March 7, 2001	July 1, 2001
3	13	April 10, 2002	August 14, 2002

=== Season 1 (2000–01) ===
In this season, all episodes are simultaneously directed by Josh Mepham and Colleen Holub. They became separate episodic directors by the next season.

No. overall	No. in season	Title	Written by	Storyboarded by	Original release date
1	1	"Second Honeymoon"	Ian Weir	Sam To	October 4, 2000
2	2	"The Great Campaign"	Susin Nielsen	Luisito Escauriaga	October 11, 2000
3	3	"The Stepford Twins"	Susin Nielsen	Jordan Oliwa	October 18, 2000
4	4	"Leapfrog"	Susin Nielsen	Jason Horychun & Lyn Hart	October 25, 2000
5	5	"The Play's the Thing"	Alan Levin	Karen Lloyd	November 1, 2000
6	6	"Into the Woods"	Beth Stewart	Jorden Oliwa	November 8, 2000
7	7	"Wildthing"	Peter Lapres	Sam To	November 15, 2000
8	8	"Lemonade Kid"	Alan Levin	Luisito Escauriaga	November 22, 2000
9	9	"The King of Uncool"	Beth Stewart	Stan Gadziola & Marlon Deane	December 13, 2000
10	10	"Summer in the City"	Ian Weir	Jason Horychun	December 20, 2000
11	11	"Poster Cat"	Victor Nicolle	Marlon Deane	December 27, 2000
12	12	"Teacher of the Year"	Deborah Peraya	Luisito Escauriaga	January 3, 2001
13	13	"A Star Isn't Born"	Susin Nielsen	Karen Lloyd	January 10, 2001

=== Season 2 (2001) ===
No. overall	No. in season	Title	Directed by	Written by	Storyboarded by	Original release date
14	1	"Lights, Camera, Action"	Colleen Holub	Susin Nielsen	Jason Horychun	March 7, 2001
15	2	"Jokers Wild"	Josh Mepham	Susin Nielsen	Karen Lloyd	March 11, 2001
16	3	"Jellyfish Rule"	Colleen Holub	Elizabeth Stewart	Louie Escauriaga & Don Boone	March 18, 2001
17	4	"Get a Job"	Josh Mepham	Cathy Moss	Trent Larson	March 25, 2001
18	5	"Cupid's Arrows"	Colleen Holub	Susin Nielsen	Marlon Deane	April 1, 2001
19	6	"The Scoop"	Josh Mepham	Victor Nicolle	Marvin Estropia	April 8, 2001
20	7	"High Toon"	Colleen Holub	Elizabeth Stewart	Jeff Barker, Sam To & Jason Horychun	April 15, 2001
21	8	"Deep Sea Mimi"	Josh Mepham	Victor Nicolle	Don Boone & Karen Lloyd	April 22, 2001
22	9	"Mr. Blue Eyes"	Colleen Holub	Victor Nicolle	Eduardo Soriano, Luisito Escauriaga & Deiter Mueller	April 29, 2001
23	10	"Outta Sync"	Josh Mepham	Elizabeth Stewart	John Delaney	May 6, 2001
24	11	"Museum Mayhem"	Colleen Holub	Peter Lapres	Marlon Deane, Sherwin Macario & Eduardo Soriano	May 13, 2001
25	12	"The Big Sleep Over"	Josh Mepham	Cathy Moss	Marlon Deane, Sherwin Macario & Eduardo Soriano	June 30, 2001
26	13	"Skiing is Believing"	Colleen Holub	Victor Nicolle	Jason Horychun, Marvin Estropia & Lyn Hart	July 1, 2001

=== Season 3 (2002) ===
No. overall	No. in season	Title	Directed by	Written by	Storyboarded by	Original release date
27	1	"Animal House"	Colleen Holub	Victor Nicolle	Sherwin Macario	April 10, 2002
27	1	"Our Little Einstein"	Josh Mepham	Elizabeth Stewart	Don Boone	April 10, 2002
28	2	"The Birthday Present"	Colleen Holub	Susin Nielsen	Dennis Crawford	April 14, 2002
28	2	"Close Encounters of the Herbert Kind"	Josh Mepham	Cathy Moss	Jordan Oliwa	April 14, 2002
29	3	"Sticky Fingers"	Colleen Holub	Elizabeth Stewart	John Delaney	April 17, 2002
29	3	"Not in My Biosphere"	Josh Mepham	Victor Nicolle	Jason Surridge	April 17, 2002
30	4	"Miss Lonely Hearts"	Colleen Holub	Cathy Moss	Maurice Sherwood	April 24, 2002
30	4	"Brock's Robot"	Josh Mepham	Louise Moon	Jason Horychun	April 24, 2002
31	5	"Club Mimi"	Josh Mepham	Peter Lapres	Sherwin Macario	May 1, 2002
31	5	"Down on the Farm"	Colleen Holub	Elizabeth Stewart	Don Boone	May 1, 2002
32	6	"Forget Etiquette"	Josh Mepham	Victor Nicolle	Dennis Crawford	May 8, 2002
32	6	"This Old House"	Colleen Holub	Leslie Mildiner	Jorden Oliwa	May 8, 2002
33	7	"Iron Guy"	Josh Mepham	Sara Snow	John Delaney	May 15, 2002
33	7	"Critics Choice"	Colleen Holub	Victor Nicolle	Luisito Escauriaga	May 15, 2002
34	8	"My Fair Brocky"	Colleen Holub	Louise Moon	Maurice Sherwood	May 22, 2002
34	8	"Her Girl Friday"	Josh Mepham	Susin Nielsen	Jason Horychun	May 22, 2002
35	9	"Uniformity"	Colleen Holub	Elizabeth Stewart	Sherwin Macario	May 29, 2002
35	9	"Caddy Girl"	Josh Mepham	Susin Nielsen	Don Boone	May 29, 2002
36	10	"The Creeps"	Josh Mepham	Daegan Fryklind	Luisito Escauriaga	June 5, 2002
36	10	"Sports Day"	Colleen Holub	Leslie Mildiner	John Delaney	June 5, 2002
37	11	"A New Leaf"	Colleen Holub	Susin Nielsen	Dennis Crawford	June 12, 2002
37	11	"Father's Day"	Josh Mepham	Cathy Moss	Jorden Oliwa	June 12, 2002
38	12	"Millionaire Mogul"	Colleen Holub	Elizabeth Stewart	Maurice Sherwood	August 7, 2002
38	12	"Block Party"	Josh Mepham	Sara Snow	Jason Horychun	August 7, 2002
39	13	"Law & Disorder"	Colleen Holub	Victor Nicolle	Sherwin Macario	August 14, 2002
39	13	"Where's the Fire?"	Josh Mepham	Victor Nicolle	Don Boone	August 14, 2002

== Awards ==
The show won a Pulcinella Award for the Best Series for Children in 2001.

== Telecast and home media ==
What About Mimi? was first premiered on Teletoon in 2000 until 2002 with repeats until the late 2000s. The show does not air in the U.S., but PorchLight's now-defunct KidMango had episodes online. Internationally, the show does air on Fox Kids (now as "Disney XD") in Latin America, CITV and Pop Girl in the United Kingdom, Minimax in Central Europe, and KiKa along with Junior in Germany. As of 2023, the show had added with YouTube online.

Two volumes of the show have been released on DVD in Canada by Anchor Bay Entertainment. Volume 1 includes four half-hour episodes and one 11-minute episode. Volume 2 includes three half-hour episodes and three 11-minute episodes. The first two episodes were additionally released on DVD in Australia by EM.TV as part of Junior's compilation series.

- Volume 1: Lights, Camera, Action; Outta Sync; The Play's The Thing; A Star Isn't Born and Critics Choice
- Volume 2: Wildthing; High Toon; Skiing is Believing; Iron Guy; Club Mimi and Sports Day
- The Best of J-Squad: Second Honeymoon and The Great Campaign
