= Alejandro Abellan =

Canadian actor

Alejandro Abellan (born May 13, 1965, in Ottawa, Ontario) is a Canadian film and television actor and Cannabis Advocate.

The son of Spanish immigrants, his first role in the film industry was as Antonio Banderas's stand-in and photo double for the film The Thirteenth Warrior. Alejandro's first big acting role was as Tito in "Phenomenon", based on the John Travolta movie. Alejandro then appeared as Coach Quintero on the Nickelodeon show Romeo!. Alejandro has also been in a few featured films such as Gray Matters.

In 2014, he founded National Access Cannabis becoming its first CEO. National Access Cannabis Corp went on to become Canada's largest publicly traded cannabis retailer by revenue. Alex is currently the owner of Chakra Cannabis and is a voice towards the responsible and safe use of cannabis.

== Cannabis Advocacy ==
Alex Abellan founded one of Canada's first Medical Marijuana dispensaries in 2014 when he became CEO of National Access Cannabis. With National Access Cannabis he worked with the Canadian government to advocate for responsible and safe distribution of Cannabis. Alex worked with the Australian government to help provide medical marijuana treatment for Tabetha and Georgia-Grace Fulton who were suffering from a rare lung disease. Alex Abellan was featured in Maclean's Magazine highlighting his advocacy amongst angel investors, government officials and tech innovators.
