= Tony Hawk in Boom Boom Sabotage =

- DVD cover
- Directed by: Johnny Darrell
- Written by: Doren Magy; Ben Burden Smith; Sib Ventress
- Produced by: Sharan Wood; Nicole Makila (associate)
- Starring: Noel Callahan; Michael Dobson; Aidan Drummond; Brian Drummond; Mackenzie Gray; Tony Hawk
- Narrated by: Michael Donovan
- Edited by: Jordan Atkinson; Sylvain Blais; Logan McPherson
- Music by: Brian Carson; Johnny Oilsin
- Production company: Mainframe Entertainment
- Distributed by: FUNimation Entertainment (U.S.); Alliance Atlantis (Canada)
- Release dates: September 12, 2006 (U.S.); March 12, 2007
- Running time: 70 minutes
- Countries: United States; Canada
- Language: English

Tony Hawk in Boom Boom Sabotage is a 2006 animated sports film starring Tony Hawk, produced by Mainframe Entertainment. FUNimation Entertainment distributed the film in the United States, while Alliance Atlantis distributed it in Canada. In Mainframe's earlier versions of the film, it used cel-shaded characters. Some of the early designs can still be seen on Mainframe's website. The film was widely panned by critics due to its poor animation, bizarre plot, and weak dialogue.

== Broadcast information ==
It has been seen on Cartoon Network and released on DVD.

YTV premiered the film on March 12, 2007.

== Plot ==
Disgruntled circus ringleader Larry Grimley and his band of performers plan to kidnap famous celebrity Tony Hawk and his crew to a remote island as ransom due to Mayor John Dullard (who is Grimley's cousin) destroying his beloved circus, for which Grimley swears vengeance. Now it is up to a bunch of five skateboarding kids (Kud, Kit, Sage, Switch Mitch and Jessie) to save Tony in time for the Boom Boom HuckJam.

== Voice cast ==
- Noel Callahan as Sage
- Michael Dobson as Larry Grimley / Worker / Homey Clown
- Michael Donovan as TV Narrator / Commercial VO
- Aidan Drummond as Jesse
- Brian Drummond as Hamshank / Chopper Chuck / DJ / Mimic
- Mackenzie Gray as Marshall / Boris / Stilt Walker / Floor Worker
- Tony Hawk as Himself
- Scott Hyland as Frank / Carnie
- David Kaye as Kud
- Colin Murdock as John Dullard / Carnie
- Brenna O'Brien as Jesse
- Nicole Oliver as Reporter / Buzzie Bee
- David Orth as Todd, Carnie
- Carter West as Switch Mitch
- Chiara Zanni as Kit

== See also ==
- List of animated feature films
- List of computer-animated films
