= Channel 45 digital TV stations in the United States =

The following television stations broadcast on digital channel 45 in the United States:

- K45KS-D in Billings, Montana, to move to channel 19
- W45DN-D in Washington, D.C., to move to channel 10, on virtual channel 46

The following television stations, which are no longer licensed, formerly broadcast on digital channel 45 in the United States:

- K45AF-D in Parachute, etc., Colorado
- K45AU-D in Follett, Texas
- K45DS-D in Freshwater, etc., California
- K45DY-D in New Mobeetie, Texas
- K45GD-D in Romeo, etc., Colorado
- K45IA-D in Rock Springs, Wyoming
- K45KT-D in Sargents, Colorado
- K45KX-D in Weed, California
- KCDR-LD in Cedar Rapids, Iowa
- KHPB-CD in Bastrop, Texas
- KLHU-CD in Lake Havasu City, Arizona
- KMDK-LD in Jonesboro, Arkansas
- W45DI-D in Juana Diaz, Puerto Rico
- W45DJ-D in Panama City, Florida
- W45ED-D in Clarksdale, Mississippi
- WJOS-LD in Pomeroy, Ohio
- WKDH in Houston, Mississippi
- WMUN-CD in Mineola, New York
