= WDPX-TV =

Television station in Woburn, Massachusetts

- Woburn–Boston, Massachusetts; United States
- City: Woburn, Massachusetts (Note: Originally licensed to Vineyard Haven, Massachusetts; moved to Woburn in 2018.)
- Channels: Digital: 22 (UHF), shared with WBPX-TV; Virtual: 58

Programming
- Affiliations: 58.1: Grit

Ownership
- Owner: Ion Media; (Ion Media License Company, LLC)
- Sister stations: WBPX-TV

History
- First air date: January 16, 1984
- Former call signs: W58AO (1984–1985); WCVX (1985–1994); WZBU (1994–1999); WDPX (1999–2009)
- Former channel numbers: Analog: 58 (UHF, 1984–2009); Digital: 40 (UHF, 2003–2018), 32 (UHF, 2018–2019)
- Former affiliations: Independent (1984–1991; 1994–1999); Dark (1991–1994); Ion Television (1999–2018); Ion Plus (2018–2021); Court TV (2021–2022)
- Call sign meaning: disambiguation of former parent station WBPX

Technical information
- Licensing authority: FCC
- Facility ID: 6476
- ERP: 150 kW
- HAAT: 334.59 m (1,098 ft)
- Transmitter coordinates: 42°23′2.7″N 71°29′35.3″W

Links
- Public license information: Public file; LMS

WDPX-TV (channel 58) is a television station licensed to Woburn, Massachusetts, United States, broadcasting the digital multicast network Grit to the Boston area. It is owned by the Ion Media subsidiary of the E. W. Scripps Company alongside Ion Television station WBPX-TV, channel 68 (and its Concord, New Hampshire–licensed full-time satellite WPXG-TV, channel 21). WDPX-TV and WBPX-TV broadcast from a shared transmitter on Parmenter Road in Hudson, Massachusetts.

== History ==
Channel 58 first signed on January 16, 1984, as 12,000-watt W58AO, a low-power station owned by Cape Cod Broadcasting and originally licensed to Vineyard Haven, Massachusetts, with studio facilities in Hyannis.

After temporarily going dark for one week a year-and-a-half later, channel 58 would relaunch on July 19, 1985, as full-power independent station WCVX, transmitting at a powerful 1.2 million watts. Its lineup included a twice-nightly newscast. However, it suffered early on due to lack of cable coverage, as the Supreme Court had struck down the Federal Communications Commission (FCC)'s must-carry rule on the very day WCVX launched, thus knocking it out of the 60 percent of homes in the Cape Cod region relying on cable television. Despite this early hurdle, however, area cable systems gradually began adding WCVX to their lineups, and by August 1987, it was carried by every provider on Cape Cod.

In spite of achieving the necessary cable carriage, WCVX was still ailing financially, and by late 1987, Cape Cod Broadcasting president Don Moore was forced to turn the station over to Sentry Federal Savings Bank, which chose Dan Carney to take over daily operations the following January. While viewership increased under Carney's tenure, WCVX continued to lose money, and after laying off nearly 85 percent of staffers just two years later, Sentry attempted to find a new owner for the struggling station. At one point, Sentry entered into negotiations with the owners of WNAC-TV, the Fox affiliate in Providence, Rhode Island, about possibly acquiring WCVX as a satellite station, but the deal collapsed after it was decided by the Fox affiliate board that any resulting boost would be minimal at best, especially considering that Cape Cod's aforementioned widespread cable penetration (which had increased to nearly 100 percent by late 1990, when the talks took place) meant that the Boston and Providence stations were already easily viewable there. Unable to find another willing buyer, Sentry decided to shut down WCVX, and the station went dark in the early hours of July 2, 1991, following an airing of the 1955 film Kentucky Rifle.

Three years after its demise, in 1994, Boston University bought the license and relaunched the station as WZBU, a Cape Cod satellite of Boston's WABU, channel 68 (along with WNBU in Concord, New Hampshire).

In May 1999, WZBU was sold along with WABU and WNBU to Devon Paxson, son of Paxson Communications founder Lowell Paxson, for $40 million; the stations would replace WBPX (channel 46) and WPXB (channel 60) as Boston's Pax TV affiliate, with WZBU's call sign being changed to WDPX. The DP Media stations would be acquired by Paxson Communications that December in a deal worth up to $173 million. Pax TV would become i: Independent Television in 2005 and Ion Television in 2007.

During the FCC's incentive auction, it was announced that the over-the-air spectrum of WDPX-TV had been sold for $43,467,644; the station indicated that it would enter into a post-auction channel sharing agreement. WDPX-TV now channel-shares with former parent station WBPX-TV; as the WBPX-TV signal does not reach Vineyard Haven, WDPX changed its city of license to Woburn, a northern suburb of Boston. Ion then took advantage of its main-channel carriage across the market to carry Ion Plus on the basic tier of most providers.

On February 27, 2021, Ion Plus shifted to online-only operation. WDPX became a Court TV owned-and-operated station shortly after. On February 25, 2022, WDPX moved its main-channel carriage to Grit.

== Subchannels ==
WBPX-TV and WDPX-TV transmit using WBPX-TV's spectrum from a tower on Parmenter Road in Hudson, Massachusetts.

Subchannels of WBPX-TV and WDPX-TV
License	Subchannel	Res.	Short name	Programming
WBPX-TV	68.1	720p	ION	Ion Television
WBPX-TV	68.2	480i	Mystery	Ion Mystery
WBPX-TV	68.3	480i	Laff	Busted
WBPX-TV	68.4	480i	Bounce	Bounce TV
WBPX-TV	68.5	480i	IONPlus	Ion Plus
WBPX-TV	68.6	480i	GameSho	Game Show Central
WBPX-TV	68.8	480i	HSN2	HSN2
WDPX-TV	58.1	720p	Grit	Grit

== See also ==
- Channel 58 virtual TV stations in the United States
- Channel 22 digital TV stations in the United States
- List of television stations in Massachusetts
