= Erica O'Keith =

American actress

- Born: December 19, 1984 (age 41); Los Angeles, California, U.S.
- Occupation: Actress
- Years active: 2003–present

Erica Lynn O' Keith (born December 19, 1984, in Los Angeles, California) is an actress best known for her role in the Nickelodeon sitcom Romeo!. She has also guest starred in Close to Home and Scrubs. She was also one of the girls on the bleachers in Corbin Bleu's music video for "Push It to the Limit".

During her free time she takes jazz, hip hop, and break dance lessons.

== Filmography ==
Year	Title	Role	Notes
2003–2006	Romeo!	Jodi Miller	
2006	Scrubs	Whitney	
2006	Close to Home	Michelle	
2007	Jane Doe	Kim	Episode: Ties That Bind
