= Noel Callahan =

Canadian actor

- Born: 1989 or 1990 (age 36–37)
- Occupation: Actor
- Years active: 2000–present

Noel Callahan is a Canadian actor who is best known for his roles as Louis Testaverde-Miller on the Nickelodeon show Romeo!

In 2006, he voiced the character of Sage in an animated film starring Tony Hawk called Tony Hawk in Boom Boom Sabotage.

Callahan attended St. Thomas Aquinas Regional Secondary School in Vancouver, Canada.
