= Channel 58 virtual TV stations in the United States =

The following television stations operate on virtual channel 58 in the United States:

- K25NK-D in Rochester, Minnesota
- KBFX-CD in Bakersfield, California
- KDTX-TV in Dallas, Texas
- KLCS in Los Angeles, California
- KQCA in Stockton, California
- KWBA-TV in Sierra Vista, Arizona
- W16DZ-D in Tyron, North Carolina
- W23EX-D in Sussex, New Jersey
- W27EC-D in Belvidere, New Jersey
- W29EV-D in Hackettstown, New Jersey
- W30EF-D in Jefferson, North Carolina
- W31DI-D in Spruce Pine, North Carolina
- WAWD in Fort Walton Beach, Florida
- WBKI in Salem, Indiana
- WBMA-LD in BIrmingham, Alabama
- WDES-CD in Miramar Beach, Florida
- WDJT-TV in Milwaukee, Wisconsin
- WDPX-TV in Vineyard Haven, Massachusetts
- WIAV-CD in Washington, D.C.
- WNAB in Nashville, Tennessee
- WNJB in New Brunswick, New Jersey
- WPGA-TV in Perry, Georgia
- WUJA in Caguas, Puerto Rico
- WUNG-TV in Concord, North Carolina

The following station, which is no longer licensed, formerly operated on virtual channel 58:

- WJOS-LD in Pomeroy, Ohio
