= WJOS-LD =

Television station in Pomeroy, Ohio (1997–2021)

- Pomeroy, Ohio; United States
- Channels: Digital: 45 (UHF)
- Branding: WJOS Channel 58

Programming
- Affiliations: FamilyNet (1993–2012); The Walk TV (2012–2021)

Ownership
- Owner: William A. Barnhardt

History
- Founded: 1993
- First air date: 1997
- Last air date: 2021 (license canceled on April 28, 2023)
- Former call signs: W27BO (1993–1998); WJOS-LP (1998–2012)
- Former channel numbers: Analog: 27 (UHF, 1993–2003); 58 (UHF, 2003–2012)
- Call sign meaning: Jesus, Our Son

Technical information
- Licensing authority: FCC
- Facility ID: 72479
- Class: LD
- ERP: 15 kW
- HAAT: 32.5 m (107 ft)
- Transmitter coordinates: 39°2′9.2″N 82°1′25.5″W

Links
- Public license information: LMS

WJOS-LD (channel 45) was a low-power television station in Pomeroy, Ohio, United States. The station broadcast local news, high school football and basketball, and religious programming from Meigs and Gallia counties in Ohio and Mason and Jackson counties in West Virginia.

== History and programming ==
The station was established in 1997 on channel 27 by William A. "Pete" Barnhart, pastor of the Restoration Fellowship Church at Pomeroy. In 1998, the local cable system began airing WJOS on channel 19 on weekday evenings and channel 23 on weekends, later shifting to 24-hour programming on channel 20. A new transmitter established in 2003 allowed WJOS to switch to UHF channel 58. WJOS's first home was Commercial Building 3 at the Meigs County Fairgrounds.

Most of WJOS's broadcasts were devoted to religious, family, and gospel music programming, much of it produced by the Christian Broadcasting Network.

=== Local programming ===
Barnhart's wife, Brenda, also a pastor of the Restoration Fellowship Church, hosted local news broadcasts on Thursday and Friday evenings. WJOS broadcast football and basketball games for Wahama High School in Mason, West Virginia, Gallia Academy, and Meigs County Schools. Religious programming included services and the program Joy for Your Journey, from the Syracuse Church of the Nazarene, services from Restoration Fellowship Church and Ripley Tabernacle Baptist Church on Sundays, along with gospel music on Monday evenings.

WJOS was involved in local community affairs, promoting local tourism with the Meigs County Chamber of Commerce, participating in a forum on local news coverage, and working with community members and churches to organize a support group for the bereaved.

WJOS also broadcast area Christmas concerts, including the Choirs of Angels concert in 1998 and various performances on Christmas Along the River.

=== Discontinuance ===
The station's owner, William Barnhart, died in 2017, and ownership of WJOS passed to Brenda Barnhart as executrix of her husband's estate. In 2020, Brenda Barnhart announced she was in talks to sell the station to an unspecified man from Texas and friend of the Barnharts whose programs had aired on WJOS; the buyer would eliminate local programming but continue to provide Christian programming. The sale never closed, and the station went dark some time in 2021. Its license was canceled by the Federal Communications Commission on April 28, 2023.

== See also ==
- Channel 45 digital TV stations in the United States
- Channel 58 virtual TV stations in the United States
