= Romeo! =

Canadian-American teen sitcom (2003–2006)

- Genre: Teen sitcom
- Created by: Fracaswell Hyman; Thomas W. Lynch; Percy Miller
- Starring: Romeo Miller; Master P Erica O'Keith; Noel Callahan; Zachary Isaiah Williams; Natashia Williams; Victoria Jackson; Brittney Wilson
- Countries of origin: United States; Canada
- Original language: English
- No. of seasons: 3
- No. of episodes: 53 (list of episodes)

Production
- Executive producers: Matt Dearborn; Thomas W. Lynch; Percy Miller
- Production locations: Vancouver, British Columbia, Canada
- Camera setup: Single-camera
- Running time: 30 minutes
- Production companies: Tom Lynch Company; P. Miller Collection; Nickelodeon Productions

Original release
- Network: Nickelodeon
- Release: September 13, 2003 – July 23, 2006

Romeo! is a teen sitcom that aired on Nickelodeon from September 13, 2003, to July 23, 2006, totaling 53 episodes in three seasons. The filming was done in Vancouver, British Columbia, while the show takes place in Seattle, Washington. The show stars Louisiana-based rapper Romeo as a fictionalized version of himself, known as "Ro".

Reruns aired on Nickelodeon until October 4, 2007, and on BET, MTV2 and The N until December 26, 2008.

== Premise ==
Romeo Miller raps in a band called "Pieces of The Puzzle" along with three of his siblings. His father, who is a record producer, provides guidance, along with Romeo's stepmother and nanny.

== Cast ==
The main characters from seasons 2–3, from left Jodi, Louis, Romeo, Myra, Gary, Angeline and Percy (top row)

=== Main cast ===
- Romeo as Romeo "Ro" Miller, the mischievous main character and leader of the family band (Pieces of The Puzzle/The Romeo Show). Romeo plays basketball and raps with Pieces of The Puzzle (later known as "The Romeo Show", but named after a show itself). In Season 1, in the mid-part, Romeo would have an imagination in a video-game world and sees in his perspective.
- Master P as Percy Miller, the father of Romeo and his siblings who was widowed in his first marriage and works as a big-time record producer. Percy is warm and loving, though sometimes strict, toward his children. Until Angie came along he was widowed.
- Erica O'Keith as Jodi Miller, the former lead singer of the band who is currently in college. The oldest sibling in the family, Jodi excels in school and has many friends. Jodi can be somewhat arrogant and controlling, but ultimately loves her siblings.
- Noel Callahan as Louis Testaverde Miller, the adopted white brother of Romeo and his other siblings, who's the same age as Romeo. Louis plays keyboard and guitar for the band. The Millers adopted Louis as their son sometime before the start of the show, but they love him deeply and treat him as their own son/brother, and he has quickly become Romeo's best friend. Louis is generally more cautious than Romeo.
- Zachary Isaiah Williams as Gary Miller, the second youngest of the Miller siblings, who does the turntables and drums for the band. Williams also had played Romeo's brother in the 2003 film Honey.
- Natashia Williams as Angeline "Angie" Eckert Miller (Seasons 2 – 3), Percy's second wife and the stepmother of Romeo, Jodi, Gary and Louis. Angeline's a kind, intelligent and loving woman who treats Jodi and the boys like they were her own children, and is also skilled at interpreting the emotions of the Millers. Angeline is also an architect.
- Victoria Jackson as Marie Rogers (Season 1), the Miller's eccentric nanny who formerly worked for a circus. Mrs. Rogers left before the second season to attend vet school.
- Morris Smith as Robert "Bobby" Miller, the youngest Miller child who's the half-sibling to Jodi and the boys. Angeline became pregnant with Bobby soon after she and Percy got married, and he was born in the season 3 episode, "Baby on Board!," a week until his due date. His nickname is "Big Bobby."

=== Recurring cast ===
- Brittney Wilson as Myra Strepp, Romeo's friend and Louis' girlfriend.
- Simeon Taole as Riley Morrison (seasons 2-3), Romeo's best friend.
- Brittany Moldowan as Peyton Cruz (seasons 2-3), Romeo's crush in Season 2.
- Ashley Phillips as herself (seasons 2-3), the new lead singer of the band who goes to Romeo's and Louis' school.

== Episodes ==
Season	Episodes	Originally released	
Season	Episodes	First released	Last released
1	20	September 13, 2003	June 26, 2004
2	20	August 28, 2004	May 8, 2005
3	13	April 1, 2006	July 23, 2006

== Home media ==
Although most of the episodes were not released on home media, two of the episodes were released on compilation sets.

Title	Episode count	Release date	Episodes
TEENick Picks, Volume 1	1	April 18, 2006	"Good Press"
Nickelodeon Kids' Choice Winners Collection	1	March 13, 2007	"Who Let the Dogs Out?"
