= KLHU-CD =

Television station in Lake Havasu City, Arizona (1984–2015)

- Lake Havasu City, Arizona; United States
- Channels: Digital: 45 (UHF); Virtual: 45
- Branding: Havasu 45

Programming
- Affiliations: Independent

Ownership
- Owner: Jensen Media Group; (Jensen Investments, FLP)

History
- First air date: February 23, 1984
- Last air date: November 19, 2015
- Former call signs: K45AJ (1982–2001); KLHU-CA (2001–2015)
- Call sign meaning: Lake Havasu

Technical information
- Facility ID: 30932
- Class: CD
- ERP: 0.42 kW
- HAAT: 47 m (154 ft)
- Transmitter coordinates: 34°36′9″N 114°22′15.8″W

KLHU-CD (channel 45) was a low-power, Class A independent television station in Lake Havasu City, Arizona, United States, last owned by locally based Jensen Media Group. The station had broadcast from a transmitter located on Goat Hill approximately five miles (8 km) north of Lake Havasu City and was carried on the local cable television system.

== History ==
London Bridge Broadcasting, a local company, was awarded an original construction permit on March 18, 1982, to build a low-power television station to serve Lake Havasu City and surrounding area. Given the call sign K45AJ, it was the first station in Arizona designated as "LPTV", a class of service that had recently been created by the FCC to allow low-power stations to originate programming. Its transmitter was located in an industrial park within the city limits northwest of downtown. The station was licensed on March 5, 1984.

In August 1993, London Bridge Broadcasting sold the station to Jeffrey Holmes, who in turn sold the station to James Husted (later part of TV 45 Productions Inc.) in July 1995. Under TV 45 Productions, the station upgraded its license to Class A status and changed its call letters to KLHU-CA in 2001. It moved its transmitter to Goat Hill in 2002.

KLHU-CA was sold to Jensen Investments, FLP of Seattle, Washington, in February 2004. The purchase originally included a time brokerage agreement, which stipulated that the station would broadcast in the English language and would not rebroadcast the over-the-air signal of any other station. In March 2005, Mark Jensen, managing partner of Jensen Investments, transferred the business to Lake Havasu City, where it operated as Jensen Media Group.

Full ownership of the station passed to Jolene Jensen following the death of Mark Jensen on December 21, 2012.

The station surrendered its license to the FCC on November 19, 2015.

== Programming ==
As an independent Class A station, KLHU-CD had no network programming commitments, but was required to offer a certain amount of locally produced programming each week. The station well met its local content requirement, airing its own 90-minute local newscast, called Havasu 45 N.E.W.S. (News, Events, Weather, Sports), three times each weekday. The station televised City Council meetings live, and offered local and state issues-oriented programming. They met E/I requirements with a syndicated children's television show called Critter Gitters that aired weekdays after school and on Saturday morning. The station broadcast an overnight movie, which it repeated in the early afternoon, and had an evening block of sporting events Mondays through Thursdays, some of it also locally produced.
