= 2023 in American television =

In American television in 2023, notable events included television show debuts, finales, and cancellations; channel launches, closures, and re-brandings; stations changing or adding their network affiliations; information on controversies, business transactions, and carriage disputes; and deaths of those who made various contributions to the medium.

== Television shows ==
=== Shows changing networks ===
Show	Moved from	Moved to	Source
Love & Hip Hop: Atlanta	VH1	MTV	
RuPaul's Drag Race	VH1	MTV	
All Star Shore	Paramount+	MTV	
FBI True	Paramount+	CBS	
Inside the NFL	Paramount+	The CW	
Miss USA	FYI	The CW	
FBOY Island	HBO Max	The CW	
Summer Camp Island	HBO Max	Cartoon Network	
Minx	HBO Max	Starz	
Shrek the Halls	ABC	NBC	
Miss Universe	Fox	The Roku Channel	
Kevin Hart's Muscle Car Crew	Motor Trend	The Roku Channel	
The Nevers	HBO	Tubi	
Screen Actors Guild Awards	TNT/TBS	YouTube (Note: Netflix's YouTube channel, before moving to Netflix itself in 2024.)	
Warrior	Cinemax	Max	
Joe Pickett	Spectrum Originals	Paramount+	
Superstar Racing Experience	CBS	ESPN	
Dancing with the Stars	Disney+	ABC/Disney+ (Note: Dancing with the Stars previously aired on ABC from its premiere in 2005 until 2021; Disney+, which streamed DWTS exclusively for its 31st season in 2022, will continue to livestream the program simultaneous with the ABC telecast.)	
Below Deck Down Under	Peacock	Bravo	
The Real Housewives of Miami	Peacock	Bravo	
NFL Sunday Ticket	DirecTV	YouTube TV (Note: EverPass Media, a new investment company funded by RedBird Capital and the NFL, will also distribute NFL Sunday Ticket to bars, restaurants, hotels and other commercial venues via existing cable and satellite providers (including DirecTV, which signed a multi-year agreement with EverPass on May 25, to continue distributing the package to its business customers) under non-exclusive agreements.)	

=== Milestone episodes and anniversaries ===
Show	Network	Episode #	Episode title	Episode airdate	Source
Family Guy	Fox	400th episode	"Love Story Guy" (Note: "Get Stewie", which aired on November 20, 2022, was publicized as the 400th episode.)	January 8	
Jimmy Kimmel Live!	ABC	20th anniversary	"George Clooney, Snoop Dogg, Coldplay"	January 26	
Bob's Burgers	Fox	250th episode	"Oh Row You Didn't"	February 19	
Chicago P.D.	NBC	200th episode	"Trapped"	February 22	
RuPaul's Drag Race	MTV	200th episode	"The Crystal Ball: Episode 200"	February 24	
NCIS	CBS	450th episode	"Unusual Suspects"	February 27	
The Lead with Jake Tapper	CNN	10th anniversary	"March 17, 2023"	March 17	
The Blacklist	NBC	200th episode	"The Hyena"	March 19	
The Young and the Restless	CBS	50th anniversary	"3/22/2023"	March 22	
All In with Chris Hayes	MSNBC	10th anniversary	March 31, 2023	March 31	
General Hospital	ABC	60th anniversary	Multiple	March 31; April 3–7	
The Neighborhood	CBS	100th episode	"Welcome to the Milestone"	April 10	
The Bold and the Beautiful	CBS	9,000th episode	"4/18/2023"	April 18	
Power Rangers	Netflix	30th anniversary	"Mighty Morphin Power Rangers: Once & Always"	April 19	
Beavis and Butt-Head	Paramount+	250th episode	"Pranks"	April 27	
American Dad!	TBS	350th episode	"Better on Paper"	May 8	
The Simpsons	Fox	750th episode	"Homer's Adventures Through the Windshield Glass"	May 21	
FBI	CBS	100th episode	"God Complex"	May 23	
On Patrol: Live	Reelz	100th episode	"072923"	July 29	
AEW Dynamite	TBS	200th episode	"Dynamite 200"	August 2	
When Calls the Heart	Hallmark Channel	100th episode	"Life Is But a Dream"	August 27	
Anderson Cooper 360°	CNN	20th anniversary	"September 8, 2023"	September 8	
The Rachel Maddow Show	MSNBC	15th anniversary	"September 11, 2023"	September 11	
Futurama	Hulu	150th episode	"All the Way Down"	September 25	
Thomas & Friends: All Engines Go	Cartoonito	100th episode	"The Super Axle"	October 30	
Paw Patrol	Nick Jr.	250th episode	"Mighty Pups vs. The Big Chill"	November 6	
Paw Patrol	Nick Jr.	250th episode	"Mighty Pups vs. The Mighty Cheetah"	November 7	
Kitchen Nightmares	Fox	100th episode	"South Brooklyn Foundry"	November 27	

=== Shows returning in 2023 ===
Show	Last aired	Type of return	Previous channel	Returning channel	Return date	Source
Lingo	2011	Revival	Game Show Network	CBS	January 11	
Night Court	1992	Revival	NBC	same	January 17	
Are You the One?	2019	New season	MTV	Paramount+	January 18	
Kitten Bowl (as Great American Rescue Bowl)	2021	Revival	Hallmark Channel	Great American Family	February 12	
XFL	2020	New season	ESPN/ABC/Fox/FS1	ESPN/ABC/FX	February 18	
Magnum P.I.	2022	New season	CBS	NBC	February 19	
Party Down	2010	Revival	Starz	same	February 24	
Farmer Wants a Wife	2008	Reboot	The CW	Fox	March 8	
Split Second	1987	Revival	First-run syndication	Game Show Network	April 17	
Clone High	2003	Revival	MTV	Max	May 23	
Warrior	2020	New season	Cinemax	Max	June 29	
Project Greenlight (as Project Greenlight: A New Generation)	2015	Revival	HBO	Max	July 13	
Justified (as Justified: City Primeval)	2015	Revival	FX	same	July 18	
Futurama	2013	New season	Comedy Central	Hulu	July 24	
Big Ten on CBS (as The Home Depot Big Ten on CBS)	1986	Revival	CBS	same	September 2	
Kitchen Nightmares	2014	New season	Fox	same	September 25	
Wild Kingdom (as Mutual of Omaha's Wild Kingdom Protecting the Wild)	2018	Revival	YouTube	NBC	October 7	
Frasier	2004	Revival	NBC	Paramount+	October 12	
Hollywood Squares (as Celebrity Squares)	2019	Revival	VH1	same	October 17	
Aqua Teen Hunger Force	2015	Revival	Adult Swim	same	November 26	

=== Shows ending in 2023 ===
End date	Show	Channel	First aired	Status	Source
January 1	Kaleidoscope	Netflix	2023	Ended	
January 3	Surviving R. Kelly	Lifetime	2019	Ended	
January 4	Madoff: The Monster of Wall Street	Netflix	2023	Ended	
January 6	Helpsters	Apple TV+	2019	Ended	
January 6	The Mosquito Coast	Apple TV+	2021	Canceled	
January 11	Willow	Disney+	2022	Canceled	
January 13	Hunters	Amazon Prime Video	2020	Ended	
January 13	Destination Fear	Travel Channel	2019	Canceled	
January 13	Echo 3	Apple TV+	2022	Canceled	
January 17	New Amsterdam	NBC	2018	Ended	
January 17	The Resident	Fox	2018	Canceled	
January 18	Home Economics	ABC	2021	Canceled	
January 18	Big Sky	ABC	2020	Canceled	
January 18	Ring Nation	First-run syndication	2022	Canceled	
January 19	Siesta Key	MTV	2017	Canceled	
January 20	Bling Empire: New York	Netflix	2023	Canceled	
January 20	Bake Squad	Netflix	2021	Canceled	
January 20	Puppy Dog Pals	Disney Jr.	2017	Canceled	
January 22	The L Word: Generation Q	Showtime	2019	Canceled	
January 26	Gossip Girl	HBO Max	2021	Canceled	
January 31	Below Deck Adventure	Bravo	2022	Canceled	
February 2	Freeridge	Netflix	2023	Canceled	
February 2	Welcome to Flatch	Fox	2022	Canceled	
February 3	Pinecone & Pony	Apple TV+	2022	Canceled	
February 6	Family Reunion: Love & Hip Hop Edition	VH1	2021	Canceled	
February 8	National Treasure: Edge of History	Disney+	2022	Canceled	
February 9	The Game	Paramount+	2021	Canceled	
February 10	Hallie Jackson Reports	MSNBC	2021	Ended	
February 10	Criss Angel's Magic with the Stars	The CW	2022	Ended	
February 15	The Nevers	Tubi	2021	Canceled	
February 15	Tug of Words	Game Show Network	2021	Canceled	
February 16	The Parent Test	ABC	2022	Canceled	
February 17	Animaniacs	Hulu	2020	Ended	
February 20	Ballmastrz: 9009	Adult Swim	2018	Ended	
February 24	Young Rock	NBC	2021	Canceled	
February 24	Oddballs	Netflix	2022	Canceled	
February 24	The Consultant	Amazon Prime Video	2023	Canceled	
February 24	The Real Friends of WeHo	MTV	2023	Canceled	
February 26	Family Karma	Bravo	2020	Canceled	
February 27	America's Got Talent: All-Stars	NBC	2023	Canceled	
February 28	I Am Jazz	TLC	2015	Canceled	
March 2	Walker: Independence	The CW	2022	Canceled	
March 2	Sex/Life	Netflix	2021	Canceled	
March 3	Next in Fashion	Netflix	2020	Canceled	
March 4	ACC on Regional Sports Networks	Bally Sports; MASN; NESN; Yes Network	2011	Canceled	
March 4	Alvinnn!!! and the Chipmunks	Nicktoons	2015	Canceled	
March 6	Ridley Jones	Netflix	2021	Canceled	
March 7	Relative Justice	First-run syndication	2021	Canceled	
March 7	The Winchesters	The CW	2022	Canceled	
March 8	Kung Fu	The CW	2021	Canceled	
March 10	Most Dangerous Game	The Roku Channel	2020	Canceled	
March 15	Are You the One?	Paramount+	2014	Canceled	
March 16	Shadow and Bone	Netflix	2021	Canceled	
March 16	Wolf Pack	Paramount+	2023	Canceled	
March 17	Carnival Row	Amazon Prime Video	2019	Ended	
March 17	Servant	Apple TV+	2019	Ended	
March 17	Agent Elvis	Netflix	2023	Canceled	
March 19	Your Honor	Showtime	2020	Ended	
March 24	Truth Be Told	Apple TV+	2019	Canceled	
March 24	Eureka!	Disney Jr.	2022	Canceled	
March 24	Dear Edward	Apple TV+	2023	Canceled	
March 24	Up Here	Hulu	2023	Canceled	
March 27	The Watchful Eye	Freeform	2023	Canceled	
March 27	Chrisley Knows Best	USA Network	2014	Canceled	
March 29	Abominable and the Invisible City	Peacock/Hulu	2022	Canceled	
March 30	Alaska Daily	ABC	2022	Canceled	
March 31	Doogie Kameāloha, M.D.	Disney+	2021	Canceled	
March 31	To The Gutierrez II	My Specialist	2014	Canceled	
March 31	Party Down	Starz	2009	Canceled	
March 31	Game Theory with Bomani Jones	HBO	2022	Canceled	
April 3	Saving Me	BYUtv	2022	Ended	
April 5	Wu-Tang: An American Saga	Hulu	2019	Ended	
April 6	Restaurant: Impossible (returned in 2026)	Food Network	2011	Canceled	
April 6	The Problem with Jon Stewart	Apple TV+	2021	Canceled	
April 6	Most Dangerous Game	Quibi	2020	Canceled	
April 7	Spicer & Co.	Newsmax TV	2020	Ended	
April 7	The Exhibit: Finding the Next Great Artist	MTV	2023	Ended	
April 7	Hello Tomorrow!	Apple TV+	2023	Ended	
April 8	The Owl House	Disney Channel	2020	Ended	
April 15	Total DramaRama	Cartoon Network	2018	Canceled	
April 16	Ryan's Mystery Playdate	Nick Jr.	2019	Canceled	
April 18	American Auto	NBC	2021	Canceled	
April 19	Snowfall	FX	2017	Ended	
April 20	Star Trek: Picard	Paramount+	2020	Ended	
April 21	Tucker Carlson Tonight	Fox News	2016	Canceled	
April 21	Slip	The Roku Channel	2023	Canceled	
April 21	Jury Duty	Amazon Freevee	2023	Canceled	
April 22	Unfiltered w/Dan Bongino	Fox News	2021	Canceled	
April 24	Perry Mason	HBO	2020	Canceled	
April 27	Firefly Lane	Netflix	2021	Ended	
April 27	The Late Late Show with James Corden	CBS	2015	Ended	
April 27	Ex on the Beach	MTV	2018	Ended	
April 27	Sharkdog	Netflix	2021	Ended	
April 28	Grand Crew	NBC	2021	Canceled	
April 28	Canada's Big World of Play	My Specialist	2003	Ended	
May 2	The Rookie: Feds	ABC	2022	Canceled	
May 2	MLW Underground Wrestling	Reelz	2023	Canceled	
May 3	The Goldbergs	ABC	2013	Ended	
May 3	A Million Little Things	ABC	2018	Ended	
May 3	Tooning Out the News	Comedy Central	2020	Canceled	
May 3	Schmigadoon!	Apple TV+	2021	Canceled	
May 4	Call Me Kat	Fox	2021	Canceled	
May 4	Bupkis	Peacock	2023	Canceled	
May 5	Secrets of Sulphur Springs	Disney Channel	2021	Canceled	
May 7	The Company You Keep	ABC	2023	Canceled	
May 7	Lucky Hank	AMC	2023	Canceled	
May 7	Rabbit Hole	Paramount+	2023	Canceled	
May 8	Fantasy Island	Fox	2021	Canceled	
May 10	Single Drunk Female	Freeform	2022	Canceled	
May 10	The Muppets Mayhem	Disney+	2023	Canceled	
May 10	African Queens	Netflix	2023	Canceled	
May 10	Growing Belushi	Discovery Channel	2023	Canceled	
May 11	Titans	HBO Max	2018	Ended	
May 11	Fired on Mars	HBO Max	2023	Ended	
May 11	Slasher	Chiller	2016	Ended	
May 11	Coronavirus Friends	My Specialist	2020	Canceled	
May 12	The Great	Hulu	2020	Canceled	
May 12	Saturdays	Disney Channel	2023	Canceled	
May 12	The Power	Amazon Prime Video	2023	Canceled	
May 14	East New York	CBS	2022	Canceled	
May 15	ATL Homicide	HBO	2019	Canceled	
May 16	Return to Amish	TLC	2014	Canceled	
May 17	True Lies	CBS	2023	Canceled	
May 17	Working: What We Do All Day	Netflix	2023	Canceled	
May 18	Rainn Wilson and the Geography of Bliss	Peacock	2023	Canceled	
May 19	A Black Lady Sketch Show	TV One	2018	Canceled	
May 19	Primo	Amazon Freevee	2023	Canceled	
May 19	Stillwater	Apple TV+	2020	Canceled	
May 21	NCIS: Los Angeles	CBS	2009	Ended	
May 24	The Flash	The CW	2014	Ended	
May 24	American Born Chinese	Disney+	2023	Canceled	
May 25	Vice News Tonight	Vice TV	2016	Canceled	
May 25	City Confidential	A&E	1998	Ended	
May 25	BattleBots	Discovery Channel	2000	Ended	
May 25	Dr. Phil	First-run syndication	2002	Ended	
May 25	Ghost Hunters	A&E	2004	Canceled	
May 25	Judge Mathis	First-run syndication	1999	Canceled	
May 26	You Bet Your Life	First-run syndication	1947	Canceled	
May 26	The Marvelous Mrs. Maisel	Amazon Prime Video	2017	Ended	
May 26	Blindspotting	Starz	2021	Canceled	
May 28	The Next Revolution	Fox News	2017	Canceled	
May 28	Succession	HBO	2018	Ended	
May 28	Barry	HBO	2018	Ended	
May 28	Ride	Hallmark Channel	2023	Canceled	
May 28	Fatal Attraction	Paramount+	2023	Canceled	
May 31	Dave	FXX	2020	Canceled	
May 31	Saint X	Hulu	2023	Canceled	
June 1	Grease: Rise of the Pink Ladies	Paramount+	2023	Canceled	
June 2	With Love	Amazon Prime Video	2021	Canceled	
June 2	Manifest	Netflix	2018	Ended	
June 7	Arnold	Netflix	2023	Ended	
June 7	Awkwafina Is Nora from Queens	Comedy Central	2020	Ended	
June 8	Never Have I Ever	Netflix	2020	Ended	
June 9	Human Resources	Netflix	2022	Ended	
June 14	Superstar	ABC	2021	Ended	
June 15	Gabrielle Union: My Journey to 50	BET+	2023	Ended	
June 16	City on Fire	Apple TV+	2023	Canceled	
June 21	High Desert	Apple TV+	2023	Canceled	
June 22	Glamorous	Netflix	2023	Canceled	
June 22	Skull Island	Netflix	2023	Canceled	
June 22	Queen of the Universe	Paramount+	2021	Canceled	
June 23	Catching Killers	Netflix	2021	Canceled	
June 23	Carpool Karaoke: The Series	Apple TV+	2017	Canceled	
June 23	The Great American Joke Off	The CW	2023	Canceled	
June 23	SciGirls	PBS Kids	2023	Ended	
June 24	Totally Weird and Funny	The CW	2023	Cancelled	
June 25	Vice	Showtime	2013	Cancelled	
June 27	Gotham Knights	The CW	2023	Cancelled	
June 29	The Other Two	Max	2019	Ended	
June 29	Ten Year Old Tom	Max	2021	Cancelled	
June 29	Erin & Aaron	Nickelodeon	2023	Cancelled	
June 29	Ten Year Old Tom	Max	2021	Cancelled	
June 30	Bubble Guppies	Nickelodeon	2011	Ended	
June 30	Unicorn: Warriors Eternal	Adult Swim	2023	Cancelled	
July 2	Valerie's Home Cooking	Food Network	2015	Cancelled	
July 2	The Eric Andre Show	Adult Swim	2012	Cancelled	
July 2	The Idol	HBO	2023	Cancelled	
July 7	Painting with John	HBO	2021	Cancelled	
July 7	The Horror of Dolores Roach	Amazon Prime Video	2023	Cancelled	
July 11	How I Met Your Father	Hulu	2022	Cancelled	
July 12	Quarterback	Netflix	2023	Cancelled	
July 13	The Blacklist	NBC	2013	Ended	
July 14	Run the World	Starz	2021	Canceled	
July 14	Jack Ryan	Amazon Prime Video	2018	Ended	
July 17	Black Ink Crew: Los Angeles	VH1	2019	Ended	
July 19	Mayans M.C.	FX	2018	Ended	
July 20	The Chase	ABC	2013	Canceled	
July 21	The People's Court	First-run syndication	1981	Canceled	
July 23	Bad Boys	Zeus Network	2022	Canceled	
July 26	The Hardy Boys	Hulu	2020	Ended	
July 27	iCarly	Paramount+	2021	Canceled	
July 28	This Fool	Disney+	2022	Canceled	
July 28	Rachael Ray	First-run syndication	2006	Ended	
July 28	The Wonderful World of Mickey Mouse	Disney+	2020	Ended	
July 28	This Fool	Hulu	2022	Canceled	
July 28	Captain Fall	Netflix	2023	Canceled	
July 30	Joe Pickett	Paramount+	2021	Canceled	
July 30	Tough as Nails	CBS	2020	Canceled	
July 31	Black Ink Crew	VH1	2013	Canceled	
July 31	Cruel Summer	Freeform	2021	Canceled	
August 6	HouseBroken	Fox	2021	Canceled	
August 8	Hot Wheels: Ultimate Challenge	NBC	2023	Canceled	
August 9	High School Musical: The Musical: The Series	Disney+	2019	Ended	
August 9	LA Fire & Rescue	NBC	2023	Canceled	
August 10	Mech Cadets	Netflix	2023	Ended	
August 11	Summer Camp Island	Cartoon Network	2018	Ended	
August 11	Swagger	Apple TV+	2021	Canceled	
August 16	The Wonder Years	ABC	2021	Canceled	
August 17	Warrior	Max	2019	Canceled	
August 17	My Dad the Bounty Hunter	Netflix	2023	Canceled	
August 18	Praise Petey	Freeform	2023	Canceled	
August 18	Pretty Freekin Scary	Disney Channel	2023	Canceled	
August 20	Luann & Sonja: Welcome to Crappie Lake	Bravo	2023	Canceled	
August 23	Riverdale	The CW	2017	Ended	
August 23	Nancy Drew	The CW	2019	Ended	
August 27	Telemarketers	HBO	2019	Canceled	
August 27	Running Wild with Bear Grylls (returned in 2026)	Nat Geo	2019	Canceled	
August 28	Miracle Workers	TBS	2019	Canceled	
August 28	Stars on Mars	Fox	2023	Canceled	
August 30	Heart of Invictus	Netflix	2023	Canceled	
September 1	Disenchantment	Netflix	2018	Ended	
September 1	How To with John Wilson	HBO	2020	Ended	
September 3	Raven's Home	Disney Channel	2017	Canceled	
September 3	Major League Baseball on NBC	NBC	1947	Ended	
September 3	Recipe for Disaster	The CW	2023	Ended	
September 3	Today's Homeowner with Danny Lipford	Syndication	1988	Ended	
September 6	The Afterparty	Apple TV+	2022	Canceled	
September 7	Kung Fu Panda: The Dragon Knight	Netflix	2022	Ended	
September 8	Minx	Starz	2022	Canceled	
September 13	The Other Black Girl	Hulu	2023	Canceled	
September 13	Wrestlers	Netflix	2023	Canceled	
September 15	Heels	Starz	2021	Canceled	
September 17	Winning Time: The Rise of the Lakers Dynasty	HBO	2022	Canceled	
September 20	Superfan	CBS	2023	Canceled	
September 20	Murdaugh Murders: A Southern Scandal	Netflix	2023	Canceled	
September 21	Generation Gap	ABC	2022	Canceled	
September 21	The Prank Panel	ABC	2023	Canceled	
September 22	Harlan Coben's Shelter	Amazon Prime Video	2023	Canceled	
September 24	Survive the Raft	Discovery Channel	2023	Canceled	
September 25	Breeders	FX	2020	Ended	
September 27	Physical	Apple TV+	2021	Ended	
September 27	Reservation Dogs	FX on Hulu	2021	Ended	
September 27	Strange Planet	Apple TV+	2023	Ended	
September 28	Fight to Survive	The CW	2023	Canceled	
September 28	Teenage Euthanasia	Adult Swim	2021	Canceled	
September 29	Interrupting Chicken	Apple TV+	2022	Canceled	
October 5	Tacoma FD	truTV	2019	Canceled	
October 7	Nightwatch	A&E	2015	Canceled	
October 12	Welcome to Rap City	BET	2023	Canceled	
October 13	The Changeling	Apple TV+	2023	Canceled	
October 15	Pantheon	Amazon Prime Video	2022	Canceled	
October 17	Good Bones	HGTV	2016	Ended	
October 18	The D'Amelio Show	Hulu	2021	Canceled	
October 19	The Challenge: USA	CBS	2022	Canceled	
October 19	Young Love	Max	2023	Canceled	
October 19	Wolf Like Me	Peacock	2023	Canceled	
October 26	Our Flag Means Death	Max	2022	Canceled	
October 29	Billions	Showtime	2016	Ended	
November 1	Behind the Attraction	Disney+	2021	Canceled	
November 2	Buddy Games	CBS	2023	Canceled	
November 3	People Puzzler	Game Show Network	2021	Canceled	
November 9	Doom Patrol	Max	2019	Ended	
November 9	Scavengers Reign	Max	2023	Canceled	
November 9	The Croods: Family Tree	Peacock	2021	Canceled	
November 12	The Circus	Showtime	2016	Ended	
November 17	Scott Pilgrim Takes Off	Netflix	2023	Canceled	
November 18	All Rise	Oprah Winfrey Network	2019	Ended	
November 19	Fear the Walking Dead	AMC	2015	Ended	
November 24	Go, Dog. Go!	Netflix	2021	Ended	
November 27	Mecha Builders	Cartoon Network	2022	Ended	
November 30	Obliterated	Netflix	2023	Canceled	
December 1	Shining Vale	Starz	2022	Canceled	
December 1	The Villains of Valley View	Disney Channel	2022	Canceled	
December 1	The Snoopy Show	Apple TV+	2023	Canceled	
December 2	SEC on CBS	CBS	1996	Ended	
December 6	Black Cake	Hulu	2023	Canceled	
December 6	The Santa Clauses	Disney+	2022	Ended	
December 7	Hilda	Netflix	2018	Ended	
December 7	All Star Shore	MTV	2022	Canceled	
December 8	FBoy Island	The CW	2021	Canceled	
December 11	Face's Music Party	Nickelodeon	2022	Canceled	
December 11	The Family Chantel	Nickelodeon	2022	Canceled	
December 13	If I Were Luísa Sonza	Netflix	2023	Canceled	
December 13	Snake Oil	Fox	2023	Canceled	
December 14	The Crown	Netflix	2016	Ended	
December 14	DreamWorks Dragons: The Nine Realms	Hulu/Peacock	2021	Ended	
December 15	Marvel Studios: Legends	Disney+	2021	Ended	
December 17	Archer	FXX	2009	Ended	
December 19	Real Sports with Bryant Gumbel	HBO	1995	Ended	
December 21	Julia	Max	2022	Canceled	
December 21	Rap Sh!t	Max	2022	Canceled	
December 21	Big Brother Reindeer Games	CBS	2023	Canceled	

=== Entering syndication in 2023 ===
A list of programs (current or canceled) that have accumulated enough episodes (between 65 and 100) or seasons (three or more) to be eligible for off-network syndication and/or basic cable runs.

Show	Seasons	In Production	Notes	Source
S.W.A.T.	6	Yes	Cable syndication on We TV.	
Insecure	5	No	Cable syndication on OWN.	
FBI	5	Yes	Broadcast syndication on Ion Television.	
Man with a Plan	4	No	Digital syndication on Laff.	
People Puzzler	3	No	Broadcast syndication to individual stations.	

== Networks and services ==
=== Launches ===
Network	Type	Launch date	Notes	Sources
CBS News Detroit	OTT streaming	January 23	On December 14, 2021, CBS News and Stations announced that it would launch CBS News Detroit, a hybrid news department utilizing resources from their Detroit duopoly of CBS O&O WWJ-TV and CW O&O WKBD-TV, which relaunched in-house news operations for the first time since their previous effort was discontinued in December 2002; the news department and streaming channel was originally planned to launch in the second or third quarter of 2022, but was delayed until January due to pandemic-related broadcast equipment supply issues. CBS News Detroit launched with the news operation on January 23 (see that date's entry in the "Events" section), initially offering supplemental national content from the CBS News streaming service for much of its schedule, outside of simulcasts of WWJ's initial two weeknight newscasts and a half-hour streaming-exclusive extension of its early evening edition. Collectively, CBS News Detroit is expected to eventually produce 137 hours per week of live news programming (40 hours of which consists of WWJ/WKBD news simulcasts), along with national CBS News streaming content.	
The Cowgirl Channel	Cable/satellite and OTT streaming	February 5	A spinoff of The Cowboy Channel, the Rural Media Group-owned network focuses on content dedicated to women in western sports. Programming includes live professional rodeo and other western sporting events (including barrel racing, breakaway roping and women's ranch rodeo events), and western-themed lifestyle content (such as fashion and home design programs). The Cowgirl Channel was initially available on Dish Network and Sling TV, along with live streaming and VOD content being made available on its sister network's dedicated OTT streaming service, Cowboy Channel+.	
CBS Sports Golazo Network	OTT streaming	April 11	A soccer-focused OTT network from CBS Sports, the network (which is based out of Stamford, Connecticut) features a new weekday morning snow called Morning Footy, live studio programming for the UEFA Champions League and NWSL, breaking news programming and select live matches from CBS's soccer properties.	(Note: "Golazo" is a Spanish soccer term, meaning "great goal".)
Spectrum News+	OTT streaming	April 17	A national cable/streaming news channel operated by Charter Communications-owned Spectrum Networks, the network features reports from Spectrum News' 30+ regional cable news channels (such as New York 1, Bay News 9, Spectrum News 13 and the Spectrum News 1 networks), as well as national and international headlines, weather coverage, special reports and selected original programming from various Spectrum News regional channels. The network—which initially offered a 24-hour rolling news schedule on weekdays, with plans to expand its weekend programming to a 24-hour schedule as well by Summer—was available at launch to Spectrum residential cable customers, the Spectrum News mobile app, and connected TV apps for Roku and Apple TV devices.	
Court TV Legendary Trials	OTT streaming	July 17	The E. W. Scripps Company's Scripps Networks unit launched two ad-supported streaming channels—initially available on Amazon Freevee, Fubo, Plex and Xumo Play—serving as extension services of namesake digital multicast networks Court TV and Laff. Court TV Legendary Trials features four-hour blocks of archival, high-profile court cases from the network's library (dating to its initial 1991–2005 existence as a cable channel), featuring commentary and analysis from current Court TV anchors, while Laff More features classic sitcoms and unscripted comedy programs from the 1950s to the 1990s (including many series shown on the linear Laff network) as well as comedy films.	
Laff More	OTT streaming	July 17		
CNN Max	OTT streaming	September 27	On August 24, Warner Bros. Discovery announced that it would incorporate live news into company's streaming service Max.	
Crunchyroll Channel	OTT streaming	October 11	On October 10, Sony announced it would launch the Crunchyroll Channel as a free ad-supported streaming television (FAST) network under a partnership between Crunchyroll and its sister channel, Game Show Network. The linear service launched on October 11 for The Roku Channel, LG Channels, and Vizio WatchFree+ platforms. The channel later became available on Amazon Freevee on October 17, and on Pluto TV on February 5, 2024. The initial programming lineup featured Japanese and English versions of anime titles such as Horimiya, Ranking of Kings, Moriarty the Patriot, Psycho-Pass, Arifureta: From Commonplace to World's Strongest, Sugar Apple Fairy Tale, To Your Eternity, and Code Geass.	
The Nest	OTA multicast	October 30	Five months after selling controlling interest in the sports-oriented Stadium to Silver Chalice (see May 29 entry), Sinclair Broadcast Group converts Stadium's OTA channel space into a network of "comfort food programming" (Sinclair's term) that features reruns of home improvement, true crime, reality and celebrity-driven shows.	
Bojangles	Cable network	December 2	In October 20, My Specialist is shutting down all of their apps and moved to Apple TV. In October 27, the cable providers are plugging My Specialist and replacing by Bojangles on the evening of December 1.	
NBCUniversal AVOD networks (27 channels)	OTT streaming	TBD	On June 29, NBCUniversal announced it would launch 27 thematic ad-supported streaming channels—initially available on Xumo Play (owned by corporate parent Comcast) and Amazon Freevee—consisting of content from the company's programming library, and programs sourced from its linear broadcast and cable channels. The networks consist of eight generalized programming services (reality-focused Bravo Vault; true crime networks Oxygen True Crime Archives and American Crimes; entertainment news and reviews channel Rotten Tomatoes; TNBC, featuring sitcoms originated on the 1992–2002 NBC Saturday morning block and other family-oriented comedies; and themed entertainment channels Universal Action, Universal Crime, Universal Monsters and Universal Westerns), two sports channels (sports news and talk service NBC Sports; and GolfPass, an extension of Golf Channel featuring news and features programs, and the linear network's original magazine and instructional programs), four Telemundo-based Spanish-language channels (romance-focused entertainment network Historias de Amor; Lo Mejor de Telemundo, featuring selected original reality series, dramas and telenovelas from the network; 24-hour streaming news service Noticias Telemundo Ahora; and entertainment and sports news service Telemundo al Día), and 13 series-specific channels (devoted to the Keeping Up with the Kardashians, Real Housewives, Top Chef, Million Dollar Listing, Bad Girls Club and Saved by the Bell franchises, Saturday Night Live, Little House on the Prairie, Alfred Hitchcock Presents, Lassie, The Lone Ranger, Made in Chelsea and Murder, She Wrote).	
Now TV	vMVPD streaming	TBD	On May 23, Comcast announced that it would launch an American version of Now, the vMVPD streaming service operated by its Sky Group division in the United Kingdom and Europe, which will be available to Xfinity Internet customers through the Xfinity Stream app on supported devices (including Xfinity Flex, Fire TV, iOS and Android devices), and via casting through AirPlay and Google Chromecast. The discount service will initially feature a lineup of around 40 channels from companies that include A&E Networks; AMC Networks; Allen Media Group; Crown Media Holdings; Great American Media; Sony Pictures Television and Warner Bros. Discovery (including A&E, Discovery Channel, History, AMC, Lifetime, Great American Family, Hallmark Channel, Game Show Network, The Weather Channel and Food Network), and over 20 free ad-supported television (FAST) channels operated by NBC, Sky and Xumo Play (such as NBC News Now and Sky News), as well as complimentary access to the ad-supported version of Peacock's premium tier (which Comcast will cease offering separately at no additional charge to subscribers of Xfinity's Internet tiers on June 26).	

=== Conversions and rebrandings ===
Old network name	New network name	Type	Conversion date	Notes	Source
Newsy	Scripps News	OTA multicast and OTT streaming	January 1	The E. W. Scripps Company announced on September 29, 2022, that it would rebrand Newsy as Scripps News, a rebranding that is part of a broader corporate reorganization of Scripps' national news services—including its Washington, D.C. bureau and the Scripps Local Media unit's Denver-based national desk—into a singular division under the same name. The move comes 1 1/2 years after a previous rebrand that saw Newsy expand its weekday live news and original news/interview programming, coinciding with the network's transition from a cable to an OTA multicast distribution model. (Scripps-owned Court TV—which offers a weekday block of trial coverage and crime-related news programming—remains under the oversight of the company's president of network news, Kate O'Brian, who is executive vice president of the new division.) At the start of June, Scripps's traditional broadcast stations began to carry a daily hour of Scripps news programming, replacing the hour formerly held by the internally-produced The List and The Upside.	
Epix	MGM+	OTT streaming and cable/satellite	January 15	On September 28, 2022, Metro-Goldwyn-Mayer announced that it would rebrand Epix and its companion OTT streaming service Epix Now as MGM+ on January 15, 2023, as part of a broader effort to realign the service with the MGM brand and as a streaming-first platform with accompanying linear channel offerings. The rebranded service's three linear multiplex channels were renamed accordingly: Epix 2 as MGM+ Hits, Epix Hits as MGM+ Marquee and Epix Drive-In as MGM+ Drive-In.	
Decades	Catchy Comedy	OTA multicast and vMVPD streaming	March 27	On February 13, Weigel Broadcasting announced that it would rebrand Decades as Catchy Comedy on March 27, as part of the classic television network's broader shift from a general entertainment format towards classic sitcoms. The rebranded network's schedule features a thematic block format on weekdays (featuring family-oriented sitcoms in the morning, female-driven sitcoms in daytime, comedies from the Norman Lear library in prime time, and "smart" comedies in late night), while the weekend "Decades Binge" block was rebranded as "The Catchy Binge," focusing on binge-style marathons of various classic comedies.	
Classic Reruns TV	NOST	OTA multicast and OTT streaming	April 3	On April 3, Classic Broadcasting rebranded Classic Reruns TV as NOST: The Nostalgia Network, shifting the network's format from classic television series to older licensed and public domain movies from the 1940s through the early 1980s. The rebranded network's schedule incorporates thematic film blocks, including westerns on midday weekdays, a nightly "Primetime Spotlight" presentation, weekly "matinee" films on Saturday mornings, and the science fiction and horror movie showcase Lord Blood-Rah's Nerve Wrackin' Theatre on Saturday nights.	
HBO Max	Max	OTT streaming	May 23	On April 12, Warner Bros. Discovery announced it would relaunch HBO Max as Max, featuring content from HBO Max's and much of Discovery+'s libraries (including original content as well as content from various WBD brands such as Warner Bros., New Line Cinema, CNN, Discovery Channel, HGTV, Food Network, Cartoon Network and Warner Bros. Animation). Originally announced on August 4, 2022, the combined service was originally planned to operate on Discovery+'s existing app infrastructure and utilize that service's technical operations (as HBO Max ran on the infrastructure originally designed to support the smaller content selection and less intensive technical demands of the predecessor HBO Go and HBO Now services); however, WBD abandoned plans to fully integrate the services on February 23, choosing to maintain Discovery+ as a standalone platform due to the higher price point for Max, while incorporating much of the service's content library into Max. In addition to maintaining HBO Max's ad-free and ad-supported tiers at their existing price points (with user profiles, watch histories and other settings being ported to the relaunched service), Max included a tertiary "Ultimate" ad-free tier that features an expanded catalog of 4K UHD content (previously available to lower-tier subscribers) and Dolby Atmos surround sound.	
LX News	NBC LX Home	OTA multicast and OTT streaming	August	Approximately 40 staffers at LX News were told on May 3 that NBCUniversal would be "winding down" the service, with a closure date expected in mid-2023 and employees being considered for other positions within the NBCU portfolio. LX News featured news/lifestyle features and longform content geared toward Gen Z and millennial audiences. Following the rebrand, NBC LX Home now airs LXTV produced lifestyle programs.	
NBC Sports Washington	Monumental Sports Network	Regional sports network	September 12	In August 2022, Monumental Sports & Entertainment purchased NBC Sports Washington from NBCUniversal. Monumental owns the Washington Wizards, Washington Capitals and Washington Mystics, all of which have television rights agreements with the network. In June 2023, Monumental announced plans to rebrand the network in September 2023.	
AT&T SportsNet Pittsburgh	SportsNet Pittsburgh	Regional sports network	October 2	On August 31, 2023, the Pittsburgh Penguins announced its intent to purchase AT&T SportsNet Pittsburgh and rebrand it as SportsNet Pittsburgh on October 2. NESN, which is owned by Penguins owner Fenway Sports Group, operates the network. The purchase comes after AT&T SportsNet owner Warner Bros. Discovery announced in February they were leaving the regional sports network business.	
AT&T SportsNet Southwest	Space City Home Network	Regional sports network	October 3	On September 16, 2023, the Houston Chronicle reported that the Houston Astros and Houston Rockets planned to purchase AT&T SportsNet Southwest and rebrand it as Space City Home Network prior to the start of the 2023–24 Houston Rockets season.	
Dabl	same	OTA multicast	December 29	On December 21, Paramount Global announced that it would rebrand Dabl as an African American-oriented network, focusing on sitcoms that features a predominantly black cast from the 1990s to the 2000s. As part of the rebrand, its OTT streaming network on Pluto TV was discontinued.	

=== Closures ===
Network	Type	End date	Notes	Sources
DirecTV Red Zone Channel	Satellite	January 8	In December 2022, with the announcement that rights to NFL Sunday Ticket moved from DirecTV exclusively to YouTube (though it continues to carry the service for commercial and hospitality establishments under a subcontract), it was confirmed that the service would not produce its own equivalent, and would simply distribute the NFL Network-produced RedZone.	
PeopleTV	OTT streaming	January 31	On January 24, Dotdash Meredith began notifying carriers of the streaming entertainment news and lifestyle channel (which include vMVPD providers Philo and FuboTV, and AVOD streaming services Tubi, Local Now, DistroTV, Stirr and Xumo Play) that it would shut down PeopleTV, a spin-off of the entertainment magazine, effective January 31.	
TrueReal	OTA multicast	March 27	On March 10, the E. W. Scripps Company announced that it would discontinue TrueReal, effective March 27, and fold selected programming from its lineup (such as Storage Wars and Parking Wars) into the schedule of sister multicast network Defy TV; both networks had featured reruns of unscripted programming from the A&E Networks library, and had targeted different audiences in the 25-54 age group (TrueReal for women, Defy towards men), since jointly launching in July 2021. Scripps leased TrueReal's transponder space to Jewelry Television, which filled the network's subchannel placements on Scripps- and Inyo Broadcast Holdings-owned stations.	
VRV	OTT streaming	May 8	On April 3, Crunchyroll, LLC announced that the anime, speculative fiction and gaming-centered streaming service would cease operating as a standalone service and integrate much of its content with the parent company's namesake service, effective May 3; existing VRV subscriptions (including watch histories and queues) migrated to the Crunchyroll Premium service. The dissolution of VRV—launched in November 2016 as a joint venture between AT&T and the Chernin Group, and consisting of content from Crunchyroll and Mondo Media in addition to the premium tier VRV Select—is part of a broader consolidation of Crunchyroll, LLC's international anime streaming platforms (including Funimation and Wakanim) into the existing Crunchyroll platform, which Sony Pictures and Aniplex acquired from WarnerMedia in August 2021.	
Bally Sports Arizona	Regional sports network	October 21	On October 13, Bally Sports Arizona announced on Twitter that it was shutting down. The network had lost the rights to its three professional sports teams due to its parent company's ongoing bankruptcy.	
SportsNet Rocky Mountain	Regional sports network	December 31	On September 5, The Denver Post reported that AT&T SportsNet Rocky Mountain had notified its employees that the network would shut down at the end of the year. October 6 was the last day of work for full-time employees.	
Stadium College Sports	Cable network	December 31	With Sinclair's sale of their stake in Stadium in full to Silver Chalice and the Stadium network being replaced over-the-air with The Nest, Stadium College Sports was quietly and ultimately shut down on December 31, 2023.	
Circle	OTA multicast	December 31	On November 10, Gray Television announced that it would discontinue broadcast operations of Circle Network after December 31, with programming transitioning to streaming and other digital distribution platforms.	
Twist	OTA multicast	December 31	In a video uploaded to Vimeo on November 15, Tegna announced that it planned to shut down Twist. The network, which launched on April 5, 2021, featured reruns of reality programming aimed at women in the 25–34 age group, sourced from the NBCUniversal library.	

== Television stations ==
=== Station launches ===
Date	Market	Station	Channel	Affiliation	Notes	Source
February 9	Fargo-Grand Forks, North Dakota	KNGF	27.1	BEK Sports	Channel 27 in Grand Forks was formerly occupied by KCPM, whose license was canceled on March 9, 2020, for failure to transmit from authorized facilities for the past 12 months. The frequency was put up for auction on June 7, 2022, along with 26 other full-power TV licenses. BEK Sports Network, Inc. was awarded channel 27 with a $6,411,000 winning bid. BEK was formally granted a construction permit for the new station on July 25, 2022. KNGF filed for a license to cover on February 9, 2023, which usually indicates that a station has signed on the air. Prior to KNGF's launch, BEK programming was seen on KRDK-TV (channel 4) during the afternoon and evening hours.	
February 9	Fargo-Grand Forks, North Dakota	KNGF	27.2	BEK Sports Plus East		
February 9	Fargo-Grand Forks, North Dakota	KNGF	27.3	BEK Sports Plus West		
February 9	Fargo-Grand Forks, North Dakota	KNGF	27.4	NewsNet		
September 26	Flagstaff, Arizona	KAZF	32.1	Independent	In 2022, Gray Television participated in an FCC auction of new TV stations and paid $4.648 million for channel 32 in Flagstaff and $1.345 million for channel 11 in Yuma. The FCC approved a request from Gray Television to change the Yuma allotment from VHF channel 11 to UHF channel 27 in February 2023. KAZS, the Yuma station, began broadcasting by September 26, 2023, when KAZF in Flagstaff debuted.	
September 26	Yuma, Arizona-El Centro, California	KAZS	27.1	Independent	In 2022, Gray Television participated in an FCC auction of new TV stations and paid $4.648 million for channel 32 in Flagstaff and $1.345 million for channel 11 in Yuma. The FCC approved a request from Gray Television to change the Yuma allotment from VHF channel 11 to UHF channel 27 in February 2023. KAZS, the Yuma station, began broadcasting by September 26, 2023, when KAZF in Flagstaff debuted.	

=== Subchannel launches ===
Date	Market	Station	Channel	Affiliation	Notes	Source
January 13	El Paso, Texas	KVIA-TV	7.4	QVC Over the Air	On October 21, 2022, Innovate Corp, the company that owned Azteca America, announced that the network would cease operations on December 31, 2022. Prior to the announcement, TV Azteca had entered into a content and co-production agreement with competitor Estrella TV that will see its news and entertainment programming blended onto that network's schedule. TV Stations were notified of the closure and had switched affiliations to other networks such as Estrella TV and Vision Latina.	
January 18	Caguas-San Juan, Puerto Rico	WLII-DT	11.3	Vision Latina		
January 30	Panama City, Florida	W20DX-D	20.2	Jewelry Television		
February 1	Decatur-Champaign-Springfield, Illinois	WBUI	23.4	Rewind TV		
February 28	Baton Rouge, Louisiana	WVLA-TV	33.4	Antenna TV	On February 28, 2023, WVLA added Antenna TV (owned by station parent Nexstar Media Group) to a new subchannel on 33.4, approximately one month after original affiliate WLFT-CD disaffiliated from the network and switched to the religious Sonlife Broadcasting Network upon being purchased by Family Worship Center.	
March 28	Bryan, Texas	KRHD-CD	15.4	Jewelry Television	E. W. Scripps Company announced on March 10 that programming from TrueReal would be folded into the schedule of sister multicast network Defy TV (see Closures above). The Scripps spectrum space TrueReal leaves behind will be leased by Scripps to the shopping channel Jewelry Television.	
March 28	Bryan, Texas	KRHD-CD	15.5	HSN	E. W. Scripps Company announced on March 10 that programming from TrueReal would be folded into the schedule of sister multicast network Defy TV (see Closures above). The Scripps spectrum space TrueReal leaves behind will be leased by Scripps to the shopping channel Jewelry Television.	
April 14	Grand Junction, Colorado	KLML	20.6	Rewind TV	On April 14, 2023, KLML switched its DT6 subchannel to Rewind TV, two weeks after the demise of TrueReal.	
July 1	Miami, Florida	WFOR-TV	4.5	Catchy Comedy		
July 1	New York City	WJLP	33.2	Comet		
October 2	Charlotte, North Carolina	WSOC-TV	9.4	Comet		
October 9	Twin Falls, Idaho	KSAW-LD	6.6	Laff	Changes made to allow Vegas Golden Knights games to air on the newly independent subchannels	

=== Stations changing network affiliations ===
Date	Market	Station	Channel	Prior affiliation	New affiliation	Notes	Source
January 1	Albuquerque, New Mexico	KQDF-LD	25.1	Azteca America	Vision Latina	On October 21, 2022, Innovate Corp, the company that owned Azteca America, announced that the network would cease operations on December 31, 2022. Prior to the announcement, TV Azteca had entered into a content and co-production agreement with competitor Estrella TV that will see its news and entertainment programming blended onto that network's schedule. Many stations owned by Innovate switched to other networks such as Estrella TV and Vision Latina.	
January 1	Atlanta, Georgia	WUVM-LD	4.1	Azteca America	Estrella TV	On October 21, 2022, Innovate Corp, the company that owned Azteca America, announced that the network would cease operations on December 31, 2022. Prior to the announcement, TV Azteca had entered into a content and co-production agreement with competitor Estrella TV that will see its news and entertainment programming blended onto that network's schedule. Many stations owned by Innovate switched to other networks such as Estrella TV and Vision Latina.	
January 1	Baltimore, Maryland– Washington, D.C.	WQAW-LD	69.1	Azteca America	Novelisima	On October 21, 2022, Innovate Corp, the company that owned Azteca America, announced that the network would cease operations on December 31, 2022. Prior to the announcement, TV Azteca had entered into a content and co-production agreement with competitor Estrella TV that will see its news and entertainment programming blended onto that network's schedule. Many stations owned by Innovate switched to other networks such as Estrella TV and Vision Latina.	
January 1	Baton Rouge, Louisiana	K29LR-D	47.1	Azteca America	Estrella TV	On October 21, 2022, Innovate Corp, the company that owned Azteca America, announced that the network would cease operations on December 31, 2022. Prior to the announcement, TV Azteca had entered into a content and co-production agreement with competitor Estrella TV that will see its news and entertainment programming blended onto that network's schedule. Many stations owned by Innovate switched to other networks such as Estrella TV and Vision Latina.	
January 1	Boise, Idaho	KFLL-LD	25.1	Azteca America	Infomercials	On October 21, 2022, Innovate Corp, the company that owned Azteca America, announced that the network would cease operations on December 31, 2022. Prior to the announcement, TV Azteca had entered into a content and co-production agreement with competitor Estrella TV that will see its news and entertainment programming blended onto that network's schedule. Many stations owned by Innovate switched to other networks such as Estrella TV and Vision Latina.	
January 1	Chicago, Illinois	WPVN-CD	24.1	Azteca America	Vision Latina	On October 21, 2022, Innovate Corp, the company that owned Azteca America, announced that the network would cease operations on December 31, 2022. Prior to the announcement, TV Azteca had entered into a content and co-production agreement with competitor Estrella TV that will see its news and entertainment programming blended onto that network's schedule. Many stations owned by Innovate switched to other networks such as Estrella TV and Vision Latina.	
January 1	Columbus, Georgia	W29FD-D	43.1	Azteca America	Defy TV	On October 21, 2022, Innovate Corp, the company that owned Azteca America, announced that the network would cease operations on December 31, 2022. Prior to the announcement, TV Azteca had entered into a content and co-production agreement with competitor Estrella TV that will see its news and entertainment programming blended onto that network's schedule. Many stations owned by Innovate switched to other networks such as Estrella TV and Vision Latina.	
January 1	Columbus, Ohio	WDEM-CD	17.1	Azteca America	Estrella TV	On October 21, 2022, Innovate Corp, the company that owned Azteca America, announced that the network would cease operations on December 31, 2022. Prior to the announcement, TV Azteca had entered into a content and co-production agreement with competitor Estrella TV that will see its news and entertainment programming blended onto that network's schedule. Many stations owned by Innovate switched to other networks such as Estrella TV and Vision Latina.	
January 1	Corpus Christi, Texas	KCCX-LD	24.1	Azteca America	Timeless TV	On October 21, 2022, Innovate Corp, the company that owned Azteca America, announced that the network would cease operations on December 31, 2022. Prior to the announcement, TV Azteca had entered into a content and co-production agreement with competitor Estrella TV that will see its news and entertainment programming blended onto that network's schedule. Many stations owned by Innovate switched to other networks such as Estrella TV and Vision Latina.	
January 1	Des Moines, Iowa	KRPG-LD	43.1	Azteca America	Vision Latina	On October 21, 2022, Innovate Corp, the company that owned Azteca America, announced that the network would cease operations on December 31, 2022. Prior to the announcement, TV Azteca had entered into a content and co-production agreement with competitor Estrella TV that will see its news and entertainment programming blended onto that network's schedule. Many stations owned by Innovate switched to other networks such as Estrella TV and Vision Latina.	
January 1	Fort Wayne, Indiana	WCUH-LD	16.1	Azteca America	Vision Latina	On October 21, 2022, Innovate Corp, the company that owned Azteca America, announced that the network would cease operations on December 31, 2022. Prior to the announcement, TV Azteca had entered into a content and co-production agreement with competitor Estrella TV that will see its news and entertainment programming blended onto that network's schedule. Many stations owned by Innovate switched to other networks such as Estrella TV and Vision Latina.	
January 1	Hartford, Connecticut	WRNT-LD	32.1	Azteca America	Timeless TV	On October 21, 2022, Innovate Corp, the company that owned Azteca America, announced that the network would cease operations on December 31, 2022. Prior to the announcement, TV Azteca had entered into a content and co-production agreement with competitor Estrella TV that will see its news and entertainment programming blended onto that network's schedule. Many stations owned by Innovate switched to other networks such as Estrella TV and Vision Latina.	
January 1	Hartford, Connecticut	WTXX-LD	34.1	Azteca America	Timeless TV	On October 21, 2022, Innovate Corp, the company that owned Azteca America, announced that the network would cease operations on December 31, 2022. Prior to the announcement, TV Azteca had entered into a content and co-production agreement with competitor Estrella TV that will see its news and entertainment programming blended onto that network's schedule. Many stations owned by Innovate switched to other networks such as Estrella TV and Vision Latina.	
January 1	Las Vegas, Nevada	KHDF-CD	19.1	Azteca America	Vision Latina	On October 21, 2022, Innovate Corp, the company that owned Azteca America, announced that the network would cease operations on December 31, 2022. Prior to the announcement, TV Azteca had entered into a content and co-production agreement with competitor Estrella TV that will see its news and entertainment programming blended onto that network's schedule. Many stations owned by Innovate switched to other networks such as Estrella TV and Vision Latina.	
January 1	Madison, Wisconsin	W23BW-D	23.1	Azteca America	Timeless TV	On October 21, 2022, Innovate Corp, the company that owned Azteca America, announced that the network would cease operations on December 31, 2022. Prior to the announcement, TV Azteca had entered into a content and co-production agreement with competitor Estrella TV that will see its news and entertainment programming blended onto that network's schedule. Many stations owned by Innovate switched to other networks such as Estrella TV and Vision Latina.	
January 1	Midland–Flint, Michigan	WFFC-LD	17.1	Azteca America	Infomercials	On October 21, 2022, Innovate Corp, the company that owned Azteca America, announced that the network would cease operations on December 31, 2022. Prior to the announcement, TV Azteca had entered into a content and co-production agreement with competitor Estrella TV that will see its news and entertainment programming blended onto that network's schedule. Many stations owned by Innovate switched to other networks such as Estrella TV and Vision Latina.	
January 1	Milwaukee, Wisconsin	WTSJ-LD	38.1	Azteca America	Timeless TV	On October 21, 2022, Innovate Corp, the company that owned Azteca America, announced that the network would cease operations on December 31, 2022. Prior to the announcement, TV Azteca had entered into a content and co-production agreement with competitor Estrella TV that will see its news and entertainment programming blended onto that network's schedule. Many stations owned by Innovate switched to other networks such as Estrella TV and Vision Latina.	
January 1	Mobile, Alabama	WWBH-LD	28.1	Azteca America	Timeless TV	On October 21, 2022, Innovate Corp, the company that owned Azteca America, announced that the network would cease operations on December 31, 2022. Prior to the announcement, TV Azteca had entered into a content and co-production agreement with competitor Estrella TV that will see its news and entertainment programming blended onto that network's schedule. Many stations owned by Innovate switched to other networks such as Estrella TV and Vision Latina.	
January 1	Monterey, California	KBIT-LD	43.1	Azteca America	Telemax	On October 21, 2022, Innovate Corp, the company that owned Azteca America, announced that the network would cease operations on December 31, 2022. Prior to the announcement, TV Azteca had entered into a content and co-production agreement with competitor Estrella TV that will see its news and entertainment programming blended onto that network's schedule. Many stations owned by Innovate switched to other networks such as Estrella TV and Vision Latina.	
January 1	New Orleans, Louisiana	WTNO-CD	22.1	Azteca America	Estrella TV	On October 21, 2022, Innovate Corp, the company that owned Azteca America, announced that the network would cease operations on December 31, 2022. Prior to the announcement, TV Azteca had entered into a content and co-production agreement with competitor Estrella TV that will see its news and entertainment programming blended onto that network's schedule. Many stations owned by Innovate switched to other networks such as Estrella TV and Vision Latina.	
January 1	New York City	WKOB-LD	42.1	Azteca America	Vision Latina	On October 21, 2022, Innovate Corp, the company that owned Azteca America, announced that the network would cease operations on December 31, 2022. Prior to the announcement, TV Azteca had entered into a content and co-production agreement with competitor Estrella TV that will see its news and entertainment programming blended onto that network's schedule. Many stations owned by Innovate switched to other networks such as Estrella TV and Vision Latina.	
January 1	Oklahoma City, Oklahoma	KOHC-CD	45.1	Azteca America	Novelisima	On October 21, 2022, Innovate Corp, the company that owned Azteca America, announced that the network would cease operations on December 31, 2022. Prior to the announcement, TV Azteca had entered into a content and co-production agreement with competitor Estrella TV that will see its news and entertainment programming blended onto that network's schedule. Many stations owned by Innovate switched to other networks such as Estrella TV and Vision Latina.	
January 1	Orlando, Florida	WFEF-LD	50.1	Azteca America	Infomercials	On October 21, 2022, Innovate Corp, the company that owned Azteca America, announced that the network would cease operations on December 31, 2022. Prior to the announcement, TV Azteca had entered into a content and co-production agreement with competitor Estrella TV that will see its news and entertainment programming blended onto that network's schedule. Many stations owned by Innovate switched to other networks such as Estrella TV and Vision Latina.	
January 1	Philadelphia, Pennsylvania	WPSJ-CD	8.1	Azteca America	Vision Latina	On October 21, 2022, Innovate Corp, the company that owned Azteca America, announced that the network would cease operations on December 31, 2022. Prior to the announcement, TV Azteca had entered into a content and co-production agreement with competitor Estrella TV that will see its news and entertainment programming blended onto that network's schedule. Many stations owned by Innovate switched to other networks such as Estrella TV and Vision Latina.	
January 1	Raleigh, North Carolina	WIRP-LD	27.1	Azteca America	Estrella TV	On October 21, 2022, Innovate Corp, the company that owned Azteca America, announced that the network would cease operations on December 31, 2022. Prior to the announcement, TV Azteca had entered into a content and co-production agreement with competitor Estrella TV that will see its news and entertainment programming blended onto that network's schedule. Many stations owned by Innovate switched to other networks such as Estrella TV and Vision Latina.	
January 1	Sacramento, California	KSAO-LD	49.1	Azteca America	NewsNet	On October 21, 2022, Innovate Corp, the company that owned Azteca America, announced that the network would cease operations on December 31, 2022. Prior to the announcement, TV Azteca had entered into a content and co-production agreement with competitor Estrella TV that will see its news and entertainment programming blended onto that network's schedule. Many stations owned by Innovate switched to other networks such as Estrella TV and Vision Latina.	
January 1	St. Louis, Missouri	K25NG-D	25.1	Azteca America	Estrella TV	On October 21, 2022, Innovate Corp, the company that owned Azteca America, announced that the network would cease operations on December 31, 2022. Prior to the announcement, TV Azteca had entered into a content and co-production agreement with competitor Estrella TV that will see its news and entertainment programming blended onto that network's schedule. Many stations owned by Innovate switched to other networks such as Estrella TV and Vision Latina.	
January 1	Salisbury, Maryland	WGDV-LD	32.1	Azteca America	MeTV	On October 21, 2022, Innovate Corp, the company that owned Azteca America, announced that the network would cease operations on December 31, 2022. Prior to the announcement, TV Azteca had entered into a content and co-production agreement with competitor Estrella TV that will see its news and entertainment programming blended onto that network's schedule. Many stations owned by Innovate switched to other networks such as Estrella TV and Vision Latina.	
January 1	San Juan, Puerto Rico	WOST	14.2	Azteca America	Timeless TV	On October 21, 2022, Innovate Corp, the company that owned Azteca America, announced that the network would cease operations on December 31, 2022. Prior to the announcement, TV Azteca had entered into a content and co-production agreement with competitor Estrella TV that will see its news and entertainment programming blended onto that network's schedule. Many stations owned by Innovate switched to other networks such as Estrella TV and Vision Latina.	
January 1	San Luis Obispo, California	KSBO-CD	42.1	Azteca America	Estrella TV	On October 21, 2022, Innovate Corp, the company that owned Azteca America, announced that the network would cease operations on December 31, 2022. Prior to the announcement, TV Azteca had entered into a content and co-production agreement with competitor Estrella TV that will see its news and entertainment programming blended onto that network's schedule. Many stations owned by Innovate switched to other networks such as Estrella TV and Vision Latina.	
January 1	Seattle, Washington	KUSE-LD	46.1	Azteca America	Vision Latina	On October 21, 2022, Innovate Corp, the company that owned Azteca America, announced that the network would cease operations on December 31, 2022. Prior to the announcement, TV Azteca had entered into a content and co-production agreement with competitor Estrella TV that will see its news and entertainment programming blended onto that network's schedule. Many stations owned by Innovate switched to other networks such as Estrella TV and Vision Latina.	
January 1	Stuart–West Palm Beach, Florida	WWHB-CD	48.1	Azteca America	TBD	On October 21, 2022, Innovate Corp, the company that owned Azteca America, announced that the network would cease operations on December 31, 2022. Prior to the announcement, TV Azteca had entered into a content and co-production agreement with competitor Estrella TV that will see its news and entertainment programming blended onto that network's schedule. Many stations owned by Innovate switched to other networks such as Estrella TV and Vision Latina.	
January 1	Tampa, Florida	WXAX-CD	26.1	Azteca America	beIN Sports Xtra	On October 21, 2022, Innovate Corp, the company that owned Azteca America, announced that the network would cease operations on December 31, 2022. Prior to the announcement, TV Azteca had entered into a content and co-production agreement with competitor Estrella TV that will see its news and entertainment programming blended onto that network's schedule. Many stations owned by Innovate switched to other networks such as Estrella TV and Vision Latina.	
January 1	Tampa, Florida	WTAM-LD	30.1	Azteca America	Estrella TV	On October 21, 2022, Innovate Corp, the company that owned Azteca America, announced that the network would cease operations on December 31, 2022. Prior to the announcement, TV Azteca had entered into a content and co-production agreement with competitor Estrella TV that will see its news and entertainment programming blended onto that network's schedule. Many stations owned by Innovate switched to other networks such as Estrella TV and Vision Latina.	
January 1	Tucson, Arizona	KUDF-LP	14.1	Azteca America	Estrella TV	On October 21, 2022, Innovate Corp, the company that owned Azteca America, announced that the network would cease operations on December 31, 2022. Prior to the announcement, TV Azteca had entered into a content and co-production agreement with competitor Estrella TV that will see its news and entertainment programming blended onto that network's schedule. Many stations owned by Innovate switched to other networks such as Estrella TV and Vision Latina.	
January 1	Tyler, Texas	KDKJ-LD	27.1	Azteca America	Timeless TV	On October 21, 2022, Innovate Corp, the company that owned Azteca America, announced that the network would cease operations on December 31, 2022. Prior to the announcement, TV Azteca had entered into a content and co-production agreement with competitor Estrella TV that will see its news and entertainment programming blended onto that network's schedule. Many stations owned by Innovate switched to other networks such as Estrella TV and Vision Latina.	
January 1	Westgate–Miami, Florida	W16CC-D	16.1	Azteca America	Infomercials	On October 21, 2022, Innovate Corp, the company that owned Azteca America, announced that the network would cease operations on December 31, 2022. Prior to the announcement, TV Azteca had entered into a content and co-production agreement with competitor Estrella TV that will see its news and entertainment programming blended onto that network's schedule. Many stations owned by Innovate switched to other networks such as Estrella TV and Vision Latina.	
January 1	Wilmington, North Carolina	WQDH-LD	49.1	Azteca America	Shop LC	On October 21, 2022, Innovate Corp, the company that owned Azteca America, announced that the network would cease operations on December 31, 2022. Prior to the announcement, TV Azteca had entered into a content and co-production agreement with competitor Estrella TV that will see its news and entertainment programming blended onto that network's schedule. Many stations owned by Innovate switched to other networks such as Estrella TV and Vision Latina.	
February 1	Santa Maria–San Luis Obispo, California	KCOY-TV	12.1	Dabl	Telemundo		
March 1	Phoenix, Arizona	KPHE-LD	44.1	LATV	Independent	On March 11, 2022, Gray Television (owner of CBS affiliate KPHO-TV and independent station KTVK) acquired KPHE-LD from Lotus Communications for $1.75 million; the sale was completed on May 4. Ten months later on January 25, Gray announced that it would convert KPHE into an independent station (branded as the "Arizona's Family Sports and Entertainment Network," the first part referencing KTVK/ KPHO's shared slogan that originated on the former in 2003) on March 1; the station airs simulcasts of most of KTVK/KPHO's newscasts, sporting events (such as Phoenix Rising FC soccer matches, selected games of which will be simulcast on either KTVK or KPHO during the USL regular season, and Arizona Interscholastic Association high school state championship games), and PowerNation-distributed sports and automotive programming. With KTVK, KPHE also serves as the television home of the Phoenix Mercury of the WNBA as of May, and the NBA's Phoenix Suns, beginning in October.	
July 27	Cincinnati, Ohio	WBQC-LD	25.1	Cozi TV	Telemundo		
August 28	Laughlin–Las Vegas, Nevada	KMCC	34.1	Ion Television	Independent	On May 4, as part of the announcement a deal that would bring the games of the National Hockey League's defending champion Vegas Golden Knights to the station starting that Fall (see that entry above), the E. W. Scripps Company announced that KMCC would convert into an independent station later in the year, offering syndicated entertainment programming, news (including local newscasts produced by ABC-affiliated sister KTNV as well as Scripps-distributed news programs), and local sports events. Ion programming moved to the second digital subchannel of KMCC.	
September 1	Salt Lake City, Utah	KUPX-TV	16.1	Ion Television	Independent		
September 1	Atlanta, Georgia	WUPA	69.1	The CW	Independent	On May 5, CBS News and Stations announced that the company would convert its eight CW-affiliated stations into independents on September 1, intending to fill prime time slots with locally produced programs (including news and live sports, with CBSNS likely to pursue rights to professional sports teams currently held by Bally Sports networks in those markets) and programming from other properties owned by parent company Paramount Global, which sold most of its 50% stake in The CW (as did original co-parent Warner Bros. Discovery, both of which retained 12.5% shares in the network) to Nexstar Media Group in October 2022. CW programming will move to other stations in the affected markets (four of which, Philadelphia, San Francisco, Sacramento and Tampa, are home to stations operated by Nexstar—WPHL, KRON, KTXL and WFLA/WTTA, respectively), while Nexstar partner company Mission Broadcasting is in the process of acquiring WADL in the Detroit market (that station would confirm its switch to The CW—replacing WKBD—through a promotional video posted on its website in late August). On June 14, Nexstar announced that MyNetworkTV affiliates WPHL, KRON and WTTA would switch to The CW on September 1, with MyNetworkTV programming either moving to a different timeslot or one of the stations' digital subchannels. CBS's stations in San Francisco and Pittsburgh will also change their callsigns in concert with the affiliation switch on September 1. On August 1, it was announced that KQCA would switch to The CW as part of a broader deal extending the network's affiliations with Hearst-owned stations in six other markets, with Nexstar station KTXL retaining the Fox affiliation. During the week of August 28, Gray Television—under a deal extending the network's affiliations in eight other markets—announced that WPCH (which had been operating as an independent since its 1967 sign-on and was the originating feed of TBS from 1976 to 2007) would replace WUPA as the network's Atlanta affiliate, while Sinclair Broadcast Group—as part of a renewal deal involving 18 other CW affiliates—agreed to assume the CW affiliations in Seattle (ABC affiliate KOMO-TV, which will become the network's largest subchannel-only affiliate by market size) and Pittsburgh (MyNetworkTV affiliate WPNT), in exchange for letting Nexstar assume the CW affiliation rights in Oklahoma City (which will move from KOCB to KAUT-TV).	
September 1	Atlanta, Georgia	WPCH-TV	17.1	Independent	The CW		
September 1	Detroit, Michigan	WADL	38.1	MyNetworkTV (retained as secondary affiliation)	The CW (primary affiliation)		
September 1	Detroit, Michigan	WKBD-TV	50.1	The CW	Independent		
September 1	Oklahoma City, Oklahoma	KOCB	34.1	The CW	Independent		
September 1	Oklahoma City, Oklahoma	KAUT-TV	43.1	Independent	The CW		
September 1	Philadelphia, Pennsylvania	WPHL-TV	17.1	MyNetworkTV	The CW		
September 1	Philadelphia, Pennsylvania	WPSG	57.1	The CW	Independent		
September 1	Pittsburgh, Pennsylvania	WPCW→WPKD-TV	19.1	The CW	Independent		
September 1	Pittsburgh, Pennsylvania	WPNT	22.1	MyNetwork TV	The CW		
September 1	Sacramento–Stockton–Modesto, California	KMAX-TV	31.1	The CW	Independent		
September 1	Sacramento–Stockton–Modesto, California	KQCA	58.1	MyNetworkTV (retained as secondary affiliation)	The CW (primary affiliation)		
September 1	San Francisco–Oakland–San Jose, California	KRON-TV	4.1	MyNetworkTV (retained as secondary affiliation)	The CW (primary affiliation)		
September 1	San Francisco–Oakland–San Jose, California	KBCW→KPYX	44.1	The CW	Independent		
September 1	Seattle–Tacoma, Washington	KSTW	11.1	The CW	Independent		
September 1	Tampa–St. Petersburg, Florida	WTTA	38.1	MyNetworkTV	The CW		
September 1	Tampa–St. Petersburg, Florida	WSNN-LD	39.1	Independent	MyNetworkTV		
September 1	Tampa–St. Petersburg, Florida	WTOG	44.1	The CW	Independent		
October 30	Detroit, Michigan	WADL	38.1	The CW (primary affiliation)	MyNetworkTV (former secondary affiliation)	Two months after affiliating with The CW, WADL removed the network as part of a compensation dispute before the close of the Mission sale. Four days later, Nexstar announced that WMYD would take over the affiliation as of November 13.	
November 13	Detroit, Michigan	WMYD	20.1	Independent	The CW	Two months after affiliating with The CW, WADL removed the network as part of a compensation dispute before the close of the Mission sale. Four days later, Nexstar announced that WMYD would take over the affiliation as of November 13.	
November 20	Phoenix, Arizona	KASW	61.1	The CW	Independent	A little over a month after sister station KNXV-DT2 acquired the rights to the Arizona Coyotes, the E. W. Scripps Company announced that KASW would become an independent to accommodate Scripps's local sports rights. KNXV-DT2 transitioned to carrying The CW on KASW's former pay-TV channel positions, with Antenna TV continuing to air at all other times.	
December 18	Bakersfield, California	KUVI-DT	45.1	Twist	Quest		

=== Subchannels changing network affiliations ===
Date	Market	Station	Channel	Prior affiliation	New affiliation	Notes	Source
January 1	Fremont–San Francisco, California	KEMO-TV	50.4	Azteca América	Timeless TV	On October 21, 2022, Innovate Corp, the company that owned Azteca America, announced that the network would cease operations on December 31, 2022. Prior to the announcement, TV Azteca had entered into a content and co-production agreement with competitor Estrella TV that will see its news and entertainment programming blended onto that network's schedule. TV Stations were notified on the closure and had switch affiliations to other networks. WTXX-LD, which was also an Azteca America affiliate moved its Timeless TV affiliation to the main subchannel as part of the closure, and WQDH-LD which was also an Azteca America affiliate moved its Shop LC affiliation to the main channel as part of the closure.	
January 1	Katy–Houston, Texas	KYAZ	51.3	Azteca América	MeTV+		
January 1	Lake Dallas–Dallas–Fort Worth, Texas	KAZD	55.3	Azteca América	MeTV+		
January 1	Los Angeles, California	KWHY-TV	22.2	Azteca América	Independent		
January 1	Lubbock, Texas	KNKC-LD	29.2	Azteca América	Infomercials		
January 1	Phoenix, Arizona	KMOH-TV	6.2	Azteca América	MeTV+		
January 1	Springfield, Massachusetts– Hartford, Connecticut	WTXX-LD	34.5	Timeless TV	ShopHQ		
January 1	Weslaco–Harlingen, Texas	KRGV-TV	5.2	Azteca América	Novelisima		
January 1	Wilmington, North Carolina	WQDH-LD	49.3	Shop LC	Lx		
February 1	San Francisco, California	KRON-TV	4.4	Quest	Charge!		
March 1	Greensboro–Winston-Salem–High Point, North Carolina	WGPX-TV	16.6	TrueReal	Scripps News		
March 1	Greensboro–Winston-Salem–High Point, North Carolina	WGPX-TV	16.7	Scripps News	GetTV		
March 1	Greensboro–Winston-Salem–High Point, North Carolina	WGPX-TV	16.8	HSN	TrueReal		
March 1	Greensboro–Winston-Salem–High Point, North Carolina	WMYV	48.2	GetTV	Rewind TV		
March 1	Danville–Lexington, Kentucky	WDKY-TV	56.4	TBD	Comet		
March 2	Belmont–Charlotte, North Carolina	WJZY	46.4	Movies!	Grit		
March 28	Albany–Schenectady–Troy, New York	WXXA-TV	23.3	Laff	Grit	E. W. Scripps Company announced on March 10 that programming from TrueReal would be folded into the schedule of sister multicast network Defy TV (see Closures above). The Scripps spectrum space TrueReal leaves behind will be leased by Scripps to the shopping channel Jewelry Television.	
March 28	Albany–Schenectady–Troy, New York	WYPX-TV	55.4	Grit	Laff	E. W. Scripps Company announced on March 10 that programming from TrueReal would be folded into the schedule of sister multicast network Defy TV (see Closures above). The Scripps spectrum space TrueReal leaves behind will be leased by Scripps to the shopping channel Jewelry Television.	
March 28	Albany–Schenectady–Troy, New York	WYPX-TV	55.6	TrueReal	Scripps News	E. W. Scripps Company announced on March 10 that programming from TrueReal would be folded into the schedule of sister multicast network Defy TV (see Closures above). The Scripps spectrum space TrueReal leaves behind will be leased by Scripps to the shopping channel Jewelry Television.	
March 28	Albany–Schenectady–Troy, New York	WYPX-TV	55.7	Scripps News	Jewelry Television	E. W. Scripps Company announced on March 10 that programming from TrueReal would be folded into the schedule of sister multicast network Defy TV (see Closures above). The Scripps spectrum space TrueReal leaves behind will be leased by Scripps to the shopping channel Jewelry Television.	
March 28	Appleton–Green Bay, Wisconsin	WACY-TV	32.5	TrueReal	Jewelry Television	E. W. Scripps Company announced on March 10 that programming from TrueReal would be folded into the schedule of sister multicast network Defy TV (see Closures above). The Scripps spectrum space TrueReal leaves behind will be leased by Scripps to the shopping channel Jewelry Television.	
March 28	Arlington–Dallas–Fort Worth, Texas	KPXD-TV	68.5	TrueReal	Scripps News	E. W. Scripps Company announced on March 10 that programming from TrueReal would be folded into the schedule of sister multicast network Defy TV (see Closures above). The Scripps spectrum space TrueReal leaves behind will be leased by Scripps to the shopping channel Jewelry Television.	
March 28	Arlington–Dallas–Fort Worth, Texas	KPXD-TV	68.6	Scripps News	Jewelry Television	E. W. Scripps Company announced on March 10 that programming from TrueReal would be folded into the schedule of sister multicast network Defy TV (see Closures above). The Scripps spectrum space TrueReal leaves behind will be leased by Scripps to the shopping channel Jewelry Television.	
March 28	Atlanta–Rome, Georgia	WPXA-TV	14.6	TrueReal	Scripps News	E. W. Scripps Company announced on March 10 that programming from TrueReal would be folded into the schedule of sister multicast network Defy TV (see Closures above). The Scripps spectrum space TrueReal leaves behind will be leased by Scripps to the shopping channel Jewelry Television.	
March 28	Atlanta–Rome, Georgia	WPXA-TV	14.7	Scripps News	Jewelry Television	E. W. Scripps Company announced on March 10 that programming from TrueReal would be folded into the schedule of sister multicast network Defy TV (see Closures above). The Scripps spectrum space TrueReal leaves behind will be leased by Scripps to the shopping channel Jewelry Television.	
March 28	Bellevue–Seattle, Washington	KWPX-TV	33.6	TrueReal	Scripps News	E. W. Scripps Company announced on March 10 that programming from TrueReal would be folded into the schedule of sister multicast network Defy TV (see Closures above). The Scripps spectrum space TrueReal leaves behind will be leased by Scripps to the shopping channel Jewelry Television.	
March 28	Bellevue–Seattle, Washington	KWPX-TV	33.7	Scripps News	Jewelry Television	E. W. Scripps Company announced on March 10 that programming from TrueReal would be folded into the schedule of sister multicast network Defy TV (see Closures above). The Scripps spectrum space TrueReal leaves behind will be leased by Scripps to the shopping channel Jewelry Television.	
March 28	Birmingham, Alabama	WIAT	42.4	TrueReal	Defy TV	E. W. Scripps Company announced on March 10 that programming from TrueReal would be folded into the schedule of sister multicast network Defy TV (see Closures above). The Scripps spectrum space TrueReal leaves behind will be leased by Scripps to the shopping channel Jewelry Television.	
March 28	Boston, Massachusetts	WBPX-TV	68.6	TrueReal	Jewelry Television	E. W. Scripps Company announced on March 10 that programming from TrueReal would be folded into the schedule of sister multicast network Defy TV (see Closures above). The Scripps spectrum space TrueReal leaves behind will be leased by Scripps to the shopping channel Jewelry Television.	
March 28	Bradenton–Tampa, Florida	WXPX-TV	66.6	TrueReal	Scripps News	E. W. Scripps Company announced on March 10 that programming from TrueReal would be folded into the schedule of sister multicast network Defy TV (see Closures above). The Scripps spectrum space TrueReal leaves behind will be leased by Scripps to the shopping channel Jewelry Television.	
March 28	Bradenton–Tampa, Florida	WXPX-TV	66.7	Scripps News	Jewelry Television	E. W. Scripps Company announced on March 10 that programming from TrueReal would be folded into the schedule of sister multicast network Defy TV (see Closures above). The Scripps spectrum space TrueReal leaves behind will be leased by Scripps to the shopping channel Jewelry Television.	
March 28	Bryan, Texas	KRHD-CD	40.3	TrueReal	Ion Television	E. W. Scripps Company announced on March 10 that programming from TrueReal would be folded into the schedule of sister multicast network Defy TV (see Closures above). The Scripps spectrum space TrueReal leaves behind will be leased by Scripps to the shopping channel Jewelry Television.	
March 28	Cedar Rapids, Iowa	KPXR-TV	48.6	TrueReal	Scripps News	E. W. Scripps Company announced on March 10 that programming from TrueReal would be folded into the schedule of sister multicast network Defy TV (see Closures above). The Scripps spectrum space TrueReal leaves behind will be leased by Scripps to the shopping channel Jewelry Television.	
March 28	Cedar Rapids, Iowa	KPXR-TV	48.7	Scripps News	Jewelry Television	E. W. Scripps Company announced on March 10 that programming from TrueReal would be folded into the schedule of sister multicast network Defy TV (see Closures above). The Scripps spectrum space TrueReal leaves behind will be leased by Scripps to the shopping channel Jewelry Television.	
March 28	Charleston–Huntington, West Virginia	WLPX-TV	29.6	TrueReal	Scripps News	E. W. Scripps Company announced on March 10 that programming from TrueReal would be folded into the schedule of sister multicast network Defy TV (see Closures above). The Scripps spectrum space TrueReal leaves behind will be leased by Scripps to the shopping channel Jewelry Television.	
March 28	Charleston–Huntington, West Virginia	WLPX-TV	29.7	Scripps News	Jewelry Television	E. W. Scripps Company announced on March 10 that programming from TrueReal would be folded into the schedule of sister multicast network Defy TV (see Closures above). The Scripps spectrum space TrueReal leaves behind will be leased by Scripps to the shopping channel Jewelry Television.	
March 28	Chicago, Illinois	WCPX-TV	38.6	TrueReal	Scripps News	E. W. Scripps Company announced on March 10 that programming from TrueReal would be folded into the schedule of sister multicast network Defy TV (see Closures above). The Scripps spectrum space TrueReal leaves behind will be leased by Scripps to the shopping channel Jewelry Television.	
March 28	Chicago, Illinois	WCPX-TV	38.7	Scripps News	Jewelry Television	E. W. Scripps Company announced on March 10 that programming from TrueReal would be folded into the schedule of sister multicast network Defy TV (see Closures above). The Scripps spectrum space TrueReal leaves behind will be leased by Scripps to the shopping channel Jewelry Television.	
March 28	Cleveland, Ohio	WEWS	5.4	TrueReal	Defy TV	E. W. Scripps Company announced on March 10 that programming from TrueReal would be folded into the schedule of sister multicast network Defy TV (see Closures above). The Scripps spectrum space TrueReal leaves behind will be leased by Scripps to the shopping channel Jewelry Television.	
March 28	Colorado Springs, Colorado	KZCS-LD	18.4	TrueReal	Jewelry Television	E. W. Scripps Company announced on March 10 that programming from TrueReal would be folded into the schedule of sister multicast network Defy TV (see Closures above). The Scripps spectrum space TrueReal leaves behind will be leased by Scripps to the shopping channel Jewelry Television.	
March 28	Columbia, South Carolina	WZRB	47.6	TrueReal	Scripps News	E. W. Scripps Company announced on March 10 that programming from TrueReal would be folded into the schedule of sister multicast network Defy TV (see Closures above). The Scripps spectrum space TrueReal leaves behind will be leased by Scripps to the shopping channel Jewelry Television.	
March 28	Columbia, South Carolina	WZRB	47.7	Scripps News	Jewelry Television	E. W. Scripps Company announced on March 10 that programming from TrueReal would be folded into the schedule of sister multicast network Defy TV (see Closures above). The Scripps spectrum space TrueReal leaves behind will be leased by Scripps to the shopping channel Jewelry Television.	
March 28	Concord–Manchester, New Hampshire	WPXG-TV	21.6	TrueReal	Scripps News	E. W. Scripps Company announced on March 10 that programming from TrueReal would be folded into the schedule of sister multicast network Defy TV (see Closures above). The Scripps spectrum space TrueReal leaves behind will be leased by Scripps to the shopping channel Jewelry Television.	
March 28	Concord–Manchester, New Hampshire	WPXG-TV	21.7	Scripps News	Jewelry Television	E. W. Scripps Company announced on March 10 that programming from TrueReal would be folded into the schedule of sister multicast network Defy TV (see Closures above). The Scripps spectrum space TrueReal leaves behind will be leased by Scripps to the shopping channel Jewelry Television.	
March 28	Conroe–Houston, Texas	KPXB-TV	49.5	TrueReal	Scripps News	E. W. Scripps Company announced on March 10 that programming from TrueReal would be folded into the schedule of sister multicast network Defy TV (see Closures above). The Scripps spectrum space TrueReal leaves behind will be leased by Scripps to the shopping channel Jewelry Television.	
March 28	Conroe–Houston, Texas	KPXB-TV	49.6	Scripps News	Jewelry Television	E. W. Scripps Company announced on March 10 that programming from TrueReal would be folded into the schedule of sister multicast network Defy TV (see Closures above). The Scripps spectrum space TrueReal leaves behind will be leased by Scripps to the shopping channel Jewelry Television.	
March 28	Des Moines–Newton, Iowa	KFPX-TV	39.6	TrueReal	Scripps News	E. W. Scripps Company announced on March 10 that programming from TrueReal would be folded into the schedule of sister multicast network Defy TV (see Closures above). The Scripps spectrum space TrueReal leaves behind will be leased by Scripps to the shopping channel Jewelry Television.	
March 28	Des Moines–Newton, Iowa	KFPX-TV	39.7	Scripps News	Jewelry Television	E. W. Scripps Company announced on March 10 that programming from TrueReal would be folded into the schedule of sister multicast network Defy TV (see Closures above). The Scripps spectrum space TrueReal leaves behind will be leased by Scripps to the shopping channel Jewelry Television.	
March 28	East St. Louis, Illinois– St. Louis, Missouri	WRBU	46.6	TrueReal	Jewelry Television	E. W. Scripps Company announced on March 10 that programming from TrueReal would be folded into the schedule of sister multicast network Defy TV (see Closures above). The Scripps spectrum space TrueReal leaves behind will be leased by Scripps to the shopping channel Jewelry Television.	
March 28	Franklin–Nashville, Tennessee	WNPX-TV	28.6	TrueReal	Jewelry Television	E. W. Scripps Company announced on March 10 that programming from TrueReal would be folded into the schedule of sister multicast network Defy TV (see Closures above). The Scripps spectrum space TrueReal leaves behind will be leased by Scripps to the shopping channel Jewelry Television.	
March 28	Grand Rapids, Michigan	WXMI	17.4	TrueReal	Defy TV	E. W. Scripps Company announced on March 10 that programming from TrueReal would be folded into the schedule of sister multicast network Defy TV (see Closures above). The Scripps spectrum space TrueReal leaves behind will be leased by Scripps to the shopping channel Jewelry Television.	
March 28	Greensboro–Winston-Salem–High Point, North Carolina	WGPX-TV	16.8	TrueReal	Jewelry Television	E. W. Scripps Company announced on March 10 that programming from TrueReal would be folded into the schedule of sister multicast network Defy TV (see Closures above). The Scripps spectrum space TrueReal leaves behind will be leased by Scripps to the shopping channel Jewelry Television.	
March 28	Greenville, North Carolina	WEPX-TV	38.6	TrueReal	Scripps News	E. W. Scripps Company announced on March 10 that programming from TrueReal would be folded into the schedule of sister multicast network Defy TV (see Closures above). The Scripps spectrum space TrueReal leaves behind will be leased by Scripps to the shopping channel Jewelry Television.	
March 28	Greenville, North Carolina	WEPX-TV	38.7	Scripps News	Jewelry Television	E. W. Scripps Company announced on March 10 that programming from TrueReal would be folded into the schedule of sister multicast network Defy TV (see Closures above). The Scripps spectrum space TrueReal leaves behind will be leased by Scripps to the shopping channel Jewelry Television.	
March 28	Greenville, North Carolina	WPXU-TV	35.6	TrueReal	Scripps News	E. W. Scripps Company announced on March 10 that programming from TrueReal would be folded into the schedule of sister multicast network Defy TV (see Closures above). The Scripps spectrum space TrueReal leaves behind will be leased by Scripps to the shopping channel Jewelry Television.	
March 28	Greenville, North Carolina	WPXU-TV	35.7	Scripps News	Jewelry Television	E. W. Scripps Company announced on March 10 that programming from TrueReal would be folded into the schedule of sister multicast network Defy TV (see Closures above). The Scripps spectrum space TrueReal leaves behind will be leased by Scripps to the shopping channel Jewelry Television.	
March 28	Jellico–Knoxville, Tennessee	WPXK-TV	54.5	TrueReal	Scripps News	E. W. Scripps Company announced on March 10 that programming from TrueReal would be folded into the schedule of sister multicast network Defy TV (see Closures above). The Scripps spectrum space TrueReal leaves behind will be leased by Scripps to the shopping channel Jewelry Television.	
March 28	Jellico–Knoxville, Tennessee	WPXK-TV	54.6	Scripps News	Jewelry Television	E. W. Scripps Company announced on March 10 that programming from TrueReal would be folded into the schedule of sister multicast network Defy TV (see Closures above). The Scripps spectrum space TrueReal leaves behind will be leased by Scripps to the shopping channel Jewelry Television.	
March 28	Kenosha–Milwaukee, Wisconsin	WPXE-TV	55.6	TrueReal	Jewelry Television	E. W. Scripps Company announced on March 10 that programming from TrueReal would be folded into the schedule of sister multicast network Defy TV (see Closures above). The Scripps spectrum space TrueReal leaves behind will be leased by Scripps to the shopping channel Jewelry Television.	
March 28	Las Vegas–Laughlin, Nevada	KMCC	34.6	TrueReal	Grit	E. W. Scripps Company announced on March 10 that programming from TrueReal would be folded into the schedule of sister multicast network Defy TV (see Closures above). The Scripps spectrum space TrueReal leaves behind will be leased by Scripps to the shopping channel Jewelry Television.	
March 28	Las Vegas–Laughlin, Nevada	KMCC	34.7	Grit	Jewelry Television	E. W. Scripps Company announced on March 10 that programming from TrueReal would be folded into the schedule of sister multicast network Defy TV (see Closures above). The Scripps spectrum space TrueReal leaves behind will be leased by Scripps to the shopping channel Jewelry Television.	
March 28	Lewiston–Portland, Maine	WIPL	35.6	TrueReal	Scripps News	E. W. Scripps Company announced on March 10 that programming from TrueReal would be folded into the schedule of sister multicast network Defy TV (see Closures above). The Scripps spectrum space TrueReal leaves behind will be leased by Scripps to the shopping channel Jewelry Television.	
March 28	Lewiston–Portland, Maine	WIPL	35.7	Scripps News	Jewelry Television	E. W. Scripps Company announced on March 10 that programming from TrueReal would be folded into the schedule of sister multicast network Defy TV (see Closures above). The Scripps spectrum space TrueReal leaves behind will be leased by Scripps to the shopping channel Jewelry Television.	
March 28	Los Angeles–San Bernardino, California	KPXN-TV	30.4	TrueReal	Laff	E. W. Scripps Company announced on March 10 that programming from TrueReal would be folded into the schedule of sister multicast network Defy TV (see Closures above). The Scripps spectrum space TrueReal leaves behind will be leased by Scripps to the shopping channel Jewelry Television.	
March 28	Los Angeles–San Bernardino, California	KPXN-TV	30.5	Laff	Scripps News	E. W. Scripps Company announced on March 10 that programming from TrueReal would be folded into the schedule of sister multicast network Defy TV (see Closures above). The Scripps spectrum space TrueReal leaves behind will be leased by Scripps to the shopping channel Jewelry Television.	
March 28	Los Angeles–San Bernardino, California	KPXN-TV	30.6	Scripps News	Jewelry Television	E. W. Scripps Company announced on March 10 that programming from TrueReal would be folded into the schedule of sister multicast network Defy TV (see Closures above). The Scripps spectrum space TrueReal leaves behind will be leased by Scripps to the shopping channel Jewelry Television.	
March 28	Melbourne–Orlando, Florida	WOPX-TV	56.5	TrueReal	Scripps News	E. W. Scripps Company announced on March 10 that programming from TrueReal would be folded into the schedule of sister multicast network Defy TV (see Closures above). The Scripps spectrum space TrueReal leaves behind will be leased by Scripps to the shopping channel Jewelry Television.	
March 28	Melbourne–Orlando, Florida	WOPX-TV	56.6	Scripps News	Jewelry Television	E. W. Scripps Company announced on March 10 that programming from TrueReal would be folded into the schedule of sister multicast network Defy TV (see Closures above). The Scripps spectrum space TrueReal leaves behind will be leased by Scripps to the shopping channel Jewelry Television.	
March 28	Miami, Florida	WSFL-TV	39.4	TrueReal	Defy TV	E. W. Scripps Company announced on March 10 that programming from TrueReal would be folded into the schedule of sister multicast network Defy TV (see Closures above). The Scripps spectrum space TrueReal leaves behind will be leased by Scripps to the shopping channel Jewelry Television.	
March 28	New Orleans, Louisiana	WPXL-TV	49.6	TrueReal	HSN	E. W. Scripps Company announced on March 10 that programming from TrueReal would be folded into the schedule of sister multicast network Defy TV (see Closures above). The Scripps spectrum space TrueReal leaves behind will be leased by Scripps to the shopping channel Jewelry Television.	
March 28	New York City	WPXN-TV	31.6	TrueReal	Scripps News	E. W. Scripps Company announced on March 10 that programming from TrueReal would be folded into the schedule of sister multicast network Defy TV (see Closures above). The Scripps spectrum space TrueReal leaves behind will be leased by Scripps to the shopping channel Jewelry Television.	
March 28	New York City	WPXN-TV	31.7	Scripps News	Jewelry Television	E. W. Scripps Company announced on March 10 that programming from TrueReal would be folded into the schedule of sister multicast network Defy TV (see Closures above). The Scripps spectrum space TrueReal leaves behind will be leased by Scripps to the shopping channel Jewelry Television.	
March 28	Newport–Providence, Rhode Island	WPXQ-TV	69.5	TrueReal	Jewelry Television	E. W. Scripps Company announced on March 10 that programming from TrueReal would be folded into the schedule of sister multicast network Defy TV (see Closures above). The Scripps spectrum space TrueReal leaves behind will be leased by Scripps to the shopping channel Jewelry Television.	
March 28	Norfolk, Virginia	WPXV-TV	49.5	TrueReal	Laff	E. W. Scripps Company announced on March 10 that programming from TrueReal would be folded into the schedule of sister multicast network Defy TV (see Closures above). The Scripps spectrum space TrueReal leaves behind will be leased by Scripps to the shopping channel Jewelry Television.	
March 28	Norfolk, Virginia	WPXV-TV	49.6	Laff	Jewelry Television	E. W. Scripps Company announced on March 10 that programming from TrueReal would be folded into the schedule of sister multicast network Defy TV (see Closures above). The Scripps spectrum space TrueReal leaves behind will be leased by Scripps to the shopping channel Jewelry Television.	
March 28	Philadelphia, Pennsylvania– Wilmington, Delaware	WPPX-TV	61.5	TrueReal	Scripps News	E. W. Scripps Company announced on March 10 that programming from TrueReal would be folded into the schedule of sister multicast network Defy TV (see Closures above). The Scripps spectrum space TrueReal leaves behind will be leased by Scripps to the shopping channel Jewelry Television.	
March 28	Philadelphia, Pennsylvania– Wilmington, Delaware	WPPX-TV	61.6	Scripps News	Jewelry Television	E. W. Scripps Company announced on March 10 that programming from TrueReal would be folded into the schedule of sister multicast network Defy TV (see Closures above). The Scripps spectrum space TrueReal leaves behind will be leased by Scripps to the shopping channel Jewelry Television.	
March 28	Pittsburgh, Pennsylvania	WINP-TV	16.5	TrueReal	Scripps News	E. W. Scripps Company announced on March 10 that programming from TrueReal would be folded into the schedule of sister multicast network Defy TV (see Closures above). The Scripps spectrum space TrueReal leaves behind will be leased by Scripps to the shopping channel Jewelry Television.	
March 28	Pittsburgh, Pennsylvania	WINP-TV	16.6	Scripps News	Jewelry Television	E. W. Scripps Company announced on March 10 that programming from TrueReal would be folded into the schedule of sister multicast network Defy TV (see Closures above). The Scripps spectrum space TrueReal leaves behind will be leased by Scripps to the shopping channel Jewelry Television.	
March 28	Portland–Salem, Oregon	KPXG-TV	22.5	TrueReal	Scripps News	E. W. Scripps Company announced on March 10 that programming from TrueReal would be folded into the schedule of sister multicast network Defy TV (see Closures above). The Scripps spectrum space TrueReal leaves behind will be leased by Scripps to the shopping channel Jewelry Television.	
March 28	Portland–Salem, Oregon	KPXG-TV	22.6	Scripps News	Jewelry Television	E. W. Scripps Company announced on March 10 that programming from TrueReal would be folded into the schedule of sister multicast network Defy TV (see Closures above). The Scripps spectrum space TrueReal leaves behind will be leased by Scripps to the shopping channel Jewelry Television.	
March 28	Provo–Salt Lake City, Utah	KUPX-TV	16.6	TrueReal	Scripps News	E. W. Scripps Company announced on March 10 that programming from TrueReal would be folded into the schedule of sister multicast network Defy TV (see Closures above). The Scripps spectrum space TrueReal leaves behind will be leased by Scripps to the shopping channel Jewelry Television.	
March 28	Provo–Salt Lake City, Utah	KUPX-TV	16.7	Scripps News	Jewelry Television	E. W. Scripps Company announced on March 10 that programming from TrueReal would be folded into the schedule of sister multicast network Defy TV (see Closures above). The Scripps spectrum space TrueReal leaves behind will be leased by Scripps to the shopping channel Jewelry Television.	
March 28	Raleigh–Rocky Mount, North Carolina	WRPX-TV	47.4	TrueReal	Scripps News	E. W. Scripps Company announced on March 10 that programming from TrueReal would be folded into the schedule of sister multicast network Defy TV (see Closures above). The Scripps spectrum space TrueReal leaves behind will be leased by Scripps to the shopping channel Jewelry Television.	
March 28	Raleigh–Rocky Mount, North Carolina	WRPX-TV	47.5	Scripps News	True Crime Network	E. W. Scripps Company announced on March 10 that programming from TrueReal would be folded into the schedule of sister multicast network Defy TV (see Closures above). The Scripps spectrum space TrueReal leaves behind will be leased by Scripps to the shopping channel Jewelry Television.	
March 28	Raleigh–Rocky Mount, North Carolina	WRPX-TV	47.6	True Crime Network	Jewelry Television	E. W. Scripps Company announced on March 10 that programming from TrueReal would be folded into the schedule of sister multicast network Defy TV (see Closures above). The Scripps spectrum space TrueReal leaves behind will be leased by Scripps to the shopping channel Jewelry Television.	
March 28	Roanoke, Virginia	WPXR-TV	38.6	TrueReal	Scripps News	E. W. Scripps Company announced on March 10 that programming from TrueReal would be folded into the schedule of sister multicast network Defy TV (see Closures above). The Scripps spectrum space TrueReal leaves behind will be leased by Scripps to the shopping channel Jewelry Television.	
March 28	Roanoke, Virginia	WPXR-TV	38.7	Scripps News	Jewelry Television	E. W. Scripps Company announced on March 10 that programming from TrueReal would be folded into the schedule of sister multicast network Defy TV (see Closures above). The Scripps spectrum space TrueReal leaves behind will be leased by Scripps to the shopping channel Jewelry Television.	
March 28	Sacramento, California	KSPX-TV	29.6	TrueReal	Scripps News	E. W. Scripps Company announced on March 10 that programming from TrueReal would be folded into the schedule of sister multicast network Defy TV (see Closures above). The Scripps spectrum space TrueReal leaves behind will be leased by Scripps to the shopping channel Jewelry Television.	
March 28	Sacramento, California	KSPX-TV	29.7	Scripps News	Jewelry Television	E. W. Scripps Company announced on March 10 that programming from TrueReal would be folded into the schedule of sister multicast network Defy TV (see Closures above). The Scripps spectrum space TrueReal leaves behind will be leased by Scripps to the shopping channel Jewelry Television.	
March 28	San Antonio–Uvalde, Texas	KPXL-TV	26.6	TrueReal	Scripps News	E. W. Scripps Company announced on March 10 that programming from TrueReal would be folded into the schedule of sister multicast network Defy TV (see Closures above). The Scripps spectrum space TrueReal leaves behind will be leased by Scripps to the shopping channel Jewelry Television.	
March 28	San Antonio–Uvalde, Texas	KPXL-TV	26.7	Scripps News	Jewelry Television	E. W. Scripps Company announced on March 10 that programming from TrueReal would be folded into the schedule of sister multicast network Defy TV (see Closures above). The Scripps spectrum space TrueReal leaves behind will be leased by Scripps to the shopping channel Jewelry Television.	
March 28	San Francisco–San Jose, California	KKPX-TV	65.6	TrueReal	Scripps News	E. W. Scripps Company announced on March 10 that programming from TrueReal would be folded into the schedule of sister multicast network Defy TV (see Closures above). The Scripps spectrum space TrueReal leaves behind will be leased by Scripps to the shopping channel Jewelry Television.	
March 28	San Francisco–San Jose, California	KKPX-TV	65.7	Scripps News	Jewelry Television	E. W. Scripps Company announced on March 10 that programming from TrueReal would be folded into the schedule of sister multicast network Defy TV (see Closures above). The Scripps spectrum space TrueReal leaves behind will be leased by Scripps to the shopping channel Jewelry Television.	
March 28	Scranton, Pennsylvania	WQPX-TV	64.6	TrueReal	Scripps News	E. W. Scripps Company announced on March 10 that programming from TrueReal would be folded into the schedule of sister multicast network Defy TV (see Closures above). The Scripps spectrum space TrueReal leaves behind will be leased by Scripps to the shopping channel Jewelry Television.	
March 28	Scranton, Pennsylvania	WQPX-TV	64.7	Scripps News	Jewelry Television	E. W. Scripps Company announced on March 10 that programming from TrueReal would be folded into the schedule of sister multicast network Defy TV (see Closures above). The Scripps spectrum space TrueReal leaves behind will be leased by Scripps to the shopping channel Jewelry Television.	
March 28	Sierra Vista–Tucson, Arizona	KWBA-TV	58.6	TrueReal	Jewelry Television	E. W. Scripps Company announced on March 10 that programming from TrueReal would be folded into the schedule of sister multicast network Defy TV (see Closures above). The Scripps spectrum space TrueReal leaves behind will be leased by Scripps to the shopping channel Jewelry Television.	
March 28	Syracuse, New York	WSPX-TV	56.6	TrueReal	Scripps News	E. W. Scripps Company announced on March 10 that programming from TrueReal would be folded into the schedule of sister multicast network Defy TV (see Closures above). The Scripps spectrum space TrueReal leaves behind will be leased by Scripps to the shopping channel Jewelry Television.	
March 28	Syracuse, New York	WSPX-TV	56.7	Scripps News	Jewelry Television	E. W. Scripps Company announced on March 10 that programming from TrueReal would be folded into the schedule of sister multicast network Defy TV (see Closures above). The Scripps spectrum space TrueReal leaves behind will be leased by Scripps to the shopping channel Jewelry Television.	
March 28	Tulsa, Oklahoma	KJRH-TV	2.5	TrueReal	Scripps News	E. W. Scripps Company announced on March 10 that programming from TrueReal would be folded into the schedule of sister multicast network Defy TV (see Closures above). The Scripps spectrum space TrueReal leaves behind will be leased by Scripps to the shopping channel Jewelry Television.	
April 1	Greensboro–High Point–Winston-Salem, North Carolina	WGHP	8.3	Court TV	Grit		
April 1	New York City	WPIX	11.3	Court TV	Grit		
April 1	New York City	WPXN-TV	31.3	Ion Mystery	Court TV		
April 1	St. Louis, Missouri	KTVI	2.3	Ion Mystery	Grit		
April 4	Charleston–Huntington, West Virginia	WOWK-TV	13.3	Laff	Grit		
April 4	Charleston–Huntington, West Virginia	WLPX-TV	29.4	Grit	Laff		
April 14	Grand Junction, Colorado	KLML	20.13	Twist	Antenna TV		
April 14	Idaho Falls–Pocatello, Idaho	KVUI	31.8	Laff	Rewind TV		
April 14	Twin Falls, Idaho	KBAX-LD	27.11	HSN	Rewind TV		
May 1	Philadelphia, Pennsylvania	WDPN-TV	2.2	Grit	Court TV		
May 1	Philadelphia, Pennsylvania	WPHL-TV	17.3	Court TV	Grit		
May 5	Birmingham, Alabama	WIAT	42.3	True Crime Network	Grit		
May 8	Oklahoma City, Oklahoma	KAUT-TV	43.2	Court TV	Rewind TV		
May 22	Mount Clemens–Detroit, Michigan	WADL	38.4	QVC	QVC2		
June 5	New Orleans, Louisiana	WNOL-TV	38.2	Court TV	Grit		
July 1	New York City	WLNY-TV	55.2	Charge	Comet		
August 28	Las Vegas, Nevada	KMCC	34.2	Bounce	Ion	Changes made because 34.1 became an Independent after agreeing to a deal for the television rights to the Vegas Golden Knights National Hockey League franchise.	
August 28	Las Vegas, Nevada	KMCC	34.6	Grit	Bounce	Changes made because 34.1 became an Independent after agreeing to a deal for the television rights to the Vegas Golden Knights National Hockey League franchise.	
September 1	Billings, Montana	KTVQ	2.2	The CW	Independent		
September 1	Billings, Montana	KSVI	6.2	Ion Mystery	The CW		
September 1	Billings, Montana	KSVI	6.3	Bounce TV	Ion Mystery		
September 1	Butte, Montana	KXLF-TV	4.2	The CW	Independent		
September 1	Great Falls, Montana	KRTV	3.2	The CW	Independent		
September 1	Missoula, Montana	KPAX-TV	8.2	The CW	Independent		
September 1	Seattle, Washington	KOMO-TV	4.2	Comet (retained as primary affiliation)	The CW (secondary affiliation)	See September 1 entry in stations changing network affiliations	
September 11	Phoenix, Arizona	KPHE-LD	44.2	FidoTV	Rewind TV		
September 11	Phoenix, Arizona	KPHE-LD	44.3	Infomercials	FidoTV		
October 2	Charlotte, North Carolina	WCCB	18.5	Antenna TV	Heroes & Icons		
October 2	Charlotte, North Carolina	WJZY	46.5	Heroes & Icons	TheGrio		
October 2	Charlotte, North Carolina	WJZY	46.7	TheGrio	Antenna TV		
October 9	Nampa–Boise, Idaho	KIVI-TV	6.2	Laff	Independent	Changes made to allow Vegas Golden Knights games to air on the newly independent subchannels	
October 9	Nampa–Boise, Idaho	KIVI-TV	6.5	GetTV	Laff	Changes made to allow Vegas Golden Knights games to air on the newly independent subchannels	
October 9	Twin Falls, Idaho	KSAW-LD	6.2	Laff	Independent	Changes made to allow Vegas Golden Knights games to air on the newly independent subchannels	
October 27	Indianapolis, Indiana	WXIN	59.3	Court TV	Rewind TV		
October 30	Kansas City, Missouri	WDAF-TV	4.3	Court TV	Rewind TV		
November 8	Wichita, Kansas	KAGW-CD	26.2	Carz & Trax	Rewind TV		
November 20	Phoenix, Arizona	KNXV-TV	15.2	Antenna TV (retained as primary affiliation)	The CW (secondary affiliation)	See November 20 entry in stations changing network affiliations	

== Deaths ==
=== January ===
Date	Name	Age	Notes	Source
January 1	Kelly Monteith	80	American comedian (several appearances on The Tonight Show Starring Johnny Carson), actor (guest appearances on Love, American Style and The Love Boat) and host (The Kelly Monteith Show, Hit Squad)	
January 5	Earl Boen	81	Character actor (Dennis Hubner on Making a Living, Reverend Lloyd Meechum on Mama's Family, voice of Chief Leonard Kanifky on Bonkers)	
January 5	Mike Hill	73	American film editor (Cagney & Lacey, The First Time, Baby Sister, Obsessive Love, Combat Academy)	
January 6	Lew Hunter	87	American screenwriter and producer (Fallen Angel, Desperate Lives, Otherworld)	
January 6	Annette McCarthy	64	American film, television and stage actress (Happy Days, Magnum, P.I., The Fall Guy, St. Elsewhere, The Twilight Zone, Riptide, Ohara, Beauty and the Beast, Night Court, Twin Peaks, Baywatch)	
January 7	Adam Rich	54	Actor (Nicholas Bradford on Eight Is Enough, voice of Presto the Magician on Dungeons & Dragons)	
January 8	Dorothy Tristan	88	American actress (Gunsmoke, Kojak, The Rookies, The Incredible Hulk, The Waltons)	
January 8	Bernard Kalb	100	Journalist for NBC News and CBS News, founding anchor for CNN's Reliable Sources from 1993 to 1998	
January 9	Lynnette Hardaway	51	Conservative contributor for Fox News and co-host of Diamond and Silk Crystal Clear on Newsmax TV	
January 11	Carole Cook	98	Actress (The Lucy Show, Here's Lucy)	
January 11	Charles Kimbrough	86	Actor best known as Jim Dial on Murphy Brown	
January 11	Ben Masters	75	Actor best known as Dr. Leo Rosetti on HeartBeat and Julian Crane on Passions	
January 13	Robbie Knievel	60	American daredevil (made guest appearances on CHiPs and Hawaii Five-0). Son of Evel Knievel.	
January 13	Yoshio Yoda	88	Japanese-American actor best known as Takeo Fujiwara on McHale's Navy, guest starred on Love, American Style	
January 14	Wally Campo	99	American actor (The Lawless Years, Bat Masterson, Berrenger's, The Fall Guy, First Monday)	
January 15	Bruce Gowers	82	Director, most notably on American Idol and the video for Queen's "Bohemian Rhapsody"	
January 15	C. J. Harris	31	Singer (contestant on American Idol season 13)	
January 16	Gina Lollobrigida	95	Italian actress, notably played Francesca Gioberti the sister of villainess Angela Channing in five episodes of Falcon Crest	
January 17	Jay Briscoe	38	Ring of Honor professional wrestler	
January 18	David Crosby	81	Musician (The Byrds, Crosby, Stills, Nash & Young), recurred on The John Larroquette Show, guest starred on The Simpsons, Roseanne, and Ellen	
January 20	Jerry Blavat	82	American radio disc jockey from Philadelphia (television appearances include The Mike Douglas Show, The Monkees, American Bandstand; appeared at numerous Philadelphia Thanksgiving Day parades)	
January 23	Lloyd Morrisett	93	American psychologist, founder of Children's Television Workshop, creator of Sesame Street	
January 24	Lance Kerwin	62	Actor best known as James Hunter on James at 15 and Mark Petrie on Salem's Lot	
January 25	Cindy Williams	75	Actress best known as Shirley Feeney on Happy Days and Laverne & Shirley	
January 26	Billy Packer	82	College basketball color analyst for CBS Sports and NBC Sports from 1974 to 2008	
January 28	Lisa Loring	64	Actress best known as Wednesday Addams on The Addams Family	
January 29	Annie Wersching	45	Actress known for series regular roles on 24, Bosch, and Runaways. Recurring roles include The Vampire Diaries, The Rookie, and Star Trek: Picard.	
January 30	Jeff Vlaming	63	Television writer and producer (The X-Files, Lois & Clark: The New Adventures of Superman, Xena: Warrior Princess, Northern Exposure and Hannibal)	

=== February ===
Date	Name	Age	Notes	Source
February 2	"Leaping" Lanny Poffo	68	Canadian-American professional wrestler (NWA, ICW, CWA, WWF); younger brother of "Macho Man" Randy Savage	
February 3	Jack Taylor	94	News anchor for WGN-TV/Chicago	
February 7	Tonya Knight	56	American bodybuilder; played Gold on American Gladiators	
February 7	Eugene Lee	83	American production designer for Saturday Night Live and the first four years of The Tonight Show Starring Jimmy Fallon	
February 8	Cody Longo	34	Actor best known as Nicholas Alamain on Days of Our Lives and Eddie Duran on Hollywood Heights	
February 13	Oliver Wood	80	British cinematographer best known for work on Miami Vice	
February 14	Jerry Jarrett	80	American professional wrestler (NWA); father of Jeff Jarrett	
February 15	David Oreck	99	Founder of Oreck Corporation (appeared in their many TV commercials and infomercials)	
February 15	Raquel Welch	82	Actress best known as Dianna Brock on Central Park West	
February 16	Tim McCarver	81	Hall of fame baseball player and broadcaster	
February 17	Gerald Fried	95	Composer (Gilligan's Island, Star Trek: The Original Series, Roots)	
February 17	Kyle Jacobs	49	American country music songwriter, husband of Kellie Pickler and co-starred with her on I Love Kellie Pickler.	
February 18	Barbara Bosson	83	Actress best known as Fay Furrillo on Hill Street Blues	
February 19	Richard Belzer	78	Actor best known as John Munch on Homicide: Life on the Street and Law & Order: Special Victims Unit and other shows in the Law & Order franchise plus guest spots as the character on several other shows	
February 19	Jansen Panettiere	28	Actor, best known for starring roles in the TV movies Tiger Cruise and The Last Day of Summer, guest appearances includes Casper on The Walking Dead and voice roles as Periwinkle on Blue's Clues and Truman X on The X's, brother of Hayden Panettiere.	

=== March ===
Date	Name	Age	Notes	Source
March 3	Sara Lane	73	Actress best known as Elizabeth Grainger on The Virginian	
March 3	Tom Sizemore	61	Actor best known as Lieutenant Sam Cole on Robbery Homicide Division	
March 7	Lisa Janti	89	Actress best known for roles in The Public Defender, Cheyenne, and other TV Westerns	
March 9	Robert Blake	89	Actor best known as Anthony Vincenzo "Tony" Baretta on Baretta	
March 15	Jeff Gaylord	64	American professional wrestler (UWF, WCCW) and football player (Toronto Argonauts)	
March 15	Norman Steinberg	83	Writer and producer (notable TV work including The Flip Wilson Show, Free to Be... You and Me, Doctor Doctor, and Cosby)	
March 16	Sharon Acker	87	Canadian actress best known as Della Street on The New Perry Mason	
March 17	Lance Reddick	60	Actor best known as Cedric Daniels on The Wire, Phillip Broyles on Fringe, and Irvin Irving on Bosch	
March 17	Hal Dresner	85	Screenwriter (The Harvey Korman Show, CBS Summer Playhouse, M*A*S*H)	
March 20	Michael Reaves	72	Writer (Batman: The Animated Series, The Real Ghostbusters, Teenage Mutant Ninja Turtles)	
March 21	Peter Werner	76	Television director (Ghost Whisperer, Medium, Law & Order: Criminal Intent)	
March 23	Rita Lakin	93	TV writer/producer (several shows including The Mod Squad, The Rookies, and Flamingo Road)	
March 25	Leo D. Sullivan	82	Animator (Fat Albert and the Cosby Kids, The Transformers, BraveStarr, The Incredible Hulk, The New Adventures of Flash Gordon, opening sequence on Soul Train)	
March 28	Bill Saluga	85	Comedian best known for his character Raymond J. Johnson Jr. (regular appearances on The Redd Foxx Show and in a series of Natural Light beer commercials, in addition to numerous guest appearances)	
March 30	Mark Russell	90	Comedian and political satirist known for correspondent work on Real People and for his own series of comedy specials on PBS	

=== April ===
Date	Name	Age	Notes	Source
April 2	Bushwhacker Butch	78	WWE Hall of Fame professional wrestler	
April 2	Judy Farrell	84	Actress best known as Nurse Able on M*A*S*H	
April 8	Elizabeth Hubbard	89	Actress best known for playing Lucinda Walsh on As the World Turns	
April 8	Michael Lerner	81	Actor best known as Sidney Greene on Glee	
April 18	Charles Stanley	90	Pastor and televangelist (In Touch)	
April 22	Len Goodman	78	English professional ballroom dancer and judge on Dancing with the Stars	
April 25	Harry Belafonte	96	Calypso musician, made guest appearances on series like The Ed Sullivan Show, The Smothers Brothers Comedy Hour, and The Muppet Show	
April 27	Jerry Springer	79	Former Cincinnati mayor, news anchor for WLWT/Cincinnati, and host of The Jerry Springer Show, America's Got Talent, and Judge Jerry	
April 29	Don Sebesky	85	Composer, arranger, and conductor (Allegra's Window, The Edge of Night, and Guiding Light)	
April 30	Ron Hazelton	81	Home improvement expert (host of Ron Hazelton's HouseCalls and several series for History Channel)	

=== May ===
Date	Name	Age	Notes	Source
May 1	Eileen Saki	79	Actress best known as Rosie on M*A*S*H	
May 6	Newton N. Minow	97	Federal Communications Commission chairman (noted for referring to commercial TV as a "vast wasteland" in a 1961 speech)	
May 7	John Roland	81	News presenter (WNYW, NBC News)	
May 7	Larry Mahan	79	Rodeo cowboy, had a role in the TV movie The Good Old Boys as Blue Hannigan	
May 9	Jacklyn Zeman	70	Actress best known as Bobbie Spencer on General Hospital	
May 11	Barry Newman	92	Actor (Petrocelli, Fatal Vision, Nightingales)	
May 14	Samantha Weinstein	28	Canadian actress best known for roles in TV films like The Winning Season and Maggie Hill, as well as roles in shows like Wild Card and Copper and voice work on Super Why!, The ZhuZhus, Let's Go Luna! and Dino Ranch	
May 15	Sharon Farrell	82	Actress best known as Florence Webster on The Young and the Restless	
May 17	Superstar Billy Graham	79	WWE Hall of Fame professional wrestler	
May 17	Ray Austin	90	British stuntman and director best known for work on Zorro and Magnum, P.I.	
May 18	Jim Brown	87	Football player (Cleveland Browns) and actor (I Spy, CHiPs, Knight Rider)	
May 18	Marlene Clark	85	Actress best known as Janet Lawson on Sanford and Son	
May 18	Dick Nourse	83	News anchor (KSL-TV)	
May 21	Ed Ames	95	Actor best known as Mingo on Daniel Boone	
May 21	Ray Stevenson	58	Northern Irish actor best known for roles in Rome and Dexter, as well as voice work on The Super Hero Squad Show and Star Wars: The Clone Wars	
May 22	Peggy Lee Leather	64	Professional wrestler (WWF, NWA)	
May 24	George Maharis	94	Actor best known as Buzz Murdock on Route 66 and Jonathon Croft on The Most Deadly Game	
May 28	Milt Larsen	92	Television writer (Truth or Consequences)	
May 30	John Beasley	79	Actor best known as Irv Harper on Everwood and Barton Ballentine on The Soul Man	

=== June ===
Date	Name	Age	Notes	Source
June 1	Anna Shay	62	Socialite, businesswoman, philanthropist, and television personality (Bling Empire)	
June 6	Pat Cooper	93	Actor and comedian (It's a Living, Charlie's Angels, Seinfeld)	
June 6	Paul Eckstein	59	Writer and producer (Godfather of Harlem, Narcos, Law & Order: Criminal Intent)	
June 7	The Iron Sheik	81	Iranian-born WWE Hall of Fame professional wrestler	
June 7	Tom Jolls	89	Weather anchor (WBES-TV, WBEN-TV and WKBW-TV, all in Buffalo, New York) and children's host (Commander Tom Show)	
June 8	Pat Robertson	93	Chairman and founder of the Christian Broadcasting Network and host of The 700 Club	
June 12	Carol Higgins Clark	66	Mystery author and actress (A Cry in the Night)	
June 12	Treat Williams	71	Actor best known as Dr. Andrew 'Andy' Brown on Everwood and Mick O'Brien on Chesapeake Shores	
June 12	Burns Cameron	85	Winner of the 1966 Jeopardy! Tournament of Champions	
June 15	Glenda Jackson	87	English actress and politician best known for appearances on The Muppet Show, American Playhouse, and Carol & Company	
June 16	Paxton Whitehead	85	English actor best known for guest appearances on major sitcoms of the 1990s like Frasier, Caroline in the City, 3rd Rock from the Sun, The Drew Carey Show, Mad About You, and Friends.	
June 19	Max Morath	96	Ragtime pianist, television presenter and author. Made guest appearances on series like Today and The Tonight Show.	
June 21	George Winterling	91	Television meteorologist (WJXT)	
June 23	Frederic Forrest	86	Actor (21 Jump Street, Lonesome Dove)	
June 24	Dean Smith	91	Track and field athlete, Olympic champion (1952), stuntman, and actor (Tales of Wells Fargo, Maverick, Gunsmoke, Lawman, Have Gun Will Travel, The Iron Horse and Walker, Texas Ranger)	
June 25	David Bohrman	69	Television executive (ABC News, CNN, Current TV)	
June 26	Nicolas Coster	89	British-American actor (known for work on the soap operas Another World, Santa Barbara, and All My Children, as well as on prime time series Lobo and guest roles on Wonder Woman, Buck Rogers in the 25th Century, T. J. Hooker, The Facts of Life and Star Trek: The Next Generation)	
June 28	Sue Johanson	93	Canadian sex educator and host of Oxygen's Sunday Night Sex Show and Talk Sex with Sue Johanson. Made guest appearances on the Late Show with David Letterman, The Tonight Show with Jay Leno, and Late Night with Conan O'Brien.	
June 29	Alan Arkin	89	Actor (Sesame Street, St. Elsewhere, Chicago Hope)	
June 29	Judi Farr	84	Australian actress (Farscape: The Peacekeeper Wars, Fatal Contact: Bird Flu in America, Camp)	
June 29	Don Kennedy	93	Radio broadcaster, television personality, and voice actor (Space Ghost Coast to Coast)	
June 29	Anita Wood	85	Singer and actress (The Andy Williams Show)	
June 30	Droz	54	Former WWF professional wrestler	

=== July ===
Date	Name	Age	Notes	Source
July 1	Frank Field	100	Television meteorologist (WNBC, WCBS-TV, WWOR-TV)	
July 1	Robert Lieberman	75	Television director (Thirtysomething, The X-Files, Brothers & Sisters)	
July 1	Lawrence Turman	96	Film producer (Get Christie Love!, The Morning After, Miracle on the Mountain: The Kincaid Family Story)	
July 6	Jimmy Weldon	99	Actor and ventriloquist best known for the voice of Yakky Doodle on The Yogi Bear Show	
July 8	Jeffrey Carlson	48	Actor and singer best known for playing transgender character Zoe Luper on All My Children.	
July 9	Manny Coto	62	Cuban-born television writer, director and producer (Star Trek: Enterprise, 24, Dexter, American Horror Story)	
July 9	Andrea Evans	66	Actress best known as Tina Lord on One Life to Live, Patty Williams on The Young and the Restless and Rebecca Hotchkiss on Passions	
July 10	Randy Fullmer	73	Animator (Sesame Street, BraveStarr, She-Ra: Princess of Power, Ghostbusters) and film producer	
July 11	Mantaur	55	Former WWF professional wrestler	
July 12	Daniel Goldberg	74	Canadian film producer and screenwriter best known for being the executive producer of Beethoven, Mummies Alive!, Extreme Ghostbusters, and Alienators: Evolution Continues	
July 13	Carlin Glynn	83	American singer and actress (Mr. President, A Woman Named Jackie, Day-O, Strange Luck, The Exonerated, Law & Order: Criminal Intent)	
July 13	Edward Hume	87	Television writer (The Day After, Barnaby Jones, The Streets of San Francisco)	
July 14	Nick Benedict	77	Actor (All My Children, The Young and the Restless, Days of Our Lives)	
July 16	Elise Finch	51	WCBS-TV meteorologist	
July 17	Sue Marx	92	Documentary film director and news producer (WDIV-TV)	
July 18	Stu Silver	76	Television writer (It's a Living, Webster, Soap)	
July 20	Bill Geddie	68	Television producer (The View)	
July 21	Jerome Coopersmith	97	Television writer (Hawaii Five-O)	
July 21	Tony Bennett	96	American singer and actor (The Simpsons and Muppets Tonight)	
July 23	Pamela Blair	73	Actress best known as Rita Mae Bristow on Loving	
July 23	Inga Swenson	90	Actress best known as Gretchen Kraus on Benson	
July 30	Betty Ann Bruno	91	Television reporter (KTVU)	
July 30	Paul Reubens	70	Actor best known as Pee-wee Herman on Pee-wee's Playhouse (which he also produced and directed) and cameos on several other shows as the character; non-Pee-wee roles included Murphy Brown, You Don't Know Jack, and Tron: Uprising	
July 31	Angus Cloud	25	Actor best known as Fezco "Fez" O'Neill on Euphoria	
July 31	Carol Duvall	97	Television host (The Carol Duvall Show)	

=== August ===
Date	Name	Age	Notes	Source
August 3	Mark Margolis	83	Actor best known as Hector Salamanca on Breaking Bad and Better Call Saul	
August 5	Arthur Schmidt	86	Film editor (Second Chance, Guess Who's Sleeping in My Bed?, The Jericho Mile, Tales from the Crypt)	
August 7	William Friedkin	87	Film director (CSI: Crime Scene Investigation). He made guest appearances in The Simpsons and others.	
August 8	Johnny Hardwick	64	Voice actor, comedian, writer, and producer best known for voicing Dale Gribble on King of the Hill	
August 8	Shelley Smith	70	Model and actress (The Associates, Murder, She Wrote, The Love Boat)	
August 14	Rich Landrum	74	Television broadcaster (WCW WorldWide)	
August 17	Rick Jeanneret	81	Canadian-American hockey announcer (Sabres Hockey Network and its TV partners Empire Sports Network and MSG Western New York, NHL on Fox)	
August 18	Nancy Frangione	70	Actress best known as Cecile DePoulignac on Another World	
August 19	Ron Cephas Jones	66	Actor (This Is Us, Luke Cage, Mr. Robot)	
August 20	David Jacobs	84	Television writer, producer and director (Dallas, Knots Landing, Paradise)	
August 21	Elizabeth Hoffman	97	Actress best known as Beatrice Reed Ventnor on Sisters	
August 23	Terry Funk	79	WWE Hall of Fame professional wrestler	
August 23	Hersha Parady	78	Actress best known as Alice Garvey on Little House on the Prairie	
August 24	Arleen Sorkin	67	Actress best known as Calliope Jones on Days of Our Lives and the voice of and inspiration for Harley Quinn on the DC Animated Universe. Also co-host of America's Funniest People from 1990 to 1992.	
August 24	Bray Wyatt	36	WWE professional wrestler	
August 26	Bob Barker	99	Game show host and animal rights activist best known for being the long-time host of Truth or Consequences from 1956 to 1975 and The Price Is Right from 1972 to 2007. Also hosted the Miss Universe and Miss USA pageants from 1967 to 1987.	
August 29	Don Browne	80	Television executive (Telemundo, NBC News)	
August 29	Robert Klane	81	Screenwriter, novelist and filmmaker. Wrote for several television shows including M*A*S*H and Tracey Takes On....	
August 31	Gayle Hunnicutt	80	Actress best known as Vanessa Beaumont on Dallas	

=== September ===
Date	Name	Age	Notes	Source
September 1	Jimmy Buffett	76	Singer-songwriter, made guest appearances on series like Saturday Night Live, Late Show with David Letterman, and Live! with Regis and Kelly	
September 2	Max Gomez	72	Cuban-born medical journalist for New York's WNBC and WCBS-TV	
September 2	Marcia de Rousse	70	Actress (True Blood, St. Elsewhere, Schooled)	
September 2	Shannon Wilcox	80	Actress (Dallas, Buck James, L.A. Law)	
September 3	Ruschell Boone	48	Jamaican-born journalist for New York City's NY1	
September 4	Steve Harwell	56	Lead vocalist for Smash Mouth. Was a featured cast member in the sixth season of The Surreal Life.	
September 6	Adnan Al-Kaissie	84	Iraqi-born professional wrestler and manager (AWA, WWWF, WWF)	
September 7	Geechy Guy	59	Stand-up comedian who competed on Star Search during the 1990–1991 season and on the sixth season of America's Got Talent.	
September 8	Felicia Taylor	59	News correspondent (CNN International) and anchor (WNBC/New York)	
September 10	Charlie Robison	59	Country singer-songwriter and judge of Nashville Star	
September 11	Dick Bertel	92	Radio and television personality (WFSB, Voice of America, NBC, WTIC Radio/Hartford)	
September 14	Michael McGrath	65	Actor (Mathnet, Between the Lions, and Madam Secretary)	
September 15	Billy Miller	43	Actor best known as Billy Abbott on The Young and the Restless and Drew Cain on General Hospital	
September 16	Irish Grinstead	43	Member of R&B group 702. Made cameos on Sister, Sister and Moesha along with the rest of her groupmates.	
September 20	Elaine Devry	93	Actress (Perry Mason, 77 Sunset Strip, My Three Sons)	
September 23	Nic Kerdiles	29	Ice hockey player (Anaheim Ducks) best known for appearing on Chrisley Knows Best	
September 25	David McCallum	90	Scottish-born actor best known as Illya Kuryakin on The Man from U.N.C.L.E. and Donald "Ducky" Mallard on NCIS	
September 27	Michael Gambon	82	Irish-English actor (The Jim Henson Hour, Samson and Delilah, Angels in America, and Luck)	

=== October ===
Date	Name	Age	Notes	Source
October 1	Tim Wakefield	57	Former baseball pitcher (most notably with the Boston Red Sox) and Red Sox TV analyst for NESN	
October 4	Shawna Trpcic	56	Costume designer (several series including Firefly, The Mandalorian, and Ahsoka)	
October 5	Dick Butkus	80	Hall of Fame football player (Chicago Bears) and actor (Blue Thunder, My Two Dads, Hang Time)	
October 6	Michael Chiarello	61	Celebrity chef best known for hosting Easy Entertaining with Michael Chiarello on Food Network and NapaStyle on Fine Living Network.	
October 8	Herschel Savage	70	Pornographic actor. Made appearances on shows like Just Shoot Me! and Are You There, Chelsea?.	
October 8	Burt Young	83	American actor (Roomies)	
October 9	Keith Giffen	70	Comic book artist and writer. Did storyboards for The Real Ghostbusters, Ed, Edd n Eddy, and Hi Hi Puffy AmiYumi	
October 9	Anthony Hickox	64	English film director and screenwriter best known for doing work on New York Undercover, Pensacola: Wings of Gold, and Martial Law	
October 9	Buck Trent	85	Country musician and television personality (Hee Haw).	
October 9	Allan Weisbecker	75	Surfer, novelist, and screenwriter (Crime Story, Miami Vice).	
October 10	Mark Goddard	87	Actor best known as Don West on Lost in Space	
October 10	Gail O'Neill	61	Model and correspondent on The Early Show	
October 11	Phyllis Coates	96	Actress best known as Lois Lane on Adventures of Superman	
October 12	Lara Parker	84	Actress best known as Angelique Bouchard Collins on Dark Shadows	
October 14	Piper Laurie	91	Actress best known as Catherine Martell on Twin Peaks	
October 15	Joanna Merlin	92	Actress best known as Judge Lena Petrovsky on Law & Order: Special Victims Unit	
October 15	Suzanne Somers	76	Actress best known as Chrissy Snow on Three's Company and Carol Lambert on Step by Step. Also appeared in commercials for the ThighMaster.	
October 20	Haydn Gwynne	66	English actress best known as Calpurnia on Rome	
October 21	Stephen Kandel	96	Television writer (Star Trek: The Original Series, Mannix, Wonder Woman)	
October 23	Harry Porterfield	95	Reporter/anchor for Chicago's WBBM-TV and WLS-TV	
October 24	Arnold Díaz	74	Journalist on New York City's WCBS-TV, WNYW, and WPIX	
October 24	Richard Roundtree	81	Actor best known as John Shaft on the Shaft TV movies	
October 26	Richard Moll	80	Actor best known as Bull Shannon on Night Court. Also the voice of Harvey Dent/Two-Face on Batman: The Animated Series and The New Batman Adventures and the voice of Norman on Mighty Max.	
October 26	Judy Nugent	83	Actress (The Ruggles, Adventures of Superman, The Tall Man)	
October 28	Matthew Perry	54	Actor best known as Chandler Bing on Friends. Also main/recurring roles on Second Chance, Growing Pains, Home Free, Studio 60 on the Sunset Strip, Mr. Sunshine, Go On, and The Odd Couple.	
October 30	Peter S. Fischer	88	Television writer (Murder, She Wrote, Columbo, Ellery Queen)	
October 31	Tyler Christopher	50	Actor best known as Nikolas Cassadine on General Hospital and Stefan DiMera on Days of Our Lives	

=== November ===
Date	Name	Age	Notes	Source
November 1	Bob Knight	83	Hall of Fame college basketball coach (Indiana Hoosiers, Texas Tech Red Raiders, 1984 Olympic team); later served as a college basketball studio analyst for ESPN from 2008 to 2015	
November 1	Peter White	86	Actor best known as Lincoln Tyler on All My Children.	
November 3	Robert Butler	95	Film and television director (The Untouchables, The Dick Van Dyke Show, Batman)	
November 5	Evan Ellingson	35	Actor best known as Kyle Harmon on CSI: Miami	
November 5	Pat E. Johnson	83	Actor (Rush Hour) and stunt coordinator (La Femme Musketeer) and utility stunts (Project Viper)	
November 6	Janet Landgard	75	Actress best known as Karen Holmby on The Donna Reed Show.	
November 7	Frank Borman	95	Astronaut (Gemini 7, Apollo 8). Was interviewed in the 2008 Discovery Channel documentary When We Left Earth: The NASA Missions and appeared in the 2005 documentary Race to the Moon, which was shown as part of the PBS American Experience series.	
November 10	John Bailey	81	Cinematographer (City in Fear, Passion, Always Outnumbered)	
November 11	Conny Van Dyke	78	Singer and actress (Adam-12, Nakia, Police Woman)	
November 12	Kevin Turen	44	Film and television producer best known for work on Euphoria and The Idol.	
November 15	Sandy Farina	68	Singer-songwriter. She appeared as a contestant on Star Search and was a session singer for television commercials.	
November 15	Ken Squier	88	NASCAR and motorsports announcer for ABC, CBS, and TBS	
November 17	Suzanne Shepherd	89	Actress best known as Mary DeAngelis on The Sopranos	
November 19	Joss Ackland	95	British actor (Queenie, A Woman Named Jackie, The Young Indiana Jones Chronicles)	
November 19	Peter Spellos	69	Voice actor (BattleTech: The Animated Series, Bureau of Alien Detectors).	
November 22	Tom Larson	84	Sportscaster for Boston's WSBK-TV and NESN	
November 22	Steve Pool	70	Television meteorologist for Seattle's KOMO-TV	
November 24	Elliot Silverstein	96	Television director (Naked City, The Twilight Zone, Route 66)	
November 25	Clarke Ingram	66	Historian and preservationist (Free the Kinescopes), DuMont Television Network expert, and radio personality	
November 25	Marty Krofft	86	Producer (with brother Sid Krofft) of several TV shows, including Saturday morning children's programs H.R. Pufnstuf and Land of the Lost	
November 26	Pablo Guzmán	73	Television reporter for New York City's WCBS-TV	
November 27	Victor J. Kemper	96	Cinematographer (The Atlanta Child Murders, Kojak: The Price of Justice, Too Rich: The Secret Life of Doris Duke)	
November 27	Frances Sternhagen	93	Actress best known as Esther Clavin on Cheers	
November 29	Henry Kissinger	100	Politician. He guest starred in episodes of Dynasty and Brother's Keeper.	

=== December ===
Date	Name	Age	Notes	Source
December 3	Andrea Fay Friedman	53	Actress best known as Amanda Swanson on Life Goes On	
December 5	Norman Lear	101	Television producer and writer (All in the Family, Maude, Good Times, Sanford and Son, One Day at a Time, The Jeffersons) and businessman (co-founder of Tandem Productions, TAT Communications and Act III Broadcasting)	
December 6	Jack Hogan	94	Actor best known as PFC William G. Kirby on Combat!	
December 6	Ellen Holly	92	Actress best known as Carla Gray on One Life to Live	
December 7	Stan Rogow	75	Television producer (Fame, Shannon's Deal, Lizzie McGuire)	
December 8	Ryan O'Neal	82	Actor best known as Rodney Harrington on Peyton Place	
December 9	Anna Cardwell	29	Reality television personality best known for appearing on Here Comes Honey Boo Boo	
December 10	Shirley Anne Field	87	English actress best known as Pamela Capwell Conrad on Santa Barbara	
December 11	Andre Braugher	61	Actor (Homicide: Life on the Street, Men of a Certain Age, Brooklyn Nine-Nine)	
December 11	Camden Toy	68	Actor (Buffy the Vampire Slayer, Angel, The Mentalist)	
December 13	Kenny DeForest	37	Stand-up comedian. Made guest appearances on Late Night with Seth Meyers and The Late Late Show with James Corden.	
December 14	Selma Archerd	98	Actress (Melrose Place, Charmed, Roseanne)	
December 17	James McCaffrey	65	Actor (Viper, New York Undercover, Rescue Me, Suits)	
December 18	Dan Greenburg	87	Writer (Mad About You, Steambath)	
December 23	Bobbie Jean Carter	41	Reality television personality best known for appearing on House of Carters	
December 23	Lynn Loring	80	Actress (Search for Tomorrow, Fair Exchange, The F.B.I.) and executive (Aaron Spelling Productions, MGM/UA Television)	
December 23	Mike Nussbaum	99	Actor (Gypsy, Early Edition)	
December 23	Richard Romanus	80	Actor best known as Richard LaPenna on The Sopranos	
December 24	Kamar de los Reyes	56	Puerto Rican actor best known as Antonio Vega on One Life to Live	
December 24	David Leland	82	British film and television director (Band of Brothers, The Borgias)	
December 26	Bobby Rivers	70	TV personality and film critic, best known for work with VH1 and Food Network as well as WISN-TV/Milwaukee	
December 26	Tom Smothers	86	Comedian, musician, and actor best known for hosting The Smothers Brothers Comedy Hour with his brother, Dick	
December 29	Maurice Hines	80	Actor (The Equalizer, Cosby)	
December 29	Sandra Reaves-Phillips	79	Actress, writer, and singer (Homicide: Life on the Street, Law & Order)	
December 30	Cindy Morgan	69	Actress (The Love Boat, CHiPs, Falcon Crest)	
December 30	Tom Wilkinson	75	British actor (John Adams, The Kennedys, The Kennedys: After Camelot, The Full Monty)	
December 31	Shecky Greene	97	Comedian. Guest-starred on shows like Love, American Style, Combat!, Laverne & Shirley, and Mad About You.	
December 31	Cale Yarborough	84	Race car driver and actor. He guest starred himself in The Dukes of Hazzard and Hee Haw.	
