= Chris Dane Owens =

American television producer

Chris Dane Owens (born October 9, 1963) is an American television producer, musician, actor, and filmmaker known for the film Empire Queen: The Golden Age of Magic.

== Career ==
Chris Owens is a television creator who received an Emmy nomination and one of his projects was Instant Beauty Pageant, which launched on the Style Network. Instant Beauty Pageant received a nomination for an Emmy. His portfolio includes the Animal Planet series Who Gets the Dog?. He formed the Biederman/Owens Entertainment company where he made 300 original works for reality TV and companies involved in the production of movies. Owens was the producer of the "Light Speed" music video. He released his song "Shine On Me" and the track appears as the end-credit song in the film Empire Queen: The Golden Age of Magic.

He also played a role of Commander Jade Cross in the movie Empire Queen: The Golden Age of Magic. Chris Owens discussed this film with the Society of Composers & Lyricists board member Cliff Eidelman.
