= Who Gets the Dog? =

"Who gets the dog (or cat)?" typically relates to the question of ownership of a pet in the event of a divorce or breakup.

Who Gets the Dog? may also refer to:

- Who Gets the Dog? (2007 film), a 2007 British one-off comedy-drama television film that aired on ITV
- Who Gets the Dog? (2016 film), a 2016 American film starring Alicia Silverstone
- Who Gets the Dog? (TV program), a 2005 American television program broadcast on Animal Planet
