= FidoTV =

- Country: United States

Programming
- Language(s): English

Links
- Website: fidotvchannel.com

FidoTV is an American digital cable channel that is dedicated solely to dog lovers. Programming on the channel features shows about dogs.

== Programming ==
- Who Gets the Dog? (TV program)
- Pick a Puppy
- The DogFather
- Send In the Dogs Australia
- End of My Leash
- Pet Heroes
- Pet Hair Eraser
- Tibor to the Rescue
- Puppy S.O.S.
- Which Woof's For Me?
