= TV One (American TV channel) =

American digital cable and satellite television channel

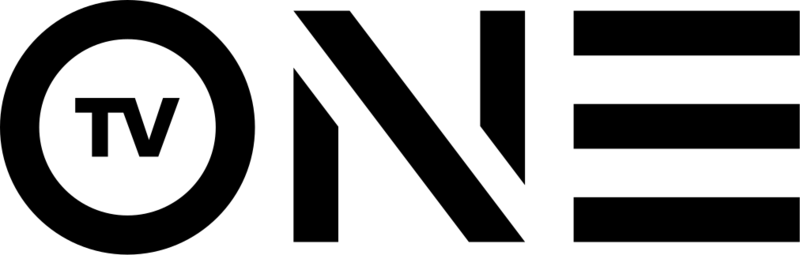
- Country: United States
- Broadcast area: Nationwide
- Headquarters: Silver Spring, Maryland

Programming
- Language: English
- Picture format: HDTV 1080i (downscaled to letterboxed 480i for the SDTV feed)

Ownership
- Owner: Urban One
- Sister channels: Cleo TV

History
- Launched: January 19, 2004; 22 years ago

Links
- Website: tvone.tv

TV One is an American basic cable television channel targeting African-American adults. It is owned by Urban One, and headquartered in Silver Spring, Maryland. Originally launched as a joint venture with Comcast, Urban One would acquire the former's stake in 2015.

As of November 2023, TV One is available to approximately 43,000,000 pay television households in the United States; down from its 2016 peak of 60,000,000 households. The channel is also an associate member of the Caribbean Cable & Telecommunications Association, Inc. (CCTA).

== History ==
=== Launch and early programming ===
Previous TV One logos

Used from launch in 2004 to August 2012

Used from August 2012 to February 2016

In January 2003, Radio One and Comcast announced an agreement to a joint venture to create a television network aimed at African Americans aged 25 to 54. TV One would launch on January 19, 2004, on Martin Luther King, Jr. Day, and was positioned as an older-skewing competitor to BET. At the time of its launch, the channel was in approximately 2.2 million homes in 16 markets. Initially launched in 2.2 million households, TV One's coverage would increase to 42.2 million homes by the end of 2007.

On July 7, 2008, the channel's president and CEO Johnathan Rodgers announced that TV One would provide extensive coverage of the Democratic National Convention that August.

In 2011, TV One's original co-owner Comcast acquired NBCUniversal, effectively integrating TV One and the other Comcast Entertainment Group channels into NBCUniversal's portfolio. Radio One's ownership stake in TV One would then grow from 36.8% to 50.8%.

=== Rebrand and programming shift ===
In August 2012, TV One updated its on-air look and logo, as part of a plan to "tell stories about how African-American life unfolds and to distinguish it from a growing number of competitors." By this point, TV One had reached 57.4 million homes.

On July 9, 2013, TV One announced that it would debut its first live one-hour, weekday morning news program that would be hosted by commentator Roland S. Martin. The program, NewsOne Now, premiered on November 4, 2013.

In December 2014, Brad Siegel was hired as president of TV One. Siegel was formerly president of Turner Entertainment Networks, and vice chairman of Up TV, which he co-founded in 2004.

In March 2015, Radio One announced a deal to buy out Comcast's 47.9% share of TV One for $550 million.

In February 2016, TV One updated their logo again, along with a new slogan: "Represent."

== Programming ==
As of 2024, TV One's current original programming includes true crime shows (such as Fatal Attraction and ATL Homicide), documentaries (including Unsung, the network's longest-running series), scripted films, and award show telecasts. The network previously produced reality shows, talk shows, and sitcoms.

TV One's main programming consists of reruns of popular Black sitcoms from the 1970s through the 2000s.

Cleo TV
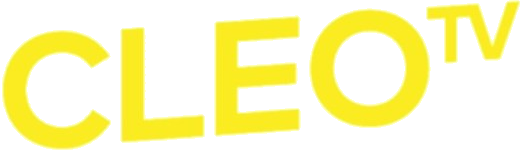
- Country: United States
- Broadcast area: Nationwide
- Headquarters: Silver Spring, Maryland

Programming
- Language: English
- Picture format: 480i (SDTV); 1080i (HDTV)

Ownership
- Owner: Urban One
- Sister channels: TV One

History
- Launched: January 19, 2019; 7 years ago

Links
- Website: https://mycleo.tv/

Cleo TV (stylized as CLEO^{TV}) is an American cable television network owned by Urban One targeting young millennial and Generation X African American women. It takes its name from the Ancient Egyptian Queen Cleopatra.

Cleo officially launched on January 19, 2019, after a week-long soft-launch period highlighting its programming offerings. At launch, Comcast Xfinity and Charter Spectrum served as the network's main debut base.

Cleo primarily airs original and acquired lifestyle programming. Original shows produced for the channel have included New Soul Kitchen, Lens of Culture, Cleo Speaks, and the Jazz and Jake Smollett-hosted Living by Design. Like TV One, Cleo TV also carries syndicated sitcoms, dramas, and Black film telecasts.
