= Elise Finch =

American television meteorologist (1972–2023)

- Born: February 24, 1972; Mount Vernon, New York, U.S.
- Died: July 16, 2023 (aged 51); New York City, U.S.
- Education: Georgetown University, BS, Syracuse University, MScBJ; Mississippi State University
- Occupation: Meteorology
- Spouse: Graig Henriques
- Children: 1

Elise Finch (February 24, 1972 – July 16, 2023) was an American television meteorologist with WCBS-TV New York City from 2007. Previously with NBC's Early Today, with the CBS Phoenix, Arizona affiliate KPHO, an anchor and reporter at the CBS and Fox Youngstown, Ohio affiliates WKBN and WYFX, and the ABC Austin, Minnesota affiliate KAAL. She started her television broadcasting career working behind the scenes at E! Entertainment Television.

== Career ==
Elise joined WCBS-TV in 2007 as its weekend meteorologist, in 2019 she was moved to weekday morning replacing John Elliot.

== Family ==
Finch married WCBS-TV photographer Graig Henriques at Untermyer Gardens in Yonkers, New York in August 2013 and welcomed daughter Grace in 2016.

== Death ==
Elise Finch died at a hospital in New York City on July 16, 2023, at the age of 51.
