= Gail O'Neill =

American fashion model, television journalist (1962–2023)

- Born: February 6, 1962; Westchester County, New York, U.S.
- Died: October 10, 2023 (aged 61)
- Education: Wesleyan University
- Occupations: Correspondent and host
- Title: fashion model, television journalist

Gail O'Neill (February 6, 1962 – October 10, 2023) was an American fashion model, born to Jamaican parents. She became a television journalist. As a fashion model, she was considered one of the elite black models in the world. She was on covers of leading fashion magazines and a part of the highly publicized Sports Illustrated Swimsuit Issue. As a journalist, she was a correspondent for a variety of U.S. networks. She was an original correspondent for The Early Show on CBS and also worked for CNN and HGTV.

A native of Westchester County, New York, O'Neill worked for Xerox after graduation as a marketing representative.

== Modeling ==
After graduating from Wesleyan University, she began an international modeling career that included appearances on the covers of Vogue and Mademoiselle, as well as catalogue work for companies such as J. Crew and Nordstrom. She was a spokesperson for Liz Claiborne. She was an A-list fashion model in the 1980s when she frequently appeared on fashion magazines. As a model she was known for refusing to appear in advertisements for cigarettes or for corporate sponsors that did not divest of South African investments. She appeared in the 1992 Sports Illustrated Swimsuit Issue. In the 1990s she was an activist for the homeless as part of the Black Girls Coalition with about twenty of the world's elite black supermodels.

== Journalism ==
O'Neill's journalism career included freelance work for numerous television networks. She was an original correspondent for CBS's The Early Show, which debuted in 1999, where she presented "Box Office Plus", a regular Monday feature. She had a reputation for being more skeptical and less of a cheerleader for the movie industry than her movie news correspondent peers on other networks.

Subsequently, she appeared as a host of CNN's weekly Travel Now series. She also served CNN as a correspondent covering other events.

From 2004 to 2006, she hosted HGTV's Mission Organization, where she matched professional organizers with those in need of organization and remodeling.

The White House has a tradition of inviting volunteers to assist with the holiday decorations. In 2005, they invited 50 volunteers. O'Neill hosted The White House Christmas 2005 for HGTV, and spoke with United States First Lady Laura Bush about the decorations and themes.

In 2008, she was mentioned in retrospectives lamenting the state of the fashion world for black models in magazines like Ebony and Italian Vogue. The July 2008 Vogue Italia carried the headline "A Black Issue" and was dedicated to issues related to a lack of diversity in the fashion modeling industry, especially print ads, runway shows, and fashion editorials. O'Neill was photographed by Steven Meisel in its first photo spread.

O'Neill continued to model actively even after making the transition to journalism, and she modeled for the 2009 Spring/Summer Calvin Klein ckOne fragrance campaign.

== Death ==
O'Neill died on October 10, 2023, at the age of 61. While the specific cause of O’Neill’s death is unknown, ArtsATL reported that she “had courageously fought a serious illness over the past two years.”
