= ATL Homicide =

American true crime TV series

- Genre: True crime
- Starring: David Quinn; Vince Velazquez; Christopher Diaz; Angelo Diaz

Production
- Production companies: Wide Net Productions; Jupiter Entertainment

Original release
- Network: TV One
- Release: July 9, 2018 – May 15, 2023

ATL Homicide is an American true crime television series that debuted on July 9, 2018 on TV One.

Retired Atlanta homicide detectives David Quinn and Vince Velazquez investigate crimes, from high-profile murders to everyday "who-done-its." These cases are retold via narration and re-enactment using actors.

== Production ==
On May 13, 2019, it was announced that the second season would premiere on June 17, 2019.

On January 20, 2021, it was announced that the third season would premiere on January 25, 2021.
