= Kenny DeForest =

American comedian (1986–2023)

- Born: April 23, 1986; Springfield, Missouri, U.S.
- Died: December 13, 2023 (aged 37); Brooklyn, New York, U.S.
- Occupation(s): Stand-up comedian, actor
- Years active: 2013–2023

Kenny DeForest (April 23, 1986 – December 13, 2023) was an American stand-up comedian and actor. He was included in the 50 Funniest People in Brooklyn by Brooklyn Magazine.

Born in Springfield, Missouri in 1986, he recorded his debut stand-up album B.A.D. Dreams with Comedy Dynamics on November 3, 2017. On August 17, 2023, he released his comedy special, Don't You Know Who I Am?, on YouTube.

DeForest died on December 13, 2023, at the age of 37, after being hospitalized for five days at the Kings County Hospital in New York City, where he had undergone neurological surgery. It was initially believed that he had collided with a car while on a bicycle, but according to Deadline, no other vehicle was involved in the crash.

== Appearances ==
- November 22, 2017: Late Night with Seth Meyers in S5 E31 as entertainment guest
- April 9, 2019: The Late Late Show with James Corden in Episode 619: Stage 56 Bar Tricks
- December 4, 2019: You Made It Weird with Pete Holmes
