= Who Gets the Dog? (TV program) =

American television program

Who Gets the Dog? is an American television program broadcast on Animal Planet in 2005 in which three couples would compete for a chance to adopt a dog that had been rescued from a shelter by the producers of the program. Toward that end, each couple would take the dog home for a night and their experiences would be made into a video. The program was hosted by Dorothea Coelho who was joined by a panel of three "experts" whose job it was to review the video footage of the dog at home with each of the couples and decide where the dog would be placed. Fifteen episodes of the program were produced. The experts were Dr. Dean Graulich, a veterinarian; Tamar Geller, a professional dog behaviorist; and Merrill Markoe, a humorist/ dog lover.
