= 2022–23 United States network television schedule =

Television schedule for the fall of 2022

The 2022–23 network television schedule for the five major English-language commercial broadcast networks that air in the United States covers the prime time hours from September 2022 to August 2023. The schedule is followed by a list per network of returning series, new series, and series canceled after the 2021–22 television season. The schedule was affected by strikes undertaken by the Writers Guild of America (which began on May 2 and ended on September 27) and SAG-AFTRA (which began on July 14 and ended on November 9), marking the first television season since the 1959–60 season that was affected by two simultaneous strikes; however because the strikes commenced in May and July, respectively, programming impacts on the 2022–23 season itself were limited in comparison to previous television seasons affected by Hollywood labor disputes as the next season was affected even more.

NBC was the first to announce its fall schedule on May 16, 2022, via press release, followed by an upfront presentation to advertisers at 11:00 a.m. Eastern Time. ABC announced its fall schedule on May 17 (with an upfront presentation at 4:00 p.m. that day), followed by CBS on May 18 (with their upfront presentation at 4:00 p.m. that day), and The CW on May 19 (with their upfront presentation at 11:00 a.m. that day). Fox announced its programming on May 16 shortly after NBC (with their upfront presentation at 4:00 p.m. that day), but released its prime-time schedule (along with their premiere dates) on June 6.

This would be the final season that CBS News and Stations was affiliated with The CW, as Nexstar Media Group assumed operations on August 15, 2022, and acquired a 75-percent ownership stake on October 3, 2022; former joint owners Paramount Global and Warner Bros. Discovery retained a 25-percent stake, split at nominal 12.5-percent stakes for both companies. Under the agreement, Paramount was given a right with the transaction to disaffiliate all eight of their CW affiliates, which was exercised on May 5, 2023.

PBS is not included, as member television stations have local flexibility over most of their schedules and broadcast times for network shows may vary. Ion Television and MyNetworkTV are also not included as both networks' schedules feature syndicated reruns (with limited original programming on the latter).

Each of the 30 highest-rated shows released in May 2023 is listed with its rank and rating as determined by Nielsen Media Research.

New series to broadcast television are highlighted in bold.

Repeat airings or same-day rebroadcasts are indicated by (R).

All times are U.S. Eastern and Pacific Time (except for some live sports or events). Subtract one hour for Central, Mountain, Alaska, and Hawaii–Aleutian times.

All sporting events air live in all time zones in U.S. Eastern time, with local and/or late-night programming (including Fox affiliates during the 10 p.m. ET/PT hour) by affiliates after game completion.

During the NFL season (excluding games on broadcast networks, with ABC and/or Hearst affiliates having first refusal on games broadcast by ESPN (due to ABC being owned by the same company as ESPN, and Hearst owned 20% stake on ESPN), therefore its primetime programming from its respective network may be delayed or moved to another sister station to air live), the NFL policy on ESPN Monday Night Football, Thursday Night Football, NFL Network Exclusive Game Series and any game exclusively airing on Peacock and ESPN+ will affect the 31 primary markets (30 markets with NFL teams and Milwaukee, WI). The NFL sells syndication rights to the cable and streaming-only games to local broadcasters in the home and away teams' primary markets to maximize ratings.

During the NFL preseason, some affiliates may not air their respective primetime programming due to their local NFL team games and may choose to put its network's programming on a sister channel to air live, delay the program to air later on the network or preempt the shows entirely.

== Impact of the 2023 Writers Guild of America and SAG-AFTRA strikes ==
On May 2, the Writers Guild of America went on strike, followed by SAG-AFTRA on July 13. The absence of working writers and actors through the summer has led scripted television production to shut down completely. The Writers Guild of America strike ended on September 27, while the SAG-AFTRA strike ended on November 9.

The vast majority of scripted primetime network series had already completed filming for the season by the end of April and aired as scheduled, but daytime and late night topical programs employing WGA writers such as Saturday Night Live and Jimmy Kimmel Live! went into repeats from May 2 onwards. Some unscripted programs that have typically aired during the summer, including Big Brother, were rescheduled to start later in the summer, which media outlets speculated was intended to help the networks manage the effects of the strikes.

== Legend ==
- Light blue indicates local programming.
- Gray indicates encore programming.
- Blue-gray indicates news programming.
- Light green indicates sporting events.
- Red indicates series being burned off and other irregularly scheduled programs, including specials and movies.
- Light gold indicates programming produced outside of the United States.
- highlight Yellow highlights indicates the top-10 most watched programs of the season.
- highlight Cyan highlights indicates numbers 11-20 most watched programs of the season.
- highlight Magenta highlights indicates numbers 21-30 most watched programs of the season.
- highlight Highlights indicates that it falls in multiple of the above categories.

== Sunday ==
Network		7:00 p.m.	7:30 p.m.	8:00 p.m.	8:30 p.m.	9:00 p.m.	9:30 p.m.	10:00 p.m.	10:30 p.m.
ABC	Fall	America's Funniest Home Videos		**Celebrity Jeopardy!**		Celebrity Wheel of Fortune		The Rookie (24/6.48)	
ABC	Winter	America's Funniest Home Videos		The Wonderful World of Disney					Various programming
ABC	Mid-winter	America's Funniest Home Videos		American Idol (20/6.79) (Tied with East New York)				**The Company You Keep**	
ABC	Spring	America's Funniest Home Videos (R)				The Wonderful World of Disney			
ABC	Summer	America's Funniest Home Videos (R)		**The Prank Panel**		Celebrity Family Feud		The $100,000 Pyramid	
ABC	Mid-summer	America's Funniest Home Videos (R)		Celebrity Family Feud		The $100,000 Pyramid		The $100,000 Pyramid (R)	
ABC	Late summer	America's Funniest Home Videos (R)							
CBS	Fall	NFL on CBS (4:25 p.m.)	60 Minutes (8/8.80)		The Equalizer (10/8.28)		**East New York** (20/6.79) (Tied with American Idol)		NCIS: Los Angeles (continued until 11:30 p.m.) (29/6.15)
CBS	Late fall	NFL on CBS (4:25 p.m.)	60 Minutes (8/8.80)		CBS Sunday Night Movies				**East New York** (R) (continued until 11:30 p.m.)
CBS	Winter	60 Minutes (8/8.80)		The Equalizer (10/8.28)		**East New York** (20/6.79) (Tied with American Idol)		NCIS: Los Angeles (29/6.15)	
CBS	Spring	60 Minutes (8/8.80)		Tough as Nails		The Equalizer (R)		NCIS: Los Angeles (29/6.15)	
CBS	Summer	60 Minutes (8/8.80)		Big Brother		The Challenge: USA		NCIS: Los Angeles (29/6.15)	
The CW	Fall	Local programming		**Family Law**		Coroner		Local programming	
The CW	Winter	Local programming		World's Funniest Animals (R)		Whose Line Is It Anyway? (R)		Local programming	
The CW	Spring	Local programming		Penn & Teller: Fool Us (R)		Whose Line Is It Anyway? (R)	**The Great American Joke Off** (R)	Local programming	
The CW	Mid-spring	Local programming		**100 Days to Indy** (R)		Whose Line Is It Anyway? (R)	**The Great American Joke Off** (R)	Local programming	
The CW	Summer	Local programming		**The Chosen** (R) (Note: On select weeks when The Chosen airs regular 60-minute episodes at 8:00 p.m., an additional episode of World's Funniest Animals will air at 9:00 p.m. on top of its regular 9:30 p.m. airing.)			World's Funniest Animals (R)	Local programming	
Fox	Fall	Fox NFL (4:25 p.m.)	The OT	The Simpsons	The Great North	Bob's Burgers	Family Guy	Local programming	
Fox	Winter	Fox NFL (4:25 p.m.)	The OT	Fox Sports programming				Local programming	
Fox	Late winter	Next Level Chef (R)		The Simpsons	The Great North	Bob's Burgers	Family Guy	Local programming	
Fox	Spring	Next Level Chef (R)		The Simpsons	The Great North	Bob's Burgers	HouseBroken	Local programming	
Fox	Late spring	USFL on Fox						Local programming	
Fox	Summer	**Gordon Ramsay's Food Stars** (R)		The Simpsons (R)	Family Guy (R)	HouseBroken		Local programming	
Fox	Mid-summer	**Gordon Ramsay's Food Stars** (R)		The Simpsons (R)	Family Guy (R)	Bob's Burgers (R)	Family Guy (R)	Local programming	
NBC	Fall	Football Night in America		NBC Sunday Night Football (8:20 p.m.) (1/18.13)					
NBC	Winter	Various programming				**America's Got Talent: All-Stars** (R)			
NBC	Late winter	Dateline Weekend Mystery				Magnum P.I.		The Blacklist	
NBC	Spring	NBC Sports programming				America's Got Talent (R)			
NBC	Summer	American Ninja Warrior (R)				America's Got Talent (R)			

== Monday ==
Network		8:00 p.m.	8:30 p.m.	9:00 p.m.	9:30 p.m.	10:00 p.m.	10:30 p.m.
ABC	Fall	Monday Night Countdown	Monday Night Football (8:15 p.m.)				
ABC	Mid-fall	Bachelor in Paradise				The Good Doctor (28/6.23)	
ABC	Late fall	The Great Christmas Light Fight				The Good Doctor (28/6.23)	
ABC	Winter	Monday Night Countdown	Monday Night Football (8:15 p.m.)				
ABC	Mid-winter	The Bachelor				The Good Doctor (28/6.23)	
ABC	Spring	American Idol				The Good Doctor (28/6.23)	
ABC	Mid-spring	**Jeopardy! Masters** (27/6.35)		Various programming			
ABC	Late spring	Celebrity Family Feud (R)					
ABC	Summer	Claim to Fame		The Bachelorette			
ABC	Mid-summer	The Bachelorette				Claim to Fame	
CBS	Fall	The Neighborhood (25/6.45)	Bob Hearts Abishola (30/6.10)	NCIS (2/9.83)		NCIS: Hawaiʻi (15/7.50)	
CBS	Summer	The Neighborhood (25/6.45)	Bob Hearts Abishola (30/6.10)	NCIS: Hawaiʻi (R)		NCIS: Los Angeles (R)	
The CW	Fall	All American		All American: Homecoming		Local programming	
The CW	Spring	All American		The Flash (R)		Local programming	
The CW	Late spring	**The Rising**		**Barons**		Local programming	
The CW	Summer	**The Rising**		Nancy Drew (R)		Local programming	
The CW	Mid-summer	**Son of a Critch**	**Run the Burbs**	**Children Ruin Everything** (R)	Bump	Local programming	
The CW	Late summer	**Son of a Critch**	**Run the Burbs**	**Children Ruin Everything** (R)	Whose Line Is It Anyway? (R)	Local programming	
Fox	Fall	9-1-1 (18/7.09)		The Cleaning Lady		Local programming	
Fox	Winter	Fantasy Island		**Alert: Missing Persons Unit**		Local programming	
Fox	Late winter	9-1-1 (18/7.09)		Fantasy Island		Local programming	
Fox	Spring	**Stars on Mars**		Crime Scene Kitchen		Local programming	
Fox	Summer	**Stars on Mars**		MasterChef (R)		Local programming	
NBC	Fall	The Voice (16/7.30)				**Quantum Leap**	
NBC	Winter	**America's Got Talent: All-Stars**				**Quantum Leap**	
NBC	Late winter	The Voice (16/7.30)				**Quantum Leap**	
NBC	Spring	The Voice (16/7.30)				That's My Jam	
NBC	Late spring	American Ninja Warrior		The Wall		Weakest Link	
NBC	Summer	American Ninja Warrior				Weakest Link	

== Tuesday ==
Network		8:00 p.m.	8:30 p.m.	9:00 p.m.	9:30 p.m.	10:00 p.m.	10:30 p.m.
ABC	Fall	Bachelor in Paradise				**The Rookie: Feds**	
ABC	Winter	The Rookie (24/6.48)		**The Rookie: Feds**		**Will Trent**	
ABC	Spring	**Jeopardy! Masters** (27/6.35)		Judge Steve Harvey		Celebrity Family Feud (R)	
ABC	Late spring	Celebrity Wheel of Fortune (R)		**Celebrity Jeopardy!** (R)		Shark Tank (R)	
ABC	Summer	Celebrity Wheel of Fortune (R)		**Jeopardy! Masters** (R)		The Chase (R)	
ABC	Late summer	Celebrity Family Feud (R)		**Jeopardy! Masters** (R)		The Chase (R)	
CBS		FBI (3/9.52)		FBI: International (14/7.72)		FBI: Most Wanted (13/8.00)	
The CW	Fall	**The Winchesters**		**Professionals**		Local programming	
The CW	Winter	**The Winchesters** (R)		**The Winchesters**		Local programming	
The CW	Mid-winter	**The Winchesters**		The Flash (R)		Local programming	
The CW	Late winter	Superman & Lois		**Gotham Knights**		Local programming	
The CW	Summer	**Down to Earth with Zac Efron** (R)		**Fantastic Friends**		Local programming	
The CW	Mid-summer	Penn & Teller: Fool Us (R)		Whose Line Is It Anyway? (R)		Local programming	
Fox	Fall	The Resident		**Monarch**		Local programming	
Fox	Winter	9-1-1: Lone Star		**Accused**		Local programming	
Fox	Spring	Beat Shazam		Don't Forget the Lyrics!		Local programming	
NBC	Fall	The Voice (17/7.21)		La Brea		New Amsterdam	
NBC	Winter	**Night Court**	American Auto	La Brea			
NBC	Late winter	**Night Court**	American Auto	The Voice (17/7.21)		That's My Jam	
NBC	Spring	**Night Court**	**Lopez vs Lopez**	The Wall		Weakest Link	
NBC	Late spring	America's Got Talent				**Hot Wheels: Ultimate Challenge**	
NBC	Summer	America's Got Talent				**Quantum Leap** (R)	

== Wednesday ==
Network		8:00 p.m.	8:30 p.m.	9:00 p.m.	9:30 p.m.	10:00 p.m.	10:30 p.m.
ABC	Fall	The Conners	The Goldbergs	Abbott Elementary	Home Economics	Big Sky	
ABC	Winter	The Conners	The Goldbergs	Abbott Elementary	**Not Dead Yet**	A Million Little Things	
ABC	Spring	**Jeopardy! Masters** (27/6.35)		Various programming		**The Game Show Show**	
ABC	Late spring	Judge Steve Harvey		The Wonder Years	Abbott Elementary (R)	The $100,000 Pyramid (R)	
ABC	Summer	Judge Steve Harvey		The Wonder Years	Abbott Elementary (R)	America's Funniest Home Videos (R)	
ABC	Late summer	The Conners (R)				The Rookie (R)	
CBS	Fall	Survivor 43 (22/6.71)		**The Real Love Boat**		The Amazing Race	
CBS	Late fall	Survivor 43 (22/6.71)		The Amazing Race		Various programming	
CBS	Winter	The Price Is Right at Night		Lingo		Tough as Nails	
CBS	Spring	Survivor 44 (22/6.71)		FBI (R)		**True Lies**	
CBS	Late spring	The Price Is Right at Night (R)		Various programming		CSI: Vegas (R)	
CBS	Summer	Big Brother		**Superfan**		**So Help Me Todd** (R)	
The CW	Fall	Stargirl		World's Funniest Animals (R)		Local programming	
The CW	Mid-fall	Stargirl		Kung Fu		Local programming	
The CW	Winter	Penn & Teller: Fool Us (R)		Kung Fu		Local programming	
The CW	Mid-winter	The Flash		Kung Fu		Local programming	
The CW	Spring	The Flash		Riverdale		Local programming	
The CW	Late spring	Nancy Drew		Riverdale		Local programming	
Fox	Fall	The Masked Singer		Lego Masters		Local programming	
Fox	Winter	Celebrity Name That Tune		**Special Forces: World's Toughest Test**		Local programming	
Fox	Late winter	The Masked Singer		**Special Forces: World's Toughest Test**		Local programming	
Fox	Spring	The Masked Singer		Farmer Wants a Wife		Local programming	
Fox	Late spring	MasterChef		**Gordon Ramsay's Food Stars**		Local programming	
Fox	Summer	MasterChef				Local programming	
NBC	Fall	Chicago Med (9/8.48)		Chicago Fire (5/9.25)		Chicago P.D. (11/8.27)	
NBC	Spring	**Night Court** (R)		Chicago Fire (5/9.25)		Chicago P.D. (11/8.27)	
NBC	Summer	**LA Fire & Rescue**		Chicago Fire (5/9.25)		Chicago P.D. (11/8.27)	
NBC	Late summer	America's Got Talent		**Night Court** (R)		Chicago P.D. (11/8.27)	

== Thursday ==
Network		8:00 p.m.	8:30 p.m.	9:00 p.m.	9:30 p.m.	10:00 p.m.	10:30 p.m.
ABC	Fall	Station 19		Grey's Anatomy		**Alaska Daily**	
ABC	Winter	**Celebrity Jeopardy!**		**The Parent Test**		The Chase	
ABC	Late winter	Station 19		Grey's Anatomy		**Alaska Daily**	
ABC	Summer	Generation Gap		The Chase		Press Your Luck (R)	
ABC	Mid-summer	Generation Gap		**The Prank Panel**		Shark Tank (R)	
CBS	Fall	Young Sheldon (4/9.28)	Ghosts (USA) (7/9.08)	**So Help Me Todd** (26/6.37)		CSI: Vegas	
CBS	Summer	Young Sheldon (4/9.28)	Ghosts (USA) (7/9.08)	Big Brother		The Challenge: USA	
The CW	Fall	Walker		**Walker: Independence**		Local programming	
The CW	Winter	Walker		Superman & Lois (R)		Local programming	
The CW	Spring	Walker		**100 Days to Indy**		Local programming	
The CW	Late spring	Walker		Penn & Teller: Fool Us (R)		Local programming	
The CW	Summer	**Fight to Survive**		FBOY Island (R)		Local programming	
Fox	Early fall	Fox Sports programming				Local programming	
Fox	Fall	Hell's Kitchen		Welcome to Flatch	Call Me Kat	Local programming	
Fox	Winter	Next Level Chef		**Animal Control**	Call Me Kat	Local programming	
Fox	Spring	**Alert: Missing Persons Unit** (R)		**Animal Control** (R)		Local programming	
Fox	Summer	**Alert: Missing Persons Unit** (R)		**Stars on Mars** (R)		Local programming	
Fox	Mid-summer	Fox Sports programming				Local programming	
NBC	Fall	Law & Order		Law & Order: Special Victims Unit (19/6.87)		Law & Order: Organized Crime	
NBC	Spring	The Blacklist		Law & Order: Special Victims Unit (19/6.87)		Magnum P.I. (R)	
NBC	Summer	Password (R)		Law & Order: Special Victims Unit (R)			
NBC	Mid-summer	Password (R)		Law & Order: Special Victims Unit (R)		Law & Order (R)	
NBC	Late summer	Password (R)		American Ninja Warrior (R)			

== Friday ==
Network		8:00 p.m.	8:30 p.m.	9:00 p.m.	9:30 p.m.	10:00 p.m.	10:30 p.m.
ABC	Fall	Shark Tank		20/20			
ABC	Spring	**Will Trent** (R)		20/20			
CBS	Fall	S.W.A.T. (23/6.68)		**Fire Country** (12/8.25)		Blue Bloods (6/9.24)	
CBS	Summer	Tough as Nails		**Fire Country** (12/8.25)		Blue Bloods (6/9.24)	
CBS	Mid-summer	Secret Celebrity Renovation		**Fire Country** (12/8.25)		Blue Bloods (6/9.24)	
The CW	Fall	Penn & Teller: Fool Us		Whose Line Is It Anyway?	Whose Line Is It Anyway? (R)	Local programming	
The CW	Winter	Penn & Teller: Fool Us		**Criss Angel's Magic With the Stars**		Local programming	
The CW	Mid-winter	Penn & Teller: Fool Us		Whose Line Is It Anyway?	Whose Line Is It Anyway? (R)	Local programming	
The CW	Spring	Penn & Teller: Fool Us		Whose Line Is It Anyway?	**The Great American Joke Off**	Local programming	
The CW	Summer	Family Law		**Moonshine**		Local programming	
Fox		WWE Friday Night SmackDown				Local programming	
NBC	Fall	Capital One College Bowl		Dateline NBC			
NBC	Mid-fall	**Lopez vs Lopez**	Young Rock	Dateline NBC			
NBC	Winter	**Lopez vs Lopez**	Grand Crew	Dateline NBC			
NBC	Spring	That's My Jam (R)		Dateline NBC			
NBC	Late spring	**Hot Wheels: Ultimate Challenge** (R)		Dateline NBC			
NBC	Summer	America's Got Talent (R)				Dateline NBC	

== Saturday ==
Network		8:00 p.m.	8:30 p.m.	9:00 p.m.	9:30 p.m.	10:00 p.m.	10:30 p.m.
ABC	Fall	ESPN Saturday Night Football on ABC (7:30 p.m.)					
ABC	Late fall	ESPN on ABC sports programming					
ABC	Winter	NBA Countdown	ESPN NBA Saturday Primetime on ABC				
ABC	Late winter	ABC Hockey Saturday					
ABC	Spring	ESPN on ABC sports programming					
ABC	Late spring	America's Funniest Home Videos (R)					
ABC	Summer	ESPN on ABC sports programming				**The Prank Panel** (R)	
ABC	Mid-summer	**Ms. Marvel** (R)					
CBS		Crimetime Saturday				48 Hours	
The CW	Fall	**Criss Angel's Magic with the Stars**		World's Funniest Animals	World's Funniest Animals (R)	Local programming	
The CW	Winter	Masters of Illusion	Masters of Illusion (R)	World's Funniest Animals	World's Funniest Animals (R)	Local programming	
The CW	Spring	Masters of Illusion	Masters of Illusion (R)	**Totally Weird and Funny**	**Totally Weird and Funny** (R)	Local programming	
The CW	Late spring	Masters of Illusion	Masters of Illusion (R)	**Totally Weird and Funny**		Local programming	
The CW	Summer	**Greatest Geek Year Ever: 1982**		Whose Line Is It Anyway? (R)		Local programming	
The CW	Mid-summer	Great Chocolate Showdown		**Recipe for Disaster**		Local programming	
Fox	Fall	Fox College Football (continued to game completion)					
Fox	Winter	Fox Primetime Hoops				Local programming	
Fox	Late winter	Fox Sports programming				Local programming	
Fox	Spring	USFL on Fox				Local programming	
Fox	Mid-spring	Baseball Night in America (7:00 p.m.)				Local programming	
NBC	Fall	Password (R)		Dateline Weekend Mystery		SNL Vintage	
NBC	Winter	The Wall (R)		Weakest Link (R)		SNL Vintage	
NBC	Spring	The Wall (R)		Weakest Link (R)		Password (R)	
NBC	Late spring	NBC Sports programming					
NBC	Summer	**Baking It** (R)		America's Got Talent (R)			

== By network ==
Note:

- Series that originally intended to air this season but are delayed to a later TV season due to the 2023 Writers Guild of America strike are indicated using †.
- Series that originally intended to air this season but are delayed to a later TV season due to the 2023 SAG-AFTRA strike are indicated using‡.

=== ABC ===
Returning series:

- The $100,000 Pyramid
- 20/20
- Abbott Elementary
- ABC Hockey Saturday
- America's Funniest Home Videos
- American Idol
- The Bachelor
- Bachelor in Paradise
- The Bachelorette
- Big Sky
- Celebrity Family Feud
- Celebrity Wheel of Fortune
- The Chase
- Claim to Fame
- The Conners
- Generation Gap
- The Goldbergs
- The Good Doctor
- The Great Christmas Light Fight
- Grey's Anatomy
- Home Economics
- Judge Steve Harvey
- A Million Little Things
- Monday Night Countdown
- Monday Night Football
- NBA Countdown
- NBA Saturday Primetime
- The Rookie
- Saturday Night Football
- Shark Tank
- Station 19
- The Wonder Years
- The Wonderful World of Disney

New series:

- **Alaska Daily**
- **Celebrity Jeopardy!** (Note: First version as a standalone series; previous broadcasts aired as special editions of the syndicated version of Jeopardy!.)
- **The Company You Keep**
- **The Game Show Show**
- **Jeopardy! Masters**
- **Ms. Marvel** (Note: U.S. broadcast television premiere; a Disney+ original miniseries.)
- **Not Dead Yet**
- **The Parent Test**
- **The Prank Panel**
- **The Rookie: Feds**
- **Will Trent**

Not returning from 2021–22:

- Black-ish
- Dancing with the Stars† (moved to Disney+; returned to ABC for 2023–24)
- The Fatal Flaw: A Special Edition of 20/20
- The Final Straw
- Holey Moley
- Let the World See
- Press Your Luck† (returning for 2023–24)
- Promised Land (burned off on Hulu)
- Queens
- Women of the Movement

=== CBS ===
Returning series:

- 48 Hours
- 60 Minutes
- The Amazing Race
- Big Brother
- Blue Bloods
- Bob Hearts Abishola
- CBS Sunday Night Movies
- The Challenge: USA
- CSI: Vegas
- The Equalizer
- FBI
- FBI: International
- FBI: Most Wanted
- Ghosts (USA)
- Lingo (Note: Series revival; previously aired on first-run syndication from 1987 to 1988 and Game Show Network from 2002 to 2007 and 2011.)
- NCIS
- NCIS: Hawaiʻi
- NCIS: Los Angeles
- The Neighborhood
- NFL on CBS
- Secret Celebrity Renovation
- Survivor
- S.W.A.T.
- Tough as Nails
- Young Sheldon

New series:

- **East New York**
- **Fire Country**
- **The Real Love Boat**
- **So Help Me Todd**
- **Superfan**
- **True Lies**

Not returning from 2021–22:

- Beyond the Edge
- B Positive
- Bull
- Good Sam
- How We Roll
- Magnum P.I. (moved to NBC)
- SEAL Team (moved to Paramount+; returning for 2023–24)‡
- Superstar Racing Experience (moved to ESPN)
- Undercover Boss (returning for 2026–27)
- United States of Al

=== The CW ===
Returning series:

- All American
- All American: Homecoming
- Bump
- The Chosen (reruns)
- Coroner
- The Flash
- Great Chocolate Showdown
- Kung Fu
- Masters of Illusion
- Mysteries Decoded
- Nancy Drew
- Penn & Teller: Fool Us
- Riverdale
- Stargirl
- Superman & Lois
- Walker
- Whose Line Is It Anyway?
- World's Funniest Animals

New series:

- **100 Days to Indy**
- **Barons**
- **Criss Angel's Magic with the Stars**
- **Down to Earth with Zac Efron** (Note: U.S. broadcast television premiere; a Netflix original series.)
- **Family Law**
- **Fantastic Friends**
- **Fight to Survive**
- **Gotham Knights**
- **The Great American Joke Off**
- **Greatest Geek Year Ever: 1982**
- **Moonshine**
- **Professionals**
- **Recipe for Disaster**
- **The Rising**
- **Run the Burbs**
- **Son of a Critch**
- **Totally Weird and Funny**
- **Walker: Independence**
- **The Winchesters**

Not returning from 2021–22:

- 4400
- Batwoman
- Charmed
- Dynasty
- In the Dark
- Legacies
- Legends of the Hidden Temple
- Legends of Tomorrow
- March
- Naomi
- Roswell, New Mexico
- Tom Swift
- Two Sentence Horror Stories
- Wellington Paranormal

=== Fox ===
Returning series:

- 9-1-1
- 9-1-1: Lone Star
- Baseball Night in America
- Beat Shazam
- Bob's Burgers
- Call Me Kat
- Celebrity Name That Tune
- The Cleaning Lady
- Crime Scene Kitchen
- Don't Forget the Lyrics!
- Family Guy
- Fantasy Island
- Farmer Wants a Wife (Note: Series revival; previously aired on The CW in 2008.)
- Fox College Football
- Fox College Hoops
- The Great North
- Hell's Kitchen
- HouseBroken
- Lego Masters
- The Masked Singer
- MasterChef
- Next Level Chef
- NFL on Fox
- The OT
- The Resident
- The Simpsons
- USFL on Fox
- Welcome to Flatch
- WWE SmackDown

New series:

- **Accused**
- **Alert: Missing Persons Unit**
- **Animal Control**
- **Gordon Ramsay's Food Stars**
- **Lego Masters: Celebrity Holiday Bricktacular**
- **Monarch**
- **Special Forces: World's Toughest Test**
- **Stars on Mars**

Not returning from 2021–22:

- The Big Leap
- Duncanville (burned off on Hulu)
- I Can See Your Voice† (returned for 2023–24)
- Joe Millionaire
- MasterChef Junior† (returned for 2023–24)
- Our Kind of People
- Pivoting
- So You Think You Can Dance† (returned for 2023–24)
- Thursday Night Football (moved to Prime Video)

=== NBC ===
Returning series:

- American Auto
- American Ninja Warrior
- America's Got Talent
- The Blacklist
- Capital One College Bowl
- Chicago Fire
- Chicago Med
- Chicago P.D.
- Dateline NBC
- Football Night in America
- Grand Crew
- La Brea
- Law & Order
- Law & Order: Organized Crime
- Law & Order: Special Victims Unit
- Magnum P.I. (moved from CBS)
- NBC Sunday Night Football
- New Amsterdam
- That's My Jam
- Transplant
- The Voice
- The Wall
- Weakest Link
- Young Rock

New series:

- **America's Got Talent: All-Stars**
- **Baking It**
- **Hot Wheels: Ultimate Challenge**
- **LA Fire & Rescue**
- **Lopez vs Lopez**
- **Night Court**
- **Quantum Leap**
- **The Wheel**

Not returning from 2021–22:

- America's Got Talent: Extreme
- The Courtship (burned off on USA Network)
- Dancing with Myself
- The Endgame
- Home Sweet Home (burned off on Peacock)
- Kenan
- Mr. Mayor
- Ordinary Joe
- Password† (returned for 2023–24)
- The Thing About Pam
- This Is Us

== Renewals and cancellations ==
=== Full season pickups ===
==== ABC ====
- Abbott Elementary—Picked up for a 22-episode full season on July 21, 2022.
- The Conners—Picked up for a 22-episode full season on October 12, 2022.
- The Rookie: Feds—Picked up for a 22-episode full season on October 21, 2022.

==== CBS ====
- East New York—Picked up for a full season on October 19, 2022.
- Fire Country—Picked up for a full season on October 19, 2022.
- So Help Me Todd—Picked up for a full season on October 19, 2022.

==== NBC ====
- Lopez vs Lopez—Picked up for a 22-episode full season on December 2, 2022.
- Quantum Leap—Picked up for six additional episodes on October 10, 2022, bringing the episode count to 18.

=== Renewals ===
==== ABC ====
- 20/20—Renewed for a forty-sixth season on May 16, 2023.
- Abbott Elementary—Renewed for a third season on January 11, 2023.
- ABC Hockey Saturday—Renewed for a tenth season on March 10, 2021; deal will last into a fourteenth season in 2027.
- American Idol—Renewed for a twenty-second season on May 16, 2023.
- America's Funniest Home Videos—Renewed for a thirty-fourth season on May 16, 2023.
- The Bachelor—Renewed for a twenty-eighth season on May 16, 2023.
- Bachelor in Paradise—Renewed for a ninth season on May 16, 2023.
- The Bachelorette—Renewed for a twenty-first season on February 10, 2024.
- Celebrity Family Feud—Renewed for an eleventh season on February 10, 2024.
- Celebrity Jeopardy—Renewed for a second season on May 16, 2023.
- Celebrity Wheel of Fortune—Renewed for a fourth season on May 16, 2023.
- Claim to Fame—Renewed for a third season on May 3, 2024.
- The Conners—Renewed for a sixth season on May 16, 2023.
- The Good Doctor—Renewed for a seventh and final season on April 19, 2023.
- The Great Christmas Light Fight—Renewed for an eleventh season on October 24, 2022.
- Grey's Anatomy—Renewed for a twentieth season on March 24, 2023.
- Jeopardy! Masters—Renewed for a second season on February 10, 2024.
- Monday Night Football—Renewed for a fourth season on March 18, 2021; deal will last into a thirteenth season in 2033.
- Not Dead Yet—Renewed for a second season on May 16, 2023.
- The Rookie—Renewed for a sixth season on April 17, 2023.
- Shark Tank—Renewed for a fifteenth season on May 16, 2023.
- Station 19—Renewed for a seventh and final season on April 20, 2023.
- Will Trent—Renewed for a second season on April 18, 2023.

==== CBS ====
- 48 Hours—Renewed for a thirty-fifth season on February 21, 2023.
- 60 Minutes—Renewed for a fifty-sixth season on February 21, 2023.
- The Amazing Race—Renewed for a thirty-fifth season on February 21, 2023.
- Blue Bloods—Renewed for a fourteenth and final season on March 29, 2023.
- Bob Hearts Abishola—Renewed for a fifth and final season on January 25, 2023.
- CSI: Vegas—Renewed for a third season on February 21, 2023.
- The Equalizer—Renewed for a fourth season on May 5, 2022.
- FBI—Renewed for a sixth season on May 9, 2022.
- FBI: International—Renewed for a third season on May 9, 2022.
- FBI: Most Wanted—Renewed for a fifth season on May 9, 2022.
- Fire Country—Renewed for a second season on January 6, 2023.
- Ghosts (USA)—Renewed for a third season on January 12, 2023.
- Lingo—Renewed for a second season on February 21, 2023.
- NCIS—Renewed for a twenty-first season on February 21, 2023.
- NCIS: Hawaiʻi—Renewed for a third season on February 21, 2023.
- The Neighborhood—Renewed for a sixth season on January 23, 2023.
- So Help Me Todd—Renewed for a second season on February 2, 2023.
- Survivor—Renewed for a forty-fifth season on February 21, 2023.
- S.W.A.T.—Renewed for a seventh and final season on May 8, 2023, reversing its cancellation after six seasons three days earlier.
- Young Sheldon—Renewed for a seventh and final season on March 30, 2021.

==== The CW ====
- 100 Days to Indy—Renewed for a second season on February 5, 2024.
- All American—Renewed for a sixth season on January 11, 2023.
- All American: Homecoming—Renewed for a third season on June 12, 2023.
- Masters of Illusion—Renewed for a tenth season on May 18, 2023.
- Penn & Teller: Fool Us—Renewed for a tenth season on May 18, 2023.
- Superman & Lois—Renewed for a fourth and final season on June 12, 2023.
- Walker—Renewed for a fourth season on May 9, 2023.
- Whose Line Is It Anyway?—Renewed for a twentieth and final season on November 5, 2022.
- World's Funniest Animals—Renewed for a fourth season on May 18, 2023.

==== Fox ====
- 9-1-1—Renewed for a seventh season on May 1, 2023 and would be moving to ABC.
- 9-1-1: Lone Star—Renewed for a fifth and final season on May 1, 2023.
- Accused—Renewed for a second season on March 23, 2023.
- Alert: Missing Persons Unit—Renewed for a second season on March 23, 2023.
- Animal Control—Renewed for a second season on May 10, 2023.
- Beat Shazam—Renewed for a seventh season on March 4, 2024.
- Bob's Burgers—Renewed for a fourteenth and fifteenth season on January 26, 2023.
- The Cleaning Lady—Renewed for a third season on February 1, 2023.
- Crime Scene Kitchen–Renewed for a third season on March 4, 2024.
- Don't Forget the Lyrics!—Renewed for a third season on March 4, 2024.
- Family Guy—Renewed for a twenty-second and twenty-third season on January 26, 2023.
- Farmer Wants a Wife—Renewed for a second season on May 15, 2023.
- Gordon Ramsay's Food Stars—Renewed for a second season on March 1, 2024.
- The Great North—Renewed for a fourth season on August 26, 2022.
- Lego Masters—Renewed for a fourth season on December 14, 2022.
- Lego Masters: Celebrity Holiday Bricktacular—Renewed for a second season on December 14, 2022.
- The Masked Singer—Renewed for a tenth season on May 15, 2023.
- MasterChef—Renewed for a fourteenth season on August 9, 2023.
- Next Level Chef—Renewed for a third and fourth season on May 11, 2023.
- The Simpsons—Renewed for a thirty-fifth and thirty-sixth season on January 26, 2023.
- Special Forces: World's Toughest Test—Renewed for a second season on May 15, 2023.

==== NBC ====
- American Ninja Warrior—Renewed for both fifteenth and sixteenth seasons on March 29, 2023.
- America's Got Talent—Renewed for a nineteenth season on September 27, 2023.
- Chicago Fire—Renewed for a twelfth season on April 10, 2023.
- Chicago Med—Renewed for a ninth season on April 10, 2023.
- Chicago P.D.—Renewed for an eleventh season on April 10, 2023.
- Football Night in America—Renewed for an eighteenth season on March 18, 2021; deal will go to a twenty-eighth season in 2033.
- La Brea—Renewed for a third and final season on January 31, 2023.
- Law & Order—Renewed for a twenty-third season on April 10, 2023.
- Law & Order: Organized Crime—Renewed for a fourth season on April 10, 2023.
- Law & Order: Special Victims Unit—Renewed for a twenty-fifth season on April 10, 2023.
- Lopez vs Lopez—Renewed for a second season on May 12, 2023.
- Magnum P.I.—The series' final season was split into two parts with the first ten episodes airing this season, and the remaining ten episodes of the final season airing in the 2023–24 season.
- NBC Sunday Night Football—Renewed for an eighteenth season on March 18, 2021; deal will go to a twenty-eighth season in 2033.
- Night Court—Renewed for a second season on February 2, 2023.
- Password—Renewed for a second season on May 12, 2023.
- Quantum Leap—Renewed for a second season on December 12, 2022.
- That's My Jam—Renewed for a third season on October 17, 2023.
- The Voice—Renewed for a twenty-fourth season on May 12, 2023, and then for a twenty-fifth season on June 20, 2023.

=== Cancellations/series endings ===
==== ABC ====
- Alaska Daily—Canceled on May 12, 2023.
- Big Sky—Canceled on May 12, 2023, after three seasons.
- The Company You Keep—Canceled on May 12, 2023.
- The Game Show Show—The miniseries was meant to run for one season only; it concluded on May 30, 2023.
- The Goldbergs—It was announced on February 23, 2023, that season ten would be the final season. The series concluded on May 3, 2023.
- Home Economics—Canceled on September 29, 2023, after three seasons.
- A Million Little Things—It was announced on November 7, 2022, that season five would be the final season. The series concluded on May 3, 2023.
- The Rookie: Feds—Canceled on November 9, 2023.
- The Wonder Years—Canceled on September 15, 2023, after two seasons.

==== CBS ====
- East New York—Canceled on May 8, 2023. The series concluded on May 14, 2023.
- NCIS: Los Angeles—It was announced on January 20, 2023, that season fourteen would be the final season. The series concluded on May 21, 2023.
- The Real Love Boat—It was announced on October 28, 2022, that the series would move to Paramount+ beginning November 2, 2022 after its first four episodes due to poor ratings, marking the first cancellation of the season.
- True Lies—Canceled on May 8, 2023. The series concluded on May 17, 2023.

==== The CW ====
- Barons—Pulled from the schedule on June 21, 2023, after four episodes, the remaining episodes will be available to stream on the CW app.
- Bump—Pulled from the schedule on August 30, 2023 after 5 episodes.
- Down to Earth with Zac Efron—Pulled from the schedule on July 27, 2023, after two episodes.
- Fantastic Friends—Pulled from the schedule on July 27, 2023, after two episodes.
- The Flash—It was announced on August 1, 2022, that season nine would be the final season. The series concluded on May 24, 2023.
- Gotham Knights—Canceled on June 12, 2023. The series concluded on June 27, 2023.
- Greatest Geek Year Ever: 1982—The miniseries was meant to run for one season only; it concluded on July 29, 2023.
- Kung Fu—Canceled on May 11, 2023, after three seasons.
- Nancy Drew—It was announced on October 26, 2022, that season four would be the final season. The series concluded on August 23, 2023.
- Professionals—Canceled on June 13, 2023.
- Recipe for Disaster—Pulled from the schedule on August 30, 2023 after 10 episodes.
- The Rising—Canceled by Sky on March 28, 2023.
- Riverdale—It was announced on May 19, 2022, that season seven would be the final season. The series concluded on August 23, 2023.
- Stargirl—It was announced on October 31, 2022, that season three would be the final season. The series concluded on December 7, 2022.
- Walker: Independence—Canceled on May 9, 2023.
- The Winchesters—Canceled on May 11, 2023.

==== Fox ====
- Call Me Kat—Canceled on May 5, 2023, after three seasons.
- Fantasy Island—Canceled on May 9, 2023, after two seasons.
- HouseBroken—Canceled on May 10, 2024, after two seasons.
- Monarch—Canceled on December 7, 2022.
- The Resident—Canceled on April 6, 2023, after six seasons.
- Welcome to Flatch—Canceled on October 6, 2023, after two seasons.

==== NBC ====
- American Auto—Canceled on June 16, 2023, after two seasons.
- The Blacklist—It was announced on February 1, 2023, that season ten would be the final season. The series concluded on July 13, 2023.
- Grand Crew—Canceled on June 9, 2023, after two seasons.
- Hot Wheels: Ultimate Challenge—Canceled on March 18, 2024.
- LA Fire & Rescue—Canceled on March 18, 2024.
- New Amsterdam—It was announced on March 14, 2022, that season five would be the final season. The series concluded on January 17, 2023.
- The Wheel—Canceled on June 22, 2023.
- Young Rock—Canceled on June 9, 2023, after three seasons.

== See also ==
- 2022–23 Canadian network television schedule
- 2022–23 United States network television schedule (morning)
- 2022–23 United States network television schedule (afternoon)
- 2022–23 United States network television schedule (late night)
- 2022–23 United States network television schedule (overnight)
- 2023 in South Korean television
