= List of 2023 American television debuts =

These American television shows premiered in 2023.

== Shows ==
First aired	Title	Channel	Source
January 1	Kaleidoscope	Netflix	
January 1	Paul T. Goldman	Peacock	
January 2	America's Got Talent: All-Stars	NBC	
January 3	Will Trent	ABC	
January 4	NFL Tailgate Takedown	Food Network	
January 4	Special Forces: World's Toughest Test	Fox	
January 8	Alert: Missing Persons Unit	Fox	
January 8	Mayfair Witches	AMC/AMC+	
January 9	Koala Man	Hulu	
January 11	SuperKitties	Disney Jr.	
January 12	The Climb	HBO Max	
January 12	Velma	HBO Max	
January 12	The Traitors	Peacock	
January 15	The Last of Us	HBO	
January 15	MILF Manor	TLC/Discovery+	
January 16	Down Home Fab	HGTV	
January 17	Night Court	NBC	
January 18	Power Slap: Road to the Title	TBS	
January 19	That '90s Show	Netflix	
January 20	Bling Empire: New York	Netflix	
January 20	Shape Island	Apple TV+	
January 20	The Real Friends of WeHo	MTV	
January 22	Accused	Fox	
January 26	Poker Face	Peacock	
January 26	Wolf Pack	Paramount+	
January 27	Shrinking	Apple TV+	
January 30	The Watchful Eye	Freeform	
January 30	Princess Power	Netflix	
February 1	The Ark	Syfy	
February 2	Freeridge	Netflix	
February 3	Dear Edward	Apple TV+	
February 3	Rubble and Crew	Nickelodeon	
February 4	Morning Joe: Weekend	MSNBC	
February 6	History's Greatest of All Time with Peyton Manning	History	
February 6	Work It Out Wombats!	PBS Kids	
February 7	MLW Underground Wrestling	Reelz	
February 8	Not Dead Yet	ABC	
February 9	My Dad the Bounty Hunter	Netflix	
February 10	Moon Girl and Devil Dinosaur	Disney Channel	
February 12	Kitchen Commando	Tubi	
February 14	Love Trip: Paris	Freeform	
February 14	Perfect Match	Netflix	
February 16	Animal Control	Fox	
February 17	Hello Tomorrow!	Apple TV+	
February 19	America in Black	BET/VH1	
February 19	The Company You Keep	ABC	
February 24	The Consultant	Amazon Prime Video	
February 24	The Reluctant Traveler	Apple TV+	
February 24	Liaison	Apple TV+	
February 28	FBI True	Paramount+	
March 1	True Lies	CBS	
March 4	Act Your Age	Bounce TV	
March 6	Bossy Bear	Nickelodeon	
March 9	School Spirits	Paramount+	
March 10	Unprisoned	Hulu	
March 10	Kiff	Disney Channel	
March 10	Outlast	Netflix	
March 14	Gotham Knights	The CW	
March 17	Agent Elvis	Netflix	
March 17	Extrapolations	Apple TV+	
March 17	Swarm	Amazon Prime Video	
March 19	Lucky Hank	AMC	
March 19	Inside with Jen Psaki	MSNBC/Peacock	
March 21	We Lost Our Human	Netflix	
March 22	Digman!	Comedy Central	
March 22	Kiya & the Kimoja Heroes	Disney Jr.	
March 23	The Night Agent	Netflix	
March 24	My Kind of Country	Apple TV+	
March 24	Up Here	Hulu	
March 24	Saturdays	Disney Channel	
March 26	Rabbit Hole	Paramount+	
March 26	Ride	Hallmark Channel	
March 29	AEW All Access	TBS	
March 29	The Big Door Prize	Apple TV+	
March 30	Unstable	Netflix	
March 31	The Great American Joke Off	The CW	
March 31	Eva the Owlet	Apple TV+	
March 31	The Power	Amazon Prime Video	
April 2	Royal Crackers	Adult Swim	
April 3	Race to Survive Alaska	USA Network	
April 4	The Crossover	Disney Channel	
April 6	Beef	Netflix	
April 6	Grease: Rise of the Pink Ladies	Paramount+	
April 6	Celebrity Prank Wars	E!	
April 7	Jury Duty	Amazon Freevee	
April 7	Tiny Beautiful Things	Hulu	
April 8	Totally Weird and Funny	The CW	
April 14	Jane	Apple TV+	
April 16	The Whole Story with Anderson Cooper	CNN	
April 20	Erin & Aaron	Nickelodeon	
April 20	The Diplomat	Netflix	
April 20	Mrs. Davis	Peacock	
April 20	Fired on Mars	HBO Max	
April 21	Slip	The Roku Channel	
April 23	Sami	Amazon Prime Video	
April 24	The Real Hatfields & McCoys: Forever Feuding	Fox Nation	
April 26	Saint X	Hulu	
April 27	100 Days to Indy	The CW	
April 27	The Gentle Art of Swedish Death Cleaning	Peacock	
April 28	Frog and Toad	Apple TV+	
April 28	Citadel	Amazon Prime Video	
April 30	Fatal Attraction	Paramount+	
May 3	Jewish Matchmaking	Netflix	
May 4	Bupkis	Peacock	
May 4	Star Wars: Young Jedi Adventures	Disney Jr./Disney+	
May 4	Unicorn: Warriors Eternal	Adult Swim	
May 5	Silo	Apple TV+	
May 7	Naked and Afraid: Last One Standing	Discovery Channel	
May 7	Summer House: Martha's Vineyard	Bravo	
May 8	Jeopardy! Masters	ABC	
May 9	Dancing Queens	Bravo	
May 10	The Muppets Mayhem	Disney+	
May 10	The Game Show Show	ABC	
May 12	City on Fire	Apple TV+	
May 12	Mulligan	Netflix	
May 17	High Desert	Apple TV+	
May 17	The Family Stallone	Paramount+	
May 18	I Survived Bear Grylls	TBS	
May 18	XO, Kitty	Netflix	
May 18	Rainn Wilson and the Geography of Bliss	Peacock	
May 19	Primo	Amazon Freevee	
May 23	Gremlins	Max	
May 24	American Born Chinese	Disney+	
May 24	Platonic	Apple TV+	
May 24	The Prank Panel	ABC	
May 25	FUBAR	Netflix	
May 30	Hot Wheels: Ultimate Challenge	NBC	
May 31	Drag Me to Dinner	Hulu	
June 4	The Idol	HBO	
June 5	Stars on Mars	Fox	
June 8	Hailey's On It!	Disney Channel	
June 8	Based on a True Story	Peacock	
June 9	Tribunal Justice	Amazon Freevee	
June 14	Pupstruction	Disney Junior	
June 14	The Big D	USA Network	
June 15	Pretty Freekin Scary	Disney Channel	
June 17	AEW Collision	TNT	
June 17	Extraordinary Birder with Christian Cooper	Nat Geo Wild	
June 18	The Walking Dead: Dead City	AMC	
June 19	Not Quite Narwhal	Netflix	
June 21	LA Fire & Rescue	NBC	
June 22	Skull Island	Netflix	
June 22	Glamorous	Netflix	
June 23	I'm a Virgo	Amazon Prime Video	
July 6	My Adventures with Superman	Adult Swim	
July 7	The Horror of Dolores Roach	Amazon Prime Video	
July 9	Never Say Never with Jeff Jenkins	National Geographic	
July 9	Luann & Sonja: Welcome to Crappie Lake	Bravo	
July 12	Quarterback	Netflix	
July 13	Survival of the Thickest	Netflix	
July 20	Supa Team 4	Netflix	
July 21	Praise Petey	Freeform	
July 24	Dew Drop Diaries	Netflix	
July 27	Twisted Metal	Peacock	
August 9	Superfan	CBS	
August 9	Strange Planet	Apple TV+	
August 10	Mech Cadets	Netflix	
August 15	The Love Experiment	MTV	
August 18	Harlan Coben's Shelter	Amazon Prime Video	
August 18	Time of Essence	Oprah Winfrey Network	
August 22	Ahsoka	Disney+	
August 31	One Piece	Netflix	
August 31	Adventure Time: Fionna and Cake	Max	
September 8	The Changeling	Apple TV+	
September 9	Tiny Toons Looniversity	Cartoon Network/Max	
September 10	The Walking Dead: Daryl Dixon	AMC	
September 11	Equal Justice with Judge Eboni K. Williams	First-run syndication	
September 11	Cutlers Court	First-run syndication	
September 11	Mathis Court with Judge Mathis	First-run syndication	
September 11	Justice for the People with Judge Milian	First-run syndication	
September 13	The Other Black Girl	Hulu	
September 13	Wrestlers	Netflix	
September 14	Buddy Games	CBS	
September 21	Young Love	Max	
September 24	Krapopolis	Fox	
September 24	Little Baby Bum: Music Time	Netflix	
September 25	The Irrational	NBC	
September 27	Snake Oil	Fox	
September 28	Castlevania: Nocturne	Netflix	
September 28	The Golden Bachelor	ABC	
September 29	Gen V	Amazon Prime Video	
September 29	Power Rangers Cosmic Fury	Netflix	
October 2	Lotería Loca	CBS	
October 2	Jessica's Big Little World	Cartoon Network	
October 3	Found	NBC	
October 11	Crimefeed	Investigation Discovery	
October 12	House of Villains	E!	
October 12	Frasier	Paramount+	
October 13	Raid the Cage	CBS	
October 13	Goosebumps	Disney+/Hulu	
October 18	Ms. Pat Settles It	BET	
October 19	Scavengers Reign	Max	
October 19	Captain Laserhawk: A Blood Dragon Remix	Netflix	
November 1	Black Cake	Hulu	
November 2	Unicorn Academy	Netflix	
November 3	Blue Eye Samurai	Netflix	
November 10	NCIS Sydney	CBS	
November 11	The Heroic Quest of the Valiant Prince Ivandoe	Cartoon Network	
November 12	Beacon 23	MGM+	
November 12	The Curse	Showtime	
November 17	Monarch: Legacy of Monsters	Apple TV+	
November 17	Twin Love	Amazon Prime Video	
November 17	Scott Pilgrim Takes Off	Netflix	
November 19	Cocomelon Lane	Netflix	
November 21	Nick Cannon Presents: Future Superstars	VH1	
November 29	King Charles	CNN	
November 30	Obliterated	Netflix	
November 30	Bookie	Max	
December 7	My Life with the Walter Boys	Netflix	
December 11	Big Brother Reindeer Games	CBS	
December 19	Percy Jackson and the Olympians	Disney+	
December 23	Extended Family	NBC	
December 31	Zokie of Planet Ruby	Prime Video	

== Television films and specials ==
These television films and specials premiered or are scheduled to premiere in 2023. The premiere dates may be changed depending on a variety of factors.

First aired	Title	Channel	Source
January 7	The Hammer	Lifetime	
January 26	Teen Wolf: The Movie	Paramount+	
January 31	Pamela, a Love Story	Netflix	
February 9	Harley Quinn: A Very Problematic Valentine's Day Special	HBO Max	
February 13	King Star King!/!/!/	Adult Swim	
February 19	Why Can’t My Life Be a Rom-Com?	E!	
February 20	Ballmastrz: Rubicon	Adult Swim	
February 21	Don't Leave Me Behind: Story of Young Ukrainian Survival	MTV	
February 26	Royal Rendezvous	E!	
March 5	Married by Mistake	E!	
March 27	The Young and the Restless 50th Anniversary Celebration	CBS	
March 30	Prom Pact	Disney Channel	
April 19	Mighty Morphin Power Rangers: Once & Always	Netflix	
April 26	Carol Burnett: 90 Years of Laughter + Love	NBC	
May 21	A Salute to NCIS: Los Angeles	CBS	
July 27	Zoey 102	Paramount+	
July 27	The Slumber Party	Disney Channel	
August 31	The Price Is Right: A Tribute to Bob Barker	CBS	
September 4	Office Race	Comedy Central	
September 28	A Really Haunted Loud House	Nickelodeon/Paramount+	
October 1	Mickey and Friends: Trick or Treats	Disney Channel/Disney Junior/Disney XD	
October 5	Monster High 2	Nickelodeon/Paramount+	
October 10	Lego Jurassic Park: The Unofficial Retelling	Peacock	
October 27	South Park: Joining the Panderverse	Paramount+	
October 29	Matthew Perry: Thanks for Being a Friend	Nick at Nite	
November 7	Dolly Parton – From Rhinestones to Rock & Roll	ABC	
November 22	Good Burger 2	Paramount+	
November 29	Christmas at Graceland	NBC	
November 30	The Bad Guys: A Very Bad Holiday	Netflix	
November 30	Selena + Chef: Home for the Holidays	Food Network	
December 2	Ladies Of The ’80s: A Divas Christmas	Lifetime	
December 8	Diary of a Wimpy Kid Christmas: Cabin Fever	Disney+	
December 8	Mr. Monk's Last Case: A Monk Movie	Peacock	
December 10	A Grammy Salute to 50 Years of Hip Hop	CBS	
December 11	Barry Manilow's A Very Barry Christmas	NBC	
December 17	Archer: Into the Cold	FX/FXX	
December 17	Willie Nelson's 90th Birthday Celebration	CBS	
December 20	South Park: Not Suitable for Children	Paramount+	
December 21	Dick Van Dyke: 98 Years of Magic	CBS	
December 21	The Christmas Break	Fox	

== Miniseries ==
This listing consists of shows classified as miniseries, limited series, or limited docuseries premiering in 2023. The premiere dates may change depending on a variety of factors.

First aired	Title	Channel	Source
January 16	The Price of Glee	Discovery+	
January 26	The 1619 Project	Hulu	
February 5	Murf the Surf	MGM+	
March 3	Daisy Jones & the Six	Amazon Prime Video	
March 5	SWV & Xscape: The Queens of R&B	Bravo	
March 6	History of the World, Part II	Hulu	
March 12	A Spy Among Friends	MGM+	
March 26	Great Expectations	Hulu	
April 7	Transatlantic	Netflix	
April 12	Rennervations	Disney+	
April 13	Florida Man	Netflix	
April 14	The Last Thing He Told Me	Apple TV+	
April 16	Waco: The Aftermath	Showtime	
April 21	Dead Ringers	Amazon Prime Video	
April 27	Love & Death	HBO Max	
May 1	A Small Light	National Geographic	
May 1	White House Plumbers	HBO	
May 4	Queen Charlotte: A Bridgerton Story	Netflix	
May 7	The 2010s	CNN	
May 10	Class of '09	Hulu	
May 10	The Game Show Show	ABC	
May 21	Ghosts of Beirut	Showtime	
June 9	The Crowded Room	Apple TV+	
June 14	The Full Monty	Hulu	
June 21	Secret Invasion	Disney+	
July 8	Greatest Geek Year Ever: 1982	The CW	
July 13	Full Circle	Max	
July 18	Justified: City Primeval	FX	
August 10	Painkiller	Netflix	
August 22	Ahsoka	Disney+	
September 22	The Continental: From the World of John Wick	Peacock	
September 22	Deadlocked: How America Shaped the Supreme Court	Showtime	
October 11	4 Ever	Disney+	
October 12	The Fall of the House of Usher	Netflix	
October 13	Lessons in Chemistry	Apple TV+	
October 29	Fellow Travelers	Showtime	
November 2	All the Light We Cannot See	Netflix	
November 5	Lawmen: Bass Reeves	Paramount+	
November 14	A Murder at the End of the World	FX on Hulu	
December 14	The Real Housewives Ultimate Girls Trip: RHONY Legacy	Peacock	
December 15	Carol & The End of The World	Netflix	
