= CW Sports =

Sports division of American broadcast network The CW

- Launched: February 25, 2023; 3 years ago
- Division of: The CW
- Country of origin: United States
- Key people: Michael Perman (SVP, CW Sports)
- Headquarters: Burbank, California
- Major broadcasting contracts: NCAA football; NCAA basketball; NASCAR; WWE NXT
- Official website: www.cwtv.com/sports/

CW Sports is the sports programming division of The CW that is responsible for sports broadcasts carried on the network.

The division was formed on February 25, 2023 with The CW's acquisition of broadcast rights to LIV Golf. The CW also airs college football and basketball games from the Atlantic Coast Conference, college football games from the Pac-12 Conference and the NASCAR O'Reilly Auto Parts Series.

Unlike the sports divisions of the other major networks, CW Sports does not currently produce any of its own programming; its current properties are produced via partnerships with third-party producers (including in-house media departments such as NASCAR Productions and Pac-12 Enterprises, and outside production companies such as Raycom Sports).

== History ==
=== Launch ===
Logo until January 2024

In August 2022, Nexstar Media Group acquired a majority stake in The CW network. Nexstar focused on broadening the network's programming, including adding sports.

In January 2023, The CW agreed to a three-year broadcast deal with LIV Golf, the upstart professional golf tour financed by Saudi Arabia's Public Investment Fund, marking the first-ever national sports broadcasting contract for the network. Weekday rounds will be available on The CW's streaming apps, while weekend rounds will air on the broadcast network. The announcement led to the launch of the CW Sports division. The network and main owner Nexstar were criticized by the National Press Club for participating in what it considers an attempt by the Saudi government to rehabilitate its image following the assassination of journalist Jamal Khashoggi.

On February 14, 2023, the network said its LIV Golf coverage would be carried in 100% of U.S. media markets. However, as existing contracts at the time only obligated CW affiliates to air prime time and Saturday morning E/I programming, some of them declined to carry LIV coverage. Among the refraining stations were the eight CW stations owned by CBS News and Stations, ostensibly due to CBS Sports' longstanding partnership with the competing PGA Tour. In many of the affected markets, LIV coverage would air on a Nexstar-owned station, a subchannel carrying a digital multicast network, or on another station not connected with The CW or Nexstar under a secondary affiliation agreement. The CW declined to renew their rights to LIV Golf beyond the 2024 season, with Fox Sports becoming the new home for the golf tour. On February 17, 2023, The CW announced it had picked up the rights to 100 Days to Indy, a documentary series following the leadup to the 2023 Indianapolis 500 produced by Penske Entertainment and Vice Media. The show moved to the steaming service Fox Nation in 2025, in conjunction with Fox's rights to the IndyCar Series.

=== Expansion ===
Throughout 2023, The CW announced the acquisition of several sports properties. On June 7, The CW announced it acquired the rights to Inside the NFL, which was previously cable-exclusive to HBO and then Showtime, and streamed on Paramount+, for its 47th season, bringing the series to broadcast television for the first time. NFL Films continues to produce, with former Steelers safety Ryan Clark as the new host, and Channing Crowder, Jay Cutler, Chad Johnson and Chris Long as analysts. The show was dropped by The CW following Super Bowl LIX in February 2025.

On July 13, 2023, The CW acquired rights to a package of Atlantic Coast Conference football and basketball from Raycom Sports through the 2026–27 season, including 13 football games per-season, 28 men's basketball games, and 9 women's basketball games per-season.. The package had previously been held by Bally Sports, but was dropped by the network amid its bankruptcy.

On July 28, 2023, NASCAR announced that The CW Sports had acquired rights to the NASCAR Xfinity Series from 2025 to 2031, replacing NBC Sports; the broadcasts would be produced in-house by NASCAR Productions. On April 11, 2024, It was announced that the final eight races of the 2024 NASCAR Xfinity Series—including the regular season finale at the Food City 300, and the playoffs—would air on The CW as part of a sublicensing agreement; NBC Sports would produce the broadcasts.

In January 2024, the division's name was amended to simply "CW Sports" as part of The CW's new brand identity. The rebranding had notably removed the article "The" from the network's logo and certain use cases (while maintaining "The CW" as its verbal branding); chief marketing officer Chris Spadaccini specifically cited the sports division as a context where "CW" worked better than "The CW".

On May 14, CW Sports announced an agreement to carry 11 football games involving Oregon State University and Washington State University, the two remaining members of the Pac-12 Conference. After simulcasting the 2023 edition as part of an agreement with the game's then-sponsor Barstool Sports, CW Sports also acquired rights to the 2024 Arizona Bowl. On July 22, CW Sports announced that it would rebrand its football coverage as CW Football Saturday for the upcoming season, adding an eponymous studio show hosted by Mike Yam. The program, as well as the OSU/WSU games, are produced by Pac-12 Enterprises, which consists of the remaining staff of the Pac-12 Conference's former cable channel Pac-12 Network. In September, The CW aired the finals of the Chicago Open beach volleyball tournament as part of a one-off deal with the Association of Volleyball Professionals. In December, The CW added two new ACC women's basketball games to its 2025 sports schedule, creating a pair of Sunday doubleheaders.

In the first quarter of 2025, CW Sports announced media rights agreements with Grand Slam Track the Association of Volleyball Professionals, PBA Tour bowling, the HBCU All-Star Basketball game, as well as a renewal of its agreement to air Pac-12 football games for the 2025 season. In June, The CW announced an agreement with the Savannah Bananas to air one Banana Ball game in July. In July, The CW announced a multi-year deal with Professional Bull Riders to air weekend events. Grand Slam Track would only organize three aired meets before cancelling its planned fourth event in Los Angeles, and filed for bankruptcy protection in December, with intentions to return if viable.

In August 2025, with it expanding to nine members beginning in 2026, the Pac-12 conference announced a renewal of its broadcasting agreement with CW Sports through the 2030–31 academic year. The contract covers 66 events per-season, including 13 football games, regular season men's (35) and women's (15) basketball games, as well as coverage of the semi-finals and championship of its women's basketball tournament.

In January 2026, CW Sports announced it had acquired broadcast rights to the MGM Slam Tennis tournament. In February, CW Sports announced a media rights deal to air college football and basketball games from the Mountain West Conference. In March, CW Sports announced an agreement to broadcast six Savannah Bananas games. On April 29, The CW announced an agreement with ESPN, under which it would sublicense the digital rights to CW Sports live events and WWE programming (including WWE NXT and the NXT brand's live events) to ESPN Unlimited beginning on August 4. In May, CW Sports renewed its agreement with the ACC and Raycom Sports through the 2030 season, expanding to 14 football games, 30 men’s basketball games, and 10 women’s basketball games per-season. In August, CW Sports announced a multi-year agreement to air the Holiday Bowl and the Poinsettia Bowl. In September, CW Sports announced a multi-year agreement to broadcast NHRA Drag Racing beginning in 2027. In November, CW Sports announced a multi-year extension to continue airing the PBR Team Series through 2029.

== Programs ==
=== Current live events ===
- College football
  - Atlantic Coast Conference (2023–present)
    - 14 games per-season
  - Pac-12 Conference (2024–present)
    - 13 games per-season
  - Mountain West Conference (2026–present)
    - 13 regular-season games
  - Bowl Games
    - Arizona Bowl (2023–present)
- College basketball
  - Atlantic Coast Conference (2023–present)
    - 30 men's basketball games per-season
    - 10 women's basketball games per-season
  - Pac-12 Conference (2026–present)
    - 35 men's basketball games
    - 15 women's basketball games per-season
    - Semifinal and championship of the Pac-12 Conference women's basketball tournament
- AVP Volleyball (2024–present)
- Banana Ball (2025–present)
- NASCAR O'Reilly Auto Parts Series (2024–present)
- PBA Bowling (2026–present)
- PBR Bull Riding (2025–present)
- WWE NXT (2024–present)

=== Upcoming events ===
- College basketball
  - Mountain West Conference (2026)
    - 20 men's basketball games
    - 15 women's basketball games per-season
- College football
  - Bowl Games
    - Holiday Bowl (2026)
    - Poinsettia Bowl (2026)
- NHRA Drag Racing (2027)

=== Studio programming ===
- CW College Football Countdown (2025–present)
- NASCAR Countdown Live (2024–present)

=== Past programming ===
- LIV Golf (2023–24)
- 100 Days to Indy (2023–24)
- Grand Slam Track (2025)
- HBCU All-Star Basketball Game (2025)
- Inside the NFL (2023–25)
- MGM Slam Tennis Tournament (2026)

== Sports on local CW affiliates ==
Outside of network programming, several CW affiliates have carried telecasts of basketball, football and in some cases, other collegiate sporting events (such as baseball or hockey) that are produced by syndicators, while a few carry games from local teams of major professional sports leagues such as Major League Baseball (the New York Mets on WPIX) and the NBA (the Los Angeles Clippers on KTLA).

=== Affiliate preemptions ===
Seventeen affiliates of The CW, eight of which were owned by CBS News and Stations, declined to carry the network's sports coverage of LIV Golf, which as weekend afternoon programming was not specified, nor mandated, under the network's affiliation contracts as of LIV Golf's debut on The CW. In all of the affected markets, the network has made secondary affiliation arrangements with other stations. Seven additional stations agreed to carry LIV Golf and subsequently affiliated with the CW on September 1, 2023: Nexstar-owned WPHL-TV, KRON-TV and WTTA; Hearst-owned KQCA; Gray Television-owned WPCH-TV; and Sinclair-owned WPNT and KUNS-TV.

Several affiliates have also preempted coverage of the O'Reilly Series in favor of local sports.
