= 2023 in television =

2023 in television may refer to

- 2023 in American television for television-related events in the United States.
  - List of 2023 American television debuts for television debut related events in the United States.
- 2023 in Australian television for television-related events in Australia.
- 2023 in British television for television-related events in the United Kingdom.
  - 2023 in Scottish television for television-related events in Scotland.
- 2023 in Canadian television for television-related events in Canada.
- 2023 in Dutch television for television-related events in Netherlands.
- 2023 in Irish television for television-related events in the Republic of Ireland.
- 2023 in Japanese television for television-related events in Japan.
- 2023 in Philippine television for television-related events in the Philippines.
- 2023 in South Korean television for television-related events in South Korea.
- 2023 in Spanish television for television-related events in Spain.
- 2023 in Tamil television for television-related events in the Tamil language.
