= Game show (disambiguation) =

A game show is a type of show in which contestants play a game, usually for money or prizes.

Game Show or Gameshow may also refer to:

- Gameshow (album), a 2016 album by Two Door Cinema Club
- "Game Show" (Clarence), a 2016 television episode
- "Game Show" (Dexter's Laboratory), a 1997 television episode
- "Game Show" (Filthy Rich & Catflap), a 1987 television episode

== See also ==
- Quiz show (disambiguation)
- Game Show Network, an American television channel
- The Game Show Show, a television documentary miniseries
