= Quiz show (disambiguation) =

A quiz show is a type of game show. It may also refer to:

- Quiz Show (film), a 1994 film based on the 1950s quiz show scandals
- Quiz Show (video game), a 1976 arcade game
- "The Quiz Show", an episode of I Love Lucy

== See also ==
- Game show (disambiguation)
- 1950s quiz show scandals, impropriety in American game shows
