= IndyCar Series on Fox =

- Genre: Auto racing telecasts
- Directed by: Mitch Riggin
- Presented by: Will Buxton; James Hinchcliffe; Townsend Bell
- Opening theme: "Kickstart My Heart" by Mötley Crüe
- Country of origin: United States
- Original languages: English; Spanish (Fox Deportes)

Production
- Producer: Pam Miller
- Camera setup: Multi-camera
- Production companies: Penske Entertainment; Fox Sports

Original release
- Network: Fox (1999, 2002, 2025–present); Fox Deportes (2025–present); Fox Sports Net (1999); FS1 (2025–present); FS2 (2025–present); Speed (2002–03, 2005–06)
- Release: February 28, 2025

Related
- IndyCar Series on ABC; IndyCar Series on NBC; NASCAR on NBC; NASCAR on Fox

The IndyCar Series on Fox is a presentation of IndyCar Series racing produced by Fox Sports. The package premiered in 2025 as part of a multi-year agreement between Fox and IndyCar, which includes all races airing on the Fox broadcast network, and supplemental coverage (including qualifying sessions and Indy NXT races) airing on sister cable networks Fox Sports 1 (FS1) and Fox Sports 2 (FS2).

== History ==
=== Indy Racing League and CART/CCWS ===
The Fox family of networks had a brief foray into Indy car racing starting in 1999. Fox Sports Net covered six IRL races in 1999, including Dover which aired on Fox. In 2002, Fox carried the CART race at Long Beach, along with 11 other races on sister network Speed (now Fox Sports 1). Speed also covered Champ Car World Series events in 2003, 2005, and 2006.

=== IndyCar Series ===
On June 13, 2024, IndyCar announced that Fox Sports had acquired the rights to the IndyCar Series under a multi-year deal beginning in 2025, replacing NBC Sports. Fox Sports stated that it would carry all 17 events, plus the Indianapolis 500 qualifying sessions, on the Fox broadcast network, while Fox Sports 1 and Fox Sports 2 would carry shoulder programming such as qualifying and Indy NXT series races. Fox News streaming service Fox Nation also became the new home for IndyCar's docuseries 100 Days to Indy (moving from The CW), with its 2025 season expanding to cover the entire season rather than primarily focusing on the Indianapolis 500.

In January 2025, Fox began an advertising campaign for its inaugural season, including promos highlighting IndyCar drivers such as Josef Newgarden, Álex Palou, and Pato O'Ward; several of these promos premiered during Fox's NFL playoff coverage, and three IndyCar promos aired throughout Fox's broadcast of Super Bowl LIX.

On July 31, 2025, Fox Corporation announced that it would acquire a one third stake in IndyCar parent company Penske Entertainment. As part of the sale, Fox Sports' contract with IndyCar was given a renewal to 2030.

== Production ==
As was the case under NBC Sports, on-site production for all race telecasts is provided by Penske Entertainment's in-house broadcasting arm IMS Productions, with Fox Sports contributing on-air talent and other production elements and technology. Fox Sports SVP of technical operations Mike Davies stated that despite its prior motorsports experience from broadcasts such as NASCAR on Fox, IndyCar was "totally different", and presented "some real opportunities and some real challenges".

Features from Fox's NASCAR coverage would be adapted, including the use of drone cameras, and new SMT tracking and analytics systems to allow for features such as on-screen "pointer" graphics to identify vehicles, the augmented reality "GhostCar" used during qualifying sessions to visualize lap time comparisons, and an augmented reality telemetry graphic shown on in-car cameras. Fox stated that it would produce the Indianapolis 500 as a "marquee" event with a similar scale to other flagship Fox Sports telecasts such as the Daytona 500; the event replaces the Coca-Cola 600 as Fox's marquee motorsports event of Memorial Day weekend, as the rights to that race moved to Amazon Prime Video in 2025 as part of its new rights to NASCAR.

Fox's overall on-air presentation was influenced by a visit to Team Penske's garage in North Carolina by Fox Sports art director Andrew Narayan, as well as his sighting of a decommissioned car with exposed carbon fiber—the latter of which would contribute to a "raw" aesthetic inspired by the technology of IndyCar racing. Fox would adopt "Kickstart My Heart" by Mötley Crüe as its theme music for IndyCar Series broadcasts; while originally intended by Narayan as a placeholder (considering it symbolic of his childhood nostalgia as a "car guy"), it was received positively by Fox executives and was ultimately kept as the final theme.

Fox's coverage of the 2025 Indianapolis 500 faced criticism from viewers for multiple aspects of its production, including a large number of commercial breaks (which, in some cases, caused the coverage to miss notable moments of the race), and cutting away from Álex Palou crossing the finish line to cover Nolan Siegel's final lap crash (which had no bearing on the outcome).

== Broadcast teams ==
On January 14, 2025, Fox announced Will Buxton as its lap-by-lap commentator, joined by Townsend Bell and James Hinchcliffe as analysts; both Bell and Hinchcliffe are carried over from NBC.

On February 26, 2025, Fox finalized their pit reporter lineup for the 2025 season, which will consist of NBC alumni Kevin Lee, Georgia Henneberry, and Jack Harvey, with Jamie Little as the reserve, joining for selected races.

=== English-language commentators ===
==== Lap-by-lap anchor ====
- Will Buxton

==== Color commentators ====
- James Hinchcliffe
- Townsend Bell
- Clint Bowyer (Washington)
- Joey Logano

==== Pit reporters ====
- Kevin Lee
- Jack Harvey
- Georgia Henneberry
- Jamie Little

==== Pre-race host ====
- Chris Myers

==== Pre-race analysts/presenters ====
- Danica Patrick
- Tony Stewart
- Helio Castroneves
- Tom Rinaldi

=== Spanish-language commentators ===
==== Lap-by-lap anchor ====
- Tony Rivera

==== Color commentators ====
- Jessi Losada
- Oriol Servià

==== Pit reporters ====
- Giselle Zarur
