= Recipe for Disaster (TV series) =

American reality television series

- Genre: Food reality television
- Directed by: Devin Armstrong
- Presented by: Ann Pornel; Eden Grinshpan; Shahir Massoud
- Country of origin: United States
- Original language: English
- No. of seasons: 1
- No. of episodes: 13

Production
- Executive producers: Andrika Lawren; Jennifer Twamley; Cyle Zezo
- Production company: 3Bird Media

Original release
- Network: The CW (episodes 1–10); The CW App (episodes 11–13)
- Release: August 5 – September 3, 2023

Recipe for Disaster is an American cooking competition television series that premiered on August 5, 2023 on The CW and completed its first season on September 3, 2023.

Three of the episodes streamed exclusively on The CW App. No decision has been made on a second season.

== Format ==
In each episode of Recipe for Disaster, three new chefs and their cooking buddies, who are complete novices in the kitchen, must create spectacular dishes to impress the judges, all while they are dodging a variety of over-the-top disasters which are themed to the episode's subject matter and serve to create mess, distract and throw off the teams' cooking processes.

At the start of the episode, the participants are presented with a Judge's Choice challenge in which they each must make a dish that aligns with clear parameters set by the judges. While they are cooking, they are assaulted by messy and distracting disasters that fit with that episode's theme. The judges taste the dishes and designate one team as the winner, which is given a benefit ahead of the next round.

The winner of the Judge's Choice challenge gets to assign the episode's disaster ingredient to another team of their choosing in order to handicap that team in the next challenge. The disaster ingredient is pre-determined and is also related to the theme of the episode.

The second and final challenge in each episode is the Chef's Choice. The participants can cook anything they want, although there are still some parameters assigned that all must adhere to (for instance, in one episode the dish must be "floating." In another it must be "stacked"). The team that received the disaster ingredient must also seamlessly and impressively incorporate it into their dish. The chefs are once again put through a series of themed disasters while they are cooking.

Once the time is up, the judges taste and name one team the Masters of Disaster. The winning team walks away with a certificate and a token prize themed to the episode.

== Sustainability themes ==
The series incorporated a number of themes on-screen related to sustainability, with at least one plant-based cooking challenge, reference to sustainable ingredients, comedic climate-related jokes, visuals of a compost chute, forgoing gas-powered stoves, and casting multiple vegan and plant-forward chef contestants.

== Episodes ==
No.	Title	Original release date	Prod. code	U.S. viewers (millions)	Rating (18-49)
1	"End of the Rainbow"	August 5, 2023	111	0.190	0.02/0
2	"Dracula's Dinner Party"	August 5, 2023	109	0.108	0.02/0
3	"Way-Too-Fun Fair"	August 12, 2023	113	0.203	0.04/1
4	"Parisian Tourist Trap"	August 12, 2023	101	0.201	0.04/0
5	"Dining with Dinos"	August 19, 2023	104	0.174	0.04/1
6	"Bank Robber's Banquet"	August 19, 2023	110	0.130	0.03/0
7	"Sinking Cruise Ship"	August 26, 2023	107	0.256	0.05/1
8	"Martian Mayhem!"	August 26, 2023	103	0.180	0.04/1
9	"Daycare Nightmare"	September 2, 2023	102	0.222	0.03/0
10	"Bad Dog Park"	September 2, 2023	112	0.201	0.04/0
11	"Prom Gone Wrong"	September 3, 2023	105	N/A	N/A
12	"Not-So-Simple Life"	September 3, 2023	108	N/A	N/A
13	"Snow Globe City"	September 3, 2023	106	N/A	N/A
