= 2023 in South Korean television =

This is a non-comprehensive list of Television in South Korea related events from 2023.

== Legend ==
- Light blue indicates local programming.
- Gray indicates encore programming.
- Blue-gray indicates news programming.
- Light green indicates sporting events.
- Red indicates series being burned off and other irregularly scheduled programs, including specials and movies.
- Light gold indicates programming produced outside of the South Korea.
- Light yellow indicates the current schedule.
- highlight Yellow highlights indicates the top-10 most watched programs of the season.
- highlight Cyan highlights indicates numbers 11-20 most watched programs of the season.
- highlight Magenta highlights indicates numbers 21-30 most watched programs of the season.
- highlight Highlights indicates that it falls in multiple of the above categories.

== Schedule ==
- New series to broadcast television are highlighted in **bold**.
- Repeat airings or same-day rebroadcasts are indicated by **(R)**.
- All times are Korea Standard Time.

=== Sunday ===
Network		4:00 p.m.	5:00 p.m.	6:00 p.m.	7:00 p.m.	8:00 p.m.	9:00 p.m.	10:00 p.m.	11:00 p.m.
SBS	July	Inkigayo	**Revenant** (R)	Running Man		SBS 8 NEWS	My Little Old Boy		**National Office of Investigation-Director's CUT** (R)
SBS	Last Summer	Inkigayo	Same Bed, Different Dreams 2: You Are My Destiny (R)	Running Man		SBS 8 NEWS	My Little Old Boy		**Moo-Jang Show** (R)
KBS 2TV	July	**The Real Has Come!** (3:20 p.m., R)	Boss in the Mirror	2 Days & 1 Night		**The Real Has Come!**	Road to Mad		**9th Current**
Channel A	Summer	Watch Dr. Oh's Golden Clinic (R)		Channel A NEWS TOP 10 (5:40 p.m.)	News A	Men's life groom class these days (R)		My Golden Kids (R)	Now On My Way to Meet You
KBS 1TV	Summer	Animal Bestfriend (R)	KBS NEWS; Animal Kingdom	Open Concert	KBS NEWS Issue Ssam	KBS UHD Luxury	KBS News 9	The Day	Docu Insight (R)
MBC	Summer	Hangout with Yoo (R)	Adventure by Accident 2 (R)	King of Mask Singer		MBC NEWS DESK; Straight	Adventure by Accident 2		**Unexpected**
MBC	Last Summer	Various programming (R)		King of Mask Singer		MBC NEWS DESK; Straight	Various programming (R)		
TV CHOSUN	Pre-Summer	Various programming	**Durian's Affair**(R)		TV CHOSUN News 7	Star Documentary My Way	**Durian's Affair**		**Show Queen**
TV CHOSUN	Summer	Various programming	**Durian's Affair**(R)		TV CHOSUN News 7	Star Documentary My Way	**Durian's Affair**		Show Queen(R)
TV CHOSUN	Last Summer	Various programming		**Angry battle: The singing king of this area**	TV CHOSUN News 7	Star Documentary My Way	**Masterpiece studio: Order it right away**		Show Queen(R)
TV CHOSUN	October	Various programming		**Angry battle: The singing king of this area**	TV CHOSUN News 7	Star Documentary My Way	**My Happy End**		Various programming
tvN	Pre-Summer	Various programming		**290milions**(R)		**290milions**	**See You in My 19th Life**		Various programming
tvN	Summer	Various programming		**290milions**(R)		**290milions**	**The Uncanny Counter 2: Counter Punch**		O'PENing

=== Monday ===
Network		7:50 p.m.	8:30 p.m.	9:10 p.m.	9:50 p.m.	10:30 p.m.	11:10 p.m.	11:50 p.m.	12:30 a.m.	1:10 a.m.
SBS	Summer	SBS 8 NEWS		lifemaster		Same Bed, Different Dreams 2: You Are My Destiny		SBS Nightline	Sports Tonight	
KBS 2TV	July	**Woman in a Veil**	Doggy		**Heartbeat**		**The Live**	I Love Sports	**Studio K**	
KBS 2TV	September	**Graceful Empire**	Doggy		**My Lovely Boxer**		**The Live**	I Love Sports	**Studio K**	
Channel A	July	News A (7 p.m.)	the days of the Pure Land	My Golden Kids (R)			No, Thank You 2		Watch Dr. Oh's Golden Clinic (R)	
Channel A	September	News A (7 p.m.)	**4 People on the Table**	My Golden Kids (R)		Men's life groom class these days (R)			Watch Dr. Oh's Golden Clinic (R)	
KBS 1TV	Pre-Summer	Korean language BATTLE	**Apple of My Eye**	KBS News 9	Golden Oldies		**KBS Newsline W**	**9th Current** (R)	Various programming	
KBS 1TV	Summer	Various programming	**Apple of My Eye**	KBS News 9	Golden Oldies		**KBS Newsline W**	Various programming		
MBC	Summer	MBC NEWS DESK (7:40 p.m.)		If we don't fight			Marriage Hell		Sports Magazine	Various programming
TV CHOSUN	Pre-Summer	The story of reincarnation		TV CHOSUN News 9	**RAMYUN Bros.**			Special Edition of Guest Heo Young-man's Trip to Baekban	Medical documentary Medicine (R)	
TV CHOSUN	Summer	The story of reincarnation		TV CHOSUN News 9	**Show Queen**				Medical documentary Medicine (R)	
TV CHOSUN	Last Summer	The story of reincarnation		TV CHOSUN News 9	**Trot Trip**				Survival king (R)	
tvN	Pre-Summer	**290milions**(R)		**Delightfully Deceitful**		**Busan Boys**			Various programming	
tvN	Summer	You Quiz on the Block(R)		**My Lovely Liar**		**Bros on Foot**			Various programming	

=== Tuesday ===
Network		7:50 p.m.	8:30 p.m.	9:00 p.m.	9:30 p.m.	10:00 p.m.	10:30 p.m.	11:00 p.m.	12:00 a.m.
SBS	Summer	SBS 8 NEWS		Dolsing Fourmen		Strong Heart League			SBS Nightline
SBS	Last Summer	SBS 8 NEWS		Dolsing Fourmen		**Moo-Jang Show**			SBS Nightline
KBS 2TV	July	**Woman in a Veil**	The Return of Superman		**Heartbeat**			**The Live**	2nd House 2 (R)
KBS 2TV	September	**Graceful Empire**	The Return of Superman		**My Lovely Boxer**			**The Live**	(R)
Channel A	July	News A (7 p.m.)	Mommy Ko Doo Shim	**Welcome Back, Map of the move**			My Golden Kids (R)		Watch Dr. Oh's Golden Clinic (R)
Channel A	September	News A (7 p.m.)	Watch Dr. Oh's Golden Clinic (September-)		My special day (R)		Steel Troops 3		
KBS 1TV	Summer	My Neighbor, Charles	**Apple of My Eye**	KBS News 9		Current Chang(The Window)	**KBS Newsline W**	Issue Ssam (R)	Love for disabled family (R)
ENA	Summer	**Lies Hidden in My Garden** (7:15 p.m., R)	**Real 'Law'mans, a man and woman in a lawsuit**			**Lies Hidden in My Garden**		Various programming	
ENA	Summer	**Not Others** (7:15 p.m., R)	**Real 'Law'mans, a man and woman in a lawsuit**			**Not Others**		Various programming	
TV CHOSUN	Summer	Crisis Escape Survival King		TV CHOSUN News 9		I Love Tuesday Night			
tvN	Pre-Summer	Free 19 (7:30 p.m.)		**Delightfully Deceitful**		Naked World History 3			**A poor golfer** (with tvN STORY)
tvN	Summer	Free 19 (7:30 p.m.)		**My Lovely Liar**		Naked World History 3			**A poor golfer** (with tvN STORY)

=== Wednesday ===
Network		7:50 p.m.	8:30 p.m.	9:10 p.m.	9:50 p.m.	10:30 p.m.	11:10 p.m.	11:50 p.m.	12:30 a.m.	1:10 a.m.
SBS	Summer	SBS 8 NEWS		Kick A Goal		**National Office of Investigation-Director's CUT**		SBS Nightline	Donation World Special	Open TV viewers' world (R)
KBS 2TV	July	**Woman in a Veil**	Problem Child in House		**Smokinggun**		**The Live**	I Love Sports	The Return of Superman (R)	
Channel A	Pre-Summer	News A (7 p.m.)	a 100-year-old project (R)	Men's life groom class these days		My Golden Kids (R)		**Heart Signal 4** (R)		
Channel A	July	News A (7 p.m.)	a 100-year-old project (R)	Men's life groom class these days		**A Man Who Feeds The Dog: House for Pet**		**Heart Signal 4** (R)		
KBS 1TV	Summer	Workman	**Apple of My Eye**	KBS News 9	The secret of life and death		**KBS Newsline W**	Current Chang(The Window) (R)		Network Special
MBC	Summer	MBC NEWS DESK (7:40 p.m.)		Adventure by Accident 2 (R)		Radio Star		Various programming (R)		(Sign-Off)
TV CHOSUN	Summer	Perfect Life		TV CHOSUN News 9	Trot & Brothers				Health Duty-Free (R)	
tvN	Summer	Story Adult (with tvN STORY	You Quiz on the Block			Comedy Big League			Various programming (R)	

=== Thursday ===
Network		7:50 p.m.	8:30 p.m.	9:00 p.m.	9:30 p.m.	10:00 p.m.	10:30 p.m.	11:00 p.m.	12:00 a.m.
SBS	Pre-Summer	SBS 8 NEWS		Staff Only			The Tail		SBS Nightline
SBS	Summer	SBS 8 NEWS		**The Killing Vote**			The Tail		SBS Nightline
KBS 2TV	July	**Woman in a Veil**	Coin Battle: Hong Kim Dong Jeon		2nd House 2			**The Live**	**Smokinggun** (R)
Channel A	June	News A (7 p.m.)	The Body God 2		**Meet that Meat**		The Fishermen and the City Special		Watch Dr. Oh's Golden Clinic (R)
Channel A	July	News A (7 p.m.)	The Body God 2		**Hard Life Rich People 2: Escape from Closed** (R)		The Fishermen and the City Special		Watch Dr. Oh's Golden Clinic (R)
KBS 1TV	Summer	Korean Cuisine and Dining	**Apple of My Eye**	KBS News 9		Docu Insight		**KBS Newsline W**	KBS Classic Symphony
ENA	Summer	**Battle for Happiness** (R)		**Battle for Happiness**			**I'm Solo, After Four Seasons**		**Battle for Happiness** (R)
ENA	Summer	**Longing for You** (R)		**Longing for You**			**I'm Solo, After Four Seasons**		**Longing for You** (R)
TV CHOSUN	Summer	Exclusive News Seven		TV CHOSUN News 9		**Mr. Lotto**			
tvN	Pre-Summer	Naked Korean History 3 (7:10 p.m., form tvN STORY)	Europe Outside Your Tent				**Dancing Queens on the Road**		**The dessert** (with TVING)
tvN	Summer	Naked Korean History 3 (7:20 p.m., form tvN STORY)		**Dancing Queens on the Road**			**Around The Earth**		Various programming (R)

=== Friday ===
Network		7:50 p.m.	8:30 p.m.	9:10 p.m.	9:50 p.m.	10:30 p.m.	11:10 p.m.	11:50 p.m.	12:30 a.m.	1:10 a.m.
SBS	July	SBS 8 NEWS		Reasons Why	**Revenant**		**I Said Stayhome**		**National Office of Investigation-Director's CUT** (R)	
SBS	August	SBS 8 NEWS		Reasons Why	**The First Responders 2**		**I Said Stayhome**		**National Office of Investigation-Director's CUT** (R)	
SBS	September	SBS 8 NEWS		Reasons Why	**7 Escape**		Various programming (R)			
KBS 2TV	July	**Woman in a Veil**	Stars' Top Recipe at Fun-Staurant		**The Seasons- a night garden**			**Heartbeat** (R)		
Channel A	July	My Golden Kids		Watch Dr. Oh's Golden Clinic			**Heart Signal 4**			Various programming
Channel A	September	My Golden Kids		**Golden Kids Become a Chef**			**After Signal House**			Various programming
KBS 1TV	Summer	Park Wonsook's Let's Live Together (R, Local programming)	**Apple of My Eye**	KBS News 9	In-Depth 60 Minutes		**KBS Newsline W**	Indiefilm		Various programming
ENA	Summer	Various programming (R)								
ENA	August	Various programming (R)				**Future From Above**		Various programming (R)		
TV CHOSUN	July	Guest Heo Young-man's Trip to Baekban		TV CHOSUN News 9	**Trot Trip**			Various programming (R)	**Medical Documentary The+Medical**	
TV CHOSUN	August	Guest Heo Young-man's Trip to Baekban		TV CHOSUN News 9	**Chosun's sports club**			Various programming (R)	**Medical Documentary The+Medical**	
tvN	July	Hongduku (7:10 p.m.)	Tvneartharcade 2			Various programming (R)				
tvN	August	Hongduku (7:10 p.m.)	**Maya according to his brother: Nine Keys**				Various programming (R)			

=== Saturday ===
Network		7:00 p.m.	8:00 p.m.	9:00 p.m.	9:30 p.m.	10:00 p.m.	10:30 p.m.	11:00 p.m.	11:30 a.m.
SBS	Summer	What's on Earth!	SBS 8 NEWS	**Revenant** (R)		**Revenant**			Unanswered Questions
KBS 2TV	July	Immortal Songs: Singing the Legend (18:10)	**The Real Has Come!**		Mr. House Husband 2		Battle Trip 2		
Channel A	Summer	News A	**Hard Life Rich People 2: Escape from Closed**		Various programming (R)				Now On My Way to Meet You (R)
KBS 1TV	Summer	KBS NEWS Town 2	Animal Bestfriend	KBS News 9	The world is now		Docu On	Scout 4.0 Early Advice (R)	
MBC	Summer	Hangout with Yoo	MBC NEWS DESK Lottery	**Numbers** (R)		**Numbers**		Omniscient Interfering View	
TV CHOSUN	July	TV CHOSUN News 7	**Mr. Lotto** (R)	**Durian's Affair**			Eenemies Talk		
TV CHOSUN	Last Summer	TV CHOSUN News 7	**Mr. Lotto** (R)	Eenemies Talk			**Love Who? 2**		
tvN	July	DoReMi Market		**See You in My 19th Life**			Various programming (R)		
tvN	August	DoReMi Market		**The Uncanny Counter 2: Counter Punch**			Various programming (R)		

== Ongoing ==
=== Animation ===
Show	Network	First Aired	Source
The Haunted House	Tooniverse	July 20, 2016	

== New Series & Returning Shows ==
=== Drama ===
Title	Channel/Platform	First Aired	Last Aired	Status	Ref.
Brain Works	KBS2	January 2	February 28	Ended	
Payback	SBS TV	January 6	February 11	Ended	
Agency	JTBC	January 7	February 26	Ended	
Crash Course in Romance	tvN	January 14	March 5	Ended	
Strangers Again	ENA	January 18	February 22	Ended	
Kokdu: Season of Deity	MBC TV	January 27	March 24	Ended	
Our Blooming Youth	tvN	February 6	April 11	Ended	
Love to Hate You	Netflix	February 10	February 10	Ended	
The Heavenly Idol	tvN	February 15	March 23	Ended	
Pandora: Beneath the Paradise	tvN	March 11	April 30	Ended	
Woman in a Veil	KBS2	March 14	August 4	Ended	
Joseon Attorney	MBC TV	March 31	May 20	Ended	
The Secret Romantic Guesthouse	SBS TV	March 20	May 16	Ended	
Duty After School	TVING	March 31	April 21	Ended	
True to Love	ENA	April 12	May 25	Ended	
Stealer: The Treasure Keeper	tvN	April 12	May 18	Ended	
Queenmaker	Netflix	April 14	April 14	Ended	
Doctor Cha	JTBC	April 15	June 4	Ended	
Family: The Unbreakable Bond	tvN	April 17	May 23	Ended	
Meant to Be	MBC TV	April 17	October 20	Ended	
Queen of Masks	Channel A	April 24	June 13	Ended	
The Good Bad Mother	JTBC	April 26	June 8	Ended	
Dr. Romantic 3	SBS TV	April 28	June 17	Ended	
My Perfect Stranger	KBS2	May 1	June 20	Ended	
All That We Loved	TVING	May 5	May 26	Ended	
Tale of the Nine Tailed 1938	tvN	May 6	June 11	Ended	
Race	Disney+	May 10	June 14	Ended	
Black Knight	Netflix	May 12	May 12	Ended	
Delightfully Deceitful	tvN	May 29	July 18	Ended	
Battle for Happiness	ENA	May 31	July 20	Ended	
See You in My 19th Life	tvN	June 17	July 23	Ended	
King the Land	JTBC	June 17	August 6	Ended	
Lies Hidden in My Garden	ENA	June 19	July 11	Ended	
Revenant	SBS TV	June 23	July 29	Ended	
Durian's Affair	TV CHOSUN	June 24	August 13	Ended	
Celebrity	Netflix	June 30	June 30	Ended	
Not Others	ENA	July 17	August 22	Ended	
Longing for You	ENA	July 26	September 7	Ended	
My Lovely Liar	tvN	July 31	September 29	Ended	
The First Responders 2	SBS TV	August 4	September 9	Ended	
The Elegant Empire	KBS2	August 7	January 19, 2024	Ended	
Moving	Disney+	August 9	September 20	Ended	
The Killing Vote	SBS TV	August 10	November 16	Ended	
Cold Blooded Intern	TVING	August 11	September 15	Ended	
Mask Girl	Netflix	August 18	August 18	Ended	
A Time Called You	Netflix	September 8	September 8	Ended	
Han River Police	Disney+	September 13	September 27	Ended	
The kidnapping day	ENA	September 13	October 25	Ended	
The Escape of the Seven	SBS TV	September 15	May 18, 2024	Ended	
Live Your Own Life	KBS2	September 16	March 17, 2024	Ended	
Twinkling Watermelon	tvN	September 25	November 14	Ended	
The Worst of Evil	Disney+	September 27	October 25	Ended	
Strong Girl Nam-soon	JTBC	October 7	November 26	Ended	
Doona!	Netflix	October 20	October 20	Ended	
The Third Marriage	MBC TV	October 23	May 23, 2024	Ended	
Perfect Marriage Revenge	MBN	October 28	December 3	Ended	
The Matchmakers	KBS2	October 30	December 25	Ended	
Moon in the Day	ENA	November 1	December 14	Ended	
Daily Dose of Sunshine	Netflix	November 3		Ended	
Vigilante	Disney+	November 8	November 29	Ended	
Korea–Khitan War	KBS2	November 11	March 10, 2024	Ended	
A Bloody Lucky Day	TVING	October 4	December 8	Ended	
The Story of Park's Marriage Contract	MBC TV	November 24	January 6, 2024	Ended	
My Demon	SBS TV	November 24	January 20, 2024	Ended	
My Happy Ending	TV CHOSUN	December 30	February 25, 2024	Ended	
Gyeongseong Creature	Netflix	December 22	September 27, 2024	Ended	
Welcome to Samdal-ri	JTBC	December 2	January 21, 2024	Ended	

=== Animation ===
Title	Channel/Platform	First Aired	Last Aired	Status	Ref.
The Haunted House: Ghost Ball ZERO	Tooniverse	March 30	June 15	Ended	

== Ending ==
End date	Title	Channel/Platform	First Aired	Ref.
January 8	Alchemy of Souls	tvN	June 18	
January 12	Unlock My Boss	ENA	December 7	
January 21	The Forbidden Marriage	MBC TV	December 9	
January 31	Missing: The Other Side	OCN/tvN	August 29	

== Scheduled award ceremonies ==
2023 drama award ceremonies
Date	Event	Host	Location(s)	Ref.
October 8	2023 Asia Contents Awards & Global OTT Awards	Kim Kang-woo; Nancy	BIFF Theater, Busan Cinema Center, Busan	
October 14	14th Korea Drama Awards	Gong Seo-young; Park Chan-min	Gyeongnam Culture and Arts Center, Grand Performance Hall, Jinju, South Gyeongsang Province	
December 23	2023 KBS Entertainment Awards	Shin Dong-yup; Joo Woo-jae; Cho Yi-hyun	KBS New Wing Open Hall, Yeouido-dong, Yeongdeungpo-gu, Seoul	
December 29	2023 SBS Drama Awards	Shin Dong-yup	SBS Prism Tower in Sangam-dong, Mapo-gu, Seoul	
December 30	2023 SBS Entertainment Awards	Lee Sang-min; Lee Hyun-i; Kim Ji-eun	SBS Prism Tower in Sangam-dong, Mapo-gu, Seoul	
December 30	2023 MBC Drama Awards	Kim Sung-joo; Park Gyu-young	MBC Media Center Public Hall, Sangam-dong, Mapo-gu, Seoul	
December 31	2023 KBS Drama Awards	Jang Sung-kyu, Rowoon; Seol In-ah	KBS Hall, Yeouido, Seoul	

== See also ==
- 2022–23 Canadian network television schedule
- 2022–23 United States network television schedule
