= 100 Days to Indy =

2023 sport television documentary series

- Genre: Docuseries
- Directed by: Patrick Dimon
- Country of origin: United States
- Original language: English
- No. of seasons: 3
- No. of episodes: 15

Production
- Executive producers: Patrick Dimon; Bryan Terry; Adam Marinelli; Falguni Lakhani Adams
- Production companies: Penske Entertainment; Vice World News (S1); Bright North Studio USA (S2)

Original release
- Network: The CW (2023–2024); Fox Nation (2025)
- Release: April 27, 2023 – June 5, 2025

100 Days to Indy is an American sport television docuseries about the IndyCar Series and the Indianapolis 500 automobile race. It premiered on April 27, 2023, on The CW. 100 Days to Indy aired on The CW for two seasons, covering the 2023 and 2024 running of the Indy 500 respectively.

With IndyCar Series rights transferring to Fox Sports beginning with the 2025 season, 100 Days to Indy moved to the streaming platform Fox Nation; the third season is billed as 100 Days to Indy: Road to the IndyCar Championship, with its focus expanding to encompass both the 500 and the IndyCar season at large.

== Production ==
100 Days to Indy is co-produced by Penske Entertainment and Vice World News. The series is directed by Patrick Dimon, who also serves as a co-executive producer. Adam Marinelli serves as a co-executive producer and showrunner, while Falguni Lakhani Adams and Bryan Terry serve as executive producers.

The CW greenlit the show on December 6, 2022 as part of its demographic shift after its acquisition by Nexstar Media Group. On February 17, 2023, it revealed that it would premiere on the network on April 27, 2023. On February 5, 2024, the docuseries was renewed for a second season which premiered on April 26, 2024.

The first season showcased behind-the-scenes look at IndyCar Series drivers preparing for the Indianapolis 500 race and starred Josef Newgarden. The second season features Newgarden alongside Marcus Ericsson, Pato O'Ward, Álex Palou and Kyle Larson.

On February 24, 2025, 100 Days to Indy was moved to Fox-owned streaming platform Fox Nation for its third season. The series, now titled 100 Days to Indy: Road to the IndyCar Championship, expanded its focus to the entire IndyCar season; whilst remaining at six episodes like the prior seasons, the upcoming 2025 season will be split into two parts, each at 3 episodes. The first part will focus on the start of the IndyCar season and the Indy 500 itself, whilst the second part will focus on the battle for the championship. This came after Fox Sports acquired the rights to broadcast the IndyCar Series, including the Indy 500, from NBC at the conclusion of the 2024 season.

== Episodes ==
=== Series overview ===
Season	Episodes	Originally released	
Season	Episodes	First released	Last released
1	6	April 27, 2023	June 8, 2023
2	6	April 26, 2024	June 7, 2024
3	3	May 22, 2025	June 5, 2025

=== Season 1 (2023) ===
No. overall	No. in season	Title	Directed by	Original release date	Prod. code	U.S. viewers (millions)
1	1	"Crowded at the Top"	Patrick Dimon	April 27, 2023	101	0.19
2	2	"Knocking at the Door"	Patrick Dimon	May 4, 2023	102	0.21
3	3	"California Dreamin"	Patrick Dimon	May 11, 2023	103	0.21
4	4	"Stay on Track"	Patrick Dimon	May 18, 2023	104	0.14
5	5	"The Road to the 500"	Patrick Dimon	May 25, 2023	105	0.22
6	6	"Finally"	Patrick Dimon	June 8, 2023	106	0.19

=== Season 2 (2024) ===
No. overall	No. in season	Title	Directed by	Original release date	Prod. code	U.S. viewers (millions)
7	1	"Show Me the Money"	Patrick Dimon	April 26, 2024	201	0.18
8	2	"More Money More Problems"	Patrick Dimon	May 3, 2024	202	0.18
9	3	"The Double Edged Sword"	Patrick Dimon	May 10, 2024	203	0.14
10	4	"Crossing the Line"	Patrick Dimon	May 17, 2024	204	0.19
11	5	"Fast or Last"	Patrick Dimon	May 24, 2024	205	0.19
12	6	"Nothing Owed"	Patrick Dimon	June 7, 2024	206	0.18

== Ratings ==
=== Season 1 ===
Viewership and ratings per episode of 100 Days to Indy
No.	Title	Air date	Rating (18–49)	Viewers (millions)
1	"Crowded at the Top"	April 27, 2023	0.0	0.19
2	"Knocking at the Door"	May 4, 2023	0.1	0.21
3	"California Dreamin"	May 11, 2023	0.0	0.21
4	"Stay on Track"	May 18, 2023	0.0	0.14
5	"The Road to the 500"	May 25, 2023	0.1	0.22
6	"Finally"	June 8, 2023	0.0	0.19

=== Season 2 ===
Viewership and ratings per episode of 100 Days to Indy
No.	Title	Air date	Rating (18–49)	Viewers (millions)
1	"Show Me the Money"	April 26, 2024	0.03	0.18
2	"More Money More Problems"	May 3, 2024	0.02	0.18
3	"The Double Edged Sword"	May 10, 2024	0.01	0.14
4	"Crossing the Line"	May 17, 2024	0.02	0.19
5	"Fast or Last"	May 24, 2024	0.02	0.19
6	"Nothing Owed"	June 7, 2024	0.03	0.18
