= Fox Nation =

American subscription streaming conservative news service

- Website type: Entertainment, streaming
- Available in: English
- Headquarters: New York City, New York, {{{location_country}}}
- Owner: Fox Corporation
- Parent: Fox News Media
- Website: nation.foxnews.com
- Registration: Optional
- Launched: November 27, 2018; 7 years ago
- Current status: Active

Fox Nation is an American subscription video on demand service. Announced on February 20, 2018, and launching on November 27 of that year, it is a companion to Fox News Channel carrying programming of interest to its audience, including original opinion-based talk shows and documentary-style programs featuring Fox News personalities (which, as with its parent network, are produced from a conservative perspective), outdoor recreation-related programs, and other acquired programming. It also offers next-day streaming of Fox News primetime programs.

The "Fox Nation" name originates from a website Fox News had launched in 2009, which featured blogs by conservative and liberal commentators. The new service was announced for a debut in late 2018, and was described as catering to "superfans" of the conservative-leaning Fox News—which the network deemed to be "the most loyal audience in cable, if not all of television".

== Programming ==
Some of the original programming on the service has included Nuff Said with Tyrus, What Made America Great with Brian Kilmeade, and Sincerely, Kat, hosted by The Greg Gutfeld Show panelist Kat Timpf. Diamond and Silk had a program on Fox Nation, but was canceled by Fox News in March 2020, amid their promotion of COVID-19 misinformation.

In 2020, the service began to acquire outdoor recreation-themed programming, including acquiring streaming rights to the A&E reality show Duck Dynasty, and premiering the original hunting series Fox Nation Outdoors.

On March 29, 2021, the service began to carry Tucker Carlson Today, a spin-off of Tucker Carlson Tonight. Tucker Carlson also produced original documentaries for the service under the banner Tucker Carlson Originals.

In May 2021, Fox Nation began to stream Fox News primetime programs (such as Tucker Carlson Tonight and Hannity) on-demand the day after their original airing, branded as "Fox News Primetime All the Time". It also added a video simulcast of Dan Bongino's syndicated radio show, as part of an agreement for him to host a new Saturday night program on Fox News. In September 2021, Fox Nation announced a revival of former Fox series Cops for a 33rd season, after having previously been canceled by Paramount Network following the police murder of George Floyd.

In March 2022, Fox Nation announced Duck Family Treasure, a new reality series starring Jase and Jep Robertson of Duck Dynasty fame. In April 2022, Fox Nation announced Historic Battles for America, a historical miniseries narrated by Kelsey Grammer. It also acquired Piers Morgan Uncensored from the British channel TalkTV, which is a sister to Fox News via sister company News Corp and News UK. In September 2022 Fox Nation premiered its first direct-to-streaming film, The Shell Collector, adapted from the novel by Nancy Naigle.

In February 2023, it acquired the Dan Aykroyd-fronted comedy documentary A History of the World in Six Glasses. The service has begun to acquire stand-up comedy specials involving conservative-leaning comedians, such as Roseanne Barr (Roseanne Barr: Cancel This!) and Rob Schneider (Woke Up in America).

In June 2023, Fox Nation acquired Crime Cam 24/7, a caught-on-camera series hosted by Sean "Sticks" Larkin of Live PD fame. In July 2023, Fox Nation announced The Fall of the House of Mardaugh, a Martha MacCallum-hosted docuseries on the Alex Mardaugh murders that would also include an interview with his son Buster Mardaugh. In September 2023, it released The Killer Interview with Piers Morgan, a documentary series in which Morgan interviews convicted killers.

The following month, Fox Nation announced Jesus Crown of Thorns, a docu-drama from Jane Root's Nutopia. During the Easter season in 2024, it also exhibited the drama The Chosen and film The Passion of the Christ.

The Saints, a docudrama series narrated and presented by Martin Scorsese, debuted on Fox Nation in November 2024.

In 2025, Fox Nation began adding sports programming for the first time. In February, it was announced that in conjunction with Fox Sports' rights to the IndyCar series, that the third season of its docuseries 100 Days to Indy would move from The CW to Fox Nation. The show additionally expanded its focus to the entire IndyCar Series season and gained the subtitle Road to the IndyCar Championship. In July, Fox Nation announced its first live sports agreements with the Professional Bull Riders team series and with Real American Freestyle wrestling.

== See also ==
- The Daily Wire
