= Hot Wheels: Ultimate Challenge =

- Inspired by: Hot Wheels by Mattel
- Presented by: Rutledge Wood
- Judges: Dalal Elsheikh; Hertrech Eugene Jr.
- Country of origin: United States
- Original language: English
- No. of seasons: 1
- No. of episodes: 10

Production
- Executive producers: Tim Warren; Andy Thomas; Sharon Levy; DJ Nurre; Michael Heyerman; Rick Murray; Chris Hale; Fred Soulie; Phil Breman
- Production companies: Mattel Television; Workerbee TV; Endemol Shine North America

Original release
- Network: NBC
- Release: May 30 – August 8, 2023

Hot Wheels: Ultimate Challenge is an American automotive renovation competition show that premiered on NBC on May 30, 2023. The show locates cars that hold meaning to the contestants from their past before they are remodeled into Hot Wheels-style vehicles. On March 18, 2024, it was revealed that the show was cancelled after one season.

== Show format ==
In Hot Wheels: Ultimate Challenge, two contestants are brought in to tell a story about a vehicle from their past that holds meaning to them. This car is then brought out to them for them to remodel with the help of The Car Pool, a team of technicians and car experts. Each team works in an on-set garage visible to the other, and they have one week to complete the modifications. At some point in the week, the Inspirationator 5000 produces a die-cast Hot Wheels car, and the teams have to find a way to incorporate part of that Hot Wheel into the design of their own vehicle. The winner of each episode wins $25,000 and gets an opportunity to compete in the grand finale for another $50,000, and the winning vehicle will be turned into an actual die-cast Hot Wheels toy.

=== Judges and hosts ===
Rutledge Wood hosts the show and judges the cars alongside Ford designer Dalal Elsheikh and Hertrech "Hert" Eugene Jr. from Hoonigan. Each week, a different celebrity guest joins them to judge the creations.

== Episodes ==
| No. | Title | Original release date | Prod. code | U.S. viewers (millions) |
|---|---|---|---|---|
| 1 | "Cyber Slicker vs. Power Charged" | May 30, 2023 | 101 | 2.31 |
Hot Wheels super fans Jadejha Edwards (Houston, Texas) and "Jerzey" Jim Farrell (New Jersey) are the first to face-off in transforming their ordinary vehicles from their childhoods into an extraordinary Hot Wheels. Actor/host Terry Crews serves as a guest judge. The 'Twist': the "Bad to the Blade" Hot Wheels, a futuristic Indy-Car that's a fighter jet fused with a dragon. Both teams must include one element from its design.: Jadejha's vehicle: a 2009 Chevrolet Camaro which is turned into the "Cyber Slicker", a cyber security, Tron vibe theme, inspired by Hot Wheels: "Gruppo x24" (a green futuristic vehicle) and a 1968 Chevy Camaro: one of the original “Sweet Sixteen” Hot Wheels cars. It has huge rims and massive wheels, neon green paint with computer code decals on a wide body kit, a spoiler, and under mounted lights.; Jerzey Jim's vehicle: a matte black 1969 Dodge Charger he and his father built as 'Old Yellow' but now called "Power Charged" inspired by Hot Wheels, "Super Bird" (bright yellow paint), "Poppa Wheelie" (introduced in 2014, a three-wheeled van with a V8 engine and wheelie bar on the back), and "Shift Kicker" (created by designer Larry Wood in 2004). The finished product is bright yellow with blue flames, a massive HEMI motor in the trunk to pop a wheelie, along with a wheelie bar.; Winner: Jerzey Jim's "Power Charged" AKA People's Choice
| 2 | "Monster Bug vs. Buckaroo" | June 6, 2023 | 102 | 2.04 |
Superfans Sheilah Spencir (Cedar Hills, TX) and Kevin Lister (Houston, TX) are the next to face-off in this Texas battle. Actor Anthony Anderson and his mother, Doris come along for the ride as the special guest judges. The 'Twist' in the builders designs is the "Twin Mill" (twin engines on each side) one of the first-editions of the most famous and sought-after Hot Wheels of all-time. Teams must modify the car designs to include a moving element: Texas-shaped spinning wheels and moving horned toad spikes.: Kevin's vehicle: a 1977 Ford Thunderbird inspired by his home state lowrider's S.L.A.B. (Slow, low, loud & banging) design, Hot Wheels: "Limozeen" (based on a Cadillac limousine, originally released in 1991), blue paint from a Chevy Camero, and the "Mig Rig" (a pick-up truck with the top chopped off). The finished product is the "Buckaroo" to represent all Texas cowboys: candy blue paint with horses on the side, cowhide seats, and hydraulics to make it buck like a bronco.; Shieilah's vehicle: a 1970 Volkswagen Bug inspired by Hot Wheels: "Baja Bug" (built for off-road races in the Baja 500, Mexico), "Vampyra" (based on a vampire bat, first released in 1986), and the Texas horned lizard. Called the "Monster Bug", this matte green VW Bug with spikes on top and a giant lizard face for the grill with red headlights and a massive engine in the front is almost too scary to drive.; Winner: Sheilah's "Monster Bug"
| 3 | "Spirit of Detroit vs. Flamin' Fire Truck" | June 13, 2023 | 103 | 1.70 |
The next two Hot Wheels Superfans, Aldavid Jimerson (Phoenix, Arizona/originally from Detroit, Michigan) and Rob Anders, a third-generation firefighter (Gibert, Arizona) will build their own personal childhood rides into the ultimate Hot Wheels showstoppers. The 'Twist' in the design is the iconic "Bone Shaker", over 100 models of this design were created. It features a chop top, exposed engine and a decorative skull grill. The Car Pool builders need to incorporate one design element from this car into their builds.: Aldavid's vehicle: a 1990 Chevrolet K5 Blazer inspired by Hot Wheels: "Formula Solar", an aerodynamic solar-powered speeder that completely runs on green energy. Called, "Spirit of Detroit", it features an exoskeleton framework, two heavy metal vertical exhaust pipes 'stackers' coming out the sides that shoot out flames. A graffiti paintjob taken from the elements of the streets; metal, steel, and strength like the Motor City.; Robb's vehicle: a 1980 Chevrolet pickup truck inspired by Hot Wheels: "Backdrafter", (first released in 2014) a modified firetruck with two V16 engines, eight exhausts, a rear wing, and a parachute. Called "Flamin' Fire Truck", it plays homage to his grandfather and father, who were firefighters before him. It has three-dimensional light-up dancing flames on the side. Curved ladders on each side to form a flamin' wing. And two sets of four fanned-out upturned steel "zoomies" exhaust pipes coming out of the hood.; Winner: Aldavid's "Spirit of Detroit"
| 4 | "Skater Boy vs. Jaipur Jewel" | June 20, 2023 | 104 | 1.84 |
Superfans Felix Arguelles, a former pro skateboarder (Los Angeles, California) and Arushi Garg, a mother proud of her Indian heritage (Houston, Texas) face-off by transforming two personal childhood vehicles from ordinary to extraordinary Hot Wheels. Sung Kang from Fast & Furious stops by to be a special guest judge who's had some of his cars turned into Hot Wheels, like the "Fugu-Z" (2015 Gran Turismo Best in Show winner). The Twist Element is the "Deora II" (debuted in 2000 as a modern twist on the original "Sweet 16 Deora" from 1968. It took the rear from a 1996 station wagon, putting it on the front. It was inducted into the Hot Wheels Hall of Fame, the "Garage of Legends" in 2003 by Jay Leno, and got a starring role in a Hot Wheels animated film) The Car Pool teams must remove one part from the original place on the car and move it elsewhere, or infuse the "Deora II" body shape in the build.: Felix's vehicle: an Early-1980s light blue Cadillac Coupe DeVille inspired by his Daddy's Caddy. Based on one of the 50 variations of Cadillac Hot Wheels. The finished product is "Skater Boy", it's transformed into a convertible Caddy mobile skatepark that's connected to a community hub has a quarter pipe skateboard ramp carved out of the trunk and metal grind rails on the sides with extra long double exhausts. It has a graffiti paintjob paying tribute to his skater lifestyle journey into a pro. For the twist, they attached the back fender to the front fender to make a wall ride skate ramp.; Arushi's vehicle: a 1980s Suzuki Maruti Omni (made for the Indian market only) based on the 1967 "Austin Mini", turning it into a "maxi minivan" called "Jaipur Jewel" with a larger stretched out body like her homestate of Texas and bright pink paintjob with the colors of India. It has six tires like the "Six Shooter", the first Hot Wheels to have six wheels (1971). And a massive V8 engine exposed in the back where the twist features a chopped off roof of the minivan to mimic the "Deora II".; Winner: Arushi's "Jaipur Jewel"
| 5 | "Need for Speed vs. Fight Car" | June 27, 2023 | 105 | 1.56 |
Two more superfans face-off to turn their very first vehicles from their childhoods into outrageous Hot Wheels. Professional wrestler, Angela Quentina Arnold from Giblertown, Alabama named "A.Q.A." and Caroline Johnson, a former F-18 Super Hornet weapons systems officer from Washington, D.C. TV personally Joel McHale is the special guest judge. The twist element in the design is "El Viento" (The Wind), a super fast electric vehicle is a whirlwind of itself. It has a removable canopy and an adjustable front splitter.: Angela's vehicle: a black 2010 Hyundai Elentra named "Viola" after actress Viola Davis turned into "Vendetta", which has a purple and chrome paintjob with the body cut in half to make way for a big wrestling ring in the middle. Called "Fight Car", inspired by Hot Wheels "Dirty Outlaw", a futuristic winged sprint car, this mobile wrestling ring has spikes and a giant 3-D skull coming out of the hood, a championship belt for the grill and huge tailpipes for pyrotechnics on the back. Twist: the championship belt is removable so the winner can hold it high at the end of a match.; Caroline's vehicle: a 1990s Nissan Sentra turned into a two-seat fighter jet based on the F-18 with a battleship gray paintjob. Called "Need For Speed", this vehicle is inspired by Hot Wheels "2 Jet Z", a cockpit on wheels, and the "Power Rocket", which has a giant jet engine going throughout the body. It has wings out of the sides, a real Tornado fighter jet canopy cockpit and an afterburner shooting flames out the back. Twist: make the canopy window automatically open and close.; Winner: Caroline's "Need For Speed"
| 6 | "Badge of Honor vs. Mountain Mover" | July 11, 2023 | 106 | 1.54 |
Two more superfans get their chance to transform nostalgic vehicles from their past into life-sized Hot Wheels of their dreams. First grade teacher Luidgi from Brooklyn, New York and retired police officer Terri Jones from Birmingham, Alabama get to make their ultimate Hot Wheels based on their lives with the Car Pool design team. Twist Element: "Lethal Diesel", a low-riding hot rod that's made out of scrap parts with a giant diesel engine, inspired by a Hummer H1. The designers must include a post-apocalyptic part in their builds.: Luidgi's vehicle: a 1996 gold Toyota Camry that's been through life's best and worst moments like driving to Manhattan to bring his young son, Miles to his cancer treatment. It's turned into a car that can go through anything just like "Miles' courage". Inspired by Hot Wheels "Volvo P1800", sporting a supercharged V8 and a unique stance for the drag strip, and "Armoured Racer", a motorized X-V racer based on an armored truck like the Humvee. Called "Mountain Mover", this vehicle features a dark to light sunset paintjob, an exposed V-8 engine signifying Miles' strength, and armored plating with a plow shield with an M for "Miracle Miles" being able to go off-road, and climb mountains with dually humongous wheels. Twist: steam punk style armor on the outside with Camry scrap parts, including gramophone horns turned into flowers.; Terri's vehicle: a 1995 black C4 Chevrolet Corvette convertible that was her-late police officer husband Ron's "date night" car turned into the "best police car Hot Wheels has ever made". Inspired by Hot Wheels Chevy die cast cars "Buzzbomb", based on a bee that features plastic hinged wings that double as butterfly doors. The "Badge of Honor" has scissor doors, an exposed chromed-out 5.7 V-8 engine, a "bowling ball" blue marble paintjob, blue & red police lights inside and out all under a hard-top convertible. Twist: create an exoskeleton armor panels on the outside.; Winner: Luidgi's "Mountain Mover"
| 7 | "Mardi Gras Mania vs. The Reaper" | July 18, 2023 | 107 | 1.46 |
Superfans Nick Harrison, a retired teacher from Hammond, Louisiana and Michael Cooney, a funeral director from Chicago, Illinois face-off in transforming their ordinary vehicles from their childhoods into extraordinary Hot Wheels. WWE Superstar Big E serves as the guest judge. The Twist: the French-inspired classic 1930s-style "Clock and Dagger" Hot Wheels, which both teams must incorporate a glow-in-the-dark element into their builds.: Nick's vehicle: 1984 black Chevrolet Monte Carlo that was his father's with fuzzy dice on the mirror. The Dream team transformed "Marti Gras Mania" into a Marti Gras 'party on wheels' with a big sound system, inspired by the Hot Wheels '86 Monte Carlo SS. It also has a parade float light-up dance floor platform in the back, plush purple interior with a gold foil wrap exterior inspired by "Double Vision" (metallic gold paint) and 26-inch gold rims.; Michael's vehicle: 1998 green Dodge Caravan called "The Death Van" that his family used for personal use and for their funeral home business. The Dream team transformed "The Reaper" into a monster truck inspired by the Hot Wheels "Battitude" (bat body frame on a high up wheel suspension), with a dark blue paint job that glows in the dark, and a grim reaper body with skeleton hands holding scythes on the sides.; Winner: Nick's "Mardi Gras Mania"
| 8 | "Metamorphosis vs. Racer Girl" | July 25, 2023 | 108 | 1.33 |
Two more superfans compete in who transforms their childhood vehicles into Hot Wheels masterpieces. Kris Porter, an educator from New York City and Lauren Partin, a third generation race car driver from Ohio, battle it out to see which one has the ultimate showstopper. The Twist is inspired by 2012 Hot Wheels "Mad Manga" (based on Japanese car culture called bōsōzoku that has anime-style speedster with wild exhausts, splitters, and paintjobs.: Kris's vehicle: 1994 green Dodge Neon turning it into a butterfly that lands on car for safety. Inspired by the Hot Wheels "Dragon Tail" dragonfly vehicle, the "Metamorphosis" has giant moving light-up butterfly flame wings on a Japanese-style neon on black paintjob, a massive V8 engine, two sets of 4-pipe 'antennae' exhausts and a Hot Wheels track running down the chopped off roof to the hood.; Lauren's vehicle: 2007 Ford Crown Victoria transformed into the "Racer Girl", a wide-bodied, suped-up, turbo, honoring her father's racing number (#4) on the sides. Inspired by Hot Wheels "Dirty Outlaw" sprint car, this total 'girly' race car is complete with a roll cage, double exhausts on both sides, racing tires with rhinestones on the rims, a disco ball light, playing homage to the police car spot light; all on a pink paintjob with purple flames.; Winner: Lauren's "Racer Girl"
| 9 | "Grand Finale, Part 1" | August 1, 2023 | 109 | 1.43 |
Eight qualifying superfan finalists who transformed their ordinary vehicles into extraordinary Hot Wheels, compete in the grand finale to create brand new life-sized Hot Wheels. The winner takes home an extra $50,000 and gets their design turned into a real die-cast Hot Wheels toy that will be added to the Hot Wheels line for consumers to purchase. Mattel Global Head of Design for Hot Wheels, Tim Wu who makes the final decision on which die-casts get produced is the special guest judge. Nick's "Mardi Gras Mania", Jim's "Power Charged", and Arushi's "Jaipur Jewel" move on the grand finale. They get a chance to make their original Hot Wheels full-sized designed vehicles immortalized into a 1:64th die-cast for consumers to buy. As the three superfans looked to their pasts vehicles for designs, this time they must use the "Inspirationator 5000" with over 800 most-iconic Hot Wheels die-casts to choose from. The first twist is a 1972 Chevrolet Corvette Stingray Convertible die-cast which has a fun easter-egg by shining a light under the chassis, the headlights turn on. Designers must include a surprise element in their builds. In order to find out who the Grand Finale celebrity guest judge will be, the hosts let the Inspirationator5000 give the clues. The first clue is a Mercedes-Benz 300SL, a real-life replica race car from the 1950s with a weathered race number. The second clue is the McLaren F1, sports car featuring a three-seat arrangement with the driver sitting in the middle. The third clue is a 1966 Chevrolet Corvair Yenko Stinger, a racetrack car only, this replica includes the owner's license plate "583V". The fourth clue is a Lamborghini Countach LP5000, there were only 610 of this legendary Italian supercar ever made. The fifth and final clue is a Tank Car, a custom hot-rod built exclusively for the celebrity guest judge and car guru, Jay Leno. All five cars are a part of comedian's personal collection.
| 10 | "Grand Finale, Part 2" | August 8, 2023 | 110 | 1.75 |
The Ultimate Hot Wheels Grand Finale continues with the superfans competing to be the Hot Wheels first season winner for a grand prize of $50,000 and their design turned into a real Hot Wheels die-cast for consumers to buy.: Nick's vehicle: "Blazin' Bird": a 1978 Pontiac Trans-Am Firebird, one of the best-selling muscle cars ever made and one of the longest die-cast models. Made popular with the Smokey and the Bandit movies. Drawing Inspiration from the "Hot Bird" and "Speed Shark" Hot Wheels models, it's transformed into a low-riding, suped-up sports car with a firebird aero fin on the roof like a powerful beak. The first twist element is pushing down the air scoop on the hood creating a lighting effect on the "phoenix" fire bird's eyes.; Jim's vehicle: "Superfan Van": a 1968 Volkswagen Bus, the most popular VW Hot Wheels is a dragster version featuring huge rear wheels that's the heaviest die-cast Mattel has ever made. The "Beach Bomb", a pink VW Bus is the most expensive and rarest die-cast ever. It's valued at half a million dollars. Inspired by the Hot Wheels "Rennan Rig", designed for the European truck racing circuit, it's transformed into a metallic purple flatbed front that's cut in half, adding a Formula 1 back with an exposed V8 engine and exhaust pipes in the middle. The first twist element is a secret closet door in the body that includes one of the designers jumpsuits.; Arushi's vehicle: "Rally Resilience": a Nissan Skyline R33, a street racing car gained global fame when it was featured in The Fast and The Furious, the first movie of the franchise. In the world of Motorsport, it is one of the most successful cars ever on the racetrack. Inspired by the lifted-up "Rally Speciale" Hot Wheels, it's transformed into an off-road 24-inch big-wheeled rally car with hood lights, a spare tire back-rack on top. The first twist element is using invisible ink with the message "Never Quit" on top of the roof.; Winner: Arushi's "Rally Resilience"

== Production ==
NBC announced that it ordered the competition reality show in March 2023. The show is produced by Endemol Shine North America, with Tim Warren acting as the showrunner. The show was filmed in Manchester, England at Space Studios Manchester from March–May 2023.

== Reception ==
Joel Keller at Decider noted that the episodes fall short when it comes to showing how much work goes into modifying each vehicle, but felt that the show was quite fun and it gives vibes of adults revisiting playtime with their childhood Hot Wheels. Mark Vaughn at Autoweek felt that the show was too contrived and scripted for a reality show, but he appreciated that the tone of the show remained positive and didn't include over-produced arguments or tantrums.

=== Ratings ===
Viewership and ratings per episode of Hot Wheels: Ultimate Challenge
| No. | Title | Air date | Rating (18–49) | Viewers (millions) | Ref. |
|---|---|---|---|---|---|
| 1 | "Cyber Slicker vs. Power Charged" | May 30, 2023 | 0.3 | 2.31 | |
| 2 | "Monster Bug vs. Buckaroo" | June 6, 2023 | 0.3 | 2.04 | |
| 3 | "Spirit of Detroit vs. Flamin' Fire Truck" | June 13, 2023 | 0.3 | 1.70 | |
| 4 | "Skater Boy vs. Jaipur Jewel" | June 20, 2023 | 0.3 | 1.84 | |
| 5 | "Need for Speed vs. Fight Car" | June 27, 2023 | 0.3 | 1.56 | |
| 6 | "Badge of Honor vs. Mountain Mover" | July 11, 2023 | 0.3 | 1.54 | |
| 7 | "Mardi Gras Mania vs. The Reaper" | July 18, 2023 | 0.2 | 1.46 | |
| 8 | "Metamorphosis vs. Racer Girl" | July 25, 2023 | 0.2 | 1.33 | |
| 9 | "Grand Finale, Part 1" | August 1, 2023 | 0.2 | 1.43 | |
| 10 | "Grand Finale, Part 2" | August 8, 2023 | 0.3 | 1.75 | |
