= The Prank Panel =

American reality comedy series

- Genre: Reality; Comedy
- Directed by: Alex Van Wagner
- Starring: Eric André; Johnny Knoxville; Gabourey Sidibe
- Country of origin: United States
- Original language: English
- No. of seasons: 1
- No. of episodes: 9

Production
- Executive producers: Matt Silverstein; Dave Jeser; Jimmy Kimmel; Scott Lonker; Johnny Knoxville; Eric André; Jordana Hochman; Bernie Schaeffer; Vin Rubino
- Producers: Knate Lee; Hilary Shields; Andrew Watnick; Richard DiLorenzo
- Cinematography: Jason Haffer; Tim Murphy
- Running time: 43 minutes
- Production companies: ITV America; Kimmelot; Walt Disney Television Alternative

Original release
- Network: ABC
- Release: May 24 – September 21, 2023

The Prank Panel is an American reality comedy series that aired on ABC from May 24, 2023, to September 21, 2023. The series features a panel of judges made up by Eric André, Johnny Knoxville, and Gabourey Sidibe hearing pitches of potential pranks from individuals who want to plot elaborate acts of comedy and revenge on individuals in their lives. If the judges like the pitch, they plan, perform, and record the prank.

== Production ==
The series was announced in November 2022.

Eric André quit filming the show multiple times due to Knoxville's incessant pranking of him, but he was finally coaxed to return with Knoxville making a truce.

=== Lawsuits ===
While filming in December 2022, a handyman hired via TaskRabbit sued Johnny Knoxville for emotional distress he experienced during a prank. The show has not been on air or in production since a lawsuit from Producer Daniel Curry allegedly states that Knoxville tased him without provocation, seeking $3 million in medical bills and damages.

== Episodes ==
Overview of The Prank Panel episodes
No.	Title	Original release date	Prod. code	U.S. viewers (millions)	Rating (18-49)
1	"Family Love / Repo Revenge"	May 24, 2023	101	1.90	0.2
Johnny Knoxville accepts a pitch from a man whose wife Al-x performs weddings and the crew tricks her into thinking that she has married a brother and sister, resulting in the loss of her license. The wedding is additionally plagued by a collapsing cake and a server who catches on fire, ending with Al-x's husband being arrested for helping illegally marry siblings. The second segment includes Marquis, a man whose friend Brandon is a repo man who performs his job without empathy for the victims of repossessions. Gabourey Sidibe agrees to take on the task and the group terrorize him by having a fake valet destroy a duplicate of Brandon's beloved car. During filming, Knoxville's Jackass co-star Rachel Wolfson pretends to be a stage manager who injures herself and has an emotional breakdown in front of contestants.
2	"Boyfriend from Hell / Send in the Clown"	July 9, 2023	102	2.53	0.3
Eric Andre accepts a pitch from a woman named Catherine(Jessica) to prank her father Paul by introducing him to her new boyfriend, a Satanist who lives with his grandmother and proposes to Catherine halfway through dinner. The second segment involves Knoxville and includes Susanna, an HR rep and actress who intends to prank her son Nathan by having a clown scare him at a haunted hotel. Instead, the producers recruit Nathan to turn the tables on his mother and prank her instead. The team has Nathan invite a prostitute to the hotel room. When the clown jumps out at Nathan, he fights back and pushes the clown out a fourth-floor window, followed by Nathan's arrest.
3	"Three Omens / Sexeee Granneee"	July 16, 2023	103	2.21	0.3
Knoxville helps a woman named Angel prank her friend by taking her to a fortune teller who gives her three omens and counteractions to find the man of her dreams. All three of the omens come true at a restaurant, including a waiter who accidentally sets himself on fire, followed by Angel failing to pull out a tablecloth. Knoxville and Sidibe help a makeup artist prank her grandmother Elyn (referred to as Sexeee) by having her watch a video shoot where the director has her give her input on what is sexy or not, leading to a dispute where a producer deploys knock-out gas on everyone in the room.
4	"Rashad's Revenge / Bollywood Audition"	July 23, 2023	104	2.20	0.3
Knoxville helps a man get revenge on his mother and grandmother for a prank they played on him when he was five. The two are taken to a haunted house where the homeowner accidentally spills an urn of ashes, followed by a series of paranormal events happening in a locked room. The prank fails when the two women are unfazed by any of the paranormal happenings. Sidibe helps a man prank his Bollywood-obsessed friend Brijesh. At a fake audition, Brijesh meets another man auditioning, who he gets along with until the man shoots the arrogant show villain with a nail gun. The man then tries to get Brijesh to press a detonator and reveals it was a prank when he refuses.
5	"Influencer from Hell / Second Family"	July 27, 2023	105	1.98	0.3
Andre helps a man prank his friend, a stylist. The friend is sent to help with an egotistical influencer painter, but when she plugs in her equipment a power outbreak sets one of the paintings on fire. After the artist knocks a pizza onto the deliveryman, he uses her jacket as a napkin, and when another stylist works on her the artist's hair begins falling out. But when the art dealer (Andre) arrives, he praises the burnt painting and buys it. Knoxville helps a man named Leo from Rio prank his husband on a Sibide-hosted talk show where the audience is not in the loop. Leo and his husband are invited on stage, where Sidibe invites Leo's secret family to the stage. At the end of the prank, the boy's mother reveals she is pregnant with another child, shortly after which the prank is revealed.
6	"Mom on Mom / Chop Shop Double Cross"	August 3, 2023	108	1.76	0.2
Sidibe and Knoxville try to help a woman prank her friend, but the friend catches on and notices the hidden cameras. Instead they invite a different mark, who is asked to watch by a mother to watch her son at a store. The boy steals money from the cash register and destroys a shelf, at which point a security guard and detective enter, the latter of whom reveals the boy is actually a 42-year-old fugitive. Andre and Sidibe help two men prank their electrician friend Calvin, but they decide to double cross them instead. The day before the shoot they film a reenactment of the prank, where Calvin does electric work for a group of criminals. Using a stunt double, they make it seem as if Calvin was fatally electrocuted.
7	"Gullible Granny / Pageant Problems"	August 17, 2023	107	1.62	0.2
Andre helps a woman prank her grandmother by sending her to a fake knee doctor. After the doctor inquires about her stool, he performs an x-ray that supposedly shows a worm living in her knee and moves up her body out her right ear before Andre (posing as a doctor) eats it. Sidibe and Knoxville help a man prank his Filipino American pageant queen cousin Jessica. At a pageant hosted by John Stamos, Jessica encounters a second Miss Philippines who is rude and dismissive. After the queens (who aside from Miss Philippines are unaware of the prank) are questioned by inmates, the show takes a break, whereupon Jessica notices Stamos and Miss Philippines entering a room together. As the show finishes Stamos introduces the president of the pageant company, Jessica's cousin.
8	"Electrician Stepdad / Spa-Mageddon"	September 14, 2023	109	1.30	0.2
9	"Bride Swap / Furry Double Cross"	September 21, 2023	110	1.39	0.2

== See also ==
- 2023 in American television
