= Totally Weird and Funny =

American reality television series

- Genre: Comedy clip show
- Directed by: Chris Merrill
- Presented by: Mikalah Gordon; Brian Cooper; Noah Matthews
- Country of origin: United States
- Original language: English
- No. of seasons: 1
- No. of episodes: 16

Production
- Executive producers: David McKenzie; David Martin; Laura McKenzie
- Running time: 21 minutes
- Production company: Associated Television International

Original release
- Network: The CW
- Release: April 8 – June 24, 2023

Totally Weird and Funny (also known as Totally Weird and Funny Videos) is an American clip show television series that premiered on April 8, 2023 on The CW. A production of Associated Television International (ATI), it is hosted by Mikalah Gordon, Brian Cooper, and Noah Matthews, with Matthews also serving as a writer and producer on the show; the three have been recurring commentators on another CW program, the similarly formatted World's Funniest Animals, also produced by ATI.

== Format ==
In each episode, the hosts curate a collection of strange and humorous video clips sourced from the internet, social media, and elsewhere, with each host selecting ten clips of their own; a studio audience votes on these clips to determine which one is declared the evening's weirdest or funniest video and earns a place in the show's "hall of fame". Also featured during each episode is a game entitled "Real or Fake", in which the hosts present three unusual consumer products (similar to As Seen on TV products), only one of which is real; the studio audience and home viewers are then asked to identify the real product.

== Episodes ==
No.	Title	Original release date	Prod. code	U.S. viewers (millions)
1	"Backyard Theme Parks, Balcony Boating & Car Gardens"	April 8, 2023	115	0.33
2	"Trombone Exhausts, Spy Babies & Three Pounds Of Marshmallows"	April 8, 2023	114	0.29
3	"Disposable Laptops, Giant Cowboy Hats, and Baguette Slippers"	April 15, 2023	107	0.34
4	"Tattoo Mishaps, Embarrassing Dads & Pet VR"	April 22, 2023	113	0.20
5	"Flaming Bagpipes, Superheroes & Floor Sandwiches"	April 29, 2023	101	0.30
6	"Dancing Astronauts, Modern Mimes & Cheese Printers"	May 6, 2023	102	0.17
7	"Airplane Laundry, Robot Babies & Pets Who Clean the House"	May 13, 2023	103	0.19
8	"Optical Illusions, Pool Fishing, & The Dad Band"	May 20, 2023	104	0.21
9	"Rooftop Skiing, Wedding Disasters, and Car Saunas"	June 3, 2023	105	0.14
10	"Magic Carpets, Angry Golfers & Cheeseburger Phones"	June 3, 2023	106	0.12
11	"Horse Wakeboarding, Dirtbike Plumbing & Cargo Socks"	June 10, 2023	108	0.21
12	"Dancing Pandas, Train Horn Alarms & Chicken Friends"	June 10, 2023	109	0.20
13	"Juggling Drummers, Moving Mannequins & Bacon Soap"	June 17, 2023	110	0.18
14	"Dunking Mascots, Driving Couches & Snack Hats"	June 17, 2023	111	0.22
15	"Dinosaur Wheelies, Trickster Barbers, and Desktop Boxing"	June 24, 2023	112	0.26
16	"Aliens, Leaf Blower Basketball & Fish Flip Flops"	June 24, 2023	116	0.23

== Reception ==
Viewership and ratings per episode of Totally Weird and Funny
No.	Title	Air date	Rating (18–49)	Viewers (millions)
1	"Backyard Theme Parks, Balcony Boating & Car Gardens"	April 8, 2023	0.0	0.33
2	"Trombone Exhausts, Spy Babies & Three Pounds Of Marshmallows"	April 8, 2023	0.0	0.29
3	"Disposable Laptops, Giant Cowboy Hats, and Baguette Slippers"	April 15, 2023	0.1	0.34
4	"Tattoo Mishaps, Embarrassing Dads & Pet VR"	April 22, 2023	0.0	0.20
5	"Flaming Bagpipes, Superheroes & Floor Sandwiches"	April 29, 2023	0.0	0.30
6	"Dancing Astronauts, Modern Mimes & Cheese Printers"	May 6, 2023	0.0	0.17
7	"Airplane Laundry, Robot Babies & Pets Who Clean the House"	May 13, 2023	0.0	0.19
8	"Optical Illusions, Pool Fishing, & The Dad Band"	May 20, 2023	0.0	0.21
9	"Rooftop Skiing, Wedding Disasters, and Car Saunas"	June 3, 2023	0.0	0.14
10	"Magic Carpets, Angry Golfers & Cheeseburger Phones"	June 3, 2023	0.0	0.12
11	"Horse Wakeboarding, Dirtbike Plumbing & Cargo Socks"	June 10, 2023	0.0	0.21
12	"Dancing Pandas, Train Horn Alarms & Chicken Friends"	June 10, 2023	0.0	0.20
13	"Juggling Drummers, Moving Mannequins & Bacon Soap"	June 17, 2023	0.0	0.18
14	"Dunking Mascots, Driving Couches & Snack Hats"	June 17, 2023	0.0	0.22
15	"Dinosaur Wheelies, Trickster Barbers, and Desktop Boxing"	June 24, 2023	0.0	0.26
16	"Aliens, Leaf Blower Basketball & Fish Flip Flops"	June 24, 2023	0.0	0.23

=== Critical response ===
Writing for Common Sense Media, Melissa Camacho gave the series two out of five stars, writing that "...while some of the clips on Totally Weird and Funny may make you chuckle, the hosts' commentary about them make them feel less amusing..."
