= Greatest Geek Year Ever: 1982 =

2023 television documentary series

- Genre: Docuseries
- Written by: Mark A. Altman
- Directed by: Roger Lay Jr.
- Country of origin: United States
- Original language: English
- No. of episodes: 4

Production
- Executive producer: Berge Garabedian
- Producers: Mark A. Altman; Roger Lay Jr.; Scott Mantz; Thomas P. Vitale; Eric Carnagey; Aaron Rattner
- Production companies: JoBlo Movie Productions; Lay-Carnagey Entertainment; Radioactive Fishtank; The Wrath Of 1982

Original release
- Network: The CW
- Release: July 8 – July 29, 2023

Greatest Geek Year Ever: 1982 is a four-part American television documentary miniseries about moviegoing culture in 1982. It premiered on July 8, 2023 on The CW.

== Episodes ==
No.	Title	Original release date	Prod. code	U.S viewers (millions)	Rating (18-49)
1	"Chapter One: The Summer of Spielberg"	July 8, 2023	101	0.250	0.04
2	"Chapter Two: Science-Fiction"	July 15, 2023	102	0.195	0.03
3	"Chapter Three; Fantasy & Action"	July 22, 2023	103	0.192	0.04
4	"Chapter Four: Comedy & Horror"	July 29, 2023	104	0.237	0.04
