= Penske Entertainment =

American entertainment company

- Type: Private
- Industry: Sports
- Founded: 2019; 7 years ago
- Founder: Roger Penske
- Headquarters: Indianapolis Motor Speedway, 4790 W 16th Street, Speedway, Indiana, US
- Key people: Roger Penske (Chairman); Mark Miles (President)
- Owner: Penske Corporation (67%); Fox Corporation (33%)
- Website: www.penske.com

Penske Entertainment Corp. is an American entertainment company headquartered at the Indianapolis Motor Speedway in Speedway, Indiana. The company is owned by the Penske Corporation and the Fox Corporation following a minority stake acquisition by Fox in July 2025. The company also owns the IndyCar auto racing sanctioning body, the Indianapolis Motor Speedway Radio Network, the Grand Prix Association of Long Beach, and Detroit Grand Prix, Inc.

== History ==
In November 2019, with the formation of Penske Entertainment, Roger Penske, who's team had competed in the IndyCar Series since 1968, had acquired the Indianapolis Motor Speedway, the home of the Indianapolis 500, IndyCar, LLC, and their parent company Hulman & Company for an estimated $250 million to $350 million. The acquisition was completed in 2020 and also saw the restructuring of the Detroit Grand Prix under Penske Entertainment ownership.

Shortly after the acquisition, Penske Entertainment had begun renovations to the Indianapolis Motor Speedway including upgrades to existing infrastructure at the race track such as widening and re-paving walkways behind the grandstands of the track, thirty new video boards being installed around the frontstretch, and a 104-foot (32 m) video screen on the back of the Pagoda in the Pagoda Plaza along with general repairs, upgrades to the track's internet infrastructure and lighting, and the victory lane. In the summer of 2020, the first GMR Grand Prix, Brickyard 400, and Indianapolis 500 under Penske Entertainment ownership were held. The GMR Grand Prix and Indianapolis 500 were originally scheduled to be held in May but were postponed due to the COVID-19 pandemic and had to be held behind closed doors.

In 2021, the first Detroit Grand Prix under Penske Entertainment ownership was held after a one-year absence due to the COVID-19 pandemic. Following the 2022 Detroit Grand Prix, the race was moved to a temporary street course in Downtown Detroit in 2023.

On March 28, 2024, former Champ Car owner Gerald Forsythe purchased a 50% stake in race organizer Grand Prix Association of Long Beach owned by the estate of the late Kevin Kalkhoven, giving him full ownership of the race. Later that year, Penske Entertainment acquired the organization from Forsythe for an undisclosed amount. On January 22, 2025, Penske Entertainment took over promotional operations for the Music City Grand Prix, a race which was first held from 2021 to 2023 on a temporary street course at Nissan Stadium in Nashville and from 2024 to 2026 at the Nashville Superspeedway in Lebanon, Tennessee.

On July 31, 2025, one year after the announcement of an exclusive television deal with Fox Sports, the sports division of the Fox Corporation, to air the IndyCar Series and Indy NXT, the Fox Corporation announced that they had purchased a one-third stake in Penske Entertainment.

From August 21–23, 2026, Penske Entertainment held the inaugural Freedom 250 Grand Prix at the National Mall in Washington, D.C. in partnership with Freedom 250 LLC, a public–private White House task force established on January 29, 2025, by executive order of President of the United States Donald Trump.

== Assets ==
- IndyCar, LLC
  - Indianapolis Motor Speedway
  - Indianapolis Motor Speedway Radio Network
- Detroit Grand Prix Inc.
- Grand Prix Association of Long Beach
