= The Game Show Show =

2023 television documentary series

- Genre: Documentary
- Country of origin: United States
- Original language: English
- No. of episodes: 4

Production
- Executive producers: David Brady; Kate Harrison Karman; Sarah Gibson; John Ealer; David Sloan; Victoria Thompson
- Running time: 42 minutes
- Production companies: ABC News Studios; Cream Productions; Entertainment One

Original release
- Network: ABC
- Release: May 10 – May 30, 2023

The Game Show Show is an American television documentary miniseries about the history of game shows. It premiered on ABC on May 10, 2023. The series features interviews from former and current game show hosts.

== Episodes ==
No.	Title	Original release date	Prod. code	U.S. viewers (millions)	Rating (18-49)
1	"Chapter One: The Answer Is..."	May 10, 2023	101	2.73	0.3/3
2	"Chapter Two: Show Me The Money"	May 17, 2023	102	2.07	0.3/3
3	"Chapter Three: Over The Top"	May 24, 2023	103	1.47	0.2/2
4	"Chapter Four: Sex, Love or Money?"	May 30, 2023	104	1.78	0.2/3

=== Chapter One: The Answer Is... ===
The first episode, which aired on May 10, 2023, discusses the early history of game shows from the 1950s quiz scandals to the introduction of Who Wants to Be a Millionaire in 1999, a show which changed the landscape of television and brought a revival of game show interest. The show also mentions the origins of Jeopardy!, which was created as a direct result of the quiz show scandals. In the 1950s, television networks decided to rig game shows in an attempt to boost their ratings, but eventually failed once contestants came forward saying that the shows were rigged. As a result, laws were introduced to prevent game shows from future rigging, the most notable being the Prohibited Practices in Contests of Knowledge, Skill, or Chance law, which bars television or radio stations from rigging game shows. If law is broken, stations may face a $10,000 fine or one year in prison for those responsible for cheating.

=== Chapter Two: Show Me The Money ===
The second episode, which aired on May 17, talks about the history of "Big Money" game shows going back to the 1950s. The episode goes into how networks needed a new format for game shows after the quiz show scandals of the 1950s. The episode begins with the original NBC version of The Price Is Right before moving on to the 1972 revival of the series with a look at the scandal of Ted Slauson who was able to make a perfect bid on the Showcase Round thanks to his research of the show and its infrequent use of new prizes and the similar scandal with Michael Larson who was able to win the largest ever single-day amount of money on the show Press Your Luck. The show then talks about how the shows were immune to the same scandal involving quiz shows because the games just involved playing with the goal of winning as much money as possible. The series also moves to Wheel of Fortune and daytime TV show Let's Make a Deal before it ends with a look at the primetime show Deal or No Deal and how the show is popular simply because of its simple gameplay that does not require a lot of learning or strategy.

=== Chapter Three: Over The Top ===
Airing on May 24, this episode looks at the history of competition game shows as well as "reality game shows" where members of the audience directly participate in on-screen activities. The episode begins with the original contest show Truth or Consequences and then looks back at the groundbreaking popularity of American Ninja Warrior before going into the boom of reality contest shows of the 1990s and 2000s. It looks briefly at game shows from the network Nickelodeon such as Double Dare which put children into physical gameplay challenges. Afterwards it digs into reality contest shows of the 1990s including Big Brother, Survivor, The Amazing Race. The show then moves to the 2000s with a look at stunt shows such as Fear Factor along with the controversy that led to its cancellation, music and talent shows including American Idol. The episode ends with a look at the business contest series The Celebrity Apprentice and how Donald Trump was able to use the money and viewership from the series to save his businesses and run for President.

=== Chapter Four: Sex, Love, or Money? ===
The final episode aired on May 30 focuses on dating contest shows. The episode begins by explaining that network executives wanted a new format of game show that would attract younger audiences, and decided on the idea of shows about dating. The show introduces the idea of dating shows with a look back at The Dating Game as well as The Newlywed Game and Love Connection. The show also moves to the MTV series Singled Out and how it revamped the dating show with a younger image and allowing for queer relationships. The last half of the episode focuses on reality dating shows, namely The Bachelor and its spinoff The Bachelorette.

== Reception ==
=== Critical response ===
The show received a generally positive reception, receiving an overall rating of 6.9 on IMDb. Joel Keller of Decider described it as "more informative for the casual fan" but that those very knowledgeable about game shows may not learn much.
