= Cool Cat =

Cool Cat may refer to:

- Cool Cat (album), an album by jazz trumpeter/vocalist Chet Baker
- Cool Cat (book), a picture book by Nonny Hogrogian
- Cool Cat (film), a 1967 animated cartoon film
- Cool Cat (Looney Tunes), a Warner Bros. cartoon character
- Cool Cat (Pee-wee's Playhouse), a character from the television series Pee-wee's Playhouse
- "Cool Cat", a song by Queen from the album Hot Space
- "Cool Cats" (Scrubs), an episode of Scrubs
- Cool Cat Saves the Kids, a 2015 independent children's film
- Cool Cat, a 2023 orchestral composition by composer Adam Schoenberg

== See also ==
- Cool for Cats (disambiguation)
