= World's Funniest Animals =

2020 American video clip television series

- Genre: Comedy clip show
- Directed by: Noah Matthews and Brad Thomas
- Presented by: Elizabeth Stanton
- Country of origin: United States
- Original language: English
- No. of seasons: 4
- No. of episodes: 68 (and 6 specials)

Production
- Executive producers: Laura McKenzie; David McKenzie; David Martin
- Running time: 30 minutes
- Production company: Associated Television International

Original release
- Network: The CW
- Release: September 18, 2020 – August 29, 2024

Related
- The World's Funniest Moments

World's Funniest Animals is an American video clip television series produced by Associated Television International that premiered on The CW on September 18, 2020.

== Premise ==
Following a format similar to America's Funniest Home Videos/The Planet's Funniest Animals, the series showcases viral internet clips of funny animal moments as well as celebrity guests, their pets, and panelists to commentate on the clips.

== Episodes ==
=== Series overview ===
Season	Episodes	Originally released	
Season	Episodes	First released	Last released
1	16	September 18, 2020	January 14, 2021
2	16	October 9, 2021	April 2, 2022
3	18	October 22, 2022	March 18, 2023
4	18	November 6, 2023	August 29, 2024
Specials	6	April 30, 2021	March 19, 2022

=== Season 1 (2020–21) ===
No. overall	No. in season	Title	Original release date	Guest(s)	U.S. viewers (millions)
1	1	"Episode 101"	September 18, 2020	Tom Arnold & Natalie Lander	0.78
2	2	"Episode 102"	September 18, 2020	Dee Wallace	0.82
3	3	"Episode 103"	September 25, 2020	James Maslow	0.75
4	4	"Episode 104"	October 2, 2020	Murray SawChuck	0.71
5	5	"Episode 105"	October 9, 2020	Brittany Underwood	0.66
6	6	"Episode 106"	October 16, 2020	Ace Young & Diana DeGarmo	0.70
7	7	"Episode 107"	October 23, 2020	Murray Jennifer Taylor	0.64
8	8	"Episode 108"	October 30, 2020	Garrett Clayton	0.74
9	9	"Episode 109"	November 6, 2020	Danielle Nicolet	0.59
10	10	"Episode 110"	November 20, 2020	Jennifer Veal	0.61
11	11	"Episode 111"	November 27, 2020	Kelli Goss	0.99
12	12	"Episode 112"	December 3, 2020	Jessica Morris & Dan Sperry	0.61
13	13	"Episode 113"	December 17, 2020	Brielle Barbusca & Bradford Anderson	0.58
14	14	"Episode 114"	January 5, 2021	Toby Rand	0.86
15	15	"Episode 115"	January 14, 2021	Stephen Kramer Glickman	0.74
16	16	"Episode 116"	January 14, 2021	Griffin Gluck	0.67

=== Season 2 (2021–22) ===
No. overall	No. in season	Title	Original release date	Guest(s)	U.S. viewers (millions)
17	1	"Episode 201"	October 9, 2021	Colin Mochrie	0.59
18	2	"Episode 202"	October 9, 2021	Molly McCook	0.55
19	3	"Episode 203"	October 16, 2021	Parker Bates	0.47
20	4	"Episode 204"	October 23, 2021	Amara Zaragoza	0.49
21	5	"Episode 205"	November 6, 2021	Maz Jobrani	0.42
22	6	"Episode 206"	November 13, 2021	Amy Gumenick	0.57
23	7	"Episode 207"	November 20, 2021	Neil Brown Jr.	0.48
24	8	"Episode 208"	January 8, 2022	Lola Flanery	0.44
25	9	"Episode 209"	January 15, 2022	Percy Daggs III	0.37
26	10	"Episode 210"	January 22, 2022	Christina Ochoa	0.44
27	11	"Episode 211"	January 29, 2022	Bob Morley	0.50
28	12	"Episode 212"	February 26, 2022	Tiera Skovbye	0.44
29	13	"Episode 213"	March 5, 2022	Jayson Blair	0.44
30	14	"Episode 214"	March 12, 2022	Sarah Jeffery	0.31
31	15	"Episode 215"	March 26, 2022	Jackie Seiden	0.52
32	16	"Episode 216"	April 2, 2022	Jackie Tohn	0.38

=== Season 3 (2022–23) ===
No. overall	No. in season	Title	Original release date	Guest(s)	U.S. viewers (millions)
33	1	"Episode 301"	October 22, 2022	Gregg Sulkin	0.45
34	2	"Episode 302"	October 22, 2022	Kaci Walfall	0.45
35	3	"Episode 303"	October 29, 2022	Lucas Grabeel	0.38
36	4	"Episode 304"	November 5, 2022	Katie Leclerc	0.33
37	5	"Episode 305"	November 12, 2022	Kennedy McMann	0.36
38	6	"Episode 306"	November 19, 2022	Kelly Stables	0.40
39	7	"Episode 307"	December 3, 2022	Brec Bassinger	0.44
40	8	"Episode 308"	December 10, 2022	Gilles Marini	0.43
41	9	"Episode 309"	January 14, 2023	Sara Waisglass	0.45
42	10	"Episode 310"	January 21, 2023	Derrex Brady	0.35
43	11	"Episode 311"	January 28, 2023	Niiko X Swae	0.47
44	12	"Episode 312"	February 4, 2023	Dichen Lachman	0.51
45	13	"Episode 313"	February 11, 2023	Patrika Darbo	0.50
46	14	"Episode 314"	February 18, 2023	Cameron Mathison	0.46
47	15	"Episode 315"	February 25, 2023	Jason Ebs	0.48
48	16	"Episode 316"	March 4, 2023	Joshua Milrad	0.48
49	17	"Episode 317"	March 11, 2023	Tony Denison	0.42
50	18	"Episode 318"	March 18, 2023	Mel & Zane Lamprey	0.37

=== Season 4 (2023–24) ===
No. overall	No. in season	Title	Original release date	Guest(s)	U.S. viewers (millions)
51	1	"Episode 418"	November 6, 2023	N/A	0.31
52	2	"Episode 417"	November 13, 2023	N/A	0.24
53	3	"Episode 416"	November 20, 2023	N/A	0.21
54	4	"Episode 415"	November 27, 2023	N/A	0.28
55	5	"Episode 401"	December 4, 2023	N/A	0.32
56	6	"Episode 402"	January 12, 2024	N/A	0.39
57	7	"Episode 403"	January 19, 2024	N/A	0.36
58	8	"Episode 404"	January 26, 2024	N/A	0.36
59	9	"Episode 405"	June 20, 2024	N/A	0.26
60	10	"Episode 406"	June 27, 2024	N/A	0.28
61	11	"Episode 407"	July 4, 2024	N/A	0.26
62	12	"Episode 408"	July 11, 2024	N/A	0.34
63	13	"Episode 409"	July 18, 2024	N/A	0.36
64	14	"Episode 410"	July 25, 2024	N/A	0.34
65	15	"Episode 411"	August 8, 2024	N/A	0.19
66	16	"Episode 412"	August 15, 2024	N/A	0.28
67	17	"Episode 413"	August 22, 2024	N/A	0.31
68	18	"Episode 414"	August 29, 2024	N/A	0.32

=== Specials (2021–22) ===
No.	Title	Original release date	Guest(s)	U.S. viewers (millions)
1	"Spring Fling"	April 30, 2021	N/A	0.81
2	"Summer Fling"	August 4, 2021	Ed Alonzo & Bob the Duck	0.67
3	"Halloween"	October 30, 2021	Robert Englund	0.51
4	"Christmas"	December 1, 2021	Kayla Compton	0.43
5	"Valentines Day"	February 12, 2022	N/A	0.60
6	"National Puppy Day Special"	March 19, 2022	Lissette Rojo	0.49

== Development ==
On May 14, 2020, The CW announced that in light of television production being suspended across the United States on account of the COVID-19 pandemic, the network would push its new season to January 2021 and would air acquired and encore programming in the fall of 2020 instead. This gave rise to World's Funniest Animals, as the series consists mainly of a compilation of comic animal clips from various sources and thus is easy to be produced largely remotely. Shortly after, it was announced that the series would be hosted by Elizabeth Stanton. On August 17, 2020, it was announced that the series would premiere on September 18, 2020. On December 7, 2020, the series was renewed for a second season, which premiered on October 9, 2021. On January 20, 2022, the series was renewed for a third season, which premiered on October 22, 2022. On May 18, 2023, The CW renewed the series for a fourth season.
