= List of Penn Zero: Part-Time Hero episodes =

Penn Zero: Part-Time Hero is an American animated television series produced by Disney Television Animation for Disney XD. The series debuted on December 5, 2014, as a preview, followed by the official premiere on February 13, 2015. The series was ordered on October 16, 2013, for a scheduled fall 2014 premiere.

On April 22, 2015, it was announced that the series had been renewed for a second season. On July 19, 2016, it was announced that the show would be ending after two seasons. The second season premiered on July 10, 2017. This series was discontinued on July 28, 2017.

== Series overview ==
Season	Segments	Episodes	Originally released	
Season	Segments	Episodes	First released	Last released
1	38	21	December 5, 2014	October 1, 2015
2	23	14	July 10, 2017	July 28, 2017

== Episodes ==
=== Season 1 (2014–15) ===
Mercury Filmworks provided the animation for this season.

No. overall	No. in season	Title	Directed by	Written by	Storyboard by	Original release date	Prod. code	US viewers (millions)
1	1	"North Pole Down"	Adam Henry and Tom De Rosier	Story by : Jared Bush and Sam Levine; Teleplay by : Jeff Poliquin	Joseph S. Scott and Heiko Drengenberg	December 5, 2014	101	N/A
Penn doesn't want to celebrate Christmas because his parents won't be there. However, he is sent to the North Pole to fill in for Santa Claus to save Christmas. Guest star: Henry Winkler as The Snowman
2a	2a	"Chicken or Fish?"	Chuckles Austen	Jared Bush and Sam Levine	Stu Livingston	February 13, 2015	102	2.91
Penn, Boone, and Sashi are zapped into an underwater world to save a merfolk society from an army of cephalopod people, but their mission becomes complicated when Penn finds out that Boone is afraid of water.
2b	2b	"The Old Old West"	Adam Henry	Jared Bush and Sam Levine	Wolf-Rüdiger Bloss	February 13, 2015	102	2.91
When Penn and his team are zapped into an Old West world where cowboys ride dinosaurs, the town sheriff joins them on their mission to prove he still has what it takes. Guest star: Beau Bridges as Sheriff Scaley Briggs
3a	3a	"Babypocalypse"	Tom De Rosier	Kenny Byerly	Kathleen Good	February 14, 2015	103	0.62
Penn, Boone, and Sashi are zapped into a world of living plush animals to save the town's mayor from giant babies. Guest star: Diana Rigg as Mayor Pink Panda
3b	3b	"That Purple Girl"	Chuckles Austen	Julia Miranda	Brandon Warren	February 14, 2015	103	0.62
Penn and Boone's friendship is put to the test when they both fall for a beautiful alien princess whom they must escort through the jungle back to her tribe. Guest star: Elizabeth Henstridge as Princess Argelbleccht Blunkenthorthph
4a	4a	"I'm Super!"	Adam Henry	Jase Ricci	Joseph S. Scott	February 15, 2015	104	0.53
When Penn, Boone, and Sashi are zapped into a world where everyone has superpowers, Penn learns that you don't have to have superpowers to be a hero. Guest star: Adam West as Captain Super Captain
4b	4b	"The Fast and the Floor Rugs"	Tom De Rosier	Jared Bush and Sam Levine	Heiko Drengenberg	February 15, 2015	104	0.53
After Penn and his team are zapped into a desert world filled with flying carpets, Penn begins to question Boone's abilities as the team's wise man.
5a	5a	"Brainzburgerz"	Chuckles Austen	Story by : Jared Bush and Sam Levine; Teleplay by : Jase Ricci	Stu Livingston	February 16, 2015	105	0.69
Exhausted from recent missions, Penn is relieved when he is zapped into a seemingly ordinary job as a food court employee in a mall, but it turns out that Penn and his team are in a world where a zombie apocalypse is taking place. Guest star: Michael-Leon Wooley as General
5b	5b	"Chuckle City"	Adam Henry	Story by : Jared Bush and Sam Levine; Teleplay by : Kenny Byerly	Wolf-Rüdiger Bloss	February 16, 2015	105	0.69
When Penn, Boone, and Sashi are zapped into a clown world as clown cops, Sashi must tap into her silly side to save the mission. Guest star: Garry Marshall as Soda Jerk
6a	6a	"Flurgle Burgle"	Tom De Rosier	Story by : Jared Bush and Sam Levine; Teleplay by : Kenny Byerly	Kathleen Good	February 23, 2015	106	0.69
Penn becomes concerned that Sashi takes her role as a sidekick too seriously. Meanwhile, he and his team are zapped into a new world as spaceship heroes to save a starship from destruction, but the mission is complicated when Sashi accidentally turns Penn into a weird space animal. Guest stars: George Takei and Lauren Tom as Sylvester and Tia Kobayashi
6b	6b	"Temple of the Porcelain God"	Chuckles Austen	Kenny Byerly	Brandon Warren and Jean-Sebastien Duclos	February 23, 2015	106	0.69
Phyllis has Penn and his team watch a play-back of a just-completed mission in which they were explorers in a race against time to return an idol to a temple while being chased by Rippen and a giant man-eating toilet.
7a	7a	"Defending the Earth"	Adam Henry	Jeff Poliquin	Joseph S. Scott	March 16, 2015	107	0.47
When the team is zapped into a world where Penn is president, Sashi is a general, and Boone is a Supreme Court justice, Boone finds himself on the most popular game show in the galaxy, where he must plead his case and compete against Rippen in an outrageous contest that will determine the fate of the Earth. However, Boone has stage fright. Guest stars: Chris Parnell as Judge Blort Clooney, Bruce Vilanch as himself
7b	7b	"Number One, Number Two"	Tom De Rosier	Paiman Kalayeh	Joe Oh	March 16, 2015	107	0.47
While in a medieval world, Rippen holds tryouts to replace Larry as his number two, and Penn goes undercover as Rippen's new minion to find a village's stolen gold.
8a	8a	"3 Big Problems"	Chuckles Austen	Kevin Hylton and Mike Winn	Stu Livingston	March 23, 2015	108	0.39
Penn and his team are zapped into a world where they are enormous and misunderstood monsters. They must convince the human president of a nearby island city that the monsters don't intend to cause harm. Guest star: Maria Bamford as The President
8b	8b	"Cereal Criminals"	Adam Henry	Kenny Byerly	Wolf-Rüdiger Bloss	March 23, 2015	108	0.39
In a world populated by cereal mascots and where cereal is grown on farms, Penn seeks the help of an imprisoned Rippen to catch The Milk Man, a villain threatening to flood all the cereal crops with milk, turning them soggy. Guest star: Paul Reubens as The Milk Man
9a	9a	"I'm Still Super!"	Tom De Rosier	Jase Ricci	Heiko Drengenberg	April 6, 2015	109	0.68
Penn, Boone, and Sashi are zapped back to the superhero world to help Captain Super Captain defeat his twin supervillain brother Professor Evil Professor, who has turned all the superheroes evil. Guest star: Adam West as Captain Super Captain, Professor Evil Professor
9b	9b	"Balls!"	Chuckles Austen	Jeff Poliquin	Brandon Warren	April 6, 2015	109	0.68
Concerned about his abilities as a leader, Penn and his team are zapped into a world populated by sentient sports balls to teach the other balls to defend themselves from their enemies. Guest stars: Kari Wahlgren as Bowling Ball, Brian Posehn as Beach Ball Grandpappy
10a	10a	"The Princess Most Fair"	Tom De Rosier	Jase Ricci	Kathleen Good	April 27, 2015	110	0.36
The team zaps into a musical medieval world where people sing as they speak. Penn is a princess, Sashi is a knight, and Boone is a fairy godmother. During their mission to save the queen from being turned to stone, their true feelings come out in song. Guest star: Rena Strober as Queen
10b	10b	"Hail Larry"	Adam Henry	Paiman Kalayeh	Joseph S. Scott	April 27, 2015	110	0.36
Larry becomes an acting part-time villain as he substitutes for his ill partner Rippen. The team's mission is endangered when Penn takes pity on Larry.
11a	11a	"It's a Colorful Life"	Chuckles Austen	Elizabeth Rinehart	Stu Livingston	June 1, 2015	111	0.35
When Penn and his team are zapped into a world where the colorful Hues and the gray Drabs are in a feud, they must stop Rippen from destroying the rainbow rocks which provide the world's colors. Guest stars: Pamela Adlon as Drab Lieutenant, Harland Williams as Helper Hue, Maurice LaMarche as narrator
11b	11b	"Larry Manor"	Adam Henry	Jase Ricci	Wolf-Rüdiger Bloss	June 1, 2015	111	0.35
Dimension zapping is suspended when the power goes out on the whole block, so Larry invites Rippen, Penn, Boone, and Sashi to his mansion. When Larry's pet elephant goes missing, Penn and Rippen compete to see who can find him first. Meanwhile, when the power comes back on, Phyllis and Phil battle each other in another dimension. Guest stars: Maria Bamford as Matthews, Maurice LaMarche as Fredricks
12a	12a	"Lady Starblaster"	Tom De Rosier	Jeff Poliquin	Kathleen Good	June 8, 2015	112	0.46
While Penn, Boone, and Sashi are zapped into a galaxy world, Rippen falls in love for a space villain named Lady Starblaster. Guest star: Sigourney Weaver as Lady Starblaster
12b	12b	"Amber"	Adam Henry	Paiman Kalayeh	Joseph S. Scott	June 8, 2015	112	0.46
Penn and his team return to the dino-cowboy world and get help from Sheriff Scaley Briggs to stop Rippen and Briggs' daughter Amber from rustling Cow-o-saurs. Guest stars: Beau Bridges as Sheriff Scaley Briggs, Olivia Holt as Amber Briggs
13a	13a	"Totally Into Your Body"	Chuckles Austen	Chad Drew	Brandon Warren	June 22, 2015	113	0.42
After Boone fools around on the zapping platform, he and Penn accidentally swap roles, so Boone takes on the role of hero for their mission. Boone and Sashi are a science crew who have been shrunken down to cure Penn, an infected patient, by injecting him with medicine from the inside. Meanwhile, Rippen and Larry are also inside Penn's body and are trying to stop the team from completing their mission. Guest star: Maria Bamford as Mrs. Monkenfluffer
13b	13b	"Fish and Chips"	Adam Henry	Jase Ricci	Joseph Scott	June 22, 2015	113	0.42
When Penn, Boone, and Sashi return to the underwater world, Penn questions the importance of their mission to find an unpopular royal fish named Rufus. Guest star: Peter Stormare as Rufus
14	14	"The Ripple Effect"	Chuckles Austen and Adam Henry	Story by : Jared Bush; Teleplay by : Jeff Poliquin	Stu Livingston and Wolf-Rüdiger Bloss	July 6, 2015	114	0.39
When Penn discovers that Phyllis is trying to locate the Most Dangerous World Imaginable to bring his parents back to Middleburg, he takes matters into his own hands and attempts to zap into the dimension to rescue them himself. Unfortunately, Penn accidentally zaps into the Least Dangerous World Imaginable, which leads to him to cause trouble in the world. Guest stars: Kate Micucci as Cute-ling General, Kumail Nanjiani as Cute-ling Mayor
15a	15a	"Where Dragons Dare"	Chuckles Austen	Shane Morris	Brandon Warren	July 20, 2015	115	0.47
When the team zaps into a world populated by anthropomorphic dragons, Penn must overcome his jealousy of popular fellow cadet Blaze to complete his mission and finish at the top of his class at Wingfire Academy. Guest stars: Sean Astin as Blaze, Kenny Loggins as Montage Singer
15b	15b	"Rip-Penn"	Tom De Rosier	Story by : Jeff Poliquin; Teleplay by : Jase Ricci	Heiko Drengenberg	July 20, 2015	115	0.47
While in a Victorian London world, Penn accidentally drinks a potion that turns him into a monster Rippen whenever he loses his temper in the style of Dr. Jekyll and Mr. Hyde with a mix Kamen Rider W.
16a	16a	"Chuckle City 500"	Tom De Rosier	Paiman Kalayeh	Kathleen Good	August 10, 2015	116	0.45
Penn, Sashi and Boone return to Chuckle City to compete in a clown-style street race that determines who will be the next Mayor. Guest stars: Jeff Gordon as Wacky Bustgutty, Garry Marshall as Soda Jerk
16b	16b	"Rock and Roll"	Tom De Rosier	Shane Morris	Joe Oh	August 10, 2015	116	0.45
Penn is excited to be a super spy agent, but when he finds out he's actually a caveman in a prehistoric era with the lowest tech gadgets imaginable, his sour attitude on the situation endangers the mission. Guest star: Maria Bamford as Nug
17a	17a	"Plantywood: City of Flora"	Chuckles Austen	Paiman Kalayeh	Stu Livingston	August 17, 2015	117	0.45
In a world populated by anthropomorphic plants, Private Detective Penn and her sidekick Sashi has to unravel a twisted mystery. Guest star: Rena Strober as Orchid
17b	17b	"Boone's Apprentice"	Adam Henry	Jase Ricci	Wolf-Rüdiger Bloss	August 17, 2015	117	0.45
The team is zapped into an animal barbarian and wizards world where Boone is tasked with conjuring up a magic spell to stop Rippen. Guest star: Blake Anderson as Hogarth
18a	18a	"The QPC"	Tom De Rosier	Jase Ricci and Paiman Kalayeh	Kathleen Good	September 28, 2015	118	0.63
Uncle Chuck and Aunt Rose must prove that they have a heroic side after they break the Quadrithium Power Converter (QPC), an essential part of the machine that zaps Penn back from other worlds, before their nephew is lost forever. Guest stars: Maria Bamford as Mrs. Monkenfluffer & Matthews, Maurice LaMarche as Fredricks, Fred Tatasciore as Coach Egsgard
18b	18b	"Shirley B. Awesome"	Chuckles Austen	Adam Stein	Brandon Warren	September 28, 2015	118	0.63
Penn, Boone, and Sashi are zapped into a backyard world where they are military action figures and Sashi meets her hero, General Shirley B. Awesome. Guest star: Wanda Sykes as Shirley B. Awesome
19a	19a	"Massive Morphy Merge Mechs"	Chuckles Austen	Sam Levine	Stu Livingston	September 29, 2015	120	0.63
Penn, Boone, Sashi, Rippen and Larry must figure out how to work together when they merge as giant metamorphosing robots, battling for control of an alien planet.
19b	19b	"Ultrahyperball"	Adam Henry	Thomas Middleditch	Wolf-Rüdiger Bloss	September 29, 2015	120	0.63
When the fate of two alien planets is tied to the outcome of a sporting event, Penn finds a loophole in the game and must convince the two opposing coaches to admit their love for each other in order to save both planets. Guest stars: Jason Alexander as Coach Wallace, Jane Kaczmarek as Coach Jackie, John Anderson as Announcer Mike, John Henson as Announcer Ron, Dee Bradley Baker as Referee
20	20	"Zap One"	Tom De Rosier and Adam Henry	Jared Bush	Joe Oh and Joseph S. Scott	September 30, 2015	119	0.43
Penn's origin story is revealed in a flashback to his first day of high school when he learns his parents are part-time heroes instead of insurance salespeople.
21	21	"Save the Worlds"	Tom De Rosier and Chuckles Austen	Jeff Poliquin	Kathleen Good, Brandon Warren, Wolf-Rüdiger Bloss and Stu Livingston	October 1, 2015	121	0.45
Phil and Rippen tunnel into The Odyssey and damage the Multi Universe Transprojector, causing unbalance in the multiverse. Vortexes form in every world that Penn and his team have visited. Penn, Boone, and Sashi must travel to each world and close all of the vortexes before everything and everyone from all the worlds get sucked into The Nothingness. During their mission, Penn finds a crystal shard in The Nothingness, which, according to Phyllis, is the key to finding his parents. Guest stars: Beau Bridges as Sheriff Scaley Briggs, Adam West as Captain Super Captain, Maria Bamford as Nug, Sean Astin as Blaze, Olivia Holt as Amber, Wanda Sykes as Shirley B. Awesome Song: "Save the Worlds" performed by Beau Black

=== Season 2 (2017) ===
Tycoon Animation and Top Draw Animation both provided the animation for this season replacing Mercury Filmworks.

No. overall	No. in season	Title	Directed by	Written by	Storyboard by	Original release date	Prod. code	US viewers (millions)
22	1	"The Pirates, the Parrot, the Puzzles and the Talking Boats"	Adam Henry and Tom De Rosier	Jeff Poliquin	Brandon Warren; Joseph S. Scott	July 10, 2017	121	0.19
After a recap of the events of the first season. Penn, Sashi, and Boone are sent to a pirate world where aquatic creatures serve as ships. Penn must get to a treasure before Rippen does, but finds himself teaming with a competitive female pirate in the process. Guest stars: Yvette Nicole Brown as Boat Maria, Sonequa Martin-Green as Pirate Maria
23a	2a	"Alpha, Bravo, Unicorn"	Kathleen Good	Paiman Kalayeh	Jean-Sebastien Duclos; Kataneh Vahdani	July 11, 2017	122	0.12
The trio return to the dragon world which finds itself under attack by winged unicorns which threaten to destroy Wingfire Academy. However before the team can fight them, they must get Blaze, who has fallen into a slump from a previous defeat by the unicorns, back on his feet to help them. Guest stars: Sean Astin as Blaze, Maurice LaMarche as Unicorn soldiers, Tress MacNeille as General Talon, Yael Stone as General Bighorn
23b	2b	"A Game of Cat and Mouse"	Adam Henry	Adam Henry	Shane Zalvin	July 11, 2017	123	0.12
The trio is transported onto a space ship whose human occupants are set to arrive on a new planet to colonize. However, Penn finds himself in the form of a mouse and must save the ship from a feline Rippen who seeks to plunge it into a black hole. Guest stars: Dee Bradley Baker as Animal voices, Bill Nye as himself
24a	3a	"Wings of Destiny"	Adam Henry	Jeff Poliquin	Brandon Warren	July 12, 2017	124	0.16
The trio find themselves in a fairy world in the midst of a wrestling tournament which Penn and Sashi must win to keep the forest out of evil hands. However, things are complicated by an argument between the two, forcing Boone to try to get them to mend their friendship. Guest star: John DiMaggio as Hooded Pixie
24b	3b	"Sensitivity Training"	Tom De Rosier	Jase Ricci	Brandon Warren	July 12, 2017	125	0.16
Sashi is called in for sensitivity training which Principal Larry forces Penn and Boone to attend as well. The methods seem to work to quell her anger, but soon become a hindrance when the trio return to the underwater world for a mission. Guest stars: Maria Bamford as Land Shark, Peter Stormare as Rufus
25a	4a	"The Bewildering Bout of the Astounding Automatons"	Tom De Rosier and Adam Henry	Kenny Byerly	Travis Blaise	July 13, 2017	126	N/A
Boone and Larry are steampunk inventors and one of them has to win the boxing automaton match. Guest star: Paul Alborough as Mayor Direginald Hindenburg
25b	4b	"Back to the Past of Future Balls"	Kathleen Good	Jeff Poliquin	Naomi Hicks	July 13, 2017	127	N/A
Team Zero return to the Ball World to save its past from Rippen. Guest stars: Jeff Bennett as Eight Ball, Kari Wahlgren as Bowling Ball, Curtis Armstrong as Super Amazing Bouncy Ball
26a	5a	"A Tale of Two Wizards"	Adam Henry	Paiman Kalayeh	Shane Zalvin	July 17, 2017	128	0.11
A return to the Knight World causes issues for Boone when he meets a better wizard than himself. Guest stars: Pete Holmes as Ryan, Maurice LaMarche as troll
26b	5b	"Rockullan, Papyron, Scissorian"	Adam Henry	Kenny Byerly	Joseph S. Scott	July 17, 2017	129	0.11
In a world that is a Rock, Paper and Scissor version of Game of Thrones, Penn's team face a siege by the Scissorian army. Guest stars: JB Blanc as captain of the Guard, Michelle Fairley as Queen Igneous, Jenny Veal as Princess Magma
27a	6a	"Be My Ghost"	Tom De Rosier	Story by : Jase Ricci; Teleplay by : Paiman Kalayeh	Joe Oh	July 18, 2017	130	N/A
Penn's team has to save a ghost from supernatural exterminators Rippen and Larry. Guest stars: Jeff Ross as Sonny, Rena Strober as hotel reviewer
27b	6b	"The Chinchilla"	Adam Henry	Kenny Byerly	Joseph S. Scott	July 18, 2017	131	N/A
Penn has to take care of The Chinchilla -- which causes problem on their return to the Plush Toy World. Guest stars: Kevin Michael Richardson as Dr. Hissy, Diana Rigg as Mayor Pink Panda
28a	7a	"The Kobayashis"	Adam Henry and Kathleen Good	Jase Ricci	Kathleen Good	July 19, 2017	132	0.13
When Sashi's parents find out about her real job with Penn and Boone, Penn has Phyllis zap her and her parents into the Outer Space World.
28b	7b	"Cereal Fugitives"	Tom De Rosier	Paiman Kalayeh	Brandon Warren	July 19, 2017	133	0.13
A mission in Cereal Mascot World gets weird when the Milkman makes an appearance. Guest stars: Paul Reubens as the Milkman, Jeffrey Perlmutter as Uncle Beardy, Maurice LaMarche as Crispity Cockatoo
29	8	"The Last Mountain Beast"	Tom De Rosier and Kathleen Good	Jeff Poliquin	Travis Blaise; Hillary Bradfield	July 20, 2017	134	N/A
Penn, Boone, and Sashi must find the last mountain beast to protect their civilization from getting destroyed by Rippen and Larry before the 5th moon rises. However, Penn's MUHU tracks a shard in the dimension, distracting Penn from the mission. Guest star: Kevin Michael Richardson as Mountain Beast
30a	9a	"Ninki Ninja Fight Town"	Tom De Rosier	Kenny Byerly	Casey Coffey	July 24, 2017	135	0.15
Penn, Boone, and Sashi visit an Anime World to compete against Rippen in a ninjutsu tournament to bring back an island back with the help of 3 new friends. Guest stars: Hynden Walch as Yumi, Sparklechum and Mugachow, Michael Chandler as Arata, Roger Craig Smith as Hideo, Steven Blum as Snow Monkey Bus and Announcer, and Brandon Scott as Alex
30b	9b	"My Mischievous Son"	Kathleen Good	Paiman Kalayeh	Stu Livingston	July 24, 2017	136	0.15
Penn has to stop Rippen from ruining a dinner in a sitcom dimension. Guest stars: Judith Light as Mrs. Wright, Reginald VelJohnson as Mr. Flannigan
31a	10a	"That Purple Guy"	Kathleen Good	Michelle Spitz	Hillary Bradfield	July 25, 2017	137	0.16
Penn, Sashi, and Boone travel to Alien World to make the Princess Argelbleccht and Grinkon fall in love. Guest stars: Elizabeth Henstridge as Princess Argelbleccht Blunkenthorthph, Fred Tatasciore as Grinkon, Brad Kane as "Handsome" Grinkon
31b	10b	"Rootilda"	Adam Henry	Kamon Naddaf	Joseph S. Scott	July 25, 2017	138	0.16
Boone is kidnapped and Penn and Sashi must solve the mystery and find him. Guest stars: Neil Kaplan as Club Owner, Vartan Nazarian as Fern, Rena Strober as Orchid & Rootilda
32a	11a	"The Most Dangerous World Imaginable"	Kathleen Good	Kenny Byerly	Jean-Sebastien Duclos	July 26, 2017	139	0.16
Vonnie must rescue Brock from the belly of a giant chicken. Guest stars: Cree Summer as The Merchant, Marc Maron as Piv
32b	11b	"Trading Faces"	Tom De Rosier	Paiman Kalayeh	Brandon Warren	July 26, 2017	140	0.16
Penn, Boone and Sashi must stop Rippen from ruining Middleburg High when he switches bodies with Larry. Guest stars: Lauren Lapkus as Matilda, Fred Tatasciore as Mr. Egsgard, Jess Harnell as Old Man Middleberg, Dee Bradley Baker as Tony the Elephant, Brandon Scott as Alex, Maria Bamford as Mrs. Monkenfluffer
33a	12a	"13 Big Problems"	Adam Henry	Jared Bush	Shane Zalvin	July 27, 2017	141	0.12
Boone gets a bad report card from Phyllis, making his parents mad. He tries to fix this while on a mission in the Giant Monster World. Guest star: Maria Bamford as President
33b	12b	"Mr. Rippen"	Tom De Rosier and Adam Henry	Kenny Byerly and Paiman Kalayeh	Casey Coffey	July 27, 2017	142	0.12
Rippen's origin story is revealed for his first day as a part-time villain. Guest stars: Fiona Shaw as Hedwin, Vince Gilligan as Axalon, Alex Kingston as Vlurgen, Yvette Nicole Brown as Boat Maria, Sonequa Martin-Green as Pirate Maria
34	13	"At the End of the Worlds"	Kathleen Good, Adam Henry, and Tom De Rosier	Sam Levine and Jeff Poliquin	Jean-Sebastien Duclos; Shane Zalvin; Travis Blaise; Hillary Bradfield	July 28, 2017	143 and 144	0.17
35	14	"At the End of the Worlds"	Kathleen Good, Adam Henry, and Tom De Rosier	Sam Levine and Jeff Poliquin	Jean-Sebastien Duclos; Shane Zalvin; Travis Blaise; Hillary Bradfield	July 28, 2017	143 and 144	0.17
Penn, Sashi, and Boone must travel to the three most dangerous places in the multiverse in order to free Penn's parents as Rippen plans to conquer the Most Dangerous World Imaginable with Larry and those with him after having to close its portal from the other side. Note: One hour series finale. Guest stars: Blake Anderson as Hogarth, Sean Astin as Blaze, Maria Bamford as President, Nug, Land Shark, & Mrs. Monkenfluffer, Beau Bridges as Scaley Briggs, Paul Alborough as Mayor Direginald Hindenburg, Curtis Armstrong as Super Amazing Bouncy Ball, Yvette Nicole Brown as Boat Maria, Olivia Holt as Amber Briggs, Michael-Leon Wooley as General, James Hong as Windmill Monster, Mark Hamill as Adam Tom-Kat Badawy, Elizabeth Henstridge as Princess, Lauren Lapkus as Matilda, Marc Maron as Piv, Sonequa Martin-Green as Pirate Maria, Diana Rigg as Mayor Pink Panda, Paul Reubens as The Butterman, Jeff Ross as Sonny, Adam West as Captain Super Captain & Professor Evil Professor, Henry Winkler as The Snowman
