= Derek Savage =

Derek Savage may refer to:

- Derek Savage (filmmaker), director of Cool Cat Saves the Kids
- Derek Savage (Christian anarchist) (1917–2007), pacifist poet and critic
- Derek Savage (Gaelic footballer) (born 1978), former inter-county Gaelic football player for Galway
