= This Just In =

This Just In is a phrase used by news anchors when an important piece of news has just arrived while on the air. It may also refer to:

- This Just In: What I Couldn't Tell You on TV, a 2003 book written by Bob Schieffer
- This Just In!, a 2004 American animated television series for the Spike network
- This Just In, the working title of a 2007 television news satire show on Fox News Channel actually aired as The Half Hour News Hour
- This Just In (2016 TV series), an American comedy television series for the Pop network
- This Just In with Max Kellerman, a former ESPN sports talk show
