= Elizabeth Stanton's Great Big World =

- Directed by: Laura McKenzie
- Presented by: Elizabeth Stanton
- Country of origin: United States
- Original language: English
- No. of seasons: 9
- No. of episodes: 176

Production
- Executive producer: Laura McKenzie
- Running time: Approx. 30 minutes
- Production company: Associated Television International

Original release
- Network: Syndication
- Release: September 15, 2011 – present

Elizabeth Stanton's Great Big World is an American educational television series produced by Associated Television International in which Elizabeth Stanton goes on a tour to places around the world.

== Episodes ==
=== Season One (2011–2012) ===
1. "African Safari" – September 15, 2011
2. "Vietnam Is Listening" – September 22, 2011
3. "Schools of Nicaragua" – September 29, 2011
4. "The Spirit of Mississippi" – October 6, 2011
5. "Caribbean Wildlife" – October 13, 2011
6. "Caribbean Conservation" – November 3, 2011
7. "Dolphin Adventure" – November 10, 2011
8. "Florida Wildlife" – November 17, 2011
9. "Miami Culture" – November 24, 2011
10. "Eco Catalina" – December 8, 2011
11. "Zoology 101" – December 15, 2011
12. "Hogwarts, Sky Coasting, and Alligators" – January 19, 2012
13. "Daytime Gives Back" – February 2, 2012
14. "London Calling" – February 9, 2012
15. "The Wild, Wild West" – February 16, 2012
16. "Elizabeth Loves L.A." – February 23, 2012
17. "Arizona Desert Adventures" – March 11, 2012
18. "American Southwest" – March 18, 2012
19. "Great Adventures" – April 29, 2012
20. "On the Wild Side" – May 6, 2012
21. "Giving Back" – May 13, 2012
22. "Amazing Attractions" – May 20, 2012

=== Season Two (2012–2013) ===
1. "Colorado Springs" – September 9, 2012
2. "San Antonio" – September 16, 2012
3. "Key West" – September 23, 2012
4. "Denver" – September 30, 2012
5. "The Amazing Los Angeles Race, Part 1" – October 7, 2012
6. "The Florida Keys" – October 28, 2012
7. "Madrid" – November 4, 2012
8. "The Amazing Los Angeles Race, Part 2" – November 11, 2012
9. "Lisbon" – November 18, 2012
10. "Barcelona" – November 25, 2012
11. "Elizabeth's Sweet Sixteen" – December 9, 2012
12. "The Hollywood Christmas Parade" – January 27, 2013
13. "High-Flying L.A. Adventures" – February 3, 2013
14. "Go Wild in the Sunshine State" – February 10, 2013
15. "Science, Shuttles and Outerspace" – February 17, 2013
16. "The Old West" – February 24, 2013
17. "Aerial and Magical Arts" – March 31, 2013
18. "Discover L.A." – April 7, 2013
19. "Iberian Excursions" – April 28, 2013
20. "Island Adventures" – May 5, 2013
21. "Taste of the World" – May 12, 2013
22. "Celebrity Dance-a-thon" – June 2, 2013

=== Season Three (2013–2014) ===
1. "Great Exumas Adventures, Part 1" – September 8, 2013
2. "Great Exumas Adventures, Part 2" – September 15, 2013
3. "Nassau" – September 22, 2013
4. "Europe" – September 29, 2013
5. "Harbour Island" – October 20, 2013
6. "Adventure in the Bahamas" – October 27, 2013
7. "Magic and Illusion" – November 3, 2013
8. "Giving Back" – November 10, 2013
9. "Adrenaline Adventures" – November 17, 2013
10. "Hollywood Legends" – February 2, 2014
11. "Medieval Adventure" – February 9, 2014
12. "High Flying Adventures" – February 16, 2014
13. "Lights, Camera, Action!" – February 23, 2014
14. "Amazing Wildlife" – March 9, 2014
15. "Life Below the Surface" – March 16, 2014
16. "Epic Castles and Palaces" – March 23, 2014
17. "Fab 4 Showdown" – April 13, 2014
18. "Historic Cities" – April 20, 2014
19. "Going the Nautical Mile" – April 27, 2014
20. "Masquerade Ball, Part 1" – June 15, 2014
21. "Masquerade Ball, Part 2" – June 22, 2014
22. "Unusual City Tours" – June 29, 2014

=== Season Four (2014–2015) ===
1. "Nevada Adventures" – September 7, 2014
2. "Cowboy for a Day" – September 14, 2014
3. "Palm Springs" – September 21, 2014
4. "Desert Adventures" – September 28, 2014
5. "Park City" – October 26, 2014
6. "Olympic Games" – November 2, 2014
7. "Life in a Blue Lagoon" – November 9, 2014
8. "Modern Day Renaissance" – November 16, 2014
9. "Eye on London" – December 7, 2014
10. "Bavarian Adventures" – December 21, 2014
11. "Exploring Munich" – February 1, 2015
12. "German Festivals" – February 8, 2015
13. "Equestrian Adventures" – February 15, 2015
14. "Hip Hop Dance" – March 29, 2015

=== Season Five (2015–2016) ===
1. "Prehistoric Hollywood" – September 6, 2015
2. "Bahamas Adventures" – September 13, 2015
3. "Life on Horseback" – September 20, 2015
4. "Behind the Scenes" – September 27, 2015
5. "Favorite Foods" – November 1, 2015
6. "Venice" – November 8, 2015
7. "Venice Carnival" – November 15, 2015
8. "Slovenia" – November 22, 2015
9. "Vienna" – January 10, 2016
10. "Innsbruck" – January 17, 2016
11. "Central Europe" – February 7, 2016
12. "Southern California" – February 14, 2016
13. "Room Escape Adventures" – February 21, 2016
14. "Frankfurt" – May 8, 2016
15. "Berlin" – May 15, 2016
16. "Tropical Adventures" – May 29, 2016
17. "Greece" – June 5, 2016
18. "Armenia" – June 12, 2016
19. "Yerevan" – June 26, 2016
20. "Croatia" – July 3, 2016

=== Season Six (2016–2019) ===
1. "The Culture of Armenia" – October 30, 2016
2. "Dubai" – November 6, 2016
3. "Moscow" – November 13, 2016
4. "The Rivieras of France and Italy" – November 20, 2016
5. "Montenegro" – January 29, 2017
6. "St. Petersburg" – February 5, 2017
7. "Winter Sports" – February 26, 2017
8. "Ancient Cities" – March 19, 2017
9. "High Seas Adventures" – April 9, 2017
10. "Hands On Discoveries" – April 30, 2017
11. "Fantastic Festivals" – November 26, 2017
12. "Palaces and Palazzos" – December 3, 2017
13. "Volunteering in Armenia" – December 10, 2017
14. "Adriatic Adventures" – January 4, 2018
15. "Jaipur" – January 28, 2018
16. "Abu Dhabi" – February 25, 2018
17. "Delhi" – March 25, 2018
18. "Armenian Adventures" – April 15, 2018
19. "Copenhagen" – May 6, 2018
20. "Mumbai" – May 13, 2018
21. "French Riviera" – June 10, 2018
22. "Best of Agra and India" – July 1, 2018
23. "Stockholm" – July 26, 2018
24. "Washington D.C. & Virginia" – August 30, 2018
25. "Jerusalem" – November 29, 2018
26. "Best of Morocco" – January 10, 2019

=== Season Seven (2019–2020) ===
1. "Tuscany" – October 14, 2019
2. "Marrakesh" – November 8, 2019
3. "Israel" – November 25, 2019
4. "Florence" – January 27, 2020
5. "Italy and the Mediterranean" – February 17, 2020
6. "Amman and the Dead Sea" – February 24, 2020
7. "Petra & Wadi Rum" – March 30, 2020
8. "Ancient Jordan" – April 20, 2020

=== Season Eight (2021–2022) ===
1. "German Adventures" – September 6, 2021
2. "Exotic Journeys" – September 13, 2021
3. "Flavors of Europe" – September 20, 2021
4. "Middle Eastern Adventures" – September 27, 2021
5. "Nordic Expedition" – December 6, 2021
6. "Hidden European Games" – December 13, 2021
7. "Camel Ride Adventures" – February 28, 2022
8. "Amazing Animals" – March 7, 2022
9. "Historical Adventures" – March 14, 2022
10. "Great Capitals" – March 21, 2022
11. "European Capital Cities" – March 28, 2022
12. "Jewels of the Desert" – April 4, 2022
13. "Classic Italy" – April 11, 2022
14. "Italy on the Water" – September 5, 2022
15. "Great Destinations" – September 12, 2022
16. "Modern and Ancient" – September 19, 2022
17. "Classic Capitals" – September 26, 2022
18. "Tuscany Adventures" – November 25, 2022
19. "Water and Snow" – December 2, 2022
20. "Water and Sun" – December 5, 2022
21. "Scandinavian Capitals" – December 12, 2022

=== Season Nine (2024–2025) ===
1. "Forever Italy" – September 9, 2024
2. "Secret European Gems" – September 16, 2024
3. "Seasons of Armenia" – September 23, 2024
4. "America Through Time" – September 30, 2024
5. "Wild World" – November 4, 2024
6. "New Skills" – November 11, 2024
7. "More Italy on the Water" – December 9, 2024
8. "Indian Adventures" – January 13, 2025
9. "Fun in Scandinavia" – February 24, 2025
10. "Mediterranean Adventures" – March 3, 2025
11. "Charming European Cities" – March 10, 2025
12. "Exploring Europe on the Water" – March 17, 2025
13. "American Adventures" – March 24, 2025
14. "Dressing the Part" – April 14, 2025
15. "Highlights from Germany" – April 21, 2025
16. "Old and New Hollywood" – April 28, 2025
17. "Best European Activities" – May 5, 2025
18. "Island Hopping" – May 12, 2025
19. "Tasting American Foods" – May 19, 2025
20. "Olympic Winter Vacations" – May 26, 2025
21. "Incredible Day Tips" – June 2, 2025
