= Cash Cowboys (2017 TV series) =

American reality show

Cash Cowboys is a reality show that premiered on Saturday, November 4 on Pop, produced by Associated Television International.

The show features the Huwas, a Colorado-based family of farmers, cowboys, and entrepreneurs. The family manages various businesses, including a land reclamation company that reclaims land destroyed by natural disasters. With a heritage of farming, the Huwas have developed skills for reclaiming and preserving land.
