= This Just In (2016 TV series) =

- Genre: Sitcom
- Starring: Elizabeth Stanton; Kristos Andrews; Rob Pinkston; Wyntergrace Williams; Jesse LeBeau; Ashlee Macropoulos; Brett Pierce; Sheridan Pierce; Jennifer Veal; Donn Stewart
- Theme music composer: John Ross
- Composer: John Ross
- Country of origin: United States
- Original language: English
- No. of seasons: 1
- No. of episodes: 22

Production
- Executive producer: Laura McKenzie
- Running time: 30 minutes
- Production company: LANY Entertainment

Original release
- Network: Pop
- Release: December 10, 2016 – November 24, 2017

This Just In is an American teen sitcom that aired on Pop from December 10, 2016, to November 24, 2017.

== Plot summary ==
Elizabeth Stanton plays the role of a socially repressed teenager who starts at a new school and quickly befriends a group of eccentric peers, each dealing with their own unique challenges. They discover a unique bond centered around the school’s television and social media channels.

== Cast ==
- Elizabeth Stanton as Liz Sandler
- Kristos Andrews as Tyler
- Rob Pinkston as Rob
- Wyntergrace Williams as Becca
- Jesse LeBeau as Joe
- Ashlee Macropoulos as Cassie
- Brett Pierce as Rex
- Sheridan Pierce as Martha
- Jennifer Veal as Abby
- Donn Stewart as Banana Boy

== Episodes ==
No.	Title	Directed by	Written by	Original release date
1	"The New Girl at School"	Gregori J. Martin	Rob Pinkston and Mae Catt	December 10, 2016
2	"A This Just In Christmas, Part 1"	Gregori J. Martin	Rob Pinkston and Mae Catt	December 17, 2016
3	"A This Just In Christmas, Part 2"	Gregori J. Martin	Rob Pinkston and Mae Catt	December 17, 2016
4	"Read All About It"	Gregori J. Martin	Rob Pinkston and Mae Catt	December 24, 2016
5	"The Sunnybrook High Talent Show"	Gregori J. Martin	Rob Pinkston and Mae Catt	December 31, 2016
6	"The Rebeccas of Sunnybrook High"	Gregori J. Martin	Rob Pinkston and Mae Catt	January 7, 2017
7	"No Good Deed Goes Unpunished"	Gregori J. Martin	Rob Pinkston and Mae Catt	January 14, 2017
8	"Relationships"	Gregori J. Martin	Rob Pinkston and Mae Catt	January 21, 2017
9	"Mascots and Detention"	Chris Merrill	Blake Knight	January 28, 2017
10	"School Election Day"	Brad Thomas	Laura McKenzie and Gregori J. Martin	February 4, 2017
11	"Valentine's Day"	Gregori J. Martin	Rob Pinkston	February 11, 2017
12	"House Party"	Gregori J. Martin	Rob Pinkston	February 18, 2017
13	"The Sleepover"	Brad Thomas	Rob Pinkston	February 25, 2017
14	"Liz's Top Ten"	Gregori J. Martin	Rob Pinkston	March 4, 2017
15	"Seven Grumpy Kids"	Brad Thomas	Story by : Rob Pinkston; Teleplay by : Aurthur Digger and Quenten Eli	March 11, 2017
16	"Career Exploration Day"	Brad Thomas	Blake Knight and Gregori J. Martin	March 18, 2017
17	"The Math Tutor"	Brad Thomas	Blake Knight	April 1, 2017
18	"Fundraising"	Brad Thomas	Blake Knight	April 15, 2017
19	"A This Just In Halloween, Part 1"	Gregori J. Martin	Rob Pinkston	October 27, 2017
20	"A This Just In Halloween, Part 2"	Gregori J. Martin	Rob Pinkston	October 27, 2017
21	"A This Just In Thanksgiving, Part 1"	Brad Thomas	Blake Knight	November 17, 2017
22	"A This Just In Thanksgiving, Part 2"	Gregori J. Martin	Gregori J. Martin	November 24, 2017

== Reception ==
=== U.S. ratings ===
No.	Episode	Air date	Time slot (EST)	Rating/share (18–49)	Viewers (m)
1	"The New Girl at School"	December 10, 2016	Saturday; 10:30 a.m.	TBA	TBA
2	"A This Just In Christmas, Part 1"	December 17, 2016	Saturday; 10:00 a.m.	TBA	TBA
3	"A This Just In Christmas, Part 2"	December 17, 2016	Saturday; 10:30 a.m.	TBA	TBA
4	"Read All About It"	December 24, 2016	Saturday; 10:30 a.m.	TBA	TBA
5	"The Sunnybrook High Talent Show"	December 31, 2016	Saturday; 10:30 a.m.	TBA	TBA
6	"The Rebeccas of Sunnybrook High"	January 7, 2017	Saturday; 10:30 a.m.	TBA	TBA
7	"No Good Deed Goes Unpunished"	January 14, 2017	Saturday; 10:30 a.m.	TBA	TBA
8	"Relationships"	January 21, 2017	Saturday; 10:30 a.m.	TBA	TBA
9	"Mascots and Detention"	January 28, 2017	Saturday; 10:30 a.m.	TBA	TBA
10	"School Election Day"	February 4, 2017	Saturday; 10:30 a.m.	TBA	TBA
11	"Valentine's Day"	February 11, 2017	Saturday; 10:30 a.m.	TBA	TBA
12	"House Party"	February 18, 2017	Saturday; 10:30 a.m.	TBA	TBA
13	"The Sleepover"	February 25, 2017	Saturday; 10:30 a.m.	TBA	TBA
14	"Liz's Top Ten"	March 4, 2017	Saturday; 10:30 a.m.	TBA	TBA
15	"Seven Grumpy Kids"	March 11, 2017	Saturday; 10:30 a.m.	TBA	TBA
16	"Career Exploration Day"	March 18, 2017	Saturday; 10:30 a.m.	TBA	TBA
17	"The Math Tutor"	April 1, 2017	Saturday; 11:00 a.m.	TBA	TBA
18	"Fundraising"	April 15, 2017	Saturday; 11:00 a.m.	TBA	TBA
19	"A This Just In Halloween, Part 1"	October 27, 2017	Friday; 8:00 a.m.	TBA	TBA
20	"A This Just In Halloween, Part 2"	October 27, 2017	Friday; 8:30 a.m.	TBA	TBA
21	"A This Just In Thanksgiving, Part 1"	November 17, 2017	Friday; 8:30 a.m.	TBA	TBA
22	"A This Just In Thanksgiving, Part 2"	November 24, 2017	Friday; 8:30 a.m.	TBA	TBA
