= Elizabeth Stanton (television host) =

American television host (born 1995)

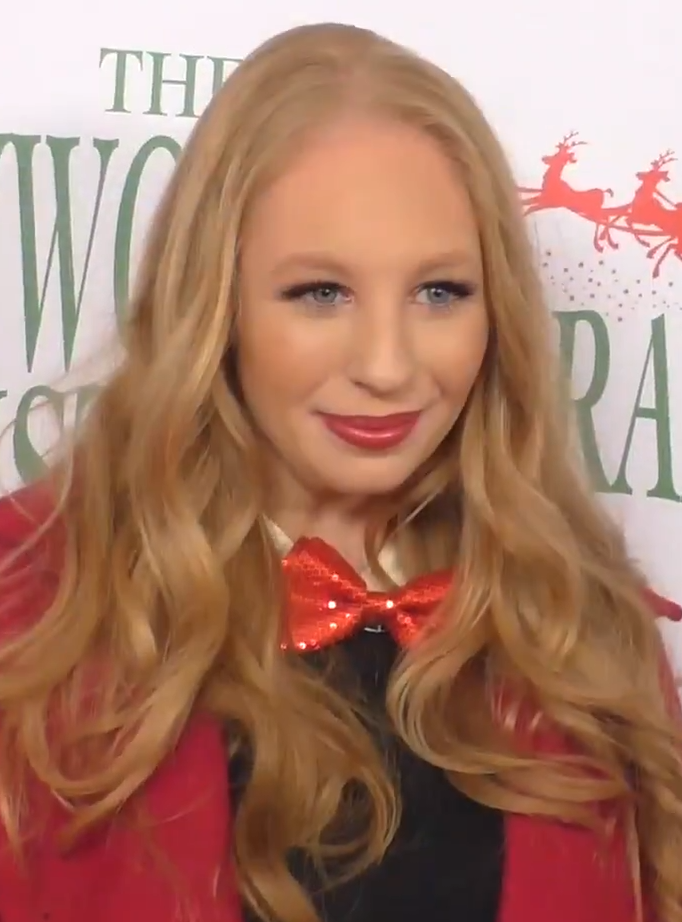
- Stanton in 2016
- Born: December 18, 1995 (age 30); Los Angeles, California, U.S.
- Occupations: Television presenter, actress

Elizabeth Stanton (born December 18, 1995) is an American television presenter and actress. She hosts her own syndicated E/I television series Elizabeth Stanton's Great Big World, and is also the host of World's Funniest Animals on The CW. As an actress, she portrayed the role of Liz Sandler on the teen sitcom This Just In.

== Filmography ==
Television
Year	Title	Notes
2010	The World's Funniest Moments	Correspondent
2011–2021	Elizabeth Stanton's Great Big World	Host
2016–2017	This Just In	Liz Sandler
2018	The Agency	Melissa
2019	The Big Stage	Host; Talent show airing on The CW
2020–2024	World's Funniest Animals	Presenter
