= Alien Seed =

1989 film by Bob James

- Directed by: Bob James
- Written by: Douglas K. Grimm; Robert Hyatt; Bob James
- Produced by: Jon Gordon
- Starring: Erik Estrada
- Cinematography: Kenny Carmack
- Music by: John Standish
- Distributed by: Action International Pictures
- Release date: 1989
- Language: English

Alien Seed is a 1989 American science fiction film written and directed by Bob James and starring Erik Estrada. It was released by Action International Pictures

== Plot ==
An Earth woman, Mary Jordan, is abducted by an alien presence on Earth . Unable to remember what happened, and with a strange mark on her neck, she contacts writer Mark Timmons, a self proclaimed expert on alien abductions, but she is killed by Dr Stone before they meet

The dead woman's sister, Lisa, is then abducted and impregnated by the aliens, as part of the alien's scheme to create a "Messiah" to rule Earth. She calls the writer in an attempt to stop the alien's plan MJ-12, a secret government agency studying UFOs, wants to kidnap Mary and control the child for its own purposes. Dr. Stone (Erik Estrada), however, wants the child dead at any cost.

== Cast ==
- Erik Estrada as Dr. Stone
- Heidi Paine as Lisa Jordan
- Steven Blade as Mark Timmons
- Shellie Block as Mary Jordan
- David Hayes as Rev. Bolam
- Terry Phillips as Gen. Dole
- Steve Gellman as Maj. Wilson
- Ben Mardel as Dr. Gabriel

== Reception ==
In Creature Feature, John Stanley gave the film two out of five stars opining that it does not rise above its direct to video origins. The Video Vacuum praised Estrada's acting, but stated the film lagged when he was not on screen. Den of Geek praised the trailer for the film as "one of the finest trailers I've seen". The Psychotronic Video Guide gave the film a poor review finding it to have a bad script, poor special effects, and too many chase scenes.

== Home Release ==
Released on DVD in 1999 Available to stream
