= Erik Estrada =

American actor (born 1949)

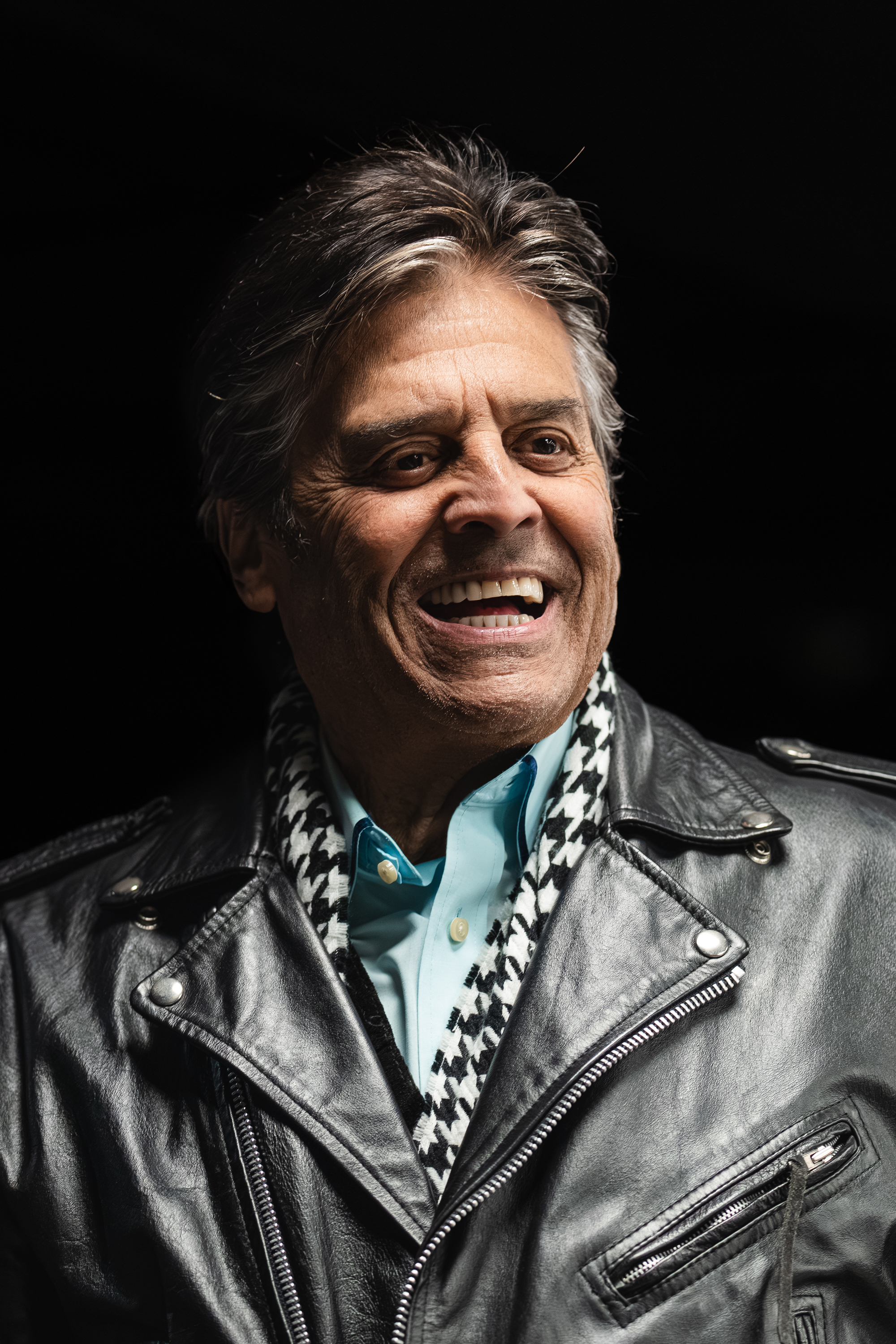
- Estrada at Big Lick Comic Con in Roanoke, Virginia in 2026
- Born: Henry Enrique Estrada; March 16, 1949 (age 77); New York City, U.S.
- Occupation: Actor
- Years active: 1970–present
- Spouses: Joyce Miller (m. 1979; div. 1980) Peggy Rowe (m. 1985; div. 1990) Nanette Mirkovich (m. 1997)
- Children: 3
- Website: erikestrada.com

Henry Enrique Estrada (born March 16, 1949) is an American actor, and former police officer. He is widely known for his co-starring lead role as California Highway Patrol officer Francis (Frank) Llewelyn "Ponch" Poncherello in the police drama television series CHiPs, which aired from 1977 to 1983. He later became known for his work in Spanish telenovelas, his appearances in reality television shows and infomercials, and as a regular voice on the series Sealab 2021, on Adult Swim.

== Early life ==
Estrada was born on March 16, 1949, in East Harlem, an area of Manhattan, New York to Carmen Moreno, a seamstress, and Renildo Estrada. He is of Puerto Rican descent. Growing up in the Amsterdam Houses in Lincoln Square, Manhattan, he thought about becoming a police officer, turning to acting after joining the drama club at Louis D. Brandeis High School on Manhattan's Upper East Side.

== Career ==
=== Acting ===
In 1970, Estrada made his film debut in the role of Nicky Cruz alongside Pat Boone, in the independent film The Cross and the Switchblade. In 1972, Estrada appeared in a small role as a police officer in The New Centurions, followed by a significant role in a major motion picture, the disaster film, Airport 1975, directed by Jack Smight, where he played Julio, a womanizing flight engineer on a Boeing 747. In 1975, he again worked with Smight in Midway, a successful military historical epic, as a fictional airman Ensign "Chili Bean" Ramos.

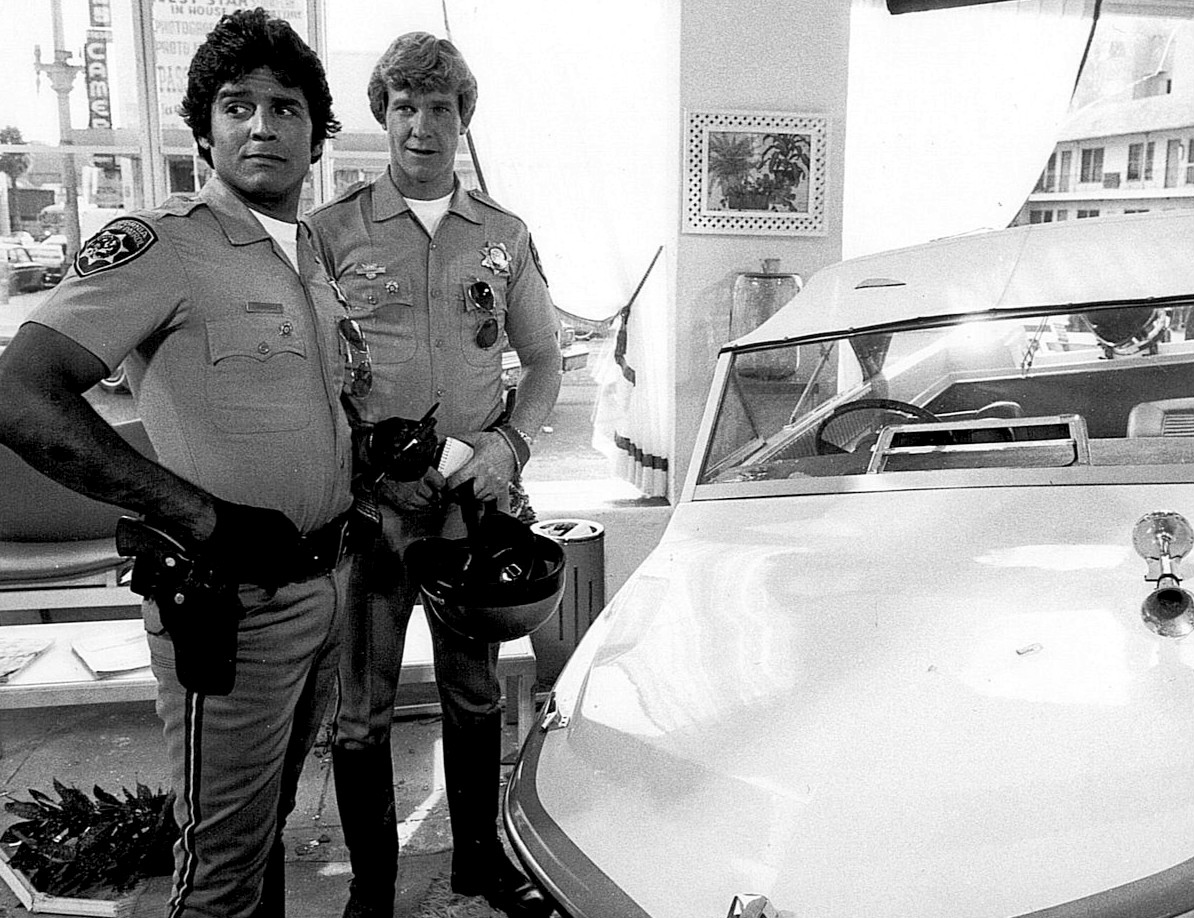
Estrada and Larry Wilcox on CHiPs in 1977

Beginning in 1977, Estrada co-starred as Frank "Ponch" Poncharello in CHiPs, a television series. In 1978, he began training in martial arts with SeishinDo Kenpo instructor Frank Argelander (Frank Landers), preparing for a two-part episode of CHiPs. The two appeared on the cover of Fighting Stars Magazine, also in 1978 talking about Estrada's training regimen. On August 6, 1979, Estrada was seriously injured while filming a scene on the set of CHiPs, fracturing several ribs and breaking both wrists after he was thrown from his 600-pound (270 kg) motorcycle.

Later in 1979, Estrada was voted one of "The 10 Sexiest Bachelors in the World" by People and was featured on the cover of the November issue. After a salary dispute with NBC in the fall of 1981, Estrada was briefly replaced by Olympic gold medalist and actor Bruce Jenner. Larry Wilcox, a co-star, left the series in 1982 amid behind-the-scenes friction. Estrada carried the remaining season of CHiPs without most of the supporting cast from the previous four seasons (who were fired due to budget costs). The show was eventually canceled in 1983. In the 1980s, he appeared in a string of low-budget films. He made a return to series television in a 1987 three-part episode of the police drama Hunter.

In the 1990s, Estrada played the role of Johnny, a Tijuana trucker, in a telenovela Dos mujeres, un camino ("Two women, one path"), on Televisa. He shared the main credits with Mexican actresses/singers Laura Leon and Bibi Gaytán. Originally slated for 100 episodes, the show had 200-plus episodes and became the biggest telenovela in Latin American history. He was reportedly paid one million pesos for the role.

In 1994, Estrada began co-hosting the syndicated outdoor adventure show American Adventurer, which ran until 2004. In 1995, he made a special guest appearance as Ponch in punk rock band Bad Religion's music video, "Infected", as well as in the video for Butthole Surfers's video for "Pepper". He has been seen on a few episodes of Sabrina the Teenage Witch as himself, seen in a daydream cloud in Hilda's mind and also when Hilda zapped herself in his car while he drives it.

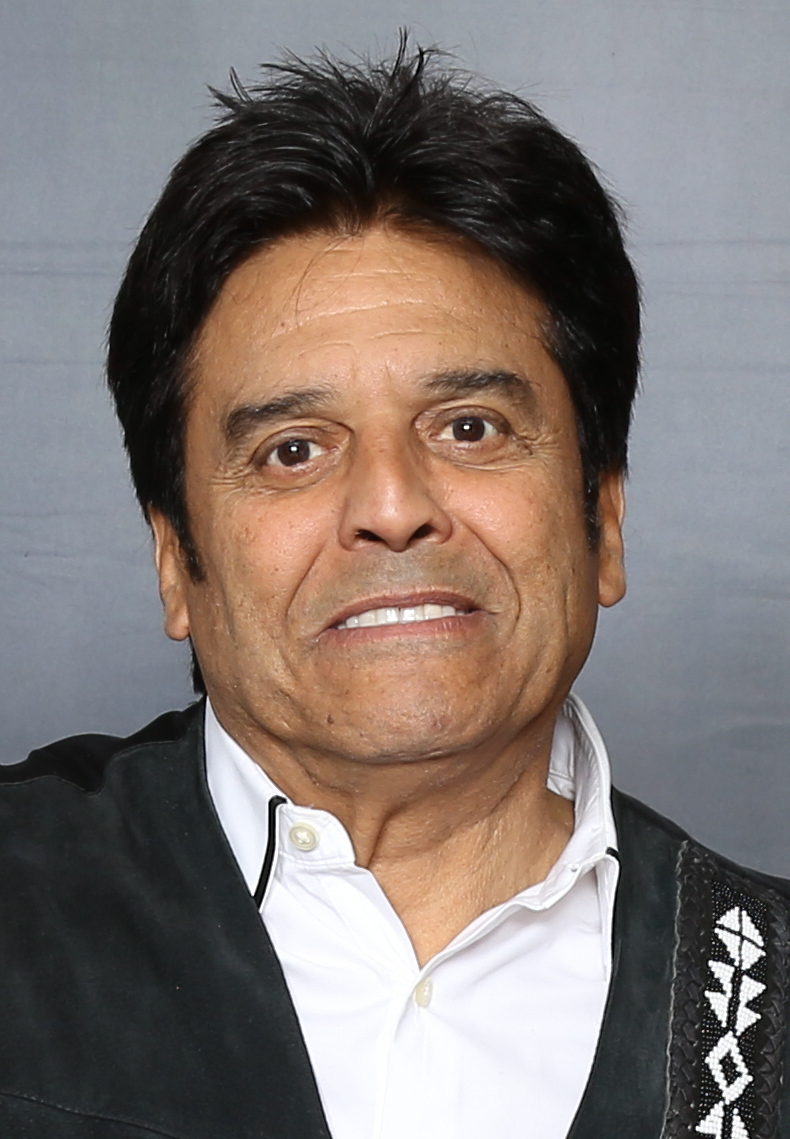
Estrada at the 2018 Paradise City Comic Con in Miami

In 1997, Estrada wrote his autobiography, Erik Estrada: My Road from Harlem to Hollywood. In 1998, he returned as the character Francis "Ponch" Poncherello in the TNT made-for-TV movie CHiPs '99, along with the rest of the original cast. In 2001, Estrada landed a role on the daytime drama The Bold and the Beautiful as Eduardo Dominguez. In 2002, he played a game-show host on the Disney Channel series Lizzie McGuire with Hilary Duff. He also made a guest appearance on an episode of Spy TV in 2002. He had a regular role doing voiceovers for the Cartoon Network show Sealab 2021, where he would parody himself. He appeared in an episode of another Cartoon Network show, Space Ghost: Coast to Coast, which features a character named Moltar who has an obsession with Estrada and CHiPS, as a guest. Estrada has also guest-starred on the children's cartoon Maya & Miguel.

Estrada has appeared in music videos, such as Eminem's music video "Just Lose It". A band named after Estrada (Estradasphere) is based in Santa Cruz, California. Estrada also made guest appearances on The Wayans Bros., Unhappily Ever After, the Nickelodeon comedy Drake & Josh, NBC's Scrubs and My Name Is Earl, and ABC's According to Jim. Estrada has been in a long-running series of infomercials as a national spokesman for National Recreational Properties, selling undeveloped real estate property in Siskiyou County, California; Lake Shastina, California; California City, California; Ocean Shores, Washington; Colorado, in addition to more recently, Tellico Village, Tennessee; and Bella Vista, Arkansas.

Estrada began appearing in Burger King TV commercials in September 2009. In the ads, he (playing himself) attended a class on endorsing products led by race car driver Tony Stewart. During the spoof, Estrada seeks to understand why American consumers were not interested in purchasing his "Estrada" sunglasses that noticeably had his last name written boldly across the lens.

Estrada appeared in many reality television shows. In 2004, he starred in both the second season of The Surreal Life and in Discovery Health Body Challenge. He also starred in the short-lived CBS reality show, Armed & Famous. In 2008, Estrada appeared in Husband for Hire, a television movie starring Nadine Velazquez and Mario López. After a series of specials, in 2010, Estrada and Laura McKenzie began co-hosting a show, The World's Funniest Moments, which began as a myNetworkTV series hosted by Arsenio Hall.

In 2011, Estrada was a contestant on the second season of the Univision reality show Mira Quien Baila, a weekly dance competition similar to Dancing with the Stars, in which he finished in third place out of ten contestants. In 2013, he starred in Finding Faith, a film about a young teenager who is kidnapped from a meeting planned online. It is based on true incidents investigated by the Internet Crimes Against Children Task Force. Estrada toured with the film with the aim of educating parents and young people about the dangers of online grooming. He played a minor role as a paramedic at the end of the movie in the 2017 movie "Chips"

=== Activism ===
In 2000, Estrada was named the international "Face" of D.A.R.E., which is a campaign against drugs. He speaks in support of the American Heart Association, the United Way, and the CHP 11-99 Foundation, a nonprofit organization providing benefits and scholarships to the California Highway Patrol family members, as well as funeral expenses for fallen officers. Estrada's experience in CHiPs led him to become a reserve officer for the Muncie Police Department in Muncie, Indiana. He became the spokesperson for the C.H.P.'s "car seat inspection and installation" program. He made numerous appearances supporting automobile child-seat safety checks across the country. He appeared in Española, New Mexico on May 28, 2009, to promote the "100 Days and Nights of Summer" traffic safety and anti-DWI campaign that involves the New Mexico State Police.

=== Law enforcement ===
Estrada became a reserve police officer for the Muncie Police Department, depicted on Armed & Famous. He moved to Virginia, where he was an I.C.A.C. (Internet Crimes Against Children) investigator for eight years in Bedford County, Virginia. As of July 1, 2016, he has been a reserve police officer in St. Anthony, Idaho. While working in the department, Estrada has been filmed patrolling on a police motorcycle.

== Personal life ==
Estrada was married to Joyce Miller in November 1979; the couple divorced in 1980 and had no children. Estrada was married to Peggy Lynn Rowe, an entertainment executive, songwriter, and producer from 1985 until 1990, when they divorced. The couple had two sons, Anthony Erik (born 1986) and pole vaulter Brandon Michael-Paul (born 1987). In 1997, Estrada and film sound technician Nanette Mirkovich married. They have a daughter, Francesca Natalia (born in 2000). He lives in the Studio City neighborhood of Los Angeles.

During an episode of Watch What Happens Live in January 2019, Marie Osmond told host Andy Cohen that she had briefly dated Estrada. Estrada is a member of the Blue Knights motorcycle club. He also rides with the Loyal Order of Moose fraternal and service organization.

Estrada endorsed Republican John McCain in the 2008 United States presidential election. Estrada was the celebrity guest of the Pekin Marigold Festival in Pekin, Illinois, in September 2017.

== Filmography ==
=== Film ===
Year	Title	Role	Notes
1970	The Cross and the Switchblade	Nicky Cruz	
1971	Chrome and Hot Leather	Uncredited	
1972	The Ballad of Billie Blue	Justin	
1972	Parades	Chicano	
1972	The New Centurions	Sergio	
1974	Airport 1975	Julio	
1976	Trackdown	Chucho	
1976	Midway	Ensign Ramos	
1977	Fire!	Frank	TV movie
1982	Honeyboy	Rico 'Honeyboy' Ramirez	TV movie
1983	Where Is Parsifal?	Henry Board II	
1985	Light Blast	Inspector Ronn Warren	
1985	The Repenter	Salvo Lercara	
1987	Hour of the Assassin	Martin Fierro	
1988	The Dirty Dozen: The Fatal Mission	Carmine D'Agostino	TV movie
1989	Alien Seed	Dr. Stone	
1989	Andy Colby's Incredible Adventure		
1989	The Lost Idol	Sgt. Kurt	
1989	Caged Fury	Victor	
1989	She Knows Too Much	Jimmy Alvarez	TV movie
1990	Twisted Justice	Commander Gage	
1990	A Show of Force	Machado	
1990	Night of the Wilding	Joseph	
1990	Spirits	Father Anthony Vicci	
1990	Guns	Juan Degas / Jack of Diamonds	
1991	Earth Angel	Duke	
1991	Do or Die	Richard 'Rico' Estevez	
1991	Gang Justice	Billy's Father	
1991	Earth Angel	Duke	TV movie
1992	The Last Riders	Johnny	
1992	The Divine Enforcer	Monsignor	
1992	Tuesday Never Comes	Micelli	
1992	The Naked Truth	Gonzales	
1992	The Sounds of Silence	Lester Maldonado	
1993	National Lampoon's Loaded Weapon 1	Officer Francis Poncherello	
1993	Angel Eyes	Johnny Ventura	
1994	Juana la Cubana	Coronel Peraza	
1995	The Misery Brothers	Himself	
1995	The Final Goal	Rameriez	
1996	Panic in the Skies!	Ethan Walker	TV movie
1998	Visions	Detective Francisco Moreno	
1998	The Modern Adventures of Tom Sawyer	Joe	
1998	Shattered Dreams	Fredrick	
1998	CHiPs '99	Officer Francis (Frank) Poncherello	
1998	Lost in Hollywood		
1999	King Cobra	Bernie Alvarez	
2000	Oliver Twisted	Dr. Castaneda	
2000	Destroying America	The Cop	
2000	We Married Margo	Himself	
2001	UP, Michigan!	Edward Manchester	
2002	National Lampoon's Van Wilder	Himself	
2004	Border Blues	Mexican Cop Morales	
2005	Taylor Made	William Santos	TV movie
2007	Kickin' It Old Skool		
2007	Mother Goose Parade	Honorary Grand Marshall	
2007	Husband for Hire	Victor Diaz	TV movie
2008	2nd Semester of Spanish, Spanish Love Song		
2009	Saving Melanie	Wilson Ramirez	
2011	Horrorween	Contractor	
2012	Highway	Sanchez	
2012	Spring Break '83	Himself	
2012	Cool Cat Stops Bullying	Himself	
2012	Cool Cat in the Hollywood Christmas Parade	Hollywood Parade MC (uncredited?)	
2013	Finding Faith	Sheriff Brown	
2013	This Is Our Time	Mr. Rowley	
2013	Templar Nation	Alfred De Molay	
2013	Chupacabra vs. the Alamo	Carlos Seguin	TV movie
2014	Planes: Fire & Rescue	Nick 'Loop'n' Lopez (voice)	Cameo
2014	Virtuous	Jack Evans	
2015	Cool Cat Saves the Kids	Himself (reused footage from Cool Cat Stops Bullying and Cool Cat in the Hollywood Christmas Parade)	
2015	Uncommon	Marc Garcia	
2016	El Americano: The Movie	Punch (voice)	
2017	CHiPs	Paramedic (uncredited)	
2018	Cool Cat Kids Superhero	Himself (re-cut of Cool Cat Saves the Kids)	
2022	Cool Cat Saves the Kids: The Director's Cut	Himself (re-cut of Cool Cat Kids Superhero)	
2023	A Knight to Remember	Mi Ultimo	

=== Television ===
Year	Title	Role	Notes
1973	Hawaii Five-O	Rono Vidalgo	Episode: "Engaged to Be Buried"
1974	Emergency!	Man with Eye Injury (uncredited)	Episode: "Details"
1975	Kojak	Luis	Episode: "Close Cover Before Killing"
1975	Mannix	Tropic	Episode: "Man in a Trap"
1975	Kolchak: The Night Stalker	Pepe Torres	Episode: "Legacy of Terror"
1975	Medical Center	Mike Moneda	Episode: "The High Cost of Winning"
1975	Police Woman	Benny Bates	Episode: "Don't Feed the Pigeons"
1975	The Six Million Dollar Man	Prince Sakari	Episode: "The Deadly Test"
1976	Baretta	Ortiz	Episode: "Dead Man Out"
1976	Barnaby Jones	Ruben	Episode: "Shadow of Guilt"
1976	The Quest: The Longest Drive	Santos	
1977–1983	CHiPs	Officer Frank Poncherello	
1978	The Love Boat	Jim Warren	Episode: "Julie's Aunt/Where Is It Written?/The Big Deal"
1983	Un solo corazón	Luis	
1987	Hunter	Sgt. Brad Navarro	
1987	Rosa salvaje	Teniente Rocha	
1988	Alfred Hitchcock Presents	Vinnie Pacelli	Episode: "The Big Spin"
1991	Extralarge: Cannonball	Gonzales	
1993	Extralarge: Gonzales' Revenge	Gonzales	
1993–1994	Dos mujeres, un camino	Juan Daniel Villegas 'Johnny'	
1994	American Adventurer	Host	
1995	The Nanny	Himself	Episode: "Kindervelt Days"
1995	Cybill	Himself	Guest appearance
1996	The Wayans Bros.	Himself	Guest appearance
1996	Pauly	Himself	Guest appearance
1996–1997	Sabrina the Teenage Witch	Himself	Guest appearance
1997	Over the Top	Himself	Guest appearance
1997	We Are Angels	Graciano	
1997	Baywatch	Captain Huntington	Episode: "Search & Rescue"
1997	Space Ghost Coast to Coast		
1997	Martin	Chip	Episode: "You Play Too Much"
1997	Homeboys in Outer Space	Dork	Episode: "How the West Was Lost or, Daddy's Home"
1998	Tracey Takes On...	Self	Episode: "Hollywood"
1998	King of the Hill	Mexican Judge	Episode: "Peggy's Pageant Fever"
1999	Family Guy	Ponch	Episode: "I Never Met the Dead Man"
1999	Walker, Texas Ranger	Brock	Episode: "The Lynn Sisters"
1999	Pacific Blue	Julio Constanza	Episode: "Stargazer"
1999–2000	Walking After Midnight		
2000	Popular	Himself	Guest appearance
2000	Son of the Beach	President Seymour Wences	Episode: "South of Her Border"
2000–2005	Sealab 2021	Marco (voice)	
2001	The Bold and the Beautiful	Eduardo Dominguez	
2001	Shasta McNasty	Himself	Guest appearance
2001	The Weakest Link	Himself	Classic TV Stars Edition #2
2002	Lizzie McGuire	Alejandro	Episode: "El oro de Montezuma"
2002	American Family	Police Officer	Episode: "The Barber Shop"
2002–2005	¡Mucha Lucha!	El Custodio (voice)	
2003	Scrubs	Himself	Guest appearance
2004	Drake & Josh	Police Officer	Episode: "Driver's License"
2004	The Surreal Life	Cast member in season 2	Reality TV series
2004	Maya & Miguel	Voice	
2005	The King of Queens	Himself	Voice appearance
2005	JoJo's Circus	Mr. Muscles (voice)	3 episodes
2005	Higglytown Heroes	Ambulance Driver Hero (voice)	Episode: "Kip Joins the Circus/Baby Boom"
2006	According to Jim	Himself	Guest appearance
2006	Back to the Grind		Unsold pilot
2007	Armed & Famous	Himself	Canceled after 4 episodes
2008	Life	Himself	Guest appearance
2009	My Name Is Earl	Himself	Guest appearance on 2 episodes
2009	Meet the Browns	Francisco / Mr. Hernandez	Episode: "Meet the Mexican"
2010	Big Time Rush	Carlos' Dad	Episode: "Big Time Break"
2010–2012	Adventure Time	King Worm	2 episodes
2011	Mira Quien Baila		Univision
2011	Phineas and Ferb	Additional voices	
2012	Are We There Yet?	Lester	Episode: "The Green Episode"
2013	Second Generation Wayans	Mr. Martinez	Episode: "Miss Independent"
2016	Liv and Maddie	Mr. Bustamante	
2016	Still the King	Himself	Episode: "A Family, a Fair"
2017	Malibu Dan the Family Man	Roman Lockwood	3 episodes
2020	Picture Perfect Mysteries	Luis Acosta	
2023	The Masked Singer	Himself	Provides clues
2023	Call Me Kat	Rodrigo	Episode: "Call Me Ichabod Evel Knievel"
2023	Divine Renovation	Himself	Host
2024	Fallout	Adam	Episode: "The Radio"

=== Video games ===
Year	Title	Voice
1996	You Don't Know Jack Volume 2	Himself

== See also ==
- List of people from Harlem
