= List of Marie episodes =

The first season of Marie, an American talk show, began October 1, 2012, is being released on DVD on November 1, 2013 by Sony Pictures Home Entertainment and airs on The Hallmark Channel.

== Episodes ==
No.	Main guest	Original release date
1	"Betty White"	October 1, 2012
2	"Fran Drescher"	October 2, 2012
3	"Melody Thomas Scott"	October 3, 2012
4	"Marissa Jaret Winokur"	October 4, 2012
5	"Mark Steines & Paige Davis"	October 5, 2012
6	"Kelly Monaco"	October 8, 2012
7	"Alana Stewart"	October 9, 2012
8	"Dean Cain"	October 10, 2012
9	"Peri Gilpin"	October 11, 2012
10	"Mary Hart"	October 12, 2012
11	"Mary Murphy"	October 15, 2012
12	"Christian LeBlanc"	October 16, 2012
13	"Florence Henderson"	October 17, 2012
14	"Kellie Martin"	October 18, 2012
15	"Tom Bergeron"	October 19, 2012
16	"Kristi Yamaguchi"	October 22, 2012
17	"Kristoff St. John"	October 23, 2012
18	"Abby Lee Miller"	October 24, 2012
19	"Kevin Nealon"	October 25, 2012
20	"Jamie Lee Curtis"	October 26, 2012
21	"Windell Middlebrooks"	October 30, 2012
22	"Linda Evans"	November 1, 2012
23	"Danica McKellar"	November 5, 2012
24	"Donny Osmond"	November 6, 2012
25	"Carnie Wilson"	November 8, 2012
26	"Vicki Lawrence"	November 12, 2012
27	"Marilu Henner"	November 14, 2012
28	"Lacey Chabert"	November 15, 2012
29	"Shaun Robinson"	November 21, 2012
30	"Jim O'Heir"	November 27, 2012
31	"Teri Polo"	November 29, 2012
32	"Bailee Madison"	December 3, 2012
33	"Christopher McDonald"	December 5, 2012
34	"Joey Lawrence"	December 11, 2012
35	"Jeff Lewis"	December 13, 2012
36	"Charles Shaughnessy"	December 17, 2012
37	"Suzanne Somers"	December 18, 2012
38	"Jeanne Cooper"	December 26, 2012
39	"Melissa Peterman"	December 27, 2012
40	"Margaret Cho/Montel Williams"	January 3, 2013
41	"LeVar Burton"	January 7, 2013
42	"Robert Patrick"	January 15, 2013
43	"Corbin Bernsen"	January 21, 2013
44	"Angela Kinsey"	January 22, 2013
45	"Heather Thomson"	January 21, 2013
46	"Luke Perry"	January 23, 2013
47	"Mark Steines & Cristina Ferrare"	January 24, 2013
48	"Jami Gertz"	January 28, 2013
49	"Drew & Jonathan Scott"	January 29, 2013
50	"James Tupper & Anne Heche"	January 30, 2013
51	"Eric Roberts"	January 31, 2013
52	"Joan Lunden"	February 4, 2013
53	"Daniel Goddard"	February 5, 2013
54	"Sean Kanan"	February 6, 2013
55	"William Baldwin"	February 13, 2013
56	"Sean Kanan"	February 14, 2013
57	"Patrick Warburton"	February 18, 2013
58	"Charlene Tilton"	February 19, 2013
59	"Rosie Pope"	February 20, 2013
60	"Shirley Jones"	February 21, 2013
61	"Frances Fisher"	February 25, 2013
62	"Jackie Collins"	February 26, 2013
63	"Leeza Gibbons"	February 27, 2013
64	"Penelope Ann Miller"	February 28, 2013
65	"Hugh Jackman"	March 4, 2013
66	"Willie Garson"	March 5, 2013
67	"Kevin Sorbo"	March 6, 2013
68	"Ricky Schroder"	March 7, 2013
69	"Nicole Sullivan"	March 11, 2013
70	"Vanna White"	March 12, 2013
71	"Jillian Michaels"	March 13, 2013
72	"Tate Donovan"	March 14, 2013
73	"Nick Offerman"	March 18, 2013
74	"Meredith Baxter"	March 19, 2013
75	"Kristin Bauer"	March 20, 2013
76	"Wes Brown"	March 21, 2013
77	"Anson Williams"	March 25, 2013
78	"Melissa Rivers"	March 26, 2013
79	"Marlee Matlin"	March 27, 2013
80	"Julie White"	March 28, 2013
81	"40 Years of Young and Restless"	April 1, 2013
82	"Deidre Hall"	April 2, 2013
83	"Manu Bennett"	April 3, 2013
84	"Candice Kumai"	April 4, 2013
85	"Aileen Quinn"	April 8, 2013
86	"Loretta Devine"	April 9, 2013
87	"Katy Perry"	April 10, 2013
88	"Alan Tudyk"	April 11, 2013
89	"Debby Ryan"	April 15, 2013
90	"Andy Dick"	April 16, 2013
91	"Lynda Carter"	April 17, 2013
92	"Shannon Miller"	April 18, 2013
93	"Ed Begley, Jr."	April 22, 2013
94	"Bellamy Young"	April 23, 2013
95	"Daisy Fuentes"	April 24, 2013
96	"Richard Simmons"	April 25, 2013
97	"Tuc Watkins"	April 29, 2013
98	"Kuk Harrell"	April 30, 2013
99	"Kurt Warner"	May 1, 2013
100	"Mariel Hemingway"	May 2, 2013
101	"Best of Marie!"	May 6, 2013
102	"Kuk Harrell/C. Thomas Howell"	May 7, 2013
103	"Jill Wagner"	May 8, 2013
104	"Nia Vardalos"	May 9, 2013
105	"Ian Ziering"	May 13, 2013
106	"Kuk Harrell/Keshia Knight Pulliam"	May 14, 2013
107	"Susan Olsen"	May 15, 2013
108	"La Toya Jackson"	May 16, 2013
109	"Todd Bridges"	May 20, 2013
110	"Kuk Harrell/Alicia Lagano"	May 21, 2013
111	"Behind the Scenes"	May 22, 2013
112	"Colin Mochrie"	May 23, 2013
113	"Annabelle Gurwitch and Steve Schirripa"	May 27, 2013
114	"Kuk Harrell/Jillian Rose Reed"	May 28, 2013
115	"Marc Friedland"	May 29, 2013
116	"Ace Young and Diana DeGarmo"	May 30, 2013
117	"Dawn Wells"	June 3, 2013
118	"Kuk Harrell/David Henrie"	June 4, 2013
119	"Corbin Bernsen"	June 5, 2013
120	"Ashanti"	June 6, 2013
121	"Rita Rudner"	June 10, 2013
122	"Jo Frost"	June 11, 2013
123	"Lou Ferrigno"	June 12, 2013
124	"Scott Baio"	June 13, 2013
125	"John C. McGinley"	June 17, 2013
126	"Kathy Ireland"	June 18, 2013
127	"Best of Marie: Part 2"	June 19, 2013
128	"Carter Oosterhouse"	June 20, 2013
129	"BJ Thomas"	June 24, 2013
130	"Patti Stanger"	June 25, 2013
131	"Behind the Scenes in Vegas"	June 26, 2013
132	"Grant Show"	June 27, 2013
133	"Mary Murphy"	July 1, 2013
134	"Elisabeth Röhm"	July 2, 2013
135	"Zendaya"	July 3, 2013
136	"George Wallace"	July 4, 2013
137	"Jeff Lewis"	July 8, 2013
138	"Buzz Aldrin"	July 9, 2013
139	"Ricky Schroder"	July 10, 2013
140	"Judy Blume"	July 11, 2013
141	"Tia and Tamera Mowry"	July 15, 2013
142	"Tabatha Coffey"	July 16, 2013
143	"Brandi Glanville"	July 17, 2013
144	"Catherine Bach"	July 18, 2013
145	"J. R. Martinez"	July 22, 2013
146	"Laila Ali"	July 23, 2013
147	"Chris Harrison"	July 24, 2013
148	"Angie Everhart"	July 25, 2013
149	"Sheryl Lee Ralph"	July 29, 2013
150	"Helen Reddy"	July 30, 2013
