= Marie (talk show) =

- Genre: Talk show
- Presented by: Marie Osmond
- Theme music composer: Marie Osmond; Gary Baker; Matt Johnson
- Opening theme: "Brand New Woman"
- Country of origin: United States
- Original language: English
- No. of seasons: 1
- No. of episodes: 150 (list of episodes)

Production
- Executive producers: Kari Sagin; David Martin; James Romanovich; Matt Lutz
- Running time: 40 to 42 minutes
- Production company: Associated Television International

Original release
- Network: Hallmark Channel
- Release: October 1, 2012 – July 30, 2013

Marie is an American talk show television series hosted by musician, actress and film screenwriter Marie Osmond. Debuting on October 1, 2012, it is produced by Associated Television International and aired on Hallmark Channel. The entirety of the first season was shot at Avenue Six Studios in Van Nuys, California.

It was announced on July 3, 2013, that Marie would not return to the Hallmark Channel. The series' distribution company, Associated Television International, is planning to shop the series for broadcast syndication with the return being slated for fall 2014. New episodes continued to air until July 30, 2013. It was later announced on November 25, 2013, that Marie would begin to air on the Reelz channel with the premiere on January 6, 2014. The series is still being shopped for syndication.

== Concept ==
Marie is promoted as being an "inspirational journey to help people make a difference in their lives." The show features celebrity and non-celebrity guests who drop by for revelatory discussion of lifestyle tips and trends, socially important issues, and breakthroughs, which empower families. Osmond imparts her insights on surviving all of life’s roadblocks and detours with heartfelt advice about how to survive and move on with dignity, humor and optimism. Through the series, Osmond uses her life experiences (such as her greatest successes and most crushing disappointments, including marriage and divorce, the trials of raising eight children, depression, and more), in hopes to provide insights, which can encourage everyone can come through.

The show also features a variety of segments, from cooking to home makeovers, as well as performances and fashion segments.

== See also ==
List of Marie episodes
