= Associated Television International =

American television production company

- Type: Private
- Industry: Television
- Founded: January 2, 1982; 44 years ago
- Founder: David McKenzie
- Headquarters: Burbank, California, United States
- Key people: David McKenzie (president); Richard Casares (executive vice president); James Romanovich (president, Worldwide Media and Entertainment)
- Services: Television production; Television syndication
- Website: www.associatedtelevision.com

Associated Television International is a television production company mainly specializing in American and international syndication through production and distribution. The company is based out of a facility on Empire Avenue in Burbank, mainly distributing and producing their own programming.

== Filmography ==
Title	Years
Crime Strike	1998–2014
Masters of Illusion	2000–present
Laura McKenzie's Traveler	2004–present
The World Magic Awards	2007, 2008, 2009
The World's Funniest Moments	2008–present
Chiller 13: The Decades Scariest Movie Moments	2010
Daytime Emmy Awards	2009–11, 2020–present
Chiller 13: Horror's Creepiest Kids	2011
The Movieguide Awards	2011, 2012
The Gracie Awards	2011
Hollywood Christmas Parade	2009–present
Inside Story: Ferris Bueller's Day Off	2011
The Rocky Saga: Going the Distance	2011
Elizabeth Stanton's Great Big World	2011–present
Bristol Palin: Life's a Tripp	2012
Marie	2012–2013
World's Funniest Animals	2020–present
Cash Cowboys	2017–present
