= Jennifer Veal =

English actress and internet personality

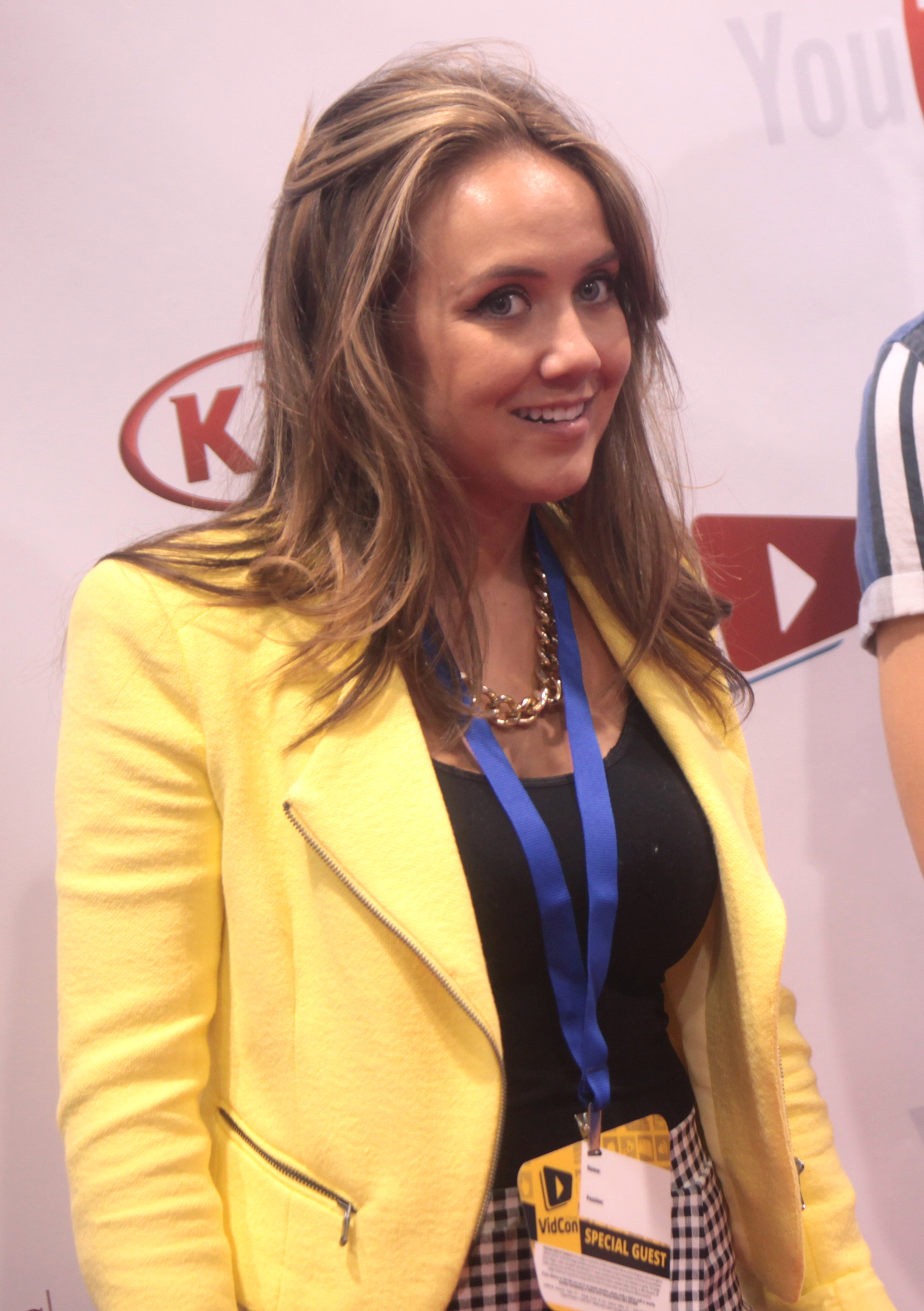
- Veal at VidCon in 2014
- Born: Jennifer Anne Veal; 7 September 1991 (age 34); Coventry, West Midlands, England
- Education: Sylvia Young Theatre School
- Occupation: Actress • internet personality
- Years active: 2001–present
- Spouse: George Hack (m. 2020)
- Children: 2

Jennifer Anne Veal (born 7 September 1991) is an English actress and internet personality. She made her acting debut playing Lucy on the television series As the Bell Rings (2007–09). She created her YouTube channel in 2012, and rose to fame for her videos in collaboration with Lucas Cruikshank from 2013 to 2014.

Veal played Agatha on Jessie (2012–13), Ally on Descendants: Wicked World (2015), Abby on This Just In (2016–2017), and Zhan Tiri on Rapunzel's Tangled Adventure (2019–2020), all of which were recurring roles. Her guest appearance in a 2012 Victorious episode earned her a Young Artist Award nomination.

== Early life ==
Jennifer Veal was born in Coventry. She began dancing at the age of five, and first appeared on stage, playing the role of "Baby June" in Gypsy at the Warwick Arts Centre, Coventry at the age of 10. A year later, she made her West End debut in Chitty Chitty Bang Bang at The London Palladium, working with stars such as Michael Ball and Wayne Sleep, and eventually was offered a place at the Sylvia Young Theatre School, in London.

== Career ==
Veal's debut was with a guest appearance in 2007, in a voice role for Holi Hana/Hana's Helpline as the character Ellen. She then was cast in her first major role as the main character Lucy in Disney Channel UK's As the Bell Rings, one of many adaptations of the original Italian version, entitled Quelli dell'intervallo. She played the role for two years until 2009, when the show ended.

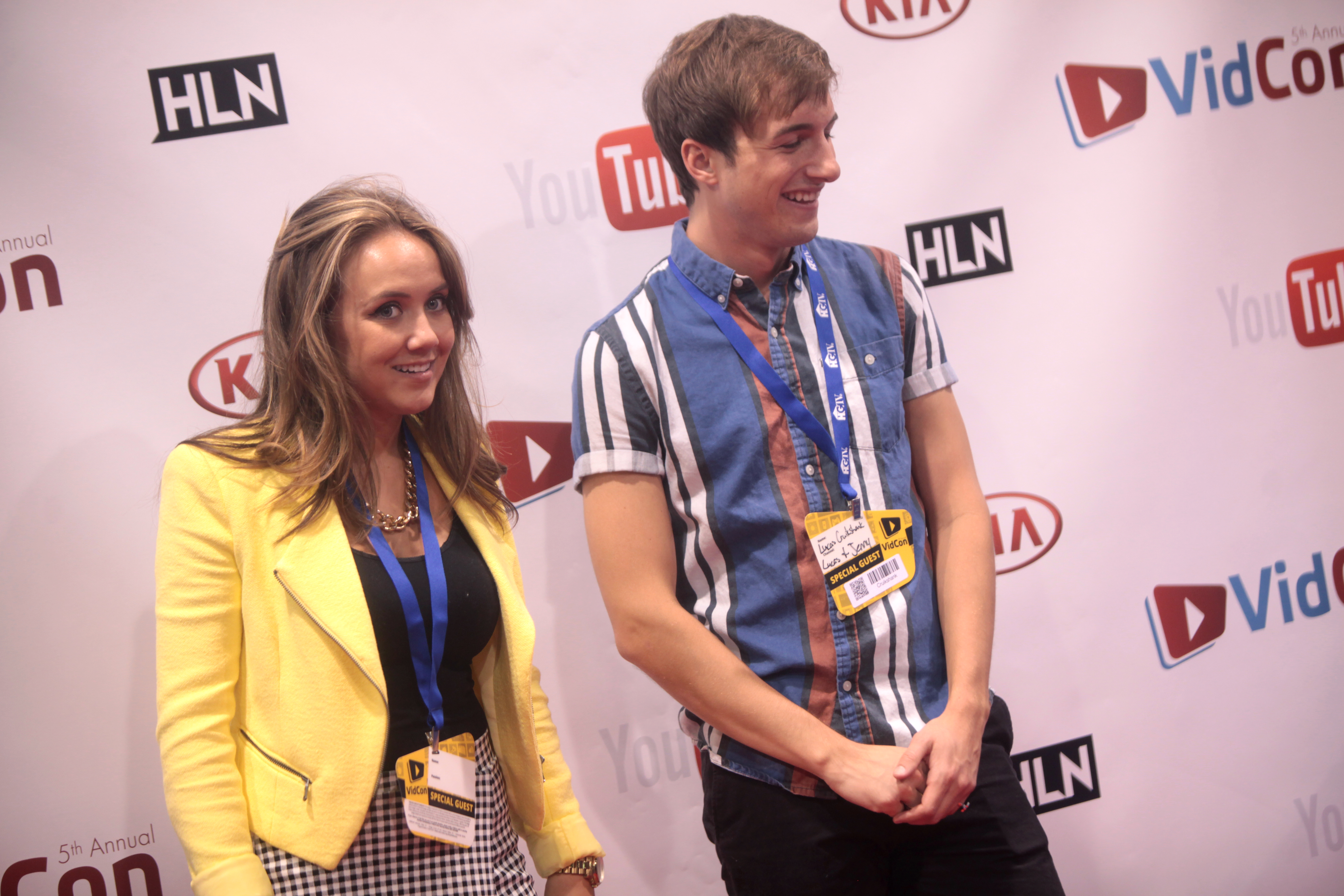
Veal and Lucas Cruikshank, her former collaborative partner on YouTube, at VidCon in 2014.

In 2012, Veal started a YouTube Channel entitled "jenniferveal28" in which her content was focused more towards comedy. The following year, she met YouTuber and actor Lucas Cruikshank, who is best known for creating the character Fred Figglehorn, and soon began to collaborate in several videos on his channel, which varied from skits and vlogs. At the time, the channel had been titled "Lucas and Jenny". In 2014, she departed from Cruikshank's channel to focus on her channel, as well as pursue other ventures.

Also in 2012, Veal landed the recurring role of Nanny Agatha on Disney Channel sitcom Jessie, which she played until 2013. Her performances as the "hideous" nanny brought notoriety to Veal, and she received praise for her performance. Later in 2012, Veal made a guest appearance as Chelsea in the Nickelodeon sitcom Victorious, in the episode "Tori Goes Platinum". For her performance, she earned a Young Artist Award nomination.

In 2015, Veal had a recurring voice role as Ally in the Disney Channel Animated Series Descendants: Wicked World, which is part of the Descendants franchise. In 2016, she recurred as Abby in the television series This Just In. Veal played the character until the show's end in 2017. Also in 2017, she had a guest role as Princess Magma in Penn Zero: Part-Time Hero.

In 2018, Veal made her film debut as the main role of Brooke in the action film The Agency. In 2019, she began starring in a recurring voice role in the Disney Channel animated series Rapunzel's Tangled Adventure, and also appeared in two episodes of the television show Evil Touch as Vicki.

== Personal life ==
Veal married her husband George Hack in November 2020. They have two daughters, born in July 2021, and October 2023, respectively.

== Filmography ==
Year	Title	Role	Notes
2007	Holi Hana or Hana's Helpline	Ellen (Voice)	Episode: "Methu a Hedfan"
2007–09	As the Bell Rings	Lucy	20 episodes
2012–13	Jessie	Nanny Agatha/Angela	Recurring role
2012	Victorious	Chelsea	Episode: "Tori Goes Platinum"
2012	The Elder Scrolls V: Skyrim – Dawnguard	Fura Bloodmouth (Voice)	Video game
2015	Descendants: Wicked World	Ally	Recurring voice role
2016–17	This Just In	Abby	10 episodes
2017	Penn Zero: Part-Time Hero	Princess Magma	Episode: "A Tale of Two Wizards/Rockullan, Papyron, Scissorian"
2018	The Agency	Brooke	Main role
2019–2020	Rapunzel's Tangled Adventure	Zhan Tiri	12 episodes
2019	Evil Touch	Vicki	2 episodes
2020	World's Funniest Animals	Guest	1 episode

== Awards and nominations ==
Year	Award	Category	Work	Result	Ref.
2014	Young Artist Award	Best Performance in a TV Series - Guest Starring Young Actress	Victorious	Nominated	
