= The World's Funniest Moments =

Television series

- Presented by: Arsenio Hall (2008–2009); Erik Estrada & Laura McKenzie (2010–present)
- Country of origin: United States
- Original language: English

Production
- Running time: Approx. 60 minutes
- Production company: Associated Television International

Original release
- Network: MyNetworkTV (2008–2009); Syndication (2010–present)
- Release: October 8, 2008 – present

The World's Funniest Moments is a reality television series produced by Associated Television International. Taped in front of a live audience, the show features humorous video clips taken from the Internet and submitted by viewers.

The series results in part from the popularity of YouTube and is described as "capturing life's most outrageous moments caught on tape". But what makes this show different, according to Hall, is that many of the videos produced are short films produced by aspiring Spike Lees. A number of the short films come from shortbrain.tv.

The series originally ran on MyNetworkTV, until that network decided to focus on reruns of older shows, the network did not renew The World's Funniest Moments for 2009-2010.

The show resumed in syndication for the Fall of 2010 with Erik Estrada and Laura McKenzie hosting.

== Weekly features ==
On myNetwork, most episodes included an educational film from the 1940s or 1950s whose humor derives from the outdated advice and presentation. Another weekly feature was a segment called, "What's on your cellphone?" where Hall picked a random contestant and appeared to display video from that person's phone on the big screen. Other videos went under the heading "Have you lost your mind?"

== Related series ==
MyNetworkTV aired a series of holiday specials hosted by Estrada and McKenzie: Santa's Funniest Moments in 2007; and three specials in 2008: Easter's Funniest Moments, Mom's Funniest Moments and Dad's Funniest Moments. Cupid's Funniest Moments, which aired Feb. 13, 2008, achieved two milestones for MyNetwork: the most viewers ages 18 to 49 ever in the 8-9 P.M. time period (818,000) and the most viewers in all (1.7 million). All of these specials were produced by Associated Television International, and featured home videos as well as John Ross persuading ordinary people to play pranks in hopes of winning money. For example, with the contestants' help and hidden cameras, Ross tried to rent a car wearing a strait jacket and attempted to rent a hotel room accompanied by a goat, among other pranks. The World's Funniest Moments continued to use home videos, but in the myNetwork version, hidden camera pranks were limited to those submitted by viewers or users of web sites. Ross and his hidden camera pranks returned for the syndicated version. Elizabeth Stanton also appeared in that show, usually the victim of pranks before commercial breaks.

Estrada, McKenzie and Ross returned Associated Television's syndicated Santa's Wild & Wacky Christmas in the 2009 Christmas season, with bloopers, funny videos and hidden camera pranks.
