= Cool for Cats =

Cool for Cats may refer to:

- Cool for Cats (album), a 1979 album by Squeeze
  - "Cool for Cats" (song), from the same album
- Cool for Cats (TV series), British TV series that featured music for a teenage audience, 1956–1961
