= Cool Cat Saves the Kids =

2015 American family film

- 2022 re-release cover
- Directed by: Derek Savage
- Written by: Derek Savage
- Based on: Cool Cat book series by Derek Savage
- Produced by: Derek Savage
- Starring: Erik Estrada; Vivica A. Fox; Derek Savage; Jason Johnson
- Cinematography: Stephen Treadway
- Edited by: James Christopher; Jason Christopher
- Music by: Mark Koval; Michael Lee Bishop; George Sarah
- Production company: Cool Cat Productions
- Release date: February 1, 2015
- Running time: 75 minutes
- Country: United States
- Language: English

Cool Cat Saves the Kids is a 2015 American independent family film. It was the feature-length directorial debut of Derek Savage, who was also the film's writer and producer. It is based on Savage's Cool Cat children's book series. The film is an anti-bullying movie aimed at children featuring Vivica A. Fox and Erik Estrada, as well as Savage himself and other lesser-known actors. Part of the film was funded through Kickstarter. The film was near-universally panned by Internet reviewers.

In the film, Cool Cat, an anthropomorphic cat, teaches children about topics such as how to deal with bullying and gun safety. The film uses footage from three Cool Cat shorts Savage had previously created: Cool Cat Stops Bullying, Cool Cat in the Hollywood Christmas Parade and Cool Cat Finds a Gun.

== Plot ==
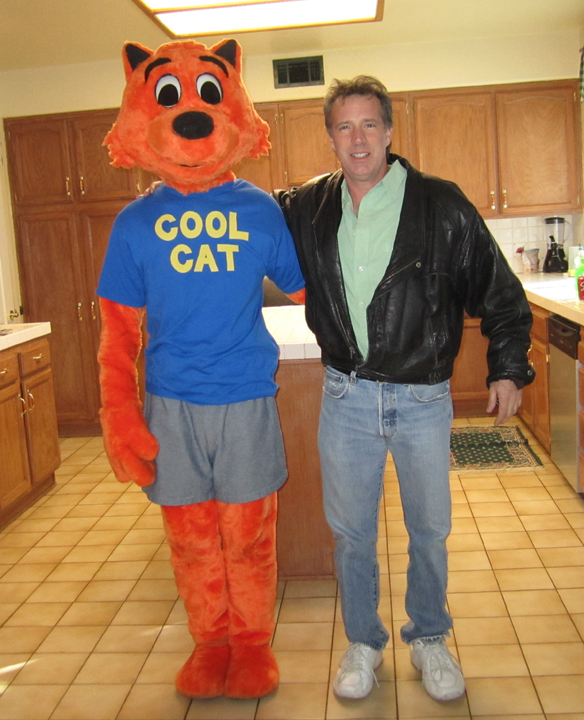
Cool Cat and Derek Savage

Cool Cat is making signs for his school president campaign with one of his friends, Maria, when Maria receives a text from a number she doesn't recognize. Cool Cat entices Maria to open the message, despite not knowing who sent it – it reads that Maria is ugly and has rat hair. After several more exchanges, they discover that Butch the Bully, a neighborhood kid lurking behind a car nearby, sent the text.

Butch runs away laughing and finds a can of spray paint, which he uses to ruin one of Cool Cat's signs. However, the wind forces some of the spray into Butch's eyes, forcing him to run away again. Butch enlists the help of two other boys, Jamie and Serge, to vandalize the neighborhood.

Upon discovering this, Cool Cat runs to confront the three about their behavior, causing Butch to flee and leave the spray can with the other two boys. When the boys are asked why they are doing what Butch says, they say it is because no one loves them. Cool Cat tells them that it isn't true, and that he loves them.

After arriving home and saying goodbye to Maria, Cool Cat heads upstairs to check his e-mails, and discovers that someone has sent him hate mail. Cool Cat tells the bully "If you were nice, you would have more friends, and friends are cool", with the bully replying that they will "get him tomorrow". Cool Cat freaks out about what the bully might do to him, causing him to have a nightmare. He arrives at the solution of standing up for himself.

On the next day, Cool Cat gets invited to be in the Hollywood Christmas Parade. He asks his parents, Daddy Derek and Momma Cat, if he can go, and they say yes. Cool Cat and Daddy Derek compose and perform a rock song ("Cool Cat Loves to Rock"), and make a music video ("Cool Cat Boogie"). The two then participate in the Hollywood Parade together.

At a barbecue hosted by Vivica A. Fox and Erik Estrada, Cool Cat and Maria build a sandcastle, but Butch knocks it down, causing Cool Cat to feel sad and confused. Fox and Estrada give Cool Cat advice on how to stand up to bullies. When Butch returns demanding lunch money, Cool Cat stands up to Butch for the first time, yelling at Butch and causing him to run away. Cool Cat then goes home and learns of a kids writing contest from one of Daddy Derek's "entertainment magazines".

Some time later, Cool Cat and his friends hear a radio alert that someone is stealing candy from babies. They identify Butch as the culprit. Cool Cat chases Butch down, and Butch gets arrested by a police officer. Cool Cat and his friends then find a gun in the grass. They decide to tell Daddy Derek about it, but Butch (now released from custody) steals the gun, planning to extort kids at school out of their lunch money. Daddy Derek learns of Butch's plans and calls Butch's parents. The following morning, Daddy Derek escorts Cool Cat and his friends to school, where they see Butch showing off the gun to Jamie. The police officer arrives at the scene and arrests Butch and Jamie.

Cool Cat wins his election for school president, as well as the writing contest, for which he receives $100. The film ends with Cool Cat, Maria and Jamie sitting around a table and talking about what they learned.

== Cast ==
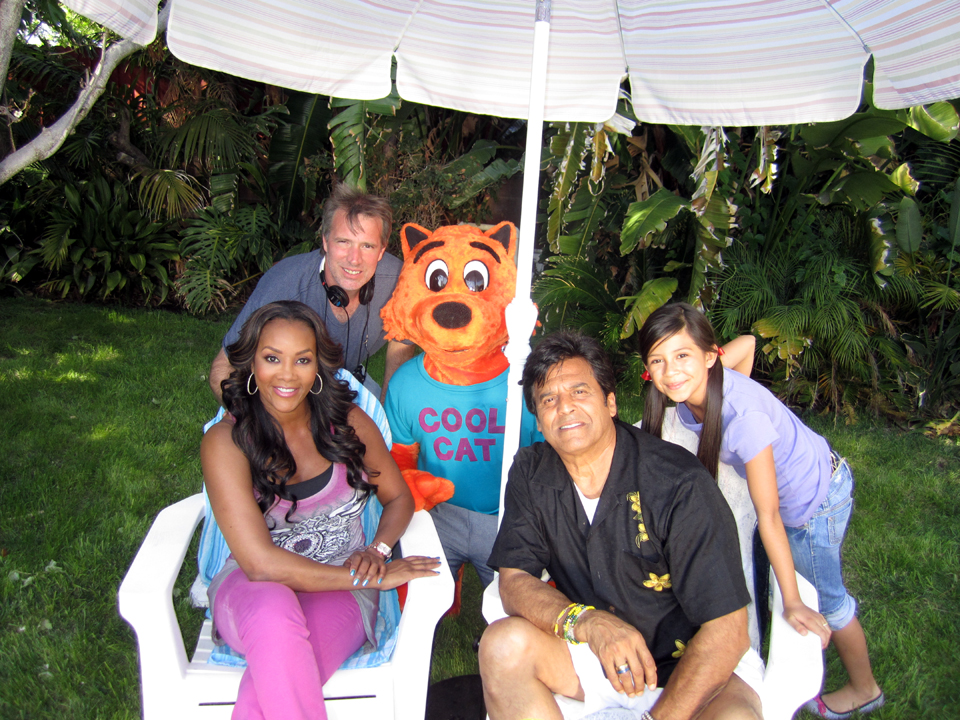
The cast of Cool Cat Saves the Kids. From left to right: Vivica A. Fox, Derek Savage, Jason Johnson (in costume), Erik Estrada and Jessica Salazar.

- Jason Johnson as Cool Cat
- Derek Savage as Daddy Derek
- Erik Estrada as himself
- Vivica A. Fox as herself
- Jessica Salazar as Maria
- Connor Dean as Butch the Bully
- Mikee Loria as Jamie
- Sergio Blanco as Serge
- Madison Steinacker as Madison
- April Ann Reese as the voice of Momma Cat
  - Jennifer Kersey and Lisandra Salazar as Momma Cat's suit actors
- Laura McKenzie as Hollywood Parade MC
- Anita Curran as Parade Girl
- Steve Crest as Police Officer Crest
- Blair Wright as Pointing Kid
- Bill Hall as Butch's Dad
- Sean Talbott as Radio Announcer
- April Berry as April the Teacher
- Starwil Reed as Smiling Teacher
- Alexandra N. McGee as Screaming Girl for Help
- Mackayla McGee as We Need Cool Cat Girl

== Sequels ==
The film was re-released with alterations in 2018 as Cool Cat: Kids Superhero, and in 2022 as Cool Cat Saves the Kids – the Director's Cut. The 2022 Director's Cut notably re-dubs Cool Cat's voice acting with Derek Savage as the voice of Cool Cat.

In 2021, a new Cool Cat short, Cool Cat Fights Coronavirus, was released. A feature-length sequel, Cool Cat vs Dirty Dog - The Virus Wars, featuring Art Nalls, and Joe Biden (through archive footage), was released for streaming digitally on December 16, 2023. Another proposed feature-length sequel, Cool Cat Stops a School Shooting, has been floated by Savage since 2018.

Savage released another gun safety-related film, Gun Self-Defense for Women, in 2016, which was instead aimed at adults. Footage from "Cool Cat Saves the Kids" was included in this movie. It was also later released again as "Gun Self-Defense for Ladies - and for Men too" and "Guns, Knives, Mace - Self-Defense for All".

== Reception ==
Cool Cat Saves the Kids only had a home media release, and it did not receive significant mainstream media coverage. It was panned by Internet reviewers, with some considering it among the worst movies ever made, as well as a source of ironic enjoyment. The 2018 re-release Cool Cat: Kids Superhero was reviewed by PewDiePie in 2019 as part of his Cringe Tuesdays series. In 2023, users of the movie social network Letterboxd voted Cool Cat Saves the Kids as number 9 on its list of "10 Best 'So Bad, It's Good' Movies". Steve Terreberry, another popular YouTuber, also made a video on the film, titled, “Cool Cat… Worst Kids Movie Ever?” In the video, he says he “wish he could un-watch the movie” and summarizes it in a comedic and mocking way. As of September, 2026, the video sits at 1.7 million views.

In response to a negative review on the popular YouTube channel I Hate Everything, Derek Savage demanded that the review be deleted and put a YouTube copyright strike on the channel. Savage subsequently continued to harass the channel's owner, Alex Beltman, and threatened to file a lawsuit if the review was reuploaded. Beltman also claimed that Savage had emailed him impersonating a Los Angeles-based lawyer representing the producers of the 2012 Canadian film Jurassic Shark, which Beltman had also reviewed. Jim Vorel of Paste Magazine criticized Savage's actions, and argued that the review's use of movie clips was protected under the fair use doctrine of U.S. copyright law.

== See also ==
- List of films considered the worst
