= Penn Zero: Part-Time Hero =

American animated television series

- Genre: Action; Adventure; Superhero; Science fiction comedy
- Created by: Jared Bush; Sam Levine
- Voices of: Thomas Middleditch; Adam DeVine; Tania Gunadi; Alfred Molina; Larry Wilmore; Sam Levine
- Theme music composer: Jared Bush; Sam Levine; Ryan Shore; Beau Black
- Composer: Ryan Shore
- Country of origin: United States
- Original language: English
- No. of seasons: 2
- No. of episodes: 35 (61 segments) (list of episodes)

Production
- Executive producers: Jared Bush; Sam Levine
- Animators: Mercury Filmworks (season 1); Tycoon Animation (season 2); Top Draw Animation (season 2)
- Editor: Jhoanne Reyes
- Running time: 22 minutes (10:25 minutes per segment) (separate)
- Production company: Disney Television Animation (Note: Animation outsourced to Mercury Filmworks (in Season 1) and Tycoon Animation and Top Draw Animation (in Season 2).)

Original release
- Network: Disney XD
- Release: December 5, 2014 – July 28, 2017

Penn Zero: Part-Time Hero is an American animated television series created by Jared Bush and Sam Levine and produced by Disney Television Animation for Disney XD. The series debuted on December 5, 2014, as a preview, followed by the official premiere on February 13, 2015. The series was ordered on October 16, 2013, for a scheduled fall 2014 premiere. Bush, the series' co-creator, also co-wrote and co-directed Walt Disney Animation Studios' 2016 film Zootopia.

On April 22, 2015, it was announced that the series had been renewed for a second season. On July 19, 2016, it was announced that the show had been cancelled after two seasons. The series ended on July 28, 2017 with the hour-long series finale, "At the End of the Worlds". 35 episodes were produced.

== Premise ==
The series follows the adventures of Penn Zero, who unexpectedly inherits the job of his parents: being a part-time hero; a person who zaps into various alternate dimensions to take on the role of the hero in that world and save the day in their place. With the help of his friends, Boone, the part-time wiseman, and Sashi, the part-time sidekick, he must save the Multiverse and thwart the evil Rippen, a part-time villain and his part-time minion and principal of Penn's school, Larry.

== Episodes ==
Season	Segments	Episodes	Originally released	
Season	Segments	Episodes	First released	Last released
1	38	21	December 5, 2014	October 1, 2015
2	23	14	July 10, 2017	July 28, 2017

== Characters ==
=== Part-Time Heroes ===
- Penn Zero (voiced by Thomas Middleditch) is the main protagonist, a part-time hero and the son of two full-time heroes. Penn lives with his Aunt Rose and Uncle Chuck due to Rippen trapping his parents in a dangerous dimension known as the "Most Dangerous World Imaginable", and goes on part-time hero missions with his best friends Sashi and Boone. While Penn is the recognized leader of the group, he often asks advice from his parents by communicating with them through a futuristic device called a MUHU (Multi-Universe Hologram Uplink), and finds himself needing counsel from his friends as well.
- Boone Wiseman (voiced by Adam DeVine) is Penn's friend and a part-time wise man. Boone often bewilders his friends with his unconventional methods and thought processes, and at times they find him frustrating. However, Boone's unorthodox style has proven effective in helping his friends complete missions. His parents, like Penn's, were part-time heroes.
- Sashi Kobayashi (voiced by Tania Gunadi) is Penn's friend and a part-time sidekick. Sashi is often a voice of reason and understanding despite her hostile, action-ready demeanor, and informs the group of their missions using her futuristic glasses, referred to as "Specs". Sashi's parents are civilians and are initially unaware of her job until the second-season episode "The Kobayashis".
- Phyllis (voiced by Sam Levine) is a grouchy, often irritable Slavic woman who maintains the "Multi Universe Transprojector" (MUT) used by Penn and his team to travel to other worlds and fight evil. The MUT is located in an abandoned theater called The Odyssey, which is located next to the part-time villains' base at Fish Stick on a Stick. The episode "Zap One" reveals that she chose Penn and his parents to be part-time heroes, and the series finale reveals her to be the good half of a cosmic entity who oversees balance.

=== Part-Time Villains ===
- Rippen (voiced by Alfred Molina) is the main antagonist, a part-time villain and an art teacher at Penn's high school. He aspires to become a full-time villain, which requires him to successfully accomplish an evil scheme without being thwarted by Penn's team. The second-season episode "Mr. Rippen" reveals that he is from another dimension and was chosen by Phil to be a part-time villain. In the series finale, Rippen and Larry, among others, are willingly stranded in the Most Dangerous World Imaginable after closing its portal from the other side.
- Larry (voiced by Larry Wilmore) is Rippen's part-time minion and the principal of Penn's high school. However, he is not particularly villainous, simply loyal to Rippen. Larry's futuristic glasses can project holographic displays with info on their missions, similar to Sashi.
- Phil (voiced by Sam Levine) is Rippen and Larry's Slavic assistant who operates their portal in the Fish Stick on a Stick restaurant. The series finale reveals him to be the evil half of the guardian entity.

=== The heroes' family ===
- Vonnie Zero (voiced by Lea Thompson) is Penn's mother, a part-time sidekick who, because of Rippen, is trapped in the "Most Dangerous World Imaginable", with her husband Brock. She loves her son dearly, and understands that he misses them. However, she is capable of handling herself in a fight despite being an ordinary human.
- Brock Zero (voiced by Gary Cole) is Penn's father, a part-time hero who, because of Rippen, is trapped in the "Most Dangerous World Imaginable" with his wife Vonnie. Brock is part fearless fighter, part loving father, with a tendency to bring up embarrassing things during holographic chats with his son and Penn's friends. He also appears to have a rather antagonistic relationship with Penn's uncle Chuck.
- Rose (voiced by Rosie Perez) is Penn's aunt, who he is staying with while his parents are away. Rose appears to have little in common with her relatives, and Penn struggles with living with her and her husband Chuck.
- Chuck (voiced by Lenny Venito) is Penn's uncle, a balding man who is apparently uninvolved in the family hero business. The pair of them find other pursuits, such as dressing their pet chinchilla, more entertaining.
- Sylvester (voiced by George Takei) and Tia Kobayashi (voiced by Lauren Tom) are Sashi's parents, who, unlike Boone and Penn's parents, were never part-time heroes and were initially unaware of the multiverse's existence, but love their daughter very much. They discover that Sashi is a part-time sidekick in the second-season episode "The Kobayashis".

=== Recurring ===
- Old Man Middleburg (voiced by Jess Harnell) is an elderly resident of Middleburg and an old friend of Larry.
- Alex (voiced by Brandon Scott) is a friendly jock at Middleburg Central High.
- Teddy (voiced by Thomas Middleditch) is a student at Middleburg Central High School.

=== Residing in other dimensions ===
- Scaley Briggs (voiced by Beau Bridges) and Amber Briggs (voiced by Olivia Holt) are a father and daughter from the town of Big Butte in a Wild West-themed world inhabited by cowboys and dinosaurs. Scaley is the sheriff of Big Butte and Amber is a quick-witted Dinosaur rustler. In the series finale, Scaley retires and passes his job to Amber.
- Captain Super Captain (voiced by Adam West) is a hero and electrician from a world inhabited by superheroes and villains. He possesses superpowers like flight, super strength, and energy manipulation.
- Professor Evil Professor (voiced by Adam West) is the evil brother and the nemesis of Captain Super Captain who has a Ph.D. in villainy. In the series finale, Professor Evil Professor is among those who accompany Rippen to the Most Dangerous World Imaginable.
- Blaze (voiced by Sean Astin) is a Flight School cadet from a world inhabited by humanoid dragons.
- Argelbleccht Blunkenthorthph (voiced by Elizabeth Henstridge) is the spoiled, beautiful princess of the Alien World.
- Nug (voiced by Maria Bamford) is a cavewoman from the Caveman Spy World and a member of the secret agency C.L.I.A. (Caveman Low Intelligence Agency).
- Lady Starblaster (voiced by Sigourney Weaver) is a high-ranking Galactic Conqueror and Rippen's love interest. In the series finale, Starblaster is among those who accompany Rippen to the Most Dangerous World Imaginable.
- Shirley B. Awesome (voiced by Wanda Sykes) is a military action figure from a world where toys come to life.
- Pirate Maria (voiced by Sonequa Martin-Green) and Boat Maria (voiced by Yvette Nicole Brown) are the inhabitants of the Pirate World who both have the same name. Maria is a pirate and Maria (her boat) is a living dolphin-like ship who accompanies her.
- Milkman (voiced by Paul Reubens) is a villainous milkman from a Cereal World who ruins cereal crops with his milk.
- Orchid (voiced by Rena Strober) is an enigmatic rose from Plant World who is a lounge singer and the adoptive sister of Fern, who is a fern.

== Production ==
The art style of the series was inspired by animated films in the 1950s and 1960s, mostly Disney films by such influential artists as Mary Blair, Eyvind Earle, Tom Oreb and Milt Kahl, but also from the more abstract and textured work of studios like UPA and Hanna-Barbera.

The series' original score was composed by Ryan Shore.

== Broadcast ==
Penn Zero: Part-Time Hero premiered on Disney XD in Canada on March 16, 2015. The series debuted on Disney XD in the United Kingdom and Ireland on May 14, on Disney XD in Australia on June 1, and on Disney XD in both the Middle East and Africa on September 7.
