= Laura McKenzie =

American actress

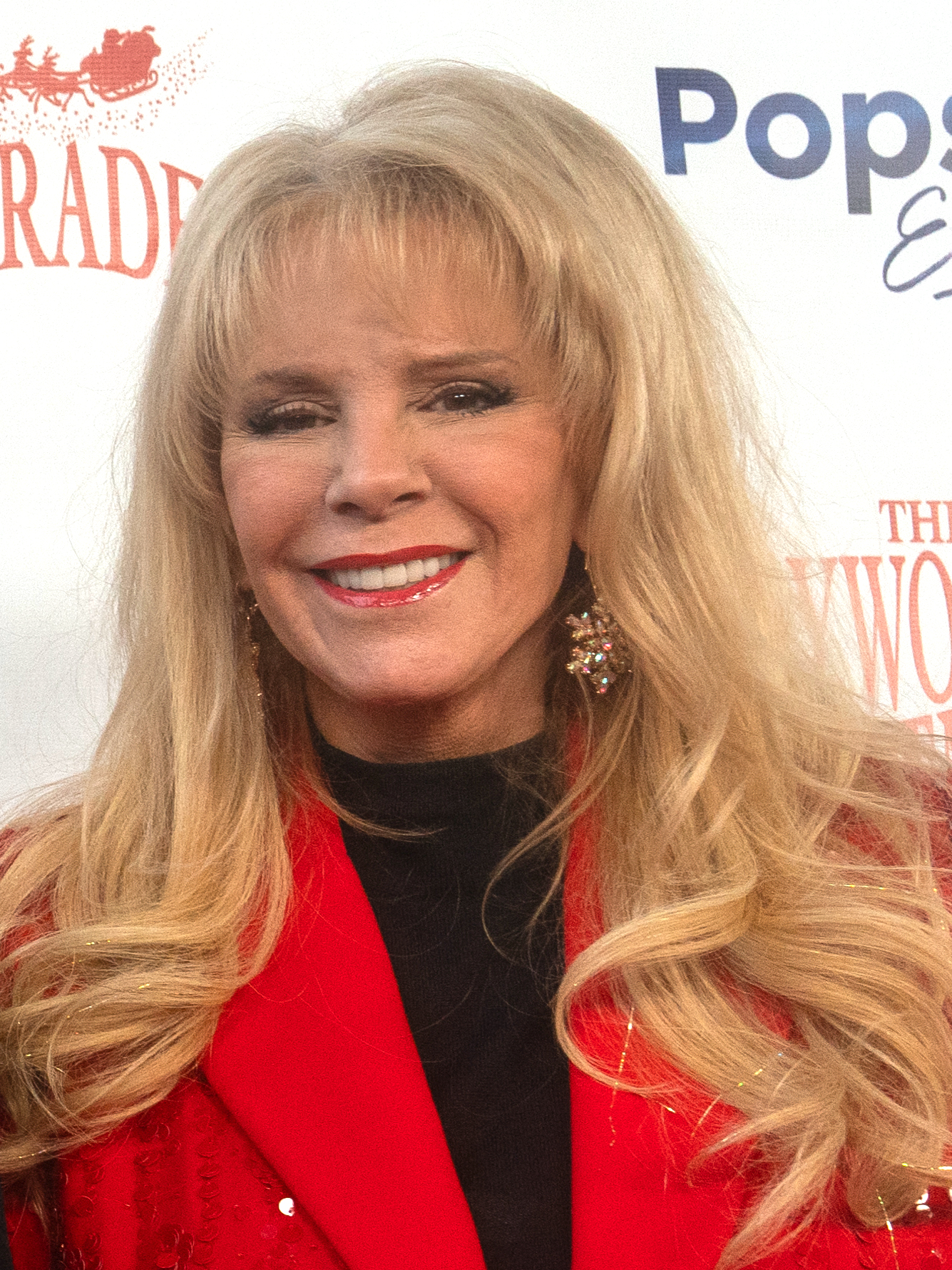
- McKenzie in 2024
- Born: 1963; Kansas City, Missouri, U.S.
- Occupation(s): Author; Writer; Television producer Presenter
- Website: lauramckenzietv.com

Laura McKenzie is an American author, television personality, and a two-time Emmy nominated travel host for her TV series Laura McKenzie's Traveler.

== Early career ==
Laura began her career as an NBC reporter, where she developed and became recognized for her informative two-minute "Travel Tips" segments. These instructive news segments were syndicated nationally throughout the 1980s. Post on-air travel tips, Laura had a syndicated Sunday newspaper column, "Laura McKenzie's Travel Tips.”

Laura wrote, hosted and produced 42 home video travel guides for Republic Pictures and in the early '90s she was awarded Billboard Magazine's "Number #1" award and Billboard Magazine's "Video of the Decade" award for the longest running title in the number one position in the special interest category for "Laura McKenzie's Travel Tips: Hawaii.”

Laura has written and hosted numerous television series, including Great Moments of the 20th Century for Discovery Channel (26 hours), Laura McKenzie’s Round Trip for Travel Channel (52 half hours), Laura McKenzie’s Travel Tips for Travel Channel (26 half hours), Laura McKenzie’s Travel America for Discovery (52 half hours), and American Adventurer, the longest running adventure program on television, with 270 episodes running in syndication and on Discovery. In addition, she has starred in the following TV series: Platinum, Exposing the DaVinci Code, Unlocking Ancient Secrets of the Bible, The DaVinci Code Tour and Baby Animals (a children’s series).

She has starred in several feature-length motion pictures: Chill Factor, Visions, Red Sun Down, and The Lost Samurai.

Laura co-hosted American Adventurer for 10 years with Erik Estrada (later her co-host on The World's Funniest Moments). The show aired on KCAL-TV 9 in Los Angeles, and syndicated to 170 stations in the U.S. and in 100 countries around the world, winning two Telly Awards for "Best Hosts".

Her daily travel reports have aired on the Westwood One and NBC radio networks during the America in the Morning show, with favorite topics from business travel tips to travel gadget reviews.

== Present career ==
Laura McKenzie's Traveler (produced and syndicated by Associated Television International) received a Daytime Emmy nomination for Outstanding Special Class Writing in 2009 (McKenzie was head writer), and a nomination for Outstanding Special Class Series in 2010. In 2010, the Traveler episode titled "Vietnam" won the 2010 Gracie Award for 'Outstanding Magazine' from the Alliance for Women in Media, (AWM).

She hosted the Christmas Caroler Challenge on the CW with Dean Cain in 2019 and 2020, and co-hosted the 92nd Annual Hollywood Christmas Parade in 2024.

She has won several industry awards including Telly Awards, Davey Awards, Hermes Awards and more.
