= Nikki Exotika =

American television personality (born 1982)

- Born: January 27, 1976 (age 50)
- Occupations: Television personality, actress, singer
- Years active: 2006–present
- Television: 90 Day Fiancé

Nicole Sanders (born January 27, 1976), known professionally as Nikki Exotika and informally as Nikki Xtravaganza is an American television personality, actress and singer. She is best known for appearing on Season 10 of TLC's 90 Day Fiancé.

== Personal life ==
Nikki Exotika grew up in New Jersey near the Jersey Shore, but switched schools frequently due to bullying. She developed an interest in performing from a young age and has cited performers including Madonna, RuPaul, and Janet Jackson as influences. During her school years, she participated in marching band, choir, and after-school theatre club.

After developing an early interest in music and performance, Exotika moved to New York City following high school, where she connected with prominent ballroom figure Octavia St. Laurent, and became involved in the city's ballroom and entertainment circles. She began identifying as a transgender woman after high school and has discussed her experiences with gender identity, transition, and public perceptions of her identity in media interviews. Exotika has also attracted media attention for undergoing extensive cosmetic procedures, stating that she has spent more than US$1 million on surgeries including a rhinoplasty, breast implants, and calf implants.

She is a member of the House of Xtravaganza, one of the prominent ”houses” within the New York City ballroom scene, where she uses the name Nikki Xtravaganza. She was featured briefly in the 2024 documentary I'm Your Venus which explores the life and legacy of Venus Xtravaganza.

Exotika has also been outspoken about her Christian faith, and added that she doesn't follow politics, stating "I follow Jesus".

== 90 Day Fiancé ==
Exotika appeared on Season 10 of TLC's 90 Day Fiancé when she went to Moldova in 2023 to meet with her boyfriend, Justin Shutencov. Throughout the season they opened up about their issues, including how Exotika's journey as a transgender woman affected their dynamic. Shutencov abruptly broke up with Exotika over text, citing he felt that the relationship made him sacrifice his dignity.

== Filmography ==
Credits adapted from IMDb.

Television and film roles
Year	Title	Role	Notes
2023	90 Day Fiancé	Herself	18 episodes
2021	Hooked on the Look	Herself	2 episodes
2019	Orange Is the New Black	Gala Guest (uncredited)	Episode: "God Bless America"
2019	Mr. and Mrs. Jackson	Naomi	Episode: "Brooklyn Boosters"
2018	Pose	Working Girl (uncredited)	Episode: "Pink Slip"
2017	This Morning	Herself	1 episode
2016	Vamp Bikers Tres	Streetwalker	
2014	My Trans Life	Herself	Episode: "Transgender girl band: Singer creating America's first Transgender Music Act"
2010	Jerseylicious	Herself	Episode: "Gaga for Glam"
2008	The Tyra Banks Show	Herself	Episode: "Plastic Surgery Nightmares"
2008	Maury	Meryl	Episode: "Red Carpet Queens Revealed! Born a Man or a Woman!"
2006	Trantasia	Herself	Contestant in the 'World's Most Beautiful Transsexual Pageant'.

== Discography ==
=== As lead artist ===
==== Singles ====
Title	Year	Writer(s)	Producer(s)	Ref.
"Million Dollar Barbie"	2024	Kali J, Nicole Sanders	Eddy Beethoven Nunez	
"Padam Padam"	2023	Ina Wroldsen, Peter Rycroft	No producer credited	
"Your Body"	2019	Myah Marie	Myah Marie	
"Young Wild and Free"	2016	Kali J	Ryan Snow	
"All Lined Up"	2015	Nicole Sanders	No producers credited	
"Secret Girl"	2012	Nicole Sanders	No producers credited	
"Manwhore"	2011	Ashley Breathe, Nicole Sanders	No producers credited	
"Electric Touch"	2011	Ashley Breathe, Nicole Sanders	No producers credited	

==== Extended plays ====
Title	Details
Your Body	Released: March 7, 2021; Label: Self-released; Format: Digital download, streaming; Track listing: 1. "Your Body"; 2. "In the Night"; 3. "Do My Thang"; 4. "Hot Like That"; 5. "Sweat"

== See also ==
- Kara Leona
