= List of 90 Day Fiancé episodes =

90 Day Fiancé is an American reality television series on TLC.

== Series overview ==
Season	Episodes	Originally released	
Season	Episodes	First released	Last released
1	6	January 12, 2014	February 23, 2014
2	12	October 19, 2014	December 28, 2014
3	12	October 11, 2015	December 6, 2015
4	14	September 11, 2016	November 20, 2016
5	13	October 8, 2017	December 18, 2017
6	13	October 21, 2018	January 13, 2019
7	15	November 3, 2019	February 17, 2020
8	19	December 6, 2020	February 21, 2021
9	19	April 17, 2022	August 21, 2022
10	20	October 8, 2023	March 10, 2024
11	16	February 16, 2025	June 1, 2025
12	15	May 10, 2026	August 16, 2026

== Episodes ==
=== Season 1 (2014) ===
No. overall	No. in season	Title	Directed by	Original release date
1	1	"I Got My Visa!"	Jessica Hernandez	January 12, 2014
Four women come to the US to live with their American fiances using a unique 90 day K-1 visa. The couples have 90 days to wed before the visas expire.
2	2	"Culture Shock"	Jessica Hernandez	January 19, 2014
Paola has to adapt to living with Russ' parents and her wild ways leads to collisions with Russ's friends. Kirlyam misses her parents. Aziza meets Mike's skeptical family. Louis prepares his sons and ex-wife for Aya.
3	3	"Enough Is Enough"	Jessica Hernandez	January 26, 2014
Paola and Russ move into their new apartment. Aya meets Louis' ex-wife and sons. Kirlyam goes to a salon where she is referred to a modeling agency. Aziza and Mike hit a milestone in their relationship.
4	4	"90 Days Isn't Enough"	Jessica Hernandez & Kevin Rhoades	February 9, 2014
Russ takes Paola to a tailgate but their wedding plans are jeopardized. Alan is concerned when Kirlyam gets a modelling opportunity. Aziza is confronted by Mike's Mom at her bachelorette party. Aya gets upset as Louis cuts corners on their wedding.
5	5	"Didn't Expect This..."	Jessica Hernandez & Kevin Rhoades	February 16, 2014
Aziza upsets Mike when he went missing after his bachelor party. Kirlyam and Alan rush their wedding. Paola shops for a wedding dress but Russ might be called back to work. Aya cannot have the wedding of her dreams because of a limited budget.
6	6	"Time's Up"	Jessica Hernandez & Kevin Rhoades	February 23, 2014
Paola has her bachelorette party but is unsure if her wedding will take place. Aziza gets nervous before her wedding. Kirlyam and Alan are both virgins at their wedding night. Louis has Aya doubt as he arrives late for filing in this his wedding.

=== Season 2 (2014) ===
No. overall	No. in season	Title	Original release date
7	1	"Where Are They Now? Season 1 Couples"	October 19, 2014
An update on the couples featured in season one.
8	2	"New Couples, New Journeys"	October 19, 2014
Six foreigners visit their US partners to see if they really are compatible.
9	3	"I'm Home, America!"	October 26, 2014
Evelin pushes Justin to introduce her to his family. At Yamir's album release party his manager throws his private life into the public eye. Mohamed meets Danielle's skeptical son. Daya questions her engagement ring. And we meet a new couple Danny and Amy.
10	4	"Watch You Like a Hawk"	November 2, 2014
Justin manages to surprise his relatives with the news of his engagement whilst Daya meets Brett's daughter. Danny manages to miss Amy's first day in the U.S. whilst Mohamed is introduced to the rest of Danielle's family.
11	5	"Touchdown!"	November 10, 2014
Jason goes to Brazil, but is uncertain if Cassia will meet him; Mohamed learns a new meaning for a familiar phrase; Danny's family get on Amy's nerves; Yamir arrives in the U.S. and is welcomed by questions from Chelsea's parents about their future.
12	6	"Mo' Money, Mo' Problems"	November 17, 2014
Cassia argues with Jason about trust issues; Danny's date night with Amy is ruined by his brother; Danielle's family doubts that Mohamed will stick around; Justin finally sees his family after revealing his secret; Yamir's move comes with shocking news.
13	7	"Fears, Family, Future"	November 23, 2014
Justin and Evelin invite Jake and Jen over for dinner, Daya and Brett have a confrontation over Cassidy's behaviour, Amy's mother arrives, Yamir has a meeting with music producers, Jason surprises Cassia.
14	8	"I Have to Tell You Something"	November 30, 2014
Strain is put on Jason and Cassia, due to his work commitments. Danielle has some bad news for Mohamed. Justin's mother strikes up a bond with Evelin.
15	9	"Going Once, Going Twice...Gone?"	December 7, 2014
Danny and Amy's families meet. Cassia breaks down during a fight with Jason. Justin surprises Evelin and his mother. Mohamed visits a lawyer on his wedding day. Chelsea and Yamir discuss the future of his music career. Daya and Brett go apartment hunting.
16	10	"Red Flags"	December 14, 2014
Mohamed hopes he is making the right choice with Danielle, Danny's brothers pass him the sex torch, and Brett's mom confronts him about Daya the day before the wedding.
17	11	"I'm Gonna Go Home"	December 21, 2014
Chelsea panics before the wedding, Jason and Cassia try to resolve their differences in Vegas, Mohamed goes AWOL on Danielle, and Brett has to choose between Daya and his mom.
18	12	"Tell All"	December 28, 2014
The couples meet for the first time and tell all in a revealing emotionally charged 90 Day Fiance reunion special. NBC's Erica Hill moderates as we learn more about the couples' journeys and find out where their relationships stand.

=== Season 3 (2015) ===
No. overall	No. in season	Title	Original release date
19	1	"Where Are They Now? Season 2 Couples"	October 4, 2015
20	2	"Departures and Arrivals"	October 11, 2015
21	3	"Welcome to the Family"	October 18, 2015
22	4	"Questions & Answers"	October 25, 2015
23	5	"Full of Surprises"	November 1, 2015
24	6	"Missing Home"	November 8, 2015
25	7	"Lights, Camera, Drama"	November 15, 2015
26	8	"Don't Push Me"	November 22, 2015
27	9	"Bachelorette Blues"	November 29, 2015
28	10	"What Do You Know About Love?"	November 29, 2015
29	11	"This Is It"	December 6, 2015
30	12	"Tell All"	December 6, 2015

=== Season 4 (2016) ===
No. overall	No. in season	Title	Original release date
31	1	"For Your Eyes Only"	August 22, 2016
32	2	"You Say Goodbye, I Say Hello"	September 11, 2016
33	3	"Meet the Family"	September 18, 2016
34	4	"Life's a Beach"	September 25, 2016
35	5	"Testing the Waters"	October 2, 2016
36	6	"I Can See the Cracks"	October 9, 2016
37	7	"Time to Tell the Truth"	October 16, 2016
38	8	"This Is What You Came For"	October 23, 2016
39	9	"You're Gonna Miss Me When I'm Gone"	October 30, 2016
40	10	"Confessions of a Foreign Fiancé"	November 6, 2016
41	11	"Are You Ready for This?"	November 13, 2016
42	12	"Too Little Too Late"	November 13, 2016
43	13	"Speak Now or Forever Hold Your Peace"	November 21, 2016
44	14	"Tell All"	November 21, 2016

=== Season 5 (2017) ===
No. overall	No. in season	Title	Original release date
45	1	"Waiting Is The Hardest Part"	October 8, 2017
46	2	"Parental Approval"	October 15, 2017
47	3	"Bring on the 90 Days"	October 22, 2017
48	4	"Good Morning America"	October 29, 2017
49	5	"Family First"	November 5, 2017
50	6	"Crossing the Line"	November 12, 2017
51	7	"Welcome to Real Life"	November 19, 2017
52	8	"Out of Nowhere"	November 26, 2017
53	9	"Wake Up Call"	December 3, 2017
54	10	"Breaking Point"	December 10, 2017
55	11	"Second Thoughts"	December 17, 2017
56	12	"I Now Pronounce You"	December 18, 2017
57	13	"Tell All"	December 18, 2017

=== Season 6 (2018–19) ===
No. overall	No. in season	Title	Original release date
58	1	"The Clock Is Tickin'"	October 21, 2018
59	2	"Young and Restless"	October 28, 2018
60	3	"Rough Landings"	November 4, 2018
61	4	"I Know What You Did"	November 11, 2018
62	5	"Not What I Thought"	November 18, 2018
63	6	"Flirting With Disaster"	November 25, 2018
64	7	"Ready to Run"	December 2, 2018
65	8	"No Way Out"	December 9, 2018
66	9	"Backed Into a Corner"	December 16, 2018
67	10	"Where Truth Lies"	December 23, 2018
68	11	"Make it or Break it"	December 30, 2018
69	12	"Tell All (Part 1)"	January 6, 2019
70	13	"Tell All (Part 2)"	January 13, 2019

=== Season 7 (2019–20) ===
No. overall	No. in season	Title	Original release date
71	1	"I Want to Kiss You"	November 3, 2019
72	2	"They Don't Know"	November 10, 2019
73	3	"What Am I Worth to You?"	November 17, 2019
74	4	"You Don't Forget Your Past"	November 24, 2019
75	5	"We Need to Talk"	December 1, 2019
76	6	"Premature Departure"	December 8, 2019
77	7	"The Truth Shall Set You Free"	December 15, 2019
78	8	"Judgement Day"	December 22, 2019
79	9	"I Don't Have a Choice"	December 29, 2019
80	10	"Choose Me"	January 12, 2020
81	11	"Blindsided"	January 19, 2020
82	12	"I do and I don't know"	January 26, 2020
83	13	"Pillow talk: Can I get a witness?"	February 9, 2020
84	14	"Tell All, Part 1"	February 16, 2020
85	15	"Tell All, Part 2"	February 17, 2020

=== Season 8 (2020–21) ===
No. overall	No. in season	Title	Original release date
86	1	"I Think You're My Future Wife"	December 6, 2020
87	2	"Shame on You"	December 13, 2020
88	3	"Bless this Mess"	December 20, 2020
89	4	"What's Mine is Mine"	December 27, 2020
90	5	"Who's the Boss?"	January 3, 2021
91	6	"The Real You"	January 10, 2021
92	7	"You So Bad Boy"	January 17, 2021
93	8	"Unsure and Insecure"	January 24, 2021
94	9	"The No Bang Theory"	January 31, 2021
95	10	"The Devil's Work"	February 14, 2021
96	11	"Three's a Party"	February 21, 2021
97	12	"About Last Night"	February 28, 2021
98	13	"Forgive But Never Forget"	March 7, 2021
99	14	"Into Your Arms"	March 14, 2021
100	115	"Love Me or Leave Me"	March 21, 2021
101	16	"Second Guessing"	March 28, 2021
102	17	"First Comes Love…"	April 4, 2021
103	18	"Tell All, Part 1"	April 11, 2021
104	19	"Tell All, Part 2"	April 18, 2021

=== Season 9 (2022) ===
No. overall	No. in season	Title	Original release date
97	1	"Ketchup to My Mustard"	April 17, 2022
Divorced dad Bilal plans to test his fiancee when she arrives; Kara heads to the Dominican Republic to pick up her young beau, Guillermo; Jibri hopes to sway his Serbian love to stay in his hometown; Emily welcomes Kobe to meet their son.
98	2	"Home Sweet Hoax"	April 24, 2022
Bilal's test for Shaeeda begins. Kobe reacts to Emily's new post-baby look. Questions from Yve's friends about Mohamed get personal. Kara and Guillermo hope to make it to America with his expired passport.
99	3	"Pinot You Don't"	May 1, 2022
Bilal comes clean to Shaeeda; Emily's first-day request stuns Kobe; Miona meets Jibri's skeptical parents; Bini's confession to his sisters doesn't go as planned; Yve welcomes Mohamed to the U.S.
100	4	"Pasta La Vista"	May 8, 2022
Kobe is overwhelmed with emotions when he meets his son; Bini and Ari have a tense departure from Ethiopia; Jibri and Miona attempt to prepare a meal for his parents; Thais is not a fan of Patrick's brother, John.
101	5	"Breast Intentions"	May 15, 2022
Kobe and Emily argue over her breastfeeding habits in front of her parents; Bilal introduces Shaeeda to his kids; Thais lies to her dad and travels to America; Kara's family grills Guillermo; Mohamed meets Yve's son.
102	6	"If I Have to Turn This Car Around"	May 22, 2022
Bilal doesn't like Shaeeda's playful side; the pressure is already getting to Jibri; Guillermo wants Kara to slow down on partying; Bini envisions a future in the Big Apple; Thaís has no patience for John.
103	7	"It's Me or the Bikini"	May 29, 2022
Kara's ex-boyfriend has advice for Guillermo; Miona gives Jibri an ultimatum; Yve's friends grill Mohamed; Emily vetoes Kobe's parenting decision; Shaeeda pressures Bilal about kids.
104	8	"Get Off Your High Horse"	June 5, 2022
Jibri brawls with David in the studio; Mohamed expects Yve to convert; Thaís' hopes for a John-free future are dashed; Ari finds out Bini is sparring with a woman; Kobe snaps at Emily; Shaeeda thinks Bilal is a neat freak.
105	9	"Poison in the Honey"	June 12, 2022
Shaeeda tries to bond with Bilal's children; Miona continues to come between Jibri and David; Kobe and Emily's dad talk man-to-man; Pat's gift to Thais has strings attached; Guillermo's vision for their wedding doesn't match Kara's.
106	10	"In the Ring"	June 19, 2022
Pat and Thaís fight over finances; Jibri's parents shift his mind on marriage; Bini enters the MMA arena; Bilal blindsides Shaeeda with talk of a prenup; Kara goes drinking without Guillermo; Emily reveals a wedding purchase she made in secret.
107	11	"How to Marry a Stripper"	June 26, 2022
Kobe's happy proposal comes undone; Thaís lets a huge secret slip; Ari's ex is back and so is Bini's jealousy; Shaeeda questions her future with Bilal; Yve and Mohamed clash about kids; Jibri's parents bluntly assess his relationship.
108	12	"Different Ex-pectations"	July 3, 2022
Mohamed considers a new sponsor; Thais doubles down on keeping the truth from her dad; Bilal's ex pushes Shaeeda about the prenup; Kara and Guillermo reach a compromise; Miona refuses to budge on wedding locations.
109	13	"The Elephant in the Womb"	July 8, 2022
Emily takes a pregnancy test; Patrick demands that Thais tell her dad the truth; Guillermo gets cold feet; Shaeeda questions Bilal's motives behind asking for a prenup; Mohamed issues an ultimatum; Miona tells Jibri's mom they are eloping.
110	14	"Temperature Check"	July 17, 2022
Shaeeda turns the tables on Bilal and his prenup; Thais tells her dad the truth; Jibri clashes with his parents when they push him about his plans; Kara vents to friends about Guillermo's doubts; Ari and Bini make a momentous decision.
111	15	"Last Sip Single"	July 24, 2022
Kara and Guillermo tie the knot; Thais' uncertainty deepens in snowy Massachusetts; Emily discovers Kobe is looking at the future differently; Shaeeda gets unexpected advice from Bilal's mother; Mohamed makes a big move; Jibri and Miona move out.
112	16	"Here Comes the Pride"	July 31, 2022
Bilal's sister and Shaeeda have different wedding dress visions; Thais is torn between marrying Patrick and going home; Jibri hopes his parents will show up; doubts overwhelm Emily the night before the wedding; Yve's friend offers one more out.
113	17	"To Have and to Scold"	August 7, 2022
Emily and Kobe reveal their secret pregnancy; Patrick is desperate for Thais' dad to bless the marriage; Miona's wedding day vision isn't coming together; the wedding officiant asks Shaeeda and Bilal three times if they're sure they want to marry.
114	18	"Tell All, Part 1"	August 14, 2022
The cast members of Season 9 come together to relive their biggest moments and hash out unresolved dramas; Jibri gets confrontational; Shaeeda throws major shade when Bilal's ex joins the conversation.
115	19	"Tell All, Part 2"	August 21, 2022
The explosive second half of the Season 9 Tell All jumps back into the heated confrontation between Jibri and Patrick's brother, John. Mohamed clashes with Yve's friend, Jibri storms offstage, and Bini makes a shocking confession.

=== Season 10 (2023–24) ===
No. overall	No. in season	Title	Original release date
116	1	"Dearly Beloved"	October 8, 2023
Ashley's witchy spells can't stop her own panic attack about Manuel's arrival. Nikki demands sexual chemistry with Justin. LA Rob and posh Sophie come from different worlds. Jasmine gets a secret butt lift as Gino quits his job.
117	2	"We Are Gathered Here Today"	October 15, 2023
Nikki prepares for a trip to decide the fate of her relationship with Justin. Rob dances his way into Sophie's heart. Ashley's witchcraft and her pets seem to put a hex on Manuel. Jasmine reunites with Gino but realizes Michigan is her own personal hell.
118	3	"To Witness the Beginning"	October 22, 2023
Nikki lands in Moldova, but worries Justin is keeping her hidden. Jasmine finally tells Gino she got butt implants. After meeting Manuel, Ashley's family thinks his secrecy is a red flag. Rob's past haunts Sophie as she sees something shady on his phone.
119	4	"More to Love: Of These Two Lovers"	October 29, 2023
Jasmine tries to regain Gino's trust. Ashley grows skeptical when Manuel's family bombards her phone. Nikki demands intimacy from Justin. Sophie's reveal jeopardizes her engagement. Nick prepares for Devin to meet his family.
120	5	"Committed in Matrimony"	November 5, 2023
With Clayton's mom living in his closet, he worries about his fiancée's arrival. Sophie and Rob question each other's loyalty. Nikki gives Justin an ultimatum. Devin and Nick reunite in Korea. Jasmine blames a rash breakout on Gino's dirty apartment.
121	6	"If Anyone Objects to This Union"	November 12, 2023
Rob fears Sophie has left him forever. Anali rejects intimacy with Clayton. Devin breaks down in front of Nick's family. Nikki overshares with Justin's friends. Ashley worries Manuel is keeping secrets. Jasmine finds gloss in Gino's car.
122	7	"Speak Now or Forever Hold Your Peace"	November 19, 2023
Jasmine finds keepsakes from Gino's exes, making her spiral. Rob begs for Sophie's forgiveness. Justin wants Nikki to dress more conservatively. Manuel refuses to share his personal life with Ashley. Nick surprises Devin. Clayton's sister grills Anali.
123	8	"Do You Take One Another?"	November 26, 2023
Rob grovels and surprises Sophie with a trip. Jasmine goes ballistic over Gino's bachelor party. Justin's mom has a hard time embracing Nikki. Devin and Nick land stateside. Manuel confronts Ashley on her coffee consumption. Anali is torn between her mom and Clayton.
124	9	"To Have and To Hold"	December 3, 2023
Nikki learns Justin slept with other women during their relationship. Sophie reveals her big secret. Manuel and Ashley disagree on finances. Devin's family is taken aback by Nick's nickname for her. Citra's father has strict guidelines for her and Sam.
125	10	"For Better or for Worse"	December 10, 2023
Gino surprises Jasmine with a trip to get back on her good side after the strip club fiasco. Sophie thinks Rob is being cheap while they ring shop. Sam and Citra reunite. Nikki breaks down after Justin's shocking news. Anali struggles with her isolated life with Clayton.
126	11	"For Richer or for Poorer"	December 17, 2023
Rob and Sophie have an explosive fight in a sex shop. Sam reveals disturbing news to Citra. Clayton shares too much about his sex life with Anali. Ashley's mom squares off with Manuel. Gino and Jasmine arrive in Miami. It's wedding day for Devin and Nick.
127	12	"In Sickness and in Health"	January 7, 2024
Sophie's mom arrives with harsh judgments about Rob's small apartment. With Manuel's friend in town, Ashley and Manuel fight about finances. Justin's racy bedroom suggestion insults Nikki. Clayton confronts Anali about telling her father. Citra meets Sam's mom.
128	13	"To Love and To Cherish"	January 14, 2024
Rob is livid after getting lectured by Sophie's mom. Jasmine's bomb drop leaves Gino questioning their future together. Ashley and Manuel's sexual chemistry is taking its toll on her. Clayton cannot take Anali hiding their relationship anymore. Sam dreads telling the truth to Citra's dad. Nikki and Justin hash things out.
129	14	"First Look: From This Day Forward"	January 19, 2024
Rob worries Sophie may never have his back. Nikki and Justin go horseback riding. Fallout from Jasmine's revelation continues. Ashley surprises Manuel. Sam tells Citra's father his big secret. Clayton's mom reveals how she really feels about Anali.
130	15	"Till Death Do Us Part"	January 28, 2024
Nikki has a surprise for Justin at their engagement party. Manuel gets emotional as he and Ashley arrive in Florida for their wedding. Anali's bachelorette party is more than she could have hoped for. Sophie goes wedding dress shopping. Sam and Citra realize their families don't support their upcoming marriage.
131	16	"With This Ring I Thee Wed"	February 4, 2024
Anali debates calling off the wedding with Clayton. Jasmine doesn't want to share her big day with Gino's family. Ashley spirals as a hurricane threatens their beach ceremony. Sam converts for Citra. Sophie breaks down when Rob refuses to apologize.
132	17	"You May Now Kiss the Bride"	February 16, 2024
It's finally wedding day for Gino and Jasmine. Clayton worries Anali won't show up at the altar. Citra's dad rejects Sam and Citra's Christian ceremony. Nikki hopes she can trust Justin as she departs Moldova. Sophie is tired of Rob and her mom's fights.
133	18	"Happily Ever Afters"	February 23, 2024
Rob worries when Sophie disappears on her way to the altar. Nikki gets a heartbreaking text from Justin. Ashley panics as a hurricane threatens her beach wedding. Anali makes a final decision about Clayton. Sam and Citra spend their wedding night apart.
134	19	"Tell All, Part 1"	March 3, 2024
Shaun Robinson welcomes the couples to NYC where they will dig deeper into their issues. Nikki and Justin give an update on where they stand. Ashley's mom reveals if she trusts Manuel's intentions. A dancer from the night of Gino's bachelor party joins the conversation, causing Jasmine to explode.
135	20	"Tell All, Part 2"	March 10, 2024
Jasmine reveals that she received a shocking letter along with panties. Sam gives an update on his legal situation. The cast goes after Justin for his hurtful comments to Nikki, and their fate is decided.

=== Season 11 (2025) ===
No. overall	No. in season	Title	Original release date
136	1	"I Love You...And You"	February 16, 2025
Matt and Amani consider divorce to bring their fiance to the US. Stevi tells her dad she's engaged and her fiance arrives tomorrow. Mark's daughter sees red flags with his younger fiance. Jessica worries if Juan will be happy with rural family life. Sarper's behavior rattles Shekinah.
137	2	"Love At First Flight"	February 23, 2025
Greg's mom doesn't want his fianceé sleeping in his bedroom. Mina's excitement dwindles when she sees Mark's rural bachelor pad. Sarper reveals the results of his interview. Mahdi worries he's made a mistake. Juan gets a reality check.
138	3	"Between Love And Madness"	March 2, 2025
Things get heated with Mark and Mina when she calls his daughter a snake. Joan arrives to the US to learn about Lucille's sleeping arrangements. Sarper gives a tear-filled goodbye to his close-knit family. Amani and Matt head to Mexico to complete their throuple.
139	4	"Love Is An Absence of Judgement"	March 9, 2025
Megin finally draws the truth out of Juan. Mahdi is shocked by Stevi's home decor. Mina meets Mark's community of retirees. Joan worries when Greg turns down a job. Alliya heads to her final interview. The throuple reunites in Mexico.
140	5	"Love Is Not Enough"	March 16, 2025
Mina and Mark's daughter, Jordan, have a heated reunion. Any reveals that she slept with Matt while Amani was asleep. Stevi's skeptical dad meets Mahdi with hard questions. Juan learns Jess met up with her ex. Sarper arrives in America.
141	6	"Love Me Or Leave Me"	March 23, 2025
Sarper lives out his Baywatch dream. Mahdi reveals that he'd stay in the US if he and Stevi broke up. Alliya confronts Shawn about being monogamous. The throuple establishes new rules for their relationship. Joan meets Greg's friends.
142	7	"The Price Of Love"	March 30, 2025
Shekinah's friend Dan thinks he is better for her than Sarper. Mark's family questions Mina's intentions. Joan's family demands the dowry be paid or there won't be a marriage. Alliya confronts Shawn about bringing up the past and using her old name.
143	8	"Love, Sweat, And Tears"	April 6, 2025
Sarper's fate hangs in Shekinah's daughter's hands. Megin refuses to forgive Juan's indiscretions. Alliya rejects limits to her surgical transformations. Stevi is wary of Mahdi's ask to rush the wedding. Mark fails to defend Mina. Any reveals a secret to Amani.
144	9	"How Deep Is Your Love?"	April 13, 2025
The first meeting of Sarper and Sofie goes off the deep end. Joan gives Greg an ultimatum. Shawn still hasn't told his kids about Alliya. Stevi's dad gives final say on marrying Mahdi. Mina learns about Mark's ex. Matt and Amani weigh their future with Any.
145	10	"Where Did Our Love Go?"	April 20, 2025
Mina meets up with Mark's ex. Amani confesses to Matt that Any loves her more. Joan offends Greg's mom. Sarper and Shekinah arrive in Montana to meet her sisters. Juan struggles with dad duties. Mahdi has a surprise for Stevi.
146	11	"Love's True Colors"	April 27, 2025
Alliya finally meets Shawn's family; Mahdi finds out that Stevi has painted her friend Claire nude; Lucille takes over wedding plans for Greg and Joan; Matt worries about his connection with Any; Sarper is ready to give up.
147	12	"Blinded by Love"	May 4, 2025
Amani reaches out to Any's ex; Shekinah wavers on getting married; Mahdi worries Stevi is hiding more secrets; Mina joins Martini Pat for a stitch and bitch; Greg takes Joan to the Big Apple; Alliya discusses major changes with a doctor.
148	13	"Love by Any Other Name"	May 11, 2025
Any's ex, Rey, drops a bombshell about her past. Jess is furious when Juan brings up cruise life at their bachelor party. Shekinah and Sarper reveal they won't have a wedding. Mina has a condition for the prenup. Saeed grills Stevi.
149	14	"All's Fair in Love and War"	May 18, 2025
Mahdi walks out of his bachelor party. Joan excludes Lucille from her dress fitting. Sarper squares off with Dan. Shawn has doubts about his future with Alliya. Matt and Amani feel betrayed by Any's lies. Mina reunites with her sister.
150	15	"Proof of Love"	May 25, 2025
Juan chooses between his family and the cruise life. Matt and Amani finally get the truth from Any. Sarper has a shocking clause to the prenup. Stevi is in tears on the eve of her wedding. Shawn and Alliya's wedding hangs in the balance. Joan and Lucille hit the strip club.
151	16	"Love on the Line"	June 1, 2025
Shawn and Alliya's wedding day is derailed by unforeseen circumstances. Any comes clean to her family. Greg panics over a scheduling disaster. Jess is blindsided by Juan's last-minute demands. Sarper goes missing. Mina gets devastating news.

=== Season 12 (2026) ===
No. overall	No. in season	Title	Original release date
152	1	"In My Getting Married Era"	May 10, 2026
153	2	"Trusting the Process"	May 17, 2026
154	3	"I Manifested You"	May 24, 2026
155	4	"Forsaking All Others"	May 31, 2026
156	5	"Something Old, Something New"	June 7, 2026
157	6	"When Two Worlds Collide"	June 14, 2026
158	7	"The Ball and Chain"	June 21, 2026
159	8	"Love Is a Work in Progress"	June 28, 2026
160	9	"Actions Louder Than Words"	July 5, 2026
161	10	"I'm Questioning Everything"	July 12, 2026
162	11	"Meeting the Family"	July 19, 2026
163	12	"So Help Me God"	July 26, 2026
164	13	"Do I Stay or Do I Go?"	August 2, 2026
165	14	"On Borrowed Time"	August 9, 2026
166	15	"It's Better to Bend Than Break"	August 16, 2026

== Cast ==
=== Season 1 ===
Couple	Individuals	Story	Outcome	Ref
Russ & Paola	Russ Mayfield, 27; Owasso, Oklahoma	Russ was an engineer but gave up his job shortly after marrying. Paola moved to Miami to seek more opportunities for modeling and to become a personal trainer for the larger Latino community. Russ initially remained in Oklahoma City but eventually joined her in Miami, where he became concerned about Paola's skimpy modeling outfits. Paola advanced to the second round of Maxim's Finest in 2017 but was eliminated.	They have one son, born in January 2019. As of April 2021, Paola has dual citizenship.	
Russ & Paola	Paola, 26; Bucaramanga, Santander, Colombia	Russ was an engineer but gave up his job shortly after marrying. Paola moved to Miami to seek more opportunities for modeling and to become a personal trainer for the larger Latino community. Russ initially remained in Oklahoma City but eventually joined her in Miami, where he became concerned about Paola's skimpy modeling outfits. Paola advanced to the second round of Maxim's Finest in 2017 but was eliminated.	They have one son, born in January 2019. As of April 2021, Paola has dual citizenship.	
Alan & Kirlyam	Alan Cox, 29; Los Angeles, California	Alan and Kirlyam met while Alan was on a missionary trip in her hometown; she then returned with him to the United States to marry. Kirlyam tried modeling but Alan raised concerns about modeling being against his Mormon values. They were married in a Mormon temple while Kirlyam's family, unable to attend, watched via livestream. They went to Hawaii for their honeymoon.	Despite being briefly separated during the COVID-19 pandemic, during which Kirlyam was stuck in Brazil visiting family, the couple is still married. They have two sons, born in October 2017 and June 2021.	
Alan & Kirlyam	Kirlyam, 21; Goiânia, Goiás, Brazil	Alan and Kirlyam met while Alan was on a missionary trip in her hometown; she then returned with him to the United States to marry. Kirlyam tried modeling but Alan raised concerns about modeling being against his Mormon values. They were married in a Mormon temple while Kirlyam's family, unable to attend, watched via livestream. They went to Hawaii for their honeymoon.	Despite being briefly separated during the COVID-19 pandemic, during which Kirlyam was stuck in Brazil visiting family, the couple is still married. They have two sons, born in October 2017 and June 2021.	
Louis & Aya	Louis Roy Gattone Jr., 37; Indianapolis, Indiana	Louis and Aya met via an online dating service. Aya wanted Louis to move to the Philippines but they decided she would move to the United States because he had two young sons, born in 2003 and 2006. The two married in a Catholic church.	The couple has two sons, born in 2018 and 2020 respectively.	
Louis & Aya	Aya, 33; Ormoc, Leyte, Eastern Visayas, Philippines	Louis and Aya met via an online dating service. Aya wanted Louis to move to the Philippines but they decided she would move to the United States because he had two young sons, born in 2003 and 2006. The two married in a Catholic church.	The couple has two sons, born in 2018 and 2020 respectively.	
Mike & Aziza	Mike Eloshway, 31; Cleveland, Ohio	Mike and Aziza met on a language acquisition website and Aziza moved to the United States in 2013 to live with Mike. Her family was unable to attend the wedding but they traveled to Russia afterward to see them.	They are still married as of 2022 and have one daughter, born in 2019. In June 2023, Mike was indicted on felony child pornography charges.	
Mike & Aziza	Aziza, 21; Volgograd, Volgograd Oblast, Russia	Mike and Aziza met on a language acquisition website and Aziza moved to the United States in 2013 to live with Mike. Her family was unable to attend the wedding but they traveled to Russia afterward to see them.	They are still married as of 2022 and have one daughter, born in 2019. In June 2023, Mike was indicted on felony child pornography charges.	

=== Season 2 ===
Couple	Individuals	Story	Outcome	Ref
Chelsea & Yamir	Chelsea Macek, 25; Galesburg, Illinois	Chelsea and Yamir met while she was volunteering in Nicaragua. Despite being part of a band in Nicaragua, he moved to the United States with Chelsea and her parents, who were supportive of the relationship. Yamir met music producers in Chicago and they encouraged him to move to the city for better opportunities. Chelsea was hesitant because neither of them was employed and lived with her parents for free. Yamir was eventually able to return to music and Chelsea played the love interest in the music video for his song "Party Love." Chelsea became an elementary school teacher.	The couple filed for divorce in 2017. As of 2020, Yamir is living in Chicago and working on his music. Chelsea married her second husband Daniel in April 2021.	
Chelsea & Yamir	Yamir Castillo, 28; Managua City, Managua, Nicaragua		The couple filed for divorce in 2017. As of 2020, Yamir is living in Chicago and working on his music. Chelsea married her second husband Daniel in April 2021.	
Danielle & Mohamed	Danielle Mullins, 41; Norwalk, Ohio	Danielle and Mohamed met in an online chatroom and Mohamed moved to Ohio after they were engaged. Danielle had three teenage daughters and an adult son from a previous relationship. She later found out that Mohamed did not have a job as he claimed, and he found out she had been passing bad checks and using someone else's credit card fraudulently.	Shortly after the wedding, Mohamed left for Florida to live with a female friend. After Danielle saw intimate photos of them online, she filed an annulment, which would see Mohamed deported if it was granted. The judge stated that it would be difficult for Danielle to win and her lawyer advised her to withdraw the annulment. In 2017, Mohamed moved to Texas while Danielle continued to try to get him deported. In 2021, Screen Rant wrote that the two speak on the phone twice a week. Danielle appeared on the spin-off series 90 Day: The Single Life. Mohamed is married to his second wife Jillian and they have two children together as of 2026.	
Danielle & Mohamed	Mohamed Jbali, 26; Tunis City, Tunis, Tunisia	Danielle and Mohamed met in an online chatroom and Mohamed moved to Ohio after they were engaged. Danielle had three teenage daughters and an adult son from a previous relationship. She later found out that Mohamed did not have a job as he claimed, and he found out she had been passing bad checks and using someone else's credit card fraudulently.		
Justin & Evelin	Justin Halas, 34; San Jose, California	Justin, a PE teacher, and Evelin, a dance instructor, met at the 2013 World Games in Colombia at a rugby match. They spent the following week together and fell in love but after their first night together, Justin told her to vacuum and clean the dishes while he watched football. Justin did not tell his family about Evelin until they were engaged, which concerned some of his relatives. Despite this, Evelin became close with Justin's family, especially his mom.	Evelin changed the spelling of her name to Evelyn. They welcomed their first child, a son, in 2020.	
Justin & Evelin	Evelin, 29; Cali, Valle del Cauca, Colombia	Justin, a PE teacher, and Evelin, a dance instructor, met at the 2013 World Games in Colombia at a rugby match. They spent the following week together and fell in love but after their first night together, Justin told her to vacuum and clean the dishes while he watched football. Justin did not tell his family about Evelin until they were engaged, which concerned some of his relatives. Despite this, Evelin became close with Justin's family, especially his mom.	Evelin changed the spelling of her name to Evelyn. They welcomed their first child, a son, in 2020.	
Brett & Daya	Brett Otto, 31; Snohomish, Washington	Brett and Daya met on an international online dating service. After Daya moved to the United States, the two lived in an apartment with Brett's two roommates but eventually found their place. He has a daughter from a previous marriage. They married on February 14, 2015. Brett's mother chose not to attend.	The couple has a daughter, born in 2017.	
Brett & Daya	Daya De Arce, 29; San Carlos, Pangasinan, Philippines	Brett and Daya met on an international online dating service. After Daya moved to the United States, the two lived in an apartment with Brett's two roommates but eventually found their place. He has a daughter from a previous marriage. They married on February 14, 2015. Brett's mother chose not to attend.	The couple has a daughter, born in 2017.	
Jason & Cássia	Jason Hitch, 38; Spring Hill, Florida	Jason, an Army veteran, met Cássia on Facebook while Cássia was in an online relationship with his friend. They later dated and Cássia moved to the United States to live with Jason and his father. He lived frugally; he resold secondhand items online and started a mail-order snack business called Gifting Fun, which surprised her.	The couple separated in 2017 and divorced in 2018 after Jason was charged with domestic violence. Cássia remarried in 2021. She's living in Europe as of 2026. Jason died of COVID-19 in 2021 at age 45.	
Jason & Cássia	Cássia Tavares, 23; Curitiba, Paraná, Brazil	Jason, an Army veteran, met Cássia on Facebook while Cássia was in an online relationship with his friend. They later dated and Cássia moved to the United States to live with Jason and his father. He lived frugally; he resold secondhand items online and started a mail-order snack business called Gifting Fun, which surprised her.	The couple separated in 2017 and divorced in 2018 after Jason was charged with domestic violence. Cássia remarried in 2021. She's living in Europe as of 2026. Jason died of COVID-19 in 2021 at age 45.	
Danny & Amy	Danny Frishmuth, 23; Norristown, Pennsylvania	Danny and Amy met in Australia while both were on a mission trip. After becoming engaged, Amy moved to the United States, where she lived with Danny's brother in respect of Danny's wishes to wait until marriage to have sex. Danny's father initially objected to the marriage (because Amy is not white), but eventually accepted her. The couple married in 2014.	After marrying, they moved to Texas. They have one son and three daughters as of 2026.	
Danny & Amy	Amy, 21; Cape Town, Western Cape, South Africa	Danny and Amy met in Australia while both were on a mission trip. After becoming engaged, Amy moved to the United States, where she lived with Danny's brother in respect of Danny's wishes to wait until marriage to have sex. Danny's father initially objected to the marriage (because Amy is not white), but eventually accepted her. The couple married in 2014.	After marrying, they moved to Texas. They have one son and three daughters as of 2026.	

=== Season 3 ===
Couple	Individuals	Story	Outcome	Ref
Mark & Nikki	Mark Shoemaker, 57; Baltimore, Maryland	Mark and Nikki met via an online dating service, and Mark proposed shortly after. Nikki is from Danao, Cebu, on the same island as Mark's ex-wife, with whom he has four children, all older than Nikki. Mark's daughter Elise, who is one year older than Nikki, felt uncomfortable with the relationship. Before the application for a visa, Mark insisted Nikki would sign a prenup and the production company had them play out scripted scenes several times throughout the production right up to the wedding day. The couple sued TLC for broken written promises which they claimed did not conflict with the contract presented afterward, including that the "show is a documentary, not scripted, not staged, filmed as it happens" filmed in "real-time" and "you are not forced to do or say anything." The lawsuit was eventually dismissed.	Mark filed for divorce from Nikki in March 2025. Their divorce was finalized in July 2025.	
Mark & Nikki	Nikki Mediano, 19; Danao, Cebu, Philippines		Mark filed for divorce from Nikki in March 2025. Their divorce was finalized in July 2025.	
Loren & Alexei	Loren Goldstone, 27; New York City, New York	Loren and Alexei met while she was visiting Israel on birthright and he was working as a medic. The couple married in both the United States and Israel.	The couple live in Fort Lauderdale, Florida with their two sons and one daughter, born in 2020, 2021, and 2022.	
Loren & Alexei	Alexei Brovarnik, 27; Nazareth Illit, Northern District, Israel (originally from Ukraine)	Loren and Alexei met while she was visiting Israel on birthright and he was working as a medic. The couple married in both the United States and Israel.	The couple live in Fort Lauderdale, Florida with their two sons and one daughter, born in 2020, 2021, and 2022.	
Kyle & Noon	Kyle Huckabee, 28; New Orleans, Louisiana	Kyle and Noon met on Facebook while he was researching for a trip to Thailand. After meeting in person, Noon moved to the United States and lived with Kyle and his roommate. Kyle proposed during a parachuting trip. They married in a Buddhist temple; Noon's family was unable to attend and Kyle's mom, who had been estranged until Noon encouraged Kyle to reconnect with her, chose not to attend.	They are still together and live in Portland, Oregon. Noon works as a cat groomer. Kyle works as a realtor.	
Kyle & Noon	Bajaree "Noon" Boonma, 25; Bangkok, Thailand	Kyle and Noon met on Facebook while he was researching for a trip to Thailand. After meeting in person, Noon moved to the United States and lived with Kyle and his roommate. Kyle proposed during a parachuting trip. They married in a Buddhist temple; Noon's family was unable to attend and Kyle's mom, who had been estranged until Noon encouraged Kyle to reconnect with her, chose not to attend.	They are still together and live in Portland, Oregon. Noon works as a cat groomer. Kyle works as a realtor.	
Melanie & Devar	Melanie Bowers, 33; Orwigsburg, Pennsylvania	Melanie and Devar met while Melanie was on vacation at the resort in Jamaica where Devar worked as a lifeguard. He proposed within days of meeting her and moved to the United States, where Melanie had custody of her son on weekends. Her sister was concerned about the sudden relationship and Melanie agreed to look into a prenup after Devar mentioned wanting to send most of his income to his family in Jamaica.	Melanie and Devar are still together. The couple has a daughter, born in 2017.	
Melanie & Devar	Devar Walters, 28; Runaway Bay, Jamaica	Melanie and Devar met while Melanie was on vacation at the resort in Jamaica where Devar worked as a lifeguard. He proposed within days of meeting her and moved to the United States, where Melanie had custody of her son on weekends. Her sister was concerned about the sudden relationship and Melanie agreed to look into a prenup after Devar mentioned wanting to send most of his income to his family in Jamaica.	Melanie and Devar are still together. The couple has a daughter, born in 2017.	
Fernando & Carolina	Fernando Verdini, 39; Doral, Florida	Fernando and Carolina met in Colombia while both on dates with other people and were engaged before he returned to Florida. His parents lived with him in the house he owned from a previous marriage. When Carolina moved to the United States, his mom made racist comments about Colombians; they married despite this. Following the wedding, Carolina admitted to calling her mom three times a day and missing her cat, which she could not bring because Fernando is allergic.	They are still together. They had their first child, in September 2025.	
Fernando & Carolina	Carolina, 22; Medellín, Colombia	Fernando and Carolina met in Colombia while both on dates with other people and were engaged before he returned to Florida. His parents lived with him in the house he owned from a previous marriage. When Carolina moved to the United States, his mom made racist comments about Colombians; they married despite this. Following the wedding, Carolina admitted to calling her mom three times a day and missing her cat, which she could not bring because Fernando is allergic.	They are still together. They had their first child, in September 2025.	
Josh & Aleksandra	Josh Strobel, 22; Rexburg, Idaho	Josh and Aleksandra met in Prague while Josh was on a missionary trip and Aleksandra was attending university. She worked as a go-go dancer at a club and enjoyed drinking and partying but later converted to Mormonism with Josh's support. They stayed in touch after his trip and began dating, and he traveled to Russia in 2015 to propose. They married the same year shortly after she moved to the United States.	Josh began attending medical school in Queensland, Australia in 2018 and the family moved to Brisbane. He transferred to a university in New Orleans, Louisiana in 2020. Josh got his medical degree in 2021 and started residency in Shreveport, Louisiana in 2022. Aleksandra got a bachelor's degree from a US university and now is in Nursing School. They have two children.	
Josh & Aleksandra	Aleksandra Iarovikova, 21; Kirov, Russia	Josh and Aleksandra met in Prague while Josh was on a missionary trip and Aleksandra was attending university. She worked as a go-go dancer at a club and enjoyed drinking and partying but later converted to Mormonism with Josh's support. They stayed in touch after his trip and began dating, and he traveled to Russia in 2015 to propose. They married the same year shortly after she moved to the United States.	Josh began attending medical school in Queensland, Australia in 2018 and the family moved to Brisbane. He transferred to a university in New Orleans, Louisiana in 2020. Josh got his medical degree in 2021 and started residency in Shreveport, Louisiana in 2022. Aleksandra got a bachelor's degree from a US university and now is in Nursing School. They have two children.	

=== Season 4 ===
Couple	Individuals	Story	Outcome	Ref
Jorge & Anfisa	Jorge Nava, 27; Riverside, California	Jorge contacted Anfisa on Facebook after seeing her photos and although she was at first hesitant to about his messages, she agreed to meet. They then took an expensive European vacation. Before coming to the United States, Anfisa asked Jorge for a $10,000 handbag; when he declined, she erased his cell phone and canceled the flights. They later reconciled. Jorge pleaded guilty to marijuana trafficking, which made it difficult to rent an apartment, and had been the victim of a break-in and was afraid to settle in one place, so he had been living out of hotels, which Anfisa was unimpressed with. They eventually moved into a small apartment. Jorge did not buy an engagement ring or wedding dress for Anfisa, which concerned his family and caused them to question Anfisa's motives. She admitted she was interested in Jorge providing for her but that Jorge was interested in her because of her looks. She considered returning to Russia and he considered not trying to stop her but they ended up marrying alone in a simple courthouse ceremony, with Jorge promising a ring and a bigger ceremony in the future.	The couple is divorced. In 2018, Jorge was arrested for trafficking marijuana and was sentenced to 2.5 years in prison. He was released in 2020. In 2021 he welcomed his first child, a daughter with his girlfriend, Rhoda Blua. Almost a year later, the couple welcomed their second child together. In August 2022, Jorge and Rhoda married in an intimate ceremony in Las Vegas. Anfisa, started working as a bodybuilder before earning a Bachelor's in Business Administration from UC Irvine. Anfisa returned to reality television in 2023, appearing in season 1 of House of Villains. She is now engaged.	
Jorge & Anfisa	Anfisa Arkhipchenko, 20; Moscow, Russia			
Nicole & Azan	Nicole Nafziger, 22; Bradenton, Florida	Nicole and Azan met via a dating app. Nicole left her toddler with her parents so she could visit Azan in Morocco for five weeks, which her family was unsure of. Upon meeting, Azan remarked that she was "big... a little bit" but was happy to see her regardless. She attempted to hug and kiss him and he told her it is not acceptable in Islamic culture for unmarried couples to be affectionate. Though she was warmly welcomed by his family, she felt unsure of their relationship and continued to struggle with Islamic customs. She later revealed she cheated on Azan. Despite this, he proposed to her in the desert. Their wedding was delayed as Nicole did not have enough money to sponsor Azan's visa and her mother did not want to be a co-sponsor. They remained together but lived in separate countries. In 2017, Nicole's father agreed to sponsor Azan.	The couple is featured again in season 5.	
Nicole & Azan	Azan Tefou, 24; Agadir, Morocco		The couple is featured again in season 5.	
Narkyia & Olulowo	Narkyia Lathan, 36; Camp Hill, Pennsylvania	Narkyia and Olulowo met on an online dating site for plus-sized women. Still, they ran into issues when trying to meet for the first time, in large part because Lowo lied about where he lived and about his son's mother's death. Narkyia and her friends and family were skeptical and wondered if the relationship was a romance scam but he never asked for money. She eventually went to Vietnam, where he previously lived, to meet and help gather documents for his visa. They broke up when she learned he had been trying to rekindle his relationship with his son's mother at the same time they began talking.	Though they were angry with each other at the end of the season, they later married and live in the United States with their daughter, born in 2020.	
Narkyia & Olulowo	Olulowo "Lowo" Shodipe, 28; Lagos, Nigeria		Though they were angry with each other at the end of the season, they later married and live in the United States with their daughter, born in 2020.	
Matt & Alla	Matt Ryan, 43; Williamstown, Kentucky	Matt and Alla met on a dating website several years before but lost touch after Matt married his third wife. They reconnected after both going through a divorce. Alla was overwhelmed by Matt's friends and family and was encouraged to scale back on her dream wedding. They were eventually married.	The couple has a daughter, born in 2020, and a son, born in 2022.	
Matt & Alla	Alla Fedoruk, 30; Kyiv, Ukraine	Matt and Alla met on a dating website several years before but lost touch after Matt married his third wife. They reconnected after both going through a divorce. Alla was overwhelmed by Matt's friends and family and was encouraged to scale back on her dream wedding. They were eventually married.	The couple has a daughter, born in 2020, and a son, born in 2022.	
Chantel & Pedro	CeAir "Chantel" Everett, 25; Atlanta, Georgia	Chantel and Pedro met when she visited the Dominican Republic and were introduced by a Spanish teacher. She visited him often; after he proposed, she worried her family would think he was marrying her for a green card, so she told her parents he was on a student travel visa. They married in both the United States and the Dominican Republic, though their second wedding saw significant conflict. Pedro's family expected him to send them money now that he lived in the US, so Pedro and Chantel lived modestly. Both families struggled with cultural differences.	In 2019, The Family Chantel began airing on TLC. In 2022, it was confirmed they had filed for divorce. Chantel has since appeared on 90 Day: The Single Life and Hunt For Love. On Hunt for Love, Chantel revealed that she is attracted to women, and that her friend, Ashley Bowen, admitted she had feelings for her prior to the season. After the season wrapped, Chantel and Ashley began dating. In September 2025, Chantel and Ashley got engaged. Pedro now works as a real estate agent. Pedro proposed to his girlfriend Valentina in Hawaii and they are engaged as of July 2026. Chantel and Ashley married in October 2026.	
Chantel & Pedro	Pedro Jimeno, 24; Santo Domingo, Dominican Republic			

=== Season 5 ===
Couple	Individuals	Story	Outcome	Ref
Elizabeth & Andrei	Elizabeth Potthast, 27; Tampa, Florida	The couple met when Elizabeth visited Dublin, where Andrei lived at a time. Her family expressed concerns about him being too controlling and her father refused to financially support them. They married earlier than planned so Andrei could begin working. They fought when Elizabeth and her sisters went to Miami for her bachelorette party and went clubbing against Andrei's wishes.	The couple's first child was born in 2019, and they welcomed their second child in 2022. In November 2025, Elizabeth's father, Chuck, passed away. The couple revealed the news in a joint Instagram post.	
Elizabeth & Andrei	Andrei Castravet, 31; Chișinău, Moldova	The couple met when Elizabeth visited Dublin, where Andrei lived at a time. Her family expressed concerns about him being too controlling and her father refused to financially support them. They married earlier than planned so Andrei could begin working. They fought when Elizabeth and her sisters went to Miami for her bachelorette party and went clubbing against Andrei's wishes.	The couple's first child was born in 2019, and they welcomed their second child in 2022. In November 2025, Elizabeth's father, Chuck, passed away. The couple revealed the news in a joint Instagram post.	
Evelyn & David	Evelyn Cormier, 18; Claremont, New Hampshire	The couple met after David saw Evelyn's band's Facebook page and contacted her. They are both from religious Christian families and David refused to discuss sex with Evelyn on camera. They struggled with her refusal to compromise on their wedding and he objected to living in a small town. Despite this, they married and lived in her hometown of Claremont.	Evelyn reached the Top 14 of American Idol in 2019 and the couple moved to Los Angeles. In 2021, they announced they have divorced. Evelyn married her second husband in August 2024 and they had a daughter, in June 2026.	
Evelyn & David	David Vázquez Zermeño, 27; Granada, Spain	The couple met after David saw Evelyn's band's Facebook page and contacted her. They are both from religious Christian families and David refused to discuss sex with Evelyn on camera. They struggled with her refusal to compromise on their wedding and he objected to living in a small town. Despite this, they married and lived in her hometown of Claremont.	Evelyn reached the Top 14 of American Idol in 2019 and the couple moved to Los Angeles. In 2021, they announced they have divorced. Evelyn married her second husband in August 2024 and they had a daughter, in June 2026.	
Molly & Luis	Molly Hopkins, 41; Woodstock, Georgia	Molly and Luis met when she and her friends visited the bar he worked at while on a trip to the Dominican Republic. Molly's oldest daughter was opposed to Luis moving in with them and Molly's father questioned his intentions. He did not get along with either of Molly's daughters and was uninterested in being a stepfather. He was generally bored and unsatisfied with life in Georgia and he and Molly argued about his disinterest in wedding planning and about him asking Molly's daughter about her sex life. Luis left Molly but later returned for the final episode.	Six months after their wedding, Molly filed for divorce. Luis accused her of being emotionally and physically abusive during their short marriage. Molly later dated Kelly Brown, a retired police officer from Brooklyn. The two appeared together on 90 Day: The Single Life and The Last Resort. Molly and Kelly have since split.	
Molly & Luis	Luis Mendez, 26; Dominican Republic		Six months after their wedding, Molly filed for divorce. Luis accused her of being emotionally and physically abusive during their short marriage. Molly later dated Kelly Brown, a retired police officer from Brooklyn. The two appeared together on 90 Day: The Single Life and The Last Resort. Molly and Kelly have since split.	
David & Annie	David Toborowsky, 48; Louisville, Kentucky	David and Annie met in a bar while he was living in Thailand. David had no money and relied on financial support from his best friend, former football player Chris Thieneman, who sponsored Annie's visa and gave David enough money to pay Annie's parents a bride price. In the United States, they lived with Chris and his wife in Los Angeles until she, frustrated with her husband's financial support of David, asked them to return to Louisville. David's children reacted negatively to the relationship. Despite David's past infidelity, drinking problems, and unemployment, they married.	As of 2022, they live in Fountain Hills, Arizona. In March 2025, the couple welcomed a baby girl. As of 2026 they live in Thailand.	
David & Annie	Annie Suwan, 24; Bueng Kan, Thailand		As of 2022, they live in Fountain Hills, Arizona. In March 2025, the couple welcomed a baby girl. As of 2026 they live in Thailand.	
Josh & Aika	Josh Batterson, 43; Mesa, Arizona	Josh and Aika met on a dating app and became engaged when Josh went to the Philippines to meet her. While Aika enjoyed living in the United States, she and Josh faced conflict when he pressured her to pursue modeling and she pushed for him to reverse the vasectomy he had gotten after having two children with his first wife. They married in Las Vegas.	They are still married after having tied the knot in Vegas in September 2017. In a November 2022 Instagram comment, they said they were thinking about children in the future, having frozen their eggs, per Screen Rant.	
Josh & Aika	Aika, 36; Quezon City, Philippines	Josh and Aika met on a dating app and became engaged when Josh went to the Philippines to meet her. While Aika enjoyed living in the United States, she and Josh faced conflict when he pressured her to pursue modeling and she pushed for him to reverse the vasectomy he had gotten after having two children with his first wife. They married in Las Vegas.	They are still married after having tied the knot in Vegas in September 2017. In a November 2022 Instagram comment, they said they were thinking about children in the future, having frozen their eggs, per Screen Rant.	
Nicole & Azan	Nicole Nafziger, 23; Bradenton, Florida	Nicole and Azan originally appeared in season 4. Nicole's father and stepmother agreed to co-sponsor Azan's visa. Nicole flew to Morocco with her two-and-a-half-year-old daughter to visit Azan. The couple continued to argue about lifestyle differences and Azan still did not trust Nicole after she cheated on him previously. Azan was unemployed and had received about $6,000 from Nicole, who said she did not mind helping him and preferred he be available to talk over the phone than be busy working. During the reunion episode, Nicole was unable to get in contact with Azan; it was later revealed he had been arrested for unrelated reasons.	In March 2020, Nicole flew to Morocco to visit Azan but was stuck there for five months due to travel bans stemming from the COVID-19 pandemic. In 2021, she confirmed they had split.	
Nicole & Azan	Azan Tefou, 25; Agadir, Morocco		In March 2020, Nicole flew to Morocco to visit Azan but was stuck there for five months due to travel bans stemming from the COVID-19 pandemic. In 2021, she confirmed they had split.	

=== Season 6 ===
Couple	Individuals	Story	Outcome	Ref
Ashley & Jay	Ashley Martson, 31; Mechanicsburg, Pennsylvania	Ashley and Jay met while she was staying at a resort in Jamaica for a friend's wedding. They stayed in touch on social media after her trip and he proposed when she returned to visit six months later. They initially planned to marry in Pennsylvania but due to racist comments on their wedding website, they married in Las Vegas instead. When they returned, Ashley found Jay had an active Tinder account and filed for divorce in 2019.	Though they reconciled and got back together, they separated again in 2020 and finalized their divorce in 2021.	
Ashley & Jay	Jay Smith, 20; Port Maria, Jamaica	Ashley and Jay met while she was staying at a resort in Jamaica for a friend's wedding. They stayed in touch on social media after her trip and he proposed when she returned to visit six months later. They initially planned to marry in Pennsylvania but due to racist comments on their wedding website, they married in Las Vegas instead. When they returned, Ashley found Jay had an active Tinder account and filed for divorce in 2019.	Though they reconciled and got back together, they separated again in 2020 and finalized their divorce in 2021.	
Colt & Larissa	Colt Johnson, 33; Las Vegas, Nevada	Colt and Larissa met on a dating website. He flew to Mexico to spend five days with her, then flew to Rio de Janeiro to spend six more days together. He proposed after five days. She moved with him to Las Vegas and they married in the summer of 2018.	In 2019, Larissa was charged with misdemeanor domestic violence and Colt subsequently filed for divorce. Colt later married longtime friend, Vanessa. Colt and Vanessa are now divorced. Colt soon after lost his job and became homeless. He appeared on 90 Day: Hunt For Love, where he met fellow cast member and Before the 90 Days Alumn, Courtney Reardanz. The two began dating and Colt moved to Florida to live with Courtney and her parents. The couple would appear on 90 Day: The Single Life together. Colt and Courtney would eventually break up after Courtney caught him talking to a Brazilian woman online.	
Colt & Larissa	Larissa dos Santos Lima, 31; Minas Gerais, Brazil	Colt and Larissa met on a dating website. He flew to Mexico to spend five days with her, then flew to Rio de Janeiro to spend six more days together. He proposed after five days. She moved with him to Las Vegas and they married in the summer of 2018.		
Jonathan & Fernanda	Jonathan Rivera, 32; Lumberton, North Carolina	Jonathan and Fernanda met while he was vacationing in Mexico. They married in May 2018.	In January 2019, they announced they had not spoken since December 2018. In March, Jonathan announced he had canceled her green card paperwork. Their divorce was finalized in 2020. Fernanda moved to Chicago, and later on to Miami. Fernanda now lives in New York City as of 2025, where she works as a model and influencer. Jonathan has since remarried and is now a father to two kids.	
Jonathan & Fernanda	Fernanda Flores, 19; Celaya, Mexico	Jonathan and Fernanda met while he was vacationing in Mexico. They married in May 2018.	In January 2019, they announced they had not spoken since December 2018. In March, Jonathan announced he had canceled her green card paperwork. Their divorce was finalized in 2020. Fernanda moved to Chicago, and later on to Miami. Fernanda now lives in New York City as of 2025, where she works as a model and influencer. Jonathan has since remarried and is now a father to two kids.	
Kalani & Asuelu	Kalani Faagata, 30; Orange County, California	Kalani and Asuelu met while she was staying at the resort in Samoa, where her dad is from, where Asuelu worked. Though she had remained celibate in line with her Mormon faith, Kalani became pregnant during her trip and gave birth to their first son in January 2018. They married in September 2018.	The couple welcomed their second son in May 2019. They are now divorced. Kalani welcomed her third child, a daughter, with her boyfriend in June 2024. Asuelu joined the US Army.	
Kalani & Asuelu	Asuelu Pulaa, 23; Samoa	Kalani and Asuelu met while she was staying at the resort in Samoa, where her dad is from, where Asuelu worked. Though she had remained celibate in line with her Mormon faith, Kalani became pregnant during her trip and gave birth to their first son in January 2018. They married in September 2018.	The couple welcomed their second son in May 2019. They are now divorced. Kalani welcomed her third child, a daughter, with her boyfriend in June 2024. Asuelu joined the US Army.	
Eric & Leida	Eric Rosenbrook, 40; Baraboo, Wisconsin	Eric and Leida met on an international dating website. She moved to Wisconsin to live with him, leaving his parents questioning why she would give up her lifestyle when she claimed to be from a wealthy family. She also said she was a medical school graduate, an actress, a model, and a teacher. They married in 2018. In one episode, she kicked Eric's teenage daughter out of the house.	In 2019, police were called to their home to investigate accusations of domestic abuse. Leida accused Eric of pulling her hair during a fight after she threatened that she was going to kill herself with a knife. That same year, Leida was granted a four-year restraining order against Eric's daughter, Tasha. In 2023, Leida was arrested for theft, forgery, and wire fraud in the business where she worked. In 2024, Eric and Leida briefly separated, with Leida filing for divorce on February 12. A few days later, Leida requested that the filing be dismissed. In May 2025, Eric and Leida welcomed their only child together, a daughter, named Alisa Eleanor Rosenbrook. On July 4, 2025, Eric was arrested after a fight with Leida. Alisa was sent to the hospital and put on life support the same day. On July 9 2025, Alisa died at the age of one month old. On March 5, 2026, officials ruled Alisa's death as non accidental, and that the newborn was physically abused by Leida. As of September 2026, Leida is being charged with 24 felony counts of theft, wire fraud, bail jumping, forgery and uttering forged documents. Eric entered a guilty plea for the two misdemeanor charges from his 2025 arrest, leading to one of the charges being dropped. Eric and Leida are separated as of 2026.	
Eric & Leida	Leida Margaretha Cohen, 29; Jakarta, Indonesia	Eric and Leida met on an international dating website. She moved to Wisconsin to live with him, leaving his parents questioning why she would give up her lifestyle when she claimed to be from a wealthy family. She also said she was a medical school graduate, an actress, a model, and a teacher. They married in 2018. In one episode, she kicked Eric's teenage daughter out of the house.		
Steven & Olga	Steven Frend, 20; Bowie, Maryland	Steven and Olga met while Olga was staying in Ocean City, Maryland on a summer work visa. After a few weeks of dating, she became pregnant. Steven traveled to Russia for the birth of their son.	The couple got married by the Maryland court system in August 2019. Steven and Olga separated after one year of marriage but later reconciled. They moved from Maryland to Brooklyn, New York and had their second child, a daughter, in 2022. In 2024, Steven announced that he and Olga were separating. The couple has since divorced. Steven now lives in Queens. Olga now works as a photographer. Following their divorce, Steven appeard on 90 Day: Hunt For Love.	
Steven & Olga	Olga Koshimbetova, 20; Voronezh, Russia	Steven and Olga met while Olga was staying in Ocean City, Maryland on a summer work visa. After a few weeks of dating, she became pregnant. Steven traveled to Russia for the birth of their son.	The couple got married by the Maryland court system in August 2019. Steven and Olga separated after one year of marriage but later reconciled. They moved from Maryland to Brooklyn, New York and had their second child, a daughter, in 2022. In 2024, Steven announced that he and Olga were separating. The couple has since divorced. Steven now lives in Queens. Olga now works as a photographer. Following their divorce, Steven appeard on 90 Day: Hunt For Love.	

=== Season 7 ===
Couple	Individuals	Story	Outcome	Ref
Emily & Sasha	Emily Larina, 29; Portland, Oregon	Emily and Sasha met after she moved to Russia to teach English and joined a gym where he worked as a personal trainer. Though he was still married when they met, Sasha and Emily maintained that they did not begin a relationship until he was separated from his ex-wife. Emily became pregnant and their son, Sasha's third, was born in November 2018. When they moved to the United States, Emily's sister was vocal about her distrust of Sasha, particularly as he continued to comment on Emily's baby weight. Regardless, they married.	Emily, Sasha, and their son moved back to Moscow. In early 2020, they returned to the United States so Sasha could meet her parents but wound up staying for longer due to the COVID-19 pandemic. After the unrest in Russia, Emily moved back to the US where she is currently living. Sasha is living in Russia. It is not known if they are still together or not.	
Emily & Sasha	Alexander "Sasha" Larin, 32; Moscow, Russia		Emily, Sasha, and their son moved back to Moscow. In early 2020, they returned to the United States so Sasha could meet her parents but wound up staying for longer due to the COVID-19 pandemic. After the unrest in Russia, Emily moved back to the US where she is currently living. Sasha is living in Russia. It is not known if they are still together or not.	
Anna & Mursel	Anna Campisi, 38; Bellevue, Nebraska	Anna and Mursel met via social media and began dating despite the language barrier. He proposed four months after she visited him in Turkey. He continued to keep her three children a secret from his family since he knew they would disapprove of her choice to have them out of wedlock. Anna eventually told him she could not marry him until he was honest with them. When he told them, they wanted him to return to Turkey. He did but returned to marry Anna within the 90-day limit.	They welcomed a son in April 2022 via surrogate from Ukraine.	
Anna & Mursel	Mursel Mistanoglu, 38; Antalya, Turkey	Anna and Mursel met via social media and began dating despite the language barrier. He proposed four months after she visited him in Turkey. He continued to keep her three children a secret from his family since he knew they would disapprove of her choice to have them out of wedlock. Anna eventually told him she could not marry him until he was honest with them. When he told them, they wanted him to return to Turkey. He did but returned to marry Anna within the 90-day limit.	They welcomed a son in April 2022 via surrogate from Ukraine.	
Michael & Juliana	Michael Jessen, 42; Greenwich, Connecticut	Michael and Juliana met at a yacht party in Croatia and immediately connected. Juliana's tourist visa to the United States was denied; this only strengthened Michael's feelings about spending their life together and he sponsored her K-1 visa. His family was concerned that Juliana was using Michael to start a new life in the US, especially because she had only seen the exciting, jet-setting part of his life. Michael's ex-wife and Juliana eventually became friends and she officiated their wedding.	Michael and Juliana separated in 2021. They are now divorced. Juliana later got pregnant and had a child with another man who she later married. However, Juliana ended up getting divorced from him.	
Michael & Juliana	Juliana Custodio, 23; Goiânia, Brazil	Michael and Juliana met at a yacht party in Croatia and immediately connected. Juliana's tourist visa to the United States was denied; this only strengthened Michael's feelings about spending their life together and he sponsored her K-1 visa. His family was concerned that Juliana was using Michael to start a new life in the US, especially because she had only seen the exciting, jet-setting part of his life. Michael's ex-wife and Juliana eventually became friends and she officiated their wedding.	Michael and Juliana separated in 2021. They are now divorced. Juliana later got pregnant and had a child with another man who she later married. However, Juliana ended up getting divorced from him.	
Tania & Syngin	Tania Maduro, 29; Colchester, Connecticut	Tania and Syngin met when she flew to South Africa to meet a man she connected with on a dating app; when the date didn't work out, she flirted with the bartender, Syngin. Tania stayed in South Africa with him for four and a half months before the couple moved to the United States. While living together in her mother's shed, they realized how different they are and questioned their future together. Tensions grew when Tania went on a business trip to Costa Rica for one month out of the allotted three months for the K-1 visa. They later married.	Tania and Syngin divorced in 2021. Syngin shared that his not wanting children were what solidified the decision. Both later appeared in separate seasons of 90 Day Fiancé: The Single Life. Syngin has been in a relationship with his girlfriend Shayna since 2022.	
Tania & Syngin	Syngin Colchester, 29; Cape Town, South Africa		Tania and Syngin divorced in 2021. Syngin shared that his not wanting children were what solidified the decision. Both later appeared in separate seasons of 90 Day Fiancé: The Single Life. Syngin has been in a relationship with his girlfriend Shayna since 2022.	
Robert & Anny	Robert Springs, 41; Winter Park, Florida	Robert and Anny met online and talked daily for months before Robert took a cruise that docked in the Dominican Republic. He proposed after spending eight hours with her. Anny was taken aback when she moved to the United States and discovered just how frugally Robert, already the father of five children, lived. Anny and the grandmother of one of Robert's sons did not get along, with Anny even being offered $15,000 to leave Robert and return home. They married regardless.	The couple welcomed their first child, a daughter, in July 2020. Their son was born in September 2021. In April 2022, Anny shared via social media that their seven-month-old son died after going under for heart surgery. In 2024, they welcomed another son.	
Robert & Anny	Anny Francisco, 31; Santiago, Dominican Republic	Robert and Anny met online and talked daily for months before Robert took a cruise that docked in the Dominican Republic. He proposed after spending eight hours with her. Anny was taken aback when she moved to the United States and discovered just how frugally Robert, already the father of five children, lived. Anny and the grandmother of one of Robert's sons did not get along, with Anny even being offered $15,000 to leave Robert and return home. They married regardless.	The couple welcomed their first child, a daughter, in July 2020. Their son was born in September 2021. In April 2022, Anny shared via social media that their seven-month-old son died after going under for heart surgery. In 2024, they welcomed another son.	
Blake & Jasmin	Blake Abelard, 29; Los Angeles, California	Blake and Jasmin met online and he proposed during his second trip to Finland to visit her. His family was suspicious of her since Jasmin's sister lived near the Abelard family on a green card and they suspected she might have been pursuing a relationship to reunite with her sister. Blake's parents did not allow the couple to live together until they were married, so Jasmin lived with them while Blake lived with his friends.	The couple separated in November 2024, with Jasmin moving to New York.	
Blake & Jasmin	Jasmin Lahtinen, 27; Helsinki, Finland	Blake and Jasmin met online and he proposed during his second trip to Finland to visit her. His family was suspicious of her since Jasmin's sister lived near the Abelard family on a green card and they suspected she might have been pursuing a relationship to reunite with her sister. Blake's parents did not allow the couple to live together until they were married, so Jasmin lived with them while Blake lived with his friends.	The couple separated in November 2024, with Jasmin moving to New York.	
Mike & Natalie	Mike Youngquist, 34; Sequim, Washington	Mike and Natalie met when they were asked by mutual friends to serve as godparents. After chatting online for a while, Mike visited Natalie in Ukraine; he later proposed to her in front of the Eiffel Tower. When Natalie's visa was delayed, the couple stayed in Kyiv, where they discovered that they had opposing views on several important issues. They were still on shaky ground when they were able to move to Mike's hometown of Sequim, Washington, where they started couples counseling.	Mike and Natalie appeared again in season 8.	
Mike & Natalie	Natalie Mordovtseva, 35; Kyiv, Ukraine	Mike and Natalie met when they were asked by mutual friends to serve as godparents. After chatting online for a while, Mike visited Natalie in Ukraine; he later proposed to her in front of the Eiffel Tower. When Natalie's visa was delayed, the couple stayed in Kyiv, where they discovered that they had opposing views on several important issues. They were still on shaky ground when they were able to move to Mike's hometown of Sequim, Washington, where they started couples counseling.	Mike and Natalie appeared again in season 8.	
Angela & Michael	Angela Deem, 53; Hazlehurst, Georgia	Angela and Michael originally appeared in seasons 2 and 3 of 90 Day Fiancé: Before the 90 Days. After breaking up at the end of season 2, they reconciled during season 3. They continued to argue despite this. When Michael's visa was denied, Angela flew to Nigeria but returned to the United States after facing pressure to marry while in Nigeria. Angela decided to re-apply for a spousal visa and they married in January 2020 in Nigeria.	Angela and Michael appeared on season 7 of 90 Day Fiancé: Happily Ever After?. Michael finally relocated in United States in late 2023. They separated in February 2024 and their divorce was finalized in March 2026. As of 2026 Michael lives in Texas.	
Angela & Michael	Michael Ilesanmi, 31; Lagos, Nigeria	Angela and Michael originally appeared in seasons 2 and 3 of 90 Day Fiancé: Before the 90 Days. After breaking up at the end of season 2, they reconciled during season 3. They continued to argue despite this. When Michael's visa was denied, Angela flew to Nigeria but returned to the United States after facing pressure to marry while in Nigeria. Angela decided to re-apply for a spousal visa and they married in January 2020 in Nigeria.	Angela and Michael appeared on season 7 of 90 Day Fiancé: Happily Ever After?. Michael finally relocated in United States in late 2023. They separated in February 2024 and their divorce was finalized in March 2026. As of 2026 Michael lives in Texas.	

=== Season 8 ===
Couple	Individuals	Story	Outcome	Ref
Andrew & Amira	Andrew Kenton, 32; Roseville, California	Andrew and Amira met on a dating website and he proposed during one of her visits to the United States. Amira received her K-1 visa in early 2020 but the COVID-19 pandemic complicated travel between France and the US. The couple planned to meet in Mexico in March 2020 to quarantine before returning to northern California to marry but Amira was detained in Mexico for three days and deported. They later decided to meet in Serbia to quarantine. While there, they argued about having children. He later sent her a text message telling her he had booked two plane tickets for her, one to France and one to the United States. Amira chose to return to France.	The couple broke up mid season.	
Andrew & Amira	Amira Lollyosa, 28; Saumur, France		The couple broke up mid season.	
Brandon & Julia	Brandon Gibbs, 27; Dinwiddie, Virginia	Brandon and Julia met online and talked for a while before agreeing to meet in Iceland, where he proposed. She accepted and they moved to live with Brandon's conservative parents on their farm in Virginia. They married in April 2020.	They are still married as of 2025. On season 9 of 90 Day Fiance: Happily Ever After? the couple revealed they were pregnant with their first child. They gave birth to a son, born in October 2025.	
Brandon & Julia	Julia Trubkina, 26; Krasnodar, Russia	Brandon and Julia met online and talked for a while before agreeing to meet in Iceland, where he proposed. She accepted and they moved to live with Brandon's conservative parents on their farm in Virginia. They married in April 2020.	They are still married as of 2025. On season 9 of 90 Day Fiance: Happily Ever After? the couple revealed they were pregnant with their first child. They gave birth to a son, born in October 2025.	
Jovi & Yara	Jovi Dufren, 29; Larose, Louisiana	Jovi and Yara met on a travel dating app; what was intended to be a one-night stand turned into a relationship where they would meet and travel together. During one of their trips, Yara became pregnant and Jovi proposed. Yara miscarried, however, Jovi kept the fiancé visa application active. Once Yara arrived in New Orleans, they lived together in the Warehouse District. Jovi's family was suspicious of Yara and made xenophobic remarks about her using Jovi for citizenship. Yara became pregnant again in the first weeks of her 90-day visa stay, and they married in Las Vegas in February 2020.	Their daughter was born in September 2020. They are still married as of 2024 and moved to Miami, Florida. Yara is now a dual citizen of the U.S and Ukraine.	
Jovi & Yara	Yara Zaya (Zalokhina), 25; Kyiv, Ukraine		Their daughter was born in September 2020. They are still married as of 2024 and moved to Miami, Florida. Yara is now a dual citizen of the U.S and Ukraine.	
Mike & Natalie	Mike Youngquist, 35; Sequim, Washington	Season 7 ended with Mike and Natalie breaking up. In season 8, they fought and showed no intention of marrying, but agreed to a date when Mike's mother came to visit. On the morning of their wedding in April 2020, three days before her visa expired, Mike called off the ceremony. She attempted to go to Seattle to fly back to Ukraine with a plane ticket Mike paid for, but ended up returning to the house. They later married.	They have since divorced. Natalie lives now in California. Mike and his girlfriend welcomed a baby girl in February 2026.	
Mike & Natalie	Natalie Mordovtseva, 35; Kyiv, Ukraine	Season 7 ended with Mike and Natalie breaking up. In season 8, they fought and showed no intention of marrying, but agreed to a date when Mike's mother came to visit. On the morning of their wedding in April 2020, three days before her visa expired, Mike called off the ceremony. She attempted to go to Seattle to fly back to Ukraine with a plane ticket Mike paid for, but ended up returning to the house. They later married.	They have since divorced. Natalie lives now in California. Mike and his girlfriend welcomed a baby girl in February 2026.	
Rebecca & Zied	Rebecca Parrott, 49; Woodstock, Georgia	Rebecca and Zied met on Facebook and first appeared on season 3 of 90 Day Fiancé: Before the 90 Days when Rebecca traveled to Tunisia to meet Zied. In season 8 of 90 Day Fiancé, Zied was granted his visa and moved to Georgia, where he received an unfriendly welcome from Rebecca's friends and family, including her adult daughter. They married in April 2020 despite Zied not wanting to marry before Ramadan.	They appeared in 90 Day Diaries season 4.	
Rebecca & Zied	Zied Hakimi, 27; Tunis, Tunisia	Rebecca and Zied met on Facebook and first appeared on season 3 of 90 Day Fiancé: Before the 90 Days when Rebecca traveled to Tunisia to meet Zied. In season 8 of 90 Day Fiancé, Zied was granted his visa and moved to Georgia, where he received an unfriendly welcome from Rebecca's friends and family, including her adult daughter. They married in April 2020 despite Zied not wanting to marry before Ramadan.	They appeared in 90 Day Diaries season 4.	
Stephanie & Ryan	Stephanie Davison, 52; Grand Rapids, Michigan	Stephanie and Ryan met while she was vacationing in Belize and stayed in touch. She visited Ryan several times afterward. During one of her trips to Belize, Stephanie discovered that Ryan was speaking to several women and she had sex with Ryan's cousin to get back at him after the ensuing fight. They reconciled and agreed to several additional visits before applying for the visa. The process was delayed by the COVID-19 pandemic and neither was able to visit the other. They eventually broke up and she pursued a romance with his cousin instead.	In 2021, Stephanie revealed that she and Ryan had broken up well before the end of filming and that the storyline with his cousin was fabricated to keep her story going. She also admitted to going on the show to drum up more business for her medspas.	
Stephanie & Ryan	Ryan Carr, 27; Ladyville, Belize		In 2021, Stephanie revealed that she and Ryan had broken up well before the end of filming and that the storyline with his cousin was fabricated to keep her story going. She also admitted to going on the show to drum up more business for her medspas.	
Tarik & Hazel	Tarik Myers, 46; Virginia Beach, Virginia	Tarik and Hazel met on an international dating site. After three months in a long-distance relationship, Tarik flew to the Philippines to meet Hazel. This, along with the subsequent proposal, was documented in season 2 of 90 Day Fiancé: Before the 90 Days. Hazel moved to the United States to live with Tarik and his daughter and planned to later bring her son to the US. They married in June 2020.	Tarik and Hazel separated in 2021 but reconciled in 2022. They are still working on bringing her son to the US.	
Tarik & Hazel	Hazel Cagalitan, 28; Quezon City, Philippines.	Tarik and Hazel met on an international dating site. After three months in a long-distance relationship, Tarik flew to the Philippines to meet Hazel. This, along with the subsequent proposal, was documented in season 2 of 90 Day Fiancé: Before the 90 Days. Hazel moved to the United States to live with Tarik and his daughter and planned to later bring her son to the US. They married in June 2020.	Tarik and Hazel separated in 2021 but reconciled in 2022. They are still working on bringing her son to the US.	

=== Season 9 ===
Couple	Individuals	Story	Outcome	Ref
Kara & Guillermo	Kara Bass, 29; Charlottesville, Virginia	Kara and Guillermo met in the Dominican Republic while she was on vacation and he was her server at a restaurant. They moved in together in the Dominican Republic and got engaged but Kara had to move back to the United States for work.	In 2022, Kara and Guillermo welcomed their son. The couple appeared on season 9 of 90 Day Fiance: Happily Ever After? They have since separated and are working on co-parenting their son.	
Kara & Guillermo	Guillermo Rojer, 23; Caracas, Venezuela	Kara and Guillermo met in the Dominican Republic while she was on vacation and he was her server at a restaurant. They moved in together in the Dominican Republic and got engaged but Kara had to move back to the United States for work.	In 2022, Kara and Guillermo welcomed their son. The couple appeared on season 9 of 90 Day Fiance: Happily Ever After? They have since separated and are working on co-parenting their son.	
Emily & Kobe	Emily Bieberly, 29; Kansas City, Missouri	Emily and Kobe met while both visiting China. After two months of dating, they got engaged and Emily found out she was pregnant shortly thereafter. Kobe moved back to his home country of Cameroon while the couple waited for their K-1 visa. Meanwhile, Emily gave birth to their son Koban. Kobe finally got his K-1 about a year later and moved in with Emily and her family. Her father was the only one supporting the household and expressed that the only thing they couldn't do was get Emily pregnant again. Later on in the season, it's revealed she is pregnant with the couple's second child after relying on ovulation cycle watching as their only form of birth control. They chose not to tell her family until after the wedding.	The couple welcomed their daughter Scarlett in 2021. They welcomed their third child, a son, in 2024. Their fourth child, a boy, was born in May 2026.	
Emily & Kobe	Kobe Blaise, 34; Buea, Cameroon		The couple welcomed their daughter Scarlett in 2021. They welcomed their third child, a son, in 2024. Their fourth child, a boy, was born in May 2026.	
Patrick & Thaís	Patrick Mendes, 31; Austin, Texas	Patrick met Thaís on a trip to Brazil to reconnect with his retired father. When Thaís arrived in America, she moved in with Patrick and his brother John, who she frequently clashed with. Additionally, Thaís didn't tell her father she was marrying Patrick. Despite all these challenges, Patrick and Thais married in early 2022. They welcomed a daughter named Aleesi in November 2022.	Patrick and Thais are now divorced. On May 2026, Thais was arrested following a domestic incident with Patrick, who she was separated from at the time. Patrick filed for divorce, which was finalized in June 2026. There are now rumors that the couple have reconciled after they were spotted together.	
Patrick & Thaís	Thaís Ramone, 25; Montes Claros, Brazil	Patrick met Thaís on a trip to Brazil to reconnect with his retired father. When Thaís arrived in America, she moved in with Patrick and his brother John, who she frequently clashed with. Additionally, Thaís didn't tell her father she was marrying Patrick. Despite all these challenges, Patrick and Thais married in early 2022. They welcomed a daughter named Aleesi in November 2022.	Patrick and Thais are now divorced. On May 2026, Thais was arrested following a domestic incident with Patrick, who she was separated from at the time. Patrick filed for divorce, which was finalized in June 2026. There are now rumors that the couple have reconciled after they were spotted together.	
Jibri & Miona	Jibri Bell, 28; Rapid City, South Dakota	Jibri Bell, frontman for the band Black Serbs, met Miona, a makeup artist, when he was touring in Serbia with his band. After proposing, Miona moved in with Jibri and his parents. Jibri had a fight with one of his bandmates who questioned his decision to marry Miona. Jibri and Miona married anyway.	Jibri and Miona divorced after less than three years of marriage. Miona is in a new relationship. Miona and her boyfriend got engaged in November 2026. Jibri now lives in Serbia with his new serbian fiance. They welcomed their first child, a son, in August 2026.	
Jibri & Miona	Miona Bell, 23; Belgrade, Serbia	Jibri Bell, frontman for the band Black Serbs, met Miona, a makeup artist, when he was touring in Serbia with his band. After proposing, Miona moved in with Jibri and his parents. Jibri had a fight with one of his bandmates who questioned his decision to marry Miona. Jibri and Miona married anyway.	Jibri and Miona divorced after less than three years of marriage. Miona is in a new relationship. Miona and her boyfriend got engaged in November 2026. Jibri now lives in Serbia with his new serbian fiance. They welcomed their first child, a son, in August 2026.	
Yvette & Mohamed	Yvette “Yve” Arellano, 48; Silver City, New Mexico	Yve fell for Mohamed after he messaged her on social media. The couple struggled with cultural differences as well as Mohamed's expectations of Yve as a Muslim man. Yve married Mohamed despite Mohamed suggesting he was going to leave her after receiving his Green Card.	Shortly after they married, Yve discovered that Mohamed was texting other women. In 2022, Yve was arrested and charged with one count of battery against a household member and one count of assault against a household member. Mohamed and Yve are now separated.	
Yvette & Mohamed	Mohamed Abdelhamed, 25; Egypt	Yve fell for Mohamed after he messaged her on social media. The couple struggled with cultural differences as well as Mohamed's expectations of Yve as a Muslim man. Yve married Mohamed despite Mohamed suggesting he was going to leave her after receiving his Green Card.	Shortly after they married, Yve discovered that Mohamed was texting other women. In 2022, Yve was arrested and charged with one count of battery against a household member and one count of assault against a household member. Mohamed and Yve are now separated.	
Bilal & Shaeeda	Bilal Hazziez, 42; Kansas City, Missouri	Bilal and Shaeeda met online. After spending a week together in person, they decided to get married. When Shaeeda moved to America, Bilal pranked her by taking her to a run-down house, but then took her to his real house. Shaeeda wanted children while Bilal was reluctant, as he already had 2 children. Bilal and Shaeeda married in December 2021.	After two miscarriages, Bilal and Shaeeda had their first child together, a son, in December 2024. The two are still together as of September 2026.	
Bilal & Shaeeda	Shaeeda Sween, 37; Trinidad and Tobago	Bilal and Shaeeda met online. After spending a week together in person, they decided to get married. When Shaeeda moved to America, Bilal pranked her by taking her to a run-down house, but then took her to his real house. Shaeeda wanted children while Bilal was reluctant, as he already had 2 children. Bilal and Shaeeda married in December 2021.	After two miscarriages, Bilal and Shaeeda had their first child together, a son, in December 2024. The two are still together as of September 2026.	
Ariela & Biniyam	Ariela Weinberg, 30; Princeton, New Jersey	Ariela and Biniyam were first introduced on season 2 of 90 Day Fiancé: The Other Way. They met in Ethiopia while Ariela was traveling after her divorce. They quickly hit it off and not long after, Ariela got pregnant. She moved to Ethiopia and gave birth to a boy named Avi. While living in Ethiopia, Ariela worried about Biniyam providing for their son. She leaned on her ex-husband for emotional support and her parents for financial support. It was discovered that Biniyam was previously married to another American woman, with whom he had a son. However she left and took her son to the U.S. with her. Ariela and Biniyam's sisters often clashed with each other. Biniyam and Ariela ended up moving to America, where they got married.	The couple appeared on 90 Day Fiance: Happily Ever After? and 90 Day: The Last Resort. On the latter, Ariela and Biniyam left the resort early after they agreed to separate and divorce. As of 2025, the couple is no longer together. Their main focus is co parenting their son.	
Ariela & Biniyam	Biniyam Shibre, 31; Addis Ababa, Ethiopia		The couple appeared on 90 Day Fiance: Happily Ever After? and 90 Day: The Last Resort. On the latter, Ariela and Biniyam left the resort early after they agreed to separate and divorce. As of 2025, the couple is no longer together. Their main focus is co parenting their son.	

=== Season 10 ===
Couple	Individuals	Story	Outcome	Ref
Clayton & Analí	Clayton Clark, 29; Lexington, Kentucky	Clayton and Analí met on a language-learning application, where they quickly became close. The pair will be living in his one-bedroom apartment along with several pets, including two guinea pigs. Clayton's mother, who lives in his closet, does not plan on moving out anytime soon, which causes tension between the couple. Further, Analí has been hiding her relationship from her father, disguising her true reason for coming to the US.	They are still together as of November 2025.	
Clayton & Analí	Analí Vallejos, 26; Chiclayo, Peru	Clayton and Analí met on a language-learning application, where they quickly became close. The pair will be living in his one-bedroom apartment along with several pets, including two guinea pigs. Clayton's mother, who lives in his closet, does not plan on moving out anytime soon, which causes tension between the couple. Further, Analí has been hiding her relationship from her father, disguising her true reason for coming to the US.	They are still together as of November 2025.	
Devin & Nick	Devin Hoofman, 25; Searcy, Arkansas	Devin met South Korean-born Nick on a dating app while on a solo trip to Australia. Two years after filing for their K-1 visa, Nick comes to the US, where he has difficulties adjusting to life in rural Arkansas due to cultural differences. They got married.	Given what was found on Devin's social media, it can be assumed that the couple have since separated/divorced. Nick has since moved to Texas as evidenced by a screenshot of his dating profile. Devin has sold the wedding dress she wore on the show.	
Devin & Nick	Seungdo “Nick” Ham, 30; Daejeon, South Korea	Devin met South Korean-born Nick on a dating app while on a solo trip to Australia. Two years after filing for their K-1 visa, Nick comes to the US, where he has difficulties adjusting to life in rural Arkansas due to cultural differences. They got married.	Given what was found on Devin's social media, it can be assumed that the couple have since separated/divorced. Nick has since moved to Texas as evidenced by a screenshot of his dating profile. Devin has sold the wedding dress she wore on the show.	
Ashley & Manuel	Ashley Michelle, 31; Rochester, New York	Ashley, who is a witch, met Manuel, a devout Catholic, in his home country of Ecuador 10 years ago. Their relationship did not last at the time. After several years apart, the couple has another go at making it work. Manuel has trouble coming to terms with his future wife's spirituality. They got married.	As of September 2026 Ashley and Manuel have separated.	
Ashley & Manuel	Manuel, 34; Quito, Ecuador	Ashley, who is a witch, met Manuel, a devout Catholic, in his home country of Ecuador 10 years ago. Their relationship did not last at the time. After several years apart, the couple has another go at making it work. Manuel has trouble coming to terms with his future wife's spirituality. They got married.	As of September 2026 Ashley and Manuel have separated.	
Nikki & Justin	Nikki Sanders, 47; Hoboken, New Jersey	Seventeen years ago, Nikki and Justin had their first shot at love as a couple before separating shortly after Justin had come to the US. Previously unbeknownst to him and after being together for two years, Nikki revealed to Justin during a confrontation that she is transgender. They seek to give love one last chance together as Nikki travels to meet Justin in his native Moldova.	Nikki and Justin broke up.	
Nikki & Justin	Igor "Justin" Shutencov, 36; Chişinău, Moldova	Seventeen years ago, Nikki and Justin had their first shot at love as a couple before separating shortly after Justin had come to the US. Previously unbeknownst to him and after being together for two years, Nikki revealed to Justin during a confrontation that she is transgender. They seek to give love one last chance together as Nikki travels to meet Justin in his native Moldova.	Nikki and Justin broke up.	
Rob & Sophie	Rob Warne, 32; Inglewood, California	Rob and Sophie met on social media, and both are multiracial. Sophie has been keeping a secret from him, which is that she is bisexual. "I care a lot about looks," Rob says. "Sophie is the hottest person I've been with and that's what I've been looking for." Sophie comes from a wealthy family and is not impressed with Rob's studio apartment, unsatisfied with her ability to do her makeup in the shared bathroom. The couple further deals with Sophie's mother not approving of Rob.	Rob and Sophie have appeared on spin offs 90 Day Fiance: Happily Ever After? and 90 Day: The Last Resort. On the latter, Sophie told Rob that she wanted to separate. As of 2025 they are separated. Rob later appeared on 90 Day Fiance: Hunt For Love.	
Rob & Sophie	Sophie Sierra, 23; London, England	Rob and Sophie met on social media, and both are multiracial. Sophie has been keeping a secret from him, which is that she is bisexual. "I care a lot about looks," Rob says. "Sophie is the hottest person I've been with and that's what I've been looking for." Sophie comes from a wealthy family and is not impressed with Rob's studio apartment, unsatisfied with her ability to do her makeup in the shared bathroom. The couple further deals with Sophie's mother not approving of Rob.	Rob and Sophie have appeared on spin offs 90 Day Fiance: Happily Ever After? and 90 Day: The Last Resort. On the latter, Sophie told Rob that she wanted to separate. As of 2025 they are separated. Rob later appeared on 90 Day Fiance: Hunt For Love.	
Gino & Jasmine	Gino Palazzolo, 52; Canton, Michigan	Jasmine has made it to the US after appearing with Gino on two seasons of 90 Day Fiancé: Before the 90 Days. She gives up balmy Panama to experience the cold Michigan winters for the first time. Jasmine is known to have frequent fights with Gino regarding his lack of desire to be intimate with her. Despite the fighting, the pair ultimately married in June 2023.	In an attempt to salvage their strained relationship, Gino agreed to an open marriage with Jasmine. This decision came after a prolonged period of intimacy issues, with the couple reportedly not being intimate for nine months. Jasmine later became pregnant by her boyfriend, Matt Branistareanu (who was the third addition to the open-marriage). Her pregnancy was announced in February 2025. Matt is the father, not Gino. Jasmine and Matt gave birth to a girl later in 2025. Jasmine is now living with Matt and their daughter in Florida. Gino and Jasmine's divorce has since been finalized.	
Gino & Jasmine	Jasmine Pineda, 36; Panama City, Panama	Jasmine has made it to the US after appearing with Gino on two seasons of 90 Day Fiancé: Before the 90 Days. She gives up balmy Panama to experience the cold Michigan winters for the first time. Jasmine is known to have frequent fights with Gino regarding his lack of desire to be intimate with her. Despite the fighting, the pair ultimately married in June 2023.		
Sam & Citra	Sam Wilson, 30; Cameron, Missouri	Sam has a "sordid" past and is from a small town in northwest Missouri. Citra is Muslim and values her father's opinion on her relationship. Citra's father comes to the US for two weeks, and Sam is unsure if the two will be able to convince him to approve their marriage. Citra's religious faith creates an intimacy barrier between the two. They married and had a daughter in 2024.	As of 2026, Sam and Citra are still together. They have a daughter.	
Sam & Citra	Citra, 26; Indonesia	Sam has a "sordid" past and is from a small town in northwest Missouri. Citra is Muslim and values her father's opinion on her relationship. Citra's father comes to the US for two weeks, and Sam is unsure if the two will be able to convince him to approve their marriage. Citra's religious faith creates an intimacy barrier between the two. They married and had a daughter in 2024.	As of 2026, Sam and Citra are still together. They have a daughter.	

=== Season 11 ===
Couple	Individuals	Story	Outcome	Ref
Jessica & Juan	Jessica Parsons, 30; Torrington, Wyoming	Juan and Jessica are returning from Season 3 of 90 Day Fiancé: Love in Paradise to begin their new life together. Juan moves to America to join his fiancée Jessica and their baby son, and soon-to-be stepsons, in a rural town in Wyoming. Juan's fidelity to Jessica is questioned. Jessica doubts Juan's ability for a major role shift - from a carefree cruise ship bartender to full-time dad of three.	As of 2025, they are still together.	
Jessica & Juan	Juan David Daza, 31; San Diego, California (Originally from Colombia)	Juan and Jessica are returning from Season 3 of 90 Day Fiancé: Love in Paradise to begin their new life together. Juan moves to America to join his fiancée Jessica and their baby son, and soon-to-be stepsons, in a rural town in Wyoming. Juan's fidelity to Jessica is questioned. Jessica doubts Juan's ability for a major role shift - from a carefree cruise ship bartender to full-time dad of three.	As of 2025, they are still together.	
Amani, Matt & Any	Amani Jlassi, 30; San Diego, California	Amani, Matt & Any are a throuple. Amani and Matt have been married for ten years and have two daughters. The two opened up their relationship to introduce Any - a single mom and exotic dancer - and are now contemplating divorce to bring Any to America to unite as three. However, they face difficulties with jealousy, boundaries, and Any's family being unaware of their polyamorous dynamic as she fears judgement.		
Amani, Matt & Any	Matt Jlassi, 36; San Diego, California	Amani, Matt & Any are a throuple. Amani and Matt have been married for ten years and have two daughters. The two opened up their relationship to introduce Any - a single mom and exotic dancer - and are now contemplating divorce to bring Any to America to unite as three. However, they face difficulties with jealousy, boundaries, and Any's family being unaware of their polyamorous dynamic as she fears judgement.		
Amani, Matt & Any	Hany "Any" Aguirre, 37; Tijuana, Mexico	Amani, Matt & Any are a throuple. Amani and Matt have been married for ten years and have two daughters. The two opened up their relationship to introduce Any - a single mom and exotic dancer - and are now contemplating divorce to bring Any to America to unite as three. However, they face difficulties with jealousy, boundaries, and Any's family being unaware of their polyamorous dynamic as she fears judgement.		
Shekinah & Sarper	Shekinah Garner, 43; Los Angeles, California	Shekinah and Sarper were previously featured on Season 5 and 6 of 90 Day Fiancé: The Other Way. Sarper's K-1 visa is finally approved and he moves to Los Angeles. Shekinah is still insecure of Sarper's past. Sarper finds Shekinah's house too small and becomes frustrated with their living arrangements. Sarper finds it difficult to navigate the relationships with Shekinah's friends and family.	Shekinah and Sarper appeared on Season 3 of 90 Day: The Last Resort. At the Tell All, Sarper revealed that he and Shekinah are separated.	
Shekinah & Sarper	Sarper Güven, 45; Istanbul, Turkey	Shekinah and Sarper were previously featured on Season 5 and 6 of 90 Day Fiancé: The Other Way. Sarper's K-1 visa is finally approved and he moves to Los Angeles. Shekinah is still insecure of Sarper's past. Sarper finds Shekinah's house too small and becomes frustrated with their living arrangements. Sarper finds it difficult to navigate the relationships with Shekinah's friends and family.	Shekinah and Sarper appeared on Season 3 of 90 Day: The Last Resort. At the Tell All, Sarper revealed that he and Shekinah are separated.	
Stevi & Mahdi	Stevi Savage, 37; Hattiesburg, Mississippi	Stevi is a single mother of two kids. For work, she teaches the English language and paints nude portraits of women. Mahdi was one of her English students. They fell in love and met in Turkey where Mahdi proposed. Stevi filed for the K-1 Visa so Mahdi could come live with her in the U.S. Upon Mahdi's arrival to the U.S., there were many obstacles. Mahdi was struggling with the emotional turmoil and guilt, caused by him leaving his family in Iran, a strict Muslim country. this guilt was excacerbated with the fact that if he were to return to Iran, he could get arrested. After seeing Stevi's home for the first time, Mahdi is shocked by the large amount of the nude portraits that Stevi had. Mahdi did not know about this aspect of Stevi. This leads Mahdi to question whether or not Stevi is bisexual. Stevi's father did not know about her relationship with Mahdi, and was surprised when Stevi told him that they were getting married. Nonetheless, he assured the couple that they had his support.	As of January 2026, the couple is still together.	
Stevi & Mahdi	Mahdi Al-Saadi, 26; Tehran, Iran		As of January 2026, the couple is still together.	
Mark & Mina	Mark Bessette, 58; West Ossipee, New Hampshire	Mark, a private jet pilot from the U.S., met Mina at a restaurant in Paris in 2019. They dated long-distance for two years before getting engaged. Six months after their engagement, Mina became pregnant. They welcomed their daughter, Maria, in Paris before Mina relocated to the U.S. on a K-1 visa. Mark’s 27-year-old daughter, Jordan, distrusted Mina and accused her of being after Mark's money. The two had a heated feud where Mina called Jordan a "snake" and temporarily uninvited her from the wedding. During a shopping trip, a friend revealed that Mark had bought a BMW for his ex-girlfriend, Jade. Mina met with Jade directly and discovered Mark had lied about who ended their past relationship and had been unfaithful. Mina had to move to the U.S. without her young son from a previous relationship, Clayton, due to passport and visa delays. Being separated from him caused Mina major emotional distress and made her hesitate about getting married without him. Mina struggled to adjust to Mark's quiet, rural home in New Hampshire, preferring a faster-paced city lifestyle. With help from Mark’s mother, Mina and Jordan sat down, apologized to each other, and smoothed things over. Jordan was re-invited to the wedding. Despite Clayton still being unable to attend in person, Mark and Mina moved forward with their ceremony. They exchanged vows in both English and French surrounded by family.	As of 2026, they are still married. Because Mina struggled with Mark's quiet, rural lifestyle in New Hampshire, the couple initially relocated to Boston, Massachusetts and later to Newport Beach, California.	
Mark & Mina	Aminata "Mina" Mack, 35; Paris, France		As of 2026, they are still married. Because Mina struggled with Mark's quiet, rural lifestyle in New Hampshire, the couple initially relocated to Boston, Massachusetts and later to Newport Beach, California.	
Greg & Joan	Gregory "Greg" Chillak, 35; Islip Terrace, New York	Greg, an aspiring baker from Long Island, New York, fell asleep on a stranger's shoulder during a flight in 2019. The man turned out to be a Ugandan safari company owner who invited Greg to visit Uganda, where Greg met and fell for Joan, an educated NGO director. After connecting in Uganda, the two maintained a long-distance relationship for roughly four years before Joan relocated to New York on a K-1 visa. Upon arriving in the U.S., Joan had to move into Greg's mother Lucille's Long Island home. Joan felt they had zero privacy, as Lucille constantly hovered, interrupted their alone time, and tried to take over their wedding plans. Joan was frustrated by Greg's lack of steady work, especially after he turned down a job offer while relying heavily on his mother. She eventually issued an ultimatum that she would return to Uganda if he did not secure stable employment. Greg struggled with the financial stress of paying Joan's traditional $3,000 Ugandan dowry to her family on top of his unstable income. Greg won back Joan and skeptical viewers by landing a state job, paying her dowry, and surprising her with a traditional Ugandan pre-wedding celebration. They married in New York, though Greg felt deeply for Joan because none of her family could attend in person.	As of January 2026, the couple is still together. They have moved out of Lucille's house into their own place. On 90 Day Diaries Season 8, they revealed that they conceived a baby boy but suffered a devastating miscarriage at 18 weeks following severe pregnancy complications. Despite the loss, the couple remains strong and supportive of one another.	
Greg & Joan	Joan Kruchov, 26; Kampala, Uganda		As of January 2026, the couple is still together. They have moved out of Lucille's house into their own place. On 90 Day Diaries Season 8, they revealed that they conceived a baby boy but suffered a devastating miscarriage at 18 weeks following severe pregnancy complications. Despite the loss, the couple remains strong and supportive of one another.	
Shawn & Alliya	Shawn Finch, 62; Los Angeles, California	Shawn, a celebrity hairstylist based in Los Angeles, met Alliya (who is from Rio de Janeiro, Brazil) on a dating app during the COVID-19 pandemic. When they first met, Alliya identified as a man named Douglas. During a trip together to Spain, Shawn took her to a wig shop, which sparked Alliya's journey to embrace her true identity as a transgender woman. While Shawn supported Alliya and proposed to her in Brazil, he openly struggled with mourning "Douglas" and adjusting his attraction as a gay man to a partner transitioning into womanhood. After Alliya arrived in Los Angeles on a K-1 visa, the couple clashed over relationship boundaries. Shawn wanted to maintain an open relationship so he could still be intimate with men, while Alliya pushed for monogamy and deeper romantic devotion. Alliya began consulting with doctors about gender-affirming surgeries, including breast implants and bottom surgery. Shawn felt overwhelmed by the pace of her medical transition and worried about how it would permanently change their physical intimacy. On their wedding day, Alliya spent nearly two hours getting her hair and makeup done, leaving guests—and Shawn's injured 85-year-old mother—waiting outside in 104°F heat. Furious, Shawn walked away from the altar, though the pair eventually reconciled and completed their marriage ceremony.	As of January 2026, the couple is (presumably) still together.	
Shawn & Alliya	Alliya de Batista, 25; Rio de Janeiro, Brazil		As of January 2026, the couple is (presumably) still together.	

=== Season 12 ===
Couple	Individuals	Story	Outcome	Ref
Catie & Josh	Catie Norboe, 26 Portland, Oregon	Catie and Josh met when Catie was pet sitting in London. She hooked up with all of Josh's friends, before meeting and making out with Josh. They later started dating. Catie has a tendency of going out, getting extremely drunk, and making out with guys. However, Josh is still willing to continue the relationship. The two get engaged and Josh comes to the U.S on the K1 Visa. Catie questions whether she is ready to settle down with one person for the rest of her life. She still continues to get drunk, and tries to make out with multiple guys at her birthday party while Josh is there. She asks Josh for an open relationship which Josh refuses. The couple later get married. After getting married, Catie gets drunk and makes out with a guy at a New Year's Party.	As of 2026, the couple is still together.	
Catie & Josh	Josh Atkins, 30 Cambridge, England		As of 2026, the couple is still together.	
Marissa & Edward	Marissa Rubinetti, 45 Blue Bell, Pennsylvania		As of 2026, the couple is still together.	
Marissa & Edward	Edward Gomez, 32 San Francisco de Macorís, Dominican Republic		As of 2026, the couple is still together.	
Mallorie & Rașit	Mallorie DeGrange, 29 Athens, Alabama		As of 2026, the couple is still together.	
Mallorie & Rașit	Rașit Kebabcı, 29 Marmaris, Turkey		As of 2026, the couple is still together.	
Shea & Anabelle	Shea McGuire, 54 Paducah, Kentucky		As of 2026, the couple is still together.	
Shea & Anabelle	Anabelle Chua, 54 Iloilo City, Philippines		As of 2026, the couple is still together.	
Debby & Mido	Debby Rolando, 55 New Orleans, Louisiana			
Debby & Mido	Mido Fayed, 41 Cairo, Egypt			
Ashia & Maxwell	Ashia Montgomery, 38 Alabaster, Alabama		As of January 2026, the couple is still together.	
Ashia & Maxwell	Maxwell Okeke, 28 Awka, Nigeria		As of January 2026, the couple is still together.	
Thomas & Paula	Thomas Dintino, 31 Long Beach, California		As of 2026, the couple is still together.	
Thomas & Paula	Paula Barbosa, 41 São Paulo, Brazil		As of 2026, the couple is still together.	
