= The Family Chantel =

American reality television series

- Genre: Reality television
- Starring: Chantel Everett; Pedro Jimeno
- Country of origin: United States
- Original language: English
- No. of seasons: 5
- No. of episodes: 50

Production
- Production company: Sharp Entertainment

Original release
- Network: TLC
- Release: July 22, 2019 – December 11, 2023

Related
- 90 Day Fiancé; 90 Day Fiancé: Happily Ever After?; 90 Day Fiancé: Self-Quarantined; 90 Day Fiancé: Love in Paradise; The Family Chantel: Pillow Talk; Ask Mama Chantel

The Family Chantel is an American reality television show that aired on TLC and followed the adventures of American Chantel Everett, her Dominican husband Pedro Jimeno, and their immediate families as they navigate an intercultural marriage. It was the first spin-off series of 90 Day Fiancé that followed an individual couple.

== Production ==
Season one premiered on July 22, 2019. The series was renewed for a second season, which premiered on October 12, 2020. Season three premiered on October 11, 2021. Season four premiered on June 6, 2022. The series returned for its final season on Monday, November 6, 2023.

== Premise ==
The series follows the lives of Chantel and Pedro residing in Atlanta,Georgia,who met and fell in love during Chantel's trip to the Dominican Republic. Season four of 90 Day Fiancé documents the couple's story.The couple navigates family drama and relationship problems. Seasons two and three of The Family Chantel were accompanied by the reaction show The Family Chantel: Pillow Talk.The couple also starred on 90 Day Fiancé: Happily Ever After? and 90 Day Fiancé: Self-Quarantined.They later divorce each other. Chantel's mother Karen Everett would later host her own digital series Ask Mama Chantel, and Pedro's mother Lidia Morel and sister Nicole Jimeno would join the season three cast of 90 Day Fiancé: Love in Paradise.

== Cast ==
The show stars Pedro Jimeno, Chantel Everett, Karen Everett, Thomas Everett, Riverknight Everett, and Winter Everett. Pedro's mother and sister, Lidia Morel and Nicole Jimeno, also appear on the show.

=== Main ===
Cast member	Seasons				
Cast member	1	2	3	4	5
Chantel Everett-Jimeno	Main	Main	Main	Main	Main
Pedro Jimeno	Main	Main	Main	Main	Main
Karen Everett	Main	Main	Main	Main	Main
Riverknight Everett	Main	Main	Main	Main	Main
Winter Everett	Main	Main	Main	Main	Main
Thomas Everett	Recurring	Main	Main	Main	Main
Nicole Jimeno	Recurring	Main	Main	Main	Main
Royal Everett		Main	Guest (Note: Royal and Angenette appeared in 3x1 after their wedding.)		
Angenette Wylie		Main	Guest (Note: Royal and Angenette appeared in 3x1 after their wedding.)		

=== Recurring ===
Cast member	Seasons				
Cast member	1	2	3	4	5
Lidia Morel	Recurring	Recurring	Recurring	Recurring	Recurring
Coraima Morla	Recurring	Recurring	Recurring	Recurring	Recurring
Jah	Recurring (Note: Appears only via video call)		Recurring		
Alejandro Padrón		Recurring	Recurring	Recurring	Recurring
Megan			Recurring		

== Episodes ==
=== Series overview ===
Season	Episodes	Originally released	
Season	Episodes	First released	Last released
1	8	July 22, 2019	September 9, 2019
2	10	October 12, 2020	December 14, 2020
3	12	October 11, 2021	December 27, 2021
4	14	June 6, 2022	September 5, 2022
5	6	November 6, 2023	December 11, 2023

=== Season 1 (2019) ===
No. overall	No. in season	Title	Original release date	US viewers (millions)
1	1	"All's Fair in Love and War"	July 22, 2019	N/A
2	2	"How to Come to America"	July 29, 2019	N/A
3	3	"The Truth Comes Out"	August 5, 2019	N/A
4	4	"It's All Crashing Down"	August 12, 2019	N/A
5	5	"Pack Your Bags"	August 19, 2019	N/A
6	6	"The Fight to Get Along"	August 26, 2019	N/A
7	7	"The Last Supper"	September 2, 2019	N/A
8	8	"What Are Your Intentions?"	September 9, 2019	N/A

=== Season 2 (2020) ===
No. overall	No. in season	Title	Original release date	US viewers (millions)
9	1	"Like Sister, Like Brother"	October 12, 2020	N/A
10	2	"A New Family Feud"	October 19, 2020	N/A
11	3	"Ugly Sweaters, Painted Beards"	October 26, 2020	N/A
12	4	"Sister Act"	November 2, 2020	N/A
13	5	"A Thrilla in Manila"	November 9, 2020	N/A
14	6	"Loose Lips Sink Ships"	November 16, 2020	N/A
15	7	"A Royal Mess"	November 23, 2020	N/A
16	8	"Crazy Stupid Love"	November 30, 2020	N/A
17	9	"Sometimes People Are Snakes"	December 7, 2020	N/A
18	10	"Wedding Crashers"	December 14, 2020	N/A

=== Season 3 (2021) ===
No. overall	No. in season	Title	Original release date	US viewers (millions)
19	1	"Unannounced and Uninvited"	October 11, 2021	0.86
20	2	"The Blame Game"	October 18, 2021	0.84
21	3	"Looking For Trouble"	October 25, 2021	0.89
22	4	"Finding Your Roots"	November 1, 2021	0.94
23	5	"Risks and Rewards"	November 8, 2021	0.76
24	6	"Home For the Holidays"	November 15, 2021	1.04
25	7	"Breaking Bread"	November 22, 2021	0.96
26	8	"Truth Be Told"	November 29, 2021	1.13
27	9	"Burning Bridges"	December 6, 2021	0.98
28	10	"On My Best Behavior"	December 13, 2021	0.98
29	11	"My Other Family"	December 20, 2021	0.97
30	12	"Mad at the World"	December 27, 2021	1.12

=== Season 4 (2022) ===
No. overall	No. in season	Title	Original release date	U.S. viewers (millions)
31	1	"Home Is Where the Tension Is"	June 6, 2022	0.89
32	2	"No Turning Back Now"	June 13, 2022	0.78
33	3	"On the Chin"	June 20, 2022	0.89
34	4	"No Ninos or Ninas"	June 27, 2022	0.90
35	5	"Unusual and Highly Suspect"	July 4, 2022	0.77
36	6	"You Should Be Thanking Me"	July 11, 2022	0.84
37	7	"Dirty Laundry"	July 18, 2022	0.96
38	8	"Recipe for Disaster"	July 25, 2022	0.94
39	9	"Can I Come In?"	August 1, 2022	1.02
40	10	"What Are You Doing Here?"	August 8, 2022	0.89
41	11	"Like a Lawyer"	August 15, 2022	0.97
42	12	"Not So Separate Separation"	August 22, 2022	1.01
43	13	"Hot Pursuit"	August 29, 2022	1.14
44	14	"The End of Forever"	September 5, 2022	N/A

=== Season 5 (2023) ===
No. overall	No. in season	Title	Original release date	US viewers (millions)
45	1	"Two Households, Both Alike"	November 6, 2023	N/A
46	2	"A Madness Most Discrete"	November 13, 2023	N/A
47	3	"A Rose By Any Other Name"	November 20, 2023	N/A
48	4	"Fortunes Fool"	November 27, 2023	N/A
49	5	"A Plague on Both Your Houses"	December 4, 2023	N/A
50	6	"Parting Is Such Sweet Sorrow"	December 11, 2023	N/A

== Authenticity ==
The veracity of the events depicted for season three on Pedro's storyline having never met his half-siblings had been heavily criticized and reported by entertainment websites such as Screen Rant, Monsters and Critics, Daily Soap Dish, and In Touch Weekly when a 2014 group photo with Pedro, Nicole, their half-siblings, and Chantel was taken and posted on the Instagram of Pedro's half-brother's wife Wilka.

== See also ==
- 90 Day Fiancé
- 90 Day Fiancé: Happily Ever After?
- 90 Day Fiancé: Self-Quarantined
- 90 Day Fiancé: Love in Paradise
- The Family Chantel: Pillow Talk
- Ask Mama Chantel
