= Daily Soap Dish =

- Website type: Soap opera news site
- Available in: English
- Headquarters: {{{location_country}}}
- Founder: Daniel Babis
- Website: dailysoapdish.com
- Launched: 2018

Daily Soap Dish is a soap opera news website. Started by Daniel Babis in 2018, the site covers the five main American soap operas: The Young and the Restless, The Bold and the Beautiful, Days of Our Lives, General Hospital and Beyond the Gates. It has also previously covered 90 Day Fiancé, reality TV, the British royal family, and other general TV and entertainment news.

In May 2020, Daily Soap Dish broke the story about a 90 Day Fiancé cast member having allegedly assaulted a young girl.

According to Similarweb, as of July 2026, the website has a global rank of around 900,000.
