= Kara Leona =

American reality television star and singer (born 1992)

- Leona in 2026
- Born: Kara Leona Bass; May 11, 1992 (age 34); Charlottesville, Virginia, U.S.
- Occupations: Singer; model; realtor; content creator
- Years active: 2022–present
- Known for: 90 Day Fiancé
- Spouse: Guillermo Rojer (m. 2021; div. 2026)
- Children: 1
- Musical career
- Genres: Bachata; latin urban; pop
- Instrument: Vocals
- Website: karaleona.com

Kara Leona Bass (born May 11, 1992) is an American reality television star, singer, model and adult performer. She became known for appearing in the TLC reality television franchise, 90 Day Fiancé. In 2023, she began a music career, focusing mainly on the bachata genre.

== Career ==
=== 2022–2023: 90 Day Fiancé and music debut ===
Before her singing career, Kara became known for appearing in the TLC reality television series 90 Day Fiancé alongside her husband, Guillermo Rojer, during season 9 in April 2022. The series follows couples who have applied for or received a K-1 visa, which allows foreign fiancées of U.S. citizens to enter the United States with the requirement to marry within 90 days. The series followed Kara and Guillermo, a Venezuelan, through their K-1 visa process.

In 2023, she began her music career with her debut song, "On My Own". The song belongs to the bachata genre, which is a Latin music genre, and is described by Kara as a kind of breakup song. In the music video for the song, Kara appears with her husband, Guillermo Rojer, pretending to breakup. That same year, she released her second song, "Magic Is Here".

=== 2024–present: Subsequent songs ===
In 2024, Kara released the song "YDKM", which stands for "You Don't Know Me", and aims to send a clear message to online haters. Kara said the song is meant to be "uplifting" to combat the hate she receives online from strangers on the Internet. On August 16, 2024, Kara released her fourth single "Save Me".

Kara's foray into Latin music has profiled her as one of the most promising foreign voices in the genre, and with only two years in the music business, she has positioned herself as an emerging voice in bachata. In 2025, she released the single "Lento" in collaboration with music producer DJ Husky, which was followed by the single "El Reloj" in collaboration with Polish music artist DJ Cat, and the single "Buenos Aires" in collaboration with Italian DJ and producer Guido Londino. These songs were performed in Spanish.

In August 2025, Kara released the single "Criminal", again in collaboration with DJ Husky and Cuban music producer Dimelo Cupido. Kara revealed that the song is a kind of spicier type of energy, saying that the whole concept of the song is closely related to her personal life. In the video clip for the song, Kara collaborated with a group of men from the 90 Day Fiancé franchise, who call themselves the "90 Day Bad Boys".

== Other ventures ==
Bass has worked as a real estate agent in the Charlottesville, Virginia, area and as a provider of adult content on her OnlyFans site.

== Personal life ==
Kara began dating Venezuelan Guillermo Rojer after they met in the Dominican Republic in 2020. They were engaged within a few months and married on July 23, 2021, in Albemarle County, Virginia. Their son was born on December 3, 2022. In 2024, rumors broke out that the couple might have divorced. In 2025, during season 9 of the 90 Day Fiancé spin-off series, 90 Day Fiancé: Happily Ever After?, the couple officially revealed their split. However, Kara and Guillermo had unfollowed each other on social media long before their separation was announced.

== Discography ==
Singles
Year	Title	Featured artists	Album
2023	"On My Own"		Non-album singles
2023	"Magic Is Here"		Non-album singles
2024	"YDKM"		Non-album singles
2024	"Save Me"		Non-album singles
2025	"Lento"	DJ Husky	Non-album singles
2025	"El Reloj"	DJ Cat	Non-album singles
2025	"Buenos Aires"	Guido Londino	Non-album singles
2025	"Criminal"	DJ Husky and Dimelo Cupido	Non-album singles
2025	"Extraños"	Jiory	Non-album singles
2026	"True Love"		Non-album singles
2026	"Amor Nuclear"	Jiory	Non-album singles
2026	"Nobody"		Non-album singles
TBA	"Freak Bitch"		Non-album singles

== Filmography ==
Television roles
Year	Title	Role	Notes
2022–2026	90 Day Fiancé	Herself	Season 9 plus spin-off episodes
