= 90 Day Fiancé =

American reality television series

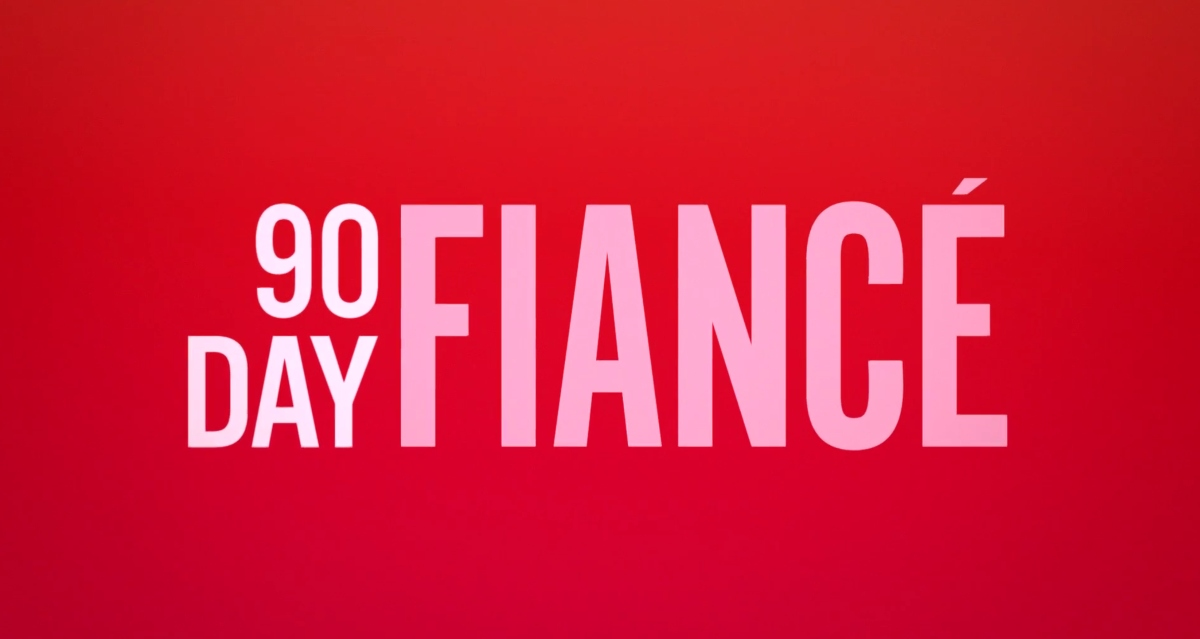
- Also known as: 90 Days to Wed
- Genre: Reality
- Presented by: Shaun Robinson
- Starring: 90 Day Fiancé cast
- Country of origin: United States
- Original language: English
- No. of seasons: 12
- No. of episodes: 166 (list of episodes)

Production
- Production company: Sharp Entertainment

Original release
- Network: TLC; Discovery+
- Release: January 12, 2014 – present

Related
- List of 90 Day franchise; Match Me Abroad

90 Day Fiancé is an American reality television series on TLC that follows couples who have applied for or received a K-1 visa, which allows foreign fiancés of American citizens to enter the United States with the requirement to marry within 90 days. The series premiered on January 12, 2014, and has aired for 12 seasons; its most recent season, season 12, premiered on May 10, 2026 and ended with a three-part Tell-All in September 2026.

The series has spawned numerous spin-offs, including 90 Day Fiancé: Happily Ever After, which tracks past couples after their marriages; 90 Day Fiancé: Before the 90 Days, which features couples who met online but have not yet begun the K-1 visa process; and 90 Day Fiancé: The Other Way, where the American partner relocates to their partner's home country. Collectively, the original series and its spin-offs are referred to by TLC's parent company Warner Bros. Discovery as the "90 Day Fiancé Universe" or simply the "90 Day Universe".

== Premise ==
The show is centered around the K-1 visa process, which allows a fiancé from another country to travel to the United States to live with their prospective American spouse. The K-1 visa is designed to provide time for the couple to arrange their marriage ceremony. As part of the visa process, each couple is required to sign documents affirming their intent to marry. If the couple does not marry within 90 days of entering the United States, the foreign fiancé must leave the country. Couples often face challenges such as language barriers, culture shock, and skepticism from friends and family.

== Episodes ==
| Season | Episodes | Originally released | |
| Season | Episodes | First released | Last released |
|---|---|---|---|
| 1 | 6 | January 12, 2014 | February 23, 2014 |
| 2 | 12 | October 19, 2014 | December 28, 2014 |
| 3 | 12 | October 11, 2015 | December 6, 2015 |
| 4 | 14 | September 11, 2016 | November 20, 2016 |
| 5 | 13 | October 8, 2017 | December 18, 2017 |
| 6 | 13 | October 21, 2018 | January 13, 2019 |
| 7 | 15 | November 3, 2019 | February 17, 2020 |
| 8 | 19 | December 6, 2020 | February 21, 2021 |
| 9 | 19 | April 17, 2022 | August 21, 2022 |
| 10 | 20 | October 8, 2023 | March 10, 2024 |
| 11 | 16 | February 16, 2025 | June 1, 2025 |
| 12 | 15 | May 10, 2026 | August 16, 2026 |

== 90 Day franchise ==
=== Current spin-offs ===
==== 90 Day Fiancé: Happily Ever After? (2016–present) ====
90 Day Fiancé: Happily Ever After? is a documentary series on TLC and a spin-off of 90 Day Fiancé. Announced in August 2016, the series follows six couples from previous seasons of 90 Day Fiancé, documenting their lives post-marriage. The series premiered on September 11, 2016, following the conclusion of season 4 of 90 Day Fiancé. The first season ended in November 2016 with a two-part "Tell All" special and a renewal announcement for season 2, which premiered on June 25, 2017. Subsequent seasons premiered as follows: season 3 on May 20, 2018; season 4 on April 28, 2019; season 5 on June 14, 2020; season 6 on April 25, 2021; season 7 on August 28, 2022; season 8 on May 17, 2024; and season 9 premiered on July 6, 2025.

==== 90 Day Fiancé: Before the 90 Days (2017–present) ====
In November 2016, TLC announced a second spin-off series, 90 Day Fiancé: Before the 90 Days, which premiered on August 6, 2017. The series follows couples whose relationships began online and documents their first in-person meetings. The second season premiered on August 5, 2018; season 3 on August 4, 2019; season 4 on February 23, 2020; and season 5 on December 12, 2021. Casting for season 6 had already started by the end of season 5, although the show had not yet been officially renewed.

==== 90 Day Fiancé: The Other Way (2019–present) ====
90 Day Fiancé: The Other Way was announced in May 2019 and aired on June 3. The spin-off is dedicated to couples where the American partner marries their partner abroad and moves to their country.

==== Pillow Talk (2019–present) ====
Announced in April 2019, 90 Day Fiancé: Pillow Talk is a 90 Day alumni reaction show

==== 90 Day Pillow Talk: The Single Life (2021–present) ====
A companion series to The Single Life that follows the same premise as Pillow Talk.

==== 90 Day Diaries (2021–) ====
90 Day alumni film their day-to-day lives without a camera crew.

- 90 Day Diaries: Ukraine - A special that premiered on April 18, 2022, featuring cast members affected by the Russian invasion of Ukraine.

==== 90 Day: The Single Life (2021–) ====
Former cast members whose relationships ended during or after the show start dating again.

==== 90 Day Fiancé: Love in Paradise (2021–) ====
90 Day Fiancé: Love in Paradise - Couples who found love in the Caribbean and are hopeful their relationships will continue, despite the miles and drama between them.

==== David & Annie: After the 90 Days (2022–) ====
David & Annie: After the 90 Days

==== Loren & Alexei: After the 90 Days (2022–) ====
- Loren & Alexei: After the 90 Days

==== 90 Day: The Last Resort (2023–) ====
- 90 Day: The Last Resort - premiered August 14, 2023.

==== 90 Day: The Last Resort Between the Sheets (2024–) ====
A behind-the-scenes companion series to 90 Day: The Last Resort.

=== Former spin-offs ===
==== 90 Day Fiancé: What Now? (2017–2020) ====
In March 2017, TLC announced a spin-off series, 90 Day Fiancé: What Now?, available only on TLCgo. Updates about 90 Day alumni was initially released online on July 30, 2017, then combined into episodes and aired in a two-part special on September 17 and 24. The 2018 edition was also first uploaded online and this time was a three-part special on July 15, 22, and 29. Unlike the previous two seasons, season 3 contained five full episodes. The fourth season was made up of seven episodes, which were released between April and June 2020. As of August 2, 2022, the show has not been canceled or renewed.

==== 90 Day Fiancé: Just Landed (2019) ====
A mini-series that followed couples in the 24-hours after their partner arrived into the United States.

==== 90 Day Fiancé: Self-Quarantined (2020) ====
A limited series that ran during the Covid-19 pandemic.

==== 90 Day Journey (2021) ====
A curated mini-series, which is made up of every single scene a couple has appeared in across each show in the 90 Day Universe.

==== 90 Day Bares All (2021) ====
Cast members from the 90 Day Fiancé universe provide an uncensored look at untold stories and never-before-seen footage from the franchise.

== Special spin-offs ==
- Ask Mama Chantel - Premiered on October 22, 2020, on Facebook Watch.
- Spice It Up with David and Annie - Premiered on October 28, 2020, on Facebook Watch.
- 90 Day: Foody Call
- 90 Day Fiancé: Love Games - Game show that premiered on Valentine's Day February 14, 2021 on discovery+.
- 90 Day Fiancé: The Podcast - The official 90 Day Fiancé podcast launched on December 1, 2020, on Apple, Spotify, Stitcher and Google Podcast.
- 90 Day Lovers' Collection - A compilation show that premiered on Valentine's Day February 14, 2021 on discovery+ of memorable moments that have happened across the 90 Day Fiancé universe. The collection was later made available on the official TLC Southeast Asia Facebook Watch and StarzPlay.
- 90 Day Fiancé: Watch Party
- 90 Day Fiancé: Extra Love
- 90 Day Fiancé: Extended
- 90 Day Fiancé: More to Love
- 90 Day Fiancé: Before the 90 Days - More to Love
- 90 Day Fiancé: Happily Ever After? More to Love
- 90 Day Fiancé: The Other Way - More to Love
- 90 Day Fiancé: Clip Shows

=== International versions ===
- 90 Day Fiancé: UK
- Ensitreffit ulkomailla - Finnish version that premiered on November 23, 2021, on discovery+ Finland and TV5.
- Älskar, älskar inte (aka Love Me, Love Me Not in English, Elsker, elsker ikke in Danish and Norwegian, and Rakastaa, ei rakasta in Finnish)- Swedish version that premiered on January 19, 2021, on discovery+ Sweden and produced by Dare Television.
- Pyjama Party: 90 Day Fiancé - Dutch VIPs react to the eighth season of 90 Day Fiancé.
- Grænseløst forelsket (aka Kärlek över gränserna Danmark in Swedish, Grenseløst forelsket Danmark in Norwegian, and Rakkautta yli rajojen Tanska in Finnish) - Danish version that premiered on August 7, 2022, on discovery+ Denmark.
- Grenseløst forelsket (aka Kärlek över gränserna Norge in Swedish, Grænseløst forelsket - Norge in Danish, and Rakkautta yli rajojen Norja in Finnish) - Norwegian version that premiered on March 23, 2022, on discovery+ Norway and TVNorge.
