= List of Ion Television affiliates =

The following is a list of affiliates for Ion Television, a network owned by the Scripps Networks division of the E. W. Scripps Company.

== Affiliates ==
=== Nationwide ===
Streaming feeds of Ion Television
Provider	Channel	Notes
The Roku Channel	523	National FAST channel feed
Samsung TV Plus	1051	National FAST channel feed
Vizio WatchFree+	217	National FAST channel feed

=== Over the air ===
Affiliates of Ion Television
Media market	State/Dist./Terr.	Station	Channel
Birmingham	Alabama	WPXH-TV	44
Huntsville	Alabama	WAAY-TV	31.2
Mobile	Alabama	WKRG-TV	5.5
Montgomery	Alabama	WAKA	8.3
Anchorage	Alaska	KDMD	33
Anchorage	Alaska	KTBY	4.5
Fairbanks	Alaska	KATN	2.4
Phoenix	Arizona	KPPX-TV	51
Tucson	Arizona	KGUN-TV	9.5
Yuma	Arizona	KYMA-DT	13.4
Jonesboro	Arkansas	KIAT-LD	25.4
Paragould	Arkansas	KJTB-LD	36.2
Little Rock	Arkansas	KASN	38.3
Bakersfield	California	KXBF-LD	14.6
Bakersfield	California	KERO-TV	23.4
Chico–Redding	California	KHSL-TV	12.5
Eureka	California	KIEM-TV	3.2
Fresno	California	KVBC-LD	13
Los Angeles	California	KPXN-TV	30
Monterey	California	KION-TV	46.3
Sacramento	California	KSPX-TV	29
San Diego	California	KSWB-TV	69.4
San Francisco	California	KKPX-TV	65
San Luis Obispo	California	KSBY	6.6
Colorado Springs	Colorado	KOAA-TV	5.4
Denver	Colorado	KPXC-TV	59
Denver	Colorado	KCDO-TV	10.2
Denver	Colorado	KSBS-CD	10.2
Grand Junction	Colorado	KJCT-CD	8.3
Hartford	Connecticut	WHPX-TV	26
Washington	District of Columbia	WPXW-TV	66
Fort Myers	Florida	WFTX-TV	36.5
Gainesville	Florida	WOGX	51.3
Jacksonville	Florida	WPXC-TV	21
Miami–Fort Lauderdale	Florida	WPXM-TV	35
Orlando	Florida	WOPX-TV	56
Panama City	Florida	WJHG-TV	7.4
Tallahassee	Florida	WCTV	6.4
Tallahassee	Florida	WNXG-LD	38.4
Tampa	Florida	WXPX-TV	66.2
West Palm Beach	Florida	WPTV-TV	5.4
West Palm Beach	Florida	WPXP-TV	67
Albany	Georgia	WSWG	44.4
Atlanta	Georgia	WPXA-TV	14
Augusta	Georgia	WJBF-TV	6.4
Columbus	Georgia	WRBL	3.3
Macon	Georgia	WPGA-TV	58.3
Savannah	Georgia	WTOC-TV	11.5
Honolulu	Hawaii	KPXO-TV	66
Boise	Idaho	KTRV-TV	12
Idaho Falls	Idaho	KVUI	31
Twin Falls	Idaho	KSVT-LD	14.2
Chicago	Illinois	WCPX-TV	38
Harrisburg	Illinois	WSIL-TV	3.5
Peoria	Illinois	WEEK-TV	25.4
Rockford	Illinois	WIFR-LD	23.4
Springfield	Illinois	WAND	17.3
Springfield	Illinois	WCQA-LD	16.4
Evansville	Indiana	WTVW	7.4
Evansville	Indiana	WELW-LD	30.3
Fort Wayne	Indiana	WANE-TV	15.2
Gary	Indiana	KPDS-LD	49.4
Indianapolis	Indiana	WIPX-TV	63
Lafayette	Indiana	WLFI-TV	18.3
South Bend	Indiana	WHME-TV	46.2
Terre Haute	Indiana	WTHI-TV	10.4
Cedar Rapids	Iowa	KPXR-TV	48
Davenport	Iowa	KWQC-TV	6.2
Des Moines	Iowa	KFPX-TV	39
Sioux City	Iowa	KSXE-LD	16.3
Sioux City	Iowa	KTIV	4.5
Garden City	Kansas	KSNG	11.3
Great Bend	Kansas	KSNC	2.3
Topeka	Kansas	KSNT	27.3
Wichita	Kansas	KFVT-LD	34.7
Wichita	Kansas	KSNW	3.3
Bowling Green	Kentucky	WNKY-LD	35
Lexington	Kentucky	WUPX-TV	67
Louisville	Kentucky	WDRB-TV	41.3
Alexandria	Louisiana	KLAX-TV	31.3
Baton Rouge	Louisiana	WVLA-TV	33.3
Lafayette	Louisiana	KLFY-TV	10.3
Lake Charles	Louisiana	KVHP	29.4
New Orleans	Louisiana	WPXL-TV	49
Shreveport	Louisiana	KSHV-TV	45.3
West Monroe	Louisiana	KMCT-TV	39.2
Bangor	Maine	WABI-TV	5.5
Portland	Maine	WIPL	35
Baltimore	Maryland	WMAR-TV	2.5
Baltimore	Maryland	WMJF-CD	39
Hagerstown	Maryland	WWPX-TV	60
Salisbury	Maryland	WMDT	47.4
Boston	Massachusetts	WBPX-TV	68
Springfield	Massachusetts	WWLP	22.3
Detroit	Michigan	WPXD-TV	31
Flint	Michigan	WNEM-TV	5.4
Grand Rapids–Lansing	Michigan	WZPX-TV	43
Lake City	Michigan	WMNN-LD	26.4
Lansing	Michigan	WILX-TV	10.4
Marquette	Michigan	WZMQ	19.7
Traverse City	Michigan	WFQX-TV	32.3
Duluth	Minnesota	WDIO-DT	10.3
Hibbing	Minnesota	WIRT-DT	13.3
Mankato	Minnesota	KEYC-TV	12.3
Minneapolis–Saint Paul	Minnesota	KPXM-TV	41
Rochester	Minnesota	KIMT	3.3
Biloxi–Gulfport	Mississippi	WLOX	13.5
Greenville	Mississippi	WFXW	15.2
Hattiesburg	Mississippi	WHLT	22.3
Jackson	Mississippi	WJTV	12.3
Meridian	Mississippi	WTOK-TV	11.4
Tupelo	Mississippi	WTVA	9.3
Columbia	Missouri	KGKM-LD	36.2
Joplin	Missouri	KODE-TV	12.4
Joplin	Missouri	KPJO-LD	49.6
Kansas City	Missouri	KPXE-TV	50
Poplar Bluff	Missouri	KPOB-DT	15.5
Springfield	Missouri	KFKY-LD	20.2
Springfield	Missouri	KRBK	49.4
St. Joseph	Missouri	KQTV	2.3
St. Louis	Missouri	WRBU	46
Bozeman	Montana	KBZK	7.4
Butte	Montana	KXLF-TV	4.4
Great Falls	Montana	KRTV	3.4
Hardin–Billings	Montana	KHMT	4.4
Helena	Montana	KXLH-LD	9.4
Kalispell	Montana	KAJJ-CD	8.4
Missoula	Montana	KPAX-TV	8.4
Lincoln	Nebraska	KNHL	5.4
Lincoln	Nebraska	KSNB-TV	4.3
McCook	Nebraska	KSNK	8.3
North Platte	Nebraska	KNOP-TV	2.3
Omaha	Nebraska	WOWT	6.4
Las Vegas	Nevada	KMCC	34.2
Reno	Nevada	KTVN	2.3
Concord–Manchester	New Hampshire	WPXG-TV	21
Albuquerque	New Mexico	KWBQ	19.4
Albany	New York	WYPX-TV	55
Binghamton	New York	WICZ-TV	40.3
Buffalo–Rochester	New York	WPXJ-TV	51
Elmira	New York	WENY-TV	36.4
New York City	New York	WPXN-TV	31
Rochester	New York	WHEC-TV	10.4
Syracuse	New York	WSPX-TV	56
Watertown	New York	WVNC-LD	45.3
Charlotte	North Carolina	WJZY	46.6
Greensboro	North Carolina	WGPX-TV	16
Greenville	North Carolina	WEPX-TV	38
Jacksonville	North Carolina	WPXU-TV	35
Raleigh–Durham	North Carolina	WRPX-TV	47
Wilmington	North Carolina	WSFX-TV	26.4
Bismarck	North Dakota	KBMY	17.4
Grand Forks	North Dakota	WDAZ-TV	8.4
Fargo	North Dakota	WDAY-TV	6.4
Minot	North Dakota	KMCY-DT	14.4
Cincinnati	Ohio	WXIX-TV	19.5
Cleveland	Ohio	WVPX-TV	23
Columbus	Ohio	WCMH-TV	4.3
Dayton	Ohio	WKOI-TV	43
Toledo	Ohio	WTVG	13.5
Youngstown	Ohio	WYFX-LD	62.3
Oklahoma City	Oklahoma	KOPX-TV	62
Tulsa	Oklahoma	KTPX-TV	44
Bend	Oregon	KTVZ	21.4
Eugene	Oregon	KEZI	9.3
Medford–Klamath Falls	Oregon	KMVU-DT	26.3
Pendleton	Oregon	KFFX-TV	11.3
Portland	Oregon	KPXG-TV	22
Altoona	Pennsylvania	WKBS-TV	47.4
Erie	Pennsylvania	WICU-TV	12.3
Harrisburg	Pennsylvania	WHTM-TV	27.2
Philadelphia	Pennsylvania	WPPX-TV	61
Pittsburgh	Pennsylvania	WINP-TV	16
Scranton	Pennsylvania	WQPX-TV	64
Providence	Rhode Island	WPXQ-TV	69
Charleston	South Carolina	WCBD-TV	2.3
Columbia	South Carolina	WZRB	47
Greenville	South Carolina	WSPA-TV	7.3
Myrtle Beach	South Carolina	WBTW	13.3
Rapid City	South Dakota	KCLO-TV	15.3
Sioux Falls	South Dakota	KELO-TV	11.3
Sioux Falls	South Dakota	KSFL-TV	36
Chattanooga	Tennessee	WRCB	3.3
Knoxville	Tennessee	WPXK-TV	54
Memphis	Tennessee	WPXX-TV	50
Nashville	Tennessee	WTVF	5.2
Abilene	Texas	KTAB-TV	32.4
Amarillo	Texas	KAUO-LD	15.5
Amarillo	Texas	KEYU	31.4
Austin	Texas	KVAT-LD	17.5
Austin	Texas	KXAN-TV	36.3
Beaumont	Texas	KUIL-LD	12.6
Bryan	Texas	KRHD-CD	40.3
Corpus Christi	Texas	KRIS-TV	6.5
Corpus Christi	Texas	KYDF-LD	34.3
Dallas–Fort Worth	Texas	KPXD-TV	68
El Paso	Texas	KVIA-TV	7.3
Houston	Texas	KPXB-TV	49
Lubbock	Texas	KJTV-TV	34.3
McAllen	Texas	KAZH-LD	57.2
McAllen	Texas	KNVO	48.4
Midland–Odessa	Texas	KCWO-TV	4.3
Midland–Odessa	Texas	KTLE-LD	7.7
San Angelo	Texas	KSAN-TV	3.4
San Antonio	Texas	KPXL-TV	26
Sherman	Texas	KXII	12.4
Tyler	Texas	KETK-TV	56.3
Tyler	Texas	KPKN-LD	33.2
Victoria	Texas	KAVU-TV	25.5
Waco	Texas	KCEN-TV	6.5
Waco	Texas	KXXV	25.4
Wichita Falls	Texas	KAUZ-TV	6.4
Salt Lake City	Utah	KUPX-TV	16.4
Salt Lake City	Utah	KSTU	13.2
Burlington	Vermont	WCAX-TV	3.5
Bristol	Virginia	WLFG	68.3
Charlottesville	Virginia	WCAV	19.4
Harrisonburg	Virginia	WHSV-TV	3.3
Norfolk	Virginia	WPXV-TV	49
Richmond	Virginia	WFWG-LD	30.4
Richmond	Virginia	WTVR-TV	6.5
Roanoke	Virginia	WPXR-TV	38
Kennewick	Washington	KBWU-LD	11.3
Seattle–Tacoma	Washington	KWPX-TV	33
Spokane	Washington	KGPX-TV	34
Yakima	Washington	KCYU-LD	11.3
Bluefield	West Virginia	WLFG	40.3
Charleston–Huntington	West Virginia	WLPX-TV	29
Parkersburg	West Virginia	WTAP-TV	15.5
Green Bay	Wisconsin	WGBA-TV	26.4
La Crosse–Eau Claire	Wisconsin	WKBT-DT	8.3
Madison	Wisconsin	WIFS	57
Milwaukee	Wisconsin	WPXE-TV	55
Wausau	Wisconsin	WTPX-TV	46
Cheyenne	Wyoming	KLWY	27.4

== See also ==
- List of Ion Plus affiliates
- List of PBS member stations
- List of The CW affiliates
- List of Fox Broadcasting Company affiliates
- List of American Broadcasting Company television affiliates
- List of CBS television affiliates
- List of NBC television affiliates
- List of independent television stations in the United States
