= List of Ion Plus affiliates =

The following is a list of affiliates for Ion Plus, a digital subchannel network owned by the Scripps Networks division of the E. W. Scripps Company.

== Affiliates ==
=== Nationwide ===
Streaming feeds of Ion Plus
Provider	Channel	Notes
The Roku Channel	533	National FAST channel feed
Samsung TV Plus	1052	National FAST channel feed
Vizio WatchFree+	219	National FAST channel feed

=== Over the air ===
List of Ion Plus affiliates
Media market	State/District	Station	Channel
Birmingham	Alabama	WIAT	42.4
Dothan	Alabama	WTVY	4.6
Huntsville–Decatur	Alabama	WAFF	48.6
Montgomery	Alabama	WBMM	22.4
Anchorage	Alaska	KTBY	4.4
Phoenix	Arizona	KPPX-TV	51.5
Tucson	Arizona	KOLD-TV	13.4
Tucson	Arizona	KWBA-TV	58.5
Fayetteville	Arkansas	KHOG	29.4
Fort Smith	Arkansas	KHBS	40.4
Little Rock	Arkansas	KASN	38.4
Bakersfield	California	KXBF-LD	14.5
Chico	California	KKRM-LD	11.6
Los Angeles	California	KPXN-TV	30.3
Monterey–Salinas–Santa Cruz	California	KCBA	35.3
Monterey–Salinas–Santa Cruz	California	KCOY-TV	12.4
Palm Springs	California	K21DO-D	21.2
Redding	California	KRDT-CD	23.6
Sacramento–Stockton–Modesto	California	KSPX-TV	29.5
San Francisco–Oakland–San Jose	California	KKPX-TV	65.4
Santa Barbara	California	KZDF-LD	8.2
Yuba City	California	KKPM-CD	28.6
Denver	Colorado	KPXC-TV	59.4
Grand Junction–Montrose	Colorado	KLML	20.3
Hartford–New Haven	Connecticut	WHPX-TV	26.4
Washington	District of Columbia	WPXW-TV	66.5
Fort Myers	Florida	WGPS-LD	22.8
Gainesville	Florida	WNFT-LD	8.5
Jacksonville	Florida	WPXC-TV	21.5
Jacksonville	Florida	WTLV	12.4
Miami–Fort Lauderdale	Florida	WSFL-TV	39.4
Panama City Beach	Florida	WPCT	46.3
Orlando	Florida	WOPX-TV	56.4
Tampa–St. Petersburg	Florida	WXPX-TV	66.5
West Palm Beach	Florida	WPTV-TV	5.2
Atlanta	Georgia	WPXA-TV	14.2
Augusta	Georgia	WRDW-TV	12.6
Columbus	Georgia	W29FD-D	43.1
Macon	Georgia	WMGT-TV	41.3
Savannah	Georgia	WJCL	22.4
Honolulu	Hawaii	KPXO-TV	66.4
Boise	Idaho	KTRV-TV	12.5
Pocatello–Idaho Falls	Idaho	KPIF	15.2
Chicago	Illinois	WCPX-TV	38.5
Rockford	Illinois	WIFR-LD	23.6
Springfield	Illinois	WAND	17.4
Evansville	Indiana	WFIE	14.7
Fort Wayne	Indiana	WINM	12.5
Indianapolis	Indiana	WIPX-TV	63.5
South Bend	Indiana	WNDU-TV	16.5
Cedar Rapids	Iowa	KPXR-TV	48.5
Des Moines	Iowa	KFPX-TV	39.2
Sioux City	Iowa	KSXE-LD	16.2
Topeka	Kansas	KSQA	12.3
Wichita	Kansas	KAKE	10.4
Lexington	Kentucky	WUPX-TV	67.5
Louisville	Kentucky	WBKI	58.6
Baton Rouge	Louisiana	WAFB	9.6
Lake Charles	Louisiana	KVHP	29.5
New Orleans	Louisiana	WPXL-TV	49.4
Shreveport	Louisiana	KSLA	12.6
Portland	Maine	WIPL	35.5
Baltimore	Maryland	WMJF-CD	39.5
Salisbury	Maryland	WOWZ-LD	33.4
Boston	Massachusetts	WBPX-TV	68.5
Springfield	Massachusetts	WSHM-LD	33.5
Cadillac–Traverse City	Michigan	WFQX-TV	32.6
Detroit	Michigan	WPXD-TV	31.2
Flint	Michigan	WAQP	49.7
Grand Rapids	Michigan	WXMI	17.4
Duluth	Minnesota	WDIO-DT	10.4
Minneapolis–Saint Paul	Minnesota	KSTP-TV	5.8
Rochester	Minnesota	KAAL	6.3
Biloxi–Gulfport	Mississippi	WXXV-TV	5.4
Greenville–Greenwood	Mississippi	WFXW	15.4
Jackson	Mississippi	WDBD	40.5
Meridian	Mississippi	WMDN	24.7
Tupelo–Columbus	Mississippi	WLOV-TV	27.3
Cape Girardeau	Missouri	KBSI	23.4
Columbia–Jefferson City	Missouri	KGKM-LD	36.4
Kansas City	Missouri	KPXE-TV	50.3
Springfield	Missouri	KYCW-LD	24.2
St. Louis	Missouri	WRBU	46.4
Billings	Montana	KTVQ	2.4
Lincoln	Nebraska	KLKN	8.5
Omaha	Nebraska	KETV	7.4
Las Vegas	Nevada	KMCC	34.5
Reno	Nevada	KTVN	2.4
Concord–Manchester	New Hampshire	WPXG-TV	21.5
Albuquerque–Santa Fe	New Mexico	KOB	4.5
Farmington	New Mexico	KOBF	12.5
Roswell	New Mexico	KOBR	8.5
Albany	New York	WYPX-TV	55.5
Buffalo–Rochester	New York	WPXJ-TV	51.5
Elmira	New York	WYDC	48.7
New York City	New York	WPXN-TV	31.5
Plattsburgh	New York	WPTZ	5.4
Rochester	New York	WHEC-TV	10.7
Syracuse	New York	WSPX-TV	56.5
Watertown	New York	WWNY-TV	7.3
Charlotte	North Carolina	WBTV	3.4
Charlotte	North Carolina	WWJS	14.5
Greensboro–High Point	North Carolina	WGPX-TV	16.5
Greenville	North Carolina	WEPX-TV	38.5
Jacksonville	North Carolina	WPXU-TV	35.5
Raleigh–Durham	North Carolina	WRPX-TV	47.3
Wilmington	North Carolina	WWAY	3.4
Bismarck	North Dakota	KBMY	17.5
Fargo	North Dakota	WDAY-TV	6.5
Cleveland	Ohio	WEWS-TV	5.4
Columbus	Ohio	WBNS-TV	10.8
Toledo	Ohio	WUPW	36.5
Oklahoma City	Oklahoma	KSBI	52.5
Tulsa	Oklahoma	KJRH-TV	2.4
Portland	Oregon	KPXG-TV	22.4
Altoona	Pennsylvania	WKBS-TV	47.6
Erie	Pennsylvania	WSEE-TV	36.6
Harrisburg	Pennsylvania	WGAL	8.5
Philadelphia	Pennsylvania	WPPX-TV	61.2
Pittsburgh	Pennsylvania	WINP-TV	16.4
Scranton–Wilkes-Barre	Pennsylvania	WQPX-TV	64.5
Providence	Rhode Island	WLNE-TV	6.4
Columbia	South Carolina	WZRB	47.5
Greenville	South Carolina	WGGS-TV	16.4
Myrtle Beach	South Carolina	WMBF-TV	32.7
Sioux Falls	South Dakota	KTTW	7.7
Chattanooga	Tennessee	WRCB	3.4
Knoxville	Tennessee	WKNX-TV	7.3
Memphis	Tennessee	WPXX-TV	50.4
Nashville	Tennessee	WTVF	5.4
Amarillo	Texas	KEYU	31.7
Austin	Texas	KBVO	14.4
Dallas–Fort Worth	Texas	KPXD-TV	68.2
El Paso	Texas	KVIA-TV	7.6
Houston	Texas	KPXB-TV	49.4
Laredo	Texas	KGNS-TV	8.6
Lubbock	Texas	KCBD	11.7
Nacogdoches	Texas	KYTX	19.6
Odessa–Midland	Texas	KWWT	30.6
Port Arthur–Beaumont	Texas	KGEW-LD	33.2
San Angelo	Texas	KIDY	6.6
San Antonio	Texas	KPXL-TV	26.5
Waco–Temple	Texas	KCEN-TV	6.7
Wichita Falls	Texas	KAUZ-TV	6.6
Salt Lake City	Utah	KUPX-TV	16.5
Grundy	Virginia	WLFG	68.2
Norfolk–Portsmouth	Virginia	WPXV-TV	49.4
Richmond	Virginia	WPXR-TV	38.5
Seattle–Tacoma	Washington	KWPX-TV	33.5
Spokane	Washington	KGPX-TV	34.5
Charleston–Huntington	West Virginia	WLPX-TV	29.5
Clarksburg	West Virginia	W24ER-D	21.6
Martinsburg	West Virginia	WWPX-TV	60.5
Eau Claire–La Crosse	Wisconsin	WEAU	13.5
Green Bay	Wisconsin	WGBA-TV	26.2
Madison	Wisconsin	WIFS	27.6
Milwaukee	Wisconsin	WPXE-TV	55.5
Cheyenne	Wyoming	KLWY	27.7

== See also ==
- List of stations owned and operated by Ion Media
- List of Ion Television affiliates
