= List of Bounce TV affiliates =

The following is a list of affiliates for Bounce TV, a digital subchannel network owned by the Scripps Networks division of the E. W. Scripps Company.

== Affiliates ==
List of Bounce TV affiliates
Media market	State/District	Station	Channel
Birmingham–Tuscaloosa–Anniston	Alabama	WBRC	6.2
Gulf Shores–Mobile	Alabama	WFNA	55.2
Huntsville–Decatur	Alabama	WAFF	48.2
Montgomery	Alabama	WSFA	12.2
Ozark–Dothan	Alabama	WDFX-TV	34.2
Anchorage	Alaska	KLDY-LD	41.3
Anchorage	Alaska	KBLT-LD	31.3
Phoenix	Arizona	KTVW-DT	33.4
Tolleson	Arizona	KPPX-TV	51.2
Tucson	Arizona	KGUN-TV	9.4
Fort Smith–Fayetteville	Arkansas	KFTA-TV	24.4
Fort Smith–Fayetteville	Arkansas	KXNW	34.4
Little Rock	Arkansas	KARZ-TV	42.2
Bakersfield	California	KERO-TV	23.5
Chico	California	KKRM-LD	11.5
Fresno	California	KSEE	24.2
Los Angeles	California	KILM	64.1
Monterey–Salinas	California	KMMD-CD	39.2
Palm Springs	California	KPSE-LD	50.3
Redding	California	KRDT-CD	23.5
Sacramento–Stockton–Modesto	California	KSPX-TV	29.4
San Diego	California	KGTV	10.2
San Francisco–Oakland–San Jose	California	KKPX-TV	65.2
Santa Barbara–Santa Maria–San Luis Obispo	California	KEYT-TV	3.4
Yuba City	California	KKPM-CD	28.5
Denver	Colorado	KPXC-TV	59.2
Grand Junction	Colorado	KREX-TV	5.4
Hartford–New Haven	Connecticut	WHPX-TV	26.2
Washington	District of Columbia	WPXW-TV	66.2
Fort Myers	Florida	WFTX-TV	36.2
Gainesville	Florida	WNFT-LD	8
Jacksonville	Florida	WCWJ	17.2
Miami–Fort Lauderdale	Florida	WAMI-DT	69.2
Miami–Fort Lauderdale	Florida	WPXM-TV	35.2
Orlando	Florida	WOPX-TV	56.2
Orlando	Florida	WVEN-TV	43.3
Panama City	Florida	WPGX	28.2
Tallahassee	Florida	WTXL-TV	27.2
Tampa	Florida	WFTS-TV	28.2
Tampa	Florida	WVEA-TV	50.2
West Palm Beach	Florida	WFLX	29.2
Albany	Georgia	WALB	10.3
Atlanta	Georgia	WSB-TV	2.2
Augusta	Georgia	WFXG	54.2
Columbus	Georgia	WTVM	9.2
Macon	Georgia	WMGT-TV	41.2
Savannah	Georgia	WTOC-TV	11.2
Honolulu	Hawaii	KGMB	5.4
Boise	Idaho	KIVI-TV	6.4
Champaign	Illinois	WCIA	3.3
Chicago	Illinois	WCPX-TV	38.2
Peoria–Bloomington	Illinois	WMBD-TV	31.2
Rockford	Illinois	WQRF-TV	39.2
Evansville	Indiana	WTVW	7.2
Fort Wayne	Indiana	WFFT-TV	55.2
Indianapolis	Indiana	WCLJ-TV	42
South Bend	Indiana	WSJV	28.6
Terre Haute	Indiana	WAWV-TV	38.3
Davenport	Iowa	KLJB	18.4
Cedar Rapids	Iowa	KPXR-TV	48.3
Sioux City	Iowa	KCAU-TV	9.4
Topeka	Kansas	KSNT	27.4
Wichita	Kansas	KAKE	10.3
Wichita	Kansas	KAGW-CD	26.2
Bowling Green	Kentucky	WCZU-LD	39.3
Lexington	Kentucky	WLEX-TV	18.3
Louisville	Kentucky	WAVE	3.2
Paducah	Kentucky	W29CI-D	29
Alexandria	Louisiana	WNTZ-TV	48.2
Baton Rouge	Louisiana	WAFB	9.2
Lake Charles	Louisiana	KPLC	7.3
Lafayette	Louisiana	KATC	3.5
Monroe	Louisiana	KARD	14.2
New Orleans	Louisiana	WVUE-DT	8.2
Shreveport	Louisiana	KSLA	12.3
Portland	Maine	WIPL	35.3
Baltimore	Maryland	WMAR-TV	2.3
Salisbury	Maryland	WGDV-LD	32.2
Boston	Massachusetts	WBPX-TV	68.4
Detroit	Michigan	WXYZ-TV	7.2
Escanaba–Marquette	Michigan	WJMN-TV	3.4
Grand Rapids	Michigan	WXMI	17.3
Lansing	Michigan	WSYM-TV	47.3
Traverse City–Cadillac	Michigan	WFQX-TV	32.7
Minneapolis–Saint Paul	Minnesota	KPXM-TV	41.2
Minneapolis–Saint Paul	Minnesota	K33LN-D	33
Biloxi–Gulfport	Mississippi	WLOX	13.3
Cleveland	Mississippi	WHCQ-LD	8.2
Jackson	Mississippi	WLBT	3.2
Laurel–Hattiesburg	Mississippi	WDAM-TV	7.3
Meridian	Mississippi	WMDN	24.2
Columbia–Jefferson City	Missouri	KMIZ	17.5
Joplin	Missouri	KODE-TV	12.3
Kansas City	Missouri	KMCI-TV	38.2
St. Joseph	Missouri	KNPG-LD	21.4
St. Louis	Missouri	WRBU	46.2
Springfield	Missouri	KOZL-TV	27.3
Omaha	Nebraska	KAJS-LD	32.2
Las Vegas	Nevada	KMCC	34.6
Reno	Nevada	KRNS-CD	46.4
Concord–Manchester	New Hampshire	WPXG-TV	21.4
Albuquerque	New Mexico	KRQE	13.3
Roswell	New Mexico	KBIM-TV	10.3
Albany	New York	WYPX-TV	55.2
Buffalo	New York	WKBW-TV	7.2
New York City	New York	WPXN-TV	31.2
Rochester	New York	WROC-TV	8.2
Syracuse	New York	WSYR-TV	9.3
Utica	New York	WUTR	20.4
Archer Lodge	North Carolina	WFPX-TV	62
Charlotte	North Carolina	WBTV	3.2
Greensboro–Winston-Salem	North Carolina	WCWG	20.4
Greenville–New Bern	North Carolina	WYDO	14.2
Raleigh	North Carolina	WUVC-DT	40.3
Wilmington	North Carolina	WECT	6.2
Bismarck	North Dakota	KNDB	26.5
Fargo–Grand Forks	North Dakota	KRDK-TV	4.5
Minot	North Dakota	KNDB	24.5
Cincinnati	Ohio	WCPO-DT3	9.3
Cleveland	Ohio	WDLI-TV	17.1
Columbus	Ohio	WQMC-LD	23
Columbus	Ohio	WSFJ-TV	51
Dayton	Ohio	WBDT	26.2
Toledo	Ohio	WUPW	36.2
Youngstown	Ohio	WYFX-LD	32.4
Oklahoma City	Oklahoma	KOPX-TV	62.2
Oklahoma City	Oklahoma	KSBI	52.2
Tulsa	Oklahoma	KJRH-TV	2.2
Bend	Oregon	KTVZ	21.5
Portland	Oregon	KPXG-TV	22.2
Erie	Pennsylvania	WFXP	66.3
Harrisburg	Pennsylvania	WHLZ-LD	19
Johnstown–Altoona	Pennsylvania	WKBS-TV	47.3
Philadelphia	Pennsylvania	WUVP-DT	65.2
Pittsburgh	Pennsylvania	WINP-TV	16.2
Pittsburgh	Pennsylvania	WPCB-TV	40.3
Scranton-Wilkes-Barre	Pennsylvania	WQPX-TV	64.2
Providence	Rhode Island	WLWC	28.1
Charleston	South Carolina	WCSC-TV	5.2
Columbia	South Carolina	WIS	10.3
Greenville	South Carolina	WHNS	21.4
Myrtle Beach	South Carolina	WMBF-TV	32.2
Chattanooga	Tennessee	WDEF-TV	12.2
Jackson	Tennessee	WYJJ-LD	27.2
Kingsport–Johnson City–Bristol	Tennessee	WAPK-CD	36.3
Knoxville	Tennessee	WTNZ	43.2
Memphis	Tennessee	WMC-TV	5.2
Nashville	Tennessee	WTVF	5.3
Abilene–Sweetwater	Texas	KRBC-TV	9.4
Amarillo	Texas	KCIT	14.4
Austin	Texas	KBVO	14.2
Beaumont	Texas	KUMY-LD	22.3
Dallas–Fort Worth	Texas	KUVN-DT	23.2
El Paso	Texas	KINT-TV	26.4
Harlingen	Texas	KCWT-CD	21.2
Houston	Texas	KPXB-TV	49.2
Lubbock	Texas	KAMC	28.3
Midland–Odessa	Texas	KWES-TV	9.2
San Angelo	Texas	KSAN-TV	3.3
San Antonio	Texas	KOBS-LD	19
Tyler	Texas	KLTV-DT2	7.2
Waco	Texas	KWKT-TV	44.4
Wichita Falls	Texas	KJTL	18.3
Salt Lake City	Utah	KBTU-LD	23.3
Salt Lake City	Utah	KUPX-TV	16.4
Burlington	Vermont	WFFF-TV	44.3
Norfolk	Virginia	WTKR	3.3
Richmond	Virginia	WUPV	65.2
Roanoke	Virginia	WFXR	27.3
Bellevue–Seattle–Tacoma	Washington	KWPX-TV	33.3
Spokane	Washington	KGPX-TV	34.2
Charleston	West Virginia	WLPX-TV	29.3
Charleston	West Virginia	WOCW-LD	21.2
Martinsburg	West Virginia	WWPX-TV	60.2
Eau Claire	Wisconsin	WLAX	48.4
Green Bay	Wisconsin	WFRV-TV	5.2
Milwaukee	Wisconsin	WTMJ-TV	4.2
Milwaukee	Wisconsin	WPXE-TV	55.2
Madison	Wisconsin	WIFS	57.4
Wausau	Wisconsin	WTPX-TV	46.5
