= 1998 in American television =

In American television in 1998, notable events included television series debuts, finales, cancellations, and channel initiations, closures and rebrandings, as well as information about controversies and disputes.

== Events ==
=== January ===
Date	Event
3	Jim McKay announces that Wide World of Sports has been cancelled by ABC after 37 years.
12	CBS acquires the rights to the AFC of the NFL as part of a $4 billion, eight-year contract; Fox and ABC renew their agreements for the NFC and Monday Night Football, respectively (Super Bowl XXXII, broadcast on January 25, would be NBC's last NFL game until 2006).
15	Many of Sinclair's stations that were previously affiliated with UPN were converted to affiliates of The WB.
30	CBS affiliate in Orlando, WCPX-TV changes its name to WKMG-TV following its purchase by Post-Newsweek.

=== February ===
Date	Event
9	Prevue Channel (now Pop) revamps its programming to include short-form segments. The revamp lasts until January 31, 1999, when the channel is renamed TV Guide Channel.

=== March ===
Date	Event
2	Cartoon Network introduces a new on-air branding package produced by Primal Screen, which frequently incorporated Raymond Scott's song "Powerhouse", and would last for six years.
18	A wanted child molester named Matthew Fenwick appears as a contestant on the game show Wheel of Fortune and wins $4,400. At the time of the episode's airing, Matthew was on the run after being accused of molesting two underage girls, ages 8 and 10, who discovered Matthew on the game show after a warrant was issued for him in November 1997 by the police. He was arrested two days after his appearance on the game show and subsequently pled guilty in July 1998 for two counts of aggravated indecent liberties with a child.
29	World Wrestling Federation wrestler Stone Cold Steve Austin defeats Shawn Michaels, winning his first WWF World Heavyweight Championship at WrestleMania XIV. With this, it has been cited to be the full beginning of the "Attitude Era".

=== April ===
Date	Event
4	The 1998 Kids' Choice Awards air on Nickelodeon, hosted by Rosie O'Donnell. Television winners included Kenan & Kel (for "Favorite TV Show"), Jonathan Taylor Thomas (of Home Improvement for "Favorite TV Actor"), Melissa Joan Hart (of Sabrina the Teenage Witch for "Favorite TV Actress") and Rugrats (for "Favorite Cartoon"). A half-hour sneak preview of CatDog follows the ceremony.
6	Long-running British children's television series Teletubbies begins its U.S. television debut on PBS Kids.
9	The Price Is Right's 5,000th episode is broadcast on CBS. On the show, every pricing game is played for a car (something Price had only done once before. It has been repeated only once since then). At the beginning of the show, CBS announces it has renamed Studio 33 (the studio at CBS Television City where The Price Is Right has taped since its 1972 return) the Bob Barker Studios in honor of the show's then-host and executive producer.
11	The National Cable Television Association announces they will discontinue the CableACE awards, due to the Emmy Awards recognizing cable programming.
30	Seven television stations broadcast the suicide of maintenance worker Daniel V. Jones on live television. The incident causes many to criticize Los Angeles television stations' practice of airing police pursuits live and calls for proposed changes in the way live coverage of events are handled in the future.

=== May ===
Date	Event
7	The infamous Seinfeld episode, "The Puerto Rican Day" is broadcast on NBC. In it, Cosmo Kramer accidentally burns and then stomps on the Puerto Rican flag. NBC was forced to apologize and had it banned from airing on the network again. Also, it was not initially part of the syndicated package. In the summer of 2002, the episode started to appear with the flag-burning sequence intact.
14	76.3 million people tune in to The Finale of Seinfeld on NBC.
28	Former Saturday Night Live actor and comedian Phil Hartman, then featuring on the NBC sitcom NewsRadio, the Fox animated sitcom The Simpsons, and announcer of Cartoon Network is shot and killed by his wife (who then kills herself).

=== June ===
Date	Event
1	The anime Sailor Moon debuts on Cartoon Network's after school programming block, Toonami.
11	United Video Satellite Group, parent company of the Prevue Channel (now Pop), acquires TV Guide from News Corporation for $800 million and 60 million shares of stock worth an additional $1.2 billion. In recognition of this, Prevue Channel will rebrand to the TV Guide Channel on February 1, 1999.
14	Game 6 of the NBA Finals between the Chicago Bulls and Utah Jazz is broadcast on NBC. The game registered a 22.3 Nielsen rating and 38 share with average 35.9 million viewers. This made it the highest rated and most watched game in the history of the National Basketball Association. 72 million people in the US watched at least part of the game. The previous record was a 21.2 rating and 37 share for Game 7 of the 1988 NBA Finals between the Los Angeles Lakers and Detroit Pistons on CBS.

=== August ===
Date	Event
3	The feud between UPN and Sinclair Broadcast Group has been ended, with many of the Milwaukee, Birmingham, Raleigh and Charleston stations that were temporary independent stations went back to being UPN affiliates.
15	A pre-season football game in Vancouver, British Columbia between the San Francisco 49ers and Seattle Seahawks is CBS's first NFL football broadcast since January 1994.
16	KATH-LP in Juneau, Alaska signs on the air, giving the Juneau market its first full-time NBC affiliate. The sign-on was delayed for a month due to delays in receiving the equipment required to place the station on the local GCI cable system (Sister station KSCT-LP in Sitka, the market's former Fox affiliate, had already switched to NBC).

=== September ===
Date	Event
6	CBS resumes its regular season coverage of the National Football League for the first time since 1993.
7	The Pokémon anime debuts in first run syndication with the episode "Battle aboard the St. Anne", which aired as a sneak peek. The series would make official debut the next day with the episode "Pokémon, I Choose You!".
8	In front of a nationwide audience watching on Fox, Mark McGwire hits his 62nd home run of the Major League Baseball season, breaking the 37 year old record held by Roger Maris.
13	The 50th Primetime Emmy Awards is broadcast on NBC. The NBC sitcom Frasier is announced as the winner of Outstanding Comedy Series, becoming the first show to win one of the two main series prizes for five consecutive years. Meanwhile, ABC's The Practice would win the award Outstanding Drama Series. This is to date, the last Primetime Emmy Awards ceremony where all the nominees for Outstanding Drama Series are from the broadcast networks. The following year, HBO's The Sopranos would become the first cable television series to be nominated for Outstanding Drama Series.
17	Frasier appears for the first time on Thursday nights in the 9:00 slot, NBC had been discussing in May, displacing Seinfeld, although Just Shoot Me! has been moved to Tuesdays two days earlier. The show produced new episodes in its slot next week.
21	The pilot episode for The King of Queens is broadcast on CBS.

=== October ===
Date	Event
4	UPN adds two additional nights of programming to its schedule with primetime series added to Friday nights, including a movie block on Thursday nights.
8	Friends reaches the 100 episode mark, the episode "The One Hundredth" is originally broadcast on NBC.
21	Fox broadcasts the Game 4 of its second World Series. The New York Yankees defeat the San Diego Padres, winning their 24th championship and second since 1996.
19	Fox Family Channel debuts its new annual event 13 Nights of Halloween.

=== November ===
Date	Event
8	The Milwaukee, Raleigh, Birmingham and Charleston stations owned by Sinclair Broadcast Group air many Star Trek: Voyager episodes viewers left out of the last season, with the permission of UPN and Paramount Television.
16	Sesame Street's 30th season premiere introduces a revised set, the human character Alan, and the segment Elmo's World.
18	The Powerpuff Girls is set premiere on Cartoon Network. That was Hanna-Barbera’s last series.
20	The Rugrats Movie, based on Nickelodeon's hit series Rugrats is released in theaters. The movie introduces the character of Dil Pickles, who became a main character in Rugrats the following January. The Rugrats Movie was a commercial success, making a grand total of $100,494,675 domestically and another $40,400,000 in international markets. To promote the movie, Nickelodeon put all Rugrats episodes on hiatus for the week. It was the first time since 1994 that Rugrats was not part of Nick's daily schedule.

=== December ===
Date	Event

== Programs ==
=== Debuts ===
Date	Show	Network
January 1	A Baby Story	TLC
January 3	The Magnificent Seven	CBS
January 4	Ask Harriet	Fox
January 5	The Charlie Horse Music Pizza	PBS Kids
January 8	Crime Stories	Court TV
January 8	WCW Thunder	TBS
January 15	Prey	ABC
January 15	Style & Substance	CBS
January 20	Dawson's Creek	The WB
January 24	ABC News Saturday Night	ABC
January 26	Special Report with Bret Baier	Fox News Channel
January 30	Jep!	Game Show Network
February 1	Fox & Friends	Fox News Channel
February 2	Three	The WB
February 6	Power Rangers in Space	Fox Kids
February 7	Silver Surfer	Fox Kids
February 23	The Closer	CBS
February 24	Four Corners	CBS
February 28	Bug Juice	Disney Channel
March 9	House Rules	NBC
March 10	That's Life	ABC
March 10	Two Guys, a Girl and a Pizza Place	ABC
March 10	Weather Center	The Weather Channel
March 11	Significant Others	Fox
March 14	PB&J Otter	Playhouse Disney
March 17	For Your Love	NBC
March 17	LateLine	NBC
March 24	True Life	MTV
April 2	World's Wildest Police Videos	Fox
April 4	CatDog	Nickelodeon
April 6	Getting Personal	Fox
April 6	Push	ABC
April 6	Teletubbies	PBS Kids
April 9	Mysteries and Scandals	E!
April 13	Love Boat: The Next Wave	UPN
April 19	You're the One	The WB
April 20	Kelly Kelly	The WB
May 11	Call for Help	ZDTV
May 11	Internet Tonight	ZDTV
May 11	The Screen Savers	ZDTV
May 11	Silicon Spin	ZDTV
May 14	Celebrity Deathmatch	MTV
May 25	Say What? Karaoke	MTV
June 1	The Challenge	MTV
June 3	The Simple Life	CBS
June 6	Sex and the City	HBO
June 6	Today's Homeowner with Danny Lipford	Syndication
June 8	Invasion America	The WB
June 8	Forgive or Forget	Syndication
June 22	The Howie Mandel Show	Syndication
June 22	Faux Pause	Game Show Network
July 4	X-Play	ZDTV
July 13	The Sifl and Olly Show	MTV
July 16	Fox Files	Fox
July 18	Bad Dog	Fox Family
July 18	The Net	USA Network
July 19	Sins of the City	USA Network
July 19	Oh Yeah! Cartoons	Nickelodeon
August 1	Linc's	Showtime
August 2	WWE Heat	USA Network
August 3	You're On!	Nickelodeon
August 5	Whose Line Is It Anyway?	ABC
August 15	I Can't Believe You Said That	Fox Family
August 15	Outrageous!	Fox Family
August 17	Judge Mills Lane	Syndication
August 17	Welcome to Paradox	Sci-Fi Channel
August 18	Any Day Now	Lifetime
August 18	Maggie	Lifetime
August 18	Ohh Nooo! Mr. Bill Presents	Fox Family
August 22	The Howard Stern Radio Show	CBS
August 23	Holding the Baby	Fox
August 23	That '70s Show	Fox
August 26	Oh Baby	Lifetime
August 31	Hercules	Disney Channel and ABC
August 31	Great Day America	PAX TV
August 31	The Reel to Reel Picture Show	PAX TV
August 31	Woman's Day	PAX TV
September 1	Book TV	C-SPAN2
September 1	NFL Live	ESPN2
September 1	Cousin Skeeter	Nickelodeon
September 1	The Wild Thornberrys	Nickelodeon
September 5	The Secret Files of the Spy Dogs	Fox Kids
September 6	It's a Miracle	PAX TV
September 7	The Mystic Knights of Tir Na Nog	Fox Kids
September 9	First Wave	Sci-Fi Channel
September 11	Living in Captivity	Fox
September 12	Animorphs	Nickelodeon
September 12	One World	NBC
September 12	Godzilla: The Series	Fox Kids
September 12	Mad Jack the Pirate	Fox Kids
September 12	The Mr. Potato Head Show	Fox Kids
September 12	Young Hercules	Fox Kids
September 12	Voltron: The Third Dimension	Syndication
September 13	The Army Show	The WB
September 14	Judge Joe Brown	Syndication
September 14	The Roseanne Show	Syndication
September 14	Total Request Live	MTV
September 14	Histeria!	Kids' WB
September 15	Costello	Fox
September 19	Pinky, Elmyra & the Brain	Kids' WB
September 21	The Brian Benben Show	CBS
September 21	The King of Queens	CBS
September 21	L.A. Doctors	CBS
September 21	Change of Heart	Syndication
September 21	Donny & Marie	Syndication
September 21	Hyperion Bay	The WB
September 21	Conrad Bloom	NBC
September 21	Will & Grace	NBC
September 22	Encore! Encore!	NBC
September 22	The Hughleys	ABC
September 22	Sports Night	ABC
September 24	Jesse	NBC
September 25	Buddy Faro	CBS
September 25	Brother's Keeper	ABC
September 25	Two of a Kind	ABC
September 26	Cupid	ABC
September 26	Fantasy Island	ABC
September 26	Martial Law	CBS
September 26	V.I.P.	Syndication
September 28	The Cut	MTV
September 29	Vengeance Unlimited	ABC
September 29	Felicity	The WB
September 30	The Secret Lives of Men	ABC
September 30	Maggie Winters	CBS
September 30	To Have & to Hold	CBS
October 2	Friday Night Fights	ESPN2
October 2	Off the Wall	Disney Channel
October 3	Birdz	CBS
October 3	Flying Rhino Junior High	CBS
October 3	Mortal Kombat: Konquest	Syndication
October 3	Anatole	CBS
October 3	Dumb Bunnies	CBS
October 4	Air America	Syndication
October 4	Rolie Polie Olie	Playhouse Disney
October 5	Inquizition	Game Show Network
October 5	Noddy	PBS Kids
October 5	DiResta	UPN
October 5	Guys Like Us	UPN
October 5	The Secret Diary of Desmond Pfeiffer	UPN
October 6	Mercy Point	UPN
October 7	Charmed	The WB
October 7	Out of the Box	Playhouse Disney
October 7	Seven Days	UPN
October 9	Legacy	UPN
October 10	Brats of the Lost Nebula	Kids' WB
October 11	Malibu, CA	Syndication
October 16	Trinity	NBC
October 17	Wind on Water	NBC
October 19	The New Addams Family	Fox Family
October 20	The FBI Files	Discovery Channel
October 23	Brimstone	Fox
October 25	The Famous Jett Jackson	Disney Channel
October 27	America's Greatest Pets	UPN
October 27	Reunited	UPN
November 2	Becker	CBS
November 2	Jay Jay the Jet Plane	TLC
November 7	City Confidential	A&E
November 7	Little Men	PAX TV
November 7	Mythic Warriors	CBS
November 18	The Powerpuff Girls	Cartoon Network
December 1	Comedy Central Presents	Comedy Central

=== Ending this year ===
Date	Show	Debut
January 1	413 Hope St.	1997
January 1	Living Single	1993
January 3	Newton's Apple	1983
January 4	Inspector Gadget's Field Trip	1996
January 10	Jungle Cubs	1996
January 12	Jenny	1997
January 13	Dellaventura	1997
January 15	The Secret World of Alex Mack	1994
January 16	The Visitor	1997
January 22	Union Square	1997
January 24	Cracker	1997
January 29	Ask Harriet	1998
January 31	Spider-Man	1994
February 5	The Ink and Paint Club	1997
February 7	Wheel 2000	1997
February 8	Muppets Tonight	1996
February 9	Fired Up	1997
February 10	Make Me Laugh	1958
February 13	Teen Angel	1997
February 17	Grace Under Fire	1993
February 20	Channel Umptee-3	1997
February 23	Bobby's World	1990
February 27	The Gregory Hines Show	1997
March 2	Sparks	1996
March 2	Big Bad Beetleborgs	1996
March 3	Four Corners	1998
March 4	101 Dalmatians: The Series	1997
March 6	Hiller and Diller	1997
March 7	Gadget Boy & Heather	1995
March 7	USA Up All Night	1989
March 14	Nothing Scared	1997
March 15	The Tom Show	1997
March 16	George & Leo	1997
March 20	Ninja Turtles: The Next Mutation	1997
March 21	Fame L.A.	1997
March 25	Significant Others	1998
March 27	Big Bag	1996
April 17	Players	1997
April 25	The Adventures of Sam & Max: Freelance Police	1997
April 26	You're the One	1998
April 27	Brooklyn South	1997
April 27	Tots TV	1993
May 3	Alright Already	1997
May 3	Nick Freno: Licensed Teacher	1996
May 4	The Closer	1998
May 14	Seinfeld	1989
May 15	The Wubbulous World of Dr. Seuss	1996
May 16	Dr. Quinn, Medicine Woman	1993
May 16	Silver Surfer	1998
May 18	Murphy Brown (returned in 2018)	1988
May 18	Team Knight Rider	1997
May 19	Good News	1997
May 22	Singled Out	1995
May 25	The Naked Truth	1995
May 26	Soul Man	1997
May 31	Sleepwalkers	1997
May 31	The Larry Sanders Show	1992
June 7	Kelly Kelly	1998
June 12	Geraldo	1987
June 15	Dexter's Laboratory (returned in 2001)	1996
June 15	Michael Hayes	1997
June 20	Bill Nye the Science Guy	1993
June 23	You Wish	1997
June 23	Cartoon Sushi	1997
June 25	New York Undercover	1994
June 26	Step by Step	1991
July 2	C-16: FBI	1997
July 7	Invasion America	1998
July 8	The Simple Life	1998
July 9	Prey	1998
July 13	Cybill	1995
July 17	Family Matters	1989
July 18	Timecop	1997
July 22	Ellen	1994
July 25	Weird Science	1994
August 6	Push	1998
August 14	Shop 'til You Drop (returned in 2000)	1991
August 14	Debt	1996
August 14	Shopping Spree	1996
August 25	USA Tuesday Night Fights	1982
September 2	Style & Substance	1998
September 3	The Statler Brothers Show	1991
September 12	Think CBS Kidz	1997
September 20	NBC Nightside	1991
September 23	The RuPaul Show	1996
October 2	Wishbone	1995
October 2	The Reel to Reel Picture Show	1998
October 12	The Brian Benben Show	1998
October 13	Costello	1998
October 16	Getting Personal	1998
October 16	Living in Captivity	1998
October 17	Sins of the City	1998
October 17	The Spooktacular New Adventures of Casper	1996
October 28	The Secret Diary of Desmond Pfeiffer	1998
November 6	All Dogs Go to Heaven: The Series	1996
November 7	The Secret Lives of Men	1998
November 14	Animaniacs (returned in 2020)	1993
November 14	Pinky and the Brain	1995
November 16	Goosebumps	1995
November 17	Earth's Fury	1997
November 21	Power Rangers in Space	1998
November 25	Babylon 5	1994
December 4	The Puzzle Place	1995
December 4	Buddy Faro	1998
December 5	You're On!	1998
December 9	To Have & to Hold	1998
December 12	The Cut	1998
December 12	The New Adventures of Zorro	1997
December 13	The Army Show	1998
December 13	The New Adventures of Robin Hood	1997
December 15	Holding the Baby	1998
December 20	The Mystery Files of Shelby Woo	1996
December 21	Conrad Bloom	1998
December 28	Mr. Show with Bob and David	1995
December 29	Reunited	1998
December 31	This Week in Baseball	1977

=== Entering syndication this year ===
Show	Seasons	In production	Source
Chicago Hope	September 14, 1998 - August 18, 2002	Yes	
Dave's World	September 14, 1998 - August 27, 2000	No	
Diagnosis: Murder	September 21, 1998 - April 8, 2005	Yes	
Disney's Doug	September 7, 1998 - September 2, 2001	Yes	
ER	September 14, 1998 - September 1, 2006	Yes	
Friends	September 14, 1998-present	Yes	
The Nanny	September 14, 1998 - August 8, 2004	Yes	
New York Undercover	September 21, 1998 - July 16, 2004	No	
Newsradio	September 14, 1998 - June 23, 2013	Yes	
Sister, Sister	September 28, 1998 - August 19, 2005	Yes	
This Old House	September 5, 1998 - May 27, 2018	Yes	
Touched by an Angel	September 7, 1998 - July 11, 2004	Yes	

=== Returning this year ===
Show	Last aired	Previous network	New title	New network	Date of return
Kids Say the Darndest Things	1995	CBS	Same	Same	January 9
The NFL Today	1994	CBS	Same	Same	September 6
Disney's Brand Spanking New! Doug	1997	ABC	Disney's Doug	ABC/Syndication	September 12
Hollywood Squares	1989	Syndication	Same	Same	September 14
Love Connection	1994	Syndication	Same	Same	September 21
Match Game	1991	ABC	Same	Syndication	September 21

=== Changes of network affiliation ===
Show	Moved from	Moved to
For Your Love	NBC	The WB
TV's Bloopers & Practical Jokes	NBC	ABC
Sliders	Fox	Sci-Fi Channel
Magic Adventures of Mumfie	Fox Kids	Fox Family Channel
Flipper	Syndication	PAX TV
All Dogs Go to Heaven: The Series	Syndication	Fox Family Channel
All New Captain Kangaroo	Syndication	Fox Family Channel
Match Game	ABC	Syndication

=== Made-for-TV movies ===
Title	Network	Date of airing
Dallas: War of the Ewings	CBS	April 24
Halloweentown	Disney Channel	October 17

=== Miniseries ===
Title	Network	Date of airing
The Last Don II	CBS	May 3
Peter Benchley's Creature	ABC	May 17
Thanks of a Grateful Nation	Showtime	May 31

== Networks and services ==
=== Network launches ===
Network	Type	Launch date	Notes	Source
Zee TV	Cable television	Unknown		
Discovery en Espanol	Cable television	Unknown		
Showtime Extreme	Cable and satellite	March 10	Showtime Extreme, a multiplex channel from Showtime, airs action and adventure films, thrillers, gangster films and sporting events. The channel's launch coincided with Viacom's channels (excluding the Showtime networks) moving from USSB to DirecTV.	
BBC America	Cable and satellite	March 29	BBC Worldwide and Discovery Communications launched BBC America as part of a $565 million alliance to develop new channels and co-productions. The channel carried British drama, comedy, and documentary programs and live news broadcasts from BBC World.	
Toon Disney	Cable and satellite	April 18	Toon Disney, devoted to carrying animated series and movies 24 hours a day, was launched by The Walt Disney Company on Disney Channel's 15th anniversary. The first program to air was "The Sorcerer's Apprentice" segment from Fantasia.	
ZDTV	Cable and satellite	May 11	A channel launched by Ziff Davis airing technology-based programs.	
CityVision	Cable television	June 8		
Lifetime Movie Network	Cable and satellite	June 29	A offshoot of Lifetime carrying made-for-TV movies aimed at women.	
Discovery Health Channel	Cable and satellite	July 1	Discovery Health Channel aired repeats of health-oriented programs from other Discovery networks, plus some original programming.	
Discovery Wings Channel	Cable and satellite	July 15	Named after the Discovery Channel series Wings, Discovery Wings Channel aired programs related to aircraft and aerospace. Discovery Wings also showed top-of-the-hour interstitials featuring aviation forecast data provided by the National Weather Service.	
MTV S MTVX; VH1 Country; VH1 Smooth; VH1 Soul	Digital cable	August 1	MTV Networks launches "The Suite from MTV and VH1", five music channels initially exclusive to digital cable.	
PAX	Over-the-air multicast	August 31	Paxson Communications launches PAX TV (now named Ion Television), a family-oriented broadcast network. Paxson's stations previously carried a number of paid programming services (as well as the overnight Christian block The Worship Network), branded as the Infomall Television Network until at the time of PAX's launch.	
The WB 100+ Station Group	Cable television	September 21	The WB launches its programming service of cable-only networks, branded as the 100+ Station Group. It was originally known as The WeB, which was from its launch until March of next year. Several cable providers that carried The WB's programming on WGN Superstation feed (until it was dropped the following September) were replaced by its own service.	
The Biography Channel	Cable and satellite	November 16	First announced in June 1996, The Biography Channel aired episodes of A&E's profile series Biography and related series.	
History Channel International	Cable and satellite	November 16	History Channel International broadcast programs focusing on world history, plus a selection of programs in foreign languages for the Cable in the Classroom initiative.	

=== Network conversions ===
Old network name	New network name	Type	Conversion Date	Notes	Source
CBS Eye on People	Eye on People	Cable and satellite	Unknown		
Nostalgia Good TV	Goodlife TV Network	Cable television	Unknown		
ESPN Classic	Classic Sports Network	Cable and satellite	January 1		
The Family Channel	Fox Family Channel	Cable and satellite	August 15	More than a year after its acquisition by News Corporation's Fox Kids Worldwide, Inc., The Family Channel is re-initiated as Fox Family Channel, with the network now targeting a younger family-oriented audience than that of its predecessor.	
HBO2	HBO Plus	Cable and satellite	October 1		
HBO3	HBO Signature	Cable and satellite	October 1		
Q2	Style Network	Cable and satellite	October 1	QVC shut down its Q2 network on October 1 and sold its satellite capacity to E!, who used the space to launch Style Network.	

=== Closures ===
Network	Type	Closure date	Notes	Source
American Sports Classics	Cable and satellite	Unknown		
Sega Channel	Online service	July 31		

== Television stations ==
=== Station launches ===
Date	Market	Station	Channel	Affiliation
January	Lake Worth/West Palm Beach, Florida	WPXP-TV	68	inTV
January 12	Laredo, Texas	K68FU	68	Vida Communications
February 2	Rochester, New York	WBGT-LP	40	UPN
March	Garden City, Kansas	KDCK	21	PBS; Smoky Hills PTV
April 21	Provo, Utah	KUPX-TV	16	inTV
May 18	Scranton/Wilkes-Barre, Pennsylvania	WSWB-TV	64	inTV
May 28	Clarksville, Tennessee	W69EC	69	Independent
June 1	Morehead/Lexington, Kentucky (now licensed in Richmond, Kentucky)	WAOM	67	UPN
June 15	Live Oak, Florida	WFXU	57	Fox
June 16	Wichita, Kansas	K53EO	53	America's Voice/ZDTV
July 10	Walla Walla, Washington	K33EJ	33	3ABN
July 15	Palo Alto/San Francisco, California	KTLN	68	Total Living Network
July 16	Pocatello/Idaho Falls, Idaho	KFXP	31	Fox
August 15	Helena, Montana	KMTF	10	Fox
August 17	Juneau, Alaska	K05JR	5	NBC
August 27	Albany, New York	WVBG-LP	25	Independent
August 31	Baton Rouge, Louisiana	K52CQ	52	PAX TV
August 31	Charlottesville, Virginia	WADA-LP	55	PAX TV
August 31	Newton/Des Moines, Iowa	KFPX-TV	39	PAX TV
August 31	Kaneoche/Honolulu, Hawaii	KPXO-TV	66	PAX TV
August 31	Huntington/Charleston, West Virginia	WLPX-TV	29	PAX TV
August 31	Shreveport, Louisiana	KPXJ	21	PAX TV
September 8	Mitchell, South Dakota	KDLV-TV	5	NBC
September 22	Lima, Ohio	W65DP	65	Fox (via WOHL-LP)
October 5	Charleston/Huntington, West Virginia	WHCP	30	The WB
October 5	Minneapolis/St. Paul, Minnesota	K35CY	35	HSN
October 8	Huntington, West Virginia	W53BJ	53	The WB (as a translator of WHCP)
October 19	Toledo, Ohio	WLMB	40	Religious independent
November 6	Bakersfield, California	K24EJ	24	Fox
November 24	Syracuse, New York	WSPX-TV	56	Pax TV
December 3	Nashville, Tennessee	W68CG	68	The Box
December 6	Salt Lake City, Utah	KAZG	24	Independent
December 4	Crandon/Wausau, Wisconsin	WBIJ-TV	4	FamilyNet
December 10	Monroe, Louisiana (El Dorado, Arkansas)	KAQY	11	ABC
December 15	Steubenville, Ohio	W28AS	28	Independent
Unknown date	Atlanta, Georgia	W20AI	20	ShopNBC
Unknown date	Mercer, Pennsylvania	WPXI-LP	17	Fox
Unknown date	Payette, Idaho	K17ED	17	3ABN
Unknown date	Scottsville, Kentucky	W48BM	48	Religious independent (primary); FamilyNet (secondary)
Unknown date	Winnemucca, Nevada	KWNV	7	NBC (satellite of KRNV/Reno)
Unknown date	Youngstown, Ohio	WYFX-LP	62 (now on 19)	Fox

=== Stations changing network affiliation ===
Market	Date	Station	Channel	Prior affiliation	New affiliation
Sacramento/Stockton/Modesto, California	January 5	KPWB/KMAX-TV	31	The WB	UPN
Sacramento/Stockton/Modesto, California	January 5	KQCA	58	UPN	The WB
Baltimore, Maryland	January 15	WNUV	54	UPN	The WB
Cincinnati, Ohio	January 15	WBQC-LP	25	The WB	Independent
Cincinnati, Ohio	January 15	WSTR-TV	64	UPN	The WB
Indianapolis, Indiana	January 15	WTTV/WTTK	4/29	UPN	Independent
Oklahoma City, Oklahoma	January 15	KOCB	34	UPN	The WB
Pittsburgh, Pennsylvania	January 15	WNPA	19	The WB	UPN
Pittsburgh, Pennsylvania	January 15	WCWB	22	UPN	The WB
Kansas City, Missouri	January 21	KSMO-TV	62	UPN	The WB
Baltimore, Maryland	January 20	WUTB	24	HSN	UPN
San Antonio, Texas	January 25	KRRT	35	UPN	The WB
Provo, Utah	August 31	KUPX-TV	16	inTV	Pax TV
Las Vegas, Nevada	March 1	KUPN	21	UPN	The WB
Las Vegas, Nevada	March 1	KFBT	33	The WB	Independent
Indianapolis, Indiana	April 6	WTTV/WTTK	4/29	Independent	The WB
Indianapolis, Indiana	April 6	WNDY-TV	23	The WB	UPN
Lake Worth/West Palm Beach, Florida	August 31	WPXP-TV	68	inTV	Pax TV
Oklahoma City, Oklahoma	June 15	KPSG	43	PBS	UPN
Norfolk, Virginia	August 1	WTVZ-TV	33	Fox	The WB
Norfolk, Virginia	August 1	WVBT	43	The WB	Fox
Raleigh, North Carolina	August 1	WLFL	22	Fox	The WB
Raleigh, North Carolina	August 1	WRAZ	50	The WB	Fox
Akron/Cleveland, Ohio	August 31	WVPX-TV	23	inTV	PAX TV
Arlington/Dallas/Fort Worth, Texas	August 31	KPXD-TV	68	inTV	PAX TV
Detroit, Michigan	Unknown date	WLPC-LP	26	America One (primary); FamilyNet (secondary)	FamilyNet (exclusive)
Norwell/Boston, Massachusetts	August 31	WBPX-TV	46	inTV	Pax TV
Champaign/Decatur/Urbana, Illinois	August 31	WPXU-TV	23	inTV	Pax TV
Chicago, Illinois	August 31	WCFC/WCPX-TV	38	Christian independent	Pax TV
Hagerstown, Maryland (Washington, D.C.)	August 31	WWPX-TV	60	inTV	Pax TV
Kenosha/Milwaukee, Wisconsin	August 31	WHKE/WPXE-TV	55	inTV	Pax TV
Los Angeles, California	August 31	KPXN-TV	30	inTV	Pax TV
Miami/Fort Lauderdale, Florida	August 31	WPXM-TV	35	inTV	Pax TV
New York, New York	August 31	WPXN-TV	31	inTV	Pax TV
Melbourne/Orlando, Florida	August 31	WOPX-TV	56	inTV	Pax TV
Philadelphia, Pennsylvania (Wilmington, Delaware)	August 31	WPPX-TV	61	inTV	Pax TV
Rome/Atlanta, Georgia	August 31	WTLK/WPXA-TV	14	inTV	Pax TV
San Francisco-Oakland-San Jose, California	August 31	KKPX-TV	65	inTV	Pax TV
Scranton/Wilkes-Barre, Pennsylvania	August 31	WQPX-TV	64	inTV (as WSWB-TV)	Pax TV
Seattle-Tacoma, Washington	August 31	KBGE/KWPX-TV	33	ValueVision	Pax TV
Albany, New York	October 5	WVBG-LP	25	Independent	UPN
Scranton/Wilkes-Barre, Pennsylvania	November 1	WSWB; WILF	38; 53	Fox	The WB

== Births ==
Date	Name	Notability
January 4	Coco Jones	Actress (So Random!, Good Luck Charlie, Bel-Air) and singer
January 9	Kerris Dorsey	Actress (Brothers & Sisters, Ray Donovan)
January 12	Nathan Gamble	Actor (Runaway, Hank)
January 22	Joe Serafini	Actor (High School Musical: The Musical: The Series)
January 23	Rachel Crow	Actress (Fred: The Show, Home: Adventures with Tip & Oh) and singer
January 28	Ariel Winter	Actress (Phineas and Ferb, Jake and the Never Land Pirates, Modern Family, Sofia the First)
February 9	Isabella Gomez	Actress
February 15	Zachary Gordon	Actor (Bubble Guppies, Diary of a Wimpy Kid)
February 20	Matt Hunter	Colombian-American singer and voice actor (Go, Diego, Go!)
March 5	Micah Fowler	Actor (Speechless)
March 22	Paola Andino	Actress (Every Witch Way)
April 6	Peyton List	Actress (Diary of a Wimpy Kid, Jessie, Bunk'd, Light as a Feather, Cobra Kai)
April 6	Spencer List	Actor
April 9	Elle Fanning	Actress and sister of Dakota Fanning
April 11	Oliver Dillon	English actor (Lumpy on My Friends Tigger & Pooh)
April 12	Larry Saperstein	Actor (High School Musical: The Musical: The Series)
April 24	Ryan Whitney	Actress (Zeke and Luther, See Dad Run, The Thundermans)
April 27	Froy Gutierrez	Actor (Teen Wolf)
June 11	Charlie Tahan	Actor (Wayward Pines)
June 16	Lauren Taylor	Actress (Best Friends Whenever) and singer
June 19	Atticus Shaffer	Actor (The Middle, Fish Hooks, Steven Universe, The Lion Guard)
June 24	Coy Stewart	Actor (Are We There Yet?, Bella and the Bulldogs)
July 7	Dylan Sprayberry	Actor (Teen Wolf)
July 8	Maya Hawke	Actress (Stranger Things, Asteroid City, Moon Girl And Devil Dinosaur), singer, model and daughter of Ethan Hawke and Uma Thurman
July 8	Jaden Smith	Actor (All of Us, The Get Down), rapper and son of Will Smith and Jada Pinkett Smith
July 9	Robert Capron	Actor (Diary of a Wimpy Kid)
July 10	Haley Pullos	Actress (General Hospital)
July 10	Angus Cloud	Actor (Euphoria) (d. 2023)
July 17	Kennedy Lea Slocum	Actress (WITS Academy)
July 22	Madison Pettis	Actress (Cory in the House, Phineas and Ferb, Life with Boys, Lab Rats, The Fosters, The Lion Guard)
July 24	Bindi Irwin	Australian actress (Dancing with the Stars season 21 [winner])
July 24	Logan Grove	Voice actor (Gumball on The Amazing World of Gumball (2011–14))
July 25	Kyson Facer	Actor (I Am Frankie)
July 31	Rico Rodriguez	Actor (Modern Family)
August 1	Khamani Griffin	Actor (All of Us, Carpoolers, Ni Hao, Kai-Lan)
August 3	Cozi Zuehlsdorff	Actress and singer
August 8	Shawn Mendes	Canadian singer
August 13	Devan Leos	Actor (Mighty Med)
August 25	China Anne McClain	Actress (Tyler Perry's House of Payne, Jonas, A.N.T. Farm, Descendants: Wicked World, Descendants, Black Lightning) and singer
September 4	Elizabeth Elias	Actress (Every Witch Way)
October 1	Danika Yarosh	Actress (See Dad Run, Shameless, Heroes Reborn)
October 6	Matt Cornett	Actor (High School Musical: The Musical: The Series)
October 28	Nolan Gould	Actor (Modern Family)
November 4	Darcy Rose Byrnes	Actress (The Young and the Restless, Desperate Housewives, The Legend of Korra, Sofia the First, Spirit Riding Free)
November 17	Kara Hayward	Actress
November 22	Eric Unger	Actor
November 23	Samantha Diaz	Singer (American Idol)
November 23	Bradley Steven Perry	Actor (Good Luck Charlie, Mighty Med, Descendants: Wicked World, Lab Rats: Elite Force)
November 24	Peyton Meyer	Actor (Girl Meets World)
December 2	Annalise Basso	Actress
December 2	Amber Frank	Actress (The Haunted Hathaways, Spirit Riding Free)
December 8	Tanner Buchanan	Actor (Designated Survivor, Cobra Kai)
December 16	Kiara Muhammad	Voice actress (Doc McStuffins, Sofia the First)
December 17	Jasmine Armfield	English actress (EastEnders)
December 22	G Hannelius	Actress (Surviving Suburbia, Sonny with a Chance, Good Luck Charlie, Dog with a Blog) and singer
December 23	Jackie Radinsky	Actor (Bella and the Bulldogs)
December 29	Paris Berelc	Actress (Mighty Med, Lab Rats: Elite Force, Alexa & Katie)
December 31	Hunter Schafer	Actress (Euphoria)

== Deaths ==
Date	Name	Age	Notability
January 4	Mae Questel	89	Actress (voice of Olive Oyl in Popeye the Sailor)
January 5	Sonny Bono	62	Singer and entertainer (The Sonny & Cher Comedy Hour)
January 21	Jack Lord	77	Actor (Steve McGarrett on Hawaii Five-O)
February 3	Fat Pat	27	American rapper
February 6	Carl Wilson	51	Singer-songwriter (The Beach Boys) and brother of Brian Wilson
February 19	Grandpa Jones	84	Comedian and musician (Hee Haw)
February 23	Philip Abbott	74	Actor (The F.B.I.)
March 10	Lloyd Bridges	85	Actor (Mike Nelson on Sea Hunt)
April 17	Linda McCartney	56	Musician (guest star on The Simpsons) (Paul McCartney's wife)
May 14	Frank Sinatra	82	Singer, actor, and producer
May 28	Phil Hartman	49	Actor, comedian (Saturday Night Live, The Simpsons, NewsRadio)
May 29	Barry Goldwater	89	Politician and Republican nominee for president in 1964
July 6	Roy Rogers	86	Singer and actor (The Roy Rogers Show)
July 21	Robert Young	91	Actor (Father Knows Best, Marcus Welby, M.D.)
July 30	Buffalo Bob Smith	80	Children's show host (Howdy Doody)
August 2	Shari Lewis	65	Puppeteer (Lamb Chop's Play-Along)
September 23	Mary Frann	55	Actress (Joanna on Newhart)
October 2	Gene Autry	91	Musical performer (The Gene Autry Show)
October 3	Roddy McDowall	70	Actor (Tales of the Gold Monkey)
November 17	Dick O'Neill	70	Actor (Family Matters, Home Improvement)
November 17	Esther Rolle	78	Actress (Florida on Maude and Good Times)
December 6	Michael Zaslow	56	Actor (Roger Thorpe on Guiding Light)
December 14	Norman Fell	74	Actor (Stanley Roper on Three's Company)
December 23	Michelle Thomas	30	Actress (Myra on Family Matters, Justine on The Cosby Show)
December 25	Richard Paul	58	Actor (Carter Country, Match Game)

== See also ==
- 1998 in the United States
- List of American films of 1998
