= WPXU =

WPXU may refer to:

- WPXU-TV, a television station (channel 16, virtual 35) licensed to serve Jacksonville, North Carolina, United States
- WPXU-LD, a low-power television station (channel 29, virtual 38) licensed to serve Amityville, New York, United States
- WBUI, a television station (channel 23) licensed to serve Decatur, Illinois, United States, which used the call sign WPXU from May 1998 to June 1999
