= Court TV =

Digital broadcast television network

- Type: Digital over-the-air television network
- Country: United States
- Broadcast area: Nationwide via OTA digital television
- Affiliates: List of affiliates
- Headquarters: Atlanta, Georgia

Programming
- Picture format: HDTV 1080i; (downconverted to 480i or 720p on some affiliates and transmitted in either 16:9 widescreen or 4:3 letterbox)

Ownership
- Owner: Law & Crime
- Parent: Court TV Media LLC
- Key people: John Alleva; Scott Tufts; (vice presidents and managing editors); Vinnie Politan; (primetime anchor)

History
- Founded: December 14, 1990; 35 years ago
- Launched: July 1, 1991; 35 years ago (cable network); May 8, 2019; 7 years ago (broadcast network)
- Founder: Steven Brill
- Closed: January 1, 2008; 18 years ago (cable network)
- Replaced by: TruTV (cable network, United States); Court TV Canada (Canadian feed)

Links
- Website: www.courttv.com

Availability

Streaming media
- Service(s): DirecTV Stream; Frndly TV; FuboTV; Google TV; Haystack News; LG Channels; Pluto TV; Samsung TV Plus; Sling Freestream; TCL TV+; The Roku Channel; Tubi; Video Watch Free+; Xumo Play; YouTube TV

Court TV is an American digital broadcast television network and former pay-television channel. It was originally launched in 1991 with a focus on crime-themed programs such as true crime documentary series, legal analysis talk shows, and live news coverage of prominent criminal cases. In 2008, the original cable channel became TruTV.

The channel relaunched on May 8, 2019, as a digital broadcast television network owned by Scripps Networks, a subsidiary of the E. W. Scripps Company. Court TV is also available via streaming and FAST such as YouTube TV and The Roku Channel; its audio feed is available on SiriusXM channel 793.

On February 9, 2026, Scripps announced that they would sell Court TV to Law&Crime for an undisclosed amount.

== History ==
=== As a cable television channel ===
Cable television channel Courtroom Television Network, known as Court TV, was launched on July 1, 1991, at 6:00 am Eastern Time by founder Steven Brill and was available to three million subscribers. Its original anchors were Jack Ford, Fred Graham, Cynthia McFadden, and Gregg Jarrett. The network was born out of two competing projects to launch cable channels with live courtroom proceedings, the American Trial Network from Time Warner and American Lawyer Media, and in Court from Cablevision and NBC. Both projects were present at the National Cable Television Association, in June 1990. Rather than trying to establish two competing networks, the projects were combined on December 14, 1990. Liberty Media would join the venture in 1991. The network's first logo consisted of a rectangle with the word "COURT", and the letters "TV" below, with a line underneath. The network's second logo ran from 1999 to 2005. The network's third and final logo ran from 2005 to 2008.

The channel originally consisted of live courtroom trials that were interspersed with anchors and reporters. It was led by law writer Steven Brill, who left the network in 1997. The network came into its own during the Menéndez brothers' first trial in 1993, and the O.J. Simpson murder trial in 1995. In 1998, NBC sold its share of the network to Time Warner. That same year, Court TV began running several original and acquired programs in prime time, such as Homicide: Life on the Street, and Forensic Files. In 1999, it acquired the rerun rights to Fox's Cops.

Recognizing the growth of its prime time programming, Court TV announced in 2005 that it would split its programming into two brands. Daytime trial coverage was branded as Court TV News while other dayparts were branded under the tagline Seriously Entertaining; this programming would feature new reality television series focusing on crime-oriented topics. In January 2006, the network launched a male-targeted programming block known as "RED", an abbreviation of "Real. Exciting. Dramatic."

Time Warner bought full control of Court TV in 2006 and began running it as part of the company's Turner Broadcasting System division. The buyout of Court TV marked Time Warner's first television network acquisition, rather than a sale, since the acquisition of Turner in 1996. On July 11, 2007, it was announced that Court TV would be relaunched as truTV on January 1, 2008. The new brand was intended to accompany a larger shift towards action-oriented reality series which did not necessarily involve crime or law enforcement.

Reruns of Court TV series then aired on HLN (primarily Forensic Files) and the over-the-air digital network True Crime Network (originally known as Justice Network). With changes to HLN's programming strategy and the growing popularity of the genre, the network began to produce and premiere more original true crime programs in 2017.

=== As a digital broadcast network ===
On December 10, 2018, Katz Broadcasting (owned by the E. W. Scripps Company) announced that it would relaunch Court TV as an over-the-air network following the acquisition of the intellectual property rights to the Court TV name and the pre-2008 Court TV original programming library from Turner Broadcasting System and Warner Bros. Television Studios. Scripps announced affiliation deals with Tribune Media and Univision Communications at that date, in addition to existing Scripps-owned stations. Further deals with Meredith Corporation, Nexstar Media Group (which was in the process of acquiring Tribune; the deal closed in September 2019), Tegna, and Quincy Media were announced on May 2, 2019. The channel is also available nationally on Pluto TV and Haystack News.

The relaunched Court TV features live court coverage with former Court TV anchor Vinnie Politan as lead anchor. The network began broadcasting on May 8, 2019. The first live courtroom coverage was the Covington, Georgia, trial of parents who, after reporting their newborn baby missing in 2017, were later charged with murder. It also featured coverage of the Harvey Weinstein sexual assault trial and the trial of Kyle Rittenhouse.

In May 2020, the network was picked up for carriage on YouTube TV.

Following Scripps acquisition of Ion Media in 2021, it began to add Court TV to its stations in place of the defunct Qubo network.

On February 9, 2026, Scripps announced that they would sell Court TV to Law & Crime for an undisclosed amount.

== Affiliates ==
List of Court TV affiliates
Media market	State/Dist./Terr.	Station	Channel
Birmingham	Alabama	WPXH-DT2	44.2
Dothan	Alabama	WDFX-DT4	34.4
Huntsville	Alabama	WHDF-DT4	15.2
Mobile	Alabama	WKRG-DT4	5.4
Montgomery	Alabama	WIYC-DT4	48.4
Anchorage	Alaska	KDMD-DT6	33.6
Fairbanks	Alaska	KATN-DT7	2.7
Phoenix	Arizona	KNXV-DT4	15.4
Phoenix	Arizona	KPPX-DT3	51.3
Tucson	Arizona	KWBA-DT4	58.4
Yuma	Arizona	KVYE-DT5	7.5
Little Rock	Arkansas	KTHV-DT2	11.2
Bakersfield	California	KERO-DT2	23.2
Bakersfield	California	KUVI-DT5	45.5
Fresno	California	KGPE-DT4	47.4
Fresno	California	KVBC-LP	13.1
Los Angeles	California	KPXN-DT2	30.2
Palm Springs	California	KPSE-LD4	50.4
Sacramento	California	KSPX-DT2	29.2
Salinas	California	KMMD-CD	39.1
San Diego	California	KSWB-DT3	69.3
San Francisco	California	KKPX-DT3	65.3
San Luis Obispo	California	KSBY-DT4	6.4
Colorado Springs–Pueblo	Colorado	KOAA-DT2	5.2
Denver	Colorado	KPXC-DT3	59.3
Grand Junction	Colorado	KLML	20.1
Hartford–New Haven	Connecticut	WHPX-DT3	26.3
Hartford–New Haven	Connecticut	WCCT-DT2	20.2
Washington	District of Columbia	WPXW-DT3	66.3
Fort Myers	Florida	WFTX-DT3	36.3
Fort Myers	Florida	WGPS-LD6	22.6
Jacksonville	Florida	WPXC-DT2	21.2
Miami–Fort Lauderdale	Florida	WSFL-DT2	39.2
Orlando	Florida	WOPX-DT3	56.3
Panama City	Florida	WPGX-DT4	28.4
Tampa	Florida	WSNN-LD4	39.4
Tampa	Florida	WXPX-DT2	66.2
West Palm Beach	Florida	WHDT-DT2	9.2
West Palm Beach	Florida	WPXP-DT2	67.2
Tallahassee	Florida	WTXL-DT3	27.5
Atlanta	Georgia	WPCH-DT2	17.2
Atlanta	Georgia	WPXA-DT2	14.2
Augusta	Georgia	WFXG-DT4	54.4
Columbus	Georgia	WLTZ-DT4	38.4
Macon	Georgia	WPGA-DT6	58.6
Savannah	Georgia	WSAV-DT3	3.3
Savannah	Georgia	WSCG-LD	14.1
Savannah	Georgia	WGCB-LD	35.1
Honolulu	Hawaii	KPXO-DT2	66.2
Boise	Idaho	KIVI-DT5	6.5
Boise	Idaho	KTRV-DT2	12.2
Idaho Falls–Pocatello	Idaho	KPIF-DT6	15.6
Twin Falls	Idaho	KSAW-LD5	6.5
Chicago	Illinois	WCPX-DT3	38.3
Harrisburg	Illinois	WSIL-DT4	3.4
Rockford	Illinois	WREX-DT4	13.4
Springfield	Illinois	WCQA-LD	16.1
Fort Wayne	Indiana	WISE-DT4	33.4
Indianapolis	Indiana	WIPX-DT2	63.2
South Bend	Indiana	WSJV-DT4	28.4
Cedar Rapids	Iowa	KWWL-DT4	7.4
Davenport	Iowa	WHBF-DT2	4.2
Des Moines	Iowa	WHO-DT4	13.4
Des Moines	Iowa	KFPX-DT2	39.2
Sioux City	Iowa	KTIV-DT4	4.4
Wichita	Kansas	KDCU-DT5	31.5
Lexington	Kentucky	WLEX-DT4	18.4
Lexington	Kentucky	WUPX-DT2	67.2
Louisville	Kentucky	WHAS-DT4	11.4
Paducah	Kentucky	KPOB-DT4	15.4
Baton Rouge	Louisiana	K29LR-D	47.1
Lafayette	Louisiana	KATC-DT4	3.4
Lake Charles	Louisiana	KSWL-LD3	17.3
Monroe	Louisiana	KMCT-DT3	39.3
New Orleans	Louisiana	WPXL-DT3	49.3
Portland	Maine	WIPL-DT2	35.2
Baltimore	Maryland	WMAR-DT6	2.6
Boston	Massachusetts	WDPX-TV	58.1
Boston	Massachusetts	WUTF-DT5	27.5
Springfield	Massachusetts	WGGB-DT3	40.3
Cadillac–Traverse City	Michigan	WMNN-LD6	26.5
Cadillac–Traverse City	Michigan	WPXD-DT2	31.2
Detroit	Michigan	WXYZ-DT4	7.4
Flint–Saginaw–Bay City	Michigan	WNEM-DT5	5.5
Grand Rapids	Michigan	WZPX-DT2	43.2
Lansing	Michigan	WSYM-DT5	47.5
Marquette	Michigan	WZMQ-DT5	19.6
Duluth	Minnesota	KDLH-DT4	3.4
Minneapolis–Saint Paul	Minnesota	KARE-DT2	11.2
Rochester	Minnesota	KXLT-DT6	47.6
Biloxi–Gulfport	Mississippi	WXVO-LD5	7.5
Cleveland	Mississippi	WHCQ-LD3	8.3
Jackson	Mississippi	WJTV-DT4	12.4
Jefferson City	Missouri	KGKM-LD3	36.3
Joplin	Missouri	KPJO-LD	49.1
Kansas City	Missouri	KPXE-DT2	50.2
Springfield	Missouri	KRFT-LD	8.1
Springfield	Missouri	KSPR-LD4	33.4
St. Louis	Missouri	KPLR-DT2	11.2
St. Louis	Missouri	WRBU-DT2	46.2
Billings	Montana	KHMT-DT2	4.2
Bozeman	Montana	KBZK-DT5	7.5
Butte	Montana	KXLF-DT5	4.5
Great Falls	Montana	KTGF-LD3	50.3
Helena	Montana	KTVH-DT4	12.4
Missoula	Montana	KPAX-DT5	8.5
Omaha	Nebraska	KMTV-DT2	3.2
Las Vegas	Nevada	KMCC-DT3	34.3
Reno	Nevada	KREN-DT5	27.5
Albuquerque	New Mexico	KLUZ-DT4	14.4
Albany	New York	WYPX-DT3	55.3
Buffalo	New York	WPXJ-DT2	51.2
Binghamton	New York	WBNG-DT4	12.4
New York City	New York	WPXN-DT3	31.3
Syracuse	New York	WSPX-DT2	56.2
Watertown	New York	WVNC-LD5	45.5
Charlotte	North Carolina	WCNC-DT3	36.3
Greenville	North Carolina	WEPX-DT2	38.2
Greensboro–High Point	North Carolina	WGHP-DT3	8.3
Greensboro–High Point	North Carolina	WGPX-DT3	16.3
Raleigh	North Carolina	WRPX-DT2	47.2
Jacksonville	North Carolina	WPXU-DT2	35.2
Wilmington	North Carolina	WSFX-DT2	26.2
Bismarck	North Dakota	KNDB-DT9	26.9
Fargo–Grand Forks	North Dakota	KRDK-DT8	4.8
Minot	North Dakota	KNDM-DT9	24.9
Cincinnati	Ohio	WCPO-DT2	9.2
Cleveland	Ohio	WVPX-DT2	23.2
Columbus	Ohio	WCMH-DT2	4.2
Toledo	Ohio	WUPW-DT4	36.4
Oklahoma City	Oklahoma	KOPX-DT3	62.3
Tulsa	Oklahoma	KTPX-DT3	44.3
Portland	Oregon	KPDX-DT4	32.3
Portland	Oregon	KPXG-DT3	22.3
Altoona–Johnstown	Pennsylvania	WKBS-DT2	47.2
Pittsburgh	Pennsylvania	WINP-DT3	16.3
Pittsburgh	Pennsylvania	WPCB-DT2	40.2
Philadelphia	Pennsylvania	WDPN-DT2	2.2
Scranton–Wilkes-Barre	Pennsylvania	WQPX-DT3	64.3
Providence	Rhode Island	WPXQ-DT4	69.4
Charleston	South Carolina	WHDC-LD	12.1
Columbia	South Carolina	WKTC-DT6	63.6
Columbia	South Carolina	WZRB-DT2	47.2
Greenville–Spartanburg	South Carolina	WGGS-DT7	16.7
Sioux Falls	South Dakota	KDLT-DT6	46.5
Chattanooga	Tennessee	WKSY-LD7	21.7
Chattanooga	Tennessee	WDEF-DT5	12.5
Greeneville–Bristol	Tennessee	WKPT-DT7	19.7
Jackson	Tennessee	WYJJ-LD	27.1
Knoxville	Tennessee	WKNX-DT3	7.3
Knoxville	Tennessee	WPXK-DT2	54.2
Memphis	Tennessee	WPXX-DT2	50.2
Nashville	Tennessee	WSMV-DT4	4.4
Nashville	Tennessee	WNPX-DT2	28.2
Amarillo	Texas	KAOU-LD3	15.3
Corpus Christi	Texas	KRIS-DT4	6.4
Dallas–Fort Worth	Texas	KSTR-DT3	49.3
El Paso	Texas	KINT-DT5	26.5
Houston	Texas	KEHO-LD	32.1
Houston	Texas	KPXB-DT2	49.2
Laredo	Texas	KLDO-DT5	27.5
Lubbock	Texas	KLBK-DT2	13.2
McAllen–Harlingen	Texas	KNVO-DT5	48.5
Odessa–Midland	Texas	KUPB-DT5	18.5
San Antonio	Texas	KWEX-DT5	41.5
San Antonio	Texas	KPXL-DT2	26.2
Tyler	Texas	KPKN-LD3	33.3
Waco	Texas	KXXV-DT4	25.4
Wichita Falls	Texas	KAUZ-DT5	6.5
Salt Lake City	Utah	KSTU-DT3	13.3
Salt Lake City	Utah	KUCW-DT4	30.4
Christiansted–St. Croix	U.S. Virgin Islands	WCVI-DT3	23.3
Norfolk	Virginia	WPXV-DT4	49.4
Norfolk	Virginia	WTKR-DT2	3.2
Richmond	Virginia	WTVR-DT4	6.4
Roanoke	Virginia	WPXR-DT2	38.2
Seattle–Tacoma	Washington	KWPX-DT2	33.2
Spokane	Washington	KGPX-DT3	34.3
Beckley–Oak Hill	West Virginia	WVVA-DT4	6.4
Charleston	West Virginia	WLPX-DT2	29.2
Charleston	West Virginia	WOCW-LD	21.1
Martinsburg	West Virginia	WWPX-DT3	60.3
Crandon	Wisconsin	WMOW-DT4	4.4
Eagle River	Wisconsin	WYOW-DT4	34.4
Eau Claire	Wisconsin	WQOW-DT4	18.4
Green Bay	Wisconsin	WGBA-DT4	26.4
La Crosse	Wisconsin	WXOW-DT4	19.4
Madison	Wisconsin	WKOW-DT4	27.4
Milwaukee	Wisconsin	WMKE-CD	21.1
Milwaukee	Wisconsin	WPXE-DT3	55.3
Milwaukee	Wisconsin	WTMJ-DT3	4.3
Wausau	Wisconsin	WAOW-DT4	9.4
Casper	Wyoming	KGWC-DT3	14.3

== Programming ==
Court TV currently shows gavel to gavel live news trial coverage under the branding Court TV Live. Julie Grant hosts Opening Statements from 8 am to 9 am ET, and is joined in later dayparts with Ted Rowlands, Ashley Willcott, Michael Ayala and Julia Jenaé. Vinnie Politan anchors Closing Arguments with Vinnie Politan from 8 pm to 10 pm, and the show is repeated overnight.

Court TV's original programming traditionally consisted of reality legal programming and legal drama, such as legal-based news shows, legal-based talk shows, live homicide trial coverage, court shows, police force shows, and other criminal justice programming. The channel also carried a week-daily news block, In Session (the successor to Court TV News), which provided live news coverage of trials, legal news and details of highly publicized crimes Monday through Fridays from 9 to 11 am. ET (except during national holidays, with reruns of the channel's reality programming airing in place of the block on such days). Its coverage included analysis from anchors and guests to help viewers understand legal proceedings. In Session also ran a blog, Sidebar, where the In Session team posted updated legal news and analysis.

On August 11, 2020, it was announced that a new original true-crime series titled Judgment with Ashleigh Banfield will premiere on September 13, 2020.

== Other media ==
=== UK and Ireland ===
Court TV UK and Ireland
- Country: United Kingdom
- Broadcast area: United Kingdom, Ireland
- Headquarters: London, England.

Programming
- Language: English
- Picture format: 16:9 SDTV

Ownership
- Owner: Katz Broadcasting, LLC (E. W. Scripps Company)

History
- Launched: September 8, 2020; 6 years ago.
- Replaced: Sony Crime Channel

Links
- Website: CourtTV.com

Availability

Streaming media
- Court TV: Watch online

On August 10, 2020, Court TV began testing on Astra 28.2°E on frequency 11568 V DVB-S QPSK 22 5/6, with the label "54140".

On September 1, 2020, Court TV was added to the EPG on Sky on channel 179 ahead of its official launch on September 8, 2020, as a replacement of Sony Crime Channel, according to on-screen information.

On February 15, 2021, Court TV joined the Freeview television service in the UK with a short-term deal to show the trial of Derek Chauvin. It was found on channel 89 and joined the Law & Crime Trial Network as part of the service's offerings (though this other network is currently found as part of the streaming options on channel 271, as it is broadcast via Channelbox). On June 1, 2021, Court TV shut down on Freeview, less than four months after starting, with its channel number de-activated on June 22.

Court TV can also be found on Freesat channel 163.

== Former spin-offs ==
=== Canadian version ===
Court TV Canada Logo

Court TV Canada, a Canadian version of the channel under its previous format, owned by CHUM Limited (and later acquired by CTVglobemedia which then sold its assets to Bell Canada under the Bell Media subsidiary), launched on September 7, 2001. Unlike its U.S. counterpart, it did not re-brand under the TruTV name and continued to operate as Court TV until August 30, 2010, when, as part of a wider licensing agreement with Discovery Communications and CTV, Court TV was rebranded to Investigation Discovery and then again in 2025 to Oxygen in partnership with NBCUniversal.

The U.S. version of Court TV had earlier been approved by the Canadian Radio-television and Telecommunications Commission as an eligible foreign channel in 1997, and indeed, had been carried by several Canadian service providers prior to the launch of the domestic service.

=== Websites ===
In 2001, Court TV purchased The Smoking Gun, a website that focuses on legal items such as mug shots and other public documents pertaining to famous individuals and cases. The site remained a property of the company through the rebranding to TruTV, but was sold back to its founder in 2014.

Court TV purchased the website Crime Library, which provided detailed information about infamous crimes and how they were solved, in 2001. The website remained an actively updated property until 2014 and was taken offline in 2015.

=== Satellite radio audio simulcast ===
On February 3, 2003, Court TV Plus debuted on Sirius Satellite Radio, featuring audio from Court TV programs. Launched on Channel 134, it was moved in September 2005 and aired on Channel 110 until the channel ceased operations on January 1, 2008. Scripps relaunched it over SiriusXM on May 15, 2020, but again wound it down on April 21, 2022, after expanding the channel's AVOD video availability as duplicative.

=== Court TV Mystery ===
On September 30, 2019, the Escape network was rebranded as Court TV Mystery, serving as an extension to the Court TV brand. The network was subsequently rebranded to Ion Mystery on February 24, 2022, with the "Ion" brand now more established regarding procedural dramas in general, including Ion Mystery's overall programming, whereas Court TV is more associated with its news division.
