= Grit (TV network) =

American free-to-air television network

- Type: Digital broadcast television network
- Country: United States
- Broadcast area: Nationwide coverage: 94%
- Headquarters: Atlanta, Georgia

Programming
- Picture format: 1080i 16:9 widescreen or 480i 4:3 letterbox

Ownership
- Owner: E. W. Scripps Company
- Parent: Scripps Networks, LLC
- Key people: Jonathan Katz (president CEO, Katz Broadcasting); Bill Cox (SVP of programming, Grit)

History
- Founded: April 3, 2014; 12 years ago
- Launched: August 18, 2014; 12 years ago
- Founder: Jonathan Katz

Links
- Website: www.grittv.com

Availability

Terrestrial
- List of Grit affiliates

Grit (stylized in all caps as GRIT) is an American free-to-air television network owned by the Scripps Networks subsidiary of the E. W. Scripps Company. The network features classic Westerns, both TV series and films.

The network is available in many media markets via the digital subchannels of free-to-air television stations and on the digital tiers of select cable providers through a local affiliate of the network.

Originally, Katz sold the network to affiliated TV stations via ad split, but by October 2015 had moved to paying carriage fees in exchange for distributing the network's ad inventory.^{1} Grit used direct response advertising as a meter of viewers before switching to Nielsen rating C-3.^{3} It is available on Dish Network, DirecTV Stream, Sling TV, U-verse TV, and Frndly TV.

== History ==
Grit was announced by Katz Broadcasting along with a sister network Escape on April 3, 2014, with a formal launch scheduled for that summer with initial affiliates announced at this time being Univision Communications owned stations. On August 11, 2014, Katz announced that the two networks would launch simultaneously on August 18, 2014. Grit launched at noon Eastern Time on that date, with the 1952 film High Noon as the network's inaugural broadcast, leading off a week-long festival of John Wayne films.

Katz estimated, based on direct response advertising business by September 2015, the network had over 250,000 prime time viewer and available in 91 million homes and 81% of the country. At that time, Grit along with its sister network, Escape, were signing up for national ratings from Nielsen. Previously handling the network's direct response advertising, Marathon Ventures would continue after the change over with advertising and sponsorship sales.

Following Scripps's acquisition of Ion Media on January 7, 2021, a previous agreement for the network to air on the subchannels of Univision Communications-owned-and-operated stations, was nullified. The network then moved to the stations of Ion Media and Inyo Broadcast Holdings (which acquired stations Scripps could not) as a subchannel, doing so by March 1, 2021 replacing the Ion Plus, Shop Ion and Qubo channels.

== Programming ==
Grit's program schedule features Westerns such as Death Valley Days, Laramie, The Life and Legend of Wyatt Earp, The Lone Ranger, The Texan and Tales of Wells Fargo, along with various Western films.

Katz Broadcasting president and CEO Jonathan Katz based the demographic-targeted concept of Escape and Grit after Bounce TV, a network Katz co-founded with Martin Luther King III and Andrew Young in 2011 that is targeted at African-American audiences. Katz stated Grit and Escape are "the country’s first ever male-centric and female-centric broadcast networks," featuring different programming from other classic television multicast networks that Katz referred to as "generic brands with generic names, created by studios to serve the studios."

=== Movies ===
Grit's program schedule features an extensive library of films through multi-year program licensing agreements with several major film studios: Warner Bros. Pictures, Universal Pictures, Paramount Pictures, Sony Pictures Entertainment, Shout! Factory, and Walt Disney Studios Motion Pictures (including 20th Century Fox titles).

=== Grit Xtra ===
Grit also operates Grit Xtra, an Internet FAST streaming service that carries older Western movies and TV series.

== Affiliates ==
As of June 2016, Grit has current or pending affiliation agreements with television stations covering approximately 78% of the United States. The network is also carried by Frndly TV, like its other Scripps Network counterparts.

When the network was first announced, Grit entered into an affiliation agreement with Univision Communications, which launched the network in 24 markets served by a station owned by the group or operated through local marketing agreements with Entravision Communications – giving Grit affiliates in 12 of the 20 largest U.S. television markets (including markets such as New York City, Los Angeles, Chicago, and Dallas-Fort Worth). The network immediately sought carriage on the digital subchannels of television stations owned by other broadcasting companies, on June 17, 2014, Katz signed group deals to carry Grit on stations owned and/or operated by Raycom Media in 26 markets (Raycom was merged into Gray Television at the start of 2019).

On July 17, 2014, Katz announced affiliation deals with the Cox Media Group to carry Grit on WFTV in Orlando and KMYT-TV in Tulsa, as well as Press Communications-owned KJWP in the Philadelphia market, and Citadel Communications-owned stations in Providence (WLNE-TV) and Lincoln (KLKN). It also expanded its affiliation deal with Univision Communications to add stations in Washington, D.C., San Francisco, and Phoenix to the network's originally announced Univision-owned charter affiliates.

On October 9, 2014, the Sinclair Broadcast Group announced that it would carry the network on stations it owns and/or operates in 47 markets. The deal lasted for three years, and Sinclair dropped the network on their stations from February 2017 until the start of 2018 in preference for their co-owned network with MGM (and Grit's most direct competitor), Charge!.

On November 16, 2015, Katz announced an affiliation deal with Media General adding the network to five more markets.

On June 15, 2016, Katz announced more affiliation deals with Nexstar Broadcasting Group and Cordillera Communications's KATC-TV.

Following Scripps's acquisition of Ion Media in January 2021, Scripps moved many of its subchannels, including Grit, to Ion-owned stations.

=== List of affiliates ===
Current affiliates for Grit
| Media market | State/District | Station | Channel |
|---|---|---|---|
| Birmingham | Alabama | WIAT-DT2 | 42.2 |
| Birmingham | Alabama | WPXH-DT3 | 44.3 |
| Dothan | Alabama | WDFX-DT3 | 34.3 |
| Huntsville | Alabama | WAFF-DT3 | 48.3 |
| Montgomery | Alabama | WSFA-DT3 | 12.3 |
| Mobile | Alabama | WFNA-DT4 | 55.4 |
| Anchorage | Alaska | KDMD-DT4 | 33.4 |
| Fairbanks | Alaska | KATN-DT6 | 2.6 |
| Phoenix | Arizona | KASW-DT3 | 61.3 |
| Phoenix | Arizona | KTVW-DT3 | 33.3 |
| Tucson | Arizona | KWBA-DT2 | 58.2 |
| Fayetteville | Arkansas | KNWA-TV | 51.3 |
| Jonesboro | Arkansas | KJBW-LD | 35.3 |
| Little Rock | Arkansas | KARK-TV | 4.3 |
| Fresno | California | KSEE | 24.3 |
| Los Angeles | California | KFTR-DT | 46.4 |
| Monterey–Salinas | California | KMMD-CD | 39.3 |
| Sacramento | California | KTXL | 40.3 |
| Sacramento | California | KTFK-DT | 64.4 |
| San Diego | California | KGTV | 10.3 |
| San Francisco | California | KFSF-DT | 66.4 |
| Santa Barbara | California | KPMR | 38.5 |
| Denver | Colorado | KPXC-TV | 59.6 |
| Denver | Colorado | KCDO-TV | 3.2 |
| Hartford–New Haven | Connecticut | WHPX-TV | 26.4 |
| Washington | District of Columbia | WFDC-DT | 14.3 |
| Fort Myers | Florida | WFTX | 36.4 |
| Gainesville | Florida | WCJB-TV | 20.6 |
| Jacksonville | Florida | WPXC-TV | 21.4 |
| Jacksonville | Florida | WRCZ-LD | 35.1 |
| Miami–Fort Lauderdale | Florida | WAMI-DT | 69.4 |
| Miami–Fort Lauderdale | Florida | WPXM-TV | 35.3 |
| Orlando | Florida | WRDQ | 27.2 |
| Panama City | Florida | WPGX | 28.3 |
| Tampa–St. Petersburg | Florida | WFTS-TV | 28.3 |
| Tampa–St. Petersburg | Florida | WXPX-TV | 66.3 |
| West Palm Beach | Florida | WPXP-TV | 67.4 |
| Atlanta | Georgia | WANF | 46.3 |
| Augusta | Georgia | WFXG | 54.3 |
| Columbus | Georgia | WTVM | 9.3 |
| Macon | Georgia | WPGA-TV | 58.5 |
| Savannah | Georgia | WTOC-TV | 11.3 |
| Honolulu | Hawaii | KHON-TV | 2.3 |
| Honolulu | Hawaii | KPXO-TV | 66.3 |
| Boise | Idaho | KTRV-TV | 12.3 |
| Idaho Falls–Pocatello | Idaho | KPIF | 15.3 |
| Champaign | Illinois | WCIA | 3.4 |
| Chicago | Illinois | WGN-TV | 9.3 |
| Joliet (Chicago) | Illinois | WGBO-DT | 66.3 |
| Rockford | Illinois | WTVO | 17.4 |
| Elkhart—South Bend | Indiana | WSJV | 28.2 |
| Evansville | Indiana | WFIE | 14.3 |
| Fort Wayne | Indiana | WISE-TV | 33.3 |
| Indianapolis | Indiana | WRTV | 6.2 |
| Terre Haute | Indiana | WAWV-TV | 38.2 |
| Cedar Rapids | Iowa | KPXR-TV | 48.2 |
| Des Moines | Iowa | WOI-DT | 5.3 |
| Ottumwa–Keokuk | Iowa | KYOU-TV | 15.3 |
| Topeka | Kansas | WIBW-TV | 13.6 |
| Wichita | Kansas | KDCU-DT | 31.2 |
| Bowling Green | Kentucky | WCZU-LD | 39.5 |
| Lexington | Kentucky | WLEX-TV | 18.2 |
| Lexington | Kentucky | WUPX-TV | 67.3 |
| Louisville | Kentucky | WAVE | 3.2 |
| Baton Rouge | Louisiana | WBXH-CD | 39.3 |
| Lafayette | Louisiana | KATC-TV | 3.3 |
| Lake Charles | Louisiana | KPLC | 7.4 |
| Monroe | Louisiana | KARD | 14.3 |
| New Orleans | Louisiana | WNOL-TV | 38.2 |
| Shreveport | Louisiana | KSLA | 12.2 |
| Bangor | Maine | WVII | 7.3 |
| Portland | Maine | WIPL | 35.4 |
| Baltimore | Maryland | WMAR | 2.2 |
| Salisbury | Maryland | WGDV-LD | 32.7 |
| Boston | Massachusetts | WDPX-TV | 58.1 |
| Cadillac–Traverse City | Michigan | WFUP | 45.5 |
| Cadillac–Traverse City | Michigan | WWTV | 9.5 |
| Cadillac–Traverse City | Michigan | WWUP | 10.5 |
| Detroit | Michigan | WPXD-TV | 31.3 |
| Grand Rapids | Michigan | WZPX-TV | 43.3 |
| Lansing | Michigan | WSYM-TV | 47.4 |
| Marquette | Michigan | WLUC-TV | 6.3 |
| Saginaw | Michigan | WAQP | 49.6 |
| Duluth | Minnesota | WDIO | 10.6 |
| Mankato–St. James | Minnesota | K16CG-D | 16.6 |
| Minneapolis–Saint Paul | Minnesota | KPXM-TV | 41.3 |
| Minneapolis–Saint Paul | Minnesota | KWJM-LD | 15.3 |
| Redwood Falls | Minnesota | K46FY-D | 46.1 |
| Rochester | Minnesota | KTTC | 10.4 |
| Jackson | Mississippi | WDBD | 40.3 |
| Biloxi–Gulfport | Mississippi | WXVO-LD | 7.2 |
| Biloxi–Gulfport | Mississippi | WXXV-TV | 25.5 |
| Laurel–Hattiesburg | Mississippi | WDAM-TV | 7.6 |
| Meridian | Mississippi | WMDN | 24.4 |
| Cape Girardeau | Missouri | KFVS-TV | 12.3 |
| Columbia–Jefferson City | Missouri | KQFX-LD | 22.3 |
| Joplin | Missouri | KODE-TV | 12.2 |
| Kansas City | Missouri | KSHB-TV | 41.2 |
| Springfield | Missouri | KOLR | 10.3 |
| St. Joseph | Missouri | KNPG-LD | 21.5 |
| St. Louis | Missouri | WRBU | 46.3 |
| St. Louis | Missouri | KTVI | 2.3 |
| Billings–Hardin | Montana | KHMT | 4.3 |
| Lincoln | Nebraska | KLKN | 8.2 |
| Omaha | Nebraska | KMTV-TV | 3.2 |
| Las Vegas | Nevada | KTNV | 13.3 |
| Reno | Nevada | KTVN | 2.5 |
| Reno | Nevada | KREN-TV | 27.2 |
| Albuquerque | New Mexico | KWBQ | 19.2 |
| Albany | New York | WYPX-TV | 55.4 |
| Buffalo | New York | WKBW-TV | 7.4 |
| Buffalo | New York | WPXJ-TV | 51.3 |
| Binghamton | New York | WBNG-TV | 12.5 |
| New York City | New York | WJLP | 33.2 |
| New York City | New York | WPIX | 11.3 |
| New York City | New York | WPXN-TV | 31.3 |
| Syracuse | New York | WSPX-TV | 56.3 |
| Utica | New York | WUTR | 20.3 |
| Charlotte | North Carolina | WJZY | 46.4 |
| Greensboro–Winston-Salem | North Carolina | WGPX-TV | 16.2 |
| Greensboro–Winston-Salem | North Carolina | WGHP | 8.3 |
| Greenville | North Carolina | WEPX-TV | 38.3 |
| Greenville | North Carolina | W35DW-D | 45.1 |
| Jacksonville | North Carolina | WPXU-TV | 35.3 |
| Raleigh | North Carolina | WNCN | 17.3 |
| Wilmington | North Carolina | WSFX-TV | 26.3 |
| Bismarck–Minot | North Dakota | KNDB | 26.3 |
| Bismarck–Minot | North Dakota | KNDM | 24.3 |
| Fargo–Grand Forks | North Dakota | KRDK-TV | 4.6 |
| Cleveland | Ohio | WEWS-TV | 5.2 |
| Cincinnati | Ohio | WXIX-DT4 | 19.4 |
| Columbus | Ohio | WCMH-DT2 | 4.2 |
| Toledo | Ohio | WTOL-DT3 | 11.3 |
| Oklahoma City | Oklahoma | KSBI-DT4 | 52.4 |
| Tulsa | Oklahoma | KJRH-DT5 | 2.5 |
| Bend | Oregon | KFXO-CD3 | 39.3 |
| Portland | Oregon | KRCW-DT3 | 32.3 |
| Portland | Oregon | KPDX-DT4 | 49.4 |
| Erie | Pennsylvania | WFXP-DT3 | 66.3 |
| Harrisburg | Pennsylvania | WHTM-DT3 | 27.3 |
| Johnstown–Altoona–State College | Pennsylvania | WTAJ-DT4 | 10.4 |
| Philadelphia | Pennsylvania | WPHL-DT3 | 17.3 |
| Pittsburgh | Pennsylvania | WPKD-DT3 | 19.3 |
| Scranton–Wilkes-Barre | Pennsylvania | WQPX-DT4 | 64.4 |
| Providence | Rhode Island | WLNE-TV | 6.2 |
| Charleston | South Carolina | WCSC-TV | 5.3 |
| Columbia | South Carolina | WZRB | 47.4 |
| Greenville | South Carolina | WHNS | 21.5 |
| Myrtle Beach | South Carolina | WMBF-TV | 32.5 |
| Chattanooga | Tennessee | WDEF-DT4 | 12.4 |
| Knoxville | Tennessee | WTNZ-DT3 | 43.3 |
| Memphis | Tennessee | WMC-DT3 | 5.3 |
| Memphis | Tennessee | WPXX-TV | 50.4 |
| Nashville | Tennessee | WNPX-TV | 28.3 |
| Abilene | Texas | KRBC-TV | 9.2 |
| Amarillo | Texas | KCIT | 14.2 |
| Austin | Texas | KNVA | 54.2 |
| Brownsville–Harlingen | Texas | KGBT-TV | 4.6 |
| Dallas–Fort Worth | Texas | KDAF | 33.3 |
| Dallas–Fort Worth | Texas | KPXD-TV | 68.3 |
| El Paso | Texas | KINT-TV | 26.2 |
| Houston | Texas | KFTH-DT | 67.3 |
| Houston | Texas | KPXB-TV | 49.3 |
| Jacksonville–Tyler–Longview | Texas | KETK-TV | 56.2 |
| Laredo | Texas | KXOF-CD | 31.4 |
| Lubbock | Texas | KCBD | 11.3 |
| Midland–Odessa | Texas | KMID | 2.4 |
| San Angelo | Texas | KLST | 8.3 |
| San Antonio | Texas | KYVV-TV | 28.1 |
| San Antonio | Texas | KWEX-DT | 41.3 |
| Wichita Falls | Texas | KJTL | 18.3 |
| Salt Lake City | Utah | KUCW-DT3 | 30.3 |
| Salt Lake City | Utah | KUPX-DT2 | 16.2 |
| Burlington | Vermont | WVNY-DT3 | 22.3 |
| Richmond | Virginia | WUPV-DT3 | 65.3 |
| Seattle–Tacoma | Washington | KCPQ-DT2 | 13.2 |
| Spokane | Washington | KREM-DT3 | 2.3 |
| Charleston–Huntington | West Virginia | WLPX-DT4 | 29.4 |
| Clarksburg | West Virginia | WVFX-DT5 | 10.5 |
| Green Bay | Wisconsin | WGBA-DT3 | 26.3 |
| Milwaukee | Wisconsin | WPXE-DT4 | 55.4 |
| La Crosse | Wisconsin | WLAX-DT4 | 25.4 |
| Madison | Wisconsin | WIFS-DT8 | 57.8 |
| Milwaukee | Wisconsin | WTMJ-DT4 | 4.4 |
| Wausau | Wisconsin | WTPX-DT2 | 46.2 |

== See also ==
- INSP (TV network)
- Outlaw (TV network)
- WEST (TV network)
