= WGDV-LD =

Television station in Salisbury, Maryland

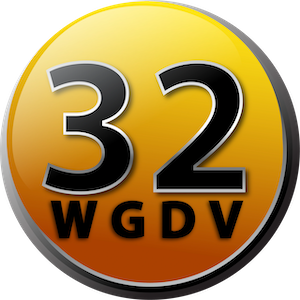
- Salisbury, Maryland; United States
- Channels: Digital: 28 (UHF); Virtual: 32
- Branding: WGDV Delmarva 32

Programming
- Affiliations: 32.1: WeatherNation TV; for others, see § Subchannels

Ownership
- Owner: Marquee Broadcasting, Inc.
- Sister stations: WMDT

History
- Founded: May 29, 2012
- First air date: October 1, 2016
- Former call signs: W32EK-D (2012–2016)
- Former channel numbers: Digital: 32 (UHF, 2016–2019)
- Former affiliations: Azteca América (2016–2022); MeTV (2022–2024)

Technical information
- Licensing authority: FCC
- Facility ID: 187979
- Class: LD
- ERP: 15 kW
- HAAT: 286.9 m (941 ft)
- Transmitter coordinates: 38°30′6.4″N 75°44′7.4″W

Links
- Public license information: LMS

WGDV-LD (channel 32) is a low-power television station in Salisbury, Maryland, United States, affiliated with WeatherNation TV. It is owned by the locally-based Marquee Broadcasting alongside ABC affiliate and company flagship WMDT (channel 47). The two stations share studios on West Main Street (mailing address is Downtown Plaza) in Salisbury; WGDV-LD's transmitter is located in rural Wicomico County northeast of Mardela Springs.

WGDV was affiliated with the Spanish-language Azteca América network until its closure on December 31, 2022. MeTV programing replaced Azteca América programming until WGDV became a WeatherNation TV affiliate in 2024.

== Subchannels ==
The station's signal is multiplexed:

Subchannels of WGDV-LD
Channel	Res.	Short name	Programming
32.1	720p	Weather	WeatherNation TV
32.2	480i	Bounce	Bounce TV
32.3	480i	HnI	Heroes & Icons
32.4	480i	MeToons	MeTV Toons
32.5	480i	Mystery	Ion Mystery
32.6	480i	Start	Start TV
32.7	480i	Grit	Grit
