= Sins of the City =

- Genre: Crime drama
- Country of origin: United States
- Original language: English
- No. of seasons: 1
- No. of episodes: 13 (4 unaired)

Production
- Running time: 60 minutes
- Production companies: Alliance Communications Corporation; Chesler/Perlmutter Productions; Screenventures I Productions

Original release
- Network: USA Network
- Release: July 19 – October 17, 1998

Sins of the City is an American crime drama television series that aired on USA Network from July 19 to October 17, 1998. While thirteen episodes of the series were produced, only nine episodes were aired before USA Network pulled the show.

== Premise ==
After losing his job on the police force, Vince Karol decides to become a private detective and dig into the seedier side of Miami.

== Cast ==
- Marcus Graham as Vince Karol
- José Zúñiga as Freddie Corillo
- Barbara Williams as Sam Richardson
- Daniel Tosh as DJ Dog Man

== Episodes ==
| No. | Title | Directed by | Written by | Original release date |
|---|---|---|---|---|
| 1 | "Pilot" | Damian Harris | Unknown | July 19, 1998 |
After a sting operation goes south and his affair with the wife of a co-worker is exposed, Vince quits the police force and becomes a private detective.
| 2 | "Breaking the Code" | Lee Bonner | Jennifer Salt | July 25, 1998 |
A vice cop is the target of an international prostitution ring.
| 3 | "Wolf Among the Flock" | Leon Ichaso | Jennifer Salt | August 1, 1998 |
Vince helps a priest deal with an extortionist.
| 4 | "Honor Among Thieves" | Tim Hunter | Unknown | August 8, 1998 |
Vince ends up befriending the cat burglar he was hired to catch.
| 5 | "Power of the Saints" | John Patterson | Unknown | August 15, 1998 |
Vince is hired to protect the young daughter of a wealthy contractor.
| 6 | "Blind Eye for Hire" | Lee Bonner | Jennifer Salt | August 22, 1998 |
Vince tracks down a missing model.
| 7 | "Quarry" | Vern Gillum | Unknown | August 29, 1998 |
A mysterious assailant goes after the trio.
| 8 | "What Love Taught Me" | Damian Harris | Unknown | October 10, 1998 |
Vince finds out that a woman's marital infidelity may be an attempt to save her husband's career.
| 9 | "Do You Want to Know a Secret" | Unknown | Jennifer Salt | October 17, 1998 |
Vince helps a socialite track down her missing daughter.
| 10 | "Bad X-Rays" | Leon Ichaso | N/A | Unaired |
A young girl plans to kill the people who killed her parents.
| 11 | "The Hurt Business" | N/A | N/A | Unaired |
A female boxer helps Vince bring down the prizefighter who attacked one of his friends.
| 12 | "Shark's Teeth" | N/A | N/A | Unaired |
Vince finds himself between a woman whose husband is missing and a ruthless land developer.
| 13 | "Rave On" | Leon Ichaso | N/A | Unaired |
Vince investigates the illegal underground world of teen parties when a young girl is raped, then turns up missing.
