= WGPX-TV =

Television station in Burlington, North Carolina

- Burlington–Greensboro–Winston-Salem–; High Point, North Carolina; United States
- City: Burlington, North Carolina
- Channels: Digital: 26 (UHF); Virtual: 16

Programming
- Affiliations: 16.1: Ion Television; for others, see § Subchannels

Ownership
- Owner: Inyo Broadcast Holdings (sale to the E. W. Scripps Company pending); (Inyo Broadcast Licenses LLC)

History
- Founded: September 7, 1982
- First air date: August 7, 1984
- Former call signs: WRDG (1984–1990); WAAP (1990–1998)
- Former channel numbers: Analog: 16 (UHF, 1984–2009); Digital: 14 (UHF, until 2019)
- Former affiliations: Independent (religious) (1984–1993); Independent (general entertainment) (1993–1996); inTV (1996–1998)
- Call sign meaning: Greensboro's Pax TV

Technical information
- Licensing authority: FCC
- Facility ID: 65074
- ERP: 125 kW
- HAAT: 502.4 m (1,648 ft)
- Transmitter coordinates: 35°52′13.5″N 79°50′24″W

Links
- Public license information: Public file; LMS
- Website: iontelevision.com

WGPX-TV (channel 16) is a television station licensed to Burlington, North Carolina, United States, serving the Piedmont Triad region as an affiliate of Ion Television. The station is owned by Inyo Broadcast Holdings, and maintains offices on North O'Henry Boulevard in Greensboro; its transmitter is located in Randleman, North Carolina.

== History ==
The station first signed on the air on August 7, 1984, as WRDG, originally operating as a religious independent station. It changed its call letters to WAAP in 1990, continuing to air religious programs while adding home shopping programming from Shop at Home. The station added cartoons during the early mornings and afternoons in the fall of 1992, and some low-budget barter entertainment shows during the evening hours that winter. In 1991, WAAP ran a local newscast, titled News Source 16. Austin Caviness, now a meteorologist at WXII-TV (channel 12), was among the on-air staffers; the newscast was canceled in 1992.

By 1993, WAAP had become a general entertainment station running mostly barter shows and professional wrestling from the United States Wrestling Association, Smoky Mountain Wrestling, and the World Wrestling Federation (now World Wrestling Entertainment). However, it never was able to gain much traction against the established non-Big Three stations in the market, Fox affiliate WNRW (channel 45, now ABC affiliate WXLV-TV) and its satellite WGGT (channel 48, now MyNetworkTV affiliate WMYV), and WBFX (channel 20, now CW affiliate WCWG). The Triad market was not large enough at the time to support what were essentially three independent stations, and channel 16 barely registered in the ratings. The station originally desired to affiliate with UPN and/or The WB when those networks launched in January 1995, but both of them affiliated with other area stations instead (The WB with WBFX; UPN on a secondary basis with WXLV/WGGT). By the fall of that year, WAAP did manage to acquire a few syndicated cartoons from WXLV and WGGT when those stations took the ABC affiliation from WGHP.

Paxson Communications bought the station in July 1996, and by the end of the year, WAAP became an affiliate of the Infomall Television Network (inTV), airing infomercials and religious programs for most of the day and overnight programming from The Worship Network. The station changed its call letters to WGPX-TV in January 1998, and became a charter owned-and-operated station of Pax TV (now Ion Television) when it launched on August 31 of that year.

The station broadcast its signal from a transmitter located in the Cane Creek Mountains near Snow Camp for many years. It later moved its transmitter to southern Rockingham County.

On February 27, 2021, WGPX-TV's second, third and fourth subchannels switched to Grit, Court TV and Laff when Ion Plus, Qubo and Ion Shop ceased broadcasting.

== Technical information ==
=== Subchannels ===
The station's signal is multiplexed:

Subchannels of WGPX-TV
Subchannel	Res.	Short name	Programming
16.1	720p	ION	Ion Television
16.2	480i	Bounce	Bounce TV
16.3	480i	CourtTV	Court TV
16.4	480i	Laff	Laff
16.5	480i	IONPlus	Ion Plus
16.6	480i	BUSTED	Busted
16.7	480i	GREAT	Great
16.8	480i	GameSho	Game Show Central
16.9	480i	HSN2	HSN2

=== Analog-to-digital conversion ===
WGPX-TV shut down its analog signal on June 12, 2009, as part of the FCC-mandated transition to digital television for full-power stations. The station's digital signal remained on its pre-transition UHF channel 14, using virtual channel 16.
