= KPPX-TV =

Television station in Tolleson, Arizona

- Tolleson–Phoenix, Arizona; United States
- City: Tolleson, Arizona
- Channels: Digital: 31 (UHF); Virtual: 51

Programming
- Affiliations: 51.1: Ion Television; for others, see § Subchannels

Ownership
- Owner: Inyo Broadcast Holdings (sale to the E. W. Scripps Company pending); (Inyo Broadcast Licenses LLC)

History
- Founded: December 21, 1988
- First air date: February 15, 1999
- Former channel numbers: Analog: 51 (UHF, 1988–2009); Digital: 52 (UHF, 2002–2009), 51 (UHF, 2009–2016)
- Call sign meaning: Phoenix's Pax TV (reflecting network's former branding)

Technical information
- Licensing authority: FCC
- Facility ID: 26655
- ERP: 1,000 kW
- HAAT: 536 m (1,759 ft)
- Transmitter coordinates: 33°20′3.2″N 112°3′40.5″W

Links
- Public license information: Public file; LMS
- Website: iontelevision.com

KPPX-TV (channel 51) is a television station licensed to Tolleson, Arizona, United States, serving the Phoenix area as an affiliate of Ion Television. The station is owned by Inyo Broadcast Holdings, and broadcasts from a transmitter located atop South Mountain on the city's south side.

== History ==
In February 1981, during an open window for low-power TV station applications, San Bernardino, California–based Community Service Television Company applied for a construction permit to build a translator station on channel 51, to serve Phoenix from atop South Mountain.

Two years later, on March 28, 1983, Saul Dresner filed a petition with the Federal Communications Commission (FCC) to allot UHF channel 51 to Tolleson, Arizona, for a full power television station. He presented sufficient evidence to support the allotment and expressed interest in applying for a station, and the FCC released a Notice of Proposed Rulemaking on June 9. On May 29, 1984, having received Mexican concurrence, the FCC allotted UHF channel 51 to Tolleson.

On November 23, Great Arizona Broadcasting Co., owned in part by Dresner, submitted an application to build a full power television station on the new allocation. More than twenty competing applications followed, and the FCC set up a hearing before an administrative law judge to determine which applicant would be the most qualified to build and operate the new station. Great Arizona Broadcasting subsequently withdrew its application, and on November 18, 1987, Judge Edward Luton released a decision granting the application of Aztec Broadcasting Corp., and denying the nine applications which remained.

Several of the denied applicants appealed the decision, and the FCC scheduled a hearing before a Review Board on May 6, 1988, to present exceptions to the initial decision. After hearing the arguments, the Review Board reversed the initial decision, and granted a permit to Hector Garcia Salvatierra instead. The FCC granted the construction permit on December 21, 1988. More appeals followed, and on September 5, 1990, the FCC released a Memorandum Opinion and Order upholding the decision of the Review Board. The decision was again appealed, this time to the U.S. Court of Appeals for the District of Columbia Circuit, and on October 7, 1991, the Court of Appeals upheld the decision of the FCC Review Board.

The new station was originally proposed for bilingual operations using stereo and separate audio program, but activity on the construction permit stopped. In March 1993, while the full power construction permit remained inactive, the FCC issued a construction permit for the low power translator station that had submitted an application twelve years earlier. The permit was valid until September 1994, and the new station received the call sign K51EI. K51EI was not constructed in the allotted time, and shortly before the permit expired, Community Service Television Company requested a six-month extension, which was granted in December 1994. However, in January 1995, Salvatierra secured a site license to build his station's facilities on South Mountain, then requested and received the call letters KAJW the following month. The K51EI permit was allowed to expire in June 1995, and in February 1996, the permit was canceled and call sign deleted.

On July 31, 1996, Salvatierra entered into an agreement with Paxson Communications (now Ion Media). Under terms of the agreement, Salvatierra created a new ownership entity called America 51, L.P., sold 49% interest of the new company to Paxson for $5.4 million, transferred the construction permit and site license to Paxson to build the television station, and gave them the right to purchase the remainder of the company for $6.6 million once the TV station had been on air for one year. Salvatierra filed the pro forma application the following week to assign the construction permit from Hector Garcia Salvatierra to America 51, L.P.

The station changed its call letters to KPPX in March 1998 to reflect its pending affiliation with Paxson's new Pax TV network (now Ion), and the station signed on the air February 15, 1999, broadcasting under Program Test Authority until its license was granted on April 20, 2000. Salvatierra sold the remaining interest in the company to Paxson Communications in November 2000.

=== Sale to Scripps and resale to Inyo ===
On September 24, 2020, the Cincinnati-based E. W. Scripps Company (owner of KNXV-TV and KASW) announced that it would purchase Ion Media for $2.65 billion, with financing from Berkshire Hathaway. With this purchase, Scripps divested 23 Ion-owned stations, including KPPX-TV, allowing the merged company to fully comply with the FCC local and national ownership regulations. Scripps sold those stations to Inyo Broadcast Holdings, continuing a long-term affiliation agreement with Ion Television and its networks. Inyo closed on the station on January 7, 2021.

Scripps announced its repurchase of all Inyo stations on February 26, 2026.

== Pornography controversy ==
On March 12, 2007, during a 9 p.m. airing of an Ion Life rebroadcast of a Tom Brokaw-hosted NBC special, State of U.S. Health Care, a station employee inserted about 30 seconds of a pornographic film into the broadcast, prompting telephone calls to local news media outlets and the local cable provider, Cox Communications. Parent company Ion Media Networks conducted a rigorous investigation into what they called "an intolerable act of human sabotage", and shortly thereafter, announced that the employee found to be responsible had been fired, threatening further legal action.

== Newscasts ==
From 2001 until 2005, when NBC entered into a shared services agreement with Pax TV, KPPX aired rebroadcasts of KPNX's 6 p.m. and 10 p.m. newscasts at 6:30 p.m. and 10:30 p.m.

== Technical information ==
=== Subchannels ===
The station's signal is multiplexed:

Subchannels of KPPX-TV
Subchannel	Res.	Short name	Programming
51.1	720p	ION	Ion Television
51.2	720p	Bounce	Bounce TV
51.3	480i	CourtTV	Court TV
51.4	480i	BUSTED	Busted
51.5	480i	IONPlus	Ion Plus
51.6	480i	Grit	Grit
51.7	480i	GameSho	Game Show Central
51.8	480i	QVC	QVC

=== Analog-to-digital conversion ===
In 1997, the FCC specified UHF channel 52 as the transition digital channel for KPPX-TV and granted a construction permit to build transition facilities on March 1, 2001. The station began digital operations pursuant to Program Test Authority on November 1, 2002, and the FCC granted the license to cover digital operations on December 20. Because its pre-transition digital channel was outside the range of core frequencies designated by the FCC (channels 2-51)—the high band UHF channels (52-69) being removed from broadcasting use as a result of the transition—KPPX-TV chose channel 51 for its permanent digital television operations, where it would move at the end of the digital transition, which, at the time, was scheduled for February 17, 2009. Although the DTV Delay Act became law on February 11, 2009, postponing the required analog shutoff until June 12, 2009, KPPX made the decision to proceed with final conversion on February 17, which was approved by the FCC.

KPPX-TV shut down its analog signal on February 17, 2009, the original target date for full-power television stations in the United States to transition from analog to digital broadcasts under federal mandate (which Congress had moved the previous month to June 12). The station's digital signal relocated from its pre-transition UHF channel 52, which was among the high band UHF channels (52-69) that were removed from broadcasting use as a result of the transition, to its analog-era UHF channel 51.

=== FCC spectrum repack ===
In January 2016, KPPX-TV submitted a petition to the FCC to change RF channel from 51 to 31 as part of an agreement to allow T-Mobile to begin service in the adjacent 700 MHz band. Finding that the petition warranted consideration, the FCC released a Notice of Proposed Rule Making (NPRM) in April, and approved the Tolleson allotment change in June. The following month, KPPX-TV submitted an application to change channels, which was immediately approved by the FCC. The station completed the move to channel 31 in October.

KPPX-TV was assigned channel 14 in the FCC Spectrum Repack, and was scheduled to change channels in Phase 10, to be completed by July 3, 2020. However, citing concerns of signal interference between channel 14 and the adjacent land mobile band at 460 MHz - 470 MHz, the station asserted that it was unable to construct facilities that would not cause prohibited interference. The FCC agreed, and allowed KPPX-TV to request alternate facilities during the first priority filing window. The station has requested to remain on channel 31.
