= KPXB-TV =

Television station in Conroe, Texas

- Conroe–Houston, Texas; United States
- City: Conroe, Texas
- Channels: Digital: 32 (UHF); Virtual: 49

Programming
- Affiliations: 49.1: Ion Television; for others, see § Subchannels

Ownership
- Owner: Ion Media; (Ion Media License Company, LLC)

History
- First air date: June 16, 1989
- Former call signs: KTFH (1989–1998)
- Former channel numbers: Analog: 49 (UHF, 1989–2009); Digital: 5 (VHF, 1998–2009)
- Former affiliations: Independent (June−November 1989); Galavisión (November 1989–1995); inTV (1995–1998)
- Call sign meaning: Paxson Broadcasting

Technical information
- Licensing authority: FCC
- Facility ID: 58835
- ERP: 1,000 kW
- HAAT: 579 m (1,900 ft)
- Transmitter coordinates: 29°34′15″N 95°30′37″W

Links
- Public license information: Public file; LMS
- Website: iontelevision.com

KPXB-TV (channel 49) is a television station licensed to Conroe, Texas, United States, serving as the Houston area outlet for the Ion Television network. It is owned by the Ion Media subsidiary of the E. W. Scripps Company, and maintains a transmitter near Missouri City, in unincorporated northeastern Fort Bend County.

== History ==
The station first signed on the air on June 16, 1989, as KTFH (not to be confused with present-day UniMás owned-and-operated station KFTH-DT, channel 67); mainly airing home shopping programming, before becoming an over-the-air affiliate of Spanish-language network Galavisión (which is primarily distributed through cable, satellite television, and IPTV) in November of that year.

KTFH was sold to Paxson Communications in 1995. Paxson then dropped Galavisión and affiliated it with its Infomall Television Network (inTV) infomercial service on April 3, 1995; its call letters were later changed to KPXB in early 1998. KPXB, along with other Paxson-owned stations, became a charter station of Pax TV (later i: Independent Television and now Ion Television) when the network launched on August 31, 1998.

From 1990 until 2009, KPXB was relayed on low-power translator KBPX-LP (channel 33), which mainly served to improve KPXB's signal coverage in southern portions of Houston since the full-power analog transmitter site was located in the far northern suburbs.

On September 24, 2020, the Cincinnati-based E. W. Scripps Company announced it would purchase KPXB-TV's owner, Ion Media, for $2.65 billion, with financing from Berkshire Hathaway. Part of the deal includes divesting 23 stations nationally to an undisclosed third party maintaining Ion affiliations.

== Newscasts ==
From 2000 to 2005, KPXB aired rebroadcasts of CBS affiliate KHOU (channel 11)'s newscasts at 6:30 and 11:30 p.m. instead of airing newscasts from NBC affiliate KPRC-TV (channel 2).

== Technical information ==
=== Subchannels ===
The station's signal is multiplexed:

Subchannels of KPXB-TV
| Subchannel | Res. | Short name | Programming |
|---|---|---|---|
| 49.1 | 720p | ION | Ion Television |
| 49.2 | 720p | Bounce | Bounce TV |
| 49.3 | 480i | Laff | Laff |
| 49.4 | 480i | IONPlus | Ion Plus |
| 49.5 | 480i | BUSTED | Busted |
| 49.6 | 480i | GameSho | Game Show Central |
| 49.7 | 480i | CourtTV | Court TV |
| 49.8 | 480i | Grit | Grit |

=== Analog-to-digital conversion ===
KPXB-TV ended regular programming on its analog signal, over UHF channel 49, on June 12, 2009, as part of the federally mandated transition from analog to digital television. The station's digital signal relocated from its pre-transition VHF channel 5 to UHF channel 32 due to signal issues common with low-band VHF digital channels, using virtual channel 49.

After the digital transition, KPXB moved its transmitter from east of Splendora to the Houston-area antenna farm near Missouri City. KBPX-LP was shut down on June 30, 2009, two weeks after the digital transition, due to loss of access to the tower site. However, since the main KPXB transmitter provides a signal comparable to the other Houston stations, the translator was redundant in any event. On November 22, 2010, KBPX-LP resumed operations on digital channel 46, as an affiliate of The Country Network.
