= WEPX-TV =

Television station in Greenville, North Carolina

WEPX-TV and WPXU-TV
WEPX-TV: Greenville, North Carolina; WPXU-TV: Jacksonville, North Carolina; United States
- Channels for WEPX-TV: Digital: 36 (UHF); Virtual: 38
- Channels for WPXU-TV: Digital: 16 (UHF); Virtual: 35

Programming
- Affiliations: 38.1/35.1: Ion Television; for others, see § Subchannels

Ownership
- Owner: Ion Media; (Ion Television License, LLC)

History
- Founded: WPXU-TV: September 20, 1994
- First air date: WEPX-TV: December 1998; WPXU-TV: July 26, 1999
- Former call signs: WPXU-TV: WFXZ-TV (July–December 1999)
- Former channel number: WEPX-TV: Analog: 38 (UHF, 1998–2009); Digital: 51 (UHF, 2008–2012), 26 (UHF, 2012–2019); WPXU-TV: Analog: 35 (UHF, 1999–2009); Digital: 34 (UHF, 2003–2020)
- Former affiliations: MyNetworkTV (secondary, 2006–2009)
- Call sign meaning: WEPX-TV: "Eastern Carolina's Pax"

Technical information
- Licensing authority: FCC
- Facility ID: WEPX-TV: 81508; WPXU-TV: 37971
- ERP: WEPX-TV: 850 kW; WPXU-TV: 425 kW
- HAAT: WEPX-TV: 275 m (902 ft); WPXU-TV: 218.4 m (717 ft)
- Transmitter coordinates: WEPX-TV: 35°12′2.6″N 77°11′12.8″W; WPXU-TV: 34°29′42″N 77°29′18″W

Links
- Public license information: WEPX-TV: Public file; LMS; WPXU-TV: Public file; LMS
- Website: iontelevision.com

WEPX-TV (channel 38) in Greenville, North Carolina, and WPXU-TV (channel 35) in Jacksonville, North Carolina, are television stations broadcasting the Ion Television network to Eastern North Carolina. The stations are owned by the Ion Media subsidiary of the E. W. Scripps Company. WEPX-TV's transmitter is located northwest of New Bern, while WPXU's tower is near Holly Ridge.

WPXU operates as a full-time satellite of WEPX-TV; its existence is only acknowledged in station identifications. Aside from the transmitter, WPXU does not maintain any physical presence locally in Jacksonville.

WEPX and WPXU were affiliates of MyNetworkTV from September 5, 2006, until September 27, 2009, when MyNetworkTV's affiliation switched over to WITN-TV; prior to this, the stations were solely affiliates of Ion (then known as i: Independent Television and originally known as Pax TV).

== Technical information ==
=== Subchannels ===
The stations' signals are multiplexed:

Subchannels of WEPX-TV and WPXU-TV
| Channel | | Res. | Short name | Programming |
| WEPX-TV | WPXU-TV | Res. | Short name | Programming |
|---|---|---|---|---|
| 38.1 | 35.1 | 720p | ION | Ion Television |
| 38.2 | 35.2 | 480i | CourtTV | Court TV |
| 38.3 | 35.3 | 480i | Grit | Grit |
| 38.4 | 35.4 | 480i | Laff | Laff |
| 38.5 | 35.5 | 480i | IONPlus | Ion Plus |
| 38.6 | 35.6 | 480i | Mystery | Busted |
| 38.7 | 35.7 | 480i | GameSho | Game Show Central |
| 38.8 | 35.8 | 480i | HSN | HSN |
| 38.9 | 35.9 | 480i | QVC | QVC |

=== Analog-to-digital conversion ===
Because it was granted an original construction permit after the FCC finalized the DTV allotment plan on April 21, 1997, WEPX-TV did not initially receive a companion channel for a digital television station. WEPX was later assigned channel 51, and the digital signal signed on February 5, 2008. WEPX has filed a letter with the FCC requesting to move from channel 51 to channel 26. This was part of a larger move for the FCC to get TV stations off channel 51 to prevent interference with cell phone devices.

== Out-of-market cable carriage ==
In recent years, WPXU has been carried on cable in Carolina Beach, which is within the Wilmington media market.
