= KGPX-TV =

Television station in Spokane, Washington

- Spokane, Washington; Coeur d'Alene, Idaho; United States
- City: Spokane, Washington
- Channels: Digital: 34 (UHF); Virtual: 34

Programming
- Affiliations: 34.1: Ion Television; for others, see § Subchannels

Ownership
- Owner: Inyo Broadcast Holdings; (Inyo Broadcast Licenses LLC)

History
- Founded: April 2, 1998
- First air date: August 1, 1999
- Former channel numbers: Analog: 34 (UHF, 1999–2009)
- Call sign meaning: Pax TV (predecessor network to Ion)

Technical information
- Licensing authority: FCC
- Facility ID: 81694
- ERP: 104 kW
- HAAT: 450 m (1,476 ft)
- Transmitter coordinates: 47°35′57.2″N 117°18′1.2″W

Links
- Public license information: Public file; LMS
- Website: iontelevision.com

KGPX-TV (channel 34) is a television station in Spokane, Washington, United States, affiliated with Ion Television and owned by Inyo Broadcast Holdings. The station's transmitter is located on Krell Hill southeast of the city.

== History ==
On April 2, 1998, the Federal Communications Commission (FCC) granted an original construction permit to Paxson Communications for a full-service television station serving Spokane. On May 15, 1998, the FCC issued the call letters KBEU. It was the fourth television station granted such a permit on channel 34 since 1984. The previous station, low-power K34DU, reportedly signed on in 1997 and is mistakenly thought to have been the same station as KGPX.

Two months after the original construction permit was granted, the station changed its call letters June 12, 1998, to KGPX to reflect the new Pax network (the predecessor to Ion), of which the station was to be a part. KGPX signed on the air August 1, 1999. KGPX's license was issued on June 30, 2000.

== Technical information ==
=== Subchannels ===
The station's signal is multiplexed:

Subchannels of KGPX-TV
| Subchannel | Res. | Short name | Programming |
|---|---|---|---|
| 34.1 | 720p | ION | Ion Television |
| 34.2 | 720p | Bounce | Bounce TV |
| 34.3 | 480i | CourtTV | Court TV |
| 34.4 | 480i | Mystery | Ion Mystery |
| 34.5 | 480i | IONPlus | Ion Plus |
| 34.6 | 480i | BUSTED | Busted |
| 34.7 | 480i | GameSho | Game Show Central |
| 34.8 | 480i | QVC2 | QVC2 |

=== Analog-to-digital conversion ===
KGPX-TV shut down its analog signal, over UHF channel 34, on June 12, 2009, and "flash-cut" its digital signal into operation UHF channel 34, because it was granted an original construction permit after the FCC finalized the DTV allotment plan on April 21, 1997.

KGPX twice attempted to secure a companion digital allocation on channel 43 through a complex Negotiated Channel Election Arrangement with 19 other stations in Washington, Idaho and Oregon, but was denied by the FCC due to interference issues.

== Other channel 34 stations in Spokane ==
KGPX was the fourth television station to be granted an original construction permit on channel 34 in Spokane, Washington.

- KSMW, owned by Matlock Communications, Inc., was granted an original construction permit on April 9, 1984, to expire in 18 months. Matlock Communications did not build the station in the time allotted and was denied an extension of the permit.
- KRSK, owned by Robin C. Brandt, was granted an original construction permit on September 14, 1987, to expire December 1, 1989. Brandt also filed for an extension of the permit, but it was returned, and the original permit was allowed to expire.
- K34DU, owned by Browne Mountain Television, was awarded an original construction permit on June 1, 1992, beating three competitors. They were unable to construct the station in the time allotted and were granted five extensions of the construction permit. They were reported to have actually gone on the air in 1997, but in June 1998, with KGPX having been granted a construction permit for a full-service station on channel 34, K34DU applied for and was granted displacement relief, to move to channel 42. The application was dismissed in October 1999 and the station was never licensed.
