= WSPX-TV =

Television station in Syracuse, New York

- Syracuse, New York; United States
- Channels: Digital: 36 (UHF); Virtual: 56

Programming
- Affiliations: 56.1: Ion Television; for others, see § Subchannels

Ownership
- Owner: Ion Media; (Ion Television License, LLC)

History
- First air date: November 24, 1998
- Former channel numbers: Analog: 56 (UHF, 1998–2009); Digital: 15 (UHF, until 2019)
- Call sign meaning: Syracuse's Pax

Technical information
- Licensing authority: FCC
- Facility ID: 64352
- ERP: 82 kW
- HAAT: 452.1 m (1,483 ft)
- Transmitter coordinates: 42°56′42″N 76°1′27″W

Links
- Public license information: Public file; LMS
- Website: iontelevision.com

WSPX-TV (channel 56) is a television station in Syracuse, New York, United States, airing programming from the Ion Television network. Owned by the Ion Media subsidiary of the E. W. Scripps Company, the station maintains studios on Basile Rowe in East Syracuse and a transmitter on Sevier Road in Pompey, New York.

== History ==
WSPX-TV has been operating since November 24, 1998. From 2001 to 2005, WSPX re-aired newscasts from NBC affiliate WSTM-TV (channel 3).

== Technical information ==
=== Subchannels ===
The station's signal is multiplexed:

Subchannels of WSPX-TV
Subchannel	Res.	Short name	Programming
56.1	720p	ION	Ion Television
56.2	480i	CourtTV	Court TV
56.3	480i	Grit	Grit
56.4	480i	Mystery	Ion Mystery
56.5	480i	IONPlus	Ion Plus
56.6	480i	BUSTED	Busted
56.7	480i	GameSho	Game Show Central
56.8	480i	HSN	HSN
56.9	480i	QVC	QVC

WSPX-TV started broadcasting in high definition in May 2009.

The channel 15 frequency was short-spaced to Belleville, Ontario's CBLFT-13 and was approved on the condition that the effective radiated power of the U.S. station not exceed 100 kilowatts.

According to WSPX-TV, an early reduction in analog power and start of digital operation needed to take place months in advance of the February 17, 2009, FCC digital transition deadline to ensure that channel 15's antenna could be installed on the top of the tower in place of the existing channel 56 antenna before the onset of winter. UHF 56 was then left operational from a secondary, side-mounted antenna at a 25% reduction in coverage area until analog shut-off.

=== Analog-to-digital conversion ===
WSPX-TV shut down its analog signal, over UHF channel 56, on June 12, 2009, the official date on which full-power television stations in the United States transitioned from analog to digital broadcasts under federal mandate. The station's digital signal remained on its pre-transition UHF channel 15, using virtual channel 56.
