= WQPX-TV =

Television station in Scranton, Pennsylvania

- Scranton–Wilkes-Barre, Pennsylvania; United States
- City: Scranton, Pennsylvania
- Channels: Digital: 33 (UHF); Virtual: 64

Programming
- Affiliations: 64.1: Ion Television; for others, see § Subchannels

Ownership
- Owner: Ion Media; (Ion Television License, LLC)

History
- First air date: May 18, 1998
- Former channel numbers: Analog: 64 (UHF, 1998–2009); Digital: 32 (UHF, 2003–2019)
- Former affiliations: inTV (1998); UPN (secondary, 1998–1999)
- Call sign meaning: Susquehanna Valley Pax

Technical information
- Licensing authority: FCC
- Facility ID: 64690
- ERP: 700 kW
- HAAT: 377 m (1,237 ft)
- Transmitter coordinates: 41°26′6″N 75°43′34″W

Links
- Public license information: Public file; LMS
- Website: iontelevision.com

WQPX-TV (channel 64) is a television station licensed to Scranton, Pennsylvania, United States, broadcasting the Ion Television network to Northeastern Pennsylvania. Owned by the Ion Media subsidiary of the E. W. Scripps Company, the station has offices on Lackawanna Avenue in downtown Scranton, and its transmitter is located on Bald Mountain, northwest of Scranton and I-476.

== History ==
WQPX began broadcasting May 18, 1998, with test broadcasts; the official sign on took place June 1. Before WQPX signed on, the station's call sign was WSWB-TV, first used on channel 38 in the early 1980s (before its own sign-on) and currently used on that same station today. WSWB initially planned to sign on in July 1997, but delayed its launch so that it could construct a 5,000,000-watt signal to increase its must carry reach. Initially, WQPX aired Paxson's InfoMall format of infomercials and religious programming; on August 31, 1998, the station became one of the launch stations for Pax TV (the forerunner to Ion).

On October 5, 1998, WQPX added a secondary affiliation with UPN as part of a group deal between Paxson Communications and UPN; the network's programming aired in late night, following Pax's prime time lineup. UPN programming had previously aired in weekend late night timeslots on CBS affiliate WYOU (channel 22). WQPX dropped UPN in 1999.

The New York Times Company, then-owner of ABC affiliate WNEP-TV, announced plans to take over WQPX's advertising sales through a joint sales agreement in October 2000; the agreement came after negotiations with NBC affiliate WBRE-TV (channel 28) fell through. The arrangement with WNEP ended on June 30, 2005, after Paxson Communications terminated all joint sales agreements involving its stations.

== Newscasts ==
From 2001 to 2005, WQPX aired rebroadcasts of newscasts from ABC affiliate WNEP-TV (channel 16) instead of airing newscasts from NBC affiliate WBRE-TV (channel 28).

== Technical information ==
=== Subchannels ===
The station's signal is multiplexed:

Subchannels of WQPX-TV
Subchannel	Res.	Short name	Programming
64.1	720p	ION	Ion Television
64.2	480i	Bounce	Bounce TV
64.3	480i	CourtTV	Court TV
64.4	480i	Grit	Grit
64.5	480i	IONPlus	Ion Plus
64.6	480i	BUSTED	Busted
64.7	480i	GameSho	Game Show Central
64.8	480i	HSN	HSN
64.9	480i	QVC	QVC

=== Analog-to-digital conversion ===
WQPX-TV shut down its analog signal, over UHF channel 64, on June 12, 2009, the official date on which full-power television stations in the United States transitioned from analog to digital broadcasts under federal mandate. The station's digital signal remained on its pre-transition UHF channel 32, using virtual channel 64.
