= KWPX-TV =

Television station in Bellevue, Washington

- Bellevue–Seattle–Tacoma, Washington; United States
- City: Bellevue, Washington
- Channels: Digital: 33 (UHF); Virtual: 33

Programming
- Affiliations: 33.1: Ion Television; for others, see § Subchannels

Ownership
- Owner: Ion Media; (Ion Media License Company, LLC)

History
- First air date: May 17, 1989
- Former call signs: KBGE (1989–1998)
- Former channel numbers: Analog: 33 (UHF, 1989–2009); Digital: 32 (UHF, until 2009)
- Former affiliations: Independent (1989–1991); ValueVision (1991–1998)
- Call sign meaning: Washington State Pax

Technical information
- Licensing authority: FCC
- Facility ID: 56852
- ERP: 400 kW
- HAAT: 716 m (2,349 ft)
- Transmitter coordinates: 47°30′16.3″N 121°58′10″W

Links
- Public license information: Public file; LMS
- Website: iontelevision.com

KWPX-TV (channel 33) is a television station licensed to Bellevue, Washington, United States, serving as the Ion Television outlet for the Seattle–Tacoma area. The station is owned by the Ion Media subsidiary of the E. W. Scripps Company. KWPX-TV's offices are located on 304th Avenue Southeast in Preston, and its transmitter is located on West Tiger Mountain near Issaquah.

== History ==
The station signed on the air as KBGE on May 17, 1989. Its original transmitter site was atop Columbia Center; the transmitter was later moved to West Tiger Mountain. The call letters became KWPX-TV on March 9, 1998, after the station was purchased by Paxson Communications, replacing ValueVision with its inTV network until the launch of Pax on August 31, 1998. The station was a part of the early-2000s initiative by NBC to rebroadcast local newscasts a half-hour later on a Pax station; while KING-TV already featured newscasts on sister station KONG, KING-TV also rebroadcast its weeknight 11 p.m. newscasts on KWPX at 11:30 p.m.; these rebroadcasts were dropped in 2003.

Until 2021, the station carried Telemundo Seattle on its seventh subchannel, before Scripps' purchase of Ion Media nullified the agreement, in order to carry their subchannel networks. Cox-owned KIRO-TV relaunched Telemundo Seattle in the market in the fall of 2022 over subchannel 7.4.

== Technical information ==
=== Subchannels ===
The station's signal is multiplexed:

Subchannels of KWPX-TV
Subchannel	Res.	Short name	Programming
33.1	720p	ION	Ion Television
33.2	720p	CourtTV	Court TV
33.3	480i	Bounce	Bounce TV
33.4	480i	Grit	Defy
33.5	480i	IONPlus	Ion Plus
33.6	480i	BUSTED	Busted
33.7	480i	GameSho	Game Show Central
33.8	480i	QVC	QVC

Subchannel broadcast with MPEG-4 video

=== Analog-to-digital conversion ===
KWPX-TV shut down its analog signal, over UHF channel 33, on February 17, 2009, to conclude the federally mandated transition from analog to digital television. The station's digital signal relocated from its pre-transition UHF channel 32 to channel 33.
