= WLPX-TV =

Television station in Charleston, West Virginia

- Charleston–Huntington–; Parkersburg, West Virginia; Marietta, Ohio; United States
- City: Charleston, West Virginia
- Channels: Digital: 18 (UHF); Virtual: 29

Programming
- Affiliations: 29.1: Ion Television; for others, see § Subchannels

Ownership
- Owner: Ion Media; (Ion Television License, LLC)

History
- Founded: October 27, 1988
- First air date: August 31, 1998
- Former call signs: WKRP-TV (August–October 1998)
- Former channel numbers: Analog: 29 (UHF, 1998–2009); Digital: 39 (UHF, 2001–2019)
- Call sign meaning: Charleston's Pax

Technical information
- Licensing authority: FCC
- Facility ID: 73189
- ERP: 765 kW
- HAAT: 327.2 m (1,073 ft)
- Transmitter coordinates: 38°30′21.1″N 82°12′32.3″W

Links
- Public license information: Public file; LMS
- Website: iontelevision.com

WLPX-TV (channel 29) is a television station licensed to Charleston, West Virginia, United States, broadcasting the Ion Television network to the Charleston–Huntington market. The station is owned by the Ion Media subsidiary of the E. W. Scripps Company, and has offices on Prestige Park Drive in Hurricane; its transmitter is located on Barker Ridge Road in Ona, West Virginia near Milton.

== History ==
After originating as a construction permit in 1987 and receiving several extensions, WLPX-TV applied for its license on September 11, 1998. In the construction phase and for its first month on air, the station's calls were WKRP (the same as the fictional radio station in Cincinnati); it adopted its current call sign on October 5 of the same year. It has been a member of Ion (previously known as Pax TV and i: Independent Television) since its inception.

== Technical information ==
=== Subchannels ===
The station's signal is multiplexed:

Subchannels of WLPX-TV
Subchannel	Res.	Short name	Programming
29.1	720p	ION	Ion Television
29.2	480i	CourtTV	Court TV
29.3	480i	Bounce	Bounce TV
29.4	480i	Laff	Laff
29.5	480i	IONPlus	Ion Plus
29.6	480i	BUSTED	Busted
29.7	480i	GameSho	Game Show Central
29.8	480i	HSN	HSN
29.9	480i	QVC	QVC

=== Analog-to-digital conversion ===
WLPX-TV ended regular programming on its analog signal, over UHF channel 29, on June 12, 2009, the official date on which full-power television stations in the United States transitioned from analog to digital broadcasts under federal mandate. The station's digital signal remained on its pre-transition UHF channel 39, using virtual channel 29.
