= Joan Carter Conway =

American politician

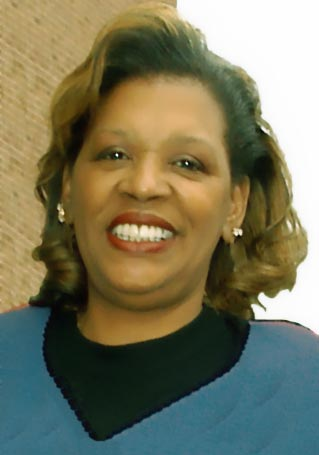
- Conway in 2007

Member of the Maryland Senate from the 43rd district
- In office 1997–2019
- Preceded by: John A. Pica Jr.
- Succeeded by: Mary L. Washington
- Constituency: Baltimore City

Baltimore City Council, District 3
- In office 1995–1997

Personal details
- Born: April 5, 1951 (age 75) Baltimore, Maryland, U.S.
- Party: Democratic
- Spouse: Vernon "Tim" Conway
- Occupation: Tax consultant

Joan Carter Conway (born April 5, 1951) is an American politician who represented district 43 in the Maryland State Senate. She is the first African American woman to be appointed chairman of any of the standing committees in the Maryland Senate.

== Background ==
Senator Conway was born to Floyd O. and Pauline N. Carter in Baltimore, Maryland, on April 5, 1951. She attended the Community College of Baltimore, earning her A.A. in human services in 1987 and then the University of Baltimore, with a B.A. in sociology in 1988. She is co-owner of CIG Professional Tax Services, Inc. Conway was appointed to the Senate, from the Baltimore City Council, when John A. Pica Jr. decided to retire in 1997. Since then she has won three elections without major opposition. In 2007, Conway headed a team of 3 incumbent delegates (Curt Anderson, Ann Marie Doory and Maggie McIntosh) and 7 state central committee members (Baltimore City Councilmen Ken Harris Sr. and Robert W. Curran, and Democrats Sherrod Barnes, Jeremy Rosendale, Beatrice Brown, and Sylvia Williams) to victory with every person on her ticket winning in the September primary. No other 11-person ticket achieved such distinction in the state primary election.

== In the Legislature ==
A member of Senate from January 8, 1997, to January 2019, Senator Conway was Chair of the Education, Health and Environmental Affairs Committee and a member of the Legislative Black Caucus of Maryland. Senator Conway was defeated in the 2018 democratic primary election by Mary L. Washington.

== Controversy in the news ==
=== Arrest ===
In 1999 Conway was arrested and charged with hindering a law enforcement officer after a six-year-old girl was struck by a vehicle in front of her office and she allegedly refused to provide space for the paramedics to work on the child. The charges were later dropped by State's Attorney Patricia Jessamy.

=== Liquor Board conflict ===
In a 2005 complaint filed with the Baltimore Circuit Court, Chief liquor inspector Samuel Daniels Jr. accused Conway of acting in collusion with other members of Baltimore's Liquor Board to replace him with her husband, Vernon Conway. At the time the complaint was filed Daniels had been suspended for reasons he claimed stemmed from his attempts to investigate bars on The Block which had quid pro quo relationships with other liquor inspectors and with Senator Conway. Daniels was later found by the city's labor commissioner to have been unfairly suspended and after being reinstated he eventually dropped the charges.

In 2010, while serving as the chair of the committee that hears alcohol bills, Conway went on the record saying that a bill that would allow wine to be shipped to residents of the state "is not going anywhere" despite the fact that 6 of the 9 members of her own committee and both chambers supporting the legislation. Conway cited the fact that it would be difficult for the state to ensure taxes were collected on wine shipped into the state and that it would give minors the ability to tap the internet to obtain alcohol. 37 of the 50 states currently allow wine to be shipped directly to residents.

But some proponents of the direct-shipping bill question whether she is too personally tied to the system to be fair. Her husband, Vernon "Tim" Conway, is a city liquor inspector since 1995 who made $67,000 in his position last year, according to city records.

According to a 2008 analysis by The Baltimore Sun, more than 80 percent of state legislators have received campaign contributions from the liquor lobby.

=== Academic boycott legislation ===
In the 2014 Maryland legislative session, Senator Conway introduced legislation to prevent the use of public college and university funds to support scholarly involvement in academic organizations that have voted to boycott Israel. Editorial boards for both the Washington Post and the Baltimore Sun came out against the bill. The legislation failed to get out of committee but on the House side was incorporated as an amendment to the State's budget bill.
