= Mary L. Washington =

American politician (born 1962)

Mary Washington
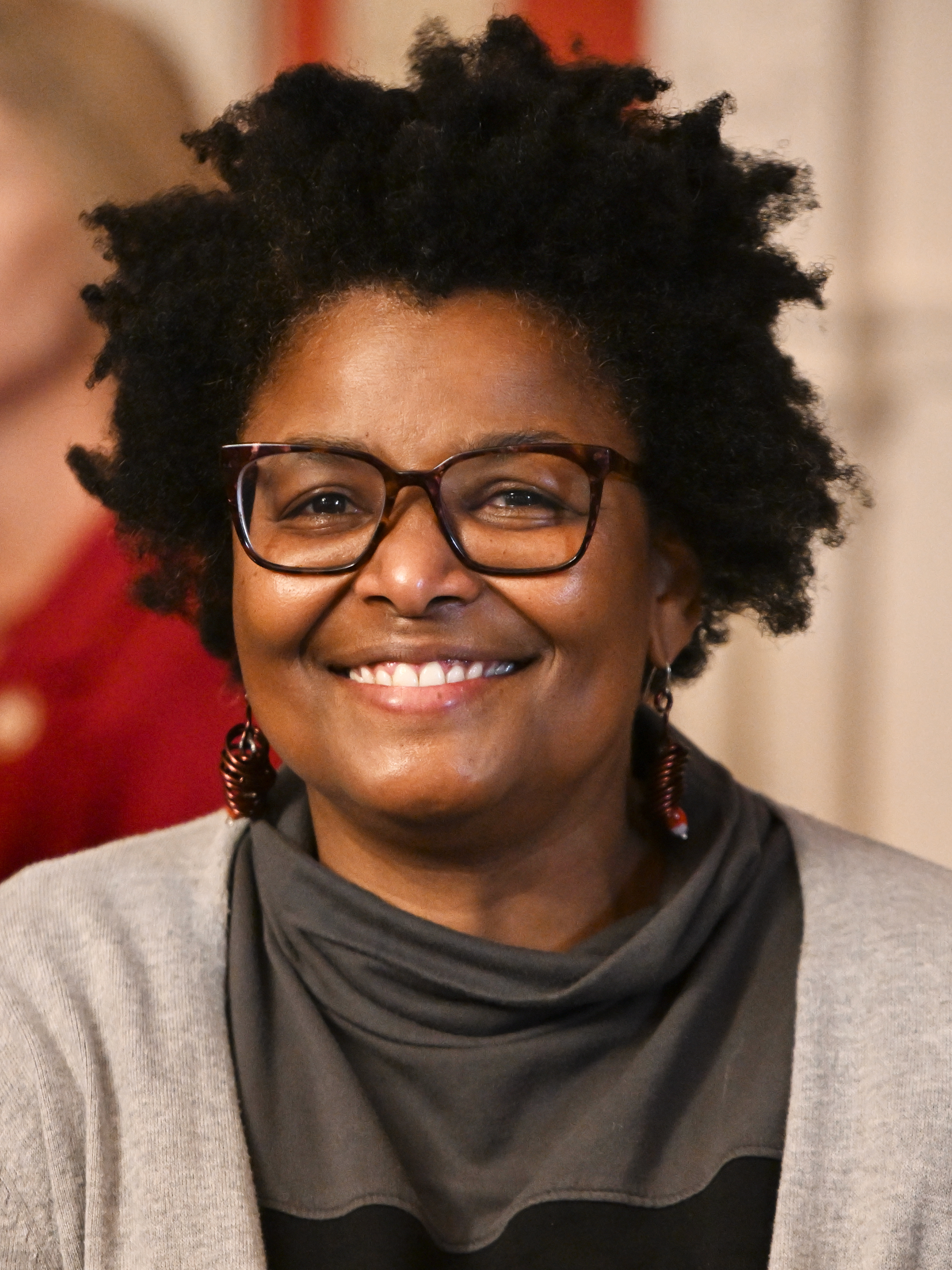
- Washington in 2023

Member of the Maryland Senate from the 43rd district
- Incumbent
- Assumed office January 9, 2019
- Preceded by: Joan Carter Conway

Member of the Maryland House of Delegates from the 43rd district
- In office January 12, 2011 – January 9, 2019
- Preceded by: Scherod C. Barnes
- Succeeded by: Regina T. Boyce

Personal details
- Born: May 20, 1962 (age 64) Philadelphia, Pennsylvania, U.S.
- Party: Democratic
- Spouse: Jodi Kelber-Kaye
- Education: Antioch University (BA); Johns Hopkins University (MA, PhD)
- Website: www.senatormarywashington.com

Mary Lynn Washington (born May 20, 1962) is an American politician who has served as a member of the Maryland Senate from District 43 since 2019. She previously represented the district in the Maryland House of Delegates from 2011 to 2019.

== Early life and education ==
Washington was born as the oldest of six children and raised in West Philadelphia, where she graduated from the Philadelphia High School for Girls. She later attended Antioch University, where she earned a Bachelor of Arts degree in human services in 1989. Washington moved to Baltimore in 1992 to attend Johns Hopkins University, where she earned Master of Arts and Doctor of Philosophy degrees in sociology and submitted a doctoral dissertation on the United States census' influence on national identity.

== Career ==
Washington worked as an assistant professor at Lehigh University from 1995 to 2002, afterwards working as a research fellow for the University of Pennsylvania. From 2002 to 2005, she became the director of the Baltimore Housing Authority's HousingStat office.

Washington first got involved in politics in 2006, when she unsuccessfully ran for the Maryland House of Delegates in District 43. She ran again in 2010, in which she won the Democratic primary, placing third with 25.1 percent of the vote, and ran unopposed in the general election.

=== Maryland House of Delegates ===
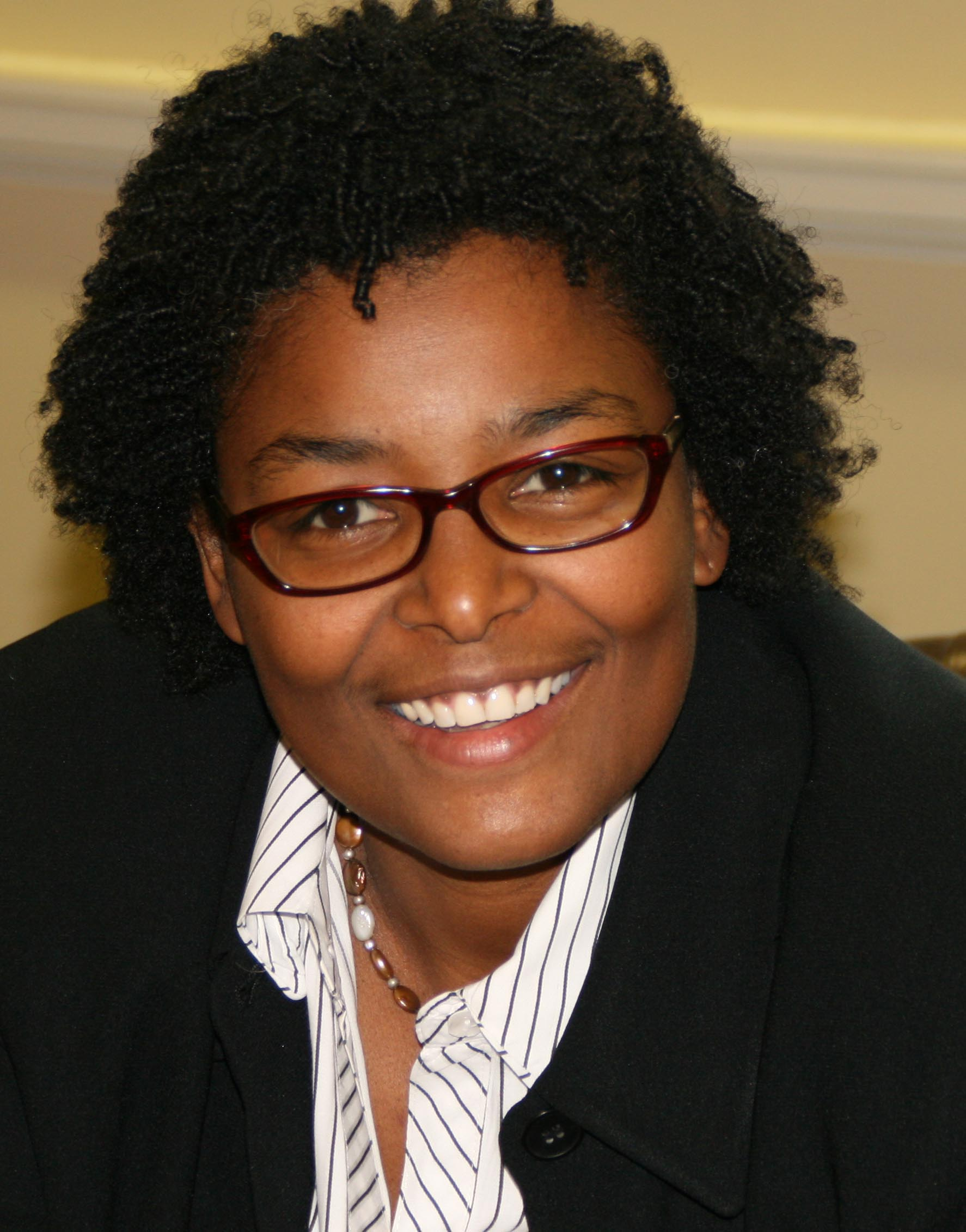
Washington in 2011

Washington was sworn into the Maryland House of Delegates on January 12, 2011, becoming the first openly lesbian African-American elected official in Maryland. She served as a member of the Appropriations Committee from 2011 to 2015, afterwards serving on the Ways and Means Committee until 2019.

On September 7, 2017, Washington announced her candidacy for the Maryland Senate in District 43 in 2018, challenging incumbent state senator Joan Carter Conway. She defeated Conway in the Democratic primary in an upset on June 26, 2018, by a margin of 492 votes, and ran unopposed in the general election.

=== Maryland Senate ===
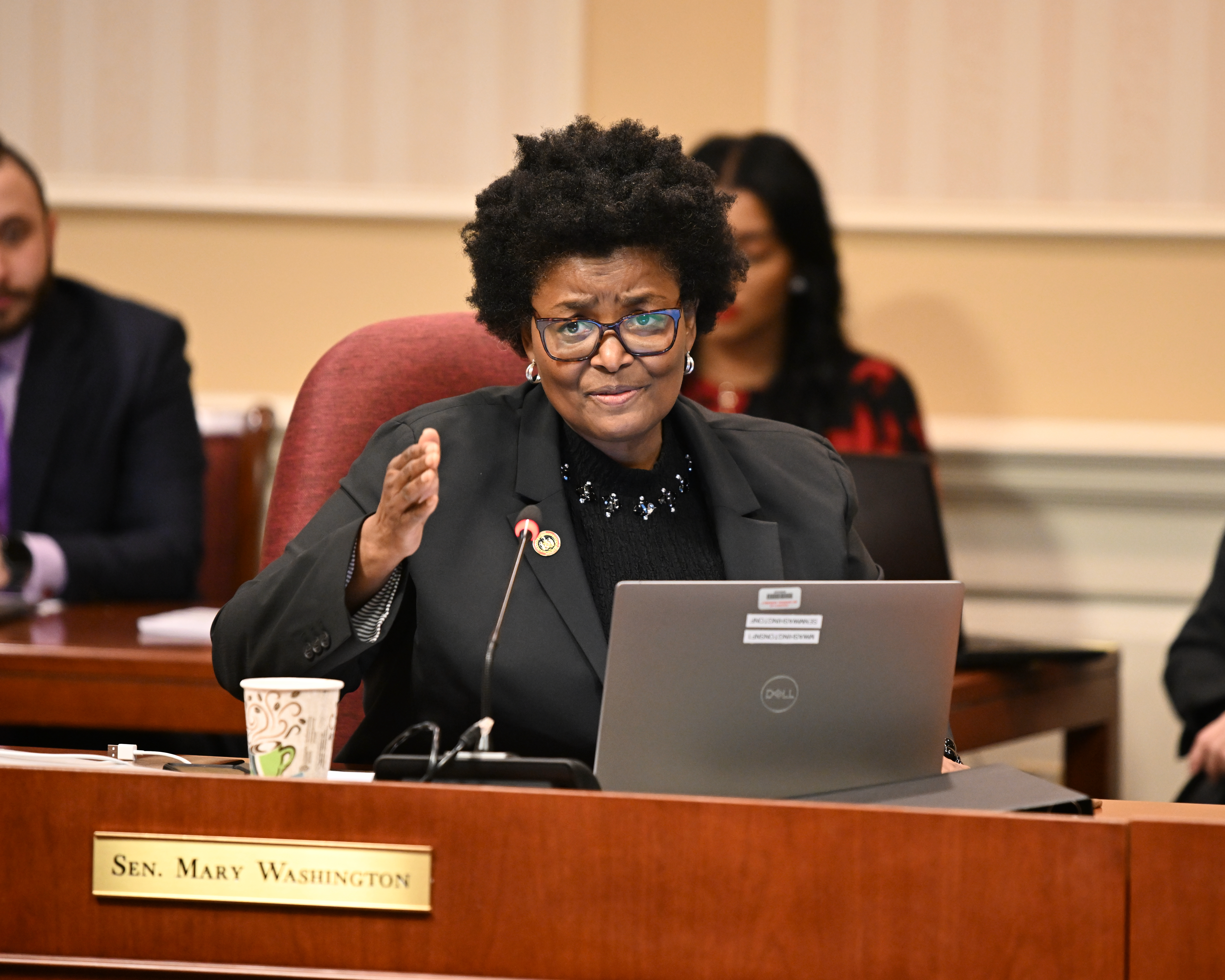
Washington in the Maryland Senate, 2023

Washington was sworn into the Maryland Senate on January 9, 2019, becoming the first openly gay African-American person and the first openly gay woman to serve in the Senate. She served as a member of the Judicial Proceedings Committee during the 2019 legislative session, afterwards serving on the Education, Energy, and the Environment Committee until 2027. She was assigned to the Senate Finance Committee at the start of the 2027 legislative session.

In October 2026, Senate president Bill Ferguson named Washington as the Senate's majority whip.

=== 2020 Baltimore mayoral campaign ===
On November 19, 2019, Washington announced her candidacy for mayor of Baltimore in 2020, challenging incumbent mayor Jack Young. She entered the race at a financial disadvantage, but quickly rose money during the election campaign, reporting $155,000 cash on hand by January 2020, the fourth most of any candidate. During the primary, Washington received endorsements from the Service Employees International Union Local 500, NARAL Pro-Choice Maryland, Baltimore Women United, and Our Revolution Baltimore.

On March 16, 2020, Washington suspended her campaign for mayor, citing the COVID-19 pandemic. She initially declined to endorse another candidate in the race, but later endorsed Democratic nominee Brandon Scott shortly before the general election. Had she won the Democratic primary and general election, she would have become the city's first openly LGBTQ person to serve as mayor of Baltimore.

In September 2020, Baltimore Comptroller-elect Bill Henry announced that Washington would co-chair his transition team.

== Political positions ==
Washington has been described as a progressive, including by herself.

=== Crime and policing ===
During the 2014 legislative session, Washington introduced legislation to make it illegal to shackle incarcerated women while they are in labor or recovering from giving birth. The unanimously passed the Maryland General Assembly and was signed into law by Governor Martin O'Malley. In March 2019, she was the lone senator to vote against a bill to allow for "enhanced penalties" when a person kills a pregnant woman.

During the 2019 legislative session, Washington said she "strongly and unconditionally opposed" legislation that would allow Johns Hopkins University to have its own private police force. She was one of two state senators to vote against the bill.

During the 2020 legislative session, Washington introduced bills to require Maryland to operate a standalone prerelease center for women that would provide "trauma informed prerelease services". During her mayoral campaign, she said she supported establishing local control of the Baltimore Police Department.

=== Education ===
During the 2016 legislative session, Washington supported legislation that would eliminate standardized testing in prekindergarten and kindergarten. She added that while she did not oppose standardized testing, she did not consider assessments to be the best way to improve instruction for students at these age groups.

In March 2018, Washington said she opposed a bill placing a referendum on the 2018 ballot to legalize sports betting at casinos and racetracks to fund education, calling the expansion of gambling a "tax on the poor".

In July 2019, Washington co-signed a letter to the Maryland State Department of Education calling for topics on the LGBT and Disability rights movements to be added to social studies curricula.

During her 2020 mayoral campaign, Washington said she supported the Blueprint for Maryland's Future and criticized the city's police spending, adding that she would fully fund the city's "community schools approach". In March 2020, she voted against amendments to the Blueprint bill that would create a "checkpoint" to test the success of the reforms by 2026, and proposed an amendment that would require school systems to increase salaries for non-teacher school employees by $3 an hour.

In December 2022, administrators of Maryland's 529 college savings plan discovered a calculation error affecting all 31,000 prepaid accounts, which led to the Maryland Prepaid College Trust suspending interest payments and preventing families from accessing their prepaid plans. Following this, Washington sent a letter to Maryland Attorney General Anthony Brown asking him to investigate the 529 agency.

=== Environment ===
In February 2018, Washington said she supported banning fracking in Maryland.

In March 2023, after it was announced that the Back River Wastewater Treatment Plant would treat 675,000 gallons of wastewater from the 2023 Ohio train derailment, Washington introduced legislation to block the plant from processing any wastewater.

=== Gun control ===
Washington supports gun control, saying that she believes reducing gun ownership limits violence in communities. In March 2015, she voted against legislation to allow school resource officers in Baltimore to carry guns inside of schools. In October 2016, Washington supported bills to restrict high-caliber guns, citing their use in violent crimes in Baltimore.

=== Housing and development ===
In May 2020, Washington said she supported a right to counsel in eviction cases.

In February 2023, Washington denounced Baltimore Mayor Brandon Scott's approval of the Baltimore Gas and Electric conduit deal, calling it a "disdain for Baltimore City voters" and an "abuse of power".

In June 2023, Washington said she opposed plans to install a crematorium at a funeral home in the Govans neighborhood of Baltimore, citing its environmental impacts to its surrounding community.

=== Marijuana ===
During the 2017 legislative session, Washington introduced legislation that would legalize and tax recreational marijuana.

=== National politics ===
Washington served as a convention delegate to the Democratic National Convention in 2012, pledged to President Barack Obama, and 2020, pledged to former Vice President Joe Biden. She supported Biden's selection of U.S. Senator Kamala Harris as his vice president. In November 2020, following the 2020 United States presidential election, Washington signed CASA de Maryland's Count Every Vote petition objecting against Republican efforts to invalidate 2.5 million mail-in ballots in Pennsylvania be counted.

In February 2026, Washington said she opposed pursuing mid-decade redistricting in Maryland, saying the issue was "incredibly reactive, and really that's not necessarily the best way to make sure that things are being done in the public interest". She also opposed holding a vote on a bill that would redraw Maryland's congressional districts to improve the Democratic Party's chances of winning the 1st congressional district, the only congressional district held by Republicans in the state.

=== Social issues ===
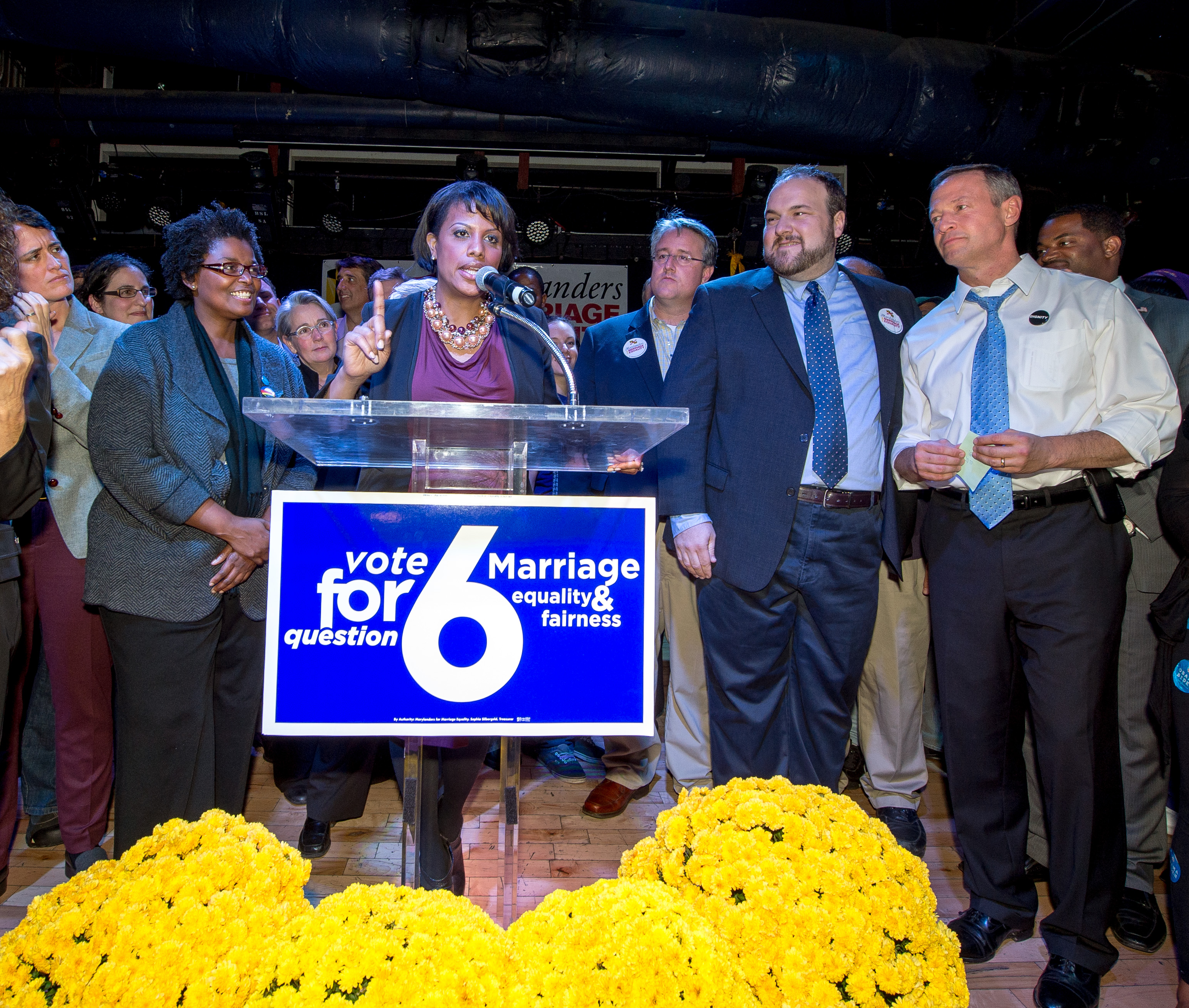
Washington (left) attends the Question 6 victory party, 2012

During the 2012 legislative session, Washington supported the Civil Marriage Protection Act, which legalized same-sex marriage in Maryland. She opposed Question 6, a 2012 referendum that sought to repeal the Civil Marriage Protection Act. During the 2019 legislative session, Washington introduced legislation that would allow the Maryland Department of Transportation to issue gender-neutral driver's licenses. In 2023, she introduced the Trans Health Equity Act, a bill that would require the state's Medicaid program to cover gender-affirming treatment, which passed and was signed into law by Governor Wes Moore.

During the 2013 legislative session, Washington introduced legislation to establish a task force to develop recommendations on how to address youth homelessness in Maryland, which passed and became law. She introduced legislation in 2014 to adopt the task force's recommendations and create the Maryland Homeless Youth Count Demonstration Project, which also passed and became law. During the 2021 legislative session, she introduced a bill that would make homeless youth eligible for tuition waivers, which passed and was signed into law by Governor Larry Hogan in May 2021.

In March 2018, Washington was one of three female members of the Maryland General Assembly to refuse to sign onto a letter pushing back against a report on sexual harassment in the legislature, calling it an attempt by legislative leaders to "control the narrative" on the topic of harassment in the State House. In June 2018, after The Baltimore Sun published a story revealing that state delegate Curt Anderson was under investigation for allegations of sexual assault, she sent a letter to leaders of the Maryland General Assembly questioning the pace of the investigation and calling for the release of an interim report. After Anderson was removed from leadership positions in August 2018, Washington said that his punishment was "too little and too late" and pushed for a resolution to allow Anderson to withdraw from the general election.

During her 2020 mayoral campaign, Washington said she would not support appointing a city manager, saying it should be the role of the mayor to run the city.

During the 2021 legislative session, Washington introduced a bill that would remove all flavored tobacco products from the market.

During the 2026 legislative session, Washington introduced a bill to codify current federal anti-discrimination policies into state law, including protections that allow families to adopt or become foster parents regardless of their sexual orientation or gender identity.

=== Taxes ===
During the 2016 legislative session, Washington introduced legislation to provide $2,500-a-year tax credits for first responders who buy homes in Baltimore.

In June 2017, Washington supported calls to place a moratorium on tax sales of homes with unpaid water bills, adding that the city should investigate all tax sales over the past three years into whether any properties were sold over questionable bills. During the 2019 legislative session, she introduced legislation that would ban Baltimore from placing liens against properties over unpaid water bills. The bill unanimously passed the Maryland General Assembly.

During her 2020 mayoral campaign, Washington said she supported investing into small and minority-owned businesses and cutting the city's property tax.

During the 2022 legislative session, Washington introduced legislation that would exempt diabetic care products from the state sales tax. The bill passed unanimously and was signed into law by Governor Larry Hogan on April 1, 2022.

== Personal life ==
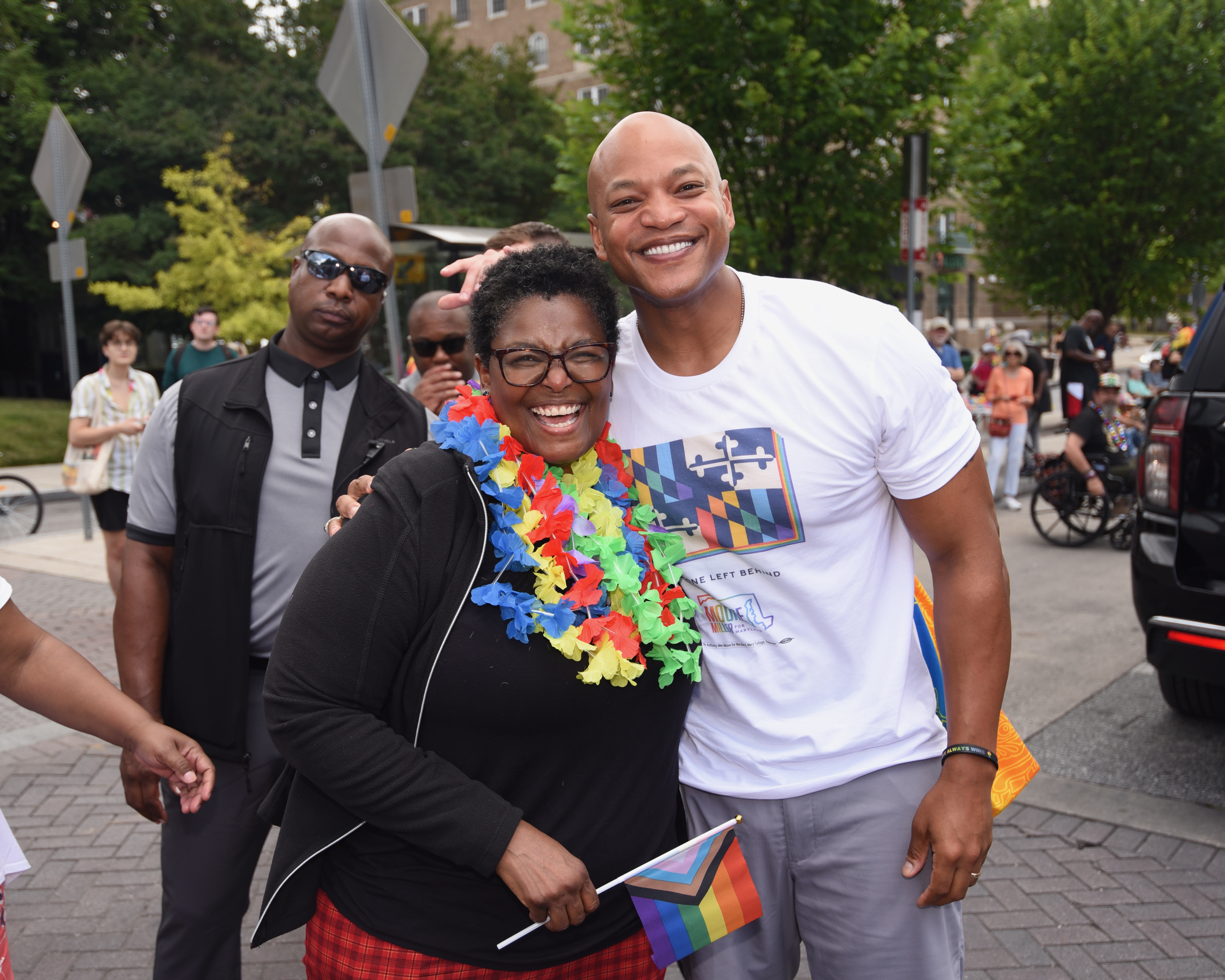
Washington with Governor Wes Moore at the Baltimore Pride Parade, 2023

Washington is openly lesbian, having come out to her family while she was in high school. She is married to her wife, Jodi Kelber-Kaye, whom she met during her unsuccessful campaign for state delegate in 2006 and began dating in February 2008. Together, they live in the Ednor Gardens-Lakeside neighborhood of Baltimore.

Washington was raised as a Catholic, but is now a Presbyterian and a member of the First and Franklin Presbyterian Church.

== Electoral history ==
Maryland House of Delegates District 43 Democratic primary election, 2006
Party	Candidate	Votes	%
Democratic	Curt Anderson (incumbent)	10,390	25.8
Democratic	Maggie McIntosh (incumbent)	9,540	23.7
Democratic	Ann Marie Doory (incumbent)	8,726	21.6
Democratic	Mary L. Washington	7,347	18.2
Democratic	Michael V. Dobson	3,074	7.6
Democratic	Mike Miller	1,230	3.1

Maryland House of Delegates District 43 Democratic primary election, 2010
Party	Candidate	Votes	%
Democratic	Maggie McIntosh (incumbent)	9,780	28.2
Democratic	Curt Anderson (incumbent)	9,739	28.1
Democratic	Mary L. Washington	8,705	25.1
Democratic	Kelly Fox	3,740	10.8
Democratic	Rodney C. Burris	1,880	5.4
Democratic	Leon Winthly Hector, Sr.	809	2.3

Maryland House of Delegates District 43 election, 2010
Party	Candidate	Votes	%
Democratic	Curt Anderson (incumbent)	24,831	35.1
Democratic	Maggie McIntosh (incumbent)	23,266	32.9
Democratic	Mary L. Washington	22,334	31.6
Write-in		312	0.4

Maryland House of Delegates District 43 election, 2014
Party	Candidate	Votes	%
Democratic	Curt Anderson (incumbent)	23,046	34.1
Democratic	Maggie McIntosh (incumbent)	22,310	33.0
Democratic	Mary Washington (incumbent)	21,800	32.3
Write-in		395	0.6

Maryland Senate District 43 Democratic primary election, 2018
Party	Candidate	Votes	%
Democratic	Mary Washington	9,694	51.3
Democratic	Joan Carter Conway (incumbent)	9,202	48.7

Maryland Senate District 43 election, 2018
Party	Candidate	Votes	%
Democratic	Mary Washington	35,972	98.8
Write-in		423	1.2

Baltimore mayoral Democratic primary election, 2020
Party	Candidate	Votes	%
Democratic	Brandon Scott	43,927	29.6
Democratic	Sheila Dixon	40,782	27.5
Democratic	Mary J. Miller	23,193	15.6
Democratic	Thiru Vignarajah	17,080	11.5
Democratic	Jack Young (incumbent)	9,256	6.2
Democratic	T. J. Smith	8,593	5.8
Democratic	Carlmichael Stokey Cannady	2,473	1.7
Democratic	Mary Washington (withdrawn)	1,028	0.7
Democratic	Valerie L. Cunningham	339	0.2
Democratic	Keith B. Scott	303	0.2
Democratic	Yasaun Young	188	0.1
Democratic	Ralph E. Johnson, Jr.	177	0.1
Democratic	Yolanda Pulley	152	0.1
Democratic	Lou Catelli	151	0.1
Democratic	Dante C. Swinton	143	0.1
Democratic	Michael Douglas Jenson	131	0.1
Democratic	Brian J. Salsberry	129	0.1
Democratic	Rikki Vaughn (withdrawn)	116	0.1
Democratic	Liri Fusha	57	0.0
Democratic	Terry Jay McCready	46	0.0
Democratic	Sean Bernard Gresh	45	0.0
Democratic	James Hugh Jones, II	33	0.0
Democratic	Erik Powery	32	0.0
Democratic	Frederick Ware-Newsome	31	0.0

Maryland Senate District 43 election, 2022
Party	Candidate	Votes	%
Democratic	Mary Washington (incumbent)	32,333	90.3
Libertarian	Bob Gemmill	3,339	9.3
Write-in		129	0.4
