= Lisa Gladden =

American politician (born 1964)

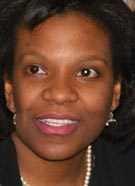

Member of the Maryland Senate from the 41st district
- In office 2003–2017
- Preceded by: Clarence W. Blount
- Succeeded by: Nathaniel T. Oaks

Member of the Maryland House of Delegates from the 41st district
- In office 1997–2003
- Preceded by: Wendell Phillips
- Succeeded by: Jill P. Carter

Personal details
- Born: Lisa Adrienne Gladden; October 6, 1964 (age 61) Baltimore, Maryland, U.S.
- Party: Democratic
- Occupation: Attorney

Lisa Adrienne Gladden (born October 6, 1964) is an American politician from Maryland and a member of the Democratic Party. She formerly served in the Maryland State Senate, representing Maryland's District 41 in Baltimore City. She resigned as Senator due Multiple Sclerosis on January 10, 2017

== Background ==
Born in Baltimore, Maryland, Gladden attended Duke University and the University of Maryland School of Law before entering practice as an attorney in the Office of the Public Defender. She was active with the American Bar Association, the Alliance of Black Women Attorneys, and with the Democratic Party. Gladden, a Democrat, told The Baltimore Sun in 2010 that she had multiple sclerosis. She told the newspaper she was first diagnosed in 1995 but did not disclose it because she didn't want sympathy or to become a "poster child" for MS.

== In the legislature ==
Gladden was first elected to and served as a member of House of Delegates from January 13, 1999 to January 8, 2003. During that time she was a member of the Judiciary Committee and chaired its criminal justice subcommittee from 1999 to 2003. She was also a member of the Liaison Work Group in the Baltimore City Delegation from 1999 to 2003. Gladden was elected to the Maryland State Senate in 2002, defeating longtime state Senator Barbara A. Hoffman, and was re-elected in 2006. She had been heavily mentored and rose quickly through the ranks, achieving the position of Majority Whip. Gladden was also vice-chair of the Judicial Proceedings Committee, a member of the Maryland State Commission on Criminal Sentencing Policy and a member of the Legislative Black Caucus of Maryland.

- Legislative notes
  - voted against electric deregulation in 1999 (HB703)
  - voted for slots in 2004 (SB197)
- 2006
  - voted for the Healthy Air Act in 2006 (SB154)
- 2007
  - voted in favor of prohibiting ground rents in 2007(SB106)
  - voted in favor of the Tax Reform Act of 2007 (HB2)
  - voted in favor of slots (SB3)
- 2009
  - sponsored a bill establishing that a material, compound, mixture, or preparation that contains Salvinorin A or Salvia divinorum, with a specified exception, is a Schedule I controlled dangerous substance.

== Task force, boards and commissions ==
2012- Gladden was appointed by Maryland legislative leaders to a task force to study the impact of a Maryland Court of Appeals ruling regarding the liability of owners of pit bulls and landlords that rent to them.

== Democratic party activist ==
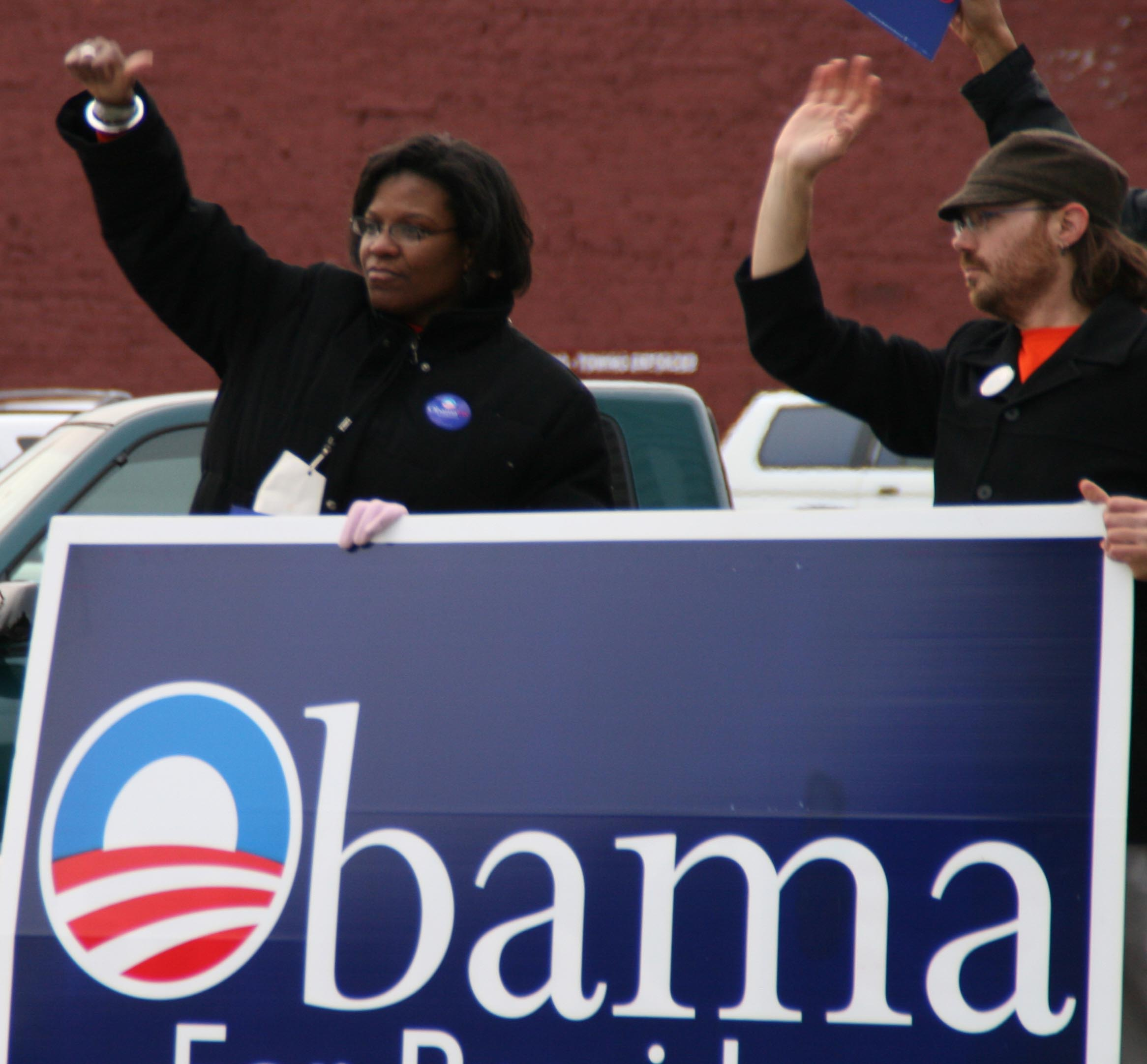
Gladden campaigning in Columbia, S.C. a day before the democratic primary there.

In December 2007, Gladden was chosen by the Obama for President campaign to appear on the ballot, in the Maryland democratic presidential primary, as a female delegate for Obama from Maryland's 7th congressional district. Gladden campaigned in Ohio, South Carolina, Pennsylvania and Maryland for Obama during the primary campaign. She finished first among the female delegates in the Maryland Democratic election and went to the 2008 Democratic National Convention, in Denver Colorado, as a delegate committed to Barack Obama. Along with Maryland Delegate Curt Anderson, Gladden served as co-chair of the Baltimore for Obama campaign in both the 2008 primary and general elections.
