= Sally Thorner =

American television news journalist

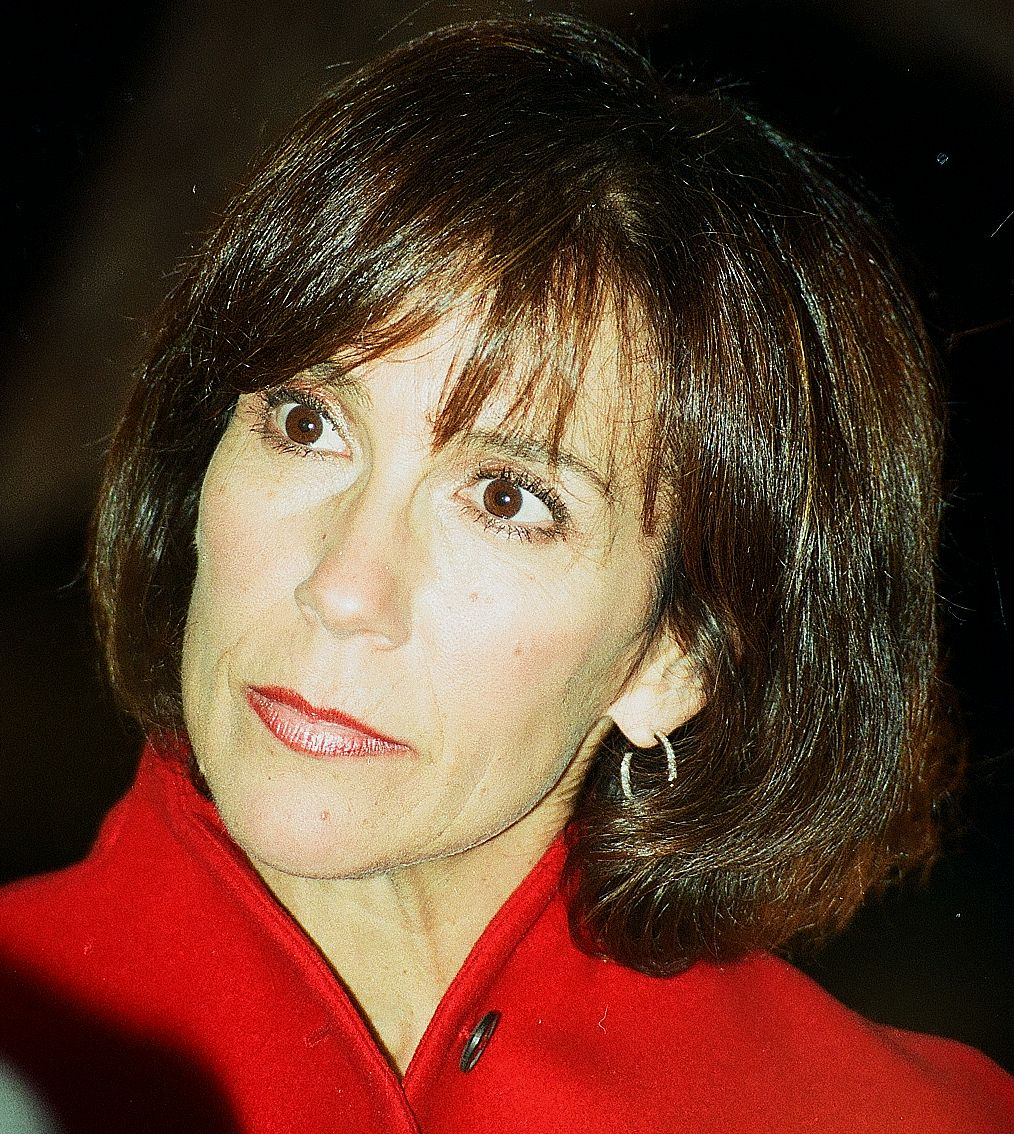
Thorner in 2000

Sally Thorner is a retired television news journalist who was a reporter and an anchor for several different markets over the course of 30 years. Although she worked in both Springfield, Massachusetts, and Wichita, Kansas, Thorner is primarily known as an anchor in Baltimore, Maryland, where she was on WMAR for ten years before joining WJZ-TV in 1993. After retiring from WJZ in 2009, Thorner began a career as a regular guest blogger for the Huffington Post, and as a voice-over artist.

== Career ==
Thorner's lengthy career in Baltimore earned her regular praise from such publications as The Baltimore Sun and the Jewish Times. For example, in an article on her life after retiring from television, Baltimore Sun Magazine editor Jill Rosen wrote that "As an anchorwoman for 25 years, [she was] the omnipresent face of television news in Baltimore."

In 1992 WJZ approached Thorner to lead their new 5 p.m. broadcast. At the time, she had been working nights at WMAR, so she took the job for both a pay raise and better hours (as she had become a new mother the year before). Thorner was not, however, able to immediately begin work at WJZ because of a non-compete clause in her previous contract. So, in December 1992, WJZ agreed to pay Thorner a full salary throughout all of 1993 although she would not log one hour on-air.

This move proved front-page fodder for the local newspapers as the advance payment represented WJZ management's confidence in Thorner's ability to win ratings. In fact, in a noted departure from Baltimore's traditional schema of co-anchors, Thorner was clearly delineated as the marquee player.

On the eve of her return to broadcast news in January 1994, the Sun wrote: "Tomorrow is opening night for one of the most important productions in the history of Baltimore television -- WJZ's new 5 o'clock news with Sally Thorner. For the record, WJZ calls it "Eyewitness News at Five" and has an impressive-looking press kit that stresses its "four-member news team -- Sally Thorner as news anchor joined by John Buren, Bob Turk and Sandra Pinckney." But Thorner's the franchise. She's the free agent for whom WJZ general manager Marcellus Alexander took out the checkbook and paid $250,000 in November 1992."

After Thorner announced her retirement, the Sun's David Zurawik wrote that, "She came to represent local broadcast news at its best - serious, trustworthy and nonsensational, but also reassuring and friendly... But it is her calm and solid presence at the anchor desk that will be missed and remembered most by Baltimore viewers. Thorner also embodied some of the challenges facing women of her generation, and was open in discussing the choices she made professionally in relation to goals for her family life."

In addition to her role as anchor, Thorner also played a minor role in the 1984 Goldie Hawn vehicle Protocol.

In her role as Huffington Post blogger, Thorner has discussed both her travels and more serious issues such as her battle with melanoma. Thorner has also utilized her role on the Huffington Post to promote Leadership Enterprise for a Diverse America (LEDA).

== Personal life ==
Thorner was born in Great Neck, New York, on June 20, 1955. She earned a BA from Smith College. In 1990, Thorner married physician Brian Rosenfeld. Their son, Everett Rosenfeld, is the Asia Pacific editor for CNBC.
