= Scherod C. Barnes =

American politician

Member of the Maryland House of Delegates from the 43rd district
- In office July 28, 2010 – January 12, 2011
- Preceded by: Ann Marie Doory
- Succeeded by: Mary L. Washington

Personal details
- Born: August 8, 1948 (age 77) Baltimore, Maryland
- Party: Democratic
- Spouse: Tarrie
- Children: 2
- Occupation: sales

Scherod C. Barnes is an American politician and community activist who represented the 43rd legislative district in Baltimore, Maryland as a member of the Maryland House of Delegates. Barnes was appointed to the legislature on July 18, 2010 to fill the vacancy created when Ann Marie Doory retired.

== Background ==
Barnes was born in Baltimore, Maryland, August 8, 1948. He attended Baltimore City public schools and graduated from Forest Park High School (Maryland) in 1967. Barnes also attended Morgan State University and is the Salesman and Community Coordinator for P. Flanigan & Sons, Inc., in Baltimore. He is the Chair, Baltimore City Democratic Central Committee and a charter member of 100 Black Men of Maryland. Barnes is the former president of the Northeast Community Organization and Former chair of the Northeast Citizens United. He is a member of the Baltimore Urban League, the National Association for the Advancement of Colored People, Phi Beta Sigma fraternity and the Prince Hall Masons, A.F. & A.M.

== Legislature ==
Delegate Barnes, a member of the 43rd District Democratic state central committee, was recommended to Governor Martin O'Malley by his district's state central committee to fill the vacancy created when Delegate Ann Marie Doory retired from the legislature. The Governor accepted the recommendation and appointed Barnes to the House in July 2010. Barnes declined to run for the seat to which he was appointed, opting instead to run for the Baltimore City Council in 2011.
