= WWPX-TV =

Television station in Martinsburg, West Virginia

Satellite of WPXW-TV, Manassas, Virginia–Washington, D.C.
- Martinsburg, West Virginia; Hagerstown, Maryland; Winchester, Virginia; United States
- City: Martinsburg, West Virginia
- Channels: Digital: 13 (VHF); Virtual: 60

Programming
- Affiliations: 60.1: Ion Television; for others, see § Subchannels

Ownership
- Owner: Ion Media; (Ion Television License, LLC)
- Sister stations: WPXW-TV, WMAR-TV

History
- Founded: May 21, 1990
- First air date: October 1, 1991
- Former call signs: WYVN (1991–1996); WSHE-TV (1996–1998)
- Former channel numbers: Analog: 60 (UHF, 1991–2009); Digital: 12 (VHF, 2000–2020)
- Former affiliations: Fox (1991–1993); Independent (1993–1994); Dark (1994–1996); inTV (1996–1998)
- Call sign meaning: West Virginia's Pax; satellite of WPXW-TV

Technical information
- Licensing authority: FCC
- Facility ID: 23264
- ERP: 4.2 kW
- HAAT: 327.5 m (1,074 ft)
- Transmitter coordinates: 39°14′21″N 77°46′16″W

Links
- Public license information: Public file; LMS
- Website: iontelevision.com

WWPX-TV (channel 60) is a television station licensed to Martinsburg, West Virginia, United States, broadcasting the Ion Television network to the northwestern portion of the Washington, D.C., television market. It is owned by the Ion Media subsidiary of the E. W. Scripps Company and maintains transmitter facilities on Blue Ridge Mountain east of Charles Town, West Virginia. WWPX-TV provides broadcast coverage of areas such as Martinsburg and the Eastern Panhandle of West Virginia; Hagerstown and Frederick, Maryland; Winchester and Leesburg, Virginia; and Chambersburg, Pennsylvania. It is paired with WPXW-TV (channel 66), licensed to Manassas, Virginia.

Channel 60 was allocated to Martinsburg in 1984, and in 1988 Ralph Albertazzie, a former pilot of Air Force One, obtained the construction permit. A barn in Martinsburg was refitted to serve as the station's studios and offices, and it began broadcasting as WYVN, a Fox affiliate, on October 1, 1991. Over a turbulent 30 months on the air, WYVN produced regional news coverage for Martinsburg and the surrounding area but struggled with cash flow problems. The station filed for bankruptcy reorganization a year after going on the air and canceled its local news department. When it appeared that major creditors would not accept an offer made for the station, the bankruptcy court ordered WYVN off the air in September 1993. Green River Broadcasting agreed to buy the station in September 1993; it went back on the air, without Fox programming, and local news resumed in January 1994. Green River was unable to put together a financing plan; the news department was discontinued for a second time after a month and a half on the air, and the station left the air on April 1, when the studios were foreclosed upon.

The license was transferred back to the bankruptcy court and sold to Paxson Communications Corporation in late 1994. The station returned to the air in 1996 as WSHE-TV, airing programming from Paxson's Infomall TV network of infomercials. It changed call signs to WWPX-TV in 1998 ahead of the launch of Pax, predecessor to Ion. Since 2002, it has operated as a satellite station of WPXW-TV.

== WYVN: Your Valley News ==
=== Construction ===
In 1984, the Federal Communications Commission (FCC) allocated channel 60 to Martinsburg, West Virginia, on the petition of David Sparks of Knoxville, Tennessee. The commission received three applications for channel 60, from Hefty Communications of Cromwell, Connecticut; B&D Broadcasting of Tyler, Texas; and Ralph Albertazzie, former presidential pilot on Air Force One and state commerce commissioner and owner of a truck stop on Interstate 81. Albertazzie beat out the other contenders for the channel and was awarded a construction permit in August 1988. Albertazzie initially teamed with Linda Plemons, a consultant who was trying to build WKRP-TV in Charleston; rejecting sites in downtown Martinsburg as too unsafe, they began refitting a barn off Tuscarora Pike to serve as channel 60's studio. In this phase, the station bore the call sign WEWV. The station was then put into a new company, Flying A Communications. The two later had a falling out, leading Albertazzie to fire Plemons and to continuing litigation as to whether she owned any portion of the station. Flying A was owned by Albertazzie and 16 limited partners.

By January 1990, Albertazzie's station had a new call sign: WYVN, for "Your Valley News". Albertazzie promised coverage of local news and sports for the Shenandoah, Cumberland, and Potomac valleys. Work began to refit the 187-year-old barn, with gun slots still in the walls, for a new life as a TV station, and channel 60 obtained an affiliation with the Fox network. Former WHAG-TV news anchor Gary Portmess returned to the region to serve as vice president of programming and sales. After equipment delays and contractual issues with bank loans, WYVN began broadcasting on October 1, 1991. The first day had an inauspicious start as a Berkeley County building inspector called the station during its opening program, threatening to take it off the air because the temporary tower on North Mountain had been erected without a permit. Two weeks later, the local newscasts began to air. Within four months, WYVN was on most of the area's cable television systems.

Portmess resigned in March 1992, saying he was "burned out" from the task of starting channel 60. In September, its 10 p.m. newscast was trimmed to a half-hour, reportedly at the suggestion of Fox to prepare for a possible late night national show. The half-hour was filled by a variety of weekly local programs, including the call-in show Four-State Live and entertainment magazine WYVN Extra. Other local programs included Rock 60, Face Off, Valley Close-up, and a local Fox Kids Club program. Carol LaFever replaced Portmess as general manager.

=== First bankruptcy ===
On October 7, 1992, WYVN filed for Chapter 11 bankruptcy reorganization after three creditors filed a petition to force an involuntary Chapter 7 liquidation. The station claimed in its newscasts that cash flow problems, the ongoing early 1990s recession, and loan difficulties led to the bankruptcy filing. Higher-than-expected renovation costs for the barn also were cited as a reason. The filing came the same day WYVN was covering one of its largest news stories, the crash of a West Virginia Air National Guard C-130E transport plane. At noon, a seven-minute newscast paired with CNN Headline News was blown out to provide a half-hour of coverage. WYVN footage was picked up by the major networks, and its reporters contributed to national media coverage of the incident. In response to the bankruptcy, the station cut high-priced syndicated programs such as A Current Affair and Live with Regis and Kathie Lee from its schedule. Meanwhile, legal issues nearly led to the station's cancellation. Since it had started, the station had been operating under special temporary authority to use its temporary antenna; station management, per LaFever, had deliberately waited on a permanent antenna due to re-regulation of the cable industry.

WYVN ceased producing local newscasts on May 20, 1993, after 19 months. News employees had not been paid since April 17. Weeks after the news department folded, WYVN won five West Virginia Associated Press awards, including for its coverage of the crash.

At a bankruptcy hearing on June 16, 1993, judge Edward Friend ordered the station transferred to the United States Trustee's Office and prepared to convert the proceeding to a Chapter 7 liquidation. The station was scheduled to be taken off the air, but the trustee's office analyzed whether to put it back on the air. Albertazzie attempted to put together new funding to keep WYVN on the air, but trustee David Savasten took over and kept WYVN on the air while a sale was attempted. Savasten also brought back former general manager Carol LaFever to run the station and help find a buyer. A noon magazine program debuted in July, the first new local program on the air in months.

Many potential buyers passed up on the station, claiming it was overvalued on the basis of its poor cash flow. One group came forward in August. Benchmark Communications of Baltimore, which owned 20 radio stations (including WUSQ-FM in Winchester, Virginia) but no television properties, submitted a letter of intent to buy channel 60. Though it withdrew its offer after it was revealed in the press, it entered a $1.4 million bid for WYVN the next month. Benchmark was the only one of six parties who had made serious inquiries to submit a bid. Despite the trustee's recommendation to approve the Benchmark sale, WYVN's two largest creditors balked. Farmers and Merchants Bank–Martinsburg (F&M) and Dana Commercial Credit objected to the bid, saying it provided insufficient detail about how the money would be divided among creditors. Flying A owed $2.4 million, including $1.5 million to Dana and $650,000 to F&M. Dana owned the station's equipment. Benchmark dropped its offer, and a second group—Kentucky-based Green River Broadcasting, owner of two Fox affiliates in that state—offered $1.5 million. Friend rejected the bid, forcing WYVN off the air on September 17, 1993.

=== Green River ownership and second bankruptcy ===
During this time, Green River increased its offer to $1.65 million, the minimum the creditors had sought. This time, the principal creditors agreed. As part of the sales agreement with Green River, WYVN went back on the air on September 28, this time without its Fox affiliation as an independent station, and announced plans to resume news coverage by the end of 1993 and expanded the noon show into a full hour. To make up for the lost Fox programming, the station added syndicated sports packages including Big East Conference football and tape-delayed high school and West Virginia Mountaineers football.

Friend approved the sale to Green River on October 7, wiping out many smaller creditors but providing funds for F&M and Dana. Some $4.4 million in debts went unpaid; Friend noted, "This is not a great day in bankruptcy court. But it is an honest day." The return of news was formally announced in November. Former anchors Jeff Hertrick and Kelly Haines, along with several other employees, returned to WYVN for the second news department. The newscasts, airing five nights a week, debuted in the first week of January 1994. Guy Fletcher, columnist for The Herald-Mail, noted of the revival, "There seems to be very little of the new WYVN news, except for a few new faces, that wasn't on the old."

The news was back, and so too were the financial difficulties. On January 28, five former WYVN employees sued the station, which LaFever noted was still experiencing cash flow problems, for back wages dating to December 1993; they were the first of 12 employees to sue within three months. Their attorney claimed that Green River Broadcasting of Martinsburg never registered to do business in West Virginia, nor did it pay unemployment or workers compensation taxes. Bill Speer, the owner of Green River in Kentucky, almost called in his loan, which would have forced the station off the air; Green River's business manager, Ben Ewing, who actually made the purchase as Green River Broadcasting of Martinsburg. The local news department, which had operated without computers for two weeks, was shut down for the second and final time on February 16, with Ewing stating he would sell the station amid an inability to find investors and that his proposed new buyer—a home shopping broadcaster—had no interest in running local news. On February 25, WYVN finally got a regular broadcast license, 28 months after it began broadcasting.

On April 1, 1994, on the steps of the Berkeley County Courthouse, F&M sold the mortgage on the barn to itself. Later that day, it moved to evict WYVN from the building, forcing channel 60 off the air. The action was known to be coming: office equipment was loaded into trailers, tapes of syndicated programs were prepared to be returned, and channel 60's programming was switched to infomercials from MOR Music TV. For 15 minutes, the station scrolled a message:

WYVN TV60 in Martinsburg, W.Va., is temporarily ending transmission. Thank you for your support.

Savasten, the bankruptcy trustee, told the court that he had inadvertently sold the license to Green River Broadcasting of Martinsburg and then resigned. Friend ordered the company to return the license to the court on April 18. The new trustee, Gary Rosen, was ordered to sell the remains of the station or they would be sold at auction. Jack Marsh, a Baltimore docummentary filmmaker, and Colorado TV station owner David Drucker and his GreenTV Corporation made bids for the permit. Green River Broadcasting of Martinsburg later filed for Chapter 7 bankruptcy, claiming assets of $50.

== Paxson–Ion ownership ==
Paxson Communications Corporation acquired the license out of bankruptcy for $1.9 million in November 1994. Paxson's interest in the station was because must-carry rules would mean it would have to be included on cable systems in the entire Washington, D.C., and Baltimore markets. After initially saying it was seeking "an idea that will make money and sense", Paxson announced the station would air its Infomall TV service of infomercials and religious programs. It returned to the air on September 1, 1996, as WSHE-TV. The change was made as a clean break with the troubled history of WYVN and served to "park" a heritage call sign that Paxson had recently removed from one of its FM stations in Miami and quickly placed on a station in Orlando. In January 1997, Paxson Communications sold the station to DP Media, a company owned by Lowell Paxson's son Devon.

Ahead of the 1998 launch of the Pax network, WSHE-TV changed its call sign to WWPX-TV. It was one of two stations in the Washington market to flip to Pax, the other being WPXW-TV (channel 66), licensed to Manassas, Virginia. In 2000, Paxson Communications acquired six DP Media stations, including WWPX-TV. In 2002, WWPX-TV converted to a satellite station of WPXW-TV. It could no longer afford its own staff of five master-control operators, and becoming a satellite allowed it to carry only the legal minimum of one manager and one engineer. Sales operations were shifted to Virginia, leaving no employees in the "broadcast barn".

After changing its name to i: Independent Television in 2005, the network became known as Ion Television in 2007, following the 2006 name change of Paxson Communications Corporation to Ion Media Networks. The E. W. Scripps Company acquired Ion in a deal announced in 2020 and completed in 2021.

== Technical information ==
=== Subchannels ===
WWPX-TV maintains transmitter facilities on Blue Ridge Mountain east of Charles Town, West Virginia.

Subchannels of WPXW-TV and WWPX-TV
Subchannel		Res.	Short name	Programming
WPXW-TV	WWPX-TV	Res.	Short name	Programming
66.1	60.1	720p	ION	Ion Television
66.2	60.2	720p	Bounce	Bounce TV
66.3	60.3	480i	CourtTV	Court TV
66.4	60.4	480i	Laff	Laff
66.5	60.5	480i	IONPlus	Ion Plus
66.6	60.6	480i	BUSTED	Busted
66.7	60.7	480i	GameSho	Game Show Central
66.8	60.8	480i	HSN	HSN

=== Analog-to-digital conversion ===
WWPX-TV shut down its analog signal, over UHF channel 60, on June 12, 2009, the official date on which full-power television stations in the United States transitioned from analog to digital broadcasts under federal mandate. The station's digital signal remained on its pre-transition VHF channel 12, using virtual channel 60.
