= WMAR-TV =

Television station in Baltimore

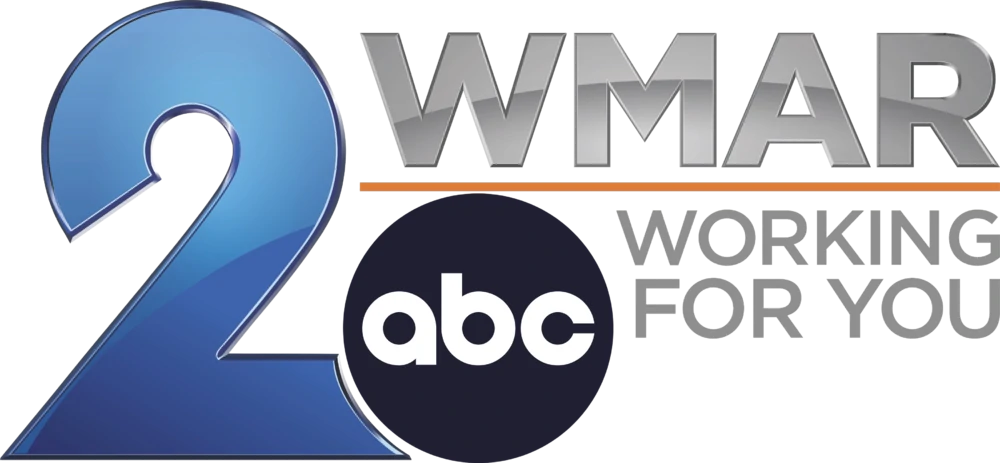
- Baltimore, Maryland; United States
- Channels: Digital: 27 (UHF); Virtual: 2
- Branding: WMAR 2

Programming
- Affiliations: 2.1: ABC; for others, see § Subchannels

Ownership
- Owner: E. W. Scripps Company; (Scripps Broadcasting Holdings LLC)
- Sister stations: WPXW-TV; WWPX-TV

History
- Founded: May 16, 1946
- First air date: October 30, 1947
- Former channel numbers: Analog: 2 (VHF, 1947–2009); Digital: 52 (UHF, 1999–2009), 38 (UHF, 2009–2020)
- Former affiliations: Independent (1947–1948); CBS (1948–1981); DuMont (secondary, March–November 1948); NBC (1981–1995)
- Call sign meaning: Maryland

Technical information
- Licensing authority: FCC
- Facility ID: 59442
- ERP: 830 kW
- HAAT: 307 m (1,007 ft)
- Transmitter coordinates: 39°20′5″N 76°39′2″W

Links
- Public license information: Public file; LMS
- Website: www.wmar2news.com

WMAR-TV (channel 2) is a television station in Baltimore, Maryland, United States, affiliated with ABC and owned by the E. W. Scripps Company. The station's studios and offices are located on York Road (Maryland Route 45) in Towson north of the Baltimore City–Baltimore County border. Its transmitter and antenna, which is on a landmark three-pronged candelabra broadcast tower, is located on Television Hill in the Woodberry neighborhood of Baltimore.

WMAR-TV's fifth subchannel broadcasts Scripps-owned Ion Television. It is sister to WPXW-TV in Manassas, Virginia, which serves the Washington, D.C., area, and satellite station WWPX-TV in Martinsburg, West Virginia.

== History ==
=== Early years ===
WMAR first began broadcasting on October 30, 1947. It was the first television station in Maryland, and was the fourteenth commercial television station to sign on in the United States (another two stations were experimental). WMAR was founded by the A. S. Abell Company, publisher of the Sunpapers (The Baltimore Sun and its now-defunct evening counterpart, The Evening Sun) and was the first completed phase of the Sunpapers' expansion into broadcasting; the newspapers also held construction permits for WMAR-FM 97.9 MHz (unrelated to the later WIYY), which signed-on in January 1948 and a proposed WMAR (850 AM), which never made it to air. Channel 2's first broadcast was a pair of horse races emanating from Pimlico Race Course.

WMAR-TV's studios, offices, transmitter and tower were initially located at the present-day Bank of America Building in downtown Baltimore; the studios were later shifted into a larger space adjacent to the building. WMAR-TV moved into its present facility, known originally as "Television Park" on York Road, in May 1963.

Channel 2 was an independent station at its launch, largely because at the time it was not clear whether Baltimore would be part of the Washington, D.C. market (Baltimore is 45 minutes northeast of Washington, and most of the Washington stations decently cover the Baltimore area for major news stories and weather reports). In 1948, however, the Federal Communications Commission (FCC) made Baltimore a separate media market. On March 29, 1948, WMAR-TV was announced as CBS' third full-time television affiliate, after WCBS-TV in New York City and WCAU-TV in Philadelphia. It also had secondary affiliations with ABC and DuMont for its early days, but it later lost both affiliations to upstart WAAM-TV (channel 13, now WJZ-TV) when the station signed on in November.

One of WMAR's early local personalities was Jim McKay, who was the first voice heard when the station began its test broadcasts, and called the horse race program that inaugurated the station's official launch. McKay later moved over to CBS briefly before achieving greater fame on ABC as host of Wide World of Sports and Olympic coverage. Another was Helen Delich Bentley, a maritime editor for the Baltimore Sun who hosted The Port That Built a City, a weekly review presenting maritime, shipping and transportation-related news. (Bentley later ran several times and was finally elected as a U.S. representative from Maryland, serving several terms as a Republican. By 2006, the Port of Baltimore was renamed symbolically for her.)

In 1959, WMAR-TV teamed up with WBAL-TV (channel 11) and WJZ-TV to build the world's first three-antenna candelabra tower. The new 730-foot (223 m) tower was built on the newly named "Television Hill" (formerly known as "Malden Hill") in the Woodberry neighborhood of Baltimore, which significantly expanded the station's signal coverage well beyond Central Maryland. During the 1970s, the FCC tightened its cross-ownership rules, eventually barring common ownership between a newspaper and a television or radio station in the same city without a waiver. However, the combination of the Sunpapers and WMAR-TV was one of several that were "grandfathered" under these rules.

=== Switch to NBC ===
On March 3, 1981, CBS announced that it would be moving its affiliation to WBAL-TV, Baltimore's NBC station. Among its reasons for making the switch, CBS cited WMAR-TV's poor newscast ratings and frequent preemptions of network shows for syndicated programs, local specials, and sports coverage. While the station briefly considered becoming independent once again, channel 2 quickly cut a deal with NBC that May to take over that network's affiliation from channel 11. Baltimore's first affiliation switch took place on August 30, 1981. The final CBS program to air on channel 2 before the switch was an NFL preseason game between the Houston Oilers and the Dallas Cowboys, airing live at 9 p.m. Eastern Time on the night before the affiliation switch.

=== Strike ===
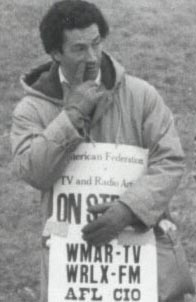
AFTRA member Andy Barth of WMAR-TV, Channel 2 on picket line, March 1982.

On March 1, 1982, after negotiations between WMAR-TV management and the American Federation of Television and Radio Artists (AFTRA) failed, all of the station's on-air talent, except one, went on strike. AFTRA members, joined by the Teamsters, the Communication Workers of America and other local unions, picketed the station's offices on York Road and Abell's offices at North Calvert and East Centre Streets. When color announcer (and long-time popular Baltimore Orioles third baseman) Brooks Robinson refused to cross the picket line at the start of the baseball season, the strike ended. The following day, both news anchors, Tom Sweeney and Curt Anderson, were fired.

=== Ownership changes ===
On May 28, 1986, the A. S. Abell Company was purchased by the Los Angeles-based Times Mirror Company, the then-publisher of the Los Angeles Times. With the loss of the grandfathered protection between the former Abell media properties, Times-Mirror opted to keep The Sunpapers and sold WMAR-TV (and WRLH-TV in Richmond) to Gillett Communications in July 1986. After filing for bankruptcy sometime later, Gillett restructured its television holdings into SCI Television, and in the early 1990s, SCI put WMAR-TV back on the market.

The Cincinnati-based E. W. Scripps Company announced its purchase of the station in the summer of 1990, but in February 1991 the transfer was canceled after Scripps accused Gillett of misreporting WMAR's financial statements. Gillett then took legal action against Scripps, but both sides settled and the sale went forward. Scripps took control of the station in the spring of 1991.

Then, in September, Sinclair Broadcast Group, the owner of WBFF (channel 45), took the bold step of challenging WMAR-TV's pending license renewal and filing its own competing application for a new station on channel 2. Sinclair argued that out-of-town ownership could not effectively serve the city's public interest, especially with such a valuable channel allocation; the channel 2 analog signal traveled a very long distance under normal conditions. Sinclair argued that as an established local broadcaster, it should receive the allocation instead. The gambit did not work, and WMAR-TV remained on channel 2.

=== ABC affiliation ===
In June 1994, Scripps and ABC announced a long-term affiliation deal, which resulted in three Scripps-owned stations switching to ABC. WMAR-TV was included in the deal, and Channel 2 would displace Baltimore's longtime ABC affiliate, Westinghouse Broadcasting-owned WJZ-TV. ABC agreed to the deal as a condition of keeping its affiliation on Scripps' two biggest stations, WXYZ-TV in Detroit and WEWS in Cleveland; both of those outlets had been heavily wooed by CBS, which was about to lose its longtime Detroit and Cleveland affiliates (these two were sisters of WMAR-TV when it was under Gillett ownership) to Fox as part of that network's affiliation deal with New World Communications. Locally, it triggered Baltimore's second network affiliation swap, which saw WMAR-TV switch to ABC, CBS move to WJZ-TV after concluding a groupwide affiliation deal with Westinghouse, and NBC return to WBAL-TV. NBC first approached WJZ about negotiating an affiliation deal, ultimately to be turned down by its then-owner Westinghouse Broadcasting. All ABC programs turned down by WJZ-TV would air on WMAR-TV instead, forcing all preempted NBC programs to air on WBAL-TV, and preempted CBS shows would air on WJZ-TV instead, as the contracts did not expire until January 1995. The second switch occurred on January 2, 1995, with the FedEx Orange Bowl between the Miami Hurricanes and the Nebraska Cornhuskers being the final NBC program to air on channel 2. As a result, channel 2 became one of the few stations in the country to have been a primary affiliate with each of the "Big Three" networks.

ABC had been reluctant to drop its affiliation with WJZ-TV, which had been the highest-rated station in Baltimore for over a quarter-century and was one of the strongest ABC affiliates in the nation. In contrast, WMAR-TV had been a ratings also-ran for three decades. Indeed, ABC's ratings in Baltimore went into a steep decline after the switch, with a number of programs falling from first to third in the Baltimore ratings in one stroke.

In 1996, a year after the affiliation change, station management opted not to renew channel 2's carriage of The Oprah Winfrey Show, deciding instead to take a chance on the new Rosie O'Donnell Show. The move proved costly in the long term, as market leader WBAL-TV picked up Oprah until its 2011 end, and Rosie (which moved to WJZ-TV in late 2000) lasted only seven years, ending in 2002. The switch resulted in a change of fortune between the two stations, with WBAL's 5–6:30 p.m. news block sustaining strong ratings, while WMAR suffered a steady decline in the same timeslot.

On May 13, 2014, after a station security guard denied him entry into WMAR-TV's studio/offices, 28-year-old Vladimir Baptiste crashed into the building in a pickup truck, which had been stolen around noon from a Maryland State Highway Administration subcontractor. All of the station's approximately 120 employees were evacuated and the building was placed on lockdown as Baltimore County Police officers searched for the suspect. Channel 2 ran an automated feed of ABC programming for four hours, before going dark for about 1 hour and 20 minutes; a satellite relay with Phoenix sister station KNXV-TV was then established late that afternoon until WMAR master control operators were able to resume broadcasting from the studio. Police captured the man just after 4:30 p.m. that afternoon, as he was watching news coverage of the incident in one of the facility's offices. Officers found weapons in the truck, but there were no reports of gunshots being fired. No staffers inside the building were injured. Baptiste was taken to a hospital for a mental evaluation, and was later charged with three counts of attempted second degree murder.

On April 16, 2018, WMAR changed its branding to "WMAR 2" to trade on the station's heritage as Maryland's first television station, and emphasize its "long-standing focus on Maryland and its people." It also adopted a modernized version of the stylized "2" logo it used in one form or another from 1975 to 1998.

As part of a Scripps trial in a dozen smaller markets, WMAR removed anchors from its evening and 11 p.m. newscasts on August 13, 2026. The newscasts instead contain a package of pre-recorded local and national stories, using graphics as transitions, as well as a taped weather segment. A live meteorologist remains in the studio in case of a need to interrupt programming due to severe weather. The following week, WMAR removed anchors from its 4:30–7 a.m. morning newscast.

== Programming ==
As a CBS affiliate, WMAR-TV preempted an hour of the network's weekday morning daytime schedule, as well as CBS' late night programming. However, this was not a problem for Baltimore area viewers, as most of the area got a decent signal from WTOP-TV in Washington (now WUSA). From 1961 until 1980, the station was also co-owned with fellow CBS affiliate WBOC-TV in Salisbury.

Channel 2 continued to preempt network programming as an NBC affiliate. The Tonight Show Starring Johnny Carson was not carried by WMAR-TV for several years in the mid-1980s as the station chose to air Thicke of the Night, and later syndicated sitcom reruns following the 11 p.m. newscast. Some of the network's daytime programming was preempted as well. Both Tonight and preempted daytime programs were aired on then-independent stations WBFF and WNUV, though Baltimore viewers could also watch the entire NBC lineup on network-owned WRC-TV in Washington. Additionally, WGAL-TV in Lancaster, Pennsylvania, could be seen in areas north of Baltimore County.

When WMAR-TV joined ABC, the station tape delayed some of the network's daytime shows to late night, and preempted nearly half of its Saturday morning lineup. This was however fixed several years later, with The View airing in its recommended 11 a.m. timeslot, and adding one of the Saturday morning programs, while preempting non-E/I programs like The Bugs Bunny & Tweety Show. WMAR-TV now usually runs the network's entire lineup. The station was Baltimore's home to The Jerry Lewis MDA Labor Day Telethon for nearly three decades until it moved to WNUV-TV (channel 54); in 2013, the telethon moved back to WMAR-TV, airing on ABC as a two-hour program titled the MDA Show of Strength, for its final two years of its run.

Like all other Scripps-owned ABC stations, WMAR-TV preempted an airing of Saving Private Ryan in 2004.

Until September 17, 2012, Jeopardy! and Wheel of Fortune aired on channel 2 from the beginning of their runs in 1984 and 1983 respectively. WMAR dropped them as part of a corporate effort to emphasize lower-cost original programming across its entire group. The two shows immediately moved to Fox affiliate WBFF, where they remain.

=== Sports programming ===
WMAR formerly boasted one of the most respected sports departments in the region, going back to the 1950s when it was the Baltimore Colts' flagship station, with popular announcer Chuck Thompson. Its post-game show, Colt Wrap-Up, was hosted by WMAR personality George Rogers with ex-Colt Joe Campanella.

WMAR broadcast Baltimore Orioles games from 1979 to 1993, becoming one of the last "Big Three"-affiliated stations to carry baseball games on a regular basis.

WMAR also broadcasts the annual Turkey Bowl between Calvert Hall College High School and Loyola Blakefield on Thanksgiving morning.

==== Lacrosse ====
WMAR is best known outside of Baltimore as a pioneering broadcaster of lacrosse. In 1998, the Johns Hopkins University athletics administration, seeking ways to increase exposure for its powerhouse men's lacrosse team, proposed that WMAR broadcast their rivalry game against the University of Maryland. Lacrosse historically enjoys wide popularity in Maryland, and at the time, was rarely if ever broadcast on television. The station was also actively seeking a greater commitment to local sports coverage to differentiate itself from its competitors. It had tested the waters with a one-off broadcast of a basketball game between Coppin State and Morgan State earlier that year. WMAR readily agreed and committed to broadcast two more of Hopkins' home games against local teams: Loyola College and Towson University.

Sponsorship and viewership for these initial games was high enough to support the beginning of a full game-of-the-week package beginning with the 1999 collegiate lacrosse season. Coverage expanded to home games of other local teams, including Maryland, Loyola, Towson, the U.S. Naval Academy, UMBC, Stevenson University, Salisbury University, and Gettysburg College. The games aired live on Saturday afternoons and evenings, preempting any scheduled network programming. WMAR began partnering with ESPN to produce the games after Hopkins signed a deal to place all of its men's team's games on the fledgling ESPNU in 2005; ESPN also started simulcasting WMAR's selected game of the week on ESPNU for a national audience.

Lacrosse broadcasts ended after the 2011 season, as ESPN decided to end its production partnership in favor of increased coverage on its own networks. Station general manager Bill Hooper stated the broadcasts would lose money without a partner to share production costs, and an attempt to work with Comcast SportsNet instead fell through.

A notable alumnus is Quint Kessenich, four-time lacrosse All-American with Johns Hopkins, who began his commentary career at WMAR and has since moved on to ESPN.

=== News operation ===
WMAR Comcast WeatherNet Digital screenshot.

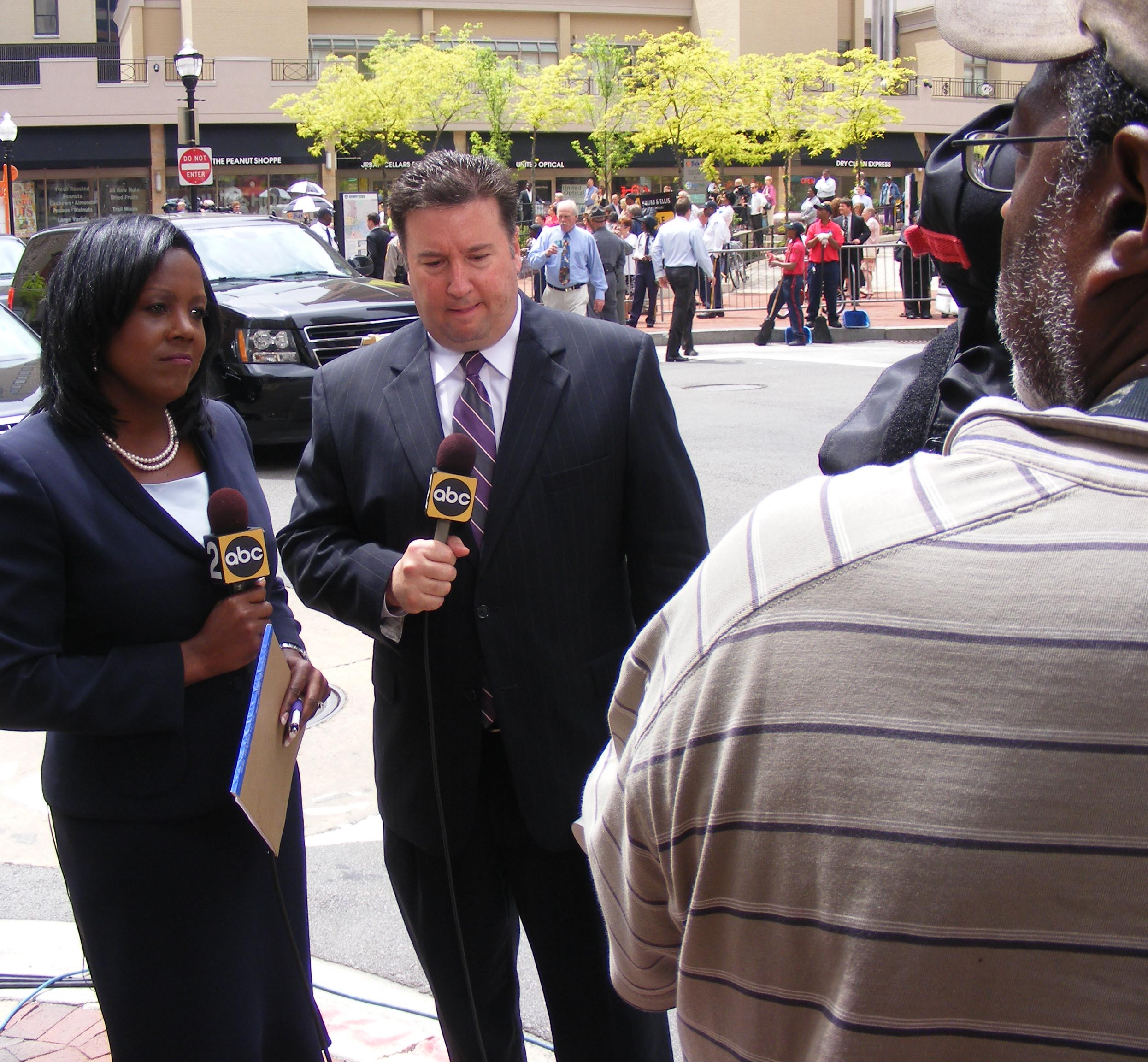
WMAR-TV anchors Kelly Swoope and Jamie Costello prepare for a live shot in downtown Baltimore, April 27, 2011.

WMAR-TV presently broadcasts 26 hours of locally produced newscasts each week (with five hours each weekday and one hour on Sundays); with regards to the amount of news programming, it is the lowest output among Baltimore's television stations. Unlike most news-producing ABC affiliates that are located in the Eastern Time Zone, WMAR does not air a newscast in the weekday midday timeslot; it also holds the distinction of being the largest news-producing "Big Three" station by market size that does not air any local newscasts on Saturdays (although WMAR does produce local weather cut-ins that are shown during the weekend edition of Good Morning America).

WMAR is also one of ten television stations that air the "Don't Waste Your Money" series of consumer reports from John Matarese, based at Cincinnati sister station WCPO-TV.

Despite its newspaper roots and its status as the oldest television station in Maryland, WMAR's newscasts have been in last place among Baltimore's "Big Three" network affiliates since the early 1960s, and the station has not been a significant factor in the news ratings since the late 1970s. For most of the last four decades, it has been the third station in what has essentially been a two-station market, trailing WJZ-TV and WBAL-TV by wide margins. This was the case even during the 1980s, with NBC's powerhouse prime time lineup as a lead-in. As such, it is currently one of ABC's weakest affiliates, especially in a top-50 market. By contrast, WJZ-TV had been one of ABC's strongest affiliates during its last quarter-century with the network. In March 2021 sweeps, WMAR was rated last among adults 25–54 in all timeslots, with its audience shares averaging one-third to one-quarter of those of WJZ-TV and WBAL-TV.

On October 4, 2010, WMAR-TV became the last station in the market and the last Scripps-owned television station at the time to begin broadcasting its local newscasts in high definition. On April 18, 2011, WMAR became the first television station in Baltimore to expand its weekday morning newscast to the 4:30 a.m. timeslot.

==== Notable former on-air staff ====
- Curt Anderson – news anchor (1980–1982)
- Andy Barth
- Nelson Benton (1982–1983)
- Keith Cate
- Veronica Johnson – meteorologist (1996–1999)
- Stu Kerr (1928–1994) – At station 1952–1981, longtime "public face" of the station, "jack-of-all-trades" from various hosts of early morning children's shows – a janitor on The Early Riser, and comic roles as "Professor Kool" and "Bozo the Clown" to "Mr. Fortune" on Dialing for Dollars and weather forecaster.
- Tom Marr – WMAR weekend sports anchor from 1976 to 1979. Former morning news anchor and news director
- Jim McKay – did early first broadcasts in late 1940s
- Uma Pemmaraju
- John Saunders
- Sally Thorner
- Brian Wood

== Technical information ==
=== Subchannels ===
WMAR-TV broadcasts from a transmitter facility on Television Hill in the Woodberry neighborhood of Baltimore. The station's signal is multiplexed:

Subchannels of WMAR-TV
Subchannel	Res.	Short name	Programming
2.1	720p	WMAR-HD	ABC
2.2	480i	GRIT	Grit
2.3	480i	BOUNCE	Bounce TV
2.4	480i	MYSTERY	Ion Mystery
2.5	480i	ION TV	Ion
2.6	480i	CourtTV	Court TV
2.7	480i	Newsy	Busted
2.8	480i	HSN	HSN
54.2	480i	Antenna	Antenna TV (WNUV) (4:3)

Broadcast on behalf of another station

=== Analog-to-digital conversion ===
WMAR-TV shut down its analog signal, over VHF channel 2, on June 12, 2009, the official date on which full-power television stations in the United States transitioned from analog to digital broadcasts under federal mandate. The station's digital signal relocated from its pre-transition UHF channel 52, which was among the high band UHF channels (52–69) that were removed from broadcasting use as a result of the transition, to UHF channel 38, using virtual channel 2.

As channel 38 was also removed from television use as a part of the repacking process following the 2016–2017 FCC incentive auction, WMAR-TV relocated to UHF channel 27 on July 2, 2020.
