= Andy Barth =

American journalist (born 1947)

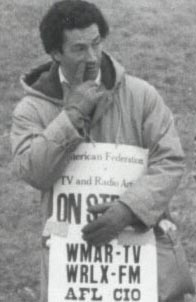

Andrew Charles Barth (born 1947) is a former newscaster for WMAR-TV in Baltimore, Maryland, USA.

Barth was born into a political family in Washington, D.C. His father was an editorialist for The Washington Post. He attended law school after graduating from Johns Hopkins University in 1968. He soon worked as a reporter for the Minneapolis Tribune to support his family. Barth is married with two daughters.

Barth began his career as a newscaster for WMAR in 1970, leaving briefly to work on New York City mayor John Lindsay's campaign in 1971. He continued as a newscaster until retiring in December 2005.

He ran unsuccessfully as a Democratic candidate for congressman from Maryland's Third Congressional District in 2006.

He is now reporting for WTTG in Washington, D.C..

Barth was press secretary for Republican Robert Ehrlich's 2010 campaign for Governor of Maryland.
