= Maryland State Commission on Criminal Sentencing Policy =

Agency of the Maryland state government

Maryland State Commission on Criminal Sentencing Policy, (MSCCSP), is an agency within the state government of Maryland, that sets guidelines which are used by Maryland circuit court judges in sentencing persons convicted of crimes in the state.

== Background ==
The Maryland General Assembly has charged the commission to "adopt existing sentencing guidelines for sentencing within the limits established by law which shall be considered by the sentencing court in determining the appropriate sentence for defendants who plead guilty or nolo contendere to, or who were found guilty of crimes in a circuit court." The commission was after several studies over a period of time showed the defendants in some of the state's less populated areas got harsher sentences than those in the rest of the state. There was also some concern over racial disparities in sentencing in criminal cases. The MSCCSP can set guidelines that are advisory, Maryland judges are not required to adhere to the guidelines; judges in the federal system generally are.

The MSCCSP was established in 1999, it collects sentencing guidelines worksheets and automates the information; monitors sentencing practices, including judicial compliance with the guidelines; and, as necessary, adopts changes to the guidelines. The Commission integrates correctional options into the guidelines and establishes criteria for determining which defendants should be eligible for correctional options.

== Commission members ==
- Howard S. Chasanow, Chair (chosen by Governor), 2011
- Appointed by Governor to 4-year terms (term expires):
  - James V. Anthenelli, Esq., (2007)
  - Paul F. Enzinna, Esq., (2009
  - Laura Leigh Martin, Esq., (2009)
  - Charles F. Welford, Ph.D., (2009)
  - Marcus L. Brown, (2011)
  - Richard A. Finci, Esq., (2011)
  - Maj. Bernard B. Foster Sr., (2011)
  - Joseph I. Cassilly, (2013)
- Appointed by the President of the Maryland Senate:
  - Lisa A. Gladden
  - Delores G. Kelley
- Appointed by the Speaker of the Maryland House of Delegates:
  - Curtis S. Anderson
  - Joseph F. Vallario Jr.
- Appointed by Chief Judge, Court of Appeals:
  - John P. Morrissey
  - John C. Themelis
  - Alfred Nance
- Ex officio:
  - Arrie W. Davis, designee of Chief Judge, Court of Appeals;
  - Brian Frosh, Attorney General;
  - Paul DeWolfe, Public Defender;
  - Gary D. Maynard, Secretary of Public Safety & Correctional Services.

Executive Director:

- David A. Soule, Ph.D.

== Subcommittees ==
Much of the commission's work is done in its two subcommittees with the commission voting on either subcommittee's recommendations during regular meetings of the commission.

=== Sentencing Guidelines Subcommittee ===
The Sentencing Guidelines Subcommittee all new and revised offenses adopted by the General Assembly and provides recommendations to the full Commission for seriousness category classification. Additionally, the Sentencing Guidelines Subcommittee regularly reviews suggested revisions to the guidelines calculation process and reports to the overall Commission on guidelines compliance data.

Subcommittee Members:

- Charles F. Wellford, Ph.D., Chair
- Leonard C. Collins Jr., Charles County State's Attorney
- Senator Delores G. Kelley
- Patrick Kent, Office of the Public Defender
- Judge John C. Themelis

=== Subcommittee on Sentencing Drug Offenders ===
The Subcommittee on Sentencing Drug Offenders was established in 2007 to review options available to the judiciary for sentencing drug related felons.

Subcommittee Members:

- Delegate Curt Anderson, Chair
- Shannon E. Avery (representing Secretary Gary D. Maynard)
- Leonard C. Collins Jr., Charles County State's Attorney
- Major Bernard B. Foster Sr.
- Senator Lisa A. Gladden
- Laura L. Martin, Esq.
- Judge John P. Morrissey
