= WPXW-TV =

Television station in Manassas, Virginia

- Manassas, Virginia; Washington, D.C.; United States
- City: Manassas, Virginia
- Channels: Digital: 35 (UHF); Virtual: 66

Programming
- Affiliations: 66.1: Ion Television; for others, see § Subchannels

Ownership
- Owner: Ion Media; (Ion Television License, LLC)
- Sister stations: WWPX-TV, WMAR-TV

History
- First air date: April 2, 1978
- Former call signs: WTKK (1978–1994); WVVI (1994–1998)
- Former channel numbers: Analog: 66 (UHF, 1978–2009); Digital: 43 (UHF, 2001–2009), 34 (UHF, 2009–2020)
- Former affiliations: Religious Ind. (1978–1994); ValueVision (1994–1997); inTV (1997–1998)
- Call sign meaning: Pax Washington, D.C.

Technical information
- Licensing authority: FCC
- Facility ID: 74091
- ERP: 949 kW
- HAAT: 234.1 m (768 ft)
- Transmitter coordinates: 38°57′49.9″N 77°6′17.2″W
- Repeater: WWPX-TV 60 Martinsburg, WV

Links
- Public license information: Public file; LMS
- Website: iontelevision.com

WPXW-TV (channel 66) is a television station licensed to Manassas, Virginia, United States, broadcasting the Ion Television network to the Washington, D.C., area. The station is owned by the Ion Media subsidiary of the E. W. Scripps Company, and broadcasts from a transmitter located on River Road in Bethesda, Maryland. The Ion network is also broadcast in the region from WWPX-TV (channel 60) in Martinsburg, West Virginia, which shares the same subchannels as WPXW-TV, and on the fifth subchannel of Scripps-owned ABC affiliate WMAR-TV (channel 2) in Baltimore.

Channel 66 went on the air April 2, 1978, as WTKK ("Witnessing the King of Kings"), a Christian station owned by Manassas-based National Capital Christian Broadcasting. The station's programming consisted of local and national religious shows, though in the 1980s it broadened its format to include some classic TV series. National Capital Christian Broadcasting sold channel 66 to home shopping network ValueVision in 1994, though the seller would continue to be investigated for fraud and misrepresentations to investors. The station had the call sign WVVI under ValueVision. Paxson Communications Corporation, forerunner to Ion Media, acquired WVVI-TV and incorporated it into its Infomall TV network, broadcasting infomercials and paid programs, in 1997; these stations formed the core of the Pax network, predecessor to Ion, in 1998.

== History ==
=== National Capital Christian Broadcasting ownership ===
In 1974, National Capital Christian Broadcasting (NCCB) began organizing to build a Christian- and family-oriented television station in Manassas, Virginia, which would serve greater Washington. This required petitioning the Federal Communications Commission (FCC) to allot channel 66 to Manassas.

Activity accelerated in 1977, when NCCB applied for the construction permit after having channel 66 approved to operate in Manassas. Raker bought a former school and church and converted it into a television studio. The FCC granted the permit on October 3, 1977, and WTKK ("Witnessing the King of Kings") began broadcasting on April 2, 1978—Easter Sunday. The fledgling station's finances were unsteady: within a year, it was described by program host Ken Connolly as "in a fight for life". Connolly's program marked the bulk of WTKK's local programming in 1979, alongside a children's show known as Beyond the Blue and a newscast. Raker—described financially by the head of the National Association of Religious Broadcasters as a "loner" compared to other similar ventures—was able to beg for equipment and money, including a used set and studio lights belonging to Good Morning America and a lease of the abandoned Baptist church, complete with an organ and stained glass windows. In 1982, the station increased its power to a full five million watts and moved its transmitter from Independent Hill to a new site in Fairfax Station; it was off the air for three months to make the move.

In 1983, channel 66 began to experiment with an increased secular programming schedule, as its all-religious lineup failed to attract viewers. With the addition of shows like The Lone Ranger, Green Acres, and Mister Ed, WTKK's ratings soared 1,000 percent from a 0.2 share to a 2.5 share in the span of a year. The station also had to hire advertising sales representatives to handle its increasing business. In November 1984, National Capital Christian Broadcasting expanded by starting WTLL (channel 63, "Witnessing the Lord of Lords") in Richmond; it was able to borrow money to start the Richmond station because of a land donation made by real estate developer Cecil D. Hylton. WTKK and WTLL shared some programming that was produced in Manassas, including the religious talk show Capital Life and an exercise program, Beverly Exercise. However, with continued money losses among independent TV stations, NCCB sold the Richmond station to Sudbrink Broadcasting in 1986.

=== ValueVision and Pax/Ion ownership ===
In 1994, WTKK was purchased by a subsidiary of ValueVision, a home shopping network, for $5.4 million. ValueVision at the same time acquired two other stations: WTWS-TV in New London, Connecticut, and KRTW in Baytown, Texas. On June 6, 1994, the call letters were changed to WVVI; it was one of as many as four company-owned stations. After National Capital Christian Broadcasting sold channel 66, it came under state government scrutiny for its methods of attracting investors. The Commonwealth's Attorney for Prince William County solicited a Virginia State Police investigation of NCCB in November 1996 after more than a dozen investors sued the company seeking the return of their investments over misrepresentations. The company filed for bankruptcy with assets of $430,000 and liabilities exceeding $9 million. Many of these investors had provided funds for expansions that never were undertaken. By 1998, a Virginia State Police agent had written in court filings that "as of this date, this investigator doesn't know how the ValueVision [sale] proceeds finally were used".

Paxson Communications agreed to acquire WVVI in 1996; the deal was for a $30 million purchase price plus another $10 million if the Supreme Court of the United States upheld must carry regulations that required Washington's cable systems to air the station in their lineups. Paxson closed on the deal on August 1, 1997, and replaced ValueVision's home shopping programming with its inTV infomercial service. On January 13, 1998, the call letters were changed to the current WPXW in advance of the launch of the Pax network later that year. The station aired Baltimore Orioles games in 2005, the first year that they shared the market with the Washington Nationals. After changing its name to i: Independent Television in 2005, the network became known as Ion Television in 2007.

== Technical information ==
=== Subchannels ===
Subchannels of WPXW-TV and WWPX-TV
Subchannel		Res.	Short name	Programming
WPXW-TV	WWPX-TV	Res.	Short name	Programming
66.1	60.1	720p	ION	Ion Television
66.2	60.2	720p	Bounce	Bounce TV
66.3	60.3	480i	CourtTV	Court TV
66.4	60.4	480i	Laff	Laff
66.5	60.5	480i	IONPlus	Ion Plus
66.6	60.6	480i	BUSTED	Busted
66.7	60.7	480i	GameSho	Game Show Central
66.8	60.8	480i	HSN	HSN

=== Analog-to-digital conversion ===
WPXW-TV shut down its analog signal, over UHF channel 66, on June 12, 2009, the official date on which full-power television stations in the United States transitioned from analog to digital broadcasts under federal mandate. The station's digital signal moved from its pre-transition UHF channel 43 to channel 34, using virtual channel 66. WPXW-TV relocated its signal from channel 34 to channel 35 on August 2, 2019, as a result of the 2016 United States wireless spectrum auction.
