= Ken Harris (politician) =

American politician (1963–2008)

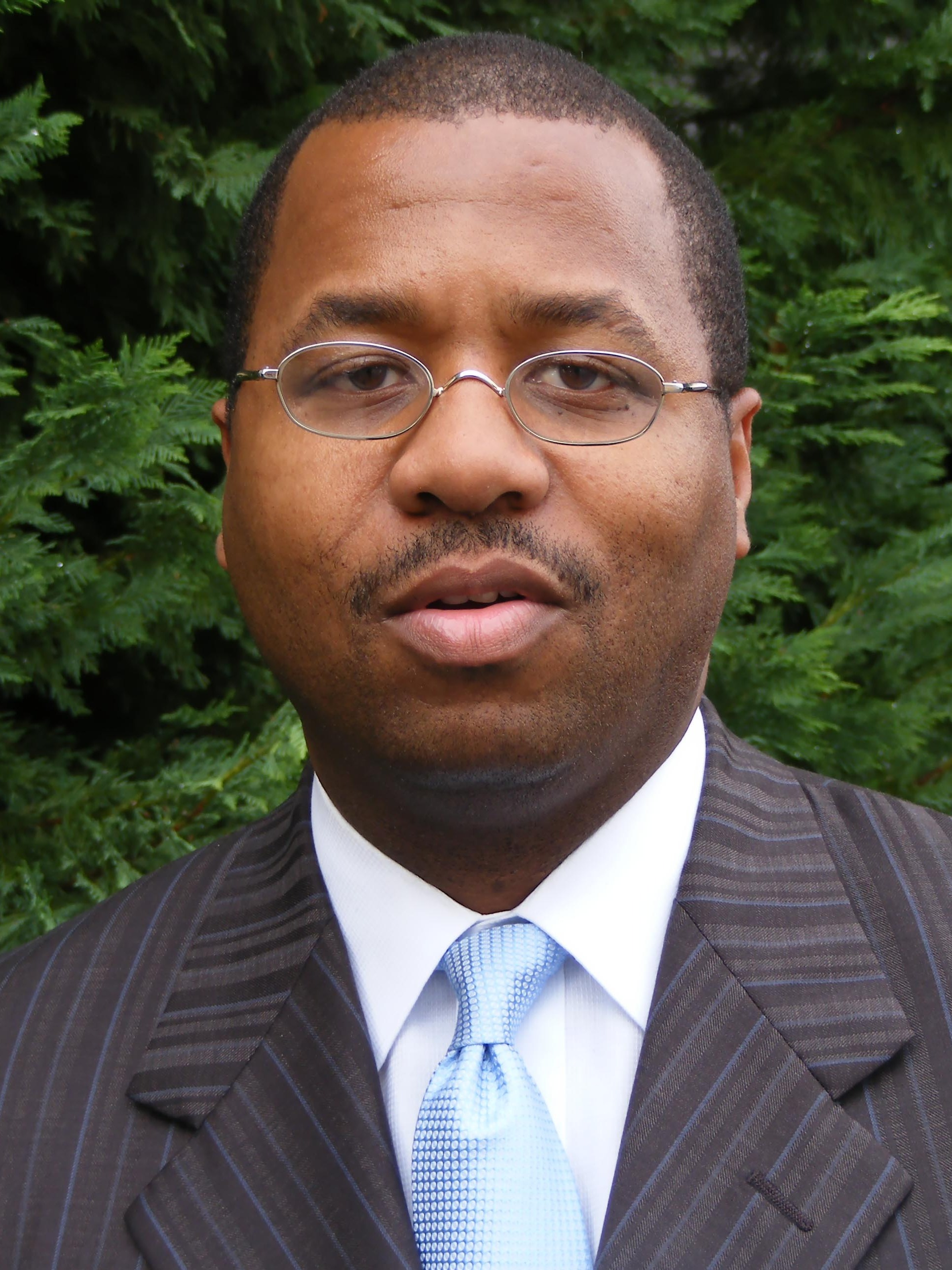
- Harris in 2007

Member of the Baltimore City Council from the 4th district
- In office 1999–2007
- Preceded by: (new district)
- Succeeded by: William Henry
- Constituency: Northeast Baltimore

Personal details
- Born: Kenneth N. Harris Sr. July 17, 1963 Baltimore, Maryland
- Died: September 20, 2008 (aged 45) Baltimore, Maryland
- Party: Democratic
- Spouse: Annette
- Children: 2

Kenneth N. Harris Sr. (July 17, 1963 – September 20, 2008), a member of the Democratic Party, was a candidate for Baltimore City Council President. He served on the city council since 1999, representing Baltimore's 4th Council District, until 2007. On September 20, 2008, Harris was shot and killed outside of a jazz club in northeast Baltimore.

== Education and early career ==
Ken Harris was born to Sylvia Harris, a single teenage mother in the Park Heights neighborhood of Baltimore City. Growing up in a rough area, Ken saw first hand what a crime-ridden community looked like. He put all of his energy into school, learning at an early age that he didn't want to wind up in gangs or worse. Harris graduated from Dunbar Senior High School and was MVP of their baseball team in 1981. Although Harris had been drafted by the Pittsburgh Pirates, he enrolled at Morgan State University to further his education. On August 25, 1985, Harris married the former Annette Barnes and from this union, Nicole and Kenneth Jr. were born.

After completing a B.S. in Business Administration at Morgan in 1989, Harris first worked for Care First Blue Cross/Blue Shield. In 1997 he was hired as director of membership and business services for the Downtown Partnership of Baltimore and a few years later he was hired as an executive at Comcast. Harris served as President of the Leith Walk Elementary School PTA and coached in the Northwood Baseball League.

== Baltimore City Council ==
Harris was elected to the Baltimore City Council in 1999. He represented the fourth district, located in North-Central Baltimore. In addition to his committee responsibilities, Harris was a frequent speaker at City Schools, delivering motivational speeches focused on what young people need to succeed. Harris established the "Bridge to Manhood" in 2005, a program that sends successful African-American men into City Schools to talk with boys about overcoming the odds. He was a leader on the council to combat secondhand smoke through a citywide smoking ban.

Harris chaired the Education, Housing, Health, and Human Services Committee, was a member of the Land Use and Transportation Committee, and chaired the Highways and Franchise Subcommittee.

== City Council President's race ==
Harris launched a campaign for President of the Baltimore City Council on January 29, 2007. Harris was endorsed by United States Senator Ben Cardin, Baltimore City delegation chairman Curt Anderson and the Baltimore Afro American newspaper. Harris' campaign failed to gain traction, and he ultimately won 11 percent of the vote in the Democratic primary, far behind Michael Sarbanes and incumbent and ultimate winner Stephanie Rawlings Blake.

== Death ==
On September 20, 2008, at approximately 1:45 a.m., Harris was shot outside of the New Haven Lounge in northeast Baltimore City. Four men, with their faces covered and at least one of them armed with a hand gun, surprised Harris and the club's owner during an apparent robbery attempt at the club's front entrance. Harris was chased to his car by one of the men when the assailant shot through the window of Harris' Toyota, striking him in the chest. The men then robbed the club and fled out a back door leading to an alley behind the shopping center. Harris was taken to Johns Hopkins Hospital where he was pronounced dead shortly after 2:00 am.

On November 14, 2008, Baltimore City police announced the arrest of two suspects in the case. Ultimately, three individuals would stand trial: 22-year-old Charles Y. McGaney and 17-year-old Jerome Williams were convicted in Baltimore City Circuit and sentenced to life plus 30 years. 22-year-old Gary A. Collins was convicted of the robbery of club patrons, but not the murder of Harris.

More than 1,500 people, including Governor Martin O'Malley, former Governor Robert Ehrlich, Senator Ben Cardin and Congressman Dutch Ruppersberger, attended his funeral at the Murphy Fine Arts Building on the campus of Morgan State University. All state of Maryland flags were flown at half-staff on the day of his funeral.
