= Ann Marie Doory =

American politician

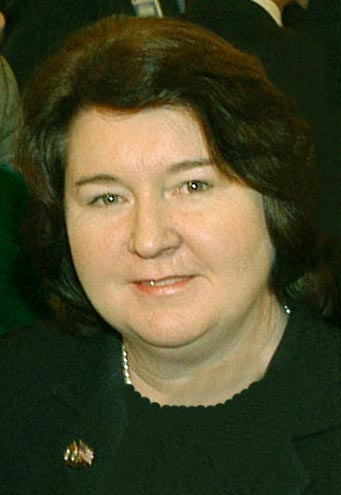

Member of the Maryland House of Delegates from the 43rd district
- In office January 14, 1987 – July 13, 2010 Serving with Gerald Curran (D), Henry R. Hergenroeder, Jr. (D)
- Preceded by: C. Bucky Muth (D)
- Succeeded by: Scherod C. Barnes
- Constituency: Baltimore, Maryland, U.S.

Personal details
- Born: Ann Marie Lowe; August 19, 1954 (age 72) Yonkers, New York, U.S.
- Party: Democratic
- Spouse: Robert
- Relations: Tim Doory, Judge, Baltimore Circuit Court (retired)
- Children: 2
- Education: St. Mary's Academy; Towson State University (BA); University of Baltimore School of Law (JD)
- Profession: Attorney, realtor
- Website: Official website

Ann Marie L. Doory is an American politician who represented the 43rd legislative district in the Maryland House of Delegates from 1987 to 2010. She resigned on July 13, 2010.

== Background ==
Doory was born in Yonkers, New York, on August 19, 1954. She attended St. Mary's Academy in Leonardtown, Maryland, graduating in 1972. She majored in political science at Towson State University, earning her B.A. in 1976. Three years later, she graduated from the University of Baltimore School of Law, earning a Juris Doctor in 1979. As an attorney, she is a member of the Maryland State and Women's Bar Associations.

Prior to running for office, she served as counsel to the Majority Leader of the Maryland State Senate (1981) and was elected to the Maryland Democratic State Central Committee from Baltimore in 1982, serving until her successful run for the Maryland House of Delegates in 1986. In the 2006 campaign, Doory joined with 43rd district incumbents Senator Joan Carter Conway, and Delegates Maggie McIntosh and Curt Anderson to defeat a field of six other challengers. The team knocked on more than 20,000 doors, mailed nearly 100,000 thousand pieces of literature and defeated all challengers in both the primary and general elections.

== Legislative career ==
In the House of Delegates, Doory serves as vice-chairman of the Ways and Means Committee and a member of the Rules and Executive Nominations Committee. Doory was also a member of the Article 27 (crimes & punishments) Revision Committee, the Joint Committee on Investigation and Deputy Speaker Pro Tem from 1999 to 2003. Earlier in her legislative career she was the House Parliamentarian from 1993 to 1994 and chairman of the Women Legislators of Maryland from 2001 to 2002. She was the lead sponsor of a bill ensuring a 48-hour hospital stay for mothers and newborns after birth, the first law of its kind in the country and lead Sponsor of a bill to require the development of child resistant handgun technology, which ultimately led to the Gun Safety Act of 2000.

== Personal life ==
Doory is a board member of the Homeland Association Citizens on Patrol, the House of Ruth, the Central Maryland Council of Girl Scouts and the Good Samaritan Hospital. She is married to Robert Doory and has two children Elizabeth (Beth) and Brian and two grandchildren, Grace (11) and Alden (9).

== Legislative notes ==
=== 2008 ===
- Primary sponsor the Flexible Leave Act of 2008 (HB40)

=== 2007 ===
- Voted for the Clean Indoor Air Act of 2007 (HB359)
- Voted in favor the Tax Reform Act of 2007(HB2)
- Voted in favor of prohibiting ground rents in 2007(SB106)
- Voted in favor of Higher Education -Tuition Charges-Maryland High School Students in 2007 (HB6)
- Voted in favor of Slots (HB4) in the 2007 Special session

=== 2006 ===
- Voted for the Healthy Air Act in 2006 (SB154)

=== 2005 ===
- Voted against slots in 2005 (HB1361)
- Primary sponsor, Program Open Space Funds (HB415)

=== 1998 ===
- Voted for income tax reduction in 1998 (SB750)

== Election results ==
- 2006 Race for Maryland House of Delegates – 43rd District

Voters to choose three:

Name	Votes	Percent	Outcome
Curt Anderson, Democratic	22,315	29.4%	Won
Maggie McIntosh, Democratic	22,093	29.1%	Won
Ann Marie Doory, Democratic	21,219	28.0%	Won
Armand F. Girard, Republican	3,425	4.5%	Lost
David G.S. Greene, Green	2,619	3.5%	Lost
Brandy Baker, Green	2,267	3.0%	Lost
Richard J. Ochs, Green	1,772	2.3%	Lost

- 2002 Race for Maryland House of Delegates – 43rd District

Voters to choose three:

Name	Votes	Percent	Outcome
Maggie McIntosh, Democratic	21,993	32.5%	Won
Curt Anderson, Democratic	21,131	30.8%	Won
Ann Marie Doory, Democratic	19,999	29.15%	Won
John A. Heath, Republican	5,243	7.64%	Lost
Morning Sunday, Green(Write-In)	152	.22%	Lost
Other Write-Ins	97	.14%	Lost
