= Curt Anderson =

American politician, lawyer and former broadcast journalist

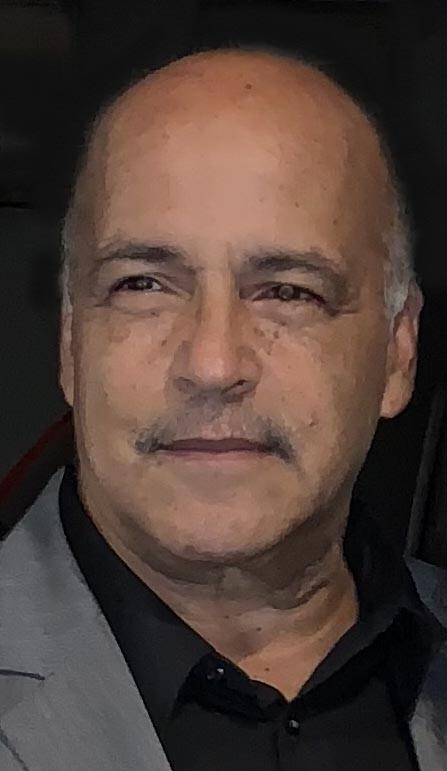

Member of the Maryland House of Delegates from the 43rd district
- In office January 8, 2003 – January 11, 2023
- Preceded by: Ken Montague, Michael Dobson
- Succeeded by: Redistricting
- Constituency: Baltimore, Maryland

Member of the Maryland House of Delegates from the 44th district
- In office January 12, 1983 – January 10, 1995
- Preceded by: Torey Brown, Frank Robey
- Succeeded by: Ann Marie Doory

Personal details
- Born: Curtis Stovall Anderson; October 12, 1949 (age 76) Chicago, Illinois, U.S.
- Party: Democratic
- Spouse: Divorced
- Relations: Shani Davis (cousin)
- Children: Ambre Anderson, Curtis Ian, Damien, Christian
- Occupation: Attorney

Curtis Stovall Anderson (born October 12, 1949) is an American politician, lawyer and former broadcast journalist. He was first elected to the Maryland House of Delegates in 1983, was the chairman of the Baltimore City Delegation, and past chairman of the Legislative Black Caucus of Maryland. After serving 12 years, he was elected again in 2002, and served until his retirement in 2023. He was a delegate to the Democratic National Convention in 1992 (Clinton) and 2008 (Obama).

== Background ==
Anderson was born on October 12, 1949, to Leonard and Jean Anderson in Chicago, Illinois. His father, a graduate of Morgan State University, moved the family to Baltimore in 1952 to take a job as Dean at Morgan State University and assistant rector at the St. James' Episcopal Church. Anderson's parents divorced in 1957, and he and his two sisters were raised by his mother.

=== Education ===
Anderson attended primary schools in Baltimore and Glencoe, Illinois. In 1964, he entered the Baltimore City College. He was the captain of the football and track teams and won a scholarship to Rutgers University. Anderson majored in political science and made the freshman and varsity football and freshman track teams. But in the fall of 1969, Anderson left Rutgers at the end of the semester. In 1973, he entered Morgan State College where he earned a bachelor's degree in political science. He also played on the legendary "Ten Bears" lacrosse team, the only black college lacrosse team in America. In 1982, after his television career, he entered the University of Baltimore Law School from which earned a Juris Doctor degree.

== Professional career ==
=== Broadcast journalist ===
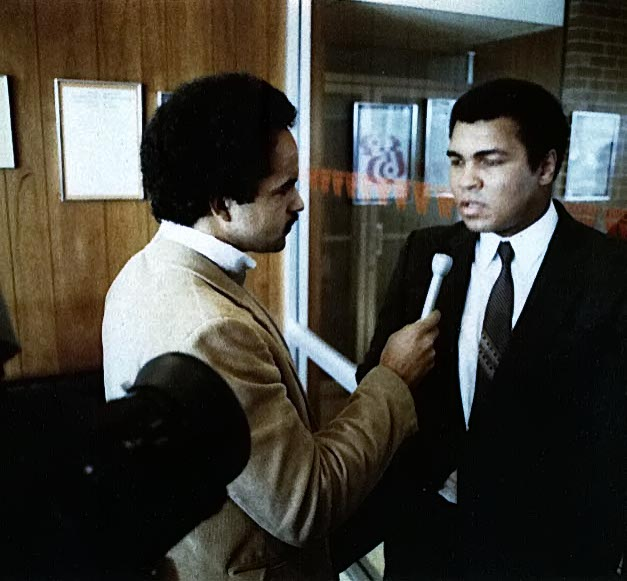
Anderson interviews Ali, 1978

Prior to running for the House of Delegates, Anderson anchored the news at channel 2, WMAR-TV, and channel 11, WBAL-TV, in Baltimore, Maryland. Anderson was first hired by WBAL in 1976 as a reporter where he regularly covered the state legislature, Baltimore City Hall, produced features and even boxed a round with Muhammad Ali as a feature story in 1978.

In 1980, Anderson was hired by WMAR-TV to be the station's weekend anchor and reporter. He covered events such as the Wayne Williams trial in Atlanta and the Cuban refugee influx in Pennsylvania. In April 1982, Anderson was let go by WMAR-TV following a 90-day labor strike.

Though he interviewed for jobs at WSB-TV in Atlanta and WBZ-TV in Boston, Anderson chose not to move his family and remained in Baltimore. He ran for the Maryland House of Delegates while entering law school.

=== Law ===
Anderson graduated from the University of Baltimore School of Law in 1987 and passed the Maryland Bar Exam in 1988. He joined the law firm of Murphy and Associates as a criminal defense attorney that same year. He opened his own practice in 1996 and has represented thousands of individuals in the Circuit and District courts in Baltimore City and 16 of Maryland's 23 counties as well as arguing a case before the Supreme Court of Maryland

== Legislative career ==
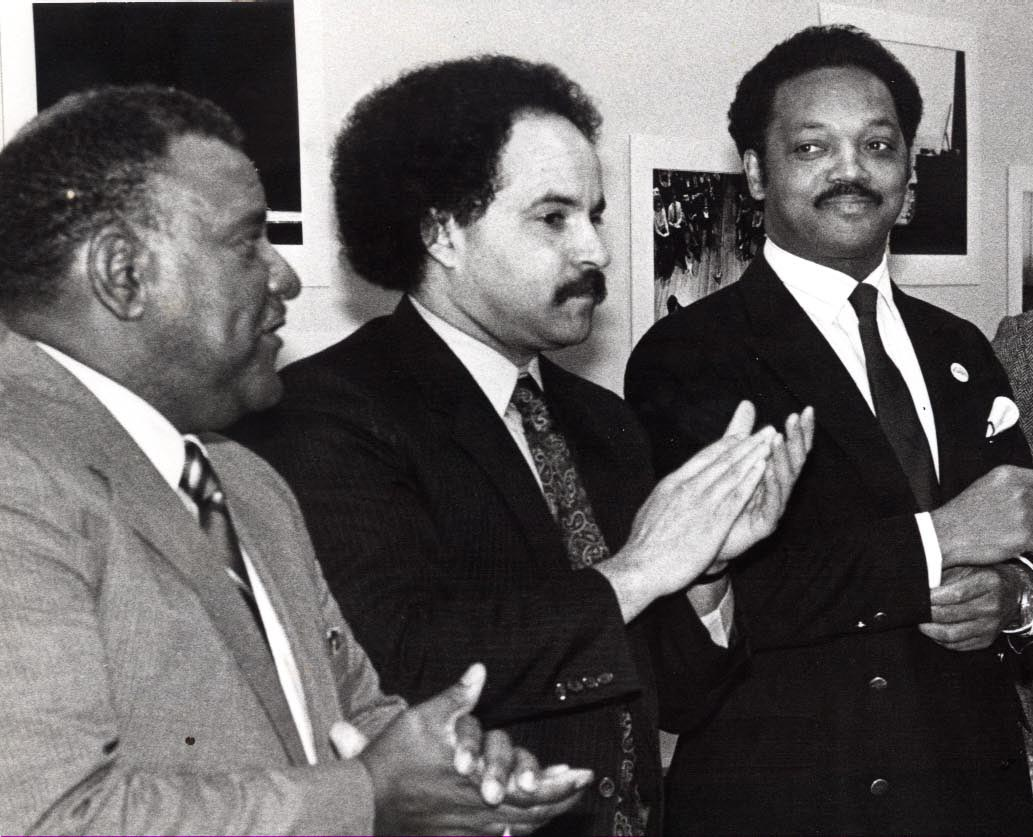
Anderson (center) with Jesse Jackson (right) and Sen. Decatur Trotter (left) during a Maryland Legislative Black Caucus meeting in Annapolis, Maryland (1988)

In 1982, Anderson won a seat in the House of Delegates, finishing first in a crowded field of candidates which included four incumbents. He was sworn in January 1983 and assigned to the House Ways and Means committee.

After serving five years in the Maryland General Assembly, Anderson was elected chairman of the Legislative Black Caucus of Maryland. As chairman he sponsored and saw the passage of Maryland's Minority Business Enterprise Act. One of the benefits of this act for minority business was increased participation in major state projects like the building of Oriole Park at Camden Yards. Nearly 20% of the contracts let for the construction of the new ballpark went to minority-owned businesses.

In 1993, Anderson was appointed to the Baltimore Orioles All-Star Game host committee; the entity that planned the activities around MLB's 1993 All-Star game to be played in Baltimore. Anderson, the only African-American on the 12 member committed persuaded the group to invite James Earl Jones to speak the pre-game National Anthem, backed up by the HBCU Morgan State University Choir. The committee had planned to invite Garth Brooks to sing the Anthem. Anderson also worked with BET to sponsor a step show competition for local black fraternities at the stadium during the week of the All Star game festivities. After 12 years in the House, Anderson ran for the Senate in 1994 but was defeated in the Democratic primary. He practiced law for the next 8 years. In 2002, he made a run for the House of Delegates. As before he was a non-incumbent running against four incumbents for three seats. Unlike his first race in 1982 where he beat all the incumbents and finished first, this time Anderson finished third with a razor-thin 100-vote margin of victory over 4th-place finisher incumbent Ken Montague. In the 2006 general election campaign, Anderson joined with 43rd district incumbents, including Senator Joan Carter Conway, Delegate Maggie McIntosh and Delegate Ann Marie Doory to defeat a field of 6 other challengers.

In 2018, the Baltimore Sun reported that Delegate Anderson was under investigation from the Ethics Committee of the General Assembly for sexual assault and sexual harassment. Delegate Anderson was still re-elected but by a very small margin in the Democratic Primary. After the election, under pressure from constituents, the Ethics Committee issued its findings and insisted that Delegate Anderson undergo intensive one-on-one sexual harassment training. Speaker Busch of the House stripped Delegate Anderson of his leadership roles. Anderson won re-election in both the primary and general elections.

In May 2020, new Maryland House of Delegates speaker Adrienne A. Jones appointed Anderson to a special work group on police accountability which made major changes to Maryland's Law Enforcement Officers' Bill of Rights.

=== Slots ===
Since 2003, Anderson has been known for his opposition to the introduction of slot machines in Annapolis. Delegate Anderson organized protests against slots, wrote newspaper editorials and took to the airwaves at several local radio and television stations to solidify opposition to bringing organized gambling into Maryland. In spite of strong support for slots by then Maryland Governor Robert Ehrlich, Anderson and his colleagues prevailed and a pro-slots bill never made it out of the House of Delegates though similar bills had passed the State Senate. In 2005, however, both chambers passed different pro-slots bills. In the House of Delegates the measure passed by a 71–66 vote. In 2007 new Governor, Martin O'Malley, hinted at some marginal support for slots as a possible new revenue source. Although Anderson and O'Malley share party affiliations, Anderson remained a staunch opponent of bringing slots into Maryland.

=== Crime ===
Anderson chairs of the House Judiciary's subcommittee on criminal justice, served on the House of Delegates' Special Committee on Drug and Alcohol and chairs the Legislative Black Caucus of Maryland's committee on crime and justice. In 2003, Anderson was appointed to and currently serves on the Maryland State Commission on Criminal Sentencing Policy. In the 2007 session of the Maryland General Assembly, introduced measures to increase drug treatment funding while requiring the state's courts to refer first time misdemeanor drug users to treatment. The initiative mirrors those adopted on the west coast under California Proposition 36. Anderson's other bill in the drug area represents a major change in Maryland drug policy, HB992, would have repealed the state's without parole provisions from the sentences of second time non-violent drug felons. Referencing the fact that nearly 90% of those incarcerated in Maryland for drug felonies are of African-American descent, Anderson has sought to create a racially equitable solution to the drug problem. The Maryland State Commission of Sentencing Guidelines is also considering changing sentencing guidelines for low level felony drug offenders. Additionally, Anderson was the House of Delegates floor leader on legislation that would automatically expunge the records of the thousands individuals who have been arrested in Baltimore City without being charged with a crime. In 2006 more than 21,000 people, mostly African-Americans, were arrested in Baltimore City and then released hours later without being charged with a crime. Existing Maryland law would allow them to have their records expunged of these arrests but not without signing a written waiver of rights or waiting for three years. HB-10 would make the expungement automatic with no waiver, no fee and no waiting period. It passed the Maryland House of Delegates on March 7, 2007, by a vote of 130- and signed into law in April 2007.

=== Legislative notes ===
1989

Anderson was the primary sponsor of HB 1303-Vehicle Laws-Towing or removal from parking lots-Baltimore City, Baltimore County.(Chapter 462 of Laws enacted during the 1989 legislature) The bill was introduced following an epidemic of cars being towed from private lots in the Baltimore region, without warning to vehicle owners. The new law required each lot be posted with warnings, the possible cost of towing and the place to where the vehicle had been towed.

1990

Following the 1989 Supreme Court decision in City of Richmond v. J.A. Croson Co. (ruling Richmond's MBE set asides unconstitutional), most states that had procurement laws for minority business (MBE) found that their laws were also unconstitutional. Anderson, then chairman of the Legislative Black Caucus of Maryland, sponsored HB 1540-Minority Business Procurement (Chapter 708 of Laws enacted during the 1990 legislature), creating a constitutional framework for MBE procurement in Maryland.

Also in 1990, Anderson was the primary and sole sponsor of HB 328 which allowed retired judges to be called back into service for up to 90 days to help alleviate crowded court dockets. (Chapter 154 of Laws enacted during the 1990 legislature)

1991

Maryland's first comprehensive DNA Profile bill was sponsored by Anderson in 1991. The bill set up state standards to be followed when DNA evidence was sought to be introduced in criminal trials in Maryland. Anderson's HB 1150 was signed into law on May 24, 1991. (Ch 631).

1992

During the 1992 session, Anderson's HB178 was signed into law. The bill required that interpreters, for non-English speaking defendants, be provided in all of Maryland's courts.

1994

In 1994, Anderson introduced a bill to raise the age after which a Maryland public school student could dropout from age 16 to age 18. The bill failed, but the Maryland General Assembly passed the same bill in 2012.

2007

Anderson also sponsored legislation that would require the state's forensic laboratories be strictly monitored. The bill, which was signed by the Governor in 2007, proposed to ensure that the scientific reliability of forensic testimony could not be challenged due to a lack of appropriate standards and basic protocols. (became law Chapter 147) That same year he was also the primary sponsor of HB 1071, creating child fatality review teams for the prevention of child deaths (became law Chapter 264)

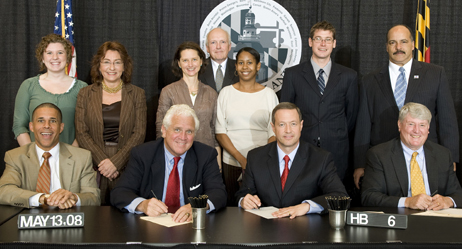
Governor O'Malley, flanked by Speaker Busch and President Miller signs House Bill 6(2008) into law.

2008

During the 2008 legislative session Anderson sponsored the Custodial Interrogation Act which requires law enforcement officers to electronically record interrogations in murder and rape cases that resulted in confessions. The bill was signed into law by the Governor in May 2008.

2009

In the 2009 session, Anderson introduced two bills aimed at strengthening Maryland's drunk driving laws: HB330 (Manslaughter and Vehicular Manslaughter -Penalties) and HB 212 (Preliminary Breath Test – Evidence). Anderson was the primary sponsor of HB66, revamping and updating Maryland's theft statute (Chapter 655). he also sponsored several gun bills designed to decrease violent crime in Baltimore.

2010

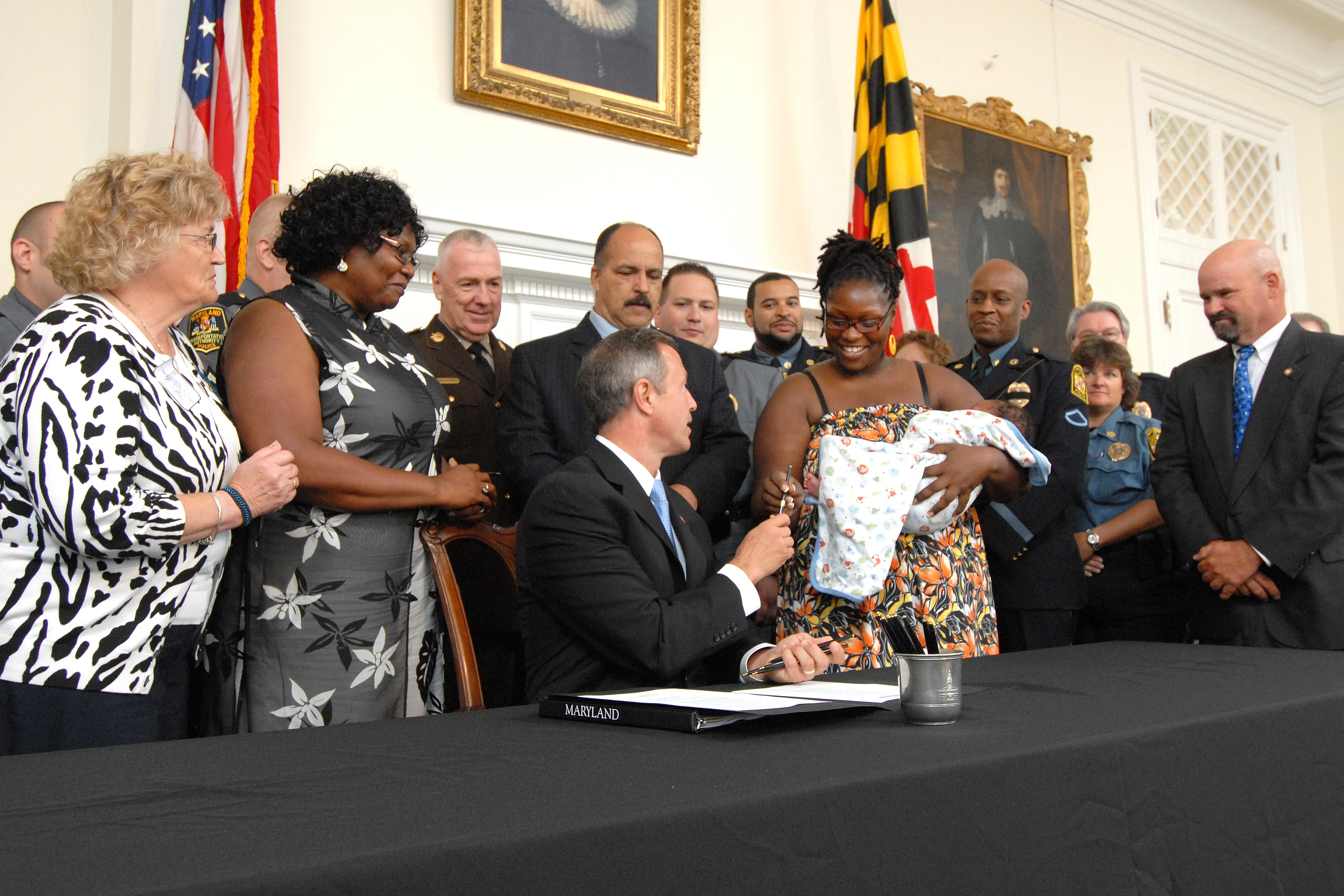
Governor O'Malley signs the BLUE Alert executive order, June 2010

Anderson was the primary and sole sponsor of House Bill 1473 – Maryland's "BLUE Alert" system. A system similar to that of the Amber alert but is activated when police officer has been killed or seriously wounded and the offender is still at large. Anderson's BLUE alert bill passed the House of Delegates with a 138–0 and passed the through the Maryland Senate with a 46–0 vote. Governor O'Malley signed the bill into law in May 2010, but then moved up its effective date by signing an executive order implementing the BLUE Alert system on June 22, 2010.

2011

During the 2011 legislative session, Anderson was the sponsor of House Bill 241. Aimed at public safety, this bill added shotguns and rifles to the list of weapons for which a mandatory sentence is required. The bill also increased the sentencing to 15 years in prison. Anderson's House Bill 302, which also became law in 2011, changed Maryland's practice of parole approval. Maryland was one of the few states that left parole decisions, in life sentence cases, up to the Governor. Anderson's bill shifted those decisions to the parole board if the governor did not act on parole board recommendations.

2012

As chairman of the Baltimore City Delegation, Anderson was responsible for the Delegation's most important bill of the year- HB 860 (Baltimore City Public Schools Construction and Revitalization Act of 2013). Signed by the Governor on May 16, 2013, the new law approved 1.1 billion dollars to construct new schools in Baltimore City.

2015

Anderson was the primary sponsor of the Second Chance Act. Signed into law by Governor Hogan in May 2015, The new law will allow people with certain misdemeanor convictions have those convictions shielded from public view. Anderson was also the primary sponsor of a bill that repealed some of Maryland's mandatory minimum sentences for drug related felonies. The governor neither signed nor vetoed the bill, it was allowed to become law.

== Task force, boards and commissions ==
- 2020, Appointed by the Speaker of the House of Delegates to its Work Group to Address Police Reform and Accountability in Maryland
- 2016–2019, Maryland Police Training and Standards Commission
- 2015, Appointed by the Speaker of the House of Delegates to chair a task force on public safety and Police practices.
- 2014–2015, Appointed by Baltimore Mayor Stephanie Rawlings Blake to study the issue of body cameras on Baltimore police officers.
- 2012–2014, Anderson was appointed by the Maryland House Speaker to a task force to study the impact of a Maryland Court of Appeals ruling regarding "Representation of indigent criminal defendants by the office of the public defender."
- 2012–2014, Anderson was appointed by Maryland legislative leaders to chair a task force to study the impact of a Maryland Court of Appeals ruling regarding the liability of owners of pit bulls and landlords that rent to them.
- 2009–2016, Baltimore Convention and Tourism Board
- 2003–2019, Anderson was appointed by the Governor of Maryland to serve on the Maryland State Commission on Criminal Sentencing Policy.
- 2000–2010, Board of Directors, Northwood Baseball League (Baltimore), (Chairman-1999-2001)
- 1989–1995, Governor's Commission on Maryland Military Monuments
- 1987–1990, Appointed by the Speaker of the Maryland House of Delegates to its Special Committee on Drug and Alcohol Abuse
- 1978–1982, Board of Trustees, Provident Hospital, Baltimore, Maryland

== Past general election results ==
Results

2014 Race for Maryland House of Delegates – 43rd District; voters to choose three
Name	Votes	Percent	Outcome
Curt Anderson, Democratic	23,046	34.1%	Won
Maggie McIntosh, Democratic	22,310	33.0%	Won
Mary L. Washington, Democratic	21,800	32.3%	Won
no Republican filed			
Other Write-Ins	267	0.4%	Lost
Greg Dorsey (Write-In)	128	0.2%	Lost

2010 Race for Maryland House of Delegates – 43rd District; voters to choose three
Name	Votes	Percent	Outcome
Curt Anderson, Democratic	24,831	35.1%	Won
Maggie McIntosh, Democratic	23,266	32.8%	Won
Mary L. Washington, Democratic	22,334	31.5%	Won
no Republican filed			

2006 Race for Maryland House of Delegates – 43rd District; voters to choose three
Name	Votes	Percent	Outcome
Curt Anderson, Democratic	22,315	29.4%	Won
Maggie McIntosh, Democratic	22,093	29.1%	Won
Ann Marie Doory, Democratic	21,219	28.0%	Won
Armand F. Girard, Republican	3,425	4.5%	Lost
David G.S. Greene, Green	2,619	3.5%	Lost
Brandy Baker, Green	2,267	3.0%	Lost
Richard J. Ochs, Green	1,772	2.3%	Lost

2002 Race for Maryland House of Delegates – 43rd District; voters to choose three
Name	Votes	Percent	Outcome
Maggie McIntosh, Democratic	21,993	32.50%	Won
Curt Anderson, Democratic	21,131	30.80%	Won
Ann Marie Doory, Democratic	19,999	29.15%	Won
John A. Heath, Republican	5,243	7.64%	Lost
Morning Sunday, Green (Write-In)	152	0.22%	Lost
Other Write-Ins	97	0.14%	Lost

1990 Race for Maryland House of Delegates – 44th District; voters to choose three
Name	Votes	Percent	Outcome
Curt Anderson, Democratic	10,950	31%	Won
Anne Perkins, Democratic	10,881	30%	Won
Kenneth Montague, Democratic	10,536	29%	Won
Duane Frazier, Republican	3,180	8%	Lost

1986 Race for Maryland House of Delegates – 44th District; voters to choose three
Name	Votes	Percent	Outcome
Curt Anderson, Democratic	14,016	30%	Won
Anne Perkins, Democratic	14,713	32%	Won
Kenneth Montague, Democratic	13,866	29%	Won
James B. Larrimore, Republican	3,468	8%	Lost

1982 Race for Maryland House of Delegates – 44th District; voters to choose three
Name	Votes	Percent	Outcome
Curt Anderson, Democratic	17,692	30.4%	Won
Anne S. Perkins, Democratic	16,765	29.5%	Won
Dennis C. McCoy, Democratic	16,687	29.0%	Won
A. Hairston, Republican	2,528	4.4%	Lost
Benjamin Jones, Republican	2,390	3.9%	Lost
Armstead Jones, Republican	2,281	3.3%	Lost

== Awards ==
- 2008, Legislator of the Year - Office of the Maryland Public Defender
- 2009, Humanitarian of the Year - Mayland Restorative Justice Initiative
- 2010, Most Influential Maryland Legislators (Top 20)
- 2010, Legislator of the Year - Maryland Fraternal Order of Police, Maryland Chapter Concerns of Police Survivors
- 2011, Alumnus of the Year (shared) - Baltimore City College
- 2013, Inducted into the Baltimore City College Hall of Fame
