= Henry Kulp Ober =

American college president and bishop

Henry Kulp Ober (1878 – March 12, 1939) was an American college president and bishop. He was a President of Elizabethtown College.

Ober served as president from 1918 until 1921, when he left to study at Franklin and Marshall College. He returned as president in 1924 and served until January 1928.

Ober Residence hall on the Elizabethtown College campus is named in his honor.

Preceded by Daniel Conrad Reber	President of Elizabethtown College; 1918 - 1921	Succeeded by Jacob Gibble Meyer
Preceded by Jacob Gibble Meyer	President of Elizabethtown College; 1924 - 1928	Succeeded by Ralph Weist Schlosser
