= Wesley McDonald =

Wesley McDonald may refer to:

- Wesley L. McDonald (1924–2009), U.S. Navy officer
- W. Wesley McDonald (1946–2014), American academic
- Wes McDonald (born 1997), English footballer for Morecambe
