= Cecilia McCormick =

President of the Maryland Institute College of Art
- Incumbent
- Assumed office January 2024 (acting until June 2024)
- Preceded by: Samuel Hoi

15th President of Elizabethtown College
- In office July 1, 2019 – December 31, 2021
- Preceded by: Carl J. Strikwerda

Personal details
- Education: Saint Joseph's University; Widener University Delaware Law School; Harvard Graduate School of Education
- Occupation: Academic administrator; lawyer

Cecilia McCormick is a U.S. academic administrator and lawyer serving as president of the Maryland Institute College of Art since 2024. She was the 15th president of Elizabethtown College from 2019 to 2021.

== Life ==
McCormick is from Ocean City, New Jersey. She earned a bachelor's degree in management and marketing from Saint Joseph's University. She completed a paralegal certificate at Widener University and a J.D. from Widener University Delaware Law School. She completed post-doctoral studies at the Institute for Educational Management at the Harvard Graduate School of Education.

McCormick worked at PECO Energy Company and The Vanguard Group's retirement center. She was a lawyer in the Philadelphia area for ten years. She held administrative roles at Johns Hopkins University. McCormick was dean and director of the Legal Education Institute for the Widener University Delaware Law School. At Thomas Jefferson University, as the vice provost for academic strategy and special programs, she assisted with its merger with Philadelphia University.

On July 1, 2019, McCormick became the 15th president of Elizabethtown College. Succeeding Carl J. Strikwerda, she became its first female president. She resigned on December 31, 2021. In January 2024, McCormick became interim president of Maryland Institute College of Art following Samuel Hoi's retirement. She permanently assumed the role in June that year.

McCormick is married with three sons.
