= Charles Abba Baugher =

American academic and college president

- Born: September 9, 1893
- Died: November 2, 1962 (aged 69)
- Occupation: President of Elizabethtown College (1941-1961)
- Predecessor: Ralph Weist Schlosser
- Successor: Roy Edwin McAuley

Charles Abba Baugher (September 9, 1893 – November 2, 1962) was an American academic, a former professor and President of Elizabethtown College.

Baugher became President of Elizabethtown College in 1941 and served until 1961.

The Baugher Student Center on Elizabethtown College's campus is named after him.
