= Donald F. Durnbaugh =

American historian (1927–2005)

Donald F. Durnbaugh (1927–2005) was a noted historian of the Church of the Brethren who published more than 200 books, articles, reviews, and essays on its history. In the words of Dale Brown, with whom he taught at Bethany Theological Seminary, Durnbaugh was "the dean of Brethren historians." He was also considered a leading authority on other Anabaptist religious movements.

== Educator and church leader ==
Born in 1927, Durnbaugh earned a bachelor's degree in history from Manchester College in North Manchester, Indiana, in 1949. Following graduation, he engaged in volunteer service in Europe through the Brethren Service Commission, working with refugees in Austria, where he later returned to direct the Brethren Service program (1953–1956). Durnbaugh went on to earn a master's degree in history from the University of Michigan in 1952 and a doctorate in history from the University of Pennsylvania in 1960.

Durnbaugh taught at Juniata College in Huntingdon, Pennsylvania from 1958 until he went to Bethany Theological Seminary in 1962 to teach church history. In 1986, he served in the highest elected position in the Church of the Brethren as Annual Conference moderator. The Church of the Brethren is a Christian denomination of the Anabaptist and Pietist traditions that is committed to living out its faith peacefully, simply, and in community.

In 1988, Durnbaugh became the J. Omar Good Distinguished Visiting Professor at Juniata and, in 1989, the Carl W. Ziegler Professor of History and Religion at Elizabethtown College in Elizabethtown, Pennsylvania. His many professional associations included affiliation with the Young Center for the Study of Anabaptist and Pietist Studies at Elizabethtown College and service as President of the Brethren Journal Association.

He organized the first Brethren World Assembly in 1992. They met at Elizabethtown College in Pennsylvania and celebrated the 250th anniversary of the first known Brethren Annual Meeting in 1742. The assembly meets every five years.

The 2023 Brethren World Assembly celebrated the 100th anniversary of the founding of the ministry in Nigeria; the assembly included nine branches of the denominations, Grace Brethren, Covenant Brethren Church, Church of the Brethren, Conservative Grace Brethren Churches International, the Dunkard Brethren Church, the Brethren Church and three different groups of the Old German Baptist Brethren.

He was awarded an honorary doctorate by Juniata College in 2003.

== Scholarship ==
Among his numerous books and articles are:

- "European Origins of the Brethren: A Source Book on the Beginnings of the Church of the Brethren in Early Eighteenth-Century Europe" (Brethren Press, 1958)
- "Brethren in Colonial America: A Source Book on the Transplantation and Development of the Church of the Brethren in the Eighteenth Century" (Brethren Press, 1967)
- "The Believers' Church: The History and Character of Radical Protestantism" (Macmillan, 1968)
- "Every Need Supplied: Mutual Aid and Christian Community in the Free Churches, 1525–1675" (Temple University Press, 1974)
- "The Brethren Encyclopedia, Volumes I–III (Ed.) (Brethren Encyclopedia, Inc., 1983)
- "Meet the Brethren" (Ed.) (Brethren Press, 1984)
- "Pragmatic Prophet: The Life of Michael Robert Zigler" (Brethren Press, 1989)
- "Fruit of the Vine: A History of the Brethren, 1708–1995" (Brethren Press, 1997)

At the time of his death in 2005, he was in the process of editing Volume IV of the Brethren Encyclopedia, with co-editor Dale Ulrich and contributing editor Carl Bowman. Published in 2006, this volume included new information on the Brethren from 1980 to 1995, a comprehensive index covering all four volumes, and additions and corrections to the first 3 volumes.

== Death and funeral ==
Durnbaugh died on Saturday, August 27, 2005 at Beth Israel Hospital in Newark, N.J., while returning from a trip to Europe. His memorial service was held on September 25, 2005 at Stone Church of the Brethren in Huntingdon, Pennsylvania.

He was survived by his wife Hedwig and their children, Paul, Christopher and Renate.
