= Carl Bowman =

American sociologist (born 1957)

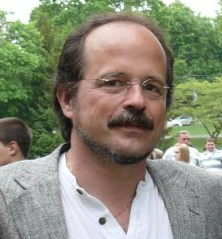
Carl Bowman, 2008

Carl Bowman (born 1957) is an American sociologist, who is widely recognized for his studies of Anabaptist religious groups and is perhaps the foremost expert on the social and cultural history of the Church of the Brethren.

== Author and educator ==
The author of various books, chapters, and monographs, Carl Bowman is perhaps best known as the author of "Brethren Society: The Cultural Transformation of a Peculiar People" (1995). His analysis of Brethren history was characterized by Donald F. Durnbaugh, preeminent Brethren historian, as one that would "shape the interpretation of Brethren history for many decades." Bowman conducted the 1985 Brethren Profile Study, the first nationally representative survey of Brethren during the twentieth century, and served for many years as Contributing Editor to "The Brethren Encyclopedia, Volume IV" (2005).

On the broader topic of Anabaptist religious groups, Bowman co-authored "On the Backroad to Heaven: Old Order Hutterites, Mennonites, Amish, and Brethren" (2001) with Donald Kraybill. He was a Research Fellow at Elizabethtown College's Young Center for Anabaptist and Pietist Studies and directed the Brethren Member Profile 2006, the second nationally representative survey of Brethren in the United States.

Bowman was Chair of the Department of Sociology at Bridgewater College in Bridgewater, Virginia, from 1988 until 2007. He has served as Director of Survey Research for the University of Virginia's Institute for Advanced Studies in Culture since 1995. Bowman has designed social surveys on political and moral culture that were fielded by the Gallup Organization and was a statistical software consultant for SYSTAT Software.

== Family background ==
Born in 1957, the second of four children born to Fred M. Bowman, a minister in the Church of the Brethren, and Wanda Martin Bowman, an elementary school teacher, Bowman moved with his family to the Shenandoah Valley of Virginia at the age of five. Except for short periods in Pennsylvania, Wisconsin, and Spain, he has lived in the shadow of the Blue Ridge Mountains for most of his life. He is married to Laura Desportes and is a parent to four children.

== Education ==
Bowman completed a B.A. in sociology from Elizabethtown College in 1979, an M.S. in sociology from the University of Wisconsin–Madison in 1981, and a Ph.D. from the University of Virginia in 1989. His dissertation, "Beyond Plainness: Cultural Transformation in the Church of the Brethren from 1850 to the Present," was completed under the direction of James Davison Hunter, author of Culture Wars: The Struggle to Define America (1991).

== Works ==
- A Profile of the Church of the Brethren, 1987. Brethren Press.
- Brethren Society: The Cultural Transformation of a Peculiar People, 1995. Johns Hopkins University Press.
- Anabaptist Currents: History in Conversation with the Present, with Stephen L. Longenecker (eds.), 1995. Penobscot Press
- The State of Disunion: 1996 Survey of American Political Culture (Vols I and II), with James Davison Hunter, 1996. In Media Res Foundation.
- The Politics of Character, with James Davison Hunter, 2000. In Media Res Foundation.
- On the Backroad to Heaven: Old Order Hutterites, Mennonites, Amish, and Brethren, with Donald B. Kraybill, 2001. Johns Hopkins University Press.
- The Brethren Encyclopedia, Volume IV (Contributing Editor), 2005. Brethren Encyclopedia, Inc.
- Portrait of a People: The Church of the Brethren at 300, 2008. Brethren Press.
