= Testerman =

Testerman is a surname. Notable people with that name include:

- Ben Testerman (born 1962), former professional tennis player from the United States
- Don Testerman (born 1952), former professional American football player who played in 4 NFL seasons
- Donna Testerman (born 1960), mathematician
- Jim Testerman, prominent labor leader in Pennsylvania, where he is president of the Pennsylvania State Education Association
- Kyle Testerman (1934-2015), mayor of Knoxville, Tennessee from 1972 to 1975, and again from 1984 to 1987
- Philip Testerman (born 1927), American politician

== See also ==
- Testerian
