= Beahm =

Beahm can refer to:

- Herschel "Guy" Beahm IV, commonly known by his online alias Dr Disrespect, an American Internet celebrity
- Darby Crash (formerly Bobby Pyn; born Jan Paul Beahm; 1958 – 1980) an American punk rock vocalist and songwriter who co-founded the punk rock band the Germs
- Isaac Newton Harvey Beahm (1859 – 1950) the President of Elizabethtown College, in Elizabethtown, Pennsylvania
