= Harry Hess Nye =

Harry Hess Nye (1887–1954) was a President of Elizabethtown College.

Nye served as president during the 1929–30 academic year while Ralph Weist Schlosser was on a sabbatical leave.

Harry Hess Nye went on to serve as Professor of History at Juniata college, 1930–1954. He was also a Presiding Elder and lay preacher in The Church of the Brethren.

Preceded by Ralph Weist Schlosser	President of Elizabethtown College; 1929 - 1930	Succeeded by Ralph Weist Schlosser
