= Theodore E. Long =

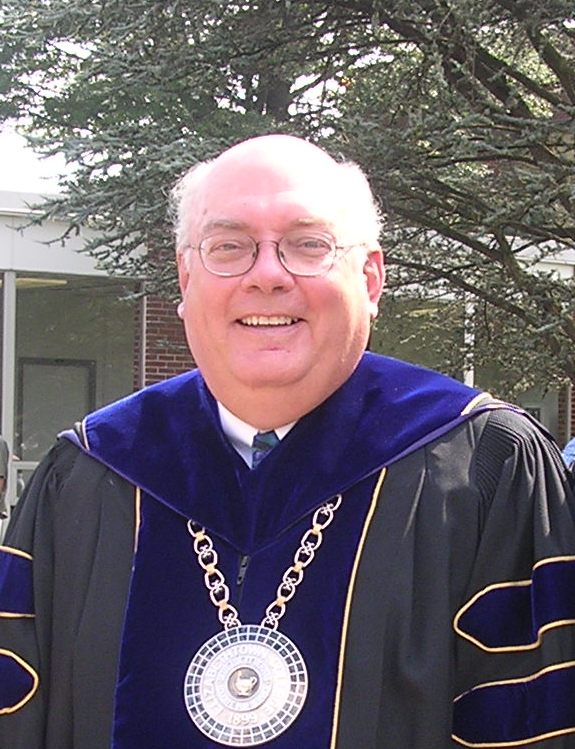
- August 2004
- Education: University of Virginia, PhD, 1979; Duke University, Masters, 1968; Capital University, 1965
- Occupation: Former president of Elizabethtown College (1996-2011)
- Predecessor: Gerhard Spiegler
- Successor: Carl J. Strikwerda

Theodore E. Long is the former president of Elizabethtown College. Long became president in 1996, and he retired in 2011. Prior to becoming president of Elizabethtown, Long served as provost and vice president for academic affairs at Merrimack College in North Andover, Massachusetts.

Long is a 1965 graduate of Capital University where he majored in sociology and philosophy. He earned a master's degree in sociology from Duke University in 1968 and doctoral degree in sociology from the University of Virginia in 1979. He specializes in sociology and philosophy.

Long is a member of the board of trustees at Capital University.

Long and his wife, Betty Long, retired to Rockland, Maine.
