= Culture Wars: The Struggle to Define America =

1991 book

- Author: James Davison Hunter
- Genre: Political Science
- Publisher: Basic Books
- Publication date: December 2, 1991
- ISBN: 9780465015337

Culture Wars: The Struggle to Define America is a book written by James Davison Hunter and published in 1991.

== Synopsis ==
It concerns the idea of a struggle to define American public life between two cultures: the progressives and the orthodox. The book illustrates its framework of historical analysis through several of the contemporary issues of the time: abortion rights, school prayer, gay rights, and more.

== Conclusion ==
Progressive and orthodox views are primarily systems of moral understanding. He identifies orthodoxy as a viewpoint through which moral truth is static, universal, and sanctioned through divine powers; contrasting progressivism, which sees moral truth as evolving and contextual. These two groups are locked in an everlasting "culture war" to assert dominion over the various institutional and systemic entities influenced by contemporary cultural praxis, most visibly the governing branches of the United States.

== Sources ==
- Grimes, Michael D. (1993). "Review". Social Science Quarterly. 74 (1): 230. JSTOR 42863186.
- Johnson, D. Paul (1992). "Review". Journal of Church and State. 34 (3): 607–608. doi:10.1093/jcs/34.3.607. JSTOR 23919465.
- Kurtz, Lester R. (1994). "Review". American Journal of Sociology. 99 (4): 1125–1128. doi:10.1086/230395. JSTOR 2781763.
- Mechling, Jay (1994). "Review". American Studies. 35 (1): 155–156. JSTOR 40642591.
