= Gerhard Spiegler =

American academic (1929–2015)

Gerhard E. Spiegler
- Born: December 4, 1929; Klaipėda, Lithuania
- Died: August 27, 2015 (aged 85); Wynnewood, Pennsylvania, U.S.
- Education: University of Chicago, PhD; University of Chicago, Masters of Arts; University of Chicago, D.B.
- Occupation: President of Elizabethtown College (1985-1996)
- Predecessor: Mark C. Ebersole
- Successor: Theodore E. Long

Gerhard Ernst Spiegler (December 4, 1929 – August 24, 2015) was an American academic. He served as professor and president of Elizabethtown College, provost of Temple University and visiting professor at the University of Hamburg, Germany.

== Biography ==
Spiegler also taught for eleven years, was provost and acting president at Haverford College, and taught at the University of California at Berkeley.

He retired as president of Elizabethtown College on August 31, 1996.

He won awards for Distinguished Research from the University of Chicago and Distinguished Teaching from the Danforth Foundation.

He was married to Ethel Spiegler, and had three adult children, Karin, Eric, and Mark.

== Education ==
- Ph.D. University of Chicago
- M.A. University of Chicago
- D.B. University of Chicago
- D.H.L. Elizabethtown College, 1996
