= Mark C. Ebersole =

American academic

Mark Chester Ebersole
- Born: November 3, 1921; Hershey, PA, USA
- Died: February 12, 2011 (aged 89); Lititz, PA, USA
- Education: Elizabethtown College, 1943
- Occupation: President of Elizabethtown College (1977–1985)
- Predecessor: Morley J. Mays
- Successor: Gerhard Spiegler

Mark Chester Ebersole (November 3, 1921 – February 12, 2011) was an American academic, a former professor and President of Elizabethtown College.

Ebersole became President of Elizabethtown College in 1977 and retired in 1985.

== Education ==
- B.A. Elizabethtown College, 1943
- M.A. History, University of Pennsylvania, 1948
- Ph.D. Religion, Columbia University, 1952
