= George Ness Falkenstein =

Former President of Elizabethtown College

- Born: July 16, 1859; York County, Pennsylvania
- Died: August 17, 1949 (aged 90); Pennsylvania
- Occupations: Educator and minister, Church of the Brethren
- Known for: Helping to found Elizabethtown College, and serving as its president (1901-1902)
- Spouse: Eva (Shellenberger) Falkenstein
- Parent(s): David Falkenstein and Mary Ness Falkenstein

Academic background
- Education: York County Academy, Brethren Normal School (Juniata College), and Oberlin College

George Ness Falkenstein (July 16, 1859 – August 17, 1949) was a former president of Elizabethtown College.

== Formative years ==
Born in York County, Pennsylvania on July 16, 1859, George Ness Falkenstein was a son of David Falkenstein and Mary (Ness) Falkenstein. Following his father's death in 1866, George Falkenstein took a job with a local grain mill to help support his mother and siblings. The money he earned there also enabled him to pursue a formal education via attendance at the York County Academy, the Brethren Normal School (known today as Juniata College), and Oberlin College.

== Academic career ==
Following his graduation from Oberlin, Falkenstein relocated west in order to accept teaching positions in Kansas and Illinois. He also supported himself as a wheat farmer and harvester. He subsequently returned east, married Eva Shellenberger, and launched a business venture with her in Kansas. When it failed, he returned to teaching; however, his job-security was compromised when a blizzard forced the closure of the school in 1888; a tornado then damaged his family's home later that same year. Briefly employed as a member of the science faculty at Mount Morris College, he packed up his family and moved east again in 1893 in order to accept a position as a minister with the Church of the Brethren in Germantown, Pennsylvania, where he remained until 1900. As the new century dawned, he then became involved in the planning of a new academic institution - Elizabethtown College, and moved his family west to become a staff member and then, in 1901 and 1902, the college's president.

== Death and interment ==
Falkenstein died in Pennsylvania on August 17, 1949, and was interred at Bupps Union Cemetery in Seven Valleys, York County.

Preceded by Isaac Newton Harvey Beahm	President of Elizabethtown College; 1901 - 1902	Succeeded by Daniel Conrad Reber
