= Roy Edwin McAuley =

- Occupation: President of Elizabethtown College (1961-1966)
- Predecessor: A. C. Baugher
- Successor: Morley J. Mays

Roy Edwin McAuley is an American academic and former President of Elizabethtown College.

McAuley served as dean from 1956 to 1961. McAuley became President of Elizabethtown College in 1961 until 1966.

Preceded by A. C. Baugher	President of Elizabethtown College; 1961 - 1966	Succeeded by Morley J. Mays
