= Daniel Conrad Reber =

Daniel Conrad Reber (February 20, 1872 in Pennsylvania – July 1962 in Indiana) was a former President of Elizabethtown College.

Reber served as president from 1902 until 1904, and again from 1909 until 1918.

Preceded by George Ness Falkenstein	President of Elizabethtown College; 1902 - 1904	Succeeded by Isaac Newton Harvey Beahm
Preceded by Isaac Newton Harvey Beahm	President of Elizabethtown College; 1909 - 1918	Succeeded by Henry Kulp Ober
