= Carl J. Strikwerda =

American historian (born 1952)

- Born: 1952 (age 73–74); Grand Rapids, Michigan
- Education: University of Michigan, PhD, History; University of Chicago, Masters, History; Calvin College, History
- Occupation: President of Elizabethtown College
- Predecessor: Theodore E. Long
- Successor: Cecilia McCormick

Carl J. Strikwerda (born 1952) is an American historian. He was the president of Elizabethtown College until 2019. He currently lives in Washington, D.C.

== Biography ==
Strikwerda is the former dean of the faculty of arts and sciences at the College of William & Mary in Williamsburg, Virginia. He has also previously worked as an associate dean in the College of Liberal Arts and Sciences at the University of Kansas.

On October 1, 2011, Strikwerda was inaugurated as Elizabethtown College's fourteenth president. He stepped down as president after two four year terms on June 30, 2019.

Strikwerda earned a bachelor's degree in history at Calvin College, in Grand Rapids, Michigan, a master's degree in history from the University of Chicago, and his Ph.D. in European history from the University of Michigan.

He served as an historical consultant to the National World War One Museum in Kansas City, Missouri. He also served as treasurer and member of the board of directors of the Council of Colleges of Arts and Sciences whose headquarters he brought to the College of William and Mary while he served there as dean.

Among the boards on which he has served are the executive committee of the Council for European Studies, as a member of the President's Trust of the American Association of Colleges and Universities, and as a member of the board of directors of public radio and TV station WITF.

His op-eds and essays have appeared in The Chronicle of Higher Education, Huffington Post, Inside Higher Ed, and History News Network.

He is married to Gail M. Bossenga, who graduated from Calvin College, received her Ph.D. in history from the University of Michigan, and writes about eighteenth century France and the origins of the French Revolution. The couple have two children, Laurna Strikwerda, who lives in Ottawa, Canada, works for the Green Building Council of Canada and is married to Ian Ward, and Tim Strikwerda, who is an assistant professor of Japanese at the University of Central Arkansas.

== Selected publications ==
- Strikwerda, Carl J. The Origins of the Contemporary Global Order: From the Nineteenth Century to the Cold War, London: Palgrave Macmillan, 2025.
- McCartan, Anne-Marie and Carl J. Strikwerda, eds. Deans and Development: Making the Case for the Liberal Arts, Williamsburg: Council of Colleges of Arts and Sciences, 2014.
- Strikwerda, Carl. A House Divided: Catholics, Socialists, and Flemish nationalists in Nineteenth-century Belgium. Lanham: Rowman & Littlefield, 1997.
- Furlough, Ellen, and Carl Strikwerda, eds. Consumers against capitalism?: consumer cooperation in Europe, North America, and Japan, 1840-1990. Lanham: Rowman & Littlefield, 1999.
- Guerin-Gonzales, Camille and Carl Strikwerda, eds. The Politics of Immigrant Workers: Labor Activism and Migration in the World Economy Since 1830. New York: Holmes and Meier, 1993; 2nd ed. 1998.

Articles, a selection:

- Strikwerda, Carl. "Too Much of a Good Thing? Consumption, Consumerism, and Consumer Cooperation in Modern History," International Review of Social History, 63 (2018), 127–142.
- Strikwerda, Carl J. "World War I and the History of Globalization," Historical Reflections/Reflexions historiques, 42:3 Winter (2016), 112–132.
- Strikwerda, Carl. "The troubled origins of European economic integration: international iron and steel and labor migration in the era of World War I." The American Historical Review (1993): 1106–1129.
- Strikwerda, Carl. "Reinterpreting the history of European integration: business, labor, and social citizenship in twentieth-century Europe." European Integration in Social and Historical Perspective 1850 to the Present eds. Jytte Klausen and Louise Tilly. Lanham: Rowman and Littlefield, 1998: 51–70.
