= Jacob Gibble Meyer =

Jacob Gibble Meyer was a former President of Elizabethtown College.

Meyer served as president from 1921 until 1924.

Meyer residence hall is named after him.

| Preceded by Henry Kulp Ober | President of Elizabethtown College; 1921–1924 | Succeeded by Henry Kulp Ober |
