= S. Dale High =

American businessman

S. Dale High is Chair Emeritus of Lancaster, Pennsylvania-based High Industries Inc. and High Real Estate Group LLC. He is a past board member of the U.S. Chamber of Commerce.

High is a graduate of Elizabethtown College. In 1995, S. Dale High founded the S. Dale High Center for Family Business at the college.

== Philanthropy ==
In 1980, High created the High Foundation, a charitable organization for addressing poverty and community conservancy in central Pennsylvania and elsewhere. Beneficiaries of the foundation include Thaddeus Stevens College of Technology, the Water Street Mission, the Lancaster Conservancy, the Fulton Theatre, and the Lancaster County Community Foundation. In 2022, High and his family transferred their stock in High Industries to the High Foundation, making the charitable organization the majority owner of the $570 million business.
