= Culture war =

Conflict between cultural values

A culture war is a form of cultural conflict between different social groups who struggle to politically impose their own ideology upon mainstream society, or upon the other. In political usage, culture war is a war metaphor for "hot-button" politics about values and ideologies, realized with intentionally adversarial social narratives meant to provoke political polarization among the mainstream of society over economic matters, such as those of public policy, as well as of consumption. As practical politics, a culture war is about social policy wedge issues that are based on abstract arguments about values, morality, and lifestyle meant to provoke political cleavage in a multicultural society.

== Etymology ==
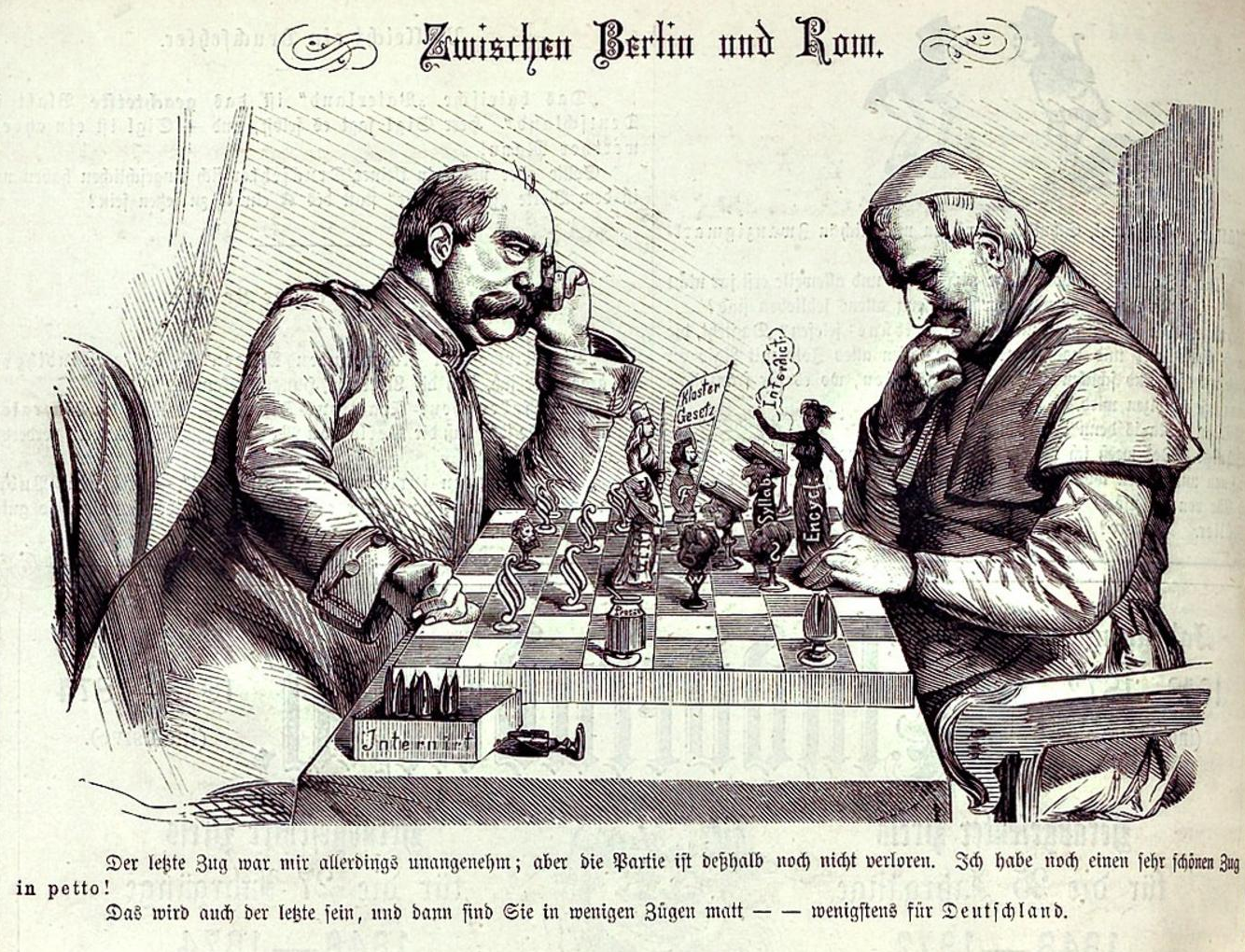
Otto Von Bismarck (left) and Pope Pius IX (right), from the German satirical magazine Kladderadatsch, 1875

=== Kulturkampf ===
The Kulturkampf (German pronunciation: [kʊlˈtuːɐ̯ˌkamp͡f]; lit. 'Cultural Struggle') was the seven-year political conflict (1871–1878) between the Catholic Church in Germany led by Pope Pius IX and the Kingdom of Prussia, led by Chancellor Otto von Bismarck, as well as other German states. The Prussian church-and-state political conflict was about the church's direct control over both education and ecclesiastical appointments in the Prussian kingdom. Moreover, when compared to other church-and-state conflicts about political culture, the Kulturkampf of Prussia also featured anti-Polish sentiment.

In modern political usage, the German term Kulturkampf describes any conflict (political, ideological, or social) between the secular government and the religious authorities of a society. The term also describes the great and small culture wars among political factions that hold deeply opposing values and beliefs within a nation, a community, and a cultural group.

In the English language, the term "culture war" is a calque of the German word Kulturkampf ("culture struggle"), which refers to a historical event in Germany. The term appears as the title of an 1875 British book review of a German pamphlet.

== Research ==
=== Criticism and evaluation ===
Since the time that James Davison Hunter first applied the concept of culture wars to American life, the idea has been subject to questions about whether "culture wars" names a real phenomenon, and if so, whether the phenomenon it describes is a cause of, or merely a result of, membership in groups like political parties and religions. Culture wars have also been subject to the criticism of being artificial, imposed, or asymmetric conflicts, rather than a result of authentic differences between cultures. Researchers have differed about the scientific validity of the notion of culture war. Some claim it does not describe real behavior, or that it describes only the behavior of a small political elite. Others claim culture war is real and widespread, and even that it is fundamental to explaining Americans' political behavior and beliefs. A 2023 study on the circulation of conspiracy theories on social media noted that disinformation actors insert polarizing claims in culture wars by taking one side or the other, thus making the adherents circulate and parrot disinformation as a rhetorical ammunition against their perceived opponents.

Political scientist Alan Wolfe participated in a series of scholarly debates in the 1990s and 2000s against Hunter, claiming that Hunter's concept of culture wars did not accurately describe the opinions or behavior of Americans, which Wolfe claimed were more united than polarized. A meta-analysis of opinion data from 1992 to 2012 published in the American Political Science Review concluded that, in contrast to a common belief that political party and religious membership shape opinion on culture war topics, instead opinions on culture war topics lead people to revise their political party and religious orientations. The researchers view culture war attitudes as "foundational elements in the political and religious belief systems of ordinary citizens."

==== Artificiality or asymmetry ====
Some writers and scholars have said that culture wars are created or perpetuated by political special interest groups, by reactionary social movements, by party dynamics, or by electoral politics as a whole. These authors view culture war not as an unavoidable result of widespread cultural differences, but as a technique used to create in-groups and out-groups for a political purpose. Political commentator E. J. Dionne has written that culture war is an electoral technique to exploit differences and grievances, remarking that the real cultural division is "between those who want to have a culture war and those who don't."

Sociologist Scott Melzer says that culture wars are created by conservative, reactive organizations and movements. Members of these movements possess a "sense of victimization at the hands of a liberal culture run amok. In their eyes, immigrants, gays, women, the poor, and other groups are (undeservedly) granted special rights and privileges." Melzer writes about the example of the National Rifle Association of America, which he says intentionally created a culture war in order to unite conservative groups, particularly groups of white men, against a common perceived threat. Similarly, religion scholar Susan B. Ridgely has written that culture wars were made possible by Focus on the Family. This organization produced conservative Christian "alternative news" that began to bifurcate American media consumption, promoting a particular "traditional family" archetype to one part of the population, particularly conservative religious women. Ridgely says that this tradition was depicted as under liberal attack, seeming to necessitate a culture war to defend the tradition.

Political scientists Matt Grossmann and David A. Hopkins have written about an asymmetry between the US's two major political parties, saying the Republican party should be understood as an ideological movement built to wage political conflict, and the Democratic party as a coalition of social groups with less ability to impose ideological discipline on members. This encourages Republicans to perpetuate and to draw new issues into culture wars, because Republicans are well equipped to fight such wars. According to The Guardian, "many on the left have argued that such [culture war] battles [a]re 'distractions' from the real fight over class and economic issues."

== Culture wars by country ==
=== United States ===
In the United States, ethnocultural politics or ethnoreligious politics refers to the pattern of certain cultural groups or religious denominations to vote heavily for one party. Groups can be based on ethnicity (such as Hispanics, Irish, Germans, etc.), race (White people, Black people, Asian Americans, etc.) or religion (Protestant and later Evangelical or Catholic, etc.) or on overlapping categories (e.g. Irish Catholics). In the Southern United States, race was the determining factor. Each of the two major parties was a coalition of ethnoreligious groups in the Second Party System (1830s–1850s) and also in the Third Party System (1850s–1890s).

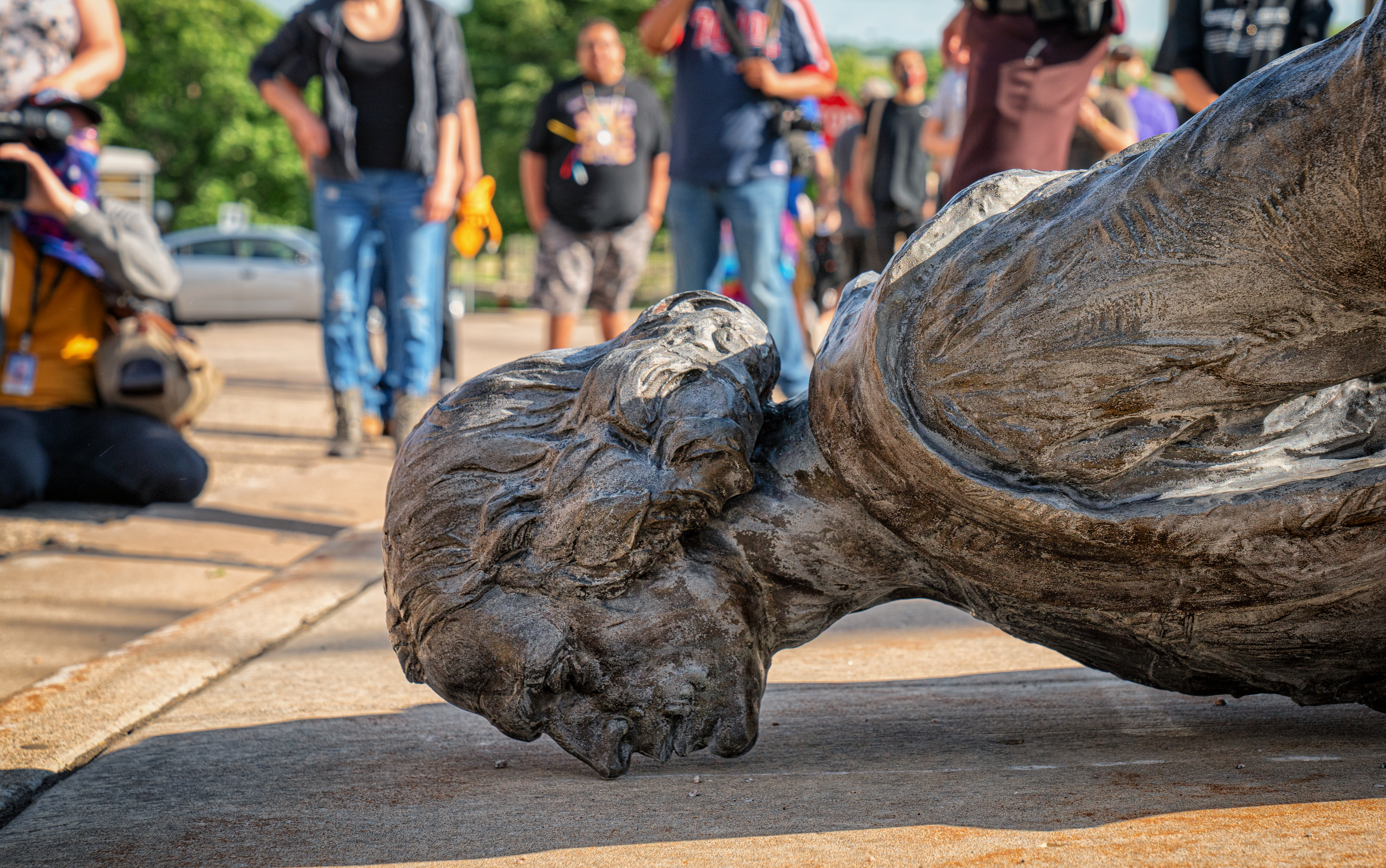
Members of the American Indian Movement toppled a statue of Christopher Columbus in Saint Paul, Minnesota, on June 10, 2020.

==== 1920s–1991: Origins ====
In American usage, culture war may imply a conflict between those values considered traditionalist or conservative and those considered progressive or liberal. This usage originated in the 1920s when urban and rural American values came into closer conflict. This followed several decades of immigration to the States by people who earlier European immigrants considered 'alien'. It was also a result of the cultural shifts and modernizing trends of the Roaring Twenties, culminating in the presidential campaign of Al Smith in 1928. In subsequent decades during the 20th century, the term was published occasionally in American newspapers. Historian Matthew Dallek argues the John Birch Society (JBS) was an early promoter of culture war ideas. Scholar Celestini Carmen traces the JBS's apocalyptic culture war rhetoric through the connections of Christian right leaders such as Tim LaHaye and Phyllis Schlafly to the JBS and their founding of the Moral Majority.

==== 1991–2001: Rise in prominence ====
James Davison Hunter, a sociologist at the University of Virginia, introduced the expression again in his 1991 publication, Culture Wars: The Struggle to Define America. Hunter described what he saw as a dramatic realignment and polarization that had transformed American politics and culture. He argued that on an increasing number of "hot-button" defining issues—abortion, gun politics, separation of church and state, privacy, recreational drug use, homosexuality, censorship—there existed two definable polarities. Furthermore, not only were there a number of divisive issues, but society had divided along essentially the same lines on these issues, so as to constitute two warring groups, defined primarily not by nominal religion, ethnicity, social class, or even political affiliation, but rather by ideological world-views. Hunter characterized this polarity as stemming from opposite impulses, toward what he referred to as Progressivism and as Orthodoxy. Others have adopted the dichotomy with varying labels. For example, Bill O'Reilly, a conservative political commentator and former host of the Fox News Channel talk show The O'Reilly Factor, emphasizes differences between "Secular-Progressives" and "Traditionalists" in his 2006 book Culture Warrior.

Historian Kristin Kobes Du Mez attributes the 1990s emergence of culture wars to the end of the Cold War in 1991. She writes that evangelical Christians viewed a particular Christian masculine gender role as the only defense of the United States against the threat of communism. When this threat ended upon the close of the Cold War, evangelical leaders transferred the perceived source of threat from foreign communism to domestic changes in gender roles and sexuality.

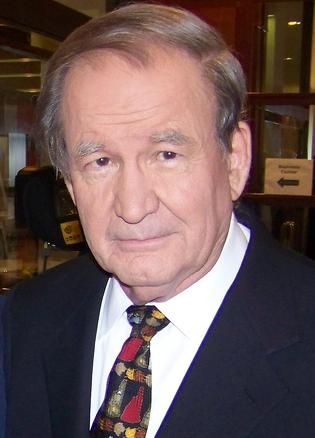
Pat Buchanan in 2008

During the 1992 presidential election, commentator Pat Buchanan mounted a campaign for the Republican nomination for president against incumbent George H. W. Bush. In a prime-time slot at the 1992 Republican National Convention, Buchanan gave his speech on the culture war. He argued: "There is a religious war going on in our country for the soul of America. It is a cultural war, as critical to the kind of nation we will one day be as was the Cold War itself." In addition to criticizing environmentalists and feminism, he portrayed public morality as a defining issue:

The agenda [Bill] Clinton and [Hillary] Clinton would impose on America—abortion on demand, a litmus test for the Supreme Court, homosexual rights, discrimination against religious schools, women in combat units—that's change, all right. But it is not the kind of change America wants. It is not the kind of change America needs. And it is not the kind of change we can abide in a nation that we still call God's country.

A month later, Buchanan characterized the conflict as about power over society's definition of right and wrong. He named abortion, sexual orientation and popular culture as major fronts—and mentioned other controversies, including clashes over the Confederate flag, Christmas, and taxpayer-funded art. He also said that the negative attention his "culture war" speech received was itself evidence of the United States' polarization.

The culture war had significant impact on national politics in the 1990s. The rhetoric of the Christian Coalition of America may have weakened president George H. W. Bush's chances for re-election in 1992 and helped his successor, Bill Clinton, win reelection in 1996. On the other hand, the rhetoric of conservative cultural warriors helped Republicans gain control of Congress in 1994. The culture wars influenced the debate over state-school history curricula in the United States in the 1990s. In particular, debates over the development of national educational standards in 1994 revolved around whether the study of American history should be a "celebratory" or "critical" undertaking and involved such prominent public figures as Lynne Cheney, Rush Limbaugh, and historian Gary Nash.

==== 2001–2012: Post-9/11 era ====
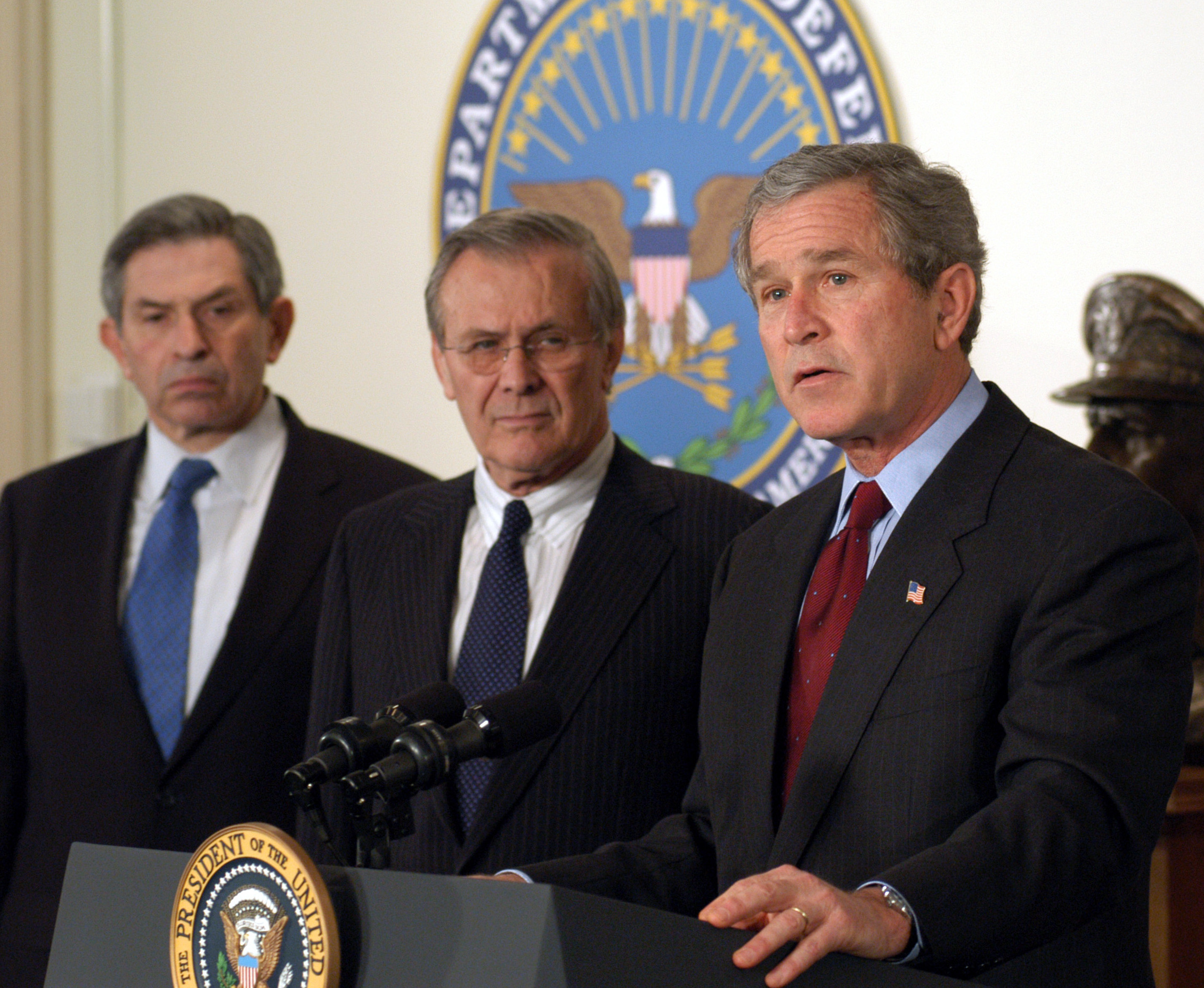
(from right to left) 43rd President George W. Bush, Donald Rumsfeld, and Paul Wolfowitz were prominent neoconservatives of the 2000s

A political view called neoconservatism shifted the terms of the debate in the early 2000s. Neoconservatives differed from their opponents in that they interpreted problems facing the nation as moral issues rather than economic or political ones. For example, neoconservatives saw the decline of the traditional family structure as well as the decline of religion in American society as spiritual crises that required a spiritual response. Critics accused neoconservatives of confusing cause and effect.

During the 2000s, voting for Republicans began to correlate heavily with traditionalist or orthodox religious belief across diverse religious sects. Voting for Democrats became more correlated with liberal or modernist religious belief, and with being nonreligious. Belief in scientific conclusions, such as climate change, also became tightly coupled with political party affiliation in this era, causing climate scholar Andrew Hoffman to observe that climate change had "become enmeshed in the so-called culture wars."

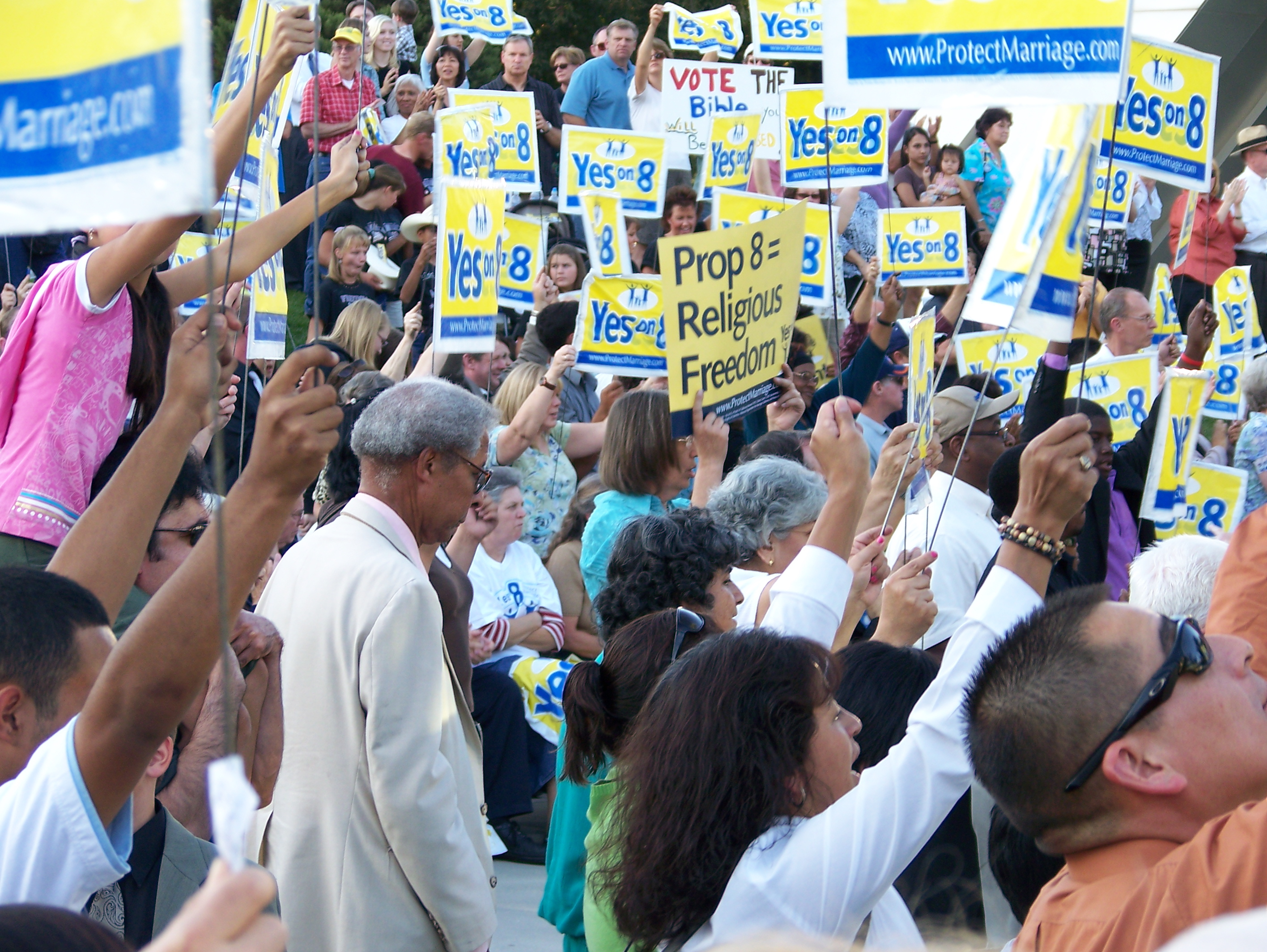
Rally for Proposition 8, an item on the 2008 California ballot to ban same-sex marriage

Topics traditionally associated with culture war were not prominent in media coverage of the 2008 election season, with the exception of coverage of vice-presidential candidate Sarah Palin, who drew attention to her conservative religion and created a performative climate change denialism brand for herself. Palin's defeat in the election and subsequent resignation as governor of Alaska caused the Center for American Progress to predict "the coming end of the culture wars," which they attributed to demographic change, particularly high rates of acceptance of same-sex marriage among millennials.

==== 2012–present: Broadening of the culture war ====
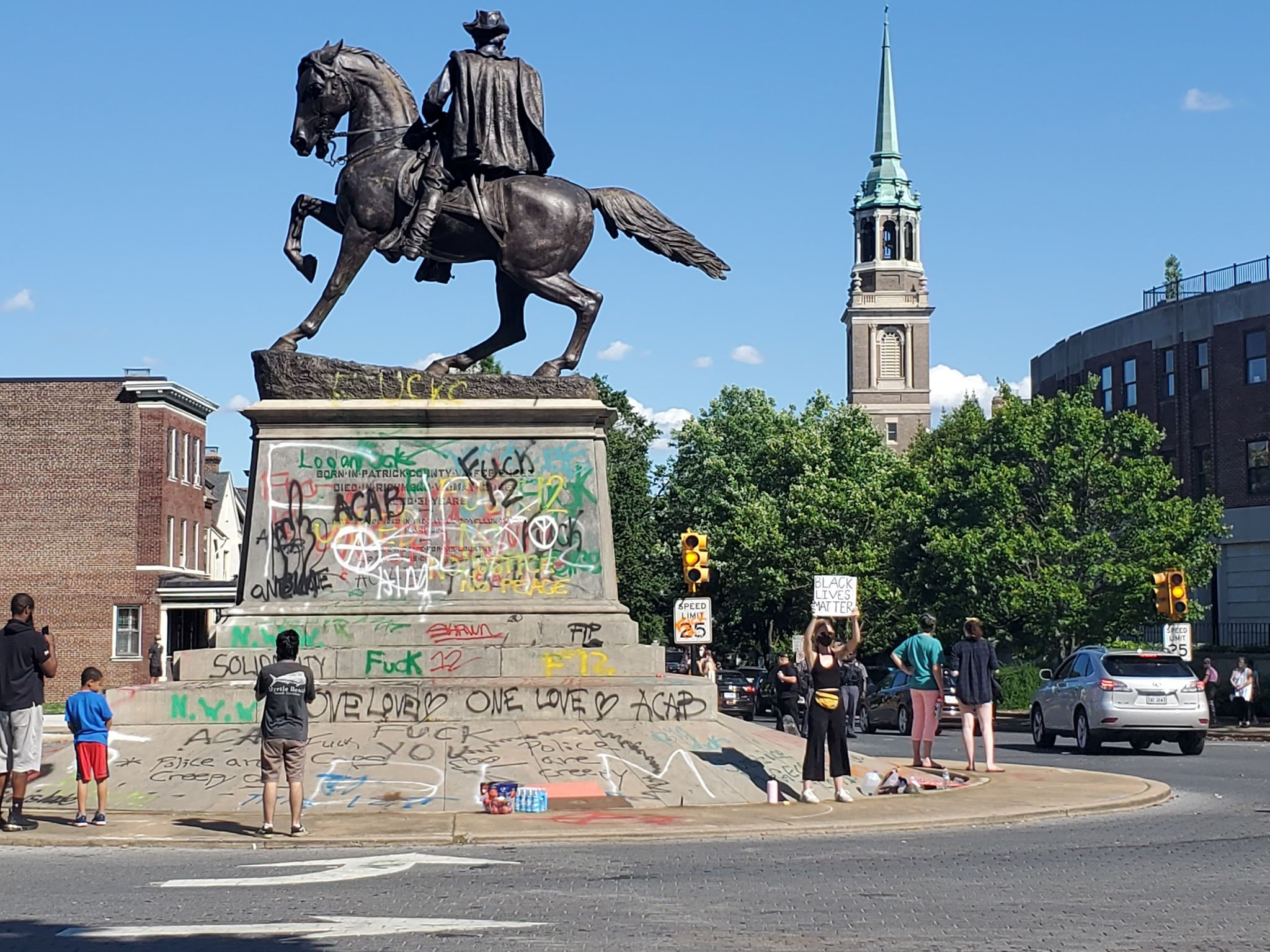
The J. E. B. Stuart Monument, defaced during protests in Richmond, Virginia, was removed on July 7, 2020.

In the early 2010s, the American right took issue with the perceived worldwide dominance of leftism in international politics and corporate activity, anti-nationalism, and secular human rights policies and activism not based on Abrahamic religious worldviews.

While traditional culture war issues, like abortion, continue to be a focal point, the issues identified with the culture war broadened and intensified in the mid-late 2010s. Jonathan Haidt, author of The Coddling of the American Mind, identified a rise in cancel culture via social media among young progressives since 2012, which he believes had "transformative effects on university life and later on politics and culture throughout the English-speaking world," in what Haidt and other commentators have called the "Great Awokening". Journalist Michael Grunwald says that "President Donald Trump has pioneered a new politics of perpetual culture war" and lists Black Lives Matter, US national anthem protests, climate change, education policy, healthcare policy including Obamacare, and infrastructure policy as culture war issues in 2018. The rights of transgender people and the role of religion in lawmaking were identified as "new fronts in the culture war" by political scientist Jeremiah Castle, as the polarization of public opinion on these two topics resembles that of previous culture war issues. In 2020, during the COVID-19 pandemic, North Dakota governor Doug Burgum described opposition to wearing face masks as a "senseless" culture war issue that jeopardizes human safety.

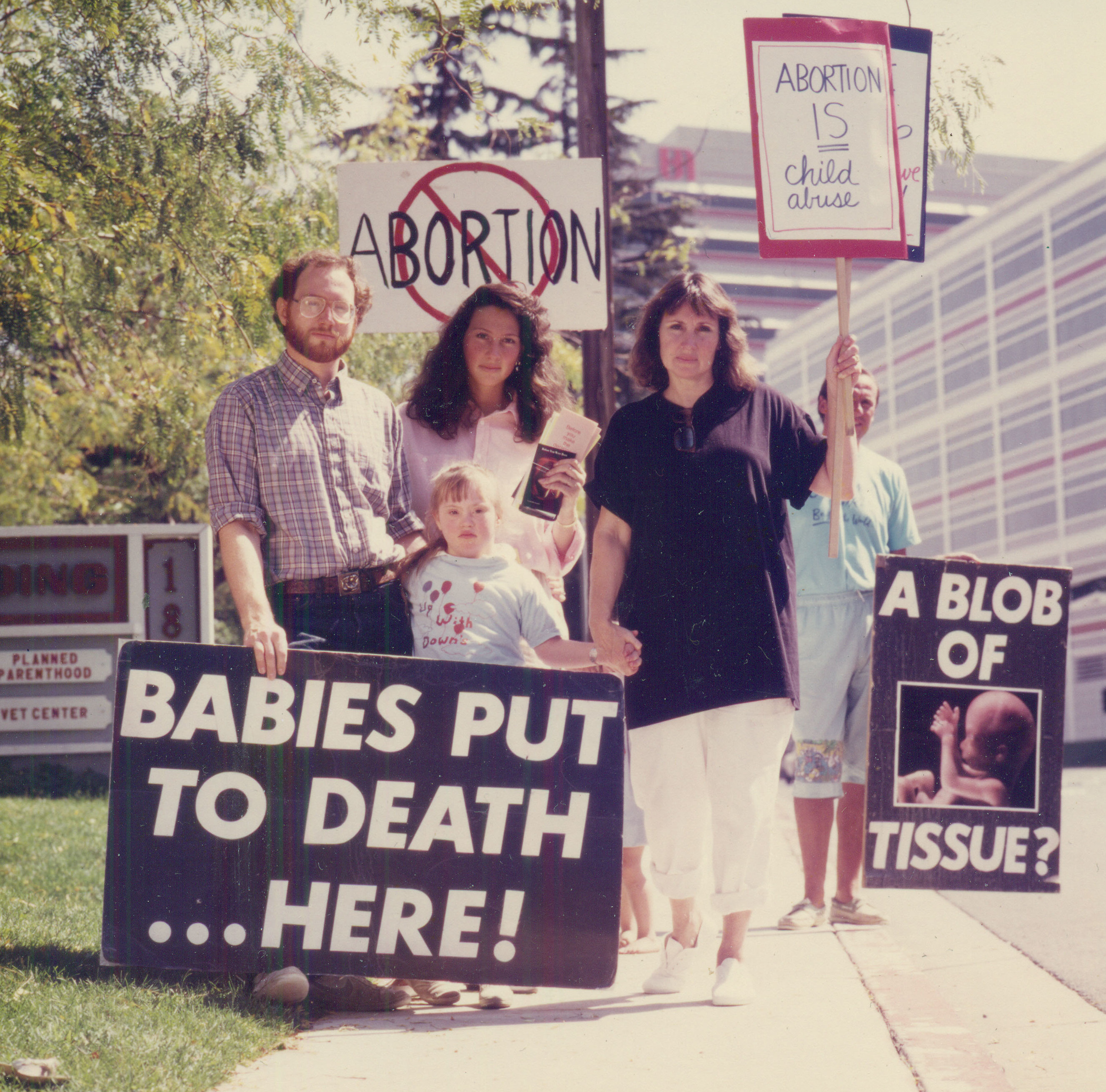
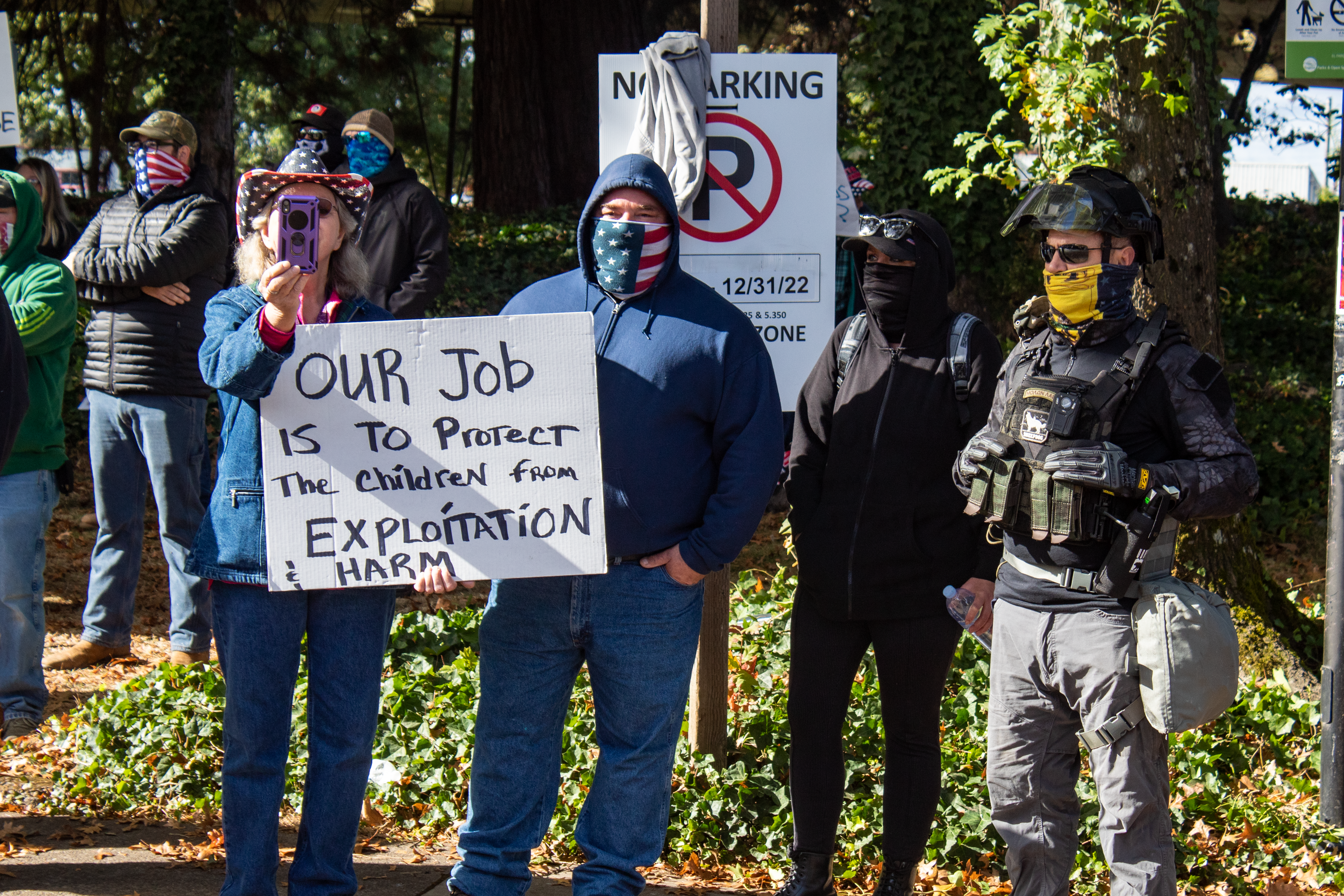
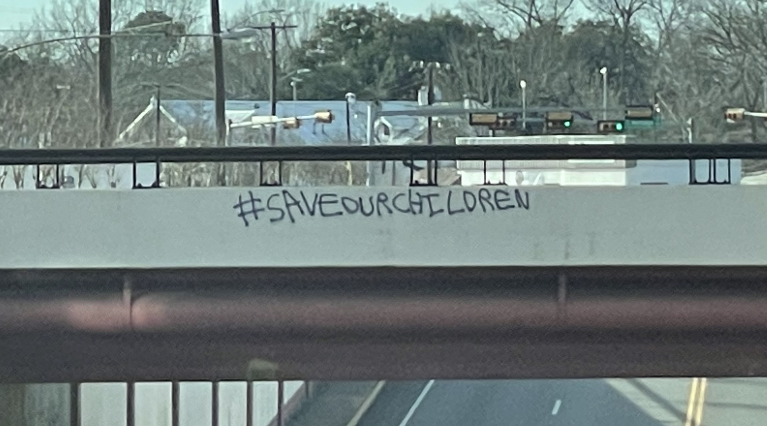
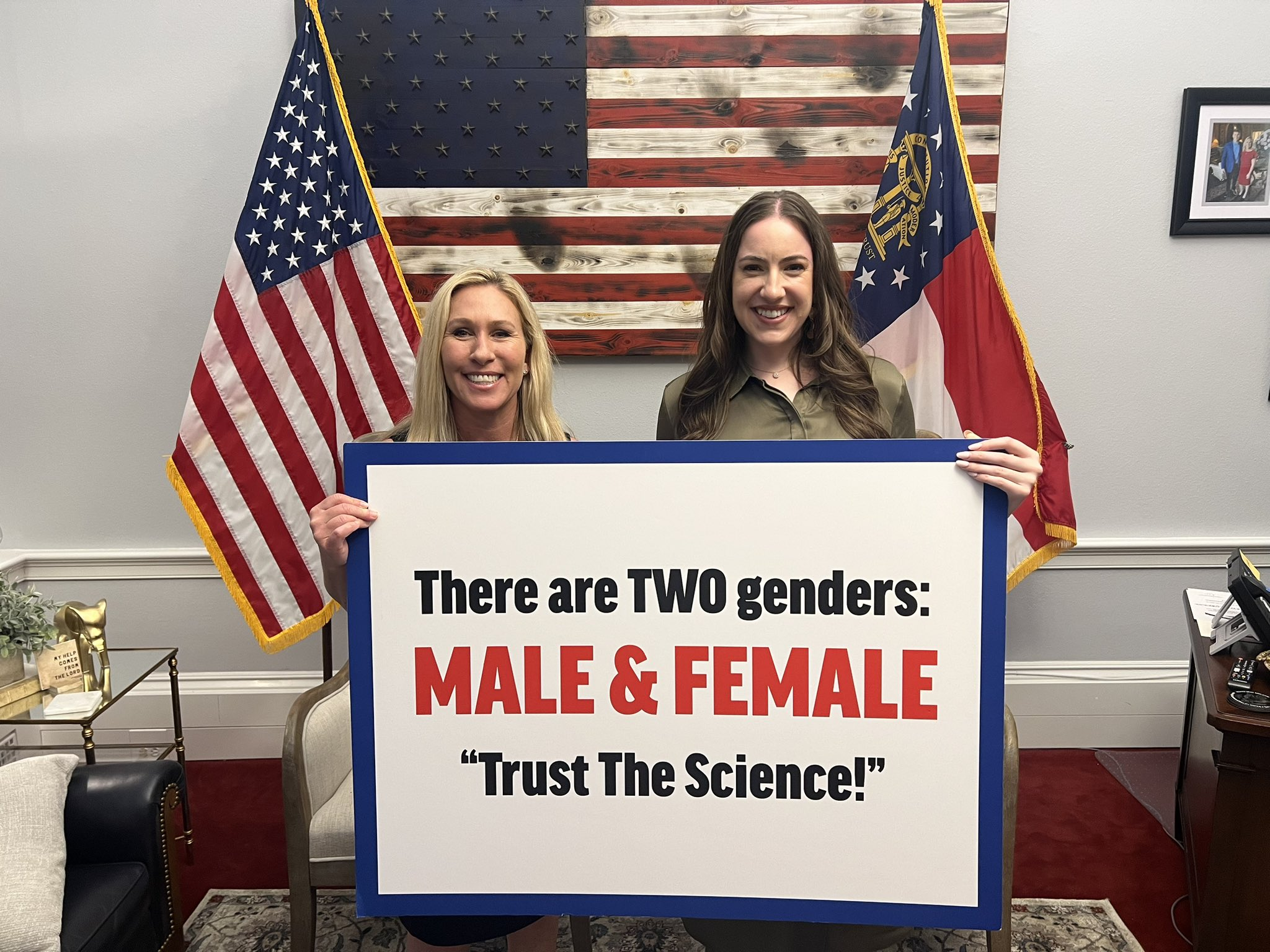
Clockwise from top left: anti-abortion protesters in 1986; members of the Proud Boys protest a drag queen story hour; Representative Marjorie Taylor Greene of Georgia and Libs of TikTok creator Chaya Raichik hold up an anti-transgender sign; "Save Our Children" graffiti near downtown Lufkin, Texas in relation to the LGBT grooming conspiracy theory.

This broader understanding of culture war issues in the mid-late 2010s and 2020s is associated with a political strategy called "owning the libs." Conservative media figures employing this strategy emphasize and expand upon culture war issues with the goal of upsetting liberals. According to Nicole Hemmer of Columbia University, this strategy is a substitute for the cohesive conservative ideology that existed during the Cold War. It holds a conservative voting bloc together in the absence of shared policy preferences among the bloc's members.

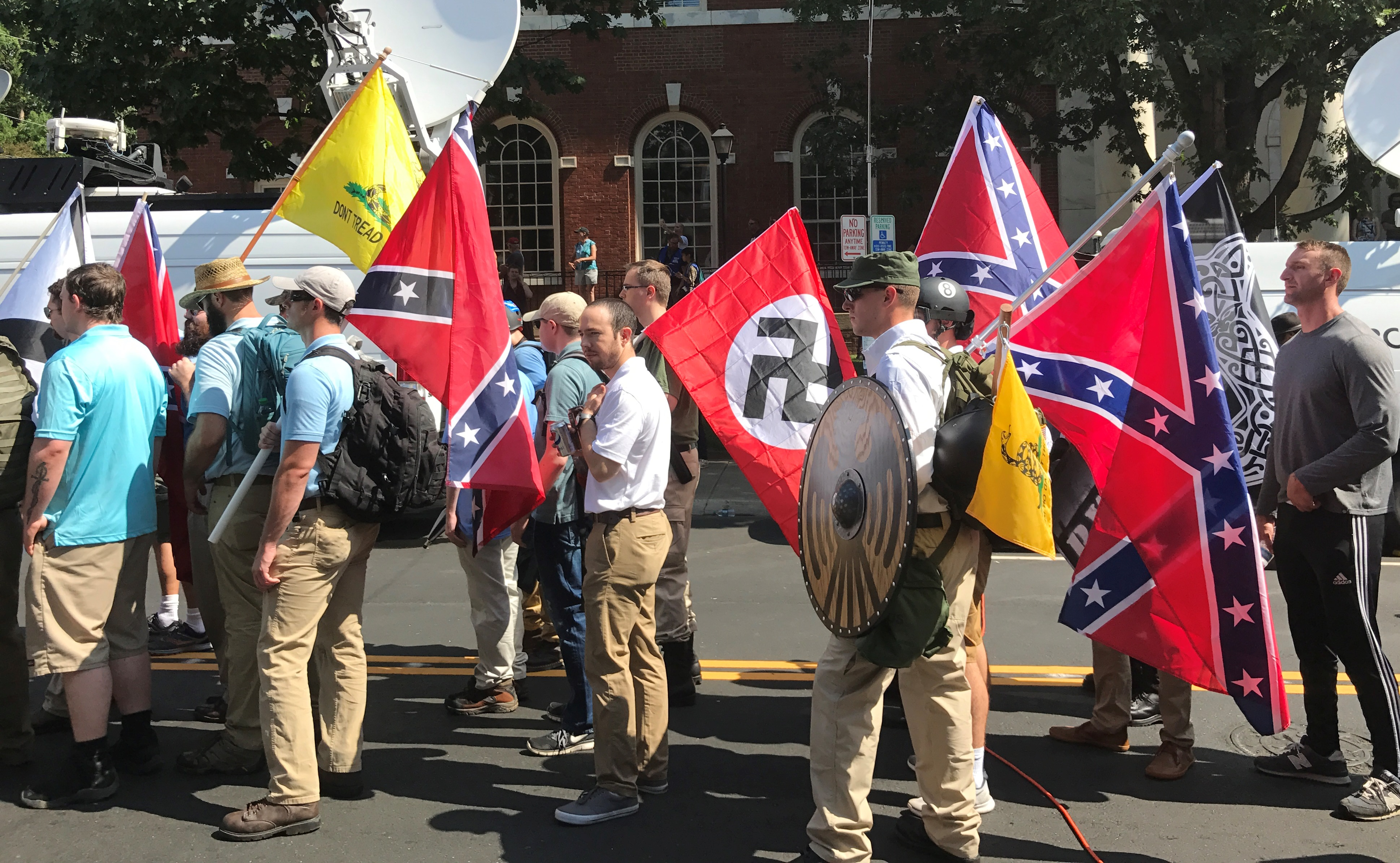
Hundreds of participants at the Unite the Right rally in Charlottesville, Virginia, in August 2017; an event associated with the alt-right and neo-Nazi movements, regarded as a battleground in the culture wars.

A number of conflicts about diversity in popular culture occurring in the 2010s, such as the Gamergate controversy, Comicsgate and the Sad Puppies science fiction voting campaign, were identified in the media as being examples of the culture war. Journalist Caitlin Dewey described Gamergate as a "proxy war" for a larger culture war between those who want greater inclusion of women and minorities in cultural institutions versus anti-feminists and traditionalists who do not. The perception that culture war conflict had been demoted from electoral politics to popular culture led writer Jack Meserve to call popular movies, games, and writing the "last front in the culture war" in 2015.

These conflicts about representation in popular culture re-emerged into electoral politics via the alt-right and alt-lite movements. According to media scholar Whitney Phillips, Gamergate "prototyped" strategies of harassment and controversy-stoking that proved useful in political strategy. For example, Republican political strategist Steve Bannon publicized pop-culture conflicts during the 2016 presidential campaign of Donald Trump, encouraging a young audience to "come in through Gamergate or whatever and then get turned onto politics and Trump."

=== Canada ===
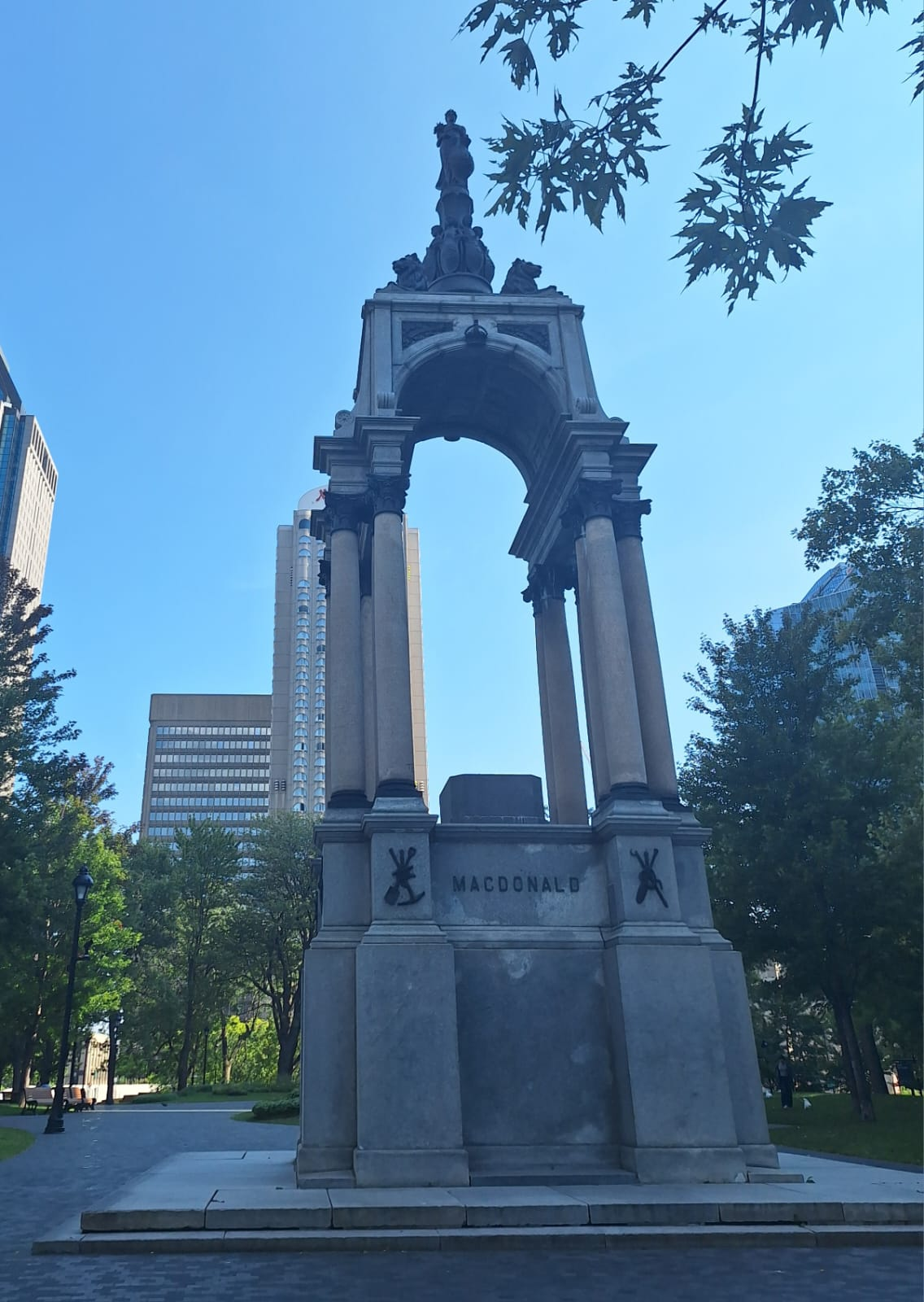
The empty pedestal of the former John A. Macdonald monument in Montreal, left vacant after the statue of Canada's first Prime Minister was toppled during a 2020 protest and later removed

Some observers in Canada have used the term "culture war" to refer to differing values between Western versus Eastern Canada, urban versus rural Canada, as well as conservatism versus liberalism and progressivism. The phrase has also been used to describe the Harper government's attitude towards the arts community. Andrew Coyne termed this negative policy towards the arts community as "class warfare."

=== Australia ===
During the tenure of the Liberal–National Coalition government of 1996 to 2007, interpretations of Aboriginal history became a part of a wider political debate regarding Australian national pride and symbolism occasionally called the "culture wars", more often the "history wars". This debate extended into a controversy over the presentation of history in the National Museum of Australia and in high-school history curricula. It also migrated into the general Australian media, with major broadsheets such as The Australian, The Sydney Morning Herald and The Age regularly publishing opinion pieces on the topic. Marcia Langton has referred to much of this wider debate as "war porn" and as an "intellectual dead end".

Two Australian prime ministers, Paul Keating (in office 1991–1996) and John Howard (in office 1996–2007), became major participants in the "wars". According to Mark McKenna's analysis for the Australian Parliamentary Library, Howard believed that Keating portrayed Australia pre-Whitlam (PM 1972–1975) in an unduly negative light, while Keating sought to distance the modern Labor movement from its historical support for the monarchy and for the White Australia policy by arguing that it was the conservative Australian parties which had been barriers to national progress. He accused Britain of having abandoned Australia during the Second World War. Keating staunchly supported a symbolic apology to Aboriginal Australians for their mistreatment at the hands of previous administrations, and outlined his view of the origins and potential solutions to contemporary Aboriginal disadvantage in his Redfern Park Speech of December 10, 1992 (drafted with the assistance of historian Don Watson). In 1999, following the release of the 1998 Bringing Them Home Report, Howard passed a parliamentary Motion of Reconciliation describing treatment of Aboriginal people as the "most blemished chapter" in Australian history, but declined to issue an official apology. Howard saw an apology as inappropriate as it would imply "intergeneration guilt", saying measures were a better response to contemporary Aboriginal disadvantage. Keating argued for the eradication of remaining symbols linked to colonial origins, including deference for ANZAC Day, for the Australian flag, and for the monarchy in Australia, while Howard supported these institutions. Unlike fellow Labor leaders and contemporaries, Bob Hawke (PM 1983–1991) and Kim Beazley (Labor Party leader 2005–2006), Keating never travelled to Gallipoli for ANZAC Day ceremonies. In 2008 he described those who gathered there as "misguided".

The defeat of the Howard government in the 2007 Australian federal election and its replacement by the Rudd Labor government altered the dynamic of the debate. Rudd made an official apology to the Aboriginal Stolen Generations with bi-partisan support. Like Keating, Rudd supported an Australian republic, but in contrast to Keating, Rudd declared support for the Australian flag and supported the commemoration of ANZAC Day; he also expressed admiration for Liberal Party founder Robert Menzies. Subsequent to the 2007 change of government, and prior to the passage of the official apology, historian Richard Nile argued: "the culture and history wars are over and with them should also go the adversarial nature of intellectual debate", a view contested by others, including conservative commentator Janet Albrechtsen.

Climate change in Australia is also considered a highly divisive or politically controversial topic, to the point it is sometimes called a "culture war".

The 2017 Same Sex Marriage Plebiscite was also a divisive topic within Australia with many supporters of marriage equality were targeted with Homophobic vandalism in the lead up to the Plebiscite.

Since the defeat of the 2023 Australian Indigenous Voice referendum, there has been a significant calls reignited from conservative politicians and commentators, including former federal opposition leader Peter Dutton to oppose or scale down Indigenous Reconciliation, viewing customs such as Welcome to Country ceremonies and placing the Aboriginal and Torres Strait Islander flags alongside the national flag as "divisive".

=== African continent ===
According to political scientist Constance G. Anthony, American culture war perspectives on human sexuality were exported to Africa as a form of neocolonialism. In his view, this began during the AIDS epidemic in Africa, with the United States government first tying HIV/AIDS assistance money to evangelical leadership and the Christian right during the Bush administration, then to LGBTQ tolerance during the administration of Barack Obama. This stoked a culture war that resulted in (among others) the Uganda Anti-Homosexuality Act of 2014.

Zambian scholar Kapya Kaoma notes that because "the demographic center of Christianity is shifting from the global North to the global South" Africa's influence on Christianity worldwide is increasing. American conservatives export their culture wars to Africa, Kaoma says, particularly when they realize they may be losing the battle back home. US Christians have framed their anti-LGBT initiatives in Africa as standing in opposition to a "Western gay agenda", a framing which Kaoma finds ironic.

North American and European conspiracy theories have become widespread in West Africa via social media, according to 2021 survey by First Draft News. COVID-19 misinformation, New World Order conspiracy thinking, QAnon and other conspiracy theories associated with culture war topics are spread by American, Pro-Russian, French-language, and local disinformation websites and social media accounts, including prominent politicians in Nigeria. This has contributed to vaccine hesitancy in West Africa, with 60 percent of survey respondents saying they were unlikely to try to get vaccinated, and an erosion of trust in institutions in the region.

=== United Kingdom ===
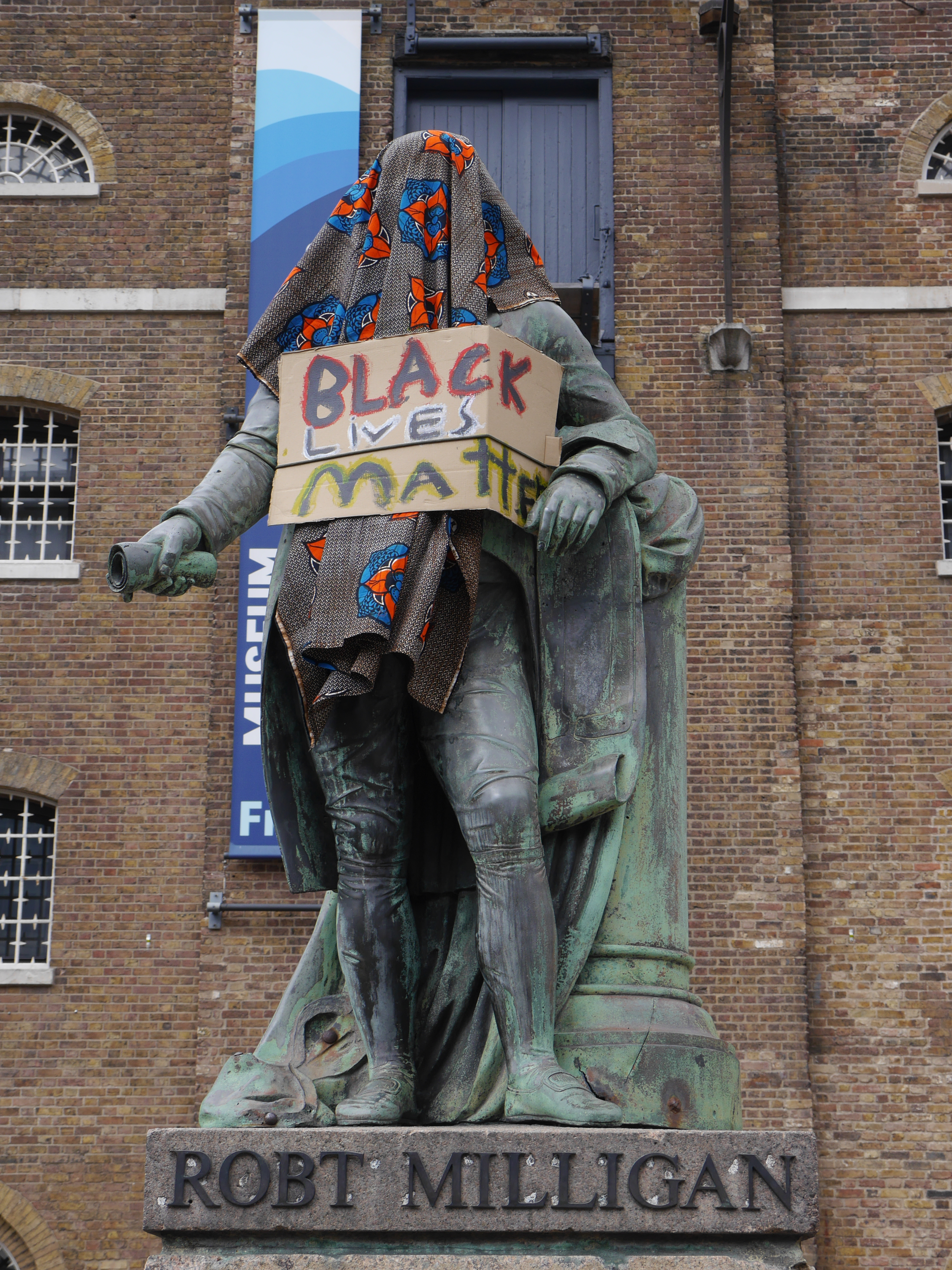
The statue of Robert Milligan on June 9, 2020, the day of its removal

A 2021 report from King's College London argued that many people's views on cultural issues in Britain had become tied up with the side of the Brexit debate with which they identify, while the public party-political identities, although not as strong, show similar alignments and that around half the country held relatively strong views on "culture war" issues such as debates on Britain's colonial history or Black Lives Matter; however, the report concluded Britain's cultural and political divide was not as stark as the Republican–Democratic divide in the US and that a sizeable section of the public can be categorised as having either moderate views or as being disengaged from social debates. It also found that The Guardian, as opposed to the centre-right newspapers, was more likely to talk about the culture wars.

The Conservative Party have been described as attempting to ignite culture wars in regard to "conservative values" under the tenure of Prime Minister Boris Johnson. Others argue that it is the left who are engaging in "culture wars", particularly against liberal values, accepted words, and British institutions. Observers such as Johns Hopkins University professor Yascha Mounk and journalist and author Louise Perry have argued that the collapse in support for the Labour Party during the 2019 United Kingdom general election came as a result of both a media-induced public perception and a deliberate strategy of Labour of pursuing messages and policy ideas based on cultural issues that resonated with more university educated grassroots activists on the left of the party but alienated Labour's traditional working class voters.

An April 2022 survey found evidence that Britons are less divided on "culture war" issues than has often been portrayed in the media. The greatest predictor of opinion was how people voted in the UK's referendum on membership of the European Union, Brexit, yet even among those who voted Leave, 75% agreed "it is important to be attentive to issues of race and social justice". Similarly, even among Remainers and those who last voted for the Labour Party, there was moderately strong support for several socially conservative positions.

=== Europe ===
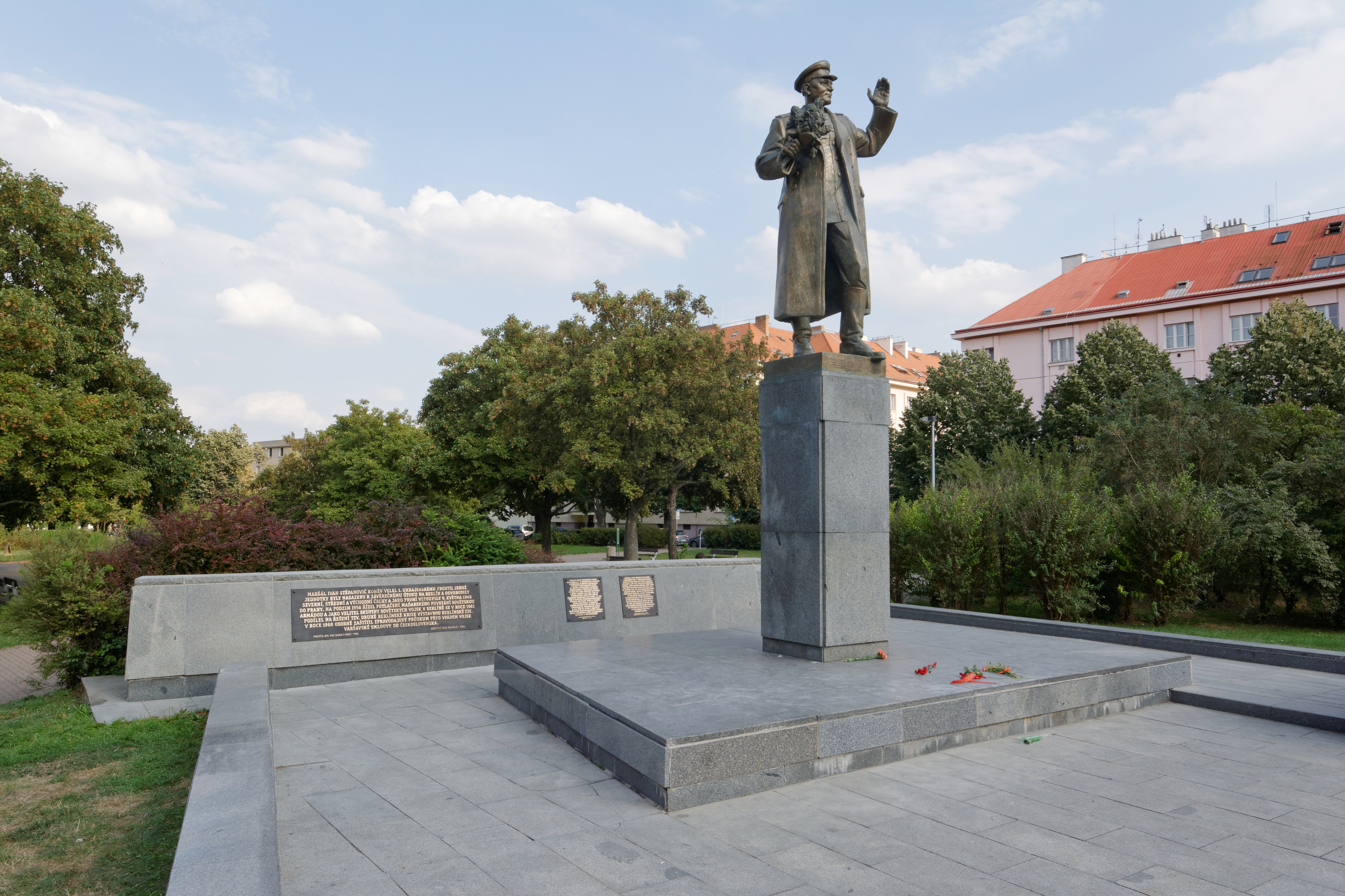
Statue of Ivan Konev in Prague was removed in 2020.

In 2020, French president Emmanuel Macron promised that France would not erase elements of its history or remove statues of controversial public figures, saying "The Republic won't erase any name from its history. It will forget none of its artworks, it won't take down statues."

Several politicians, such as Poland's Law and Justice party, Hungary's Viktor Orbán, Serbia's Aleksandar Vučić, and Slovenia's Janez Janša, have been often accused of fomenting culture wars in their respective countries by encouraging dissent, resistance to LGBT rights, and restrictions on abortion. One facet of the controversy in Poland is the removal of Soviet War Memorials, which is divisive because some Poles viewed the memorials positively as commemorations of their ancestors who died during World War II, while others felt negatively due to the oppression that some Poles experienced under the Soviet-backed Polish People's Republic. Culture war in Hungary is alleged by Kim Scheppele to be a disguise for democratic backsliding by Orbán. Ukraine also experienced a decades-long culture war pitting the eastern, predominately Russian-speaking, regions against the western Ukrainian-speaking areas of the country. LGBT rights are controversial in Poland, as exemplified by President Andrzej Duda's vow in 2020 to oppose both same-sex marriage and LGBT adoption.

Different interpretations of bitter events during World War II have become especially contentious in Poland since 2015, shortly after the start of the Russo-Ukrainian War. One disputed issue is whether Poland bears any responsibility for the Holocaust, or whether Poland was entirely a victim of Nazi Germany. This dispute is embodied by the "Polish death camp" controversy (involving concentration camps that had been built by Nazi Germany during World War II on German-occupied Polish soil) and an attempt to address that controversy with a now partly repealed law.

A second issue, also addressed by the partly repealed law, revolves around Poland–Ukraine relations. In the region, in passing a law to criminalize negative interpretations of the country's collaborationist nationalist movements during World War II, Poland is not alone, and Poland–Ukraine relations have suffered as a result of a similar law in Ukraine that was criticized in Poland for deflecting blame away from the Ukrainian Insurgent Army and their massacres of Poles in Volhynia and Eastern Galicia.

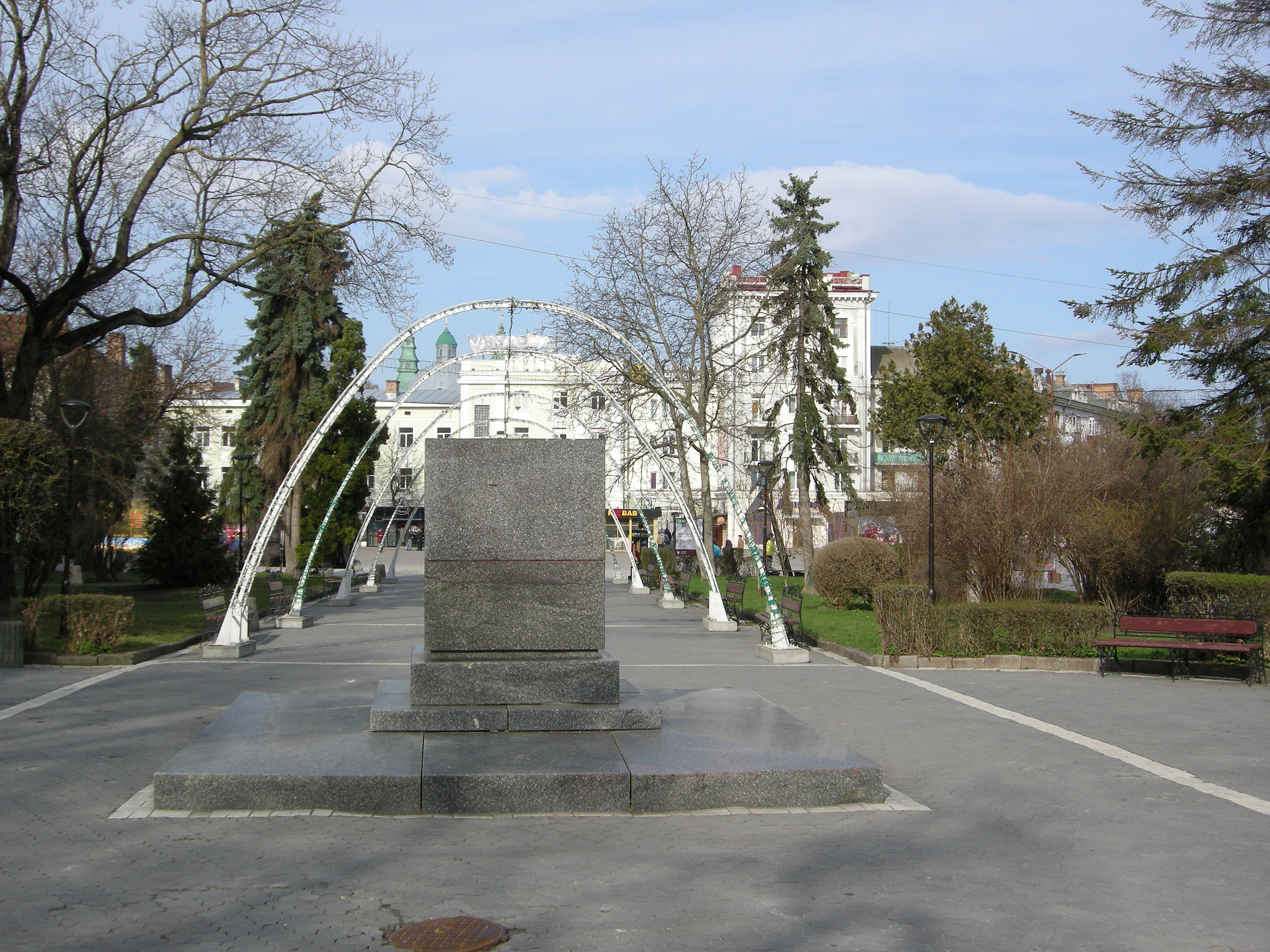
The empty plinth of a statue dedicated to Alexander Pushkin in Ternopil, Ukraine, April 11, 2022

Derussification in Ukraine is a process of removing Russian influence from the post-Soviet country of Ukraine. This derussification started after the collapse of the Soviet Union in 1991 and intensified with the demolition of monuments to Lenin during Euromaidan in 2014 and the further systemic process of decommunization in Ukraine. The Russian invasion of Ukraine gave a strong impetus to the process.

In 2024, the city of Vienna rejected a monument to Polish King John III Sobieski due to concerns about Islamophobia and anti-Turkish sentiment.

== See also ==
- Class conflict
- Ethnic conflict
- Identity politics

=== Drugs ===
- Drug decriminalization
- Harm reduction
- Legal drinking age
- War on drugs

=== Education and parenting ===
- Corporal punishment and child discipline, most notably spanking
- Creation–evolution controversy
- Family values
- Homeschooling and educational choice
- Sexual education and Abstinence-only sex education

=== Environment and energy ===
- Global warming controversy

=== Gender and sexuality ===
- Age disparity in sexual relationships
- Age of consent
- Anti-gender movement
- Circumcision controversies
- Feminism
- LGBTQ grooming conspiracy theory
- LGBT rights and same-sex marriage
- Polyamory
- Sex work
- Sexual revolution
- Toplessness and Nudity

=== Law and government ===
- Crypto wars
- Disfranchisement
- Gerrymandering
- Gun rights
- Immigration reform
- Law and order
- Red state vs. blue state divide

=== Life issues ===
- Anti-war movement
- Capital punishment
- Reproductive rights including birth control and in vitro fertilization (and their coverage by insurance)
- Right to die movement and euthanasia
- Stem-cell research
- Universal healthcare

=== Society and culture ===
- Cancel culture
- Counterculture
- Cultural Marxism conspiracy theory
- Cultural Revolution
- Expurgation – Form of censorship of artistic or other media works
- Geographical renaming
- History wars
- Kulturkampf
- Media bias in the U.S.
- Moral absolutism vs. moral relativism
- Multiculturalism
- Negationism
- Owning the libs
- Permissive society
- Race, affirmative action
- Secularism and secularization
- Social justice warrior
- Squatting
- Theory wars
- Woke
