= Jim Tennant =

American baseball player (1907-1967)

- Pitcher
- Born: March 3, 1907; Shepherdstown, West Virginia
- Died: April 16, 1967 (aged 60); Trumbull, Connecticut
- Batted: Right Threw: Right

MLB debut
- September 28, 1929, for the New York Giants

Last MLB appearance
- September 28, 1929, for the New York Giants

MLB statistics
- Win–loss record: 0–0
- Earned run average: 0.00
- Strikeouts: 1
- Stats at Baseball Reference

Teams
- New York Giants (1929)

James McDonnell Tennant (March 3, 1907 – April 16, 1967) was a pitcher in Major League Baseball. He made one relief appearance for the New York Giants, on September 28, 1929, as the third of four pitchers in relief of Carl Hubbell. Tennant also played for George Washington University and Elizabethtown College.
