= Morley J. Mays =

Morley Josiah Mays
- Born: December 13, 1911; Johnstown, PA, USA
- Died: July 5, 1998 (aged 86)
- Education: Juniata College, 1932
- Occupation: President of Elizabethtown College (1966-1977)
- Predecessor: Roy Edwin McAuley
- Successor: Mark C. Ebersole

Morley Josiah Mays (December 13, 1911 – July 5, 1998) was an American academic, a former professor and President of Elizabethtown College.

== Education ==
Mays graduated from Juniata College in 1932.

== Professional career ==
In 1963, Mays became first vice president at Juniata College.

Mays became President of Elizabethtown College in 1966 until 1977. In 1977 he became interim president of Albright College.

He was a founder and chair of Brethren Colleges Abroad.

Mays served as Church of the Brethren moderator at the 1969 Annual Conference in Louisville, Kentucky.

He died on July 5, 1998, at the age of 86.
