= Elizabethtown College =

Private college in Elizabethtown, Pennsylvania, US

- Motto: Educate for Service
- Type: Private college
- Established: 1899; 127 years ago
- Religious affiliation: Church of the Brethren
- Endowment: $116.65 million (2025)
- President: Elizabeth “Betty” A. Rider
- Faculty: 123 full-time
- Undergraduates: 1,737 (fall 2022)
- Postgraduates: 64
- Location: Elizabethtown, Pennsylvania, United States; 40.15°N 76.5919444°W
- Campus: Residential Area 200 acres (0.81 km^{2}) including Lake Placida
- Colors: Dark and light blue
- Nickname: Blue Jays
- Sporting affiliations: NCAA Division III – Landmark Conference
- Website: etown.edu
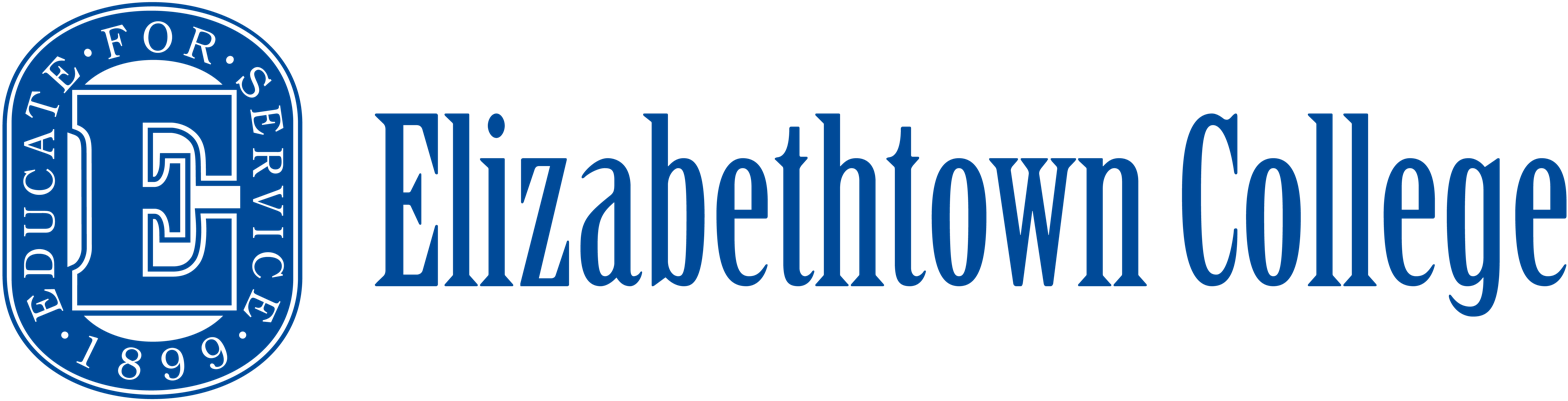

Elizabethtown College (informally Etown) is a private college in Elizabethtown, Pennsylvania.

== History ==
=== Founding and early years ===
Elizabethtown College was founded in 1899 by members of the Church of the Brethren in response to an initiative by Jacob G. Francis. Francis advocated for Elizabethtown because of the proximity to the railways. First classes for the new college were held on November 13, 1900, in the Heisey Building in downtown Elizabethtown. During its first two decades, the college operated as an academy, offering a limited curriculum centering on four-year teaching degrees and high school type classes.

=== 1920–1950 ===
In 1921, the Pennsylvania Department of Public Instruction accredited the college, and authorized its first baccalaureate degrees in arts and sciences. Later, in 1928, the college was approved by the Pennsylvania Supreme Court for pre-law education. In 1948, Elizabethtown College became accredited by the Middle States Association.

=== Presidents ===
The college's presidents were referred to as principals prior to 1902.

- Isaac Newton Harvey "I.N.H." Beahm, 1900–1901 & 1904–1909
- George Ness Falkenstein, 1901–1902
- Daniel Conrad Reber, 1902–1904 & 1909–1918
- Henry Kulp Ober, 1918–1921 & 1924–1928
- Jacob Gibble Meyer, 1921–1924
- Ralph Weist Schlosser, 1928–1929 & 1930–1941
- Harry Hess Nye, 1929–1930
- Charles Abba "A.C." Baugher, 1941–1961
- Roy Edwin McAuley, 1961–1966
- Morley Josiah Mays, 1966–1977
- Mark Chester Ebersole, 1977–1985
- Gerhard Ernest Spiegler, 1985–1996
- Theodore E. Long, 1996–2011
- Carl Strikwerda, 2011–2019
- Cecilia McCormick, 2019–2021
- Elizabeth “Betty” Rider, 2022–present

== Academics ==
The college maintains 19 academic departments, offering 53 majors and 90+ minors and concentrations.

=== Continuing education ===
Over 50 years, the college's adult program evolved into what is known today as the School of Graduate and Professional Studies (SGPS). The school offers graduate degree programs, including Master of Business Administration, Curriculum and Instruction, and Master of Music Education.

=== Honors program ===
Established in 1999, the Elizabethtown College Honors Program is a member of the National Collegiate Honors Council. The Honors Program was founded with an endowment gift from The Hershey Company.

== Student life ==
The Office of Student Activities (OSA) serves as a co-curricular educator and facilitator in creating a social environment, such as through its T.G.I.S. and Student Involvement Fairs.

Elizabethtown offers student-run media that include a newspaper—The Etownian; a literary magazine—Fine Print; a television station—ECTV-40; a radio station—WWEC 88.3 FM; and a yearbook—the Conestogan. Elizabethtown is affiliated with the Brethren Colleges Abroad (BCA) program, which allows students to study abroad.

Elizabethtown offers several performing arts extracurriculars. The College's co-ed dance group, Emotion, is the College's largest club. There are three primary student-run a cappella groups—Melica (all-female), Phalanx (all-male), and Vocalign (co-ed)—that perform at campus events like the Tree-Lighting ceremony and annual showcases. Vocalign is the only coed a cappella group on campus and was established in 2007.

== Athletics ==
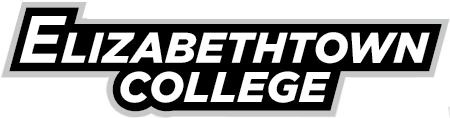
Elizabethtown athletics mark

Elizabethtown College is a member of NCAA Division III in the Landmark Conference. Although Elizabethtown College was founded in 1899, it was not until 1928 that the first officially sanctioned intercollegiate athletic contest was held. In April 2013, the college accepted the invitation to join the Landmark Conference, effective July 1, 2014.

=== Men's teams ===
- Baseball started in 1930
- Basketball started in 1928

- NCAA Division III runner-up 2001–2002

- Cross Country started in 1956
- Golf started play in 1965. No seasons were held from 1978 to 1988, but it was reinstated in 1988.
- Lacrosse started in 2002
- Soccer started in 1938

- NAIA co-champion 1959
- NAIA runner-up 1960
- NCAA Division III champions 1989

- Swimming started in 1964
- Tennis started in 1948
- Track and Field started in 1929
- Wrestling started in 1954

- Hosted NCAA Division III Championships in 2015

=== Women's teams ===
- Basketball started play in 1928.

- NCAA Division III National Champion: 1981–82, 1988–89
- NCAA Division III National Runner-Up: 1982–83, 1983–84
- First Division III women's basketball team to 1,000 wins

- Cross country started in 1956.
- Field hockey started play in 1952.

- Hosted NCAA Division III Championship in 1982
- Fourth place finish in 1981

- Lacrosse started play in 2002.
- Soccer started play in 1988.

- Hosted NCAA Division III Championship in 1997

- Softball started play in 1979.
- Swimming
- Track and field was established in 1929, but disappeared quickly. It was reestablished in 1975, but the women's team ended because of a lack of participation in 1981. The team was brought back in 1998, but the college did not begin competing again until 2000.
- Volleyball started in 1978.
- Flag Football to start in 2028.

=== Former sports teams ===
- Football was played for one season in 1928. It was not sanctioned by the college but did play a full intercollegiate schedule.

== Notable alumni ==
- Richard L. Bond '69, former chief executive officer, Tyson Foods
- Carl Bowman '79, a sociologist and author, Bridgewater College, Bridgewater, Virginia
- Nelson Chittum, MLB player
- Nia Dinata, film director
- Mark C. Ebersole '43, former president of Elizabethtown College
- Bill Foster '54, former head coach Duke men's basketball, and 1978 Coach of the Year
- Gene Garber '69, former all-time saves leader for the Atlanta Braves (currently third behind John Smoltz and Craig Kimbrel).
- Mark A. Heckler '77, president, Valparaiso University (2008-2020), dean, University of Colorado School of Arts 1996–2007
- Lois Herr, progressive activist
- David Hickernell '83, state representative, Pennsylvania House of Representatives (2003–present)
- S. Dale High, chairman, High Industries Inc.
- Roscoe Hinkle, sociology professor
- Rosalie Hixson, Paralympic medalist
- Dennis Hollinger, President of Gordon-Conwell Theological Seminary
- Daniel J. Jones '97, lead investigator for The Committee Study of the Central Intelligence Agency's Detention and Interrogation Program, better known as "The Torture Report". Jones is portrayed by Adam Driver in the film The Report.
- Cayla Kluver (attended 2011-2012), author
- Ernest W. Lefever '42, Foreign affairs expert and founder of the Ethics and Public Policy Center, Washington, D.C.
- Mark S. McNaughton '85, former state representative, Pennsylvania House of Representatives (1997-2007)
- Daniel C. Miller, Harrisburg city councilor
- Jeffrey B. Miller, former Pennsylvania state police commissioner
- Kim Powers, contestant, Survivor: Africa (finished in sixth place)
- Skip Roderick '74, former professional soccer player.
- Bruce I. Smith '56, former state representative, Pennsylvania House of Representatives (1981-2007)
- Richard Shaull, Presbyterian theologian
- David Starr (dropped out), original name Max Barsky, professional wrestler
- Jim Tennant, former MLB player.
- Jim Testerman, labor leader
- Mike Tobash, state representative, Pennsylvania House of Representatives (2011–present).
- Charles Walker, nonviolence trainer and civil rights and peace activist.
- Dan Washburn '96, award-winning Shanghai-based writer and journalist.
- Martina White '10, state representative, Pennsylvania House of Representatives.

== Notable faculty and staff ==
- David S. Brown: historian
- David Cullen: guitarist
- Paul Gottfried: writer
- Mark Harman: Germanist
- Donald Kraybill: scholar of Amish studies
- Jeffery D. Long: professor of Religious Studies
- Michael G. Long: author
- W. Wesley McDonald: author
- Steven Nolt: anabaptist groups scholar
- Susan Traverso: president of Thiel College
