= Roscoe Hinkle =

American sociologist (1921–2013)

- Born: Roscoe Conkling Hinkle; March 13, 1921; Union Deposit, Pennsylvania, U.S.
- Died: November 22, 2013 (aged 92)
- Education: Elizabethtown College (BA); University of Minnesota (MA); University of Wisconsin (PhD)
- Occupations: Sociologist; professor
- Spouse: Gisela Mann Hinkle
- Scientific career
- Fields: Sociology

Roscoe Conkling Hinkle (March 13, 1921 – November 22, 2013) was Professor of Sociology at the Ohio State University and a noted analyst of sociological theory with whom many cohorts of graduate students studied theory. He joined the OSU Department of Sociology in 1955 and retired in 1986 as professor emeritus. He was also Professor of Sociology at Temple University during 1964–1970, rejoining the OSU department in 1971.

Hinkle was born in Union Deposit, Pennsylvania, in 1921 and grew up in nearby Hershey. He received the B.A. from Elizabethtown College in 1943. As a conscientious objector during World War II, he volunteered for the Minnesota Semi-Starvation Experiment in 1944–45. He received the M.A. in sociology from the University of Minnesota in 1948, teaching at Indiana University while completing the degree.

While teaching at Indiana University Hinkle met and married Gisela “Gia” Mann Hinkle, who also became a professor in the Ohio State Department of Sociology. They earned their doctorates in Sociology together at the University of Wisconsin, Roscoe receiving the Ph.D. there in 1952.

Hinkle's classificatory-periodizing scheme of American sociological theory, detailed in his Founding Theory of American Sociology, 1881-1915, emphasized that "for theoretical analysis to imply or claim that the history of theory is merely the ideas of 'great figures' arranged in chronological sequence is not merely distortion, but in error".
