= Isaac Newton Harvey Beahm =

Isaac Newton Harvey Beahm (May 14, 1859 – November 11, 1950) was the President of Elizabethtown College, in Elizabethtown, Pennsylvania, USA.

Though president from 1900 until 1901, he did not perform any duties because of illness. He returned as president in 1904 and served until 1909.

New title	President of Elizabethtown College; 1900 - 1901	Succeeded by George Ness Falkenstein
Preceded by Daniel Conrad Reber	President of Elizabethtown College; 1904 - 1909	Succeeded by Daniel Conrad Reber
