= Jim Testerman =

American labor union executive

James P. Testerman
- Education: Elizabethtown College (BS); Millersville University of Pennsylvania (MEd)
- Occupations: Labor union executive, former educator
- Years active: 1985–present
- Organization: National Education Association
- Title: Chief of Operations and Risk Management
- Spouse: Robert Michael Spinazzola II

James P. Testerman is an American labor union executive and former educator who serves as the Chief of Operations and Risk Management for the National Education Association (NEA), the largest labor union in the United States. Previously, he served as the president of the Pennsylvania State Education Association (PSEA) from 2007 to 2011. His career has been noted for his involvement in legal precedents regarding public records transparency and "release time" for union officials.

== Early life and education ==
Testerman attended Elizabethtown College, where he earned a Bachelor of Science in Biology in 1984. He subsequently earned a Master of Education in Counseling from Millersville University of Pennsylvania in 1989. In 1993, he obtained certification as a Quality Schools Trainer from Pennsylvania State University.

== Personal life ==
Testerman is married to Robert Michael Spinazzola II. Testerman lives in Rehoboth Beach, Delaware, with his husband, realtor Robert "Rob" Spinazzola. Testerman and Spinazzola also own a condominium together in the Logan Circle neighborhood of Washington, D.C.

== Labor disputes ==
=== 2024 staff labor dispute ===
Following the strike, management instituted a protective lockout of staff. The dispute caused President Joe Biden to cancel a scheduled address at the NEA Representative Assembly to avoid crossing the picket line.

== Views on public pension policy ==
During his tenure with the National Education Association, Testerman frequently represented the union's position on public pension reform. Participating in panel discussions alongside state legislators and fiscal conservatives, Testerman challenged the prevailing narrative that public pension systems were facing an insurmountable fiscal crisis.

=== Solvency and funding standards ===
In contrast to legislators who described the pension environment following the 2007–2008 financial crisis as "threatening" and "dangerous," Testerman argued that "the sky is not falling." He contended that funding gaps were primarily the result of specific economic downturns in 2002 and 2008 rather than structural failure, noting that investment returns historically restore funding status over time. He emphasized that because approximately two-thirds to 85% of pension revenues are derived from investment returns rather than taxpayer contributions, patience with market recovery is often a more prudent strategy than structural overhaul.

Testerman also generated debate regarding actuarial standards, asserting that the expectation for pension plans to be 100% funded is a "theoretical objective" that may effectively never be reached. He argued that due to market fluctuations, a funding level of roughly 70% is a realistic and acceptable standard for public plans.

=== Defined benefit vs. defined contribution ===
Testerman advocated for the retention of traditional defined benefit (DB) plans over 401(k)-style defined contribution (DC) plans. He argued that DB plans are more cost-effective for taxpayers, citing data suggesting that DB plans can provide the same targeted retirement benefit at a cost 46% lower than DC plans due to economies of scale and professional asset management.

He disputed the argument that younger employees prefer portable DC plans, citing a 2008 vote in West Virginia where 79% of teachers—including 75% of those under age 40—elected to switch from a defined contribution plan back to a defined benefit plan.

=== Economic impact ===
Testerman emphasized the role of public pensions as "automatic stabilizers" for local economies, particularly in rural areas where retirees spend their income in the community. He cited Costilla County, Colorado, where pension payouts accounted for 35% of the county's earned income in 2009. Furthermore, he argued that pensions relieve pressure on state budgets by preventing poverty among the elderly, noting estimates that defined benefit pensions kept 4.7 million households out of poverty, thereby saving $7.3 billion in public assistance costs.

== Career ==
=== Teaching and local leadership ===
Testerman began his career in 1985 as a life science teacher in the Central York School District in York County, Pennsylvania. He taught 7th-grade science and worked in the district's emotional support programs. While serving as a local union officer in 2004, he was cited in the Pittsburgh Post-Gazette regarding the role of gay and lesbian educators in supporting students with identity issues.

=== Pennsylvania State Education Association ===
Testerman rose through the leadership ranks of the Pennsylvania State Education Association (PSEA), serving as Treasurer (1999–2003) and Vice President (2003–2007). He was elected President of the PSEA in 2007, serving until 2011.

As PSEA President, Testerman advocated for the preservation of defined-benefit pensions for teachers during the 2008 financial crisis. He frequently testified before the Pennsylvania General Assembly, opposing the forced consolidation of school districts and calling for a moratorium on the expansion of cyber charter schools due to quality and funding concerns.

==== Campbell v. Central York School District ====
While serving as a PSEA officer, Testerman remained an employee of the Central York School District on "release time," an arrangement where the district paid his salary and pension contributions while the union reimbursed the district. This status allowed him to continue accruing credit in the Public School Employees' Retirement System (PSERS).

In 2009, activist Simon Campbell filed a Right-to-Know Law (RTKL) request for Testerman's W-2 forms to verify the use of public funds for his compensation. The PSEA attempted to block the release, arguing the documents were private. On July 2, 2009, the Pennsylvania Office of Open Records (OOR) ruled in Campbell v. Central York School District that W-2 forms issued by a public agency are public records because they document the expenditure of public funds. The case established a statewide precedent regarding the transparency of union leave arrangements.

=== National Education Association ===
In 2011, Testerman joined the National Education Association (NEA) headquarters in Washington, D.C. He served as Director of Collective Bargaining and later as Senior Director of the Center for Organizing (2012–2021), where he emphasized shifting the union's focus from a service model to an organizing model.

In October 2021, he was appointed Chief of Operations and Risk Management. In this role, he oversees the NEA's operational infrastructure, including human resources and labor relations with NEA staff. His total compensation for the 2023–2024 fiscal year was reported as approximately $317,856.
