= W. Wesley McDonald =

W. Wesley McDonald (June 11, 1946 – September 9, 2014) was a professor of political science at Elizabethtown College.

== Career ==
His most recent and notable work is Russell Kirk and the Age of Ideology, published in 2004. The book explores the political and philosophical ideas of the conservative intellectual (and friend and mentor of McDonald) Russell Kirk and his impact on conservatism in the 1940s and 50s. McDonald has also written several articles on Kirk and 20th-century conservatism.

== Degrees ==
- 1982 Ph.D., Catholic University of America
- 1969 M.A., Bowling Green State University
- 1968 B.A., Towson State University

== Selected works ==
- Russell Kirk and the Age of Ideology, University of Missouri Press 2004 ISBN 0-8262-1512-2
