= Brethren Colleges Abroad =

Non-profitable provider of academic

BCA Study Abroad (founded as Brethren College Abroad) began in 1962 as a non-profit provider of academic, language, and cultural immersion studies for undergraduates from a consortium of colleges and universities.

== Origins ==
BCA was founded in 1962 by Morley J. Mays. In 2002 it moved its central office from North Manchester, Indiana, to Elizabethtown, Pennsylvania.

== Colleges of the Brethren ==
- Bethany Theological Seminary
- Bridgewater College
- Elizabethtown College
- Juniata College
- Manchester University
- McPherson College
- University of LaVerne

== Peace and Justice Lecture Series ==
BCA created a lecture series centered on peace, justice, indigenous rights and the environment. The lecture series ran from 2003 to 2005.

- 2003: Professor Michael McDaniel, Director of the Department of Indigenous Studies, Macquarie University (currently he is Pro Vice-Chancellor of Indigenous Leadership and Engagement and Director of Jumbunna Institute for Indigenous Education and Research at the University of Technology Sydney; Dr. Anita Heiss, indigenous author and activist.
- 2004: Dr. Ferenc Miszlivetz, director of the Institute of Advanced Studies Kőszeg (Hungary) and a Jean Monnet professor.
- 2005: Dr. William Schabas, Professor Emeritus at the Irish Centre for Human Rights at the National University of Ireland, Galway.
