= James Davison Hunter =

American sociologist (born 1955)

James Davison Hunter (born 1955) is an American sociologist and originator of the term "culture war" in his 1991 book Culture Wars: The Struggle to Define America. Hunter is the LaBrosse-Levinson Distinguished Professor of Religion, Culture, and Social Theory at the University of Virginia and the founder and executive director of the university's Institute for Advanced Studies in Culture. He is also a senior fellow at the Trinity Forum.

Hunter is a prominent figure in the sociology of religion and the sociology of culture, as much of his work is dedicated to the study of Evangelicalism and cultural change.

== Education ==
Hunter received his B.A. from Gordon College in 1977, his M.A. from Rutgers University in 1979, and his PhD from Rutgers in 1981.

== Career ==
Hunter began his career at Westmont College as assistant professor of sociology during 1982–1983. He then moved to the University of Virginia, where he taught as assistant professor of sociology from 1983 to 1989. He then became professor of sociology and religious studies from 1989 to 1994. He held the position of William R. Kenan Professor of Sociology and Religious Studies from 1994 until 2003, before becoming LaBrosse-Levinson Distinguished Professor of Religion, Culture, and Sociology Theory with appointments in the department of sociology and the department of religious studies. Since 1995 he has also served as executive director of the university's Institute for Advanced Studies in Culture.

In 2004 the White House nominated Hunter to serve on the National Council of the National Endowment for the Humanities, a position he has held since confirmation by the Senate. He has also served on boards for the Pew Charitable Trusts and the National Commission on Civic Renewal. Since 2011, James D. Hunter has been a member of the board of the Peace Research Endowment. Over the years, his research findings have been presented to audiences on National Public Radio and C-Span, at the National Endowment for the Arts, and at dozens of universities and colleges across the nation including Harvard, Columbia, Vanderbilt, Notre Dame, and the New School for Social Research.

== Publications ==
As of 2018 Hunter had written nine books, edited four books, and published a broad range of articles, essays and reviews - all variously centered around the issue of meaning and moral order in a time of cultural and political change in American life. His authored books include Culture Wars: The Struggle to Define America (1991), which describes a battle for control of American culture and social institutions fought between conservative religious groups (Protestant, Catholic, and Jewish) and their politically progressive counterparts. Another notable publication is To Change the World - the irony, tragedy & possibility of Christianity in the late modern world. He also wrote Science and the Good: The Tragic Quest for the Foundations of Morality (Yale, 2018) which offers a rigorous argument for why efforts to create a scientific basis of morality are neither scientific nor moral.

== Teaching ==
While serving as the LaBrosse-Levinson Distinguished Professor of Religion, Culture, and Social Theory at the University of Virginia, Hunter has taught a variety of courses to both graduate and undergraduate students. His offerings include courses such as "Sociology of Culture," "Modernity/Post-Modernity," "Discourse and Democracy," "Politics and Culture," and "Sociology of Religion," among others.

== Bibliography ==
=== Books ===
- American Evangelicalism: Conservative Religion and the Quandary of Modernity. New Brunswick: Rutgers University Press, 1983. 170 pp. A main selection of the Religious Book Club.
- Cultural Analysis: The Work of Peter Berger, Mary Douglas, Michel Foucault, and Jurgen Habermas. R. Wuthnow, James Davison Hunter, A. Bergesen, and E. Kurzweil. London: Routledge and Kegan Paul, 1984. 272 pp. Translations: Spanish (Barcelona: Ediciones Paidos Iberica, 1988), Portuguese (Buenos Aires: Paidos, 1988) Chinese (Taiwan: Yuan-Liou, 1994), Arabic 2009.
- Evangelicalism: The Coming Generation. Chicago and London: University of Chicago Press, 1987. 302 pp. (Paperback edition, 1988) Winner, 1988 Distinguished Book Award of the Society for the Scientific Study of Religion. Also selected by Choice as one of the outstanding scholarly books of 1987.
- Culture Wars: The Struggle to Define America. New York: Basic Books, 1991. 430 pp. Selected as an alternate in the Book of the Month Club, the History Book Club and the Quality Paperback Book Club. Finalist, 1992 L.A. Times Book Prize; 1992 Critics-Choice Award (Christianity Today); Honorable Mention, Phi Beta Kappa Book Competition.
- Before the Shooting Begins: Searching for Democracy in America's Culture War. New York: Free Press, 1994. 310 pp.
- The Death of Character: Moral Education in an Age without Good or Evil. New York: Basic Books. 2000. 320 pp. Republished in abbreviated form as The Tragedy of Moral Education, 2014.
- Is There a Culture War? A Dialogue on Values and American Public Life. (with Alan Wolfe). Washington, D.C.: The Brookings Press, 2006. 118 pp.
- To Change the World: The Irony, Tragedy, and Possibility of Christianity in the Late-Modern World. New York and Oxford: Oxford University Press, 2010. 368 pp. (Korean translation, 2014; Spanish translation, 2016)
- Science and the Good: The Tragic Quest for the Foundations of Morality. (with Paul Nedelisky). New Haven: Yale University Press, 2018. 289 pp.
- Democracy and Solidarity: On the Cultural Roots of America's Political Crisis. New Haven: Yale University Press, 2024. 504 pp.

=== Edited books ===
- Making Sense of Modern Times: Peter L. Berger and the Vision of Interpretive Sociology. James Davison Hunter and Stephen C. Ainlay, (Editors) London: Routledge and Kegan Paul, 1986. 255 pp.
- Articles of Faith - Articles of Peace: The First Amendment Religion Clauses and the American Public Philosophy. James Davison Hunter and Os Guinness, (Editors) Washington, D.C.: The Brookings Institution, 1990, 178 pp. Winner of the 1991, Gustavus Myers Award for the Study of Human Rights.
- Thrift and Thriving in America: Capitalism and Moral Order from the Puritans to the Present. Joshua Yates and James Davison Hunter, (Editors) New York: Oxford University Press, 2011. 680 pp.
- The Content of Their Character: The Varieties of Moral Formation, James Davison Hunter and Ryan S. Olson (Editors), New York: Finstock & Tew, 2018, 316 pgs.
