= Samuel Hoi =

Hong Kong-born American academic administrator

President of Otis College of Art and Design
- In office 2000–2014

President of Maryland Institute College of Art
- In office July 2014 – December 2023

Personal details
- Born: British Hong Kong (now Hong Kong, China)
- Education: Columbia College, Columbia University, Columbia Law School, Parsons School of Design
- Occupation: Lawyer, academic administrator, college president, illustrator
- Awards: Ordre des Palmes Académiques (2006)

Samuel "Sammy" Hoi is a Hong Kong-born American retired lawyer, academic administrator, and college president. He was the president of Maryland Institute College of Art (MICA) from 2014 until 2023; and the president of Otis College of Art and Design, from 2000 through 2014.

== Education ==
Samuel Hoi was born and raised in British Hong Kong (now Hong Kong, China). His father founded Cathay Arts, a company that specialized in fine traditional Chinese furniture and art objects. As a teenager he immigrated with his family to the U.S..

Hoi attended Columbia College, Columbia University in New York City and graduated summa cum laude and Phi Beta Kappa, with a B.A. degree in French and psychology. He earned a J.D. degree from Columbia Law School and became a member of the New York State Bar (which is no longer active). Shortly thereafter, he entered Parsons School of Design and received an A.A.S. degree in illustration.

== Career ==
Hoi is an advocate for art and design education and creative professionals in social, economic, and cultural advancement. At Otis, he has shepherded new academic initiatives involving innovative partnerships and community engagement, such as the Otis Integrated Learning Program. Since 2007, Otis commissioned the annual Otis Report on the Creative Economy of the Los Angeles Region.

Prior to joining Otis, Hoi served as director of Parsons Paris, the Paris campus of Parsons School of Design. He was then dean of the Corcoran College of Art and Design in Washington, D.C.. While at the Corcoran, Hoi created the Visual Arts Community Outreach Program, serving the inner-city youth of Washington, D.C. from 1991 to 2000. The program received a National Multicultural Institute Award and a Coming Up Taller Award from the President's Committee on Arts and Humanities.

He has juried numerous exhibitions and served on panels for the National Endowment for the Arts, Ford Foundation, Pew Center for Arts & Heritage, Surdna Foundation, Wallace Foundation, the DC Commission on Art and Humanities, and the California Community Foundation.

Hoi has served on boards for many organizations, including the National Association of Schools of Art and Design (NASAD), the Arena Stage, Arts and Humanities Education Collaborative, Inc., Washington Lawyers for the Arts, and the Alliance for Young Artists and Writers, Inc. From 2004 to 2009, he chaired the board of the Association of Independent Colleges of Art and Design (AICAD). Currently, he is chair of the board of United States Artists (USA), serves on the board of The James Irvine Foundation, and is a member of the Los Angeles Coalition for the Economy and Jobs. He also serves on the National Advisory Board of the Strategic National Arts Alumni Project (SNAAP).

Hoi was the president of the Maryland Institute College of Art for 9 years, starting on July 1, 2014. In September 2020 during the COVID-19 pandemic, the full-time faculty at MICA declared a vote of no confidence in the senior leadership, including Hoi, citing "inadequate and chaotic operation of the current administration". Hoi announced that he would retire, with an intention to step down at the end of December 2023.

== Awards and honors ==
Hoi holds an honorary doctorate from the Corcoran School of the Arts and Design. In 2006, and was decorated by the French government as an Officer of the Ordre des Palmes Académiques. In addition, he is a recipient of the City of Angels Award from the LAX Coastal Chamber of Commerce and the Artistic License Award from California Lawyers for the Arts.

== Personal life ==
Hoi's preference for cowboy boots developed when he was finishing up at Columbia University. Already interested in dress as a way of visibly meshing a multicultural background, he decided that cowboy boots were an ideal fit in more ways than one. They were comfortable and suitable to his long stride and natural rhythm while versatile enough to wear with anything from jeans to suits. When people noticed his boots, he was pleased; not only did the boots reinforce his desire to be more individualistic, "they were a symbolic indication of my enrichment, the boot being something of the West and also a foreshadowing of my coming to Los Angeles."
