= Ralph Weist Schlosser =

Ralph Weist Schlosser is an American academic, a former professor and president of Elizabethtown College.

Schlosser served as president of Elizabethtown College from 1928 until 1941.

He was a member of the Elizabethtown Rotary Club, serving as president during the 1938–39 year. He was the district governor for Rotary District 7390 in 1947.

Schlosser residence hall is an all-female dormitory and is named after his wife. Schlosser residence hall was integrated in 2012, and now houses both males and females. Schlosser residence is also the home to the Engineering and Honors Living Learning Communities, as well as first-year students in the Momentum Society.
