= Russ Bixler =

Russell Bixler
- Born: April 24, 1927; Boston, Massachusetts, U.S.
- Died: January 30, 2000 (aged 72)
- Education: Western Maryland College, B.A.; Bridgewater College, M.A.; Bethany Theological Seminary, M.Div.; Duquesne University; Pittsburgh Theological Seminary
- Occupation(s): Teleevangelist, Author, Founder and CEO of Cornerstone Television, Inc.
- Spouse: Norma Bowman Bixler

R. Russell "Russ" Bixler, April 24, 1927 – January 30, 2000 (aged 72), was the founder, chairman of the board, and chief executive officer of Cornerstone Television, Inc. He was also a well-known preacher, author, and charismatic leader.

== Early life ==
Bixler was born in Boston, Massachusetts, in 1927 and attended public schools in Maryland. His higher education included studies at Western Maryland College and Bridgewater College, Virginia, where he received his Bachelor of Arts in 1947; Bethany Theological Seminary in Chicago, where he received a M.Div. in 1959; Duquesne University in Pittsburgh; and Pittsburgh Theological Seminary. One year of Bixler's college years was spent in the U.S. Navy.

== Religious career ==
Following seminary, Bixler became pastor of the Pittsburgh Church of the Brethren and completed thirteen years there as pastor before resigning in 1972. He continued his status as an ordained minister in the Church of the Brethren.

As a charismatic leader in the religious community, Bixler served for twenty years as the Chairman of the Planning Committee of the annual five-day Greater Pittsburgh Charismatic Conference. He has written for nine Christian publishers; his first book, It Can Happen to Anybody, was published in 1970 by Whitaker House, and it has sold more than 160,000 copies in English and German.

Bixler is perhaps most known for his foundational work with Cornerstone Television, which includes WPCB-TV, Channel 40 of Pittsburgh, and WKBS-TV, Channel 47 of Altoona, Pennsylvania, both of which broadcast twenty-four hours a day across North America by two satellites. Bixler was a member of the board of directors of the National Religious Broadcasters and was chairman of its TV Committee from 1983 to 1984. WPCB-TV was the 1998 & 1989 recipient of the NRB’s award for Broadcast Facility of the Year for television.

Bixler has been listed in Who's Who in the East, Who's Who in Religion, Who's Who in Entertainment, and Who's Who in the Media.
