= D. Elton Trueblood =

American theologian

David Elton Trueblood (December 12, 1900 – December 20, 1994), who was usually known as "Elton Trueblood" or "D. Elton Trueblood", was a noted 20th-century American Quaker author and theologian, former chaplain both to Harvard and Stanford universities.

== Early life and education ==
Elton Trueblood was born December 12, 1900, in Iowa, the fourth of five children, and was graduated from William Penn College in Iowa in 1922. He did graduate study at Brown University, Hartford Seminary, and Harvard University before finishing his PhD at Johns Hopkins University in Philosophy.

== Career ==
During his career, Trueblood held faculty and chaplain positions at Haverford College, Guilford College, Harvard University, Stanford University, and Earlham College. He then settled in the Quaker community of Richmond, Indiana, intending to help spur the growth of Earlham College from a small regional religious school into a nationally recognized institution of higher learning. He was a founder of the Earlham School of Religion, a Quaker seminary in Richmond, and contributed to a renaissance of American Quaker thought and action spurred on partly by the common experiences of Quaker intellectuals as conscientious objectors during World War II (Trueblood gained recognition and even approval of his "vocational pacifism" by the likes of Reinhold Niebuhr). He actively sought to mentor younger Quakers into his nineties. Trueblood also founded the Yokefellow movement and supported Stephen Ministries. His Yokefellow funders included some of his past students, such as planned community developer Charles Samuel Coble, whom Trueblood taught and also coached in track in the late 1920s at Guilford College.

In the 1950s, he served as a senior advisor to President Dwight D. Eisenhower, who created a post for him as Chief of Religious Information of at the U.S. Information Agency (which included oversight of the Voice of America). Time magazine profiled him in this role on March 15, 1954. Trueblood was primarily hired because of his 1951 book, The Life We Prize, which laid out a systematic philosophy of America's civil religion. He heavily promoted the propaganda narrative abroad that the United States was a religious nation, highlighting the surge of religious fervor during the 1950s. For Trueblood, the American Way of Life (democracy, freedom, equality, etc.) were only made possible because all American citizens believed that human beings were made "in the Image of God."

During the Nixon Administration he again served as an adviser to the President. He was a political conservative who supported Nixon's foreign policy, including the Vietnam War, and gave the invocation at the 1972 Republican National Convention. Nonetheless, he was known for maintaining an internationalist perspective, serving for many years as the permanent representative from the global Quaker community to the World Council of Churches, an organization he helped bring into being.

== Publications ==
Elton Trueblood wrote 33 books, including: The Predicament of Modern Man, The Life We Prize, Alternative to Futility, Foundations for Reconstruction, Signs of Hope, The Logic of Belief, Philosophy of Religion, Robert Barclay, Abraham Lincoln: Theologian of American Anguish, The Idea of a College, The People Called Quakers, The Incendiary Fellowship, The Trustworthiness of Religious Experience (1939 Swarthmore Lecture), A Place to Stand, Your Other Vocation and The Humor of Christ.

Trueblood's short book, The Predicament of Modern Man, received much attention near the end of World War II for the way it addressed a widespread interest in finding spiritual meaning and morality in the face of such extreme suffering during World War II. In the book he asserted that searching for morality without a foundation in religion was a futile effort, and coined the term "cut-flower civilization":

The terrible danger of our time consists in the fact that ours is a cut-flower civilization. Beautiful as cut flowers may be, and much as we may use our ingenuity to keep them looking fresh for a while, they will eventually die, and they die because they are severed from their sustaining roots. We are trying to maintain the dignity of the individual apart from the deep faith that every man is made in God's image and is therefore precious in God's eyes.

Elton wrote a shorter version of this basic thesis for Reader's Digest, which generated volumes of mail; he reportedly responded to every letter. The book received favorable reviews from the likes of Reinhold Niebuhr and Norman Vincent Peale. Jewish sociologist Will Herberg later used Trueblood's concept of a "cut-flower" culture in his 1951 book, Judaism and Modern Man.

Some reviewers have considered Trueblood's books, especially The Logic of Belief and Philosophy of Religion, among his most rigorous intellectual contributions to the field of philosophy of religion.

Trueblood's book on Abraham Lincoln caught the attention of Nancy Reagan, who talked about it in an interview with Good Housekeeping in September 1981. It was reissued in 2012 by Phoenix Press with the title Abraham Lincoln: A Spiritual Biography .

Trueblood told several students and reviewers that he sought to provide the general audience with many readable works to promote a depth of religious thought among his readers. One of his final books was an autobiography titled While it is Day, which traced his personal journey from boyhood in Iowa and placed his personal history in the context of the history of his family's long connection with Quakerism.

== Friend of Presidents ==
Trueblood became a lifetime friend of President Herbert Hoover, who was also a Quaker. They first met when Elton was the chaplain and a faculty member at Stanford University and Hoover had retired to Palo Alto, California. They lived near each other and eventually struck up a friendship that lasted for decades. When Hoover died in 1964 while Trueblood was traveling in southeast Asia, the State Department flew Trueblood back to the United States to perform the funeral service at the request of Hoover's family.

Trueblood was also friends with Presidents Dwight D. Eisenhower, Lyndon B. Johnson, Richard Nixon and Ronald Reagan.

== Family and retirement ==
He had four children (Martin, Arnold, Sam and Elizabeth) with his first wife, Pauline, who died in 1955. Trueblood was remarried in 1956 to Virginia Zuttermeister in ceremonies held at the Washington National Cathedral.

Trueblood retired from Earlham College in 1966, but lived in Richmond, Indiana, for nearly the rest of his life. For many years he also maintained a summer home on Lake Paupac (41°19′28″N 75°15′26″W), a Quaker retreat in the Pocono Mountains near Greentown, PA. He continued to write books and give public speeches in retirement. Trueblood died on December 20, 1994. His obituary was featured in The New York Times. His cremains are interred at his study, Teague Library, on the campus of Earlham College.
