= Paul Sniegowski =

College President

21st President of Earlham College
- Incumbent
- Assumed office August 1, 2024
- Preceded by: Anne Houtman

Personal details
- Spouse: Gail Kienitz
- Children: 2
- Education: Indiana University Bloomington (BFA, MA); University of Chicago (PhD)
- Scientific career
- Fields: Biological mutations Evolutionary biology
- Institutions: University of Pennsylvania; Earlham College
- Doctoral advisor: Brian Charlesworth
- Other academic advisors: Richard E. Lenski (postdoctoral advisor)

Paul D. Sniegowski is a Professor of Biology and the President of Earlham College. He was previously a Professor of Biology and the Dean of the College of Arts and Sciences at the University of Pennsylvania.

== Education ==
Sniegowski received his undergraduate degree in Violin Performance from Indiana University School of Music in 1982. After a stint as a professional violinist, he obtained a master's degree in biology in 1988 from Indiana University Bloomington with a focus on animal behavior. Sniegowski received his Ph.D. in 1993 from the University of Chicago, where he worked on evolutionary genetics with Brian Charlesworth. He did postdoctoral research at Michigan State University with Richard Lenski, studying the evolution of mutation rates in bacteria.

== Career ==
Sniegowski joined the Department of Biology at the University of Pennsylvania in 1997, rising through the faculty ranks and being promoted to full professor in 2013. In 2017, he was named the Stephen A. Levin Family Dean of the College of Arts and Sciences, overseeing the undergraduate curricula among other activities. Sniegowski's dissertation research focused on the evolutionary dynamics of transposable elements in Drosophila melanogaster. His postdoctoral research included examination of the directed-mutation hypothesis as well as the discovery that elevated mutation rates had evolved in several populations in the Long-Term Evolution Experiment with E. coli. As a faculty member at Penn, Sniegowski continued to study the evolution of mutation rates, with a particular focus on the tension between the cost of deleterious mutations and the benefit of increased evolvability. On August 1, 2024, Sniegowski became the 21st President of Earlham College.

== Honors ==
Sniegowski was a Keeley Visiting Fellow at Wadham College, Oxford University, in 2002. He received an Excellence in Teaching Award from the Department of Biology, and subsequently the Ira H. Abrams Award for Distinguished Teaching from the College of Arts and Sciences at the University of Pennsylvania. In 2024, he was named the President of Earlham College and the Earlham School of Religion.
