= Bethany Theological Seminary =

Bible school in Richmond, Indiana, U.S.

- Seal of Bethany Theological Seminary, depicting its motto
- Former names: Bethany Bible School and Bethany Biblical Seminary
- Motto: Empowering Christian Leaders
- Type: Private, graduate seminary
- Established: 1905
- Accreditation: ATS, HLC
- Religious affiliation: Church of the Brethren
- Academic affiliations: Susquehanna Valley Ministry Center, Earlham School of Religion
- President: Jeff Carter
- Dean: Steven Schweitzer
- Faculty: 10
- Students: 100
- Location: Richmond, Indiana, United States; 39.8263°N 84.9106°W
- Campus: Urban
- Website: www.bethanyseminary.edu

Bethany Theological Seminary is the a seminary of the Church of the Brethren in Richmond, Indiana. It is accredited by the Association of Theological Schools in the United States and Canada and the Higher Learning Commission.

== History ==
The seminary was founded in 1905 as Bethany Biblical Seminary by A.C. Wieand and E. B. Hoff. While the two were traveling in the Holy Land overlooking the village of Bethany from the Mount of Olives in 1901–02, they decided to name the new Bible institute Bethany. Bethany moved from Chicago's inner city to a new campus in Oak Brook, Il. in 1964. In 1994, the seminary moved from Oak Brook, Illinois, to Richmond, Indiana, to form a partnership with the Earlham School of Religion, a Christian theological school in the Quaker tradition.

== Academics ==
Bethany offers students opportunities for a degree in ministry in the form of Master of Divinity and one in research through the Master of Arts degree. Students can further refine their field of study through a degree emphasis in Peace Studies or Ministry With Youth and Young Adults. Peace-related courses cover topics ranging from non-violence and the biblical story, to peace witness in the Anabaptist/Pietist tradition, to mediating conflict in families and churches, to peacemaking in national and international arenas. Master of Divinity students pursuing a degree emphasis in Ministry With Youth and Young Adults complete a practicum experience, and Master of Arts students focus their thesis on youth and young adult ministry.

Bethany emphasizes peace, service, simple living, and the importance of the faith community. Along with the Quakers and Mennonites, the Church of the Brethren is an historic peace church, conscientiously opposed to all war, and intentional about working with peacemaking and reconciliation concerns. Several Bethany professionals and graduates are also associated with a renewed interest in theopoetics.

Students in either the Master of Divinity or Master of Arts programs can enroll as residential or Connections students. Connections is designed for persons who cannot relocate to Richmond, and who can commit to taking a mix of classes online, offsite, and on campus as weekend or two-week intensives. One of the primary locations for off-site Bethany courses is the Susquehanna Valley Ministry Center, on the campus of Elizabethtown College in Elizabethtown, Pennsylvania.

Bethany partners with a wide circle of theological schools to further enhance graduate-level educational opportunities. These schools include Christian Theological Seminary in Indianapolis, IN; Payne Theological Seminary in Yellow Springs, OH; United Theological Seminary in Dayton, OH; and The University of Dayton Graduate School in Dayton, Ohio.

== Notable alumni ==
- Russ Bixler – author and co-founder of Cornerstone Television
- Kenneth Brown (academic)
- Vernard Eller – author and Christian pacifist
- Kenneth B. Smith – founder of Trinity United Church of Christ in Chicago, and former president of Chicago Theological Seminary.
- Gary Wilde – writer and editor
