= Vernard Eller =

American pastor and academic, coiner of the term "Christian anarchy"

Vernard Marion Eller
- Born: July 11, 1927; Everett, Washington, U.S.
- Died: June 18, 2007 (aged 79); La Verne, California, U.S.
- Education: Theologian
- Occupation: Professor
- Writing career
- Subjects: Christian anarchism, Christian pacifism, Christian radicalism, Simple living, Apocalypse
- Website: www.hccentral.com/eller1/

Vernard Marion Eller (July 11, 1927 – June 18, 2007) was an American author, Christian pacifist and minister in the Church of the Brethren. Born in Everett, Washington, and raised in Wenatchee, Eller graduated from the University of La Verne and Bethany Theological Seminary, then earned a master's degree from Northwestern University and a doctorate from Pacific School of Religion. He was professor of philosophy and religion at the University of La Verne for thirty-four years. He wrote over 20 books including The Mad Morality and Christian Anarchy: Jesus' Primacy Over the Powers. He died of Alzheimer's disease on June 18, 2007.

== Bibliography ==
In addition to several essays, reviews, and monographs, Eller's publications include:

- A Protestant's Protestant: Kierkegaard from a New Perspective (1964), republished as Kierkegaard and Radical Discipleship: a New Perspective (1968)
- His End Up: Getting God into the New Theology (1969) ISBN 0-687-17060-5
- The Mad Morality: Or, the Ten Commandments Revisited (1970) ISBN 0-687-22899-9
- The Promise: Ethics in the Kingdom of God (1970)
- The Sex Manual for Puritans (1971) ISBN 0-687-38309-9
- In Place of Sacraments: A Study of Baptism and the Lord's Supper (1972) ISBN 0-8028-1476-X
- King Jesus' Manual of Arms for the Armless: War and Peace from Genesis to Revelation (1973) ISBN 0-687-20885-8
- The Simple Life: The Christian Stance Toward Possessions (1973) ISBN 0-8028-1537-5
- The Most Revealing Book of the Bible: Making Sense out of Revelation (1974) ISBN 0-8028-1572-3
- The Time So Urgent: A Play or The Time So Urgent: A Chancel Drama: The Story of Alexander Mack and the Founding of the Brethren (Schwarzenau, Germany, 1708) (1974)
- Cleaning Up the Christian Vocabulary (1976) ISBN 0-87178-153-0
- Thy Kingdom Come: A Blumhardt Reader (1980) ISBN 0-8028-3544-9
- The Language of Canaan and the Grammar of Feminism (1982) ISBN 0-8028-1902-8
- Pearl of Christian Counsel for the Brokenhearted (1983, with Rosanna Eller McFadden) ISBN 0-8191-2851-1
- Towering Babble: God's People Without God's Word (1983) ISBN 0-87178-855-1
- The Beloved Disciple: His Name, His Story, His Thought: Two Studies from the Gospel of John (1987) ISBN 0-8028-0275-3
- Christian Anarchy: Jesus' Primacy Over the Powers (1987) ISBN 1-57910-222-0 Complete e-text.
- Proclaim Good Tidings: Evangelism for the Faith Community (1987) ISBN 0-87178-487-4
- Eller's Ethical Elucidations: Collected Readings on Christian Ethics (1970–89) (1989)
- The Outward Bound: Caravaning as the Style of the Church (2003) ISBN 1-59244-294-3
- War and Peace: From Genesis to Revelation (2003) ISBN 1-59244-233-1
