= Gary Wilde =

American writer and priest

Gary Allen Wilde (born 1952) is an American religious author and an Episcopal priest for the Diocese of Georgia. He is also the senior editor for the Christian magazine The Quiet Hour published by David C. Cook Publishing Co.

== History ==
Raised in Florida, Wilde moved to Illinois in 1971, where he attended Trinity College in Deerfield, receiving his A.A. degree. From there he went on to Moody Bible Institute in Chicago and received his B.A. degree in pastoral training and Greek. From 1975 to 1978 he served as associate pastor at Irving Park Free Methodist Church, in suburban Chicago, then from 1978 to 1985 as senior pastor of St. Charles Free Methodist Church in St. Charles. During that time Wilde also attended graduate school at Wheaton College in Wheaton, taking courses in educational ministry, then got his M.Div. degree from Bethany Theological Seminary.

== Writer and Editor ==
In 1986 Wilde wrote a short series of biblical commentaries, thus starting his career as a writer. By 1988 Wilde had become an instructor in the Religion/Humanities Department at Elgin Community College, a position he held until 1991. He also became the Books and Curriculum Editor for the David C. Cook Publishing Company in Elgin. In 1990 he developed his own company, Wilde Creative Services, and began contracting himself out as an author/editor. Between 1990 and 2005, working as a freelancer Wilde wrote, collaborated, and edited books, articles, and education materials for different Christian publishers. He is the creator of the Bible Wisdom series, the Encouragers for Men series for Victor Books and author-compiler of the 15 books in the Promises to Treasure series for Broadman & Holman.

== Anglican ==
By 1988 Wilde had left the Free Methodist Church and started attending services in the Episcopal Diocese of Chicago. In late 1997 Wilde moved back to the Orlando suburb of Oviedo, and began going to the Cathedral Church of St. Luke. There he held various positions, including working with men's ministry and the cathedral's Dean's Hour study groups.

From 2005 to 2006 Wilde attended Nashotah House seminary, in Nashotah, WI, taking the school's Anglican Studies Program, in preparation for the diaconate. On May 27, 2006, Wilde was ordained a deacon in the Episcopal Diocese of Central Florida. In June he accepted a position as vicar of St. John's Episcopal Church, Moultrie, Georgia, in the Episcopal Diocese of Georgia. On December 13, 2006, Wilde was ordained a priest by the Rt. Rev. Henry I. Louttit, Jr., and was installed as rector at St. John's.

Wilde is an Anglo-Catholic priest and is inspired by John Mason Neale.

== Family ==
Since 1973 Wilde has been married to Carol McLean Wilde. They have several children.

== Bibliography ==
- Philippians: Joy in the Lord (1986)
- Old Testament Royalty: History of a Nation (1986)
- The Sermon on the Mount: Wisdom of the Kingdom (1986)
- Ephesians: Life in the Church (1986)
- Acts: Powered by the Spirit (1986)
- First & Second Thessalonians: Hope of His Coming (1986)
- Your Ministry of Prayer (1990)
- Dealing with Death (1991)
- Free from the Past: God's Promise for Adult Children of Alcoholics (1992)
- The Bible Wisdom series (1993-1995)
- Wisdom for Grandparents: Practical Bible-Based Principles (1995)
- Be Skillful Leader's Guide (1995)
- The Encouragers for Men series (1996-1998)
- The Bedside Book of Prayer (1997)
- The Power of Prayer (1998)
- The Promise of Faith (1998)
- The Promises to Treasure series (1998-1999)
- Bible Promises for Champions (2000)
- All Preachers Great and Small (2000)
- Maxed Out: How Old Testament Personalities Handled the Stress (2000)
- Prayers for Good Times and Bad (2001)
- Life-Changing Prayers: Discover the Power of Prayer (2002)
- Christian Family Guide to Starting Your Own Business (2003)
- Christ-Based Leadership: Applying the Bible and Today's Best Leadership Models to Become an Effective Leader (2005)

== See also ==
- Moultrie, Georgia
- St. Mark's Anglican Church (Moultrie, Georgia)
- Anglo-Catholic
- Episcopal Church in the United States of America
- Episcopal Diocese of Georgia
