= Kenneth B. Smith =

American clergyman & community leader (1931-2008)

The Reverend Kenneth Bryant Smith Sr.
- The Rev. Kenneth B. Smith Sr.

President of the Chicago Theological Seminary
- In office 1984–1999

President of the Chicago Board of Education
- In office 1979–1982

Personal details
- Born: February 19, 1931 Montclair, New Jersey, United States
- Died: January 21, 2008 (aged 76)
- Education: Virginia Union University; Drew University
- Occupation: Clergyman & community leader

Kenneth Bryant Smith Sr. (February 19, 1931 – January 21, 2008) was a Chicago-area community leader and minister.

Smith was born in Montclair, New Jersey and raised as a Catholic. After earning a bachelor's degree at Virginia Union University in 1953 and a master's degree from Drew University in 1954, he came to Chicago in the late 1950s to attend Bethany Theological Seminary, then located outside the city. He was ordained by the United Church of Christ and began his career as an associate pastor at the Congregational Church of Park Manor. From there, he founded the Trinity United Church of Christ, before pastoring long-term at Church of the Good Shepherd in Washington Park.

From 1979 to 1982, he was a member of the Chicago Board of Education. On May 16, 1980, only eight months after he joined the board, the members of the board elected him to a one-year term as the board's president. He was the first black person to hold the office since it was created in 1840. Smith ultimately declined to seek reelection by the board to its presidency in 1981.

From 1984 to 1999 he served as president of Chicago Theological Seminary.

In 1996, he received the Chicago History Museum "Making History Award" for Distinction in Public Service.

== Sources ==
- http://www.chicagotribune.com/news/local/chi-hed_ksmithjan23,1,197927.story?ctrack=1&cset=true
- http://www.isfbank.com/kenneth_smith.html
- https://web.archive.org/web/20120211113126/http://www.wideopenthinking.org/?p=111
- Speller, Julia (2005). Walkin' the Talk: Keepin the Faith in Afrocentric Congregations, Pilgrim Press.
- Susan B. Thistlethwaite (2008), "Remembering Ken Smith." Wide Open Thinking. Chicago Theological Seminary. https://web.archive.org/web/20120211113126/http://www.wideopenthinking.org/?p=111
