= United Andean Indian Mission =

US-based Protestant Christian mission

The United Andean Indian Mission (UAIM) was an ecumenical and interdenominational Protestant mission, formed in the United States in 1946 with the purpose of working among the indigenous peoples in Ecuador, South America. The UAIM was created under the sponsorship of the Committee on Cooperation in Latin America, a multi-denominational agency that served as an umbrella organisation for all liberal Protestant missions in the region.

The constituent churches and denominations of the UAIM were: the Presbyterian Church in the United States (Southern), the United Presbyterian Church in the United States of America (Northern), the Evangelical and Reformed Church, and the Evangelical United Brethren Church. Prominent missionaries working for the UAIM were, among others, Paul Streich, Benjamin Gutiérrez and Eugene Braun.

== Early history ==
The first missionary field for the UAIM was Picalquí, in Pichincha, Ecuador, where the mission bought a farm to train the amerindian people living there in agricultural techniques. The mission also operated a small medical mission with the help of American physicians already living in the country. Later on, the mission expanded to other places, but it never gained a strong presence in Ecuador. When the mission disbanded (due to disagreements among its missionaries and also because of the strong anti-American feelings among Ecuadorian church leaders), it had few congregations.

In 1965, its congregations and parishes merged with those planted by missionaries of the Church of the Brethren, to form the United Evangelical Church of Ecuador (Iglesia Evangélica Unida del Ecuador or IEUE), which changed in 1999 its name to United Evangelical Methodist Church of Ecuador.

The United Church's first president was Rev. Gonzalo Carvajal, who resigned to work for HCJB and the Presbyterian Church in America (PCA). Since the denomination adopted a Methodist identity, it has an episcopal structure. The current presiding bishop is Silvio Cevallos Parra.

== Merger ==
At the time of the merger, the participating churches in the UAIM were: the United Methodist Church, the Presbyterian Church (U.S.A.), the United Church of Christ and the Disciples of Christ (the last two through their joint "Global Ministries").

The United Andean Indian Mission was one of the founding missions of the Ecuadorian Evangelical Fellowship (Confraternidad Evangélica Ecuatoriana), along with the Church of the Brethren, the Christian and Missionary Alliance, Avant Ministries (formerly Gospel Missionary Union), the Evangelical Covenant Church, the Missionary Church, World Mission Prayer League, Norwegian Santal Mission, Christian Missions in Many Lands (Plymouth Brethren), HCJB, and many smaller missions and churches.

== Sources and further reading ==
- Sunquist, W. Scott and Becker, Caroline N., A History of Presbyterian Missions: 1944–2007, Geneva Press, 2008.
- The United Andean-Indian Mission Becomes a Reality, Board of International Missions, Evangelical and Reformed Church, 1946.
- Padilla, Washington, La Iglesia y los Dioses Modernos. Historia del protestantismo en el Ecuador, Corporación Editora Nacional, Quito, 2nd Edition, 2008.
- Horton, Douglas, The United Church of Christ: Its Origins, Organization, and Role in the World Today, Thomas Nelson Publishers, 1962.
- Anderson, Justice C., An Evangelical Saga, Xulon Press, 2005
- Damboriena, Prudencio, Protestantismo en América Latina, 1957.
- Miller, Park Hays, Why I Am a Presbyterian, Read Books, 2007.
