= Earlham School of Religion =

Quaker graduate seminary in Richmond, Indiana

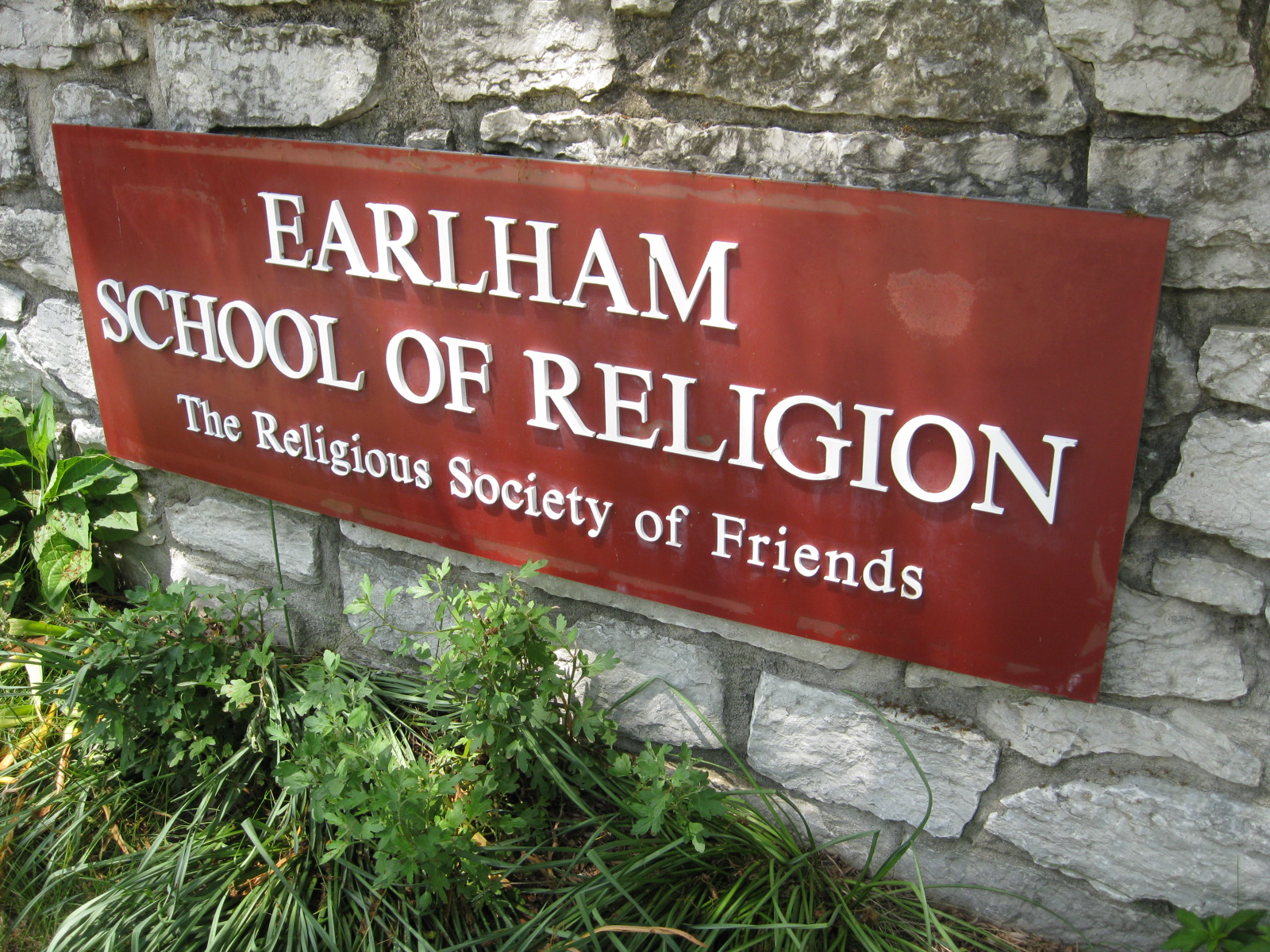
- Motto: Spiritual Formation. Academic Rigor. Creative Ministry.
- Type: Private, graduate seminary
- Established: 1960
- Affiliations: Quakers
- Academic affiliations: Association of Theological Schools in the United States and Canada, North Central Association, Bethany Theological Seminary
- President: Anne M. Houtman
- Dean: Gretchen Castle
- Academic staff: 9
- Students: c. 100
- Location: Richmond, Indiana, U.S. 39.8263°N 84.9101°W
- Campus: Urban
- Website: esr.earlham.edu

Earlham School of Religion (ESR), a graduate division of Earlham College, located in Richmond, Indiana, is the oldest graduate seminary associated with the Religious Society of Friends (Quakers).

== History ==
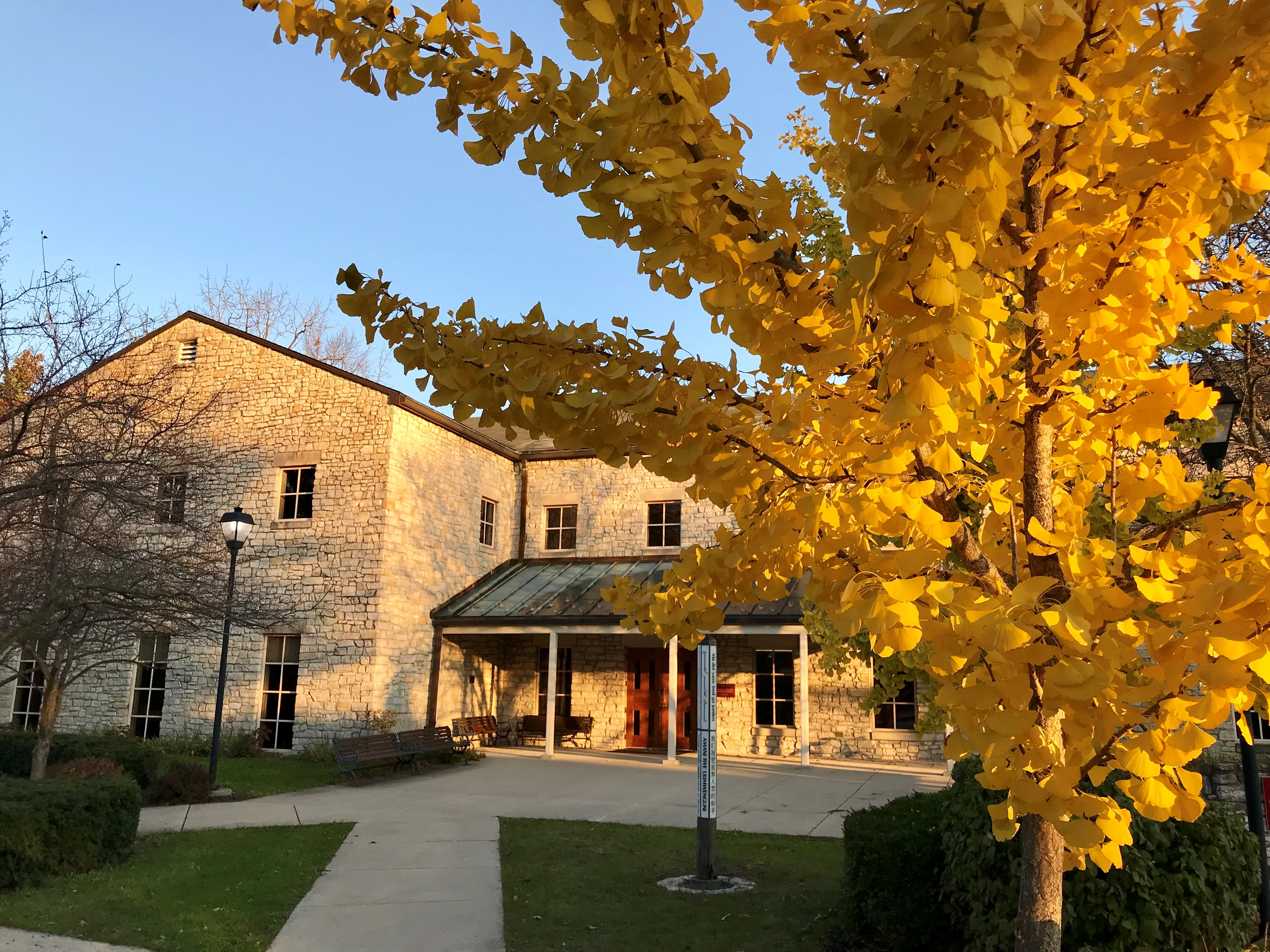
Earlham School of Religion's Classroom and Community Building includes space for worship, classes, the school's dining hall, and computing and student services.

ESR was founded in 1960 by Wilmer Cooper, D. Elton Trueblood and others for the training of Quaker ministers. Earlham School of Religion was opened on an experimental basis by Earlham College in the autumn of 1960. An M.A. in Religion was offered for the first two years. Then, the Board of Trustees authorized the expansion of the program to include a three-year Bachelor of Divinity degree. The B. Div. is now called either the Master of Ministry degree, a name many Quakers prefer, or the Master of Divinity degree, preferred by some who wish the name to correspond to that of other seminaries.

Earlham School of Religion was accredited in 1969 by the Association of Theological Schools in the United States and Canada (ATS) and by the North Central Association through affiliation with Earlham College.

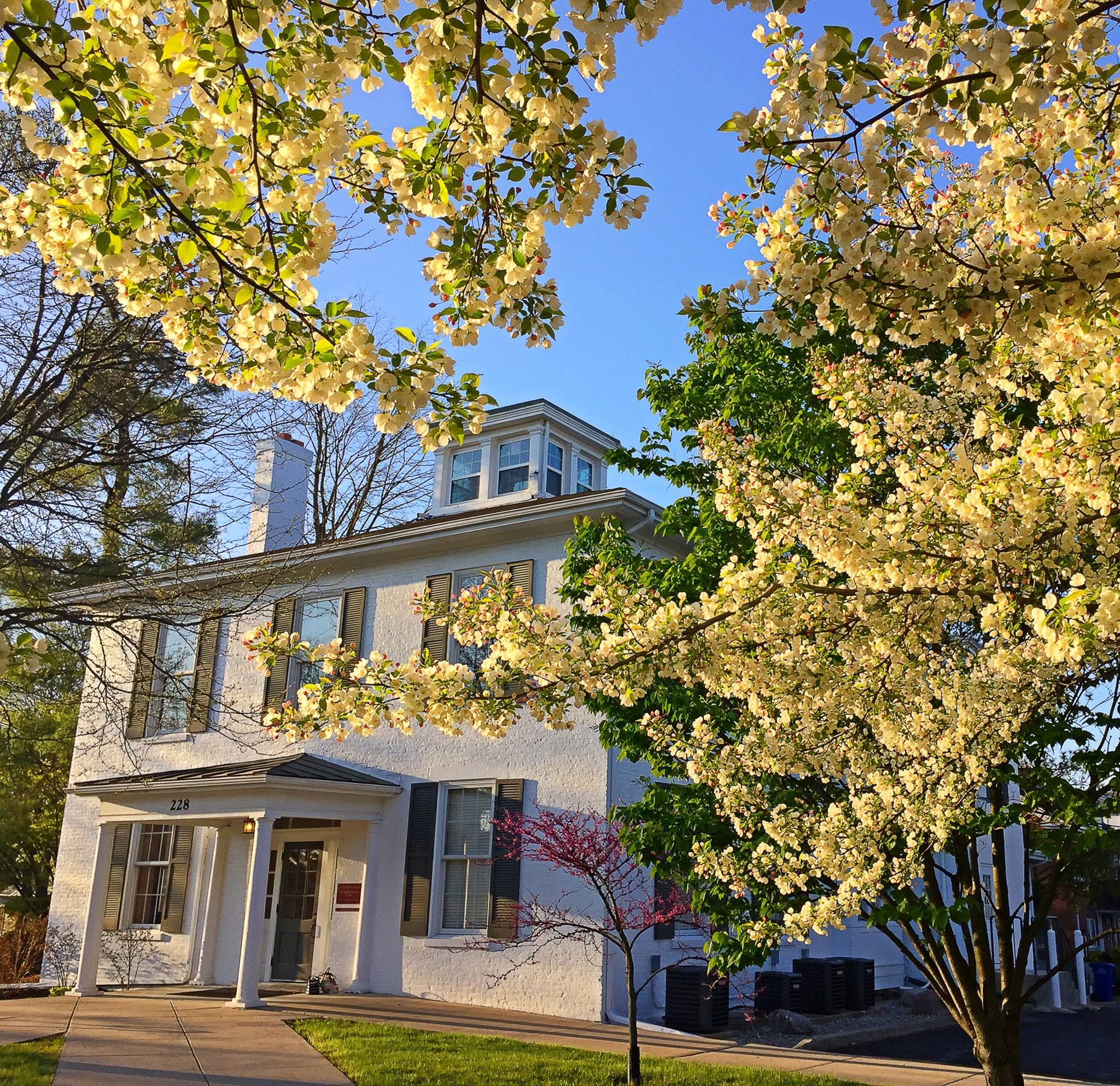
The Barclay Center at Earlham School of Religion houses the school's administrative and faculty offices.

In 1994, Bethany Theological Seminary, affiliated with the Church of the Brethren, relocated to Richmond, Indiana, from Oak Brook, Illinois, and entered into a partnership with Earlham School of Religion. The schools remain independent but coordinate curriculum through a jointly operated Academic Services office, and they operate a combined computer network through Seminary Computing Services.

In 2010, Earlham School of Religion celebrated its 50th anniversary. In 2014, 2015, 2016, 2017, 2018, 2019, and 2020 ESR was designated as one of the "Seminaries that Change the World" by The Center for Faith and Service.

== Current programs ==
Today Earlham School of Religion grants the Master of Divinity or Master of Ministry degree with emphases in Christian Spirituality, Pastoral Care, Pastoral Ministry, Peace and Justice, Quaker Ministry, Teaching, Entrepreneurial Ministry, and Writing as Ministry. ESR also offers a Master of Arts in Religious Studies degree with four areas of concentration: Biblical Studies, Christian Theology, Quaker Studies, and Peace and Justice Studies. In fall 2019, ESR launched a jointly offered Master of Arts: Theopoetics and Writing degree with its partner school, Bethany Theological Seminary. In fall 2020, ESR launched a Master of Arts in Peace and Social Transformation degree. In addition, students can enroll in Certificate programs in Quaker Studies, Spirituality, Quaker Spirituality, Spirituality in a Multifaith World, Entrepreneurial Ministry, Bivocational Ministry, and Writing as Ministry, or take individual courses as Occasional Students. Earlham School of Religion maintains its accreditation through ATS.

In addition to its regular on-campus program, ESR also operates an ATS-accredited, degree granting distance education program called ESR ACCESS.

The institution hosts a number of annual conferences and events including the Leadership Conference, Spirituality Gathering, Pastor's Conference, and a Ministry of Writing Colloquium.

Earlham School of Religion also maintains a number of websites for Quaker research, development, and networking. These include the Digital Quaker Collection, the Quaker Bible Index, the Quaker Career Center, and the Quaker Information Center.
