= Will Herberg =

American writer, intellectual and scholar (1901–1977)

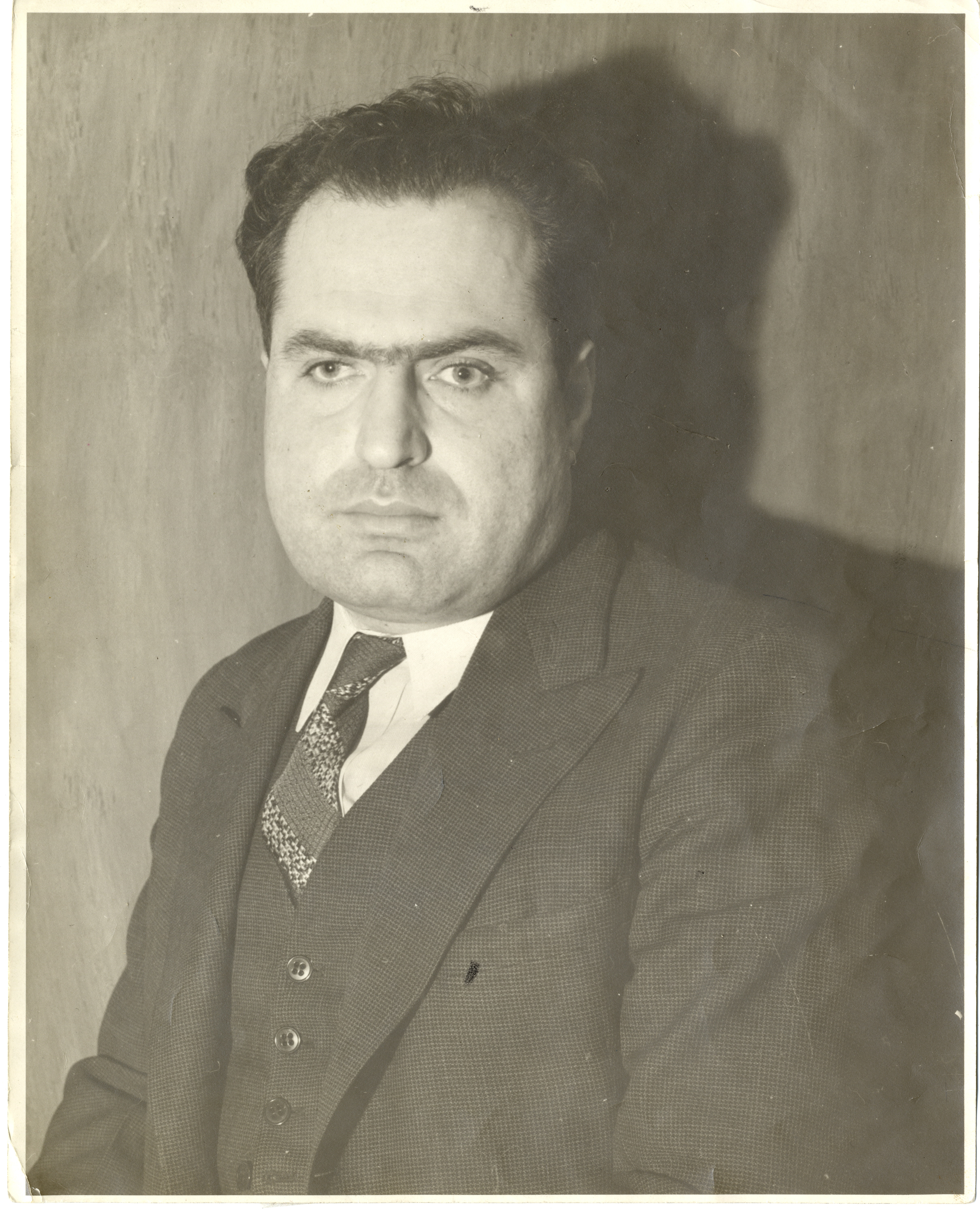
- Herberg in 1939
- Born: William Herberg; June 30, 1901; Lyakhavichy, Minsk Governorate, Russian Empire
- Died: March 26, 1977 (aged 75); Morristown, New Jersey, U.S.
- Occupations: Political activist, theologian, writer
- Spouse: Anna Thompson Herberg
- Writing career
- Subjects: Politics, theology, anti-communism

William Herberg (June 30, 1901 – March 26, 1977) was an American writer, intellectual, and scholar. A communist political activist during his early years, Herberg gained wider public recognition as a social philosopher and sociologist of religion, as well as a Jewish theologian. He was a conservative thinker during the 1950s and a contributor to the National Review magazine.

== Biography ==
=== Early years ===
William Herberg, commonly known as "Will," was born on June 30, 1901, to a Jewish family in the shtetl of Lyakhavichy, Belarus, located near the city of Minsk in what was then part of the Russian Empire. His father, Hyman Louis Herberg (1874–1938), and mother, the former Sarah Wolkow (1872–1942) were themselves born in the same provincial village. Although no records remain to document the family's financial status, Herberg's biographer indicates that the family was not impoverished, with his father the recipient of a gymnasium education and successful enough as an electrical contractor to pay for the family's emigration from the anti-semitic Tsarist regime to a new life in America in 1904.

Arriving in New York City, the Herberg family took up residence in a poor Jewish neighborhood in Brooklyn, New York. The family's economic position deteriorated in America, however, and Will's parents were divorced about ten years after arriving in the United States, with Will and his younger brother raised by his mother, who earned money as a housekeeper and small-scale manufacturer of knit fabric belts. The boys aided the family income by helping with belt-making, although a very high priority was placed by his mother on education, and great financial sacrifices were made to ensure that the two boys stayed on an academically oriented path.

Will attended public school in Brooklyn, entering the prestigious Boys' High School in February 1915. During his high school years, Herberg demonstrated great capacity as a student, studying mathematics, physics, German, Hebrew, and French, while writing poetry in his spare time. Herberg graduated from Boys' High School in June 1918 and entered the tuition-free City College that same fall.

While at City College, Herberg studied mathematics, English literature, and various physical sciences, developing a keen interest in psychology and the writings of Sigmund Freud. While his grades in these subjects were above average, he had difficulty with requirements in physical education and exhibited an antipathy to required courses in military science. Herberg was suspended from City College in the fall of 1920 due to frequent absences from military science class, accentuated by an altercation with the officer in charge of the course. Herberg finished his career at City College having completed 94 of the 131.5 credits needed for graduation.

Although he never earned a bachelor's degree at City College, Herberg later falsely claimed to have degrees from Columbia University, including a PhD in 1932. However, he later received three honorary doctorates, the first in 1956.

=== Political radicalism ===
The exact timetable of Will Herberg's radicalization is unclear; according to his brother, Ted Herberg, Will's difficulty with the military science officer, his subsequent dismissal from college, and the troubled financial situation of his family led him to the ideas of revolutionary socialism. Be that as it may, by 1925 Herberg was a prominent member of the Young Workers League (YWL) — youth section of the Workers (Communist) Party — and a contributor to the group's weekly newspaper, The Young Worker. In the fall of 1925, Herberg was elected a delegate by YWL District 2 (New York City) to the organization's 3rd National Convention, held in Chicago.

The 3rd Convention of the YWL elected Herberg to the governing National Executive Committee, as part of which he served as director of "Agitprop" (Agitation and Propaganda). Herberg was also named a member of a four-member editorial committee for The Young Worker, taking over as chief editor of that publication for acting editor Max Shachtman effective with the issue of November 7, 1925.

In 1925, Herberg married a YWL comrade, the former Anna Thompson, a resident of Brownsville, Brooklyn. The couple would become intellectually compatible throughout Herberg's long ideological journey from communist youth journalist to conservative political writer and prominent Jewish theologian. The couple did not have children. Anna suddenly passed away in mid-1959.

Following the split of party leader Jay Lovestone and his co-thinkers in 1929, Herberg remained loyal to them, a decision earning his expulsion from the party on September 10, 1929. Thereafter Herberg joined the so-called Lovestoneites, remaining with that organization until its termination at the end of 1940, serving as editor of the group's weekly newspaper, Workers Age.

=== Protestant, Catholic, Jew ===
He later turned away from Marxism and became a religious conservative, founding the quarterly Judaism with Robert Gordis and Milton R. Konvitz. During the 1960s, he was the religion editor of the conservative journal National Review, and he also taught at Drew University.

Herberg's 1955 book Protestant, Catholic, Jew: An Essay in American Religious Sociology created a sociological framework for the study of religion in the United States. Herberg demonstrated how immigration and American ethnic culture were reflected in religious movements and institutions. It has been described as "one of the most influential books ever written about American religion." During the 1950s, that book and the 1951 essay Judaism and Modern Man set out influential positions on Judaism and on the American religious tradition in general.

Herberg also wrote that anti-Catholicism is the antisemitism of secular Jewish intellectuals.

=== "Cut flower culture" ===
For some time, Herberg has mistakenly been credited with coining the phrase "cut-flower culture" to describe the spiritual rootlessness of modern European and American societies. Though he did refer to the concept in his 1951 book, Judaism and Modern Man, he credits the idea to another: "The attempt made in recent decades by secularist thinkers to disengage these religious values from their religious context, in the assurance that they could live a life on their own as a 'humanistic' ethic, has resulted in what one writer has called our 'cut-flower' culture [emphasis mine]." The original author to whom Herberg referred to was Quaker Philosopher of Religion, D. Elton Trueblood, who coined the term "cut-flower civilization" in his 1944 book, The Predicament of Modern Man.

=== Opposition to Civil Rights Movement ===
In his September 7, 1965 National Review article, "'Civil Rights' and Violence: Who Are the Guilty Ones?", Herberg wrote of his opposition or skepticism towards the Civil Rights Movement, feeling, like many of his colleagues at National Review at the time, that the civil rights campaign was moving too quickly and broke up the fabric of American society in an overly socially disruptive manner, not friendly to proper social cohesion. They supported what is often termed the Booker T. Washington position of "gradual reform."

=== Final years, death, and legacy ===
Herberg's final published work saw print in the middle of 1973. From that time his health deteriorated steadily, culminating with the discovery of an inoperable brain tumor. Herberg died on March 26, 1977; he was 75 years old at the time of his death.

Herberg's memorial service was held in the Great Hall of Drew University in Madison, New Jersey, and was attended by a throng of rabbis, professors, and former students and political associates. Herberg was buried in Morris Plains, New Jersey, next to the grave of his previously departed wife, Anna.

Herberg was a traditionalist conservative and contributor to traditionalist publications such as Russell Kirk's Modern Age and to William F. Buckley, Jr.'s conservative magazine National Review, which published a special issue in August 1977 in Herberg's honor.

== Works ==
- American Revolutionary Traditions. New York: New Workers School, 1932.
- The Heritage of the Civil War. New York : Workers Age Publishing Association, 1932.
- Dialectical Materialism. New York: New Workers School, 1933.
- Historical Materialism. New York: New Workers School, 1933.
- The NRA and American Labor. New York : Workers Age Publishing Association, 1933.
- Theoretical System of Leninism. New York: New Workers School, 1934.
- Outline for the Study of Dialectical Materialism and the Life of Man. New York: New Workers School, 1935.
- Foundations of Marxism: Study Outline. New York: New Workers School, 1936.
- Marxism and Modern Political Thought. New York: New Workers School, 1936.
- Marxism and Political Thought. New York: New Workers School, 1930s.
- Which Program for Revolutionists? New York: New Workers School, 1930s.
- The CIO, Labor's New Challenge. New York: Workers Age Publishing Association, 1937.
- Rivera Murals: Permanent Exhibition. New York: International Ladies' Garment Workers' Union, 1943.
- Bureaucracy and Democracy in Labor Unions. New York: Great Island Conference, 1947.
- The Theology of Reinhold Niebuhr. New York: Frontier Fellowship, 1950.
- Judaism and Modern Man: An Interpretation of Jewish Religion. New York, Farrar, Straus and Young, 1951.
- "Jewish Labor Movement in the United States: Early Years to World War I," Industrial and Labor Relations Review, vol. 5, no. 4 (July 1952), pp. 501–523. In JSTOR.
- Protestant, Catholic, Jew: An Essay in American Religious Sociology. Garden City, NY: Doubleday, 1955.
- Jewish Labor in the US: Its History and Contributions to American Life. New York: Jewish Labor Committee, Atran Center for Jewish Culture, 1955.
- The Writings Of Martin Buber. (Editor.) New York: Meridian Books, 1956.
- Four Existentialist Theologians: A Reader from the Works of Jacques Maritain, Nicholas Berdyaev, Martin Buber, and Paul Tillich. Garden City, NY: Doubleday, 1958.
- Athens and Jerusalem: Confrontation and Dialogue Durham: University of New Hampshire, 1965.
- Challenge to Morality: A Symposium. (Contributor.) Tallahassee, FL: Florida State University, 1966.
- Dimensions Symposium: Human Values in a Technological Society. (Contributor.) New York: UAHC, 1971.
- On Academic Freedom. (Contributor.) Washington, DC: American Enterprise Institute for Public Policy Research, 1971.
- Martin Buber: Personalist Philosopher in an Age of Depersonalization. West Hartford, CT: Saint Joseph College, 1972.
- The State of the Churches in the USA 1973 as Shown in their Own Official Yearbooks: A Study Research. Sun City, AZ: Ecumenism Research Agency, 1973.
- Faith Enacted As History: Essays in Biblical Theology. Philadelphia: Westminster Press, 1976.
- From Marxism to Judaism: The Collected Essays of Will Herberg. (David G. Dalin, ed.) New York: Marcus Wiener Publishing Co., 1989.
- Jewish Perspectives on Christianity: Leo Baeck, Martin Buber, Franz Rosenzweig, Will Herberg, and Abraham J. Heschel. (Contributor.) New York: Crossroad, 1990.
