= Stephen Ministries =

American Christian educational non-profit

Coordinates: 38°41′34.17″N 90°21′18.37″W

- Established: 1975; 51 years ago
- Purpose: Care for people in distress
- Headquarters: 2045 Innerbelt Business Center Dr. St. Louis, Missouri 63114
- Region served: Worldwide
- Founder: Rev. Kenneth C. Haugk
- Affiliations: Christian
- Staff: 40
- Website: Stephen Ministries

Stephen Ministries (or Stephen Ministries St. Louis) is an independent, not-for-profit Christian educational organization. Its main activity is the training of Stephen Leaders who then train others in their congregation to be Stephen Ministers, capable of accompanying those who are facing some crisis in life; for instance, illness, death of a loved one, divorce, relocation, or financial setback. It was founded in 1975 in St. Louis, Missouri, by the psychologist Rev. Kenneth C. Haugk, and is still based in St. Louis.

The organization is named for St. Stephen, one of seven deacons appointed by the Apostles to distribute food and charitable aid to poorer members of the community in the early Church (Acts 6:5).

== Program ==
Stephen Ministry is a lay care giving ministry that supplements pastoral care. The program teaches laypersons to provide one-on-one care for individuals who request support. The confidential care-giver and care-receiver relationship, usually conducted by weekly visits, may continue for months or years. Reasons for requesting a Stephen Minister’s visits may range from grieving the loss of a loved one, experiencing a major illness, going through a divorce, job loss, struggling with substance abuse, or other life difficulties.

Stephen Ministry curriculum provides a formal, structured introduction to human psychology and peer-to-peer counseling. Curriculum materials, which draw on literature from pastoral counselors, Biblical scripture, theologians, and psychologists, cover such issues as assertiveness and honesty, healthy boundaries, confidentiality, and ways to proceed with referral to mental health professionals when appropriate.

The central offices of Stephen Ministry are located in St. Louis, Missouri. Congregations which choose to participate in Stephen Ministry programming pay a fee to the central organization to cover the cost of intensive on-site training of lay leaders. These lay leaders then become instructors for the 50 hours of training for small groups of Stephen Ministers. After this initial training is completed, Stephen Ministers participate in twice-monthly peer-to-peer supervision meetings. Supervision groups, which may be led by a pastor, are an essential component of support for and guidance to lay ministers.

More than 12,000 congregations from 160 Christian denominations are now involved, and are located in the U.S., Canada, and 24 other countries.

In addition to the Stephen Series, Stephen Ministries St. Louis also offers many other resources, such as adult education courses and books on assertiveness, grief, spiritual gifts discovery, and more.

The Stephen Ministries staff consists of a team of 40 people—pastors and laity—from a variety of denominational backgrounds.

The mission of the Stephen Ministries organization is summed up in St. Paul’s letter to the Ephesians. “To equip the saints for the work of ministry, for building up the body of Christ, until all of us come to the unity of the faith and of the knowledge of the Son of God, to maturity, to the measure of the full stature of Christ” (Ephesians 4:12–13).

== See also ==
- Pastoral counseling
- Christian counseling
