= Earlham College =

Private college in Richmond, Indiana, US

Coordinates: 39°49′28.44″N 84°54′47.78″W

- Former name: Friends Boarding School (1847–1859)
- Motto: Vita Lux Hominum (Life is the Light of Man)
- Type: Private liberal arts college
- Established: 1847; 179 years ago
- Religious affiliation: Quakers
- Endowment: $427.8 million (2025)
- President: Paul Sniegowski
- Students: 677
- Location: Richmond, Indiana, U.S.
- Campus: Rural, 800 acres (320 ha)
- Colors: Maroon & white
- Nickname: Quakers
- Sporting affiliations: NCAA Division III – HCAC
- Mascot: Big Earl
- Website: earlham.edu

Earlham College is a private liberal arts college in Richmond, Indiana, United States. The college was established in 1847 by the Religious Society of Friends (Quakers) and has a strong focus on Quaker values such as integrity, a commitment to peace and social justice, mutual respect, and community decision-making. Earlham School of Religion is its affiliated graduate seminary.

== History ==
Earlham was founded in 1847 as the Friends Boarding School, a boarding high school for the religious education of Quaker adolescents. In 1859, Earlham became Earlham College, upon the addition of collegiate academics. At this time, Earlham was the third Quaker college in the United States (Haverford College was first, Guilford College the second), and the second U.S. institution of higher education to be coeducational (Oberlin College was first). Though the college initially admitted only students who belonged to the Religious Society of Friends, Earlham began admitting non-Quakers in 1865. The college was named for Earlham Hall, home of the Gurneys, an important English Quaker family.

Over time, as Quakerism in America became more progressive, Earlham's practices changed with them. The college has still remained faithful to its Quaker roots. 1960 marked the establishment of the Earlham School of Religion, then the only Friends seminary in the world.

In 2017, Earlham appointed Alan C. Price as its first African-American president. Price left the position in July 2018, and in November of that year was appointed director of the John F. Kennedy Presidential Library and Museum in Boston.

== Campus ==
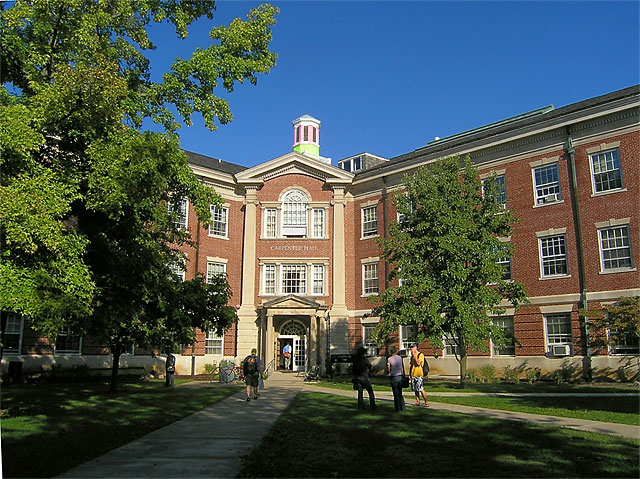
Carpenter Hall at Earlham College

Earlham's 800-acre (3.2 km^{2}) campus lies at the southwestern edge of Richmond, Indiana, a city of 35,720 (2020 census). The main quadrangle of the campus is called "the Heart". It is bordered by Earlham Hall (with the Runyan Center student union directly behind it), Olvey-Andis Hall, Lilly Library, Carpenter Hall, Landrum Bolling Center, the science buildings (Stanley Hall, Noyes Hall and Dennis Hall), Tyler Hall, Bundy Hall and Barrett Hall. Ninety-four percent of Earlham students live on campus in a variety of settings.

The campus has eight residence halls (Barrett Hall, Bundy Hall, Earlham Hall, Mills Hall, Hoerner Hall, Olvey-Andis Hall, Warren Hall and Wilson Hall). In addition, it has 15 theme and friendship houses, which border the North and East edges of the campus.

The school has embarked on major campus improvement projects which cost a combined $62.3 million. The science complex (Stanley and Noyes Halls) has undergone a complete renovation. Stanley Hall was completed by fall 2013 and received a LEED Silver certification. A new Center for Science and Technology, completed in 2015, obtained a LEED gold rating.

While Earlham is predominately an undergraduate institution, it also offers a Master of Arts in Teaching degree.

== Curriculum and community ==
Academic rankings

Liberal arts
- U.S. News & World Report: 83
- Washington Monthly: 165

National
- Forbes: 322
- WSJ/College Pulse: 207

Earlham's most popular undergraduate majors, conferred in 2023 graduates, were:

Biochemistry (19)
Biology (10)
Business Administration and Management (14)
Neuroscience (10)
Psychology (14)

In keeping with Friends' belief in equality, everyone addresses each other at Earlham by his or her first name, without the use of titles such as "doctor" or "professor".

Roughly 70% of Earlham students go on a semester-length off-campus program to such destinations as Mexico, the U.S./ Mexican border, Vienna, Martinique, Northern Ireland, Great Britain, France, Germany, Spain, New Zealand, Japan, and Tanzania.

In the sciences, Earlham places a large emphasis on integrating research into the undergraduate curriculum. Through Ford/Knight grants, most science faculty have been or are currently involved with students in research. Earlham has good representation in the Butler Undergraduate Research Conference, held each year in the spring. Earlham's biology and chemistry departments have a long history of producing distinguished graduates, such as Warder Clyde Allee, Jim Fowler, Larry E. Overman, Harold Urey, and Wendell Stanley, the latter two of which won the Nobel Prize in Chemistry (in 1934 and 1946, respectively). Students and faculty in Earlham's CS applied groups jointly provide computer infrastructure support for the college.

The choir department organizes regional and national tours every year for its ensembles. In January 2012, the concert choir performed in Indianapolis, the Cathedral Basilica of St. Louis, and Chicago. The choral and instrumental music departments collaborate on a biennial basis, performing works such as Carmina Burana and Michael Tippett's A Child of Our Time. The college has a full gamelan ensemble, which performs concerts in the Spring. Earlham has an entirely student-managed public radio station, WECI 91.5FM. In addition, 6-10 theater performances occur throughout the year on campus through either the academic department, senior projects or the student company.

Earlham has students from 77 countries, which equates to roughly 200 students. This high diversity is due in part to a strong relationship with the United World College network of international boarding high schools. Since 2004, Earlham College has been a part of the Davis United World Scholars program, which offers need-based scholarships for UWC graduates to continue their education at select institutions in the United States. The Davis Cup, which is awarded to the college with the most current students from this program, has been awarded to Earlham several times. The college also draws from all regions of the United States, with students from 42 states. Domestic minorities represent 15% of the student body.

Earlham is orienting some of the curriculum around exploring local and global problems as well as possible solutions. In 2016, Earlham students won the million dollar Hult Prize for their "Magic Bus" proposal to help with transportation problems in developing urban environments.

Earlham has the United States' only equestrian program which is run entirely by students. Lessons are available for students of the college and community members. The equestrian center is adjacent to the college-owned 11-acre Miller farm which hosts agricultural interns during the school year and summer and "work days" on Saturdays for the rest of the community during the school year. Miller farm also serves as a residence for upper class students.

In keeping with Quaker tradition, Earlham students voluntarily invest many hours of community service into the Richmond community.

== Athletics ==
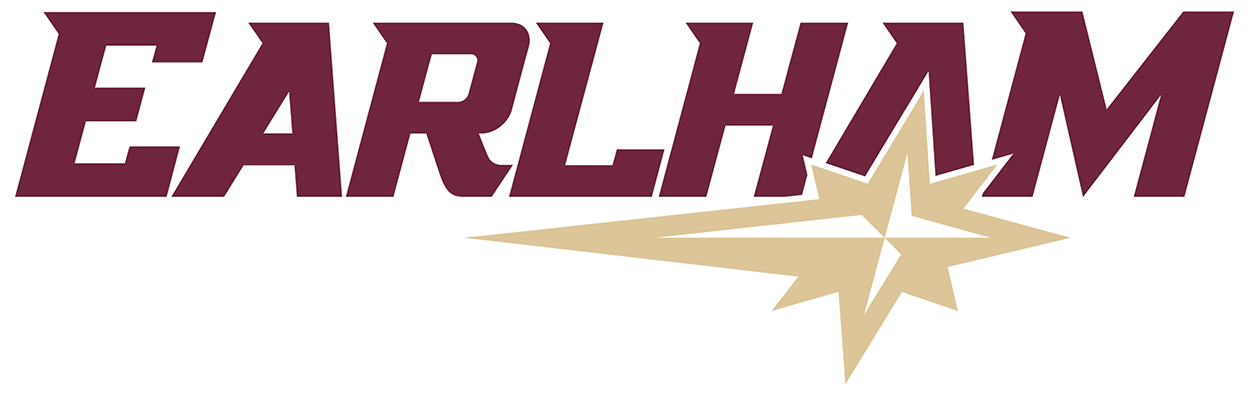
Earlham Quakers wordmark

Earlham teams (nicknamed Quakers) compete in NCAA Division III and in the Heartland Collegiate Athletic Conference. The women's sports are basketball, cross country, field hockey, golf, indoor track, lacrosse, outdoor track, soccer, softball, tennis, and volleyball. The men's sports are baseball, basketball, cross country, golf, indoor track, lacrosse, outdoor track, soccer, and tennis.

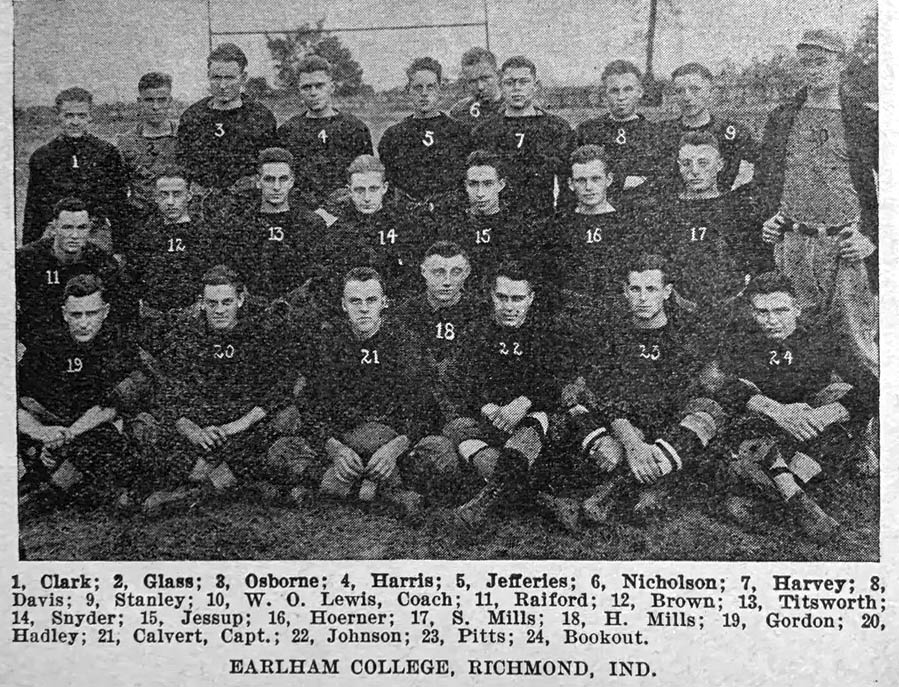
Earlham football team of 1917

The football team was organized in 1888 and has been playing games since the 1889 season. As one of the earliest college programs, Earlham has competed against larger foes such as Indiana University, Purdue University, the University of Kentucky, Ball State University, and Butler University. Perhaps the Quakers' most notable football game was an exhibition game against Japan's Doshisha University Hamburgers in 1989. After setting an NCAA Division III record of five consecutive winless seasons, Earlham's football program was suspended starting with the 2019 season. In May 2020, the college announced suspension of men's and women's golf and tennis teams.

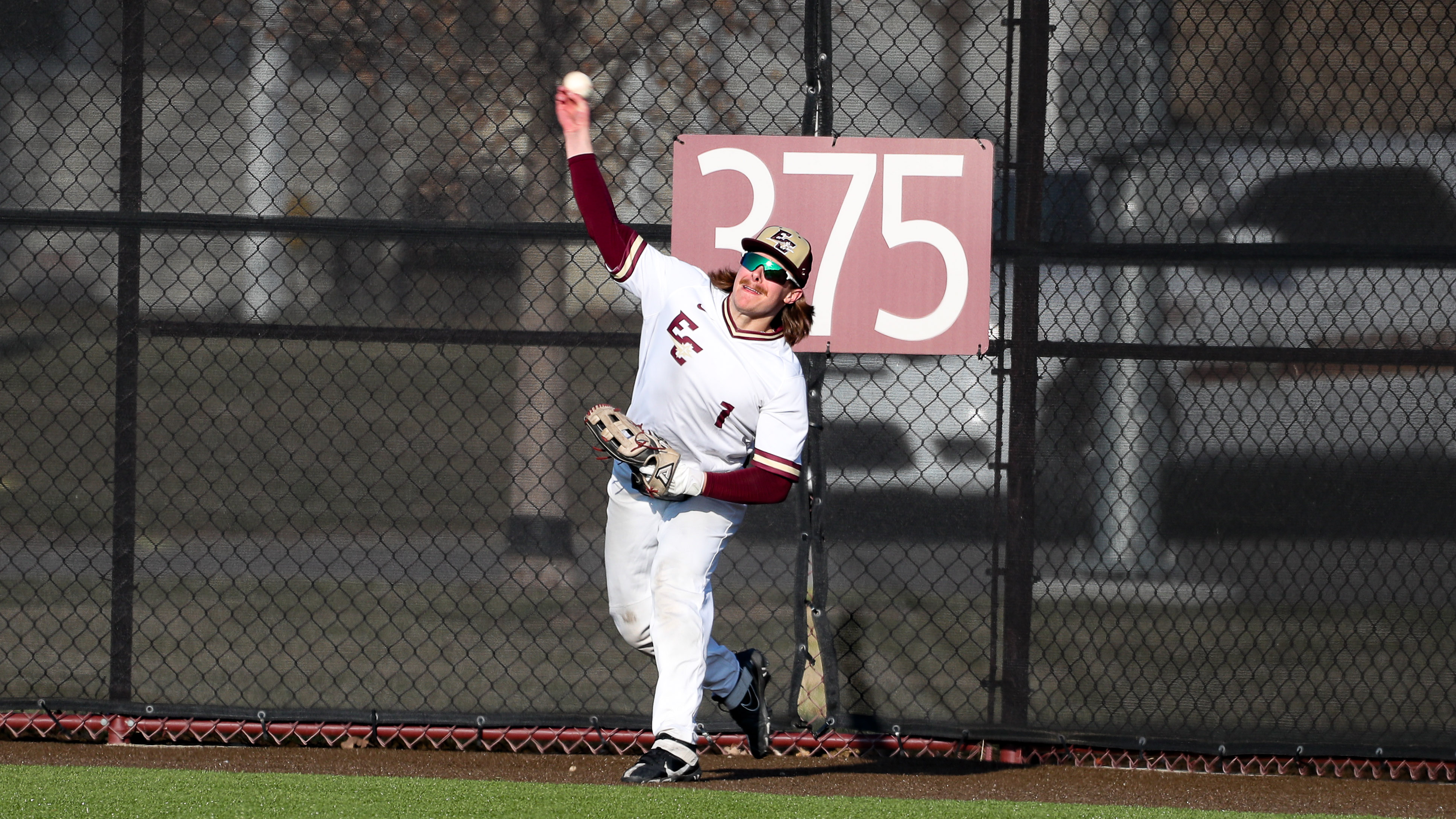
The Earlham College baseball team is one of 18 NCAA Division III sports offered on campus

In past years, Earlham was an NAIA member in all sports; they won the NAIA men's soccer national title in 1963. In the 2010–11 season, the Earlham College Men's Tennis team became the first squad in Earlham history to qualify for the NCAA Div. III Championships by winning the Heartland Collegiate Athletic Conference Tournament title.

Earlham's club teams include Ultimate Frisbee, Women's and Men's rugby, the Bike Co-Op, Cheerleaders, Earthquakers (Competitive Dance), Equestrian Program, martial arts groups, Men's Volleyball, and Outdoors Club. A $13-million Athletics and Wellness Center opened at the beginning of the Fall 1999 semester. Students are not charged to use the facility, which features an energy center for cardiovascular and strength training, a group fitness studio for aerobics and yoga, Weber Pool (25 meters by six lanes), racquetball courts, tennis courts, a running track, a climbing wall and Schuckman Court (a performance gymnasium with seating for 1,800). In 2007, Earlham opened its new 2,000-seat Darrell Beane Stadium, with a football field and running track.
