= Cornerstone Television =

American religious television network

- Country: United States
- Headquarters: 1 Signal Hill Drive; Wall, Pennsylvania

Programming
- Language: English

History
- Launched: April 15, 1979; 46 years ago

Links
- Website: www.ctvn.org

The Cornerstone Television Network is a non-commercial Christian broadcast and satellite television network based in Wall, Pennsylvania, United States. Its founder was Russ Bixler. The network has 44 full-power and 57 low-power affiliate stations, 1 online affiliate station, and it is on the Glorystar satellite service.

== History ==
In the late 1970s, Norma Bixler claimed to have received a vision from God while visiting the Christian Broadcasting Network's headquarters in Virginia Beach, Virginia, to launch a Christian television station in Pittsburgh. Though her husband Russ was wary of the numerous hurdles to overcome to launch a full-power television station, he eventually was convinced to share in his wife's dream and pursue the vision. With the assistance of CBN's Pat Robertson, along with Loren Cunningham, and Jim Bakker, they were able to navigate the build-out and licensing issues, then pursued professional talent such as Bill Freeman, Oleen Eagle, Stan Scott, and Eleanor Clarke, and numerous volunteers to launch Christian television in Pittsburgh.

WPCB-TV, the network's first station, launched in 1979, Through the years, it purchased and launched other stations throughout Pennsylvania and Ohio before the cable and satellite age in the 90s allowed it to expand nationwide, then with the launch of the Internet, beyond the United States.

In 2008, the network had 163 affiliate stations.

== Programming ==
Cornerstone Television Network broadcasts 24 hours a day, 7 days a week. Programming includes preachers, teachers, international leaders, movies, documentaries, music, and holiday specials for people of all ages.

== List of affiliates ==
Call letters	City and state	Channel	Meaning or notes
WPCB-TV	Pittsburgh, Pennsylvania	40	flagship station
WKBS-TV	Altoona, Pennsylvania	47	satellite of WPCB
KFFS-CD	Fayetteville, Arkansas	36.9	
WTVU-CD	Syracuse, New York	22	
WAWW-LD	Rochester, New York	20.4	
WWDG-CD	Utica, New York	22	
W30EI-D	Youngstown, Ohio	30	
W24ER-D	Clarksburg, West Virginia	21	
K14JS-D	Cortez, Colorado	14	
