= WPCB-TV =

Television station in Greensburg, Pennsylvania

- Greensburg–Pittsburgh, Pennsylvania; United States
- City: Greensburg, Pennsylvania
- Channels: Digital: 28 (UHF); Virtual: 40

Programming
- Affiliations: 40.1: Cornerstone TV; for others, see § Subchannels

Ownership
- Owner: Cornerstone Television, Inc.

History
- First air date: April 15, 1979
- Former channel numbers: Analog: 40 (UHF, 1979–2009); Digital: 50 (UHF, 2003–2019)
- Call sign meaning: Western Pennsylvania Christian Broadcasting (original name of company)

Technical information
- Licensing authority: FCC
- Facility ID: 13924
- ERP: 530 kW
- HAAT: 278 m (912 ft)
- Transmitter coordinates: 40°23′34″N 79°46′53″W
- Translator(s): WKBS-TV 47 Altoona

Links
- Public license information: Public file; LMS
- Website: www.ctvn.org

WPCB-TV (channel 40) is a television station licensed to Greensburg, Pennsylvania, United States, serving the Pittsburgh area as the flagship of the religious network Cornerstone Television. Cornerstone originates most of its programs from this station. WPCB-TV's studios and transmitter are co-located on Signal Hill Drive in Wall, Pennsylvania.

WKBS-TV (channel 47) in Altoona operates as a full-time satellite of WPCB.

== History ==
In the 1960s, Rev. Russ Bixler was visiting the Virginia Beach area and came across independent station WYAH-TV, which was running an all-Christian format. Bixler came to visit the Christian Broadcasting Network studios, meeting Pat Robertson and Jim Bakker. Concluding that Pittsburgh needed a similar station, Bixler applied for the channel 22 license in the 1970s, but lost to Commercial Radio Institute, a forerunner of Sinclair Broadcast Group in 1975, who would launch that station as secular independent WPTT-TV in 1978. Bixler then applied for a license on channel 40, and was granted a construction permit for that channel in 1976.

After several hurdles, Bixler was able to get the needed equipment and was able to sell a few hours a day of programming time to Christian organizations. WPCB-TV finally began operations on April 15, 1979. The station was initially on the air for 15 hours a day, and within a year expanded to a 24-hour schedule. Programming consisted of several runs a day of the two-hour edition of the PTL Club, the 90-minute edition of The 700 Club, several other shows produced by CBN for the CBN Cable channel, a few children's educational and religious shows, televangelists like Jimmy Swaggart, Rex Humbard, Oral Roberts and Jerry Falwell, and some local church programs. The station also produced a local variety talk and music show, Getting Together. WPCB-TV's programming remains entirely Christian-oriented to this day. From before their sign on, when a person phones the station, the receptionists answer "Jesus Loves You TV 40".

Over the decades, owing to holding a license to operate a commercial television station, WPCB-TV has received countless offers from commercial broadcasters wanting to convert the station into a conventional independent station, but has flatly refused them each time. However, in 1998, Cornerstone attempted to buy the license for non-commercial station WQEX (channel 16), which would have required a sale of the channel 40 license. Paxson Communications made an offer to buy channel 40; if the deal went through, it would have been relaunched as a Pax TV owned-and-operated station under the call letters WKPX-TV. However, at that time the Federal Communications Commission (FCC) did not deem WPCB-TV's religious programming as educational, and Cornerstone's application was withdrawn in 2000; channel 40 was then taken off the market. In 2002, the FCC reversed its position (WQEX was converted into a commercial license later that year; in 2011, it was sold to Paxson's successor, Ion Media Networks, and now carries programming from Pax TV's successor Ion Television as WINP-TV).

Russ Bixler died in 2000, and Ron Hembree, who hosted a program on WPCB-TV, took over as the station's president. Hembree died in June 2010.

== Technical information ==
=== Subchannels ===
The station's signal is multiplexed:

Subchannels of WPCB-TV
Subchannel	Res.	Short name	Programming
40.1	1080i	WPCB	Cornerstone
40.2	720p	CourtTV	Court TV
40.3	720p	The365	365BLK
40.4	480i	Quest	Quest
40.5	480i	GetTV	Great
40.6	480i	DEFY	Defy
40.7	480i	OUTLAW	Outlaw
40.8	480i	PFFC	Pittsburgh's Faith & Family Channel

=== Analog-to-digital conversion ===
WPCB-TV shut down its analog signal, over UHF channel 40, on June 12, 2009, the official date on which full-power television stations in the United States transitioned from analog to digital broadcasts under federal mandate. The station's digital signal continued to broadcast on its pre-transition UHF channel 50, using virtual channel 40.
