= WKBS-TV =

Television station in Altoona, Pennsylvania

Satellite of WPCB-TV, Greensburg–Pittsburgh, Pennsylvania
- Altoona–Johnstown–; State College, Pennsylvania; United States
- City: Altoona, Pennsylvania
- Channels: Digital: 6 (VHF); Virtual: 47
- Branding: Cornerstone Network

Programming
- Affiliations: 47.1: Cornerstone TV; for others, see § Subchannels

Ownership
- Owner: Cornerstone Television, Inc.

History
- Founded: October 9, 1984
- First air date: November 2, 1985
- Former channel numbers: Analog: 47 (UHF, 1985–2009); Digital: 46 (UHF, 2002–2019); Virtual: 46 (January–February 2021)
- Call sign meaning: Kaiser Broadcasting System (original call letters of the former Philadelphia station that went dark in 1983)

Technical information
- Licensing authority: FCC
- Facility ID: 13929
- ERP: 3.1 kW
- HAAT: 305 m (1,001 ft)
- Transmitter coordinates: 40°34′3.7″N 78°26′25.2″W

Links
- Public license information: Public file; LMS
- Website: www.ctvn.org

WKBS-TV (channel 47) is a religious television station in Altoona, Pennsylvania, United States, owned by Cornerstone Television. The station's transmitter is located on Wopsononock Lookout in Logan Township.

WKBS-TV operates as a full-time satellite of Cornerstone's flagship station, Greensburg-licensed WPCB-TV (channel 40), whose studios are located on Signal Hill Drive in Wall, Pennsylvania. WKBS-TV covers areas of West-Central Pennsylvania that receive a marginal to non-existent over-the-air signal from WPCB-TV, although there is significant overlap between the two stations' contours otherwise. WKBS-TV is a straight simulcast of WPCB-TV; on-air references to WKBS-TV are limited to Federal Communications Commission (FCC)-mandated hourly station identifications during programming. Besides the transmitter, WKBS-TV does not maintain any physical presence in Altoona, and unlike its parent station, it does not broadcast in high definition and has a different subchannel lineup.

== History ==
In 1983, Cornerstone Television was granted a construction permit for channel 47 in Altoona, Pennsylvania, to serve the Johnstown–Altoona market. It bought the transmitter used by the original WKBS-TV (channel 48) in Philadelphia when that station went dark in 1983, and used this transmitter to put channel 47 on the air November 2, 1985, reusing the WKBS-TV call sign.

== Technical information ==
=== Subchannels ===
The station's signal is multiplexed:

Subchannels of WKBS-TV
Channel	Res.	Short name	Programming
47.1	480i	CTVN	Cornerstone (4:3)
47.2	480i	Court	Court TV
47.3	Audio only	WKGO	Simulcast of WKGO radio
47.4	480i	Ion	Ion (4:3)
47.5	Audio only	WEDO	Simulcast of WEDO radio
47.6	480i	AtHome	At Home with Arlene Williams
47.7	480i	Jewelry	Jewelry TV
47.8	480i	PFF	Pittsburgh Faith & Family Channel

=== Analog-to-digital conversion ===
WKBS-TV shut down its analog signal, over UHF channel 47, on June 12, 2009, the official date on which full-power television stations in the United States transitioned from analog to digital broadcasts under federal mandate. The station's digital signal remained on its pre-transition UHF channel 46, using virtual channel 47.
