= Church of the Brethren =

Anabaptist denomination in the United States, descended from the Schwarzenau Brethren

- The Church of the Brethren references the Crucifixion of Jesus with a Latin cross, unity with the circle motif, and biblical references to water and baptism with the wave
- Classification: Protestant
- Orientation: Radical Pietist Anabaptist
- Theology: Non-creedal
- Structure: Congregationalist with districts that meet together in an Annual Conference
- Distinct fellowships: The Church of the Brethren, Inc. (ministry and administration), Bethany Theological Seminary, Eder Financial (financial & retirement services), On Earth Peace (peace initiative)
- Associations: Brethren World Assembly, Christian Churches Together, Christian Peacemaker Teams, Church World Service, Historic Peace Churches, Leadership Conference on Civil Rights, National Council of Churches, World Council of Churches
- Region: United States (headquarters), with groups in Brazil; the Dominican Republic; Haiti; Nigeria and Oku, Cameroon; Spain; and South Sudan; also present in Ecuador (United Andean Indian Mission) and India having (two Brethren denominations and the Church of North India).
- Headquarters: Elgin, Illinois, United States
- Founder: Alexander Mack and the Schwarzenau Brethren
- Origin: 1708; Schwarzenau, Germany
- Branched from: Schwarzenau Brethren in the United States
- Separations: Dunkard Brethren Church (1926)
- Congregations: 2,600
- Members: 600,000
- Aid organization: Brethren Disaster Ministries, Brethren Service Center, Brethren Volunteer Service, Children's Disaster Services, Heifer International, SERRV International
- Nursing homes: 21 (Fellowship of Brethren Homes)
- Tertiary institutions: Six colleges and universities (Bridgewater College, Elizabethtown College, Juniata College, Manchester University, McPherson College, and University of La Verne), one seminary (Bethany Theological Seminary), see also Brethren Colleges Abroad
- Official website: brethren.org

The Church of the Brethren is an Anabaptist Christian denomination in the Schwarzenau Brethren tradition (German: Schwarzenauer Neutäufer "Schwarzenau New Baptists") that was organized in 1708 by Alexander Mack in Schwarzenau, Germany during the Radical Pietist revival. The denomination holds the New Testament as its only creed. Historically, the church has taken a strong stance for nonresistance or Christian pacifism—it is one of the three historic peace churches, alongside the Mennonites and Quakers. Distinctive practices include believer's baptism by forward trine immersion; a threefold love feast consisting of feet washing, a fellowship meal, and communion; anointing for healing; and the holy kiss. Its headquarters are in Elgin, Illinois, United States.

The first Brethren congregation was established in the United States in 1723. These church bodies became commonly known as "Dunkards" or "Dunkers", and more formally as German Baptist Brethren. The Church of the Brethren represents the largest denomination descended from the Schwarzenau Brethren, adopting this name in 1908.

== History ==
=== Early history ===
The history of the Schwarzenau Brethren began in 1708 when a group of eight Christians organized themselves under the leadership of Alexander Mack (1679–1735) into a church and baptized one another in Schwarzenau, Germany, now part of Bad Berleburg in North Rhine-Westphalia. Five men and three women gathered at the Eder (pronounced ey-duhr), a small river that flows through Schwarzenau, to perform baptism as an outward symbol of their new faith. One of the members of the group first baptized Mack, who then, in turn, baptized the other seven.

They believed that the established European churches – Catholic, Lutheran, and Reformed – were missing the point of true Christianity as taught by Jesus in the Sermon on the Mount, and as revealed in the New Testament and exemplified by the Early Church. After searching for a church that taught New Testament discipleship and finding none in their area, they committed to follow the commands and example of Jesus in their daily lives regardless of the cost. They rejected established state churches, including infant baptism, existing Eucharistic practices, and the use of physical coercion against other humans. The founding Brethren were initially influenced by Radical Pietist understandings of an invisible, nondenominational church of awakened Christians who would fellowship together in purity and love, awaiting Christ's return; yet they embraced an Anabaptist understanding of the church as a disciplined faith community that enforced Christian standards of discipleship upon those who chose to join their fellowship. The eight founding members referred to themselves as "brethren", and New Baptists (German: Neue Täufer). The name alluded to the use of the name Täufer (Baptists) by the Mennonites. They suffered persecution for their stand, much as the earlier Anabaptists had.

The Brethren soon moved to seek religious freedom in America. They founded the first American congregation on Christmas Day 1723 in Germantown, Pennsylvania, then a village outside Philadelphia. They became known as German Baptist Brethren (although this name was not officially recognized until 1836, when the Annual Meeting called itself "The Fraternity of German Baptist Brethren"). In 1871, the denomination adopted the name, "The German Baptist Brethren Church". Until the early 20th century, Brethren were colloquially called Tunkers or Dunkers (from the German for immersionists).

In 1728, Conrad Beissel, a Brethren minister at Conestoga (Lancaster County, Pa.) renounced his association with the Brethren and formed his own group in Ephrata, Pennsylvania. They came to be known as the Ephrata Cloister. Beissel practiced a mystical form of Christianity. He encouraged celibacy, a vegetarian diet, and recognition of Saturday as the Sabbath.

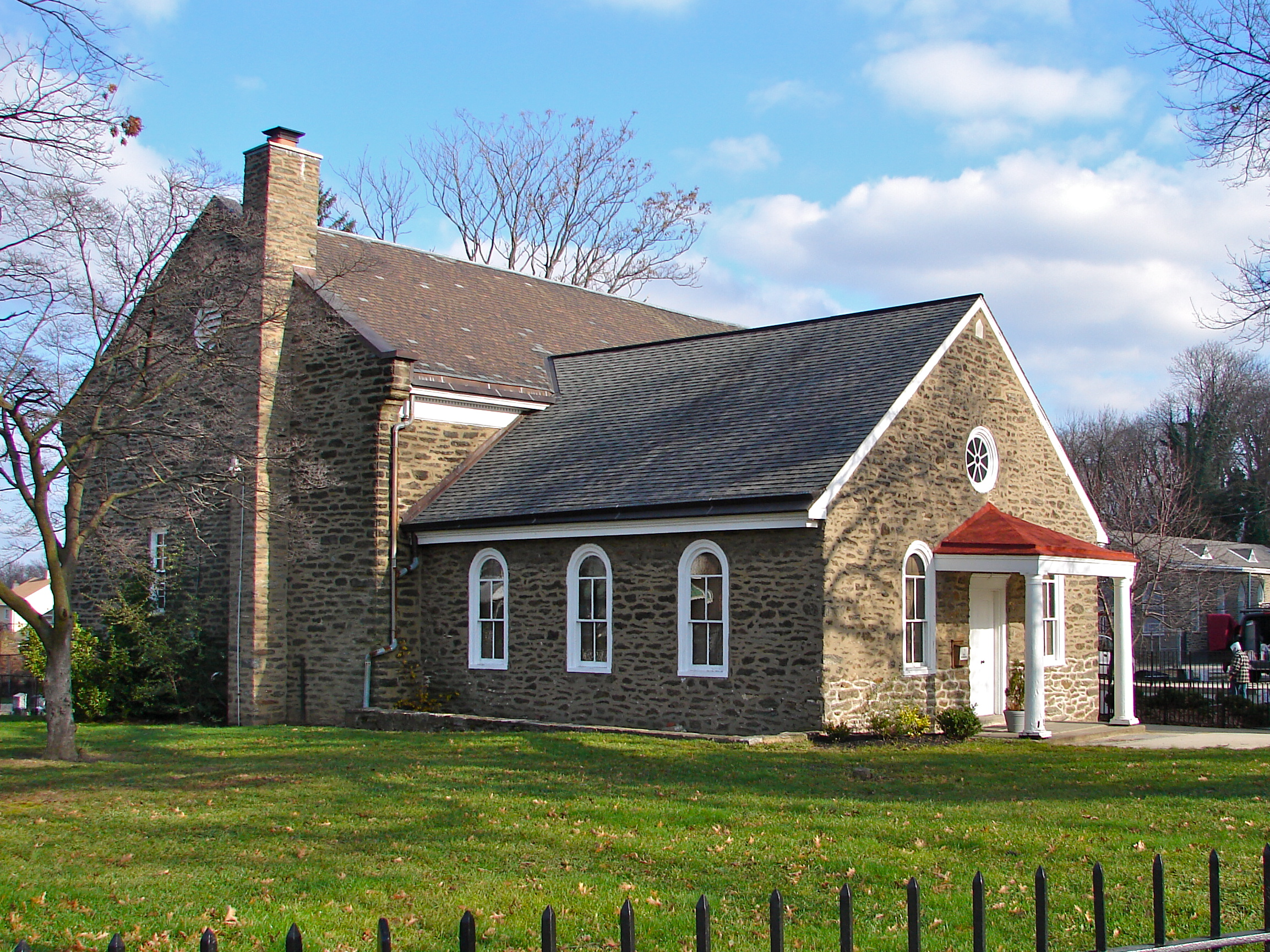
The first Brethren church built in America, in Germantown near Philadelphia

=== Division in the 1880s ===
After the Beissel split, the Brethren split several times because of doctrinal differences. The most traditionalist members emphasized consistency, obedience, and the order of the Brethren. They opposed the use of musical instruments, Sunday schools, revival meetings, and worldly amusements. They promoted plain dress, plain living, and church discipline. The progressives in the church focused on grace and acceptance. They promoted higher education, salaried ministers, Sunday schools, and revivalism. The majority of Brethren held a position between the two extremes.

In 1869 and 1880, a group of Brethren in the Miami Valley of Ohio submitted a petition to Annual Conference to stop liberalization and return to traditional Brethren practices, which they identified with the "primitive" apostolic faith. On both occasions, a more moderate petition was submitted to the delegates. Both times, the Miami Valley group found the rewording unacceptable.

In 1881, they resubmitted their petition to Annual Conference, and it was rejected for violating technical procedure. In November 1881, traditionalist Brethren led by the Miami Valley group met and formally split from the Church of the Brethren to form the Old German Baptist Brethren. They held their first annual meeting in 1882.

At the same time, Henry Holsinger, a leader of the progressives in the church, published writings that some Brethren considered slanderous and schismatic. As a result, he was disfellowshipped from the 1882 annual meeting of the Brethren. He met with other progressives on June 6 and 7, 1883, and together they formed the Brethren Church.

The remaining middle group—called "conservatives"—retained the name German Baptist Brethren. At the Annual Conference of 1908 at Des Moines, Iowa, the name was officially changed to the Church of the Brethren. The Annual Conference justified the name change by citing the predominant use of English in the church, the fact that the name "German Baptist" frustrated mission work, and that it would disassociate the denomination from the Old German Baptist Brethren.

=== 20th century ===
During the early 20th century, the Church of the Brethren invested heavily in foreign missions in India, China, and other nations. They also embraced the American temperance movement.

The denomination's two-hundred year old peace position was tested when delegates at the Goshen Conference in Goshen, Indiana, adopted the 1918 Statement on War and Violence, nine months after the United States entered the war, to address the issue of conscientious objectors. In July of that year, leaders of the conference were threatened with punishment by the US government under the Sedition Act. The church leaders agreed not to retract the statement, but to withdraw it from circulation.

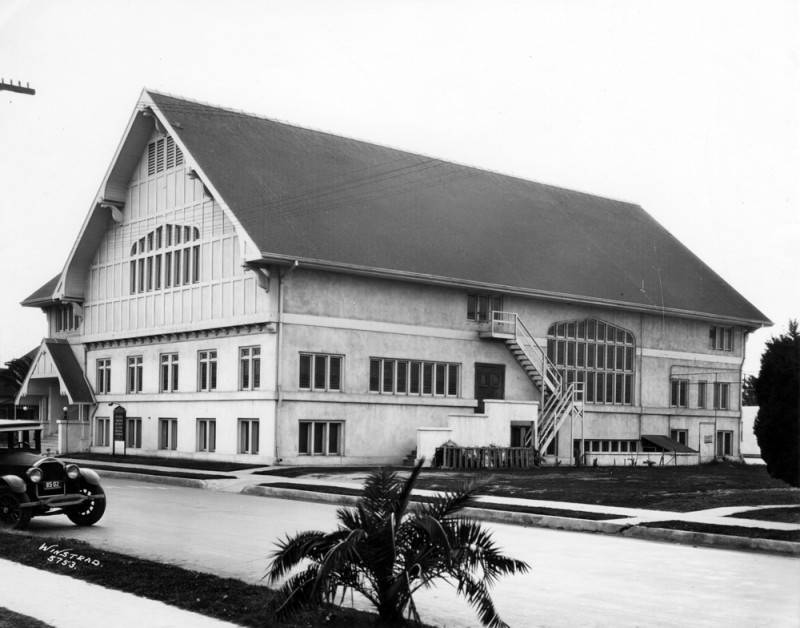
First Brethren Church in Long Beach, California, circa 1920

Discipline for violating church teachings during the church's first two hundred years ranged from setting members "back" from communion to disfellowshipping them as members to, in rare cases, "avoidance" (or shunning). These practices gradually subsided as the earlier emphasis upon unity of practice (the "order of the Brethren") gave way during the 1920s and 1930s to an emphasis upon individual moral autonomy. Martin Grove Brumbaugh—a Brethren minister and historian who became governor of Pennsylvania in 1915—played a leading role in disseminating a more progressive vision of Brethren history and practice. His questionable claim that "no force in religion" had been a Brethren teaching since their founding reinforced his calls to relax church discipline. These changes led to an exodus of many conservative Brethren in the 1920s, who organized the Dunkard Brethren Church, which continues to uphold the Brethren practices of plain dress and headcovering.

During the 1940s and 1950s, acts of global Christian service flourished and energized the denomination. Service work was centered at the Brethren Service Center in New Windsor, Md., after Brethren purchased a former college campus there for that purpose. Many Brethren joined Brethren Volunteer Service and Heifers for Relief, which incorporated independently in 1953 and eventually became Heifer International. The Brethren helped establish the Christian Rural Overseas Program (CROP), which was originally housed at Bethany Biblical Seminary, the Brethren seminary in Oak Brook, Illinois. Well-known leaders of the Brethren Service initiatives included Dan West and M.R. (Michael Robert) Zigler.

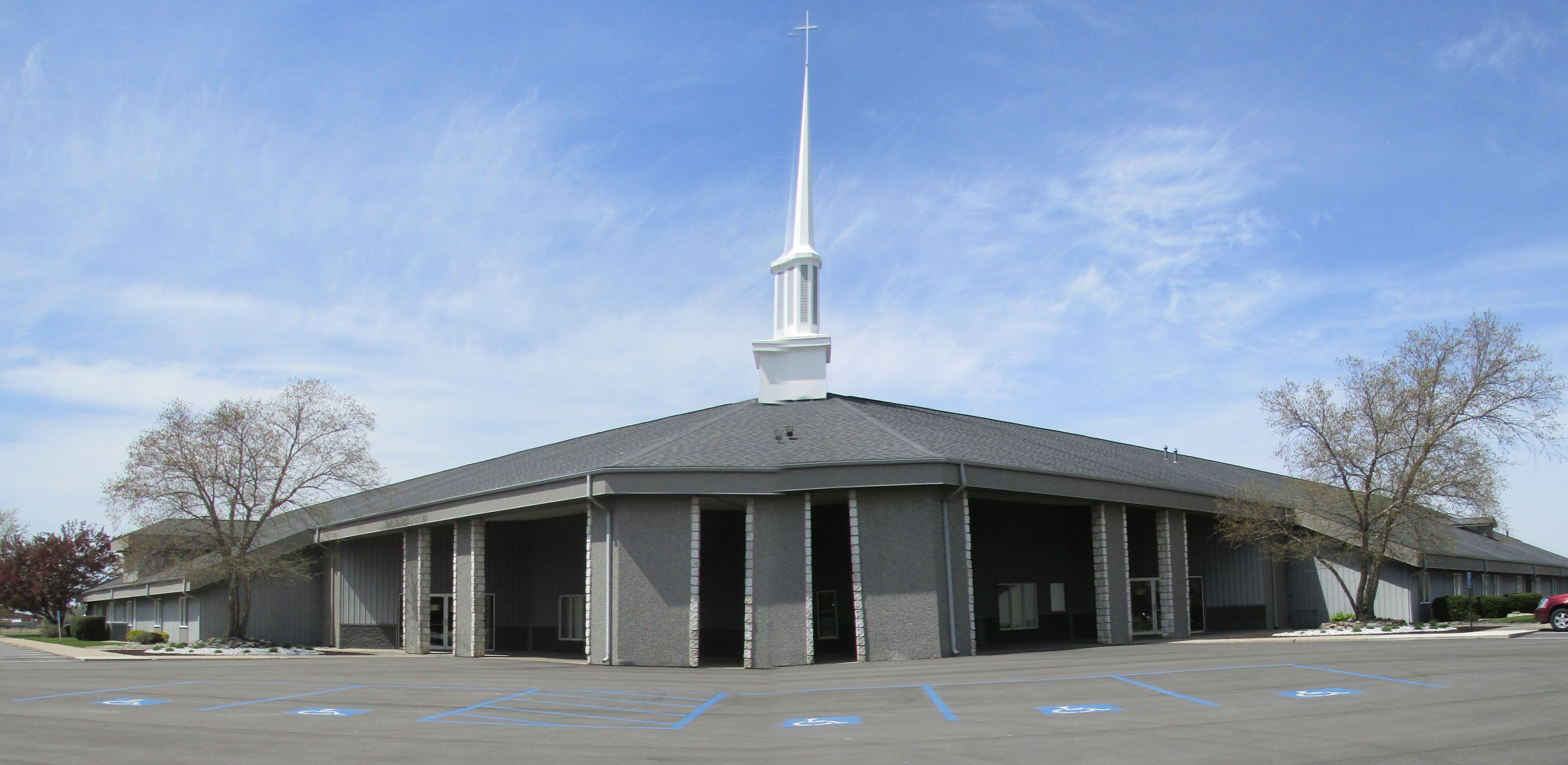
Nappanee First Brethren Church, Indiana, United States.

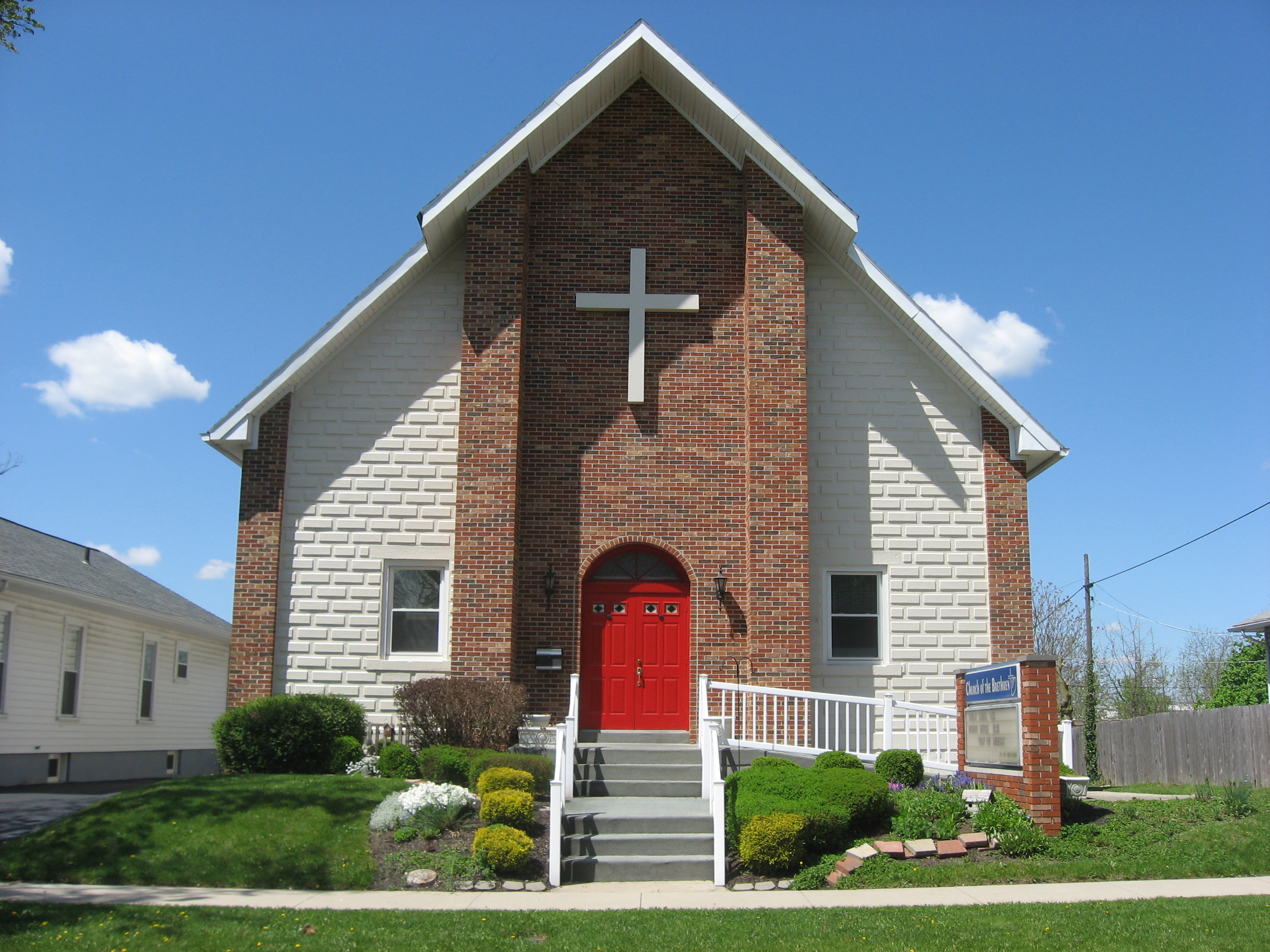
Church of the Brethren, Bellefontaine, Ohio, United States

From the end of the Second World War to the present, Brethren have continued to be active in service and missions around the world. Differences have also remained, with Brethren individuals, churches, and districts disagreeing about issues including Biblical authority, ordination of women, homosexuality, climate change, and ecumenism.

The 1958 Annual Conference in Des Moines, Iowa, decided that trine immersion would not be required of all members, allowed ordination of women, opened love feast to members of any church, and permitted bread and cup communion outside of love feast.

At the Annual Conference in Ocean Grove, New Jersey, the next year, a group of conservative Brethren responded by forming the Brethren Revival Fellowship (BRF). The BRF describes itself as "a loyal concern movement within the Church of the Brethren". The BRF advocates simple dress, Biblical inerrancy, church discipline, and an evangelical understanding of faith. It has been critical of the denomination's involvement in political and social causes, as well as its association with the World Council of Churches and the National Council of Churches.

Progressive-leaning groups have also grown. Groups including the Womaen's Caucus, Voices for an Open Spirit, Open Table Cooperative, and Brethren-Mennonite Council on Lesbian, Gay, Bisexual, and Transgender Interests advocate changes to church doctrine and practice. Proposed changes have include giving the denomination a gender-neutral name, allowing LGBT Brethren to be ordained as ministers and get married, and increasing the political and social mission of the church.

Although a divide exists within the church on these issues, the official position of the church is that the Bible is the Word of God, and that covenant relationships between homosexuals are unacceptable. However, the church also affirms "unity in diversity", which generally allows for church districts and congregations to set doctrine.

=== 21st century ===
In July 2019, the Association of Brethren Churches, since renamed the Covenant Brethren Church (CBC), organized as a movement to explore separation from the Church of the Brethren. The CBC began with a vision cast in July 2019, as Church of the Brethren leaders from thirteen districts gathered in Chambersburg, Pennsylvania, to pray, discern, and discuss a new vision for Brethren in the 21st Century. A temporary executive board was called, and sub-teams were tasked with working at various aspects of the vision. Subsequent, steadily growing gatherings of Brethren from across the United States met in Winchester and Woodstock, Virginia and widely affirmed these developments.

On November 16, 2019, at the Antioch Church in the Shenandoah Valley of Virginia, the assembled group was first called The Covenant Brethren Church, and moved toward establishing an office in north-central West Virginia. A Statement of Faith and by-laws are in development for this new movement. The CBC has stated that it fully affirms biblical authority, the sanctity of marriage as expressed in Genesis 2 and affirmed by Jesus Christ in Matthew 19, the sanctity of human life from conception, and the historical New Testament ideals and practices held by the Brethren since 1708.

The Church of the Brethren Leadership Team responded to these developments with a statement expressing concerns with the CBC's direction and said division was "not a path forward". The Church of the Brethren, meanwhile, has been moving forward with a "Compelling Vision Statement" process designed to create a direction for the denomination that will aid in unifying it and moving it forward. In 2024, the worldwide Church of the Brethren organized along national lines to form the Global Church of the Brethren Communion with founding members Brazil, the Democratic Republic of the Congo, the Dominican Republic, Haiti, Honduras, India, Nigeria, Rwanda, Spain, Uganda, the United States, and Venezuela.

In 2023, all six Puerto Rican churches in the Church of the Brethren joined the Covenant Brethren Church. This was affirmed in 2024.

== Statistics ==
According to a denomination census released in 2020, it has 11 member denominations in 11 countries, approximately 2,600 churches and 600,000 baptized members.

A map of the worldwide scope of the Church of the Brethren: Headquarters of the Church (United States) Current overseas missions (Brazil; the Dominican Republic; Haiti; Nigeria and Oku, Cameroon; Spain, and Southern Sudan) Churches that are the result of mergers with other Protestant missions (Ecuador's United Andean Indian Mission and the Church of North India; a single Indian church still belongs to the Church of the Brethren) Foreign missions that have closed (Argentina, China, Denmark and Sweden, France and Switzerland, Indonesia, Niger, and Turkey)

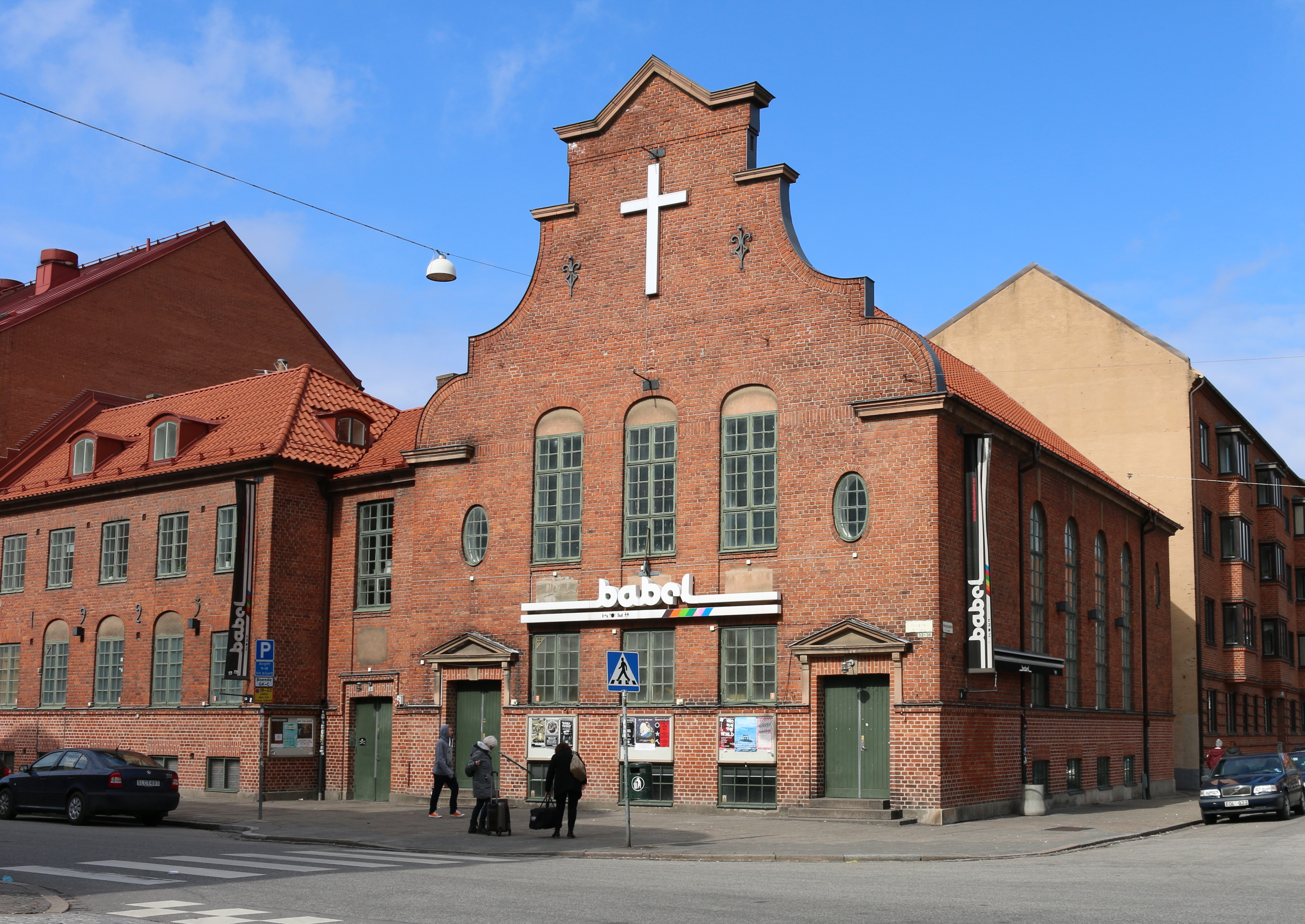
Former Brethren church (Betesda) in Malmö, Scania, Sweden

The Church of the Brethren in the United States—like many other mainline churches—has experienced a steady decline in membership since the middle of the 20th century. Despite the overall decline, growth has occurred in some areas through church planting, evangelism, and outreach. It has also spread into other countries including the Dominican Republic (where it is called "Iglesia de los Hermanos"), Haiti (as "Eglise des Frères Haitiens"), Brazil, and Spain.

In Nigeria, the Church of the Brethren is literally known as "Church of the Children of the Same Mother" (Hausa: Ekklesiyar Yan'uwa a Nigeria, or EYN). Mission work began in Nigeria in 1923. The membership of EYN, which must be renewed annually, reached 148,000 members in 2002, surpassing the membership of the US-based church. In 1965, the Brethren missionaries working in Ecuador since 1945, merged the churches they planted with those of the United Andean Indian Mission, to form the United Evangelical Church, now United Evangelical Methodist Church of Ecuador. In a similar way, in 1970, the mission in India merged with the Anglicans, Baptists, Disciples of Christ and Presbyterians to form the Church of North India, though some congregations have seceded since the merger.

As of 2019 it was reported on the church's yearbook that US membership had dropped below 100,000 and as of 2020 membership dropped around 91,000. As of year 2021 down trend continued to around 87,000 members.

== Beliefs ==
=== Noncreedalism ===
The Brethren have "no creed", but embrace the entire New Testament as their "rule of faith and practice". If a single part of the New Testament is most pointed to as a guide for members' lives, it is the Sermon on the Mount. The early Brethren were very meticulous in applying the New Testament to every situation. For example, they baptize in a forward direction because "we are baptized into his death", and at the moment of his death, Jesus' head fell forward.

When disagreements arise regarding the correct interpretation of New Testament passages or general congregation issues, local congregations go to their regional district conference for resolution. If necessary, the final authority for settling such disputes is the Annual Conference. The minutes of Annual Conference give a clear picture of what matters have been in dispute and how Brethren interpret the New Testament. However, some congregations accept or even encourage individual interpretation of the Bible and their faith.

In keeping with egalitarianism and respect for the individual, evangelism in the Church of the Brethren is practiced by personal demonstration of faith via good works in the world community, and by nonconfrontational witnessing.

Brethren espouse the basic beliefs of Christianity, such as the divinity of Christ. They emphasize peace, simplicity, the equality of believers, and consistent obedience to Christ, and community discernment of scripture. Community, both within and without the church, is promoted, and Brethren often describe themselves in terms of what they do, rather than what they believe, which is consistent with their notion of a lived faith. Brethren also affirm that "faith without works is dead", and are heavily involved in disaster relief and other charitable works.

=== Peace ===
The Church of the Brethren is one of the historic peace churches, which includes Quakers, Amish, Apostolic and Mennonite churches. This is because two of the Brethren's fundamental beliefs are nonviolent resolution of conflict and nonresistance to evil, which they combine with antiwar and peace efforts around the world. The church's commitment to love the enemy and use nonviolence is summarized in its phrase, "all war is sin" (Annual Conference, 1935), and the fact that many Brethren have refused to engage in military service.

During the American Revolution and the American Civil War, Brethren required their members to abstain from military service, believing that obedience to Christ precluded such involvements. Until the early 20th century, Brethren baptismal applicants were required to promise that they would uphold the church's teaching about "being defenseless". During the Second World War, Brethren worked with the government to create a system of alternative service, which would allow conscientious objectors to serve their nation and humanity through nonviolent service. Civilian Public Service was a result of the three historic peace churches collaborating with the U.S. government. While the government provided tools and materials and their work was managed by agencies such as the Soil Conservation or Forest Service, "the historic peace churches funded all the expenses for the men, including food, administrative costs, and a tiny monthly stipend of $2.50" (equivalent to $55 in 2025). Alternative service has evolved into Brethren Volunteer Service, a church agency that places many young people and some older persons in volunteer human-service jobs, usually for a one-year term.

Despite the church's official stance, there are many members of the Church of the Brethren that do not agree with pacifism. This was made particularly evident when, during the Second World War 80% of young Brethren draftees entered active duty in the military. Recent national surveys of the Brethren suggest that only a minority of the current membership views military service as wrong.

=== Priesthood of all believers ===
Brethren follow a nonhierarchical pattern of church life. In the past, most congregations were served by multiple "free" ministers, elected by their own congregations, who supported themselves through other occupations. Today, most congregations have paid pastors, but their function is still somewhat limited, with the laity still taking a very active role in ministerial work.

=== Simplicity ===
Brethren have been urged (and in earlier times compelled) to live a relatively simple lifestyle. At various points in their history, Brethren have been prohibited or discouraged from attending fairs and carnivals, swearing oaths, driving motorized vehicles, attending secular colleges, joining secret societies, filing lawsuits, gambling, and using tobacco or alcoholic beverages.

Simplicity, or nonconformity as it was called until the early 20th century, was once very noticeable in Brethren dress and grooming. Men wore black coats with no collar, and hooks instead of buttons (often referred to as Brethren garb or dressing "in the order"). They would wear beards, but no mustaches. The mustache was seen as a sign of the saloon or the military. Also, the beards were cut in a manner to avoid interference with the kiss of peace. In addition, they wore broad-brimmed black hats.

Women wore long dresses in dark colors, and a white kapp—a prayer covering. Today, Brethren garb is still worn in the most conservative congregations, although some men dress in a simple style by wearing a collared shirt in a single color without a tie, while women in these congregations may continue to practice the use of a prayer covering. The traditional Brethren plain dress is very similar to the clothing of the present-day Amish. The Dunkard Brethren Church, formed in 1926 by conservative members of Church of the Brethren, continues to preserve the traditional Brethren practice of plain dress as do the Old German Baptist Brethren who withdrew during the 1880s.

Most Brethren were well-acculturated by the second half of the 20th century. Today, many members of the church take simplicity to mean living a more ecologically friendly lifestyle by consuming less and being aware of the effect of their choices on the earth and other people (see simple living). In many respects, twenty-first century Brethren lifestyles mirror the lifestyles of their non-Brethren neighbors.

=== LGBTQ inclusion ===
In 2002, the Michigan District licensed and ordained an openly gay pastor, making it the first district to do so in the denomination. However, in 2003, the Annual Conference voted to reject the ordination of openly gay and lesbian pastors.

=== Marriage ===
The Church supports only marriage between a man and a woman.

In 2012, the Church of the Brethren adopted a resolution opposing same-sex marriage, but some congregations protested the resolution and some voted to begin performing same-gender marriages. In 2018, the Atlantic Northeast District rejected a proposal to terminate the credentials of clergy who perform a same-sex marriage because the vote did not receive the necessary two-thirds majority. The Northern Ohio District did approve a policy to terminate the clergy credentials of those pastors who perform same-sex marriage. Virginia's Shenandoah District has similarly withdrawn ordination from ministers who would perform same-sex marriages.

Supportive Communities Network brings together 45 Brethren churches in 2025 that support blessings of same-sex marriage.

=== Abortion ===
Official church statements oppose abortion while committing to "develop constructive, creative alternatives".

== Ordinances ==
The Brethren avoid the use of the term "sacraments", preferring the term "ordinances". This refers to the actions ordered by Jesus Christ and practiced by the early church, believing they are just symbols unlike the early church taught. The Brethren ordinances are:

=== Anointing for healing ===
The person seeking anointing is administered a small amount of oil on his or her forehead. This is followed by the laying on of hands and a prayer for wholeness. This is not to be confused with extreme unction (last rites), since healing is prayed for and expected. Healing is explicitly stated to include emotional and spiritual healing, as well as physical healing.

Anointing and laying on of hands have also been used for other purposes, such as consecrating someone for missions or other special service.

=== Believer's baptism ===
The Brethren believe that believer's baptism is an outward sign of an inward experience of salvation. Hence, baptism is not performed until one is able to understand and accept the message of the gospel, typically at about age 13. In the early years of the denomination, the age at baptism was generally older. The mode of baptism is trine (three times) immersion in a forward direction in the Name of the Father, and in the name of the Son, and in the name of the Holy Spirit. This is followed by laying on of hands for the impartation of the Holy Spirit.

In the early years of the church, people coming into the Church of the Brethren from other denominations were expected to be rebaptized. Today, most congregations will receive members by reaffirmation of faith or by letter of transfer from another congregation or denomination.

=== Love feast ===
The Brethren love feast is a conscious imitation of Jesus' Last Supper with his disciples. It begins with foot washing symbolizing cleansing, humility, and service. They then share a meal, which has symbolized the eschatalogical gathering of the faithful when Christ returns, but currently emphasizes fellowship within the faith community. Finally, they share the bread and cup communion (using unfermented red grape juice), symbolizing participation in Christ's suffering and death. There may also be hymns and a sermon, as well as a preliminary time of self-examination. Usually women and men sit at different tables, but in most congregations, no onus exists on sitting together—by family, child with parent, to avoid crowding a table, so forth. Even though the Love Feast has changed over the years—becoming shorter, more interactive and less somber, and providing alternatives such as hand-washing—it retains the same three components that it has included from the founding of the Brethren.

Congregations typically hold love feast on Maundy Thursday and again on World Communion Sunday in October. Some congregations also have bread-and-cup communion periodically during regular worship services.

== Structure ==
The Brethren practice the "priesthood of all believers", and their structure is egalitarian. Some members still address each other as "Brother Sam" or "Sister Sarah", for example. The practice is more common in the Eastern United States. Even the moderator of Annual Conference, the highest elected office in the church, is addressed as "Brother (or Sister) Moderator".

=== Ministry ===
The term "minister" is understood as both a spiritual and a functional role rather than a hierarchical position of authority. In the early days, most congregations had several ministers chosen ("called" or "elected") by the members of the congregation. The concept of a professional pastor (first explicitly permitted in 1911) slowly became the predominant model, although some congregations still have "free" (nonsalaried) ministers and plural ministry.

Historically, there have been three degrees of ministry in the Church of the Brethren:

- The first degree (now known as a licensed minister) is bestowed on those who are considering serving as ministers. The period of licensure is a time for education and self-examination, after which the individual either advances to ordination or returns to lay status.
- The second degree minister, or ordained minister, is one who intends to continue serving in a ministerial role, usually as a professional pastor, teacher, counselor, or administrator.
- The third degree of minister, also known as an elder, served as a head minister and supervised other ministers in a congregation. By the 1960s, many roles previously reserved for non-salaried elders had been assigned to salaried pastors, leaving elders with little unique ministerial function. So the Annual Conference of 1967 decided that no elders would be elected after that time. Some congregations in the Southern Pennsylvania and Atlantic Northeast Districts still elect elders.

The denomination ordains women as pastors and affirms them for all levels of leadership in the church.

The Brethren also select lay leaders as deacons as in most congregations. They assist in ministerial functions, particularly by tending to the physical and spiritual needs of individual members. Often, a husband and wife serve together as deacons.

=== Officers ===
The leading officers in the Church of the Brethren for business purposes are called moderators. Their principal function is to chair business meetings. There are congregational moderators, district moderators, and an Annual Conference (denominational) moderator.

In current practice, the Annual Conference moderator is elected to a two-year term, serving for the first year as "moderator-elect". An Annual Conference secretary, elected to a five-year term, keeps track of the flow of business. Together, the officers "receive and process the business of Annual Conference, establish and manage agendas ... represent the Conference at district meetings and other appropriate settings, and respond to concerns of denominational members regarding actions and activities of Conference."

=== Boards, committees, and agencies ===
Each congregation selects delegates to serve at an Annual Conference (traditionally called Annual Meeting), which is the final human authority in questions of faith and practice. Issues that cannot be resolved on a local level, or which have implications for the church as a whole are framed as "queries", which are submitted by a congregation to the district (since 1866), and then, if necessary, are passed on to Annual Conference. Standing Committee, a body composed of representatives from each district, processes the business that comes to Annual Conference and makes recommendations. Often a committee is formed to study the matter, and an answer is reported and adopted by a vote of the delegates at a subsequent Annual Conference, although sometimes a query is returned.

The Brethren have numerous boards and committees (sometimes called "teams") that can be either temporary or permanent and either highly focused on one issue (e.g. evangelism) or general in scope. Several agencies are given charge of carrying out the ministries of the church under the auspices of Annual Conference.

At the 2008 Annual Conference of the Church of the Brethren, two of these agencies—the Church of the Brethren General Board and the Association of Brethren Caregivers—were combined into a single entity, the Church of the Brethren, Inc., the ministry arm of which is now known as the Mission and Ministry Board. Headquartered in Elgin, Illinois, its programs include, Global Mission and Service, Brethren Volunteer Service, Youth/Young Adult Ministries, Intercultural Ministries, and Discipleship Ministries. The Messenger periodical, whose roots go back to 1851—making it one of the oldest continually operating church periodicals in the country—is the official magazine of the church.

The general secretary, typically hired for renewable five-year terms, oversees the work of the Church of the Brethren, Inc., and is the chief ecumenical officer of the denomination. Other Annual Conference agencies include Bethany Theological Seminary, Brethren Benefit Trust, and On Earth Peace.

=== Higher education institutions related to the Church of the Brethren ===
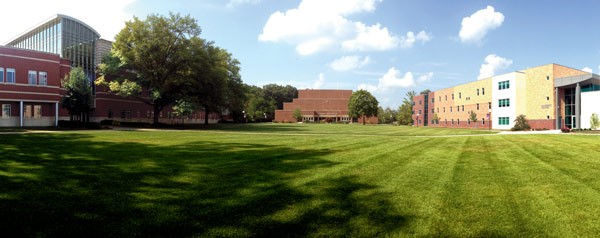
Manchester University at North Manchester, Indiana

- Bridgewater College in Bridgewater, Virginia
- Elizabethtown College in Elizabethtown, Pennsylvania
- Juniata College in Huntingdon, Pennsylvania
- University of La Verne in La Verne, California
- Manchester University in North Manchester, Indiana
- McPherson College in McPherson, Kansas
- Bethany Theological Seminary in Richmond, Indiana
