= Television in the United States =

Television is one of the major mass media outlets in the United States. In 2011, 96.7% of households owned television sets; about 114,200,000 American households owned at least one television set each in August 2013. Most households have more than one set. The percentage of households owning at least one television set peaked at 98.4%, in the 1996–1997 season. In 1948, 1 percent of U.S. households owned at least one television; in 1955, 75 percent did. In 1992, 60 percent of all U.S. households had cable television subscriptions. However, this number has fallen to 40% in 2024.

As a whole, the television networks that broadcast in the United States are the largest and most distributed in the world, and programs produced specifically for American networks are the most widely syndicated internationally. Because of a surge in the number and popularity of critically acclaimed television series in the 2000s and the 2010s, many critics have said that American television has entered a modern golden age; whether that golden age has ended or is ongoing in the early 2020s is disputed.

== Television channels and networks ==
In the United States, television is available via broadcast (also known as "over-the-air" or OTA) and four conventional types of multichannel subscription television: cable, unencrypted satellite ("free-to-air"), direct-broadcast satellite television and Internet Protocol Television (IPTV). OTA is the earliest method of receiving television programming, which only requires an antenna and an equipped internal or external tuner capable of picking up channels that transmit on the two principal broadcast bands, very high frequency (VHF) and ultra high frequency (UHF).

Individual broadcast television stations in the U.S. transmit on either VHF channels 2 through 13 or UHF channels 14 through 36. During the era of analog television, broadcast stations transmitted on a single universal channel; however due to the technical complexities of the present digital television standard, most stations now transmit physically on an RF channel that is mapped to a virtual channel, which – with some exceptions – typically differs from their physical allocation and corresponds to the station's former analog channel. The UHF band originally spanned from channels 14 to 83, though the Federal Communications Commission (FCC) has reduced the bandwidth allocation for UHF three times since then. Channels 70 to 83 were cut for emergency and other telecommunications purposes in 1983. In 2009, channels 52 to 69 were removed by mandate at the completion of the transition from analog to digital television. In 2020, transition away from channels above 36 was completed to make room for its use by telecommunications companies, after a 2017 spectrum auction.

As in other countries, television stations require a license to broadcast legally (which any prospective broadcaster can apply for through the FCC) and must comply with certain requirements (such as those involving programming of public affairs and educational interest, and regulations prohibiting the airing of indecent content) to retain it; the FCC's Board of Commissioners maintains oversight of the renewal of existing station licenses approaching their expiration, with individuals or groups who wish to oppose the granting of a renewal to a licensee based on any disagreement over rule compliance or any other issues inclined to contest it for consideration of revocation. Free-to-air and subscription television networks, however, are not required to file for a license to operate.

Over-the-air and free-to-air television do not necessitate any monthly payments, while cable, direct broadcast satellite (DBS), IPTV and virtual MVPD services require monthly payments that vary depending on the number of channels that a subscriber chooses to pay for in a particular package. Channels are usually sold in groups (known as "tiers"), rather than singularly (or on an a la carte basis). Most conventional subscription television services offer a limited basic (or "lifeline") tier, a minimum base package that includes only broadcast stations within the television market where the service is located, and public, educational, and government access (PEG) cable channels; in many smaller markets, this tier may offer stations from adjacent markets that act as default network affiliates for areas not served by a local affiliate of one or more of the major broadcast networks; however, since the digital television transition in the late 2000s, these have been replaced in some cases by digital subchannels that have agreed to provide a particular network's programming within the local market.

Elevated programming tiers commonly start with an expanded basic package, offering a selection of subscription channels intended for wide distribution (primarily those that launched between the 1970s and the 1990s); since the upspring of digital cable and satellite television during the mid- and late 1990s, additional channels with more limited distribution are offered as add-ons to the basic packages through separate tiers, which are commonly organized based on the programming format of the channels sold in the tier. A la carte subscription services in the US are primarily limited to pay television (more commonly known as "premium") channels that are offered as add-ons to any programming package that a customer of a multichannel video programming distributor (also known as a cable or satellite "system" or "provider") can subscribe to for an additional monthly fee.

=== Broadcast television ===
The United States has a "decentralized", market-oriented television system, particularly in regard to broadcast television. The nation has a national public television service known as the Public Broadcasting Service (PBS). Local media markets have their own television stations, which may either be affiliated with or owned and operated by a television network. Stations may sign affiliation agreements with one of the national networks for the local rights to carry their programming; these contracts can last anywhere from one to ten years, although such agreements often last on average between four and six years. Except in very small markets with a limited number of commercial stations (generally, fewer than five), affiliation agreements are usually exclusive: for example, if a station is affiliated with NBC, it consequently would not air programs from ABC, CBS or other conventional broadcast networks but may carry specialty services intended to be carried on digital television signals on one or more subchannels.

TV Guide is an American magazine that provides television program listings information.

Arrangements in which television stations carried more than one network on its main signal (which often resulted in some network programs being not being cleared to air locally by the station, thereby limiting their national carriage and resulting in viewers having to rely on an out-of-market station receivable in their area that airs the locally pre-empted show through an affiliation with that same network to see it) were more common between the 1940s and the 1960s, although some arrangements continued as late as 2010. Today, programming from networks other than that with which the station maintains a primary affiliation are usually carried over digital subchannels, which increasingly since the mid-2000s, have allowed one of the major broadcast networks to expand their national coverage to markets where they would have previously either had to settle for a secondary affiliation with a full-power television station (which maintain transmitting power as high as 1000 kilowatts and outputs a signal extending as far as 80 miles [130 km] from the transmitter site), or an exclusive or primary affiliation with a low-power station with more limited signal coverage (which maintain a reduced transmitting power not exceeding 100 kilowatts, with a more limited signal radius covering an area 30–60 miles [48–97 km] from the transmitter).

However unlike in other countries, to ensure local presences in television broadcasting, federal law restricts the amount of network programming that local stations can run. Until the 1970s and 1980s, local stations supplemented network programming with a sizeable amount of their own locally produced shows, which encompassed a broad content spectrum that included variety, talk, music and sports programming. Today however, many (though not all) stations produce only local news programs, and in some cases, public affairs programs (most commonly, in the form of news and/or political analysis shows); the remainder of their schedules are filled with syndicated programs, or material produced independently and sold to individual stations in each local market.

The method of most commercial stations – those that rely, at least partly, on advertising for revenue – acquiring programs through distributors of syndicated content to fill time not allotted to network and/or local programming differs from other countries worldwide where networks handle the responsibility of programming first-run and syndicated programs, whereas their partner stations are only responsible for the programming of local content. The international programming model is used in the US by some smaller networks and multicast services, which are more cost-effective for their affiliate stations since they require little to no acquired or locally produced programming to fill airtime at the local level.

The federal government has imposed limits on how many stations an individual owner can hold. The earliest limits restricted owners from holding more than five stations across the entire country, and no more than one in any given market. As of 2017, these limits have been relaxed substantially. Since 1999, an ownership group is now legally allowed to own up to two signals in a market (which can amount to many more actual channels through digital transmission); since the early 1990s, some broadcasters have also used a shell company to circumvent certain ownership restrictions by way of a local marketing agreement; groups can cover up to 78% of the United States with their signals under the "UHF discount" (originally passed in 1985 to benefit UHF television stations that, prior to the 2009 digital transition, often had spotty signal quality), which allows broadcasters to count ownership of UHF stations by 50% of the station's audience reach. (The "discount" was repealed by the FCC under Chair Tom Wheeler and his Democrat-led board in 2015, but was reinstated by Wheeler's successor and former board colleague, Ajit Pai and his fellow Republican commissioners in April 2017.)

All four of the major television networks directly own and operate a number of stations, concentrating mostly on the largest metropolitan areas. The largest ownership group in terms of coverage of the U.S. is the E. W. Scripps Company, whose stations cover 65% of the nation; Scripps primarily operates affiliates of the six major networks, most maintaining full-scale local operations and/or news departments, though its reach greatly expanded in 2021 through its purchase of Ion Media (corporate parent of namesake flagship network Ion Television), whose stations by contrast are entirely centrally operated and do not maintain local programming, which it acquired to have that group's stations serve primarily as pass-through outlets for Scripps' various multicast network properties. Two other ownership groups in particular, Sinclair Broadcast Group and Nexstar Media Group, do not produce network programming (Sinclair has produced original programs for its stations but not on a full-time network including the four multicast services it distributes to its own stations and those owned by partner companies and other unaffiliated group owners) but each own over 150 stations, each covering over three-eighths of the country. In terms of number of stations, Nexstar and Sinclair run first and second, with third place held by Gray Television, whose 131 stations cover mostly smaller metropolitan areas reaching only 10% of the population.

==== Major broadcast networks ====
The four major U.S. broadcast television networks are the National Broadcasting Company (NBC), CBS (an abbreviation for the Columbia Broadcasting System, its former legal name), the American Broadcasting Company (ABC), and the Fox Broadcasting Company (Fox). The first and elder three (which are colloquially known as the "Big Three") began as radio networks: NBC and CBS respectively began operations in 1926 and 1927. ABC was spun off from NBC to Edward J. Noble in 1943 as the Blue Network during FCC inquiries over NBC's dominant share of the American radio market, although the ABC television network would not reach viewership and distribution parity with NBC and CBS until the late 1960s. DuMont Television Network (1948–1956) and NTA Film Network (1956–1961) were early attempts at a "fourth network". Fox, built partly on the remnants of DuMont, is a relative newcomer that began operations in 1986 and expanded its programming through the 1990s. The Paramount Television Network flourished simultaneously with Fox, if less successfully.

All in all, the U.S. broadcasting landscape dramatically evolved towards a conglomeratization of players – an effect also called concentration of media ownership, which describes the narrowing of competition in modern television broadcasting.

Weekday schedules on ABC, CBS, and NBC affiliates tend to be similar, with programming choices sorted by dayparts (Fox does not air network programming outside of prime time other than sports programming that airs on weekends and, on fairly rare occasions, weekdays). Typically, these begin with an early-morning national newscast (such as ABC's America This Morning), followed by a local morning news program; these are typically followed by a network morning program (such as NBC's Today), which usually mixes news, weather, lifestyle segments, interviews and music performances.

Network daytime schedules consist of talk shows and soap operas, although one network – CBS – still carries game shows (a handful of other game shows otherwise air in syndication); local newscasts may air at midday timeslots. Syndicated talk shows are shown in the late afternoon, followed by additional local newscasts in the early evening time period. ABC, CBS and NBC offer network news programs each evening, generally airing at 6:30 or 7:00 p.m. in the Eastern Time Zone (5:30 or 6:00 p.m. in other areas), however these are sometimes subject to pre-emption on weekends and select holidays due to sports programming that overlaps into the time slot, either because the event is scheduled to occur later in the day or extends beyond the set time block. (At the insistence of sports leagues, most televised sporting events are required to be broadcast until their completion. This is partly in reaction to the infamous 1968 "Heidi Bowl" telecast in which NBC interrupted a National Football League (NFL) game between the New York Jets and the Oakland Raiders to air a made-for-television film in its scheduled time slot due to a failure in communications between network executives.)

Local newscasts or syndicated programs fill the "prime access" hour or half-hour (7:00 to 8:00 p.m. in the Eastern and Pacific Time Zones, 6:30 to 7:00 p.m. in other areas), and lead into the networks' prime time schedules, which are the day's most-watched three hours of television. The traditional prime time schedule runs from 8:00 to 11:00 p.m. in the Eastern and Pacific Time Zones and 7:00 to 10:00 p.m. elsewhere, although this varies depending on the network and the day: the four major networks program an additional hour (running from 7:00 to 8:00 p.m. Eastern and Pacific, 6:00 to 7:00 p.m. elsewhere) on Sunday evenings (many Spanish language broadcast networks also program this additional hour to begin their prime time lineups on all seven nights of the week); Fox, The CW and MyNetworkTV, in contrast, do not carry any programming during the 10:00/9:00 p.m. hour and leave that hour for their affiliates to provide programming of their own.

Typically, family-oriented comedy programs led in the early part of prime time, although in recent years, reality television programs (such as Dancing with the Stars and American Idol), and more adult-oriented scripted programs – both comedies and dramas – have largely replaced them. Later in the evening, drama series of various types (such as NCIS, Law & Order: Special Victims Unit and Grey's Anatomy) air. Sunday is the most-watched night on American television, with many of TV's most popular shows airing on that night. Viewership tends to then decline throughout the week, culminating in the lowest ratings being registered on Friday and Saturday night; most broadcast networks abandoned the programming of first-run scripted fare on Saturdays by 2004, in favor of sports, newsmagazines and burn-offs and reruns of other prime time series; however first-run scripted programming continues to air on Fridays, being mixed in with newsmagazines and/or reality series, depending on the network. Networks, however, pay special attention to Thursday night, which is the last night for advertisers of weekend purchases – such as cars, movie tickets and home video rentals – to reach large television audiences. Throughout the 1990s, NBC called its own Thursday night lineup "Must See TV", and during that decade, some of the country's most watched television shows aired on Thursday nights (several of which aired on NBC), before the re-emergence of Sunday as the top night of prime time programming in the 2000s.

At the end of prime time, another local news program is broadcast, usually followed by late-night interview shows (such as The Late Show with Stephen Colbert or The Tonight Show). Rather than sign off in the early pre-dawn hours of the morning (as was standard practice until the early 1970s in larger markets and until the mid-1980s in smaller ones), television stations now fill the time with syndicated programming, reruns of prime time television shows or late local newscasts (the latter becoming less common since the early 2000s), or 30-minute advertisements, known as infomercials, and in the case of CBS and ABC, overnight network news programs. On some stations, syndicated programming may fill timeslots where local newscasts would traditionally air, either due to the station not programming news in certain time periods or because it does not operate a news department; similarly, local news programs in the late evening hours may air during the final hour of prime time (10:00 p.m. in the Eastern and Pacific Time Zones and 9:00 p.m. in all others) and/or during the morning commute period (7:00 to 9:00 or 10:00 a.m. in all time zones), usually on stations affiliated with networks other than those classified as part of the "Big Three" (ABC, NBC and CBS) and those without a network affiliation.

Saturday mornings usually feature network programming aimed at children (traditionally these mainly consisted of animated cartoons and in some cases, live-action scripted series and even game shows targeted at the demographic, although live-action lifestyle, science and wildlife programs have become the norm for the timeslot since 2009, while animated series have primarily been relegated to non-commercial and non-English language networks), while Sunday mornings include a form of public affairs program known as the Sunday morning talk shows (which maintain a "week-in-review" format that focuses primarily on political and socioeconomic issues, and if a particular program's format is more fluid in regards to topical content, other news stories of major interest). Both of these help fulfill stations' legal obligations, respectively to provide educational children's programs (through a law passed in 1990 known as the Children's Television Act, which requires stations to carry a minimum of three hours of programs featuring content benefiting the educational needs of youth each week) and public service programming. Sports and infomercials (and on some stations, syndicated feature film packages) can be found on weekend afternoons, followed again by the same type of prime-time shows aired during the week.

==== Other over-the-air commercial television ====
From 1956 to 1986, the majority of English-language television stations that were not affiliated with the Big Three networks, nor affiliates of National Educational Television nor, arguably, (from 1956 to 1961) the smaller NTA Film Network were "independent," airing only syndicated and some locally produced programming to fill their daily schedules. Many independent stations still exist in the U.S., usually historically broadcasting on the UHF band; however the number of them had drastically decreased (especially within individual markets) after 1995 due to the formation of newer broadcast networks that were created to compete against the four established competitors. Syndicated shows, often reruns of television series currently in or out of production and movies released as recently as three years prior to their initial syndication broadcast, take up much of their schedules.

However, in October 1986, the Fox Broadcasting Company was launched as a challenge to the Big Three networks, with six independent stations that News Corporation (which acquired the 20th Century Fox the year before) had acquired from Metromedia as its cornerstone charter outlets, along with many independents owned by other companies. Thanks largely to the success of shows like The Simpsons, Beverly Hills, 90210 and The X-Files, as well as the network's acquisition of rights to show games from the National Football League's National Football Conference arm in December 1993, Fox has established itself as a major player in broadcast television. However, Fox differs from the three older networks in that it does not air daily morning and nightly news programs or have network-run daytime or weeknight late night schedules (though the network made previous failed attempts at late night programming on Monday through Friday evenings between 1986 and 1993; Fox ceased original late night programming in favor of reruns in 2016). Its nightly prime-time schedule runs only two hours long on Monday through Saturdays and three hours on Sundays (something the network intentionally did to sidestep FCC regulations for television networks in effect at Fox's launch), and some of its major market affiliates used to broadcast on UHF before the digital transition (several affiliates though broadcast on VHF pre-transition, primarily as a result of affiliation deals with former longtime Big Three affiliates owned by now-defunct station groups New World Communications and SF Broadcasting that it signed after acquiring the NFL rights).

Many of its affiliates in mid-size and small markets outsource news production to Big Three affiliates rather than produce their own newscasts, and its flagship stations in New York City and Los Angeles do not include the network's name within their callsigns (Fox's owned-and-operated stations in New York City and Los Angeles instead use the respective callsigns WNYW and KTTV; the WFOX-TV and KFOX-TV calls are respectively used by Fox affiliates in Jacksonville, Florida and El Paso, Texas). Fox's only scheduled news program is Fox News Sunday, which it airs on Sunday mornings; special news coverage on the network comes from the staff of its sister cable network Fox News (which launched in October 1996, around the same time as its affiliate video service Fox NewsEdge), though not every affiliate carries breaking news bulletins from Fox News outside of prime time presidential addresses, and national and international events of utmost urgency. Most of Fox's affiliates now have local newscasts (only a small number of affiliates, mainly based in larger markets, carried news programming prior to the mid-1990s), often scheduled during the final hour of prime time – an hour earlier than newscasts seen on major network stations – at which time they compete with network dramas, rather than other local newscasts (although some news-producing Fox stations also carry newscasts in the traditional late news time period), and for one to three additional hours in the morning that overlap with morning news programs on ABC, NBC and CBS.

Three new networks launched in the 1990s: within six days of each other in January 1995, The WB Television Network (which was originally formed as a venture between Time Warner, Tribune Broadcasting – which made the majority of its independent stations principal charter affiliates of the network – and former Fox executive Jamie Kellner, who served as The WB's original chief executive officer) and the United Paramount Network (UPN; created as a programming partnership between Chris-Craft Industries/United Television and Paramount Television, which had been acquired the year prior by Viacom, which would gain full ownership of UPN five years after the network's launch) were launched primarily to compete against Fox, targeting the same younger demographic (teenagers and young adults 12 to 34) that network had built its success upon during the first half of the decade. In August 1998, Paxson Communications (later Ion Media prior to being bought by Scripps in 2021) launched Pax TV to counterprogram the four larger networks as well as The WB and UPN, with a focus on family-oriented original and acquired programming; due to underperforming viewership in its initial format, Pax relaunched as i: Independent Television (focusing more on reruns and movies aimed at a broader audience) in July 2005 and then as Ion Television in September 2007.

The CW Network was created on September 18, 2006, when CBS Corporation and Time Warner decided to merge UPN and The WB, with The CW also drawing from the latter's broadcast and cable assets and scheduling model (The WB's online assets remained separate, although its former web domain – which was revamped as a streaming service – was shut down in December 2013 and replaced with a promotional website for Warner Bros. Television programs). The CW broadcasts fourteen hours a week of programming in prime time, all airing on Monday through Sundays (the network maintained a three-hour evening lineup on Sundays from 2006 to 2009, when that time was turned over to its affiliates; it reinstated Sunday prime time programming in October 2018), and three hours on Saturday mornings (its children's program block may bleed into the afternoon hours on weekends on a few stations due to other locally scheduled programs). The CW is the only major broadcast network that operates a national programming service feed for smaller markets, The CW Plus (a successor to The WB's group of cable-only affiliates, The WB 100+ Station Group, which launched in September 1998 to provide the network's programming to markets where it would otherwise not be able to gain adequate over-the-air coverage), which, as a cost-effective method that reduces programming responsibilities on prospective affiliate stations, fills airtime not occupied by CW network programming with syndicated programs and infomercials; The CW Plus is distributed via digital subchannel and cable-only affiliates, making it also one of the only networks that has local affiliates that do not broadcast over-the-air.

MyNetworkTV originally started as a national network with a format primarily consisting of English language telenovelas; however, after experiencing continued low ratings for its prime time-exclusive schedule (even after several programming revamps that followed over the next three years after the initial format faltered), it converted into a "broadcast programming service" in September 2009, adopting a format made up of reruns of series originally aired on other networks for ten hours a week on Mondays through Fridays.

Ion broadcasts 24 hours a day, seven days a week (though only eighteen hours of its schedule each day consist of entertainment programming, with infomercials and religious programming making up the remainder of the schedule), making the Ion network the largest English-language commercial television network to be totally responsible for its affiliates' programming. Ion differs from other commercial networks in that the majority of its stations are owned-and-operated by its parent company with very few affiliates, and it is distributed exclusively via cable and satellite in markets where the network does not have a local station; Ion was the last of the seven conventional English language commercial broadcast networks to expand into distribution via digital multicasting, having relied entirely on cable and satellite distribution in markets where it otherwise could not maintain a primary affiliation until 2014, when it began accepting subchannel-only affiliates through deals with Gray Television and Nexstar Media Group.

==== Digital multicast services ====
With the digital television transition, which was completed in two phases in February and June 2009, the use of digital multicasting has given breed to various networks created for distribution on these multiplexed feeds of new and existing stations. However, for the most part, very few of these networks have been able to gain a national reach on parity with many of the conventional commercial and non-commercial networks, in part due to the fact that many stations transmit high definition programming on their main feed in 1080i, which requires a bitrate less compartmentalized for allowing more than one multicast feed (which are generally transmitted in standard definition) without risking diminished picture quality; some alternately transmit their main feed in 720p, which favors multiplexing of more than two subchannels at a time (ATSC 3.0, which began development around the time of the 2009 transition with FCC consideration to replace the current ATSC 1.0 as the technological standard for digital television expected to occur in 2016, uses improved compression technology able to fit additional subchannels on a single programming stream as well as allowing for the transmission of high definition content in the 4K resolution format).

Retro Television Network was among the first networks to be produced specifically for the digital television market; Equity Broadcasting created the network in 2005, originally relying mostly on public domain series before expanding to a broader library of licensed reruns. RTN's initial success was dented by its owner's financial collapse and further difficulties pertaining to its successor, current owner Get After It Media (Luken Communications). The most popular and widely distributed network that uses digital subchannels as its primary form of distribution is MeTV, a classic television network originally launched by station owner Weigel Broadcasting in 2005 as a programming format on one of its flagship television stations in Chicago, WFBT-CA (now WWME-CD), and evolved into a national network in November 2010; MeTV now has affiliations with primary channels in a number of markets (WJLP in the New York City market, WDPN-TV in Philadelphia and Delaware, and WGTA in Atlanta). Both MeTV and its most prominent rival, Nexstar-owned Antenna TV (originally founded in 2010 by Tribune Broadcasting), popularized the format for multicasting that relies on archived programming. This TV (owned by Allen Media Group, and co-founded by Weigel and Metro-Goldwyn-Mayer) used a similar format, focusing on older as well as some relatively recent feature films; it helped to spawn similar movie-oriented broadcast networks such as Movies! (a joint venture between Weigel and Fox Television Stations, which relies primarily on films from the library of the latter's former sister film studio, 20th Century Studios) and GetTV (which mainly airs films from the library of owner Sony Pictures Entertainment).

Demographically focused networks were created during the 2010s; Bounce TV was launched in September 2011 by Martin Luther King III and Andrew Young, featuring a broader general entertainment format aimed at African American adults. Katz Broadcasting, owned by Bounce executive Jonathan Katz and purchased by the E. W. Scripps Company in 2017, launched two gender-focused networks with specific formats in August 2014 – Grit (aimed at men with a lineup heavy on western and action films) and Escape (now Court TV Mystery, aimed at women and featuring mystery and true crime programs) – and a genre-based network in April 2015, Laff (featuring a mix of comedic feature films and sitcoms). Luken Communications is the largest operator of subchannel networks by total number (which are largely carried on low-power outlets), which in addition to the Retro Television Network include among others country and rural themed Heartland, automotive-centered Rev'n, children's network PBJ and a modern version of The Family Channel. Men's network Tuff TV was formerly managed as a Luken network but is now independent.

Other subchannel-based networks include those that also rely on archived programming such as Buzzr (a network focusing of game shows sourced from the programming library of owner Fremantle) and Comet (launched by the Sinclair Broadcast Group and Metro-Goldwyn-Mayer in October 2015, focusing on science fiction series and films sourced from the MGM library), and networks which do not completely if at all rely on archived scripted programming like Court TV (a network developed by Katz/Scripps as a revival of the cable network now known as TruTV, which mainly airs court trial coverage and true crime programming), WeatherNation TV (an independently owned 24-hour weather network which features subchannels as part of its multiplatform distribution model), TheCoolTV and The Country Network (which rely on music videos).

In smaller cities and rural areas, the major broadcast networks may also rely on digital subchannels to be seen in these areas, as the market may not be populous enough to support a financially independent station for each network. As such FCC regulations govern cable providers must provide basic service at a reasonable cost. (Since advent of digital television equipment, the cost is responsibility of the consumer.)

==== Broadcast television in languages other than English ====
===== Spanish =====
Several Spanish language broadcast (as well as cable) networks exist, which are the most common form of non-English television broadcasts. These networks are not as widely distributed over-the-air as their English counterparts, available mostly in markets with sizeable Latino and Hispanic populations; several of these over-the-air networks are alternatively fed directly to cable, satellite and IPTV providers in markets without either the availability or the demand for a locally based owned-and-operated or affiliate station.

The largest of these networks, Univision, launched in 1986 as a successor to the Spanish International Network (which debuted in September 1962, with Spanish language independent stations KMEX-TV in Los Angeles and KCOR-TV (now KWEX-DT) in San Antonio, Texas as its charter stations). It has risen to become the fifth highest-rated television network in the U.S. (behind NBC, CBS, ABC and Fox) and is the dominant Spanish language network in the U.S., with its ratings having risen to levels where it has beaten at least one of its English language competitors since the late 1990s. Although Univision originally featured programming content from a variety of distributors, the network now relies mainly on programs sourced from Mexico's dominant broadcaster, Televisa (which has maintained partial ownership of Univision's corporate parent on and off throughout its history) as well as domestically produced programming.

Its major competition is Telemundo, a sister network of NBC (which acquired Telemundo in 2001) that was also established in 1986 through a consortium of three Spanish-language stations, WNJU/New York City, WBBS-TV/Chicago and KVEA/Los Angeles. It was considered an also-ran to Univision until the late 2000s, when parent company NBCUniversal began heavily investing in its news and entertainment programming. Unlike Univision, the majority of Telemundo's programming is produced specifically for the network. In addition to carrying the traditional programming format for Spanish language broadcasters (which typically incorporates telenovelas, variety series, news, sports and films imported from Latin American countries), also includes dubbed versions of American feature film releases.

Other popular Spanish-language broadcast networks are Univision-owned UniMás, which was launched in January 2002 and is aimed at a younger Hispanic demographic; Azteca, the American version of Mexico's Azteca networks, which debuted in July 2001; TeleXitos aimed at Hispanic and Latino Americans, the network airs a mix of dramatic television series from the 1970s to the 2000s and movies, with all programming consisting of shows dubbed into Spanish; and independent networks Estrella TV (which began as a programming format on Liberman Broadcasting's Spanish language independent stations in the early 2000s and eventually launched nationally in September 2009, featuring a traditional lineup of Latino-focused programming largely produced by Liberman) and LATV (which originated in 2002 as a programming format on KJLA in Los Angeles before becoming a national network in September 2007, and focuses mostly on unscripted music, talk and variety programs). V-me (Spanish pronunciation: [ˈbeme], a pun on veme, "watch me") is a Spanish broadcast television network formerly carried in association with public television stations created for the United States Hispanic market, which is currently pursuing a pay-TV model. V-me delivers drama, music, current affairs, food, lifestyle, nature and educational pre-school content to its viewers.

Currently, The Hispanic Information and Telecommunications Network, Inc. (HITN) is the largest Spanish-language broadcasting network in the United States. It delivers educational programming to over 42 million homes nationwide, and reaches over 40% of U.S. households. Its distribution network includes Comcast, DirecTV, Verizon FiOS, Dish Network, Optimum Communications, U-verse TV, Charter Communications, and a host of smaller distributors. Its stated mission is "to advance the educational, social, cultural, and economic circumstances of Hispanics."

===== Other languages =====
French language programming is generally limited in scope, with some locally produced French and creole programming available in the Miami area (serving refugees from Haiti) and Louisiana, along with some locales along the heavily populated Eastern Seaboard. Francophone areas near the eastern portion of the Canada–United States border generally receive television broadcasts presented in the language from French Canadian networks (such as Ici Radio-Canada Télé and TVA), which are widely available over-the-air but rarely on cable in those areas.

Many large cities also have television stations that broadcast programming in various Asian languages (such as KTSF in San Francisco), especially after the digital television transition, which has allowed some smaller stations in areas with heavy populations of Asian immigrants and American natives of Asian origin fluent in one of that continent's indigenous languages to carry such programming either as primary channel or subchannel affiliations. A few unusual examples of other foreign broadcasters also exist, such as Greek language WZRA-CD in Florida and Polish language WPVN-DT4 in Chicago.

There have also been a few local stations that have broadcast programming in American Sign Language, accompanied by English closed captioning. Prior to the development of closed captioning, it was not uncommon for some public television programs to incorporate ASL translations by an on-screen interpreter. An interpreter may still be used for the deaf and hard-of-hearing community for on-air emergency broadcasts (such as severe weather alerts given by local governments) as well as televised press conferences by local and state government officials accompanied by closed captioning.

==== Non-commercial television ====
Public television has a far smaller role in the United States than in most other countries. The United States does not, as of 2025, offer a national television service direct to the consumer. NASA TV, operated by NASA, provided linear feeds of content related to the United States space program and educational content from 1980 to 2024. The United States Department of Defense produced the Pentagon Channel (later renamed DoD News Channel), a military news outlet that operated from 2004 to 2015. In addition, Agency for Global Media content (the most well-known being Voice of America) was available to U.S. consumers from the partial repeal of the Smith–Mundt Act in 2013 until the Agency was defunded and shut down in 2025; VOA and its sister outlets were likewise restricted to shortwave and Internet broadcasts. Content from the National Weather Service (such as loops of NEXRAD imagery and NOAA Weather Radio feeds) is frequently repurposed for television.

The Public Broadcasting Service is the largest public television broadcaster in the United States, originating in October 1970 as the successor of National Educational Television (which was established in 1954). Unlike the commercial networks, PBS does not officially produce any of its own programming; instead, individual PBS stations (most notably, WNET in Newark, New Jersey/New York City, WGBH-TV in Boston and WETA-TV in Washington, D.C.), station groups and affiliated producers create programming and provide these through PBS to other affiliates. While it does provide a base slate of programming to its member stations (which is limited to roughly thirteen hours a week of programming in prime time, airing on Sunday through Fridays with fewer programs on Thursday and Friday evenings, as well as daytime children's programming during the morning and afternoon), PBS does not schedule all programs it supplies in set time slots, giving its members leeway in scheduling these programs in time slots of their choosing. Like the six larger commercial English language broadcast networks, its member stations handle the responsibility of programming time periods where programming supplied by the service is not broadcast, which are filled by cultural and public affairs programming of relevance to their market or region of service, and syndicated programs of various genres.

Most (but, by no means, all) public television stations are members of PBS, sharing programs such as Sesame Street, NOVA and Masterpiece Theatre. Although many PBS stations operate individually, a number of states – such as Wisconsin, Maryland, Minnesota, Oklahoma and South Carolina – have state-owned public broadcasting authorities that operate and fund all public television stations in their respective states. The Alabama Educational Television Commission, licensee for the nine stations comprising Alabama Public Television, was established by the Alabama Legislature in 1953. In January 1955, WCIQ on Mount Cheaha began operation as the nation's ninth non-commercial television station. Four months later in April 1955 with the sign-on of WBIQ in Birmingham, Alabama became the first state in the country with an educational television network. Alabama Public Television was a model for other states in the nation and for television broadcasters in other countries. 25 other states copied Alabama's system of operation to provide service through multiple, linked television stations, using full-power satellite stations and (in some cases) low-power translators to relay the originating station's programming to other areas. Similar state networks have also been created by commercial broadcasters to relay network programming throughout portions or even the entirety of a state.

The federal government previously subsidized non-commercial educational television stations through the Corporation for Public Broadcasting, before that agency was also defunded in 2025 and the corporation dissolved. Even during the CPB's existence, the income received from the government was insufficient to cover expenses, and stations rely on corporate sponsorships and viewer contributions (including from private benefactors) to finance their operations and programming production. Various public television outlets – albeit not on all individual PBS member and independent public broadcasting stations and PBS member networks simultaneously – hold pledge drives two to four times per year, which account for a substantial portion of the non-government-subsidized income through public and private contributions.

American public television stations air programming that commercial stations do not offer, such as educational (including cultural and arts) and public affairs programming. There are also a number of syndicators dealing exclusively or primarily with public broadcast stations, both PBS and independent public television stations (most prominently, American Public Television). Additionally, there are a number of smaller networks feeding programming to public stations – including World, First Nations Experience (focusing on Native American and indigenous programing), and Create (focusing on lifestyle, travel, cooking and how-to programs) – primarily through digital multicasting; the German public broadcaster Deutsche Welle has also provided blocks of programming to a variety of affiliates in the U.S., and increasingly feeds from other national broadcasters (including Deutsche Welle's DW-TV) have been distributed through digital subchannels belonging to public stations in the U.S. New York City's municipally owned broadcast service, NYC Media, creates original programming that airs in several markets. Few cities have major municipally owned stations.

Many religious broadcast networks and stations exist, also surviving on viewer contributions and time leased to the programming producers; the two most prominent are the Trinity Broadcasting Network, which was founded in 1973 by Paul and Jan Crouch as a part-time ministry that leased programming time on KBSA (now UniMás owned-and-operated station KFTR-DT) in the Los Angeles exurb of Ontario, California, before moving to KLXA-TV (now KTBN-TV) in Fontana, which it began purchasing time on in the following year after KBSA was sold; it gradually became the most widely distributed Christian television network in the world with 20 networks (including five in the United States that are primarily available through multicasting, The Church Channel, the youth-oriented JUCE TV and Smile of a Child TV, and the Latino-oriented TBN Enlace USA and TBN Salsa) and several affiliates internationally; and the Daystar Television Network, founded in 1993 by Marcus and Joni Lamb, when the former's Word of God Fellowship ministry purchased the license of defunct UHF station KMPX (now an Estrella TV owned-and-operated station) in Dallas, Texas. Most of their stations are owned by the television ministries directly or through subsidiary companies (Community Educational Television and Word of God Fellowship, respectively) used by them to operate stations that TBN and Daystar cannot own outright due to FCC regulations prohibiting individual broadcasting companies from owning television stations reaching more than 39% of all U.S. television markets.

Other Christian broadcasters include the Three Angels Broadcasting Network (associated with the Seventh-day Adventists), Cornerstone Television, World Harvest Television (WHT), Hope Channel, Amazing Facts Television, The Word Network, The Worship Network and Total Christian Television. These networks rely mainly on overt televangelism from church services or other religious teaching series for programming, although they also incorporate faith-based children's programming and also air religious-themed feature-length films. Other religions outside of evangelical Christianity also have television outlets, including the predominantly Roman Catholic-oriented Eternal Word Television Network (EWTN), Jewish Life Television (JLTV), and the LDS-affiliated Brigham Young University Television (byuTV). Several predominantly religious broadcasters carry some secular, usually family-friendly, programming in addition to the overt televangelism; byuTV runs family comedies, WHT runs classic Westerns, the Christian Television Network and Total Living Network operate "lifestyle" channels with secular home, garden and human interest programming, and JLTV runs classic comedy reruns from Jewish entertainers.

Spanish-language religious networks ESNE (Roman Catholic), Almavision (Christian), Vision Latina (Iglesia Universal), Esperanza TV, 3ABN Latino, and Enlace (Christian) provide religious programming to the Spanish-speaking viewers across the United States with sermons, discussions and music.

Public access television is a noncommercial form of television required by law to be offered to cable television consumers, in which members of the public are free to place their programming on the cable service. It is a subset of public, educational and government access. Most popular in the 1980s and early 1990s, the rise of the Internet and subscription satellite television (the latter of which is not required to carry public-access television services) has forced it to evolve.

=== Cable and satellite television ===
While pay television systems existed as early as the late 1940s, until the early 1970s, cable television only served to distribute distant over-the-air television stations to rural areas not served by stations that are based locally. This role was reflected in the original meaning of the CATV acronym, "community antenna TV". In that decade, national networks that exclusively transmitted via cable and maintained their own individual programming formats began to launch, while cable system franchises began operating in major cities with over-the-air television stations. By the mid-1970s, some form of cable television was available in almost every market that already had over-the-air television service. Today, most American households receive cable television, and cable networks collectively have greater viewership than broadcast networks, even though individual programs on most of the major commercial broadcast networks often have relatively higher viewership than those seen on cable channels.

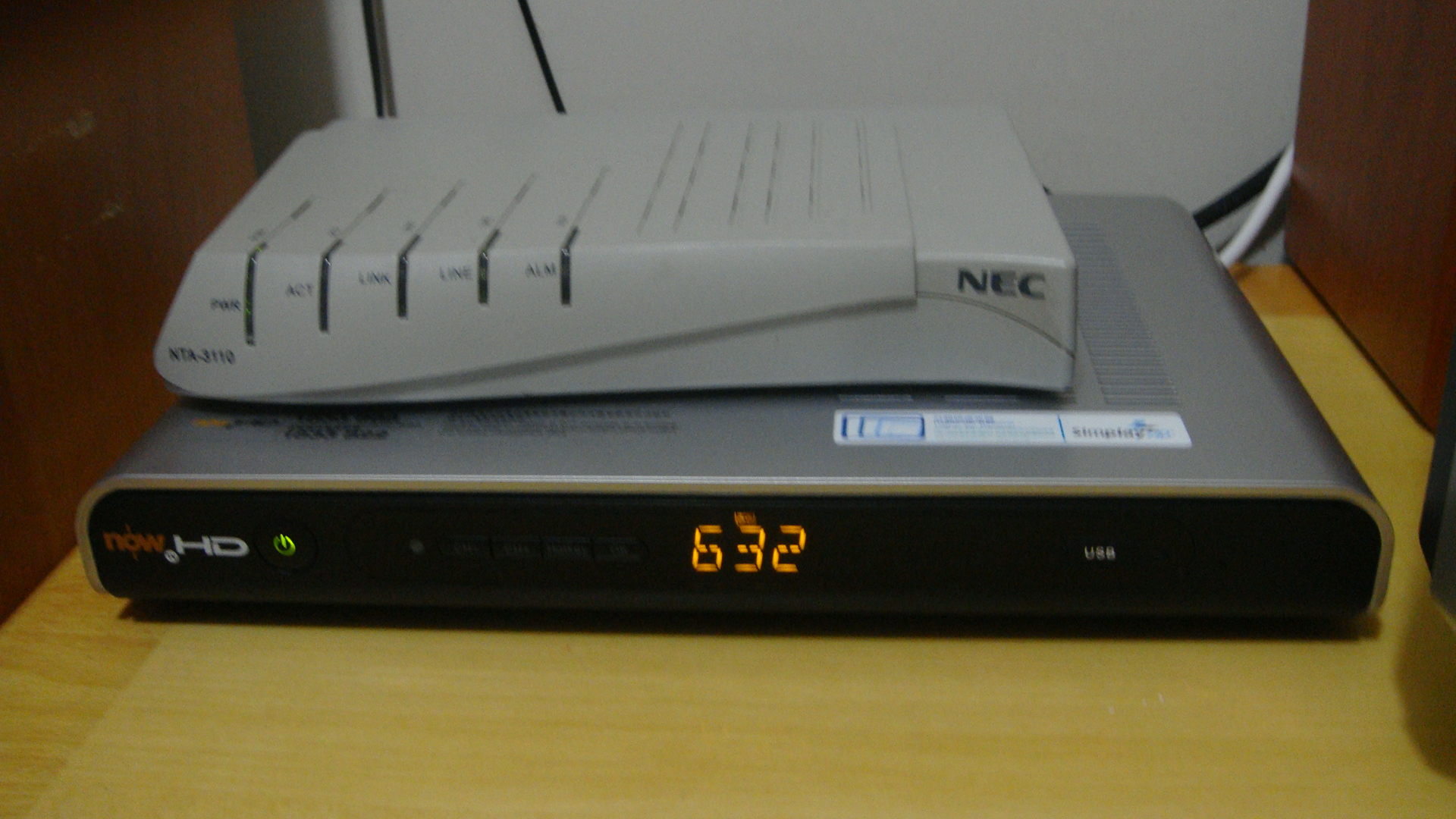
The bottom product is a set-top box, an electronic device which cable subscribers use to connect the cable signal to their television set

The oldest-existing cable-originated television channel as well as the first successful premium cable (or "pay-cable") service is Home Box Office (HBO), which was also the first television network intended for cable distribution on a regional or national basis. HBO launched on November 8, 1972, to 365 Service Electric Cable subscribers in Wilkes-Barre, Pennsylvania, with a mix of movies, sports, and comedy and music specials. For its first three years of operation, it used microwave technology to transmit its programming to CATV and MMDS providers in Pennsylvania and New York. On September 30, 1975, beginning with its telecast of the "Thrilla in Manila" boxing match between Muhammad Ali and Joe Frazier, HBO became the first television network to use communications satellites to transmit its programming, immediately expanding its distribution to UA Columbia Cablevision's Fort Pierce and Vero Beach, Florida, systems and the American Television and Communications Corporation system in Jackson, Mississippi.

The first basic cable network was Atlanta, Georgia independent station WTCG (channel 17), which was uplinked to satellite on December 17, 1976, months after station owner Ted Turner reached an agreement with media executive Howard H. Hubbard to set up a cable network via satellite transmission. Turner's decision to distribute his station – which subsequently had its call sign changed to WTBS (for "Turner Broadcasting System") – via satellite enabled WTCG to be received nationwide, especially in markets that did not have a local independent station or did not receive an out-of-market independent. In 1981, Turner Broadcasting split the Atlanta broadcast feed of WTBS from the satellite-delivered cable feed and began marketing the channel to cable providers as a "free market superstation". (The broadcast and cable feeds, however, simulcast one another with certain exceptions until October 2007, when Turner Broadcasting – which was acquired by Time Warner in 1996 – decided to separate the programming on both feeds, therefore making TBS a cable-exclusive entertainment network with a principal focus on comedy, and reformatting the Atlanta signal under the WPCH-TV call letters).

Turner's move pioneered the superstation concept, which precipitated other independent stations – most notably, WGN-TV in Chicago and WOR-TV (now MyNetworkTV owned-and-operated station WWOR-TV) in New York City – to uplink their signals to satellite for redistribution by cable systems outside the station's primary coverage area. (The practice has since been restricted by the FCC, although six stations that achieved superstation coverage prior to the ban [including WPCH] maintain grandfather clauses to continue offering their programming throughout the United States and Canada.) Other national superstations followed WTBS's lead in implementing a separate national feed that incorporated substitute programming for shows seen in the originating market that local stations declared themselves to be the exclusive carriers in their market after syndication exclusivity regulations went into effect in January 1990. Since WGN America (the former national feed of WGN-TV, which began converting into a news channel as NewsNation in March 2021) converted into a conventional cable channel in 2014, no national superstations exist in the United States and the six remaining regional superstations are limited to distribution via Dish Network and C-band satellite as well as through limited distribution on cable providers in their associated regions of the U.S.

The second basic cable network, the first to operate as a cable-originated outlet and the first such network to be uplinked via satellite from launch was the CBN Satellite Network, launched in April 1977 by televangelist Pat Robertson as the television ministry of his Christian Broadcasting Network. By the time it reformatted as the CBN Cable Network in 1981, it refocused towards secular family-oriented programming, carrying a mix of reruns of classic television series and feature films alongside its religious programming. The network changed its name to The CBN Family Channel in 1988 (revised to The Family Channel in 1990, after CBN spun it off into the indirectly related International Family Entertainment), focusing more on family entertainment programs and reducing reliance on religious programs; this shift towards an entertainment format was more pronounced in its subsequent formats as Fox Family (following its 1998 purchase by News Corporation), ABC Family (after its 2001 sale to ABC parent The Walt Disney Company) and Freeform (to which it was renamed in January 2016 to signify its shift toward a broad schedule of family-oriented shows as well as series of appeal to teen and young adult audiences).

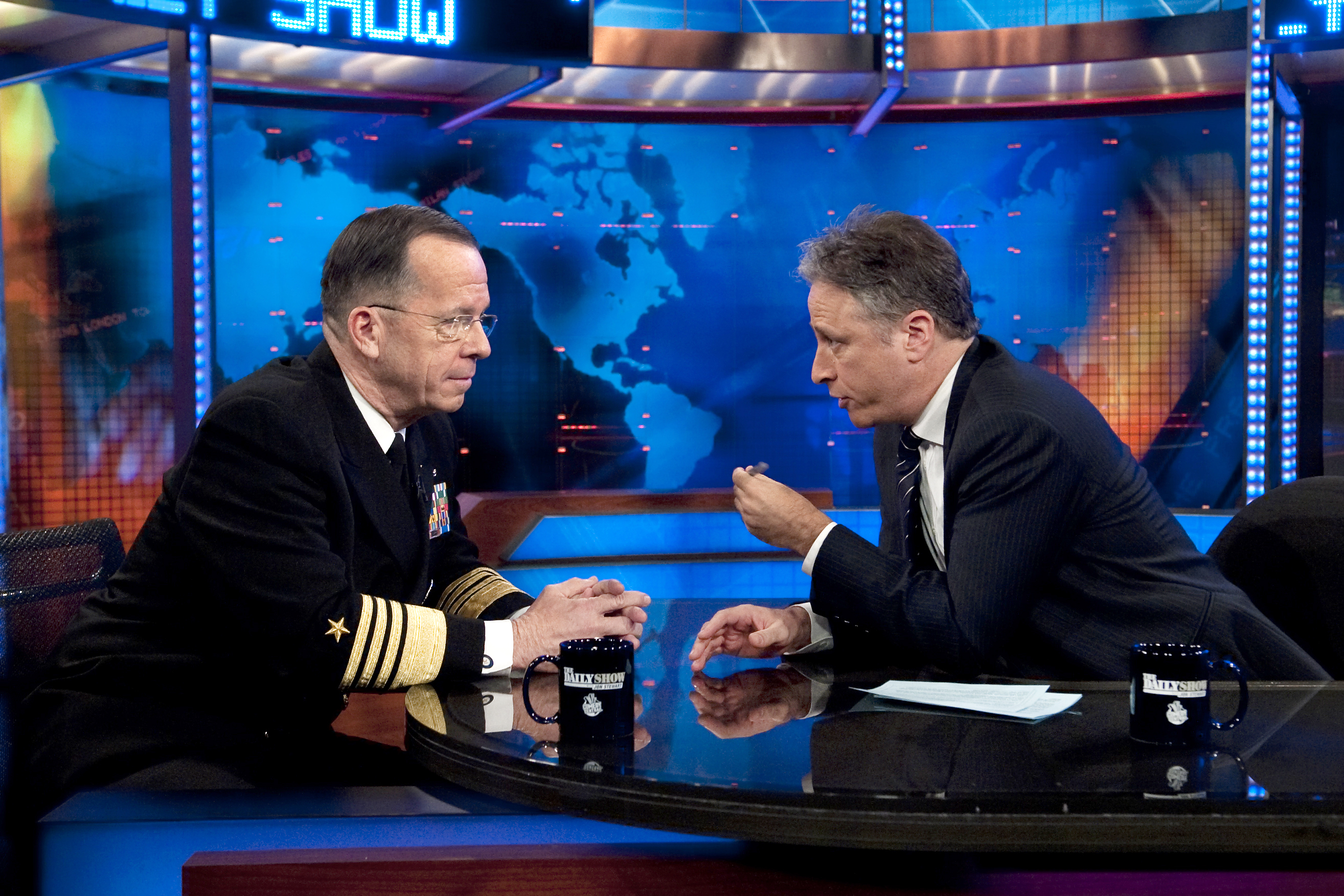
Jon Stewart (right) hosting an episode of The Daily Show in 2010 with Admiral Michael Mullen

Unlike broadcast networks, most cable networks air the same programming nationwide. Top cable networks include USA Network (which maintains a general entertainment format), ESPN and FS1 (which focus on sports programming), MTV (which originally focused on music videos when it launched in April 1981, but now largely features music-related, original scripted and reality television programming), CNN, MSNBC and Fox News Channel (which are dedicated news channels with some opinion and other feature-driven programming), A&E (a network created through the 1984 merger of arts-and-culture-oriented channels ARTS and The Entertainment Channel, which now focuses on non-fiction programs and reality docuseries), Syfy (which focuses on science fiction and fantasy programming), Disney Channel, Nickelodeon and Cartoon Network (which focus on children's programming, although the latter two run nighttime blocks aimed at a teen and adult audience, Nick at Nite and Adult Swim), Discovery Channel and Animal Planet (which focus on reality and documentary programs), AMC (which originally began as a classic film-focused movie channel in October 1984, and now focuses on a mix of feature films and original series), Turner Classic Movies (which focuses on older theatrical feature films), E! (which originally focused on the entertainment industry, but now largely focuses on pop culture shows, films and reality series), Bravo (which began in 1982 as a premium channel focusing on international films and arts programming, but now focuses mostly on reality series and mainstream films), TNT and FX (also general entertainment networks, with some focus on drama) and Lifetime (which targets at a female audience, with a mix of television films, and original and acquired comedy, reality and drama series).

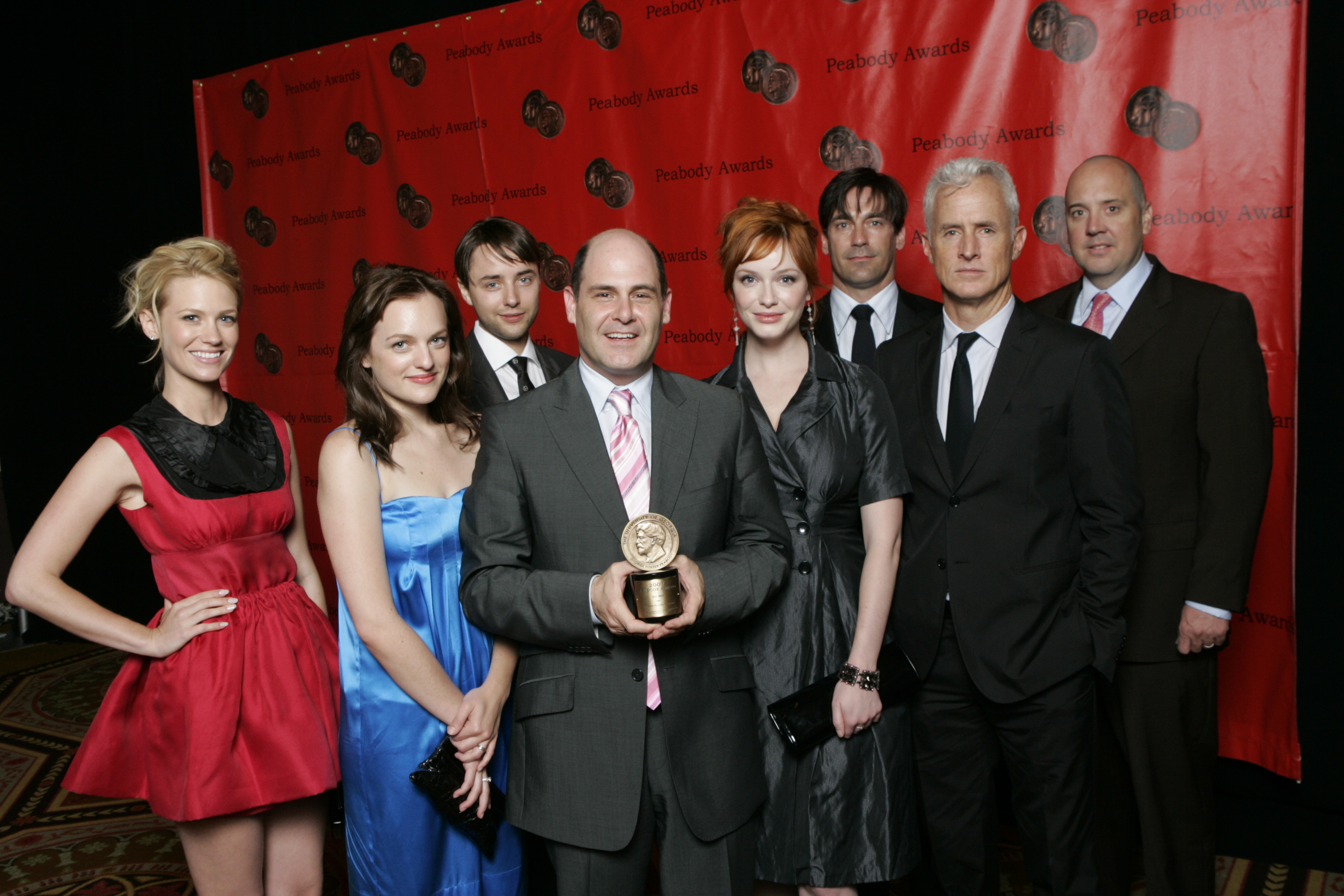
Matthew Weiner and the cast of Mad Men at the 67th Annual Peabody Awards

Premium channels – cable networks that subscribers have to pay an additional fee to their provider to receive – began launching in the 1970s and initially grew in popularity as it allowed subscribers to watch movies without time or content editing common with over-the-air television broadcasts of theatrically released feature films and without interruptions by advertising. While HBO continues to feature theatrical films and specials, the service eventually became one of the first cable channels to successfully venture into original programming; by the late 1990s, HBO began to be known for groundbreaking first-run series (such as The Larry Sanders Show, The Sopranos and Sex and the City) that were edgier and more risque in content than those allowed to air on broadcast networks. Other pay-extra networks launched in the years subsequent to HBO's launch including Showtime, which launched on September 16, 1976, with a similar format; and movie-oriented services such as Star Channel (which launched in April 1973, and later became The Movie Channel in November 1979) and HBO-owned Cinemax (which launched on August 1, 1980, and later became more known for its late-night softcore pornographic films). Although attempts at such services date back to the 1950s, pay-per-view services (such as Viewer's Choice and Request TV) began launching in the mid-1980s, allowing subscribers to purchase movies and events on a one-time-only basis via telephone; with the advent of digital cable, interactive technologies allowed pay-per-view selections to be purchased by remote.

In addition to sports networks that are distributed to a national audience, two other types of sports-oriented television networks exist. Regional sports networks are cable outlets designed to cover a limited geographic region and metropolitan area, which carry events from local professional and collegiate sports teams, as well as team-related programs, news and magazine programs. The most prominent of these are Bally Sports, NBC Sports Regional Networks, AT&T SportsNet and Spectrum Sports, which comprise multiple networks serving different regions of the United States. Independently owned regional sports networks also exist in some regions served by one of the major groups. Out-of-market sports packages, meanwhile, are composed of individual multichannel packages broadcasting events from an individual sport that are carried by regional sports networks, and national and local broadcasters that hold rights to individual teams or sports leagues; the out-of-market sports package is the most expensive form of a la carte television service, ranging in price from $50 to $75 per month.

==== Transmission and technology ====
The national cable television network became possible in the mid-1970s with the launch of domestic communications satellites that could economically broadcast television programs to cable operators anywhere in the continental United States (some domestic satellites also covered Alaska and Hawaii with dedicated spot beams). Until then, cable networks like HBO had been limited to regional coverage through distribution over expensive terrestrial microwave links leased from the telephone companies (primarily AT&T). Satellites were generally used only for international (i.e., transoceanic) communications; their antennas covered an entire hemisphere, producing weak signals that required large, expensive receiving antennas. The first domestic communications satellite, Westar 1, was launched in 1974. By concentrating its signal on the continental United States with a directional antenna, Westar 1 could transmit to TVRO ("television receive-only") dishes only a few meters in diameter, well within the means of local cable television operators. HBO became the first cable network to transmit programming via satellite in September 1975.

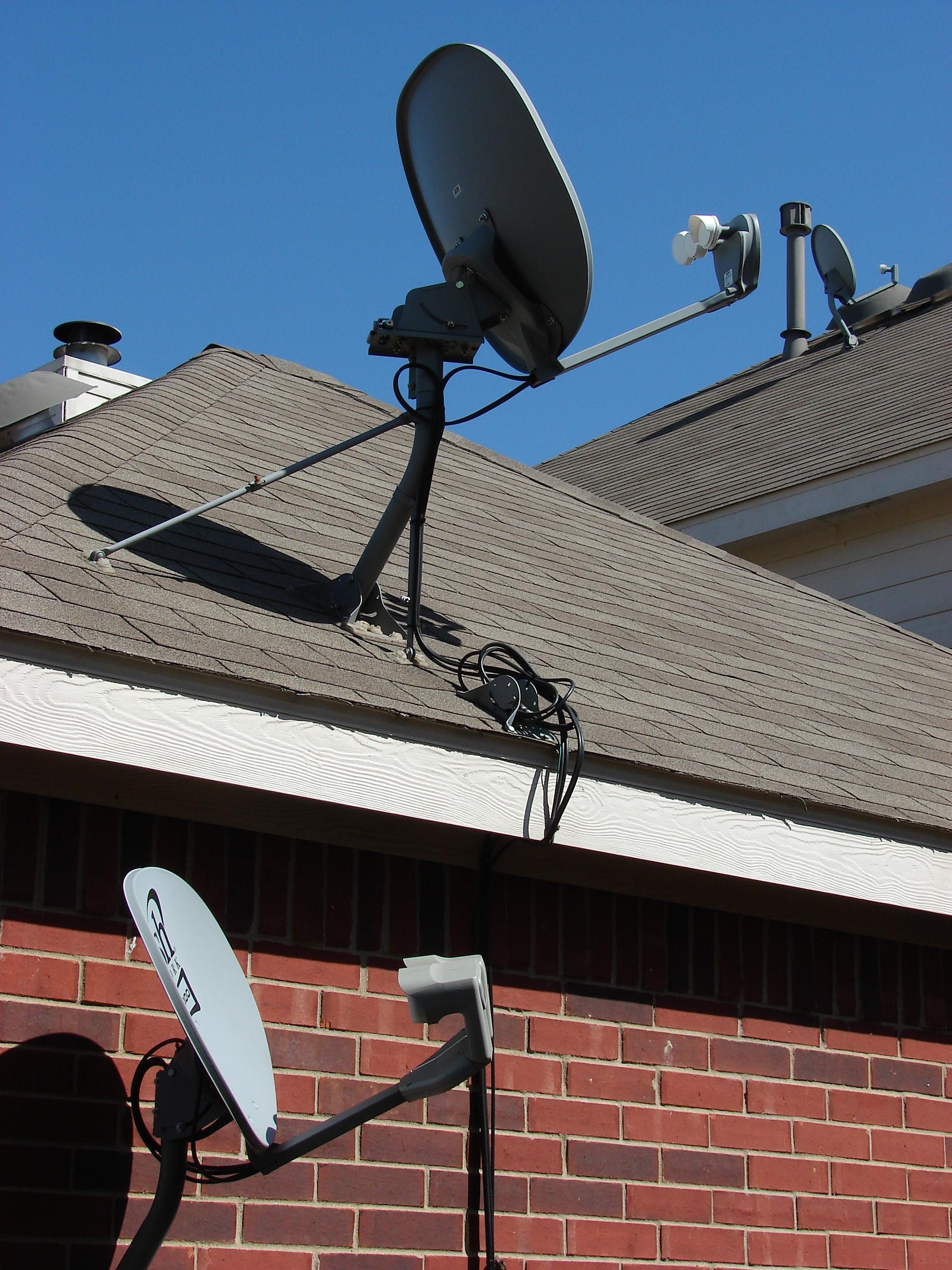
Satellite TV receiver dishes

Cable system operators now receive programming by satellite, terrestrial optical fiber (a method used primarily to relay local stations based within metropolitan areas to the franchise, and acts as a backup for the system operator if a broadcast station's over-the-air signal is affected by a power outage or other technical malfunction involving the main transmitter), off the air (a method used to relay broadcast stations to cable franchises in outlying areas and satellite providers), and from in-house sources and relay it to subscribers' homes. Usually, local governments award a monopoly to provide cable television service in a given area. By law, cable systems must include local broadcast stations in their offerings to customers.

Enterprising individuals soon found they could install their own satellite dishes and eavesdrop on the feeds to the cable operators. The signals were transmitted as unscrambled analog FM feeds that did not require advanced or expensive technology. Since these same satellites were also used internally by the television networks, they could also watch programs not intended for public broadcast such as affiliate feeds without commercials and/or intended for another time zone; raw footage from remote news teams; advance transmissions of upcoming programs; and live news and talk shows during breaks when those on camera might not realize that anyone outside the network could hear them.

Encryption was introduced to prevent people from receiving pay content for free, and nearly every pay channel was encrypted by the mid-to-late 1980s. (This did not happen without protest, such as an incident in which a Florida satellite dealer intercepted the signal of HBO during a film telecast in 1986 to transmit a text-based message over color bars objecting to the network's decision to encrypt its feed.) Satellite television also began a digital transition, well before over-the-air broadcasting did the same, to increase satellite capacity and/or reduce the size of the receiving antennas; this also made it more difficult for individuals to intercept these signals. Eventually, the industry began to cater to individuals who wanted to continue to receive satellite television (and were willing to pay for it) in two ways: by authorizing the descrambling of the original satellite feeds to the cable television operators, and with new direct broadcast satellite television services using their own satellites. These latter services, which began operating in the mid-1990s, offer programming similar to cable television.

DirecTV and Dish Network are the major DBS providers in the country, with 20 and 14 million customers respectively as of February 2014. Meanwhile, the major cable television providers are Comcast with 22 million customers, Spectrum Cable with 11 million, and Cox Communications, Charter Communications, AT&T U-verse and Verizon FiOS with five to six million each.

Although most networks make viewers pay a fee to receive their programming, some networks broadcast using unencrypted feeds. After broadcast television switched to a digital infrastructure, new channels became available on unencrypted satellites to bring more free television to Americans; some of these are available as a digital subchannel to local broadcasters, this reason may be for the expensive costs of the DVB-S equipment. NASA TV, Pentagon Channel, Antenna TV, This TV, TheCoolTV and the Retro Television Network (through its affiliates) are examples, international news channels like NHK World, France 24, i24news and Al Jazeera English until the launch of Al Jazeera America are commonly watched this way as a result to the lack of availability on cable, DBS and IPTV.

Some cable providers use interactive features built into set-top boxes leased to their subscribers to distribute video on demand services within their internal networks. Many providers of subscription television services – both networks and system operators – also have TV Everywhere services, which usually mix the video on demand model with live streaming capabilities (allowing viewers to watch broadcasts from over-the-air networks and stations, and cable channels in near real-time), but require password and username authentication through participating pay television providers.

=== Internet services ===
Streaming television is similar to a cable subscription model, but instead of the set-top box receiving information via a dedicated wire, video is transmitted over the public Internet or private Internet Protocol-based network to a set-top box or in some cases directly to an enabled television.

OTT, or Over-the-top content bypasses multiple system operators entirely, and allows viewing of programs hosted by independent providers. Internet television, also known as web television, began in the 1990s and has become popular in the 2000s onward, resulting in a trend of cord-cutting – the canceling of cable subscriptions in favor of online content that consumers supplement with either over-the-air broadcasts, DVD rentals or a combination of all three viewing methods.

Web television providers in the U.S. include Netflix (which was originally structured as a mail-order DVD rental service), Hulu, MyTV, and many international websites such as YouTube, Myspace, Newgrounds, and Crackle. In addition, services like Vudu, Apple TV, and Amazon Prime Video are digital services that you can buy a movie or a collection of movies and shows for payment or rent. Streaming services such as Disney+, HBO Max, and Peacock allow people to watch all the shows and movies in their catalog for a price every month or year. Viewers can watch these programs from any web browser, whether on a desktop computer, laptop, tablet, smartphone, or a Smart TV. Mobile television services also include mobile apps for both traditional and new programming providers, usually optimized for a small screen and mobile bandwidth constraints. Mobile video is available for direct download or streaming (usually for a one-time download fee) from the iTunes Store, Google Play and Amazon Prime Video.

Internet-connected video game consoles and dedicated Smart TV boxes are available that connect televisions to Internet television and/or online video services. These devices are marketed as more convenient for consumers who would otherwise have trouble connecting a computer to a full-size television and using a web browser to view content. Some televisions have built-in capabilities; dedicated boxes include Android TV, Apple TV, Roku, Amazon Fire TV, Netgear Digital Entertainer, Amkette EvoTV and formerly the Nexus Q and Google TV. Devices that require a PC and television include Windows Media Center Extender, HP MediaSmart Connect, Boxee and Hauppauge MediaMVP.

Aereo provided a cloud-based digital video recorder service for over-the-air broadcasts, which it also streamed; although it and the similarly structured FilmOn have run into legal problems with broadcasters who accused the services of transmitting programs from broadcast television stations in violation of copyrights. Although Aereo and FilmOn both stated that their use of "miniature" antennas for transmission of programs to individual users is legal, following mixed decisions by circuit courts that declared them either legal or in infringement of copyrights, the U.S. Supreme Court ruled in July 2014 that Aereo's business model had an "overwhelming likeness to cable companies," and its transmission of local station signals constituted an unauthorized public performance in violation of copyright rules, forcing Aereo and FilmOn to stop transmitting local stations from several markets. Aereo eventually suspended operations and filed for bankruptcy in November of that year, later choosing to auction off its assets and technology; FilmOn however remains in operation, offering other free-to-air U.S.-based networks in addition to its own exclusive channels, but was found in contempt by New York district court in July 2014 for briefly continuing to stream U.S. stations after the Supreme Court ruling.

Over-the-top subscription services that mirrored cable and TV Everywhere services began emerging in the mid-2010s. In 2015, Dish Network and Sony respectively launched Sling TV and PlayStation Vue, cable-style online and mobile streaming services priced at lower monthly rates than packages offered by traditional pay television system operators. Each include slimmed down tiers of cable and satellite-originated networks from a relatively limited number of network owners. Sling TV, in an effort to cap programming costs, does not include local broadcast stations or regional sports networks; conversely, PlayStation Vue does carry ABC-, NBC-, CBS- and Fox-affiliated stations in select cities where the service is available. PlayStation Vue shut down on January 30, 2020. YouTube TV and Philo are other examples of OTT services.

Conventional broadcast and cable networks also launched OTT services during 2014 and 2015 to primarily reach cord-cutters – most of which are younger adults, particularly around college age, and to combat online copyright infringement of their programming. These networks include CBS (launched CBS All Access in October 2014, featuring both on-demand content and live streams of the network's owned-and-operated stations and affiliates), HBO (in April 2015, launched HBO Now, a standalone internet-only subscription service similar to its TV Everywhere service HBO Go), and Showtime (which launched a VOD/live streaming service of the same name in May 2015).

Most of these services were initially subscription-based. Free, advertising-supported streaming services such as Pluto TV, Local Now and Tubi are also available. These services generally do not offer most of the high-profile original content available on cable, satellite or subscription video services and instead package reruns and other archival programming into online-exclusive channels and other limited content.

Licensing and distribution companies such as Funimation, VIZ Media, Aniplex of America, Discotek Media, NIS America, Media Blasters, Eleven Arts, AnimEigo, Sentai Filmworks, GKIDS, Crunchyroll in North America, Madman Entertainment, Manga Entertainment, Anime Limited, Siren Visual, and Hanabee Entertainment in Australia and the United Kingdom, and even mainstream streaming services like Netflix and Hulu have sections, streaming services, and content within the streaming services with foreign media such as anime, manga, J-Pop concert recordings, and Asian drama. Some of them also include digital stores where you can buy branded merchandise on their websites.

== The business of television ==
The main characters in Frasier selling U.S. Treasury Bonds

Over-the-air (OTA) commercial stations and networks generate the vast majority of their revenue from advertisements. According to a 2001 survey, broadcast stations allocated 16 to 21 minutes of programming time per hour to commercials. Most cable networks also generate income from advertisements, although most basic cable networks also receive subscription fees, which are the other main source of revenue for the cable operators. However, premium cable networks (such as HBO) do not air commercials; instead, cable television subscribers must pay an extra fee to receive this type of pay television service.

Networks traditionally allocate a portion of commercial time during their programs (usually totaling between five and 6 1/2 minutes per hour, depending on the length of the program being aired, sometimes less during sporting events) to their local affiliates, which allow the local stations to generate revenue. In the same manner, in addition to subscription fees, cable television providers generate some of their revenue by selling local commercial time (usually allocating around four minutes per hour) for each advertiser-supported cable network it carries. However, while much of this time is sold to local and national advertisers, portions of the allocated commercial time are reserved by network affiliates and cable providers for in-house advertising (cable providers use some of this time to carry commercials for their services, which may also include business solutions, residential telephone and broadband internet services; network affiliates, as do other commercial broadcast stations, use this reserved time to carry promotions for their programming or station imaging).

Cable companies are required by the 1992 Cable Television Consumer Protection and Competition Act to negotiate for retransmission consent, usually paying broadcasters for the right to carry their signals. This provision, over time, has resulted in problems between pay television providers and companies that own subscription television services as well as those own and/or operate over-the-air television stations, as disagreements over terms in retransmission contracts sometimes arise during negotiations to renew and (occasionally) strike new agreements to carry certain channels. The carriage disputes that occur because of these differences typically result in broadcast stations or cable channels being pulled for a protracted period of time, often due to carriage fee increases that a provider may consider to be too expensive (since retransmission consent fees are a form of subscriber fee, any increase in fees that a provider carries will be passed on to the subscriber, which providers are hesitant to do out of concern that it may result in subscriber defections due to the resulting rate increases for program packages).

== Programming ==
American television has had very successful programs that have inspired television networks across the world to develop shows of similar types. Some of these shows are still on the air and some have maintained decent runs in syndication. Conversely, many programs produced for U.S. television are also routinely syndicated to broadcasters in other countries, and a number of popular American programs have been based on shows that originated in other countries, especially the Netherlands, the United Kingdom and Canada.

=== News ===
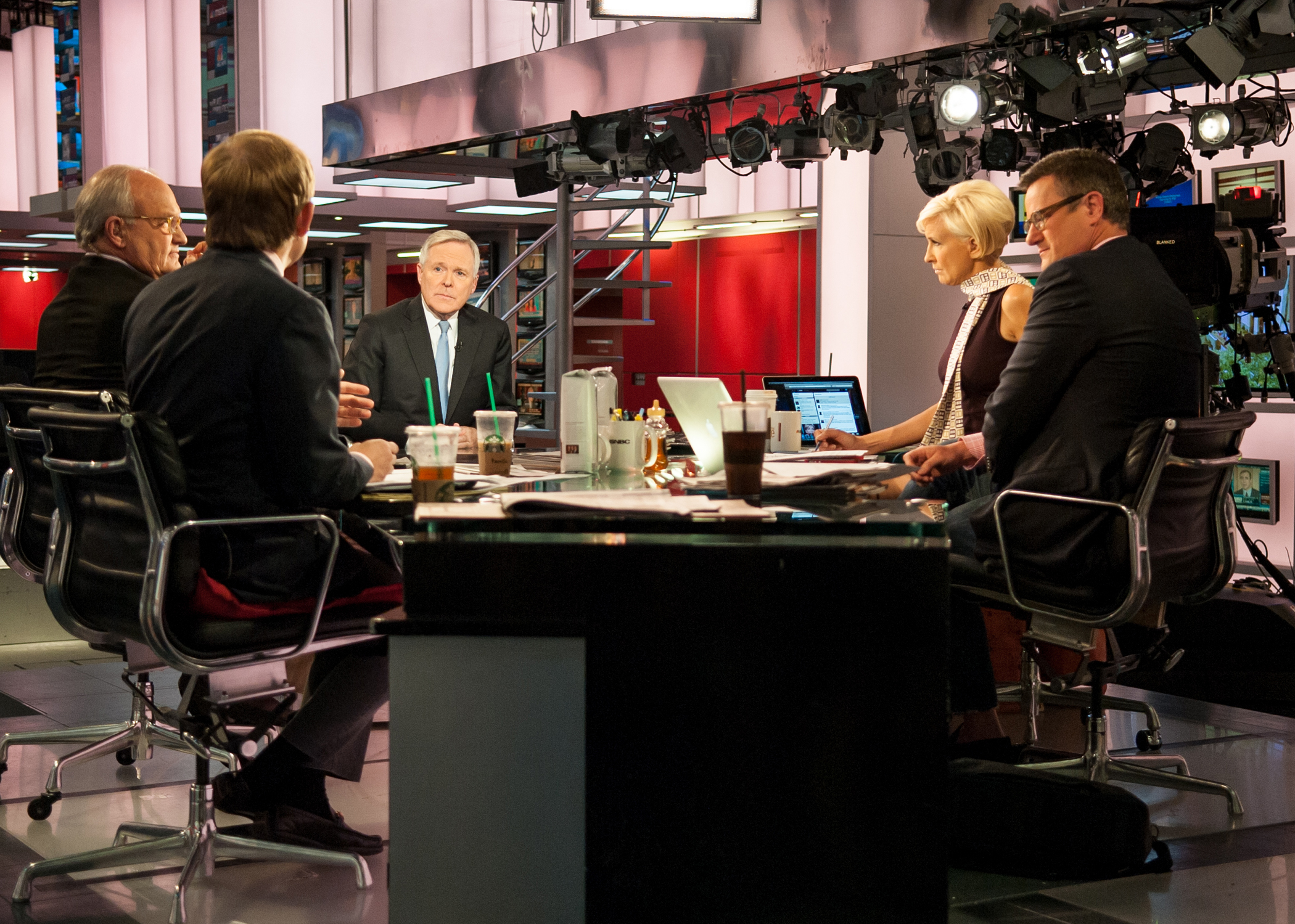
Morning Joe broadcasts from 30 Rockefeller Center in New York City.

The major networks (besides Fox) all offer a morning news program, with CBS's CBS Mornings, NBC's Today and ABC's Good Morning America as standard bearers, as well as an early-evening newscast anchored by the de facto face of the network's news division like Walter Cronkite and Dan Rather for CBS; Chet Huntley, David Brinkley and Tom Brokaw for NBC; and Peter Jennings for ABC. Successful news magazines have included 60 Minutes, 20/20 and Dateline NBC in prime time, and Meet the Press, Face the Nation and This Week on Sunday mornings.

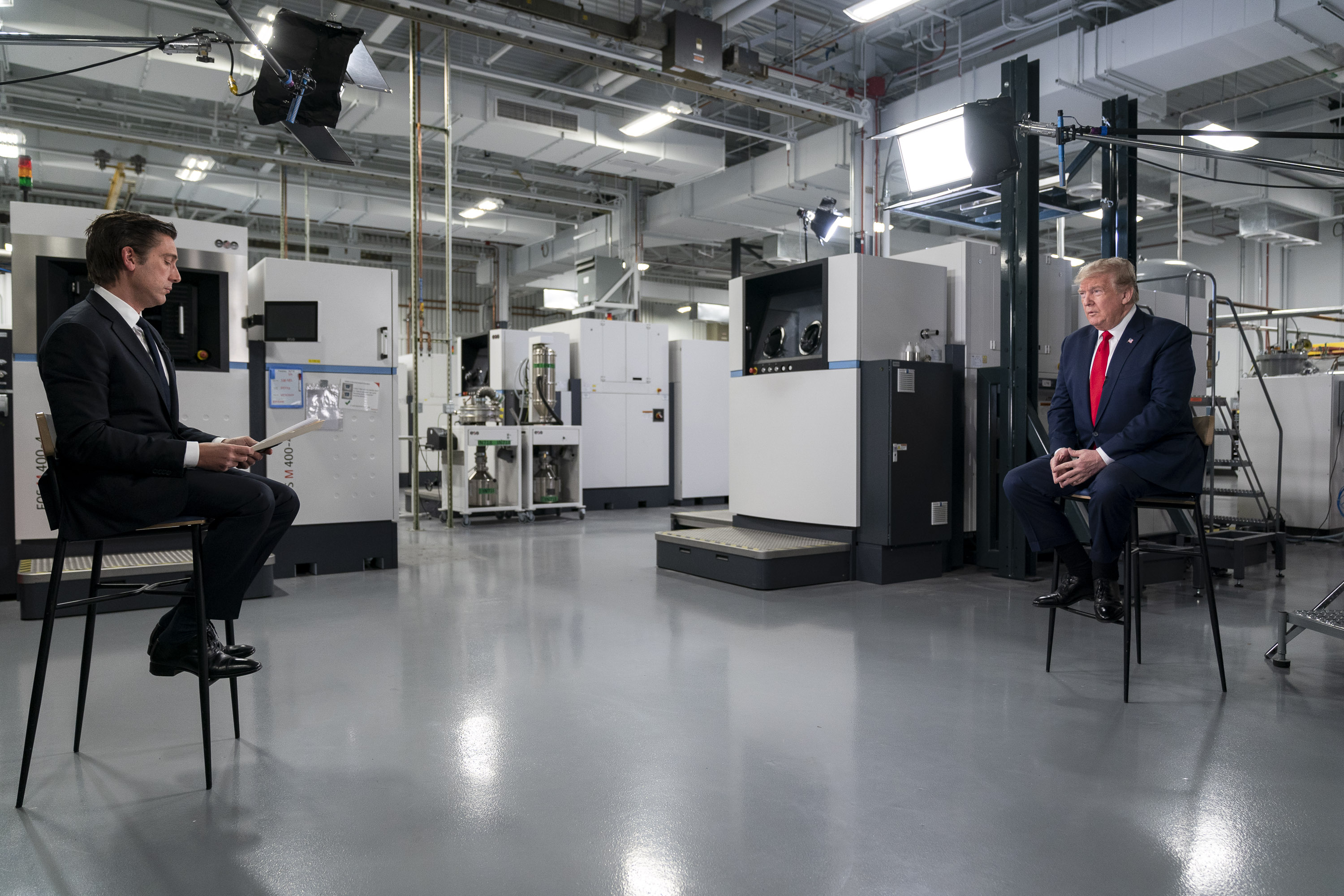
David Muir interviewing President Donald Trump on 20/20

Local news programming airs on many television stations, with individual markets supporting as few as two or as many as eight television news operations, depending on the number of available viewers that live in the market. Most stations originally aired locally produced newscasts only in evening time periods (usually at 6:00 and 10:00 or 11:00 p.m. local time) until the 1970s or as late as the mid-1980s on some stations. During that period, stations began local news programs in the midday and 5:00 p.m. time slots, while morning newscasts began to become common during the 1980s (first on weekdays, with weekend morning newscasts launching in many cities beginning in the early 1990s).

Two television stations in Philadelphia, Pennsylvania, KYW-TV and WPVI-TV, were the respective progenitors of two popular news formats that shaped the modern presentation of television news, Eyewitness News, which had reporters present their stories instead of having the anchor read them, and became popularized after the format expanded to WABC-TV in New York City in 1968, and Action News, which placed set time limits on story packages presented during the program, to cover a broader array of stories. WPVI was itself heavily influenced by the sensationalist approach of WKBW-TV in Buffalo, New York under Irv Weinstein, after the two stations' parent companies merged in 1972. WSVN in Miami also served as a pioneer in 1989, when the station joined Fox as part of a complicated six-station affiliation swap in two South Florida markets. Originating a news-intensive format with a heavy emphasis on tabloid journalism, crime stories, sensationalistic headlines and empathetic, emotional anchors, WSVN was regarded by a Frank Magid consultant as an update to Action News and Eyewitness News, and was soon copied or emulated by other stations throughout the country.

Cable news channels traditionally carry blocks of more generalized news coverage during the morning and afternoon hours; programs focusing on politics (that are similar in format to the Sunday morning talk shows) and documentaries typically air on these channels during prime time and late night, with general news coverage during that time usually limited to occasional coverage of breaking news events.

News programs make up a considerable amount of daily cable television viewership. Fox News, CNN, and MSNBC collectively average around 4 million viewers during prime time daily. Some of the most watched TV broadcasts in history were the moon landing (125 million), Nixon's resignation speech (110 million), and the O.J. Simpson police chase (95 million). However, viewership has been declining over the recent years with the advent of alternate news sources such as social media.

=== Game shows ===
The game show has been one of the longest-running formats in American television history; game shows have aired regularly since the CBS Television Quiz began regular broadcasts in 1941.

Game shows have typically followed one of several formats, some of which overlap. Quiz shows tend to be more serious in demeanor and are based on trivia, with their appeal drawn from the intelligence of the contestant and the often high prize payouts; they often air in prime time or fringe time were a major fad in the 1950s before a wide-ranging scandal exposed most of the quiz shows of the era (such as Twenty One, The $64,000 Question, Dotto and The Big Surprise) as either rigged or outright fabricated and triggered major reforms. The fallout from the scandal led to stricter limits on game show prizes that lasted for the rest of the 20th century. High-stakes quiz shows made a comeback in the late 1990s, particularly with the American adaptation of Who Wants to Be a Millionaire? and an uptick in interest in the long-running answer-and-question quiz Jeopardy! under host Alex Trebek.

Panel games featured a panel of celebrities or news personalities interacting with a contestant. Mark Goodson and Bill Todman were particularly well known for their panel games, which ranged from more erudite interview programs such as What's My Line? and To Tell the Truth to comedy-driven shows such as the Match Game. Audience participation games, while having had a place in American television since the beginning with early examples including Truth or Consequences and Dennis James's Okay, Mother, gained popularity in the late 1960s and 1970s with Let's Make a Deal (hosted and co-produced by Canadian Monty Hall) and the 1972 revival of The Price Is Right hosted by Bob Barker and (for its first five years in syndication) Dennis James; they changed the nature of game shows in that their atmosphere was more raucous than most panel games and quiz shows. Word guessing games are a format particularly associated with Bob Stewart, whose games involved celebrities giving clues to civilians (or vice versa) to guess a mystery word; examples included Password and Pyramid. Survey games, in which contestants attempt to guess the results of polls, can be seen in the form of shows such as Family Feud, America Says, Card Sharks (which also incorporates a card game element) and Power of 10. Puzzle games involve large-sized versions of common childhood games, including hangman (Wheel of Fortune), tic-tac-toe (Hollywood Squares, Tic-Tac-Dough), crossword puzzles (The Cross-Wits, Merv Griffin's Crosswords, People Puzzler), and video games (Starcade, Nick Arcade); Heatter-Quigley Productions produced a large number of puzzle games. Games that involve physical stunts include children's shows such as Double Dare and adult shows such as Dog Eat Dog and Fear Factor. A few game shows do not fit neatly into any of these descriptions; one such example is Supermarket Sweep, a grocery-shopping contest that became a cult hit on cable television in the 1990s under host David Ruprecht.

Loosely fitting the description are dating shows. Chuck Barris was famous for the format; his The Dating Game, The Newlywed Game and (notorious) 3's a Crowd pioneered the format, with other entries including Bzzz!, Blind Date, Singled Out, Love Connection and Baggage.

Game shows have historically been associated with daytime television in the United States. Quiz shows have typically aired in prime time, but ABC increased its output of non-quiz games in prime time beginning in the mid-2010s with its "Fun & Games" format, to substantial success.

=== Soap operas ===
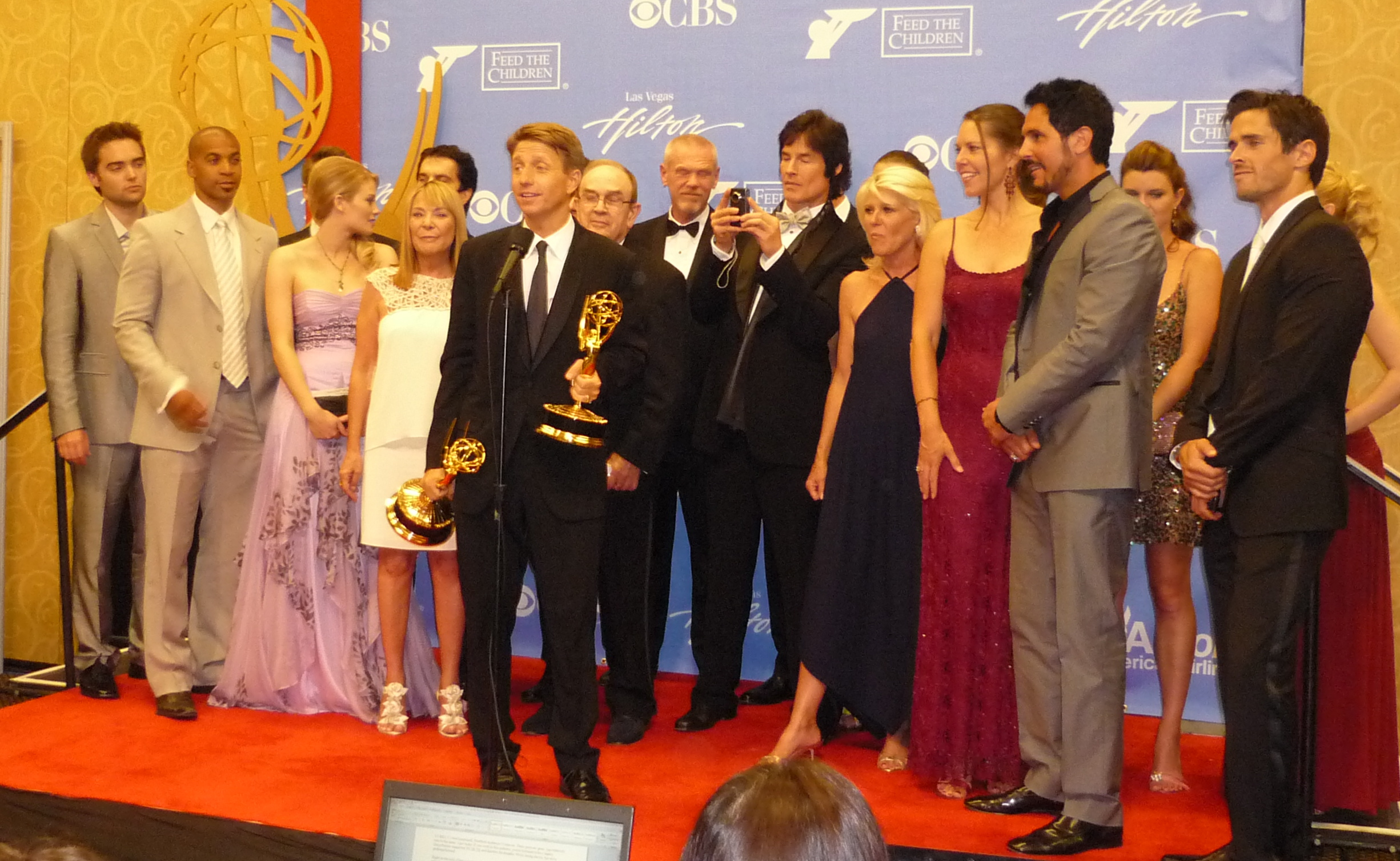
The cast and crew of The Bold and the Beautiful at the 2010 Daytime Emmy Awards

The soap opera genre experienced a gradual decline beginning in the 1980s due to the continued migration of women into the workplace, culminating in five soaps being canceled by NBC, CBS and ABC between 2007 and 2011 (of those, one, Passions, moved to DirecTV-owned network The 101 for one additional season after its cancellation by NBC in 2007, while All My Children and One Life to Live were revived on Hulu for one additional season in 2013 with those series' second cancellations resulting from a dispute between originating broadcaster ABC and the production company that acquired them, Prospect Park, over various issues).

Soap operas have also become common in prime time, which differ from their daytime counterparts as they use the traditional weekly format and maintain a visual style traditional of other nighttime network series (particularly, nighttime soaps are recorded on film in a single-camera setup, whereas daytime soaps are shot on multiple cameras that record the program on videotape). Prime time soaps of note have included Peyton Place, Dallas, Dynasty, Knots Landing, Falcon Crest, Beverly Hills, 90210, Melrose Place, Revenge and Scandal.

=== Comedies and dramas ===
Comedy programming on American television has been more noted for situation comedies such as I Love Lucy, The Honeymooners, The Andy Griffith Show, The Dick Van Dyke Show, The Mary Tyler Moore Show, All in the Family, Happy Days, Family Ties, Cheers, The Cosby Show, Seinfeld, Friends, Frasier, Everybody Loves Raymond, The King of Queens, How I Met Your Mother, The Big Bang Theory and Modern Family. However, there have also existed sketch comedy/variety series during prime time such as Texaco Star Theatre, The Carol Burnett Show and Rowan and Martin's Laugh-In. The most prominent as well as the longest-running sketch comedy program is Saturday Night Live, a late-night series which debuted on NBC in November 1975, and has spawned the careers of many popular comedic actors (such as Chevy Chase, Eddie Murphy, Dennis Miller and Will Ferrell).

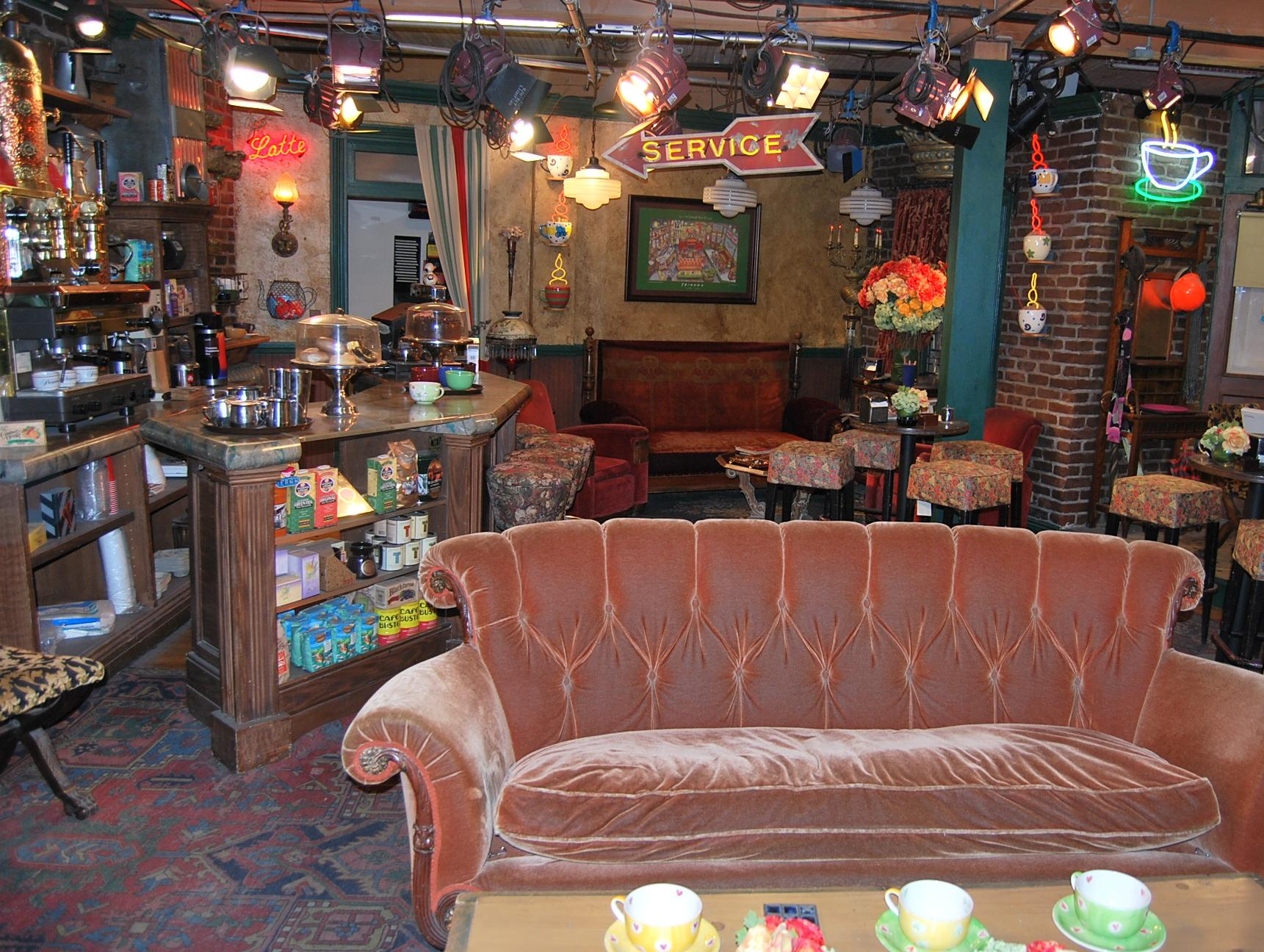
Friends set of Central Perk at Warner Bros. Studios

In the last 30 years, comedic adult animation has grown significantly. Popular shows such as The Simpsons, Beavis and Butt-Head, Family Guy, South Park, Futurama, American Dad, Rick and Morty, Bob's Burgers, Robot Chicken, King of the Hill, Daria, Aqua Teen Hunger Force, Duncanville, and more have came out during this time period. Others, like Bless the Harts and Clone High have more tame themes but still are not meant for children. Most adult animated cartoons air on Adult Swim, Comedy Central, FOX, TBS, MTV, The WB, NBC, Spike TV, and FXX.

Dramatic series have taken many forms over the years. Westerns such as Gunsmoke (the longest-running prime time scripted drama series in U.S. television history, having aired from 1955 to 1975) and Bonanza had experienced their greatest popularity in the 1950s and 1960s. Medical dramas such as Marcus Welby, M.D., St. Elsewhere, ER, House and Grey's Anatomy have endured success; as well as family dramas such as The Waltons, Little House on the Prairie and 7th Heaven; and crime dramas such as Dragnet, Hawaii Five-O, Hill Street Blues, Miami Vice, L.A. Law, 21 Jump Street, Law & Order, JAG, CSI: Crime Scene Investigation and NCIS.

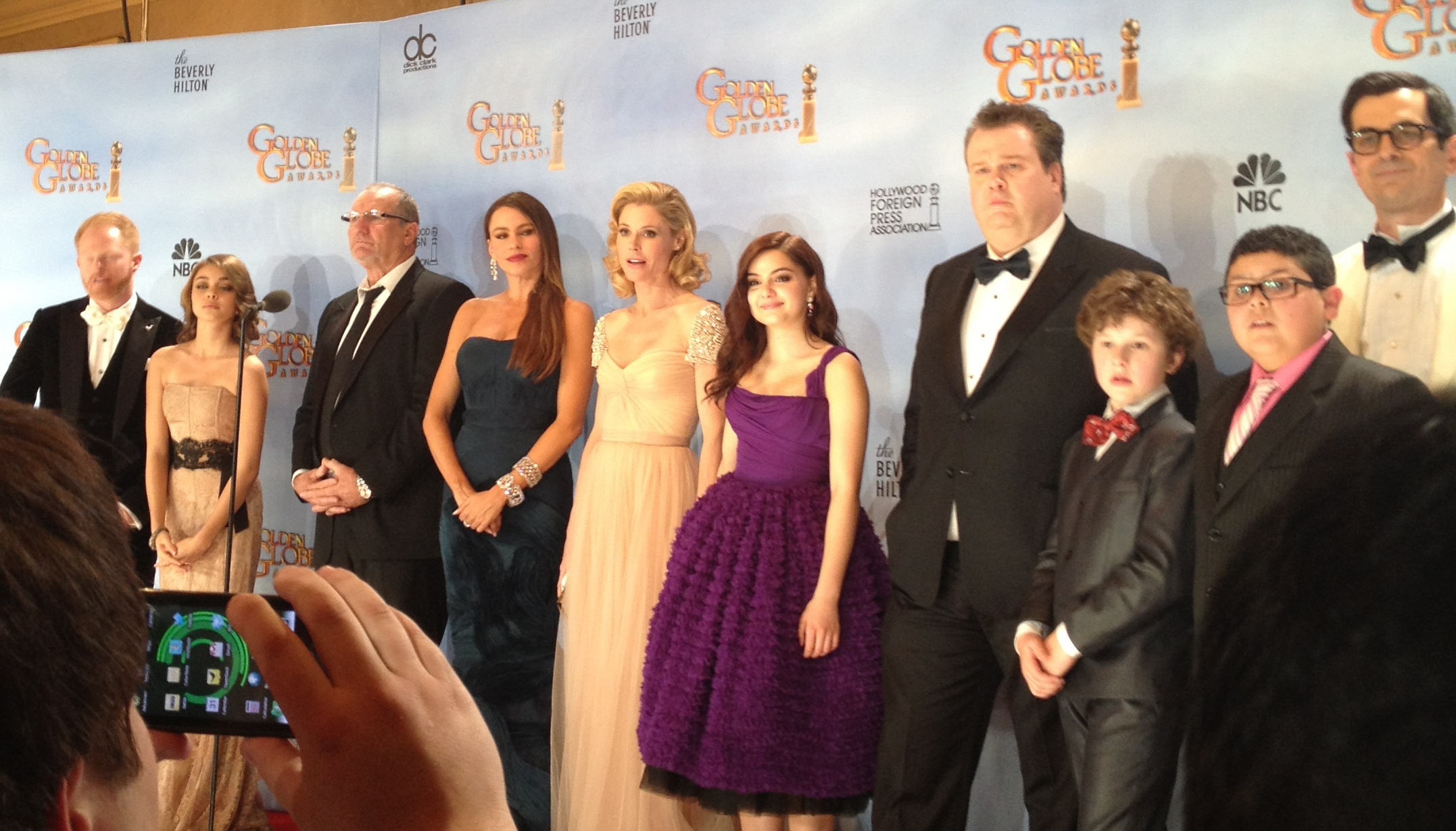
Cast of Modern Family at the 69th Golden Globe Awards in January 2012

Dramedy, a term for a television series that mixes elements of comedy and drama, have seen its popularity grown among viewers, thanks to programs like M*A*S*H, Ally McBeal, Ugly Betty, Desperate Housewives, Psych, Glee, Devious Maids, Jane the Virgin and Crazy Ex-Girlfriend.

Television series featuring fantasy and science fiction are also popular with American viewers, since these programs take elements of comedy, drama, adventure, or a combination of all of the above. Among the most notable fantasy series in this genre include Touched by an Angel and Highway to Heaven (both centering on angels helping humans in times of personal crisis), Bewitched (a sitcom centering on a witch adjusting to married life with a mortal male), Fantasy Island (which was set at a resort where people live out their fantasies, but at a price), The Twilight Zone (an anthology series known for its twist endings), Drop Dead Diva (focusing on a deceased model inhabiting the body of a lawyer) and Once Upon a Time (centering on fairytale characters that are trapped in the present day after the enactment of a curse). Science fiction series were originally more child-oriented, taking cues from film serials of the era (such as Flash Gordon and Captain Video and His Video Rangers). Star Trek pioneered adult-oriented science fiction during its three-year run in the late 1960s and spawned seven spin-off series–two in syndication (The Next Generation and Deep Space Nine), three on network television (The Animated Series, Voyager and Enterprise) and two exclusively streamed on the Internet (Discovery and Picard). The film franchise Star Wars has spawned a number of television productions over the course of its existence, ranging from the Star Wars Holiday Special to The Mandalorian.

=== Reality television ===
Reality television has long existed in the United States, both played for laughs (such as Candid Camera and Real People) and as drama (such as COPS and The Real World). A new variant – competition series placing ordinary people in unusual circumstances or in talent contests, generally eliminating at least one participant per week, exploded in popularity in turn of the millennium (with shows such as Survivor, Big Brother, The Amazing Race, American Idol, America's Next Top Model, Dancing with the Stars, The Bachelor and its spin-off The Bachelorette, So You Think You Can Dance and The Voice).

=== Talk shows ===
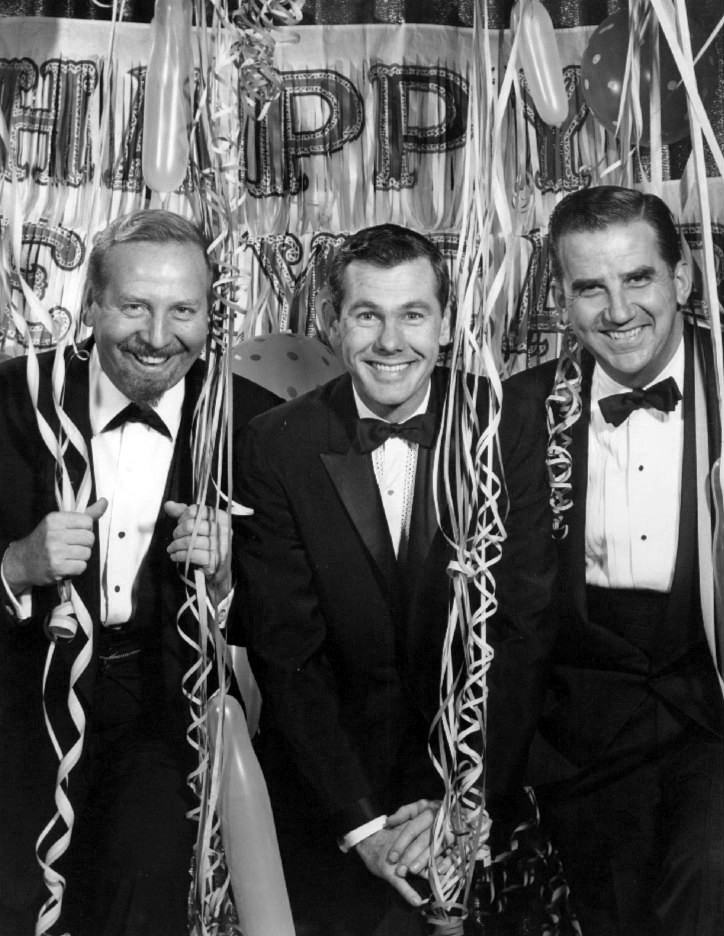
New Year's Eve 1962, with (L-R) Skitch Henderson, Johnny Carson and Ed McMahon

The most successful talk show has been The Tonight Show, particularly during the 30-year run of third host Johnny Carson. Tonight ushered in a multi-decade period of dominance by one network – NBC – in American late-night programming and paved the way for many similar programs combining comedy and celebrity interviews, such as The Merv Griffin Show and Late Night with David Letterman. Despite initial failed attempts during the late 1980s by Fox as well as the success of The Arsenio Hall Show in syndication during its first five-year run beginning in 1989, the late-night talk show genre would not become a more competitive field until the 1990s, when CBS gained a major foothold in the field with the Late Show with David Letterman; competition in the genre increased even further as cable networks entered into the genre in the 2000s and 2010s with the rise of parody news show The Daily Show under host Jon Stewart and newer shows such as The Colbert Report, Jimmy Kimmel Live!, and Conan.

Daytime talk show hits have included Live with Kelly and Ryan (and its previous iterations with Regis Philbin as co-host), The Jenny Jones Show, The Oprah Winfrey Show, Rachael Ray, Dr. Phil, Ricki Lake, The Ellen DeGeneres Show, and Harry which run the gamut from serious to lighthearted in topicality and format; a subset of so-called "trash TV" talk shows such as The Jerry Springer Show, which hit their peak during the 1990s, also veered into exploitation and titillation. Most daytime talk programs air in syndication, with various attempts airing on network television to mixed results among the more notable network efforts are the female-driven panel talk shows The View, The Talk, The Real and Get It Girl on LATV.

=== Children's programming ===
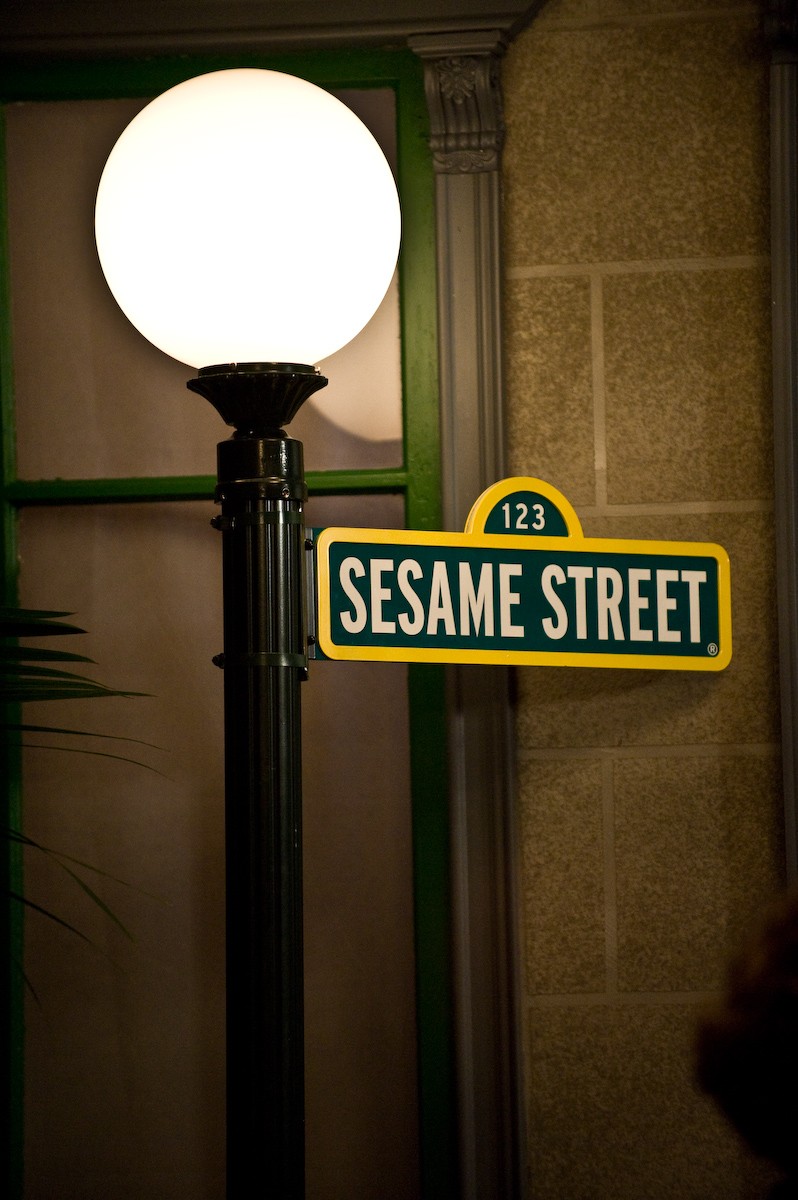
The Sesame Street signpost

Children's television programs are also quite popular. Early ventures into children's television in the 1950s aired on weekdays with shows such as Howdy Doody, Captain Kangaroo, Mr. Wizard, and the Mickey Mouse Club. However children's programing had experienced its greatest success on Saturday mornings from the late 1960s to the early 1990s. Programs shown during these time periods mainly consisted of animated programming including classic cartoons (such as Looney Tunes, Tom and Jerry and Woody Woodpecker), reruns of prime time animated sitcoms (such as The Flintstones and The Jetsons), foreign acquisitions (such as Astro Boy, Kimba the White Lion, and Speed Racer), animated adaptations of films and television series (such as Back to the Future, Ghostbusters, Batman, ALF and Star Trek), and original programs (such as The Rocky and Bullwinkle Show, Scooby-Doo, Fat Albert and the Cosby Kids, The Smurfs, Alvin and the Chipmunks, Garfield and Friends and Teenage Mutant Ninja Turtles).

Some locally produced children's programs – which often mixed cartoons, special guests and audience-participation games – also became popular in the local markets where they were broadcast; one of the most popular was the Bozo the Clown franchise, which became most well known for its Chicago version, which began airing nationally when WGN-TV became a superstation in October 1978.

However, in 1990, due to concerns regarding commercial advertising and cross-promotion in children's programs by parental advocacy groups, the Federal Communications Commission passed the Children's Television Act, legislation that among other provisions requires all broadcast television networks and stations to air at least three hours of educational children's programming each week. This has made it much harder for broadcast stations to profit from children's programs than was possible in previous years, eventually leading the major broadcast networks to abandon traditional scripted programs in favor of unscripted educational series with formats appealing to a more generalized audience to fulfill the requirements; noncommercial networks are exceptions to this new standard, as PBS Kids in particular has long excelled in providing E/I-compliant children's programs that mix educational and entertainment content (such as Sesame Street, Mister Rogers' Neighborhood, Thomas the Tank Engine & Friends and Arthur).

Since the mid-2000s, popular children's programs have been produced for cable networks such as Nickelodeon, Disney Channel and Cartoon Network that are targeted at the demographic and only provide educational content voluntarily – in which case, it is primarily aimed at preschool-aged children and relegated to morning hours, unless incorporated full-time as part of the channel's format, as is the case with the spin-offs of the former two aforementioned networks Nick Jr. Channel and Disney Junior – as they are not bound by the Children's Television Act's guidelines. Nickelodeon and Cartoon Network also have blocks that air late at night (Adult Swim, Nick at Nite), that mainly show sitcoms, original and syndicated animation, and Japanese anime which have adult themes such as gore, sexual situations, and profanity.

=== Instructional television ===
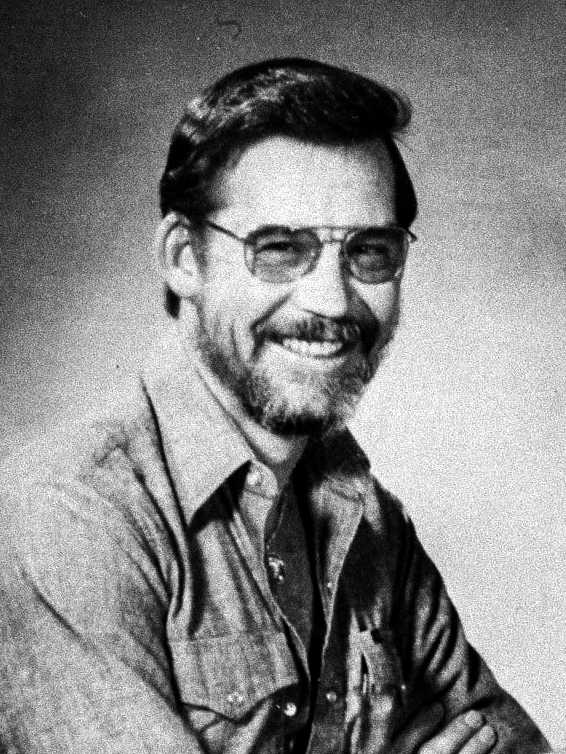
Bob Ross, host of the painting instruction program The Joy of Painting, in 1982.

Adult instructional television, other than a few niche programs (such as the agriculture-themed Ag PhD), has typically been the province of noncommercial television. The Joy of Painting, which during the lifetime of host Bob Ross was seen on public television, exploded in popularity several years after Ross died as younger viewers came to appreciate Ross's kind and quiet style of teaching oil painting, prompting his estate to reintroduce the show by way of various online media. The home improvement series This Old House is unusual among American television series in that it is available to both commercial and noncommercial broadcasters. In the form of expository bible readings, instructional television is a staple of religious broadcasting. A common form of instructional television, both noncommercially (such as The French Chef with Julia Child or Martin Yan's Yan Can Cook) and commercially (such as Mr. Food and Paula Deen), is the cooking show, in which the host demonstrates various recipes that home viewers can prepare themselves.

=== Professional wrestling ===
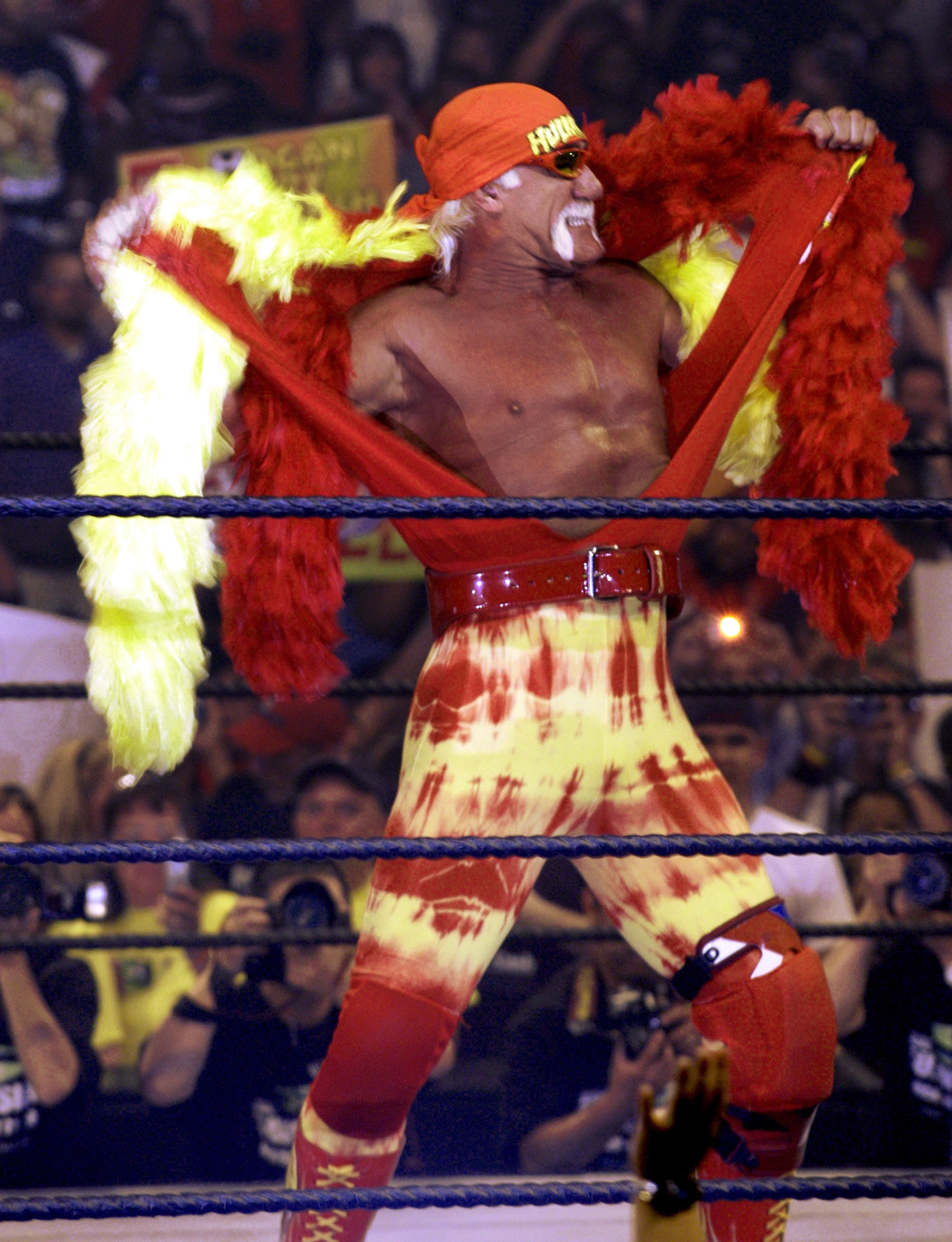
Hulk Hogan was the face of the WWF during the 1980s, and it is for this reason that the decade is also known as the Hulkamania era.

Professional wrestling had been aired on local television during its earliest days and began to be aired in national television during the 1950s. It underwent a resurgence in the 1980s as Vince McMahon's World Wrestling Federation and Ted Turner's World Championship Wrestling (WCW) each built rivalling national wrestling empires. During the Monday Night War of the 1990s, WWF and WCW maintained a heated televised rivalry. The boom eventually collapsed by the turn of the millennium, and McMahon purchased WCW in 2001 and an upstart hardcore promotion, Paul Heyman's Extreme Championship Wrestling (ECW), and merged them into WWF to form the modern WWE. WWE maintains a dominant presence in professional wrestling; its largest rival as of 2020 is All Elite Wrestling. Other would-be rivals Total Nonstop Action Wrestling and Ring of Honor (ROH) also have a presence on American television (the latter primarily as a result of its 2011 acquisition by television station owner Sinclair Broadcast Group; ROH suspended operations and was sold to AEW in 2022).

Regional professional wrestling circuits may see some national exposure through syndication; Championship Wrestling from Hollywood and Ohio Valley Wrestling have national carriage. Foreign wrestling promotions such as Lucha Underground and New Japan Pro-Wrestling have seen increased exposure in the 2010s.

=== Sports ===
The broadcasting of sports events is a major component of the American commercial television industry. Sports tend to draw a large, wealthy audience that can command large sums of revenue from advertising and subscription fees.

In the early days of television, sports quickly became a fixture of American broadcast television. Boxing was carried on almost every television station and network since the beginnings. The sport earned a negative reputation after Emile Griffith killed his opponent on national television in a 1962 contest, followed by the death of Davey Moore from an indirect in-ring injury during another televised contest a year later; by 1964, boxing was off national television. The rise of pay-per-view and premium channels led to most of the highest-profile matches returning to the airwaves via subscription television. While it still maintains a limited (and rising, thanks to the efforts of Premier Boxing Champions) presence on American broadcast television, boxing has declined in popularity since the 1990s with mixed martial arts, a more broad-based combat sport, rising to take its place.

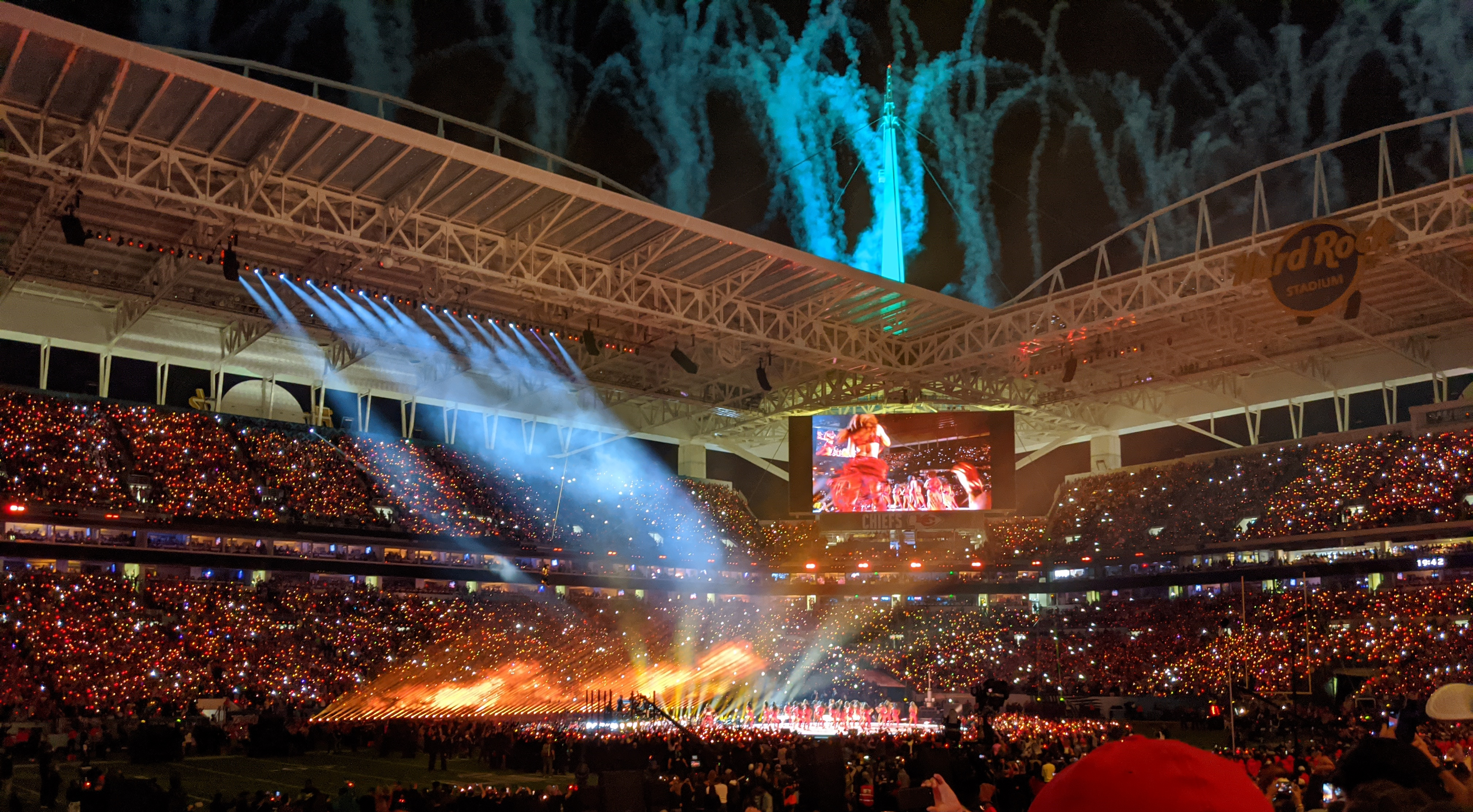
Stage pictured from the audience. Shakira during "Whenever, Wherever" on the screen at the Super Bowl halftime show

The major professional sports leagues began regular television broadcasts in the 1950s. The National Football League (NFL)'s embrace of television broadcasting at the early onset of the medium helped boost its popularity as a sport, and by the 1960s, the combined success of NFL and American Football League (AFL) telecasts helped earn professional football a status as a mainstay of the major television networks. American television pays the NFL billions of dollars each year to maintain their television rights; the Super Bowl, in return, is a cash windfall for the network which airs it as the broadcaster which holds the rights in a given year (which is rotated annually among the broadcast networks that hold rights to the league's regular season and playoff games) can make hundreds of millions of dollars in revenue from advertising sales alone. Major League Baseball (MLB) has been televised on U.S. television since the inception of the medium, most notably by way of a "Game of the Week" that has usually aired on Saturdays on various broadcasters since 1954.

The National Hockey League (NHL), in contrast, was much slower to embrace television, due to its initially regional nature and greater reliance on Canadian television, though it would begin broadcasting its events nationally on a wider basis after Fox acquired the rights to the league's game broadcasts in 1995; the NHL has struggled to gain competitive ratings for most of its time on television.

College sports have also been a feature of American television. The National Collegiate Athletic Association (NCAA) restricted television broadcasts of college football, as well as college basketball, from the early 1950s until 1984. In the latter year, the Supreme Court struck down the NCAA's collective television contract as a violation of antitrust law, deregulating the sale of college sports telecasts and allowing individual teams and athletic conferences to negotiate their own deals with broadcast and cable networks.

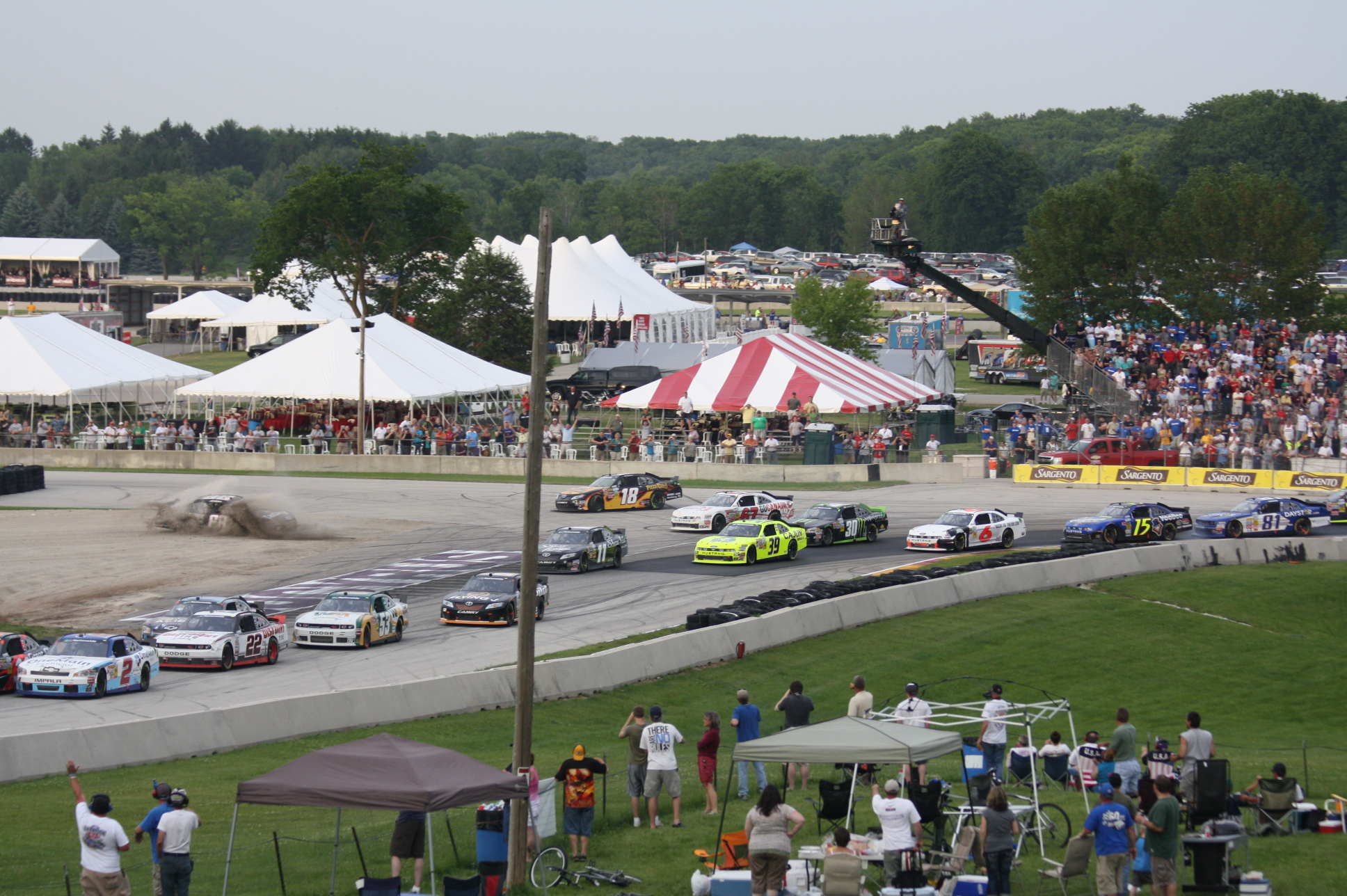
The Nationwide (now Xfinity) Series at Road America in 2011, using the Car of Tomorrow design

Other sports that have maintained a regular presence on U.S. television include auto racing (NASCAR, in particular, rose rapidly in television popularity in the 1990s; the IndyCar series has also had some presence, particularly its signature event, the Indianapolis 500), professional golf (prominently through the Professional Golfers Association of America [PGA], Ladies Professional Golf Association [LPGA], and the United States Golf Association [USGA]), thoroughbred racing (particularly, the Triple Crown and Breeders Cup) and ten-pin bowling. Televised poker, while not an athletic sport, has been treated as a sport of sorts, with a boom in poker broadcasting between 2003 and 2011, after which federal pressure cut off most of the broadcasts' sponsors. Other sports have been televised through anthology series such as ABC's Wide World of Sports (that same network would launch a documentary-based anthology, ESPN Sports Saturday, in 2011, and the more eccentrically formatted ESPN8 The Ocho in 2017), CBS Sports Spectacular and NBC SportsWorld, sometimes through time-buy arrangements with event organizers.

Sports broadcasts are carried through a number of televised media. Most of the major sports have some presence on commercial broadcast television, including all NFL regular season and most playoff games. National cable networks, beginning with ESPN in 1979 (along with its later sister channels that gradually launched beginning in the 1990s) and later joined by competitors such as NBCSN and Fox Sports 1, carry packages of assorted major professional and college sports. The vast majority of MLB, NHL and National Basketball Association (NBA) games are carried through regional sports networks, however the NFL only permits preseason games to air on RSNs on a limited basis (the league otherwise prohibits regular season and playoff games from airing on regional sports networks, but does permit national cable networks to acquire the rights to air them); the leagues (as well as the NFL) restrict the broadcast of their sports on regional networks to specific territories and require any person outside those territories to purchase an out-of-market sports package to watch the majority of their favored team's games. Regional sports networks can also provide outlets for minor league sports to broadcast their events. Unlike in some other countries, public television does not own any sports rights, nor has it ever been a major factor in sports television.

=== Imported programming ===
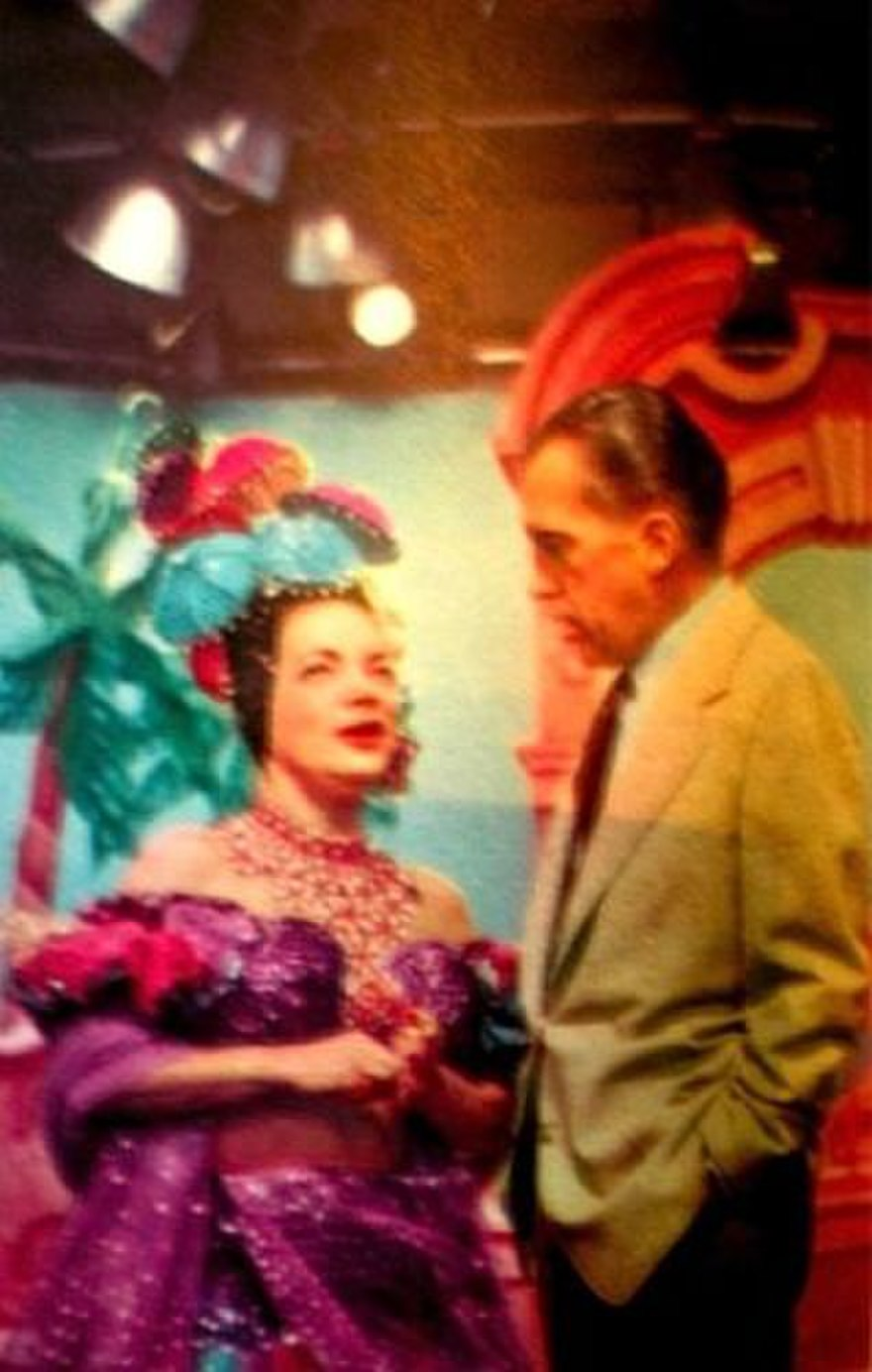
Carmen Miranda and Ed Sullivan on Toast of the Town, 1953

While the majority of programs broadcast on American television are produced domestically, some programs carried in syndication, on public television or on cable are imported from other countries – most commonly, from the primarily English-speaking countries of Canada and the United Kingdom. PBS in particular, is commonly known for its broadcasts of British sitcoms (such as Monty Python's Flying Circus, Fawlty Towers, Keeping Up Appearances and Are You Being Served?), which typically air on its member stations on weekend evenings (although their scheduling is at the discretion of the station as these programs are primarily syndicated on behalf of outside distributors); PBS was also responsible for bringing the hit period drama Downton Abbey to the U.S. and for initially popularizing the long-running science-fiction series Doctor Who in the country (the latter show now airs first-run episodes on BBC America, an outlet launched in 1998 that was specifically designed to bring BBC programming direct to the United States, although through channel drift it now mainly carries American programming; Doctor Who continues to be syndicated to public television stations and, in reruns, is also syndicated to commercial digital multicast networks such as the Retro Television Network).

The minimal differences between General American English and Standard Canadian English accents allow Canada to export shows to the United States, and vice versa, without a major culture barrier. Many of the programs imported from Canada are children's programs originally aired by channels such as YTV and Family Channel (such as Are You Afraid of the Dark?, You Can't Do That on Television, Naturally, Sadie and Life with Derek). However, other Canadian series aimed at adults or more general audiences have also been syndicated in the United States; one network, Ion Life (a spin-off of Ion Television), has much of its schedule composed of reruns of since-discontinued Canadian lifestyle series. Among some of the more well-known Canadian television series among American viewers include the Degrassi High franchise (which aired in Canada on CBC Television, with the later incarnation Degrassi: The Next Generation airing on CTV and presently MuchMusic), Rookie Blue, SCTV Network and The Red Green Show. Australian television shows have occasionally appeared on American television, but these have historically been limited to children's series (such as Bananas in Pajamas and The Wiggles) and teen dramas (such as Ship to Shore and H_{2}O: Just Add Water).

Programming from Japan has had a niche market in American television, with some anime programs (generally dubbed into English) having been seen on American television since the 1960s. Channels that air such anime include Adult Swim, Disney XD, Nicktoons, TOKU, Neon Alley, the Anime Network, Animax, and Aniplus. The Power Rangers series was heavily edited from a Japanese live-action tokusatsu series, Super Sentai, with newly filmed bridging sequences involving American actors (as the action sequences were entirely done in full costume, those scenes only had to be dubbed). The success of Power Rangers led to a wave of tokusatsu adaptations in the mid-1990s, none of which survived beyond two years. More recently Japanese live-action series started to be shown in the country by Netflix, examples include Atelier, Hibana: Spark, Samurai Gourmet and Alice in Borderland.

European television series also started to be shown in the country, mainly after the rise of streaming services, with Netflix being the main exhibitor of such programs in the United States. Examples include the Norwegian series Occupied, Ragnarok and Nobel; the Icelander series The Valhalla Murders; the Danish series Rita and The Rain; Italian series Suburra: Blood on Rome; the German series Babylon Berlin, Dark and Unorthodox; the French series Call My Agent!, Osmosis, La Mante, A Very Secret Service; the Spanish series Money Heist, Cable Girls and Elite. The South Korean thriller series Squid Game became an unexpected hit in the United States in 2021 through its appearance on Netflix. France has also contributed a number of computer-animated series to American television in the 21st century, among them Rabbids Invasion, The Garfield Show and Grizzy & the Lemmings.

American Spanish-language networks also import much of their programming; for example, Univision imports much of its programming, especially telenovelas that are broadcast on the network, from Mexican broadcaster Televisa, and MundoMax distributes programming from Colombian broadcaster and network owner RCN Television. In addition to being shown on free-to-air television, Latin American TV series are also shown through streaming services. Examples include the Argentine series El Marginal, the Mexican series La Casa de las Flores and the Brazilian series 3%.

=== The life cycle of American television shows ===
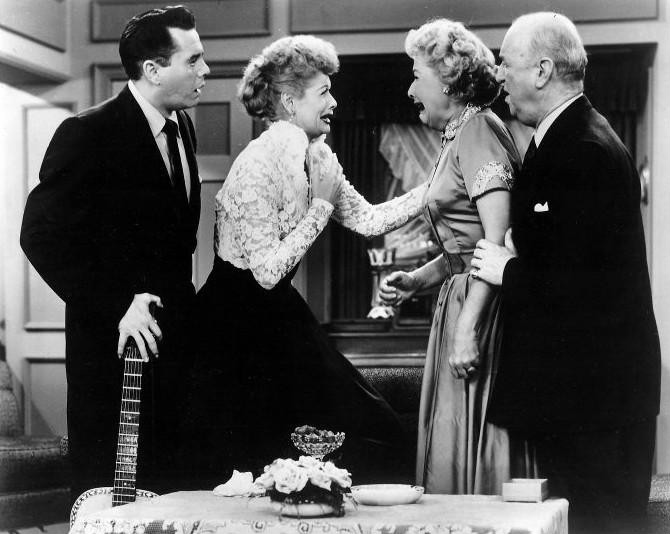
The cast of I Love Lucy (L-R): Desi Arnaz, Lucille Ball, Vivian Vance, and William Frawley. I Love Lucy has spent over 60 years in reruns after it ended in 1957.

Television production companies either commission teleplays for television pilots or buy spec scripts. Some of these scripts are turned into pilots for proposed television programs. The production company markets those they consider commercially viable to television networks – or television distributors for first-run syndication (for example, CBS Media Ventures distributes Dr. Phil in first-run syndication, because that show is syndicated – it is not carried on a particular network). A few things that a television network takes under consideration in deciding to order a show is if the show itself is compatible with the network's target audience, the cost of production, and if the show is well liked among network executives, and in many cases, test audiences.

Networks sometimes preemptively purchase pilots to prevent other networks from controlling them – and the purchase of a pilot is no guarantee that the network will order additional episodes. In other cases, the network may be forced to commission the pilot to avoid shouldering monetary penalties if it is not produced. The producers hire a director and other crew members (in some cases, using staff employed with an existing series) to work on the pilot; in some cases, if the pilot's concept was pitched by producers that would not write for the proposed show before a script is drafted, writers may also be assigned to pen the script and would be given credit as the series' creator(s). Pilots that do get "picked up" get either a full or partial-season order (starting with an initial order of between seven and 13 episodes, which may be extended if the program's viewership is strong during the early run of episodes); the show goes into production, usually establishing itself with permanent sets. Writers, additional directors and some full-time crew members are hired, and work begins – usually during the late spring and summer before the fall season-series premieres (shows can also serve as a midseason replacement, meaning they are ordered specifically to fill holes in a network schedule created by the failure and cancellation of shows that premiered in the fall; Buffy the Vampire Slayer and The Office are examples of successful midseason replacements). Unscripted series have a different stage of development, as the program is generally pitched only as a concept, often without a pilot being ordered or already produced.

The standard broadcast television season in the United States consists of 22 episodes (which are typically broadcast over a period of nine months from September to May, depending on the date on which the program begins its season), although prior to the 1970s, a single season of a weekly television program consisted of as many as 40 episodes, with few breaks in the show's airing schedule. Sitcoms may have 24 or more; animated programs may have more (or fewer) episodes (some are broken up into two 11-minute shorts, often with separate self-contained storylines, that are folded into a single half-hour episode); cable networks with original programming seem to have settled on about 10 to 13 episodes per season, much in line with British television programming, though there are exceptions (particularly with cable networks specializing in children's programming, which use the network television model of total per-season episode counts, but spread out the episodes over a single calendar year).

American soap operas air in the afternoon, five days a week, without any significant break in taping and airing schedules throughout the year. This means that these serials air approximately 260 episodes a year, making their cast and crew members the busiest in show business. These shows are rarely, if ever, repeated (unless the network chooses not to air a new episode on certain major holidays), making it difficult for viewers to "catch up" when they miss an episode, though the television networks' adoption of online streaming during the late 2000s has made it easier for viewers to watch recent episodes of a particular soap. Cable channel SoapNet provided weekly repeats for some broadcasts until it shut down in December 2013, after which TVGN (now Pop, and originally a television listings service formerly known under several names including the Prevue Channel) began airing same-day repeats of some network soaps.

Networks use profits from commercials that run during the show to pay the production company, which in turn pays the cast and crew, and keeps a share of the profits for itself (networks sometimes act as both production companies and distributors, though due to the vertical integration of networks and major media companies since the 1990s, production arms operated by the broadcast networks have largely been absorbed into the existing production arms of their corporate parents). As advertising rates are based on the size of the audience, measuring the number of people watching a network is very important. This measurement is known as a show or network's ratings. Sweeps months (which occur in November, February, May, and to a lesser extent July) are important landmarks in the television season – ratings earned during these periods determine advertising rates until the next sweeps period, therefore shows often have their most exciting plot developments happen during sweeps.

Shows that are successful with audiences and advertisers receive authorization from the network to continue production, until the plotline ends (only for scripted shows) or if the contract expires. Those that are not successful are often quickly told to discontinue production by the network, known as "cancellation". There are instances of initially low-rated shows surviving cancellation and later becoming highly popular, but these are rare. For the most part, shows that are not immediately or even moderately successful are cancelled by the end of November sweeps, if not shortly thereafter or earlier. Usually if a show is canceled, there is little chance of it ever coming back again especially on the same network it was canceled from; the only show in the U.S. to ever come back from cancellation on the same network is Family Guy (which was cancelled by Fox in 2002 and was revived by the network in 2005 due to the increased popularity of the series through reruns on cable and DVD releases). However, canceled shows like Scrubs, Southland, Medium and Wonder Woman have been picked up by other networks, which is becoming an increasingly common practice; similarly, in the 2010s, some programs cancelled by traditional television networks like Arrested Development, Community and The Mindy Project have been picked up or revived by internet television streaming services. It is also somewhat common for series to continue production for the purpose of completing a DVD set, even if these episodes will never air on television (these episodes would, in years past, be "burned off" by airing them in less-prominent time slots).

Once a television series reaches a threshold of approximately 88 to 100 episodes, it becomes a candidate to enter reruns in off-network syndication. Reruns are a lucrative business for television producers, who can sell the rights to a "used" series without the expenses of producing it (though they may have to pay royalties to the affected parties, depending on union contracts). The sale of previously aired programs to other outlets, including the Internet, television stations outside the United States and traditional off-network syndication, constitutes up to half of an individual show's revenue stream as of 2017, with the other half coming from first-run advertising.

Sitcoms are traditionally the most widely syndicated reruns and are usually aired in a five-day-a-week strip (standardly with two episode "runs", separate sets of episodes of a particular program that are usually from different seasons, packaged for stations to air back-to-back or in different time slots), and in most cases, with additional weekend runs consisting of two (or in some cases, four) additional episodes. Marginally performing shows tend to last less than three to five years in broadcast syndication, sometimes moving to cable channels (although rerun packages of some series are sold simultaneously into both broadcast syndication and cable, and sometimes to more than one cable network) or into limited-run barter syndication (such as through The Program Exchange) after the end of their syndication runs, while more widely successful series can have a life in syndication that can run for decades (I Love Lucy, the first series designed to be rerun, remains popular in syndication more than 60 years after its 1951 debut).

Cable and digital broadcast networks have provided outlets for programming that either has outlived its syndication viability, lacks the number of episodes necessary for syndication, or for various reasons was not a candidate for syndication in the first place. Popular dramas, for instance, have permanent homes on several basic cable channels, often running in marathons (multiple episodes airing back-to-back for several hours), and there are also cable channels devoted to game shows (Game Show Network and Buzzr), soap operas (the now-defunct SoapNet), Saturday morning cartoons (Boomerang) and even sports broadcasts (ESPN Classic). Digital broadcast networks specializing in classic television programming that have become popular since the early 2010s have also served as short-term or long-term homes for many older series that have not been syndicated in decades or have ever been aired in reruns. Most reality shows perform poorly in reruns and are rarely seen as a result, other than reruns of series still in production, on the same network on which they air (almost always cable outlets), where they air as filler programming.

== Regulation ==
The Federal Communications Commission is the regulatory governing body for television in the United States.

Broadcast television is regulated by the Federal Communications Commission. The FCC awards and oversees the renewal of licenses to local stations, which stipulate stations' commitments to educational and public-interest programming. During the early years of commercial television, the FCC permitted a single company to own a maximum of five television stations nationwide (later raised to seven stations in 1984 and then to twelve in 1992), although until the 1960s, very few companies outside of the major broadcast networks owned multiple stations. Since a change to its media ownership regulations in 1999 that counted television station ownership maximums by a national market percentage rather than by the number of stations that could be allowed in their portfolio, FCC rules mandate that the total number of television stations owned by any company can only reach a maximum of 39% of all markets in the U.S. Until 2016, a "discount" allowed a broadcaster to cover up to 78% of the U.S. with UHF signals; this loophole was closed in 2016, although existing companies above the 39% threshold will be covered under a grandfather clause and, although they will not be allowed to acquire any more stations, they will also not be forced to sell their existing portfolios.

Most commercial stations are now owned-and-operated or controlled through outsourcing agreements by group owners (either independent companies or network-owned subsidiary groups), with a relatively limited number of companies that remain which own stations in five or fewer markets; a series of station purchases that have occurred since 2011 (when the Sinclair Broadcast Group acquired the Four Points Media Group) has concentrated the number of station owners even further, as a result of increasing competition between over-the-air broadcasters and subscription television outlets as well as to increase leverage in negotiations with cable and satellite providers for retransmission consent (which since the early 2000s, has increasingly become a primary form of revenue for broadcast networks, which have required their affiliates to share a portion of the revenue received by pay television providers as an additional source of operational revenue).

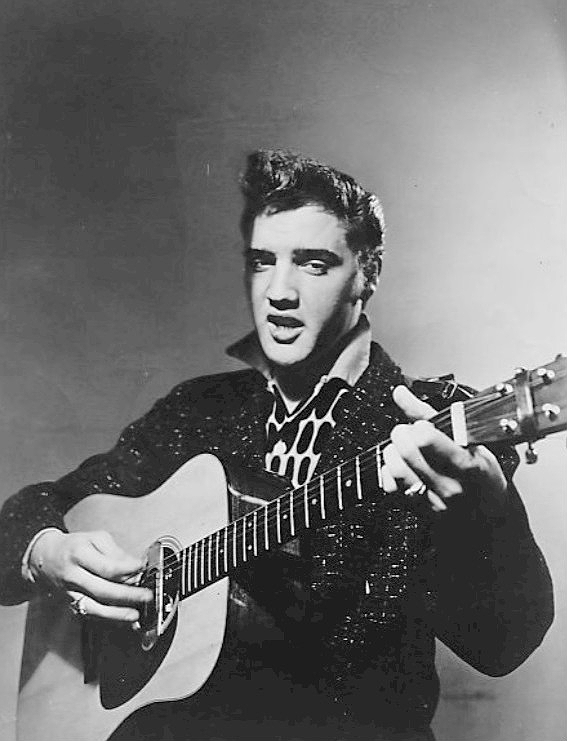
On January 6, 1957, one of the more famous, and by today's viewpoint bizarre, acts of "censorship" in television history. Elvis Presley was deliberately filmed from the waist up only.

Outsourcing agreements (known by multiple terms, mainly local marketing agreements [LMA], shared services agreements [SSA] or joint sales agreements [JSA], albeit with little differentiation in their structure) have allowed some broadcasting companies to operate stations that they could otherwise not legally own outright due to in-market ownership regulations; these arrangements first began in 1991, when the Sinclair Broadcast Group entered into such an arrangement to run WPTT (now WPNT) in Pittsburgh, after it sold the station to its manager Edwin Edwards to acquire Fox affiliate WPGH-TV. However, as companies like Sinclair and the Nexstar Media Group have used outsourcing as loopholes around ownership regulations at the expense of independent (and particularly, minority) ownership, the FCC has made attempts to restrict broadcasters from using them, passing a rule in April 2014 that disallowed all JSAs in which one company sells 15% of advertising for another station and required all existing ones to be unwound within five years (the National Association of Broadcasters backed a provision passed as part of a November 2015 Congressional budget bill that extended to the time limit to unwind existing JSAs to ten years).

The FCC also previously barred companies from owning more than one television station within a single market, unless it operated as a satellite station (a full-power station that relays programming from its parent station to areas within the market that are not adequately covered if at all by the main signal) or a low-power station (either one that maintains its own programming or operates as a translator); however, it eventually allowed operators of public television stations to sign-on or acquire a second station that did not repeat the parent's signal (some of which were originally licensed as commercial outlets). In August 1999, the FCC legalized the common ownership of two commercial stations, known as duopolies, if one of them is not among the market's four highest-rated, and if there are at least eight companies that each own full-power stations within the market. While the parent companies of NBC, ABC, CBS and Fox are not prohibited from owning a second broadcast network (and all of them, except for ABC, are co-owned with one), an FCC law known as the "dual-network rule" does disallow a single company from owning two or more of the major networks; this came into play in 2019, when ABC's parent company bought most of Fox's assets but was required to leave Fox as a separately owned network.

The FCC also prohibits the airing of "indecent" material over-the-air between 6:00 a.m. and 10:00 pm. Broadcast stations can legally air almost anything they want late at night – and cable networks at all hours. However, nudity and graphic profanity are rare on American television. Though the FCC gives them leeway to air programs containing "indecent" material within its designated watershed period, broadcasters are hesitant to do this, concerned that airing such material would alienate advertisers and encourage the federal government to strengthen regulation of television content. Premium cable networks are exceptions, and often air very racy programming at night, though premium channels often air program content with strong to graphic profanity, violence and nudity in some cases during the daytime hours. Such content is common on pay television services, as they are not subjected to FCC regulations and pressure from advertisers, and often require a subscription to view them. Some networks (such as Playboy TV) are devoted exclusively to "adult" content, specifically pornographic material, and therefore viewers may find scenes of simulated or graphic sexual intercourse and nudity on such channels.

Cable television is largely, but not entirely, unregulated. Cable providers must include local over-the-air stations in their offerings on each system (stations can opt to gain carriage by seeking a must-carry option) and give them low channel numbers, unless the stations decide to demand compensation of any sort (through retransmission consent). The systems cannot carry broadcast network affiliates from other parts of the country (this regulation has largely been openly ignored in recent years during carriage disputes), however cable systems can carry stations from nearby markets if there are no local stations affiliated with one of the major networks (though this is becoming far less common with the shift, particularly since 2006, towards over-the-air stations carrying one network affiliation on their main channel and an affiliation with another network on a digital subchannel, thus allowing these network-affiliated digital subchannels to be carried at least via digital cable).

Cable systems can also air satellite-relayed broadcast stations originating from other areas of the United States, known as superstations (of which there are currently only five around the country), which for the most part are often aired in rural areas and may omit network programming from that station's network affiliation; all superstations, are currently affiliated with a broadcast television network: WPIX in New York City, KWGN-TV in Denver and KTLA in Los Angeles are all affiliated with The CW, and WWOR-TV in Secaucus, New Jersey and WSBK-TV in Boston are affiliated with MyNetworkTV. A few of these superstations once had national distribution, carrying a separate feed that aired different programming than that of the local area feed and even some that also aired on the local feed that is SyndEx-proof (in other words, syndicated programming to which the superstation has obtained full signal rights to air nationally); the two most prominent of these nationally distributed stations were TBS and WGN-TV. TBS, whose former parent Atlanta station WTCG (now WPCH-TV) became the first "basic cable" network to be uplinked to satellite in December 1976, had converted its national feed into a conventional cable channel in October 2007; WGN-TV in Chicago was uplinked in October 1978; its national feed, WGN America, also converted into a traditional cable channel in December 2014, when it dropped all remaining WGN-TV programming. WWOR-TV also once operated a national feed, which ceased operations in January 1997, before the station regained national superstation status as a satellite-exclusive service – through its New York City feed – a few months later.

The FCC has virtually no jurisdiction over the content of programming exclusively broadcast on cable. As a result, anyone is free to create any number of channels or any sort of programming whatsoever without consulting the FCC. The only restrictions are on the ability to secure carriage on cable or satellite (or, failing that, by streaming on Internet television) and securing the rights to programming. Because of this lack of restriction, channel drift (the shift of a channel's programming format away from that which it originally maintained) is much more common in the United States than in other countries.

Because the United States had relatively weak copyright terms until 1976, a large body of older television series have lapsed into the public domain and are thus free to redistribute in any form.

== History of American television ==
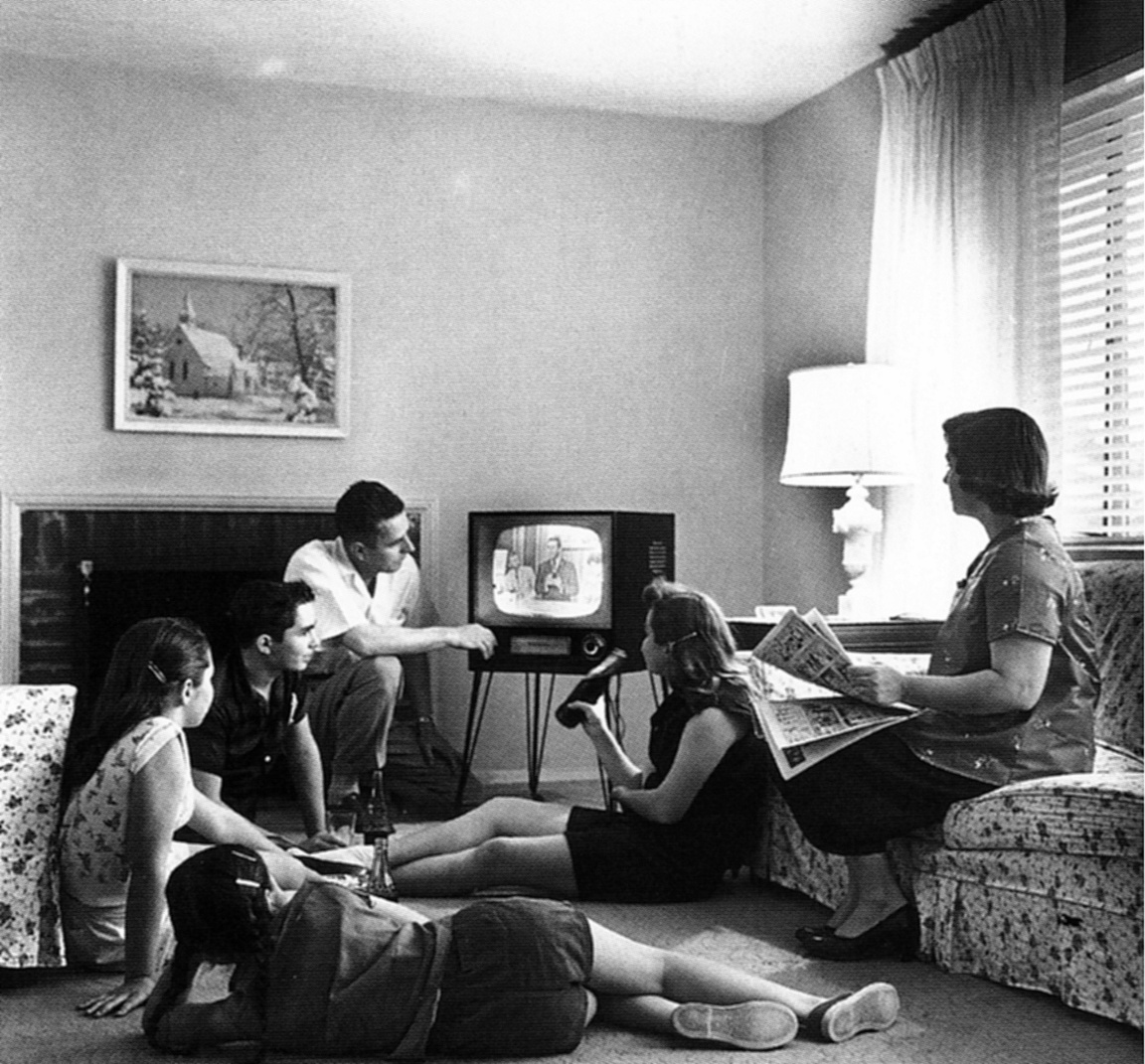
American family watching TV, 1958

Experimental broadcasts debuted in the United States on May 10, 1928, with the launch of the original WGY Television, a joint venture of General Electric's owned-and-operated WGY in Schenectady, New York and Norton Laboratories' WMAK in Lockport, New York. (Norton dropped out of the venture shortly thereafter and eventually folded in 1932 amid disputes with the FCC over its AM allocation. Generally regarded as the first television station in the United States, W3XK in Washington, D.C., started airing on July 2, 1928. Charles Francis Jenkins, a pioneer of early television technology, owned W3XK, which in 1929 upgraded to a 60-line picture after first transmitting 48-line silhouette images via a mechanical scanning mechanism. Despite being the first station to transmit on a regular basis, it was hindered by technical issues and closed during the Great Depression in 1932. Western New York would not get a full-time television station until WBEN-TV launched in 1948.) These early television programs operated using low-bandwidth (and low-fidelity) mechanical television processes. Full-time broadcasts began in the early 1930s, particularly in New York City; these were almost exclusively studio-based shows, among them the murder mystery The Television Ghost, piano lessons and primitive variety shows. These shows and broadcasts ended in 1933, in part because of technological and economic limits caused by the Great Depression.

On April 30, 1939, RCA through its NBC division, introduced the first, regularly scheduled, 441-line electronic television service in the United States over New York City's W2XBS (today's WNBC) from a transmitter atop The Empire State Building as well as placing RCA television receivers on sale in the New York City vicinity. Television receivers were also sold by General Electric, DuMont Laboratories and other manufacturers during his period. NBC rival CBS established their own electronic television station in New York at the time, W2XAB (today's WCBS-TV) as well as the DuMont Laboratories establishing their station W2XWV (today's WNYW). Although television sets were available for sale during this period (1939–1941) and three channels were operating in New York City, sales were slow, primarily due to a lack of compelling programming, limited broadcast schedules and the high price of the sets. In 1941, The National Television Systems Committee (NTSC) standardized on a 525-line system, and authorized the official start of advertising-based, commercial television. This would provide the basis for television across the country through the end of the century. On July 1, 1941, W2XBS became commercial WNBT (now WNBC) and broadcast the first paid advertisement for the Bulova Watch Company. On the same day, the CBS station became commercial WCBW (now WCBS-TV).

Television development halted with the onset of World War II, but a few pioneer stations remained on the air throughout the war, primarily WNBT, WCBW and WABD (the former W2XWV, which became commercially licensed in 1944, owned by the DuMont Television Network, now WNYW) in New York City, WRGB in Schenectady, New York (owned by General Electric), WPTZ (now KYW-TV) in Philadelphia (owned by Philco), W9XBK (now WBBM-TV) in Chicago, as well as W6XAO (now KCBS-TV) and W6XYZ (now KTLA) in Los Angeles. When that conflict ended, these stations expanded their broadcast schedules, and many other organizations applied for television station licenses.

After a flood of television license applications, the FCC froze the application process for new applicants in 1948, due to concerns over station interference. There were barely more than 100 stations operating at the end of the freeze as of 1952, concentrated in many (but not all) major cities. After four years of deliberation, the FCC ended the license freeze. It reorganized the UHF band for television, then began handing out broadcasting licenses on both the UHF and VHF bands, with the highest concentration of license grants and station sign-ons occurring between 1953 and 1956. Many successful VHF stations launched. By comparison, UHF television reception at this time required either purchasing a more expensive television with a UHF tuner in it – as UHF tuners were not mandated by law in sets – or buying a conversion kit that added the band to VHF televisions. Both of these prevented consumer adoption of UHF in the mid-1950s, and most UHF channels which went to air during this time period did not survive.

A brief dispute over the system to use for color broadcasts occurred at this time, but was soon settled. Half of all U.S. households had television sets by 1955, though color was a premium feature for many years (most households able to purchase television sets could only afford black-and-white models, and few programs were broadcast in color until the mid-1960s).

Many of the earliest television programs were modified versions of well-established radio shows. Barn dances and opries were regular staples of early television, as were the first variety shows. Reruns of film shorts (such as Looney Tunes, Our Gang and The Three Stooges) were also staples of early television and to a certain extent remain popular today, well after those film shorts mostly stopped being produced in the 1960s. The 1950s saw the first flowering of the genres that would distinguish television from movies and radio: talk shows like The Jack Paar Show and sitcoms like I Love Lucy. Although sitcoms were a radio fixture since the late 1930s (many 1940s radio sitcoms jumped directly to television), television allowed far greater use of physical comedy, an advantage that early television sitcoms used to its full potential.

Other popular genres in early television were westerns, police procedurals, suspense thrillers and soap operas, all of which were adapted from the radio medium. Anthology and wheel series thrived in the so-called "Golden Age of Television", but eventually faded in popularity by the 1970s. The big band remote, for the most part, did not survive (a victim of the concurrent start of the rock era), with two exceptions: The Lawrence Welk Show, a big band-driven musical variety show, ran from 1951 until Welk's retirement in 1982 and in reruns from then onward (which eventually moved from commercial to public television syndication), and Guy Lombardo's annual New Year's Eve big-band remotes ran until 1979, two years after Lombardo's death. Game shows were also a major part of the early part of television, aided by massive prizes unheard of in the radio era; however, the pressure to keep the programs entertaining led to the quiz show scandals, in which it was revealed many of the popular high-stakes games were rigged or outright scripted. The Saturday morning cartoons, animated productions made specifically for television (and, accordingly, with much tighter budgets and more limited animation), also debuted in the late 1950s. Major advancements during the 1950s include VHF band expansion and UHF frequency opening to expand the number of usable channels. The NTSC color television standard was approved in 1953, regular color broadcasts started in 1954, and maximum video resolution increased from 525 to 625 lines.

These advancements significantly enhanced viewers' television experiences and hastened the incorporation of television into everyday life. The typical American household was watching television for more than five hours every day by 1960. Television had become a significant cultural and economic force.

Broadcast television stations in the United States were primarily transmitted on the VHF band (channels 2–13) through the mid-1960s. It was not until the All-Channel Receiver Act of 1964 that UHF broadcasting became a feasible medium.

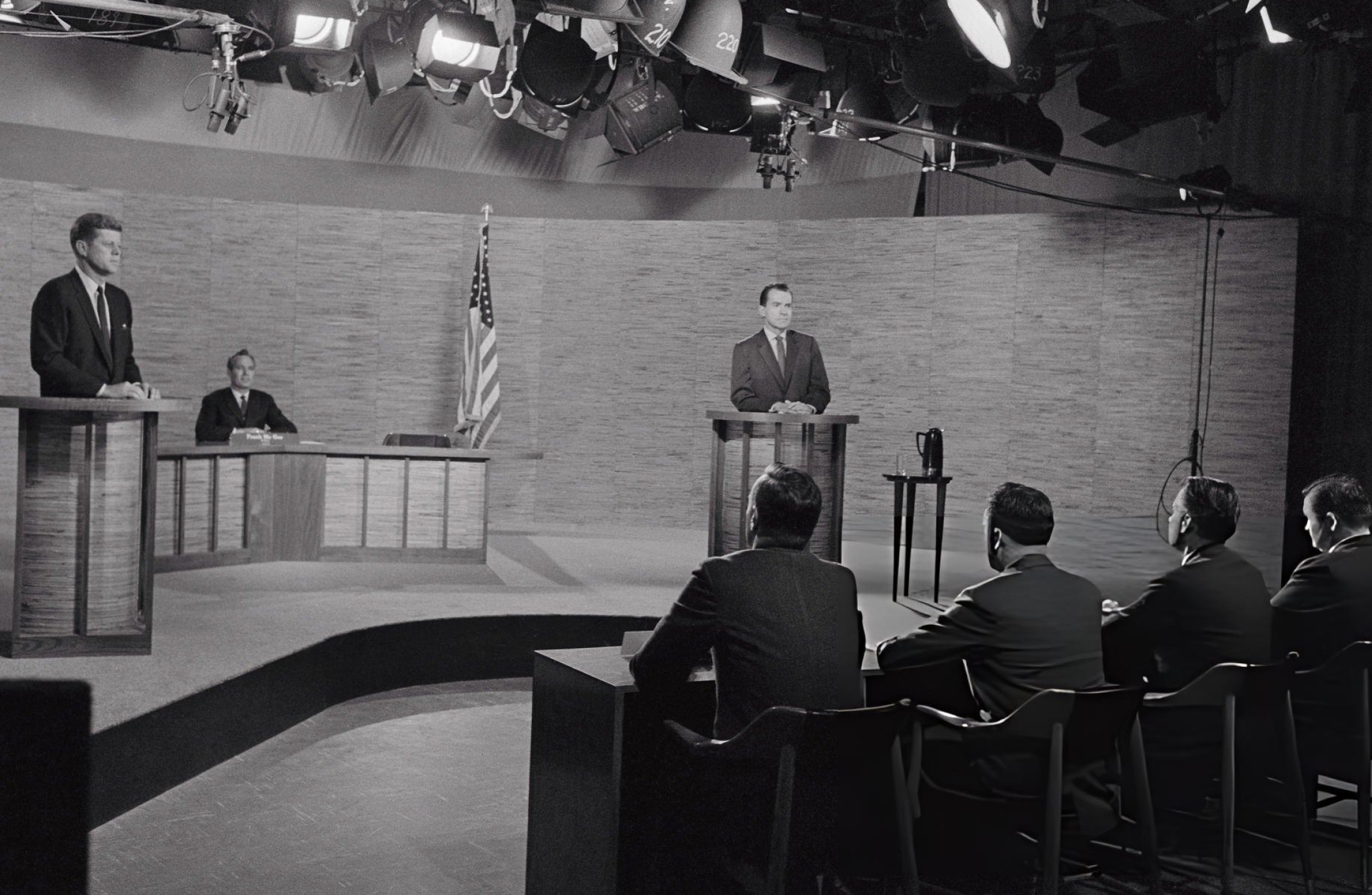
John F. Kennedy and Richard Nixon participated in the first televised presidential debate in Washington, D.C. in 1960.

The quality of American television underwent a marked decline in the late 1950s and early 1960s as anthology series disappeared from the network schedules in favor of an oversaturation of westerns, rural and fantasy sitcoms, cheaply animated cartoons and often-violent action-adventure series. Newton Minow famously lambasted the networks for creating a "vast wasteland" of bad television in his 1961 speech "Television and the Public Interest." Though Minow's attempts to exhort the networks into producing better programming failed to make a major impact, his advocacy for UHF (to expand viewer choices) and non-commercial educational television had a much longer legacy.

Over the course of the 1960s and 1970s, concurrent with the development of color television, the evolution of television led to an event colloquially known as the rural purge; genres such as the panel game show, western, variety show, barn dance and rural-oriented sitcom all met their demise in favor of newer, more modern series targeted at wealthier suburban and urban viewers. The rural purge was largely initiated by CBS and other influential networks, impacting the entirety of the industry. Around the same time, videotape became a more affordable alternative to film for recording programs.

Stations across the country also produced their own local programs. Usually carried live, they ranged from simple advertisements to game shows and children's shows that often featured clowns and other offbeat characters. Local programs could often be popular and profitable, but concerns about product promotion led them to almost completely disappear by the mid-1970s. The last remaining locally originated shows on American television as of 2016 are local newscasts, public affairs shows and some brokered programming (such as talk-lifestyle shows) paid for by advertisers.

Subscription television networks emerged in the late 1970s, first as over-the-air encrypted enterprises such as OnTV and SelecTV. Subscription television largely migrated to cable television through the early 1980s, as providers began to offer dedicated channels alongside local and out-of-market broadcast stations and cable service gradually expanded to more metropolitan areas. Analog television receive-only had a brief uptick in popularity during the mid-1980s, but never achieved competitive parity with cable providers of the time. Direct-broadcast satellite television experienced its breakout in the mid-1990s, with the emergence of digital (DSS) transmission; it has been growing in significance since then – spurring the emergence of multinational conglomerates such as Fox. As the number of outlets for potential new television channels increased, this also introduced the threat of audience fracturing, in that it would become more difficult to attain a critical mass of viewers in this highly competitive market.

Infomercials were legalized in 1984, approximately the same time that cable television became widespread. Over the course of the 1980s and 1990s, stations began airing infomercials – as well as news and entertainment programs – throughout the night instead of signing off; infomercials also began to overtake other less-watched dayparts (such as weekends and during the daytime), which forced series that would otherwise be syndicated onto cable networks or off the air entirely. Cable networks have also begun selling infomercial space, usually in multiple-hour blocks in the early morning hours, while some dedicated channels devoted to infomercials have also launched since the early 1990s. Infomercials have earned a reputation as a medium for advertising scams and products of dubious quality, although by the same token, they have proven to be a successful method of selling products.

As ratings declined on daytime over-the-air network broadcast television, game shows and soap operas that were the staples of the 1970s and 1980s began to disappear going into the 21st century, with both genres becoming near-obsolete by 2020. They were gradually replaced by much cheaper and more lowbrow tabloid talk shows, locally produced news, and even infomercials. Binding arbitration court shows became popular in these timeslots beginning in the late 1990s.

In the late 1990s, the U.S. began to deploy digital television, transitioning it into being the standard transmission method for over-the-air broadcasts. The major broadcast networks began transitioning to recording their programs in high definition (HD); prime time programs were the first to convert to the format, with daytime shows eventually being converted to HD beginning in the mid-2000s; the upgrade to full high-definition network schedules, at least among the conventional English language broadcast networks, was fully completed by September 2014 when the last standard-definition programs upgraded to HD. A law passed by Congress in 2006 required over-the-air stations to cease analog broadcasts in 2009, with the end of analog television arriving on June 12 of that year (originally set for February 17, before Congress delayed it due to concerns about national household penetration of digital television by viewers reliant on antennas for receive programming in advance the transition). Low-power television stations originally had until September 2015 to terminate analog broadcasts, a deadline that was later postponed and eventually took effect in July 2021. The 2016 United States wireless spectrum auction further compressed the UHF band, eliminating channels 38 through 51, and was completed in 2020. Most of the remaining stations on analog in 2021 were stations that exploited a loophole to carry a radio station on the audio feed of analog channel 6, which was audible on 87.7 MHz, a frequency that can be tuned in on most FM radios; a limited number of stations that were using that loophole were granted special temporary authority to continue broadcasting their analog audio feeds while shifting their video feeds to the new and upcoming digital television standard, ATSC 3.0, which is being phased in across the United States in the early 2020s with no hard transition date yet set.

The late 1990s also saw the invention of digital video recorders. While the ability to record a television program for home viewing was possible with the earlier VCRs, that medium was a bulky mechanical tape medium that was far less convenient than the all-digital technology that DVRs use (DVD recorders also began to be sold around this time, though this is also less convenient than the DVR technology since DVD discs are somewhat more fragile than videotapes, although both mediums allow to some extent for longer-term viewing than most DVRs). DVR technology allowed wide-scale time shifting of programming, which had a negative impact on programming in time slots outside of prime time by allowing viewers to watch their favorite programs on demand. It also put pressure on advertisers, since DVRs make it relatively easy to skip over commercials (satellite provider Dish Network's Hopper technology, which eliminates commercials entirely, was even the subject of lawsuits by the major networks during the early and mid-2010s due to fears over diluted advertising revenue).

During the 2000s, the major development in American television programming was the growth of reality television, which proved to be an inexpensive and entertaining alternative to scripted prime time programming. The process of nonlinear video editing and digital recording allowed for much easier and less expensive editing of mass amounts of video, making reality television more viable than it had been in previous decades. All four major broadcast networks carry at least one long-running reality franchise in their lineup at any given time of the year.

== Social consequences of television ==
Television had, and still has, an array of social consequences, including historical, political, and economic consequences, as well as broad discrimination. Television was gaining popularity and becoming available to the public as the Vietnam War was taking place. Prior to the presence of television, the American public had little knowledge of the circumstances of war, and television provided constant and current graphic images and stories of war coverage. Broadcasting of these stories led to change in the public opinion of the United States involvement in the Vietnam War and there were more unfavorable views among the public. The Vietnam War became known as "The Television War", as it was the first broadly televised conflict and provided frequent news coverage and images of the war. Television is not credited as being a factor in the United States removing troops from Vietnam, but rather the Watergate Scandal, funding for the war, and peace treaty are.

Television influenced the political sphere within the United States. The presence of television created a new platform for candidates to campaign, and how these campaigns work have changed throughout time. The first political advertisements consisted of candidates on their political viewpoints and their opinions on current issues within the world. This began the "selling" of political candidates, by adding a song or jingle to sway public opinion in their favor. As time progressed, it became more common for political advertisements to be used to persuade the public to not vote for a particular candidate due to their viewpoints, ideas, and/or personal characteristics. On September 26, 1960, presidential candidates John F. Kennedy and Richard M. Nixon participated in the first live, on-air presidential debate. Political debates have grown in popularity and now reach audiences in the tens of millions.

The first television broadcast occurred on September 7, 1927, when there was a very limited number of televisions owned by the public across the country. Within the first two decades of the invention and distribution of television, the average price of the television set was between $200 and $600. This price equated to roughly 15-22% of the average annual salary during the 1930s and 1940s. The upper-class society was the target audience of this new technology, as those in the lower-class did not have the income to support such a purchase. Not only did this limit television access to those of the upper class, but it also limited television to particular regions of the United States. During the 1930s and 1940s, the upper-class lived in primarily populated and urban cities, including New York City, Chicago, and Philadelphia. After World War II and the Industrial Revolution, the price of televisions decreased significantly and became more attainable for those who were not in the position to purchase one previously.

When television first began consistent broadcasting programs in the late 1930s and 1940s, there were only four networks available: NBC, ABC, CBS, and DuMont Television Network. In 1959, Max Robinson became the first African American nightly news television anchor. During Robinson's news segments, he was covered by the broadcasting company's logo. He was fired the following day after having the logo removed from his segment. Robinson then went on to work at WTOP-TV and WRC-TV, gaining fame for his presence in the Civil Rights Movement. Throughout the next several decades, news anchors continued to be predominantly white males. Following the Civil Rights Movement, there was a stronger presence of African American news anchors, although they are still underrepresented. In the United States, only 6.4% of news anchors are African American while African Americans account for over 14% of the United States population.

== See also ==
- Big Three television networks
- Cable television in the United States
- Communications in the United States
- Fourth television network
- High-definition television in the United States
- List of television stations in the United States
- List of United States pay television channels
- List of United States over-the-air television networks
- List of United States television markets
- List of American television awards
- List of years in television
- List of years in American television
- Satellite television in the United States
- Television news in the United States
- United States cable news
