= Owned-and-operated television stations in the United States =

U.S. television stations owned by their own broadcast networks

In the United States, owned-and-operated television stations (frequently abbreviated as O&Os) constitute only a portion of their parent television networks' station bodies, due to ownership limits imposed by the Federal Communications Commission (FCC). Previously, the total number of television stations owned by any company (including a television network) can only reach a maximum of 39% of all U.S. households; in the past, the ownership limit was much lower, and was determined by a specific number of television stations rather than basing the limits on total market coverage. The new rules replace the defined cap with a case-by-case review that prioritizes public interest.

== Distribution ==
At the dawn of the American television industry, each company was only allowed to own a total of five television stations around the country. As such, when the networks launched their television operations, they found it more advantageous to put their five owned-and-operated stations in large media markets that had more households (and therefore, denser populations) on the belief that it would result in higher revenue. In other markets, they opted to run their programming on stations through contractual arrangements, making them affiliates instead.

The five-station limit posed a problem for the DuMont Television Network, the first attempt at a "fourth" television network. Paramount Pictures, which had owned KTLA (channel 5) in Los Angeles and WBKB (channel 4, now WBBM-TV on channel 2) in Chicago, owned a share of the network. However, the FCC declared that Paramount controlled DuMont and thus forbade the network and the studio from acquiring any more stations. This was one of the factors that led to DuMont shutting down in August 1956.

For much of the era from 1958 to 1986, the major network-owned stations were distributed as follows: ABC, CBS and NBC each owned stations in the top three markets (New York City, Los Angeles and Chicago). Between 1958 and 1965, fourth-ranked Philadelphia housed CBS-owned WCAU-TV (channel 10) and NBC-owned WRCV-TV (channel 3, now KYW-TV), a station which NBC had acquired two years earlier through a trade with Westinghouse Broadcasting in return for NBC's television and radio stations in Cleveland. The FCC reversed the trade in 1965 and NBC regained control of the Cleveland television station, which is today known as WKYC. Each network owned stations in other markets where the other networks did not: in addition to Cleveland, these were ABC's KGO-TV (channel 7) in San Francisco and WXYZ-TV (channel 7) in Detroit, NBC's WRC-TV (channel 4) in Washington, D.C., and CBS' KMOX-TV (channel 4, now KMOV) in St. Louis.

As a result of a revision to the FCC's media ownership rules in 1999, a company can now own any number of television stations with a combined market reach of less than 39% of the country, but cannot own two of the four highest-rated stations in any market. Still, O&Os in the United States are primarily found in large markets such as New York City, Los Angeles and Chicago, among others. Despite that, network-owned stations can still be found in smaller markets (for example, KFSN-TV (channel 30) in Fresno, California is an ABC O&O; WOGX (channel 51) in Ocala, Florida, is technically a Fox O&O, but is operated out of the studios of and serves as a semi-satellite of the network's Orlando O&O WOFL).

== UHF vs. VHF ==
=== Early development ===
Local television stations in the United States were concentrated on the VHF dial (channels 2–13) in the early days of the industry. However, it soon became apparent that the twelve channels available on the VHF dial would not be sufficient to meet the demands of the growing industry. As a result, in 1952, the FCC opened up a new spectrum of frequencies on the UHF dial (channels 14–83) for terrestrial television. As an incentive for companies to operate UHF stations, the FCC relaxed the ownership limit for a given entity from five to seven stations, provided that no more than five were on the VHF dial.

With this opportunity to expand its roster of O&Os, NBC bought WBUF-TV (channel 17) in Buffalo in 1955 and WKNB-TV (channel 30) in New Britain, Connecticut (near Hartford) in 1957, and changed WKNB's call letters to WNBC-TV (the present-day WNBC in New York City used the WRCA-TV callsign from 1954 to 1960). The network wanted to see if a UHF station could effectively compete against VHF stations, and attempted to make the stations more competitive by investing in significant equipment upgrades. However, WBUF consistently ranked behind its VHF competitors, WGR-TV (channel 2, now WGRZ) and WBEN-TV (channel 4, now WIVB-TV). Similarly, WNBC consistently rated behind VHF competitor WNHC-TV (channel 8, now WTNH); WNBC faced an additional problem as its signal was not strong enough to cover New Haven and western Connecticut (nearly all of Connecticut is part of the Hartford-New Haven market).

By the time the FCC allocated additional VHF stations to Buffalo (WKBW-TV, channel 7) and Hartford (WTIC-TV channel 3, now WFSB), NBC decided that its experiment was a lost cause, and put WBUF and WNBC up for sale. While it found a buyer for WNBC (which retained its NBC affiliation), there were no takers for WBUF, and it went off the air in 1958. NBC then affiliated with WGR-TV, where it remains to this day. NBC donated WBUF's license and some of its equipment to PBS member station WNED-TV, which took over the channel 17 frequency in 1959 (due to a number of transactions, the WBUF-TV license is now held by WNLO and the channel 17 frequency was later held by WBXZ-LD; WNED still holds the virtual channel 17 in the Buffalo market, but has not advertised it since the early 2000s).

Similarly, CBS bought UHF stations WGTH-TV (channel 18) in Hartford and WOKY-TV (channel 19, later on channel 18) in Milwaukee in 1955, and changed their call letters to WHCT-TV and WXIX-TV, respectively. However, CBS' ratings were astonishingly low in those markets. In 1959, CBS decided to move its Hartford and Milwaukee affiliations to VHF stations WTIC-TV and WITI-TV (channel 6) respectively, and sold off what became WHCT (now Univision affiliate WUVN) and WXIX (now CW affiliate WVTV) – ironically, CBS was sent back to the UHF dial in Milwaukee following an affiliation switch in December 1994, which saw WITI becoming a Fox station, while its former CBS affiliation moved to WDJT-TV (channel 58).

=== 1980s and beyond ===
The underperformance of early UHF O&Os (and UHF stations in general) was primarily attributed to the fact that manufacturers were not required to equip new television sets with UHF tuners until 1964, following the 1961 passage of the All-Channel Receiver Act. While the technical problems which plagued early UHF stations had largely disappeared by the 1980s with the spread of UHF tuners and (in particular) cable television, UHF stations in many television markets continued to be compared unfavorably against their VHF counterparts, often simply by virtue of viewer loyalty. As such, the "Big Three" networks (ABC, NBC, and CBS) were still not inclined to acquire UHF stations as network-owned outlets; however, ABC did keep Fresno's KFSN (which was a CBS affiliate at the time the deal was reached) after the network merged with Capital Cities Communications in 1986, as KFSN was the highest-rated station in a market where all of the full-power television stations were on the UHF band, along with the fact it saw the advantage of having a statewide network to share California news coverage and events with, using the resources of KFSN, KGO-TV, and KABC-TV.

By the time the Fox network launched in October 1986, many of the nation's VHF stations were already affiliated with one of the "Big Three" networks. As a result, Fox had little choice but to affiliate with UHF stations in most markets upon its launch (the few VHF outlets that the network initially affiliated with, a few of which were owned by Fox itself, were in a handful of large and mid-sized markets; however, Fox was forced to align with a UHF outlet in a few markets where it initially approached a VHF independent station for an affiliation offer and was turned down). The network even had UHF O&Os in markets like Chicago (WFLD, channel 32), Houston (KRIV, channel 26), and Dallas (KDAF, channel 33). However, by the time that the National Football League awarded Fox the rights to broadcast games from the National Football Conference in 1993, it became convinced that the network would not be viable without more VHF affiliates. As such, in May 1994, the network arranged a deal with New World Communications, which saw nearly all of that group's stations (most of which were VHF outlets) becoming Fox affiliates. Fox then acquired New World Communications outright in July 1996, and those VHF stations (including one in Dallas) became Fox owned-and-operated stations in the process. The network, however, did acquire more UHF O&Os in subsequent years, including Philadelphia's WTXF-TV (channel 29) in 1995, Orlando's WOFL (channel 35) in 2002, and Charlotte's WJZY (channel 46) in 2013.

As a result of the New World deal, CBS lost its longtime Detroit affiliate WJBK (channel 2) to Fox. CBS then unsuccessfully sought to affiliate with other stations in the market before it eventually purchased low-rated ethnic independent WGPR-TV (channel 62) and changed the station's callsign to WWJ-TV (a callsign once used by one of the stations that CBS approached for an affiliation, WDIV-TV) in 1995. The station continues to receive low ratings, and after a brief attempt at running an 11:00 p.m. newscast from 2001 to 2002 that was produced by sister station WKBD-TV (which voluntarily shut down its news department shortly afterward to enter into a short-lived news share agreement with WXYZ-TV), was the only CBS owned-and-operated station without a local news presence until 2009, when a morning newscast produced by the Detroit Free Press premiered (that program, First Forecast Mornings, was canceled in 2012). CBS also bought KEYE-TV (channel 42) in Austin, Texas from the Granite Broadcasting Corporation in 2000, five years after that station took the CBS affiliation from KTBC, another former New World station that switched to Fox.

NBC would not buy a UHF O&O again until 1995, when it acquired WNCN (channel 17) in Goldsboro, North Carolina (part of the Raleigh–Durham market). It subsequently purchased KNSD (channel 39) in San Diego in 1996, and it repurchased channel 30 in Hartford, now WVIT, in 1997.

Currently, most American networks have at least one owned-and-operated station on a UHF frequency (which now usually corresponds to the station's physical digital channel, particularly in cases where a station previously operated on a VHF channel, which now corresponds to its virtual channel, prior to the 2009 digital television transition). Newer networks, such as Univision and Ion Television, even have mostly UHF O&Os.

== Ownership and network changes ==
Mergers, acquisitions, and other business deals between television networks and other companies sometimes require a network to sell off an O&O, in order to stay under the ownership cap. In addition, networks may choose to sell off O&Os in smaller markets in order to concentrate on their stations in larger markets, or to give themselves leeway to purchase stations in other growing markets. The following are examples of transactions involving owned-and-operated stations in the United States:

=== DuMont Television Network ===
The DuMont network found itself in financial trouble in 1954, and decided to sell off its Pittsburgh owned-and-operated station, WDTV (channel 2), which was the only commercial VHF station in what was then a top ten television market in the United States. Westinghouse Electric Corporation bought the station for $6.75 million, and changed its call letters to KDKA-TV (that station now operates as a CBS O&O, as a result of the network's 1995 merger with Westinghouse).

However, even with income generated from the sale, DuMont was never able to recover from its problems, and the network shut down in August 1956. Its two other owned-and-operated stations, WABD (channel 5, now WNYW) in New York City and WTTG (channel 5) in Washington, D.C., became independent stations and remained so until October 1986, when they became Fox O&Os at the network's inception.

=== CBS ===
In 1986, CBS sold its longtime owned-and-operated station in St. Louis, KMOX-TV, to Viacom (then a separate entity from CBS, which merged with the network in 2000 before splitting into separate companies five years later; the two would re-merge to become ViacomCBS on December 4, 2019; that company was later renamed Paramount Global and currently become Paramount Skydance on August 7, 2025). Viacom changed the station's callsign to KMOV, then sold it to Belo Corporation in 1997, in a three-way swap that also saw Viacom acquiring KSTW (channel 11) in Seattle–Tacoma from Cox Enterprises, and that company in return getting KIRO-TV (channel 7) from Belo. Belo merged with the Gannett Company in 2013; as a condition of the deal, KMOV was acquired by the Meredith Corporation in 2014. CBS purchased KOVR (channel 13) in Stockton, California from the Sinclair Broadcast Group in May 2005.

On February 7, 2007, CBS announced the sale of its owned-and-operated stations in Salt Lake City (KUTV and its satellite in St. George, Utah, KUSG) and Austin (KEYE-TV) to Four Points Media Group, a holding company owned by Cerberus Capital Management as part of a group deal which also included two CW owned-and-operated stations (WTVX in West Palm Beach and WLWC in Providence), one low-power MyNetworkTV affiliate and one low-power Azteca América affiliate (both located in West Palm Beach). Six days later, CBS announced that it was swapping its O&O in Green Bay, WFRV-TV (channel 5), and its satellite in Escanaba, Michigan, WJMN-TV (channel 3), to Liberty Media in exchange for common CBS stock held by Liberty Media; the sale of WFRV/WJMN closed on April 18, 2007. The Four Points transaction was approved by the FCC on November 21, 2007, and was finalized on January 10, 2008. In 2012, the Four Points stations were acquired by the Sinclair Broadcast Group; WFRV/WJMN was sold to the Nexstar Broadcasting Group in 2011.

In 2025, CBS announced that its affiliation in Atlanta would move to WUPA, a station that CBS had owned since 2001, beginning on August 16 of that year; the change came after Gray Media, owners of the then-affiliate WANF declined to renew its CBS affiliation.

=== NBC ===
For much of the modern television era, NBC did not have an owned-and-operated station in Philadelphia. In 1955, NBC forced Westinghouse to trade its NBC-affiliated Philadelphia cluster of KYW-AM (1060) and WPTZ-TV (channel 3) to NBC in exchange for WTAM-AM-FM and WNBK-TV in Cleveland. Westinghouse only agreed to the trade after NBC threatened not only to yank its programming from WPTZ, but also Westinghouse-owned WBZ-TV (channel 4) in Boston. NBC changed the callsigns of the Philadelphia stations to WRCV-AM-TV, while Westinghouse changed the Cleveland stations' callsigns to KYW-AM-FM-TV. NBC's then-ownership of Philadelphia's channel 3 was cited by CBS when it purchased its then-affiliate WCAU-TV in 1958, despite FCC rules at the time barring companies from owning stations with overlapping signals, as WRCA/WRCV did.

In 1965, NBC was forced to reverse the trade on orders from the Federal Communications Commission and the United States Department of Justice. WRCV-TV's callsign was then changed to KYW-TV to match its radio cousin. When NBC regained control of the Cleveland stations, it changed their callsigns to WKYC-AM-FM-TV, because of the AM station's popularity as "KY11". It sold the radio stations in 1972, but kept WKYC-TV until 1990, when majority control of the station was sold to Multimedia, Inc. (which later merged with the Gannett Company in 1995); NBC remained minority owner of WKYC-TV until 1999 when it sold its remaining interest to Gannett. NBC continued to pursue efforts to acquire an owned-and-operated station in Philadelphia, especially when KYW became its weakest major-market affiliate for much of the 1980s. However, NBC was unsuccessful until 1995, when it won a bidding war for longtime CBS O&O WCAU-TV during the 1994–1996 United States broadcast television realignment.

In 1997, LIN TV Corporation sold a 76% stake in Dallas-Fort Worth's KXAS-TV (channel 5) to NBC in exchange for 24% of San Diego's KNSD; therefore, NBC owned 76% of both stations. Although this was not defined as a traditional O&O arrangement, NBC's controlling interest in the stations allowed them to be considered NBC owned-and-operated stations. In February 2013, LIN pulled out of the joint venture, giving NBC 100% ownership of the two stations.

In December 2001, NBC acquired an O&O in the San Francisco Bay Area, when it purchased San Jose-based KNTV (channel 11) from the Granite Broadcasting Corporation; the sale to NBC was finalized in April 2002. Prior to the purchase, KNTV had been affiliated with ABC for most of its history, while NBC was affiliated with KRON-TV (channel 4); by 2000, ABC wished for its own longtime San Francisco O&O station, KGO-TV, to exclusively serve the San Jose portion of the market and terminated its 40-year affiliation with KNTV; while KRON, which had recently been sold to Young Broadcasting, opted to end its NBC affiliation after 52 years in the wake of a dispute with NBC (which lost a bidding war for the station to Young as KRON's longtime owners, the Chronicle Publishing Company, sold off its media properties) over the terms of the renewing the station's affiliation contract. Granite, which had been operating KNTV as a WB affiliate since it ended its affiliation with ABC, offered to pay NBC a then unheard-of annual payment of $37 million for the station to become an NBC affiliate, an offer which NBC accepted before later finalizing the outright acquisition (back in 1960, ABC allowed KNTV to be its affiliate because it agreed to not serve San Jose directly, but focus more on the Monterey Bay area, which was too far south to receive KGO's over-the-air signal clearly; KNTV also agreed to transmit at a lower power so as not to unreasonably overlap with KGO's signal; upon the July 2000 termination of the affiliation agreement, ABC added KGO to cable systems in the Salinas-Monterey area to compensate for the loss of ABC programming on KNTV, a situation that continued until the summer of 2011, when the area's NBC affiliate, Hearst Television-owned KSBW-TV (channel 8), relaunched its second digital subchannel to serve as a separate ABC affiliate for the area).

On March 19, 2008, NBC announced its intention to sell two additional O&Os: WTVJ in Miami and WVIT in New Britain-Hartford, Connecticut. On July 18 of that year, it was announced that WTVJ would be sold to Post-Newsweek Stations (now the Graham Media Group), then owner of Miami's ABC affiliate WPLG (channel 10). Had the FCC approved this deal, it would have resulted in the Miami market being home to the largest duopoly in the United States between two "Big Three" or "Big Four" network affiliates. WVIT was later withdrawn from the selling block, as all of the offers made for that station were much lower than NBC's asking price. The sale of WTVJ also fell through due to the delay in FCC approval for the deal, the election of Barack Obama as president effectively de facto signaling a rejection of the deal from a Democratic-led FCC board of commissioners was coming, and public opposition over the proposed sale of WTVJ to the owner of another major network station.

In 2016, NBC announced that it would launch a new O&O in Boston (WBTS-LD) on January 1, 2017, replacing WHDH-TV as the network's Boston affiliate.

=== ABC ===
Detroit's WXYZ-TV had been an ABC owned-and-operated station from its sign-on in 1948, as WXYZ radio (1270 AM, now WXYT) had been an affiliate of ABC radio's predecessor, the NBC Blue Network. However, when Capital Cities Communications acquired ABC in 1985, the combined assets of the new company exceeded the FCC's ownership limit at the time. As such, the network opted to sell WXYZ to the E. W. Scripps Company, having remained with ABC ever since then as an affiliate of the network.

During the series of network affiliation switches that was spurred by Fox's 1994 deal with New World Communications, ABC bought two stations in markets adjacent to Detroit: WTVG (channel 13) in Toledo, Ohio and WJRT (channel 12) in Flint, Michigan – specifically in order to keep some fringe suburban coverage of its programming in the Detroit market, in the event that Scripps would attempt to affiliate WXYZ-TV with another network, resulting in a possible move of ABC to a lower-tier station in the market. Though WXYZ stayed with ABC after Scripps agreed to keep that station affiliated with the network in exchange for affiliation deals with stations that the company owned in other cities, ABC decided to retain ownership of WTVG and WJRT.

Capital Cities also owned two CBS affiliates – Fresno's KFSN and Raleigh-Durham's WTVD (channel 11) – and chose to switch them both to ABC. CBS programming moved to former ABC affiliates in the two markets, WRAL-TV (channel 5) in Raleigh-Durham and KGPE (channel 47) in Fresno; WRAL was one of CBS's strongest affiliates until it switched to NBC in 2016, instead becoming one of NBC's strongest affiliates.

On November 3, 2010, ABC reached an agreement to sell WJRT and WTVG back to former owner SJL Broadcasting, amidst speculation that The Walt Disney Company might spin off ABC; both stations retained their ABC affiliations (SJL then flipped the stations to Gray Television, at a significant profit, in July 2014). When the sale was completed, KFSN in Fresno (at the time ranked as the 55th largest media market) would then become the smallest English-language owned-and-operated major network station by market size (not counting satellites and semi-satellites). The sale was completed on April 1, 2011. The Disney spin-off of ABC has never occurred, mainly due to insider trading allegations that scuttled the deal.

=== Fox ===
In 1987, Fox purchased its Boston affiliate, WFXT (channel 25). The network's then-parent company News Corporation (whose entertainment properties largely became part of the restructured 21st Century Fox through its July 2013 spin-off of its publishing division) also owned The Boston Herald, requiring Fox to obtain a temporary cross-ownership waiver for the station. When the waiver to retain ownership of both the newspaper and television station expired, WFXT was sold to the Boston Celtics of the National Basketball Association (NBA). The Celtics could not survive as a broadcaster, and Fox purchased WFXT a second time in 1995 after the Herald was sold.

As a result of the aforementioned Fox/New World partnership, Fox had to sell off its original O&Os in Dallas (KDAF) and Atlanta (WATL, channel 36), respectively selling them to Renaissance Broadcasting and Qwest Broadcasting. KDFW (channel 4) and WAGA-TV (channel 5) became Fox owned-and-operated stations in the respective markets after Fox Television Stations merged with New World Communications (KDAF is now a CW affiliate owned by Tribune Broadcasting, which ironically acquired both Qwest and Renaissance during the late 1990s, and held a partial ownership stake in Qwest; WATL, also a former WB affiliate, is now a MyNetworkTV affiliate owned by Tegna).

On June 13, 2007, Fox announced its intention to sell nine of its owned-and-operated stations: WJW (channel 8) in Cleveland, Ohio; KDVR (channel 31) in Denver, Colorado; KTVI (channel 2) in St. Louis, Missouri; WDAF-TV (channel 4) in Kansas City, Missouri; WITI in Milwaukee, Wisconsin; KSTU (channel 13) in Salt Lake City, Utah; WHBQ-TV (channel 13) in Memphis, Tennessee; WBRC (channel 6) in Birmingham, Alabama and WGHP (channel 8) in Greensboro, North Carolina. On December 21 of that year, it was announced that eight of the stations – WHBQ being the only one not included – would be sold to Local TV, a broadcast holding company controlled by the private equity firm Oak Hill Capital Partners; the sale closed on July 14, 2008.

Of the eight former Fox O&Os involved in the sale to Local TV, WBRC ended up being traded to Raycom Media on March 31, 2009, in exchange for Richmond, Virginia CBS affiliate WTVR-TV (channel 6); WBRC was subsequently acquired by Gray Television as part of its merger with Raycom, which was completed on January 2, 2019. WHBQ was later withdrawn from the selling block after Fox failed to find a suitable buyer for the station, as both Local TV and Raycom both already owned stations in that market (WREG (channel 3) and WMC-TV (channel 5), respectively) which would easily put them over the FCC's market ownership caps, and the only other buyer that might have been interested – Newport Television – already owned two stations in Memphis at the time: WPTY-TV (channel 24, now WATN-TV) and WLMT (channel 30). The remaining seven former Fox O&Os were acquired by Tribune Broadcasting as part of its purchase of Local TV, an acquisition that closed on December 27, 2013. Sinclair Broadcast Group would announce its acquisition of Tribune in 2017, which would have seen Fox reacquire WJW, KSTU, and KDVR and acquire WSFL-TV (channel 39) in Miami, KSWB-TV (channel 69) in San Diego, KTXL (channel 40) in Sacramento, and KCPQ-TV (channel 13) in Seattle, which all would have become owned-and-operated stations of the network; however, Tribune terminated the deal in August 2018.

On June 24, 2014, Fox announced that it would trade WFXT and WHBQ to the Cox Media Group, in exchange for the San Francisco duopoly of Fox affiliate KTVU (channel 2) and independent station KICU-TV (channel 36), which Fox had sought to acquire for several years (in this instance, it was part of an attempt by the network to acquire O&Os in additional markets where a franchise in the National Football Conference, from which most of Fox's NFL game telecasts come, is based). The trade was completed on October 8, 2014.

In December 2018, Nexstar Media Group announced its acquisition of Tribune. As was the case with Sinclair's failed acquisition of the company, Fox sought to buy certain Fox-affiliated stations owned by Tribune, with KDVR, KCPQ, and WJW emerging as potential candidates. However, in March 2019, Nexstar announced that KSTU and WSFL-TV would be acquired by the E.W. Scripps Company; Nexstar intended to retain KSWB, KTXL, WJW, KCPQ, and KDVR after the transaction is completed. Two months after the close of the Nexstar deal, Fox Television Stations and Nexstar announced a swap, where Fox would acquire KCPQ and KZJO in Seattle, along with a re-acquisition of WITI in Milwaukee, with Nexstar acquiring Fox's Charlotte, North Carolina duopoly of WJZY and WMYT-TV.

=== The WB ===
From January 1995 to September 2006, Time Warner and Tribune Broadcasting jointly owned The WB Television Network. Tribune initially held a 12.5% ownership interest in the network at its launch, a stake that it later increased to 22%. As a result of its partnership, in November 1993 (fourteen months before the network debuted), Tribune agreed to a deal to affiliate most of its independent stations with The WB. Despite Tribune's minority stake, the company's stations were not considered to be WB owned-and-operated-stations due to Time Warner's controlling interest in the network. This resulted in The WB having the unusual distinction of being the only broadcast network that did not have O&Os in New York City, Los Angeles and Chicago throughout its existence (the three Tribune-owned WB affiliates in those cities – WPIX, KTLA and WGN-TV, respectively – were affiliates of the network as a result).

However, Tribune was the only one of the two companies involved in The WB that owned any stations aligned with the network as Time Warner did not own any television stations at the network's launch and would not own one until its 1996 merger with the Turner Broadcasting System, owners of Atlanta superstation WTBS (channel 17, now WPCH-TV; its national feed, TBS, is now a separate basic cable channel). On January 24, 2006, Time Warner and CBS Corporation announced that they would merge The WB with the CBS-owned United Paramount Network to form a new broadcast network called The CW. All except three of Tribune's 19 WB stations joined The CW when it launched on September 18, 2006, through ten-year affiliation agreements (although two – KSWB-TV (channel 69, now a Fox affiliate) in San Diego and WTTV (channel 4, now a CBS affiliate) in Indianapolis – have since disaffiliated from the network under Tribune ownership, while another – WLVI (channel 56) in Boston, which remains with The CW – was sold by Tribune to Sunbeam Television in September 2006). Tribune, however, does not have an ownership interest in The CW, having opted to forego a stake in the network in order to avoid having to finance shutdown costs for The WB.

ACME Communications, which operated WB-affiliated stations in small and mid-sized markets, was owned by Jamie Kellner, the network's president from its 1995 launch until 2001. However, neither Time Warner or Tribune considered the ACME stations on the same level as the Tribune stations, nor did Time Warner have any interest in the stations outside of traditional affiliation agreements, or vice versa did ACME have any interest in Time Warner. Despite this, the ACME stations were among the first awarded de facto affiliation agreements for The CW when the network began to open up affiliation negotiations in March 2006, as many of its stations were among the top affiliates of The WB by viewership.

=== UPN ===
UPN stations that were formerly owned by Chris-Craft Industries and those that were owned by CBS Corporation at the end of the network's run were sometimes considered owned-and-operated stations of the network, and several transactions have involved these stations. Not too long after becoming a UPN owned-and-operated station itself, San Antonio station KRRT (channel 35, now KMYS) was sold to Jet Broadcasting in 1995, eventually becoming an affiliate of The WB (the station is now a Dabl affiliate that is operated by former owner Sinclair Broadcast Group, and owned by Sinclair partner company Deerfield Media).

On August 12, 2000, Chris-Craft sold its UPN stations to the Fox Television Stations subsidiary of News Corporation for $5.5 billion – these stations had been stripped of their status as UPN owned-and-operated stations earlier that year due to Viacom's buyout of Chris-Craft's stake in the network, but remained with UPN as affiliates. Of those stations, San Francisco's KBHK (channel 44, now KPYX) was traded to the Paramount Stations Group, while Portland's KPTV (channel 12) was traded to the Meredith Corporation. Both KPTV and former Minneapolis-St. Paul sister station KMSP-TV (channel 9) traded their UPN affiliations with Fox affiliates in those markets that they respectively became co-owned with, WFTC (channel 29) and KPDX (channel 49). Fox had acquired WFTC from Clear Channel Communications not long after the Chris-Craft purchase was finalized, while Meredith already owned KPDX at the time it purchased KPTV. The other UPN stations that remained under Fox ownership retained their affiliations with that network, but were no longer O&Os – giving UPN the distinction of being one of only two broadcast networks whose stations in the three largest markets of New York, Los Angeles and Chicago were not owned-and-operated stations (along with The WB); WWOR-TV (channel 9) in Secaucus, New Jersey (part of the New York City market) and KCOP-TV (channel 13) in Los Angeles were de facto O&Os prior to Viacom's buyout of Chris-Craft's stake in UPN, while WPWR-TV (channel 50) in Chicago was an affiliate of UPN throughout the network's run (and would not be co-owned with the two other larger-market stations until after Fox purchased it from Newsweb Corporation in 2002).

In September 2006, these stations became O&Os of MyNetworkTV, which was created in response to The CW's decision to affiliate stations owned by Tribune Broadcasting and network part-owner CBS Corporation's CBS Television Stations subsidiary with the network instead of Fox's UPN-affiliated stations. In fact, two of the former Chris-Craft stations have the distinction of being owned-and-operated stations of two networks: WWOR-TV (the second in the New York City market after sister station WNYW, which has been an O&O of DuMont and Fox), and KCOP-TV (the first and only station in the Los Angeles market), both having been O&Os of UPN and MyNetworkTV.

Viacom/CBS sold off several UPN owned-and-operated stations during the network's final five years. Mercury Broadcasting bought Wichita, Kansas' KSCC (channel 36, now KMTW) in 2001 (the station is now owned by Deerfield Media under a local marketing agreement with Sinclair Broadcast Group); KTXH (channel 20) in Houston and WDCA (channel 20) in Washington, D.C. were sold to Fox Television Stations that same year (as part of the aforementioned swap with KBHK, both are now owned-and-operated stations of MyNetworkTV). In 2005, WNDY-TV (channel 23) in Indianapolis and WWHO (channel 53) in Columbus were sold to LIN TV; in 2006, KAUT-TV (channel 43) in Oklahoma City was sold to The New York Times Company (which later sold its entire television group to Local TV, which in turn was subsequently acquired by Tribune Broadcasting), and in 2008, WUPL (channel 54) in New Orleans was sold to Belo (which subsequently merged with the Gannett Company).

=== The CW ===
Because of CBS Corporation's and later Paramount Global/Skydance's ownership stake in The CW Television Network, while not a traditional O&O arrangement, stations owned by the company that carry programming from the network were previously considered O&Os. In February 2007, as part of the aforementioned group deal that included two of CBS's O&Os, CBS Corporation sold its CW owned-and-operated stations in West Palm Beach, Florida (WTVX, channel 34) and Providence (WLWC, channel 28) to Four Points Media Group. The Four Points stations were subsequently acquired by the Sinclair Broadcast Group; WLWC, in turn, has since been spun off to OTA Broadcasting, LLC.

In June 2010, CBS announced the sale of its Norfolk, Virginia CW O&O WGNT (channel 27) to Local TV, then owner of that market's CBS affiliate WTKR-TV (channel 3) (as well as seven former Fox O&O stations). This created the second television duopoly in that market (the first involved LIN TV-owned NBC affiliate WAVY-TV (channel 10) and Fox affiliate WVBT (channel 43)). As part of the deal, Local TV would take over the operations of WGNT through a time brokerage agreement while the deal awaited FCC approval. Until the sale closed on August 4, WGNT was the smallest station by market size to be owned by CBS following the Four Points Media Group deal. The sale of WGNT also made WJZ-TV (channel 13) in Baltimore the smallest station by market size that is still owned by CBS (WGNT, along with WTKR, is now owned by The E. W. Scripps Company).

In October 2022, Nexstar Media Group purchased a majority stake in The CW from Paramount Global and Warner Bros. Discovery. Nexstar had previously acquired Tribune Media, and with it CW affiliates in major markets such as Los Angeles, Dallas, and Washington, D.C. As such, those stations and other existing Nexstar-owned CW affiliates effectively became CW O&Os. This included several stations that run the network on a digital subchannel, including those receiving programming from small-market feed The CW Plus, but not stations owned by other entities such as Mission Broadcasting, which bought WPIX in New York City after buying it from the E. W. Scripps Company (Nexstar had divested the station to Scripps as part of the Tribune deal due to FCC ownership regulations), which Nexstar provides services to through local marketing agreements.

As part of Nexstar's deal to acquire majority ownership of The CW, Paramount Global was given the right to convert its eight CW-affiliated stations into independents; on September 1, 2023, Paramount Global exercised this right. In three of these markets (Philadelphia, San Francisco, and Tampa), a Nexstar-owned station took over the CW affiliation.

=== Other networks ===
In 1999, not long after Ion Television launched as Pax TV, its parent company Paxson Communications (now Ion Media Networks) sold its Dayton, Green Bay and Decatur O&Os – WDPX (channel 26), WPXG (channel 14) and WPXU (channel 23), respectively – to ACME Communications; the stations later changed their respective callsigns to WBDT, WCWF and WBUI. All three stations then became primary affiliates of The WB (though they retained secondary affiliations with Pax until 2005); the stations are now CW affiliates (WBDT and WCWF were sold to LIN TV, while WBUI was sold to GOCOM Media).

Two years later, in 2001, Pax sold its Little Rock owned-and-operated station KYPX (channel 42) to Equity Broadcasting, which switched the station's affiliation to The WB as KWBF (that station is now MyNetworkTV affiliate KARZ-TV, owned by the Nexstar Media Group). In 2003, Pax sold its Albuquerque, New Mexico O&O, KAPX (channel 14, now KTFQ-TV), to Univision Communications, which turned it into an O&O of TeleFutura. That same year, Paxson sold KPXJ (channel 21) in Shreveport, Louisiana, to KTBS, Inc. (owner of the station's ABC-affiliated sister station KTBS-TV); that station became a UPN affiliate and is also now an affiliate of The CW.

=== Multiple networks ===
Philadelphia's WCAU-TV had been a CBS owned-and-operated station starting in 1958. However, after CBS announced its alliance with Westinghouse Broadcasting in 1995, the network chose to affiliate with Westinghouse's KYW-TV, Philadelphia's longtime NBC affiliate. After a bidding war, WCAU was sold to NBC. KYW became a CBS owned-and-operated station after Westinghouse's merger with CBS a few months later.

As part of the same deal, NBC in turn transferred its own O&O stations in Denver (KCNC-TV, channel 4) and Salt Lake City (KUTV) to Westinghouse/CBS, and those stations became CBS O&Os after Westinghouse merged with CBS. NBC and CBS also swapped transmitting facilities in Miami between the then-weaker CBS-owned WCIX (channel 6, now WFOR-TV, channel 4) and the then-stronger NBC-owned WTVJ (channel 4, now on the weaker channel 6 signal under the same calls).

=== Stations that have been O&Os of more than one major network ===
This includes future O&Os, and also counts stations aligned with UPN, The WB and The CW.

Station	Networks station served as an O&O
DuMont and CBS	KDKA-TV 2/Pittsburgh
DuMont and Fox	WNYW 5/New York City
DuMont and Fox	WTTG 5/Washington, D.C.
Fox and MyNetworkTV	WFTC 29/Minneapolis/St. Paul
Fox and the CW	KDAF 33/Dallas/Fort Worth
NBC and CBS	KCNC-TV 4/Denver
NBC and CBS	KUTV 2/Salt Lake City
NBC and CBS	KYW-TV 3/Philadelphia
CBS and NBC	WCAU-TV 10/Philadelphia
UPN and Fox	KMSP-TV 9/Minneapolis-St. Paul
UPN and MyNetworkTV	KCOP-TV 13/Los Angeles
UPN and MyNetworkTV	KTXH 20/Houston
UPN and MyNetworkTV	KUTP 45/Phoenix
UPN and MyNetworkTV	WDCA 20/Washington, D.C.
UPN and MyNetworkTV	WPWR-TV 50/Gary-Chicago
UPN and MyNetworkTV	WRBW 65/Orlando
UPN and MyNetworkTV	WUTB 24/Baltimore
UPN and MyNetworkTV	WWOR-TV 9/Secaucus-New York City
UPN, the CW and CBS	WUPA 69/Atlanta

== O&O stations of U.S. broadcast television networks ==
=== ABC ===
==== Current owned-and-operated stations ====
City of license/Market	Station	Owned since
Chicago, Illinois	WLS-TV 7	1948
Durham - Raleigh - Fayetteville, North Carolina	WTVD 11	1986
Fresno, California	KFSN-TV 30	1986
Houston, Texas	KTRK-TV 13	1986
Los Angeles, California	KABC-TV 7	1949
New York City, New York	WABC-TV 7	1948
Philadelphia, Pennsylvania	WPVI-TV 6	1986
San Francisco - Oakland - San Jose, California	KGO-TV 7	1949

==== Former owned-and-operated stations ====
Market	Station	Years owned	Current ownership status
Detroit, Michigan	WXYZ-TV 7	1948–1986	ABC affiliate owned by E. W. Scripps Company
Flint - Bay City - Saginaw, Michigan	WJRT-TV 12	1995–2011	ABC affiliate owned by Allen Media Broadcasting
Toledo, Ohio	WTVG 13	1995–2011	ABC affiliate owned by Gray Television

=== CBS ===
==== Current owned-and-operated stations ====
City of license/Market	Station	Owned since
Atlanta, Georgia	WUPA 69	1994
Baltimore, Maryland	WJZ-TV 13	1995
Boston, Massachusetts	WBZ-TV 4	1995
Chicago, Illinois	WBBM-TV 2	1953
Denver, Colorado	KCNC-TV 4	1995
Detroit, Michigan	WWJ-TV 62	1995
Fort Worth - Dallas, Texas	KTVT 11	1999
Los Angeles, California	KCBS-TV 2	1951
Miami - Fort Lauderdale, Florida	WFOR-TV 4	1989
Minneapolis - St. Paul	WCCO-TV 4	1992
New York City, New York	WCBS-TV 2	1941
Philadelphia, Pennsylvania	KYW-TV 3	1995
Pittsburgh, Pennsylvania	KDKA-TV 2	1995
San Francisco - Oakland - San Jose, California	KPIX-TV 5	1995
Stockton - Sacramento - Modesto, California	KOVR 13	2005

==== Independent Television Stations owned by CBS News and Stations ====
City of license/Market	Station	Owned since
Boston, Massachusetts	WSBK-TV 38	2000
Dallas - Fort Worth, Texas	KTXA 21	2000
Jeannette - Pittsburgh, Pennsylvania	WPKD-TV 19	2000
Los Angeles, California	KCAL-TV 9	2002
Philadelphia, Pennsylvania	WPSG 57	2000
Riverhead, New York	WLNY-TV 55	2012
Sacramento - Stockton - Modesto, California	KMAX-TV 31	2000
San Francisco - Oakland - San Jose, California	KPYX 44	2002
St. Petersburg -Tampa, Florida	WTOG 44	2000
Tacoma - Seattle, Washington	KSTW 11	2000

==== Former owned-and-operated stations ====
City of license/Market	Station	Years owned	Current ownership status
Austin, Texas	KEYE-TV 42	1999–2007	CBS affiliate owned by Sinclair Broadcast Group
Green Bay, Wisconsin	WFRV-TV 5	1991–2007	CBS affiliate owned by Nexstar Media Group
Hartford, Connecticut	WHCT 18	1955–1959	Univision affiliate, WUVN, owned by Entravision Communications
Los Angeles, California	KTTV 11 (Note: Station was co-owned by CBS in a joint venture with the Los Angeles Times.)	1949–1950	Fox O&O owned by Fox Television Stations
Escanaba - Marquette, Michigan	WJMN-TV 3 (satellite of WFRV)	1991–2007	ABC affiliate owned by Sullivan's Landing, LLC (Operated through a JSA/SSA by Morgan Murphy Media)
Milwaukee, Wisconsin	WXIX 19/18	1955–1959	CW affiliate, WVTV, owned by Rincon Broadcasting
Philadelphia, Pennsylvania	WCAU-TV 10	1958–1995	NBC O&O owned by NBCUniversal
Providence, Rhode Island	WPRI-TV 12	1995–1996	CBS affiliate owned by Nexstar Media Group
Salt Lake City, Utah	KUTV 2	1995–2007	CBS affiliate owned by Sinclair Broadcast Group
St. Louis, Missouri	KMOX-TV 4	1958–1986	CBS affiliate, KMOV, owned by Gray Television
Alexandria, Minnesota	KCCO-TV 7 (satellite of WCCO-TV)	1992–2017	Original license turned in after 2016 spectrum auction. Channel re-allocated to KONC, owned by Tri-State Christian Television
Washington, D.C.	WTOP-TV 9 (Note: Station was co-owned by CBS in a joint venture with The Washington Post.)	1950–1954	CBS affiliate, WUSA-TV, owned by Tegna, Inc.

=== Christian Television Network ===
==== Current owned-and-operated stations ====
City of license/Market	Station
Charleston, South Carolina	WLCN-CD 18
Cheyenne, Wyoming	KQCK 33
Clearwater–Tampa–St. Petersburg, Florida	WCLF 22 (flagship station)
Cleveland–Chattanooga, Tennessee	WTNB-CD 27
Colorado Springs, Colorado	KWHS-LD 51
Columbus, Georgia–Phenix City, Alabama	WYBU-CD 16
Decatur, Illinois	WLCF-LD 45
Denver, Colorado	KQDK-CD 39
Dubuque–Cedar Rapids–Waterloo–Iowa City, Iowa	KFXB-TV 40
Houston, Texas	KHLM-LD 12
Inglis–Yankeetown–Lecanto, Florida	WYKE-CD 47 (translator of WCLF)
Isabel Segunda–Vieques, Puerto Rico	WVQS-LD 50 (translator of WSJN-CD)
Jefferson City–Columbia, Missouri	KFDR 25
Las Vegas, Nevada	KEEN-CD 17
Macon, Georgia	WGNM 45
Murfreesboro–Nashville, Tennessee	WHTN 39
New Orleans, Louisiana	WHNO 20
Palm Beach–West Palm Beach, Florida	WFGC 61
Pensacola, Florida–Mobile, Alabama	WHBR 33
Ponce, Puerto Rico	WUSP-LD 25
Quebradillas, Puerto Rico	WQSJ-CD 20 (satellite of WSJN-CD)
Quincy, Illinois–Hannibal, Missouri–Keokuk, Iowa	WTJR 16
San Juan, Puerto Rico	WSJN-CD 20
Tallahassee, Florida–Thomasville, Georgia	WVUP-CD 45
Tazewell–Knoxville, Tennessee	WVLR 48
Tice–Fort Myers–Naples, Florida	WRXY-TV 49
Toa Baja, Puerto Rico	WELU 34
Tulsa, Oklahoma	KWHB 47
Tupelo–Columbus, Mississippi	WEPH 49

==== Former owned-and-operated stations ====
City of license/Market	Station	Current ownership status
Cocoa–Orlando, Florida	WTGL-TV 52	WHLV-TV, TBN O&O affiliate owned by Trinity Broadcasting Network
Columbus, Georgia	WSWS 66	WGBP-TV, Merit TV affiliate owned by CNZ Communications, LLC
Fort Lauderdale–Miami–West Palm Beach, Florida	WKID-TV 51	WSCV, Telemundo O&O affiliate owned by Telemundo Station Group
Lexington–Winston-Salem–Greensboro–High Point, North Carolina	WEJC 20	WCWG, CW affiliate owned by Hearst Television
Melbourne–Orlando, Florida	WIRB 56	WOPX-TV, Ion Television O&O affiliate owned by Ion Media

=== The CW ===
==== Current owned-and-operated stations ====
City of license/Market	Station	Owned since
Akron - Cleveland, Ohio	WBNX-TV 55	2025
Albuquerque–Santa Fe, New Mexico	KWBQ 19	2022
Ames–Des Moines, Iowa	KCWI-TV 23	2026
Augusta, Georgia	WJBF 6.3	2024
Austin, Texas	KNVA 54	2024
Bakersfield, California	KGET-TV 17.2	2022
Baton Rouge, Louisiana	WGMB-TV 44.2 WBRL-CD 21	2022
Battle Creek–Kalamazoo–Grand Rapids, Michigan	WOTV 41.2	2024
Billings, Montana	KSVI 6.2	2023
Buffalo, New York	WNLO 23	2022
Charleston, South Carolina	WCBD-TV 2.2	2022
Chicago, Illinois	WGN-TV 9.1	2024
Colorado Springs–Pueblo, Colorado	KXTU-LD 57	2022
Dallas–Fort Worth, Texas	KDAF 33	2022
Davenport–Burlington, Iowa - Rock Island, Illinois	KGCW 26	2022
Dayton–Springfield, Ohio	WBDT 26	2024
Denver, Colorado	KWGN-TV 2	2022
Dickinson - Bismarck - Minot - Williston, North Dakota	KXMA-TV 2.1 KXMB-TV 12.2 KXMC-TV 13.2 KXMD-TV 11.2	2022
Elmira - Corning, New York	WETM-TV 18.2	2025
Erie, Pennsylvania	WJET-TV 24.2	2025
Evansville, Indiana - Henderson - Owensboro, Kentucky	WTVW 7	2022
Greenville–New Bern–Washington–Jacksonville, North Carolina	WNCT-TV 9.2	2022
Greenville–Spartanburg–Anderson, South Carolina - Asheville, North Carolina	WYCW 62	2022
Honolulu, Hawaii - Hilo, Hawaii - Wailuku, Hawaii	KHON-TV 2.2 KHAW-TV 11.2 KAII-TV 7.2	2022
Houston, Texas	KIAH 39	2022
Huntsville–Decatur, Alabama	WHDF 15	2022
Jackson, Mississippi - Hattiesburg–Laurel, Mississippi	WJTV 12.2 WHLT 22.2	2022
Lafayette, Louisiana	KLFY-TV 10.2	2024
Lansing–Jackson, Michigan	WLAJ 53.2	2022
Little Rock–Pine Bluff, Arkansas	KASN 38	2022
Los Angeles, California	KTLA 5	2022
Macon, Georgia	WMAZ-TV 13.2	2026
Memphis, Tennessee	WLMT 30	2026
Mobile, Alabama - Pensacola, Florida	WFNA 55	2022
Nacogdoches–Lufkin–Tyler–Longview–Jacksonville, Texas	KYTX 19.2	2026
New Orleans, Louisiana	WNOL-TV 38	2022
New York City, New York	WPIX-TV 11	2022
Oklahoma City, Oklahoma	KAUT-TV 43	2023
Panama City, Florida	WMBB 13.2	2024
Philadelphia, Pennsylvania	WPHL-TV 17	2023
Portland–Salem, Oregon	KRCW-TV 32	2022
Prescott–Phoenix, Arizona	KAZT-TV 7	2024
Providence, Rhode Island - New Bedford, Massachusetts	WNAC-TV 64.2	2022
Rock Hill, South Carolina - Charlotte, North Carolina	WMYT-TV 55	2025
Roanoke–Lynchburg, Virginia	WWCW 21	2022
Salt Lake City, Utah	KUCW 30	2022
San Diego, California	KUSI-TV 51	2026
San Francisco–Oakland–San Jose, California	KRON-TV 4	2023
Savannah, Georgia - Hilton Head Island, South Carolina	WSAV-TV 3.2	2022
Sioux Falls, South Dakota - Rapid City, South Dakota	KELO-TV 11.4 KCLO-TV 15.2	2022
Springfield, Massachusetts	WWLP 22.2 WFXQ-CD 28.2	2022
St. Louis, Missouri	KPLR-TV 11	2022
St. Petersburg–Tampa, Florida	WTTA 38	2023
Spokane, Washington - Coeur d'Alene, Idaho	KSKN 22	2026
Terre Haute, Indiana	WTWO 2.2	2024
Topeka, Kansas	KTKA-TV 49.3	2024
Tucson, Arizona	KTTU-TV 18	2026
Utica–Rome, New York	WFXV 33.2	2024
Virginia Beach–Norfolk–Hampton, Virginia	WVBT 43.2	2024
Washington, D.C. - Hagerstown, Maryland	WDCW 50	2022
Waterbury–Hartford–New Haven, Connecticut	WCCT-TV 20	2026
Watertown, New York	WWTI 50.2	2022
West Monroe–Monroe, Louisiana - El Dorado, Arkansas	KARD-TV 14.2	2024
Wichita Falls, Texas - Lawton, Oklahoma	KFDX-TV 3.3	2024

==== Former owned-and-operated stations ====
City of license/Market	Station	Years owned	Current ownership status
Atlanta, Georgia	WUPA 69	2006-2022	CBS O&O station owned by CBS News and Stations
Norfolk, Virginia - Hampton Roads	WGNT 27	2006–2010	Independent station owned by E. W. Scripps Company
Philadelphia, Pennsylvania	WPSG 57	2006–2022	Independent station owned by CBS News and Stations
Jeannette - Pittsburgh, Pennsylvania	WPCW 19	2006–2022	Independent station, WPKD-TV owned by CBS News and Stations
Providence, Rhode Island	WLWC 28	2006–2007	Court TV affiliate owned by Inyo Broadcast Holdings (CW programming rights transferred to WNAC-DT2 in 2016 spectrum auction)
Sacramento - Stockton - Modesto, California	KMAX-TV 31	2006–2022	Independent station owned by CBS News and Stations
San Francisco - Oakland - San Jose, California	KBCW 44	2006–2022	Independent station, KPYX owned by CBS News and Stations
Seattle - Tacoma, Washington	KSTW 11	2006–2022	Independent station owned by CBS News and Stations
Tampa - St. Petersburg - Sarasota, Florida	WTOG 44	2006–2022	Independent station owned by CBS News and Stations
West Palm Beach, Florida	WTVX 34	2006–2007	CW affiliate owned by Sinclair Broadcast Group

=== Estrella TV ===
==== Current owned-and-operated stations ====
City of license/Market	Station	Owned since
Chicago, Illinois	WESV-LD 40	2010
Denver, Colorado	KETD 53	2010
Houston, Texas	KZJL 61	2009
Key West - Miami - Fort Lauderdale, Florida	WGEN-TV 8	2018
Los Angeles, California	KRCA 62	2009
Port Jervis - Newton, New Jersey - New York City, New York	WASA-LD 24	2012
Port Jervis - Newton, New Jersey - New York City, New York	WMBC-TV 63	2026

==== Former owned-and-operated station ====
City of Licence/Market	Station	Years Owned	Current ownership status
Dallas - Fort Worth, Texas	KMPX 29	2009–2020	Independent station, KFAA-TV owned by Tegna, Inc. (Estrella remains on DT2)
Phoenix, Arizona	KVPA-LD 42	2009–2023	Binge TV owned by Bridge Media Networks
Salt Lake City, Utah	KPNZ 24	2009–2018	TCT owned by Tri-State Christian Television
San Diego, California	KSDX-LD 29	2009–2023	Binge TV owned by Bridge Media Networks

=== Fox ===
==== Current owned-and-operated stations ====
City of license/Market	Station	Owned since
Atlanta, Georgia	WAGA-TV 5	1997
Austin, Texas	KTBC 7	1997
Chicago, Illinois	WFLD 32	1986
Dallas - Fort Worth, Texas	KDFW-TV 4	1997
Detroit, Michigan	WJBK 2	1997
Houston, Texas	KRIV 26	1986
Los Angeles, California	KTTV 11	1986
Milwaukee, Wisconsin	WITI 6	1997–2008; 2020
Minneapolis - Saint Paul, Minnesota	KMSP-TV 9	2001
New York City, New York	WNYW 5	1986
Ocala-Gainesville, Florida	WOGX 51 (semi-satellite of WOFL, Orlando, FL)	2002
Oakland - San Francisco - San Jose, California	KTVU 2	2014
Orlando - Daytona Beach - Melbourne, Florida	WOFL 35	2002
Philadelphia, Pennsylvania	WTXF-TV 29	1995
Phoenix, Arizona	KSAZ-TV 10	1997
Tacoma - Seattle, Washington	KCPQ 13	2020
Tampa - St. Petersburg - Sarasota, Florida	WTVT 13	1997
Washington, D.C.	WTTG 5	1986

==== Former owned-and-operated stations ====
City of license/Market	Station	Years owned	Current ownership status
Atlanta, Georgia	WATL 36	1993–1994	MyNetworkTV affiliate owned by Tegna, Inc.
Belmont - Charlotte, North Carolina	WJZY 46	2013–2020	Fox affiliate owned by Nexstar Media Group
Birmingham, Alabama	WBRC 6	1996–2008	Fox affiliate owned by Gray Television
Boston, Massachusetts	WFXT 25	1987–1991; 1995–2014	Fox affiliate owned by Cox Media Group
Cleveland, Ohio	WJW 8	1997–2008	Fox affiliate owned by Nexstar Media Group
Dallas - Fort Worth, Texas	KDAF 33	1986–1995	CW O&O owned by Nexstar Media Group
Denver, Colorado	KDVR 31	1995–2008	Fox affiliate owned by Nexstar Media Group
Greensboro - High Point - Winston-Salem, North Carolina	WGHP 8	1996–2008	Fox affiliate owned by Nexstar Media Group
Kansas City, Missouri	WDAF-TV 4	1997–2008	Fox affiliate owned by Nexstar Media Group
Memphis, Tennessee	WHBQ-TV 13	1995–2014	Fox affiliate owned by Rincon Broadcasting Group
Minneapolis - St. Paul, Minnesota	WFTC 29	2001–2002	Merged into duopoly with, and affiliation transferred to, KMSP; MyNetworkTV O&O owned by Fox Television Stations
Portland, Oregon	KPTV 12	2001–2002	Fox affiliate owned by Gray Television
Salt Lake City, Utah	KSTU 13	1990–2008	Fox affiliate owned by E. W. Scripps Company
St. Louis, Missouri	KTVI 2	1997–2008	Fox affiliate owned by Nexstar Media Group

=== Heartland ===
The following low-powered television stations are stations that are owned-and-operated by Get After It Media. These stations contain subchannels in this following order:

Subchannel	Network
xx.1	Heartland (formerly The Nashville Network)
xx.2	Retro TV
xx.3	Rev'n
xx.4	Action Channel
xx.5	The Family Channel

==== Current owned-and-operated stations ====
City of license/Market	Station
Baton Rouge, Louisiana	WRUG-LD 50
Birmingham, Alabama	WSWH-LD 22
Buffalo, New York	WBUO-LD 30
Charleston, South Carolina	WLOW-LD 19
Chattanooga, Tennessee	WOOT-LD 6 (flagship station)
Chico – Redding, California	KXCH-LD 19
Columbus, Georgia	WXVK-LD 30
Denver, Colorado	KAVC-LD 21
Fargo–Valley City, North Dakota	KFGX-LD 35
Huntsville, Alabama	WNAL-LD 27
Idaho Falls – Pocatello, Idaho	KPTO-LD 41
Indianapolis, Indiana	WSWY-LD 21
Jacksonville, Florida	WJVF-LD 23
Knoxville, Tennessee	WKXT-LD 61
Las Vegas, Nevada	KVGA-LD 51
Minneapolis – St. Paul, Minnesota	KKTW-LD 19
Oklahoma City, Oklahoma	KWRW-LD 33
Peoria – Bloomington, Illinois	WSIO-LD 51
Raleigh – Durham, North Carolina	WDRH-LD 16
Rapid City, South Dakota	KRPC-LP 33
San Antonio, Texas	KRTX-LD 20
Savannah, Georgia	WSVG-LD 23
Scranton – Wilkes-Barre, Pennsylvania	WSRG-LD 59
Shreveport, Louisiana	KVPO-LD 30
Sioux Falls, South Dakota	KSXF-LD 56
Spartanburg – Greenville – Anderson, South Carolina – Asheville, North Carolina	WASV-LD 50 WNGS-LD 50
Springfield, Missouri	KSFZ-LD 41
Tampa, Florida	WDNP-LD 36
Tulsa, Oklahoma	KTUO-LD 22
Wichita, Kansas	KSMI-LD 30
Zanesville, Ohio	WOOH-LD 29

=== Ion Television ===
This is a list of stations that are owned and operated by Ion Media. This includes networks owned by E. W. Scripps Company such as Grit or Bounce TV.

Note: Some stations were owned by Ion Media Networks under its former name Paxson Communications prior to the 1998 launch of Ion Television as Pax TV.

==== Current owned-and-operated stations ====
City of license/Market	Station	Owned since	Notes
Antigo - Wausau - Rhinelander, Wisconsin	WTPX-TV 46	2001	
Arlington - Dallas - Fort Worth, Texas	KPXD-TV 68	1998	
Bellevue - Seattle - Tacoma, Washington	KWPX-TV 33	1998	
Boston, Massachusetts Woburn, Massachusetts	WBPX-TV 68	1999	
Boston, Massachusetts Woburn, Massachusetts	WDPX-TV 58	1999	Primary channel is affiliated with Grit.
Bradenton - Tampa - Saint Petersburg, Florida	WXPX-TV 66.2	1998	Primary channel is an independent.
Brunswick, Georgia - Jacksonville, Florida	WPXC-TV 21	2000	
Cedar Rapids - Waterloo - Iowa City - Dubuque, Iowa	KPXR-TV 48	1998	
Charleston - Huntington, West Virginia	WLPX-TV 29	1998	
Chicago, Illinois	WCPX-TV 38	1998	
Columbia, South Carolina	WZRB 47 (Note: WZRB carried a secondary affiliation with The CW from February to March 2014, shortly after becoming an Ion O&O.)	2014	
Concord - Manchester, New Hampshire	WPXG-TV 21 (satellite of WBPX-TV, Boston, MA)	1999	
Conroe - Houston, Texas	KPXB-TV 49	1998	
East St. Louis, Illinois - St. Louis, Missouri	WRBU 46	2014	
Greenville - New Bern - Washington, North Carolina	WEPX-TV 38	1998	
Jacksonville, North Carolina	WPXU-TV 35 (satellite of WEPX-TV, Greenville, NC)	1999	
Jellico - Knoxville, Tennessee	WPXK-TV 54	1998	
Kenosha - Milwaukee, Wisconsin	WPXE-TV 55	1998	
Laughlin - Las Vegas, Nevada	KMCC 34.2	2021	Primary channel is an independent.
Lewiston - Portland, Maine	WIPL 35	2018	
London - Columbus, Ohio	WSFJ-TV 51	2018	Primary channel is affiliated with Bounce TV
Manassas, Virginia - Washington, D.C.	WPXW-TV 66	1998	
Martinsburg, West Virginia - Hagerstown, Maryland - Winchester, Virginia	WWPX-TV 60 (satellite of WPXW-TV, Manassas, VA)	1998	
Melbourne - Orlando - Daytona Beach, Florida	WOPX-TV 56	1998	
Miami - Fort Lauderdale, Florida	WPXM-TV 35	1998	
New Orleans, Louisiana	WPXL-TV 49	1998	
Newport - Providence, Rhode Island - New Bedford, Massachusetts	WPXQ-TV 69	1998	
New York City, New York	WPXN-TV 31	1998	
Newton - Des Moines - Ames, Iowa	KFPX-TV 39	1998	
Okmulgee - Tulsa, Oklahoma	KTPX-TV 44	1998	
Pittsburgh, Pennsylvania	WINP-TV 16	2011	
Portland - Salem, Oregon	KPXG-TV 22	1998	
Provo - Salt Lake City, Utah	KUPX-TV 16.4	1998	Primary channel is an independent.
Provo - Salt Lake City, Utah	KSTU 13.2	2017	Primary channel is Fox.
Richmond, Indiana - Dayton, Ohio	WKOI-TV 43	2018	
Roanoke, Virginia	WPXR-TV 38	1998	
Rocky Mount - Raleigh - Durham, North Carolina Archer Lodge, North Carolina	WRPX-TV 47	1998	
Rocky Mount - Raleigh - Durham, North Carolina Archer Lodge, North Carolina	WFPX-TV 62	1998	Primary channel is affiliated with Bounce TV
Rome - Atlanta, Georgia	WPXA-TV 14	1998	
Sacramento - Stockton - Modesto, California	KSPX-TV 29	1998	
Saint Cloud - Minneapolis - Saint Paul, Minnesota	KPXM-TV 41	1998	
San Bernardino - Los Angeles, California Inglewood, California	KPXN-TV 30	1998	
San Bernardino - Los Angeles, California Inglewood, California	KILM 64	2018	Primary channel is affiliated with Bounce TV
San Jose - San Francisco - Oakland, California	KKPX-TV 65	1998	
Syracuse, New York	WSPX-TV 56	1998	
Uvalde - San Antonio, Texas	KPXL-TV 26	1999	
Wilkes-Barre - Scranton, Pennsylvania	WQPX-TV 64	1998	
Wilmington, Delaware - Philadelphia, Pennsylvania	WPPX-TV 61	1998	

==== Ion stations as a subchannel owned by the E. W. Scripps Company ====
City of license/Market	Station	Owned since
Bakersfield, California	KERO-TV 23.4	2011
Baltimore, Maryland	WMAR-TV 2.5	1994
Bozeman, Montana	KBZK 7.4 (satellite of KXLF-TV)	2019
Bryan - College Station, Texas	KRHD-CD 15.3 (semi-satellite of KXXV)	2019
Butte, Montana	KXLF 4.4	2019
Cape Coral - Fort Myers - Naples, Florida	WFTX-TV 36.5	2015
Corpus Christi, Texas	KRIS-TV 6.5	2019
Denver, Colorado	KSBS-CD 10.2	2020
Great Falls, Montana	KRTV 3.4	2019
Green Bay–Appleton, Wisconsin	WGBA-TV 26.4	2015
Helena, Montana	KXLH-LD 9.4 (satellite of KRTV)	2019
Kalispell, Montana	KAJJ-CD 18.4 (satellite of KPAX-TV)	2019
Missoula, Montana	KPAX-TV 8.4	2019
Nashville, Tennessee	WTVF-TV 5.2	2026
Richmond - Petersburg, Virginia	WTVR-TV 6.5	2019
San Luis Obispo - Santa Maria - Santa Barbara, California	KSBY-TV 6.6	2019
Sturgeon Bay, Wisconsin	WLWK-CD 22.4 (satellite of WGBA-TV)	2015
Tucson, Arizona	KGUN-TV 9.5	2015
Waco - Temple - Killeen, Texas	KXXV 25.4	2019
West Palm Beach, Florida	WPTV-TV 5.4	1961

==== Former owned-and-operated stations ====
Scripps would also sell 23 of Ion Media's 71 television stations to comply with national ownership caps; the buyer, revealed in an October 2020 FCC filing to be Inyo Broadcast Holdings, has promised to maintain the stations' Ion Television affiliations after the purchase.

City of license/Market	Station	Years owned	Current ownership status
Akron - Cleveland, Ohio	WVPX-TV 23	1999–2021	Ion affiliate owned by Inyo Broadcast Holdings
Albuquerque, New Mexico	KAPX 14	1999–2003	Univision affiliate, KLUZ-TV owned by TelevisaUnivision (Operated through an LMA by Entravision Communications)
Amsterdam - Albany - Schenectady - Troy, New York	WYPX-TV 55	1999–2021	Ion affiliate owned by Inyo Broadcast Holdings
Ann Arbor - Detroit, Michigan	WPXD-TV 31	1998–2021	Ion affiliate owned by Inyo Broadcast Holdings
Batavia - Buffalo - Rochester, New York	WPXJ-TV 51	1999–2021	Ion affiliate owned by Inyo Broadcast Holdings
Battle Creek - Grand Rapids - Kalamazoo - Lansing, Michigan	WZPX-TV 43	1998–2021	Ion affiliate owned by Inyo Broadcast Holdings
Bloomington - Indianapolis, Indiana	WIPX-TV 63	1998–2021	Ion affiliate owned by Inyo Broadcast Holdings
Burlington - Greensboro - High Point-Winston-Salem, North Carolina	WGPX-TV 16	1998–2021	Ion affiliate owned by Inyo Broadcast Holdings
Champaign - Springfield - Decatur, Illinois	WPXU 23	1998–1999	CW affiliate, WBUI, owned by GOCOM Media, LLC (Operated through an SSA by Sinclair Broadcast Group)
Denver, Colorado	KPXC-TV 59	1998–2021	Ion affiliate owned by Inyo Broadcast Holdings
Franklin - Nashville, Tennessee	WNPX-TV 28	1998-2026	Independent station owned by the E. W. Scripps Company. Moved their Ion affiliate to WTVF-DT2
Gadsden - Birmingham, Alabama	WPXH-TV 44	1999–2001	Ion affiliate owned by Inyo Broadcast Holdings
Kaneohe - Honolulu, Hawaii	KPXO-TV 66	1998–2021	Ion affiliate owned by Inyo Broadcast Holdings
Kansas City, Missouri	KPXE-TV 50	1998–2021	Ion affiliate owned by Inyo Broadcast Holdings
Lake Worth - West Palm Beach - Fort Pierce, Florida	WPXP-TV 67	1998–2021	Ion affiliate owned by Inyo Broadcast Holdings
Memphis, Tennessee	WPXX-TV 50 (Note: WPXX-TV carried a primary affiliation with MyNetworkTV from 2006 to 2009.)	1998–2021	Ion affiliate owned by Inyo Broadcast Holdings
Mount Vernon, Illinois - St. Louis, Missouri - Paducah, Kentucky	WPXS 13	1998–2005	Daystar owned-and-operated station
Nampa - Boise, Idaho	KTRV-TV 12	2016–2021	Ion affiliate owned by Inyo Broadcast Holdings
New London - Hartford - New Haven, Connecticut	WHPX-TV 26	1998–2021	Ion affiliate owned by Inyo Broadcast Holdings
Norfolk - Portsmouth - Newport News, Virginia	WPXV-TV 49	1998–2021	Ion affiliate owned by Inyo Broadcast Holdings
Oklahoma City, Oklahoma	KOPX-TV 62	1998–2021	Ion affiliate owned by Inyo Broadcast Holdings
Porterville - Fresno, California	KPXF 61	1998–2003	UniMás O&O, KTFF-DT, owned by Univision Communications
Morehead - Lexington, Kentucky	WUPX-TV 67	2001–2021	Ion affiliate owned by Inyo Broadcast Holdings
Minden - Shreveport, Louisiana	KPXJ 21 (Note: KPXJ carried a secondary affiliation with Ion predecessor Pax TV until 2004, after becoming a UPN affiliate.)	1998–2003	CW affiliate owned by KTBS, LLC
Spokane, Washington	KGPX-TV 34	1999–2021	Ion affiliate owned by Inyo Broadcast Holdings
Springfield - Dayton, Ohio	WDPX 26 (Note: WBDT carried a secondary affiliation with Ion predecessor Pax TV until 2004, after becoming a WB affiliate.)	1998–1999	CW affiliate, WBDT, owned by Vaughan Media (Operated through an SSA by Nexstar Media Group)
Suring - Green Bay - Appleton, Wisconsin	WPXG 14	1998–1999	CW affiliate, WCWF, owned by Sinclair Broadcast Group
Tolleson - Phoenix, Arizona	KPPX-TV 51	1999–2021	Ion affiliate owned by Inyo Broadcast Holdings
Waterville - Portland, Maine	WMPX-TV 23	1999–2003	Fox affiliate, WPFO, owned by Corporate Media Consultants Group (Operated through an SSA by Sinclair Broadcast Group)

=== MyNetworkTV ===
==== Current owned-and-operated stations ====
City of license/Market	Station	Owned since
Bemidji, Minnesota	KFTC 26 (satellite of WFTC, Minneapolis, MN)	2006
Chicago, Illinois - Gary, Indiana	WPWR-TV 50	2006
Dallas - Fort Worth, Texas	KDFI-TV 27	2006
Houston, Texas	KTXH 20	2006
Los Angeles, California	KCOP-TV 13	2006
Minneapolis - St. Paul	WFTC 29	2006
Orlando - Daytona Beach, Florida	WRBW 65	2006
Phoenix, Arizona	KUTP 45	2006
San Jose - San Francisco - Oakland, California	KICU-TV 36	2024
Secaucus, New Jersey - New York City, New York	WWOR-TV 9	2006
Tacoma - Seattle, Washington	KZJO 22	2020
Washington, D.C.	WDCA 20	2006

==== Former owned-and-operated stations ====
Market	Station	Years owned	Current ownership status
Baltimore, Maryland	WUTB 24	2006–2013	Roar affiliate owned by Deerfield Media (Operated through an SSA by Sinclair Broadcast Group)
Rock Hill, South Carolina - Charlotte, North Carolina	WMYT-TV 55	2013–2020	CW O&O (previously MyNetworkTV) affiliate owned by Nexstar Media Group

=== NBC ===
==== Current owned-and-operated stations ====
City of license/Market	Station	Owned since
Boston, Massachusetts	WBTS-CD 15 (Note: WBTS-CD is licensed to Nashua, New Hampshire, but channel shares with PBS member station WGBX-TV in Needham, Massachusetts and is effectively a full-power simulcast for the entire market.)	2018
Chicago, Illinois	WMAQ-TV 5	1948
Fort Worth - Dallas, Texas	KXAS-TV 5 (Note: This station was co-owned with LIN TV Corporation (which held 24% minority interest in both stations) from 1997 to 2013, under the limited partnership Station Venture Operations.)	1997
New Britain - Hartford-New Haven, Connecticut	WVIT 30	1956–1959, 1997–
Los Angeles, California	KNBC 4	1949
Miami-Fort Lauderdale, Florida	WTVJ 6	1989
New York City, New York	WNBC 4	1941
Philadelphia, Pennsylvania	WCAU 10	1995
San Diego, California	KNSD 39	1996
San Jose - San Francisco - Oakland, California	KNTV 11	2002
San Juan, Puerto Rico	WKAQ-TV3 2.3 (repeater of WNBC)	2014
Washington, D.C.	WRC-TV 4	1947

==== Former owned-and-operated stations ====
City of license/Market	Station	Years owned	Current ownership status
Birmingham, Alabama	WVTM-TV 13	1996–2006	NBC affiliate owned by Hearst Television
Buffalo, New York	WBUF 17	1955–1958	PBS member station, WNED-TV, owned by Western New York Public Broadcasting Association
Cleveland, Ohio	WKYC-TV 3	1947–1955; 1965–1990 (Note: NBC sold controlling interest in WKYC to Multimedia Inc. in 1990. The network retained 49% ownership of the station, but since Multimedia owned 51% interest, WKYC technically lost its status as an NBC O&O as a result of the transaction.)	NBC affiliate owned by Tegna, Inc.
Columbus, Ohio	WCMH 4	1996–2006	NBC affiliate owned by Nexstar Media Group
Denver, Colorado	KCNC-TV 4	1986–1995	CBS O&O owned by Paramount Skydance
Goldsboro - Raleigh - Durham - Fayetteville, North Carolina	WNCN 17	1996–2006	CBS affiliate owned by Nexstar Media Group
Philadelphia, Pennsylvania	KYW-TV 3	1955–1965	CBS O&O owned by Paramount Skydance
Providence, Rhode Island	WJAR-TV 10	1996–2006	NBC affiliate owned by Sinclair Broadcast Group
Salt Lake City, Utah	KUTV 2	1994–1995	CBS affiliate owned by Sinclair Broadcast Group

=== PBS ===
==== Current owned-and-operated stations ====
See: List of PBS member stations

=== Roar ===
The following are stations owned by the Sinclair Broadcast Group that has their primary channel as the digital multicast network Roar.

==== Current owned-and-operated stations ====
Stations represented with a (*) indicate a station that was a previous affiliate of the Weigel Broadcasting network, Dabl, from 2021 up until August 2025.

City of license/Market	Station	Previous affiliation (and where they moved to)
Anderson - Greenville - Spartanburg, South Carolina - Asheville, North Carolina	WMYA-TV 40*	MyNetworkTV (moved to WLOS-DT2)
Baltimore, Maryland	WUTB 24	MyNetworkTV (moved to WBFF-DT2)
Cedar Rapids - Waterloo - Iowa City - Dubuque, Iowa	KFXA 28*	Fox (moved to KGAN-DT2)
Chico - Redding, California	KCVU 20	Fox (moved to KRCR-DT2)
Columbus, Ohio	WTTE 28	Fox (moved to WSYX-DT3)
Dayton, Ohio	WRGT-TV 45*	Fox (moved to WKEF-DT2)
Elkhart - South Bend, Indiana	WSJV 28	Fox (moved to WSBT-DT2) Heroes & Icons (2016-2025)
Elko, Nevada - Salt Lake City, Utah	KENV-DT 10	NBC (now served by KSL-TV) Comet (now on KUTV-DT3)
Eureka, California	KBVU 28 (semi-satellite of KCVU)	Fox (moved to KAEF-DT2)
Florence - Myrtle Beach, South Carolina - Lumberton, North Carolina	WWMB 21*	The CW (moved to WPDE-DT2)
Greeneville - Bristol - Johnson City - Kingsport, Tennessee - Bristol, Virginia	WEMT 39	Fox (moved to WCYB-DT3)
Greenville - Washington - New Bern - Jacksonville, North Carolina	WYDO 14	Fox (moved to WCTI-DT2)
High Springs - Gainesville, Florida	WNBW-DT 9	NBC (moved to WGFL-DT3)
Hutchinson - Wichita, Kansas	KMTW 36*	MyNetworkTV (moved to KSAS-DT2)
Kerrville - San Antonio, Texas	KMYS 35*	The CW (moved to WOAI-DT2)
Mobile, Alabama - Pensacola, Florida	WPMI-TV 15	NBC (moved to WEAR-DT2)
Nashville, Tennessee	WNAB 58*	The CW (moved to WZTV-DT2)
New Bedford, Massachusetts - Providence, Rhode Island	WLNE-TV 6	ABC (moved to WJAR-DT2)
Omaha, Nebraska - Council Bluffs, Iowa	KXVO 15	The CW (moved to KPTM-DT3)
Pendleton, Oregon - Pasco - Richland - Kennewick, Washington	KFFX-TV 11	Fox (moved to KEPR-DT3)
Port Arthur - Beaumont - Orange, Texas	KBTV-TV 4*	Fox (moved to KFDM-DT3)
Reno, Nevada	KRNV-DT 4	NBC (moved to KRXI-DT2)
Saginaw - Flint - Bay City - Midland, Michigan	WEYI-TV 25	NBC (moved to WSMH-DT2)
Sioux City, Iowa	KMEG 14*	CBS (moved to KPTH-DT3)
Stuart - West Palm Beach, Florida	WWHB-CD 48	Azteca América (defunct network)
Syracuse, New York	WTVH 5	CBS (moved to WKOF)
Tulsa, Oklahoma	KOKI-TV 23	Fox (moved to KTUL-DT2)
Washington, D.C.	WIAV-CD 58	AsiaVision (former owner)
Waterville - Portland, Maine	WPFO 23	Fox (moved to WGME-DT2)
Woodstock, Virginia	WDCO-CD 10	Jewelry TV
Yakima, Washington	KCYU-LD 41 (Semi-satellite of KFFX-TV)	Fox (moved to KIMA-DT3)

=== Telemundo ===
==== Current owned-and-operated stations ====
City of license/Market	Station	Owned since
Manchester, New Hampshire - Boston, Massachusetts	WNEU 60	2002
Carlsbad, New Mexico	KTEL-CD 47 (repeater of KASA-TV)	2021
Chicago, Illinois	WSNS-TV 44 (Note: This station was jointly owned by Ensaness Communications from 1996 to 2003.)	1996
Dallas - Fort Worth, Texas	KXTX-TV 39	2001
Denver, Colorado	KDEN-TV 25	2006
Douglas, Arizona	K28EY 28 (repeater of KHRR)	N/A
El Paso, Texas	KTDO 48	2018
Fresno, California	KNSO 51 (Note: NBCUniversal holds the license to this station, although it is operated by ZGS Communications.)	2003
Galveston - Houston, Texas	KTMD 47	1997
Hartford - New Haven, Connecticut	WRDM-CD 19	1995
Las Vegas	KBLR 39	2005
Linden, New Jersey - New York City, New York	WNJU 47	1984
Los Angeles, California	KVEA 52	1985
Fort Lauderdale - Miami - West Palm Beach, Florida	WSCV 51	1987
Orlando, Florida	WTMO 31	2018
Phoenix, Arizona	KTAZ 39	2002
Philadelphia, Pennsylvania	WWSI 62	2013
Providence, Rhode Island	WYCN-LD 8	1995–2016; 2019
Rio Grande City - Harlingen - Weslaco - Brownsville - McAllen, Texas	KTLM 40	2013
Sacramento, California	KCSO-LD 33	2019
Salinas - Monterey, California	K15CU-D 15 (repeater of KNTV)	N/A
Salt Lake City, Utah	KEJT-CD 50	N/A
San Antonio, Texas	KVDA 60	1989
San Diego, California	KUAN-LD 20	2017
San Jose - San Francisco - Oakland, California	KSTS 48	1984
San Juan, Puerto Rico	WKAQ-TV 2	1987
Santa Fe - Albuquerque, New Mexico	KASA-TV 2	2021
Tampa, Florida	WRMD-CD 49	2018
Tucson, Arizona	KHRR 40	2002
Washington, D.C.	WZDC 44	2018

=== Trinity Broadcasting Network ===
Notes:

1) Stations indicated by two plus signs ("++") are stations that were signed on by TBN or a TBN subsidiary.
2) Stations indicated by two asterisks ("**") represent a station owned by Community Educational Television, a TBN subsidiary.

==== Current owned-and-operated stations ====
City of license/Market	Station	Owned since
Albuquerque, New Mexico	KNAT-TV 23	1986
Bartlesville - Tulsa, Oklahoma	KDOR-TV 17	1987
Beaumont, Texas	KITU-TV 34^{**++}	1986
Burlington, New Jersey - Philadelphia, Pennsylvania	WGTW-TV 48	2004
Cocoa - Orlando, Florida	WHLV-TV 51	2006
Dallas - Fort Worth, Texas	KDTX-TV 58^{++}	1987
Dalton, Georgia - Chattanooga, Tennessee	WELF-TV 23	1994
Fort Pierce - West Palm Beach, Florida	WTCE-TV 21^{**++}	1990
Gadsden - Birmingham, Alabama	WTJP-TV 60^{++}	1986
Galesburg - Moline, Illinois - Davenport, Iowa	WMWC-TV 53	2012
Greeley - Denver, Colorado	KPJR-TV 38	2009
Harlingen, Texas	KLUJ-TV 44^{**++}	1986
Hendersonville - Nashville, Tennessee	WPGD-TV 50^{++}	1992
Holly Springs, Mississippi - Memphis, Tennessee	WBUY-TV 40	2001
Honolulu, Hawaii	KAAH-TV 26	1996
Houston, Texas	KETH-TV 14^{**++}	1987
Jacksonville, Florida	WJEB-TV 59^{**++}	1991
La Salle - Chicago, Illinois	WWTO-TV 35^{++}	1986
Magee - Jackson, Mississippi	WRBJ-TV 34	2013
Mayville - Milwaukee, Wisconsin	WWRS-TV 34	1997
Miami - Fort Lauderdale, Florida	WHFT-TV 45	1980
Mobile, Alabama	WMPV-TV 20^{++}	1986
Montgomery, Alabama	WMCF-TV 45^{++}	1986
Monroe - Atlanta, Georgia	WHSG-TV 63	1998
Oklahoma City, Oklahoma	KTBO-TV 14^{++}	1981
Phoenix, Arizona	KPAZ-TV 21	1977
Portland, Oregon	KNMT 24	1989
Poughkeepsie - New York City, New York	WTBY-TV 54	1983
St. Joseph - Kansas City, Missouri	KTAJ-TV 16	1986
San Antonio, Texas	KHCE-TV 23^{**++}	1989
Santa Ana - Los Angeles, California	KTBN-TV 40	1974
Tacoma - Seattle, Washington	KTBW-TV 20	1984
Virginia Beach, Virginia	WTPC-TV 21	2006

==== Former owned-and-operated stations ====
City of license/Market	Station	Years owned
Canton - Cleveland, Ohio	WDLI-TV 17	1986–2018
Newark - Columbus, Ohio	WSFJ-TV 51	2007–2018
Richmond, Indiana - Dayton - Cincinnati, Ohio	WKOI-TV 43	1982–2018
Bloomington - Indianapolis, Indiana	WCLJ-TV 42	1987–2018

Until 2018, TBN never sold any of its full-power television stations (either one it owns outright or through its Community Educational Television subsidiary), though several translator stations have been sold off since the digital transition to other parties for either spectrum speculation, to become translators of other commercial stations, or in the case of W41BN in Dothan, Alabama, to become an affiliate of one of the major broadcast networks; in that case W41BN is now WRGX-LD, the market's NBC affiliate under the ownership of Gray Television. Several other translator stations have been taken off-the-air completely as TBN's distribution has become concentrated on pay television and IPTV distribution, due to the prohibitive costs of upgrading the entire network's translator system to digital.

In September 2018, TBN completed the sale of full-power station WDLI-TV to Ion Media, with whom it had entered into a channel sharing agreement in March 2018 involving Ion's WVPX-TV; Ion chose to exploit WDLI-TV's full-market cable and satellite coverage for carriage of Ion Life/Plus in Cleveland, formerly carried on WVPX-DT3. The same transaction resulted in the sale of WKOI-TV to Ion Media which allowed dual-market carriage of Ion Television in Dayton and Cincinnati after TBN entered into a channel sharing agreement with WDTN, WSFJ-TV's channel share with Daystar's WCLL-CD resulted in full-market coverage of Ion Plus in the Columbus market, and the same arrangement with Ion's WIPX-TV resulted in WCLJ becoming a primary Ion Plus station for the Indianapolis market.

=== Tri-State Christian Television ===
==== Current owned-and-operated stations ====
City of license/Market	Station
Alexandria, Minnesota	KONC 7
Anaheim - Los Angeles, California	KDOC-TV 56
Angola, Indiana	WINM 12
Athens - Atlanta, Georgia	WIGL-LD 38
Atlantic City, New Jersey - Philadelphia, Pennsylvania	WACP 4
Baxley - Savannah, Georgia	WSCG 34
Bellingham, Washington - Vancouver, British Columbia	KBCB 24
Canton - Akron - Cleveland, Ohio	WRLM 47
Concord - San Francisco, California	KTNC-TV 42
Des Moines, Iowa	KDMI 19
Destin, Florida - Mobile, Alabama	WFBD 48
Duluth, Minnesota	KCWV 27
Fort Wayne, Indiana	WEIJ-LD 38 (repeater of WINM)
Fresno, California	KAIL 7
Greensboro, North Carolina	WLXI-TV 43
Greenville, Mississippi	WFXW 15
Huron, South Dakota	KTTM 12 (repeater of KTTW)
Iowa City, Iowa	KWKB 20
Jackson, Mississippi	WWJX 23
Jamestown - Buffalo, New York	WNYB 26
Kalamazoo, Michigan	WJGP-LD 26 (repeater of WTLJ)
Marion, Illinois	WTCT 27 (flagship station)
Memphis, Tennessee	WTWV 23
Muskegon - Grand Rapids, Michigan	WTLJ 54
Rochester, New York	WNIB-LD 42 (repeater of WNYB)
Saginaw - Flint, Michigan	WAQP 49
Salt Lake City, Utah	KPNZ 24
Selma - Montgomery, Alabama	WBIH 29
Senatobia, Mississippi	WWTW 34
Sioux Falls, South Dakota	KTTW 7
Twin Falls, Idaho	KXTF 35
Wake Forest - Raleigh - Durham, North Carolina	WRAY-TV 30

=== UniMás ===
==== Current owned-and-operated stations ====
City of license/Market	Station	Owned since
Albuquerque, New Mexico	KTFQ-TV 14 (Note: Univision Communications holds the license to this station, though it is operated by Entravision Communications.)	2003
Atlanta, Georgia	WUVG-DT2 34.2	2002
Austin, Texas	KTFO-CD 31	2002
Bakersfield, California	KBTF-CD 31; KTFB-CA 4 (Note: KBTF-CD's signal is rebroadcast on the third digital subchannel of co-owned Univision outlet KUVI-DT (virtual channel 45.3, digital channel 45).)	N/A
Boston, Massachusetts	WUTF-DT 66	2002
Dallas-Fort Worth, Texas	KSTR-DT 49	2002
Denver, Colorado	KTFD-DT 14	2005
Douglas, Arizona	KFTU-CD 18 (repeater of KFTU-DT)	N/A
Fresno, California	KTFF-DT 61	2003
Houston-Alvin, Texas	KFTH-DT 67	2002
Joliet - Chicago, Illinois	WXFT-DT 60	2002
Los Angeles, California	KFTR-DT 46	2002
Miami - Fort Lauderdale, Florida	WAMI-DT 69	2002
Modesto - Sacramento - Stockton, California	KTFK-DT 64	2003
Newark - New York City, New York	WFUT-DT 68	2002
Orlando - Daytona Beach - Melbourne, Florida	WOTF-DT 43	2002
Philadelphia, Pennsylvania	WFPA-CD 65 (Note: WFPA-CD's signal is rebroadcast on the second digital subchannel of co-owned Univision outlet WUVP-DT (virtual channel 65.2, digital channel 29).)	2002
Raleigh - Durham, North Carolina	WTNC-LD 26	N/A
Phoenix - Flagstaff, Arizona	KFPH-DT 13	2002
San Antonio - Blanco, Texas	KNIC-DT 17 (Note: KNIC-DT is the only UniMás station to be built and signed on by Univision Communications.)	2006
San Francisco - Oakland - San Jose, California	KFSF-DT 66	2002
San Juan - Caguas, Puerto Rico	WLII-DT 11 (Note: WLII was operated by Univision Communications under a local marketing agreement with Raycom Media from 2002 to 2005, when Univision purchased the station.)	2005
Smithtown - New York City, New York	WFTY-DT 67 (satellite of WFUT-DT)	2002
Tucson, Arizona	KFTU-DT 3	2002
Tampa - St. Petersburg, Florida	WFTT-DT 62	2002

=== Univision ===
==== Current owned-and-operated stations ====
City of license/Market	Station	Owned since
Atlanta, Georgia	WUVG-DT 34	2002
Austin, Texas	KAKW-DT 62	2002
Bakersfield, California	KABE-CD 39 (Note: KABE's signal is repeated on second digital subchannel of co-owned MyNetworkTV affiliate KUVI-DT (digital subchannel 45.2, UHF digital channel 45).)	N/A
Cleveland, Ohio	WQHS-DT 61	2002
Dallas-Fort Worth, Texas	KUVN-DT 23	1988 (Note: Univision was carried as a secondary affiliation prior to Univision Communications' purchase of the station.)
Fayetteville - Raleigh - Durham, North Carolina	WUVC-DT 40	2003
Fresno - Visalia, California	KFTV-DT 21	1972
Houston, Texas	KXLN-DT 45	1993
Joliet - Chicago, Illinois	WGBO-DT 66	1995
Los Angeles, California	KMEX-DT 34	1962
Miami - Fort Lauderdale - West Palm Beach, Florida	WLTV-DT 23	1971
Modesto - Sacramento, California	KUVS-DT 19	1990s
Paterson, New Jersey - New York City, New York	WXTV-DT 41	1970
Philadelphia, Pennsylvania	WUVP-DT 65	2002
Phoenix, Arizona	KTVW-DT 33	1979
Ponce, Puerto Rico	WSUR-TV 9 (satellite of WLII-DT)	2005
Salt Lake City, Utah	KUTH-DT 32	2008
San Antonio, Texas	KWEX-DT 41	1962
San Francisco, California	KDTV-DT 14	1992
San Juan, Puerto Rico	WLII-DT 11	2005
Tucson, Arizona	KUVE-DT 46	2002
Tucson, Arizona	KUVE-CA 38	N/A
Washington, D.C.	WFDC-DT 14	2002 (Note: Univision was formerly affiliated with co-owned WMDO-CA from 2002 to 2005, WFDC was affiliated with Telefutura during that timeframe.)

=== Weigel Broadcasting Networks ===
The following are stations owned and operated by Weigel Broadcasting, including stations with networks Weigel owns, such as MeTV, MeTV Toons, Dabl, Catchy Comedy, H&I, and others.

==== Current owned-and-operated stations ====
City of license/Market	Station	Owned since	Affiliation
Astoria - Portland, Oregon	KPWT-LD 3	2021	Heroes & Icons
Carlsbad, New Mexico	KKAC 19	2022	Story Television
Cedar City - St. George, Utah	KCSG 8	2017	MeTV
Chicago, Illinois	WWME-CD 23	1992	MeTV Heroes & Icons
Chicago, Illinois	WCIU-TV 26	1964	Independent
Chicago, Illinois	WMEU-CD 48	2004	Independent
Clarksville - Little Rock, Arkansas	KKME-LD 3	2025	Catchy Comedy
Cleveland, Ohio	WOCV-CD 35	2022	Catchy Comedy Story Television
Dallas - Fort Worth, Texas	KAZD 55	2020	WEST MeTV
Des Moines, Iowa	KDIT-CD 45	2021	Catchy Comedy
Ely, Nevada	KKEL 27	2024	Story Television
Evansville, Indiana	WZDS-LD 5	2021	Heroes & Icons
Glenwood Springs - Denver, Colorado	KREG-TV 3	2020	MeTV
Green Bay, Wisconsin	WMEI 31	2024	MeTV
Hartford - New Haven, Connecticut	WHCT-LD 35	2021	MeTV
Houston, Texas	KYAZ 51	2020	MeTV
Indianapolis, Indiana	WJSJ-CD 51	2025	Dabl
Jacksonville, Florida	WJKF-CD 9	2025	Story Television
Kingman - Phoenix, Arizona	KMEE-TV 6	2020	MeTV
Kingman - Phoenix, Arizona	KMEE-LD 40	2020	MeTV
Los Angeles, California	KAZA-TV 54	2018	MeTV
Los Angeles, California	KPOM-CD 14	2021	Catchy Comedy
Los Angeles, California	KHTV-CD 6	2021	MeTV+
Los Angeles, California	KSFV-CD 27	2021	MeTV Toons Heroes & Icons
Los Angeles, California	KVME-TV 20	2021	Jewelry Television
Middletown, New Jersey - Bridgeport, Connecticut - New York City, New York	WJLP 33	2021	MeTV
Middletown, New Jersey - Bridgeport, Connecticut - New York City, New York	WZME 43	2021	Story Television MeTV+
Middletown, New Jersey - Bridgeport, Connecticut - New York City, New York	WNWT-LD 37	2021	Story Television
Milwaukee, Wisconsin	WBME-CD 41	1983	MeTV
Milwaukee, Wisconsin	WDJT-TV 58	1988	CBS
Milwaukee, Wisconsin	WYTU-LD 63	1989	Telemundo
Milwaukee, Wisconsin	WMLW-TV 49	2008	Independent
Nashville, Tennessee	WJFB 44	2020	MeTV
Ocala, Florida	W30EM-D 30	2021	Independent
Ogden - Salt Lake City, Utah	KCSG-LD 8	2017	MeTV
Rockford, Illinois	WFBN-LD 35	1989	Heroes & Icons
San Francisco - Oakland - San Jose, California	KAXT-CD 1	2019	Catchy Comedy
San Francisco - Oakland - San Jose, California	KTLN-TV 68	2019	Heroes & Icons MeTV
Seattle - Tacoma - Bellingham, Washington	KFFV 44	2018	MeTV Heroes & Icons
Seattle - Tacoma - Bellingham, Washington	KVOS-TV 12	2018	Univision
Silver City, New Mexico	KKAD 10	2022	Start TV
South Bend, Indiana	WBND-LD 57	1990	ABC MeTV
South Bend, Indiana	WMYS-LD 69	1987	MyNetworkTV
South Bend, Indiana	WCWW-LD 25	2002	The CW
St. Louis, Missouri	KNLC 24	2017	MeTV
Tonopah - Las Vegas, Nevada	KBWT 9	2022	Dabl
Truth or Consequences, New Mexico	KKAB 12	2025	WEST
Washington, D.C.	WDME-CD 48	2021	MeTV
Yorktown - Norfolk, Virginia	WYSJ-CD 19	2025	Story Television

=== O&O stations of defunct major television networks in the United States ===
==== DuMont Television Network ====
City of license/Market	Station	Years owned	Current ownership status
New York, New York	WABD 5	1944–1956	Fox O&O, WNYW owned by Fox Television Stations
Pittsburgh, Pennsylvania	WDTV 2	1949–1954	CBS O&O, KDKA-TV owned by CBS News and Stations
Washington, D.C.	WTTG 5	1946–1956	Fox O&O owned by Fox Television Stations

==== UPN ====
UPN was co-founded by United Television / Chris-Craft Television and Paramount Pictures, and launched on January 16, 1995.

City of license/Market	Station	Years owned	Current ownership status
Atlanta, Georgia	WUPA 69	1995–2006	CBS O&O owned by CBS News and Stations
Baltimore, Maryland	WUTB 24	1998–2000	TBD affiliate owned by Deerfield Media (Operated through an SSA by Sinclair Broadcast Group)
Boston, Massachusetts	WSBK-TV 38	1995–2006	Independent station owned by Paramount Skydance
Columbus, Ohio	WWHO 53	1995–2005	CW affiliate owned by Manhan Media (Operated through an LMA by Sinclair Broadcast Group)
Dallas - Fort Worth, Texas	KTXA 21	1995–2006	Independent station owned by CBS News and Stations
Detroit, Michigan	WKBD-TV 50	1995–2006	CW affiliate owned by Paramount Skydance
Houston, Texas	KTXH 20	1995–2000	MyNetworkTV O&O owned by Fox Television Stations
Indianapolis, Indiana	WNDY-TV 23	1999–2006	MyNetworkTV affiliate owned by Circle City Broadcasting
Los Angeles, California	KCOP-TV 13	1995–2000	MyNetworkTV O&O owned by Fox Television Stations
Miami, Florida	WBFS-TV 33	1995–2006	CW affiliate owned by Paramount Skydance
Minneapolis - St. Paul, Minnesota	KMSP-TV 9	1995–2001	Fox O&O owned by Fox Television Stations
New Orleans - Slidell, Louisiana	WUPL 54	1995–2006	MyNetworkTV affiliate owned by Tegna, Inc.
Norfolk, Virginia	WGNT 27	1995–2006	CW affiliate owned by E. W. Scripps Company
Oklahoma City, Oklahoma	KAUT-TV 43	1998–2005	CW O&O owned by Nexstar Media Group
Orlando, Florida	WRBW 65	1996–2000	MyNetworkTV O&O owned by Fox Television Stations
Phoenix, Arizona	KUTP 45	1995–2000	MyNetworkTV O&O owned by Fox Television Stations
Philadelphia, Pennsylvania	WPSG 57	1995–2006	Independent station owned by Paramount Skydance
Pittsburgh - Jeannette, Pennsylvania	WNPA-TV 19	1998–2006	Independent station, WPKD-TV, owned by Paramount Skydance
Portland, Oregon	KPTV 12	1995–2000	Fox affiliate owned by the Gray Television
Providence, Rhode Island	WLWC 28	1997–2006	Court TV affiliate owned by Inyo Broadcast Holdings
Sacramento, California	KMAX-TV 31	1998–2006	Independent station owned by Paramount Skydance
San Antonio, Texas	KRRT 35	1995–1996	Dabl affiliate, KMYS, owned by Deerfield Media (Operated through an SSA by Sinclair Broadcast Group)
San Francisco, California	KBHK-TV 44	1995–2006	Independent station, KPYX, owned by Paramount Skydance
Seattle - Tacoma, Washington	KSTW 11	1997–2006	Independent station owned by Paramount Skydance
Secaucus, New Jersey - New York City, New York	WWOR-TV 9	1995–2000	MyNetworkTV O&O owned by Fox Television Stations
Washington, D.C.	WDCA 20	1995–2000	MyNetworkTV O&O owned by Fox Television Stations
West Palm Beach, Florida	WTVX 34	1997–2006	CW affiliate owned by Sinclair Broadcast Group
Wichita, Kansas	KMTW 36	2000–2001	MyNetworkTV affiliate owned by Mercury Broadcasting Company (Operated through an LMA by Sinclair Broadcast Group)
