= List of Trinity Broadcasting Network stations =

This is a list of affiliates of the Trinity Broadcasting Network (TBN), a religious television network founded by Paul and Jan Crouch. All stations listed here are owned and operated directly by TBN or owned by TBN subsidiary Community Educational Television, unless otherwise noted.

- (**) – Indicates station was built and signed on by TBN or a TBN subsidiary.

== Affiliates ==
Affiliates of the Trinity Broadcasting Network
Media market	State	Station	Channel	Owner	Notes
Berry	Alabama	WSFG-LD	51.6	Ettie Clark	(Note: Primary channel is affiliated with Daystar.)
Birmingham	Alabama	WTJP-TV **	60	Trinity Broadcasting Network	
Fayette	Alabama	WSSF-LD	51.6	Ettie Clark	
Mobile	Alabama	WMPV-TV **	21	Trinity Broadcasting Network	
Montgomery	Alabama	WMCF-TV **	45	Trinity Broadcasting Network	
Phoenix	Arizona	KPAZ-TV	21	Trinity Broadcasting Network	
Los Angeles	California	KTBN-TV	40	Trinity Broadcasting Network	
Denver	Colorado	KPJR-TV	38	Trinity Broadcasting Network	
Jacksonville	Florida	WJEB-TV **	59	Community Educational Television	(Note: Community Educational Television is a fully-owned subsidiary of TBN.)
Melbourne	Florida	W19EM-D	32	Edge Spectrum	
Miami–Fort Lauderdale	Florida	WHFT-TV	45	Trinity Broadcasting Network	
Orlando	Florida	WHLV-TV	52	Trinity Broadcasting Network	
West Palm Beach	Florida	WTCE-TV **	21	Community Educational Television	
Atlanta	Georgia	WHSG-TV	63	Trinity Broadcasting Network	
Honolulu	Hawaii	KAAH-TV	26	Trinity Broadcasting Network	
Boise	Idaho	KZTN-LD	20	Celebration Praise, LLC	
Chicago	Illinois	WWTO-TV	35	Trinity Broadcasting Network	(Note: Both stations share channel spectrum)
Plano	Illinois	WLPD-CD	30	Trinity Broadcasting Network	(Note: Both stations share channel spectrum)
Davenport	Iowa	WMWC-TV	53	Trinity Broadcasting Network	
Louisville	Kentucky	WJYL-CD	16	Dominion Media, Inc.	
Louisville	Kentucky	WMYO-CD	24.7	New Albany Broadcasting Co.	
Shreveport	Louisiana	K27NA-D	42	Edge Spectrum	
Grand Rapids	Michigan	W27ED-D	48	Edge Spectrum	
St. James	Minnesota	K22MQ-D	22	Cooperative Television	
Willmar	Minnesota	K28IF-D	28	UHF TV, Inc.	
Jackson	Mississippi	WRBJ-TV	34	Trinity Broadcasting Network	
St. Joseph–Kansas City	Missouri	KTAJ-TV	16	Trinity Broadcasting Network	
Great Falls	Montana	KJJC-DT3	16.3	KTGF License Corporation	(Note: Primary channel is affiliated with MeTV.)
Helena	Montana	KJJC-LD3	7.3	KTGF License Corporation	
Kalispell	Montana	K26DD-D	26	American Covenant Senior Housing Foundation, Inc.	
Edison	New Jersey	WDVB-CD	23.2	Trinity Broadcasting Network	(Note: Both stations share channel spectrum)
New York City	New York	WTBY-TV	54	Trinity Broadcasting Network	(Note: Both stations share channel spectrum)
Philadelphia	Pennsylvania	WGTW-TV	48	Trinity Broadcasting Network	(Note: Shares channel spectrum with WMGM-TV in Wildwood, NJ)
Albuquerque–Santa Fe	New Mexico	KNAT-TV	23	Trinity Broadcasting Network	
Oklahoma City	Oklahoma	KTBO-TV **	14	Trinity Broadcasting Network	
Tulsa	Oklahoma	KDOR-TV	17	Trinity Broadcasting Network	
Portland	Oregon	KNMT	24	Trinity Broadcasting Network	
Chattanooga	Tennessee	WELF-TV	23	Trinity Broadcasting Network	
Memphis	Tennessee	WBUY-TV	40	Trinity Broadcasting Network	
Nashville	Tennessee	WPGD-TV **	50	Trinity Broadcasting Network	
Nashville	Tennessee	WJNK-LD	50	Edge Spectrum	
Beaumont–Port Arthur	Texas	KITU-TV **	34	Community Educational Television	
Dallas–Fort Worth	Texas	K26KC-D	7	Edge Spectrum	
Dallas–Fort Worth	Texas	KDTX-TV **	58	Trinity Broadcasting Network	
Harlingen–Brownsville–McAllen	Texas	KLUJ-TV **	44	Community Educational Television	
Houston	Texas	KETH-TV **	14	Community Educational Television	
San Antonio	Texas	KHCE-TV **	23	Community Educational Television	
Virginia Beach	Virginia	WTPC-TV	21	Trinity Broadcasting Network	
Ellensburg	Washington	K27OO-D	45	Christian Broadcasting of Yakima	
Tacoma–Seattle	Washington	KTBW-TV	20	Trinity Broadcasting Network	
Yakima	Washington	KDHW-CD	45	Christian Broadcasting of Yakima	
Milwaukee–Madison	Wisconsin	WWRS-TV	52	Trinity Broadcasting Network	
