= KETH-TV =

Television station in Houston

- Houston, Texas; United States
- Channels: Digital: 24 (UHF); Virtual: 14

Programming
- Affiliations: 14.1: TBN; 14.2: TBN Inspire; 14.3: TBN Enlace USA

Ownership
- Owner: Trinity Broadcasting Network; (Community Educational Television, Inc.)
- Sister stations: KHCE-TV, KITU-TV, KLUJ-TV, KDTX-TV

History
- Founded: October 12, 1983
- First air date: July 16, 1987
- Former channel numbers: Analog: 14 (UHF, 1987–2009)
- Call sign meaning: Educational Television Houston

Technical information
- Licensing authority: FCC
- Facility ID: 12895
- ERP: 1,000 kW
- HAAT: 580 m (1,903 ft)
- Transmitter coordinates: 29°34′15″N 95°30′37″W

Links
- Public license information: Public file; LMS
- Website: KETH page on TBN's website

KETH-TV (channel 14) is a religious television station in Houston, Texas, United States. It is owned by the Trinity Broadcasting Network through its Community Educational Television subsidiary, which manages stations in Texas and Florida on channels allocated for non-commercial educational broadcasting, and serves as the subsidiary's flagship station. KETH-TV's studios (and CET's general offices) are located on South Wilcrest Drive in the Alief section of Houston. The station's transmitter is located near Missouri City, in unincorporated northeastern Fort Bend County.

== History ==
The station was founded on October 12, 1983, and first signed on the air on July 16, 1987, owned and operated by Community Educational Television, a subsidiary of TBN, since its inception.

== Programming ==
As with other CET stations, KETH carries almost all of the TBN network schedule (though with program promos and public service announcements replacing commercial advertising aired on its national feed and commercially-licensed stations), as well as some locally produced programs: a local version of Praise the Lord, Up with the Son and Joy in Our Town. In addition to programming from TBN, the station airs educational programming to prepare local students for the GED test to fulfill the requirements under their license service.

== Technical information ==
=== Subchannels ===
The station's signal is multiplexed:

Subchannels of KETH-TV
Subchannel	Res.	Short name	Programming
14.1	720p	TBN HD	TBN
14.2	720p	inspire	TBN Inspire
14.3	480i	Enlace	TBN Enlace USA (4:3)

=== Analog-to-digital conversion ===
TBN-owned full-power stations permanently ceased analog transmissions on April 16, 2009.
