= KHCE-TV =

Television station in San Antonio

- San Antonio, Texas; United States
- Channels: Digital: 16 (UHF); Virtual: 23

Programming
- Affiliations: 23.1: TBN; for others, see § Subchannels

Ownership
- Owner: Trinity Broadcasting Network; (San Antonio Community Educational Television, Inc.)
- Sister stations: KETH-TV, KITU-TV, KLUJ-TV, KDTX-TV

History
- First air date: July 4, 1989
- Former call signs: KHCE (1989–2005)
- Former channel numbers: Analog: 23 (UHF, 1989–2009)
- Call sign meaning: Hispanic Community Educational Television (original licensee)

Technical information
- Licensing authority: FCC
- Facility ID: 27300
- ERP: 850 kW
- HAAT: 328 m (1,076 ft)
- Transmitter coordinates: 29°17′24″N 98°15′20″W

Links
- Public license information: Public file; LMS

KHCE-TV (channel 23) is a religious television station in San Antonio, Texas, United States. It is owned by the Trinity Broadcasting Network through its Community Educational Television subsidiary, which manages stations in Texas and Florida on channels allocated for non-commercial educational broadcasting. KHCE-TV's studios are located on Capital Port Drive in northwest San Antonio, and its transmitter is located off Route 181 in northwest Wilson County (northeast of Elmendorf).

== Background ==
The station first signed on the air on July 4, 1989; it was one of the first stations to be built and signed on the air by TBN subsidiary Community Educational Television. KHCE's programming was also previously simulcast on a low-power translator station, K20BW in San Antonio; this translator ceased operations in 2010, and has since been sold to Digital Networks - Southwest, LLC.

As with other CET stations, KHCE carries almost all of the TBN network schedule (though with program promos and public service announcements replacing commercial advertising aired on its national feed and commercially-licensed stations), as well as some locally produced programs: a local version of Praise the Lord, Up with the Son and Joy in Our Town. In addition to programming from TBN, the station airs educational programming to prepare local students for the GED test to fulfill the requirements under their license service.

== Subchannels ==
The station's signal is multiplexed:

Subchannels of KHCE-TV
Subchannel	Res.	Short name	Programming
23.1	720p	TBN HD	TBN
23.2	720p	Inspire	TBN Inspire
23.3	480i	Enlace	TBN Enlace USA

TBN-owned full-power stations permanently ceased analog transmissions on April 16, 2009.
