= WJEB-TV =

Television station in Jacksonville, Florida

- Jacksonville, Florida; United States
- Channels: Digital: 21 (UHF); Virtual: 59

Programming
- Affiliations: 59.1: TBN; for others, see § Subchannels

Ownership
- Owner: Community Educational Television; (Trinity Broadcasting Network); (Jacksonville Educators Broadcasting, Inc.)

History
- Founded: May 29, 1991
- Former channel numbers: Analog: 59 (UHF, 1991–2009); Digital: 44 (UHF, until 2020)
- Call sign meaning: Jacksonville Educators Broadcasting (licensee)

Technical information
- Licensing authority: FCC
- Facility ID: 29719
- ERP: 622 kW
- HAAT: 288 m (945 ft)
- Transmitter coordinates: 30°16′35″N 81°33′50.7″W

Links
- Public license information: Public file; LMS
- Website: WJEB page on TBN's website

WJEB-TV (channel 59) is a religious television station in Jacksonville, Florida, United States. It is owned by the Trinity Broadcasting Network through its Community Educational Television subsidiary, which manages stations in Florida and Texas on channels allocated for non-commercial educational broadcasting. WJEB-TV's studios are located on Emerson Expressway/US 1 in southeastern Jacksonville, and its transmitter is located on Newton Road in the city's Brackridge neighborhood.

== Background ==
The station first signed on the air on May 29, 1991, and was built and signed on by the Trinity Broadcasting Network, under the licensee Jacksonville Educators Broadcasting, Inc., operated by the TBN subsidiary Community Educational Television.

As with other CET stations, WJEB carries almost all of the TBN network schedule (though with program promos and public service announcements replacing commercial advertising aired on its national feed and commercially-licensed stations). In addition to programming from TBN, the station airs educational programming to prepare local students for the General Educational Development (GED) test to fulfill the requirements under their license service.

== Subchannels ==
The station's signal is multiplexed:

Subchannels of WJEB-TV
Subchannel	Res.	Short name	Programming
59.1	720p	TBN HD	TBN
59.2	720p	inspire	TBN Inspire
59.3	480i	Enlace	TBN Enlace USA

TBN-owned full-power stations permanently ceased analog transmissions on April 16, 2009.
