= WBUY-TV =

Television station in Holly Springs, Mississippi

- Holly Springs, Mississippi; Memphis, Tennessee; United States
- City: Holly Springs, Mississippi
- Channels: Digital: 26 (UHF); Virtual: 40

Programming
- Affiliations: 40.1: TBN; for others, see § Subchannels

Ownership
- Owner: Trinity Broadcasting Network; (Trinity Broadcasting of Texas, Inc.)

History
- First air date: September 1991
- Former channel numbers: Analog: 40 (UHF, 1991–2009); Digital: 41 (UHF, 2006–2018)

Technical information
- Licensing authority: FCC
- Facility ID: 60830
- ERP: 950 kW
- HAAT: 229.5 m (753 ft)
- Transmitter coordinates: 35°12′34.3″N 89°49′1.4″W

Links
- Public license information: Public file; LMS
- Website: www.tbn.org

WBUY-TV (channel 40) is a religious television station licensed to Holly Springs, Mississippi, United States, serving the Memphis, Tennessee, area. The station is owned by the Trinity Broadcasting Network (TBN). WBUY-TV's transmitter is located in Brunswick, Tennessee.

The station formerly operated from a studio located on Cazassa Road in the southeast section of Memphis. That facility was one of several closed by TBN in 2019 following the Federal Communications Commission (FCC)'s repeal of the "Main Studio Rule", which required full-service television stations like WBUY-TV to maintain facilities in or near their communities of license.

== History ==
WBUY-TV first signed on the air in September 1991, with its original analog transmitter along MS 309 north of Byhalia, Mississippi. It was built and signed on by Sonlight Broadcasting Systems, a broadcast ministry based in Mobile, Alabama, and co-founded by television producer Paul Crouch Jr. and attorney and broadcaster Jay Sekulow. All of Sonlight's stations were affiliated with the Trinity Broadcasting Network (TBN), which was co-founded by Paul Crouch Jr.'s parents Paul Sr. and Jan. As a TBN affiliate, WBUY carried most of the network's schedule while opting out at times to air alternate programming.

In 1997, WBUY was sold, along with the rest of Sonlight's stations, to All American TV (not to be confused with an unrelated television syndication company of a similar name), a minority-owned firm with close ties to TBN. The sale to All American made the station a full-fledged affiliate of the network. WBUY became a TBN owned-and-operated station in 2000, when TBN purchased all of All American's stations.

The station's original permittees intended for channel 40 to broadcast Home Shopping Network (HSN) programs to the Memphis market; the last three letters of the station's call sign incidentally reflected this intended, but unrealized affiliation.

== Subchannels ==
The station's signal is multiplexed:

Subchannels of WBUY-TV
| Subchannel | Res. | Short name | Programming |
|---|---|---|---|
| 40.1 | 720p | TBN HD | TBN |
| 40.2 | 720p | TVDEALS | Infomercials |
| 40.3 | 480i | Inspire | TBN Inspire |
| 40.4 | 480i | ONTV4U | OnTV4U (infomercials) (4:3) |
| 40.5 | 480i | POSITIV | Positiv |

TBN-owned full-power stations permanently ceased analog transmissions on April 16, 2009.
