= WWRS-TV =

Television station in Mayville, Wisconsin

- Mayville–Milwaukee–Madison, Wisconsin; United States
- City: Mayville, Wisconsin
- Channels: Digital: 34 (UHF); Virtual: 52

Programming
- Affiliations: 52.1: TBN; for others, see § Subchannels

Ownership
- Owner: Trinity Broadcasting Network; (Trinity Broadcasting of Texas, Inc.)

History
- First air date: 1997
- Former channel numbers: Analog: 52 (UHF, 1997–2009); Digital: 43 (UHF, until 2019)
- Call sign meaning: Wayne R. Stenz (part of original ownership group)

Technical information
- Licensing authority: FCC
- Facility ID: 68547
- ERP: 504 kW
- HAAT: 186 m (610 ft)
- Transmitter coordinates: 43°26′11.4″N 88°31′33.9″W

Links
- Public license information: Public file; LMS
- Website: www.tbn.org

WWRS-TV (channel 52) is a religious television station licensed to Mayville, Wisconsin, United States, serving the Milwaukee and Madison areas. The station is owned by the Trinity Broadcasting Network (TBN). WWRS-TV's transmitter is located in Hubbard. Its signal covers much of southeastern and south-central Wisconsin, along with extended cable coverage throughout the area.

== History ==
The station was formerly owned by National Minority Television, a de facto subsidiary of TBN that was used by the network to circumvent the Federal Communications Commission (FCC)'s television station ownership restrictions. While TBN founder Paul Crouch was NMTV's president, one of its directors was African American and the other was Latino, which met the FCC's definition of a "minority-controlled" firm. In mid-2008, the station and its NMTV sisters came directly under TBN ownership.

Like most TBN stations, there is no local contributions from WWRS outside passthrough of local Emergency Alert System weather warnings and missing person alerts. TBN typically buys full-power stations mainly to get must-carry status on area cable systems. Until the Main Studio rule in 2019 allowed the closure of local studios, WWRS carried FCC-required public affairs programming (Public Report) from its Brookfield studios, along with Friday morning airings of local church services.

Charter Communications, the dominant cable provider in the Madison area, and several communities in the Milwaukee area before the 2017 purchase of Time Warner Cable and merge into Spectrum, added TBN and all of its digital subchannels to its systems in the area beginning late August 2007, within the provider's digital family tier of channels, with carriage of the station's feed and low-channel carriage on local cable systems depending on must-carry requests; those systems with no such provision with TBN carry the national feed.

== Subchannels ==
The station's signal is multiplexed:

Subchannels of WWRS-TV
Subchannel	Res.	Short name	Programming
52.1	720p	TBN HD	TBN
52.2	720p	TVDEALS	Infomercials
52.3	480i	Inspire	TBN Inspire
52.4	480i	ONTV4U	OnTV4U (infomercials) (4:3)
52.5	480i	POSITIV	Positiv

TBN-owned full-power stations permanently ceased analog transmissions on April 16, 2009. The station's digital signal continued to broadcasts on its pre-transition UHF channel 43, using virtual channel 52.

== Must-carry ==
On April 1, 2002, a dispute arose between Time Warner Cable's Milwaukee-area system and WWRS regarding must-carry regulations. Must-carry regulations require cable television providers within the Grade B contour of a full-power, full service television station to carry that station on their basic tier. When the dispute was settled, the FCC judged that the station was not required to be carried on the cable systems in the more distant counties of Kenosha, Racine and Walworth. However, WWRS was able to exercise must-carry to the Time Warner Cable lineup in the immediate Milwaukee area. This, combined with the lack of available channel space, caused the forced move of Madison's PBS member and PBS Wisconsin flagship station WHA-TV (channel 21) to the digital cable tier in order to air WWRS on the basic cable tier.
