= KTBN-TV =

Television station in Santa Ana, California

- Santa Ana–Los Angeles, California; United States
- City: Santa Ana, California (Note: Originally licensed to Fontana, California; moved to Santa Ana in 1983.)
- Channels: Digital: 33 (UHF); Virtual: 40

Programming
- Affiliations: 40.1: TBN; for others, see § Subchannels

Ownership
- Owner: Trinity Broadcasting Network; (Trinity Christian Center of Santa Ana, Inc.)

History
- First air date: January 5, 1967
- Former call signs: KLXA-TV (1967–1977)
- Former channel numbers: Analog: 40 (UHF, 1967–2009); Digital: 23 (UHF, 2004–2009)
- Former affiliations: English–Spanish Independent (1967–1973)
- Call sign meaning: Trinity Broadcasting Network

Technical information
- Licensing authority: FCC
- Facility ID: 67884
- ERP: 1,000 kW
- HAAT: 875 m (2,871 ft)
- Transmitter coordinates: 34°13′27″N 118°3′47.2″W

Links
- Public license information: Public file; LMS
- Website: www.tbn.org

KTBN-TV (channel 40) is a religious television station licensed to Santa Ana, California, United States, serving the Los Angeles area as the flagship station of the locally based Trinity Broadcasting Network (TBN). The station's offices are located at TBN's headquarters in nearby Tustin, and its transmitter is located atop Mount Wilson.

== History ==
Channel 40 first launched on January 5, 1967, as KLXA-TV, licensed to Fontana but operating from offices and studios at 816 North Highland Avenue in Hollywood. It was Southern California's first bilingual television station. In its first months, KLXA broadcast most days from 4 to 11 p.m., with English programming made up of old movies and 1950s-era reruns of network and syndicated series such as The Whirlybirds, The Phil Silvers Show and Circus Boy, ending with a Lyn Sherwood newscast from 8 to 8:15 p.m. Then, starting with an 8:15–8:30 p.m. newscast from Miguel Alonso, the remainder of the schedule would be telenovelas, variety shows and sporting events (most frequently bullfighting) in Spanish. By 1971, the entire schedule was changed to Spanish-language programming, directly competing with KMEX-TV (channel 34).

TBN founder Paul Crouch began purchasing time in 1973 on KBSA (channel 46, now KFTR), then licensed to Guasti. He wanted to buy the station, but another organization bought it from under his offer. After that station was sold, Crouch began buying two hours of programming time a day on Channel 40 in early 1974; KBSA ran Spanish language entertainment programming several hours a day, with TBN buying two hours program time in the evenings. KLXA was then put up for sale shortly after. Paul Crouch then put in a bid to buy it for $1 million and raised $100,000 for a down payment. After many struggles, the Crouches managed to raise the down payment and took over the station outright. Initially, the station ran locally produced Christian programs about six hours a day. Paul, Jan Crouch, and Jim Bakker hosted the daily religious program Praise the Lord. Other programs included Christian-themed children's programs, church services from their church, bible studies, and public affairs shows. Later in 1974, Jim and Tammy Faye Bakker left TBN to launch their own show in Charlotte, North Carolina, early in 1975, which kept the PTL initials and was called the PTL Club. TBN used the full name Praise the Lord. The Crouches continued to expand their religious programming to twelve hours a day by 1975, and began selling time to outside Christian organizations to supplement their local programming.

Trinity Broadcasting continued to use the KLXA call sign until November 1977, when the station officially became KTBN-TV. The station went to a 24-hour schedule by 1978. Its city of license was later relocated to Santa Ana in 1983. Today, as is the case with TBN's other owned-and-operated stations, KTBN repeats the national TBN feed for almost the entire day. It only breaks off for Southern California–specific public affairs programs. Even when TBN bought other Christian stations (such as WHFT-TV in Miami, among others), the network ended local operations at those stations and replaced their programming with TBN's national feed.

Today, KTBN-TV serves the entire Los Angeles metropolitan area with a full-power signal. The station originally had a network of low-power translators carrying the signal to other areas in Southern California; however, during 2010, these translators went dark due to declining support, which has been attributed to the digital transition, and likely universal carriage of the network by the cable and satellite providers in the region. With the station being available on cable providers throughout Southern California, KTBN is not carried among the Los Angeles market stations available on either Dish Network or DirecTV at TBN's request; the national feed is carried in its place instead.

== Technical information ==
=== Subchannels ===
The station's signal is multiplexed:

Subchannels of KTBN-TV
Channel	Res.	Short name	Programming
40.1	720p	TBN HD	TBN
40.2	720p	TVDEALS	Infomercials
40.3	480i	Inspire	TBN Inspire
40.4	480i	ONTV4U	OnTV4U (infomercials) (4:3)
40.5	480i	POSITIV	Positiv

TBN-owned full-power stations permanently ceased analog transmissions on April 16, 2009.

=== Analog-to-digital conversion ===
KTBN's digital signal, which went on the air in 2004, originally broadcast on channel 23. TBN's request to change the station's digital channel to (UHF) channel 33 was approved by the Federal Communications Commission (FCC) on February 5, 2009. This in effect changed the digital allotment for Santa Ana to channel 33. This decision ultimately displaced low-power station KSMV-LP, which soon converted to digital on channel 23. Queries to the FCC database on KTBN indicated that the station had a construction permit for digital UHF channel 33, which the station used as its final post-transition digital allotment.

=== Former translators ===
KTBN's over-the-air translators K15DB in Lompoc, K21FP in Bakersfield, K26GN in Lancaster, KVVB-LP (channel 33) in Victorville, and K40ID in Palm Springs ceased operations as of 2012.
