= KNMT =

Television station in Portland, Oregon

- Portland–Salem, Oregon; Vancouver, Washington; United States
- City: Portland, Oregon
- Channels: Digital: 32 (UHF); Virtual: 24

Programming
- Affiliations: 24.1: TBN; for others, see § Subchannels

Ownership
- Owner: Trinity Broadcasting Network; (Trinity Broadcasting of Texas, Inc.)

History
- First air date: November 1989 (Note: The Broadcasting and Cable Yearbook says November 17, while the Television and Cable Factbook says November 16.)
- Former call signs: KTDZ-TV (1989–1990)
- Former channel numbers: Analog: 24 (UHF, 1989–2009); Digital: 45 (UHF, 2003–2019)
- Call sign meaning: National Minority Television (former owner)

Technical information
- Licensing authority: FCC
- Facility ID: 47707
- ERP: 777 kW
- HAAT: 455 m (1,493 ft)
- Transmitter coordinates: 45°30′57.8″N 122°44′3.1″W

Links
- Public license information: Public file; LMS
- Website: www.tbn.org

KNMT (channel 24) is a religious television station in Portland, Oregon, United States, owned by the Trinity Broadcasting Network (TBN). The station's transmitter is located in the Sylvan-Highlands section of the city, near the West Hills of Portland.

KNMT's studios, once located on Northeast 74th Avenue in Portland, were sold to a developer to become low income housing.

== History ==
KNMT was founded on June 7, 1985, and began broadcasting operations on November 16, 1989; it was Portland's first full-power, full-service religious broadcast station. The station primarily carries programming from the TBN satellite feed, but also produces and broadcasts locally produced programs such as the religious program Northwest Praise the Lord (a local version of TBN's flagship program Praise the Lord) and the public affairs show Northwest Focus. KNMT began 24-hour operations in February 1990.

The station was formerly owned by National Minority Television (hence its call letters), a de facto subsidiary of TBN that was used by the network to circumvent the Federal Communications Commission (FCC)'s television station ownership restrictions. While TBN founder Paul Crouch was NMTV's president, one of its directors was African American and the other was Latino, which met the FCC's definition of a "minority-controlled" firm. In mid-2008, the station and its NMTV sisters came directly under TBN ownership.

As of 2019, only KNMT-DT1 and the satellite feed of Enlace are carried by Comcast locally.

== Subchannels ==
The station's signal is multiplexed:

Subchannels of KNMT
Subchannel	Res.	Short name	Programming
24.1	720p	TBN HD	TBN
24.2	720p	TVDEALS	Infomercials
24.3	480i	Inspire	TBN Inspire
24.4	480i	ONTV4U	OnTV4U (infomercials) (4:3)
24.5	480i	POSITIV	Positiv

TBN-owned full-power stations permanently ceased analog transmissions on April 16, 2009. KNMT's digital signal remained on its pre-transition UHF channel 45 (although it was originally slated to move its digital signal to UHF channel 24), using virtual channel 24.
