= KPJR-TV =

Television station in Greeley, Colorado

- Greeley–Denver, Colorado; United States
- City: Greeley, Colorado
- Channels: Digital: 17 (UHF); Virtual: 38

Programming
- Affiliations: 38.1: TBN; for others, see § Subchannels

Ownership
- Owner: Trinity Broadcasting Network; (Trinity Broadcasting of Texas, Inc.)

History
- First air date: June 12, 2009
- Former channel numbers: Digital: 38 (UHF, 2009–2019)

Technical information
- Licensing authority: FCC
- Facility ID: 166510
- ERP: 633 kW
- HAAT: 362 m (1,188 ft)
- Transmitter coordinates: 40°5′59″N 104°54′4″W

Links
- Public license information: Public file; LMS
- Website: www.tbn.org

KPJR-TV (channel 38) is a religious television station licensed to Greeley, Colorado, United States, serving the Denver area. The station is owned by the Trinity Broadcasting Network (TBN). KPJR-TV's transmitter is located in Weld County, east of Frederick, Colorado.

The station formerly operated from a studio located on Yates Street in Westminster. TBN closed the facility in 2018 and sold it to Christian Television Network, ahead of the Federal Communications Commission's 2019 abolition of the "Main Studio Rule".

== History ==
KPJR-TV first signed on the air on June 12, 2009; as it launched on the date on which full-power television stations in the United States transitioned from analog to digital broadcasts under federal mandate, the station was the first television station in the Denver market that did not launch with a companion analog signal.

== Subchannels ==
The station's signal is multiplexed:

Subchannels of KPJR-TV
Subchannel	Res.	Short name	Programming
38.1	720p	TBN HD	TBN
38.2	720p	TVDEALS	Infomercials
38.3	480i	Inspire	TBN Inspire
38.4	480i	ONTV4U	OnTV4U (infomercials) (4:3)
38.5	480i	POSITIV	Positiv
