= WTPC-TV =

Television station in Virginia Beach, Virginia

- Virginia Beach, Virginia; United States
- Channels: Digital: 7 (VHF); Virtual: 21

Programming
- Affiliations: 21.1: TBN; for others, see § Subchannels

Ownership
- Owner: Trinity Broadcasting Network; (Trinity Broadcasting of Texas, Inc.)

History
- First air date: March 27, 2006
- Former call signs: WHRE (2006–August 2010); WHRE-TV (August−November 2010)
- Former channel numbers: Analog: 21 (UHF, 2006–2009)
- Call sign meaning: Trinity, Paul Crouch (founder of TBN)

Technical information
- Licensing authority: FCC
- Facility ID: 82574
- ERP: 85 kW
- HAAT: 310 m (1,017 ft)
- Transmitter coordinates: 36°48′31.8″N 76°30′11.3″W

Links
- Public license information: Public file; LMS
- Website: www.tbn.org

WTPC-TV (channel 21) is a religious television station licensed to Virginia Beach, Virginia, United States, serving the Hampton Roads area. The station is owned by the Trinity Broadcasting Network (TBN). WTPC-TV's transmitter is located in Suffolk, Virginia.

== History ==
The station signed on March 26, 2006, as WHRE. It was originally owned by Copeland Channel 21, LLC, but has always been programmed by TBN. TBN filed to purchase the station outright in May 2010. WHRE added the "-TV" suffix on August 26, 2010. The call letters were changed to WTPC-TV on November 15, 2010.

== Technical information ==
=== Subchannels ===
The station's signal is multiplexed:

Subchannels of WTPC-TV
Subchannel	Res.	Short name	Programming
21.1	720p	TBN HD	TBN
21.2	720p	TVDEALS	Infomercials
21.3	480i	Inspire	TBN Inspire
21.4	480i	ONTV4U	OnTV4U (infomercials) (4:3)
21.5	480i	POSITIV	Positiv

TBN-owned full-power stations permanently ceased analog transmissions on April 16, 2009.

=== Analog-to-digital conversion ===
Because it was granted an original construction permit after the FCC finalized the DTV allotment plan on April 21, 1997, WTPC-TV (as WHRE) did not receive a companion channel for a digital television station. The station shut down its analog signal, over UHF channel 21, on February 17, 2009, and "flash-cut" its digital signal into operation to VHF channel 7, using virtual channel 21.
