= KDOR-TV =

Television station in Bartlesville, Oklahoma

- Bartlesville–Tulsa, Oklahoma; United States
- City: Bartlesville, Oklahoma
- Channels: Digital: 36 (UHF); Virtual: 17

Programming
- Affiliations: 17.1: TBN; for others, see § Subchannels

Ownership
- Owner: Trinity Broadcasting Network; (Trinity Broadcasting of Texas, Inc.)

History
- First air date: January 1987 (Note: The Broadcasting and Cable Yearbook says January 11, while the Television and Cable Factbook says January 10.)
- Former call signs: KDOR (1987–2003)
- Former channel numbers: Analog: 17 (UHF, 1987–2009); Digital: 15 (UHF, until 2009), 17 (UHF, 2009–2019)

Technical information
- Licensing authority: FCC
- Facility ID: 1005
- ERP: 1,000 kW
- HAAT: 315.4 m (1,035 ft)
- Transmitter coordinates: 36°30′56.6″N 95°46′15.3″W

Links
- Public license information: Public file; LMS
- Website: www.tbn.org

KDOR-TV (channel 17) is a religious television station licensed to Bartlesville, Oklahoma, United States, serving the Tulsa area. The station is owned by the Trinity Broadcasting Network (TBN). KDOR-TV's transmitter is located in rural northwestern Rogers County (southwest of Talala). As of 2018, the station's studio facilities on North Yellowwood Avenue (east of the Mingo Valley Expressway) in Broken Arrow are closed. Broadcasts continue as all program content is generated at TBN's International Production Center in Irving, Texas.

== Subchannels ==
The station's signal is multiplexed:

Subchannels of KDOR-TV
Subchannel	Res.	Short name	Programming
17.1	720p	TBN HD	TBN
17.2	720p	TVDEALS	Infomercials
17.3	480i	Inspire	TBN Inspire
17.4	480i	ONTV4U	OnTV4U (infomercials) (4:3)
17.5	480i	POSITIV	Positiv

TBN-owned full-power stations permanently ceased analog transmissions on April 16, 2009.
