= KTBW-TV =

Television station in Tacoma, Washington

- Tacoma–Seattle, Washington; United States
- City: Tacoma, Washington
- Channels: Digital: 21 (UHF); Virtual: 20

Programming
- Affiliations: 20.1: TBN; for others, see § Subchannels

Ownership
- Owner: Trinity Broadcasting Network; (Trinity Broadcasting of Washington)

History
- First air date: March 30, 1984
- Former call signs: KQFB (1984)
- Former channel numbers: Analog: 20 (UHF, 1984–2009); Digital: 14 (UHF, until 2019)
- Former affiliations: Independent (1984–1986)
- Call sign meaning: Trinity Broadcasting of Washington

Technical information
- Licensing authority: FCC
- Facility ID: 67950
- ERP: 107 kW
- HAAT: 473 m (1,552 ft)
- Transmitter coordinates: 47°32′49″N 122°47′44″W

Links
- Public license information: Public file; LMS
- Website: www.tbn.org

KTBW-TV (channel 20) is a religious television station licensed to Tacoma, Washington, United States, serving the Seattle area. The station is owned by the Trinity Broadcasting Network (TBN). KTBW-TV's studios are located on South 341st Place in Federal Way, and its transmitter is located on Gold Mountain near Bremerton.

== History ==
KTBW originally signed on the air with the call sign KQFB on March 30, 1984. As KQFB, the station was originally locally owned by Family Broadcasting based in University Place, Washington. Family Broadcasting originally was going to broadcast Christian programming from several sources. Before the station went on the air, a minority interest in KQFB was acquired by the Trinity Broadcasting Network. When TBN acquired Family Broadcasting in full, the call letters were changed to KTBW on December 18, 1984.

== Subchannels ==
The station's signal is multiplexed:

Subchannels of KTBW-TV
Subchannel	Res.	Short name	Programming
20.1	720p	TBN HD	TBN
20.2	720p	TVDEALS	Infomercials
20.3	480i	Inspire	TBN Inspire
20.4	480i	ONTV4U	OnTV4U (infomercials) (4:3)
20.5	480i	POSITIV	Positiv

TBN-owned full-power stations permanently ceased analog transmissions on April 16, 2009.
