= WELF-TV =

Television station in Dalton, Georgia

- Dalton, Georgia; Chattanooga, Tennessee; United States
- City: Dalton, Georgia
- Channels: Digital: 28 (UHF); Virtual: 23

Programming
- Affiliations: 23.1: TBN; for others, see § Subchannels

Ownership
- Owner: Trinity Broadcasting Network; (Trinity Broadcasting of Texas, Inc.)

History
- Founded: October 2, 1989
- First air date: May 10, 1994
- Former call signs: WELF (1994–2003)
- Former channel numbers: Analog: 23 (UHF, 1994–2009); Digital: 16 (UHF, until 2020)
- Call sign meaning: "With Everlasting Faith"

Technical information
- Licensing authority: FCC
- Facility ID: 60825
- ERP: 475 kW
- HAAT: 413 m (1,355 ft)
- Transmitter coordinates: 34°49′23″N 85°25′6″W

Links
- Public license information: Public file; LMS
- Website: www.tbn.org

WELF-TV (channel 23) is a religious television station licensed to Dalton, Georgia, United States, serving the Chattanooga, Tennessee, area. The station is owned by the Trinity Broadcasting Network (TBN). WELF-TV's transmitter is located on SR 157 in unincorporated west-central Walker County.

== History ==
The station began operations on May 10, 1994. It was built and signed on by Sonlight Broadcasting Systems, a broadcast ministry based in Mobile, Alabama, and co-founded by television producer Paul Crouch Jr. and attorney and broadcaster Jay Sekulow. All of Sonlight's stations were affiliated with TBN, which was co-founded by Paul Crouch Jr.'s parents Paul Sr. and Jan. As a TBN affiliate, WELF carried most of the network's schedule while opting out at times to air alternate programming.

In 1997, WELF was sold, along with the rest of Sonlight's stations, to All American TV (not to be confused with an unrelated television syndication company of a similar name), a minority-owned firm with close ties to TBN; the sale to All American made the station a full-fledged affiliate of the network. WELF became a TBN owned-and-operated station in 2000, when TBN purchased all of All American's stations.

== Technical information ==
The station's signal is multiplexed:

Subchannels of WELF-TV
Subchannel	Res.	Short name	Programming
23.1	720p	TBN HD	TBN
23.2	720p	TVDEALS	Infomercials
23.3	480i	Inspire	TBN Inspire
23.4	480i	ONTV4U	OnTV4U (infomercials) (4:3)
23.5	480i	POSITIV	Positiv

TBN-owned full-power stations permanently ceased analog transmissions on April 16, 2009.
