= WHFT-TV =

Television station in Miami

- Miami–Fort Lauderdale, Florida; United States
- City: Miami, Florida
- Channels: Digital: 28 (UHF); Virtual: 45

Programming
- Affiliations: 45.1: TBN; for others, see § Subchannels

Ownership
- Owner: Trinity Broadcasting Network; (Trinity Broadcasting of Florida, Inc.)

History
- First air date: March 17, 1975
- Former call signs: WFCB-TV (1975–1976)
- Former channel numbers: Analog: 45 (UHF, 1975–2009); Digital: 46 (UHF, 2003–2019)
- Former affiliations: Independent (1975–1980)
- Call sign meaning: World Harvest Florida Television (after the broadcast ministry of the previous owner)

Technical information
- Licensing authority: FCC
- Facility ID: 67971
- ERP: 701 kW
- HAAT: 308 m (1,010 ft)
- Transmitter coordinates: 25°59′35.3″N 80°10′26″W

Links
- Public license information: Public file; LMS
- Website: www.tbn.org

WHFT-TV (channel 45) is a religious television station in Miami, Florida, United States, owned by the Trinity Broadcasting Network (TBN). The station's studios and transmitter are located at the Lakeside Park (formerly Lake Trinity Estates) complex on Pembroke Road in Pembroke Park (with a Hollywood mailing address).

== History ==
The station first signed on the air on March 17, 1975, as WFCB-TV; it originally operated as a religious independent station that was owned by Florida Christian Television. The sign-on took place more than five years after the original construction permit was issued on August 29, 1969. The station aired programming for five hours a day, running a few local church services, Bible instruction programs, children's Christian programming, and programs from nationally known television evangelists. Florida Christian Television's owners were unable to keep the station solvent, so they put the station up for sale in early 1976, with a request to sell it to a Christian ministry.

The Lester Sumrall Evangelistic Association (later known as LeSEA Broadcasting) acquired the station in July 1976, after Florida Christian Television opted to sell for lack of capital. The station's call letters were changed to WHFT-TV (standing for "World Harvest Florida Television"), and the station switched from viewer- to advertiser-supported. Initially, the station's schedule expanded to nine hours a day with the addition of more Christian programming, much of it added by LeSEA, along with televangelist programs such as The 700 Club; a further expansion soon after added additional secular family entertainment shows.

In 1980, a month after Sumrall declared that the station was not for sale, it was announced that WHFT would be purchased by the Trinity Broadcasting Network. While TBN promised to increase programming from local religious ministries, the station dropped all of its secular programs as part of the sale. Productions from the studios included the national Monday-night broadcast of Praise the Lord and a significant portion of TBN's Spanish-language output.

The Pembroke Park mobile home park—mostly home to seasonal French Canadian residents—where WHFT's tower and former studios are located—was purchased by TBN in 1983 to reduce conflicts with neighbors and was known as Trinity Towers. The complex was renamed Lakeside Park Estates in 2017. The tower has been climbed on several occasions—including twice by the same man, ten years apart.

== Subchannels ==
The station's signal is multiplexed:

Subchannels of WHFT-TV
Subchannel	Res.	Short name	Programming
45.1	720p	TBN HD	TBN
45.2	720p	TVDEALS	Infomercials
45.3	480i	Inspire	TBN Inspire
45.4	480i	ONTV4U	OnTV4U (infomercials) (4:3)
45.5	480i	POSITIV	Positiv

TBN-owned full-power stations permanently ceased analog transmissions on April 16, 2009. The station's digital signal continued to broadcast on its pre-transition UHF channel 46, using virtual channel 45.
