= Community Educational Television =

American educational television stations

Community Educational Television, Inc. (CET) is a subsidiary of the Trinity Broadcasting Network (TBN) which owns six TBN-affiliated television stations in Texas and Florida, all on channels allocated for non-commercial educational broadcasting as mandated by the Federal Communications Commission (FCC). CET's general offices, along with its flagship station KETH-TV, are located in the Alief section of Houston.

All CET stations broadcast generally the same schedule as other TBN stations, with some local programs and educational programming (other than the FCC-mandated E/I shows) to satisfy the educational license. As TBN began accepting commercial advertising in the 2020s, these stations carry alternate content during program breaks to maintain their non-commercial licenses.

== Stations ==
- KETH-TV, Houston, Texas (flagship)
- KITU-TV, Beaumont, Texas
- KLUJ-TV, Harlingen, Texas
- KHCE-TV, San Antonio, Texas
- WJEB-TV, Jacksonville, Florida
- WTCE-TV, Fort Pierce, Florida
