= KDTX-TV =

Television station in Dallas

- Dallas–Fort Worth, Texas; United States
- City: Dallas, Texas
- Channels: Digital: 21 (UHF); Virtual: 58

Programming
- Affiliations: 58.1: TBN; for others, see § Subchannels

Ownership
- Owner: Trinity Broadcasting Network; (Trinity Broadcasting of Texas, Inc.)

History
- First air date: February 9, 1987
- Former channel numbers: Analog: 58 (UHF, 1987–2009); Digital: 45 (UHF, 2002–2019)
- Call sign meaning: Dallas, Texas

Technical information
- Licensing authority: FCC
- Facility ID: 67910
- ERP: 735 kW
- HAAT: 494 m (1,621 ft)
- Transmitter coordinates: 32°32′36″N 96°57′32″W

Links
- Public license information: Public file; LMS
- Website: www.tbn.org

KDTX-TV (channel 58) is a religious television station licensed to Dallas, Texas, United States, serving the Dallas–Fort Worth metroplex. The station is owned by the Trinity Broadcasting Network (TBN). KDTX-TV's studios are located at TBN's International Production Center in Irving, and its transmitter is located in Cedar Hill, Texas.

== History ==
The UHF channel 58 allocation in the Dallas–Fort Worth market was initially applied for broadcasting use by the Metroplex Broadcasting Company (owned by Adam Clayton Powell III (son of civil rights activist and congressman Adam Clayton Powell Jr.) and former KDFW (channel 4) anchor/reporter Barbara Harrison) for a television station under the call letters KDIA-TV; the call sign was assigned on January 15, 1985, and was changed to KDTX-TV on July 1.

KDTX-TV first signed on the air on February 9, 1987 (the call letters had previously been used by a radio station on 102.9 FM, now KDMX); it was built and signed on by the Trinity Broadcasting Network. In recent years, KDTX has been considered TBN's second-most important television station (after its flagship station, KTBN-TV in Santa Ana, California), particularly as the Dallas–Fort Worth market has a large religious base. TBN has since moved several of its operations, including some production facilities, to the Metroplex.

== Subchannels ==
The station's signal is multiplexed:

Subchannels of KDTX-TV
Subchannel	Res.	Short name	Programming
58.1	720p	TBN HD	TBN
58.2	720p	TVDEALS	Infomercials
58.3	480i	Inspire	TBN Inspire
58.4	480i	ONTV4U	OnTV4U (infomercials) (4:3)
58.5	480i	POSITIV	Positiv

TBN-owned full-power stations permanently ceased analog transmissions on April 16, 2009.
