= KITU-TV =

Television station in Beaumont, Texas

- Beaumont–Port Arthur–Orange, Texas; United States
- City: Beaumont, Texas
- Channels: Digital: 29 (UHF); Virtual: 34

Programming
- Affiliations: 34.1: TBN; for others, see § Subchannels

Ownership
- Owner: Trinity Broadcasting Network; (Community Educational Television, Inc.)

History
- Founded: November 21, 1984
- First air date: June 17, 1986 (Note: The Broadcasting and Cable Yearbook says June 21, while the Television and Cable Factbook says June 20.)
- Former call signs: KITU (1986–2005)
- Former channel numbers: Analog: 34 (UHF, 1986–2009); Digital: 33 (UHF, until 2018)

Technical information
- Licensing authority: FCC
- Facility ID: 12896
- ERP: 920 kW
- HAAT: 312 m (1,024 ft)
- Transmitter coordinates: 30°10′42″N 93°54′27″W

Links
- Public license information: Public file; LMS
- Website: KITU page on TBN website

KITU-TV (channel 34) is a religious television station in Beaumont, Texas, United States. It is owned by the Trinity Broadcasting Network through its Community Educational Television subsidiary, which manages stations in Texas and Florida on channels allocated for non-commercial educational broadcasting. KITU-TV's studios are located on Interstate 10 in Orange, and its transmitter is located in Mauriceville.

== Subchannels ==
The station's signal is multiplexed:

Subchannels of KITU-TV
Channel	Res.	Short name	Programming
34.1	720p	TBN HD	TBN
34.2	720p	inspire	TBN Inspire
34.3	480i	Enlace	TBN Enlace USA

TBN-owned full-power stations permanently ceased analog transmissions on April 16, 2009.
