= KLUJ-TV =

Television station in Harlingen, Texas

- Harlingen–Brownsville–McAllen, Texas; United States
- City: Harlingen, Texas
- Channels: Digital: 21 (UHF); Virtual: 44

Programming
- Affiliations: 44.1: TBN; for others, see § Subchannels

Ownership
- Owner: Trinity Broadcasting Network; (Community Educational Television, Inc.)

History
- First air date: June 25, 1984
- Former call signs: KLUJ (1984–2005)
- Former channel numbers: Analog: 44 (UHF, 1984–2009); Digital: 34 (UHF, until 2020)
- Former affiliations: Independent (1984–1986)

Technical information
- Licensing authority: FCC
- Facility ID: 12913
- ERP: 33.9 kW
- HAAT: 283 m (928 ft)
- Transmitter coordinates: 26°13′1″N 97°46′49″W

Links
- Public license information: Public file; LMS
- Website: KLUJ-TV information on TBN's website

KLUJ-TV (channel 44) is a religious television station licensed to Harlingen, Texas, United States, serving the Lower Rio Grande Valley. It is owned by the Trinity Broadcasting Network through its Community Educational Television subsidiary, which manages stations in Texas and Florida on channels allocated for non-commercial educational broadcasting. KLUJ-TV's studios are located on Loop 499 in Harlingen, and its transmitter is located near Palm Valley, Texas.

== History ==
The station signed on the air on June 25, 1984, as the Lower Rio Grande Valley's first general-entertainment independent station before switching to TBN in 1986.

== Subchannels ==
The station's signal is multiplexed:

Subchannels of KLUJ-TV
| Subchannel | Res. | Short name | Programming |
|---|---|---|---|
| 44.1 | 720p | TBN HD | TBN |
| 44.2 | 720p | inspire | TBN Inspire |
| 44.3 | 480i | Enlace | Enlace USA (4:3) |

TBN-owned full-power stations permanently ceased analog transmissions on April 16, 2009.
