= Enlace =

Spanish-language religious broadcast television network, 1988-present

- Country: Costa Rica
- Broadcast area: Worldwide

Programming
- Picture format: 1080i HDTV (downscaled to 480i/576i for the SDTV feed)

Ownership
- Owner: Enlace Internacional
- Sister channels: EJTV

History
- Launched: September 9, 1988; 37 years ago (as Canal 23 Costa Rica); November 1, 1996; 29 years ago (as Enlace)
- Former names: Canal 23 (1988–1996)

Links
- Website: enlace.org

Availability

Terrestrial
- Digital UHF (Costa Rica): Channel 23.1 (Main Feed); Channel 23.2 (Enlace+); Channel 23.4 (Enlace Costa Rica)
- Digital terrestrial television (United States): x.4 on TBN stations (select markets)

Enlace is a Latin American Christian-based broadcast television network. The network primarily broadcasts faith-based programming targeted to the Hispanic community. Enlace's primary headquarters are in San José, Costa Rica, with studios, offices, and call centers in most Latin American countries.

In the United States, Enlace is distributed by the Trinity Broadcasting Network (as Enlace TBN) and the broadcast facilities for Enlace's US feed are located in Irving, Texas. TBN stopped distributing Enlace on February 29, 2024 to pay-TV providers and many of its stations to accommodate Phil McGraw's new joint venture network Merit Street, but readded it in several markets with a large Hispanic population due to feedback against the removal of the channel.

Around the world, the channel is broadcast free-to-air via satellite as well on digital terrestrial television in Peru, Costa Rica, Spain, Panama, and Bolivia.

== History ==
Jonas González Rodriguez first got the idea for Enlace in 1981, and in 1984 Rodriguez sent a letter to Costa Rica's National Radio Control Department. On July 17, 1986, he was awarded a television license under Number 167 for use of the channel 23 UHF frequency in the Metropolitan region of Costa Rica.

In 1987, Rodriguez established an office for Canal 23 in San Antonio, TX in the Continental Building. In August 1988, TBN founder Paul Crouch donated a 10-watt transmitter to Canal 23, and engineer Ricardo Jarquín installed it. Canal 23 began transmitting on September 9, 1988. In January 1990 they installed a transmitter with 1000 watts in the Irazú volcano. In 1991 a trademark was filed for the name Enlace. In 1992, Channel 23 installed three repeaters in Limón, Santa Elena and Cerro de la Muerte. In 1994, Channel 23 opened its first studio, and on August 2 of that year, Channel 23 began transmitting via satellite during TBN's flagship program Praise the Lord.

In 1996, Enlace launched a 24/7 broadcast on the Mexican satellite Soldaridad 2, thus extending their signal all over Latin America. In 1998, they upgraded their satellite to Pas-5, thereby extending the network's reach all over Europe. In 2000 they upgraded their satellite once again to Pas-9, also on that year Enlace Juvenil TV was launched. On September 1, 2002, TBN Enlace USA was launched as part of TBN's digital lineup; the network planned to start covering the 10 top Hispanic markets of the country in its first year. In 2003, Enlace started transmitting on the satellites Hispasat-1C and Hotbird 6, thus extending to the Middle East. In 2005, Enlace started transmitting on Galaxy 23 and Galaxy 19 extending to North America. In 2006 they moved transmission to the satellite Galaxy 14.

In 2007, Enlace started retooling their infrastructure in Costa Rica, in addition to launching on the Nossa TV platform in Brazil transmitting from satellite Galaxy 28. In 2008, Enlace and Enlace Juvenil received new imagery and look, and they started transmitting on DirecTV Latin America for the first time from the satellite Galaxy 3C.

== Background ==
The network's lineup consists of faith programs including church services, music videos, concerts, talk shows, children's programs, and movies. Over 80% of its programs are produced in Latin America by ministries such as Claudio Freidzon of Argentina, Cash Luna of Casa De Dios in Guatemala, and U.S. Hispanic organizations such as Guillermo Maldonado of Miami, Florida, and Danilo Montero of Lakewood Church in Houston, Texas.

== Availability ==
The network is accessed via free-to-air satellite. Having been launched in the United States on May 1, 2002, Enlace is currently available through various cable providers nationwide, and previously was carried over-the-air on digital subchannels of TBN owned-and-operated and affiliated stations, usually on the fourth subchannel until February 2024. Enlace is also available across North America, including Mexico on Glorystar Christian Satellite. The network is also streamed on Enlace and TBN's official website for use externally in browsers and media players, available at different speeds for dial-up and broadband connections, and is also available through TBN's iOS, Google Play and Roku apps.

On December 16, 2009, DirecTV in the United States began carrying Enlace on channel 448, making it available for part of its various English, Spanish and international packages. In February 2011, Dish Network began carrying Enlace on channel 9411.
