= TBN Inspire =

Christian broadcast television network, 2002-present

- Country: United States
- Broadcast area: United States, Australia, New Zealand, Pacific Isles
- Headquarters: Tustin, California

Programming
- Language: English
- Picture format: 720p HDTV; (downscaled to 480i/576i for the SDTV feed)

Ownership
- Owner: Trinity Broadcasting Network
- Parent: Olympusat
- Sister channels: Trinity Broadcasting Network; Positiv; Enlace TBN; Yippee TV

History
- Launched: As The Church Channel January 14, 2002; 24 years ago As Hillsong Channel June 1, 2016; 10 years ago As TBN Inspire February 1, 2022; 4 years ago
- Closed: As Hillsong Channel February 25, 2024; 2 years ago (Australia, Foxtel feed)
- Former names: The Church Channel (2002–2016); Hillsong Channel (2016–2022)

Links
- Website: tbninspire.org

Availability

Terrestrial
- Available on full-power and some low-power stations in most markets in the U.S.: x.3 on most TBN owned-and-operated stations and affiliates; check local listings for stations

Streaming media
- Watch TBN: TBN Inspire (free account required)

TBN Inspire is an American Christian broadcast television network owned by the Trinity Broadcasting Network (TBN). It is carried on the digital subchannels of TBN's stations.

The network originally launched as The Church Channel, which focused on carrying brokered broadcasts of various Christian church services. In 2016, the network was re-launched as a broadcast feed of Hillsong Channel—a joint venture with the Hillsong Church, which added its services and original programming to the schedule. In 2022, the network rebranded again as TBN Inspire, maintaining the original format as The Church Channel.

== History ==
The network originally launched on January 14, 2002, as The Church Channel, which was devoted primarily to carrying church service programs from various Christian ministries and denominations, often under brokered arrangements.

Hillsong Channel logo used from June 1, 2016, until December 31, 2021.

On March 9, 2016, TBN announced a partnership with the Sydney-based international congregation Hillsong Church, that would see The Church Channel re-branded as the Hillsong Channel—a network devoted to its ministry, teaching, and worship music. Hillsong founder Brian Houston stated that the channel would be a "Christ-centred, Bible-based television channel that changes mindsets and empowers people to lead and impact in every sphere of life", and would be "constantly looking towards the future–filled with a vision that inspires and influences many." The new channel officially launched June 1, 2016. An over-the-top subscription service, Hillsong Channel Now, launched in November 2017.

On January 1, 2022, the US feed of the network was rebranded as TBN Inspire, with no change in programming. TBN stated in a notice to carriage providers that the change was intended to "speak more clearly to how we are programming the network".

The international Hillsong Channel operations and the Hillsong Channel Now online service were initially unaffected by the January 2022 rebrand in the United States. However, following Hillsong Church's internal investigation over the alleged inappropriate behavior against women by co-founder Brian Houston, and his subsequent resignation as the church's senior global pastor in March 2022, TBN began rebranding its linear Hillsong Channel operations outside the US as TBN Inspire as well beginning April 2022, and removed Hillsong programming from their schedule (with a version operated by TBN Pacific, which is available in Australia, following suit on April 28). The Hillsong Channel website and Hillsong Channel Now service, as operated by the church, remained operational until 2023 with the website redirecting to the Hillsong Church and the service removed from app marketplaces respectively.

On February 25, 2024, Hillsong Channel was removed from the Foxtel platform putting an end to Hillsong Channel globally with the network's YouTube channel renamed to Hillsong Collected.

== Programming ==
TBN Inspire programs a mix of original programming and outside televangelism.

=== As Hillsong Channel ===
Shows not produced by Hillsong or TBN were billed as "partner programs".

- Hillsong Church Services from worldwide Hillsong congregations, including London, Sydney, New York and Los Angeles.
- Best of Hillsong Conference
- Hillsong Conference Live
- What Do You See? with Robert Fergusson
- Brian Houston TV
- Colour Conference: Main Stage, Green Room, The Edition
- Chapel: The College Experience – Services and stories from the Hillsong International Leadership College
- What's Cooking with Young & Free – Cooking series with a comedic bent
- Hillsong Kids: A Big Life – Children's programme for ages 6–12
- Hillsong Kids Jr Cubby House – Children's programme for ages 3–5
- Sex, Love, and Relationships
- "Worship by Hillsong" – Music videos by Hillsong United, Hillsong Worship, and Hillsong Young & Free
- Pastor Robert Morris Ministries (sermons from Gateway Church)
- Elevation Church
- Joel Osteen
- Enjoying Everyday Life

Hillsong Channel also aired specials documentaries, other worship programming and music programming such as a special around Let There Be Light, along with other Hillsong events and short series.

== Availability ==
TBN Inspire is available over-the-air on digital subchannels of TBN stations, and via select U.S. cable providers, Dish Network, Glorystar (free-to-air Galaxy 19) and DirecTV, in the UK and Ireland on Sky and in many nations around the world via direct-to-home satellite, such as ABS1 to India and the Middle East, Hot Bird satellite to Europe, and Agila 2 satellite both C-band and Ku-Band signal in Asia and the Philippines. The network also livestreams its programming on its official website, along with TBN's streaming apps.

In late May 2019, Olympusat, the main provider of TBN's networks to cable providers in the United States (including Spectrum and Xfinity), discontinued carriage of the network, thus affecting carriage of Hillsong Channel to those systems.

=== International versions ===
==== TBN Asia version ====
At around 2017, selected provincial cable operators in the Philippines carried the Hillsong Channel along with TBN Asia. In 2020, Hillsong Channel was launched on SkyCable and Cignal.

On April 1, 2022, it was announced that the Asian feed of Hillsong Channel will rebrand to TBN Inspire on April 8.

==== TBN Pacific version (Australia, New Zealand and rest of Oceania) ====
On July 24, 2016, the IPTV service Fetch TV began carrying the version of Hillsong Channel as operated by TBN Pacific. On September 11, 2016, it was announced that multichannel television provider Foxtel would carry Hillsong Channel on its satellite and cable television services.

In April 2022, it was reported that the particular version would be rebranded as TBN Inspire on April 28, with Hillsong content replaced by TBN original programming (such as Praise), and other worship music and televangelism programming. The change, along with Australian Network 10's removal of Hillsong-produced programs from its schedules, came amid controversies involving Brian Houston, who resigned from his position as senior pastor after being indicted in a misconduct investigation by the ministry.
