= 2025 in American television =

In American television in 2025, notable events included television show debuts, finales, and cancellations; channel launches, closures, and rebrandings; stations changing or adding their network affiliations; information on controversies, business transactions, and carriage disputes; and deaths of those who made various contributions to the medium.

== Television shows ==
=== Shows changing networks ===
Show	Moved from	Moved to	Source
WWE Raw	USA Network	Netflix	
Temptation Island	USA Network	Netflix	
Sesame Street	HBO Max	Netflix	
Beavis and Butt-Head	Paramount+	Comedy Central	
The Challenge: All Stars	Paramount+	MTV	
Project Runway	Bravo	Freeform	
Inside the NBA	TNT	ESPN	
The Match	TNT	Golf Channel	
Law & Order: Organized Crime	NBC	Peacock	
Married at First Sight	Lifetime	Peacock	
Weakest Link	NBC	Fox	
The 1% Club	Amazon Prime Video	Fox	
Love & Hip Hop: Miami	VH1	BET	
100 Days to Indy	The CW	Fox Nation	

=== Notable television films and specials ===
First aired	Title	Channel	Source
January 10	Bill Maher: Is Anyone Else Seeing This?	HBO	
January 14	Diddy: The Making of a Bad Boy	Peacock	
January 17	Henry Danger: The Movie	Nickelodeon/Paramount+	
January 17	Molly-Mae: Behind It All	Amazon Prime Video	
January 18	Girl in the Garage: The Laura Cowan Story	Lifetime	
January 24	Star Trek: Section 31	Paramount+	
January 25	Family Affair	Lifetime	
January 27	Ladies & Gentlemen... 50 Years of SNL Music	NBC	
February 1	Can You Feel the Beat: The Lisa Lisa Story	Lifetime	
February 7	The Lion King At The Hollywood Bowl	Disney+	
February 8	I Will Survive: The Gloria Gaynor Story	Lifetime	
February 12	The Simpsons: The Past and the Furious	Disney+	
February 14	SNL50: The Homecoming Concert	Peacock	
February 16	SNL50: The Anniversary Special	NBC	
February 16	Foul Play with Anthony Davis	TBS	
February 25	Big Family, Big City	TLC	
March 2	Abducted in the Everglades	Lifetime	
March 6	Barbie & Teresa: Recipe for Friendship	Netflix	
March 8	I Was Octomom: The Natalie Suleman Story	Lifetime	
March 21	An Oprah Winfrey Special: The Menopause Revolution	ABC	
April 3	Nature Cat – The Nature-tastic Four Movie!	PBS Kids	
April 7	Wild Kratts: Activate Kid Power	PBS Kids	
May 1	Acoustic Rooster and His Barnyard Band	PBS Kids	
May 13	Joan Rivers: A Dead Funny All-Star Tribute	NBC	
May 17	I Was Honey Boo Boo	Lifetime	
May 30	Lulu Is a Rhinoceros	Apple TV+	
May 31	The Thirteenth Wife: Escaping Polygamy	Lifetime	
May 31	Mountainhead	HBO	
June 29	The Chrisleys: Life After Lockup	Disney+/Hulu	
July 2	Dora and the Search for Sol Dorado	Nickelodeon/Paramount+	
July 20	The Robot Chicken Self-Discovery Special	Adult Swim	
August 15	Snoopy Presents: A Summer Musical	Apple TV+	
August 20	Inside the Worlds of Epic Universe	NBC	
August 22	Ariel: The Glow Crystals	Disney Jr./Disney+	
August 26	Emma and Bruce Willis: The Unexpected Journey – A Diane Sawyer Special	ABC	
August 30	Iyanu: The Age of Wonders	Cartoon Network/HBO Max	
September 10	Downton Abbey Celebrates The Grand Finale	NBC	
September 21	A Grammy Salute to Earth, Wind & Fire: The 21st Night of September	CBS	
September 21	The Happiest Story on Earth: 70 Years of Disneyland	ABC	
October 3	Valiente: A Tracker Story	Nickelodeon	
October 5	A Grammy Salute to Cyndi Lauper: Live From The Hollywood Bowl	CBS	
October 6	Family Guy: A Little Fright Music	Hulu	
October 11	Haul Out the Halloween	Hallmark Channel	
October 16	Spidey and Iron Man: Avengers Team Up!	Disney Jr.	
October 16	Carl the Collector: A Fuzzytown Halloween	PBS Kids	
October 18	A Royal Montana Christmas	Hallmark Channel	
October 19	A Christmas Angel Match	Hallmark Channel	
October 25	Merry Christmas, Ted Cooper!	Hallmark Channel	
November 1	Christmas on Duty	Hallmark Channel	
November 2	A Newport Christmas	Hallmark Channel	
November 2	World's Sweetest Candy Shops	Food Network	
November 3	Dr. Seuss's The Sneetches	Netflix	
November 6	Wicked: One Wonderful Night	NBC	
November 8	Christmas Above the Clouds	Hallmark Channel	
November 8	We ❤ Public Television	PBS	
November 9	A Keller Christmas Vacation	Hallmark Channel	
November 11	The Golden Girls: 40 Years of Laughter and Friendship - Special Edition of 20/20	ABC	
November 14	A Very Jonas Christmas Movie	Disney+/Hulu	
November 15	Three Wisest Men	Hallmark Channel	
November 16	Tidings for the Season	Hallmark Channel	
November 18	Center Stage: Countdown to the CMA Awards – A Special Edition of 20/20	ABC	
November 21	A Loud House Christmas Movie: Naughty or Nice	Nickelodeon	
November 22	He Wasn't Man Enough	Lifetime	
November 22	Holiday Touchdown: A Bills Love Story	Hallmark Channel	
November 23	Melt My Heart This Christmas	Hallmark Channel	
November 24	Everybody Loves Raymond: 30th Anniversary Reunion	CBS	
November 27	We Met in December	Hallmark Channel	
November 27	Prep & Landing: The Snowball Protocol	Disney Channel	
November 28	The Snow Must Go On	Hallmark Channel	
November 28	The More the Merrier	Hallmark Channel	
November 28	A PAW Patrol Christmas	CBS/Paramount+	
November 28	Family Guy: Disney's Hulu's Family Guy's Hallmark Channel's Lifetime's Familiar Holiday Movie	Hulu	
November 29	An Alpine Holiday	Hallmark Channel	
November 29	A Grand Ole Opry Christmas	Hallmark Channel	
November 29	Fake Yourself a Merry Little Christmas	OWN	
November 29	Christmas Everyday	Lifetime	
November 29	The Christmas Campaign	Lifetime	
November 29	Miraculous World: Tokyo Stellar Force	Disney Channel	
November 30	The Christmas Cup	Hallmark Channel	
November 30	Christmas at the Catnip Café	Hallmark Channel	
December 2	Dancing with the Holidays	ABC	
December 2	TMZ Presents: TMZ's Most Outrageous Moments of 2025	Fox	
December 3	With Love, Meghan: Holiday Celebration	Netflix	
December 4	Do You Fear What I Fear	Lifetime	
December 5	Jingle All the Way to Love	Lifetime	
December 5	A Christmas Cookbook	Lifetime	
December 5	The First Snow of Fraggle Rock	Apple TV	
December 5	Transformers: EarthSpark: Hometown Heroes	Paramount+	
December 5	Transformers: EarthSpark: Legacy of Hope	Paramount+	
December 6	She's Making a List	Hallmark Channel	
December 6	The Christmas Showdown	OWN	
December 6	Deck the Hallways	Lifetime	
December 6	Merry Missed Connection	Lifetime	
December 7	Single on the 25th	Hallmark Channel	
December 8	Elmo & Mark Rober's Merry Giftmas	Netflix	
December 9	Kevin Costner Presents: The First Christmas	ABC	
December 12	Taylor Swift: The Eras Tour: The Final Show	Disney+	
December 12	A Runaway Bride for Christmas	Lifetime	
December 12	Christmas in Alaska	Lifetime	
December 12	Sarah Squirm: Live + In the Flesh	HBO	
December 12	Avatar: A New Era – Special Edition of 20/20	ABC	
December 13	A Suite Holiday Romance	Hallmark Channel	
December 13	Very Merry Mystery	OWN	
December 13	Thank God: Christmas at Keller Ranch	Lifetime	
December 13	Rodeo Christmas Romance	Lifetime	
December 13	A Town Hall with Erika Kirk	CBS	
December 14	Oy to the World!	Hallmark Channel	
December 14	White House Christmas 2025	HGTV	
December 16	The Rob Reiner Story: A Hollywood Tragedy – ABC News Special	ABC	
December 18	The Look: A Conversation with Michelle Obama	MS NOW	
December 19	My Lottery Dream Home: David's Happy Ending	HGTV	
December 19	Sweet Holiday Romance	Lifetime	
December 19	Adult Swim's The Elephant	Adult Swim	
December 20	A Make or Break Holiday	Hallmark Channel	
December 20	A Pickleball Christmas	Lifetime	
December 20	A CNN Special Event: Roy Wood Jr.'s Very Very Very Merry Holiday Special	CNN	
December 21	The Christmas Baby	Hallmark Channel	
December 21	CBS News: Rob Reiner – Scenes from a Life	CBS	
December 22	Everybody Loves Raymond: 30th Anniversary Reunion Pt. 2	CBS	
December 22	Christina Aguilera: Christmas in Paris	CBS	
December 28	A Grammy Celebration of Latin Music	CBS	
December 31	A Toast to 2025!	NBC	

=== Milestone episodes and anniversaries ===
Show	Network	Episode #	Episode title	Episode airdate	Source
American Pickers	History Channel	400th episode	"Junkyard Jamboree"	January 1	
Jersey Shore: Family Vacation	MTV	200th episode	"The Reunion (Part 2)"	January 23	
Saturday Night Live	NBC	50th anniversary	SNL50: The Anniversary Special	February 16	
The Price Is Right	CBS	10,000th episode	"10,000th Episode"	February 26	
FBI: Most Wanted	CBS	100th episode	"100%"	March 11	
Grand Ole Opry / Opry Live	NBC	100th anniversary	Opry 100: A Live Celebration	March 19	
Gold Rush	Discovery Channel	400th episode	"Parker Heats Up"	April 11	
Big City Greens	Disney Channel	100th episode	"One Hundred"	May 3	
Mama June: Family Crisis	We TV	100th episode	"The D-Word"	June 13	
Real Time with Bill Maher	HBO	700th episode	"Dave Barry, Paul Begala, Wesley Hunt"	June 20	
AEW Dynamite	TBS	300th episode	"Dynamite 300"	July 2	
AEW Collision	TNT	100th episode	"Collision 100"	July 5	
Robot Chicken	Adult Swim	20th anniversary	The Robot Chicken Self-Discovery Special	July 20	
Beyond the Gates	CBS	100th episode	"7/29/2025"	July 29	
Phineas and Ferb	Disney Channel	150th episode	"The Nightmare-Inator"	August 2	
Phineas and Ferb	Disney Channel	150th episode	"Doof in Retrograde"	August 2	
Bob's Burgers	Fox	300th episode	"'Til Death Do Us Art" (Note: "Grand Pre-Pre-Pre-Opening", which aired on September 28 a week earlier, was publicized as the 300th episode.)	October 5	
Chicago Med	NBC	200th episode	"A Game of Inches"	October 8	
Nova	PBS	1,000th episode	"Humans: Building Empires"	October 15	
The Real Housewives of Salt Lake City	Bravo	100th episode	"Out of Gas"	October 21	
The UnXplained	History Channel	100th episode	"The World's Most Deadliest Assassins"	October 31	
Dancing with the Stars	ABC	20th anniversary	"20th Birthday Party"	November 11	
The Simpsons	Fox	800th episode	"Guess Who's Coming to Skinner" (Note: "Irrational Treasure", which aired on February 15, 2026, was publicized as the 800th episode. The 800th episode in production order, "Extreme Makeover: Homer Edition", aired on June 17, 2026 exclusively on Disney+.)	December 7	
Beavis and Butt-Head	Comedy Central	300th episode	"The Discoverers"	December 10	

=== Shows returning in 2025 ===
Show	Last aired	Type of return	Previous channel	New/returning/same channel	Return date	Source
Extreme Makeover: Home Edition	2020	Revival	HGTV	ABC	January 2	
Hollywood Squares	2004	Revival	Syndication	CBS	January 16	
The Joe Schmo Show	2013	Revival	Spike	TBS	January 21	
Tic-Tac-Dough	1990	Revival	Syndication	Game Show Network	April 14	
Tennis on TNT	2002	Revival	TNT	same	May 25	
Duck Dynasty (as Duck Dynasty: The Revival)	2017	Revival	A&E	same	June 1	
Phineas and Ferb	2015	Revival	Disney Channel/Disney XD	Disney Channel/Disney+	June 5	
NASCAR on TNT	2014	Revival	TNT	TNT/TruTV/Max	June 28	
Mickey Mouse Clubhouse (as Mickey Mouse Clubhouse+)	2016	Reboot	Playhouse Disney/Disney Junior	Disney Jr.	July 21	
Match Game	2021	Revival	ABC	same	July 23	
South Park	2023	New season	Comedy Central	same	July 23	
The Amazing World of Gumball (as The Wonderfully Weird World of Gumball)	2021	Revival	Cartoon Network	Hulu	July 28	
King of the Hill	2010	Revival	Fox	Hulu	August 4	
The Case Against Adnan Syed	2019	Revival	HBO	same	September 18	
Comics Unleashed	2023	Revival	CBS	same	September 22	
Ice Road Truckers	2017	Revival	History Channel	same	October 1	
Reading Rainbow	2006	Revival	PBS	Kidzuko	October 4	
NBA on NBC	2002	Revival	NBC	NBC/Peacock	October 21	

=== Shows ending in 2025 ===
End date	Show	Channel	First aired	Status	Source
January 9	On Call	Amazon Prime Video	2025	Canceled	
January 10	Goosebumps	Disney+/Hulu	2023	Canceled	
January 11	Huckabee	TBN	2008	Ended	
January 14	Baby Shark's Big Show!	Nick Jr.	2020	Ended	
January 23	The Sex Lives of College Girls	Max	2021	Canceled	
January 25	Craig of the Creek	Cartoon Network	2018	Ended	
January 30	Mo	Netflix	2022	Ended	
January 30	The Recruit	Netflix	2022	Canceled	
January 30	Bookie	Max	2023	Canceled	
February 3	9-1-1: Lone Star	Fox	2020	Ended	
February 6	Harlem	Amazon Prime Video	2021	Ended	
February 6	Clean Slate	Amazon Prime Video	2025	Canceled	
February 7	Lopez vs Lopez	NBC	2022	Canceled	
February 7	Andrea Mitchell Reports	MSNBC	2008	Canceled	
February 13	Cobra Kai	Netflix	2018	Ended	
February 14	Dexter: Original Sin	Showtime	2024	Canceled	
February 23	Alex Wagner Tonight	MSNBC	2022	Canceled	
February 24	The ReidOut	MSNBC	2020	Canceled	
March 6	Jellystone!	Max	2021	Ended	
March 6	The Tiny Chef Show	Nickelodeon	2022	Canceled	
March 8	Moon Girl and Devil Dinosaur	Disney Channel	2023	Canceled	
March 13	Christina on the Coast	HGTV	2019	Canceled	
March 20	The Residence	Netflix	2025	Canceled	
March 25	The Irrational	NBC	2023	Canceled	
March 25	Deal or No Deal Island	NBC	2024	Canceled	
March 26	Mythic Quest	Apple TV+	2020	Canceled	
March 28	Mid-Century Modern	Hulu	2025	Canceled	
March 31	Rescue: HI-Surf	Fox	2024	Canceled	
April 3	Pulse	Netflix	2025	Canceled	
April 3	The Bondsman	Amazon Prime Video	2025	Canceled	
April 6	1923	Paramount+	2022	Ended	
April 9	Good Cop/Bad Cop	The CW	2025	Canceled	
April 13	Hamster & Gretel	Disney Channel	2022	Ended	
April 17	The Wheel of Time	Amazon Prime Video	2021	Canceled	
April 17	Bosch: Legacy	Amazon Prime Video	2022	Ended	
April 18	Jane	Apple TV+	2023	Ended	
April 23	The Conners	ABC	2018	Ended	
April 24	You	Netflix	2018	Ended	
April 24	Étoile	Amazon Prime Video	2025	Canceled	
April 25	Mickey Mouse Funhouse	Disney Jr.	2021	Ended	
April 27	Primos	Disney Channel	2024	Ended	
April 28	Poppa's House	CBS	2024	Canceled	
April 30	Tyler Perry's Young Dylan	Nickelodeon	2020	Canceled	
May 1	Happy Face	Paramount+	2025	Canceled	
May 3	StuGo	Disney Channel	2025	Canceled	
May 4	The Righteous Gemstones	HBO	2019	Ended	
May 4	The Equalizer	CBS	2021	Canceled	
May 6	Night Court	NBC	2023	Canceled	
May 8	Blood of Zeus	Netflix	2020	Ended	
May 13	Andor	Disney+	2022	Ended	
May 15	Found	NBC	2023	Canceled	
May 15	Doctor Odyssey	ABC	2024	Canceled	
May 16	S.W.A.T.	CBS	2017	Canceled	
May 16	Grosse Pointe Garden Society	NBC	2025	Canceled	
May 18	Suits LA	NBC	2025	Canceled	
May 20	FBI: Most Wanted	CBS	2020	Canceled	
May 20	FBI: International	CBS	2021	Canceled	
May 20	Motorheads	Amazon Prime Video	2025	Canceled	
May 23	Around the Horn	ESPN	2002	Canceled	
May 23	Big Mouth	Netflix	2017	Ended	
May 23	Kindergarten: The Musical	Disney Jr.	2024	Canceled	
May 27	The Handmaid's Tale	Hulu	2017	Ended	
May 27	Alert: Missing Persons Unit	Fox	2023	Canceled	
May 28	Married to Real Estate	HGTV	2022	Canceled	
May 30	Pictionary	Syndication	2022	Canceled	
May 30	Person, Place or Thing	Syndication	2023	Canceled	
May 31	NBA on TNT	TNT	1989	Ended	
June 3	The Cleaning Lady	Fox	2022	Canceled	
June 5	Leverage: Redemption	Amazon Prime Video	2021	Canceled	
June 12	FUBAR	Netflix	2023	Canceled	
June 12	Law & Order: Organized Crime	Peacock	2021	Canceled	
June 13	After Midnight	CBS	2024	Ended	
June 19	The Waterfront	Netflix	2025	Canceled	
June 25	Raid the Cage	CBS	2023	Canceled	
June 27	Squid Game	Netflix	2021	Ended	
June 30	Yes, Chef!	NBC	2025	Canceled	
July 2	The Ultimatum: Queer Love	Netflix	2023	Canceled	
July 3	Duster	Max	2025	Canceled	
July 10	Poker Face	Peacock	2023	Canceled	
July 11	Speak	Fox Sports 1	2016	Canceled	
July 14	Breakfast Ball	Fox Sports 1	2024	Canceled	
July 15	Rehab Addict	HGTV	2010	Canceled	
July 23	Building the Band	Netflix	2025	Canceled	
July 28	Basketball Wives	VH1	2010	Ended	
July 31	The Sandman	Netflix	2022	Ended	
August 8	Resident Alien	Syfy/USA Network	2021	Canceled	
August 13	Butterfly	Amazon Prime Video	2025	Canceled	
August 14	And Just Like That...	HBO Max	2021	Ended	
August 15	BMF	Starz	2021	Canceled	
August 25	Upload	Amazon Prime Video	2020	Ended	
August 26	The Snake	Fox	2025	Canceled	
August 29	Shape Island	Apple TV	2023	Canceled	
September 1	The Runarounds	Amazon Prime Video	2025	Canceled	
September 3	Countdown	Amazon Prime Video	2025	Canceled	
September 12	Dish Nation	Syndication	2012	Ended	
September 14	The Great North	Fox	2021	Canceled	
September 14	Media Buzz	Fox News Channel	2013	Canceled	
September 17	Acapulco	Apple TV+	2021	Ended	
September 17	The Summer I Turned Pretty	Amazon Prime Video	2022	Ended	
September 18	The Case Against Adnan Syed	HBO	2019	Ended	
September 25	E! News	E!	1991	Canceled	
September 26	English Teacher	FX	2024	Canceled	
October 9	Boots	Netflix	2025	Canceled	
October 13	Solar Opposites	Hulu	2020	Ended	
October 22	Gen V	Amazon Prime Video	2023	Canceled	
October 23	NCIS: Tony & Ziva	Paramount+	2025	Canceled	
October 31	On Brand with Jimmy Fallon	NBC	2025	Canceled	
November 3	Crutch	Paramount+	2025	Canceled	
November 6	The Vince Staples Show	Netflix	2024	Canceled	
November 20	Jurassic World: Chaos Theory	Netflix	2024	Ended	
November 23	Billy the Kid	MGM+	2022	Ended	
November 23	Talamasca: The Secret Order	AMC	2025	Canceled	
November 26	WondLa	Apple TV	2024	Ended	
December 1	Blaze and the Monster Machines	Nickelodeon	2014	Ended	
December 4	Firebuds	Disney Jr.	2022	Ended	
December 4	The Abandons	Netflix	2025	Canceled	
December 5	Transformers: EarthSpark	Nickelodeon/Paramount+	2022	Ended	
December 5	The Last Frontier	Apple TV	2025	Canceled	
December 8	Bel-Air	Peacock	2022	Ended	
December 8	With Love, Meghan	Netflix	2025	Canceled	
December 9	Wipeout	TBS	2021	Canceled	
December 11	Tomb Raider: The Legend of Lara Croft	Netflix	2024	Ended	
December 12	Tales of the Teenage Mutant Ninja Turtles	Paramount+	2024	Canceled	
December 13	The Kitchen	Food Network	2014	Canceled	
December 27	The Copenhagen Test	Peacock	2025	Canceled	
December 31	Stranger Things	Netflix	2016	Ended	

=== Entering syndication in 2025 ===
A list of programs (current or canceled) that have accumulated enough episodes (between 65 and 100) or seasons (three or more) to be eligible for off-network syndication or basic cable runs.

Show	Seasons	In Production	Notes	Source
Tribunal Justice	2	Yes	Broadcast syndication in local markets.	
Ghosts	4	Yes	Broadcast syndication in local markets.	
Fire Country	3	Yes	Broadcast syndication in local markets.	

== Networks and services ==
=== Launches ===
Network	Type	Launch date	Notes	Sources
Game Show Central	Exclusive over-the-air multicast feed	February 17	On February 17, Sony Pictures Television Networks began distributing an over-the-air multicast feed of Game Show Central, a spin-off of Game Show Network carrying archived original programs from the cable channel's library (such as Catch 21, Idiotest, Master Minds, Common Knowledge and Baggage). The network maintains a separate schedule from its namesake ad-supported streaming channel (originally launched in March 2020 and available on AVOD live television platforms such as Pluto TV, Samsung TV+ and The Roku Channel), incorporating recent and older GSN originals not carried on the cable and streaming channels as well as some shared programs. Initially, Game Show Central's OTA feed was available primarily on stations owned by the E. W. Scripps Company and Inyo Broadcast Holdings (many of them Ion affiliates), replacing sister network Get, which served as a placeholder affiliation for subchannels that previously carried Scripps News prior to its conversion into a streaming-only channel in November 2024.	
Busted	Over-the-air multicast	March 1	On January 31, Free TV Networks announced the launch of Busted, a new digital multicast network focused around repeats of law enforcement-related programming from the A+E Global Media library (including series from its various Wars and Cam programs), and selected other distributors including Langley Productions and Fox Entertainment (including series such as World's Wildest Police Videos, Jail and Cops Reloaded).	
Farm Journal TV and Farm Journal Now	Subscription video on demand and free ad-supported streaming	May 2	Farm Journal, the agriculture publisher and broadcast syndicator that produces the programs AgDay, U.S. Farm Report and Machinery Pete, launched a two-pronged Internet service in the spring, first launching its paid on-demand service Farm Journal TV in March, then launching its free linear feed Farm Journal Now on May 2. As part of the transition, Farm Journal disaffiliated from its longtime cable partner RFD-TV on April 27.	
Mississippi Live Weather	OTT streaming	July 2	On July 2, Matt Laubhan (former chief meteorologist at NBC/ABC affiliate WTVA/Tupelo who departed on June 30 with little fanfare) launched Mississippi Live Weather, a 24-hour regional streaming network serving Northeast Mississippi, offering live forecast segments (airing up to five times per day), severe weather coverage, and continuous automated loops of current conditions and forecast maps. The launch of the service, initially presented by Laubhan and Gabe Mahner (who also left WTVA shortly after the network's launch), occurred five months after Allen Media Group partially canceled plans to outsource weather coverage at its stations (including WTVA) to a production hub at The Weather Channel's Atlanta studios. Mississippi Live Weather (an affiliate of the Lawrenceburg, Tennessee-based National Weather Network, a digital weather service cooperative that launched on January 19 with six charter affiliates, including locally based flagship Tennessee Valley Weather) is available as a live feed on its website; iOS, Android and Smart TV apps; and YouTube channel, in addition to ancillary content on various social media platforms (such as YouTube, X, Facebook and TikTok).	
MovieSphere Gold	Over-the-air multicast	August 1	On July 21, Lionsgate announced that it would launch MovieSphere Gold, an over-the-air digital multicast extension of its free ad-supported streaming movie channel MovieSphere featuring theatrical films from the studio's library. The network was initially available primarily on stations owned by TelevisaUnivision and HC2 Holdings, among other groups.	
Alabama Weather Network	OTT streaming	August 11	On July 14, WBMA/Birmingham chief meteorologist James Spann (who has been with the ABC affiliate since its September 1996 launch) announced the launch of the Alabama Weather Network, a 24-hour streaming weather network, owned in part by Spann and managing meteorologist Bill Murray (formerly of WBMG and WVTM), that features live forecasts, severe weather coverage and taped event and tourism segments, as well as routine and speciality forecasts and automated loops of current conditions. (The network's coverage area, which encompasses all 67 Alabama counties, overlaps with Tennessee Valley Weather, which includes most of the Huntsville–Decatur market in its coverage area.) Spann will continue at WBMA, in addition to the new venture, doing weather segments for its early weeknight newscasts and pervading severe weather coverage. The Alabama Weather Network is available as a live feed through its website; iOS, Android and Smart TV apps; and YouTube channel, in addition to ancillary content on various social media platforms.	
ESPN (streaming service)	OTT streaming	August 21	First reported as being developed in early 2023 (under the code name "Flagship"), ESPN parent company The Walt Disney Company confirmed in February 2024 its plans for its own direct-to-consumer streaming service, and in May 2025 indicated it would be simply called "ESPN". The service, whose launch date was confirmed by Disney on August 6, grants its subscribers access to all programming seen on ESPN's linear cable channels, as well as all ESPN Select content, along with WWE's premium live events, with most existing pay television subscribers using TV Everywhere credentials able to access the broader service at no additional cost.	
Fox One	OTT streaming	August 21	Fox One encompasses all of Fox Corporation's cable channels as a $19.99/month service (excluding Fox Soccer Plus), with access to Fox Nation for an additional fee; as with ESPN's new service, pay television subscribers are able to access the service with TV Everywhere credentials for no additional cost.	
WEST	Over-the-air multicast	September 29	On June 17, Weigel Broadcasting announced it would launch WEST (a backronym for "Western Entertainment Series Television"), the company's tenth multicast network, which features classic western television series from the 1950s to the 1970s, including shows that Weigel holds contractual rights to air on sister networks MeTV and Heroes & Icons, as well as those held by MeTV+ up until WEST's launch, as part of their dedicated western blocks (such as Gunsmoke, Bonanza, Rawhide, Have Gun, Will Travel, The Big Valley and Wild Wild West). It was originally scheduled to launch on September 1, but was delayed to sometime later that month. On September 18, Weigel announced that the network would launch on September 29.	
NBC Sports Network	Cable/satellite	November 17 (YouTube TV)	On July 23, The Wall Street Journal reported that NBCUniversal was considering launching a new national linear sports network that would primarily offer sporting events to which Peacock holds exclusive streaming rights. The proposed network, which was being planned amid the company's pending spin-off of most of its cable networks (except for Bravo) into the separate media company Versant as well as NBC Sports' acquisition of NBA broadcast and streaming rights effective that fall, was initially reported to be sold exclusively to "specific cable packages" as opposed to being more widely distributed so as to not cannibalize Peacock. On October 2, as part of a new long-term carriage agreement between NBCUniversal and YouTube TV, the company formally announced that it would launch a new iteration of NBC Sports Network (the original incarnation of which launched as Outdoor Life Network in July 1995, and operated as a general sports network under the successor Versus and NBCSN identities from September 2006 until the channel's shutdown in December 2021), which would be carried by the vMVPD streaming provider under the agreement.	
Arkansas Weather Network	OTT streaming	December 13	On December 3, James Bryant (former weekend meteorologist at KATV/Little Rock who departed from the Sinclair-owned ABC affiliate on November 30) and storm chaser-turned-digital forecaster Zachary Hall (who previously freelanced for Nexstar-operated NBC and Fox affiliates KNWA–KFTA/Rogers–Fort Smith) announced the launch of the Arkansas Weather Network, a 24-hour streaming weather network serving the state's 75 counties, which features live forecasts and severe weather coverage as well as automated loops of current conditions, forecast maps, and routine and speciality forecasts. (The network's coverage area partially overlaps with Joplin-based Doug Heady Weather, an upstart digital weather company founded by the former KOAM-TV chief meteorologist set to formally launch by the start of 2026, which includes Benton County in its coverage area.) The Arkansas Weather Network (an affiliate of the National Weather Network) is available as a live feed through its website; iOS, Android and Smart TV apps; and YouTube channel, in addition to ancillary content on various social media platforms.	

=== Conversions and rebrandings ===
Old network name	New network name	Type	Conversion date	Notes	Source
The365	365BLK	Over-the-air multicast	January 1	The Free TV Networks-owned multicast network aimed at black audiences rebrands from The365 to 365BLK on its first anniversary to clarify its target audience within its branding; outside a temporary removal of some overnight programming with paid programming (a change reverted on April 1), no other changes to the network's schedule occur.	
MAVTV	Racer Network	Cable/satellite	March 27	MAVTV, a network devoted to motorsports and other automotive content and formerly owned by Lucas Oil, is sold to Racer Media & Marketing, the publisher of Racer and is immediately rebranded the same day to take advantage of Racer's complementary branding, ending 20 years of existence under its original MAVTV monicker, which dated back to an era when the channel was focused on men's content rather than exclusively motorsports. The channel's companion FAST service is correspondingly renamed Racer Select.	
TBD	Roar	Over-the-air multicast	April 28	On March 3, Sinclair Broadcast Group announced it would rebrand TBD, which originally launched in February 2017, with a format centered on original web content, as Roar (as in "roaring with laughter") to reflect the network's shift in focus since early 2024, from millennial-targeted reality programming and adapted online content to alternative comedy shows (encompassing unscripted and sketch series such as Saturday Night Live).	
Max	HBO Max	Over-the-top streaming service	July 9	On May 14, Warner Bros. Discovery announced plans to revert Max's name to its original from 2020 to 2023; on July 8, it indicated that the rebrand would occur the next day.	
HBO2	HBO Hits	Cable/satellite	September 4	Three weeks after shutting down four of the channels in its HBO/Cinemax multiplex suite (see "Closures" section), Warner Bros. Discovery rebrands six of the remaining networks, secondary channels HBO2 and MoreMax (both launched in 1991) as HBO Hits and Cinemax Hits, respectively; HBO Signature (originally launched as HBO3 in 1991, and relaunched as a female-targeted service in 1998) as HBO Drama; HBO Zone (originally launched as a young adult-targeted service in 2001) as the general film service HBO Movies; ActionMax (action/adventure movies; launched in 1998) as Cinemax Action; and 5StarMax (classic and critically acclaimed movies; launched in 2001) as Cinemax Classics, to either reflect their corresponding genre formats or, in the case of the "MAX" channels, better align with their parent network (and effectively further distinguish those channels from co-owned streaming service HBO Max).	(Note: Prior to the brand being used by the former HBO2 in America, HBO Hits was launched by Home Box Office, Inc.'s HBO Asia unit in 2006 as a multiplex channel serving most of Southeast Asia (except Malaysia and Brunei, which would not receive the service until 2021); a regional feed of the channel also operated in India from 2013 to 2016.) (Note: Cinemax had formally used the "Max" brand as a shorthand name from 1985 until HBO Max launched in May 2020. ("MAX", sometimes modified as "CMAX" to distinguish it from HBO Max, remains in use as Cinemax's identifier code on most television listings providers.))
HBO Signature	HBO Drama	Cable/satellite	September 4		
HBO Zone	HBO Movies	Cable/satellite	September 4		
MoreMAX	Cinemax Hits	Cable/satellite	September 4		
ActionMAX	Cinemax Action	Cable/satellite	September 4		
5starMAX	Cinemax Classics	Cable/satellite	September 4		
Apple TV+	Apple TV	Over-the-top streaming service	October 13	On October 13, Apple Inc. announced during a press release for the film F1 that it had rebranded its streaming service to simply "Apple TV" (which shares the name of the company's connected television device and app) removing the "+" from its name.	
MSNBC	MS NOW	Cable/satellite	November 15	In November 2024, Comcast announced that ownership of MSNBC and several of its other cable networks would be spun off to a new company controlled by its shareholders, Versant. In August 2025, it was announced that the network would be renamed as MS NOW (an acronym for "My Source [for] News, Opinion, [and the] World") as part of a major rebranding which would also separate the network's operations from NBC News and remove that network's Peacock logo from its separated properties (including CNBC, which currently retains its name) The process of separation of NBC News on the channel began in October, and it was announced on October 27, that the rebrand to MS NOW would occur on November 15.	
Arkansas PBS	Arkansas TV	Over-the-air state network	December 12	On December 11, the Arkansas Educational Television Commission, operators of the statewide network Arkansas PBS, voted to disaffiliate from PBS effective July 1, 2026, (the start of its 2027 fiscal year) and become an independent educational network due to federal cuts to the Corporation for Public Broadcasting (see 7/17 entry). In concert with the move, the network rebrands one day later to Arkansas TV.	

=== Closures ===
Network/ service	Type	End date	Notes	Source
Smile	Over-the-air multicast	January 12	The free-to-air, faith-based children's network owned by the Trinity Broadcasting Network closes on this date; its shutdown comes after its cable carriage was discontinued by Olympusat in February 2021, and promos announcing the network's closure began airing in December 2024. Most of Smile's programming was moved to Yippee TV and TBN's streaming service TBN+.	
Universal Kids	Cable/satellite	March 6	NBCUniversal confirmed the shutdown of Universal Kids on January 13, after several pay television providers indicated in notices to customers several days before that the service would close on March 6. The network had already become a low priority with the sharp declines in ratings for children's television networks in the age of streaming, and comes months after Comcast announced its intent to spin-off most of NBCUniversal's cable properties (except for Bravo) into a separate company controlled by its shareholders named Versant, which made no mention of Universal Kids's fate before then.	
TV8 Vail	Over-the-air broadcast, streaming	March 28	TV8 Vail was the second and last of two independent over-the-air translators operated by Deerfield Media, which otherwise operates as a sidecar company with Sinclair Broadcast Group. (The other, Park City Television, shut down in 2022.) Deerfield had purchased the low-power television license from Vail Resorts in 2021, after that company had shut the station down in 2019, deeming it a non-critical service in its efforts to acquire resorts outside Colorado.	
ShopHQ	Cable/satellite, streaming	April 17	The Eden Prairie, Minnesota-based home shopping network abruptly went off the air at midday on this date; several days later, parent company IV Media, LLC filed a WARN notice alerting the Minnesota Department of Employment and Economic Development that it would end Eden Prairie operations by the end of June. ShopHQ went through multiple owners (most recently Manoj Bhargava), identities, and struggles since launching in 1991; from January (when it laid off 128 workers), the channel began a purposeful discontinuation of cable and satellite carriage in an effort to move to mostly online platforms (such as YouTube, TikTok, Instagram). ShopHQ's sudden closure came after Bhargava's other over-the-air networks, NewsNet and Sports News Highlights, suffered similar closures in August 2024. ShopHQ would re-launch online on October 20, this time under the management of The Arena Group, a company also majority-owned by Bhargarva which acquired the ShopHQ intellectual property.	
HBO Family	Cable/satellite, streaming	August 15	On June 13, Warner Bros. Discovery announced that it would shut down four of HBO and Cinemax's multiplex channels: HBO Family (family-oriented movies, specials and, until 2024, original and library HBO children's programs; launched in 1996), MovieMax (general film service; replaced female-targeted wMax in 2013), OuterMax (sci-fi/fantasy movies; launched in 2001) and ThrillerMax (suspense/horror movies; launched in 1998) effective August 15. The announcement occurred four days after WBD revealed it would spin off most of its pay television networks (except for the Home Box Office, Inc. unit) into a separate company, and followed sister streaming service Max reducing its investment in children's series domestically earlier in the year. Max had also excluded HBO Family (along with the Spanish-language HBO Latino) from the linear HBO feeds offered on its "Channels" section that was introduced in December 2024. The four services are the first multiplex channels operated by one of the four main American premium cable network operators (HBO, Showtime Networks, Starz Entertainment and MGMPlus Entertainment) to fully shut down.	
MovieMax	Cable/satellite, streaming	August 15		
OuterMax	Cable/satellite, streaming	August 15		
ThrillerMax	Cable/satellite, streaming	August 15		
Amazon Freevee	OTT streaming	September 3	After previously denying it would do so, Amazon announced on November 12, 2024, that it would begin the discontinuation of their standalone Freevee service, which launched in 2019 as IMDb TV before rebranding as Freevee in 2022. On July 2, Amazon notified users that the Freevee app would be inaccessible starting in August, before eventually shutting down on September 3. Freevee's content is already found on the ad-supported, free-to-access tier of Amazon's Prime Video.	
ESPN3	OTT streaming	December 2	ESPN3, which launched as ESPN360 in 2005, quietly shut down on December 2, 2025. The IP address-restricted service was already obsolete by the time of the closure and had largely served only as the online outlet for panorama coverage of events carried on ABC or ESPN's linear networks and sports content produced by ESPN for Disney-owned networks that did not have their own platform, such as ABC and FX. All of the remaining content had been migrated to ESPN+ and ESPN's direct-to-consumer streaming service by the time of the closure.	

== Television stations ==
=== Station launches ===
Date	Market	Station	Channel	Affiliation	Notes	Source
July 22	Syracuse, New York	WKOF	15.1	Roar → CBS	Sinclair Broadcast Group launched WKOF for the eventual housing of the intellectual properties of WTVH, Syracuse's longtime CBS affiliate. WSTM, Sinclair's main Syracuse property, has operated WTVH since 2009, on behalf of its owner Granite Broadcasting, which had sold all of its other television stations by 2018. WKOF began carrying WTVH's programming on December 1, continuing to brand the station as "CBS 5"; Roar subsequently moved to WTVH.	

=== Subchannel launches ===
Date	Market	Station	Channel	Affiliation	Notes	Source
January 2	Portland, Oregon	KRCW-TV	32.4	Shop LC		
January 2	Sacramento, California	KSAO-LD	49.13	National Black Television (NBT)		
January 7	Grand Junction, Colorado	KLML	20.7	JTV Español		
January 7	Grand Junction, Colorado	KLML	20.8	Story Television		
January 7	Grand Junction, Colorado	KLML	20.14	Jewelry Television		
January 8	Bristol, Virginia– Johnson City, Tennessee	WCYB-TV	5.5	Rewind TV		
February 9	Los Angeles, California	KFLA-LD	8.15	beIN Sports Xtra en Español		
February 9	Sacramento, California	KSAO-LD	49.14	beIN Sports Xtra en Español		
February 14	Anchorage, Alaska	KTVA	11.2	Create	See KTVA entry in Stations changing network affiliations	
February 14	Anchorage, Alaska	KTVA	11.3	360 North	See KTVA entry in Stations changing network affiliations	
February 14	Anchorage, Alaska	KTVA	11.4	PBS Kids	See KTVA entry in Stations changing network affiliations	
March 1	Brunswick, Georgia– Jacksonville, Florida	WPXC-TV	21.7	Busted	See Busted entry in launches	
March 1	Champaign, Illinois	WCQA-LD	16.3	Busted	See Busted entry in launches	
March 1	Champaign, Illinois	WEAE-LD	21.5	Busted	See Busted entry in launches	
March 1	Charleston, South Carolina	WBSE-LD	20.8	Busted	See Busted entry in launches	
March 1	Chattanooga, Tennessee	WYHB-CD	39.10	Busted	See Busted entry in launches	
March 1	Evansville, Indiana	WELW-LD	30.6	Busted	See Busted entry in launches	
March 1	Evansville, Indiana	WEIN-LD	40.6	Busted	See Busted entry in launches	
March 1	Florence–Myrtle Beach, South Carolina	W33DN-D	16.5	Busted	See Busted entry in launches	
March 1	Great Falls, Montana	KTGF-LD	50.5	Busted	See Busted entry in launches	
March 1	Honolulu, Hawaii	KPXO-TV	66.5	Busted	See Busted entry in launches	
March 1	Kennewick, Washington	K28QK-D	22.7	Busted	See Busted entry in launches	
March 1	Kennewick, Washington	K33EJ-D	33.4	Busted	See Busted entry in launches	
March 1	Lincoln–Grand Island, Nebraska	KIUA-LD	15.7	Busted	See Busted entry in launches	
March 1	Montgomery, Alabama	WCOV-TV	20.4	Busted	See Busted entry in launches	
March 1	Omaha, Nebraska	KQMK-LD	25.5	Busted	See Busted entry in launches	
March 1	Rochester, New York	WGCE-CD	6.7	Busted	See Busted entry in launches	
March 1	St. Louis, Missouri	W29CI-D	29.6	Busted	See Busted entry in launches	
March 1	Savannah, Georgia	WUET-LD	43.7	Busted	See Busted entry in launches	
March 3	Honolulu, Hawaii	KHII-TV	9.2	Rewind TV		
March 3	Honolulu, Hawaii	KHNL	13.5	Quest		
March 3	Honolulu, Hawaii	KHNL	13.7	Defy		
March 9	Sacramento, California	KSAO-LD	49.15	Outdoor America		
March 14	Tupelo, Mississippi	WTVA	9.5	Antenna TV		
March 27	Cleveland, Ohio	WOCV-CD	35.4	Movies!		
March 27	Cleveland, Ohio	WOCV-CD	35.5	Dabl		
April 1	Shawano–Green Bay–Fox Cities, Wisconsin	WMEI	31.7	Catchy Comedy		
May 7	Bloomington–Indianapolis, Indiana	WTTV	4.5	Rewind TV		
May 19	Harlingen, Texas	KFXV	60.2	Milenio TV		
June 19	Madison, Wisconsin	WMSN-TV	47.5	The Nest		
June 19	Madison, Wisconsin	WMSN-TV	47.6	Rewind TV		
June 27	Tulsa, Oklahoma	KTUL	8.6	The Nest		
June 27	Tulsa, Oklahoma	KTUL	8.7	Rewind TV		
June 28	Anchorage, Alaska	KDMD	33.10	Z Living		
July 2	Cape Girardeau, Missouri	KFVS-TV	12.7	365BLK		
July 2	Jefferson City–Columbia, Missouri	KRCG	13.5	The Nest		
July 7	Kirksville, Missouri–Ottumwa, Iowa	KTVO	3.4	Charge!		
July 7	Rochester, New York	WHAM-TV	13.4	The Nest		
July 10	Cheboygan–Traverse City, Michigan	WPBN-TV	7.4	The Nest		
July 10	Johnstown, Pennsylvania	WJAC-TV	6.5	The Nest		
July 10	Savannah, Georgia	WTGS	28.6	The Nest		
July 10	Savannah, Georgia	WTGS	28.7	Rewind TV		
July 21	St. George, Utah	KCSG	8.9	Dabl		
July 21	Nashville, Tennessee	WJFB	44.9	Dabl		
July 21	Hayes Center, Nebraska	KWNB-TV	6.4	Charge!		
July 21	North Platte, Nebraska	KHGI-CD	27.3	Charge!		
July 24	Indianapolis, Indiana	WJSJ-CD	51.2	MeTV Toons		
August 1	Shawano–Green Bay–Fox Cities, Wisconsin	WMEI	31.8	Dabl		
August 1	Albuquerque–Santa Fe, New Mexico	KLUZ-TV	14.8	MovieSphere Gold		
August 1	Austin, Texas	KAKW-DT	62.8	MovieSphere Gold		
August 1	Austin, Texas	KTFO-CD	31.8	MovieSphere Gold		
August 1	Bakersfield, California	KUVI-DT	45.8	MovieSphere Gold		
August 1	Bangor, Maine	WVII-TV	7.3	MovieSphere Gold		
August 1	Beaumont, Texas	KUMJ-LD	23.3	MovieSphere Gold		
August 1	Cleveland, Ohio	WQHS-DT	61.8	MovieSphere Gold		
August 1	Eugene, Oregon	KORY-CD	15.8	MovieSphere Gold		
August 1	Greensboro, North Carolina	WGSR-LD	19.3	MovieSphere Gold		
August 1	Lexington, Kentucky	WBON-LD	9.5	MovieSphere Gold		
August 1	Norfolk, Virginia	WSKY-TV	4.7	MovieSphere Gold		
August 1	Panama City, Florida	WPFN-CD	22.7	MovieSphere Gold		
August 1	Phoenix, Arizona	KTVW-DT	33.7	MovieSphere Gold		
August 1	Roanoke, Virginia	WMDV-LD	23.2	MovieSphere Gold		
August 1	Roanoke, Virginia	WYAT-LD	40.2	MovieSphere Gold		
August 1	Springfield, Illinois	WCQA-LD	16.11	MovieSphere Gold		
August 1	Stockton–Sacramento–Modesto, California	KTFK-DT	64.7	MovieSphere Gold		
August 1	Tulsa, Oklahoma	KQCW-DT	19.2	MovieSphere Gold		
August 1	Traverse City–Cadillac, Michigan	W36FH-D	36.8	MovieSphere Gold		
August 1	Washington, D.C.	WRZB-LD	31.3	MovieSphere Gold		
August 4	Miami, Florida	WSVN	7.4	Defy	See WSVN and WPLG entries in Stations changing network affiliations	
September 25	Mobile, Alabama	WALA-TV	10.7	MeTV		
September 29	Green Bay, Wisconsin	WMEI	31.9	MeTV+		
September 29	Nashville, Tennessee	WJFB	44.10	MeTV+		
September 29	St. George, Utah	KCSG	8.10	MeTV+		
September 29	St. Louis, Missouri	KNLC	24.10	MeTV+		
September 29	Chicago, Illinois	WCIU-TV	26.8	WEST	See WEST entry in Launches	
September 29	Cleveland, Ohio	WOCV-CD	35.6	WEST	See WEST entry in Launches	
September 29	Denver, Colorado	KREG-TV	3.9	WEST	See WEST entry in Launches	
September 29	Des Moines, Iowa	KDIT-CD	45.5	WEST	See WEST entry in Launches	
September 29	Evansville, Indiana	WZDS-LD	5.7	WEST	See WEST entry in Launches	
September 29	Hartford–New Haven, Connecticut	WHCT-LD	35.10	WEST	See WEST entry in Launches	
September 29	Houston, Texas	KYAZ	51.5	WEST	See WEST entry in Launches	
September 29	Indianapolis, Indiana	WJSJ-CD	51.3	WEST	See WEST entry in Launches	
September 29	Little Rock, Arkansas	KKME-LD	3.6	WEST	See WEST entry in Launches	
September 29	Los Angeles, California	KAZA-TV	54.4	WEST	See WEST entry in Launches	
September 29	Phoenix, Arizona	KEJR-LD	40.5	WEST	See WEST entry in Launches	
September 29	San Francisco, California	KTLN-TV	68.7	WEST	See WEST entry in Launches	
September 29	Seattle–Tacoma, Washington	KFFV	44.8	WEST	See WEST entry in Launches	
September 29	South Bend, Indiana	WCWW-LD	25.6	WEST	See WEST entry in Launches	
September 29	Washington, D.C.	WDME-CD	48.7	WEST	See WEST entry in Launches	
September 29	Peoria, Illinois	WHOI	19.5	Roar		
September 29	Peoria, Illinois	WHOI	19.6	MeTV		
December 1	Reno, Nevada	KRNV-DT	4.4	Rewind TV		
December 8	Greeneville–Bristol–Johnson City–Kingsport, Tennessee–Bristol, Virginia	WEMT	39.5	True Crime Network		
December 8	Greeneville–Bristol–Johnson City–Kingsport, Tennessee–Bristol, Virginia	WEMT	39.6	Rewind TV		
December 10	Bay City–Flint–Saginaw–Midland, Michigan	WBSF	46.3	Antenna TV		
December 10	Gainesville, Florida	WNBW-DT	9.5	The Nest		

=== Stations changing network affiliations ===
Date	Market	Station	Channel	Prior affiliation	New affiliation	Notes	Source
January 6	Los Angeles, California	KWHY-TV → KSCN-TV	22.1	Independent Spanish language programming	Scientology Network	The station's then-owner, Meruelo Media, which has been struggling and selling off its assets in the last year, announced the sale of KWHY-TV to Sunset Boulevard Broadcasting, the broadcast arm of the Church of Scientology, on July 29, 2024, for $30 million. On December 16, 2024, Sunset Boulevard Broadcasting filed to change the station's call letters to KSCN-TV, and on January 6, 2025, KWHY-TV's 35-year service as a mainly Spanish-language station ended as the station began simulcasting the Scientology Network full-time, along with the KWHY-TV callsign, which had been in use for nearly 60 years, also being changed to KSCN-TV. All other subchannels were discontinued, though Merulo continues to maintain a channel sharing agreement for Garden Grove-licensed KBEH, which it retained. The sale was completed on January 6, 2025, with KBEH itself subsuming the KWHY call letters (without a "-TV" suffix) on February 2.	
February 14	Anchorage, Alaska	KTVA	11.1	Rewind TV	PBS (as satellite of KAKM)	In October 2024, GCI filed to sell the station to Alaska Public Media, operator of Anchorage PBS station KAKM. Alaska Public Media plans to run KTVA as a straight repeater of KAKM. Management cited GCI's plans to shut down its cable television systems in 2025, potentially increasing dependence on broadcast TV in the area. KTVA's centrally located tower provides better coverage of Anchorage than the more distant and partially terrain shielded Knik TV Mast; Alaska Public Media estimated 86,000 households in Anchorage would see an improved signal.	
April 17	Cadillac–Traverse City, Michigan	WMNN-LD	26.1	ShopHQ	Binge TV	See ShopHQ entry in Closures	
June 30	New Orleans, Louisiana	WTNO-CD	22.1	Infomercials	Fubo Sports Network		
July 1	Tampa-St. Petersburg, Florida	WXPX-TV	66.1	Ion Television	Independent	Parent company E. W. Scripps announced on May 14 that WXPX-TV would become a companion independent station alongside ABC affiliate WFTS ahead of it becoming the new local home of the NHL's Tampa Bay Lightning (see 5/14 entry), including additional newscasts from WFTS.	
July 31	Dallas–Fort Worth, Texas	KAZD	55.1	Simulcast of Spectrum News 1	MeTV+		
August 1	Nashville, Tennessee	WNAB	58.1	Dabl	Roar		
August 1	Amarillo, Texas	KAUO-LD	15.1	Infomercials	MovieSphere Gold		
August 1	Amarillo, Texas	KLKW-LD	22.1	Estrella TV	MovieSphere Gold		
August 1	Charleston, West Virginia	WOCW-LD	21.1	Salem News Channel	MovieSphere Gold		
August 1	Corpus Christi, Texas	KYDF-LD	34.1	ShopHQ	MovieSphere Gold		
August 1	Evansville, Indiana	WDLH-LD	24.1	Infomercials	MovieSphere Gold		
August 1	Evansville, Indiana	WELW-LD	30.1	Salem News Channel	MovieSphere Gold		
August 1	Greenville, North Carolina	W35DW-D	45.1	Infomercials	MovieSphere Gold		
August 1	Indianapolis, Indiana	WSDI-LD	32.1	Consumer Response Television	MovieSphere Gold		
August 1	Indianapolis, Indiana	WQDE-LD	33.1	Timeless TV	MovieSphere Gold		
August 1	Jacksonville, Florida	WRCZ-LD	35.1	Informercials	MovieSphere Gold		
August 1	Kansas City, Missouri	KAJF-LD	21.1	Law & Crime	MovieSphere Gold		
August 1	Kansas City, Missouri	KCMN-LD	41.1	The First TV	MovieSphere Gold		
August 1	Kansas City, Missouri	KQML-LD	46.1	Infomercials	MovieSphere Gold		
August 1	Las Vegas, Nevada	KHDF-CD	19.1	Infomercials	MovieSphere Gold		
August 1	Las Vegas, Nevada	KNBX-CD	31.1	Infomercials	MovieSphere Gold		
August 1	Lubbock, Texas	KNKC-LD	29.1	Fubo Sports Network	MovieSphere Gold		
August 1	Macon, Georgia	WJDO-LD	44.1	The First TV	MovieSphere Gold		
August 1	Minneapolis–St. Paul, Minnesota	KWJM-LD	15.1	Infomercials	MovieSphere Gold		
August 1	Minneapolis–St. Paul, Minnesota	KMBD-LD	43.1	Infomercials	MovieSphere Gold		
August 1	Montgomery, Alabama	WDSF-LD	19.1	Infomercials	MovieSphere Gold		
August 1	Montgomery, Alabama	WQAP-LD	36.1	Infomercials	MovieSphere Gold		
August 1	Nashville, Tennessee	WKUW-LD	40.1	Law & Crime	MovieSphere Gold		
August 1	Omaha, Nebraska	KQMK-LD	25.1	The First TV	MovieSphere Gold		
August 1	Pittsburgh, Pennsylvania	WPTG-CD	69.1	Rewind TV	MovieSphere Gold		
August 1	Portland, Oregon	KOXI-CD	20.1	Salem News Channel	MovieSphere Gold		
August 1	St. Louis, Missouri	KPTN-LD	7.1	HSN	MovieSphere Gold		
August 1	San Diego, California	KSKT-CD	43.1	Infomercials	MovieSphere Gold		
August 1	San Luis Obispo, California	KDFS-CD	30.1	—N/a	MovieSphere Gold		
August 1	Santa Barbara, California	KVMM-CD	41.1	Infomercials	MovieSphere Gold		
August 1	Tyler, Texas	KBJE-LD	29.1	Shop LC	MovieSphere Gold		
August 1	Tyler, Texas	KKPD-LD	30.1	QVC2	MovieSphere Gold		
August 2	Dayton, Ohio	WRGT-TV	45.1	Dabl	Roar		
August 2	Port Arthur–Beaumont, Texas	KBTV-TV	4.1	Dabl	Roar		
August 2	Sioux City, Iowa	KMEG	14.1	Dabl	Roar		
August 4	Miami–Fort Lauderdale, Florida	WPLG	10.1	ABC	Independent	On March 20, BH Media announced it WPLG would disaffiliate with ABC after 69 years, after both parties were unable to agree on reverse compensation terms during contract renewal negotiations, with station management claiming the fee increase requested by ABC parent Disney would have forced WPLG to reduce staff in order to remain profitable. Locally based Sunbeam Television subsequently announced an agreement with Disney to move the ABC affiliation to WSVN-DT2 effective August 4. (Fox programming continues to air on WSVN's primary channel.) On that date, WPLG became an independent station with an expanded local news schedule, similar to the model pioneered by WSVN after its 1989 switch from NBC to Fox (part of a broader three-station affiliation switch through which WPLG was the only major-network outlet in Miami not to change networks), and implemented by Jacksonville sister station WJXT (whose owner, Graham Media Group, operates WPLG under a time brokerage agreement and previously owned the station from 1969 to 2014) when it disaffiliated from CBS in a similar dispute in 2002; WSVN-DT2, meanwhile, began simulcasting most of its parent station's newscasts (except those airing against ABC prime time and news programs). ABC's move to WSVN made Miami–Fort Lauderdale the largest American television market, and the first top 30 market, with a Big Four network affiliate on a subchannel or low-power station. Sunbeam also entered into a time brokerage agreement with WDFL-LD to relay WSVN-DT2's ABC programming over its main channel, mainly to exploit its over-the-air channel 18 as the designated channel position for the ABC feed (branded as "ABC Miami 18") on area pay television systems, and chose to terminate WSVN's ATSC 1.0 hosting role for WPLG's stations on the same date (WPLG serves as a ATSC 3.0 lighthouse station) to accommodate full-bandwidth high definition channels for Fox and ABC programming in the ATSC 1.0 format.	(Note: Since the major broadcast networks switched from the previous model of paying affiliates to carry their programming in the early 2000s, reverse compensation fees (in which station owners pay a percentage of their retransmission payments from pay television providers to their networks, intended mainly to fund network program development) have steadily increased over time, even as pay television subscribers have declined in recent years. This has led to questions over the continued feasibility of reverse compensation, as fees have risen to where some stations (primarily Fox and CBS affiliates) have paid more in network fees than they receive from television providers.)
August 4	Miami–Fort Lauderdale, Florida	WDFL-LD	18.1	Infomercials	ABC		(Note: Prior to this switch, WBMA-LD/Birmingham, Alabama (affiliated with ABC since 1996) was the largest subchannel or low-power Big Four network affiliate by market size. Since 2014, WBMA-LD's programming has been relayed on subchannels of WABM/Birmingham, WDBB/Tuscaloosa (both sister stations of WBMA) and former satellite WGWW/Anniston.)
August 4	Florence, South Carolina	WWMB	21.1	Dabl	Roar		
August 4	Kerrville–San Antonio, Texas	KMYS	35.1	Dabl	Roar		
August 6	Anderson, South Carolina	WMYA-TV	40.1	Dabl	Roar		
August 8	Cedar Rapids, Iowa	KFXA	28.1	Dabl	Roar		
August 11	Yuma, Arizona	KBFY-LD	41.1	Blank	MoviesSphere Gold		
August 13	Wichita, Kansas	KMTW	36.1	Dabl	Roar		
August 16	Atlanta, Georgia	WANF	46.1	CBS	Independent	CBS announced on June 2 that its Atlanta owned-and-operated station WUPA would become the market's CBS affiliate effective August 16, ending both the network's affiliation with Gray Media-owned WANF-TV after 31 years and WUPA's two-year status as an independent station (it disaffiliated from The CW in 2023, with that network moving to WANF sister WPCH-TV). On that date, WANF reverted to independent status (which it had been previously from its 1971 founding until it joined CBS in December 1994, amid an affiliation switch that saw longtime affiliate WAGA-TV join Fox), and expanded its local news and sports content to fill timeslots previously filled by CBS programming after the disaffiliation. WUPA, meanwhile, began airing weather updates during CBS Mornings on August 18, ahead of the launch of a full in-house news department on September 15.	
August 16	Atlanta, Georgia	WUPA	69.1	Independent	CBS		
September 1	Cleveland, Ohio	WUAB	43.1	The CW	MyNetworkTV	On October 28, 2024, Nexstar Media Group announced it would purchase WBNX-TV from Ernest Angley Ministries and form a duopoly with its Fox affiliate WJW. In its announcement, Nexstar indicated it would move The CW affiliation back to WBNX, which carried the network from 2006 to 2018. WUAB replaced The CW with MyNetworkTV (which it originally carried from 2006 to 2018 and has remained as a late night offering since then on sister station WOIO's MeTV subchannel) as well as an expanded sports programming slate. The deal closed on February 1, 2025, with Nexstar taking operational control soon after. As part of the affiliation agreement, Nexstar also indicated that it would move The CW affiliation in the Charlotte market from WCCB to WMYT, which is part of a duopoly with Fox affiliate WJZY (which had aired The CW from 2006 until it became a Fox owned-and-operated station in 2013).	
September 1	Cleveland, Ohio	WBNX-TV	55.1	Independent	The CW		
September 1	Charlotte, North Carolina	WCCB	18.1	The CW	Independent		
September 1	Charlotte, North Carolina	WMYT-TV	55.1	MyNetworkTV	The CW		
September 29	Dallas–Fort Worth, Texas	KAZD	55.1	MeTV+	WEST	See WEST entry in Launches	
September 29	Peoria, Illinois	WHOI	19.1	Roar	MyNetworkTV	On September 19, 2025, WEEK-TV (sister station of WHOI) announced the station would originate its own programming schedule for the first time since 2016, when its ABC affiliation moved to WEEK-DT2; the station had carried the digital multicast networks of its owner before 2025, Sinclair Broadcasting Group, including Comet and Roar (formerly TBD) on its primary channel before Gray Media exchanged South Bend station WSJV for WHOI in mid-2025. WHOI carries MyNetworkTV programming in primetime, along with other sports programming from Gray's St. Louis-based Matrix Midwest, high school and college sports, and extended news programming, in addition to traditional programming from syndication that includes second runs of current programming from WEEK-TV.	
September 29	Phoenix, Arizona	KEJR-LD → KMEE-LD	40.1	MeTV+	MeTV (via KMEE-TV)		
October 1	Charleston, Illinois	WEIU-TV	51.1	PBS	Educational independent	On August 19, 2025, Eastern Illinois University, the station that owns WEIU-TV, announced that it would disaffiliate with PBS when funding from the Corporation for Public Broadcasting ended on October 1. WEIU-TV became one of the many public broadcasting stations that were affected by the defunding of public media.	
October 20	Mobile, Alabama–Pensacola, Florida	WPMI-TV	15.1	NBC	Roar		
October 20	New York, New York	WMBC-TV	63.1	Merit TV	Estrella TV	The affiliation switch to Estrella TV expands the network's coverage in the New York City metropolitan area on top of MediaCo's owned-and-operated station WASA-LD. The switch comes months after Merit Street Media filed for Chapter 11 bankruptcy protection.	
October 30	Opelika, Alabama–Atlanta, Georgia	WGBP-TV → WHOT-TV	66.1	Merit TV	Hot 97 TV	Following a call sign change from WGBP-TV to WHOT-TV on October 1, 2025, CNZ Communications announced five days later that the station would begin to air programming from Mediaco Holding's Hot 97 TV free ad-supported streaming television (FAST) service effective October 30.	
December 1	Providence, Rhode Island	WLNE-TV	6.1	ABC	Roar		
December 1	Reno, Nevada	KRNV-DT	4.1	NBC	Roar		
December 1	Syracuse, New York	WTVH	5.1	CBS	Roar	See WKOF entry in Station launches	
December 1	Syracuse, New York	WKOF	15.1	Roar	CBS	See WKOF entry in Station launches	
December 8	Greeneville–Bristol–Johnson City–Kingsport, Tennessee–Bristol, Virginia	WEMT	39.1	Fox	Roar		
December 8	Greenville–Washington–New Bern–Jacksonville, North Carolina	WYDO	14.1	Fox	Roar		
December 8	Waterville–Portland, Maine	WPFO	23.1	Fox	Roar		
December 9	Chico–Redding, California	KCVU	20.1	Fox	Roar		
December 9	Eureka, California	KBVU	28.1	Fox	Roar		
December 10	Saginaw–Flint–Bay City–Midland, Michigan	WEYI-TV	25.1	NBC	Roar		
December 10	Gainesville, Florida	WNBW-DT	9.1	NBC	Roar		

=== Subchannels changing network affiliations ===
Subchannels changing network affiliations
Date	Market	Station	Channel	Prior affiliation	New affiliation	Notes	Source
January 2	Denver, Colorado	KWGN-TV	2.4	Charge!	HSN2		
January 2	Houston, Texas	KIAH	39.4	TBD	HSN2		
January 7	Grand Junction, Colorado	KLML	20.2	Dabl	Heroes & Icons		
January 7	Grand Junction, Colorado	KLML	20.3	Defy	Ion Plus		
January 7	Grand Junction, Colorado	KLML	20.6	Rewind TV	Start TV		
January 7	Grand Junction, Colorado	KLML	20.10	Infomercials	Daystar		
January 7	Idaho Falls, Idaho	KVUI	31.3	Infomercials	Heroes & Icons		
January 7	Idaho Falls, Idaho	KVUI	31.8	Rewind TV	Start TV		
January 12	Albuquerque, New Mexico	KNAT-TV	23.4	Smile	OnTV4U (transitional affiliation)	See Smile entry in closures	
January 12	Atlanta, Georgia	WHSG-TV	63.4	Smile	OnTV4U (transitional affiliation)	See Smile entry in closures	
January 12	Bartlesville–Tulsa, Oklahoma	KDOR-TV	17.4	Smile	OnTV4U (transitional affiliation)	See Smile entry in closures	
January 12	Chicago, Illinois	WWTO-TV	35.3	Smile	OnTV4U (transitional affiliation)	See Smile entry in closures	
January 12	Dallas–Fort Worth, Texas	KDTX-TV	58.4	Smile	OnTV4U (transitional affiliation)	See Smile entry in closures	
January 12	Denver, Colorado	KPJR-TV	38.4	Smile	OnTV4U (transitional affiliation)	See Smile entry in closures	
January 12	Henderson–Nashville, Tennessee	WPGD-TV	50.4	Smile	OnTV4U (transitional affiliation)	See Smile entry in closures	
January 12	Holly Springs, Mississippi– Memphis, Tennessee	WBUY-TV	40.4	Smile	OnTV4U (transitional affiliation)	See Smile entry in closures	
January 12	Jersey City, New Jersey– New York, New York	WTBY-TV	54.3	Smile	OnTV4U (transitional affiliation)	See Smile entry in closures	
January 12	Kansas City, Missouri	KTAJ-TV	16.4	Smile	OnTV4U (transitional affiliation)	See Smile entry in closures	
January 12	Los Angeles, California	KTBN-TV	40.4	Smile	OnTV4U (transitional affiliation)	See Smile entry in closures	
January 12	Miami, Florida	WHFT-TV	45.4	Smile	OnTV4U (transitional affiliation)	See Smile entry in closures	
January 12	Mobile, Alabama	WMPV-TV	21.4	Smile	OnTV4U (transitional affiliation)	See Smile entry in closures	
January 12	Oklahoma City, Oklahoma	KTBO-TV	14.4	Smile	OnTV4U (transitional affiliation)	See Smile entry in closures	
January 12	Portland, Oregon	KNMT	24.4	Smile	OnTV4U (transitional affiliation)	See Smile entry in closures	
January 12	Seattle, Washington	KTBW-TV	20.4	Smile	OnTV4U (transitional affiliation)	See Smile entry in closures	
January 14	Los Angeles, California	KTLA	5.4	TBD	Shop LC		
January 15	Chicago, Illinois	WGN-TV	9.5	TBD	The Nest		
February 5	Osage Beach–Springfield, Missouri	KRBK	49.3	Dabl	Charge!		
February 6	Grand Rapids, Michigan	WOTV	41.4	Dabl	Shop LC		
February 6	Grand Rapids, Michigan	WTLJ	54.7	Infomercials	Dabl		
February 6	Honolulu, Hawaii	KHON-TV	2.3	Dabl	Grit		
February 6	Providence, Rhode Island	WPRI-TV	12.4	Dabl	Defy		
February 9	Los Angeles, California	KFLA-LD	8.3	Best of ShopHQ	beIN Sports Xtra		
February 9	Sacramento, California	KSAO-LD	49.3	Best of ShopHQ	beIN Sports Xtra		
February 17	Akron–Cleveland, Ohio	WVPX-TV	23.5	Get	Game Show Central		
February 17	Arlington–Fort Worth–Dallas, Texas	KPXD-TV	68.6	Get	Game Show Central		
February 17	Boston, Massachusetts	WBPX-TV	68.6	Get	Game Show Central		
February 17	Cedar Rapids, Iowa	KPXR-TV	48.7	Get	Game Show Central		
February 17	Charleston, West Virginia	WLPX-TV	29.7	Get	Game Show Central		
February 17	Chicago, Illinois	WCPX-TV	38.7	Get	Game Show Central		
February 17	Columbia, South Carolina	WZRB	47.4	Grit	Ion Plus		
February 17	Columbia, South Carolina	WZRB	47.5	Defy	Catchy Comedy		
February 17	Columbia, South Carolina	WZRB	47.7	Get	Game Show Central		
February 17	Concord–Manchester, New Hampshire	WPXG-TV	21.6	Get	Game Show Central		
February 17	Conroe–Houston, Texas	KPXB-TV	49.6	Get	Game Show Central		
February 17	East St. Louis, Illinois–St. Louis, Missouri	WRBU	46.6	Get	Game Show Central		
February 17	Franklin–Nashville, Tennessee	WNPX-TV	28.7	Get	Game Show Central		
February 17	Jellico–Knoxville, Tennessee	WPXK-TV	54.6	Get	Game Show Central		
February 17	Lake Shore, Maryland	WQAW-LD	69.2	Get	Game Show Central		
February 17	Lewiston–Portland, Maine	WIPL	35.7	Get	Game Show Central		
February 17	Manassas, Virginia–Washington, D.C.	WPXW-TV	66.7	Get	Game Show Central		
February 17	Melbourne–Orlando, Florida	WOPX-TV	56.6	Get	Game Show Central		
February 17	Miami, Florida	WPXM-TV	35.7	Get	Game Show Central		
February 17	New Orleans, Louisiana	WPXL-TV	49.5	Get	Game Show Central		
February 17	Newport–Providence, Rhode Island	WPXQ-TV	69.5	Get	Game Show Central		
February 17	Newton–Des Moines, Iowa	KFPX-TV	39.7	Get	Game Show Central		
February 17	Oklahoma City, Oklahoma	KOPX-TV	62.4	Grit	Movies!		
February 17	Oklahoma City, Oklahoma	KOPX-TV	62.6	Get	Game Show Central		
February 17	Okmulgee–Tulsa, Oklahoma	KTPX-TV	44.4	Grit	Movies!		
February 17	Okmulgee–Tulsa, Oklahoma	KTPX-TV	44.6	Get	Game Show Central		
February 17	Pittsburgh, Pennsylvania	WINP-TV	16.6	Get	Game Show Central		
February 17	Roanoke–Lynchburg, Virginia	WPXR-TV	38.7	Get	Game Show Central		
February 17	Rocky Mount–Raleigh–Durham, North Carolina	WRPX-TV	47.6	Get	Game Show Central		
February 17	Rome–Atlanta, Georgia	WPXA-TV	14.7	Get	Game Show Central		
February 17	Sacramento, California	KSPX-TV	29.7	Get	Game Show Central		
February 17	St. Cloud–Minneapolis–St. Paul, Minnesota	KPXM-TV	41.7	Get	Game Show Central		
February 17	Salem–Portland, Oregon	KPXG-TV	22.6	Get	Game Show Central		
February 17	San Bernardino–Los Angeles, California	KPXN-TV	30.6	Get	Game Show Central		
February 17	San Diego, California	KGTV	10.6	Get	Game Show Central		
February 17	San Jose–San Francisco, California	KKPX-TV	65.7	Get	Game Show Central		
February 17	Scranton–Wilkes-Barre, Pennsylvania	WQPX-TV	64.7	Get	Game Show Central		
February 17	Syracuse, New York	WSPX-TV	56.7	Get	Game Show Central		
February 17	Uvalde–San Antonio, Texas	KPXL-TV	26.7	Get	Game Show Central		
February 17	Wilmington, Delaware–Philadelphia, Pennsylvania	WPPX-TV	61.6	Get	Game Show Central		
March 1	Akron–Cleveland, Ohio	WVPX-TV	23.3	Bounce TV	Busted	See Busted entry in launches	
March 1	Albany, New York	WYPX-TV	55.6	Grit	Busted	See Busted entry in launches	
March 1	Albuquerque, New Mexico	KQDF-LD	25.6	National Black Television (NBT)	Busted	See Busted entry in launches	
March 1	Ann Arbor–Detroit, Michigan	WPXD-TV	31.5	Laff	Busted	See Busted entry in launches	
March 1	Appleton–Green Bay, Wisconsin	WACY-TV	32.5	Ion Television	Busted	See Busted entry in launches	
March 1	Arlington–Dallas–Fort Worth, Texas	KPXD-TV	68.5	Grit	Busted	See Busted entry in launches	
March 1	Atlanta, Georgia	WPXA-TV	14.6	Grit	Busted	See Busted entry in launches	
March 1	Austin, Texas	KVUE	24.7	Nosey	Busted	See Busted entry in launches	
March 1	Bakersfield, California	KERO-TV	23.6	Ion Plus	Busted	See Busted entry in launches	
March 1	Baltimore, Maryland	WMAR-TV	2.7	Laff	Busted	See Busted entry in launches	
March 1	Bangor, Maine	W20ER-D	20.4	Infomercials	Busted	See Busted entry in launches	
March 1	Bangor, Maine	W32FS-D	32.2	Infomercials	Busted	See Busted entry in launches	
March 1	Batavia–Buffalo, New York	WPXJ-TV	51.6	Ion Mystery	Busted	See Busted entry in launches	
March 1	Battle Creek–Grand Rapids, Michigan	WZPX-TV	43.6	Ion Plus	Busted	See Busted entry in launches	
March 1	Bellevue–Seattle, Washington	KWPX-TV	33.6	Ion Mystery	Busted	See Busted entry in launches	
March 1	Billings, Montana	KTVQ	2.5	Ion Television	Busted	See Busted entry in launches	
March 1	Biloxi, Mississippi	W33EG-D	32.2	MtrSpt1	Busted	See Busted entry in launches	
March 1	Birmingham, Alabama	WPXH-TV	44.5	Ion Mystery	Busted	See Busted entry in launches	
March 1	Bloomington–Indianapolis, Indiana	WIPX-TV	63.3	Bounce TV	Busted	See Busted entry in launches	
March 1	Boise, Idaho	KTRV-TV	12.4	Ion Mystery	Busted	See Busted entry in launches	
March 1	Boston, Massachusetts	WBPX-TV	68.3	Laff	Busted	See Busted entry in launches	
March 1	Bozeman, Montana	KBZK	7.6	Laff	Busted	See Busted entry in launches	
March 1	Bradenton–Tampa, Florida	WXPX-TV	66.6	Ion Mystery	Busted	See Busted entry in launches	
March 1	Burlington–Greensboro, North Carolina	WGPX-TV	16.6	Grit	Busted	See Busted entry in launches	
March 1	Butte, Montana	KXLF-TV	4.6	Laff	Busted	See Busted entry in launches	
March 1	Cedar Rapids, Iowa	KPXR-TV	48.6	Ion Mystery	Busted	See Busted entry in launches	
March 1	Champaign, Illinois	W23EW-D	41.4	BeIN Sports Xtra	Busted	See Busted entry in launches	
March 1	Charleston–Huntington, West Virginia	WLPX-TV	29.6	Grit	Busted	See Busted entry in launches	
March 1	Charlotte, North Carolina	WWJS	14.4	Jewelry Television	Busted	See Busted entry in launches	
March 1	Chicago, Illinois	WCPX-TV	38.6	Grit	Busted	See Busted entry in launches	
March 1	Cincinnati, Ohio	WCPO-TV	9.6	Ion Plus	Busted	See Busted entry in launches	
March 1	Colorado Springs, Colorado	KOAA-TV	5.5	Ion Television	Busted	See Busted entry in launches	
March 1	Columbia–Jefferson City, Missouri	K35OY-D	35.6	Salem News Channel	Busted	See Busted entry in launches	
March 1	Columbia, South Carolina	WZRB	47.6	Laff	Busted	See Busted entry in launches	
March 1	Columbus, Georgia	WRBL	3.2	Rewind TV	Busted	See Busted entry in launches	
March 1	Columbus, Ohio	WBNS-TV	10.7	Nosey	Busted	See Busted entry in launches	
March 1	Concord–Manchester, New Hampshire	WPXG-TV	21.3	Laff	Busted	See Busted entry in launches	
March 1	Conroe–Houston, Texas	KPXB-TV	49.5	Ion Mystery	Busted	See Busted entry in launches	
March 1	Corpus Christi, Texas	KRIS-TV	6.6	Ion Mystery	Busted	See Busted entry in launches	
March 1	Davenport, Iowa	WQAD-TV	8.7	Ion Television	Busted	See Busted entry in launches	
March 1	Denver, Colorado	KPXC-TV	59.5	Laff	Busted	See Busted entry in launches	
March 1	Des Moines, Iowa	KFPX-TV	39.6	Grit	Busted	See Busted entry in launches	
March 1	East St. Louis, Illinois– St. Louis, Missouri	WRBU	46.5	Grit	Busted	See Busted entry in launches	
March 1	Eugene, Oregon	KORY-CD	15.6	Salem News Channel	Busted	See Busted entry in launches	
March 1	Eugene, Oregon	K06QR-D	41.4	MtrSpt1	Busted	See Busted entry in launches	
March 1	Evansville, Indiana	WDLH-LD	24.2	MtrSpt1	Busted	See Busted entry in launches	
March 1	Fargo, North Dakota	K15MR-D	51.4	Infomercials	Busted	See Busted entry in launches	
March 1	Flint, Michigan	WFFC-LD	17.6	QVC	Busted	See Busted entry in launches	
March 1	Flint, Michigan	W35DQ-D	24.3	MtrSpt1	Busted	See Busted entry in launches	
March 1	Fort Myers, Florida	WGPS-LD	22.6	ShopHQ	Busted	See Busted entry in launches	
March 1	Fort Smith, Arkansas	KFSM-TV	5.6	Shop LC	Busted	See Busted entry in launches	
March 1	Franklin–Nashville, Tennessee	WNPX-TV	28.6	Ion Mystery	Busted	See Busted entry in launches	
March 1	Fresno, California	KZMM-CD	22.2	CRTV	Busted	See Busted entry in launches	
March 1	Greenville, North Carolina	WPXU-TV	35.6	Ion Mystery	Busted	See Busted entry in launches	
March 1	Greenville, North Carolina	WEPX-TV	38.6	Ion Mystery	Busted	See Busted entry in launches	
March 1	Greenville, South Carolina	WGGS-TV	16.8	Get	Busted	See Busted entry in launches	
March 1	Gulf Shores–Mobile, Alabama	WFNA	55.3	True Crime Network	Busted	See Busted entry in launches	
March 1	Hagerstown, Maryland	WWPX-TV	60.6	Ion Mystery	Busted	See Busted entry in launches	
March 1	Harlingen, Texas	KRZG-CD	35.4	Infomercials	Busted	See Busted entry in launches	
March 1	Harlingen, Texas	KNWS-LD	64.7	Infomercials	Busted	See Busted entry in launches	
March 1	Hartford, Connecticut	WHPX-TV	26.5	Grit	Busted	See Busted entry in launches	
March 1	Helena, Montana	KXLH-LD	9.5	Ion Plus	Busted	See Busted entry in launches	
March 1	Jellico–Knoxville, Tennessee	WPXK-TV	54.5	Ion Plus	Busted	See Busted entry in launches	
March 1	Joplin, Missouri	KRLJ-LD	45.7	NTD America	Busted	See Busted entry in launches	
March 1	Joplin, Missouri	KPJO-LD	49.6	Outdoor America	Busted	See Busted entry in launches	
March 1	Kansas City, Missouri	KPXE-TV	50.4	Grit	Busted	See Busted entry in launches	
March 1	Kenosha–Milwaukee, Wisconsin	WPXE-TV	55.6	Laff	Busted	See Busted entry in launches	
March 1	Lafayette, Louisiana	K21OM-D	20.5	Infomercials	Busted	See Busted entry in launches	
March 1	Lake Worth–West Palm Beach, Florida	WPXP-TV	67.5	Ion Plus	Busted	See Busted entry in launches	
March 1	Lansing, Michigan	WSYM-TV	47.7	Laff	Busted	See Busted entry in launches	
March 1	Las Vegas, Nevada	KMCC	34.4	Grit	Busted	See Busted entry in launches	
March 1	Lewiston–Portland, Maine	WIPL	35.6	Ion Mystery	Busted	See Busted entry in launches	
March 1	Lexington, Kentucky	WUPX-TV	67.3	Grit	Busted	See Busted entry in launches	
March 1	Little Rock, Arkansas	KTHV	11.7	Ion Television	Busted	See Busted entry in launches	
March 1	Los Angeles, California	KPXN-TV	30.5	Bounce TV	Game Show Central	See Busted entry in launches	
March 1	Los Angeles, California	KPXN-TV	30.6	Game Show Central	Busted	See Busted entry in launches	
March 1	Louisville, Kentucky	WHAS-TV	11.4	Court TV	Busted	See Busted entry in launches	
March 1	Madison, Wisconsin	WZCK-LD	8.4	MtrSpt1	Busted	See Busted entry in launches	
March 1	Manassas, Virginia– Washington, D.C.	WPXW-TV	66.6	Ion Mystery	Busted	See Busted entry in launches	
March 1	Melbourne–Orlando, Florida	WOPX-TV	56.5	Laff	Busted	See Busted entry in launches	
March 1	Memphis, Tennessee	WPXX-TV	50.5	Laff	Busted	See Busted entry in launches	
March 1	Miami, Florida	WPXM-TV	35.5	Ion Plus	Busted	See Busted entry in launches	
March 1	Minneapolis, Minnesota	KPXM-TV	41.7	Game Show Central	Busted	See Busted entry in launches	
March 1	Monterey, California	K09AAF-D	9.4	Fun Roads	Busted	See Busted entry in launches	
March 1	New York, New York	WPXN-TV	31.4	Laff	Court TV	See Busted entry in launches	
March 1	New York, New York	WPXN-TV	31.7	Ion Mystery	Busted	See Busted entry in launches	
March 1	Newport–Providence, Rhode Island	WPXQ-TV	69.3	Ion Plus	Busted	See Busted entry in launches	
March 1	Norfolk, Virginia	WPXV-TV	49.5	Grit	Busted	See Busted entry in launches	
March 1	Oklahoma City, Oklahoma	KOPX-TV	62.5	Ion Plus	Busted	See Busted entry in launches	
March 1	Omaha, Nebraska	KAJS-LD	33.6	BeIN Sports Xtra	Busted	See Busted entry in launches	
March 1	Palm Springs, California	K21DO-D	21.4	MtrSpt1	Busted	See Busted entry in launches	
March 1	Peoria, Illinois	W27EQ-D	27.4	MtrSpt1	Busted	See Busted entry in launches	
March 1	Philadelphia, Pennsylvania	WPPX-TV	61.5	Grit	Busted	See Busted entry in launches	
March 1	Phoenix, Arizona	KPPX-TV	51.4	Laff	Busted	See Busted entry in launches	
March 1	Pittsburgh, Pennsylvania	WINP-TV	16.5	Court TV	Busted	See Busted entry in launches	
March 1	Portland, Oregon	KPXG-TV	22.5	Grit	Busted	See Busted entry in launches	
March 1	Provo–Salt Lake City, Utah	KUPX-TV	16.6	Ion Mystery	Busted	See Busted entry in launches	
March 1	Quincy, Illinois	K14SU-D	14.3	Infomercials	Busted	See Busted entry in launches	
March 1	Quincy, Illinois	WVDM-LD	40.4	Infomercials	Busted	See Busted entry in launches	
March 1	Raleigh, North Carolina	WRPX-TV	47.4	Bounce TV	Game Show Central	See Busted entry in launches	
March 1	Raleigh, North Carolina	WRPX-TV	47.6	Game Show Central	Busted	See Busted entry in launches	
March 1	Reno, Nevada	K07AAI-D	12.4	Salem News Channel	Busted	See Busted entry in launches	
March 1	Richmond, Virginia	WTVR-TV	6.6	Ion Plus	Busted	See Busted entry in launches	
March 1	Roanoke, Virginia	WPXR-TV	38.6	Grit	Busted	See Busted entry in launches	
March 1	Sacramento, California	KSPX-TV	29.6	Grit	Busted	See Busted entry in launches	
March 1	San Angelo, Texas	KIDY	6.5	Court TV	Busted	See Busted entry in launches	
March 1	San Antonio, Texas	KPXL-TV	26.6	Grit	Busted	See Busted entry in launches	
March 1	San Francisco, California	KKPX-TV	65.6	Grit	Busted	See Busted entry in launches	
March 1	San Luis Obispo, California	KSBY	6.5	Ion Mystery	Busted	See Busted entry in launches	
March 1	Savannah, Georgia	WDID-LD	26.2	BeIN Sports Xtra	Busted	See Busted entry in launches	
March 1	Scranton, Pennsylvania	WQPX-TV	64.6	Laff	Busted	See Busted entry in launches	
March 1	Shreveport, Louisiana	KTAL-TV	6.4	HSN	Busted	See Busted entry in launches	
March 1	Spokane, Washington	KGPX-TV	34.6	Laff	Busted	See Busted entry in launches	
March 1	Springfield, Missouri	KFKY-LD	20.4	BeIN Sports Xtra	Busted	See Busted entry in launches	
March 1	Springfield, Missouri	KCNH-LD	47.6	Defy	Busted	See Busted entry in launches	
March 1	Syracuse, New York	WSPX-TV	56.6	Laff	Busted	See Busted entry in launches	
March 1	Tallahassee, Florida	WTXL-TV	27.6	Laff	Busted	See Busted entry in launches	
March 1	Traverse City, Michigan	W36FH-D	36.6	Salem News Channel	Busted	See Busted entry in launches	
March 1	Tucson, Arizona	KGUN-TV	9.6	Ion Mystery	Busted	See Busted entry in launches	
March 1	Tulsa, Oklahoma	KJRH-TV	2.6	Ion Television	Busted	See Busted entry in launches	
March 1	Waco, Texas	KXXV	25.5	Ion Plus	Busted	See Busted entry in launches	
March 1	Wichita, Kansas	KSNW	3.4	True Crime Network	Busted	See Busted entry in launches	
March 1	Wilmington, North Carolina	WQDH-LD	49.7	Jewelry Television	Busted	See Busted entry in launches	
March 9	Sacramento, California	KSAO-LD	49.3	beIN Sports Xtra	Binge TV		
March 9	Sacramento, California	KSAO-LD	49.6	AWE Plus	beIN Sports Xtra		
March 9	Sacramento, California	KSAO-LD	49.12	Outdoor America	AWE Plus		
March 23	Sacramento, California	KAHC-LD	43.2	Magnificent Movies Network	NTD America		
March 27	Akron–Cleveland, Ohio	WBNX-TV	55.3	Movies!	Rewind TV		
March 31	Sacramento–Stockton–Modesto, California	KXTV	10.3	Grit	Quest		
March 31	Sacramento–Stockton–Modesto, California	KXTV	10.4	Ion Mystery	Laff		
April 25	Denver, Colorado	KWGN-TV	2.2	Get	Charge!		
April 26	St. Louis, Missouri	KPLR-TV	11.4	Rewind TV	365BLK		
May 2	Nashville, Tennessee	WKRN-TV	2.4	Rewind TV	365BLK		
May 29	Tulsa, Oklahoma	KGEB	53.7	SD simulcast of the main affiliate GEB America	True Crime Network		
June 2	Sacramento, California	KSAO-LD	49.14	beIN Sports Xtra en Español	Z Living		
June 9	Chicago, Illinois	WJYS	62.2	Chicago Sports Network	Stadium	As a result of Comcast's agreement to carry the network, CHSN discontinued free-to-air carriage on all of its OTA affiliates within Illinois, along with areas where Comcast is the dominant provider, at midnight on June 9, 2025. Some of its stations replaced it with Stadium.	
June 9	Chicago, Illinois	WJYS	62.3	Chicago Sports Network	Stadium	As a result of Comcast's agreement to carry the network, CHSN discontinued free-to-air carriage on all of its OTA affiliates within Illinois, along with areas where Comcast is the dominant provider, at midnight on June 9, 2025. Some of its stations replaced it with Stadium.	
June 9	Fort Wayne, Indiana	WINM	12.3	Chicago Sports Network	Stadium	As a result of Comcast's agreement to carry the network, CHSN discontinued free-to-air carriage on all of its OTA affiliates within Illinois, along with areas where Comcast is the dominant provider, at midnight on June 9, 2025. Some of its stations replaced it with Stadium.	
June 9	Peoria, Illinois	WHOI	19.4	Chicago Sports Network	Stadium	As a result of Comcast's agreement to carry the network, CHSN discontinued free-to-air carriage on all of its OTA affiliates within Illinois, along with areas where Comcast is the dominant provider, at midnight on June 9, 2025. Some of its stations replaced it with Stadium.	
June 9	South Bend, Indiana	WNDU-TV	16.2	Chicago Sports Network	365BLK	As a result of Comcast's agreement to carry the network, CHSN discontinued free-to-air carriage on all of its OTA affiliates within Illinois, along with areas where Comcast is the dominant provider, at midnight on June 9, 2025. Some of its stations replaced it with Stadium.	
July 1	Bradenton–Tampa, Florida	WXPX-TV	66.2	Court TV	Ion Television	See WXPX entry in Stations changing network affiliations	
July 11	Cleveland, Ohio	WQHS-DT	61.5	Nuestra Visión	HSN2		
July 15	Enid–Tulsa, Oklahoma	KUOC-LD	48.1	Salem News Channel	Confess		
July 15	Enid–Tulsa, Oklahoma	KUOC-LD	48.6	Infomercials	Nosey		
July 15	Louisville, Kentucky	WMYO-CD	24.6	Charge!	Jewelry Television		
July 15	Phoenix, Arizona	KVPA-LD	42.16	Classic TV programming	Z Living		
July 29	Fresno, California	KFTV-DT	21.4	Grit	Confess		
July 30	Salt Lake City, Utah	KTVX	4.2	MeTV	Antenna TV		
July 30	Salt Lake City, Utah	KSTU	13.2	Antenna TV	Ion Television		
July 31	South Bend, Indiana	WSJV	28.7	365BLK	The Nest		
August 1	Eastern North Carolina (New Bern, North Carolina)	WCTI-TV	12.3	Dabl	Roar		
August 1	Greeneville–Bristol–Johnson City–Kingsport, Tennessee–Bristol, Virginia	WEMT	39.2	Dabl	Roar		
August 1	Greeneville–Bristol–Johnson City–Kingsport, Tennessee–Bristol, Virginia	WEMT	39.4	Roar	The Nest		
August 1	Saginaw–Flint–Bay City–Midland, Michigan	WEYI-TV	25.4	Dabl	The Nest		
August 1	Nashville, Tennessee	WZTV	17.4	Roar	Charge!	See WNAB entry in Stations changing network affiliations	
August 1	Albany, New York	WYBN-LD	14.4	Binge TV	MovieSphere Gold		
August 1	Atlanta, Georgia	WUVG-DT	34.6	Infomercials	MovieSphere Gold		
August 1	Baltimore, Maryland	WMJF-CD	23.2	Jewelry Television	MovieSphere Gold		
August 1	Baton Rouge, Louisiana	K27NB-D	43.2	Cozi TV	MovieSphere Gold		
August 1	Birmingham, Alabama	WVUA	23.2	TheGrio	MovieSphere Gold		
August 1	Boise, Idaho	KKJB	39.3	Antenna TV	MovieSphere Gold		
August 1	Boston, Massachusetts	WUNI	66.2	Bounce TV	MovieSphere Gold		
August 1	Buffalo, New York	WVTT-CD	34.2	NTD America	MovieSphere Gold		
August 1	Charlotte, North Carolina	WWJS	14.6	Infomercials	MovieSphere Gold		
August 1	Chattanooga, Tennessee	WYHB-CD	39.8	Fubo Sports Network	MovieSphere Gold		
August 1	Chicago, Illinois	WGBO-DT	66.2	Blank	MovieSphere Gold		
August 1	Chico–Redding, California	KRDT-CD	23.4	Ventana TV	MovieSphere Gold		
August 1	Columbus, Georgia	W29FD-D	43.3	Get	MovieSphere Gold		
August 1	Columbus, Ohio	WDEM-CD	17.2	Oxygen	MovieSphere Gold		
August 1	Corpus Christi, Texas	K21OC-D	54.2	Estrella TV	MovieSphere Gold		
August 1	Dallas–Fort Worth, Texas	KUVN-DT	23.4	Blank	MovieSphere Gold		
August 1	Dayton, Ohio	WRCX-LD	40.4	Video Mix TV	MovieSphere Gold		
August 1	Denver, Colorado	KCEC	14.2	Bounce TV	MovieSphere Gold		
August 1	Detroit, Michigan	WADL	38.4	Jewelry Television	MovieSphere Gold		
August 1	Duluth, Minnesota	KMYN-LD	32.2	Daystar	MovieSphere Gold		
August 1	Eugene, Oregon	K06QR-D	41.3	The First TV	MovieSphere Gold		
August 1	Fargo, North Dakota	K15MR-D	51.8	Law & Crime	MovieSphere Gold		
August 1	Fort Wayne, Indiana	WCUH-LD	16.6	Fubo Sports Network	MovieSphere Gold		
August 1	Fort Wayne, Indiana	WFWC-CD	45.6	NTD America	MovieSphere Gold		
August 1	Fresno, California	KTFF-DT	61.4	Shop LC	MovieSphere Gold		
August 1	Gainesville, Florida	WNFT-LD	8.7	Blank	MovieSphere Gold		
August 1	Grand Junction, Colorado	KLML	20.7	Jewelry Television Español	MovieSphere Gold		
August 1	Hartford, Connecticut	WRNT-LD	32.3	Infomercials	MovieSphere Gold		
August 1	Houston, Texas	KXLN-DT	45.4	Nuestra Visión	MovieSphere Gold		
August 1	Huntsville, Alabama	W34EY-D	38.2	NTD America	MovieSphere Gold		
August 1	Indianapolis, Indiana	WUDZ-LD	28.3	Salem News Channel	MovieSphere Gold		
August 1	Jacksonville, Florida	WODH-LD	34.2	Infomercials	MovieSphere Gold		
August 1	Jacksonville, Florida	WKBJ-LD	20.2	Infomercials	MovieSphere Gold		
August 1	Keokuk, Iowa	K14SU-D	14.6	—N/a	MovieSphere Gold		
August 1	Knoxville, Tennessee	WEZK-LD	28.5	Blank	MovieSphere Gold		
August 1	Las Vegas, Nevada	K36NE-D	43.2	Infomercials	MovieSphere Gold		
August 1	Lexington, Kentucky	WBON-LD	9.3	Heartland	MovieSphere Gold		
August 1	Little Rock, Arkansas	KKYK-CD	30.3	Binge TV	MovieSphere Gold		
August 1	Los Angeles, California	KMEX-DT	34.4	Bounce TV	MovieSphere Gold		
August 1	Louisville, Kentucky	WBNA	21.3	Buzzr	MovieSphere Gold		
August 1	Lubbock, Texas	K32OV-D	24.6	Infomercials	MovieSphere Gold		
August 1	Macon, Georgia	W28EU-D	42.3	Infomercials	MovieSphere Gold		
August 1	Memphis, Tennessee	WTME-LD	35.4	France 24	MovieSphere Gold		
August 1	Miami–Fort Lauderdale, Florida	WLTV-DT	23.4	Blank	MovieSphere Gold		
August 1	Milwaukee–Green Bay, Wisconsin	WIWN	68.2/.4/.10	Infomercials	MovieSphere Gold		
August 1	Mobile, Alabama	WPAN	53.4	TheGrio	MovieSphere Gold		
August 1	Monterey, California	K09AAF-D	9.5	Infomercials	MovieSphere Gold		
August 1	Monroe, Louisiana	KMCT-TV	39.7	HSN	MovieSphere Gold		
August 1	Naples–Fort Myers, Florida	WXDT-LD	23.2	Infomercials	MovieSphere Gold		
August 1	Nashville, Tennessee	WKUW-LD	35.2	Shop LC	MovieSphere Gold		
August 1	New Orleans, Louisiana	KGLA-DT	42.3	Blank	MovieSphere Gold		
August 1	New York City, New York	WXTV-DT	41.2	Bounce TV	MovieSphere Gold		
August 1	Oklahoma City, Oklahoma	KTUZ-TV	30.5	MeTV Toons	MovieSphere Gold		
August 1	Omaha, Nebraska	KAJS-LD	33.3	Law & Crime	MovieSphere Gold		
August 1	Orlando, Florida	WVEN-TV	43.3	Ion Mystery	MovieSphere Gold		
August 1	Palm Springs, California	K21DO-D	21.3	Blank	MovieSphere Gold		
August 1	Peoria, Illinois	W27EQ-D	27.6	Fubo Sports Network	MovieSphere Gold		
August 1	Philadelphia, Pennsylvania	WFPA-CD	28.4	Blank	MovieSphere Gold		
August 1	Pittsburgh, Pennsylvania	WOSC-CD	61.2	Binge TV	MovieSphere Gold		
August 1	Pocatello–Idaho Falls, Idaho	KVUI	31.7	Jewelry Television	MovieSphere Gold		
August 1	Raleigh, North Carolina	WUVC-DT	40.6	Blank	MovieSphere Gold		
August 1	Raleigh, North Carolina	WTNC-LD	26.7	Blank	MovieSphere Gold		
August 1	Reno, Nevada	KCNL-LD	3.4	Right Now TV	MovieSphere Gold		
August 1	Richmond, Virginia	WWBK-LD	28.3	Infomercials	MovieSphere Gold		
August 1	Richmond, Virginia	WFWG-LD	30.2	Infomercials	MovieSphere Gold		
August 1	Richmond, Virginia	WUDW-LD	53.2	Infomercials	MovieSphere Gold		
August 1	Rochester, Minnesota	KXSH-LD	35.3	QVC	MovieSphere Gold		
August 1	Rochester, Minnesota	KMQV-LD	49.2	Infomercials	MovieSphere Gold		
August 1	Rochester, New York	WAWW-LD	20.3	Cornerstone Television	MovieSphere Gold		
August 1	St. Louis, Missouri	KBGU-LD	33.4	—N/a	MovieSphere Gold		
August 1	St. Louis, Missouri	WODK-LD	45.2	Infomericals	MovieSphere Gold		
August 1	San Antonio, Texas	KNIC-DT	17.3	Blank	MovieSphere Gold		
August 1	San Antonio, Texas	KCOR-CD	34.3	Blank	MovieSphere Gold		
August 1	San Francisco, California	KFSF-DT	66.3	Blank	MovieSphere Gold		
August 1	San Luis Obispo, California	KSBO-CD	42.2	Infomercials	MovieSphere Gold		
August 1	Springfield, Illinois	WEAE-LD	21.6	Law & Crime	MovieSphere Gold		
August 1	Springfield, Illinois	W23EW-D	41.2	NTD America	MovieSphere Gold		
August 1	Springfield, Missouri	KRFT-LD	8.2	Binge TV	MovieSphere Gold		
August 1	Springfield, Missouri	KXMP-LD	8.2	—N/a	MovieSphere Gold		
August 1	Syracuse, New York	WMJQ-CD	40.4	QVC2	MovieSphere Gold		
August 1	Tacoma–Seattle, Washington	KSTW	11.5	Start TV	MovieSphere Gold		
August 1	Tampa, Florida	WVEA-TV	50.2	Blank	MovieSphere Gold		
August 1	Tucson, Arizona	KUVE-DT	46.4	Blank	MovieSphere Gold		
August 1	Tucson, Arizona	KUVE-CD	42.4	Blank	MovieSphere Gold		
August 1	Waco, Texas	KZCZ-LD	34.2	NTD America	MovieSphere Gold		
August 1	Waco, Texas	KAXW-LD	35.3	NBC American Crimes	MovieSphere Gold		
August 1	Wausau, Wisconsin	WJFW-TV	12.4	HSN	MovieSphere Gold		
August 1	Wausau, Wisconsin	WJFW-TV	12.6	Shop LC	MovieSphere Gold		
August 1	Wichita, Kansas	KFVT-LD	34.3	Jewelry Television	MovieSphere Gold		
August 1	Wilmington, North Carolina	WQDH-LD	49.3	NTD America	MovieSphere Gold		
August 2	Portland, Maine	WPFO	23.4	Dabl	Antenna TV		
August 2	Richmond, Virginia	WRLH-TV	35.5	Dabl	The Nest		
August 2	Tallahassee, Florida	WTLF	24.5	Dabl	Antenna TV		
August 2	Port Arthur–Beaumont, Texas	KBTV-TV	4.2	Roar	Charge!		
August 2	Port Arthur–Beaumont, Texas	KBTV-TV	4.5	Charge!	Dabl		
August 4	Miami–Fort Lauderdale, Florida	WSVN	7.2	365BLK	ABC	See WPLG entry in Stations changing network affiliations	
August 4	Miami–Fort Lauderdale, Florida	WSVN	7.3	Defy	365BLK	See WPLG entry in Stations changing network affiliations	
August 8	Cedar Rapids, Iowa	KFXA	28.3	Roar	Comet		
August 8	Cedar Rapids, Iowa	KFXA	28.5	Comet	Dabl		
August 11	Beaumont, Texas	KUMJ-LD	23.3	—N/a	MovieSphere Gold		
September 1	Shaker Heights–Cleveland, Ohio	WOIO	19.2	MeTV (primary) / MyNetworkTV (secondary)	MeTV (full-time)	See WBNX entry in Stations changing network affiliations	
September 1	Elmira, New York	WENY-TV	36.3	The CW Plus	Independent	See WBNX entry in Stations changing network affiliations	
September 1	Elmira, New York	WETM-TV	18.2	Antenna TV	The CW Plus	See WBNX entry in Stations changing network affiliations	
September 1	Elmira, New York	WETM-TV	18.3	Laff	Antenna TV	See WBNX entry in Stations changing network affiliations	
September 1	Erie, Pennsylvania	WJET-TV	24.2	Laff	The CW Plus	See WBNX entry in Stations changing network affiliations	
September 1	Erie, Pennsylvania	WSEE-TV	35.2	The CW Plus	Independent	See WBNX entry in Stations changing network affiliations	
September 3	Sacramento–Stockton–Modesto, California	KXTV	10.5	Quest	Comet	Quest moved to 10.3 in March; channel was off the air for about five months.	
September 23	Sacramento, California	KSAO-LD	49.4	Ace TV	All Women's Sports Network (AWSN)		
September 23	Sacramento, California	KSAO-LD	49.14	Infomercials	Oz TV		
September 23	Sacramento, California	KSAO-LD	49.15	—N/a	Infomercials		
September 25	Mobile, Alabama	WKRG-TV	5.3	MeTV	Antenna TV		
September 26	Augusta, Georgia	WJBF	6.2	MeTV	The CW Plus		
September 26	Augusta, Georgia	WJBF	6.3	The CW Plus	Antenna TV		
September 26	Augusta, Georgia	WRDW-TV	12.3	Peachtree Sports Network	MeTV		
September 29	Atlanta, Georgia	WSB-TV	2.4	Comet	WEST	See WEST entry in Launches	
September 29	Boise, Idaho	KKJB	35.5	Antenna TV	WEST	See WEST entry in Launches	
September 29	Detroit, Michigan	WJBK	2.4	Heroes & Icons	WEST	See WEST entry in Launches	
September 29	Green Bay, Wisconsin	WMEI	31.4	MeTV+	WEST	See WEST entry in Launches	
September 29	Jacksonville, Florida	WJKF-CD	9.2	Blank	WEST	See WEST entry in Launches	
September 29	Kingman, Arizona	KMOH-TV	6.5	MeTV Toons	WEST	See WEST entry in Launches	
September 29	Los Angeles, California	KVME-TV	20.2	Heroes & Icons	WEST	See WEST entry in Launches	
September 29	Los Angeles, California	KSFV-CD	27.2	Heroes & Icons	WEST	See WEST entry in Launches	
September 29	Louisville, Kentucky	WMYO-CD	24.4	Blank	WEST	See WEST entry in Launches	
September 29	Merced–Fresno, California	KGMC	43.9	Laff	WEST	See WEST entry in Launches	
September 29	Milwaukee, Wisconsin	WYTU-LD	63.3	MeTV+	WEST	See WEST entry in Launches	
September 29	Nashville, Tennessee	WJFB	44.6	MeTV+	WEST	See WEST entry in Launches	
September 29	New York City, New York	WJLP	33.4	MeTV Toons	WEST	See WEST entry in Launches	
September 29	Oklahoma City, Oklahoma	KUOK-CD	36.3	—N/a	WEST	See WEST entry in Launches	
September 29	Orlando, Florida	WRDQ	27.4	HSN2	WEST	See WEST entry in Launches	
September 29	Pittsburgh, Pennsylvania	WOSC-CD	61.5	AWE Plus	WEST	See WEST entry in Launches	
September 29	St. George, Utah	KCSG	8.5	MeTV+	WEST	See WEST entry in Launches	
September 29	St. Louis, Missouri	KNLC	24.7	MeTV+	WEST	See WEST entry in Launches	
September 29	St. Petersburg–Tampa, Florida	WSPF-CD	35.5	Infomercials	WEST	See WEST entry in Launches	
September 29	Tulsa, Oklahoma	KUTU-CD	25.4	Ace TV	WEST	See WEST entry in Launches	
September 29	Phoenix, Arizona	KAZT-TV	7.2	MeTV	Independent		
October 20	Pensacola, Florida–Mobile, Alabama	WEAR-TV	3.2	Roar	NBC		
October 21	Sacramento, California	KSAO-LD	49.6	beIN Sports Xtra	In Touch+		
October 21	Sacramento, California	KSAO-LD	49.15	Infomercials	beIN Sports Xtra		
November 1	New Bern, North Carolina	WCTI-TV	12.4	Roar	True Crime Network		
November 2	Nashville, Tennessee	WZTV	17.4	Charge!	True Crime Network		
November 16	Saginaw–Flint–Bay City–Midland, Michigan	WEYI-TV	25.4	The Nest	Quest		
December 1	Providence, Rhode Island	WJAR-TV	10.2	Charge!	ABC	See WLNE-TV entry in Stations changing network affiliations	
December 1	Providence, Rhode Island	WJAR-TV	10.3	Comet	Charge!	See WLNE-TV entry in Stations changing network affiliations	
December 1	Providence, Rhode Island	WJAR-TV	10.4	Roar	Comet	See WLNE-TV entry in Stations changing network affiliations	
December 1	Reno, Nevada	KRNV-DT	4.3	Roar	Antenna TV	See KRNV entry in Stations changing network affiliations	
December 1	Reno, Nevada	KRXI-TV	11.2	Charge!	NBC	See KRNV entry in Stations changing network affiliations	
December 1	Reno, Nevada	KRXI-TV	11.3	Antenna TV	Charge!	See KRNV entry in Stations changing network affiliations	
December 1	Reno, Nevada	KRXI-TV	11.4	Rewind TV	—N/a	See KRNV entry in Stations changing network affiliations	
December 8	New Bern, North Carolina	WCTI-TV	12.2	Comet	Fox	See WYDO entry in Stations changing network affiliations	
December 8	New Bern, North Carolina	WCTI-TV	12.3	Roar	Comet	See WYDO entry in Stations changing network affiliations	
December 8	Portland, Maine	WGME-TV	13.2	Roar	Fox	See WPFO entry in Stations changing network affiliations	
December 8	Tri-Cities, Tennessee–Virginia	WCYB-TV	5.3	Comet	Fox	See WEMT entry in Stations changing network affiliations	
December 8	Tri-Cities, Tennessee–Virginia	WCYB-TV	5.4	True Crime Network	—N/a	See WEMT entry in Stations changing network affiliations	
December 8	Tri-Cities, Tennessee–Virginia	WCYB-TV	5.5	Rewind TV	—N/a	See WEMT entry in Stations changing network affiliations	
December 8	Tri-Cities, Tennessee–Virginia	WEMT	39.2	Roar	Comet	See WEMT entry in Stations changing network affiliations	
December 9	Chico–Redding, California	KRCR-TV	7.2	Roar	Fox	See KCVU entry in Stations changing network affiliations	
December 9	Eureka, California	KAEF-TV	23.2	Roar	Fox	See KBVU entry in Stations changing network affiliations	
December 10	Flint–Saginaw–Bay City–Midland, Michigan	WEYI-TV	25.2	The CW (via WBSF)	The Nest	See WEYI-TV entry in Stations changing network affiliations	
December 10	Flint–Saginaw–Bay City–Midland, Michigan	WEYI-TV	25.3	Roar	Quest	See WEYI-TV entry in Stations changing network affiliations	
December 10	Flint–Saginaw–Bay City–Midland, Michigan	WEYI-TV	25.4	Quest	—N/a	See WEYI-TV entry in Stations changing network affiliations	
December 10	Flint–Saginaw–Bay City–Midland, Michigan	WSMH	66.2	Antenna TV	NBC	See WEYI-TV entry in Stations changing network affiliations	
December 10	Flint–Saginaw–Bay City–Midland, Michigan	WSMH	66.4	The Nest	—N/a	See WEYI-TV entry in Stations changing network affiliations	
December 10	Gainesville, Florida	WGFL	28.3	Roar	NBC	See WNBW-DT entry in Stations changing network affiliations	
December 10	Gainesville, Florida	WGFL	28.4	The Nest	—N/a	See WNBW-DT entry in Stations changing network affiliations	

=== Station closures ===
Station	Channel	Affiliation	Market	Date	Notes	Source
KWSU-TV	10.1	PBS	Pullman, Washington	December 31	Washington State University and Northwest Public Broadcasting announced in October 2025 that KWSU-TV would cease operations on December 31; the closure followed the loss of federal funding for the Corporation for Public Broadcasting and a $1.8 million cut to NWPB's budget. NWPB's radio network and KTNW will continue operations; KWSU donors will retain access to PBS Passport via KTNW, and other PBS programming will remain available in the Pullman and Spokane areas via KSPS-TV and Idaho Public Television.	
