= KSAO-LD =

Television station in Sacramento, California

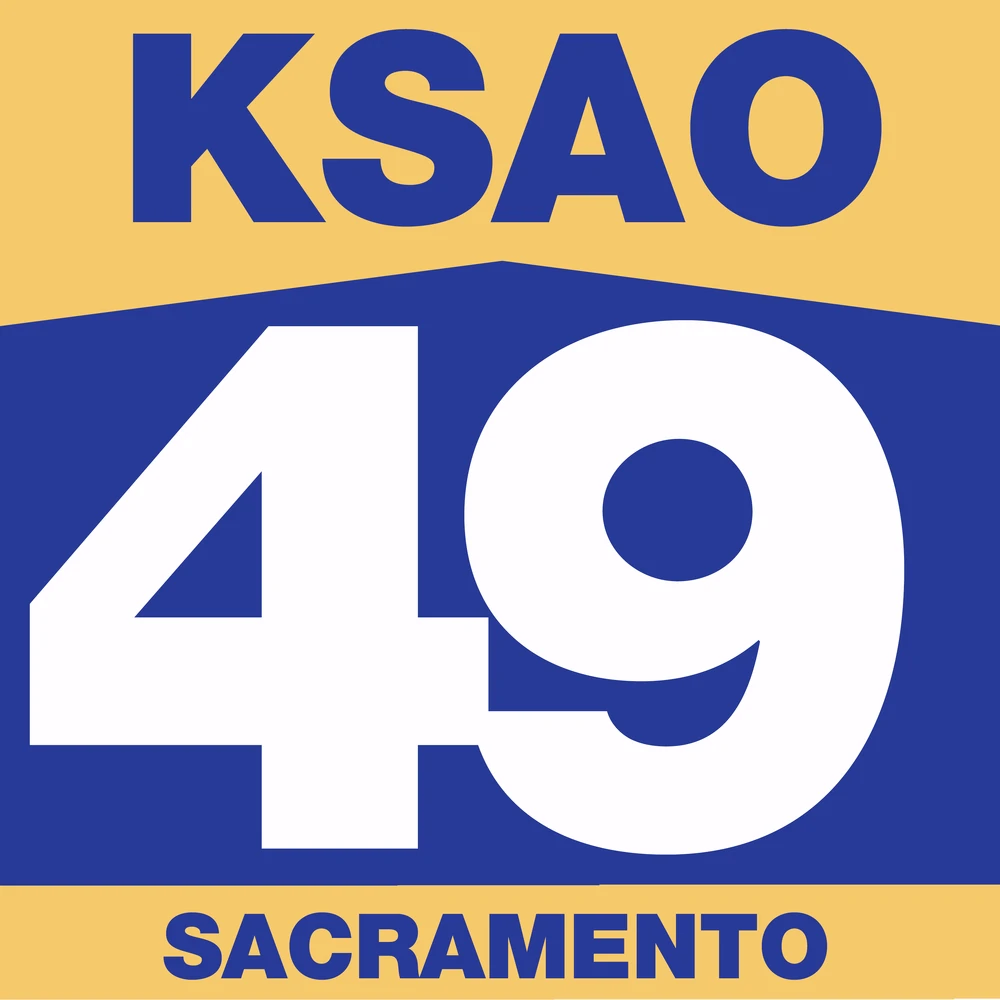
- Sacramento, California; United States
- Channels: Digital: 14 (UHF); Virtual: 49

Programming
- Affiliations: 49.1: Infomercials; for others, see § Subchannels

Ownership
- Owner: Bridge Media Networks; (Bridge News, LLC)

History
- Founded: August 1989
- Former call signs: K49DD (1992–1999); KSAO-LP (1999–2010)
- Former channel numbers: Analog: 49 (UHF, 1992–2010); Digital: 49 (UHF, 2010–2020)
- Former affiliations: HSN (2001–2005); Jewelry Television (2005–2009); Coastal Television Network (2009–2011); VMas (2011–2012); MundoFox/MundoMax (2012–2016); Azteca América (2016–2022); NewsNet (2023–2024); Fun Roads TV (2024); ShopHQ (2024–2025; 2025–2026); Binge TV (2025)
- Call sign meaning: "Sacramento"

Technical information
- Licensing authority: FCC
- Facility ID: 34578
- Class: LD
- ERP: 15 kW
- HAAT: 92.9 m (305 ft)

Links
- Public license information: LMS

KSAO-LD (channel 49) is a low-power television station in Sacramento, California, United States. The station is owned by Bridge Media Networks; KSAO-LD's transmitter is located on Crescent Ridge in El Dorado Hills, California.

== History ==
=== Affiliations with MundoFox/MundoMax and Azteca América ===
In August 2012, KSAO-LD became a charter affiliate of the Spanish-language network MundoFox. In July 2015, the network was relaunched as MundoMax after 21st Century Fox sold its stake of the network to RCN Televisión. MundoMax ceased operations on November 30, 2016. KSAO-LD affiliated with Azteca América the next day, taking over the affiliation from KSTV-LD (channel 32).

On December 31, 2022, Azteca América ceased operations, and the station affiliated with NewsNet the next day on January 1, 2023, effectively returning English language programming to the main channel since the early 2010s, but at the same time, KSAO-LD was dropped from local cable providers, such as Comcast's Xfinity. When KSAO-LD was affiliated with Azteca América from 2016 to 2022, its main channel was not carried by DirecTV and instead carried Azteca América owned-and-operated KEMO-DT2 in the San Francisco Bay Area due to KEMO's high-definition signal.

=== Sale to Bridge Media Networks and short NewsNet affiliation ===
On March 30, 2023, Bridge Media Networks, the parent company of NewsNet and Sports News Highlights (SNH), announced it would acquire KSAO-LD from Cocola Broadcasting and the company's six other stations for $3.2 million. The transaction was completed on May 15, 2023. As a result, KSAO-LD became a NewsNet owned-and-operated station for the Sacramento–Stockton–Modesto DMA.

On August 2, 2024, NewsNet and its sister network Sports News Highlights (on the station's second subchannel) were shut down due to low viewership and KSAO-LD affiliated with Fun Roads TV in the interim. It was later replaced by ShopHQ, with the network both on the main channel and the third subchannel (49.3). Fun Roads TV was switched to the second subchannel (49.2).

=== 2025–present ===
In April 2025, ShopHQ was dropped when the network ceased operations and the main channel affiliated with Binge TV, moving from the third subchannel where the network was added the month before. In December 2025, ShopHQ returned to the main channel as a revival of the original network, despite the network's new direction as a live streaming-only outlet. Binge TV was then moved to the twelfth subchannel (49.12). In 2026, ShopHQ programming was dropped and the main channel assumed airing infomercials full time.

== Technical information ==
=== Subchannels ===
KSAO-LD's transmitter is located on Crescent Ridge in El Dorado Hills, California. The station's signal is multiplexed:

Subchannels of KSAO-LD
Subchannel	Res.	Short name	Programming
49.1	480i	KSAO	Infomercials
49.2	480i	GodTV	GOD TV
49.3	480i	Bridge2	Infomercials
49.4	480i	JTV	Jewelry TV
49.5	480i	OAN	One America Plus
49.6	480i	Bridge1	Infomercials
49.7	480i	Sales	Infomercials
49.8	480i	BarkTV	Bark TV
49.9	480i	Shop	Infomercials
49.10	480i	FTF	FTF Sports
49.11	480i	MTRSPR1	MtrSpt1
49.12	480i	Binge	Binge TV
49.13	480i	SnapSHP	Infomercials
49.14	480i	DrOz	Oz TV
49.15	480i	Bein	beIN Sports Xtra
49.16	480i	AWSN	All Women's Sports Network

Subchannel broadcast with MPEG-4 video

=== Subchannel affiliations ===
KSAO-LD was affiliated with Bounce TV on subchannel 49.2 until March 2013, when Bounce was switched over to KUVS-DT subchannel 19.3 as part of a distribution agreement with Univision Communications (now TelevisaUnivision), owner of KUVS.

KSAO was affiliated with TheCoolTV on subchannel 49.2 until April 2016 when it was dropped and replaced by Retro TV. As part of an affiliation deal with Retro TV's parent company Luken Communications (now Get After It Media), it also included the addition of Rev'n on subchannel 49.5. Both channels were dropped in 2018. Retro TV and Rev'n (now Rev'n Action) returned to the market on KSTV-LD (channel 32) in 2025 on subchannels 32.2 and 32.3 (now 32.4), respectively.

A simulcast of former Azteca América affiliate KSTV-LP (channel 32) aired on subchannel 49.3 until the simulcast was dropped in early 2016. The channel remained silent for a short time until May 11, 2016, when it was affiliated with Buzzr, a broadcast television network airing classic game shows.

On October 28, 2019, KSAO-LD became the third station in the Sacramento television market to affiliate with This TV on subchannel 49.2, after having previous subchannel affiliations with KQCA (subchannel 58.2) and KTXL (subchannel 40.3).

Shortly after KSAO-LD took on the NewsNet affiliation, NewsNet's sister network, Sports News Highlights, was added on subchannel 49.6 (previously occupied by SonLife Broadcasting Network). It was moved to subchannel 49.2 in September 2023 when the station dropped This TV. Buzzr on 49.3 and Shop LC on 49.5 were also dropped, removing the last remaining subchannels from the station's tenure under Cocola Broadcasting ownership. This TV has since ceased operations and Buzzr is currently on KBTV-CD (channel 8).

In December 2024, Fun Roads TV on the second subchannel (49.2) was dropped and was replaced by infomercials, while the duplicated ShopHQ on the third subchannel (49.3) was switched to a sister channel, dubbed the "Best of ShopHQ." In late 2024, a series of subchannels were added, including One America News Network, Ace TV, AWE, Bark TV, Right Now TV, FTF Sports, and MtrSpt1. National Black Television, or NBT, was added in early 2025.

In February 2025, the "Best of ShopHQ" was dropped and the subchannel affiliated with beIN Sports Xtra; the network moved to the sixth subchannel (49.6) a month later in March 2025. In August 2025, Right Now TV on the ninth subchannel (49.9) was dropped, replaced by Z Living, which was added earlier in June on the fourteenth subchannel (49.14). In September 2025, Ace TV on the fourth subchannel (49.4) was dropped and was replaced by All Women's Sports Network, or AWSN. Oz TV, which airs past episodes of The Dr. Oz Show, was added on the fourteenth subchannel (49.14). In October 2025, In Touch+, the 24/7 channel from In Touch Ministries, is added on the sixth subchannel (49.6), with beIN Sports Xtra moving once again, this time to the station's fifteenth subchannel (49.15). In December 2025, Binge TV moved from the main channel to the twelfth subchannel (49.12), dropping AWE.

In April 2026, InTouch+ on the sixth subchannel (49.6) is dropped, replaced by YTA. In May 2026, NBT on the thirteenth subchannel (49.13) is dropped, replaced by infomercials. In August 2026, AWSN moves to the sixteenth subchannel (49.16). In September 2026, GOD TV is added on the second subchannel (49.2) and Jewelry Television is added on the fourth subchannel (49.4), moving infomercials on these channels to the sixth (49.6) and ninth (49.9) subchannels, dropping YTA and Z Living, respectively.
