= KPXR-TV =

Television station in Cedar Rapids, Iowa

- Cedar Rapids–Waterloo–; Iowa City–Dubuque, Iowa; United States
- City: Cedar Rapids, Iowa
- Channels: Digital: 22 (UHF); Virtual: 48

Programming
- Affiliations: 48.1: Ion Television; for others, see § Subchannels

Ownership
- Owner: Ion Media; (Ion Media License Company, LLC)

History
- First air date: May 3, 1997
- Former call signs: KTVC (1997–1998)
- Former channel numbers: Analog: 48 (UHF, 1997–2009); Digital: 47 (UHF, until 2018)
- Former affiliations: inTV (1997–1998)
- Call sign meaning: Pax Cedar Rapids

Technical information
- Licensing authority: FCC
- Facility ID: 21156
- ERP: 215 kW
- HAAT: 451 m (1,480 ft)
- Transmitter coordinates: 42°17′43″N 91°53′11″W

Links
- Public license information: Public file; LMS
- Website: iontelevision.com

KPXR-TV (channel 48) is a television station licensed to Cedar Rapids, Iowa, United States, broadcasting the Ion Television network to Eastern Iowa. It is owned by the Ion Media subsidiary of the E. W. Scripps Company, and maintains offices on Blairs Ferry Road Northeast in Cedar Rapids and a transmitter near Walker, Iowa.

== History ==
The station first signed on the air on May 3, 1997, as KTVC; it was originally an affiliate of the Infomall TV Network (inTV), a service operated by Paxson Communications that specialized in paid programming. On August 31, 1998, KPXR became a charter station of the family-oriented Pax TV network (later reformatted into a general entertainment service as i: Independent Television, now Ion Television), with religious programming from The Worship Network airing during the overnight hours.

On September 24, 2020, the Cincinnati-based E. W. Scripps Company announced it would purchase KPXR-TV's owner, Ion Media, for $2.65 billion, with financing from Berkshire Hathaway. Part of the deal included divesting 23 stations nationally to Inyo Broadcast Holdings (then-undisclosed at the time of the announcement) that would maintain Ion affiliations.

In June 2026, KPXR Upgraded the video signal for Game Show Central on channel 48.7 to MPEG-4, requiring newer TVs in order to decode the signal.

== Subchannels ==
The station's signal is multiplexed:

Subchannels of KPXR-TV
| Channel | Res. | Short name | Programming |
|---|---|---|---|
| 48.1 | 720p | ION | Ion Television |
| 48.2 | 480i | Grit | Grit |
| 48.3 | 480i | Bounce | Bounce TV |
| 48.4 | 480i | Laff | Laff |
| 48.5 | 480i | IONPlus | Ion Plus |
| 48.6 | 480i | BUSTED | Busted |
| 48.7 | 480i (MPEG-4) | GameSho | Game Show Central |
| 48.8 | 480i | HSN | HSN |
| 48.9 | 480i | QVC | QVC |
