= WJFB =

Television station in Lebanon, Tennessee

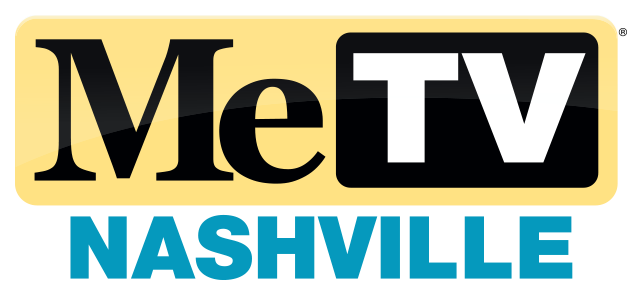
- Lebanon–Nashville, Tennessee; United States
- City: Lebanon, Tennessee
- Channels: Digital: 25 (UHF); Virtual: 44
- Branding: MeTV Nashville

Programming
- Affiliations: 44.1: MeTV; for others, see § Subchannels

Ownership
- Owner: Weigel Broadcasting; (WJFB-TV LLC)

History
- First air date: July 8, 1987
- Former channel numbers: Analog: 66 (UHF, 1988–2009); Digital: 44 (UHF, 2009–2019); Translators: WJFB-LP 11 Lebanon, TN; WKUW-LD 40 White House, TN
- Former affiliations: Pursuit Channel; Youtoo TV; America One; Jewelry Television; ShopNBC; Shop at Home Network; Military Channel; American Independent Network; The Weather Channel; TCT (44.1 2015–2019, 44.6 2019–2020); Light TV (44.3 2017–2019, 44.7 2019–2020)
- Call sign meaning: Dr. Joe F. Bryant (founding owner)

Technical information
- Licensing authority: FCC
- Facility ID: 7651
- ERP: 1,000 kW
- HAAT: 407 m (1,335 ft)
- Transmitter coordinates: 36°16′4.9″N 86°47′44.7″W

Links
- Public license information: Public file; LMS
- Website: WJFB page on MeTV.com

WJFB (channel 44) is a television station licensed to Lebanon, Tennessee, United States. Owned by Weigel Broadcasting, the station serves as an outlet for the company's suite of over-the-air broadcast networks in the Nashville market, with its flagship network MeTV carried on its primary channel. WJFB's transmitter is located in Whites Creek, Tennessee, just off I-24 and Old Hickory Boulevard, and the station is operated out of Weigel's Chicago headquarters, with no local presence in either Nashville or Lebanon.

== History ==
The station signed on the air on July 8, 1987, broadcasting on UHF channel 66. Prior to the digital television transition, WJFB aired programming from different networks over the years, including The Weather Channel, American Independent Network, America One, The Military Channel, Shop at Home Network, ShopNBC, Jewelry Television, Youtoo TV and Pursuit Channel. The station also broadcast several local sports events and regional sports through America One. These included local auto racing, local high school football, University of Tennessee at Martin (UT Martin) football and basketball, Cincinnati Reds baseball (by way of SportsChannel Cincinnati) and Showtime All-Star Wrestling. The station also broadcast the Lebanon Christmas Parade for several years before it moved to local public access channels. The station once aired a morning news program, TV 66 Morning Report Live, hosted by the station's then-owner Joe F. Bryant, which aired weekdays from 7 to 7:30 a.m. It featured news headlines as well as weather forecasts, traffic reports, local sports, and telephone calls from viewers. Bryant's terminal illness led to the cancellation of the program, as he died on October 10, 2011. WJFB continued to be operated by his surviving family members. Local church services, the main locally originated programming, were also aired on Sunday mornings on the main channel until August 31, 2014, when they also moved to the cable-only access channels.

On February 4, 2013, WJFB reduced Jewelry Television programming on its main subchannel to an hour per day from 10 to 11 a.m., since the network was available 24 hours a day on Nashville/Lebanon area cable providers and was considered a secondary affiliation. The station then relied on America One for all of its programming. (Jewelry Television was still listed in the internet and electronic programming guides as broadcasting 24 hours a day until about mid-April 2013, when the information was updated to feature only America One programming on WJFB.)

On September 1, 2014, WJFB became an affiliate of the Pursuit Channel. WJFB broadcast its programming around the clock except on Saturday mornings when it aired educational and informational (E/I) programming through America One (and later Youtoo TV as of January 2015) to help meet Federal Communications Commission (FCC) requirements. America One programming was still carried full-time on WJFB's second digital subchannel until it merged with Youtoo TV in September 2014. Programming from Youtoo TV was also broadcast on WJFB's second digital subchannel until April 1, 2015, when the affiliation was discontinued and replaced with a standard-definition television (SD) simulcast of the main channel.

WJFB moved the Pursuit Channel programming from its main to its second subchannel on April 3, 2015. The main subchannel flipped to Tri-State Christian Television (TCT), which broadcast religious programming 24 hours a day. WJFB discontinued all Youtoo TV programming—including its E/I programming—ending the affiliation. WJFB then broadcast E/I programming from TCT Kids on its main and second digital subchannels to help meet FCC requirements. However, on April 13, 2015, the Pursuit Channel affiliation was discontinued entirely and its programming dropped from the second subchannel and replaced with an HD feed of TCT Network, branded as TCT-HD. On May 21, 2015, Bryant Broadcasting announced they were selling WJFB and W11BD to Dove Broadcasting, Inc. (a subsidiary of Tri-State Christian Television). The sale was finalized on August 17, 2015. On September 3, 2015, TCT-HD was replaced with TCT Family on WJFB's main digital subchannel, while TCT Kids was placed on its second subchannel.

Dove Broadcasting announced they were transferring control of WJFB and sister translator WJFB-LP, to Radiant Life Ministries, Inc., another TCT subsidiary on March 8, 2017. On August 30, 2017, WJFB launched MGM Television's family-oriented subchannel network Light TV on channel 44.3. Under TCT ownership, the station maintained studios on Music Circle in Nashville until it ended local operations in June 2018. On September 18, 2018, it was announced that Tri-State Christian Television was selling WJFB to HC2 Holdings for $5,750,000. The sale was finalized on May 3, 2019. TCT continued to operate the station under a local marketing agreement (LMA). WJFB-LP was not included in the sale.

On September 23, 2019, WJFB picked up all five of WKUW-LD's subchannels, owned by Weigel Broadcasting: MeTV on DT1, Heroes & Icons on DT2, Start TV on DT3, Decades on DT4 and Movies! on DT5. TCT and Light TV retained subchannel space on the signal, with TCT on DT6 and Light TV on DT7.

On September 11, 2020, Weigel announced that it was buying WJFB from HC2 for $5.5 million. WKUW-LD was not included in the sale. The sale was completed on November 11. On that day, both TCT and Light TV were dropped from the station's sixth and seventh subchannels. DT6 displayed a test pattern, indicating a new subchannel was coming soon, while DT7 went blank until the March 28, 2022, launch of Story Television. However on April 1, 2021, DT6 was deactivated and was blank until MeTV+ became available on September 27, 2021.

On November 27, 2020, WJFB applied to the FCC to relocate its transmitter from Lebanon to Whites Creek, Tennessee (a location in Davidson County just north of Nashville proper), and to also increase its power to 1,000 kW to cover the Middle Tennessee area and better serve Nashville proper, as opposed to being best viewable only in the eastern suburbs. The station filed for a license to cover on May 26, 2021. WJFB officially began broadcasting from its new transmitter on May 23, 2021.

== Technical information ==
=== Subchannels ===
The station's signal is multiplexed:

Subchannels of WJFB
Subchannel	Res.	Short name	Programming
44.1	720p	MeTV	MeTV
44.2	480i	HEROES	Heroes & Icons
44.3	480i	START	Start TV
44.4	480i	CATCHY	Catchy Comedy
44.5	480i	MOVIES	Movies!
44.6	480i	WEST	WEST
44.7	480i	STORY	Story Television
44.8	480i	TOONS	MeTV Toons
44.9	480i	DABL	Dabl
44.10	480i	MeTV+	MeTV+

=== Analog-to-digital conversion ===
WJFB shut down its analog signal, over UHF channel 66, on June 12, 2009, the date on which full-power television stations in the United States transitioned from analog to digital broadcasts under federal mandate. The station's digital signal continued to broadcast on its pre-transition UHF channel 44.

=== Former translators ===
Prior to the digital transition, WJFB relayed its signal on a low-power translator station originally under the call sign W11BD in Lebanon. That station signed on in December 1985, carrying the same programming from WJFB (except for city council meetings), and signed off sometime in 2009 during the digital television transition. There were three construction permits active for the translator: one to convert the translator station to digital broadcasting, another to return the station translator to the air, and a third to relocate the translator station to digital channel 18 when the conversion to digital for the translator station was to be completed. On June 2, 2016, the call sign for W11BD was changed to WJFB-LP to match the call sign for the full-powered sister station WJFB. WJFB-LP was silent while TCT evaluated plans for the translator; however, as a result of being off the air for more than 180 days and due to years of inactivity, WJFB-LP's broadcast license and digital construction permit was canceled by the FCC on August 22, 2019, and TCT decided to surrender the translator's license to the FCC.

From September 21, 2019, to May 30, 2021, under HC2 ownership, WJFB relayed its signal on low-power sister station WKUW-LD (channel 40). This mirrored the channel lineup of then-sister station WJFB, although WJFB continued to run TCT programming on its sixth subchannel and Light TV on its seventh subchannel until 2020. When WJFB relocated its transmitter to Whites Creek and increased its power, WKUW-LD discontinued simulcasting WJFB's five subchannels on May 30, 2021, and briefly became a translator to WCTZ-LD, but returned to being a stand-alone LPTV station a month later on June 23.
