= KOPX-TV =

Television station in Oklahoma City

- Oklahoma City, Oklahoma; United States
- Channels: Digital: 18 (UHF); Virtual: 62

Programming
- Affiliations: 62.1: Ion Television; for others, see § Subchannels

Ownership
- Owner: Inyo Broadcast Holdings (sale to the E. W. Scripps Company pending); (Inyo Broadcast Licenses LLC)

History
- First air date: March 16, 1996
- Former call signs: KMNZ (1996–1998)
- Former channel numbers: Analog: 62 (UHF, 1996–2009); Digital: 50 (UHF, 2002–2019)
- Former affiliations: inTV (1996–1998)
- Call sign meaning: Oklahoma's Pax TV

Technical information
- Licensing authority: FCC
- Facility ID: 2566
- ERP: 200 kW
- HAAT: 467.26 m (1,533.01 ft)
- Transmitter coordinates: 35°34′7″N 97°29′21″W

Links
- Public license information: Public file; LMS
- Website: iontelevision.com

KOPX-TV (channel 62) is a television station in Oklahoma City, Oklahoma, United States, affiliated with Ion Television. Owned by Inyo Broadcast Holdings, the station maintains offices on Railway Drive in north Oklahoma City, and its transmitter is located near 122nd Street on the city's northeast side.

== History ==
The station first signed on the air on March 16, 1996, as KMNZ; it was originally an affiliate of the Infomall TV Network (inTV), a service operated by Paxson Communications that specialized in paid programming. On August 31, 1998, KOPX became a charter station of the family-oriented Pax TV network (later reformatted into a general entertainment service as i: Independent Television, now Ion Television), with religious programming from The Worship Network airing during the overnight hours.

== Newscasts ==
In November 2002, in relation to agreements between Pax TV and several major network affiliates (most of which were affiliated with NBC, which held a minority interest in Pax), KOPX began airing tape delayed rebroadcasts of morning and late evening newscasts from NBC affiliate KFOR-TV (channel 4). The 6 a.m. hour of the morning newscast aired on a one-hour tape delay (at 7 a.m.), while the 10 p.m. newscast aired on a half-hour delay (at 10:30 p.m.), with the latter beginning shortly before the live 10 p.m. newscast on KFOR-TV ended. The news share agreement ended on June 30, 2005 (coinciding with Pax's rebranding as i: Independent Television), due to Paxson Communications' decision to discontinue carriage of network affiliate newscasts as a result of Pax's financial troubles.

== Technical information ==
=== Subchannels ===
The station's signal is multiplexed:

Subchannels of KOPX-TV
Channel	Res.	Short name	Programming
62.1	720p	ION	Ion Television
62.2	720p	Bounce	Bounce TV
62.3	480i	CourtTV	Court TV
62.4	480i	MOVIES!	Movies!
62.5	480i	BUSTED	Busted
62.6	480i	GameSho	Game Show Central
62.7	480i	Oxygen	Oxygen
62.8	480i	HSN	HSN
62.9	480i	ShopLC	Shop LC

=== Analog-to-digital conversion ===
KOPX-TV began transmitting a digital television signal on UHF channel 50 on November 1, 2002. The station ended regular programming on its analog signal, over UHF channel 62, on June 12, 2009, as part of the federally mandated transition from analog to digital television. The station's digital signal remained on its pre-transition UHF channel 50, using virtual channel 62.

As a part of the repacking process following the 2016–2017 FCC incentive auction, KOPX-TV relocated to UHF channel 18 in 2019.
