= KPXD-TV =

Television station in Arlington, Texas

- Arlington–Fort Worth–Dallas, Texas; United States
- City: Arlington, Texas
- Channels: Digital: 25 (UHF); Virtual: 68

Programming
- Affiliations: 68.1: Ion Television; for others, see § Subchannels

Ownership
- Owner: Ion Media; (Ion Media License Company, LLC)

History
- First air date: December 21, 1996
- Former call signs: KINZ (1996–1998)
- Former channel numbers: Analog: 68 (UHF, 1996–2009); Digital: 42 (UHF, 2000–2019)
- Former affiliations: inTV (1996–1998)
- Call sign meaning: Pax TV Dallas (former network branding)

Technical information
- Licensing authority: FCC
- Facility ID: 68834
- ERP: 1,000 kW
- HAAT: 371.2 m (1,218 ft)
- Transmitter coordinates: 32°35′25″N 96°58′24″W

Links
- Public license information: Public file; LMS
- Website: iontelevision.com

KPXD-TV (channel 68) is a television station licensed to Arlington, Texas, United States, serving as the Ion Television outlet for the Dallas–Fort Worth metroplex. Owned by the Ion Media subsidiary of the E. W. Scripps Company, the station has offices on Six Flags Drive in Arlington, and its transmitter is located in Cedar Hill, Texas.

== History ==
The station first signed on the air on December 21, 1996, as KINZ-TV (in reference to its original affiliation with the Infomall TV Network (InTV), the predecessor-of-sorts of Ion Television), carrying infomercials for much of its schedule and programming from religious broadcaster The Worship Network during the overnight hours. The station was to have originally given the call letters KAQV in its construction permit to operate the station, which were changed prior to its sign-on. In early 1998, Paxson Communications (the forerunner to Ion Media) bought the station, and changed its call letters to KPXD-TV on January 13; the station became a charter owned-and-operated station of Paxson's new family-oriented broadcast network Pax TV (now Ion Television) when the network launched on August 31, 1998.

KPXD "Pax 68" logo, used from 1998 to 2005.

As part of a wide-ranging deal that gave NBC partial ownership of Pax, the former network's owned-and-operated stations as well as many of its affiliates provided sales and marketing assistance for Pax TV stations in several markets, with KPXD entering into a joint sales agreement with KXAS-TV (channel 5; which NBC had owned 76% interest in at the time, it is now owned by the network outright).

In 2003, Pax TV decided to scale back its programming due to financial losses, resulting in much of the afternoon time slots on its stations' schedules being filled with infomercials. After Pax was rebranded as i: Independent Television on June 30, 2005, Worship Network programming moved to one of KPXD's digital subchannels (originally its third subchannel, then to its fourth subchannel after Ion Life (later Ion Plus) and Qubo launched, before Worship was dropped on January 31, 2010).

In September 2020, Ion Media was sold to the E. W. Scripps Company, marking the latter company's first entry into the Dallas–Fort Worth market. On February 27, 2021, shortly after the sale closed, Ion Plus and Qubo ceased broadcasting, and KPXD-DT2 and DT3 switched to Court TV and Grit, sharing the affiliations with KDAF (channel 33) and KSTR-DT (channel 49) respectively. The next day, KPXD-DT4 switched from Ion Shop to Laff, sharing the affiliation with KUVN-DT (channel 23). On June 28, 2021, Court TV was removed from KPXD-DT2, and replaced with Bounce TV, sharing the affiliation with KUVN-DT. On that same day, QVC and HSN were removed from KPXD-DT5 and KPXD-DT6 respectively, and began showing previews of Scripps-owned Reality TV networks Defy TV and TrueReal respectively. Both networks launched on July 1, 2021. On October 1, 2021, Newsy was added to channel KPXD-DT7.

== Newscasts ==
In September 2001, as part of the JSA with that station, KPXD began airing tape delayed rebroadcasts of NBC station KXAS-TV's 6 and 10 p.m. newscasts each Monday through Friday evening at 6:30 and 10:30 p.m. (the latter beginning shortly before that program's live broadcast ended on KXAS). The news rebroadcasts ended in 2003, two years before most of the network's other news share agreements with Pax TV stations were terminated upon the network's rebranding as i: Independent Television, as a result of the network's financial troubles.

== Technical information ==
=== Subchannels ===
The station's signal is multiplexed:

Subchannels of KPXD-TV
Subchannel	Res.	Short name	Programming
68.1	720p	ION	Ion Television
68.2	480i	IONPlus	Ion Plus
68.3	480i	Laff	Laff
68.4	480i	DEFY	Defy
68.5	480i	Grit	Busted
68.6	480i	GameSho	Game Show Central
68.7	480i	QVC365	QVC 365
68.8	480i	HSN	HSN

Subchannel broadcast with MPEG-4 video

=== Analog-to-digital conversion ===
KPXD-TV shut down its analog signal, over UHF channel 68, on June 12, 2009, as part of the federally mandated transition from analog to digital television. The station's digital signal remained on its pre-transition UHF channel 42, using virtual channel 68.
