= Cannella Media =

American media company

Cannella Media DTC, L.L.C.
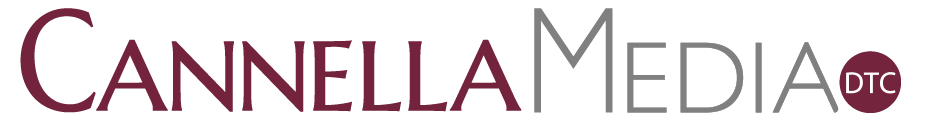
- Industry: Mass media
- Founded: 1985; 41 years ago
- Founder: Frank Cannella
- Headquarters: Burlington, Wisconsin, U.S.
- Area served: United States
- Key people: Rob Medved (CEO) Bill Raymond (EVP, Managing Partner)
- Website: www.cannellamedia.com

Cannella Media DTC, L.L.C., formerly Cannella Response Television LLC is an American advertising and media-buying company specializing in direct-response and direct-to-consumer campaigns based in Burlington, Wisconsin, United States. It is the largest direct-response television advertising agency. Rob Medved is the chief executive officer of the company.

Frank Cannella founded the company in Wisconsin in 1985 as Cannella Response Television. The company initially focused on buying television airtime for long-form advertisements and later expanded into short-form and programmatic television. In 2016, it acquired Media Properties Holdings, whose businesses included AdMore and REVShare.

The company describes its current services as media buying across video, digital and audio, along with campaign development, creative production and data analytics.

== History ==
Cannella Media was founded by Frank Cannella in 1985. He received Bravo! Entrepreneur Award in 2006 for his contributions to the media industry.

In 2005, Cannella acquired a Los Angeles-based firm which specializes in buying airtime.

In June 2009, Cannella received an investment from private equity firms ZM Capital and Palladium Equity Partners.

In May 2011, Cannella moved to the new headquarters in Burlington.

In January 2016, Cannella acquired Media Properties Holdings and was renamed Cannella Media, LLC.

== Operations ==
Cannella Media is buyer of television airtime for direct-to-consumer performance marketing campaigns. It coordinates the buying of airtime for its clients, and created over-the-air television networks mainly featuring low-cost or public domain content with their commercial breaks featuring direct response television advertising it brokered. Innovate Corp. stations (formerly HC2 Holdings/DTV America) form the bulk of the nationwide affiliate base for these channels. Late night periods on all of their networks feature paid programming.

The company's networks include;

- Binge TV, a network featuring binge viewing-focused scheduling of one series per day.
- Carz & Trax, which features films, series and current-day programming tailored to automotive enthusiasts.
- CRTV, or Cable Response Television, with a mix of brokered home shopping blocks from other programmers and paid programming; absorbed into OnTV4U after a short time.
- Magnificent Movies Network, which features older and public domain-films.
- OnTV4U, which features a schedule entirely made up of paid programming, and is Cannella's first and oldest network.
- RVTV, programming focused on recreational vehicles and the outdoors.
- Timeless TV, featuring public domain sitcom episodes.
