= Ace TV =

American television network

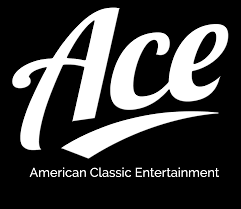
- Country: United States
- Broadcast area: National

Ownership
- Owner: Aspen Hill Media Group

History
- Launched: 2018; 7 years ago

Links
- Website: www.acetelevisionnetwork.com

Ace TV (American Classic Entertainment Television) is an American family-oriented television network featuring television programming consisting of drama, sports, movies, entertainment, and other features, much of it repackaged from off-network and first-run syndication. Ace TV was founded in 2018 provides programming to television stations in the United States, especially low-power television stations since 2019. Ace TV can be found on Roku.

== Programming ==
Current programming on Ace TV includes:

- Acapulco H.E.A.T.
- Cold Squad
- Cracker
- Forensic Factor
- The Greatest American Hero
- Hawkeye
- Heartland
- The Listener
- Mike Hammer
- Mom P.I.
- Silk Stalkings
- Stoney Burke
- Tarzan
- Tropical Heat

=== Sports ===
Ace TV carries broadcasts of Total Combat and Extreme Fighting Championship (EFC) mixed martial arts (MMA) each week.
