= TBN Salsa =

American Christian television network, 2015-2019

- Country: United States
- Broadcast area: Nationwide
- Headquarters: Tustin, California

Programming
- Language: English
- Picture format: 480i (SDTV)

Ownership
- Owner: Trinity Broadcasting Network
- Sister channels: Trinity Broadcasting Network; Enlace TBN; TBN Inspire; Positiv; Smile

History
- Launched: June 1, 2015; 11 years ago
- Closed: May 1, 2019; 7 years ago (OTA affiliations only)

Links
- Website: www.tbn-salsa.org

TBN Salsa was an American Christian-based digital broadcast television network owned by the Trinity Broadcasting Network. The network offered a mix of religious and family-oriented programming aimed at English-speaking Hispanic Americans (which served as a complement to the Spanish-language Enlace, which TBN distributes in the United States).

The network was available as a 24-hour-a-day service distributed primarily on cable and satellite providers in select markets. It was the only U.S.-based TBN network that was not available for livestreaming on TBN's website and mobile app.

== History ==
On April 24, 2015, the Trinity Broadcasting Network announced that it would launch TBN Salsa, described as a "faith-and-family network" aimed toward English-speaking second- and third-generation Hispanics, as well as non-Hispanic viewers interested in the Latin American culture and faith community. The network was co-founded by TBN president Matthew Crouch and Laurie Crouch, with Samuel Rodriguez (president of the National Hispanic Christian Leadership Conference) serving as a key advisor in the network's development. The network initially debuted on the 38 stations owned directly by the Trinity Broadcasting Network and through its subsidiary Community Educational Television (including markets with large Hispanic and Latino populations such as Los Angeles, New York City, Chicago, Miami, Atlanta, Dallas-Fort Worth, Philadelphia, Phoenix, Denver, Indianapolis, Nashville and Houston).

Due to technical limitations with its stations' existing digital compression equipment, TBN opted to launch TBN Salsa on the subchannel previously occupied by Smile of a Child TV, collapsing that network (which was aimed at children 2 to 12 years of age) into a single subchannel with sister network JUCE TV (which targeted teenagers and young adults 13 to 30 years of age) under a timeshare arrangement, with a reduced schedule of Smile programming airing daily from 6:00 a.m. to 3:00 p.m. Eastern Time on the third subchannel occupied by JUCE (Smile of a Child and JUCE continued to maintain 24-hour-day schedules, with programs not seen on the subchannel available on their respective streams on TBN's website, mobile and digital media players, and select cable and satellite providers).

TBN Salsa formally launched at 7:08 p.m. Eastern Time on June 1, 2015, with a 60-second promo reel previewing the network. This was followed by the network's inaugural program, a special live broadcast of TBN flagship program Praise the Lord from the network's Dream Center studio in Los Angeles' Echo Park neighborhood (hosted by Matthew and Laurie Crouch, and Samuel Rodriguez), with additional location segments conducted from Miami, Seattle and New York City.

On May 1, 2019, TBN Salsa was removed from the DT5 feed of TBN's O&O broadcast stations, replacing it with a placeholder standard definition feed of the main TBN signal until it was replaced on January 1, 2020, by a 24-hour feed of JUCE TV until that network was replaced by TBN's Christian film-oriented network Positiv on January 26, 2020.

== Programming ==
TBN Salsa carried a broad mix of ministry, Christian teaching and contemporary worship programs featuring Hispanic pastors and Christian leaders from the United States and Latin America; Contemporary Christian and gospel music programs featuring Latino musicians and recording artists; topical talk shows highlighting issues relating to the Hispanic Americans; documentaries; sports programs; faith-based and family-oriented feature films; specials; and children's programs. The network also broadcast Salsa Praise (formerly Praise the Lord: Salsa Style), which was a version of TBN's flagship program Praise.
