= WPGD-TV =

Television station in Hendersonville, Tennessee

- Hendersonville–Nashville, Tennessee; United States
- City: Hendersonville, Tennessee
- Channels: Digital: 33 (UHF); Virtual: 50

Programming
- Affiliations: 50.1: TBN; for others, see § Subchannels

Ownership
- Owner: Trinity Broadcasting Network; (Trinity Broadcasting of Texas, Inc.)

History
- Founded: September 17, 1987
- First air date: September 24, 1992
- Former call signs: WPGD (1992–2003)
- Former channel numbers: Analog: 50 (UHF, 1992-2009); Digital: 51 (UHF, 2003-2009)
- Call sign meaning: "We Praise God Daily"

Technical information
- Licensing authority: FCC
- Facility ID: 60820
- ERP: 1,000 kW
- HAAT: 412 m (1,352 ft)
- Transmitter coordinates: 36°16′3″N 86°47′44″W

Links
- Public license information: Public file; LMS
- Website: www.tbn.org

WPGD-TV (channel 50) is a religious television station licensed to Hendersonville, Tennessee, United States, serving the Nashville area. The station is owned by the Trinity Broadcasting Network (TBN).

WPGD-TV's studios are located at Trinity Music City on Music Village Boulevard in Hendersonville, the former estate of the late country artist Conway Twitty; its studios and auditorium have also served as a recording location for TBN programs. The station's transmitter is located in Whites Creek, Tennessee, just off I-24 and Old Hickory Boulevard.

== History ==
Although it was granted a construction permit on September 17, 1987, the station did not sign on the air until September 24, 1992, with its original analog transmitter located along State Highway 109 in unincorporated Sumner County between Portland and Gallatin. It was built and signed on by Sonlight Broadcasting Systems, a broadcast ministry based in Mobile, Alabama, and co-founded by television producer Paul Crouch Jr. and attorney and broadcaster Jay Sekulow. At the time of the station's inception, all of Sonlight's stations were affiliated with TBN, which was co-founded by Paul Crouch Jr.'s parents Paul Sr. and Jan. As a TBN affiliate, WPGD carried most of the network's schedule while opting out at times to air alternate programming, some of which was produced locally.

In 1997, WPGD was sold, along with the rest of Sonlight's stations, to All American TV (not to be confused with an unrelated television syndication company of a similar name), a minority-owned firm with close ties to TBN; the sale to All American made the station a full-fledged affiliate of the network. WPGD became a TBN owned-and-operated station in 2000, when TBN purchased all of All American's stations.

== Technical information ==
=== Subchannels ===
The station's signal is multiplexed:

Subchannels of WPGD-TV
Subchannel	Res.	Short name	Programming
50.1	720p	TBN HD	TBN
50.2	720p	TVDEALS	Infomercials
50.3	480i	Inspire	TBN Inspire
50.4	480i	ONTV4U	OnTV4U (infomercials) (4:3)
50.5	480i	POSITIV	Positiv

TBN-owned full-power stations permanently ceased analog transmissions on April 16, 2009.

=== Former translator ===
At one point during the 1990s, WPGD also operated a low-power translator, W36AK, serving Nashville proper due to the main transmitter's location, until it was discontinued at an unknown date.
