= Praise (TV program) =

Christian-oriented TV talk program

- Also known as: Praise the Lord (1973-2016)
- Genre: Christian
- Presented by: Matt Crouch; Laurie Crouch; Sheila Walsh
- Narrated by: Jim McClellan, Reggie Duff, Various TBN announcers
- Theme music composer: Bill Gaither & Gloria Gaither; Rich Cook; Tre’ Corley
- Opening theme: Let Everything With Breath (Praise Theme) (1981-1992) Praise the Lord (1992-2016)
- Ending theme: Let Everything with Breath (Praise Theme) (1981-1992): Praise the Lord (1992-2016)
- Country of origin: United States

Production
- Running time: 60 minutes 30 minutes 90 minutes

Original release
- Network: TBN
- Release: May 28, 1973 – present

Praise (a shortened version of its original title Praise the Lord) is a Christian-oriented television talk program which is the flagship program of the Trinity Broadcasting Network (TBN), airing every weeknight in primetime. TBN president Matt Crouch and his wife Laurie serve as the primary hosts of the show. On November 14, 2016, the title was changed to the shortened title Praise.

== Premise ==
Originally hosted by TBN founders Paul and Jan Crouch, and later by Paul Crouch Jr., the program features a mix of interviews with celebrities and other performers discussing faith-based topics and their personal relationship with faith, and music performances from various gospel and contemporary Christian artists. It was originally 2 hours, which shifted to 90 minutes, as well as moved to a new timeslot, 8 and 11 p.m. Eastern. The program usually originates from the network's Trinity Christian City campus in Costa Mesa, California, though other episodes also originate from TBN's facilities in Irving, Texas, the Trinity Music City complex in Hendersonville, Tennessee, and the Holy Land Experience in Orlando, Florida, until its closing in March 2020.

localized version Praise the Lord is utilized by TBN's owned-and-operated stations and affiliates to fulfill local or educational programming requirements.

== Theme and announcer ==
Jim McClellan has served as the program's announcer for nearly 40 years. Rich Cook serves as the composer of the show's theme music used since 1992, which includes three versions of varying length and an alternate version utilizing a saxophone.

The 1981–1992 TBN Praise the Lord theme song was composed and arranged by Rich Cook.

Steve Harris is played by a saxophone solo for the 1992 Praise the Lord closing theme music which was composed and arranged by Rich Cook from Palm Springs, CA

== Opening and closing sequences ==
The 1992 Praise the Lord opening and closing sequences was designed by Paul Sidlo and animated by Mike LaFave at REZN8 Productions in Los Angeles, CA
