= Brandon Crouch =

American evangelist and broadcaster (born 1983)

- Born: March 7, 1983 (age 43); Fountain Valley, California, U.S.
- Occupations: Evangelist, TV Host, Inspirational Youth Speaker.
- Employer(s): Brandon Crouch Ministries and The Word Network
- Known for: Co-founder of JUCE TV, a TBN Affiliate Youth Network
- Height: 6 ft 3 in (191 cm)
- Spouse: Marley Crouch
- Parent(s): Paul Crouch Jr. Tawny Crouch
- Relatives: Brittany Koper (sister); Carra Crouch (sister); Paul Crouch (grandfather); Jan Crouch (grandmother); Matt Crouch (uncle); Ron Dryden (grandfather); Linda Dryden (grandmother)
- Website: www.brandoncrouch.com

Brandon Paul Crouch /kraʊtʃ/ (born March 7, 1983) is a third-generation American Christian evangelist, youth speaker and television broadcaster. He is a member of the Crouch family, of which his grandfather Paul and grandmother Jan were founders of Trinity Broadcasting Network (TBN).

== Early years ==
He was born in Fountain Valley, California, the oldest child of Paul Crouch Jr., and Tawny Dryden. He is the grandson of Paul and Jan Crouch and Ron and Linda Dryden. His younger siblings are Brittany Koper and Carra Crouch.

Crouch followed the career path of his father, Paul Crouch Jr., and his grandfather’s, Paul Crouch and Ron Dryden, who all have a long history of pioneering and founding Christian ministries, and radio and television networks. The Crouch family founded the Trinity Broadcasting Network, while Ron and Linda Dryden were pastors of, Cathedral of Praise, now known as "The Cathedral," one of the largest Christian churches in Oklahoma City, Oklahoma. Dryden also owned one of the first contemporary Christian radio stations in the Oklahoma City market.

He grew up working alongside his father, Paul Crouch Jr., as Assistant Grip and Best Boy, and eventually as a Set and Commercial Production Assistant, at "PJ Video," a full service video production company which was owned by Paul Crouch Jr. Brandon Crouch worked at PJ Video throughout his middle and high school years. Crouch enjoyed competitive hockey, soccer, and baseball during high school and college, and competed in National tournaments such as N.A.R.C.H, and The California State Championships. Crouch continues academic studies in Theology through Liberty University.

== JCTV and TBN years ==
In 2001, Crouch officially joined the staff at Trinity Broadcasting Network. Crouch worked with the TBN Information Technology Group, in addition to operating camera operations for various TBN shows, including the network’s flagship show Praise the Lord and Behind the Scenes. During this time period, Crouch was also responsible for creating, and directing special TV projects and managing production crews for independent ministries such as Benny Hinn. Crouch also worked as TV Director for Pastor Steve Munsey with the Family Christian Center. In this role, Crouch began speaking publicly, and was the keynote speaker at many colleges.

In 2003, Crouch's father and grandfather, founded JCTV, TBN’s youth network (now known as JUCE TV) with Brandon managing facets of the network's development.

== Brandon Crouch Ministries ==
In recent years, Crouch has expanded his role as a Christian TV broadcaster. In 2009, Crouch founded Brandon Crouch Ministries, and spends much of his time sharing an evangelistic, faith-based message with young people. His teachings focus on relevant faith in God intersecting with the challenges faced by today’s youth. Crouch’s mission statement is to, "continue to follow my families legacy of preaching the gospel to the ends of the world and back."

Crouch is a prolific speaker, reaching his audience through local churches, youth conferences, prison ministry, and other public forums, in addition to his continued televised messages on JUCE TV, the internet and social media sites such as Facebook, Twitter, and live video streaming to mobile platforms and Video on Demand (VOD).
