= Huckabee =

- Presented by: Mike Huckabee
- Country of origin: United States
- No. of episodes: 191 (FNC run); 380 (TBN run); 571 (In total)

Production
- Executive producers: Matt Crouch; Mike Huckabee
- Production locations: New York City (2008–2015); Hendersonville, Tennessee (Trinity Music City) (2017–2025)
- Running time: 60 minutes

Original release
- Network: Fox News Channel
- Release: September 27, 2008 – January 3, 2015
- Network: Trinity Broadcasting Network
- Release: October 7, 2017 – January 11, 2025

Huckabee is an American television talk show hosted by former governor of Arkansas Mike Huckabee. The program's format was modeled after late-night talk shows, featuring an opening monologue, interviews, and musical performances.

The series was originally broadcast by Fox News Channel from September 27, 2008, to January 3, 2015, when Huckabee ended the show to focus on his 2016 presidential campaign. On October 7, 2017, Huckabee was revived by TBN, with the program moving to the auditorium of TBN's Trinity Music City complex in Hendersonville, Tennessee.

The TBN run of Huckabee concluded on January 11, 2025, after Huckabee was nominated by president-elect Donald Trump to serve as ambassador to Israel.

== History ==
The first incarnation of the series aired on Fox News Channel; each episode opened with an opening monologue discussing issues of the day, after which Huckabee opened the floor to field several questions from the audience. The show also featured one or more guests as well as a panel of commentators. Huckabee maintained a genial style as host and speaker, "markedly less combative" than other Fox News hosts. Tonal differences aside, he believed the show's conservative political content was harmonious with Fox News personalities past and present such as Glenn Beck, Sean Hannity and Bill O'Reilly, saying that he was "certainly on the same ideological spectrum" as them.

The show featured a house band known as The Little Rockers (a pun on Little Rock, Arkansas, where Huckabee once served) which featured several Fox News staff members, including Huckabee on bass guitar, and chief religious correspondent Lauren Green on keyboard.

=== TBN ===
After concluding in 2015, in May 2017 it was announced that Huckabee would be revived by TBN. The show was recorded before a studio audience at the Trinity Music City auditorium in Hendersonville, Tennessee (which was christened as the "Huckabee Theatre"), a few days before it aired. The show featured a new house band, The Music City Connection.

In November 2024, president-elect Donald Trump named Huckabee his presumptive nominee to be United States ambassador to Israel. In January 2025, Huckabee and TBN announced that Huckabee would conclude with a 90-minute series finale on January 11, 2025, with the Gaither Gospel Hour with Bill and Gloria Gaither moving into its Saturday-night timeslot.

Impressionist Rich Little was a frequent guest on Huckabee, having appeared more often than any other guest. His last appearance was on the series finale, January 11, 2025.
