= Maximum Bob =

Maximum Bob may refer to:

- Maximum Bob (TV series)
- Maximum Bob (novel)
- Maximum Bob (singer)

== See also ==
- Bobby Maximus, professional name of Rob MacDonald, Canadian mixed martial artist
