= Arthur Blessitt =

American Christian preacher (1940–2025)

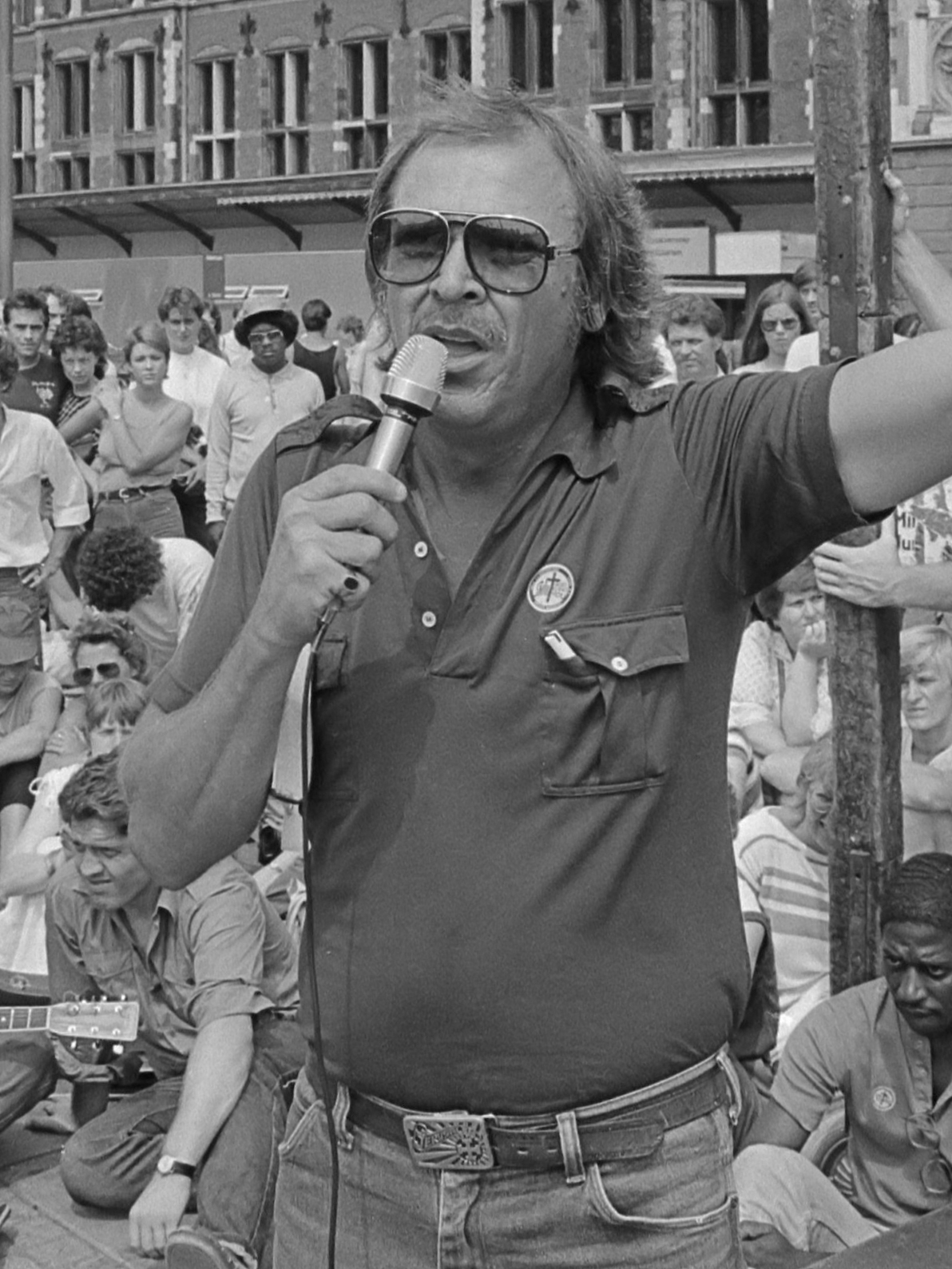
- Blessitt in 1983
- Born: Arthur Owen Blessitt; October 27, 1940; Greenville, Mississippi, US
- Died: January 14, 2025 (aged 84)
- Occupations: Minister, author, evangelist
- Known for: Cross walking
- Spouses: Sherry Simmons (m. 1963; div. 1990) Denise Irja Brown (m. 1990)
- Children: 7
- Parent(s): Arthur Blessitt, Sr. Mary Virginia Campbell
- Religion: Evangelical Christian
- Website: www.blessitt.com

Arthur Owen Blessitt (October 27, 1940 – January 14, 2025) was an American traveling Christian preacher who was known for carrying a cross through every nation of the world.

== Background ==
Blessitt was born in Greenville, Mississippi, on October 27, 1940, and grew up in Louisiana, where his father managed a large cotton farm. At the age of seven, Blessitt became a Christian. He studied at Mississippi College and Golden Gate Baptist Seminary, but abandoned his studies to serve as a pastor in several Baptist churches across the US.

In the late 1960s, Blessitt began preaching in Hollywood, California. There he became known as the "Minister of Sunset Strip". In March 1968, he opened a coffee house called His Place in a rented building next door to a topless go-go club.

== Cross walk ==
Arthur Blessitt was perhaps best known for his "cross walks" - travelling on foot, he dragged a wooden cross that he had originally built in 1968 to hang on the wall of "His Place" on Sunset Strip, Hollywood. He first made short cross walks in that area, apparently motivated by a very literal reading of the words of Jesus in Luke 9:23 “If anyone would come after me, let him deny himself and take up his cross daily and follow me."

The journeys soon became longer. On Christmas Day 1969, he began his first long journey with the cross, walking from Los Angeles to Washington, D.C. Speaking of his inspiration for the walks, he said he "heard the voice of Jesus calling him to walk to every nation." For a short while, from 1970 to 1971, he set up an evangelical outreach at New York's Times Square, which was similar to his Hollywood coffeehouse. In May 1971, Blessitt made his first overseas cross-walk, beginning in Northern Ireland.

Blessitt carried the cross to all parts of the world. During the Cold War, he carried his cross into Poland, Hungary, Yugoslavia, Bulgaria and other countries. He visited the Soviet Union with his cross for the only time in 1988, visiting Moscow for five days. In 1992, after the collapse of the Soviet Union, he visited the other post-Soviet republics, including the Baltic States and Ukraine. He carried the cross through such places as Iraq, North Korea, Iran, Afghanistan, Somalia, Sudan, China, South Africa, Lebanon, India, Antarctica, Palestine, Israel, Cuba, Libya, Northern and Southern Yemen, Vietnam and Mongolia.

While traveling, Blessitt met numerous world and religious leaders, including George W. Bush, Billy Graham, Pope John Paul II, Yasser Arafat and Muammar al-Gaddafi. He was arrested 24 times and lost his cross twice.

On part of a cross walk through Beirut, Blessitt chose to bring his son Arthur Joshua.

On June 13, 2008, Arthur Blessitt walked his 38,102nd mile (61,319th km) in Zanzibar, completing the goal he had set for himself to walk to every "country and island group" in the world.

As of July 2019, Blessitt still partook in cross walks globally. Blessitt claimed to have covered over 43,000 miles (69,202 km) through 324 "nations, island groups and territories". He also claimed to have traveled every ocean and walked on all seven continents (including Antarctica). Trinity Broadcast Network's PR Newswire claims that he is known internationally as the "Pilgrim with the Cross". He is featured in the Guinness World Records 2015 for holding the record for Longest Around the World Ongoing Pilgrimage/Walk.

Blessitt has been the subject of various documentaries, such as The Cross Museum of Arthur and Denise Blessitt (2014), Arthur: A Pilgrim (1988), and The Cross: The Arthur Blessitt Story (2009), directed by Matthew Crouch.

== Religious views ==
Blessitt practiced within the evangelical tradition of Protestant Christianity and sat within the Charismatic wing of that tradition. He listed R. T. Kendall and Charles Spurgeon as inspirations.

== Presidential campaign ==
Blessitt made a failed bid for the 1976 Democratic nomination for President. He withdrew from the contest after contesting the New Hampshire and Florida primaries. He polled fifth in Florida with 8,171 votes. He stated that he was "a happy loser" because "spiritual and moral reform has become a major campaign issue anyhow."

== Personal life and death ==
His first marriage was to Sherry Anne Simmons, whom he married within three weeks of dating in 1963. Together they had six children: Gina, Arthur Joel, Joy, Arthur Joshua, Arthur Joseph and Arthur Jerusalem. Blessitt and Simmons divorced in 1990.

He married Denise Irja Brown later in 1990. Together, they adopted a child, Sophia, and lived in Denver, Colorado.

Blessitt died on January 14, 2025, at the age of 84.
