= Preacher's Kid (film) =

- Directed by: Stan Foster
- Written by: Stan Foster
- Produced by: Marc Bienstock; Richard J. Cook; Matthew Crouch; Stan Foster; Darryl Taja
- Starring: LeToya Luckett; Rae'Ven Larrymore Kelly; Kiki Sheard; Durrell "Tank" Babbs; Clifton Powell; Gregory Alan Williams; Sharif Atkins; Trey Songz; Tammy Townsend; Essence Atkins; Ella Joyce
- Cinematography: Dave Perkal
- Edited by: Richard Nord
- Production company: Gener8Xion Entertainment
- Distributed by: Warner Premiere
- Release date: January 29, 2010
- Running time: 110 minutes
- Country: United States
- Language: English
- Budget: $3 million
- Box office: $515,065

Preacher's Kid is a 2010 American Christian drama film directed by Stan Foster, loosely based on the Parable of the Prodigal Son. Original songs and score are composed by recording artist and music producer Tim Miner. The film was written and directed by Stan Foster, and stars LeToya Luckett, Durrell "Tank" Babbs, Clifton Powell, Gregory Alan Williams, Rae'Ven Larrymore Kelly, Kiki Sheard, Sharif Atkins, Tammy Townsend, and Essence Atkins.

The film was given a limited theatrical release by Warner Premiere on January 29, 2010.

== Plot ==
Small-town preacher's kid Angie King leaves the church and her Augusta, GA home to pursue a dream of singing stardom. Luckett plays Angie, the daughter of a stern but loving bishop, whose attraction to the hunky star (Tank) of a traveling gospel show takes her on the road...and into romance, heartbreak and the realization that happiness may lie in the home she left behind.

== Cast ==
- LeToya Luckett as Angie
- Durrell "Tank" Babbs as Devlin Mitchell
- Tammy Townsend as Desiree
- Carlos Davis as Biscuit
- Trey Songz as Monty
- Clifton Powell as Ike
- Ella Joyce as Sister Watkins
- Rae'Ven Larrymore Kelly as Marcia
- Dawnn Lewis as Mya
- Sharif Atkins as Wynton
- Kierra Sheard as Litha
- Gregory Alan Williams as Bishop King
- Essence Atkins as Peaches

== Release ==
Preacher's Kid was released to 109 theaters on January 29, 2010. Gen8X committed to donate the film's opening day net proceeds to humanitarian aid for 2010 Haiti earthquake relief through charities such as Smile of a Child, Friend Ships, and Samaritan's Purse. In its opening weekend, it grossed $190,638, which equals $1,749 per theater. The film has accumulated $515,065 to date.

== Reception ==
On Rotten Tomatoes the film has a score of 67% based on reviews from 6 critics. Michael Dequina of The Movie Report said, "Foster's film confirms the unique, undeniable power this genre can achieve on both stage and film..." John Anderson of Variety gave the film a mixed review, saying, "Stan Foster, making his directorial debut, has reared a 'Preacher's Kid' that's largely wooden, unlikely in many spots and, despite the few hard-edges of his script, could have used a tougher sensibility. The results are a movie that doesn't quite know what it wants to be. But, overall it was a good movie."

== See also ==
- List of black films of the 2010s
