= Matt Crouch =

Matt Crouch may refer to:

- Matt Crouch (broadcaster), American Christian broadcaster
- Matt Crouch (footballer), Australian rules footballer
