= Pronto (novel) =

1993 novel by Elmore Leonard

- First edition
- Author: Elmore Leonard
- Language: English
- Genre: Crime/Contemporary
- Publisher: Delacorte Press
- Publication date: 1993
- Publication place: United States
- Media type: Hard cover
- Pages: 265
- ISBN: 0-385-33290-4
- Followed by: Riding the Rap

Pronto is a crime novel written by Elmore Leonard and published in 1993. Leonard introduces three main characters and gets them moving against each other. Harry is constantly reminiscing about World War II. Tommy carries a picture of the old crime boss Frank Costello in his wallet. Raylan is a U.S. Marshal who wears a cowboy hat. In addition, the inclusion of the Ezra Pound stories add more to the understanding of Harry and his reasons for retiring to Rapallo, Italy.

A 1997 made-for-TV film version of Pronto starred Peter Falk, Glenne Headly and James LeGros.

== Plot summary ==
Harry Arno, an over-the-hill Miami bookmaker, quietly lives the good life with his girlfriend, Joyce Patton. He has skimmed for years from his corpulent mob boss, Jimmy "Cap" Capotorto, and managed to salt away nearly a million dollars in a Swiss bank account. Harry wants to retire and move to Rapallo, Italy, dreaming of an idyllic existence with Joyce in a villa by the sea. As a soldier in Rapallo, he once briefly talked to Ezra Pound when the poet was incarcerated.

The Justice Department sets up Harry by putting out the word about his skimming activities, assuming that Harry will be forced to ask for witness protection and turn state's evidence against Jimmy Cap. Jimmy dispatches a low-life hit man named Earl Crowe, but Harry proves to be faster with a gun. Harry skips his bond and eludes U.S. Marshal and former Marine Raylan Givens. Harry makes a nostalgic dash for Rapallo.

Holed up in a picturesque Italian resort, Harry is soon pursued by Joyce and Raylan. Tommy "the Zip" Bitonti, another mob affiliate, wants to take over Harry's action, so he tells Jimmy that he'll take out Harry in Italy. If Harry ends up dead, the Zip gets to take over the bookie operation, which is going to mean a lot more money. The Zip, who in Miami endlessly humiliates "Stronzo" Nicky Testa, demonstrates his penchant for violence with a cold-blooded murder.

Harry now has so many people following him that the small village of Rapallo becomes inundated with mobsters and federal agents. To his aid comes Robert Gee, a former French foreign legionnaire, who helps him defend the villa against the trigger-happy mobsters. During these events, the 66-year-old Harry starts drinking again, which causes the situation to deteriorate even faster. Harry is in real danger of losing his life but Raylan makes sure that doesn't happen.

== Connections ==
It was followed by the 1995 novel Riding the Rap. A 1997 made-for-TV film version of Pronto starred Peter Falk, Glenne Headly and James LeGros as Arno, Patton and Givens, respectively. Jimmy Cap had previously appeared in Leonard's previous novel Cat Chaser, and a member of the Crowe family - who appear in Maximum Bob, Gold Coast, and Riding the Rap - appears here.

The character of Raylan Givens would later become the protagonist for the television series Justified.
