= Terry Zwigoff's unrealized projects =

During his long career, American film director Terry Zwigoff has worked on a number of projects which never progressed beyond the pre-production stage under his direction. Some of these productions fell in development hell or were cancelled.

== 1980s ==
=== Sassy ===
According to Vice, Zwigoff and Robert Crumb were once hired by the Mitchell brothers to write a pornographic film based on one of Crumb's comics about a female sasquatch who is dragged from the wild into the culturally bankrupt world of modern America. Their unproduced and ultimately non-pornographic screenplay, titled Sassy, was written in 1988.

== 1990s ==
=== Stuart ===
In 1997, it was reported in Variety that Zwigoff was attached to direct Stuart, a film co-written by Dave Sheridan with Larry Doyle, based on a hapless character Sheridan created in a short film years prior. The plot follows a Texan who lives in a trailer and becomes obsessed with a female acquaintance of his after she casually mentions something about love.

== 2000s ==
=== Elf ===
Zwigoff turned down the offer to direct Elf (2003) in favor of directing Bad Santa (2003).

=== Happy Days ===
In July 2006, it was reported that Zwigoff was to write and direct a film adaptation of the French novel Happy Days by Laurent Graff. Jerry Stahl was to have co-written the script with Zwigoff and the film was to have been produced by Johnny Depp via Infinitum Nihil and Graham King via Initial Entertainment Group.

=== The $40,000 Man ===
In September 2007, it was reported that Zwigoff was to direct and co-write with Daniel Clowes a film titled The $40,000 Man for New Line Cinema.

=== King's Court TV series ===
In 2008, Zwigoff attempted to make a proposed series called King's Court for HBO, which would have starred Tony Cox in the lead as a donut shop owner with big dreams. "The idea was a largely black cast in an area of L.A. that was in an apartment complex," Zwigoff said. "It wasn't about race, but it was about class. I thought it was really funny and [Cox] loved it. [...] I sent it to HBO and they said 'I don't know, we already have a Black show'."

== 2010s ==
=== Maximum Bob ===
In a 2012 interview with IndieWire, Zwigoff claimed he attempted to write and direct a film adaptation of the Elmore Leonard novel Maximum Bob.

=== Justice for Al ===
In June 2013, it was reported that Zwigoff was to direct Fred Armisen in a film he co-wrote with Melissa Axelrod titled Justice for Al.

=== Lost Melody ===
In July 2013, it was reported that Zwigoff was to direct a film he co-wrote with Melissa Axelrod titled Lost Melody with Edward R. Pressman producing and Nicolas Cage slated to star.

=== Edward Ford ===
Zwigoff confirmed in a 2017 interview with Vanity Fair that he attempted to make Lem Dobbs’ unproduced script titled Edward Ford into a film with Michael Shannon slated to star. According to Zwigoff, the film was never made because "the money fell through."

== 2020s ==
=== Untitled TV series ===
In the 2020s, Zwigoff was reportedly developing a series with writers Glenn Ficarra and John Requa. He expressed interest in casting Tony Cox for a role if greenlit for production.
