= David Wall (actor) =

American actor

- Occupations: Film, television Actor, Film Director
- Spouse: Kerry Brennan

David Wall is an American actor who wrote, produced, and directed the 2007 dramedy film Noëlle. His wife, Kerry Wall, and three of their children also had roles in the film. Noëlle won the Best Director Award at the Fort Lauderdale International Film Festival.

Wall wrote, co-produced and directed Joe & Joe, shot by Kramer Morgenthau on Cape Cod in Massachusetts, which was selected for the 1996 Sundance Film Festival. He played the lead role of David in Shades of Truth (2015), a film directed by Liana Marabini and produced by Condor Pictures.
