= Brittany Koper =

American human resources professional (born 1985)

Brittany Crouch
- Born: Brittany Brianne Crouch; May 1, 1985 (age 41); Anaheim, California, U.S.
- Other name: Brittany Koper
- Occupation: Human Resources Professional
- Spouse: Michael Koper
- Parent(s): Paul Crouch Jr. Tawny Crouch
- Relatives: Paul Crouch, Sr. (grandfather); Jan Crouch (grandmother); Matthew Crouch (uncle); Brandon Crouch (brother); Carra Crouch (sister)

Brittany Crouch Koper (born May 1, 1985) is an American human resources professional. She gained notoriety after she was dismissed from, and filed a lawsuit against attorneys for, the Trinity Broadcasting Network (TBN). She is the granddaughter of Paul and Jan Crouch, co-founders and directors of the TBN, and daughter of Paul Crouch Jr., formerly of TBN and now with the Word Network.

== Early life ==
She was born in Anaheim, California, the daughter of Paul Crouch Jr. and Tawny Dryden. She was raised in Irvine, where she attended Woodbridge High School. She was largely raised separate from TBN, but occasionally took part in TBN special events.

In 2002, during a Tulsa Miracle Crusade with popular televangelist Benny Hinn, she and her brother Brandon were laid hands on numerous times. Benny then stated that she had a mighty anointing on her.

Koper attended St. John's University in New York City. In 2007, she moved back to California, where she completed an MBA from Concordia University.

== Trinity Broadcasting Network ==
Koper worked at TBN from 2007 to 2011, initially serving in the personnel department. She was named chief financial officer of TBN on July 5, 2011. On August 30, 2011, Koper and her husband (a lawyer, also employed by TBN) claim they wrote a confidential memorandum to Paul Crouch Sr., alleging that "we think current TBN practices and procedures violate the IRS Code and State and Federal Laws... we do not feel comfortable being Secretary/Treasurer without bringing these issues forward." Her concerns included that expensive houses, vehicles and other assets were used exclusively by Crouch family members but accounted for as ministry expenses. She has been highly critical of the alleged extravagances of her uncle Matthew Crouch, Vice President and the many millions of dollars transferred into the film company he runs.

One month after the memo, on September 30, 2011, Koper's employment with TBN was terminated. The employment of her husband, brother, sister, and father by TBN was also terminated later that year.

On February 1, 2012, Koper filed a lawsuit against Davert & Loe, a law firm that had previously represented both Koper and TBN. In this lawsuit, Koper alleged that TBN unlawfully distributed over $50 million to the organization's directors. Koper also accused Davert & Loe of professional negligence and fiduciary duty for allegedly secretly filing a lawsuit against her while continuing to serve as her legal counsel.

On May 10, 2012, Koper filed a declaration in support of a lawsuit filed against TBN by her husband's uncle, Joseph McVeigh. In this declaration, Koper alleged that TBN improperly disbursed large sums of money to its directors.

TBN denied these allegations, and alleged that Koper had fabricated or altered several of the documents that she relied on in her declaration. They also stated that the Kopers moved money into accounts illegally in order to purchase a house and benefit Mr. Koper's uncle. The Kopers said that those were proper loans and had been repaid. TBN said that the lawsuit by Koper was simply a way to divert attention from their own misdeeds.

In interviews, Koper described the actions of her grandparents as "illegal and unconscionable." However, she said she missed her grandmother (her grandfather, Paul Sr., died in 2013) and had made several attempts at contact, none of which were answered. Jan Crouch died on May 31, 2016, from complications of a stroke.
