= Gener8Xion Entertainment =

Christian film production company

Gener8Xion Entertainment, Inc.
- Type: Inc
- Industry: Film
- Founded: 1993
- Founders: Matthew Crouch
- Headquarters: Hollywood, California, United States
- Key people: Richard J. Cook (CEO and Chairman); Sonny Lofbom (President); Stephan Blinn (Chief Creative Officer); Ted Fay (CTO)
- Products: Motion pictures, television programs
- Website: www.8X.com

Gener8Xion Entertainment, Inc. was an independent film production company based in Hollywood, California. The company was led by Matt Crouch until mid-2010, with Richard J Cook appointed as the new CEO.

Notable in the company's filmography is the 2006 epic "One Night with the King. Variety praised it as "Blessed with abundant production values and a minimum of campy excess, 'One Night with the King' is a surprisingly satisfying attempt to revive the Old Hollywood tradition of lavishly appointed Biblical epics aimed at mainstream auds [sic]." Roger Moore of the Tribune New Service also praised the film, comparing the visuals as aspiring to the heights of Lord of the Rings on a fraction of the budget: "Filmed at an Indian castle, with digital vistas added to re-create the ancient capital Persepolis, this movie reaches for the scale of “Lord of the Rings” or “The Chronicles of Narnia” at a fraction of the cost. It doesn’t quite get there. But the filmmakers have done justice to a tale that is tribal history, not a supernatural myth. Esther’s triumph isn’t due to divine intervention. It’s her humanity and bravery that make her a legend, and make that “One Night” worth remembering, 2,500 years later."

On October 03, 2005, Gener8Xion Entertainment, Inc. (GNXE), announced it had executed the acquisition of Cinemills, a Burbank, CA-based company specializing in manufacturing of high quality motion picture and studio lighting equipment and accessories. Gener8Xion stated this acquisition would enable it to "enhance its own productions and facility lighting needs as well as the needs of its client base across the globe." Following closing of the transaction, Cinemills, and its respective brand and name became a division of Gener8Xion, serving as "the Company's media lighting equipment manufacturer and sales and marketing office for such related lighting products."

== Filmography ==
- The Omega Code (1999)
- Carman: The Champion (2001)
- Megiddo: The Omega Code 2 (2001)
- One Night with the King (2006)
- Noëlle (2007) (distributor)
- The Cross (2009)
- Preacher's Kid (2010)
