= Paul Crouch Jr. =

American Christian broadcaster (born 1959)

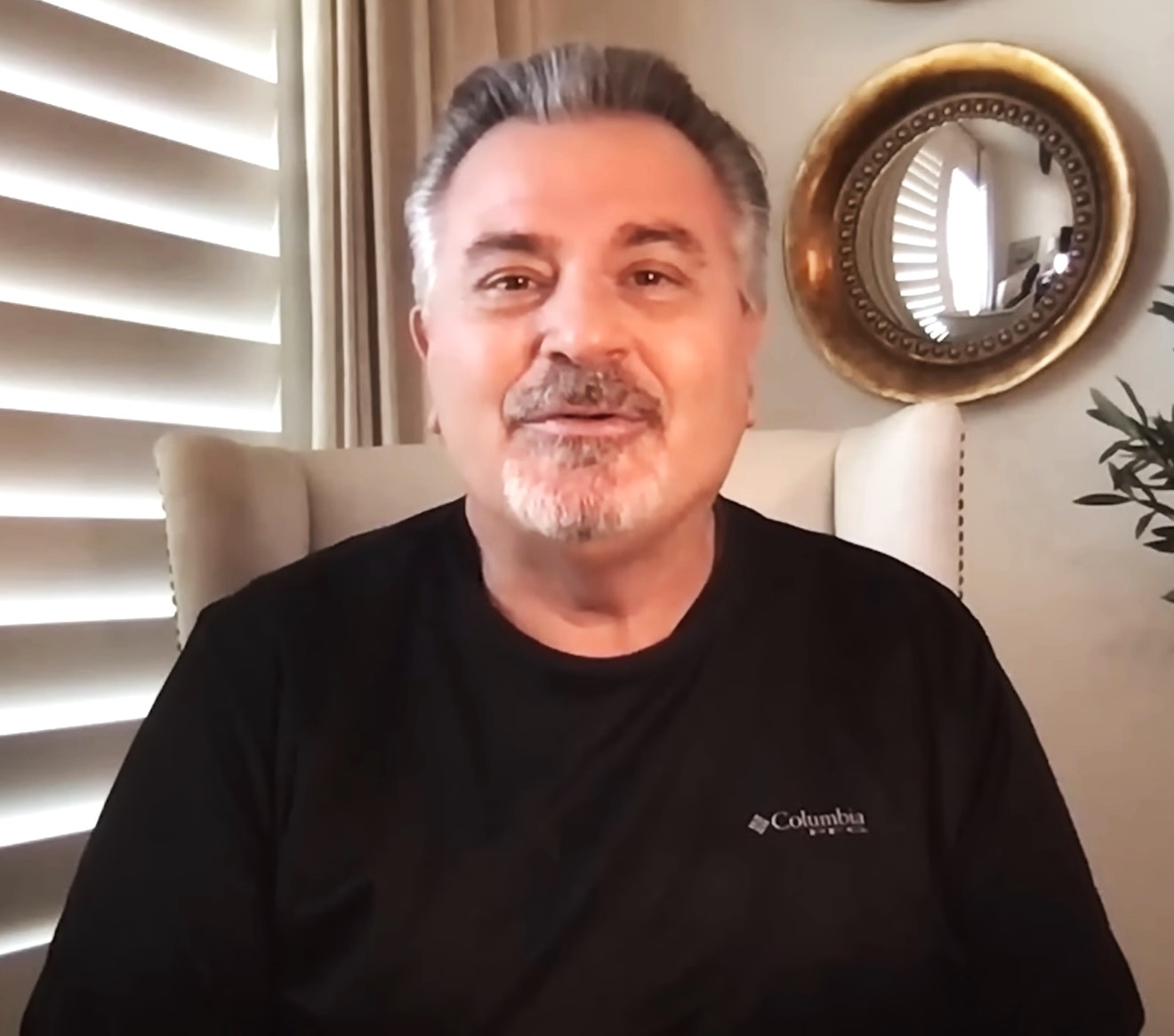
- Crouch in 2022
- Born: Paul Franklin Crouch Jr. March 13, 1959 (age 67); Rapid City, South Dakota
- Occupation: TV Network Executive
- Title: Chairman and chief studio designer for Cinemills Corporation
- Spouses: Tawny Dryden (m. 1980; div. 2007) Brenda Crouch (m. 2014)
- Children: Brandon Crouch; Brittany Crouch Koper; Carra Crouch
- Parents: Paul Crouch (father); Jan Crouch (mother)
- Relatives: Matt Crouch (brother); Laurie Orndorff Crouch (sister-in-law)

Paul Franklin Crouch Jr. /kraʊtʃ/ (born March 13, 1959) is an American Christian broadcaster. He is chairman and chief studio designer for Cinemills Corporation. He is best known, however, for his long association with the Trinity Broadcasting Network (TBN), which was founded by his parents Paul and Jan Crouch.

== Personal life ==
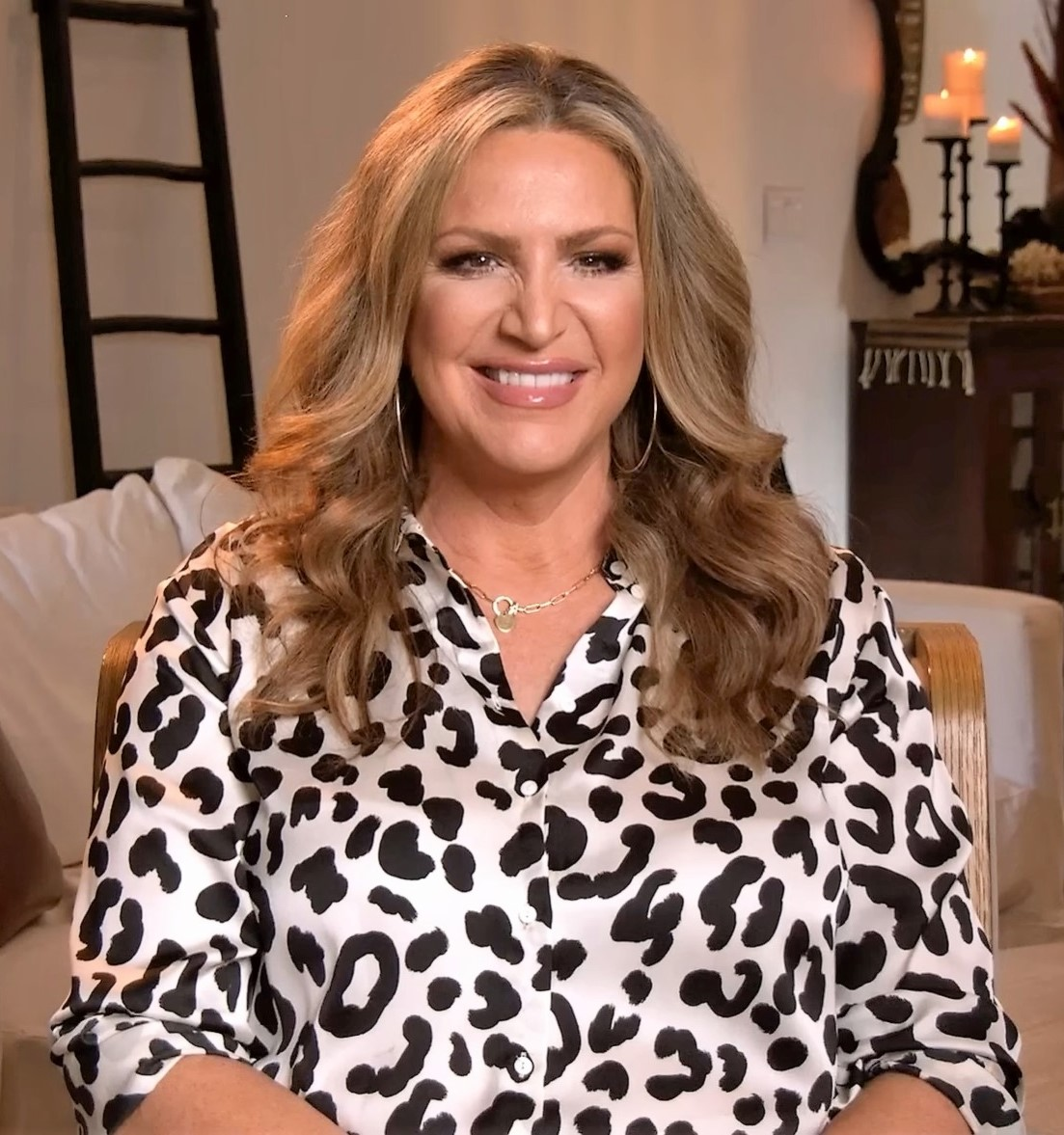
Wife Brenda Crouch on her ministry channel in 2022

The oldest of Paul and Jan Crouch's two children, Crouch Jr. was born in Rapid City, South Dakota, where his father was working in commercial broadcasting at the time. The Crouches eventually moved to California, where they co-founded Trinity Broadcasting Network in 1973.

Crouch married Tawny Dryden, the daughter of Oklahoma City pastors Ron and Linda Dryden, in 1980. The couple had three children together—son Brandon and daughters Brittany and Carra—before divorcing around 2007. He married Brenda Crouch in 2014.

== Professional career ==
As a teenager, Crouch worked behind the scenes during the formative years of TBN, alongside his parents and younger brother Matthew. In the early 1980s, however, he left TBN and ventured out on his own to produce and direct various Christian television programs such as Church in the Home for Fred Jordan and a program for TBN regular Dwight Thompson. Around this time, in 1982 Crouch briefly entered the spotlight as an outspoken critic of backmasking.

He made appearances on both religious networks (including TBN) and secular programs, such as The Merv Griffin Show, playing rock music recordings he believed contained Satanic messages when played backwards.

In 1983 Crouch formed PJ Video, a full service video production company which offered post-production services for both Christian ministries and secular clients. Two years later he co-founded The Edit Bay, a post-production editing facility.

In 1990 Crouch joined Jay Sekulow in establishing Sonlight Broadcasting Systems, a network of Christian television stations based in the southern United States. All of Sonlight's stations were affiliated with the Trinity Broadcasting Network. Crouch served as a member of the board of Sonlight Broadcasting until 1995, and developed and produced television programs that were broadcast on the stations.

== TBN ==
Crouch returned to Trinity Broadcasting on a full-time basis in 1998 in the role of vice president of production, where he oversaw the development of new programs and special projects. He also worked alongside his brother Matthew, as second unit director of photography on the TBN-produced full-length motion picture, The Omega Code (1999).

In 2003 Crouch and his son Brandon spearheaded the launch of JCTV, TBN's youth network. Crouch was later elevated to the position of chief of staff, taking a more prominent role in the management and expansion of TBN's global network. Crouch led TBN's expansion into digital platforms, including the internet and social media sites such as Facebook. He also began to increase his on-camera presence on the network as a frequent host of Praise the Lord and Behind the Scenes, TBN's flagship programs.

== Recent career ==
Crouch was forced from his role at TBN, and quit being on the board in October 2011. His departure came on the heels of a lawsuit brought against his parents by his daughter, Brittany Crouch Koper. Crouch and his daughter Brittany left TBN in an act of solidarity to protest the controversial actions taken by the network’s management.

He later joined the Word Network as director of project development. The Word Network is a Christian network, headquartered in Southfield, Michigan. Crouch established facilities for the Word Network in the Los Angeles area. Crouch was fired by the Word Network in 2016 due to a conflict of interests when he produced a spot for another Christian network on his own time using equipment he owned through his video production company, PJ Video, a full service video production company. Crouch has owned and operated PJ Video since 1983.

In his current position, Crouch serves as chairman and chief studio designer for Cinemills Corporation. Cinemills provides studio facilities and designs, manufactures and supplies lighting equipment for motion pictures, television and still photography. Crouch also provides management, technical and creative consulting services for Tri-State Christian Television, doing business as TCT Network, and Truli Media Corporation, parent company of Truli.com, a digital OTT platform focused on family friendly content.

In February 2017, Crouch, the management of Cinemills Corporation and Michael Jay Solomon, chairman and CEO of Truli Media Corporation, formed Truli Cinemills Media Corporation (TCMC). TCMC will produce and distribute family-friendly films, documentaries and TV series in English and Spanish. The first project announced as part of TCMC is A Cowgirl's Story, a full-length feature film inspired by the classic novel Little Women by Louisa May Alcott. A Cowgirl's Story is set to be distributed by Samuel Goldwyn Films.
