= Smile (TV network) =

Former American Christian television network (2005–2025)

Smile TV
- Final logo used from January 1, 2017 to January 12, 2025
- Country: United States
- Broadcast area: Nationwide
- Headquarters: Garland, Texas

Programming
- Language: English
- Picture format: 480i SDTV

Ownership
- Owner: Trinity Broadcasting Network

History
- Launched: December 24, 2005; 20 years ago
- Closed: January 12, 2025; 21 months ago
- Replaced by: Yippee TV (online); OnTV4U (TBN commercial broadcast stations)
- Former names: Smile of a Child (2005–2016)

Links
- Website: smileofachildtv.org (archived January 2017)

Smile (shortened from its former name of Smile of a Child) was an American Christian free-to-air television network owned and operated by the Trinity Broadcasting Network. The network was aimed at children aged 2–12 and offered a mixture of children's religious and family-oriented programming. The network was founded as the television branch of TBN's Smile of a Child ministry, created by TBN co-founder Jan Crouch.

Smile was also available on pay-TV providers, which usually carried it in a company with TBN's other networks, in addition to worldwide satellite and streaming availability. In addition, the parent network TBN carried a "Smile" block on Saturday mornings.

The channel closed on January 12, 2025, with all of its programming being moved to the TBN-operated streaming platform Yippee TV.

== History ==
=== Early history as Smile of a Child ===
Smile of a Child logo used from December 24, 2005, to December 31, 2016; the "butterfly" element in the logo is a monogram of Jan Crouch's initials with her maiden name of Janice Wendell Bethany.

Founded as Smile of a Child TV by TBN co-founder Jan Crouch, the network was developed and named after Smile of a Child, a children's outreach ministry founded by Jan and Paul Crouch in the 1990s to provide services and donations to needy children worldwide. The network launched on December 24, 2005 at 3:00 a.m. Eastern Time, with the holiday-themed special Martin the Cobbler as its inaugural program.

Smile of a Child was initially available as a 24/7 service on all platforms, and introduced on digital subchannels of TBN owned-and-operated station in 13 markets. Over the subsequent years, Smile expanded its national coverage to all of TBN's owned-and-operated and affiliated stations in nearly 40 markets, carried usually on the fifth subchannel (for example, if the local TBN station broadcasts on channel 17, then Smile would be carried on digital subchannel 17.5).

=== Multicasting consolidation with JUCE TV ===
On June 1, 2015, Smile of a Child was combined into a single subchannel with a sister network JUCE TV (which targeted teenagers and young adults 13 to 30 years of age), under a timeshare arrangement. As a result of the realignment, for over-the-air viewers, Smile was originally reduced to a 9-hour daily programming schedule (from 6 a.m. to 3 p.m. Eastern Time) on the third subchannel occupied by JUCE (which continued to air over its existing subchannel slot for the remainder of the broadcast day) on the 38 stations owned directly by TBN and through its subsidiary Community Educational Television. The following week, the timeshare was modified so that Smile would air from 7 a.m. to 7 p.m. (Eastern), with JUCE airing the remainder of the day, giving each network a daily 12-hour window on its owned-and-operated stations' DT3 subchannels.

The change, which was required due to multiplexing limitations at the time with TBN's over-the-air stations, was required due to the launch of TBN Salsa, a digital subchannel network targeting English-speaking Latino viewers which launched on that date.

Although it had a reduced presence on broadcast television, Smile continued to maintain a 24-hour-day schedule via live stream on TBN's website, and mobile and digital media players as well as on select cable and satellite providers that carry the TBN multicast networks, as was the case before the over-the-air consolidation of the two networks. The network rebranded as simply "Smile" on January 1, 2017, with an updated network imaging, including its logo and continuity.

=== Resumption of 24-hour service ===
On January 1, 2020 (New Year's Day), TBN resumed offering a 24-hour feed of Smile on its multicast tier over the DT3 subchannel of its owned-and-operated stations. Concurrently, JUCE TV was moved to the DT5 feed previously occupied by TBN Salsa, which was discontinued from its broadcast stations in May 2019, when a standard definition feed of the main TBN signal began being offered as a placeholder feed.

In February 2021, Olympusat, the main provider of TBN's networks to cable providers in the United States (including Verizon FiOS and Xfinity), discontinued carriage of the network, thus affecting carriage of Smile to those systems.

=== Closure ===
Smile closed on January 12, 2025; promos announcing the channel's closure began airing in December 2024; TBN moved all of its programming to its Christian children's streaming service Yippee TV. Outside of TBN's non-commercial broadcast stations that carried Smile (which removed their channel space entirely), the channel space is currently leased by OnTV4U, an all-paid programming network.

== Awards and honors ==
2008: Parents Television Council Entertainment Seal of Approval

== See also ==
- JUCE TV
- Positiv
