= The Cross (2009 film) =

- Theatrical release poster
- Directed by: Matthew Crouch
- Produced by: Matthew Crouch; Laurie Crouch; Richard J. Cook; Stephan Blinn
- Starring: Arthur Blessitt
- Edited by: Stephan Blinn
- Music by: Matthew R. Long (original score)
- Production company: Gener8Xion Entertainment
- Distributed by: Gener8Xion Entertainment
- Release date: March 27, 2009
- Running time: 90 minutes
- Country: United States
- Language: English
- Box office: $741,557

The Cross (also known as The Cross: The Arthur Blessitt Story) is a 2009 documentary film directed by Matthew Crouch, in his directorial debut. The film chronicles Arthur Blessitt's Guinness World Record-setting journey of 38,102 miles of forty years "into every nation and major island group of the world" while carrying a twelve-foot wooden cross.

== Production ==
Twenty years earlier Crouch had made a documentary about Blessitt. Then, in the summer of 2008, Crouch and Blessitt "ran into each other" on the cusp of Blessitt's final trip to Zanzibar, an island off the coast of the continent of Africa, which gave them the idea to create a brand new documentary that would finish telling the story of Blessitt's journey.

=== Box office ===
The Cross opened on March 27, 2009 in 221 theaters, and grossed approximately $300,000. It made $741,557 total.

Most reviews of the film criticized it for not offering a balanced, unbiased insight into both Blessitt's journey or the effects of it on his life and family. As an example, Annie Young Frisbie, writing for Christianity Today, wrote:

Because Crouch avoids any deep questioning of Blessitt, and fails to bring in any other voices, The Cross lacks structure. While Blessitt is appealing, once the novelty of his walk wears off, there's nothing left for audiences to sink their teeth into.

== Soundtrack ==
The soundtrack features original songs by Javen and The Katinas that are inspired by the film as well as an original score from first-time composer Matthew R. Long.
