= Rae'Ven Larrymore Kelly =

American actress

Rae'Ven Larrymore Kelly is an American actress. She performed in several film and television projects such as A Time to Kill and What's Love Got to Do with It as young Tina Turner. Kelly has also appeared in guest-starring roles on shows like E.R. and Roseanne. In early 2010 Kelly played Marcia in the movie Preacher's Kid.

== Filmography ==
Film
Year	Title	Role	Notes
1993	What's Love Got to Do with It	Young Anna Mae Bullock	
1995	How to Make an American Quilt	Little Anna	
1996	A Time to Kill	Tonya Hailey	
1996	Ghosts of Mississippi	Reena Evers – Age 10	
1998	The Last Weekend	Raven	Short film
1998	Milo	Kendra	
1998	Blossoms and Veils		Short film
2000	Odessa	Angela	Short film
2001	Flossin	Ardelia	
2006	The Still Life	Art buyer	
2007	Tournament of Dreams	Slick	
2009	Genius in Heels	Zora	Short film
2010	Preacher's Kid	Marcia	
2011	Nocturnal Agony	Bay Bay	
2012	Locked in a Room	Attorney Goldstein	
2013	State of Mind	Gina	Short film
2016	The Rogue	Sgt. Hills' Wife	Pre-production, on hold
2017	Race to Judgment	Kat Wallace	Pre-production

Television
Year	Title	Role	Notes
1991–1993	I'll Fly Away	Adlaine Harper	19 episodes
1993	Class of '61	Statie	TV movie
1993	Living Single	Camille	Episode: "Living Single... with Children"
1993	I'll Fly Away: Then and Now	Adlaine Harper	TV movie
1994	On Our Own	Hannah	Episode: “Pilot”
1994	Monty	Tina	Episode: "The Principal's Interest"
1994	Roc	Robin	Episode: "You Shouldn't Have to Lie"
1994	Sweet Justice	Niara	Episode: "The Power of Darkness: Part 1"
1994	Roseanne	Geena Williams	Episode: "White Men Can't Kiss"
1994	Lily in Winter	Louetta Covington	TV movie
1994	Touched by an Angel	Serena	Episode: "Fear Not!"
1996	America's Dream	Lara	TV movie
1996	ER	Monique	Episode: "John Carter, M.D."
1996	The Sentinel	Pam Ferris	Episode: "Out of the Past"
1997	The Ditchdigger's Daughters	Young Jeanette	TV movie
1997	Happily Ever After: Fairy Tales for Every Child	Goldina (voice)	Episode: "King Midas"
1997	Ms. Scrooge	Young Ebenita	TV movie
1998	Maximum Bob	Wanda Grace	7 episodes
1999	Any Day Now		Episode: "A Parent's Job"
2000	Freedom Song	Dora Charles	TV movie
2000	City of Angels	Savannah	Episode: "When Worlds Colitis"
2000	Happily Ever After: Fairy Tales for Every Child	Imani (voice)	Episode: "The Steadfast Tin Soldier"
2000	Cover Me: Based on the True Life of an FBI Family	Estelle	Episode: "Killing Me Softly"
2001	Buffy the Vampire Slayer	Lisa	Episode: "The Body"
2002	Even Stevens	Denise	Episode: "Your Toast"
2004	"Good Girls Don't..."	Shaquandra	Episode: "I Never"
2006	Hannah Montana	Olivia	Episode: "I Can't Make You Love Hannah If You Don't"
2018–present	Fly	Capt. Skylar Wyatt	Also writer
