= Paul Crouch =

American television evangelist (1934–2013)

- Born: Paul Franklin Crouch; March 30, 1934; St Joseph, Missouri, U.S.
- Died: November 30, 2013 (aged 79); Orange, California, U.S.
- Resting place: Pacific View Memorial Park; Corona del Mar, Newport Beach, California
- Occupations: Evangelist; television network executive
- Years active: 1955–2003
- Employer: Trinity Broadcasting Network (TBN)
- Known for: Founder of TBN
- Title: President
- Spouse: Jan Crouch (m. 1957–2013)
- Children: Paul Crouch, Jr. Matthew Crouch
- Relatives: Five grandchildren including Brandon Crouch and Brittany Koper
- Website: paulcrouch.com

Paul Franklin Crouch (/kraʊtʃ/; (March 30, 1934 – November 30, 2013) was an American televangelist and the co-founder of the Trinity Broadcasting Network (TBN). Founded in 1973 with his wife, Jan Crouch, TBN grew to become the world's largest religious television network. Crouch was a prominent figure in the prosperity gospel movement, a theology that drew both a massive global following and significant criticism regarding the network's fundraising tactics and the family's lavish lifestyle.

== Life and career ==
=== Early life and education ===
Paul Franklin Crouch was born on March 30, 1934, in St. Joseph, Missouri. He was the son of Assemblies of God missionaries Andrew F. Crouch and Sara Swingle. His father died when Crouch was seven years old, and he was raised primarily by his mother and grandparents.

Crouch attended the Central Bible College (affiliated with the Assemblies of God) in Springfield, Missouri, graduating in 1955 with a degree in theology. In 1957, he married Janice Bethany (known as Jan Crouch), whom he met while she was attending Bible college in Missouri. They had two sons, Paul Crouch Jr. and Matthew Crouch.

=== Early broadcasting career ===
Crouch began his broadcasting career in the 1950s, working in radio and television production for the Assemblies of God denomination. In 1961, he was appointed by the denomination to organize its newly created Department of Television and Film Production in Burbank, California. During his tenure, he supervised the production of films and audiovisual materials for missionary work.

In the mid-1960s, Crouch moved into management, serving as the general manager for KREL radio in Corona, California. In 1970, he left KREL to manage KHOF-FM and KHOF-TV in San Bernardino, California.

=== Trinity Broadcasting Network ===
In 1973, Paul and Jan Crouch, along with Jim and Tammy Faye Bakker, founded the Trinity Broadcasting Network (TBN). The network began operations by renting airtime on KBSA-TV before purchasing KLXA-TV (Channel 40) in Santa Ana, California, in 1974. The Bakkers left the network shortly after its founding to start their own ministry, The PTL Club.

Under Crouch's leadership, TBN expanded from a single low-power station to the world's largest religious television network. Crouch utilized satellite technology to distribute TBN's programming globally, focusing on a model of viewer-supported funding often referred to as the prosperity gospel. The theology suggests that God rewards financial giving with material wealth and it became a central theme of the network's fundraising appeals ("Praise-a-Thons"). Crouch produced several Christian films via the network's production arm including The Omega Code (1999) and Megiddo: The Omega Code 2 (2001).

=== Later life and death ===
In his later years, Crouch and the network faced scrutiny regarding financial transparency and the family's use of tax-exempt ministry funds for personal amenities, including owning multiple homes and private jets.

Crouch suffered from chronic heart problems for a decade prior to his death. He died of heart failure at his home in Orange, California, on November 30, 2013, at the age of 79. He is buried at Pacific View Memorial Park in Newport Beach, California.

== Criticisms and controversies ==
In 2000, Crouch was sued for $40 million by author Sylvia Fleener, who accused Crouch of plagiarism in his popular end-times novel (and subsequent movie), The Omega Code. Fleener's lawsuit alleged that the movie's plot was taken from her own novel, The Omega Syndrome. A former Crouch personal assistant, Kelly Whitmore, revealed that she had encountered a loose-leaf binder in Jan Crouch's luggage that the Crouches referred to as "the End Times project" and that he often called it "The Omega" but said he disliked the working title, "especially the word 'Syndrome'. After the defendant's motion for summary judgment failed the case was settled out of court for an undisclosed sum.

In September 2004, the Los Angeles Times reported that in 1998 Crouch paid Enoch Lonnie Ford, a former employee, a $425,000 formal settlement to end a wrongful termination lawsuit. The paper also reported that Ford had alleged a sexual relationship between the two men. TBN officials denied the allegations. On March 15, 2005, Ford appeared at the taping of the Pax TV show Lie Detector. The show's producers decided not to air the show, and the outcome of the lie detector test was never released.

A May 2012 New York Times article reported on the personal spending of Paul and Jan Crouch, including "his-and-her mansions one street apart in a gated community" in Newport Beach, California. Paul Crouch received $400,000 in executive salary as president and his wife $365,000 as first vice president of TBN. Brittany Koper, a granddaughter of the Crouches who had authority over finances, claimed that TBN appeared to have violated the IRS ban on "excess compensation" by nonprofit organizations.

== Bibliography ==
- Hello World! A Personal Message to the Body of Christ. (autobiography) (Nelson, 2003) ISBN 0-7852-6312-8
- I Had No Father But God
- The Omega Code: Another Has Risen from the Dead
- Megiddo: The Omega Code 2
- Shadow of the Apocalypse. (Berkley Trade, October 5, 2004) ISBN 0-425-20011-6

== Awards and citations ==
- Parents Television Council Seal of Approval for TBN
- Parents Television Council Seal of Approval for JCTV (now JUCE TV)
- Parents Television Council Seal of Approval for Smile of a Child TV
- Appointed by President Ronald Reagan to the Private Sector Initiative Project
- In May, 2009, the United Nations officially recommended the Smile of a Child Foundation to receive special consultative status with the Economic and Social Council for the Democracy Coalition Project
