= Maximum Bob (TV series) =

Television series

- The show's titlecard, showing characters Wanda Grace, Leanne Gibbs, "Maximum" Bob Gibbs, Kathy Baker and Sheriff Gary Hammond
- Genre: Comedy drama Legal drama
- Based on: Maximum Bob (novel) by Elmore Leonard
- Developed by: Alex Gansa
- Starring: Beau Bridges; Liz Vassey; Sam Robards; Kiersten Warren; Rae'Ven Larrymore Kelly
- Composer: David Schwartz
- Country of origin: United States
- Original language: English
- No. of seasons: 1
- No. of episodes: 7

Production
- Executive producers: Alex Gansa; Barry Sonnenfeld; Barry Josephson
- Running time: 60 minutes
- Production companies: Sonnenfeld Josephson Worldwide Entertainment; Warner Bros. Television

Original release
- Network: ABC
- Release: August 4 – September 15, 1998

Maximum Bob is an American legal comedy-drama television series that aired on ABC from August 4 until September 15, 1998. Starring Beau Bridges, the show was based on Elmore Leonard's 1991 novel of the same name.

== Premise ==
The series centered on Bob Gibbs (played by Bridges), an ultra right-wing judge known for giving the maximum sentence to defendants. Other characters included the judge's psychic wife Leanne (Kiersten Warren) who channels the spirit of a young slave girl named Wanda Grace (Rae'Ven Larrymore Kelly); a widower sheriff with a knack for ballroom dancing; and Kathy Baker, a comely spitfire public defender (Liz Vassey) from Miami. The storylines served mainly to introduce the cast of eccentric characters, and were set in the fictional backwoods Florida town of Deepwater.

Judge Gibbs's young wife performed in a mermaid show until she nearly lost her life to an alligator, after which she abruptly retired from the business and can no longer even go in her swimming pool. Baker comes to Deepwater on a case and becomes a romantic target for the local sheriff, as well as a potential conquest for the always lustful judge. The show also includes a family of inbred, myopic, dysfunctional people with a criminal bent.

== Cast ==
- Beau Bridges as Judge Bob Gibbs
- Liz Vassey as Kathy Baker
- Sam Robards as Sheriff Gary Hammond
- Kiersten Warren as Leanne Lancaster
- Rae'Ven Larrymore Kelly as Wanda Grace

== Episodes ==
No.	Title	Directed by	Written by	Original release date	Prod. code
1	"Pilot"	Barry Sonnenfeld	Alex Gansa	August 4, 1998	475130
Public defender Kathy Baker visits the small Florida town of Deepwater to defend a young client being used as a pawn by a politically minded judge. She stumbles onto the town's many peculiarities including a criminally minded backwoods family, an abusive deputy, alligators running rampant, and a crazed environmentalist, all presided over by an eccentric judge, "Maximum" Bob Gibbs.
2	"Wandalust"	John David Coles	Story by : Alex Gansa & Topper Lilien; Teleplay by : Alex Gansa	August 11, 1998	467201
Bob "borrows" a convict from the prison to serve as his personal gardener, leading to problems when Wanda Grace chooses him to be her first love. Leanne willingly donates her body for Wanda's use. Bob bursts in, leading to a large manhunt and a kidnapped baby.
3	"Bay of Big's"	Marc Buckland	Theresa Rebeck	August 18, 1998	467203
Bob enjoys the satisfaction when he busts he ex-wife Rosellen for smuggling Cuban cigars into the country. His satisfaction is short-lived when two federal agents arrive, claiming that Rosellen is a federal operative. Determined to get to the bottom of things, Bob spies on Rosellen and in the process gets captured and held hostage by Cuban Freedom Fighters. Meanwhile, in another part of Deepwater, Kathy and Sheriff Hammond practice for an upcoming dance contest.
4	"A Little Tail"	Todd Holland	Molly Newman	August 25, 1998	467204
Kathy represents a man being refused a job as a mermaid. Dirk and Bogart Crowe refuse to return their pet manatee to its rightful owner. Kathy represents her estranged husband Kevin after he is brought before Judge Gibbs for traffic violations. Kevin tries to convince Kathy he is a changed man.
5	"Good Dog Karl"	Elodie Keene	Rick Cleveland	September 1, 1998	467205
Kathy befriends a dog that saved her life. Meanwhile, the whole town is up in arms over a beast of some sort that attacked a young woman, biting off three fingers. According to witnesses (the Crowe family) the beast was either a Gatorman or the Okeechobee Wolfman. Judge Gibbs hires an exorcist to cast out Wanda Grace.
6	"Dead Babe Walking"	Félix Enríquez Alcalá	Story by : Rick Kellard & Bob Comfort; Teleplay by : Rick Kellard	September 8, 1998	467202
Bob falls for Angelyne, a born-again death row inmate. After 'Old Sparky' blows a fuse, Bob works with Kathy to find a way to let the prisoner off the hook. Meanwhile, Inez Crowe comes to work as Leanne's personal aide.
7	"Once Bitten..."	Kenneth Fink	Roger Garrett	September 15, 1998	467206
Judge Gibbs' gubernatorial campaign is temporarily derailed by allegations of sexual assault leveled by a former intern. Elvin Crowe and Sheriff Gary hunt down Sonny and another convict after the two break out of prison.
