= The Omega Code =

- Theatrical release poster
- Directed by: Rob Marcarelli
- Written by: Stephan Blinn; Hollis Barton
- Produced by: Matthew Crouch; Lawrence Mortorff; Rob Marcarelli
- Starring: Casper Van Dien; Michael York; Catherine Oxenberg; Michael Ironside
- Cinematography: Carlos González
- Edited by: Katina Zinner; Peter Zinner
- Music by: Alan Howarth; Harry Manfredini
- Production companies: Gener8Xion Entertainment; TBN Films
- Distributed by: Providence Entertainment
- Release date: October 15, 1999
- Running time: 100 minutes
- Country: United States
- Language: English
- Budget: $7.2–8 million
- Box office: $12.6 million

The Omega Code is a 1999 apocalyptic thriller film directed by Rob Marcarelli, written by Stephen Blinn and Hollis Barton, and starring Casper Van Dien, Michael York, Catherine Oxenberg and Michael Ironside. The premillennialist plot revolves around a plan by the Antichrist (York) to take over the world by using information hidden in the titular Bible code.

The independently produced film was financed and distributed by the Trinity Broadcasting Network, whose head, televangelist Paul Crouch, wrote a novelization of the film's screenplay. The film received a limited theaterical release in the United States on October 15, 1999, grossing $12 million against a $7.2–8 million budget, before being released on home video by GoodTimes Entertainment.

Despite its extremely negative reception, in 2001, the film had a sequel entitled Megiddo: The Omega Code 2, which serves partly as a prequel as well as an alternate retelling of the first film's eschatological plot. While it had a significantly larger budget than the original, it was even more poorly received than the original.

== Plot ==
In Jerusalem, rabbi Rostenburg designs software to decode prophecies hidden within the Torah. Rostenburg handwrites each one in a journal. One of the prophecies says that he is about to die; he tears the page containing the final code from his journal and hides it. Assassin Dominic then kills him and takes Rostenburg's journal and the disc containing the program. After Dominic leaves, two prophets retrieve the hidden page.

Meanwhile, media mogul and European Union Chairman Stone Alexander has all but eliminated world hunger through advances in nutritional technology. Alexander sees a prophecy (deciphered with Rostenburg's stolen program) that leads him to ask Dr. Gillen Lane, a popular author and motivational speaker, to become his Minister of Information.

Using each prophecy the program deciphers to guide him, Alexander works toward world domination. Part of his plan is secretly arranging for the bombings of Muslim and Jewish holy sites in Israel. In Jerusalem, American reporter Cassandra Barris is caught up in one of the blasts. The prophets take her from the rubble. Alexander uses the sites' rebuilding to help forge a groundbreaking Middle East peace treaty. Most national governments agree to join a ten-state "World Union", of which Alexander is chairman.

Cassandra delivers to Lane a warning that the prophets gave her. The warning leads Lane to discover the decoding facility where Alexander's staff uses the program. Lane secretly leafs through printouts of previously deciphered codes and deduces what is going on. Alexander and Dominic, who is his apprentice, then appear. Alexander asks Lane to be "my spokesman for this new world, my visionary, my prophet." Believing himself to be the only rightful aspirant to the position, Dominic shoots Alexander dead. Dominic alerts security, claiming that Lane did it. Lane escapes and runs into Cassandra. She is loyal to Alexander and eventually captures him.

Meanwhile, Satan enters Alexander's body, healing it. Seven of the ten World Union leaders agree that Alexander will be appointed "Chancellor of the United World" in a ceremony to be held at the Temple Mount in Jerusalem, coincident with the reopening of Solomon's Temple.

At the ceremony in Jerusalem, the now Chancellor Alexander proclaims that he has "become king and god!" The crowd becomes upset. Out of the growing tumult, the prophets appear, identifying Alexander as the Abomination of Desolation, predicting that they would be resurrected three days after their deaths. Alexander has Dominic kill them both, and put them on display as an example of what happens to those who oppose him. He leaves for his compound in Rome, as Dominic says that "the Israelis and several others are seceding." Alexander plots a military action, including a nuclear strike.

At Lane's holding cell, demons swirl around him, tormenting him; Lane prays to God and Jesus. The demons are then scattered, Lane's cell door opens, and he exits. Meanwhile, the prophets are resurrected.

Lane, trying to find Alexander, runs into Dominic instead. Dominic is about to kill him when the prophets appear. They strangle Dominic without touching him, and give Lane the page with the final code. Taking Dominic's gun, Lane confronts Alexander and Cassandra, who plan to commence the attack. Alexander uses this as a bargaining chip to get Lane to give him the code; Lane agrees, typing it into the program. Once he does, however, Alexander reveals that he never intended to call off the attack. He is about to give the final authorization to attack, when a white light appears on the horizon, expanding through the entire surrounding area. As it reaches Alexander's war room, its appearance is accompanied by a strong wind. While Lane stands safely within it, it blows through Alexander violently enough to cause Satan to fly behind him. Satan is blown away, out of sight. Alexander's wounds are restored, leaving him dead again.

The light eventually covers the entire Earth. After deciphering the final code, Rostenburg's program shows the following text: "0000 ... Dawn of New Millennium".

== Cast ==
- Casper Van Dien as Gillen Lane
- Michael York as Stone Alexander/The Antichrist
- Catherine Oxenberg as Cassandra Barashe
- Michael Ironside as Dominic
- Devon Odessa as Jennifer Lane
- William Hootkins as Sir Percival Lloyd
- Robert Ito as Shimoro Lin Che
- Steve Franken as Jeffries
- Janet Carroll as Dorothy Thompson
- George Coe as Senator Jack Thompson
- Ravil Isyanov as Dr. Rykoff
- Ayla Kell as Maddie Lane
- Jan Triska as Prophet
- Terry Rhoads as Reporter Matthews
- Lise Simms as Talk show host
- Robert F. Lyons as General

== Production and distribution ==
The film was produced by Code Productions in conjunction with Eclipse Catering, TBN's Gener8Xion Entertainment and TBN Films. It was first aired on Trinity Broadcasting Network in 1999, and then distributed by the now bankrupt Good Times Home Video Corporation to both VHS and DVD formats in 2000, and released over the internet in 2002. The film is available in digital media at iTunes Store and Google Play Store for Apple and Android owners to purchase.

Other distributors

- Higher Dreams (1999) (Spain) (theatrical)
- Providence Entertainment (1999) (USA, theatrical)
- At Entertainment (2000) (Japan, on video)
- Eagle Entertainment (2001) (Australia, theatrical)
- Argentina Video Home (Argentina, video)
- Califórnia Home Vídeo (Brazil, VHS only)
- Dutch FilmWorks (DFW) (2001) (Netherlands only on DVD)
- GoodTimes Home Video (2000) (2002) (USA, only on DVD)
- Laurus Entertainment (2001) (Netherlands) (VHS)
- RTL Entertainment (2003) (Netherlands) (TV, RTL5) (broadcast premiere)

== Influences ==
The prophets' public denunciation of Alexander as the Anti-Christ, their immediate death at the hands of his primary enforcer, and subsequent resurrection from the dead, are drawn from "A Short Tale of the Anti-Christ" by Russian Orthodox theologian and philosopher Vladimir Solovyov. In Solovyov's depiction, however, they are instead the three leaders of the world's remaining Roman Catholics, Eastern Orthodox, and conservative Protestants.

== Reception ==
The film received mostly negative reviews. Rotten Tomatoes gives The Omega Code a rating of 8%, based on reviews from 25 critics, with the critic consensus being "Mysticism, overacting, and overall gimcrackery eventually weigh down the story." Metacritic, which uses a weighted average, assigned the film a score of 14 out of 100, based on 9 critics, indicating "overwhelming dislike".

Joe Leydon, writing in Variety, describes the movie as "laughably simplistic and confoundingly muddled." Chris Willman of Entertainment Weekly wrote that the film "gives 'Great Tribulation' new meaning," and give the film an overall grade D−. MaryAnn Johanson called Casper Van Dien's acting "shocking[ly] incompeten[t]."
