= Noëlle (2007 film) =

- Theatrical release poster
- Directed by: David Wall
- Written by: David Wall
- Produced by: David Wall; Kerry Wall; Sean Patrick Brennan; Lenny Manzo
- Starring: David Wall; Kerry Wall; Sean Patrick Brennan
- Edited by: Beecher Cotton
- Music by: Andrew Ingkavet
- Production company: Volo Films
- Distributed by: Gener8Xion Entertainment
- Release date: December 7, 2007
- Running time: 90 minutes
- Country: United States
- Language: English
- Box office: $257,868

Noëlle (also referred to as Mrs. Worthington's Party) is a 2007 drama film written, produced, and directed by David Wall who also stars as Father Jonathan Keene, a Catholic priest who comes to a small American fishing village in the Christmas season to shut down a dying parish, only to experience a personal transformation as he encounters the eccentric townspeople.

Shot on location on Cape Cod, Noëlle was originally produced under the title Mrs. Worthington's Party by Volo Films (David Wall's production banner) and won two awards at the 2006 Fort Lauderdale International Film Festival for Best Director and Best American Indie 1st Runner Up. The film was picked up for commercial distribution by independent film company Gener8Xion Entertainment and was released in theaters on December 7, 2007.

== Plot ==
Father Jonathan Keene goes to a small fishing village a week before Christmas to shut down a dying parish.

When he gets there, he finds that the congregation has dropped from 150 to 20 under Simeon's leadership.

While Simeon takes Father Keene around the parish, Keene sees a young woman he had seen at the bus station when he first arrived in the village. He returns her glove he accidentally picked up when they bumped into each other. The woman introduces herself as Marjorie Worthington but quickly excuses herself to return to having a rather animated discussion with her boyfriend.

Later, at a rehearsal for the Nativity play, Simeon tells the parishioners that Father Keene is there to take over the parish and leaves, turning over the production to Keene. Keene asks Marjorie to play Mary as she is the only woman he has seen in town that is under 60, but she turns the role down saying that she 'isn't Mary.' As an atheist, she views a virgin birth as being preposterous. Keene counters that she believes in evolution, that billions of years ago, a single cell developed into a fish, then an amphibian, then dinosaurs, mammals, apes, and finally humans—all by pure chance. He asks her with that belief, what is so hard to imagine that a teenage girl could get pregnant and bear the Son of God? Marjorie tells Keene that she'll think about it.

A few days later, a woman goes into the Confessional and tells Father Keene that she overheard Marjorie and her boyfriend Seth talking and Marjorie is pregnant with Seth's baby even though he has a wife in New York. Soon afterwards, Marjorie arrives and tells Keene that she decided to take the role of Mary in the play. Keene responds by rejecting Marjorie and shaming her for her promiscuous life. She definitely 'isn't Mary.' Marjorie tells him that she found out Seth was married and that she has ended their relationship.

On Christmas Eve, Simeon tells Keene that he wants to marry Marjorie and is quitting the priesthood. Only a couple of people turn up to perform the Nativity and they tell Keene that there's no point in doing it and leave to go to Mrs. Worthington's Christmas party like everybody else. Keene decides to go as well.

At the party, Keene sees Seth flirting with another woman, and gets into a fight with him, ending up with a deep gash on his cheek. He goes outside and meets Marjorie who tends to his wound. Keene opens up to Marjorie telling her that everywhere he goes he sees a spirit of a little girl. The girl, he explains, is the daughter he forced his girlfriend to abort when they were at university, and that he never wanted to be a priest, he just did it out of guilt. Simeon observes the conversation and realizes that Keene loves Marjorie.

Later, Marjorie goes into labor after trying to run away. Father Keene hears about this and runs to visit her in the hospital. As he looks at Marjorie's premature newborn baby through the window, Noëlle, the spirit of his daughter, forgives him.

Simeon meanwhile, who went to the church to say goodbye to Father Keene, is elated to see that the church is full.

Four years later, Simeon is directing the church Nativity. Grace, Marjorie's daughter, whom Keene presumably adopted after marrying her mother, plays the part of the angel announcing to the shepherds. Then she runs to Keene and hugs him. Simeon is still the pastor of the now thriving church.

== Cast ==
- David Wall stars as Father Jonathan Keene, a "hit man" for the Catholic Church whose job is to shut down parishes that are no longer deemed viable.
- Kerry Wall plays Marjorie Worthington, the town's librarian.
- Sean Patrick Brennan plays Father Simeon Joyce, the pastor of the dying parish that Keene has come to shut down.
- Curt Dewitz plays Seth Harrod, Marjorie's boyfriend.
- Brennan Wall plays Noelle, a spirit that only Father Keene sees.
- Jean Bates plays Eleanor Worthington, Marjorie's grandmother and the host of the village's Christmas party.
- David Hickey plays Thomas Shepley.
- Ciaran O'Reilly plays Finn Shepley.
- Kevin McElroy plays Jewel King.
- J. Scott Henderson plays Swift King.
- Michael Sweet plays Speed King.

== Production ==
Writer-producer-director-actor David Wall drew inspiration for Noëlle when he was living on Cape Cod where an annual Christmas party was held at an "old whaling captain's house" that was "down the street" from Wall's home where people from varying socio-economic-religious backgrounds gathered, "celebrating one thing -- Christmas."

Noëlle was filmed on 35mm film and features the cinematography of Beecher Cotton who "does justice to the stark beauty of the Cape."

Noëlle features some Cape Cod landmarks such as the Cape Cod Hospital, the Sandwich Boardwalk, an East Dennis library, the beaches of Dennis Port, a church in Yarmouth Port, and O'Shea's Olde Inne restaurant on Route 28 in West Dennis.

== Release ==
Noëlle was released in theaters nationwide on 203 screens on December 7, 2007, by Gener8Xion Entertainment. The release strategy involved targeting Gener8Xion's audiences in major markets across the country with the film being screened in the best performing theaters from Gener8Xion's previous theatrical released film One Night with the King.

== Reception ==
On the review aggregator website Rotten Tomatoes, 50% of 6 critics' reviews are positive.
