= Trinity Music City =

Entertainment venue in Hendersonville, Tennessee, United States

Coordinates: 36°19′27.31″N 86°33′50.49″W

Trinity Music City is a broadcasting complex in Hendersonville, Tennessee. The complex was opened in 1982 by country singer Conway Twitty as Twitty City, serving as both his home and as a country music venue.

After Twitty's death in 1993, the venue was bought by Christian broadcaster Trinity Broadcasting Network (TBN), serving as a Christian music venue and the studios of their Nashville area station WPGD-TV. In December 2023, the property suffered extensive damage following a tornado outbreak.

== History ==
It was first the home of singer Conway Twitty from its opening in 1982 until his death in 1993. He built the house, which also was a country music entertainment complex, and was known as Twitty City at a cost of over $3.5 million. The complex included homes for Twitty's mother as well as his children, as well as an auditorium, museum, and shop. It was shut down in 1994 following a year-long tribute show called Final Touches, when fans and peers in the music business visited. The complex was auctioned off and bought by the Trinity Broadcasting Network that same year. The venue was renamed to Trinity Music City immediately after. The facility became known for its lavish Christmas decorations.

On July 3, 2016, Trinity Music City stopped holding public tours. In October 2017, TBN began to produce Huckabee—a talk show hosted by former Arkansas Governor Mike Huckabee (and a revival of his former show on Fox News Channel)—from the facility, after which TBN began to promote the auditorium as the "Huckabee Theater".

TBN had plans to redevelop the property to include a new studio and senior living facilities. These plans accelerated following a tornado outbreak on December 9, 2023, which heavily damaged the property. TBN officials issued redevelopment proposals to Hendersonville's planning commission, including a new studio that would preserve some of the memorabilia from Twitty City. The commission displayed concerns over the proposed demolition of Twitty's mansion as part of these redevelopments.
