= Jan Crouch =

American religious broadcaster

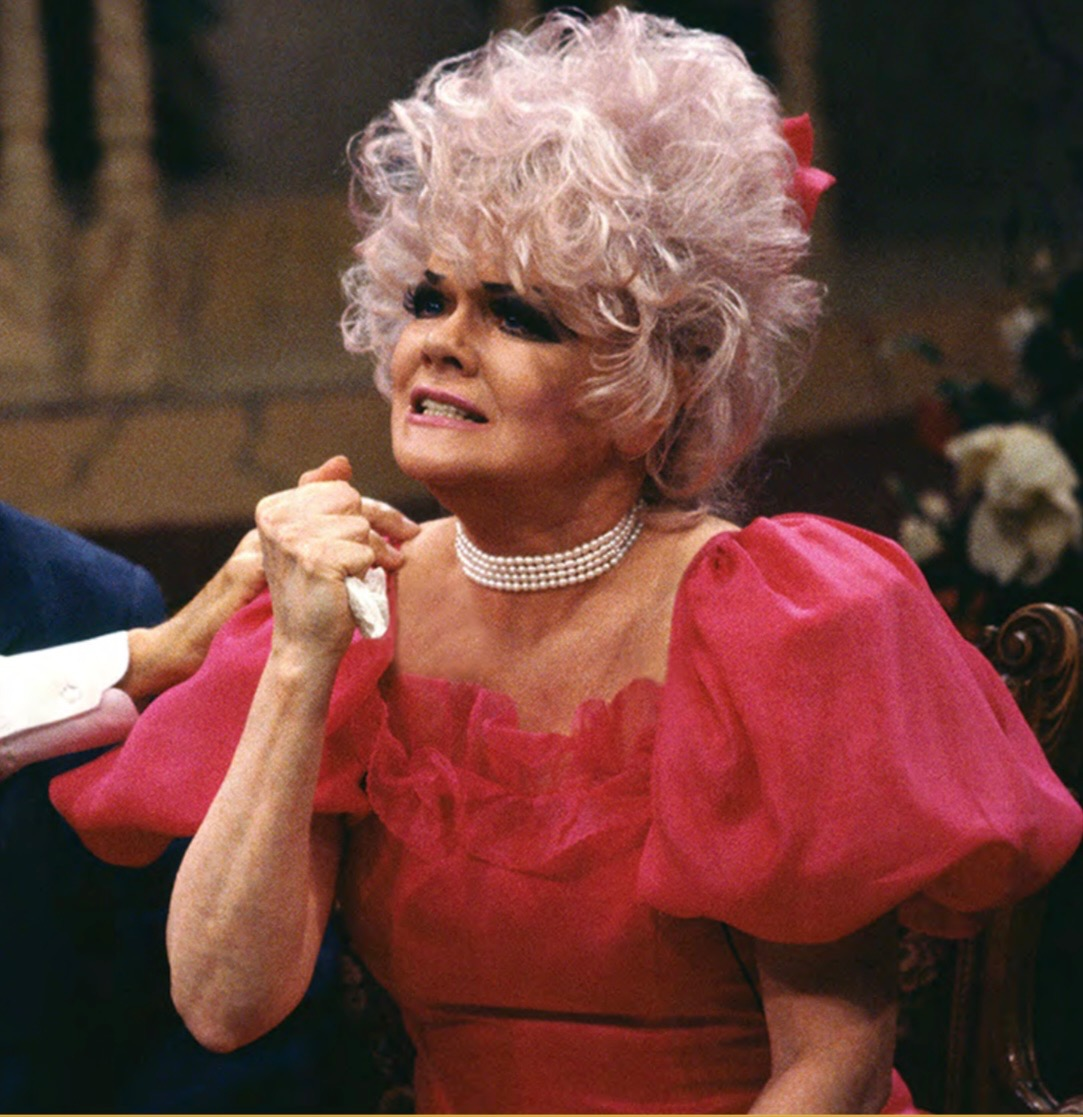
- Born: Janice Wendell Bethany; March 14, 1938; New Brockton, Alabama, U.S.
- Died: May 31, 2016 (aged 78); Orlando, Florida, U.S.
- Occupation: Co-founder of Trinity Broadcasting Network
- Title: Vice President and Director of Network Programming/TBN, Director/CEO of Holy Land Experience
- Spouse: Paul Crouch (m. 1957; died 2013)
- Children: Paul Crouch, Jr.; Matthew Crouch

Janice Wendell Crouch (/kraʊtʃ/) (née Bethany; March 14, 1938 – May 31, 2016) was an American religious broadcaster. Crouch and her husband, Paul, founded the Trinity Broadcasting Network (TBN) in 1973.

== Early life and ministry ==
Crouch was the daughter of Reverend and Mrs. Edgar W. Bethany, and grew up in Columbus, Georgia. Her father served as an Assemblies of God pastor, and was the founding president of Southeastern University (Florida). While attending Evangel College in Springfield, Missouri, Crouch met Paul F. Crouch. They married in 1957, and have two sons, Paul Jr. and Matthew. Jan Crouch also loved children and was well known in the early days of TBN for a child's puppet (a little pink girl in a dress) she called Babushka.

== TBN ==
=== Founding ===
In 1973, Paul and Jan Crouch co-founded Trinity Broadcasting Network (TBN) along with Jim and Tammy Faye Bakker (the Bakkers left in 1975). In 1974, TBN purchased its first TV station, KLXA-TV (channel 40, now KTBN-TV) in Southern California, and began distribution through cable systems in 1978. Under the Crouch family, TBN grew to become the United States' largest Christian television network, offering 24-hour commercial-free programming, and TBN is currently the third-largest over-the-air station group in the United States (measured as percentage of homes reached), with CBS, Fox, and NBC holding the 4th, 5th and 6th place, according to TV News Check's annual listing of the Top 30 station groups.

=== Growth of TBN ===
Since its founding, Crouch served as TBN's vice president and director of network programming, as well as the director of programming for TBN's affiliated networks, such as the Smile of a Child children's channel, the JUCE TV youth network, The Church Channel, the TBN Enlace USA Spanish language network, and others. She was also the President and manager of The Holy Land Experience theme park in Orlando, Florida. Jan Crouch and her husband Paul Crouch, senior also signed off on Matt Crouch (TBN) and his wife Laurie—now in charge at TBN, i.e. PTL (Praise the Lord) their signature & original show, as now becoming rather the primary hosts, as well as Behind the Scenes— to have produced over 4 major motion pictures, along with other associated and film entertainment groups to make namely faith-based movies like 'End Times' films The Omega Code (1999) and its sequel Megiddo: The Omega Code 2 (2001).

== Lawsuits ==
In March 2012, Crouch was accused by her granddaughter Brittany Koper, a former employee and chief finance director of the network (a registered charity), of misappropriating network funds to spend on a lavish lifestyle. Expenditures included expensive homes, private jets, massive custom wigs, numerous face lifts and breast augmentations and a $100,000 air conditioned mobile home solely for her dogs. The New York Times wrote that Crouch, for nearly two years, rented adjoining rooms for herself and her two Maltese dogs at the deluxe Loews Portofino Bay Hotel while she was building the Holy Land Experience theme park in Orlando, Florida. The suit includes allegations that Jan had an affair with a Holy Land Experience employee.

Also in 2012, another of Crouch's granddaughters sued TBN, alleging that she had been molested and raped by a TBN employee at the age of 13. She alleged that Jan Crouch screamed at her and blamed her for the assault. The employee was subsequently fired but was never reported to authorities. Crouch's lawyers said the network was attempting to cover it up to prevent a scandal, but a spokesperson for the network said they acted on what her mother had told them to do. In 2017, a year after Crouch's death, a jury awarded the granddaughter $2 million in damages for past and future "mental suffering."

== Illness and death ==
Crouch suffered a massive stroke on May 25, 2016, and was hospitalized. She died in Orlando, Florida, on May 31, 2016, at age 78.

== Awards and honors ==
- 1990: Honorary Doctor of Humane Letters degree from Oral Roberts University
- Golden Angel Award – Excellence in Media
- Two-time Parents Television Council Entertainment Seal of Approval recipient (for TBN and Smile of a Child).
