= Megiddo: The Omega Code 2 =

2001 film by Brian Trenchard-Smith

- Theatrical release poster
- Directed by: Brian Trenchard-Smith
- Written by: Stephan Blinn; Hollis Barton; John Fasano
- Based on: Characters by Stephan Blinn; Hollis Barton
- Produced by: Matthew Crouch; Lawrence Mortorff; Richard J. Cook
- Starring: Michael York; Michael Biehn; Diane Venora; R. Lee Ermey; Udo Kier; Franco Nero
- Cinematography: Albert J. Dunk
- Edited by: John Lafferty
- Music by: Peter Bernstein
- Production company: Gener8Xion Entertainment; Code Productions; Infinity Omnimedia; TBN
- Distributed by: Gener8Xion Entertainment; TBN Films
- Release dates: September 7, 2001 (TV premiere); September 21, 2001 (US theatrical)
- Running time: 104 minutes
- Country: United States
- Language: English
- Budget: $20 million
- Box office: $6 million

Megiddo: The Omega Code 2 is a 2001 American apocalyptic action film directed by Brian Trenchard-Smith and starring Michael York, Michael Biehn, Diane Venora, R. Lee Ermey, Udo Kier and Franco Nero. It is a follow-up to the 1999 film The Omega Code, though rather than a direct continuation, it serves as part prequel and part alternate retelling.

Like its predecessor, Megiddo was co-produced by the Trinity Broadcasting Network (TBN) and premiered there. It had a significantly larger budget ($20 million) than its predecessor ($7.6 million), but was less enthusiastically received. It has developed a cult following in some circles, and Nathan Rabin described it as "delirious, top-notch camp."

== Plot ==
Stone Alexander is a six-year-old boy whose mother has died giving birth to his younger brother, David. During a party at his influential father's home, Stone is left alone with David, who is in his crib. As Stone stares into the fireplace, a fiery force possesses him. Stone attempts to burn David, who is saved by their nanny. Their father, Daniel, sends Stone away to a military academy in Italy for his education, under the guidance of General Francini.

At the academy, Stone is drawn to a church, meets his demonic Guardian and participates in a black mass ceremony. Years pass, and although Stone is periodically abused by some classmates, he eventually earns their respect, becoming his class's top student . After graduating, Stone marries Gabriella, Francini's daughter. Francini is initially against their marriage, but Stone summons two demons to intimidate him into giving in.

Eventually, Stone becomes President of the European Union. (Note: Preceded by Stone accepting a lesser position with the European Union in 1976. This is an anachronism, as the European Union was not established until 17 years later (although its forerunner, the European Communities, did exist at that time).) Over 200 people who oppose him die under questionable circumstances after close contact. Stone uses his seat of power to dissolve the United Nations and create the World Union, a world government. To consolidate his power, he pressures the president of the United States Richard Benson to join the World Union. (Note: In the movie's dialogue, the United States is sometimes equated with "the North American Zone"; however, a stylized world map appears to show all of North America as a single zone, and Mexico is portrayed in the film as a country distinct from the United States.) Stone summons Benson to meet with him in Rome. Before departing for Italy, Benson orders the U.S. Navy's Sixth Fleet to take up position off of the coast of Italy in the event of an emergency.

Accompanying Benson on his flight is David, who is now the vice president of the United States, and the president's military aide, U.S. Marine Colonel Rick Howard. Stone eventually kills Benson with a supernaturally induced heart attack, and David is sworn in as the new president.

Much to Stone's disappointment, David also refuses to join the World Union. After failing to change David's mind, Secretary of State Breckenridge publicizes a doctored video of David murdering Daniel. In reality, it was Stone who killed him.

Breckenridge orders the FBI to arrest David. After an exchange of gunfire between the Secret Service detail and the FBI agents, David escapes by helicopter to Norfolk Naval Base, where the U.S. Navy brass provides him with transport to the Sixth Fleet. After arriving, David orders a raid on Stone's castle headquarters in Rome; however, Stone is already in Israel. David finds Gabriella in the dungeon, confined there by the Guardian after she witnessed some of Stone's demonic powers. She dies in David's arms after professing her love. Following the raid, Howard receives word that Breckenridge is sending U.S. troops to Israel to join Stone's military coalition, which is on the plains of Megiddo planning a strike on Jerusalem.

Following the raid in Rome, David and Howard quietly join U.S. forces already in Israel. The Mexicans, Chinese, and Americans are secretly there to destroy Stone and his army. David attempts to kill Stone himself but is captured.

Later, the strike against Stone's European troops commences. David breaks free and flees before Stone's headquarters explode. Stone, however, walks out of the ashes unharmed. He then morphs into the devil himself. After fatally wounding David, Stone/Satan summons up his brethren as reinforcements and revives his dead army. He also darkens the sun, plunging the battlefield into darkness.

The reinforcements soon outnumbered and overrun their enemies. Stone/Satan, celebrates as he cries out that he is Lord. At this boast, a bright white light appears. All of Stone's soldiers are killed by the light, while all of the allied survivors remain untouched, and are freed from their bonds. Distraught, Stone's former Guardian tries to flee, but a globe of light eventually vaporizes him. Stone/Satan himself is driven to his knees and forced to admit that Jesus is the one true Lord. The light then pulverizes the ground beneath him, dropping Stone/Satan into a pit of molten lava. At the lake of fire, he is chained and screams in anguish. As David looks up into the sky smiling, the light becomes brighter, then fades away, revealing a scene of an Earthly paradise.

== Cast ==
- Michael York as Stone Alexander
  - Noah Huntley as Stone (age 21)
- Michael Biehn as David Alexander
  - Chad Michael Murray as David (age 16)
- Diane Venora as Gabriella Francini-Alexander
  - Elisa Scialpi as Gabriella (age 18)
- R. Lee Ermey as President Richard Benson
- Udo Kier as The Guardian
- Franco Nero as General Francini
- Jim Metzler as Secretary of State Breckenridge
- David Hedison as Daniel Alexander
- Eduardo Yáñez as Mexican General García
- Michael Paul Chan as Chinese premier
- Oleg Stefan as Russian president Kachitsky
- Guy Siner as British prime minister
- Gil Colon as Colonel Rick Howard
- Tony Amendola as Father Timarco
- Forbes Riley as Dana Kincaid
- Greg Ellis as Agent Harris
- Tim Colceri as Admiral Hansen

== Production ==
Director Brian Trenchard-Smith, an atheist, later said he only took the job because it gave him an opportunity to direct large-scale war scenes, with his highest budget to date,

Ever since seeing Sydney Pollack's great ironic World War two movie Castle Keep (1969), I have wanted to stage modern war at an ancient castle. Megiddo (2001) provided the perfect opportunity at Castle Ordeski in Brac-chiano, where indenta-tions of cannonballs from a sixteenth-century siege are still visible on the walls. We, however, didn't leave a scratch as twelve Apache helicopters strafed the battlements, while US Army Rangers rappelled down and fought their way in. This is because our choppers are digital, intercut with stuntmen rappelling from off-screen scaffolding. This kind of sequence would have been prohibitive, even with my $18 million budget, until the computer graphic era. In the battle scenes we can digitally multiply tents and tanks on the ground and add Harriers and helicopter gunships to the skies.

Shooting took place mainly in Southern California and Rome, with some location shooting in Jerusalem, Nairobi, Madrid and Santiago. Due to budget limitations, shots of Air Force One in flight were recycled from the film Air Force One (1997), while some tank footage was recycled from The Beast (1988).

Lead actor Michael York detailed the making of the film in a journal which he then published in book form, titled Dispatches from Armageddon: Making the Movie Megiddo...a Devilish Diary!.

== Release ==
Megiddo: The Omega Code 2 premiered on the Trinity Broadcasting Network (TBN) on September 7, 2001, before receiving a theatrical release on September 21.

== Reception ==
=== Box office ===
Unlike the first film, Megiddo was a box office bomb, grossing only $6 million from a $20 million budget.

=== Critical response ===
Megiddo: The Omega Code 2 was panned by critics. On Rotten Tomatoes it has an approval rating of 10% based on reviews from 20 critics. Scott Foundas wrote for Variety, "Boasting a bigger, more handsomely mounted production, this is also a duller, more sullen affair." Marc Savlov wrote for The Austin Chronicle, "Very, very bad (though sporadically entertaining, like an old CBS Movie of the Week high on millennial jitters)." Chris William wrote for Entertainment Weekly, "A step forward in budget and coherence from the first Omega Code ... but will still have even much of its evangelical target audience stifling unholy snickers."

Conversely, Nathan Rabin of The A.V. Club praised the film for its camp value, writing "Delirious, top-notch camp for viewers of all faiths and denominations, Megiddo: Omega Code 2 offers so much goofy fun, it's sinful." Tim Brayton of Alternate Ending said "The English language isn't up to the task of demonstrating how richly, excessively campy [Michael York] is here."

=== Accolades ===
Cinematographer Albert J. Dunk was nominated for Best Cinematography in Theatrical Feature at the 2002 Canadian Society of Cinematographers Awards.

== See also ==
- Armageddon
