= JUCE TV =

American Christian television network, 2002–2020

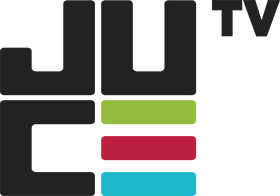
- Final logo used from 2014 to 2020
- Country: United States
- Headquarters: Tustin, California, United States

Programming
- Language: English
- Picture format: 480i (SDTV)

Ownership
- Owner: Trinity Broadcasting Network
- Sister channels: Trinity Broadcasting Network; Hillsong Channel; Smile; Enlace; TBN Salsa; Radio Paradise

History
- Launched: February 18, 2002; 23 years ago
- Closed: January 26, 2020; 5 years ago (as a television network)
- Replaced by: Positiv (network)
- Former names: JCTV (2002–2013)

Links
- Website: www.jucetv.com

JUCE TV was an American youth-oriented Christian digital brand and formerly an American Christian television network owned and operated by the Trinity Broadcasting Network. The channel was aimed at teenagers and young adults between the ages of 13 and 30 years, and features a format similar to MTV and MTVU, airing Christian music videos, and original content such as Christian-themed entertainment and lifestyle programming, along with some church services.

JUCE TV was carried over-the-air on digital subchannels of TBN owned-and-operated and affiliated stations nationwide, usually on the third subchannel. JUCE TV was also available on pay television providers as well as on select digital streaming platforms that offered TBN's six U.S. networks.

== History ==
=== As a youth-oriented Christian network ===
The network, originally named JCTV, launched at 5:00 p.m. Pacific Time on February 18, 2002. The network was founded by Paul Crouch Sr., founder of the Trinity Broadcasting Network (TBN), who intended to develop a service targeted at Christian youth worldwide. The service would eventually reach most of North America, Europe, Asia and South America through its broadcast service as well as TBN's streaming platforms. The network incorporated original programming (including adventure sports and faith-based reality series), traditional pastoral programs aimed at the network's target audience, and specials. The network was rebranded as JUCE TV on January 1, 2014.

On June 1, 2015, JUCE TV was combined into a single subchannel with sister network Smile of a Child TV (which targets a younger audience, children between the ages of 2 and 12). Under this arrangement, the latter network began occupying nine hours of programming daily (from 6:00 a.m. to 3:00 p.m. local time) over the third digital subchannel occupied by JUCE on the 38 stations TBN either owns directly or through its Community Educational Television subsidiary. One week later on June 8, TBN modified the timeshare arrangement, giving Smile of a Child and JUCE each a daily 12-hour window on the .3 subchannel, with JUCE now airing over the space from 7:00 p.m. to 7:00 a.m. in each time zone and Smile of a Child airing for the remainder of the day.

The change, which was the result of technical limitations with its stations' existing digital compression equipment, was a byproduct of the launch of TBN Salsa, a digital subchannel network targeting English-speaking Latinos which launched on that date. JUCE TV continued to maintain a 24-hour-day schedule, however, with all programming not shown over-the-air during Smile's programming hours over the subchannel space remaining available via live stream online through TBN's website and various mobile and digital media players.

On January 1, 2020, TBN resumed offering a 24-hour feed of JUCE over the DT5 subchannel of its owned-and-operated stations, replacing a temporary standard definition feed of TBN carried on the subchannel after TBN Salsa migrated exclusively to being a cable-exclusive network in May 2019. On January 26, 2020, JUCE was discontinued as a broadcast television service, being replaced by the new film-oriented network Positiv. JUCE continues to be used as a digital brand for content targeting the youth demographic.

== Programming ==
=== Network format ===
The format of the network under the JCTV and JUCE TV identities combined music videos, video jockeys, promotion of special Christian rock events, and news and documentaries about Christian bands and performers in an effort to establish popularity among Christian youth. The network also broadcast some extreme sports programs that document extreme sports athletes and how their faith impacts their lives. In addition to music-based and action sports programming, JUCE TV also aired other programming such as the discussion program Ask God, the game show Virtual Memory with Jamie Alexander, the ministry program Encounter TV with David Diga Hernandez and the religious sitcom Peculiar. It also aired movies with religious or inspirational themes, typically on Friday and Sunday evenings, and Saturday afternoons. Until 2014, JCTV aired "sneak preview" blocks of its programming on TBN on Friday and Saturday late nights.

From February 2013 to February 2015, the network also ran a week-long, semi-annual fundraising event called "Project JCTV" (later renamed "Project JUCE"); the event features a mix of entertainment and religious-based programs regularly seen on the network's schedule (some organized by program genre in the form of theme days), movies as well as a live three-hour telethon-style program that airs in both during the afternoon and in primetime each day during the "Project JCTV/Project JUCE" event (telecasts of regular programming during the event, including movies, are occasionally interrupted by interstitial segments to encourage viewers to make monetary pledges).

== See also ==
- Christian culture
- Smile (TV network)
