= Positiv =

American Christian television network, 2020-present

- Country: United States
- Broadcast area: Nationwide
- Headquarters: Tustin, California

Programming
- Language: English
- Picture format: 480i SDTV
- Timeshift service: Positiv East; Positiv West

Ownership
- Owner: Trinity Broadcasting Network

History
- Launched: January 26, 2020; 6 years ago
- Replaced: JUCE TV

Links
- Website: www.positiv.tv

Availability

Terrestrial
- Available on full-power and some low-power stations in most markets: x.5 on most TBN owned-and-operated stations and affiliates; check local listings for stations

Positiv is an American Christian television network owned and operated by the Trinity Broadcasting Network. It mainly consists of a lineup of Christian films, varying between smaller independent studio productions and major Hollywood studio productions, as well as some secular, family-friendly films from major film studios.

Positiv is carried over-the-air on digital subchannels of TBN owned-and-operated and affiliated stations nationwide, usually on that station's fifth subchannel. Positiv is also available on pay television providers as well as on select digital streaming platforms like Apple TV, Roku, and Amazon Fire TV that offer TBN's six American networks. Positiv is also available worldwide, like in Australia on FaithStream TV.

== History ==
Positiv launched on January 26, 2020, replacing JUCE TV in its channel allotments.
