= Maximum Bob (novel) =

1991 crime fiction novel by Elmore Leonard

- Author: Elmore Leonard
- Publisher: Delacorte Press
- ISBN: 978-0-385-30456-6

Maximum Bob is a 1991 crime fiction novel by Elmore Leonard. It was Leonard's 29th novel published under his own name. The novel was adapted for a television series in 1998.
