= Trinity Broadcasting Network =

International Christian television network (1973–present)

- Type: Religious broadcast television network
- Country: United States
- Broadcast area: Worldwide
- Affiliates: See list of affiliates
- Headquarters: Tustin, California

Programming
- Language: English
- Picture format: 720p/1080i HDTV; (broadcast affiliates exclusively transmit TBN programming in SD)

Ownership
- Owner: Trinity Broadcasting of Texas, Inc. (a non-profit church corporation)
- Key people: Matt Crouch (president)

History
- Launched: 1973 (53 years ago)
- Founder: Paul and Jan Crouch
- Former names: Trinity Broadcasting Systems (1973-1982)

Links
- Website: www.tbn.org

Availability

Terrestrial
- Digital terrestrial television (United States): x.1 on TBN stations, listings may vary

Streaming media
- Digital media receiver: Roku
- Digital media receiver: Apple TV
- Digital media receiver: Amazon Fire TV
- TBN+: Watch live (Free account required)

The Trinity Broadcasting Network (TBN; legally Trinity Broadcasting of Texas, Inc.) is an international Christian-based broadcast television network and the world's largest religious television network. TBN solicits donations on its website as cash, vehicles, or legacies.

TBN was headquartered in Costa Mesa, California, until March 3, 2017, when it sold its office park, Trinity Christian City, retaining its studios in nearby Tustin. Auxiliary studio facilities are located in Irving, Hendersonville, Gadsden, Decatur, Miami and Orlando, Tulsa and New York City. TBN has characterized itself as broadcasting programs hosted by a diverse group of ministries from Evangelical, traditional Protestant and Catholic denominations, non-profit charities, Messianic Jewish and other Christian media personalities. TBN also broadcasts original programming, faith-based films, and political opinion commentary from various distributors. The TBN corporation owns three broadcast networks in the United States—TBN, TBN Inspire, & Positiv—and operates four broadcast networks in the United States—TBN, TBN Inspire, Positiv and Enlace TBN—as well as a number of religious networks in other countries. Matt Crouch has been TBN's president and head of operations since 2015.

== History ==
The Trinity Broadcasting Network was co-founded as the Trinity Broadcasting Systems in 1973 by Paul Crouch, an Assemblies of God minister, and his spouse Jan Crouch. TBN began its broadcasting activities by renting time on the independent station KBSA (now UniMás owned-and-operated station KFTR-DT) in Ontario, California. After that station was sold, he began buying two hours a day of programming time on KLXA-TV in Fontana, California, in early 1974. That station was put up for sale shortly afterward. Paul Crouch then placed a bid to buy the station for $1 million and raised $100,000 for a down payment. After many struggles, the Crouches managed to raise the down payment and took over the station outright, with the station becoming KTBN-TV in 1977 and its city of license being reassigned to TBN's original homebase, Santa Ana, in 1983.

Initially, the station ran Christian programs for about six hours a day, expanding its programming to 12 hours a day by 1975, and began selling time to other Christian organizations to supplement its local programming. The station eventually instituted a 24-hour schedule in 1978.

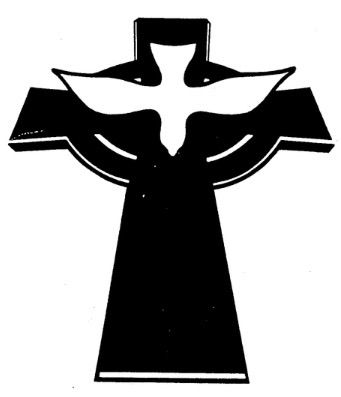
TBN logo used from 1982 to 1992

The fledgling network was so weak in its first days, that, according to Crouch in his autobiography, Hello World!, it almost went bankrupt after just two days on the air. TBN began national distribution through cable television providers in 1978. The ministry, which became known as the Trinity Broadcasting Network, gained national distribution via communications satellite in 1982. The network was a member of the National Religious Broadcasters association until 1990.

In 1977, the ministry purchased KPAZ-TV in Phoenix, Arizona, becoming its second television station property. During the 1980s and 1990s, TBN purchased additional independent television stations and signed on new stations around the United States; the purchase of the existing stations was done in order to gain cable carriage, due to the Federal Communications Commission (FCC)'s must-carry rules. TBN's availability eventually expanded to 95% of American households by early 2005.

== Broadcast outlets ==
TBN owns 35 full-power television stations serving larger metropolitan areas in the United States; at its peak, the network also owned 252 low-power television stations, which are mixed among stations serving medium-sized cities and rural translator stations in order to maximize the network's reach as much as is permissible. TBN also has several hundred affiliate stations throughout the United States, although just 61 of these are full-power UHF or VHF stations; the rest are low-powered stations, requiring a viewer to be within several miles of the transmitter to receive the signal. According to TVNewsCheck, TBN was the third largest over-the-air television station group in the country as of 2010, besting the station groups of CBS, Fox and NBC, but behind Ion Media Networks and Univision.

Many of TBN's stations are owned by the ministry outright, while others are owned through the subsidiary Community Educational Television, in order to own stations that TBN cannot acquire directly due to FCC ownership limits (which restrict companies from owning stations with a combined market reach of 39% of the United States), or are allocated for educational use and require additional programming to comply with that license purpose. TBN's programming is available by default via a national feed distributed to cable and satellite providers in markets without a local TBN station (this contrasts with the major commercial networks, which under FCC regulations, allow providers to import an owned-and-operated or affiliate station from a nearby market if no local over-the-air affiliate exists).

Worldwide, TBN's channels are broadcast on 70 satellites and over 18,000 television and cable affiliates. The TBN networks are also streamed live on the internet globally; the network also provides select archived shows on demand, through the website and select IPTV services.

During 2010, citing economic problems and a lack of donations, TBN closed down and sold many of its low-powered television repeaters. Of those, 17 were sold to another Christian television network, Daystar. On April 13, 2012, TBN sold 36 of its translators to Regal Media, a broadcasting group headed by George Cooney, the CEO of EUE/Screen Gems.

Another 151 translators were donated to the Minority Media and Television Council (MMTC), an organization designed to preserve equal opportunity and civil rights in the media; MMTC would later sell 78 of these translators to Luken Communications, parent company of the Retro Television Network. Four more translators in Dothan, Alabama; Kirksville, Missouri; Jonesboro, Arkansas; and Jackson, Tennessee, were sold by MMTC to New Moon Communications, with the intent to convert them into NBC affiliates. However, in September 2012, New Moon put all four of these translators for sale. Only Gray Television would purchase a transmitter in Dothan, which was converted into NBC affiliate WRGX-LD; the licenses in Ottumwa (KUMK-LP) and Jackson (WZMC-LP) would later be canceled (the NBC affiliate in Jackson, WNBJ-LD, operates using a different license). Its Jonesboro transmitter, KJNE-LP remained silent but with an active license; however, that market's ABC affiliate KAIT ended up obtaining the NBC affiliation instead, via a subchannel. KJNE-LP ended up becoming a translator station of Fox affiliate KJNB-LD. Another 44 of the licenses that were donated by TBN to the MMTC would be canceled on December 1, 2011, due to remaining silent for over a year.

On October 22, 2012, TBN acquired WRBJ-TV in Jackson, Mississippi from Roberts Broadcasting. Following FCC and bankruptcy court approval on January 17, 2013, TBN officially took over operational control of WRBJ on May 24, 2013, dropping all secular and CW network programming and converting it into a full-time satellite of TBN (the network was previously available in the Jackson area on WJKO-LP, which was later sold to Daystar).

On July 8, 2013, TBN announced an affiliation with the Lethbridge, Alberta, Canada religious station Miracle Channel; as part of the agreement, Miracle Channel added some of TBN's flagship programs, including Praise The Lord and Behind The Scenes, while TBN picked up programs shown on Miracle Channel, including services from the Springs Church (of which Miracle Channel CEO Leon Fontaine is a pastor), and The Leon Show on The Church Channel. Plans were also announced for Fontaine to become a regular host on Praise the Lord and four episodes per-year to originate from Canada, and for Miracle Channel and TBN co-produce a new weekly program.

In December 2023, TBN announced a distribution partnership with Phil McGraw's new venture Merit TV. TBN entered into a joint venture with McGraw hold a controlling equity stake in its parent company Merit Street Media, in exchange for distribution and access to production resources. In July 2025, Merit Street Media filed for Chapter 11 bankruptcy and sued TBN, accusing the company of reneging on its commitments and "[abusing] its power as a controlling shareholder to advance its own interests and those of its CEO Matthew Crouch".

=== Digital television ===
The signals of TBN's television stations are multiplexed into digital subchannels, most of which carry networks owned by TBN. Subchannel lineups vary, but as of January 2025, most stations use the one below.

- x.1: TBN – flagship network
- x.2: Merit TV – news discussion, talk shows, and true crime; joint venture with Phil McGraw
- x.3: TBN Inspire – programming similar to TBN's, but focused more on church services
- x.4: OnTV4U – paid programming
- x.5: Positiv – Christian and family-friendly films; network owned by TBN

A small number of stations broadcast TBN's Spanish-language Enlace network.

== Programming ==
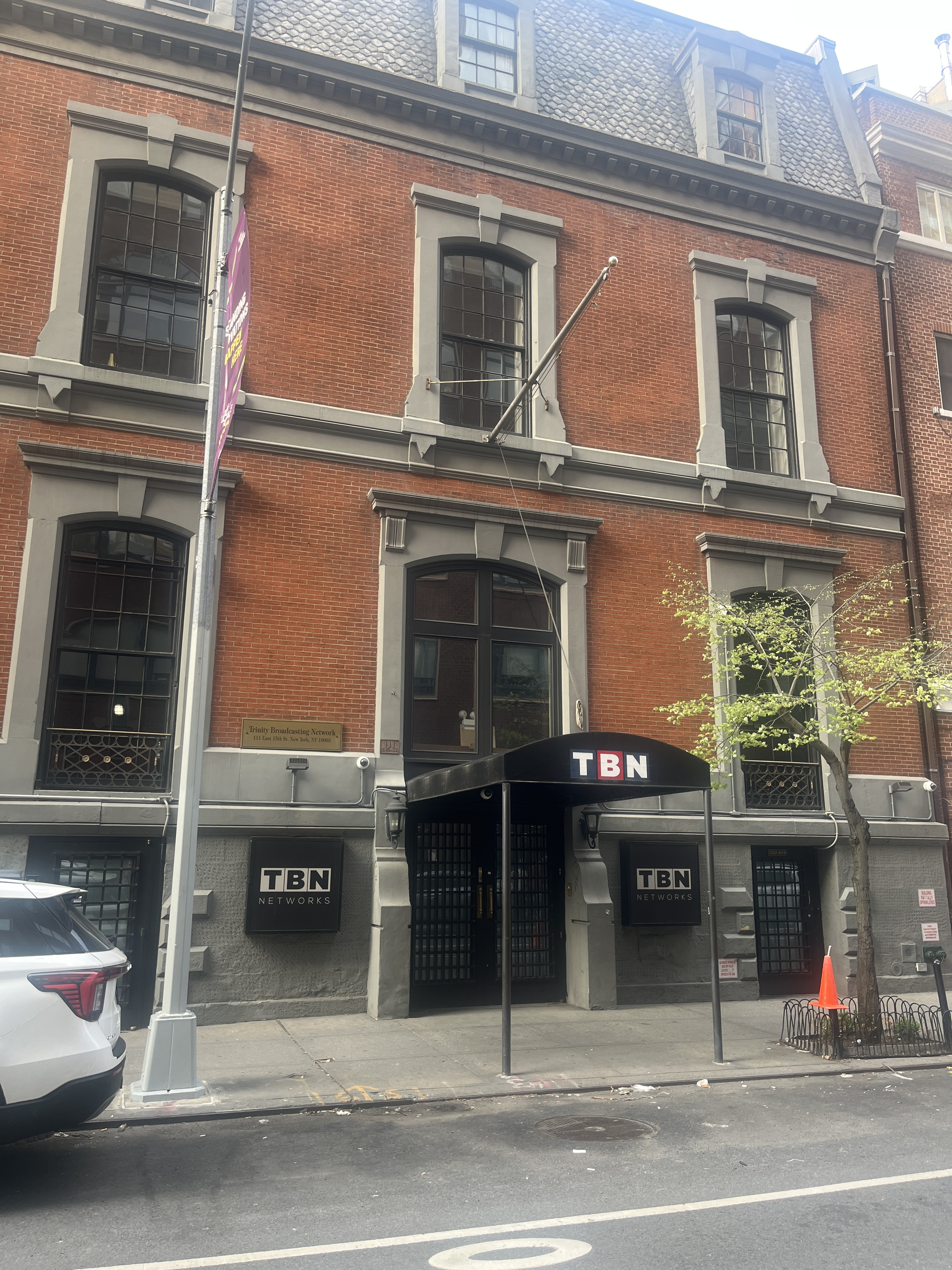
TBN's New York City production facility

=== Overview ===
TBN produces a variety of original Christian programs, such as gospel music concerts, live coverage of major Christian events, talk shows, health/fitness/nutrition programs with Christian family doctors, children's programs, contemporary Christian music videos, marriage enrichment series, holiday specials, Christian dramas, and full-length, family-oriented movies. In addition, the network airs local religious programming on each of their feeds.

The network's flagship program Praise is hosted by various regular and guest hosts, including TBN president Matt Crouch and his wife Laurie Crouch. It features interviews with celebrities, ministers, and laypeople discussing faith-based topics and their personal relationship with God; as well as musical performances from gospel and contemporary Christian artists. The program originated as Praise the Lord, was regularly hosted by TBN founders Paul and Jan Crouch, and was originally two or three hours long. Until 2017, local versions of Praise the Lord were produced by TBN owned-and-operated stations and affiliates in order to fulfill public affairs content guidelines.

==== Children's programming ====
TBN broadcasts VeggieTales under the "Smile" banner on Saturdays 8–10 a.m Eastern Time to fulfill E/I programming requirements as per the FCC's Children's Television Act. Programs previously featured as part of the lineup, and the defunct Smile spin-off network, ranged from contemporary programs (such as 3-2-1 Penguins!), classic series (such as Davey and Goliath), and TBN originals (such as iShine Knect and Mary Rice Hopkins & Puppets with a Heart).

==== Regularly scheduled shows ====
- Classic Billy Graham Crusades
- Changing Your Life with Gregory Dickow
- Changing Your World with Creflo A. Dollar
- Destined to Reign with Joseph Prince
- End of the Age with Irvin Baxter, Jr.
- Equip and Empower with Christine Caine
- Enjoying Everyday Life with Joyce Meyer
- Gospel Truth with Andrew Wommack
- Grace with Max Lucado
- Harvest with Greg Laurie
- Hour of Power
- In Touch with Dr. Charles Stanley
- Joel Osteen Ministries
- John Hagee Today
- Kingdom Connection with Jentezen Franklin
- Leading the Way with Michael Youssef
- Life Today with James Robison
- Living Proof with Beth Moore
- Manna-Fest with Perry Stone
- The Potter's Touch with Bishop T. D. Jakes
- Power Point with Jack Graham
- Praise (flagship program; various hosts)
- The 700 Club (hosted by Gordon P. Robertson)
- Touching Lives with Dr. James Merritt
- Turning Point with David Jeremiah
- Winning Walk with Ed Young Sr.

==== Personalities featured on TBN ====
- Steven Furtick
- Mike Huckabee

==== Movies ====
Since 2009, TBN has broadcast feature-length religious or inspirational-themed films; these films air primarily on weekend evenings (with films based on biblical stories most commonly airing on Sundays), with more contemporary films (which often incorporate moral lessons, faith-based lessons or a combination thereof, and are commonly targeted at youth audiences) airing on Saturday nights as part of the network's "preview" block of JUCE TV programs and intermittently on Monday–Fridays during the late-afternoon and overnight hours.

Films produced by or for TBN have included The Revolutionary and The Revolutionary II (based on the life of Jesus); The Emissary (a film on the life of the apostle Paul); The Omega Code and its sequel Megiddo: The Omega Code 2; Carman: The Champion; Time Changer; and Six: The Mark Unleashed (starring Stephen Baldwin and David A.R. White). Some of these films were produced by Gener8Xion Entertainment, TBN's Hollywood, California-based Christian motion picture studio, which was co-founded by Matt and Laurie Crouch.

TBN also broadcasts films from other production companies on its main network and some of its sister networks (in particular, JUCE TV and Smile of a Child). One notable film was Mel Gibson's The Passion of the Christ, which premiered on television on TBN on April 17, 2011. TBN presented the film with much of the graphic violence included (due to its depiction of the events leading to and including the crucifixion of Jesus Christ as illustrated in Biblical teachings); as a result, TBN assigned a "TV-MA-V" rating for the film, a rarity for many Christian networks.

== TBN HD ==
On December 15, 2009, the Trinity Broadcasting Network became the first Christian television network to broadcast completely in high definition. However, until 2018 only the national cable-satellite feed was transmitted in HD; TBN's owned-and-operated broadcast stations were not equipped to allow HD broadcasts due partly to the bandwidth limitations caused by its mandatory carriage of five subchannels over a single broadcast signal and the lack of a modern multiplexer at the transmitter level, disallowing TBN's master control from sending the main feed in high definition or widescreen standard definition (this is in comparison to Ion Media Networks, which carries five to six multiplex services on most of its stations – including its flagship network Ion Television, which is transmitted in high-definition); the primary TBN network feed is transmitted in standard-definition by its owned-and-operated stations and affiliates. Thus, widescreen programming on TBN's broadcast services was offered over-the-air in a letterboxed 4:3 picture format, though it is offered in native formats on pay television and IPTV services (including TBN's mobile and digital media player apps, the latter requiring email authentication and an opt-in to the network's mailing list as of June 2018). At some point in 2018, some TBN over-the-air stations upgraded their primary feed and second subchannel to 720p HD, where available and/or technically possible.

== Charitable and humanitarian initiatives ==
=== Smile of a Child Foundation ===
The Smile of a Child Foundation is a compassion-focused ministry, founded in 2005 by TBN co-founder Jan Crouch initially as a vehicle to reach the children of Haiti, providing food, medical care, toys and disaster relief to people in need. Crouch has over 20 years of personal involvement with the island country, having established a children's hospital, an orphanage and a school in Haiti. TBN spent millions in donations and other funding on these humanitarian projects.

Following the January 12, 2010, Haiti earthquake, TBN made immediate contributions of $100,000 through Lake Charles, Louisiana-based Friend Ships, which speeds emergency relief aid and medical expertise all over the world in its fleet of dedicated cargo/ministry ships. Friend Ships has been partnering with TBN and Smile since 1992; Paul Crouch personally donated a Bell 206 Jet Ranger helicopter to the humanitarian organization.

In May 2009, the United Nations officially recommended the Smile of a Child Foundation to receive special consultative status with the Economic and Social Council for the Democracy Coalition Project.

== Attractions ==
=== Trinity Music City ===
Trinity Music City is an entertainment complex in Hendersonville, Tennessee; near Nashville, operated by TBN and serving as the studios for TBN's Nashville-area station, WPGD-TV. Formerly known as "Twitty City", the former estate of country music legend Conway Twitty, the complex includes the 2,000-seat Trinity Music City Church Auditorium, which is used for TBN-produced concerts, dramas, seminars and special events. A 50-seat virtual reality theater showcases four original productions from TBN Films.

=== Trinity Christian City International ===
Trinity Christian City International was a complex in Costa Mesa, California, which served as the headquarters for TBN as well as a tourist attraction. On March 3, 2017, it was announced by The Christian media network that Trinity Christian City International had been sold to Greenlaw Partners, because TBN now finds its campus "obsolete". A sales price was not disclosed. On April 12, 2017, it was revealed that the sales price was $18.25 million.

=== Holy Land Experience ===
In June 2007, TBN purchased the bible-themed adventure park Holy Land Experience in Orlando, Florida, for $37 million.

== Criticisms and incidents ==
=== Theology ===
The Trinity Broadcasting Network had previously come under heavy criticism for its promotion of the prosperity gospel, teaching viewers that they will receive a reward if they donate or give offerings. In a 2004 interview with the Los Angeles Times, Paul Crouch, Jr. expressed his disappointment that "the prosperity gospel is a lightning rod for the Body of Christ. It's not what drives TBN." Under leadership of Matt Crouch, TBN no longer adheres to or practices that theology, and programming changes such as removing Kenneth Copeland reflect that shift.

TBN has always broadcast programming featuring Protestant pastors who do not promote the prosperity gospel, such as Charles Stanley, Jack Graham, Franklin Graham, Billy Graham, Michael Youssef, David Jeremiah and Robert Jeffress.

Scholar Steve Snow states that TBN "regularly promotes the teachings of the New Apostolic Reformation", which he argues "represents what Richard Hofstadter referred to as the modern paranoid style in American politics".

=== Wealth and transparency ===
TBN is a 501(c)(3) non-profit company. Full disclosure of TBN's financial statements have been evaluated by Charity Navigator, the largest evaluator of charities and non-profit companies in the U.S. TBN has received a three out of four star rating for four consecutive years, and in 2009 earned a rating of two out of four stars due to a 2% increase in administrative costs in 2009; the report also revealed that for the fiscal year ending December 2009, TBN president Paul Crouch, Sr. earned $419,500; co-vice president Jan Crouch earned $361,000; and co-vice president Paul Crouch, Jr. earned $214,137. TBN is currently under Donor Advisory status with Charity Navigator.

Another charity watchdog group, Ministry Watch, gave TBN an "F" in 2011 for its failure to provide financial statements, lack of timeliness in responding to correspondence, and its lack of clarity in the provided information. As a result, TBN was placed on the group's alert list annually since 2009.

TBN's annual financial information is monitored by the Chronicle of Philanthropy, where it is ranked 243 out of the top 400 non-profit corporations in the United States. TBN is not a member of the Evangelical Council for Financial Accountability.

In 2011, Paul Crouch, Jr. resigned from his position as co-vice president on TBN. On November 10 of that year, Crouch, Jr. joined The Word Network as its Director of Project Development.

In February 2012, Brittany Koper, TBN's former Director of Finance (and the daughter of Paul Crouch Jr.), filed a lawsuit against her former attorneys, Davert & Loe. The three counts of the complaint were for breach of fiduciary duties, intentional infliction of emotional distress, and professional negligence. In this lawsuit, Koper alleged that TBN unlawfully distributed over $50 million to the ministry's directors. Koper filed the suit following the termination of her employment with TBN. Davert & Loe, who also represented TBN, denied her claims. Koper's suit against Davert & Loe is pending; no official judicial ruling has been made in this matter. In a May 2012 interview with The New York Times, Koper claimed, "My job as finance director was to find ways to label extravagant personal spending as ministry expenses." Koper alleged that the network had herself and chauffeurs and sound engineers ordained as ministers in order to avoid paying Social Security taxes on their salaries. Brittany Koper said in a 2015 lawsuit that she was threatened with a firearm and dismissed on refusing to illegally transfer US$100 million of charitable assets to TBN directors' personal accounts.

=== Lawsuits ===
In September 2004, the Los Angeles Times reported that Paul Crouch had paid former TBN employee Enoch Lonnie Ford a $425,000 formal settlement to end a wrongful termination lawsuit in 1998. Ford alleged that he and Crouch had a homosexual tryst during his employment with the ministry. TBN officials acknowledged the settlement but contested Ford's credibility, noting that he had previously been convicted for child molestation and drug abuse. In 1996, Ford was fired by TBN after he was arrested for drug-related offenses and returned to prison for a year. Ford allegedly threatened to sue TBN for wrongful termination and sexual harassment after the network refused to hire him following his release, resulting in his claims against Crouch. TBN officials stated that the settlement was made in order to avoid a lengthy and expensive lawsuit.

In late 2003, Ford attempted to extort Crouch, threatening to release an autobiographical manuscript of their alleged affair if TBN did not purchase the document for $10 million. In October 2004, Judge Robert J. O'Neill awarded Crouch $136,000 in legal fees to be paid by Ford for his violation of the terms of the settlement agreement, specifically the prohibition of discussing the details of the settlement. On March 15, 2005, Ford appeared on the PAX TV reality series Lie Detector to be given a polygraph test; the results of the test were never broadcast or made public.

In June 2012, the Orange County Register reported that Carra Crouch, a granddaughter of Paul and Jan Crouch, alleged in a lawsuit that she had been raped by a TBN employee when she was 13 years old. Carra claimed to have been sexually abused while staying at an Atlanta hotel during TBN's "Spring Praise-a-Thon" in 2006. She also claimed that Jan Crouch and TBN attorney John Casoria blamed her for the incident, yet agreed not to turn the fired employee in to authorities if he did not file for unemployment, worker's comp or EEOC benefits. TBN attorney Colby May "vehemently denied" Carra's claims. In 2017, a year after Jan Crouch's death, a jury awarded Carra $2 million in damages for "mental suffering", but found that Jan had not been acting as a "Trinity Clergy Member" and therefore wasn't legally required to report the assault.

=== Pre-emption of programs due to criticism of other religions ===
Bible prophecy scholar Hal Lindsey's program International Intelligence Briefing, which occasionally aired commentary segments criticizing Muslims and Islam, aired on TBN from 1994 to 2005. In December 2005, TBN pre-empted the program for the entire month. Lindsey accused the network of censorship, saying, "some at the network apparently feel that my message is too pro-Israel and too anti-Muslim." Paul Crouch issued a press release stating that the show was only pre-empted for Christmas programming, but eventually admitted that TBN management was concerned that Lindsey "placed Arabs in a negative light." Lindsey resigned from TBN on January 1, 2006, effectively canceling International Intelligence Briefing. However, one year later, Crouch and Lindsey reconciled and a new program, The Hal Lindsey Report, premiered on the network.

In June 2011, TBN refused to rebroadcast an episode of Jack Van Impe's weekly program Jack Van Impe Presents, in which the evangelist criticized pastors Rick Warren and Robert Schuller for participating in interfaith conferences alongside Muslim leaders. Both Warren and Schuller denied the accusations. Paul Crouch defended TBN's decision, stating that it was against network policy for personalities to attack each other on-air (Schuller had a regular show on TBN). As a result, Jack Van Impe Ministries announced that it would no longer air Van Impe's program on TBN.

=== Travel the Road in Afghanistan ===
TBN produces and airs the Christian reality show Travel the Road, which features missionaries Tim Scott and Will Decker in remote and often war-torn locations. In December 2008, the program attracted criticism from the Military Religious Freedom Foundation (MRFF), a watchdog group that looks for religious discrimination in the United States military, which claimed that Scott and Decker were embedded with U.S. troops stationed in Afghanistan. According to MRFF president Mikey Weinstein, the military exercises a "complete prohibition of the proselytizing of any religion, faith, or practice...You see [Scott and Decker] wearing American helmets. It is obvious they were completely embedded." When ABC News contacted the U.S. Army in Afghanistan about Scott and Decker's alleged embed, which had taken place four years previously, they said that they no longer had the documentation of the missionaries' status with the troops.

Scott defended the trip to Afghanistan, telling ABC, "It wasn't like we were hiding in the back saying we're going to preach. [The military] knew what we were doing. We told them that we were born again Christians, we're here doing ministry, we shoot for this TV station and we want to embed and see what it was like. We were interviewing the chaplains and we talked to them. We spoke at the services and things like that. So we did do our mission being over there as far as being able to document what the soldiers go through, what it's like in Afghanistan. So I could say that we were on a secular mission as well as far as documenting. I would say we were news reporters as well, we were delivering news of what was actually happening there, but we were also there to document the Christian side." Scott argued that since the pair were acting as Christian journalists, they had the same right to cover the war in Afghanistan as secular networks.

== Awards and honors ==
- 2008: Parents Television Council Entertainment Seal of Approval

== See also ==
- Christian Broadcasting Network
- Daystar Television Network, another Christian television network which features many of the same programs
- Glorystar
- TBN Namibia
- Well to Hell hoax
