= Matt Crouch (broadcaster) =

American broadcaster and filmmaker (born 1961)

- Born: Matthew Wendell Crouch; October 26, 1961 (age 64); Muskegon, Michigan, US
- Occupations: TV network executive film producer/director TV host
- Employer: Trinity Broadcasting Network
- Title: President and chairman of TBN
- Spouse: Laurie Orndorff (m. 1985)
- Children: 2
- Parents: Paul Crouch; Jan Crouch
- Relatives: Paul Crouch Jr. (brother); Brandon Crouch (nephew); Brittany Koper (niece)
- Website: TBN.org

Matthew W. Crouch (born October 26, 1961) is an American broadcaster, on-air personality, and filmmaker. A second-generation television producer and executive, he is currently president of Trinity Broadcasting Network (TBN), and serves as the primary host (along with his wife Laurie) of the network's flagship program Praise.

== Personal life ==
The younger of Paul and Jan Crouch's two children, Matt was born in Muskegon, Michigan, where his parents worked as assistant pastors at a local Assemblies of God outpost. The family later moved to California, where his parents would co-found Trinity Broadcasting Network in 1973.

Crouch married Laurie Orndorff on August 25, 1985. They are the parents of two sons, Caylan and Cody.

== Career ==
Along with his older brother Paul Crouch Jr., Crouch spent his youth working behind the scenes at TBN in its early years. Crouch eventually rose to producing the network's flagship program, Praise The Lord, by the mid-1980s. Crouch later produced a Christian music video series, Real Videos, and a children's program, Kids' Club, for the network with his wife Laurie.

In 1995, Matt and Laurie Crouch co-founded Gener8Xion Entertainment, a Christian film studio based in Hollywood. Crouch was producer or executive producer for all of the studio's productions, such as The Omega Code (1999), Megiddo: The Omega Code 2 (2001), One Night with the King (2006), and Noëlle (2007). In 2009, Crouch co-directed the documentary feature The Cross: The Arthur Blessitt Story.

In 2010, Matt and Laurie Crouch resigned their positions at Gener8Xion Entertainment and sold their shares. Crouch subsequently joined TBN's staff full-time as a vice president, eventually becoming president in 2012, when his father Paul Sr. retired from the role. In addition to his role managing TBN's day-to-day operations, Crouch and Laurie also appear as hosts of Praise the Lord, TBN's signature nightly program.

In 2015, he became the president of Trinity Broadcasting Network.

In 2023, Crouch directed the documentary Route 60: The Biblical Highway, featuring David M. Friedman and Mike Pompeo.
