= List of television stations in the United States by call sign (initial letter W) =

This is a list of full-service television stations in the United States having call signs beginning the letter W. Stations licensed to transmit under low-power specifications—ex., WOCV-CD, W16DQ-D and WIFR-LD—have not been included. This also pertains to low-power licenses transmitting over the spectrum of a full-power license. (WBTS-CD transmits over full-power WGBX-TV's spectrum, but is excluded as it is classified as a low-power license).

See also the list of TV stations beginning with K and the list of TV stations beginning with C.

Station	City of license	Channel	Network(s)
WAAY-TV	Huntsville, Alabama	31	ABC
WABC-TV	New York, New York	7	ABC
WABE-TV	Atlanta, Georgia	30	PBS
WABG-TV	Greenwood, Mississippi	6	ABC
WABI-TV	Bangor, Maine	5	CBS
WABM	Birmingham, Alabama	68	MyNetworkTV
WABW-TV	Pelham, Georgia	14	PBS
WACH	Columbia, South Carolina	57	Fox
WACP	Atlantic City, New Jersey	4	TCT
WACS-TV	Dawson, Georgia	25	PBS
WACX	Leesburg, Florida	55	Religious
WACY-TV	Appleton, Wisconsin	32	Independent
WADL	Mount Clemens, Michigan	38	MyNetworkTV
WAFB	Baton Rouge, Louisiana	9	CBS
WAFF	Huntsville, Alabama	48	NBC
WAGA-TV	Atlanta, Georgia	5	Fox
WAGM-TV	Presque Isle, Maine	8	CBS
WAGV	Harlan, Kentucky	68	Religious
WAIQ	Montgomery, Alabama	26	PBS
WAKA	Selma, Alabama	8	CBS
WALA-TV	Mobile, Alabama	10	Fox
WALB	Albany, Georgia	10	NBC
WAMI-DT	Hollywood, Florida	69	UniMás
WAND	Decatur, Illinois	17	NBC
WANE-TV	Fort Wayne, Indiana	15	CBS
WANF	Atlanta, Georgia	46	Independent
WAOW	Wausau, Wisconsin	9	ABC
WAPA-TV	San Juan, Puerto Rico	4	Independent
WAPT	Jackson, Mississippi	16	ABC
WAQP	Saginaw, Michigan	49	TCT
WATC-DT	Atlanta, Georgia	57	Religious
WATE-TV	Knoxville, Tennessee	6	ABC
WATL	Atlanta, Georgia	36	MyNetworkTV
WATM-TV	Altoona, Pennsylvania	23	ABC
WATN-TV	Memphis, Tennessee	24	ABC
WAVE	Louisville, Kentucky	3	NBC
WAVY-TV	Portsmouth, Virginia	10	NBC
WAWD	Fort Walton Beach, Florida	58	Tourist Info
WAWV-TV	Terre Haute, Indiana	38	ABC
WAXN-TV	Kannapolis, North Carolina	64	Independent
WBAL-TV	Baltimore, Maryland	11	NBC
WBAY-TV	Green Bay, Wisconsin	2	ABC
WBBH-TV	Fort Myers, Florida	20	NBC
WBBJ-TV	Jackson, Tennessee	7	ABC
WBBM-TV	Chicago, Illinois	2	CBS
WBBZ-TV	Springville, New York	67	Independent/MeTV
WBDT	Springfield, Ohio	26	The CW
WBEC-TV	Boca Raton, Florida	63	Educational independent
WBFF	Baltimore, Maryland	45	Fox
WBFS-TV	Miami, Florida	33	Independent
WBGU-TV	Bowling Green, Ohio	27	PBS
WBIF	Marianna, Florida	51	Daystar
WBIH	Selma, Alabama	29	TCT
WBIQ	Birmingham, Alabama	10	PBS
WBIR-TV	Knoxville, Tennessee	10	NBC
WBKB-TV	Alpena, Michigan	11	CBS
WBKI	Salem, Indiana	58	The CW
WBKO	Bowling Green, Kentucky	13	ABC
WBKP	Calumet, Michigan	5	The CW
WBMM	Tuskegee, Alabama	22	The CW
WBNA	Louisville, Kentucky	21	Independent
WBNG-TV	Binghamton, New York	12	CBS
WBNS-TV	Columbus, Ohio	10	CBS
WBNX-TV	Akron, Ohio	55	Independent
WBOC-TV	Salisbury, Maryland	16	CBS
WBOY-TV	Clarksburg, West Virginia	12	NBC
WBPH-TV	Bethlehem, Pennsylvania	60	Religious
WBPX-TV	Boston, Massachusetts	68	Ion Television
WBRA-TV	Roanoke, Virginia	15	PBS
WBRC	Birmingham, Alabama	6	Fox
WBRE-TV	Wilkes-Barre, Pennsylvania	28	NBC
WBRZ-TV	Baton Rouge, Louisiana	2	ABC
WBSF	Bay City, Michigan	46	The CW
WBTV	Charlotte, North Carolina	3	CBS
WBTW	Florence, South Carolina	13	CBS
WBUI	Decatur, Illinois	23	The CW
WBUP	Ishpeming, Michigan	10	ABC
WBUY-TV	Holly Springs, Mississippi	40	TBN
WBXX-TV	Crossville, Tennessee	20	The CW
WBZ-TV	Boston, Massachusetts	4	CBS
WCAU	Philadelphia, Pennsylvania	10	NBC
WCAV	Charlottesville, Virginia	19	CBS
WCAX-TV	Burlington, Vermont	3	CBS
WCBB	Augusta, Maine	10	PBS
WCBD-TV	Charleston, South Carolina	2	NBC
WCBI-TV	Columbus, Mississippi	4	CBS
WCBS-TV	New York, New York	2	CBS
WCCB	Charlotte, North Carolina	18	The CW
WCCO-TV	Minneapolis, Minnesota	4	CBS
WCCT-TV	Waterbury, Connecticut	20	The CW
WCCU	Urbana, Illinois	27	Fox
WCCV-TV	Arecibo, Puerto Rico	54	Religious
WCES-TV	Wrens, Georgia	20	PBS
WCET	Cincinnati, Ohio	48	PBS
WCFE-TV	Plattsburgh, New York	57	PBS
WCHS-TV	Charleston, West Virginia	8	ABC
WCIA	Champaign, Illinois	3	CBS
WCIQ	Mount Cheaha, Alabama	7	PBS
WCIU-TV	Chicago, Illinois	26	The CW
WCIV	Charleston, South Carolina	36	MyNetworkTV
WCIX	Springfield, Illinois	49	MyNetworkTV
WCJB-TV	Gainesville, Florida	20	ABC
WCLF	Clearwater, Florida	22	CTN
WCLJ-TV	Bloomington, Indiana	42	Bounce TV
WCMH-TV	Columbus, Ohio	4	NBC
WCML	Alpena, Michigan	6	PBS
WCMU-TV	Mount Pleasant, Michigan	14	PBS
WCMV	Cadillac, Michigan	27	PBS
WCMW	Manistee, Michigan	21	PBS
WCNC-TV	Charlotte, North Carolina	36	NBC
WCNY-TV	Syracuse, New York	24	PBS
WCOV-TV	Montgomery, Alabama	20	Fox
WCPB	Salisbury, Maryland	28	PBS
WCPO-TV	Cincinnati, Ohio	9	ABC
WCPX-TV	Chicago, Illinois	38	Ion Television
WCSC-TV	Charleston, South Carolina	5	CBS
WCSH	Portland, Maine	6	NBC
WCTE	Cookeville, Tennessee	22	PBS
WCTI-TV	New Bern, North Carolina	12	ABC
WCTV	Thomasville, Georgia	6	CBS
WCTX	New Haven, Connecticut	59	MyNetworkTV
WCVB-TV	Boston, Massachusetts	5	ABC
WCVE-TV	Richmond, Virginia	23	PBS
WCVI-TV	Christiansted, U.S.V.I.	23	CBS/ABC
WCVN-TV	Covington, Kentucky	54	PBS
WCVW	Richmond, Virginia	57	PBS
WCWF	Suring, Wisconsin	14	The CW
WCWG	Lexington, North Carolina	20	The CW
WCWJ	Jacksonville, Florida	17	The CW
WCWN	Schenectady, New York	45	The CW
WCYB-TV	Bristol, Virginia	5	NBC
WDAF-TV	Kansas City, Missouri	4	Fox
WDAM-TV	Laurel, Mississippi	7	NBC
WDAY-TV	Fargo, North Dakota	6	ABC
WDAZ-TV	Devils Lake, North Dakota	8	ABC
WDBB	Bessemer, Alabama	17	The CW
WDBD	Jackson, Mississippi	40	Fox
WDBJ	Roanoke, Virginia	7	CBS
WDCA	Washington, D.C.	20	MyNetworkTV
WDCQ-TV	Bad Axe, Michigan	19	PBS
WDCW	Washington, D.C.	50	The CW
WDEF-TV	Chattanooga, Tennessee	12	CBS
WDFX-TV	Dothan, Alabama	34	Fox
WDHN	Dothan, Alabama	18	ABC
WDIO-DT	Duluth, Minnesota	10	ABC
WDIQ	Dozier, Alabama	2	PBS
WDIV-TV	Detroit, Michigan	4	NBC
WDJT-TV	Milwaukee, Wisconsin	58	CBS
WDKA	Paducah, Kentucky	49	MyNetworkTV
WDKY-TV	Danville, Kentucky	56	Fox
WDLI-TV	Canton, Ohio	17	Bounce TV
WDNI-CD	Indianapolis, Indiana	19	Telemundo
WDPB	Seaford, Delaware	64	PBS
WDPM-DT	Mobile, Alabama	18	Daystar
WDPN-TV	Wilmington, Delaware	2	MeTV
WDPX-TV	Woburn, Massachusetts	58	Grit
WDRB	Louisville, Kentucky	41	Fox
WDSC-TV	New Smyrna Beach, Florida	15	Educational independent
WDSE	Duluth, Minnesota	8	PBS
WDSI-TV	Chattanooga, Tennessee	61	True Crime Network
WDSU	New Orleans, Louisiana	6	NBC
WDTI	Indianapolis, Indiana	69	Daystar
WDTN	Dayton, Ohio	2	NBC
WDTV	Weston, West Virginia	5	CBS
WDVM-TV	Hagerstown, Maryland	25	Independent
WDWL	Bayamon, Puerto Rico	36	Enlace
WEAO	Akron, Ohio	49	PBS
WEAR-TV	Pensacola, Florida	3	ABC
WEAU	Eau Claire, Wisconsin	13	NBC
WEBA-TV	Allendale, South Carolina	14	PBS
WECN	Naranjito, Puerto Rico	64	Spanish Religious
WECT	Wilmington, North Carolina	6	NBC
WEDH	Hartford, Connecticut	24	PBS
WEDN	Norwich, Connecticut	53	PBS
WEDQ	Tampa, Florida	3	PBS
WEDU	Tampa, Florida	3	PBS
WEDW	Stamford, Connecticut	49	PBS
WEDY	New Haven, Connecticut	65	CPTV Spirit
WEEK-TV	Peoria, Illinois	25	NBC
WEFS	Cocoa, Florida	68	Educational independent
WEHT	Evansville, Indiana	25	ABC
WEIQ	Mobile, Alabama	42	PBS
WEIU-TV	Charleston, Illinois	51	PBS
WEKW-TV	Keene, New Hampshire	11	PBS
WELF-TV	Dalton, Georgia	23	TBN
WELU	Aguadilla, Puerto Rico	34	CTNi
WEMT	Greeneville, Tennessee	39	Fox
WENH-TV	Durham, New Hampshire	11	PBS
WENY-TV	Elmira, New York	36	ABC
WEPH	Tupelo, Mississippi	49	CTN
WEPX-TV	Greenville, North Carolina	38	Ion Television
WESH	Daytona Beach, Florida	2	NBC
WETA-TV	Washington, D.C.	26	PBS
WETK	Burlington, Vermont	33	PBS
WETM-TV	Elmira, New York	18	NBC
WETP-TV	Sneedville, Tennessee	2	PBS
WEUX	Chippewa Falls, Wisconsin	48	Fox
WEVV-TV	Evansville, Indiana	44	CBS
WEWS-TV	Cleveland, Ohio	5	ABC
WEYI-TV	Saginaw, Michigan	25	NBC
WFAA	Dallas, Texas	8	ABC
WFBD	Destin, Florida	48	TCT
WFDC-DT	Arlington, Virginia	14	Univision
WFFF-TV	Burlington, Vermont	44	Fox
WFFT-TV	Fort Wayne, Indiana	55	Fox
WFGC	Palm Beach, Florida	61	CTN
WFGX	Fort Walton Beach, Florida	35	MyNetworkTV
WFIE	Evansville, Indiana	14	NBC
WFIQ	Florence, Alabama	36	PBS
WFLA-TV	Tampa, Florida	8	NBC
WFLD	Chicago, Illinois	32	Fox
WFLI-TV	Cleveland, Tennessee	53	The CW
WFLX	West Palm Beach, Florida	29	Fox
WFMJ-TV	Youngstown, Ohio	21	NBC
WFMY-TV	Greensboro, North Carolina	2	CBS
WFMZ-TV	Allentown, Pennsylvania	69	Independent
WFNA	Gulf Shores, Alabama	55	The CW
WFOR-TV	Miami, Florida	4	CBS
WFOX-TV	Jacksonville, Florida	30	Fox
WFPT	Frederick, Maryland	62	PBS
WFPX-TV	Archer Lodge, North Carolina	62	Bounce TV
WFQX-TV	Cadillac, Michigan	32	Fox
WFRV-TV	Green Bay, Wisconsin	5	CBS
WFSB	Hartford, Connecticut	3	CBS
WFSG	Panama City, Florida	56	PBS
WFSU-TV	Tallahassee, Florida	11	PBS
WFTC	Minneapolis, Minnesota	29	MyNetworkTV
WFTS-TV	Tampa, Florida	28	ABC
WFTT-TV	Venice, Florida	62	María+Visión
WFTV	Orlando, Florida	9	ABC
WFTX-TV	Cape Coral, Florida	36	Fox
WFTY-DT	Smithtown, New York	67	True Crime Network
WFUP	Vanderbilt, Michigan	45	Fox
WFUT-DT	Newark, New Jersey	68	UniMás
WFWA	Fort Wayne, Indiana	39	PBS
WFXB	Myrtle Beach, South Carolina	43	Fox
WFXG	Augusta, Georgia	54	Fox
WFXL	Albany, Georgia	31	Fox
WFXP	Erie, Pennsylvania	66	Fox
WFXR	Roanoke, Virginia	27	Fox
WFXT	Boston, Massachusetts	25	Fox
WFXU	Live Oak, Florida	57	MeTV
WFXV	Utica, New York	33	Fox
WFXW	Greenville, Mississippi	15	TCT
WFYI	Indianapolis, Indiana	20	PBS
WGAL	Lancaster, Pennsylvania	8	NBC
WGBA-TV	Green Bay, Wisconsin	26	NBC
WGBC	Meridian, Mississippi	30	Fox
WGBH-TV	Boston, Massachusetts	2	PBS
WGBO-DT	Joliet, Illinois	66	Univision
WGBP-TV	Opelika, Alabama	66	Lx
WGBX-TV	Boston, Massachusetts	44	PBS
WGBY-TV	Springfield, Massachusetts	57	PBS
WGCU	Fort Myers, Florida	30	PBS
WGEM-TV	Quincy, Illinois	10	NBC
WGEN-TV	Key West, Florida	8	Estrella TV
WGFL	High Springs, Florida	28	CBS
WGGB-TV	Springfield, Massachusetts	40	ABC
WGGN-TV	Sandusky, Ohio	52	Religious/BizTV
WGGS-TV	Greenville, South Carolina	16	Religious
WGHP	High Point, North Carolina	8	Fox
WGIQ	Louisville, Alabama	43	PBS
WGMB-TV	Baton Rouge, Louisiana	44	Fox
WGME-TV	Portland, Maine	13	CBS
WGN-TV	Chicago, Illinois	9	Independent
WGNM	Macon, Georgia	45	CTN
WGNO	New Orleans, Louisiana	26	ABC
WGNT	Portsmouth, Virginia	27	The CW
WGPT	Oakland, Maryland	36	PBS
WGPX-TV	Burlington, North Carolina	16	Ion Television
WGRZ	Buffalo, New York	2	NBC
WGTA	Toccoa, Georgia	32	MeTV
WGTE-TV	Toledo, Ohio	30	PBS
WGTQ	Sault Ste. Marie, Michigan	8	ABC
WGTU	Traverse City, Michigan	29	ABC
WGTV	Athens, Georgia	8	PBS
WGTW-TV	Millville, New Jersey	48	TBN
WGVK	Kalamazoo, Michigan	52	PBS
WGVU-TV	Grand Rapids, Michigan	35	PBS
WGWG	Charleston, South Carolina	4	MeTV
WGWW	Anniston, Alabama	40	Heroes & Icons
WGXA	Macon, Georgia	24	Fox
WHA-TV	Madison, Wisconsin	21	PBS
WHAM-TV	Rochester, New York	13	ABC
WHAS-TV	Louisville, Kentucky	11	ABC
WHBF-TV	Rock Island, Illinois	4	CBS
WHBQ-TV	Memphis, Tennessee	13	Fox
WHBR	Pensacola, Florida	33	CTN
WHDF	Florence, Alabama	15	The CW
WHDH	Boston, Massachusetts	7	Independent
WHDT	Stuart, Florida	9	Florida News 24
WHEC-TV	Rochester, New York	10	NBC
WHFT-TV	Miami, Florida	45	TBN
WHIO-TV	Dayton, Ohio	7	CBS
WHIQ	Huntsville, Alabama	25	PBS
WHIZ-TV	Zanesville, Ohio	18	NBC
WHLA-TV	La Crosse, Wisconsin	31	PBS
WHLT	Hattiesburg, Mississippi	22	CBS
WHLV-TV	Cocoa, Florida	52	TBN
WHMB-TV	Indianapolis, Indiana	40	Univision
WHMC	Conway, South Carolina	23	PBS
WHME-TV	South Bend, Indiana	46	Univision
WHNO	New Orleans, Louisiana	20	CTN
WHNS	Asheville, North Carolina	21	Fox
WHNT-TV	Huntsville, Alabama	19	CBS
WHO-DT	Des Moines, Iowa	13	NBC
WHOI	Peoria, Illinois	19	MyNetworkTV
WHP-TV	Harrisburg, Pennsylvania	21	CBS
WHPX-TV	New London, Connecticut	26	Ion Television
WHRM-TV	Wausau, Wisconsin	20	PBS
WHRO-TV	Hampton-Norfolk, Virginia	15	PBS
WHSG-TV	Monroe, Georgia	63	TBN
WHSV-TV	Harrisonburg, Virginia	3	ABC
WHTJ	Charlottesville, Virginia	41	PBS
WHTM-TV	Harrisburg, Pennsylvania	27	ABC
WHTN	Murfreesboro, Tennessee	39	CTN
WHUT-TV	Washington, D.C.	32	PBS
WHWC-TV	Menomonie, Wisconsin	28	PBS
WHYY-TV	Wilmington, Delaware	12	PBS
WIAT	Birmingham, Alabama	42	CBS
WIBW-TV	Topeka, Kansas	13	CBS
WICD	Champaign, Illinois	15	ABC
WICS	Springfield, Illinois	20	ABC
WICU-TV	Erie, Pennsylvania	12	NBC
WICZ-TV	Binghamton, New York	40	Fox
WIDP	Guayama, Puerto Rico	46	Spanish Religious
WIFS	Janesville, Wisconsin	57	Ion Television
WIIQ	Demopolis, Alabama	41	PBS
WILL-TV	Urbana, Illinois	12	PBS
WILX-TV	Onondaga, Michigan	10	NBC
WINK-TV	Fort Myers, Florida	11	CBS
WINM	Angola, Indiana	12	TCT
WINP-TV	Pittsburgh, Pennsylvania	16	Ion Television
WIPB	Muncie, Indiana	49	PBS
WIPL	Lewiston, Maine	35	Ion Television
WIPM-TV	Mayagüez, Puerto Rico	3	PBS/Independent
WIPR-TV	San Juan, Puerto Rico	6	PBS/Independent
WIPX-TV	Bloomington, Indiana	63	Ion Television
WIRS	Yauco, Puerto Rico	42	SonLife
WIRT-DT	Hibbing, Minnesota	13	ABC
WIS	Columbia, South Carolina	10	NBC
WISC-TV	Madison, Wisconsin	3	CBS
WISE-TV	Fort Wayne, Indiana	33	The CW
WISH-TV	Indianapolis, Indiana	8	The CW
WISN-TV	Milwaukee, Wisconsin	12	ABC
WITF-TV	Harrisburg, Pennsylvania	33	PBS
WITI	Milwaukee, Wisconsin	6	Fox
WITN-TV	Washington, North Carolina	7	NBC
WITV	Charleston, South Carolina	7	PBS
WIVB-TV	Buffalo, New York	4	CBS
WIVT	Binghamton, New York	34	ABC
WIWN	Fond du Lac, Wisconsin	68	Cozi TV
WIYC	Troy, Alabama	48	Cozi TV
WJAC-TV	Johnstown, Pennsylvania	6	NBC
WJAL	Hagerstown, Maryland	68	NTD
WJAR	Providence, Rhode Island	10	NBC
WJAX-TV	Jacksonville, Florida	47	CBS
WJBF	Augusta, Georgia	6	ABC
WJBK	Detroit, Michigan	2	Fox
WJCL	Savannah, Georgia	22	ABC
WJCT	Jacksonville, Florida	7	PBS
WJEB-TV	Jacksonville, Florida	59	TBN
WJET-TV	Erie, Pennsylvania	24	ABC
WJFB	Lebanon, Tennessee	44	MeTV
WJFW-TV	Rhinelander, Wisconsin	12	NBC
WJHG-TV	Panama City, Florida	7	NBC
WJHL-TV	Johnson City, Tennessee	11	CBS
WJKT	Jackson, Tennessee	16	Fox
WJLA-TV	Washington, D.C.	7	ABC
WJLP	Middletown Township, New Jersey	33	MeTV
WJMN-TV	Escanaba, Michigan	3	ABC
WJPM-TV	Florence, South Carolina	33	PBS
WJPX	San Juan, Puerto Rico	24	ABC
WJRT-TV	Flint, Michigan	12	ABC
WJSP-TV	Columbus, Georgia	28	PBS
WJTC	Pensacola, Florida	44	Independent
WJTV	Jackson, Mississippi	12	CBS
WJW	Cleveland, Ohio	8	Fox
WJWJ-TV	Beaufort, South Carolina	16	PBS
WJWN-TV	San Sebastian, Puerto Rico	38	América TeVé
WJXT	Jacksonville, Florida	4	Independent
WJXX	Orange Park, Florida	25	ABC
WJYS	Hammond, Indiana	62	Independent
WJZ-TV	Baltimore, Maryland	13	CBS
WJZY	Belmont, North Carolina	46	Fox
WKAQ-TV	San Juan, Puerto Rico	2	Telemundo
WKAR-TV	East Lansing, Michigan	23	PBS
WKAS	Ashland, Kentucky	25	PBS
WKBD-TV	Detroit, Michigan	50	The CW
WKBN-TV	Youngstown, Ohio	27	CBS
WKBS-TV	Altoona, Pennsylvania	47	Cornerstone Television
WKBT-DT	La Crosse, Wisconsin	8	CBS
WKBW-TV	Buffalo, New York	7	ABC
WKCF	Clermont, Florida	18	The CW
WKEF	Dayton, Ohio	22	ABC
WKGB-TV	Bowling Green, Kentucky	53	PBS
WKHA	Hazard, Kentucky	35	PBS
WKLE	Lexington, Kentucky	46	PBS
WKMA-TV	Madisonville, Kentucky	35	PBS
WKMG-TV	Orlando, Florida	6	CBS
WKMJ-TV	Louisville, Kentucky	68	PBS Encore
WKMR	Morehead, Kentucky	38	PBS
WKMU	Murray, Kentucky	21	PBS
WKNO	Memphis, Tennessee	10	PBS
WKNX-TV	Knoxville, Tennessee	7	Independent
WKOH	Owensboro, Kentucky	31	PBS
WKOI-TV	Richmond, Indiana	43	Ion Television
WKON	Owenton, Kentucky	52	PBS
WKOP-TV	Knoxville, Tennessee	15	PBS
WKOW	Madison, Wisconsin	27	ABC
WKPC-TV	Louisville, Kentucky	15	PBS
WKPD	Paducah, Kentucky	29	PBS
WKPI-TV	Pikeville, Kentucky	22	PBS
WKPT-TV	Kingsport, Tennessee	19	Cozi TV
WKPV	Ponce, Puerto Rico	20	América Tevé
WKRC-TV	Cincinnati, Ohio	12	CBS
WKRG-TV	Mobile, Alabama	5	CBS
WKRN-TV	Nashville, Tennessee	2	ABC
WKSO-TV	Somerset, Kentucky	29	PBS
WKTC	Sumter, South Carolina	63	MyNetworkTV
WKTV	Utica, New York	2	NBC
WKYC	Cleveland, Ohio	3	NBC
WKYT-TV	Lexington, Kentucky	27	CBS
WKYU-TV	Bowling Green, Kentucky	24	PBS
WKZT-TV	Elizabethtown, Kentucky	23	PBS
WLAE-TV	New Orleans, Louisiana	32	Educational independent
WLAJ	Lansing, Michigan	53	ABC
WLAX	La Crosse, Wisconsin	25	Fox
WLBT	Jackson, Mississippi	3	NBC
WLBZ	Bangor, Maine	2	NBC
WLED-TV	Littleton, New Hampshire	11	PBS
WLEF-TV	Park Falls, Wisconsin	36	PBS
WLEX-TV	Lexington, Kentucky	18	NBC
WLFB	Bluefield, West Virginia	40	Religious
WLFG	Grundy, Virginia	68	Religious
WLFI-TV	Lafayette, Indiana	18	CBS
WLFL	Raleigh, North Carolina	22	The CW
WLII-DT	Caguas, Puerto Rico	11	Univision/Independent
WLIO	Lima, Ohio	8	NBC
WLIW	Garden City, New York	21	PBS
WLJC-TV	Beattyville, Kentucky	65	Cozi TV
WLJT	Lexington, Tennessee	11	PBS
WLKY	Louisville, Kentucky	32	CBS
WLLA	Kalamazoo, Michigan	64	Religious
WLMA	Lima, Ohio	44	Religious
WLMB	Toledo, Ohio	40	Religious
WLMT	Memphis, Tennessee	30	The CW
WLNE-TV	New Bedford, Massachusetts	6	ABC
WLNS-TV	Lansing, Michigan	6	CBS
WLNY-TV	Riverhead, New York	55	Independent
WLOO	Vicksburg, Mississippi	35	MyNetworkTV
WLOS	Asheville, North Carolina	13	ABC
WLOV-TV	West Point, Mississippi	27	Fox
WLOX	Biloxi, Mississippi	13	ABC
WLPB-TV	Baton Rouge, Louisiana	27	PBS
WLPX-TV	Charleston, West Virginia	29	Ion Television
WLRN-TV	Miami, Florida	17	PBS
WLS-TV	Chicago, Illinois	7	ABC
WLTV-DT	Miami, Florida	23	Univision
WLTX	Columbia, South Carolina	19	CBS
WLTZ	Columbus, Georgia	38	NBC
WLUC-TV	Marquette, Michigan	6	NBC
WLUK-TV	Green Bay, Wisconsin	11	Fox
WLVI	Cambridge, Massachusetts	56	The CW
WLVT-TV	Allentown, Pennsylvania	39	PBS
WLWC	New Bedford, Massachusetts	28	Court TV
WLWT	Cincinnati, Ohio	5	NBC
WLXI	Greensboro, North Carolina	43	TCT
WLYH	Red Lion, Pennsylvania	49	Independent
WMAB-TV	Mississippi State, Mississippi	2	PBS
WMAE-TV	Booneville, Mississippi	12	PBS
WMAH-TV	Biloxi, Mississippi	19	PBS
WMAO-TV	Greenwood, Mississippi	23	PBS
WMAQ-TV	Chicago, Illinois	5	NBC
WMAR-TV	Baltimore, Maryland	2	ABC
WMAU-TV	Bude, Mississippi	17	PBS
WMAV-TV	Oxford, Mississippi	18	PBS
WMAW-TV	Meridian, Mississippi	14	PBS
WMAZ-TV	Macon, Georgia	13	CBS
WMBB	Panama City, Florida	13	ABC
WMBC-TV	Newton, New Jersey	63	NTD
WMBD-TV	Peoria, Illinois	31	CBS
WMBF-TV	Myrtle Beach, South Carolina	32	NBC
WMC-TV	Memphis, Tennessee	5	NBC
WMCF-TV	Montgomery, Alabama	45	TBN
WMCN-TV	Princeton, New Jersey	44	ShopHQ
WMDE	Dover, Delaware	36	ShopHQ
WMDN	Meridian, Mississippi	24	CBS
WMDT	Salisbury, Maryland	47	ABC
WMEA-TV	Biddeford, Maine	26	PBS
WMEB-TV	Orono, Maine	12	PBS
WMEC	Macomb, Illinois	22	PBS
WMED-TV	Calais, Maine	13	PBS
WMEM-TV	Presque Isle, Maine	10	PBS
WMFD-TV	Mansfield, Ohio	68	Independent
WMFP	Foxborough, Massachusetts	62	Infomercials
WMGM-TV	Wildwood, New Jersey	40	True Crime Network
WMGT-TV	Macon, Georgia	41	NBC
WMHT	Schenectady, New York	17	PBS
WMLW-TV	Racine, Wisconsin	49	Independent
WMOR-TV	Lakeland, Florida	32	Independent
WMOW	Crandon, Wisconsin	4	Decades
WMPB	Baltimore, Maryland	67	PBS
WMPN-TV	Jackson, Mississippi	29	PBS
WMPT	Annapolis, Maryland	22	PBS
WMPV-TV	Mobile, Alabama	21	TBN
WMSN-TV	Madison, Wisconsin	47	Fox
WMTJ	Fajardo, Puerto Rico	40	PBS
WMTV	Madison, Wisconsin	15	NBC
WMTW	Poland Spring, Maine	8	ABC
WMUM-TV	Cochran, Georgia	29	PBS
WMUR-TV	Manchester, New Hampshire	9	ABC
WMVS	Milwaukee, Wisconsin	10	PBS
WMVT	Milwaukee, Wisconsin	36	PBS
WMWC-TV	Galesburg, Illinois	53	TBN
WMYA-TV	Greenville, South Carolina	40	Dabl
WMYD	Detroit, Michigan	20	Independent
WMYT-TV	Rock Hill, South Carolina	55	MyNetworkTV
WMYV	Greensboro, North Carolina	48	MyNetworkTV
WNAB	Nashville, Tennessee	58	Dabl
WNAC-TV	Providence, Rhode Island	64	Fox
WNBC	New York, New York	4	NBC
WNBW-DT	Gainesville, Florida	9	NBC
WNCF	Montgomery, Alabama	32	ABC
WNCN	Goldsboro, North Carolina	17	CBS
WNCT-TV	Greenville, North Carolina	9	CBS
WNDU-TV	South Bend, Indiana	16	NBC
WNDY-TV	Marion, Indiana	23	MyNetworkTV
WNED-TV	Buffalo, New York	17	PBS
WNEH	Greenwood, South Carolina	38	PBS
WNEM-TV	Bay City, Michigan	5	CBS
WNEO	Alliance, Ohio	45	PBS
WNEP-TV	Scranton, Pennsylvania	16	ABC
WNET	Newark, New Jersey	13	PBS
WNEU	Merrimack, New Hampshire	60	Telemundo
WNGH-TV	Chatsworth, Georgia	18	PBS
WNIN	Evansville, Indiana	9	PBS
WNIT	South Bend, Indiana	34	PBS
WNJB	New Brunswick, New Jersey	58	PBS
WNJN	Montclair, New Jersey	50	PBS
WNJS	Camden, New Jersey	23	PBS
WNJT	Trenton, New Jersey	52	PBS
WNJU	Linden, New Jersey	47	Telemundo
WNJX-TV	Mayagüez, Puerto Rico	4	Independent
WNKY	Bowling Green, Kentucky	40	NBC
WNLO	Buffalo, New York	23	The CW
WNMU	Marquette, Michigan	13	PBS
WNNE	Montpelier, Vermont	31	The CW
WNOL-TV	New Orleans, Louisiana	38	The CW
WNPB-TV	Morgantown, West Virginia	24	PBS
WNPI-DT	Norwood, New York	18	PBS
WNPT	Nashville, Tennessee	8	PBS
WNPX-TV	Cookeville, Tennessee	28	Ion Television
WNSC-TV	Rock Hill, South Carolina	30	PBS
WNTV	Greenville, South Carolina	29	PBS
WNTZ-TV	Natchez, Mississippi	48	MyNetworkTV/Fox
WNUV	Baltimore, Maryland	54	The CW
WNVC	Culpeper, Virginia	41	World Channel
WNVT	Spotsylvania, Virginia	23	World Channel
WNWO-TV	Toledo, Ohio	24	NBC
WNYA	Pittsfield, Massachusetts	51	MyNetworkTV
WNYB	Jamestown, New York	26	TCT
WNYE-TV	New York, New York	25	Educational independent
WNYI	Ithaca, New York	52	Daystar
WNYO-TV	Buffalo, New York	49	MyNetworkTV
WNYT	Albany, New York	13	NBC
WNYW	New York, New York	5	Fox
WOAI-TV	San Antonio, Texas	4	NBC
WOAY-TV	Oak Hill, West Virginia	4	ABC
WOFL	Orlando, Florida	35	Fox
WOGX	Ocala, Florida	51	Fox
WOI-DT	Ames, Iowa	5	ABC
WOIO	Shaker Heights, Ohio	19	CBS
WOLE-DT	Aguadilla, Puerto Rico	12	Univision
WOLF-TV	Hazleton, Pennsylvania	56	Fox
WOLO-TV	Columbia, South Carolina	25	ABC
WOOD-TV	Grand Rapids, Michigan	8	NBC
WOPX-TV	Melbourne, Florida	56	Ion Television
WORA-TV	Mayagüez, Puerto Rico	5	ABC
WORO-DT	San Juan, Puerto Rico	13	Religious
WOST	Mayagüez, Puerto Rico	14	ShopHQ
WOSU-TV	Columbus, Ohio	34	PBS
WOTF-TV	Daytona Beach, Florida	26	Grit
WOTV	Battle Creek, Michigan	41	ABC
WOUB-TV	Athens, Ohio	20	PBS
WOUC-TV	Cambridge, Ohio	44	PBS
WOWK-TV	Huntington, West Virginia	13	CBS
WOWT	Omaha, Nebraska	6	NBC
WPAN	Fort Walton Beach, Florida	53	Blab TV
WPBF	Tequesta, Florida	25	ABC
WPBN-TV	Traverse City, Michigan	7	NBC
WPBS-TV	Watertown, New York	16	PBS
WPBT	Miami, Florida	2	PBS
WPCB-TV	Greensburg, Pennsylvania	40	Cornerstone Television
WPCH-TV	Atlanta, Georgia	17	Independent
WPCT	Panama City Beach, Florida	46	Tourist Info
WPDE-TV	Florence, South Carolina	15	ABC
WPEC	West Palm Beach, Florida	12	CBS
WPFO	Waterville, Maine	23	Fox
WPGA-TV	Perry, Georgia	58	MeTV
WPGD-TV	Hendersonville, Tennessee	50	TBN
WPGH-TV	Pittsburgh, Pennsylvania	53	Fox
WPGX	Panama City, Florida	28	Fox
WPHL-TV	Philadelphia, Pennsylvania	17	MyNetworkTV
WPIX	New York, New York	11	The CW
WPKD-TV	Jeannette, Pennsylvania	19	The CW
WPLG	Miami, Florida	10	Independent
WPMI-TV	Mobile, Alabama	15	NBC
WPMT	York, Pennsylvania	43	Fox
WPNE-TV	Green Bay, Wisconsin	38	PBS
WPNT	Pittsburgh, Pennsylvania	22	MyNetworkTV
WPPT	Philadelphia, Pennsylvania	35	PBS Encore
WPPX-TV	Philadelphia, Pennsylvania	61	Ion Television
WPRI-TV	Providence, Rhode Island	12	CBS
WPSD-TV	Paducah, Kentucky	6	NBC
WPSG	Philadelphia, Pennsylvania	57	The CW
WPSU-TV	Clearfield, Pennsylvania	3	PBS
WPTA	Fort Wayne, Indiana	21	ABC
WPTD	Dayton, Ohio	16	PBS
WPTO	Oxford, Ohio	14	PBS
WPTV-TV	West Palm Beach, Florida	5	NBC
WPTZ	Plattsburgh, New York	5	NBC
WPVI-TV	Philadelphia, Pennsylvania	6	ABC
WPWR-TV	Gary, Indiana	50	MyNetworkTV
WPXA-TV	Rome, Georgia	14	Ion Television
WPXC-TV	Brunswick, Georgia	21	Ion Television
WPXD-TV	Ann Arbor, Michigan	31	Ion Television
WPXE-TV	Kenosha, Wisconsin	55	Ion Television
WPXG-TV	Concord, New Hampshire	21	Ion Television
WPXH-TV	Hoover, Alabama	44	Ion Television
WPXI	Pittsburgh, Pennsylvania	11	NBC
WPXJ-TV	Batavia, New York	51	Ion Television
WPXK-TV	Jellico, Tennessee	54	Ion Television
WPXL-TV	New Orleans, Louisiana	49	Ion Television
WPXM-TV	Miami, Florida	35	Ion Television
WPXN-TV	New York, New York	31	Ion Television
WPXP-TV	Lake Worth, Florida	67	Ion Television
WPXQ-TV	Newport, Rhode Island	69	Ion Television
WPXR-TV	Roanoke, Virginia	38	Ion Television
WPXS	Mount Vernon, Illinois	13	Daystar
WPXT	Portland, Maine	51	The CW
WPXU-TV	Jacksonville, North Carolina	35	Ion Television
WPXV-TV	Norfolk, Virginia	49	Ion Television
WPXW-TV	Manassas, Virginia	66	Ion Television
WPXX-TV	Memphis, Tennessee	50	Ion Television
WQAD-TV	Moline, Illinois	8	ABC
WQCW	Portsmouth, Ohio	30	The CW
WQEC	Quincy, Illinois	27	PBS
WQED	Pittsburgh, Pennsylvania	13	PBS
WQHA	Aguada, Puerto Rico	50	Religious
WQHS-DT	Cleveland, Ohio	61	Univision
WQLN	Erie, Pennsylvania	54	PBS
WQMY	Williamsport, Pennsylvania	53	MyNetworkTV
WQOW	Eau Claire, Wisconsin	18	ABC
WQPT-TV	Moline, Illinois	24	PBS
WQPX-TV	Scranton, Pennsylvania	64	Ion Television
WQRF-TV	Rockford, Illinois	39	Fox
WQTO	Ponce, Puerto Rico	26	PBS
WRAL-TV	Raleigh, North Carolina	5	NBC
WRAY-TV	Wake Forest, North Carolina	30	TCT
WRAZ	Raleigh, North Carolina	50	Fox
WRBJ-TV	Magee, Mississippi	34	TBN
WRBL	Columbus, Georgia	3	CBS
WRBU	St. Louis, Missouri	46	Ion Television
WRBW	Orlando, Florida	65	MyNetworkTV
WRC-TV	Washington, D.C.	4	NBC
WRCB	Chattanooga, Tennessee	3	NBC
WRDC	Durham, North Carolina	28	MyNetworkTV
WRDQ	Orlando, Florida	27	Independent
WRDW-TV	Augusta, Georgia	12	CBS
WREG-TV	Memphis, Tennessee	3	CBS
WRET-TV	Spartanburg, South Carolina	49	PBS
WREX	Rockford, Illinois	13	NBC
WRFB	Carolina, Puerto Rico	5	ABC
WRGB	Schenectady, New York	6	CBS
WRGT-TV	Dayton, Ohio	45	Dabl
WRIC-TV	Petersburg, Virginia	8	ABC
WRJA-TV	Sumter, South Carolina	27	PBS
WRLH-TV	Richmond, Virginia	35	Fox
WRLK-TV	Columbia, South Carolina	35	PBS
WRLM	Canton, Ohio	47	TCT
WRNN-TV	New Rochelle, New York	48	ShopHQ
WROC-TV	Rochester, New York	8	CBS
WRPT	Hibbing, Minnesota	31	PBS
WRPX-TV	Rocky Mount, North Carolina	47	Ion Television
WRSP-TV	Springfield, Illinois	55	Fox
WRTV	Indianapolis, Indiana	6	ABC
WRUA	Fajardo, Puerto Rico	34	Spanish Independent
WRXY-TV	Tice, Florida	49	CTN
WSAV-TV	Savannah, Georgia	3	NBC
WSAW-TV	Wausau, Wisconsin	7	CBS
WSAZ-TV	Huntington, West Virginia	3	NBC
WSB-TV	Atlanta, Georgia	2	ABC
WSBE-TV	Providence, Rhode Island	36	PBS
WSBK-TV	Boston, Massachusetts	38	Independent
WSBS-TV	Key West, Florida	22	Mega TV
WSBT-TV	South Bend, Indiana	22	CBS
WSCG	Baxley, Georgia	34	TCT
WSCV	Fort Lauderdale, Florida	51	Telemundo
WSEC	Jacksonville, Illinois	14	PBS
WSEE-TV	Erie, Pennsylvania	35	CBS
WSES	Tuscaloosa, Alabama	33	Heroes & Icons
WSET-TV	Lynchburg, Virginia	13	ABC
WSFA	Montgomery, Alabama	12	NBC
WSFJ-TV	London, Ohio	51	Bounce TV
WSFL-TV	Miami, Florida	39	The CW
WSFX-TV	Wilmington, North Carolina	26	Fox
WSIL-TV	Harrisburg, Illinois	3	ABC
WSIU-TV	Carbondale, Illinois	8	PBS
WSJV	Elkhart, Indiana	28	Heroes & Icons
WSKA	Corning, New York	30	PBS
WSKG-TV	Binghamton, New York	46	PBS
WSKY-TV	Manteo, North Carolina	4	Independent
WSLS-TV	Roanoke, Virginia	10	NBC
WSMH	Flint, Michigan	66	Fox
WSMV-TV	Nashville, Tennessee	4	NBC
WSNS-TV	Chicago, Illinois	44	Telemundo
WSOC-TV	Charlotte, North Carolina	9	ABC
WSPA-TV	Spartanburg, South Carolina	7	CBS
WSPX-TV	Syracuse, New York	56	Ion Television
WSRE	Pensacola, Florida	23	PBS
WSST-TV	Cordele, Georgia	55	MyNetworkTV
WSTE-DT	Ponce, Puerto Rico	7	Spanish Independent
WSTM-TV	Syracuse, New York	3	NBC
WSTR-TV	Cincinnati, Ohio	64	MyNetworkTV
WSUR-DT	Ponce, Puerto Rico	9	Univision
WSVI	Christiansted, U.S.V.I.	8	Ion Television
WSVN	Miami, Florida	7	Fox
WSWB	Scranton, Pennsylvania	38	The CW
WSWG	Valdosta, Georgia	44	CBS
WSWP-TV	Grandview, West Virginia	9	PBS
WSYM-TV	Lansing, Michigan	47	Fox
WSYR-TV	Syracuse, New York	9	ABC
WSYT	Syracuse, New York	68	Fox
WSYX	Columbus, Ohio	6	ABC
WTAE-TV	Pittsburgh, Pennsylvania	4	ABC
WTAJ-TV	Altoona, Pennsylvania	10	CBS
WTAP-TV	Parkersburg, West Virginia	15	NBC
WTAT-TV	Charleston, South Carolina	24	Fox
WTBY-TV	Jersey City, New Jersey	54	TBN
WTCE-TV	Fort Pierce, Florida	21	TBN
WTCI	Chattanooga, Tennessee	45	PBS
WTCT	Marion, Illinois	27	TCT
WTCV	San Juan, Puerto Rico	18	Mega TV
WTEN	Albany, New York	10	ABC
WTGL	Leesburg, Florida	45	Religious
WTGS	Hardeeville, South Carolina	28	Fox
WTHI-TV	Terre Haute, Indiana	10	CBS
WTHR	Indianapolis, Indiana	13	NBC
WTIC-TV	Hartford, Connecticut	61	Fox
WTIN-TV	Ponce, Puerto Rico	4	Independent
WTIU	Bloomington, Indiana	30	PBS
WTJP-TV	Gadsden, Alabama	60	TBN
WTJR	Quincy, Illinois	16	CTN
WTJX-TV	Charlotte Amalie, U.S.V.I.	12	PBS
WTKR	Norfolk, Virginia	3	CBS
WTLF	Tallahassee, Florida	24	The CW
WTLH	Bainbridge, Georgia	49	Heroes & Icons
WTLJ	Muskegon, Michigan	54	TCT
WTLV	Jacksonville, Florida	12	NBC
WTMJ-TV	Milwaukee, Wisconsin	4	NBC
WTNH	New Haven, Connecticut	8	ABC
WTNZ	Knoxville, Tennessee	43	Fox
WTOC-TV	Savannah, Georgia	11	CBS
WTOG	Tampa, Florida	44	The CW
WTOK-TV	Meridian, Mississippi	11	ABC
WTOL	Toledo, Ohio	11	CBS
WTOM-TV	Cheboygan, Michigan	4	NBC
WTOV-TV	Steubenville, Ohio	9	NBC
WTPC-TV	Virginia Beach, Virginia	21	TBN
WTPX-TV	Antigo, Wisconsin	46	Ion Television
WTRF-TV	Wheeling, West Virginia	7	CBS
WTSF	Ashland, Kentucky	61	Daystar
WTSP	St. Petersburg, Florida	10	CBS
WTTA	St. Petersburg, Florida	38	MyNetworkTV
WTTE	Columbus, Ohio	28	TBD
WTTG	Washington, D.C.	5	Fox
WTTK	Kokomo, Indiana	15	CBS
WTTO	Homewood, Alabama	21	The CW
WTTV	Bloomington, Indiana	4	CBS
WTTW	Chicago, Illinois	11	PBS
WTVA	Tupelo, Mississippi	9	NBC
WTVC	Chattanooga, Tennessee	9	ABC
WTVD	Durham, North Carolina	11	ABC
WTVE	Willow Grove, Pennsylvania	51	Infomercials
WTVF	Nashville, Tennessee	5	CBS
WTVG	Toledo, Ohio	13	ABC
WTVH	Syracuse, New York	5	CBS
WTVI	Charlotte, North Carolina	42	PBS
WTVJ	Miami, Florida	6	NBC
WTVK	Oswego, Illinois	59	Corner Store TV
WTVM	Columbus, Georgia	9	ABC
WTVO	Rockford, Illinois	17	ABC
WTVP	Peoria, Illinois	47	PBS
WTVQ-DT	Lexington, Kentucky	36	ABC
WTVR-TV	Richmond, Virginia	6	CBS
WTVS	Detroit, Michigan	56	PBS
WTVT	Tampa, Florida	13	Fox
WTVW	Evansville, Indiana	7	The CW
WTVX	Fort Pierce, Florida	34	The CW
WTVY	Dothan, Alabama	4	CBS
WTVZ-TV	Norfolk, Virginia	33	MyNetworkTV
WTWC-TV	Tallahassee, Florida	40	NBC
WTWO	Terre Haute, Indiana	2	NBC
WTWV	Memphis, Tennessee	23	Religious
WTXF-TV	Philadelphia, Pennsylvania	29	Fox
WTXL-TV	Tallahassee, Florida	27	ABC
WUAB	Lorain, Ohio	43	MyNetworkTV
WUCF-TV	Orlando, Florida	24	PBS
WUCW	Minneapolis, Minnesota	23	The CW
WUFT	Gainesville, Florida	5	PBS
WUHF	Rochester, New York	31	Fox
WUJA	Caguas, Puerto Rico	58	Religious
WUNC-TV	Chapel Hill, North Carolina	4	PBS
WUND-TV	Edenton, North Carolina	2	PBS
WUNE-TV	Linville, North Carolina	17	PBS Encore
WUNF-TV	Asheville, North Carolina	33	PBS
WUNG-TV	Concord, North Carolina	58	PBS
WUNI	Marlborough, Massachusetts	66	Univision
WUNJ-TV	Wilmington, North Carolina	39	PBS
WUNK-TV	Greenville, North Carolina	25	PBS
WUNL-TV	Winston-Salem, North Carolina	26	PBS
WUNM-TV	Jacksonville, North Carolina	19	PBS Encore
WUNP-TV	Roanoke Rapids, North Carolina	36	PBS Encore
WUNU	Lumberton, North Carolina	31	PBS
WUNW	Canton, North Carolina	27	PBS Encore
WUPA	Atlanta, Georgia	69	CBS
WUPL	Slidell, Louisiana	54	MyNetworkTV
WUPV	Ashland, Virginia	65	The CW
WUPW	Toledo, Ohio	36	Fox
WUPX-TV	Morehead, Kentucky	67	Ion Television
WUSA	Washington, D.C.	9	CBS
WUSI-TV	Olney, Illinois	16	PBS
WUTB	Baltimore, Maryland	24	TBD
WUTF-TV	Worcester, Massachusetts	27	UniMás
WUTR	Utica, New York	20	ABC
WUTV	Buffalo, New York	29	Fox
WUVC-DT	Fayetteville, North Carolina	40	Univision
WUVG-DT	Athens, Georgia	34	Univision
WUVN	Hartford, Connecticut	18	Univision
WUVP-DT	Vineland, New Jersey	65	Univision
WUXP-TV	Nashville, Tennessee	30	MyNetworkTV
WVAH-TV	Charleston, West Virginia	11	Decades
WVAN-TV	Savannah, Georgia	9	PBS
WVBT	Virginia Beach, Virginia	43	Fox
WVCY-TV	Milwaukee, Wisconsin	30	Religious
WVEA-TV	Tampa, Florida	50	Univision
WVEC	Hampton, Virginia	13	ABC
WVEN-TV	Melbourne, Florida	43	Univision
WVEO	Aguadilla, Puerto Rico	17	Mega TV
WVER	Rutland, Vermont	28	PBS
WVFX	Clarksburg, West Virginia	10	Fox
WVIA-TV	Scranton, Pennsylvania	44	PBS
WVII-TV	Bangor, Maine	7	ABC
WVIR-TV	Charlottesville, Virginia	29	NBC
WVIT	New Britain, Connecticut	30	NBC
WVIZ	Cleveland, Ohio	25	PBS
WVLA-TV	Baton Rouge, Louisiana	33	NBC
WVLR	Tazewell, Tennessee	48	CTN
WVLT-TV	Knoxville, Tennessee	8	CBS
WVNS-TV	Lewisburg, West Virginia	59	CBS
WVNY	Burlington, Vermont	22	ABC
WVOZ-TV	Ponce, Puerto Rico	48	Mega TV
WVPB-TV	Huntington, West Virginia	33	PBS
WVPT	Staunton, Virginia	51	PBS
WVPX-TV	Akron, Ohio	23	Ion Television
WVPY	New Market, Virginia	51	PBS
WVSN	Humacao, Puerto Rico	68	Religious
WVTB	St. Johnsbury, Vermont	20	PBS
WVTM-TV	Birmingham, Alabama	13	NBC
WVTV	Milwaukee, Wisconsin	18	The CW
WVUA	Tuscaloosa, Alabama	23	Cozi TV
WVUE-DT	New Orleans, Louisiana	8	Fox
WVUT	Vincennes, Indiana	22	PBS
WVVA	Bluefield, West Virginia	6	NBC
WVXF	Charlotte Amalie, U.S.V.I.	17	This TV/Fox
WWAY	Wilmington, North Carolina	3	ABC
WWBT	Richmond, Virginia	12	NBC
WWCP-TV	Johnstown, Pennsylvania	8	Fox
WWCW	Lynchburg, Virginia	21	The CW
WWDP	Norwell, Massachusetts	46	ShopHQ
WWHO	Chillicothe, Ohio	53	The CW
WWJ-TV	Detroit, Michigan	62	CBS
WWJE-DT	Derry, New Hampshire	50	True Crime Network
WWJS	Hickory, North Carolina	14	Independent
WWJX	Jackson, Mississippi	51	TCT
WWL-TV	New Orleans, Louisiana	4	CBS
WWLP	Springfield, Massachusetts	22	NBC
WWMB	Florence, South Carolina	21	Dabl
WWMT	Kalamazoo, Michigan	3	CBS
WWNY-TV	Carthage, New York	7	CBS
WWOR-TV	Secaucus, New Jersey	9	MyNetworkTV
WWPB	Hagerstown, Maryland	31	PBS
WWPX-TV	Martinsburg, West Virginia	60	Ion Television
WWRS-TV	Mayville, Wisconsin	52	TBN
WWSB	Sarasota, Florida	40	ABC
WWSI	Atlantic City, New Jersey	62	Telemundo
WWTI	Watertown, New York	50	ABC
WWTO-TV	Naperville, Illinois	35	TBN
WWTV	Cadillac, Michigan	9	CBS
WWTW	Senatobia, Mississippi	34	TCT
WWUP-TV	Sault Ste. Marie, Michigan	10	CBS
WXBU	Lancaster, Pennsylvania	15	TBD
WXCW	Naples, Florida	46	The CW
WXEL-TV	Boynton Beach, Florida	42	PBS
WXFT-DT	Aurora, Illinois	60	Univision
WXGA-TV	Waycross, Georgia	8	PBS
WXIA-TV	Atlanta, Georgia	11	NBC
WXII-TV	Winston-Salem, North Carolina	12	NBC
WXIN	Indianapolis, Indiana	59	Fox
WXIX-TV	Newport, Kentucky	19	Fox
WXLV-TV	Winston-Salem, North Carolina	45	ABC
WXMI	Grand Rapids, Michigan	17	Fox
WXOW	La Crosse, Wisconsin	19	ABC
WXPX-TV	Bradenton, Florida	66	Ion Television
WXTV-DT	Paterson, New Jersey	41	Univision
WXTX	Columbus, Georgia	54	Fox
WXXA-TV	Albany, New York	23	Fox
WXXI-TV	Rochester, New York	21	PBS
WXXV-TV	Gulfport, Mississippi	25	Fox
WXYZ-TV	Detroit, Michigan	7	ABC
WYCI	Saranac Lake, New York	40	MyNetworkTV
WYCW	Asheville, North Carolina	62	The CW
WYDC	Corning, New York	48	Fox
WYDN	Lowell, Massachusetts	48	Daystar
WYDO	Greenville, North Carolina	14	Fox
WYES-TV	New Orleans, Louisiana	12	PBS
WYFF	Greenville, South Carolina	4	NBC
WYIN	Gary, Indiana	56	PBS
WYMT-TV	Hazard, Kentucky	57	CBS
WYOU	Scranton, Pennsylvania	22	CBS
WYOW	Eagle River, Wisconsin	34	The CW
WYPX-TV	Amsterdam, New York	55	Ion Television
WYTV	Youngstown, Ohio	33	ABC
WYZZ-TV	Bloomington, Illinois	43	Fox
WZBJ	Danville, Virginia	24	MyNetworkTV
WZDX	Huntsville, Alabama	54	Fox
WZME	Bridgeport, Connecticut	43	Story Television
WZMQ	Marquette, Michigan	19	MeTV/CBS
WZPX-TV	Battle Creek, Michigan	43	Ion Television
WZRB	Columbia, South Carolina	47	Ion Television
WZTV	Nashville, Tennessee	17	Fox
WZVI	Charlotte Amalie, U.S.V.I.	21	Ion Television
WZVN-TV	Naples, Florida	26	ABC
WZZM	Grand Rapids, Michigan	13	ABC

== See also ==
- Call signs in North America#United States
- List of United States over-the-air television networks
