= Channel 23 digital TV stations in the United States =

The following television stations broadcast on digital channel 23 in the United States:

- K23AA-D in Beatrice, Nebraska
- K23BJ-D in Lake Havasu City, Arizona
- K23BV-D in Montpelier, Idaho
- K23CU-D in Prineville, Oregon
- K23DB-D in La Grande, Oregon
- K23DE-D in Childress, Texas
- K23DJ-D in Ekalaka, Montana
- K23DK-D in Meadview, Arizona
- K23DO-D in Malta, Idaho
- K23DS-D in Evanston, Wyoming
- K23DV-D in Beryl/Modena/New, Utah
- K23DX-D in Pitkin, Colorado, on virtual channel 8, which rebroadcasts KTSC
- K23EX-D in Medford, Oregon
- K23FC-D in Elko, Nevada
- K23FE-D in Gallup, New Mexico
- K23FH-D in Milton-Freewater, Oregon
- K23FO-D in Jackson, Minnesota
- K23FP-D in Olivia, Minnesota, on virtual channel 11, which rebroadcasts KARE
- K23FR-D in Winnemucca, Nevada
- K23FT-D in Myton, Utah
- K23FV-D in Kingman, Arizona
- K23FY-D in Frost, Minnesota
- K23FZ-D in Camp Verde, Arizona
- K23GF-D in Dove Creek, etc., Colorado, on virtual channel 23
- K23GK-D in Astoria, Oregon, on virtual channel 10, which rebroadcasts KOPB-TV
- K23GR-D in Preston, Idaho, on virtual channel 5, which rebroadcasts KSL-TV
- K23HT-D in St. Maries, Idaho
- K23IC-D in Huntsville, etc., Utah, on virtual channel 5, which rebroadcasts KSL-TV
- K23IS-D in Ridgecrest, etc., California, on virtual channel 56, which rebroadcasts KDOC-TV
- K23IV-D in Spring Glen, Utah
- K23IX-D in Clark, etc., Wyoming
- K23IZ-D in Strong City, Oklahoma
- K23JC-D in Montezuma Creek/Aneth, Utah
- K23JD-D in Colfax, New Mexico
- K23JH-D in Leadore, Idaho
- K23JK-D in Tillamook, Oregon
- K23JN-D in Virgin, Utah
- K23JU-D in Prosser, Washington
- K23JV-D in Green River, Utah
- K23JX-D in Hatch, Utah
- K23JY-D in Huntington, Utah
- K23KC-D in Bluff, etc., Utah
- K23KD-D in Coos Bay, etc., Oregon
- K23KL-D in Farmington, New Mexico
- K23KN-D in Las Animas, Colorado
- K23KO-D in Rural Beaver County, Utah
- K23KP-D in Fishlake Resort, Utah
- K23KY-D in Council, Idaho
- K23KZ-D in Bigfork/Marcell, Minnesota
- K23LB-D in Fargo, North Dakota
- K23LE-D in Sedalia, Missouri
- K23LF-D in Eureka, Nevada
- K23LH-D in Cortez, Colorado
- K23LW-D in Emigrant, Montana
- K23LX-D in Conrad, Montana
- K23ME-D in Camas Valley, Oregon
- K23MF-D in St. James, Minnesota
- K23ML-D in Newberry Springs, California, on virtual channel 23
- K23MQ-D in Duluth, Minnesota
- K23MT-D in Mexican Hat, Utah
- K23MU-D in Bridgeport, Washington
- K23MV-D in Carlsbad, New Mexico
- K23NB-D in York, Nebraska
- K23ND-D in Sayre, Oklahoma
- K23NE-D in Ellensburg, Washington
- K23NF-D in Romeo, etc., Colorado
- K23NH-D in Seiling, Oklahoma
- K23NI-D in Crescent City, California
- K23NJ-D in Prescott, etc., Arizona, on virtual channel 8, which rebroadcasts KAET
- K23NK-D in Orderville, Utah
- K23NL-D in Cottonwood/Grangeville, Idaho
- K23NM-D in Sandpoint, Idaho
- K23NN-D in Las Vegas, New Mexico
- K23NP-D in Thompson Falls, Montana
- K23NQ-D in Lewiston, Idaho
- K23NR-D in Mount Pleasant, Utah, on virtual channel 13, which rebroadcasts KSTU
- K23NS-D in Rockaway Beach, Oregon
- K23NT-D in Mayfield, Utah
- K23NU-D in Richfield, etc., Utah, on virtual channel 16, which rebroadcasts KUPX-TV
- K23NV-D in Summit County, Utah
- K23NW-D in Montrose, Colorado
- K23NX-D in Gateway, Colorado
- K23NY-D in St. George, Utah, on virtual channel 4, which rebroadcasts KTVX
- K23OA-D in Kanarraville, Utah
- K23OC-D in Lincoln City/Newport, Oregon
- K23OD-D in Scipio, Utah
- K23OE-D in Kasilof, Alaska
- K23OH-D in Orangeville, Utah, on virtual channel 16, which rebroadcasts KUPX-TV
- K23OI-D in Tucumcari, New Mexico
- K23OK-D in Walker Lake, Nevada
- K23OM-D in Victorville, California, on virtual channel 47, which rebroadcasts KCET
- K23ON-D in Lund & Preston, Nevada
- K23OO-D in Moon Ranch, New Mexico
- K23OR-D in Pagosa Springs, Colorado
- K23OS-D in London Springs, Oregon
- K23OT-D in Juliaetta, Idaho
- K23OU-D in Pueblo, Colorado
- K23OV-D in Hood River, Oregon, on virtual channel 6, which rebroadcasts KOIN
- K23OW-D in Hot Springs, Arkansas
- K23OX-D in Holyoke, Colorado
- K23PA-D in Klamath Falls, Oregon
- K23PG-D in Yakima, Washington
- K23PH-D in Chico, California
- K23PL-D in Shonto, Arizona, on virtual channel 38
- K23PN-D in La Pine, Oregon
- K23PU-D in Norfolk, Nebraska
- KAGS-LD in Bryan, Texas
- KCDN-LD in Kansas City, Missouri, on virtual channel 43
- KCDO-TV in Sterling, Colorado, on virtual channel 3
- KCDO-TV (DRT) in Kimball, Nebraska, on virtual channel 3
- KCTU-LD in Wichita, Kansas
- KCWI-TV in Ames, Iowa
- KCWT-CD in La Feria, Texas
- KDGL-LD in Sublette, Kansas
- KEDT in Corpus Christi, Texas
- KEKE in Hilo, Hawaii
- KETC in St. Louis, Missouri, on virtual channel 9
- KEVN-LD in Rapid City, South Dakota
- KEVU-CD in Eugene, Oregon
- KEZI in Elkton, Oregon
- KFUL-LD in San Luis Obispo, California
- KGMB in Honolulu, Hawaii
- KGSA-LD in San Antonio, Texas
- KGWZ-LD in Portland, Oregon, on virtual channel 8, which rebroadcasts KGW
- KIMG-LD in Ventura, California
- KIRO-TV in Seattle, Washington, on virtual channel 7
- KKIF-LD in Twin Falls, Idaho
- KLCW-TV in Wolfforth, Texas
- KLPB-TV in Lafayette, Louisiana
- KLTJ in Galveston, Texas, on virtual channel 22
- KLVD-LD in Las Vegas, Nevada
- KMUV-LD in Monterey, California
- KNCD-LD in Nacogdoches, Texas
- KNVA in Austin, Texas
- KODE-TV in Joplin, Missouri
- KONV-LD in Canton, Ohio, on virtual channel 28
- KPDD-LD in Evergreen, Colorado
- KPEJ-TV in Odessa, Texas
- KPVI-DT in Pocatello, Idaho
- KQCA in Stockton, California, an ATSC 3.0 station, on virtual channel 58
- KQDA-LD in Denison, Texas
- KQEG-CA in La Crescent, Minnesota
- KRDT-CD in Redding, California
- KREG-TV in Glenwood Springs, Colorado
- KRWG-TV in Las Cruces, New Mexico
- KRXI-TV in Reno, Nevada
- KSBI in Oklahoma City, Oklahoma
- KSCZ-LD in San Jose-San Francisco, California, on virtual channel 16
- KSL-TV in Salt Lake City, Utah, on virtual channel 5
- KSLA in Shreveport, Louisiana
- KSMV-LD in Los Angeles, California, on virtual channel 31, which rebroadcasts KVMD
- KSNL-LD in Salina, Kansas
- KSXF-LD in Sioux Falls, South Dakota
- KTCI-TV in St. Paul, Minnesota, on virtual channel 2
- KTFF-DT in Porterville, California
- KTMF in Missoula, Montana
- KTPE-LD in Kansas City, Missouri
- KTUO-LD in Tulsa, Oklahoma
- KTVP-LD in Phoenix, Arizona, on virtual channel 23
- KTVS-LD in Albuquerque, New Mexico
- KTXD-TV in Greenville, Texas, on virtual channel 47
- KVCV-LD in Victoria, Texas
- KVMD in Twentynine Palms, California, on virtual channel 31
- KVOA in Tucson, Arizona
- W23BV-D in Evansville, Indiana
- W23BW-D in Madison, Wisconsin
- W23DM-D in Falmouth, Kentucky, on virtual channel 52, which rebroadcasts WKON
- W23EB-D in Cadillac, Michigan
- W23EQ-D in Danville, Illinois
- W23ER-D in Poughkeepsie, New York, on virtual channel 17, which rebroadcasts WMHT
- W23ES-D in Marshall, North Carolina
- W23EU-D in Rutland, Vermont
- W23EV-D in Carrollton, Georgia, on virtual channel 28, which rebroadcasts WJSP-TV
- W23EW-D in Springfield, Illinois
- W23EX-D in Sussex, New Jersey, on virtual channel 58, which rebroadcasts WNJB
- W23EY-D in Canton, North Carolina
- W23EZ-D in Sylva, North Carolina
- W23FC-D in Eau Claire, Wisconsin
- W23FH-D in Erie, Pennsylvania
- W23FI-D in Valdosta, Georgia
- W23FJ-D in Jennings, Florida
- W23FL-D in Traverse City, Michigan
- W23FN-D in Albany, Georgia
- WAAU-LD in Augusta, Georgia
- WAPW-CD in Abingdon, etc., Virginia
- WAUA-LD in Columbus, Georgia
- WNGT-CD in Smithfield-Selma, North Carolina, an ATSC 3.0 station, on virtual channel 34
- WBAY-TV in Green Bay, Wisconsin
- WBSF in Bay City, Michigan
- WBTV in Charlotte, North Carolina, on virtual channel 3
- WBXZ-LD in Buffalo, New York
- WCIU-TV in Chicago, Illinois, on virtual channel 26
- WCUH-LD in Fort Wayne, Indiana
- WCVI-TV in Christiansted, U.S. Virgin Islands
- WDDN-LD in Washington, D.C., on virtual channel 23
- WDMR-LD in Springfield, Massachusetts
- WDPM-DT in Mobile, Alabama
- WDTI in Indianapolis, Indiana, on virtual channel 69
- WDVM-TV in Hagerstown, Maryland, on virtual channel 25
- WECT in Wilmington, North Carolina
- WETM-TV in Elmira, New York
- WFBN-LD in Rockford, Illinois
- WFLI-TV in Cleveland, Tennessee
- WFTY-DT in Smithtown, New York, on virtual channel 67
- WHPM-LD in Hattiesburg, Mississippi
- WHSU-CD in Syracuse, New York
- WITD-CD in Chesapeake, Virginia
- WJDE-CD in Nashville, Tennessee, on virtual channel 31
- WJDG-LD in Grundy, Virginia
- WKCF in Clermont, Florida, on virtual channel 18
- WKPD in Paducah, Kentucky
- WKPI-TV in Pikeville, Kentucky
- WKTB-CD in Norcross, Georgia, on virtual channel 47
- WKZT-TV in Elizabethtown, Kentucky
- WLAE-TV in New Orleans, Louisiana
- WLED-TV in Littleton, New Hampshire
- WLTV-DT in Miami, Florida, on virtual channel 23
- WMDV-LD in Danville, Virginia
- WMJF-CD in Towson, Maryland, on virtual channel 39
- WNJS in Camden, New Jersey, on virtual channel 23
- WNJT in Trenton, New Jersey, uses WNJS' spectrum, on virtual channel 52
- WNPI-DT in Norwood, New York
- WNWO-TV in Toledo, Ohio
- WOIL-CD in Talladega, Alabama
- WPGA-TV in Perry, Georgia
- WPXI in Pittsburgh, Pennsylvania, on virtual channel 11
- WPXG-TV in Concord, New Hampshire, on virtual channel 21
- WQAP-LD in Montgomery, Alabama
- WQPT-TV in Moline, Illinois
- WQSJ-CD in Quebradillas, Puerto Rico, on virtual channel 48, which rebroadcasts WSJN-CD
- WRGX-LD in Dothan, Alabama
- WSVT-LD in Tampa, Florida, on virtual channel 18
- WTAS-LD in Waukesha, Wisconsin, on virtual channel 47
- WTOC-TV in Savannah, Georgia
- WTVR-TV in Richmond, Virginia
- WTWV in Memphis, Tennessee
- WUNC-TV (DRT) in Oxford, North Carolina, on virtual channel 4
- WUSI-TV in Olney, Illinois
- WVSN in Humacao, Puerto Rico, on virtual channel 68
- WVUA-CD in Tuscaloosa/Northport, Alabama
- WWHO in Chillicothe, Ohio, an ATSC 3.0 station, on virtual channel 53
- WWJX in Jackson, Mississippi
- WWTW in Senatobia, Mississippi, uses WTWV's spectrum.
- WXDT-LD in Naples, Florida
- WXNY-LD in New York, New York, on virtual channel 32
- WYDN in Lowell, Massachusetts, uses WPXG-TV's spectrum, on virtual channel 48
- WZPJ-LD in Bennington, Vermont
- WZVC-LD in Athens, Georgia

The following stations, which are no longer licensed, formerly broadcast on digital channel 23:

- K23EC-D in Canadian, Texas
- K23KV-D in Austin, Nevada
- K23LK-D in Modesto, California
- K23NZ-D in Three Forks, Montana
- KHMM-CD in Hanford, California
- WIEK-LD in Midland, Michigan
- WLDW-LD in Myrtle Beach, South Carolina
- WODX-LD in Springfield, Illinois
- WQDU-LD in Albany, Georgia
- WTSD-CD in Philadelphia, Pennsylvania
- WUEA-LD in Lafayette, Indiana
- WUOF-LD in Gainesville, Florida
