= WWTW =

Television station in Senatobia, Mississippi

- Senatobia, Mississippi; Memphis, Tennessee; United States
- City: Senatobia, Mississippi
- Channels: Digital: 23 (UHF), shared with WTWV; Virtual: 34

Programming
- Affiliations: 34.1: TCT

Ownership
- Owner: Total Christian Television; (Memphis Educational Television, Inc.)
- Sister stations: WTWV

History
- First air date: December 7, 2010
- Former channel numbers: Digital: 34 (UHF, until 2018)
- Former affiliations: Independent (2010–2020)
- Call sign meaning: Disambiguation of sister station WTWV

Technical information
- Licensing authority: FCC
- Facility ID: 84214
- ERP: 1,000 kW
- HAAT: 261 m (856 ft)
- Transmitter coordinates: 35°12′34.3″N 89°49′1.4″W

Links
- Public license information: Public file; LMS
- Website: www.tct.tv

WWTW (channel 34) is a religious television station licensed to Senatobia, Mississippi, United States, serving the Memphis, Tennessee, area. It is owned by Total Christian Television (TCT) alongside religious independent WTWV (channel 14). WWTW and WTWV share studios on Kirby Whitten Road in the northeast section of Memphis; through a channel sharing agreement, the two stations transmit using WTWV's spectrum from a tower in Bartlett, Tennessee.

Until 2018, WWTW's transmitter was located near Arkabutla Lake in northwestern Tate County, Mississippi. To expand its coverage area, the station was simulcast on WTWV's second digital subchannel.

== History ==
Former station logo from 2010 to 2020.

WWTW signed on the air as an independent station on December 7, 2010. Branded as ACME Classics TV, the station mainly aired classic television shows, mostly public domain content.

On May 28, 2020, Flinn Broadcasting Corporation announced that it would sell WWTW and WTWV, along with sister stations KCWV in Duluth, Minnesota, WWJX in Jackson, Mississippi, WBIH in Selma, Alabama, and WFBD in Destin, Florida, to Marion, Illinois–based Total Christian Television for an undisclosed price pending Federal Communications Commission (FCC) approval. WWTW and WTWV would become the second and third full-power religious stations in the Memphis area, with WWTW being an owned-and-operated station of the TCT network.

== Subchannels ==
Subchannel of WTWV and WWTW
License	Subchannel	Res.	Short name	Programming
WTWV	14.1	480i	WTWV-SD	Religious independent
WWTW	34.1	1080i	WWTW HD	TCT
