= Blab TV =

TV channel in Pensacola, Florida, United States

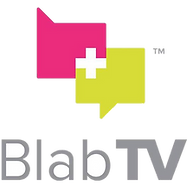
- Broadcast area: Northwest Florida; South Alabama

Ownership
- Owner: BTO Media

History
- Launched: February 1, 1984

Links
- Website: blabtv.com

Blab TV is a local television channel in Pensacola, Florida, United States. It airs local programming as well as locally produced infomercials for businesses in the Florida Panhandle. Blab TV programming airs on local cable systems and on WPAN (channel 53.5), a broadcast station serving the Mobile–Pensacola region.

== History ==
Blab TV (originally stylized BLAB-TV, a backronym for Basic Local Area Broadcasting or Basic Local Audience Broadcasting) was started by Fred Vigodsky and debuted on February 1, 1984, with a 90-minute program aired through local cable systems; Vigodsky owned the network until its 2016 sale to a consortium of Doug Bunze, John Tolan, and Eric Ober. During the time he owned it, Vigdosky expanded its reach from the Florida panhandle to the broader Gulf Coast region; it even briefly expanded beyond to New Orleans and Richmond, Virginia. It also appeared on broadcast television for the first time when it leased 37 hours a week from WPAN, at the time an inactive station. By 1994, 400,000 Mobile–Pensacola-area cable viewers had access to BLAB. The next year, BLAB moved into new studios in the former J. C. Penney store in downtown Pensacola.

Joe Scarborough used Blab TV in his 1994 campaign to run for Florida's 1st congressional district.

In 2011, Blab TV leased a subchannel on WFBD, a regional television station, expanding its reach. Since October 2020, it has returned to WPAN, airing as its main subchannel until November 2026 when it was moved to the 53.5 subchannel.

In 2024, Blab TV announced an agreement to air some Pensacola Blue Wahoos games. The Blue Wahoos are the Double-A affiliate of the Miami Marlins.
