= WTWV (disambiguation) =

WTWV may refer to:

- WTWV, a television station in Memphis, Tennessee
- WTWV-FM, a radio station in Suffolk, Virginia

The following stations have previously used the WTWV call sign:

- WFRQ, Cape Cod, Massachusetts
- WTVA, Tupelo, Mississippi
- WPPN, Chicago, Illinois
