= WTBU =

WTBU may refer to:

- WTBU (FM), a radio station (95.3 MHz) licensed to York Center, Maine, United States
- WDTI, a television station (channel 44) in Indianapolis, Indiana, which held the call sign WTBU-TV until 2004
- WTBU (Boston University), an unlicensed college radio station
