= WTWV =

Television station in Memphis, Tennessee

- Memphis, Tennessee; United States
- Channels: Digital: 23 (UHF), shared with WWTW; Virtual: 14

Programming
- Affiliations: 14.1: Religious independent

Ownership
- Owner: Total Christian Television; (Faith Community Television, Inc.)
- Sister stations: WWTW

History
- First air date: May 28, 2008
- Former channel number: Virtual: 23 (2008–2025)
- Call sign meaning: Tribute to the former calls of WTVA

Technical information
- Licensing authority: FCC
- Facility ID: 81692
- ERP: 1,000 kW
- HAAT: 261 m (856 ft)
- Transmitter coordinates: 35°12′34.3″N 89°49′1.4″W

Links
- Public license information: Public file; LMS

WTWV (channel 14) is a religious independent television station in Memphis, Tennessee, United States. It is owned by Total Christian Television alongside WWTW (channel 34). WTWV and WWTW share studios on Kirby Whitten Road in the northeast section of Memphis; through a channel sharing agreement, the two stations transmit using WTWV's spectrum from a tower in Bartlett, Tennessee.

== History ==
The station was originally scheduled to launch on May 22, 2008, but WTWV's debut was delayed due to technical difficulties. WTWV officially signed on the air on May 28, 2008, broadcasting on UHF channel 14, but has later relocated to channel 23.

On May 28, 2020, Flinn Broadcasting Corporation announced that it would sell WTWV and WWTW, along with sister stations KCWV in Duluth, Minnesota, WWJX in Jackson, Mississippi, WBIH in Selma, Alabama, and WFBD in Destin, Florida, to Total Christian Television for an undisclosed price pending Federal Communications Commission (FCC) approval. WTWV and WWTW would become the second and third full-power religious stations in the Memphis area, with WWTW being an owned-and-operated station of the TCT network.

== Technical information ==
=== Subchannel ===
Subchannel of WTWV and WWTW
License	Subchannel	Res.	Short name	Programming
WTWV	14.1	480i	WTWV-SD	Religious independent
WWTW	34.1	1080i	WWTW HD	TCT
