= WUWF =

Coordinates: 30.404°N 86.993°W

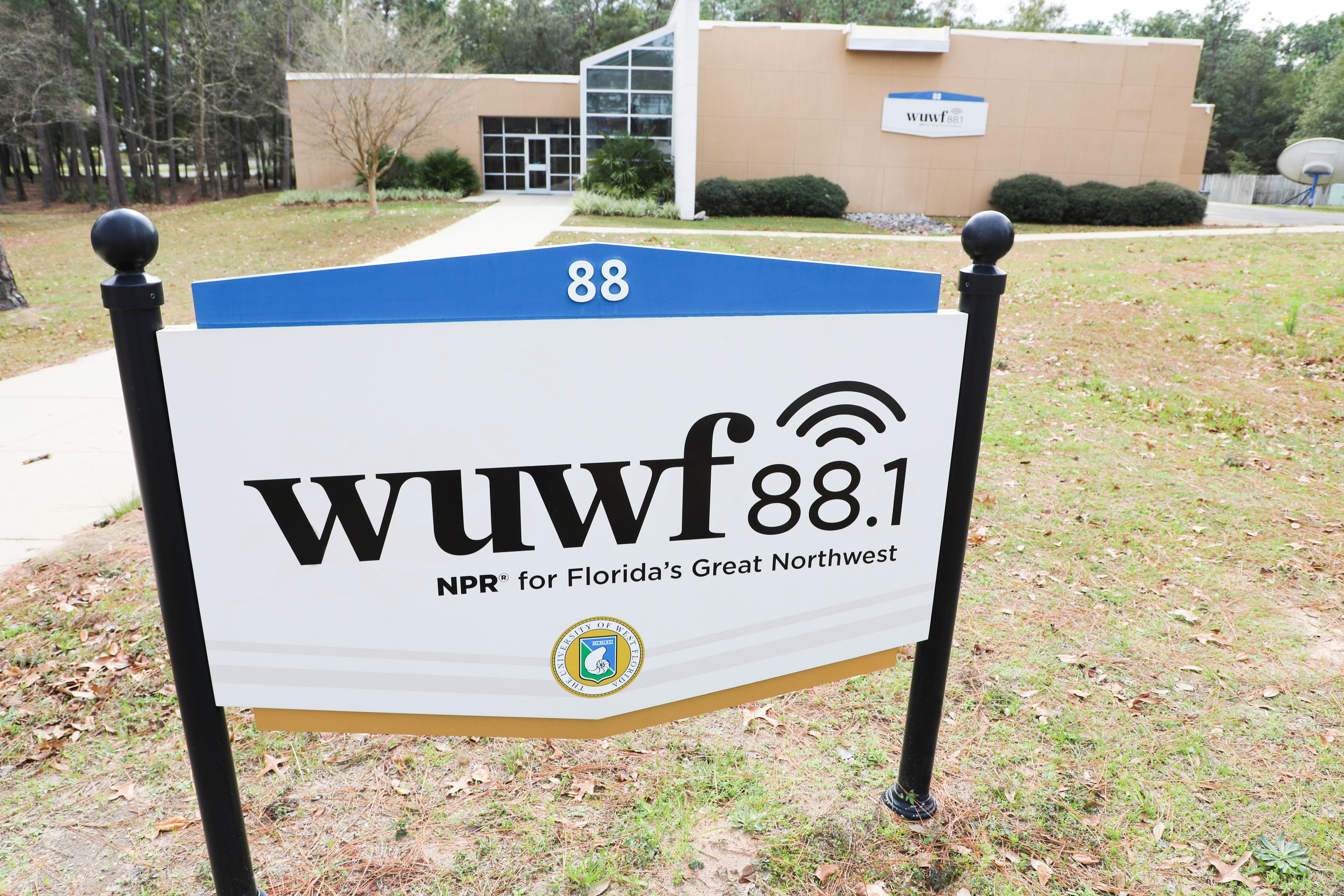

Pensacola, Florida; United States
- Broadcast area: Central Gulf Coast
- Frequency: 88.1 MHz (HD Radio)

Programming
- Format: Public radio
- Subchannels: HD2: Classical music; HD3: Radio reader "WUWF Sightline"
- Affiliations: National Public Radio; Public Radio Exchange; Florida Public Media; Florida Public Radio Network; American Public Media

Ownership
- Owner: University of West Florida

History
- First air date: June 21, 1981
- Call sign meaning: University of West Florida

Technical information
- Licensing authority: FCC
- Facility ID: 66570
- Class: C1
- ERP: 100,000 watts
- HAAT: 187.2 meters (614 ft)

Links
- Public license information: Public file; LMS
- Webcast: HD1: Listen live; HD2: Listen live; HD3: Listen live
- Website: wuwf.org

WUWF Public Media consists of radio, television and internet services. WUWF (88.1 FM) is a public radio station licensed to the board of trustees of the University of West Florida, located in Pensacola, Florida. The station is a member of National Public Radio, Florida Public Media, Florida Public Radio Network, American Public Media and Public Radio Exchange. The station's main signal is broadcast on 88.1 FM with a non-directional power output of 100,000 watts from a 1,000 feet (300 m) tower located in Midway, Florida. The primary antenna array is centered at 614 feet (187 m).

Broadcasting a wide variety of network programs, WUWF FM is also known for locally produced programming like Acoustic Interlude and RadioLive. Both of these programs have national and international followers who listen on the station's internet broadcast service..

For 30 years, WUWF FM has produced a wide variety of local, national and international programming. WUWF 88.1 FM is the official Emergency Alert System broadcaster serving the Pensacola metropolitan area. WUWF operates in Hybrid Digital (HD) mode, providing the opportunity to multicast, which means three separate radio channels are available via HD receivers: WUWF FM-1, WUWF FM-2 and WUWF FM-3.

== WUWF FM-2 and WUWF FM-3 ==
On January 31, 2011, the entire broadcast schedule of WUWF FM-2 was switched to a classical music format. On September 26, 2011, WUWF FM-3 was launched with a radio reader format. This third channel broadcasts Sightline for the visually impaired which features a 24-hour schedule including daily readings of the Pensacola News Journal and information from the Gatewave reading service. A digital HD radio is needed in order to listen to WUWF FM-2 and WUWF FM-3 over the air. Sightline is also available on the secondary audio program of WSRE TV. All three WUWF program streams are available at the station's website.

== Television ==
WUWF-TV was launched in 2003. It can be seen on Cox Cable channel 4 in Pensacola and Escambia County, Florida, and in a live 500 kbit/s stream at the station's website. WUWF-TV features programming from the Classic Arts Showcase, Free Speech TV and Deutsche Welle. Locally produced programs include Inside UWF, Within Reason, Southern Gardening, and Coming of Age. WUWF-TV provides public-access television opportunities for the Pensacola community and employs a staff of students and volunteers.

== History ==
WUWF was founded in 1981 by the late Thomas K. Perry. Working with a core staff and hundreds of volunteers, WUWF has approximately 65,000 listeners. With the cutback of federal funding in the 1990s, WUWF began a course as a true listener-supported station: it operates largely with contributions from local individual listeners with additional support from locally based businesses. Only a small portion of the station's operating budget comes from state and federal grants. The University of West Florida also provides funds, mainly for facilities upkeep and utility bills.
