= WPAN =

Television station in Fort Walton Beach, Florida

- Fort Walton Beach–Pensacola, Florida; Mobile, Alabama; United States
- City: Fort Walton Beach, Florida
- Channels: Digital: 21 (UHF); Virtual: 53
- Branding: Emerald Coast PBS

Programming
- Affiliations: 53.1: PBS; for others, see § Technical information and subchannels

Ownership
- Owner: B&C Communications, LLC
- Operator: Emerald Coast PBS

History
- Founded: 1983
- First air date: February 14, 1984
- Former channel numbers: Analog: 53 (UHF, 1984–2009); Digital: 31 (UHF, until 2020); Virtual: 53 (2009–2013), 40 (2013–2020)
- Former affiliations: Independent (1984–1986); Dark (1986–1988; 1991–1993; 2013–2014; 2015–2016); Religious (1988–1990); Star Television Network (1990–1991); WJTC (partial simulcast) (1991); Blab TV (1993–????; 2020–2026, now on 53.5); ValueVision (secondary, 1993–????); Shop at Home (until 2008); Jewelry TV (until 2013); Cozi TV (2013); Soul of the South (2014–2015); Vibrant TV Network (2016–2019); Antenna TV (2019–2020, 53.2 2020–2022)
- Call sign meaning: The Florida Panhandle

Technical information
- Licensing authority: FCC
- Facility ID: 31570
- ERP: 620 kW
- HAAT: 374.1 m (1,227 ft)
- Transmitter coordinates: 30°42′21″N 87°24′12″W

Links
- Public license information: Public file; LMS
- Website: emeraldcoastpbs.org

WPAN (channel 53), branded as Emerald Coast PBS, is a television station licensed to Fort Walton Beach, Florida, United States, serving northwest Florida and southwest Alabama. Although having a commercial broadcast license, its main channel carries non-commercial PBS programming. Owned by B&C Communications and operated by a nonprofit group under the Emerald Coast PBS banner, WPAN maintains transmitter facilities near Molino, Florida.

Originally applied for and built by a Fort Walton Beach–based group, WPAN debuted on February 14, 1984, as an independent station. It struggled to sell advertising and shut down on November 16, 1986. Franklin Broadcasting put WPAN back on the air in 1988 with more religious programming, but it operated sporadically, briefly carrying programming from the Star Television Network and Pensacola-based independent station WJTC, which lacked cable carriage in some areas. After going off the air again in 1991, WPAN began broadcasting again in 1993; it aired home shopping and programming from Blab TV, a local cable channel that produced infomercials and sponsored segments for local businesses. By the 2010s, Franklin was attempting to sell the station. It aired two diginets, Cozi TV and Soul of the South Network, on its main channel before leaving the air between 2015 and 2016.

B&C Communications purchased channel 53 in 2016 and aired programming from Vibrant TV Network, Antenna TV, and Blab TV. On November 1, 2026, WPAN became the new PBS member station for Northwest Florida, joining the network after former member WSRE discontinued PBS programming in July of that year.

== History ==
=== Construction and early years ===
The Fort Walton Beach Broadcasting Company applied in 1982 for a new television station on channel 53 to serve that city, a plan that had been gestating since 1980. Construction began in 1983, with the station to be based at a site near Tupelo Avenue and 4th Street in Fort Walton Beach.

WPAN intended to sign on in December 1983, but tower completion delays pushed the launch into 1984. The new station, which went on air on February 14, represented a $4 million investment. Programs telecast included family-oriented syndicated shows, movies, and sports. However, Fort Walton Beach Broadcasting could not operate the station from a financial standpoint, and it closed at midnight on November 16, 1986; one minority partner noted they simply could not sell enough advertising.

=== Franklin Broadcasting ownership ===
Channel 53 returned to the air on July 1, 1988, under the aegis of Franklin Broadcasting. The station's new programming included more religious fare. It operated only sporadically, and at one point, it was affiliated with the short-lived Star Television Network. By 1991, it was partially simulcasting WJTC in Pensacola in an agreement primarily conceived to allow some of that station's programs to be seen on cable systems otherwise unable to carry it. However, it would be dark for a full two years from 1991 to 1993. In 1993, the revival of must-carry legislation pushing channel 53 into more cable homes led to Franklin reviving WPAN, as did a contract with BLAB-TV (an acronym for "Basic Local Area Broadcasting"). BLAB, which produced local infomercials and sponsored segments for local businesses that aired on cable, purchased 37 hours a week of airtime on WPAN starting November 1; remaining hours were filled by ValueVision and Video Catalog, home shopping services.

Several attempts were made by Franklin over the years to sell the station, and it was silent for much of 2013 and 2014 pending sale. Neal Ardman was listed as managing the station in early 2013, when it began to air Cozi TV. It returned in 2014 with programming from the Soul of the South Network. From May 2015 to May 2016, WPAN was off the air under special temporary authority (STA) to be silent, as Franklin could not pay the electricity bill and had been placed into receivership.

=== B&C Communications ownership ===
On May 16, 2016, WPAN returned to the air under new owners B&C Communications as an affiliate of the Vibrant TV Network, and then in February 2019, after the Vibrant TV network ceased operations, it switched to carrying Antenna TV.

WPAN went off the air in October 2019 due to a dispute with the tower owner, who expected the debt from the prior owners to be repaid in order to gain access to the transmitter. Since the station needed to move to channel 21 as part of the Federal Communications Commission's repack, it opted to construct a new tower in Molino to offer market-wide coverage for the first time. WPAN returned to the airwaves in October 2020 after filing for another silent STA due to the tower situation. BLAB also returned to channel 53.

=== Emerald Coast PBS ===
On July 1, 2026, WSRE, owned by Pensacola State College (PSC), ended its PBS membership and decertified its relationship with the WSRE Foundation following cuts in state and federal funding.

On October 2, 2026, it was announced that WPAN would become the new PBS member station for the Pensacola area effective November 1 under the name "Emerald Coast PBS", through the efforts of a nonprofit group of local "concerned citizens" who strived to keep PBS coverage within the region. WPAN announced it would broadcast PBS and PBS Kids as subchannels and use office space and studios donated by the law firm Levin Papantonio to produce local programming.

== Technical information and subchannels ==
WPAN's transmitter is located near Molino, Florida. The station's signal is multiplexed:

Subchannels of WPAN
Subchannel	Res.	Short name	Programming
53.1	720p	WPANDT	PBS
53.2	720p	WPANDT2	TCT (WFBD)
53.3	480i	WPANDT3	Great (4:3)
53.4	480i	WPANDT4	MovieSphere Gold (4:3)
53.5	480i	WPANDT5	Blab TV (4:3)
53.6	480i	WPANDT6	PBS Kids

Simulcast of subchannels of another station

=== Former translator ===
WPAN formerly operated a repeater, W50CF, in Mobile, Alabama, which broadcast on analog channel 50 (and prior to that was W69AU channel 69). The translator was sold to Word of Life Community Church in Chickasaw, Alabama, before going off the air for good to make way for the digital signal of WFGX.
