= WMPV-TV =

Television station in Mobile, Alabama

- Mobile, Alabama; Pensacola, Florida; United States
- City: Mobile, Alabama
- Channels: Digital: 18 (UHF); Virtual: 21

Programming
- Affiliations: 21.1: TBN; for others, see § Subchannels

Ownership
- Owner: Trinity Broadcasting Network; (Trinity Broadcasting of Texas, Inc.)

History
- First air date: December 1985 (Note: The Broadcasting and Cable Yearbook says December 19, while the Television and Cable Factbook says December 15.)
- Former channel numbers: Analog: 21 (UHF, 1985–2009); Digital: 20 (UHF, until 2019)
- Former affiliations: Independent (1985–1989)

Technical information
- Licensing authority: FCC
- Facility ID: 60827
- ERP: 900 kW
- HAAT: 529 m (1,736 ft)
- Transmitter coordinates: 30°36′41″N 87°36′26.4″W

Links
- Public license information: Public file; LMS
- Website: www.tbn.org

WMPV-TV (channel 21) is a religious television station licensed to Mobile, Alabama, United States, serving southwest Alabama and northwest Florida. The station is owned by the Trinity Broadcasting Network (TBN). WMPV-TV's transmitter is located near Robertsdale, Alabama.

The station formerly operated from a studio located along the Interstate 65 Service Road in Mobile. That facility was one of several closed by TBN in 2019 following the Federal Communications Commission (FCC)'s repeal of the "Main Studio Rule", which required full-service television stations like WMPV-TV to maintain facilities in or near their communities of license.

== History ==
The station was founded in December 1985 by professional poker player Doyle Brunson and operated as a general-entertainment independent station until it switched to a Christian television format following a 1989 sale to Sonlight Broadcasting Systems, a new broadcast ministry based in Mobile and co-founded by television producer Paul Crouch Jr. and attorney and broadcaster Jay Sekulow. WMPV was Sonlight's flagship station, and over the next several years Sonlight would acquire other stations including WMCF-TV in Montgomery. All of Sonlight's stations were affiliated with TBN, which was co-founded by Paul Crouch Jr.'s parents Paul Sr. and Jan. As a TBN affiliate, WMPV carried most of the network's schedule while opting out at times to air alternate programming.

In 1997, WMPV was sold, along with the rest of Sonlight's stations, to All American TV (not to be confused with an unrelated television syndication company of a similar name), a minority-owned firm with close ties to the Trinity Broadcasting Network who already owned WTJP-TV in Gadsden; the sale to All American made the station a full-fledged affiliate of the network. WMPV became a TBN owned-and-operated station in 2000, when TBN purchased all of All American's stations.

== Subchannels ==
The station's signal is multiplexed:

Subchannels of WMPV-TV
Subchannel	Res.	Short name	Programming
21.1	720p	TBN HD	TBN
21.2	720p	TVDEALS	Infomercials
21.3	480i	Inspire	TBN Inspire
21.4	480i	ONTV4U	OnTV4U (infomercials) (4:3)
21.5	480i	POSITIV	Positiv

TBN-owned full-power stations permanently ceased analog transmissions on April 16, 2009.
