= KCWV =

Television station in Duluth, Minnesota

- Duluth, Minnesota; United States
- Channels: Digital: 27 (UHF); Virtual: 27

Programming
- Affiliations: 27.1: TCT; for others, see § Subchannels

Ownership
- Owner: Total Christian Television; (Radiant Life Ministries, Inc.)

History
- Founded: December 6, 2006
- First air date: November 30, 2009
- Former affiliations: My Family TV (2009–2010); The Walk TV (2010–2013); AMGTV (2013–2020)
- Call sign meaning: Station launched with unrealized attempt at a CW affiliation

Technical information
- Licensing authority: FCC
- Facility ID: 166511
- ERP: 40 kW; 62.5 kW (CP)
- HAAT: 207 m (679 ft); 218.1 m (716 ft) (CP)
- Transmitter coordinates: 46°47′7″N 92°7′16″W
- Translator(s): K17OV-D Duluth; K30QX-D Duluth

Links
- Public license information: Public file; LMS
- Website: www.tct.tv

KCWV (channel 27) is a religious television station in Duluth, Minnesota, United States, owned by Total Christian Television (TCT). The station's transmitter is located on the former KDLH tower on Duluth's Observation Hill.

== History ==
The Federal Communications Commission (FCC) granted George S. Flinn III a construction permit for the digital-only station on channel 27 on December 6, 2006. The station signed on November 30, 2009.

Flinn is a Memphis businessman who, until 2007, owned Ion Television affiliates WPXX-TV in Memphis and WPXL-TV in New Orleans.

At its start, KCWV was affiliated with My Family TV. Within a year after the station debuted, it affiliated with Legacy TV, a small Christian broadcasting network. Towards the end of 2012, the religious network rebranded from Legacy TV to The Walk TV. During late October 2013, KCWV changed affiliations again to AMGTV, a family-oriented television network.

On September 17, 2014, it was announced that KCWV would be off the air for a couple of months, as its tower was undergoing replacement. It returned to the air on September 21, 2015, from a new, shorter tower. Since that point it has continued to broadcast intermittently, having been off the air from a period of the spring of 2018 until coming back in May 2019, continuing to carry AMGTV. The station has never sold local commercial advertising.

On May 28, 2020, Flinn Broadcasting Corporation announced that it would sell KCWV, along with sister stations WWJX in Jackson, Mississippi, WBIH in Selma, Alabama, and WFBD in Destin, Florida, to Marion, Illinois–based Total Christian Television for an undisclosed price. The sale was completed on September 15; the stations became owned-and-operated stations of the TCT network two days later.

== Subchannels ==
The station's signal is multiplexed:

Subchannels of KCWV
Channel	Res.	Short name	Programming
27.1	720p	KCWV HD	TCT
27.2	480i	SBN	SonLife
27.3	480i	ShopLC	Shop LC
27.4	480i	Bounce	Bounce TV
27.5	480i	Start	Start TV
27.6	480i	Buzzr	Buzzr
27.7	480i	GetTV	Great
27.8	480i	BizTV	Biz TV
27.9	480i	Toons	MeTV Toons
27.10	480i	Positiv	Positiv
27.11	480i	ONTV4U	OnTV4U
27.12	480i	GDT	Infomercials
