= KEDT =

Television station in Corpus Christi, Texas

- Corpus Christi, Texas; United States
- Channels: Digital: 23 (UHF); Virtual: 16
- Branding: KEDT

Programming
- Affiliations: 16.1: PBS; 16.2: Create

Ownership
- Owner: South Texas Public Broadcasting, Inc.
- Sister stations: KEDT-FM

History
- First air date: October 16, 1972
- Former channel numbers: Analog: 16 (UHF, 1972–2009)
- Call sign meaning: Corpus Christi Educational Television

Technical information
- Licensing authority: FCC
- Facility ID: 58408
- ERP: 50 kW
- HAAT: 270 m (886 ft)
- Transmitter coordinates: 27°39′21″N 97°33′56″W

Links
- Public license information: Public file; LMS
- Website: www.kedt.org

KEDT (channel 16) is a PBS member television station in Corpus Christi, Texas, United States. It is owned by South Texas Public Broadcasting alongside NPR members KEDT-FM (90.3 MHz) and KVRT (90.7 FM). The three outlets share studios at the KEDT Center for Educational Broadcasting on the campuses of Del Mar College on South Staples Street in Corpus Christi; the television station's transmitter is located near Petronila, Texas.

== History ==
KEDT was created by businessman Charles Butt to bring public television to south Texas. Butt, part of the family that founded the H-E-B supermarket chain, joined with Don Weber, another businessman, and the two approached the Corpus Christi business community with a proposal to start a local PBS television station. Others became interested, and soon formed a Board of Directors.

The station's original equipment were donations from KVVV-TV of Galveston, an independent station that had ceased operations in 1969. The original transmitter location was on a site donated by a local rancher. The original broadcast facilities were in an abandoned school building in town, and the original programming was provided by San Antonio PBS station KLRN via telephone cables. KEDT signed on the air on October 16, 1972. The station moved into its current facilities the following year.

KEDT was well received in the community; the station received additional funding from philanthropy. In 1980, South Texas Public Broadcasting System, the station's owner, applied for a low-power repeater station for Victoria that would have expanded KEDT's reach in South Texas. In addition, KEDT began to produce its own programming, supplementing PBS fare.

However, the Corpus Christi economy was heavily dependent on one industry that is subject to its fortunes and misfortunes. As the energy industry began to disappear in the mid- to late 1980s, so would the funding KEDT received in the late 1970s and early 1980s. Corporate and personal donations to the station all but vanished, and the locally produced programming did not generate enough revenue to meet the station's needs. Plans for the Victoria repeater were scrapped in late 1984. By the end of the 1980s, KEDT was deeply in debt.

The station began to recover in the 1990s through debt restructuring, aggressive cost-cutting, and revenue enhancement. KEDT outsourced many of its non-essential functions and began changing its programming. One such change was the addition of distance learning in conjunction with local educational establishments.

The advent of the new century brought new opportunities and challenges to KEDT. Digital television (DTV) has brought new financial burdens to the station, but also allowed for modernization. As of 2003, the station was still using some of its original equipment and transmitter from 1972, so DTV presented an opportunity to modernize. In addition, DTV has allowed the station to air even more programming.

== Helicopter crash ==
On January 16, 2008, a U.S. Navy MH 53 Sea Dragon helicopter crashed into KEDT's tower, killing three sailors, damaging the top 75 feet of the 1000-foot tower, including the beacon light and the antenna, and knocking the station off the air. KEDT resumed broadcasting the next day from auxiliary facilities at reduced power.

== Programming ==
KEDT carries programming similar to other PBS member stations.

KEDT produced several original programs for broadcast nationally on PBS. Of note is Lone Star, an eight-part series on the history of Texas, produced in honor of the Texas Sesquicentennial in 1986. It was hosted by Larry Hagman and continues to be requested by Texas schools for use in supplementing their Texas history courses. Another notable production was John Henry Faulk: The Man Who Beat the Blacklist, hosted by Bill Moyers and Studs Terkel. The documentary detailed the effects of McCarthyism on John Henry Faulk, a Texas radio broadcaster, and on the nation as a whole. Justice for My People: The Dr. Hector P. Garcia Story focused on Dr. Hector P. Garcia, a Mexican-born medical doctor from Corpus Christi, who was cherished by many thousands with whom he had contact. Other local programs included Liz Carpenter and the Good Old Boys and USS Lexington: Always Ready!, the latter a documentary about the World War II aircraft carrier that compiled the longest service record in the history of the United States Navy.

=== Challenge! ===
The second most watched show on KEDT (the most-watched being Antiques Roadshow) is the locally produced quiz bowl program Challenge!, where teams from local high schools compete in an academic quiz show hosted by Eric Boyd. 24 high schools begin in the competition in a single elimination tournament until there is only one team remaining. There is also a one-hour All Star Challenge! game, in which twelve top players from twelve different teams are selected to compete. Challenge! is funded by a number of local businesses and universities, and the top four teams and all competitors in the All-Star game receive scholarship money from Del Mar College and Texas A&M University–Corpus Christi.

== Technical information ==
=== Subchannels ===
The station's signal is multiplexed:

Subchannels of KEDT
Channel	Res.	Short name	Programming
16.1	1080i	KEDT-HD	PBS
16.2	480i	CREATE	Create

KEDT-DT was granted an original construction permit on August 20, 2001, to transmit on UHF channel 23. As with many other DTV facilities, KEDT-DT has not been able to build the facilities as quickly as planned, and the station has had to request several extensions of the construction permit. On April 30, 2003, the station was granted Special Temporary Authority (STA) to broadcast at reduced power to conserve financial resources. The STA has been extended several times, and the station has requested to make its temporary operations permanent, as its DTV signal coverage matches its analog signal coverage, and compares favorably with the DTV signal coverage of a local commercial television station that has already maximized its DTV signal.

=== Analog-to-digital conversion ===
KEDT shut down its analog signal, over UHF channel 16, on June 12, 2009, the official date on which full-power television stations in the United States transitioned from analog to digital broadcasts under federal mandate. The station's digital signal remained on its pre-transition UHF channel 23, using virtual channel 16.

== See also ==
- List of television stations in Texas
- Channel 23 digital TV stations in the United States
- Channel 16 virtual TV stations in the United States
