= Channel 16 virtual TV stations in the United States =

The following television stations operate on virtual channel 16 in the United States:

- K02RI-D in Cedar City Canyon, Utah
- K03IJ-D in College Station, Texas
- K04RV-D in Salina & Redmond, Utah
- K07ZE-D in Rural Juab, etc., Utah
- K10QR-D in Leamington, Utah
- K15LW-D in Utahn, Utah
- K15MY-D in Caputa, South Dakota
- K16AB-D in Guymon, Oklahoma
- K16BQ-D in Brainerd, Minnesota
- K16CG-D in St. James, Minnesota
- K16CT-D in Cortez, etc., Colorado
- K16DS-D in St. George, Utah
- K16FC-D in San Luis Obispo, California
- K16GZ-D in Durango, Colorado
- K16IW-D in Redding, California
- K16JJ-D in Eureka, California
- K16KA-D in Pueblo, Colorado
- K16KI-D in Bend, Oregon
- K16KM-D in Bemidji, Minnesota
- K16NN-D in Laredo, Texas
- K16NQ-D in Pocatello, Idaho
- K17MH-D in Cedar Falls, Iowa
- K18GX-D in Juab, Utah
- K18IV-D in Mount Pleasant, Utah
- K18NN-D in Globe, Arizona
- K19LU-D in Cedar City, Utah
- K19MF-D in East Carbon County, Utah
- K20KF-D in Davenport, Iowa
- K21JS-D in Harrison, Arkansas
- K21KF-D in Frost, Minnesota
- K21KL-D in Rural Beaver County, Utah
- K22MV-D in Teasdale, Utah
- K23JV-D in Green River, Utah
- K23NU-D in Richfield, etc., Utah
- K23OD-D in Scipio, Utah
- K23PG-D in Yakima, Washington
- K25PH-D in Roosevelt, Utah
- K25PM-D in Helper, Utah
- K26NE-D in Florence, Oregon
- K26NN-D in Bridger, etc., Montana
- K26OA-D in Parowan/Enoch/Paragonah, Utah
- K26OI-D in East Price, Utah
- K26OY-D in Malad City, Idaho
- K28KQ-D in Ferron, Utah
- K28KR-D in Huntington, Utah
- K28PH-D in Duchesne, Utah
- K28PN-D in Green River, Utah
- K28PR-D in Castle Dale, Utah
- K29IW-D in Clear Creek, Utah
- K30KJ-D in Manti & Ephrain, Utah
- K30KQ-D in Jackson, Minnesota
- K30PK-D in Kanarraville, etc., Utah
- K31AE-D in Sutherlin, Oregon
- K31LA-D in Fremont, Utah
- K33KF-D in Kanarraville, etc., Utah
- K33KI-D in Spring Glen, Utah
- K33OU-D in Fountain Green, Utah
- K35JH-D in London Springs, Oregon
- K35JI-D in Orangeville, Utah
- K35NV-D in Beryl/Newcastle/Modena, Utah
- K35NW-D in Beaver etc., Utah
- K35NX-D in Fillmore, etc., Utah
- K36NL-D in Cottage Grove, Oregon
- KADT-LD in Austin, Texas
- KAJL-LD in Fayetteville, Arkansas
- KBGS-TV in Billings, Montana
- KCGE in Crookston, Minnesota
- KDSD-TV in Aberdeen, South Dakota
- KDSO-LD in Medford, Oregon
- KEDT in Corpus Christi, Texas
- KEMS in Vernal, Utah
- KGSA-LD in San Antonio, Texas
- KHFD-LD in Dallas, Texas
- KHSC-LD in Fresno, California
- KIVY-LD in Crockett, Texas
- KJJC-TV in Great Falls, Montana
- KKIC-LD in Boise, Idaho
- KKTQ-LD in Cheyenne, Wyoming
- KLRT-TV in Little Rock, Arkansas
- KMRZ-LD in Pomona, California
- KMTR in Eugene, Oregon
- KONG in Everett, Washington
- KORS-CD in Portland, Oregon
- KPTB-DT in Lubbock, Texas
- KSCZ-LD in San Jose-San Francisco, California
- KSNF in Joplin, Missouri
- KSXE-LD in Sioux City, Iowa
- KTAJ-TV in St. Joseph, Missouri
- KUNP in La Grande, Oregon
- KUPT-LD in Albuquerque, New Mexico
- KUPX-TV in Provo, Utah
- KVAD-LD in Amarillo, Texas
- KZDN-LD in Denver, Colorado
- W07DC-D in Allentown/Bethlehem, Pennsylvania
- W10CP-D in Towanda, Pennsylvania
- W14CO-D in Clarks Summit, etc., Pennsylvania
- W15CO-D in Towanda, Pennsylvania
- W16CC-D in West Gate, Florida
- W16CL-D in Key West, Florida
- W16CW-D in Villalba, Puerto Rico
- W16CX-D in Panama City, Florida
- W16DN-D in Traverse City, Michigan
- W16EE-D in Augusta, Georgia
- W16EJ-D in Harrisburg, Pennsylvania
- W16EK-D in Douglas, Georgia
- W20AD-D in Williamsport, Pennsylvania
- W25ER-D in Vero Beach, Florida
- W25FI-D in Maplewood, Ohio
- W26CV-D in Mansfield, Pennsylvania
- W29FQ-D in Pottsville, Pennsylvania
- W33DN-D in Florence, South Carolina
- WANA-LD in Naples, Florida
- WAPT in Jackson, Mississippi
- WBOC-TV in Salisbury, Maryland
- WCEE-LD in Charlotte, North Carolina
- WCQA-LD in Springfield, Illinois
- WCUH-LD in Fort Wayne, Indiana
- WDRH-LD in Raleigh, North Carolina
- WGGS-TV in Greenville, South Carolina
- WGPX-TV in Burlington, North Carolina
- WHMR-LD in Homestead, Florida
- WINP-TV in Pittsburgh, Pennsylvania
- WJKT in Jackson, Tennessee
- WJWJ-TV in Beaufort, South Carolina
- WJYL-CD in Jeffersonville, Indiana
- WKBJ-LD in Live Oak, Florida
- WMWI-LD in Verona, Wisconsin
- WNCB-LD in Fayetteville, North Carolina
- WNDU-TV in South Bend, Indiana
- WNEP-TV in Scranton, Pennsylvania
- WOCX-LD in Reddick, Florida
- WPBI-LD in Lafayette, Indiana
- WPBS-TV in Watertown, New York
- WPTD in Dayton, Ohio
- WQHI-LD in Myrtle Beach, South Carolina
- WTJR in Quincy, Illinois
- WUSI-TV in Olney, Illinois
- WUSV-LD in Clarksburg, West Virginia
- WVAW-LD in Charlottesville, Virginia
- WWPI-LD in Presque Isle, Maine
- WYBU-CD in Columbus, Georgia
- WYGA-CD in Atlanta, Georgia
- WZTS-LD in Hinton, West Virginia

The following television stations, which are no longer licensed, formerly operated on virtual channel 16 in the United States:

- K16JC-D in Beaumont, Texas
- KIMD-LD in Lufkin, Texas
- W16CV-D in Parkersburg, West Virginia
- W19EB-D in Lumberton, Mississippi
- W36BE-D in State College, Pennsylvania
- WCYD-LD in Myrtle Beach, South Carolina
- WKMH-LD in Peoria, Illinois
