= KEDT-FM =

Public radio station in Corpus Christi, Texas

Coordinates: 27.654°N 97.566°W

Corpus Christi, Texas; United States
- Frequency: 90.3 MHz
- Branding: KEDT Public Radio

Programming
- Format: Public radio (classical music; news–talk)
- Affiliations: National Public Radio

Ownership
- Owner: South Texas Public Broadcasting System
- Sister stations: KEDT

History
- First air date: March 2, 1982
- Former call signs: KKED (1982–1993)
- Call sign meaning: "Educational Television" (derived from sister station KEDT)

Technical information
- Licensing authority: FCC
- Facility ID: 61172
- Class: C1
- ERP: KEDT-FM: 100,000 watts KVRT: 30,000 watts
- HAAT: KEDT-FM: 244 meters (801 ft); KVRT: 100 meters (330 ft)
- Translator: KVRT: 102.1 K271CL (Victoria)
- Repeater: 90.7 KVRT (Victoria)

Links
- Public license information: Public file; LMS
- Webcast: Listen Live
- Website: kedt.org

KEDT-FM (90.3 MHz) branded as "KEDT Public Radio," is a non-commercial FM public radio station in Corpus Christi, Texas. It is owned by The South Texas Public Broadcasting System, which also owns PBS station KEDT. KEDT-FM airs news programming from NPR in morning and afternoon drive time and several hours on weekends. The rest of the schedule is made up of classical music, with jazz and other genres on weekends. Programming is simulcast on KVRT 90.7 FM in Victoria.

KEDT-FM is a Class C1 station. It has an effective radiated power (ERP) of 100,000 watts, the maximum for most stations. The transmitter is in Petronila, southwest of Corpus Christi. KEDT-FM broadcasts using HD Radio technology. Its HD2 subchannel carries a mostly news-talk format of spoken word shows from NPR, the Public Radio Exchange and the BBC World Service.

== History ==
The station signed on the air on March 2, 1982. Its original call sign was KKED-FM. The studios were on South Padre Island Drive. Then, as now, it aired some news programs from NPR with classical and other genres of music heard the rest of the day.

In 1993, it changed its callsign to KEDT-FM to match that of sister station KEDT channel 16. Also in 1993, it began simulcasting on 90.7 KVRT to provide Victoria-area listeners with public radio programming. There have also been talks to launch a simulcast station in the McAllen - Brownsville area, which has no NPR affiliate, but those plans have not been put into place.

== See also ==
- KEDT (TV)
