= WKAB-TV =

Television station in Mobile, Alabama (1952–1954)

- Mobile, Alabama; United States
- Channels: Analog: 48 (UHF)

Programming
- Affiliations: CBS, DuMont

Ownership
- Owner: Pursley Broadcasting Service, Inc.

History
- First air date: December 29, 1952
- Last air date: August 2, 1954; (1 year, 216 days)

Technical information
- ERP: 270 kW
- HAAT: 96 m (316 ft)

WKAB-TV (channel 48) was a television station in Mobile, Alabama, United States. It was the first television station to broadcast in Mobile, operating from December 1952 to August 1954. As a UHF television station it was at a severe competitive disadvantage to the VHF station—WALA-TV—which started up in Mobile at the same time causing WKAB-TV to lose money and eventually fold.

== History ==
The Pursley Broadcasting Service, owners of Mobile independent radio station WKAB (840 AM), received a construction permit for a new channel 48 television station in Mobile on August 6, 1952. Construction began nearly immediately at the studio site in the Toulminville neighborhood of Mobile.

When WKAB-TV's construction permit was issued, radio station WALA had been granted a construction permit for channel 10, and channel 5 was between radio stations WKRG and WABB. As Christmas approached, both WKAB-TV and WALA-TV were rapidly approaching air, with channel 48 receiving the first 100-watt UHF transmitter made by General Electric. WALA, however, became bogged down in delays, and WKAB-TV became the fifth operating UHF television station and 15th new outlet to sign on after the end of the lifting of the 1948 TV freeze when it began telecasting on December 29, 1952. WALA-TV joined it on January 14, 1953. WKAB-TV was an affiliate of CBS and the DuMont Television Network; it was not interconnected to network coaxial cables, so all network shows would have aired on kinescopes.

WKAB-TV initially operated on reduced power at 22.6 kW ERP until August 1, 1953, when it stepped up to its full authorized power of 270,000 watts. This improved reception in some outlying areas of channel 48's coverage pattern, such as Pensacola, Florida.

On July 30, 1954, Channel 48 announced that it would go silent, intended as a temporary measure, on August 2. At the time, it was announced that there were plans to return the station to air when microwave service for network programming was available. However, Pursley was in heavy debt from the television station, which had been unable to compete with the VHF WALA-TV. After the company became unable to pay its bills, it (and WKAB radio, which continued to operate) was sold to the owners of radio advertising firm Dwight and Associates in 1957.

The end of channel 48's telecasts, however, was not immediately the end of the WKAB-TV story, as in 1955 one buyer expressed interest in the facility. That prospective owner was George Mayoral, who owned UHF television station WJMR-TV in New Orleans. In May 1955, Mayoral announced that he was considering the purchase of the WKAB-TV facility and was in arrangements to buy the silent Houston UHF outlet KNUZ-TV, with plans to operate the trio as a network specializing in Hispanic and African American programming. However, neither purchase materialized, and the station was deleted on February 28, 1956.

The channel 48 frequency is now occupied by TCT affiliate WFBD.
