= WMCF-TV =

Television station in Montgomery, Alabama

- Montgomery, Alabama; United States
- Channels: Digital: 28 (UHF); Virtual: 45

Programming
- Affiliations: 45.1: TBN; for others, see § Subchannels

Ownership
- Owner: Trinity Broadcasting Network; (Trinity Broadcasting of Texas, Inc.)

History
- First air date: 1985 (Note: The Broadcasting and Cable Yearbook says October 12, while the Television and Cable Factbook says November 25.)
- Former channel numbers: Analog: 45 (UHF, 1985–2009); Digital: 46 (UHF, 2006–2020)
- Former affiliations: Independent (1985–1990)

Technical information
- Licensing authority: FCC
- Facility ID: 60829
- ERP: 725 kW
- HAAT: 130 m (427 ft)
- Transmitter coordinates: 32°24′13″N 86°11′49″W

Links
- Public license information: Public file; LMS
- Website: www.tbn.org

WMCF-TV (channel 45) is a religious television station in Montgomery, Alabama, United States, owned by the Trinity Broadcasting Network (TBN). The station's transmitter is located near Sevenmile Creek, on the east side of Montgomery.

The station formerly operated from a studio located on Mendel Parkway West in Montgomery. That facility was one of several closed by TBN in 2019 following the Federal Communications Commission (FCC)'s repeal of the "Main Studio Rule", which required full-service television stations like WMCF-TV to maintain facilities in or near their communities of license.

== History ==
WMCF-TV was signed-on in 1985 by Word of God Fellowship, Inc., the future parent organization of the Daystar Television Network. It has broadcast Christian television programs for the entirety of its existence, and this continued following subsequent sales of the station: in 1990 to Sonlight Broadcasting Systems, which owned WMPV-TV in Mobile; and in 1997 to All American TV (not to be confused with an unrelated television syndication company of a similar name), a minority-owned firm with close ties to TBN, who already owned WTJP-TV in Gadsden. WMCF had been airing many TBN programs, and the sale to All American made the station a full-fledged affiliate of the network.

WMCF became a TBN owned-and-operated station in 2000, when TBN purchased all of All American's stations.

== Subchannels ==
The station's signal is multiplexed:

Subchannels of WMCF-TV
| Channel | Res. | Short name | Programming |
|---|---|---|---|
| 45.1 | 720p | TBN HD | TBN |
| 45.2 | 720p | TVDEALS | Infomercials |
| 45.3 | 480i | Inspire | TBN Inspire |
| 45.4 | 480i | ONTV4U | OnTV4U (infomercials) |
| 45.5 | 480i | POSITIV | Positiv |

TBN-owned full-power stations permanently ceased analog transmissions on April 16, 2009. The station's digital signal remained on its pre-transition UHF channel 46, using virtual channel 45.
