= Florida Public Broadcasting Service =

Consortium of broadcasters

Florida Public Broadcasting Service Inc
- Abbreviation: FPBS
- Nickname: Florida Public Media
- Formation: Tax-exempt since October 1981; 44 years ago
- Type: 501(c)(3)
- Headquarters: St. Petersburg, Florida
- Revenue: 4,817,856 USD (2024)
- Expenses: 4,753,536 USD (2024)
- Website: floridapublicmedia.org

Florida Public Broadcasting Service (FPBS) is a non-profit organization representing Florida's PBS television and NPR radio stations. FPBS works with PBS and NPR member stations, along with state and local groups, to deliver education-based outreach projects and provide high-quality programming." FPBS has a total of 14 member stations that cover 99% of Florida viewers, as well as some viewers in Georgia and Alabama.

== History ==
The Public Broadcasting Act of 1967 established The Corporation for Public Broadcasting, defined its board and purpose, and appropriated funding. This stemmed from a failed amendment of the Communications Act of 1934 that attempted to reserve 25% of the radio airwaves for educational nonprofit usage and a 1945 decision by the Federal Communications Commission to set aside 20 of 100 FM channels for noncommercial radio.

=== Legislative Act ===
In 1973 the Legislature created the Florida Public Broadcasting Program System as described in 73–293, Laws of Florida. The system is administered by the Department of Education pursuant to rules adopted by the State Board of Education. The System’s purpose is to maintain high-quality broadcasting capability for public television stations and public radio stations. The stations which compose the system are licensed by the Federal Communications Commission to local communities, school boards, community colleges, or the Board of Regents. State funding is provided to assist qualified public broadcasting stations with operations, equipment, production, and program distribution, construction of station facilities, and a statewide interconnection system.

=== Today in the Legislature ===
In 1973, "Florida Public Broadcasting" (FPB), a joint venture between WJCT-TV (Jacksonville) and WFSU-TV (Tallahassee) began program coverage of the Florida Legislature, which was transmitted to and broadcast by the eight affiliated PBS television stations in Florida, from a mobile facility located on the grounds of the State Capitol. The program was called Today in the Legislature, and was the first of its kind in the United States, preceding Legislative programs in other states, and U.S. Congressional coverage by C-SPAN.

Reaction to the first year of Today in the Legislature was positive. The state legislature dedicated funds to expand the program, managed exclusively by WJCT-TV. Production facilities were moved inside the (old) Capitol building, with engineering and studio facilities constructed on the third floor. The first broadcast from the new facility was on April 2, 1974. Today In The Legislature became a 60-minute program produced Monday through Friday during the legislative session, with a one-hour Spanish language summary, Hoy en la Legislatura produced on Fridays. There was also a weekly sign language program. The first year, the program was anchored by Elizabeth "Bib" Willis, with George Meyer, a veteran newspaper writer. Beginning the second year, the on-air talent was provided by veteran broadcaster Jim Lewis, with additional scripts and interviews by Elizabeth "Bib" Willis. Research, engineering, and production crews were composed chiefly of recent graduates from the FSU Department of Communications, now Florida State University College of Motion Picture, Television, and Recording Arts, nearly all under the age of 25, including Producer Elliott C. Mitchell, Director John P. Leu, and future Georgia Legislator Chesley V. Morton, as still photographer and cameraman. Today in the Legislature was described as a "unique blend of television of record and more conventional news coverage. A research study concluded that Today in the Legislature generated more positive attitudes about the legislature and increased political knowledge in adolescents who viewed the broadcast, although only 12% found the programming to be "interesting".

== Controversy ==
The member stations of Florida Public Broadcasting receive national and state funding, as well as contributions from local businesses, viewers, and listeners. This funding goes toward broadcasting local programming, as well as programming from PBS, NPR, CPB, BBC, ITV, and others.

In May 2011, Florida Governor Rick Scott vetoed $4.8 Million from Public Broadcasting, claiming that it is an unnecessary investment towards a special interest group. The cut slashed funding from thirteen radio stations by an average amount of $61,715 and all Florida Public Television Stations by an average of $307,447. Some critics questioned Scott's use of "special interest" for a medium that promotes arts, education, and news with the intention to "deliver education-based outreach projects and provide high-quality programming…[with the mission of] strengthen[ing the] community, empower[ing] families and…educat[ing] the public".

These cuts emphasized the role of the executive branch in policy-making and legislative advocacy. Despite a multitude of petitions against the decision (26,000 on at least one) and a State Senate Funding guarantee, the veto ultimately won. This also came as a shock to the public broadcasting stations that saw the Senate approve a continuation of funding in 2010 and 2011, as well as perplexing to those curious as to how Public Broadcasting could be lumped into the same category as other special interest groups.

The initial intention of creating a non-private sector of radio was to create an alternative to the corporate interests of the private radio sector.
