= WDPM-DT =

Television station in Mobile, Alabama

- Mobile, Alabama; Pensacola, Florida; United States
- City: Mobile, Alabama
- Channels: Digital: 23 (UHF); Virtual: 18

Programming
- Affiliations: 18.1: Daystar; 18.2: Daystar Español; 18.3: Daystar Reflections

Ownership
- Owner: Daystar Television Network; (Word of God Fellowship, Inc.)

History
- First air date: February 2009
- Former channel number: Virtual: 4 (2009–2010)
- Call sign meaning: Daystar Pensacola Mobile

Technical information
- Licensing authority: FCC
- Facility ID: 83740
- ERP: 390 kW
- HAAT: 533.6 m (1,751 ft)
- Transmitter coordinates: 30°36′41″N 87°36′26.4″W

Links
- Public license information: Public file; LMS
- Website: www.daystar.com

WDPM-DT (channel 18) is a religious television station licensed to Mobile, Alabama, United States, serving southwest Alabama and northwest Florida. The station is owned by the Daystar Television Network. WDPM-DT's transmitter is located near Robertsdale, Alabama.

== History ==
The station signed on after the analog signal of PBS member station WSRE (channel 23) signed off for the last time on February 17, 2009.

Since the "channel 23.1" series of virtual channel designations already identifies the existing PBS station's digital subchannels, this numbering sequence would not be available to the new station. According to the ATSC standard, WDPM-DT's channel numbers would therefore need to be displayed using numbering based on WSRE's digital channel number, 31. From sign-on until February 2010, the station displayed as channel 4.1, which is considered a violation of these standards.

== Subchannels ==
The station's signal is multiplexed:

Subchannels of WDPM-DT
Subchannel	Res.	Short name	Programming
18.1	1080i	WDPM-DT	Daystar
18.2	720p	WDPM-ES	Daystar Español
18.3	480i	WDPM-SD	Daystar Reflections
