= WPXL-TV =

Television station in New Orleans

- New Orleans, Louisiana; United States
- Channels: Digital: 33 (UHF); Virtual: 49

Programming
- Affiliations: 49.1: Ion Television; for others, see § Subchannels

Ownership
- Owner: Ion Media; (Ion Media License Company, LLC)

History
- First air date: March 19, 1989
- Former call signs: WCCL (1989–1998)
- Former channel numbers: Analog: 49 (UHF, 1989–2009); Digital: 50 (UHF, until 2020)
- Former affiliations: Independent (1989–1990); CBS (secondary, 1989–1990); Dark (1990–1994); HSN (1994–1998)
- Call sign meaning: "Pax Louisiana"

Technical information
- Licensing authority: FCC
- Facility ID: 21729
- ERP: 1,000 kW
- HAAT: 311.2 m (1,021 ft)
- Transmitter coordinates: 29°58′58″N 89°56′58″W

Links
- Public license information: Public file; LMS
- Website: iontelevision.com

WPXL-TV (channel 49) is a television station in New Orleans, Louisiana, United States, broadcasting the Ion Television network. It is owned by the Ion Media subsidiary of the E. W. Scripps Company, and maintains offices on Veterans Memorial Boulevard and Cleary Avenue in Metairie; its transmitter is located off Paris Road (LA 47) near the Orleans–St. Bernard parish line.

== History ==
=== Early history ===
After a string of delays, channel 49 first signed on the air on March 19, 1989, as WCCL; it originally operated as an independent station with a general entertainment format, along with numerous CBS programs preempted by WWL-TV (channel 4), including CBS This Morning. Owned by Black woman Barbara Lamont, WCCL failed to show in the ratings with poor programming and a lack of cable carriage. By the end of 1989, it had filed Chapter 11 bankruptcy due to a hostile creditor that sought to evict it from its tower at Algiers. The station had begun work on its own tower at Bywater which would prevent blockage of channel 49's signal by passing ships on the Mississippi River, but a battle with neighbors who wanted its height reduced left the site unfinished and unusable by the station. The hostile creditor—Lodestar Towers—was successful in obtaining an order to repossess WCCL's equipment, forcing the station off the air on May 23, 1990.

While Lamont spent two years trying to rebuild the station's transmitter facility elsewhere, she gave up in May 1992, when her Chapter 11 reorganization case was converted to Chapter 7 liquidation. Flinn Broadcasting Corporation purchased the station's license out of bankruptcy and returned channel 49 to the air on May 25, 1994, carrying programming from the Home Shopping Network.

The station changed its call letters to WPXL-TV on August 31, 1998; that same day, the station became a charter affiliate of the family-oriented network Pax TV (now Ion Television). As part of the affiliation deal with Pax TV, Flinn Broadcasting entered into a time brokerage agreement with Pax TV owner Paxson Communications to operate the station. On July 30, 2001. Paxson entered into a joint sales agreement with Hearst-Argyle Television (now Hearst Television), owner of NBC affiliate WDSU (channel 6), to provide advertising and marketing services for WPXL.

=== Hurricane Katrina ===
In early September 2005, shortly after Hurricane Katrina made landfall in southern Louisiana, WPXL partnered with WDSU, whose transmitter building in Chalmette was damaged due to flooding caused by the storm, to simulcast channel 6's programming. The station also added programming from The Worship Network and the signals of the Tribune Broadcasting-owned duopoly of ABC affiliate WGNO (channel 26) and CW affiliate WNOL-TV (channel 38) as subchannels on its digital signal for New Orleans area residents that had television sets with built-in digital tuners.

On March 29, 2008, almost a month after WGNO and WNOL resumed digital transmissions over WNOL's digital allocation on UHF channel 15, WPXL began to carry the Ion-owned children's network Qubo and lifestyle network Ion Life on digital channels 49.2 and 49.3; both networks had launched a year-and-a-half after Katrina hit the area.

=== Sale to Ion Media ===
On August 21, 2007, Ion Media announced that it would purchase WPXL-TV and Memphis sister station WPXX from Flinn Broadcasting outright for $18 million. The sale was completed on January 2, 2008, with WPXL becoming an Ion owned-and-operated station.

== Newscasts ==
In September 2001, as part of the JSA with that station, WPXL began airing tape delayed rebroadcasts of NBC affiliate WDSU's 10 p.m. newscasts each Monday through Friday evening at 10:30 p.m. (beginning shortly before that program's live broadcast ended on WDSU). The news share agreement ended on June 30, 2005 (coinciding with Pax's rebranding as i: Independent Television), due to Paxson Communications' decision to discontinue carriage of network affiliate newscasts as a result of Pax TV's financial troubles.

== Technical information ==
=== Subchannels ===
The station's signal is multiplexed:

Subchannels of WPXL-TV
Subchannel	Res.	Short name	Programming
49.1	720p	ION	Ion Television
49.2	720p	Grit	Grit
49.3	480i	CourtTV	Court TV
49.4	480i	IONPLus	Ion Plus
49.5	480i	BUSTED	Busted
49.6	480i	HSN	HSN
49.7	480i	QVC	QVC
49.8	480i	QVC365	QVC 365

=== Analog-to-digital conversion ===
WPXL shut down its analog signal, over UHF channel 49, on June 12, 2009, the official date on which full-power television stations in the United States transitioned from analog to digital broadcasts under federal mandate. The station's digital signal continued to broadcast on its pre-transition UHF channel 50, using virtual channel 49.
