= WPXX-TV =

Television station in Memphis, Tennessee

- Memphis, Tennessee; United States
- Channels: Digital: 33 (UHF); Virtual: 50

Programming
- Affiliations: 50.1: Ion Television; for others, see § Subchannels

Ownership
- Owner: Inyo Broadcast Holdings (sale to the E. W. Scripps Company pending); (Inyo Broadcast Licenses LLC)

History
- Founded: July 12, 1990
- First air date: December 31, 1994
- Former call signs: WXJP (1990–1992); WFBI (1992–1998)
- Former channel numbers: Analog: 50 (UHF, 1994–2009); Digital: 51 (UHF, 2009–2018)
- Former affiliations: HSN (1994–1998); MyNetworkTV (secondary, 2006–2009)
- Call sign meaning: Pax TV (former name of Ion Television), "X" to disambiguate from other stations

Technical information
- Licensing authority: FCC
- Facility ID: 21726
- ERP: 537 kW
- HAAT: 312 m (1,024 ft)
- Transmitter coordinates: 35°12′41″N 89°48′54″W

Links
- Public license information: Public file; LMS
- Website: iontelevision.com

WPXX-TV (channel 50) is a television station in Memphis, Tennessee, United States, affiliated with Ion Television. Owned by Inyo Broadcast Holdings, WPXX-TV maintains studios and transmitter facilities on Brother Boulevard in Bartlett, Tennessee. The station also serves as the de facto Ion outlet for the Jackson, Tennessee, and Jonesboro, Arkansas, markets.

== History ==
The station first signed on the air on December 31, 1994, under the call letters WFBI; it was owned by Flinn Broadcasting, a company owned by Memphis businessman, radiologist (and later Shelby County commissioner) George Flinn. The station initially aired programming from the Home Shopping Network, until Paxson Communications (now Ion Media) began operating the station under a local marketing agreement in 1998, when the station became a charter affiliate of the upstart Pax TV network (now Ion Television). During this time, the station also carried rebroadcasts of some WMC-TV newscasts. The station also carried a selected slate of Memphis Grizzlies games produced by Fox Sports Southeast from the team's inception until sometime in the late 2000s.

On February 22, 2006, News Corporation announced the launch of a new "sixth" network called MyNetworkTV, which would be operated by Fox Television Stations and its syndication division Twentieth Television. MyNetworkTV was created to compete against another upstart network that would launch at the same time that September, The CW (an amalgamated network that originally consisted primarily of UPN and The WB's higher-rated programs) as well as to give UPN and WB stations not selected for The CW another option besides converting to independent stations. Although WLMT (channel 30) had served as the market's UPN and WB affiliates, the MyNetworkTV affiliation instead went to WPXX, which officially joined the network (as a secondary affiliation) on September 5, 2006, branding itself as "My50 Memphis".

In mid-August 2007, Ion Media announced that it would purchase WPXX and WPXL-TV in New Orleans outright from Flinn Broadcasting for $18 million. The sale was approved by the Federal Communications Commission and was completed on January 2, 2008.

On September 28, 2009, WPXX dropped MyNetworkTV programming as the network converted to a syndicated programming service. CW affiliate WLMT picked up WWE SmackDown (which it aired on Saturday evenings, rather than on its recommended Friday night timeslot), declining to run the remainder of MyNetworkTV's schedule. That lasted until SmackDown moved to the Syfy cable channel in October 2010, at which point WLMT's second digital subchannel picked up the full MyNetworkTV lineup while Retro Television Network programming (which would be dropped in November 2011 in favor of MeTV) outside of prime time.

== Technical information ==
=== Subchannels ===
The station's signal is multiplexed:

Subchannels of WPXX-TV
Subchannel	Res.	Short name	Programming
50.1	720p	ION	Ion Television
50.2	480i	CourtTV	Court TV
50.3	480i	Grit	Grit
50.4	480i	IONPlus	Ion Plus
50.5	480i	BUSTED	Busted
50.6	480i	GameSho	Game Show Central
50.7	480i	HSN	HSN
50.8	480i	QVC	QVC
50.9	480i	QVC2	QVC2

=== Analog-to-digital conversion ===
WPXX-TV ended regular programming on its analog signal, over UHF channel 50, on June 12, 2009, as part of the federally mandated transition from analog to digital television. The station's digital signal remained on its pre-transition UHF channel 51, using virtual channel 50.

As part of the SAFER Act, WPXX kept its analog signal on the air until June 26 to inform viewers of the digital television transition through a loop of public service announcements from the National Association of Broadcasters.
