= WBIH =

Television station in Selma, Alabama

- Selma–Montgomery, Alabama; United States
- City: Selma, Alabama
- Channels: Digital: 34 (UHF); Virtual: 29

Programming
- Affiliations: 29.1: TCT; for others, see § Subchannels

Ownership
- Owner: Tri-State Christian Television; (Radiant Life Ministries, Inc.)

History
- First air date: 2001
- Former channel numbers: Analog: 29 (UHF, 2001–2006); Digital: 29 (UHF, 2006–2020)
- Former affiliations: The Walk TV (until 2020)

Technical information
- Licensing authority: FCC
- Facility ID: 84802
- ERP: 1,000 kW
- HAAT: 404 m (1,325 ft)
- Transmitter coordinates: 32°32′26.7″N 86°50′32.7″W

Links
- Public license information: Public file; LMS
- Website: www.tct.tv

WBIH (channel 29) is a religious television station licensed to Selma, Alabama, United States, serving the Montgomery area. The station is owned by Tri-State Christian Television (TCT). WBIH's transmitter is located in unincorporated western Autauga County.

== History ==
The station was founded in 2001.

On May 28, 2020, Flinn Broadcasting Corporation announced that it would sell WBIH, along with sister stations KCWV in Duluth, Minnesota, WWJX in Jackson, Mississippi, and WFBD in Destin, Florida, to Marion, Illinois–based Tri-State Christian Television for an undisclosed price. The sale was completed on September 15; the stations became owned-and-operated stations of the TCT network two days later, with WBIH becoming the second religious television station in the Montgomery area. (Religious programming was first offered by WMCF-TV when that station switched to the Trinity Broadcasting Network in 1986.)

== Technical information ==
=== Subchannels ===
The station's signal is multiplexed:

Subchannels of WBIH
| Channel | Res. | Short name | Programming |
|---|---|---|---|
| 29.1 | 1080i | WBIH HD | TCT |
| 29.2 | 480i | SBN | SonLife |
| 29.3 | 480i | ShopLC | Shop LC |
| 29.4 | 480i | CTVMyst | Ion Mystery |
| 29.5 | 480i | ONTV4U | OnTV4U (4:3) |
| 29.6 | 480i | JTV | Jewelry TV |

=== Analog-to-digital conversion ===
WBIH shut down its analog signal, over UHF channel 29, on May 22, 2006. The station "flash-cut" its digital signal into operation UHF channel 29. Because it was granted an original construction permit after the FCC finalized the DTV allotment plan on April 21, 1997. The station did not receive a companion channel for a digital television station.
