= WDTI =

Television station in Indianapolis

- Indianapolis, Indiana; United States
- Channels: Digital: 23 (UHF); Virtual: 69

Programming
- Affiliations: 69.1: Daystar; 69.2: Daystar Español; 69.3: Daystar Reflections

Ownership
- Owner: Word of God Fellowship; (Indianapolis Community Television, Inc.)

History
- First air date: June 8, 1988
- Former call signs: WBUU (1988–1991); WTBU (1991–2004)
- Former channel numbers: Analog: 69 (UHF, 1988–2009); Digital: 44 (UHF, until 2019)
- Former affiliations: Educational Independent (1988–1992); PBS (1992–2004)
- Call sign meaning: "Daystar Television Indianapolis"

Technical information
- Licensing authority: FCC
- Facility ID: 7908
- ERP: 18.2 kW
- HAAT: 293 m (961 ft)
- Transmitter coordinates: 39°53′39.2″N 86°12′20.5″W

Links
- Public license information: Public file; LMS
- Website: www.daystar.com

WDTI (channel 69) is a religious television station in Indianapolis, Indiana, United States. The station is owned by the Daystar Television Network through its subsidiary Indianapolis Community Television. WDTI's offices are located on Crawfordsville Road in northwestern Indianapolis (near Speedway), and its transmitter is located on Walnut Drive, also on the city's northwest side (near Meridian Hills). Daystar also separately operates a low-power television station in Indianapolis, WIPX-LD (channel 51).

== History ==
Channel 69 first signed on the air on June 6, 1988, as WBUU, an educational independent station founded by Butler University. It changed its call letters to WTBU in 1991.

In 1992, WTBU joined PBS as its fourth member station in the Indianapolis market—after WFYI (channel 20), Bloomington-based WTIU (channel 30) and Muncie-licensed WIPB (channel 49); through PBS' Program Differentiation Plan, a fraction of the network's programming was distributed between all four stations, with WFYI carrying most of PBS' programs as the primary PBS outlet for the market. In 2004, Butler University sold WTBU to Indianapolis Community Television, Inc., an arm of the Daystar Television Network. The new owners began carrying programming from the religious broadcast network.

== Technical information ==
=== Subchannels ===
Subchannels of WDTI
| Subchannel | Res. | Short name | Programming |
|---|---|---|---|
| 69.1 | 1080i | WDTI-DT | Daystar |
| 69.2 | 720p | WDTI-ES | Daystar Español |
| 69.3 | 480i | WDTI-SD | Daystar Reflections |

=== Analog-to-digital conversion ===
WDTI shut down its analog signal, over UHF channel 69, on November 10, 2008. The station's digital signal remained on its pre-transition UHF channel 44, using virtual channel 69.
