= WSRE =

Television station in Pensacola, Florida

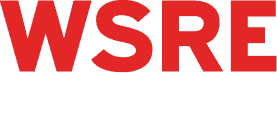
- Pensacola, Florida; Mobile, Alabama; United States
- City: Pensacola, Florida
- Channels: Digital: 24 (UHF); Virtual: 23
- Branding: WSRE

Programming
- Affiliations: 23.1: Educational independent

Ownership
- Owner: Pensacola State College; (The District Board of Trustees, PSC)

History
- Founded: 1967
- First air date: September 11, 1967
- Former channel numbers: Analog: 23 (UHF, 1967–2009); Digital: 31 (UHF, 2001–2019)
- Former affiliations: NET (1967–1970); PBS (1970–2026)
- Call sign meaning: Santa Rosa and Escambia counties

Technical information
- Licensing authority: FCC
- Facility ID: 17611
- ERP: 859 kW
- HAAT: 551.6 m (1,810 ft)
- Transmitter coordinates: 30°36′41″N 87°36′26.4″W

Links
- Public license information: Public file; LMS
- Website: www.pensacolastate.edu/wsre/

WSRE (channel 23) is an educational independent television station in Pensacola, Florida, United States. It is owned by Pensacola State College (PSC), with studios located at the Kugelman Center for Telecommunications on the Pensacola State main campus on College Boulevard and its transmitter near Robertsdale, Alabama.

WSRE went on the air in 1967 under the ownership of the Escambia County board of education. Its transmitter and studios were located at what was then known as Pensacola Junior College, and it provided instructional television and production services for local K-12 schools and the junior college as well as evening programming from National Educational Television, later supplanted by PBS. The college became the licensee in 1971, after Florida state law moved junior colleges under the control of the State Board of Education. In 1991, the WSRE-TV Foundation was established to provide financial support and administration. In addition to a range of local programming, WSRE has provided public telecommunications and other services, including a radio reading service. The station left PBS in 2026, after PSC voted in 2025 to end its membership and decertify its relationship with the WSRE Foundation.

== History ==
The Board of Public Instruction of Escambia County, Florida, applied on May 24, 1965, for a construction permit to build a new non-commercial television station in Pensacola. The station was initially allocated channel 21, but this was changed to channel 23 before the permit was granted on May 10, 1966. Though Pensacola was among the last population centers in the state to receive educational television, it already had suitable studio facilities at Pensacola Junior College (PJC), which would administer the new station. The Pensacola educational television system had begun as a closed-circuit setup at Ferry Pass Junior High School in 1963 before moving to PJC; it was already broadcasting closed-circuit programming on the college campus and one educational series for elementary school students on Pensacola commercial station WEAR-TV.

WSRE began broadcasting on September 11, 1967. The station offered courses for K-12 students, junior college courses, and programming from National Educational Television (NET). These programs served as the core of channel 23's offerings; for instance, a fourth-grade science class that was offered in 1968 featured a chimpanzee from the Pensacola Zoo and was accompanied by a 60-page booklet for teachers. The station operated only on weekdays until April 1969, when it was able to add programming on Saturdays and Sundays. NET was supplanted by PBS in October 1970.

In 1971, WSRE obtained equipment to begin broadcasting in color. That August, the Escambia County school board transferred the license to Pensacola Junior College; the change was described as a "paper transfer" and followed a reorganization that moved junior colleges from the jurisdiction of county school systems to the State Board of Education. The school board ceased providing an appropriation for channel 23 after the 1972–73 school year.

WSRE debuted a new local series, Gourmet Cooking with chef Earl Peyroux, in 1977. The program, originally ordered for 13 episodes, began national syndication to other public television stations in 1982 and was in production with new episodes as late as 1996, even though Peyroux had to take a two-year break to battle throat cancer.

In 1988, the station became one of the first ten PBS stations to be equipped to broadcast multiple audio channels and thus to participate in a trial of Descriptive Video Service (DVS) audio description. The ten trial stations and PBS itself shared an Emmy Award in 1990 for their efforts; by 1991, there were 55 DVS-capable PBS stations. Using the technology, WSRE also launched a radio reading service, Sightline, which operated from 1992 to 2011. WSRE discontinued operation of Sightline when Florida cut all public broadcasting funding and had to lay off five people; production responsibilities were then assumed by public radio station WUWF. Another service offered by the station was local cable channel "WLNE" (Where Learning Never Ends), which offered telecourses from 1997 to 2008.

The Kugelman Center for Telecommunications, which houses WSRE's studios, was completed in 1994. It is named for Jack and Jane Kugelman, whose gift helped finance the construction of the $10 million complex. The Kugelmans made a second major gift that financed the construction of a digital transmitter for the station; WSRE built its digital transmitter in Baldwin County, Alabama, in 2001, increasing its coverage area to include Mobile. In 2005, the station opened the Jean and Paul Amos Performance Studio; the donor was the founder of insurer Aflac and his wife. The studio boasted seating for 650 people as well as digital equipment. Another studio at the station was used for the production of MSNBC's Scarborough Country when its host, former representative Joe Scarborough, was in Pensacola.

In 2010, Pensacola Junior College was renamed Pensacola State College in anticipation of adding four-year degrees to its offerings.

=== Disaffiliation from PBS and foundation–college dispute ===
On September 16, 2025, following cuts in state and federal funding, the Pensacola State College board of trustees voted to end WSRE's affiliation with PBS the following year; the station became an educational independent on July 1, 2026. The trustees also voted to decertify the station's relationship with the WSRE Foundation and retain half the positions as direct components of Pensacola State College. Zack Smith cited the move as a reset in institutional support for WSRE that it believed had become unsustainable. Shortly after, the president of Pensacola State College, Ed Meadows, wrote to the foundation requesting that it dissolve and transfer all assets to the college. The foundation refused and began exploring alternative opportunities to provide programming in the Pensacola area.

On December 11, 2025, the WSRE Foundation filed a federal lawsuit to prevent Pensacola State College from taking control of foundation funds that support the station. The foundation argued that the college's move was intended to follow in politically minded efforts to discontinue support of public broadcasting and restricted the foundation's speech.

== Funding ==
In 2021–2022, WSRE had a total revenue of $4.625 million. A total of 4,503 contributors and members donated $461,000, or 10 percent, of the total. The Corporation for Public Broadcasting provided $1.11 million, most of that in the form of a Community Service Grant. Pensacola State College provided another $1.18 million, while $1.36 million of income came from a one-time insurance reimbursement.

== Local programming ==
Local programs produced by WSRE as of 2022 included community affairs show Connecting the Community, discussion program Conversations with Jeff Weeks, and Nightmare Theatre, presentations of horror movies aired by several PBS stations in other Southeastern cities.

== Technical information ==
WSRE's transmitter facility is located near Robertsdale, Alabama.

Subchannel of WSRE
Subchannel	Res.	Short name	Programming
23.1	1080i	WSRE-HD	Main WSRE programming

=== Analog-to-digital conversion ===
WSRE ended regular programming on its analog signal, over UHF channel 23, on February 17, 2009, in compliance with the transition from analog to digital broadcasts. The station's digital signal remained on its pre-transition channel 31, using virtual channel 23. WSRE relocated its signal from channel 31 to channel 24 on January 17, 2020, as a result of the 2016 United States wireless spectrum auction.
