= WTJP-TV =

Television station in Gadsden, Alabama

- Gadsden–Birmingham, Alabama; United States
- City: Gadsden, Alabama
- Channels: Digital: 26 (UHF); Virtual: 60

Programming
- Affiliations: 60.1: TBN; for others, see § Subchannels

Ownership
- Owner: Trinity Broadcasting Network; (Trinity Broadcasting of Texas, Inc.)

History
- First air date: July 22, 1986
- Former channel numbers: Analog: 60 (UHF, 1986–2009)

Technical information
- Licensing authority: FCC
- Facility ID: 1002
- ERP: 1,000 kW
- HAAT: 329 m (1,079 ft)
- Transmitter coordinates: 33°48′53″N 86°26′55″W

Links
- Public license information: Public file; LMS
- Website: www.tbn.org

WTJP-TV (channel 60) is a television station licensed to Gadsden, Alabama, United States, serving the Birmingham area. The station is owned by the Trinity Broadcasting Network (TBN). WTJP-TV's transmitter is located on Blount Mountain near Springville, Alabama.

The station formerly operated from a studio located on Rosedale Avenue in Gadsden. That facility was one of several closed by TBN in 2019 following the Federal Communications Commission (FCC)'s repeal of the "Main Studio Rule", which required full-service television stations like WTJP-TV to maintain facilities in or near their communities of license.

== History ==
The station first signed on the air on July 22, 1986, and was built and signed on by All American TV (not to be confused with an unrelated television syndication company of a similar name), a minority-owned firm with close ties to the Trinity Broadcasting Network; all of All American's stations were TBN affiliates. TBN acquired the All American group outright, including WTJP, in 2000.

== Technical information ==
=== Subchannels ===
The station's signal is multiplexed:

Subchannels of WTJP-TV
Subchannel	Res.	Short name	Programming
60.1	720p	TBN HD	TBN
60.2	720p	TVDEALS	Infomercials
60.3	480i	Inspire	TBN Inspire
60.4	480i	ONTV4U	OnTV4U (infomercials) (4:3)
60.5	480i	POSITIV	Positiv

TBN-owned full-power stations permanently ceased analog transmissions on April 16, 2009.

=== Analog-to-digital conversion ===
WTJP-TV shut down its analog signal, over UHF channel 60, on April 16, 2009, ahead of the official June 12 date on which full-power television stations in the United States transitioned from analog to digital broadcasts under federal mandate. The station's digital signal remained on its pre-transition UHF channel 26, using virtual channel 60.

=== Former translators ===
WTJP-TV's signal was formerly relayed on low-power translator stations W51BY (channel 51) in Jasper and W46BU (channel 46) in Tuscaloosa; the latter station went silent on April 13, 2010, due to declining support, which was attributed to the digital transition.
