= WWJX =

Television station in Jackson, Mississippi

- Jackson, Mississippi; United States
- Channels: Digital: 23 (UHF); Virtual: 23

Programming
- Affiliations: 23.1: TCT; for others, see § Subchannels

Ownership
- Owner: Total Christian Television; (Radiant Life Ministries, Inc.)

History
- Founded: August 24, 2006
- First air date: July 2009
- Former affiliations: My Family TV; The Walk TV; AMGTV

Technical information
- Licensing authority: FCC
- Facility ID: 166512
- ERP: 20 kW; 50 kW (CP)
- HAAT: 150 m (492 ft); 256 m (840 ft) (CP)
- Transmitter coordinates: 32°3′13.6″N 90°20′23.3″W; 32°12′29″N 90°24′50″W (CP)

Links
- Public license information: Public file; LMS
- Website: www.tct.tv

WWJX (channel 23) is a religious television station in Jackson, Mississippi, United States, owned by Total Christian Television (TCT). The station's transmitter is located in Hinds County, Mississippi, between Crystal Springs and Terry.

Although WWJX is licensed as a full-power station, its broadcast range is comparable to that of a low-power station, thus being limited to the immediate Jackson area. Therefore, it relies on cable and satellite carriage to reach the entire market.

== History ==
The station was granted a construction permit by the Federal Communications Commission (FCC) on August 24, 2006. WWJX officially began broadcasting in July 2009.

On May 28, 2020, Flinn Broadcasting Corporation announced that it would sell WWJX, along with sister stations KCWV in Duluth, Minnesota, WBIH in Selma, Alabama, and WFBD in Destin, Florida, to Marion, Illinois–based Total Christian Television for an undisclosed price. The sale was completed on September 15; the stations became owned-and-operated stations of the TCT network two days later, with WWJX becoming the second religious television station in the Jackson area (religious programming has been offered by WRBJ-TV when Roberts Broadcasting sold that station to the Trinity Broadcasting Network in 2013). In addition, WWJX became a sister station to WFXW in Greenville, Mississippi (which was donated by John Wagner to TCT prior to the closing on June 12, 2020).

== Subchannels ==
The station's signal is multiplexed:

Subchannels of WWJX
Channel	Res.	Short name	Programming
23.1	1080i	WWJX	TCT
23.2	480i	SBN	SonLife
23.3	480i	Quest	Quest
23.4	480i	GDT2	[Blank]
23.5	480i	JTV	Jewelry TV
23.6	480i	Buzzr	Buzzr
23.7	480i	ONTV4U	OnTV4U (4:3)
23.8	480i	ShopLC	Shop LC
23.9	480i	GDT	Infomercials (4:3)
