= WFBD =

Television station in Destin, Florida

- Destin–Pensacola, Florida; Mobile, Alabama; United States
- City: Destin, Florida
- Channels: Digital: 29 (UHF); Virtual: 48

Programming
- Affiliations: 48.1: TCT; for others, see § Subchannels

Ownership
- Owner: Total Christian Television; (Radiant Life Ministries, Inc.)

History
- Founded: April 5, 1996
- First air date: November 7, 2005
- Former channel numbers: Digital: 48 (UHF, 2005–2020)
- Former affiliations: America One (2005–2014); Independent (2014–2020)

Technical information
- Licensing authority: FCC
- Facility ID: 81669
- ERP: DTS1: 704 kW; DTS2: 80 kW
- HAAT: DTS1: 312 m (1,024 ft); DTS2: 191.6 m (629 ft)
- Transmitter coordinates: DTS1: 30°59′52″N 86°43′13″W; DTS2: 30°36′41″N 87°36′26″W
- Translator(s): WPAN 53.2 Fort Walton Beach

Links
- Public license information: Public file; LMS
- Website: www.tct.tv

WFBD (channel 48) is a religious television station licensed to Destin, Florida, United States, serving northwest Florida and southwest Alabama. The station is owned by Total Christian Television (TCT). WFBD's primary transmitter is located near Wing, Alabama, north of the Alabama–Florida state line.

Due to its transmitter location, WFBD's signal covers the eastern half of the Pensacola–Mobile area and not Mobile proper. Therefore, in order to serve the western part of the market, the station is simulcast in high definition on the second digital subchannel of Fort Walton Beach–licensed WPAN (channel 53.2) from its transmitter near Molino, Florida.

== History ==
The channel 48 frequency was previously used by former TV station WKAB-TV (1952–1954).

WFBD was formerly an affiliate of the America One television network, and a subscriber to the Independent News Network. It later switched to a format of local programming and infomercials.

On May 28, 2020, Flinn Broadcasting Corporation announced that it would sell WFBD, along with sister stations KCWV in Duluth, Minnesota, WBIH in Selma, Alabama, and WWJX in Jackson, Mississippi, to Marion, Illinois–based Total Christian Television for an undisclosed price. The sale was completed on September 15; the stations became owned-and-operated stations of the TCT network two days later, with WFBD becoming the fourth full-power religious station in the Pensacola–Mobile area.

== Subchannels ==
The station's signal is multiplexed:

Subchannels of WFBD
Subchannel	Res.	Short name	Programming
48.1	720p	WFBD HD	TCT
48.2	480i	SBN	SonLife
48.3	480i	HEROES	Heroes & Icons
48.4	480i	START	Start TV
48.5	480i	BUZZRTV	Buzzr
48.6	480i	MOVIES	Movies!
48.7	480i	DABL	Dabl
48.8	480i	GDT	Infomercials
48.9	480i	ONTV4U	OnTV4U (4:3)
48.10	480i	WEST	WEST
