= List of television stations in Michigan =

This is a list of broadcast television stations that are licensed in the U.S. state of Michigan.

== Full-power ==
- Stations are arranged by media market served and channel position.

Full-power television stations in Michigan
Media market	Station	Channel	Primary affiliation(s)	Notes	Refs
Alpena	WCML	6	PBS	(Note: Satellite of WCMU-TV.)	
Alpena	WBKB-TV	11	CBS, NBC on 11.2, ABC on 11.3, Fox on 11.4		
Detroit	WJBK	2	Fox		
Detroit	WDIV-TV	4	NBC		
Detroit	WXYZ-TV	7	ABC		
Detroit	WMYD	20	Independent		
Detroit	WPXD-TV	31	Ion Television	(Note: Licensed to Ann Arbor, Michigan.)	
Detroit	WADL	38	MyNetworkTV	(Note: Licensed to Mount Clemens, Michigan.)	
Detroit	WKBD-TV	50	The CW		
Detroit	WTVS	56	PBS		
Detroit	WWJ-TV	62	CBS		
Flint	WNEM-TV	5	CBS, MyNetworkTV on 5.2	(Note: Licensed to Bay City, Michigan.)	
Flint	WJRT-TV	12	ABC		
Flint	WDCQ	19	PBS	(Note: Licensed to Bad Axe, Michigan.)	
Flint	WEYI-TV	25	NBC, The CW on 25.2	(Note: Licensed to Saginaw, Michigan.)	
Flint	WBSF	46	The CW, NBC on 46.2		
Flint	WAQP	49	TCT		
Flint	WSMH	66	Fox		
Grand Rapids	WWMT	3	CBS, The CW on 3.2	(Note: Licensed to Kalamazoo, Michigan.)	
Grand Rapids	WOOD-TV	8	NBC		
Grand Rapids	WZZM	13	ABC		
Grand Rapids	WXMI	17	Fox		
Grand Rapids	WGVU-TV	35	PBS		
Grand Rapids	WOTV	41	ABC	(Note: Licensed to Battle Creek, Michigan.)	
Grand Rapids	WZPX-TV	43	Ion Television		
Grand Rapids	WGVK	52	PBS	(Note: Satellite of WGVU-TV.)	
Grand Rapids	WTLJ	54	TCT	(Note: Licensed to Muskegon, Michigan.)	
Grand Rapids	WLLA	64	Religious independent		
Lansing	WLNS-TV	6	CBS		
Lansing	WILX-TV	10	NBC	(Note: Licensed to Onondaga, Michigan.)	
Lansing	WKAR-TV	23	PBS	(Note: Licensed to East Lansing, Michigan.)	
Lansing	WSYM-TV	47	Fox, MyNetworkTV on 47.4		
Lansing	WLAJ	53	ABC, The CW on 53.2		
Marquette	WJMN-TV	3	ABC, The CW on 3.2, MyNetworkTV on 3.3	(Note: Licensed to Escanaba, Michigan.) (Note: Satellite of WBUP.)	
Marquette	WBKP	5	The CW, ABC on 5.2	(Note: Licensed to Calumet, Michigan.)	
Marquette	WLUC-TV	6	NBC, Fox on 6.2		
Marquette	WBUP	10	ABC, The CW on 10.2	(Note: Licensed to Ishpeming, Michigan.)	
Marquette	WNMU	13	PBS		
Marquette	WZMQ	19	MeTV, CBS on 19.2		
Sault Ste. Marie	WTOM-TV	4	NBC, ABC on 4.2	(Note: Licensed to Cheboygan, Michigan.) (Note: Satellite of WPBN-TV.)	
Sault Ste. Marie	WGTQ	8	ABC, NBC on 8.2	(Note: Satellite of WGTU.)	
Sault Ste. Marie	WWUP	10	CBS, Fox on 10.2	(Note: Satellite of WWTV.)	
Traverse City–Cadillac	WPBN-TV	7	NBC, ABC on 7.2		
Traverse City–Cadillac	WWTV	9	CBS, Fox on 9.2		
Traverse City–Cadillac	WCMU-TV	14	PBS	(Note: Licensed to Mount Pleasant, Michigan.)	
Traverse City–Cadillac	WCMW	21	PBS	(Note: Licensed to Manistee, Michigan.)	
Traverse City–Cadillac	WCMV	27	PBS		
Traverse City–Cadillac	WGTU	29	ABC, NBC on 29.2		
Traverse City–Cadillac	WFQX-TV	32	Fox, The CW on 33.2		
Traverse City–Cadillac	WFUP	45	Fox, CBS on 45.2	(Note: Licensed to Vanderbilt, Michigan.)	

== Low-power ==
Low-power television stations in Michigan
Media market	Station	Channel	Network	Notes	Refs
Detroit	WHNE-LD	3	Various		
Detroit	WHPS-CD	15	Various, Independent on 15.2		
Detroit	WDWO-CD	18	Various		
Detroit	WUDL-LD	19	Various		
Detroit	WUDT-LD	23	Daystar		
Detroit	WLPC-CD	28	Religious independent	(Note: Licensed to Redford, Michigan.)	
Flint	W19FG-D	4	[Blank]	(Note: Licensed to Midland, Michigan.)	
Flint	WXON-LD	9	Various		
Flint	WFFC-LD	17	Various		
Flint	WKNX-LD	22	[Blank]	(Note: Licensed to Pinconning, Michigan.)	
Flint	W35DQ-D	24	Various		
Flint	WBWM-LD	28	[Blank]		
Flint	W24DL-D	42	3ABN		
Grand Rapids	WXSP-CD	15	MyNetworkTV		
Grand Rapids	WUHO-LD	18	[Blank]		
Grand Rapids	WUHQ-LD	29	Daystar		
Grand Rapids	WMKG-CD	31	Various		
Grand Rapids	W27ED-D	48	TBN		
Sault Ste. Marie	W28DY-D	28	3ABN		
Traverse City	WXII-LD	12	MyNetworkTV and Cozi TV	(Note: Licensed to Cedar, Michigan.)	
Traverse City	W16DN-D	16	Various		
Traverse City	W19EZ-D	19	Traffic cameras	(Note: Licensed to Houghton Lake, Michigan.)	
Traverse City	W22EL-D	22	Silent		
Traverse City	W23EB-D	23	3ABN	(Note: Licensed to Cadillac, Michigan.)	
Traverse City	WMNN-LD	26	Various	(Note: Licensed to Lake City, Michigan.)	
Traverse City	W36FH-D	36	Various		

== Translators ==
Television station translators in Michigan
Media market	Station	Channel	Translating	Notes	Refs
Flint	W27ET-D	27	WBPI-CD		
Flint	W31FF-D	31	WBPI-CD		
Grand Rapids	WOBC-CD	14	WXSP-CD		
Grand Rapids	WOLP-CD	15	WXSP-CD		
Grand Rapids	W18ER-D	17	WXMI		
Grand Rapids	W36FA-D	17	WXMI	(Note: Licensed to Hesperia, Michigan.)	
Grand Rapids	WXMI (DRT)	17	WXMI		
Grand Rapids	WXMI (DRT)	17	WXMI		
Grand Rapids	WOGC-CD	25	WOOD-TV	(Note: Licensed to Holland, Michigan.)	
Grand Rapids	WOMS-CD	29	WXSP-CD		
Grand Rapids	WOHO-CD	33	WXSP-CD		
Grand Rapids	WOKZ-CD	50	WXSP-CD		
Grand Rapids	WJGP-LD	54	WTLJ		
Marquette	W14EM-D	6	WLUC-TV		
Sault Ste. Marie	W28EJ-D	28	W16DN-D	(Note: Licensed to Charles, Michigan.)	
Sault Ste. Marie	W30DQ-D	30	W19EZ-D		
Traverse City	W27DQ-D	2	W16DN-D	(Note: Licensed to Elmhurst, Michigan.)	
Traverse City	W27DU-D	2	W19EZ-D		
Traverse City	WPBN (DRT)	7	WPBN-TV	(Note: Licensed to Harrietta, Michigan.)	
Traverse City	WPBN (DRT)	7	WPBN-TV		
Traverse City	WWTV (DRT)	9	WWTV		
Traverse City	W15DF-D	15	W16DN-D		
Traverse City	W19FB-D	19	WBPI-CD		
Traverse City	W20DT-D	20	W16DN-D		
Traverse City	W31FI-D	20	WBPI-CD		
Traverse City	W23FL-D	23	WFQX-TV		
Traverse City	W31FA-D	31	W27ET-D		
~Wausau, WI	W32CV-D	21	KQDS-TV	(Note: Licensed to Ironwood, Michigan.)	

== Defunct ==
- WBKZ-TV Battle Creek (1953–1954)
- WCMZ-TV Flint (1980–2018)
- WDHS Iron Mountain (1986–2015)
- WGPR-TV Detroit (1975–1995, became WWJ-TV)
- WHTV Jackson (1999–2017)
- WILS-TV/WTOM-TV Lansing (1953–1956)
- WJMY Allen Park (1962–1963)
- WMKG-TV Muskegon (1967–1971)
- WPAG-TV Ann Arbor (1953–1957)
- WTAC-TV Flint (1953–1954)
