= WLNM-LD =

LPTV station in Lansing, Michigan

Translator of WILX-TV, Onondaga, Michigan
- Lansing, Michigan; United States
- Channels: Digital: 29 (UHF); Virtual: 29
- Branding: see WILX-TV

Programming
- Affiliations: 29.1: NBC; for others, see § Subchannels

Ownership
- Owner: Gray Media; (Gray Television Licensee, LLC)
- Sister stations: WILX-TV, WSYM-TV

History
- Founded: November 25, 1986
- First air date: April 19, 1991
- Former call signs: W69BJ (1991–2003); W27CN (2003–2009); W27CN-D (2009–2016)
- Former channel numbers: Analog: 69 (UHF, 1991–2003), 27 (UHF, 2003–2009); Digital: 27 (UHF, 2009–2020); Virtual: 27 (2009–2022)
- Former affiliations: As translator of WAQP: TBN/TCT (1991–2007); TCT only (2007–2020; now on 29.7)
- Call sign meaning: Lansing, Michigan

Technical information
- Licensing authority: FCC
- Facility ID: 67779
- Class: LD
- ERP: 15 kW
- HAAT: 241.4 m (792 ft)
- Transmitter coordinates: 42°42′6.9″N 84°24′47.8″W

Links
- Public license information: LMS
- Website: www.wilx.com

WLNM-LD (channel 29) is a low-power television station in Lansing, Michigan, United States. It is a translator of Onondaga-licensed NBC affiliate WILX-TV (channel 10) which is owned by Gray Media; it is also sister to Fox affiliate WSYM-TV (channel 47). WLNM-LD's transmitter is located on River Street along the Red Cedar River southeast of Lansing; its parent station maintains studios on American Road (near I-96) in the city.

== History ==
WLNM-LD first signed-on the air in 1991 as W69BJ on channel 69, as a translator of Saginaw-based WAQP (channel 49), a station owned by Tri-State Christian Television (TCT). The station relocated to channel 27 as W27CN in November 2003.

TCT also carried many programs from the Trinity Broadcasting Network (TBN). In 2007, TCT discontinued carriage of TBN programming, instead relying on productions of its own programs and direct carriage of programs from other ministries.

In July 2009, the station's digital transmitter was put into service with a flash-cut, ending its analog service and adding a "-D" suffix to its callsign at that time. The station's callsign changed to the lettered WLNM-LD on February 8, 2016.

On February 14, 2020, TCT agreed to sell WLNM-LD to Gray Television for $175,000; the sale, which was completed on May 1, includes a lease agreement allowing TCT to continue carrying a subchannel on the station for five years after closing. WLNM-LD has since operated as a translator of WILX-TV, serving mainly to improve WILX's reception in the few areas of the market without cable or satellite that lost access to the main WILX signal after the digital transition. In June 2024, WLNM moved to a new tower that significantly increased its over-the-air footprint.

== Subchannels ==
The station's signal is multiplexed:

Subchannels of WLNM-LD
Channel	Res.	Short name	Programming
29.1	1080i	WILX-DT	NBC (WILX-TV)
29.2	480i	MeTV	MeTV (WILX-DT2)
29.3	480i	startTV	Start TV
29.4	480i	Story	Story Television
29.5	480i	MOVIES!	Movies!
29.6	480i	Catchy	Catchy Comedy
29.7	480i	TCT	TCT

Simulcast of subchannels of another station
