= KWKB =

Television station in Iowa City, Iowa

- Iowa City–Cedar Rapids–; Waterloo–Dubuque, Iowa; United States
- City: Iowa City, Iowa
- Channels: Digital: 25 (UHF); Virtual: 20

Programming
- Affiliations: 20.1: TCT; for others, see § Subchannels

Ownership
- Owner: Total Christian Television; (Faith Broadcasting Network, Inc.)

History
- Founded: May 10, 1996
- First air date: August 30, 1999
- Former channel numbers: Analog: 20 (UHF, 1999–2009)
- Former affiliations: The WB (1999–2006); The CW (primary, 2006–2016); MyNetworkTV (secondary, 2006–2011); This TV (2016–2019); Azteca América (2019); Escape/Court TV Mystery (2019–2021)
- Call sign meaning: The WB initials between two "K"s

Technical information
- Licensing authority: FCC
- Facility ID: 35096
- ERP: 1,000 kW
- HAAT: 418.9 m (1,374 ft)
- Transmitter coordinates: 41°43′29.2″N 91°21′10.2″W

Links
- Public license information: Public file; LMS
- Website: www.tct.tv

KWKB (channel 20) is a religious television station licensed to Iowa City, Iowa, United States, serving the Eastern Iowa and Quad Cities television markets. The station is owned by Total Christian Television (TCT). KWKB's transmitter is located on Baker Avenue in West Branch.

== History ==
KWKB signed on the air August 30, 1999, as an affiliate of The WB. It carried the full WB and Kids' WB lineups.

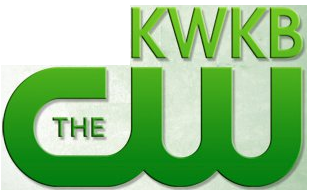
KWKB's Former logo as a CW affiliate.

"My KWKB" logo, used during MyNetworkTV programming from September 5, 2006, to September 16, 2011.

From September 5, 2006, to September 16, 2011, KWKB was affiliated with both The CW as a primary network and MyNetworkTV as a secondary network. When KNVA in Austin, Texas, became a sole CW affiliate in October 2009 after carrying MyNetworkTV as a secondary affiliation, KWKB became the only station in the country to have carried the full CW and MyNetworkTV lineups including The CW's Saturday morning children's block Toonzai (although CW affiliates KCWI in Des Moines, WLMT in Memphis and KXVO in Omaha carried WWE SmackDown! from MyNetworkTV until that show moved to cable channel Syfy in October 2010).

Until September 16, 2011, KWKB aired MyNetworkTV programming from 9 to 11 p.m., immediately following CW programming. The satellite feeds for MyNetworkTV and The CW are actually aired at the same time, so MyNetworkTV programming was recorded and broadcast two hours after it is aired on other MyNetworkTV affiliates. However, as of September 19, 2011, KWKB dropped MyNetworkTV in favor of syndicated fare. This briefly left the Cedar Rapids market one of two markets in Iowa without an affiliate for the network until October 3, when Des Moines' This TV affiliate KDMI re-affiliated with the network (as a secondary affiliation) after it had initially dropped it in 2009. However, as of October 2011, KCRG-TV digital channel 9.2 is carrying the MyNetworkTV programming service on a delayed basis from 12 to 2 a.m. KWKB was the last CW-affiliated station that carried MyNetworkTV on the same feed as The CW until 2014, when Columbia, South Carolina's existing MyNetworkTV affiliate WKTC, and later in 2016, when Chicago's MyNetworkTV (O&O) affiliate WPWR-TV added a primary CW affiliation while retaining MyNetworkTV as a secondary affiliation on their main channel.

KWKB lost The CW when their charter 10-year affiliation agreement expired in September 2016, when KWWL acquired the affiliation on their second subchannel. Concurrently, KWKB switched to This TV, taking that affiliation from KWWL's second subchannel. KWKB carried a mix of This TV programming along with its own syndicated programming.

In February 2011, KWKB began carrying the Antenna TV network on digital subchannel 20.2 until January 2015 when Antenna TV moved to KCRG-TV's digital subchannel 9.3. KWKB has been airing The Works on 20.2 since August 2015. Following the demise of The Works, the subchannel was replaced by Light TV.

In June 2018, Chicago-based KM Communications announced that it would sell KWKB to HC2 Holdings for $1,850,000; the sale was completed on January 29, 2019. In February 2019, KWKB dropped This TV and became an Azteca América owned-and-operated station; however, this status did not last long, as the station would become an affiliate of the female-oriented network Escape (now Ion Mystery) in May.

On March 18, 2021, it was announced that KWKB and sister station KPNZ in Ogden, Utah, would be sold to Marion, Illinois–based Total Christian Television for $4 million. The sale was completed on August 2.

== Subchannels ==
The station's signal is multiplexed:

Subchannels of KWKB
Channel	Res.	Short name	Programming
20.1	720p	KWKB HD	TCT
20.2	480i	IONMyst	Ion Mystery (4:3)
20.3	480i	SBN	SonLife (4:3)
20.4	480i	StartTV	Start TV (4:3)
20.5	720p	CHSN	Chicago Sports Network
20.6	480i	JTV	Jewelry TV (4:3)
20.7	480i	WEST	WEST (4:3)
20.8	480i	BizTV	Biz TV (4:3)
20.9	480i	Get TV	Great (4:3)
20.10	480i	ONTV4U	OnTV4U (4:3)
20.11	480i	GDT	Infomercials (4:3)
