= Onondaga Township, Michigan =

- Civil township
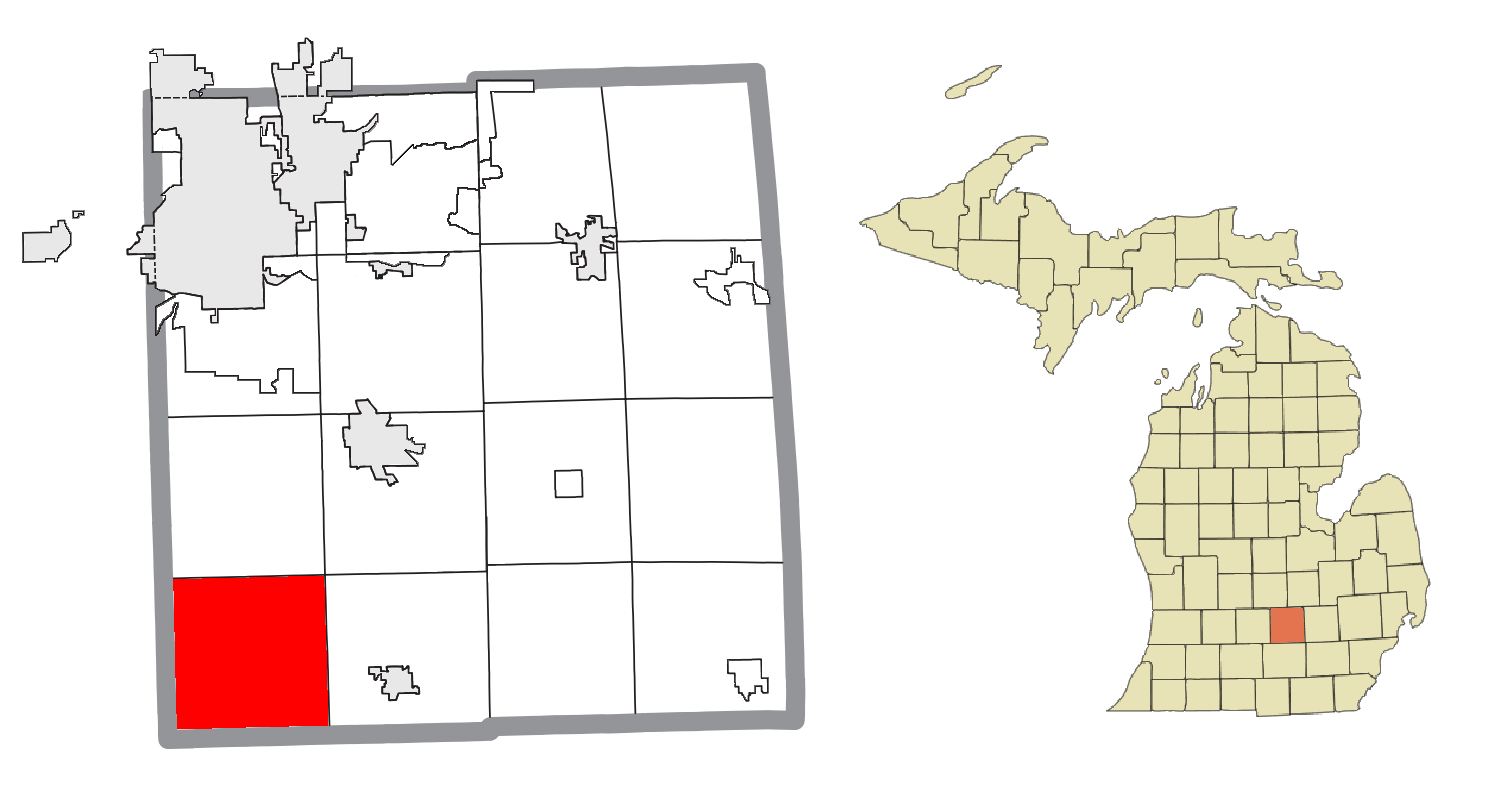
- Location within Ingham County

- Location within the state of Michigan Location within the United States
- Coordinates: 42°27′29″N 84°33′22″W
- Country: United States
- State: Michigan
- County: Ingham

Government
  - Supervisor: Phil Hutchison
  - Clerk: Marcie Seavolt

Area
  - Total: 36.49 sq mi (94.51 km^{2})
  - Land: 36.11 sq mi (93.52 km^{2})
  - Water: 0.38 sq mi (0.98 km^{2})
- Elevation: 938 ft (286 m)

Population (2020)
  - Total: 2,997
  - Density: 83.00/sq mi (32.05/km^{2})
- Time zone: UTC-5 (Eastern (EST))
  - Summer (DST): UTC-4 (EDT)
- ZIP code(s): 48827 (Eaton Rapids); 48854 (Mason); 49251 (Leslie); 49264 (Onondaga)
- Area code: 517
- FIPS code: 26-60800
- GNIS feature ID: 1626849
- Website: https://onondagatownship.org/

Onondaga Township is a civil township of Ingham County in the U.S. state of Michigan. The population was 2,997 at the 2020 census.

== Communities ==
- Onondaga is an unincorporated community located within the township. The Onondaga 49264 ZIP Code serves the majority of the township, as well as smaller areas in Hamlin Township to the west and Tompkins Township to the south.

== Geography ==
According to the United States Census Bureau, the township has a total area of 36.49 square miles (94.51 km^{2}), of which 36.11 square miles (93.52 km^{2}) is land and 0.38 square miles (0.98 km^{2}) (1.04%) is water.

== Demographics ==
As of the census of 2000, there were 2,958 people, 993 households, and 802 families residing in the township. The population density was 81.0 inhabitants per square mile (31.3/km^{2}). There were 1,031 housing units at an average density of 28.2 per square mile (10.9/km^{2}). The racial makeup of the township was 95.44% White, 0.30% African American, 0.27% Native American, 0.03% Asian, 0.10% Pacific Islander, 1.93% from other races, and 1.93% from two or more races. Hispanic or Latino of any race were 2.94% of the population.

There were 993 households, out of which 42.3% had children under the age of 18 living with them, 68.4% were married couples living together, 8.2% had a female householder with no husband present, and 19.2% were non-families. 15.1% of all households were made up of individuals, and 4.5% had someone living alone who was 65 years of age or older. The average household size was 2.91 and the average family size was 3.20.

In the township the population was spread out, with 30.6% under the age of 18, 6.5% from 18 to 24, 32.2% from 25 to 44, 23.6% from 45 to 64, and 7.1% who were 65 years of age or older. The median age was 35 years. For every 100 females, there were 101.0 males. For every 100 females age 18 and over, there were 100.4 males.

The median income for a household in the township was $52,216, and the median income for a family was $57,500. Males had a median income of $39,519 versus $28,900 for females. The per capita income for the township was $18,981. About 5.6% of families and 9.0% of the population were below the poverty line, including 8.8% of those under age 18 and 8.1% of those age 65 or over.
