= WSYM-TV =

Television station in Lansing, Michigan

- Lansing–Jackson, Michigan; United States
- City: Lansing, Michigan
- Channels: Digital: 28 (UHF); Virtual: 47
- Branding: Fox 47; 47+ (47.2)

Programming
- Affiliations: 47.1: Fox; 47.2: Independent; for others, see § Subchannels

Ownership
- Owner: Gray Media; (Gray Television Licensee, LLC)
- Sister stations: WILX-TV

History
- First air date: December 1, 1982
- Former call signs: WFSL-TV (1982–1985)
- Former channel numbers: Analog: 47 (UHF, 1982–2009); Digital: 38 (UHF, 2001–2020)
- Former affiliations: Independent (1982–1990); MyNetworkTV (47.2, 2017–2025)
- Call sign meaning: We Said Yes to Michigan, as in the "Say Yes to Michigan" slogan used by the state in the 1980s and 1990s

Technical information
- Licensing authority: FCC
- Facility ID: 74094
- ERP: 642 kW; 1,000 kW (CP)
- HAAT: 305 m (1,001 ft)
- Transmitter coordinates: 42°28′3″N 84°39′6″W

Links
- Public license information: Public file; LMS

WSYM-TV (channel 47) is a television station in Lansing, Michigan, United States, affiliated with the Fox network. It is owned by Gray Media alongside NBC affiliate WILX-TV (channel 10). The two stations share studios on American Road (near I-96) in Lansing; WSYM-TV's transmitter is located in Hamlin Township along M-50/M-99/South Clinton Trail.

Channel 47 in Lansing went on the air December 1, 1982, as WFSL-TV, owned by real estate developers Joel Ferguson and Sol Steadman as an independent station. Although Lansing was the largest market in the country without a full-time ABC affiliate, the network rebuffed Ferguson and Steadman's requests for an affiliation to avoid encroaching on the service areas of three nearby affiliates. Ferguson and Steadman sold WFSL-TV to The Journal Company in 1985; the new owners changed the call sign to WSYM-TV. In spite of the 1986 launch of Fox, WSYM-TV's continued courtship of ABC led it to avoid the new network. This changed when Ferguson started a second Lansing station, WLAJ, in 1990. Ferguson designed WLAJ's signal pattern to meet ABC's requirements and win that network's affiliation, leading WSYM-TV to become a Fox affiliate.

Under Journal, WSYM-TV began a 10 p.m. newscast in 1997 but turned over production of its newscasts to WILX-TV in 2004. The station eventually aired morning, early evening, and late evening newscasts produced by WILX. After Journal's stations merged into the E. W. Scripps Company in 2015, WSYM-TV began an in-house news operation at the start of 2021. Scripps traded WSYM-TV to WILX-TV owner Gray Media in a transaction completed in April 2026.

== History ==
=== WFSL-TV: Early years ===
The Lansing–Jackson television market was dominated by two major commercial VHF stations, WJIM-TV (now WLNS-TV) on channel 6 and WILX-TV (channel 10), since the latter station began in 1959. In the late 1970s, interest emerged in activating a third local station on a UHF channel: channel 36, then allocated to Lansing. Three applicants had already filed for the channel by 1979. Benko Broadcasting was owned by two brothers, one of whom was a judge in Sanilac County; Kare-Kim Broadcasting Corporation, whose primary stakeholder, Donald Haney, was a television personality in Detroit; and F&S Comm/News was primarily owned by former Lansing city councilman Joel Ferguson and business partner Sol Steadman. Three additional shareholders owned one percent apiece, which with Ferguson's stake made the company 51.5% Black-owned: businessman Greg Eaton and former Michigan State Spartans men's basketball players Greg Kelser and Earvin "Magic" Johnson.

On August 4, 1980, the Federal Communications Commission (FCC) issued a ruling that complicated the picture for the channel 36 applicants. It changed the channel allocation from 36 to 47 as part of changes in five Michigan and Ohio cities, necessary to conform with a new Canadian table of allocations for UHF channels. This was not a trivial change for the Lansing applicants, as channel 47 was short-spaced with location restrictions. These restrictions, to channel 62 in Detroit, had led the FCC in 1967 to allot channel 36 instead of 47 at Lansing. In restoring channel 47 to Lansing, the FCC gave the existing applicants from the channel 36 case the opportunity to keep the short-spaced channel or specify Lansing's other UHF channel, channel 53. Benko and Kare-Kim opted for channel 53, and the FCC declared a comparative hearing for their applications in May 1981. F&S Comm/News was the only applicant who selected channel 47 and was awarded a construction permit on December 10, 1981.

By the time F&S Comm/News obtained the channel 47 construction permit, the company was already making its mark in local television, particularly around Michigan State Spartans athletics. It produced and syndicated the MSU football coaches' show featuring head coach Muddy Waters, and in September 1980, the firm won the bidding to produce Michigan State men's basketball telecasts, which it then syndicated to WILX-TV and other Michigan TV stations. The station set up studios in the Capitol Commons office park, developed by Ferguson and Steadman, on the edge of downtown Lansing. An estimated $6 million was spent on equipment, office space, and programming.

Grade A signal contours for WSYM-TV, WLAJ, WJRT, WUHQ (now WOTV) and WXYZ-TV, c. 1998. WSYM-TV's analog signal (green) overlapped with ABC affiliates WJRT to the northeast, WUHQ to the west, and WXYZ-TV to the east, preventing WSYM from affiliating with ABC. WLAJ's analog signal (blue) was intentionally engineered to not interfere with these stations, and became Lansing's ABC affiliate.

Channel 47 began broadcasting December 1, 1982, as WFSL-TV, an independent station with a schedule dominated by movies as well as the MSU basketball package. The lack of network affiliation came as something of a surprise to local observers. One of the reasons channel 36 had initially attracted interest prior to 1980 was the prospect of bringing an ABC affiliate to Lansing. At the time, Lansing was the largest market in the country without an in-market ABC affiliate. WJRT-TV in Flint was the primary source of ABC programming in Lansing; other parts of the market could watch ABC over-the-air on WUHQ in Battle Creek or WXYZ-TV from Detroit. However, cable was often necessary to get a good ABC signal, particularly in Jackson. Knowing this, Ferguson and Steadman made numerous overtures for an ABC affiliation in the lead-up to WFSL's launch. However, ABC turned them all down due to significant signal overlaps with WXYZ-TV (which ABC owned at the time), WJRT, and especially WUHQ-TV. When the construction permit for channel 47 was awarded, the FCC dismissed a protest by WUHQ-TV, which sought to establish translators in Jackson and Lansing.

WFSL-TV's first months on air were lean. The station laid off a third of its 50-person staff before conditions improved. Tom Jones, WFSL-TV's general manager, blamed its struggles on jitters that local and regional advertisers had about independent stations. They had seen WWMA-TV in Grand Rapids miss its planned starting date by nine months and were reticent to commit their Christmas advertising budget to an unproven station that might not be on in time for the holidays and, in any event, had no ratings survey for four months to show a proven audience. This began to turn after basketball season, which served as a promotional vehicle for the new channel 47 and its programs.

=== WSYM-TV: Journal ownership and Fox affiliation ===
On August 7, 1984, Ferguson and Steadman announced the sale of WFSL-TV to The Journal Company, a Milwaukee-based publisher/broadcaster that owned the WTMJ stations in that city and The Milwaukee Journal newspaper, for $9 million, becoming Journal's third television station. The deal, finalized at the end of 1984, represented a tripling of an investment of about $3 million. Journal overhauled the station's programming, emphasizing syndicated material over movies, and changed the station's call sign to WSYM-TV—"We Said Yes to Michigan"—on March 11, 1985. The new call sign referenced the slogan "Say Yes to Michigan", which the state used for economic development and tourism between 1981 and 1997.

Journal continued to campaign for Lansing's ABC affiliation, as it had good relations with the network through its second owned station and ABC affiliate, KTNV-TV in Las Vegas. The station held talks with ABC in 1985, but ABC—again attempting to avoid upsetting its other affiliates—opted against affiliating. Channel 47 passed up on the Fox network when it launched in 1986 and declined to join the Detroit Pistons television network. General manager Dale Parker cited that Detroit's Fox affiliate, WKBD-TV (channel 50), was already a statewide superstation on cable and had over-the-air availability in the market. He was concerned that ratings and advertising revenue would be reduced due to WKBD's existing and aggressive out-of-market presence. Only upon Parker's departure in late 1988 did WSYM-TV begin to air the Pistons.

When I owned WSYM, we had a powerful signal. When I went to buy a station in Las Vegas, I realized I didn't need all that powerful stuff. Once the signal was out of the city, all there was was desert, anyway. So when I designed WLAJ, I cut the signal down to just the areas we are targeting. It will miss Battle Creek entirely.

— Joel Ferguson

WSYM-TV was still an independent station when, in 1989, Joel Ferguson agreed to buy the channel 53 permit from Benko. The reactivation of plans for channel 53 immediately started to unblock the ABC logjam. Neither ABC nor Fox had an affiliate in the Lansing market, and ABC was seen to be in the driver's seat with a choice of possible affiliates (WSYM or WLAJ). The FCC granted final approval for the WLAJ sale in March 1990, leaving ABC with the decision between WSYM and WLAJ as its local affiliate. In a bid to court the network, Ferguson redesigned WLAJ's signal pattern to protect WJRT and WUHQ; this was successful, and on May 23, 1990, ABC awarded the Lansing affiliation to WLAJ. This eliminated the primary reason WSYM had held out on network affiliation. In response, WSYM-TV joined Fox on September 16, 1990. It continued to air the Pistons until 1993, when new general manager Judy Kenney dropped the team to give priority to Fox programming.

=== First in-house news department ===
Over the course of the 1990s, Fox encouraged its stations to begin airing or producing local newscasts. Kenney had been sent to Lansing in 1993 under orders from Journal to develop a news department, but she reached the conclusion that the time was not right. That changed in 1997, when WSYM-TV committed to airing a 10 p.m. newscast, originally envisioned as an hourlong report. Fox 47 News debuted on September 8, 1997, with a half-hour newscast at 10 p.m. and an 11 p.m. edition added two weeks later. The latter was gone by February 1998.

The in-house news department never gained the traction that management desired. In 2000, the station experimented with an hour-long 10 p.m. newscast but soon reverted, only to return to a full hour at 10 in 2002. The next year, the station debuted a newscast at 5 p.m. and then moved it to 5:30 p.m. to counterprogram WLNS-TV and WILX-TV.

=== Outsourcing of news to WILX-TV ===
Beginning August 30, 2004, the production of WSYM-TV's 5:30 and 10 p.m. newscasts was outsourced to WILX-TV, though the news on channel 47 retained a partially separate anchor team for news and weather and came from a different set. WSYM's 23 newsroom employees lost their jobs, though 10 positions were created at WILX-TV to handle the enlarged operation. These remained the only local newscasts on WSYM-TV until 2015, when a two-hour extension of WILX-TV's morning newscast began airing from 7 to 9 a.m.; this replaced a television simulcast of Michigan's Big Show, a talk radio program hosted by Michael Patrick Shiels. WILX-TV debuted its own 5:30 p.m. newscast in 2018.

In 2014, WSYM began operating MyNetworkTV outlet WHTV through a local marketing agreement, replacing WLNS-TV as the service partner. WHTV left the air in 2017, with much of its programming moving to a subchannel of WSYM.

=== Scripps ownership, second in-house local news department, and trade to Gray ===
On April 1, 2015, the E. W. Scripps Company completed the simultaneous acquisition of Journal Communications, retaining the television properties while spinning off both firms' newspaper holdings. Scripps announced on October 8, 2020, that WSYM would reinstate its news department on January 1, 2021, ending its news share agreement with WILX. The new news department, structured around a neighborhood reporting model, had an initial staff of 15 reporters, editors, and producers.

On July 7, 2025, it was announced that, in an exchange of several stations between Scripps and Gray Media, WSYM would be traded to Gray, forming a duopoly with WILX. The swap required deregulatory action at the FCC because existing rules would not permit the common ownership of WILX and WSYM without a waiver. The FCC approved the multi-market exchange on April 28, 2026, and the deal closed on May 15, at which time operations were unified at WILX under WILX's general manager.

=== Notable former on-air staff ===
- Ahmed Fareed – sports anchor (2003–2004)

== Technical information ==
=== Subchannels ===
WSYM-TV's transmitter is located in Hamlin Township along M-50/M-99/South Clinton Trail. The station's signal is multiplexed:

Subchannels of WSYM-TV
Subchannel	Res.	Short name	Programming
47.1	720p	FOX 47	Fox
47.2	720p	47+	Independent
47.3	480i	Bounce	Bounce TV
47.4	480i	Grit	Grit
47.5	480i	CourtTV	Court TV
47.6	480i	IonMyst	Ion Mystery
47.7	480i	BUSTED	Busted

=== Analog-to-digital conversion ===
WSYM-TV shut down its analog signal, over UHF channel 47, on June 12, 2009, as part of the federally mandated transition from analog to digital television. The station's digital signal remained on its pre-transition UHF channel 38 until January 17, 2020, when it relocated to channel 28 as a result of the 2016 United States wireless spectrum auction.
