= Channel 53 =

Channel 53 refers to several television stations:

== Canada ==
The following television stations operate on virtual channel 53 in Canada:

- CIVI-DT in Victoria, British Columbia

== Mexico ==
The following television stations operate on virtual channel 53 in Mexico:

- XHMNU-TDT in Monterrey, Nuevo León

== United States ==
The following low-power television stations, which are no longer licensed, formerly broadcast on analog channel 53 in the United States:

- KETK-LP in Lufkin, Texas

== See also ==
- Channel 53 virtual TV stations in the United States
