= WHTV =

Television station in Jackson, Michigan (1999–2017)

- Jackson–Lansing, Michigan; United States
- City: Jackson, Michigan
- Channels: Digital: 34 (UHF); Virtual: 18
- Branding: WHTV

Programming
- Affiliations: Defunct

Ownership
- Owner: Venture Technologies Group; (Spartan TV, LLC)

History
- Founded: March 25, 1993
- First air date: August 20, 1999
- Last air date: August 31, 2017; (18 years, 11 days)
- Former channel numbers: Analog: 18 (UHF, 1999–2008)
- Former affiliations: Bloomberg Television (1999–2000); Jewelry TV (1999–2000 and May−August 2017); UPN (2000–2006); MyNetworkTV (2006–May 2017)

Technical information
- Licensing authority: FCC
- Facility ID: 29706
- ERP: 185 kW
- HAAT: 288.6 m (947 ft)
- Transmitter coordinates: 42°22′25.6″N 84°4′10.2″W

Links
- Public license information: Public file; LMS

WHTV (channel 18) was a television station licensed to Jackson, Michigan, United States, which served the Lansing area. The station was owned by Venture Technologies Group and had studios on West Saint Joseph Street (along I-496) in downtown Lansing; its transmitter was located on M-52 in Lyndon Township, Washtenaw County (in the Detroit market).

Through its history, WHTV was mainly affiliated with UPN, followed by MyNetworkTV, and had a secondary affiliation with Jewelry TV that became primary several times. WHTV sold its spectrum in the Federal Communications Commission (FCC)'s incentive auction and ceased operations at 11:59 p.m. on August 31, 2017.

== History ==
The station signed on August 20, 1999, with programming from Bloomberg Television and Jewelry Television (then known as the America's Collectibles Network). It aired an analog signal on UHF channel 18 from a transmitter near Onondaga on the Ingham–Jackson county line. It became a UPN affiliate on October 16, 2000; prior to this, programming from that network was seen on area cable systems from Detroit's WKBD (channel 50; now a CW affiliate).

From 2002 until 2006, WHTV's internal operations (such as advertising sales) were housed at the studios of ABC affiliate WLAJ (channel 53), which was then owned by Freedom Communications, on South Pennsylvania Avenue in Lansing. It then relocated to the facilities of CBS outlet WLNS-TV (channel 6) on East Saginaw Street after entering into a joint sales agreement with WLNS' then-owner Young Broadcasting. While managed by Young, WHTV occasionally carried CBS programming preempted by WLNS, including the CBS Sports feed of the US Open Tennis Championship while WLNS aired the Jerry Lewis MDA Telethon on Labor Day, as well as programs preempted by WLNS in the event of a local special or breaking news. WHTV also occasionally carried Saturday NCAA football games from ABC when they conflicted with WLAJ's commitment to broadcast the ESPN Plus Big Ten football and basketball packages; this ended with the launch of the Big Ten Network for the 2007–2008 season.

WHTV's logo under its former MyNetworkTV affiliation

WHTV would place its digital transmitter at Van Atta Road in Meridian Charter Township. The station had a construction permit to substantially increase power and relocate its transmitter to a tower previously used by Detroit's Ion Television owned-and-operated station WPXD-TV in Lyndon Township. Essentially, the new transmitter would be located in the Detroit market but the station would continue to serve as a Lansing–Jackson market television outlet. The planned move date of its signal to the new antenna was scheduled to occur on November 1, 2012, but the parts delivery for the new transmitter was delayed until December 20.

On December 4, 2012, WLAJ was sold from the Sinclair Broadcast Group to Shield Media, LLC (owned by White Knight Broadcasting vice president Sheldon Galloway). Shield then entered into certain shared services and joint sales agreements with Young Broadcasting. At some point in February 2013, WLAJ moved from its studios into the WLNS facility. In effect, this move reunited WHTV's intellectual unit with WLAJ, due to WHTV's existing relationship with WLNS and its prior partnership with WLAJ. Young Broadcasting would merge with Media General on November 12, 2013. As a result of these changes, WHTV announced that it would not renew its operational outsourcing agreement with WLNS. In July 2014, it entered into a new local marketing agreement with WSYM and relocated its advertising sales operation to the Fox affiliate's studios.

In April 2017, WHTV announced that it would shut down on April 30, later revised to May 17, then May 31, and then August 31, following the Federal Communications Commission (FCC)'s incentive auction. The station sold its spectrum for $13,906,280. On May 1, WHTV dropped the MyNetworkTV affiliation and Scripps LMA with WSYM-TV and elected to air Jewelry Television in the interim, effectively discontinuing the 18.2 subchannel. After the final revision to their off-air date, the station signed off for the last time several minutes before midnight on August 31. WHTV's license was canceled at the station's request on September 11.

The programming which formerly aired on WHTV, including MyNetworkTV, remained in limbo for several months. On September 18, it was announced that WSYM would launch a fourth subchannel on October 9, containing both a MyNetworkTV affiliation and much of WHTV's previous programming.

== Programming ==
Syndicated programming on WHTV until May 1, 2017, included Two and a Half Men, The Middle, Jerry Springer, and Divorce Court among others. The only remaining non-Jewelry Television content until August 31, 2017, was E/I programming on weekday mornings.

== Technical information ==
=== Subchannel ===
Subchannel of WHTV
Subchannel	Res.	Short name	Programming
18.1	720p	WHTV	MyNetworkTV

=== Analog-to-digital conversion ===
WHTV shut down its analog signal, over UHF channel 18, on December 1, 2008. The station's digital signal remained on its pre-transition UHF channel 34, using virtual channel 18.
