= WAQP =

Television station in Saginaw, Michigan

- Saginaw–Bay City–Flint, Michigan; United States
- City: Saginaw, Michigan
- Channels: Digital: 36 (UHF); Virtual: 49

Programming
- Affiliations: 49.1: TCT; for others, see § Subchannels

Ownership
- Owner: Total Christian Television; (TCT of Michigan, Inc.)
- Sister stations: WTLJ

History
- First air date: March 26, 1985
- Former channel numbers: Analog: 49 (UHF, 1985–2009); Digital: 48 (UHF, 2006–2020)
- Former affiliations: TBN (1985–2007)

Technical information
- Licensing authority: FCC
- Facility ID: 67792
- ERP: 1,000 kW
- HAAT: 287 m (942 ft)
- Transmitter coordinates: 43°13′18″N 84°3′14″W

Links
- Public license information: Public file; LMS
- Website: www.tct.tv

WAQP (channel 49) is a religious television station licensed to Saginaw, Michigan, United States, serving east central Michigan. The station is owned by Total Christian Television (TCT). WAQP's transmitter is located near Chesaning, Michigan.

== Technical information ==
=== Subchannels ===
The station's signal is multiplexed:

Subchannels of WAQP
Subchannel	Res.	Short name	Programming
49.1	1080i	WAQP HD	TCT
49.2	480i	SBN	SonLife
49.3	480i	WEST	WEST
49.4	480i	LAFF	Laff
49.5	480i	CrtMyst	Ion Mystery
49.6	480i	Grit	Grit
49.7	480i	IONPlus	Ion Plus
49.8	480i	JTV	Jewelry TV
49.9	480i	BizTV	Biz TV
49.10	480i	TrueCri	True Crime Network
49.11	480i	GetTV	Great

=== Analog-to-digital conversion ===
WAQP ended regular programming on its analog signal, over UHF channel 49, on June 12, 2009, the official date on which full-power television stations in the United States transitioned from analog to digital broadcasts under federal mandate. The station's digital signal remained on its pre-transition UHF channel 48, using virtual channel 49. Its physical channel was later moved to 36.

=== Translators ===
WAQP previously operated a rebroadcaster on channel 27 in Lansing, which uses the callsign WLNM-LD. That channel was originally W69BJ (channel 69), but it relocated to channel 27 as W27CN in November 2003. Since July 2009, WLNM-LD has been broadcasting in digital-only format. The WLNM-LD digital broadcast uses the station's former analog channel 27 number, both in actual channel designation and via PSIP display, and mirrored the main WAQP broadcast. On February 14, 2020, TCT agreed to sell WLNM-LD to Gray Television for $175,000; the sale, which was completed on May 1, includes a lease agreement allowing TCT to program a WLNM subchannel for five years after closing (it was placed on the station's seventh subchannel). WLNM-LD now operates as a translator of NBC affiliate WILX-TV (channel 10) but with a different lineup of subchannels.

WAQP also originally had a repeater serving Jackson, W59CA (channel 59), which was relocated to Ann Arbor in November 2000 and renamed W27CJ (channel 27), repeating a low-power TCT station in Detroit, WDWO-CD. In October 2007, W27CJ was sold to SMG Media Group for $80,000, with the intent on operating the channel as "WFHD-LP"; that station, however, would soon go silent altogether.
