= Chicago Sports Network =

American regional sports network

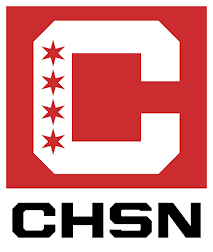
- Country: United States
- Broadcast area: Illinois, Indiana, Iowa, Kentucky, Michigan, and Wisconsin

Programming
- Language: English
- Picture format: 480i/720p/1080i HDTV over-the air and linear 4K UHDTV streaming and linear (TBD), select events

Ownership
- Owner: Standard Media; Chicago Blackhawks; Chicago Bulls; Chicago White Sox
- Key people: Jason Coyle, CEO

History
- Founded: 2024
- Launched: October 1, 2024; 2 years ago
- Replaced: NBC Sports Chicago
- Closed: June 9, 2025 (select OTA affiliates)
- Replaced by: Stadium (select OTA affiliates)

Links
- Webcast: www.chsn.com/feed
- Website: chsn.com

Availability

Streaming media
- DirecTV Stream: Internet Protocol television
- FuboTV: Internet Protocol television

Chicago Sports Network (CHSN) is an American regional sports network owned by Standard Media, the Wirtz Corporation, owner of the Chicago Blackhawks, and Jerry Reinsdorf, owner of the Chicago Bulls and White Sox franchises. It launched after the teams' contracts with NBC Sports Chicago expired on October 1, 2024.

The network is distributed via multiple platforms, including via subchannels of broadcast television stations within its teams' broadcast regions, agreements with pay television providers, and a direct-to-consumer app.

== History ==
In 2004, Jerry Reinsdorf, Bill Wirtz, and the Tribune Company—the owners of the Bulls and White Sox, Blackhawks, and Cubs respectively—formed a new regional sports network with Comcast known as Comcast SportsNet Chicago (later named NBC Sports Chicago). The network was jointly owned by the four teams, while Comcast held a 30% stake and handle operations. The Cubs departed the network after 2019, forming Marquee with Sinclair Broadcast Group as the exclusive broadcaster of all regional Cubs games; that same year, NBC Sports Chicago signed a five-year extension with the Blackhawks, Bulls, and White Sox, making it the exclusive home of all three teams through the end of the 2023–24 season.

In April 2024, the Chicago Sun-Times reported that the three teams were in negotiations with Stadium to assume their regional rights after the conclusion of their contract with NBC Sports Chicago. Stadium is owned by the White Sox's investment arm Silver Chalice and had previously been a joint venture with Sinclair until they sold their stake in 2023. In May 2024, The Athletic subsequently reported an agreement with Standard Media that would involve a newly launched multi-platform regional sports network; the Sun-Times later reported that Standard Media would primarily serve as a funding and distribution partner and that Stadium was to serve as the teams' new home.

On June 3, 2024, the three teams and Standard Media officially announced Chicago Sports Network, led by former Stadium CEO Jason Coyle. Unlike most regional sports networks, Chicago Sports Network is available over-the-air and through pay-TV and streaming services. Social media accounts used by NBC Sports Chicago transitioned to being operated by Chicago Sports Network at the end of that September.

== Programming ==
Chicago Sports Network holds the regional television rights to the Chicago White Sox of Major League Baseball, the NHL's Chicago Blackhawks, the NBA's Chicago Bulls and the NBA G League's Windy City Bulls. The network produces its pre-game and post-game shows in studios in the United Center and Rate Field.

Chicago Sports Network's flagship program is The Chicago Lead, a daily sports program covering all Chicago sports teams including local college and high school sports. In addition, the network also airs The Big College Football Show and The Big Pro Football Show, focusing on college football and the National Football League, respectively.

The network's common motif is using the six-pointed star and colors of Chicago's municipal flag within its graphical elements. The network attempted to switch to placing the Chicago team's score first within its debut game graphics (traditionally reserved for the visiting team in order to place 'Chicago's teams first', as was described on-air), but was switched back to the traditional visitor/home presentation after viewer feedback (and derision, especially when the Chicago team was behind and losing); the scoreboard, presented vertically in the top-left corner and obstructing the left basket on Bulls broadcasts, was also switched to a traditional bottom-right bug.

== Carriage ==
=== Pay-TV ===
On September 12, 2024, it was reported that the network was nearing its first carriage agreement with DirecTV that would have it taking over the channel positions formerly occupied by NBC Sports Chicago. On September 18, the agreement with DirecTV was confirmed. On September 30, the network reached an agreement with Astound RCN, and streaming service Fubo was added on October 25. The network was also added to NITCO in Northwest Indiana and MTCO, a small regional internet and streaming-TV provider in Central Illinois.

Carriage on Dish Network, which has shifted to refusing RSN carriage due to high distribution fees, is not expected to be pursued. Carriage on YouTube TV is also not expected to be pursued due to their lack of interest in re-adding RSNs four years prior.

On August 17, 2026, Chicago Sports Network became available as a paid add-on subscription through Amazon Prime Video.

==== Comcast negotiations ====
On October 10, 2024, it was reported that negotiations were ongoing between CHSN and Comcast, the Chicago area's primary cable TV provider. Both parties were unable to reach an agreement prior to the network's launch due to a dispute over tier placement. CHSN stated that it had reduced its fee to below what NBC Sports Chicago was receiving from Comcast but still had yet to receive an offer. As a result of the ongoing negotiations, CHSN had withheld its standalone streaming app, as CHSN believed its release would further hinder a deal with Comcast. By the end of October, CHSN had sent three offers to Comcast but received no offer in return, with its third offer including a move to Comcast's Ultimate tier and a much lower fee than NBC Sports Chicago's. In March 2025, a report in the Chicago Tribune suggested that Comcast was insisting on the discontinuation of CHSN's over-the-air broadcasts to finalize a deal. On June 4, 2025, it was announced that Comcast and CHSN agreed to a tentative deal to put CHSN on Comcast’s ultimate tier. The network launched on June 6 on the cable provider on channel 200, NBC Sports Chicago's former channel number.

=== Over-the-air ===
On September 15, 2024, Chicago Sports Network announced its over-the-air coverage in the Chicago market through a two-channel lease for the main channel and an overflow channel (both in 1080i high definition) on the digital subcarriers of WJYS (channel 62), a station licensed to Hammond, Indiana, with full-market coverage from the Willis Tower. The subchannels for CHSN via WJYS originally required an ATSC tuner that supports the more compact MPEG-4 video codec, but as a result of complaints WJYS switched to the more widely-available MPEG-2 in January 2025. Coverage on Gray Television stations in Rockford and South Bend were announced on October 1. Coverage on Family Broadcasting Corporation station WHMB in Indianapolis was announced on October 17.

Because the network's coverage area over-the-air outside the Chicago market conflicts with the rights to other teams, alternate blackout programming or a blank "Current programming not available" message is transmitted to those stations when games air. Only Chicago Blackhawks games air in Milwaukee due to conflicts with the Milwaukee Brewers, Milwaukee Bucks, and Wisconsin Herd. For the same reason, only Chicago Bulls game coverage airs in West Michigan due to the presence of Detroit's own teams, including the Tigers and Red Wings (the Bulls air in West Michigan due to the longtime availability of WGN-TV in the past over-the-air or via its superstation).

Mark Lazerus, the Blackhawks beat writer for The Athletic, claimed that CHSN's over-the-air signal in Chicago sometimes left much to be desired. Lazerus wrote that watching CHSN via channel 62 over-the-air required an antenna mounted in a high position aimed at Willis Tower. Even then, he said, the picture quality was "glitchier than scrambled late-night cable was in the 1980s." Lazerus added that the over-the-air signal was all but unviewable in rainy or windy conditions.

Due to conflicts with both a Bulls road game (against the Cleveland Cavaliers at Rocket Arena) and a White Sox road game (against the Cleveland Guardians in their home opener at Progressive Field), a CHSN-produced Blackhawks road game (against the Pittsburgh Penguins at PPG Paints Arena) on April 8, 2025 aired instead on WCIU-TV.

As a result of Comcast's agreement to carry the network, CHSN dropped all of its OTA affiliates within Illinois and some in the neighboring states at midnight on June 9, 2025. Some of its former affiliates replaced it with Stadium.

In April 2025, it was reported that WGN-TV was interested in carrying a subset of CHSN's games. An agreement was ultimately reached between WCIU and CHSN to simulcast seven White Sox games in 2025, which expanded to ten games the following season.

Chicago Sports Network transmitters
Market	Affiliate	Primary channel	Overflow channel	On-Air	References
Chicago, Illinois (Hammond, Indiana)	WJYS	62.2	62.3	No	
Rockford, Illinois	WSLN	19.3	19.4	No	
South Bend, Indiana	WNDU-TV	16.2	16.4	No	
Des Moines, Iowa	KDMI	19.3	—N/a	Yes	
Edgerton, Ohio (Angola, Indiana)	WINM	12.3	—N/a	No	
Fort Wayne, Indiana	WEIJ-LD	38.3	—N/a	No	
Cedar Rapids, Iowa	KWKB	20.5	—N/a	Yes	
Sioux City, Iowa	KMEG	14.5	—N/a	Yes	
Paducah, Kentucky	WDKA	49.7	—N/a	No	
Milwaukee, Wisconsin	WVTV	24.4	—N/a	Yes	
Grand Rapids, Michigan	WWMT	3.4	—N/a	Yes	
Peoria, Illinois	WHOI	19.4	—N/a	No	
Indianapolis, Indiana	WHMB-TV	40.2	40.6	Yes	

Grade A signal contours for stations affiliated with Chicago Sports Network. Blue contours are for active affiliates, and red contours are for former affiliates.

=== Direct-to-consumer streaming service ===
On November 14, 2024, CHSN unveiled its DTC streaming app with pricing set at $19.99 per month for one team or $29.99 per month for full access to the network, including non-team programming. The app also allows eligible pay-TV subscribers to use their pay-TV credentials.
