= WJMY =

WJMY may refer to:

- WJMY-CD, a low-power television station (channel 17, virtual 25) licensed to serve Tuscaloosa, Alabama, United States
- WJMY-TV, a defunct station that was to broadcast on channel 20 in Detroit, Michigan, United States
