= WXON =

WXON may refer to:

- WXON-LD, a low-power television station (channel 29, virtual 9) licensed to serve Flint, Michigan, United States; see List of television stations in Michigan
- WXON-LP, a defunct low-power television station (channel 54) formerly licensed to serve Flint, Michigan
- WMYD, a television station (channel 31, virtual 20) licensed to serve Detroit, Michigan, which held the call sign WXON-TV from 1968 to 1997
