= WLAJ =

Television station in Lansing, Michigan

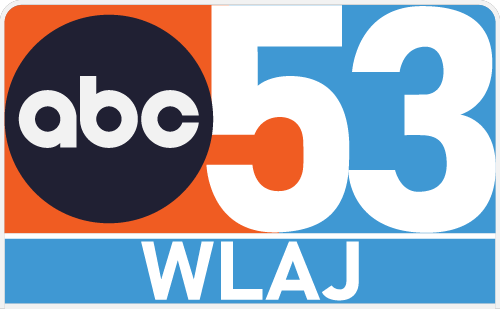

- Lansing–Jackson, Michigan; United States
- City: Lansing, Michigan
- Channels: Digital: 14 (UHF), shared with WLNS-TV; Virtual: 53
- Branding: ABC 53; Lansing CW5 (53.2)

Programming
- Affiliations: 53.1: ABC; 53.2: CW+

Ownership
- Owner: Mission Broadcasting, Inc.
- Operator: Nexstar Media Group
- Sister stations: WLNS-TV

History
- Founded: March 8, 1982
- First air date: October 13, 1990
- Former channel numbers: Analog: 53 (UHF, 1990–2009); Digital: 51 (UHF, 2002–2015); 25 (UHF, 2015–2020)
- Call sign meaning: Lansing and Jackson

Technical information
- Licensing authority: FCC
- Facility ID: 36533
- ERP: 950 kW
- HAAT: 289.8 m (951 ft)
- Transmitter coordinates: 42°41′19″N 84°22′35″W

Links
- Public license information: Public file; LMS
- Website: www.wlns.com/my-abc-is-wlaj/

WLAJ (channel 53) is a television station in Lansing, Michigan, United States, affiliated with ABC and The CW Plus. It is owned by Mission Broadcasting and operated by Nexstar Media Group along with CBS affiliate WLNS-TV (channel 6). The stations share studios on East Saginaw Street on Lansing's Eastside and transmit using WLAJ's spectrum from a tower on Van Atta Road in Okemos, Michigan.

A construction permit was granted for channel 53 in 1981 but remained dormant for almost a decade. Joel Ferguson, a Lansing developer and politician who had previously started WFSL-TV (channel 47) in 1982, bought the dormant permit in 1989 and signed WLAJ on for the first time on October 13, 1990. Ferguson quickly landed an affiliation deal with ABC after conforming channel 53's signal to protect nearby ABC affiliates in Detroit, Flint, and Battle Creek. This issue had stymied Ferguson's attempts to win an ABC affiliation for WFSL, leaving Lansing as one of the largest markets without full service from the Big Three networks.

The station started airing local newscasts shortly after signing on, but the newscasts failed to attract viewers and were discontinued after 17 months. Under the management of Granite Broadcasting and for most of the ownership of Freedom Communications, WLAJ produced local newscasts featuring more unconventional formats but could not pull viewers from the dominant WLNS-TV and WILX-TV, and the last independent newscast effort was discontinued in September 2009. Sinclair Broadcast Group acquired Freedom in 2012 but spun WLAJ off to Shield Media, which in turn entered into the shared services agreement with WLNS-TV. Channel 53 began airing simulcasts of that station's morning and evening newscasts. Mission Broadcasting, a company known for operating stations on behalf of Nexstar, acquired WLAJ from Shield in 2020.

== History ==
The Lansing–Jackson television market was dominated by two major commercial VHF stations, WJIM-TV (now WLNS-TV) on channel 6 and WILX-TV (channel 10), since the latter station began in 1959. In the late 1970s, interest emerged in activating a third local station on a UHF channel: channel 36, then allocated to Lansing. Three applicants had already filed for the channel by 1979. Benko Broadcasting was owned by two brothers, one of whom was a judge in Sanilac County; F&S Comm/News, primarily owned by former Lansing city councilman Joel Ferguson and business partner Sol Steadman; and Kare-Kim Broadcasting Corporation, whose primary stakeholder, Donald Haney, was a television personality in Detroit.

On August 4, 1980, the Federal Communications Commission (FCC) issued a ruling that complicated the picture for the channel 36 applicants. It changed the channel allocation from 36 to 47 as part of changes in five Michigan and Ohio cities, necessary to conform with a new Canadian table of allocations for UHF channels. This was not a trivial change for the Lansing applicants, as channel 47 was short-spaced with location restrictions. These restrictions, to channel 62 in Detroit, had led the FCC in 1967 to allot channel 36 instead of 47 at Lansing. In restoring channel 47 to Lansing, the FCC gave the existing applicants from the channel 36 case the opportunity to keep the short-spaced channel or specify Lansing's other UHF channel, channel 53. F&S Comm/News was the only applicant who chose channel 47 and received a construction permit in December 1981. The firm began broadcasting December 1, 1982, as WFSL, an independent station.

Benko and Kare-Kim opted for channel 53, and the FCC declared a comparative hearing for their applications in May 1981. In lieu of a hearing proceeding, the parties settled: Benko reimbursed Kare-Kim for $29,900 in expenses pursuing its application and came away with the permit in an agreement approved that December. Though Benko Broadcasting proposed in 1983 to build WLAJ as a second independent, owner Robert Benko fretted that competition with channel 47 would drive up prices for programming. Later, Charles McLravy, former owner of Lansing radio station WILS, became a stakeholder in Benko Broadcasting and built a transmitter building and 100 feet (30 m) of tower.

One of the reasons channel 36 had initially attracted interest was that at the time, Lansing was the largest market without an in-market ABC affiliate. At the time, WJRT-TV in Flint was reckoned as the default ABC affiliate in the capital; other parts of the market could watch the network over-the-air on WUHQ in Battle Creek or WXYZ-TV in Detroit. However, cable was often necessary to get a good ABC signal, particularly in Jackson. Ferguson had sought an ABC affiliation for WFSL when it launched, but ABC balked, principally due to significant signal overlaps with WXYZ-TV (which ABC owned at the time), WJRT, and particularly WUHQ. When the construction permit for channel 47 was awarded, the FCC dismissed a protest by WUHQ-TV, which sought to establish translators in Jackson and Lansing.

=== Construction, early years, and 53 Newsbeat ===
When I owned WSYM, we had a powerful signal. When I went to buy a station in Las Vegas, I realized I didn't need all that powerful stuff. Once the signal was out of the city, all there was was desert, anyway. So when I designed WLAJ, I cut the signal down to just the areas we are targeting. It will miss Battle Creek entirely.

— Joel Ferguson

On March 10, 1989, Benko Broadcasting filed to sell the WLAJ construction permit to Lansing 53, Inc., a company owned by Joel Ferguson. Ferguson and Steadman had sold WFSL less than five years earlier to The Journal Company, who changed the call letters to WSYM-TV. The sale came after McLravy decided he was not the right person to build the TV station. The reactivation of plans for channel 53 immediately started to unblock the ABC logjam. Neither ABC nor the newer Fox network had an affiliate in the Lansing market, and ABC was seen to be in the driver's seat with a choice of possible affiliates (WSYM or WLAJ).

The FCC granted final approval for the WLAJ sale in March 1990, leaving ABC with the decision between WSYM and WLAJ as its local affiliate. In a bid to court the network, Ferguson redesigned WLAJ's signal pattern to protect WJRT and WUHQ; this was successful, and on May 23, 1990, ABC awarded the Lansing affiliation to WLAJ. To set up Lansing's third TV news department, Ferguson hired former WLNS news director Bruce Cornelius; news anchor Warren Williams, a graduate of Lansing's Sexton High School and former student at Michigan State University, was hired to present channel 53's evening newscasts. Weeknight sports was presented by Mark Wilson, who had been a popular weekend sportscaster at WILX.

Grade A signal contours for WLAJ, WJRT, WOTV (the former WUHQ-TV) and WXYZ-TV, c. 1998. WLAJ's analog signal (blue) was intentionally engineered to not interfere with WJRT to the northeast, WUHQ to the west, and WXYZ-TV to the east.

From studios in the former Dambro's appliance store on Pennsylvania Avenue, WLAJ began broadcasting on October 13, 1990, with the highlight of its first day on air an ABC College Football telecast featuring Michigan versus Michigan State. Its debut led cable systems to remove another ABC affiliate from their lineups, with some choosing WUHQ and others WJRT. On October 29, the station aired its first 53 Newsbeat newscasts.

53 Newsbeat made little impact in the local television ratings. In its first ratings test, the November 1990 Arbitron survey, WLAJ's newscasts attracted less than 1% of the audience compared to 17% for WLNS and 14% for WILX. Williams was fired after less than a year before being rehired to report and host cut-ins during Good Morning America. Less than two months after instituting Saturday newscasts for the first time, WLAJ discontinued 53 Newsbeat on April 3, 1992. The newscasts were replaced with simulcasts of WXYZ's Action News. Ferguson cited the dismal ratings, even though he had decided to drop the newscast even before the latest ratings report came out. He also cited the cost savings and WXYZ's superior coverage of news events, including the Michigan state capitol. Wilson was the only news staffer whose contract had to be honored; he was retained to produce local sports inserts over WXYZ's early newscasts. Dave Hoger of the Jackson Citizen Patriot noted that 53 Newsbeat never quite rose to the level of its on-air presentation and that viewers had become very accustomed to the news on WLNS or WILX. According to Hoger, during its first two ratings periods, Nielsen was unable to rate WLAJ's newscasts because its viewership was too small to generate an adequate sample. At one point, its newscasts drew lower ratings than syndicated programming on WSYM. Wilson left for Detroit's WJBK a few weeks into the experiment. Cornelius stayed on to produce editorials before he was dismissed in January 1993. The WXYZ newscasts continued to air until June 1996; after the suspension and departure of star WXYZ anchorman Bill Bonds in 1995, ratings had fallen significantly for the simulcasts.

=== Ferguson to Granite to Freedom ===
In 1996, Ferguson sold almost half of WLAJ's stock to Paul Brissette, leading to speculation that channel 53 would enter a local marketing agreement (LMA) with WILX (which Brissette was selling at the time). Ferguson instead agreed to contract Granite Broadcasting to manage WLAJ; Granite had entered Michigan the year before by buying WWMT in Kalamazoo for $95 million, and that station's general manager assumed responsibility for WLAJ. Granite did not immediately buy WLAJ, valued at $19.4 million, because of the signal overlap between the Lansing and Kalamazoo stations.

Granite identified restoring a newscast as a top priority, promising $3 million in spending on the station including restoring news. ABC 53 News Now debuted on August 25, 1997. The newscast featured several staff transferred from WWMT, including anchor Joe Parker; it utilized a faster pace and dispensed with some traditional conventions, including a desk-based set and in-house weather forecasts. In its first ratings survey, the new ABC 53 News Now again failed to attract 1% of the audience. The contrast was increased by the debut weeks later of a 10 p.m. newscast at WSYM, which drew a 4% audience share.

Granite agreed to acquire KOFY-TV in San Francisco in late 1997. To fund the purchase, the company opted to sell WWMT and WLAJ to Freedom Communications for a total of $170 million. This transaction encountered a complication when the owner of the WLAJ transmitter site in Tompkins Township, claiming nonpayment of rent, threatened to evict the station, thereby forcing it off the air, if it were not paid $284,000 or if the station did not spend $2.1 million to buy the property outright. A Jackson County judge ruled that Granite had met the conditions of creditworthiness necessary to force Tompkins to agree to the transaction.

The half-hour News Now format was discontinued in January 2001 in response to continued low ratings. The 6 and 11 p.m. newscasts were reformatted as the ABC 53 News Express, a 10-minute newscast. The remainder of the half-hour was filled with a public affairs and debate program, On Point, also hosted by Parker. During this time, WLAJ served as the local sales representative for Lansing's WB 100+ station, "WBL", selling the commercials seen by local WB viewers on cable; it assumed this responsibility from WILX in 2000. It also managed WHTV (channel 18), the regional UPN affiliate, under an LMA with Venture Technologies Group; WHTV switched service providers to WLNS-TV in 2006. Some station operations moved from Lansing to WWMT in Kalamazoo in 2005.

In 2007, WLAJ hired Suzanne Wangler, known on air as Suzanne Page, to anchor its newscasts. Wangler had once been a weekend anchor at WILX before working at several positions in and out of television in Detroit. After WXYZ aired a report exposing her various legal issues, she resigned in February 2008. She hung herself days later after learning she faced indictment for embezzling money from a man she financially advised. The station expanded its early-evening news to an hour in October 2008 but reversed course and discontinued all longform local newscasts in September 2009, citing continued low ratings. WWMT continued to provide limited news breaks and weather.

=== Common operation with WLNS ===
Freedom announced on November 2, 2011, that it would bow out of television and sell its stations, including WLAJ, to the Sinclair Broadcast Group. The deal closed on April 2, 2012; on October 11, Sinclair filed to sell WLAJ to Shield Media (owned by White Knight Broadcasting vice president Sheldon Galloway) for $14.4 million. Shield immediately turned over operations to WLNS-TV and its owner, Young Broadcasting. Shield had previously bought WXXA-TV in Albany, New York, and outsourced its operations to a Young-owned station there. As WLNS was already managing WHTV, this gave Young operational control of three stations in the Lansing market. After FCC approval, the sale was completed on March 1, 2013.

After the sale to Shield was finalized, WLAJ moved its operations into WLNS-TV's studios. It began simulcasting newscasts from WLNS-TV at 6 and 11 p.m. and in mornings over the course of April 2013. WLNS management believed the simulcasts would expose additional viewers to their newscasts by offering ABC programming as a lead-in in addition to CBS programming and by way of WLAJ's better signal at the time in the southern portion of the market. WHTV, whose owner Spartan-TV objected to the WLAJ arrangement amid possible fears it would be pushed out, signed a new agreement with WSYM-TV in July 2014. During this time, WLNS-TV changed hands twice as part of larger transactions: Media General merged with Young in November 2013, and Nexstar Broadcasting Group acquired Media General in January 2017.

In 2017, WLNS sold its spectrum in the incentive auction for $13.6 million and entered into a channel sharing agreement with WLAJ, which began broadcasting WLNS from its transmitter on June 11, 2018. As a result of the repack to clear the 600 MHz band, the stations moved from channel 25 to channel 14 on January 17, 2020.

On August 21, 2020, it was announced that Mission Broadcasting would acquire WLAJ. The acquisition was completed on November 23.

== Technical information and subchannels ==
WLAJ and WLNS-TV broadcast from a tower on Van Atta Road in Okemos.

Subchannels of WLAJ and WLNS-TV
License	Subchannel	Res.	Short name	Programming
WLAJ	53.1	720p	WLAJ-DT	ABC
WLAJ	53.2	720p	WLAJ-DT	The CW Plus
WLNS-TV	6.1	1080i	WLNS-TV	CBS

== See also ==
- Channel 14 digital TV stations in the United States
- Channel 53 virtual TV stations in the United States
