= WDYR-CD =

Television station in Dyersburg, Tennessee (1999–2011)

Dyersburg, Tennessee; United States
- Channels: Digital: 18 (UHF); Virtual: 33

Programming
- Affiliations: Independent (1999–2000); All News Channel (secondary, 1999–2000?); TCT (2000–2011); Cornerstone Television (secondary)

Ownership
- Owner: Tri-State Christian Television

History
- Founded: 1995
- First air date: 1999
- Last air date: 2011
- Former call signs: W33BO (1995–1999); WDYR-LP (1999–2003); WDYR-CA (2003–2011)
- Former channel numbers: Analog: 33 (UHF, 1995–2011)
- Call sign meaning: Dyersburg

Technical information
- Licensing authority: FCC
- Facility ID: 17791
- ERP: 15 kW
- Transmitter coordinates: 36°3′28″N 89°26′19″W

Links
- Public license information: Public file; LMS

WDYR-CD (channel 33) was a low-power, Class A television station in Dyersburg, Tennessee, United States, owned and operated by Tri-State Christian Television. The station's studios were located on Upper Finley Road in Dyersburg.

== History ==
WDYR's application history began in 1995 under the callsign W33BO. The late Ray Ashley, Jr., senior law partner of law firm Ashley, Ashley & Arnold in Dyersburg and former Tennessee State Attorney General (1974–76) filed for the original application. Former Memphis TV news reporter Tommy Stafford, a friend of Ashley's, co-founded the station. By 1999, the station was on air and had launched a local news operation, titled Tri 33 News. The news aired at 6:30 a.m., 6 p.m. and 10 p.m. CT, including anchors that had left nearby television stations in Jackson, Memphis, and Paducah to start the newscast. The original anchors of the 6 p.m. newscast were Larry McIntosh (who formerly anchored in the Paducah market), Tiffany Carey, a former Jackson anchor, and the producer and weather anchor Carey Byars, who had previously reported nationally for the syndicated series AgDay. After a contentious meeting, original founders Ashley and Stafford found themselves at odds with shareholders in the company.

Outside shareholders had been brought in to give the station sufficient capitalization. However, some of these outside shareholders and the founders disagreed strongly on the direction the station should be headed. Ashley and Stafford did not feel their original vision was being followed. They left the board and eventually the company in early 2000. The news was gone by the summer of 2000, when the Tri-State Christian Television network acquired the station and began airing its network's programming, which was a mixture of Christian programming.

TCT surrendered WDYR's broadcast license in February 2013. The station is now defunct.

Before the station left the air, WDYR-CD carried all TCT network programming, along with some syndicated shows such as Bridging the Gap, Jack Van Impe Presents, A Bible Answer (originating from an area church in Paducah), Manna Fest, and a few others.

== Coverage area ==
In addition to its Dyer County coverage, WDYR was also available to antenna users in parts of Crockett, Lake and Obion counties in Tennessee, as well as in Caruthersville, Missouri. In Pemiscot County, Missouri, including the Steele area and Mississippi County, Arkansas, including the Osceola area, the station was available on cable television via NewWave Communications.
