= Matt Morrison =

American sportscaster

Matt Morrison is an American sportscaster now with CSN Bay Area. He previously worked for Fox Sports Net as anchor with both FSN Detroit and FSN Northwest.

== Baseball career ==
Morrison was a college baseball player at UCLA. He also played in the Single-A Northwest league before beginning his career in journalism.

== Journalism career ==
Morrison worked for CNN in Atlanta, GA where he was a sports anchor for Headline News and the now defunct CNN/SI sports network. His job also included the magazine program "Golf Portfolio" on CNBC, FSN South and FSN Arizona, and Fox NFL Sunday as well as NASCAR on Fox. Morrison worked his way up through local television stations KRTV in Great Falls, MT, WILX-TV in Lansing, MI, and WJXT-TV in Jacksonville, FL.
