= WTCT =

Television station in Marion, Illinois

- Marion–Harrisburg, Illinois; Paducah, Kentucky; Cape Girardeau, Missouri; United States
- City: Marion, Illinois
- Channels: Digital: 30 (UHF); Virtual: 27

Programming
- Affiliations: 27.1: TCT; for others, see § Subchannels

Ownership
- Owner: Total Christian Television; (Radiant Life Ministries, Inc.)

History
- First air date: August 1981 (Note: The Broadcasting and Cable Yearbook says August 16, while the Television and Cable Factbook says August 24.)
- Former call signs: WDDD-TV (1981–1984)
- Former channel numbers: Analog: 27 (UHF, 1981–2009); Digital: 17 (UHF, 2009–2020)
- Former affiliations: Independent (1981–1986); TBN (1986–2007)
- Call sign meaning: Total Christian Television

Technical information
- Licensing authority: FCC
- Facility ID: 67786
- ERP: 1,000 kW
- HAAT: 228.5 m (750 ft)
- Transmitter coordinates: 37°33′26″N 89°1′24″W

Links
- Public license information: Public file; LMS
- Website: www.tct.tv

WTCT (channel 27) is a religious television station licensed to Marion, Illinois, United States, serving the Paducah–Cape Girardeau–Harrisburg television market as the flagship station of the locally based Total Christian Television (TCT) network. WTCT's transmitter is located near Goreville, Illinois. The national feed of TCT via WTCT is available on DirecTV channel 377.

== History ==
The station signed on the air in August 1981 as independent station WDDD-TV. In 1984, its call letters were changed to WTCT. The station carried business news programming from the Financial News Network after the late movie each weeknight before sign-off until 1985. It became a TBN station in 1986 along with a few independent stations that switched to the religious network during that year. In 2007, the TCT network permanently dropped all TBN programming.

== Technical information ==
=== Subchannels ===
The station's signal is multiplexed:

Subchannels of WTCT
Channel	Res.	Short name	Programming
27.1	1080i	WTCT HD	TCT
27.2	480i	SBN	Sonlife
27.3	480i	Positiv	Positiv
27.4	480i	LAFF	Laff
27.5	480i	StartTV	Start TV
27.6	480i	StoryTV	Story Television
27.7	480i	Quest	Quest
27.8	480i	BuzzrTV	Buzzr
27.9	480i	OANPLUS	One America Plus
27.10	480i	ShopLC	Shop LC
27.11	480i	WEST	WEST

=== Analog-to-digital conversion ===
WTCT shut down its analog signal, over UHF channel 27, on June 12, 2009, the official date on which full-power television stations in the United States transitioned from analog to digital broadcasts under federal mandate. The station's digital signal remained on its pre-transition UHF channel 17, using virtual channel 27.

=== Former translators ===
WTCT previously broadcast on low-power translators W54AE (channel 54) in Paducah, Kentucky, KCGI-CA (channel 45) in Cape Girardeau, Missouri, and K54CA (channel 54) in Sikeston, Missouri; these translators ceased operation around 2010.
