= WTOM-TV (Lansing, Michigan) =

Television station in Lansing, Michigan (1953–1956)

- Lansing, Michigan; United States
- Channels: Analog: 54 (UHF)

History
- First air date: September 20, 1953
- Last air date: October 6, 1956
- Former call signs: WILS-TV (1953–1954)

Technical information
- ERP: 20 kW
- HAAT: 110 m (360 ft)
- Transmitter coordinates: 42°43′57″N 84°33′15″W

WTOM-TV (channel 54), known as WILS-TV from 1953 to 1954, was a television station in Lansing, Michigan, United States. It was the first UHF station to broadcast in Lansing. Originally owned and operated by radio station WILS (1320 AM), it was leased to other interests in 1954 and changed its call letters to WTOM-TV. Financial difficulties prompted the station to close in October 1956.

== History ==
=== WILS-TV ===
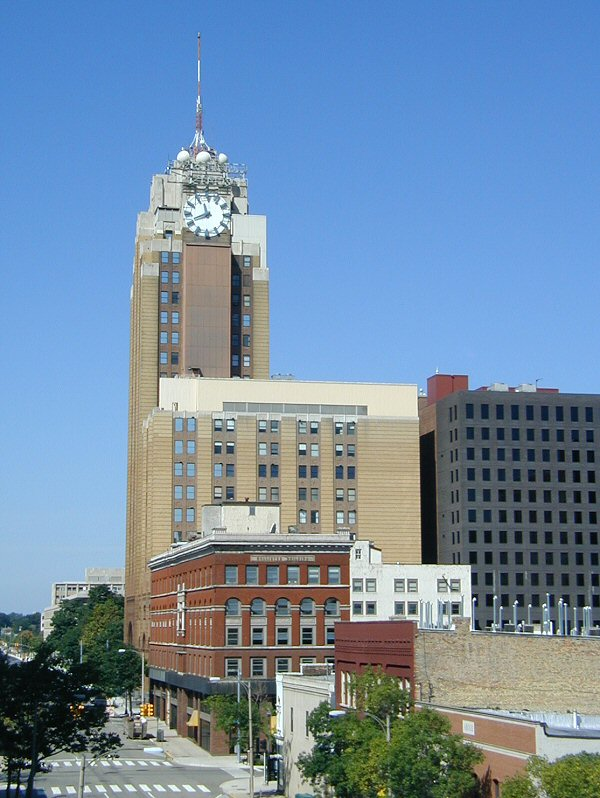
WILS-TV/WTOM-TV broadcast from the Boji Tower, then known as the Michigan National Bank Tower, in downtown Lansing

WILS-TV began broadcasting September 20, 1953. An affiliate of ABC and DuMont from day one, the station broadcast from studios at 407-11 Washington Avenue and a transmitter atop the Olds Tower/Michigan National Bank Tower—now known as the Boji Tower—downtown. The station received its network programming by a microwave relay from Detroit via a hop at Milford, as AT&T could not provide a direct connection to Lansing.

In addition to network fare, WILS-TV produced a number of its own local shows. At the outset, these included two children's shows, live news and sports reports, and a weather segment featuring a singing pianist girl, Barbara Austin, dressed appropriately for the next day's forecast.

While it was Lansing's first UHF television station in the days before the All-Channel Receiver Act (another, Michigan State College education outlet WKAR-TV channel 60, soon followed), the station boasted good conversion rates. In April 1954, the station manager claimed that 35 percent of Lansing-area sets had been converted.

=== WTOM-TV ===
In September 1954, WILS announced that it would lease channel 54 to Inland Broadcasting, which would change the station's call letters to WTOM-TV; WILS would lease the Washington Avenue studios to Inland for two years with an option to buy. The deal called for Inland to lease the television station for $500 to $5,000 a month, depending on station income. By early 1955, however, WTOM-TV had moved its studios into the Michigan National Bank Tower.

For WILS, the lease of channel 54 marked the start of a different television push. The Inland option to buy would only be valid if Television Corporation of Michigan, a group with close ties to WILS, received a license for the stronger VHF channel 10 at Parma–Onondaga, halfway between Lansing and the market's second-largest city, Jackson. TCM had applied for the license weeks earlier. The channel 10 application was unique in that the WILS group proposed to share the channel with Michigan State. It would be another four years before the application was approved, resulting in today's WILX-TV.

While WTOM-TV continued to operate under its new management, it found itself in an even more precarious position. Another threat came from the direction of Flint, where WJRT-TV channel 12 was under construction; WTOM-TV, alongside fellow UHF WKNX-TV of Saginaw and WWTV in Cadillac, unsuccessfully pleaded with the FCC to deny WJRT a site change that it had deemed necessary to secure network affiliation in Flint. In its pleading, WTOM-TV noted that the station feared the loss of its ABC hookup—shared with the market's larger VHF station, WJIM-TV (channel 6)—and had already seen a Detroit advertiser cancel a monthly contract. The station continued to produce local shows into 1956, including a 13-week program of bowling tournaments.

In late July, a complete reorganization of Inland was announced. A temporary receiver, John L. Mayer, was appointed to manage the station's affairs during reorganization, and he outlined plans to boost WTOM-TV's effective radiated power to 200,000 watts. Mayer was named permanent receiver in September; by the start of October, however, WTOM-TV was being reported as operating on a day-to-day basis while negotiations with creditors were made as to a potential sale of channel 54. One potential buyer, shopping center owner Francis J. Corr, paid operating expenses for seven days while he considered a bid, but he ultimately opted against buying the television station, and he withdrew the offer over the weekend of October 6–7, prompting it to go dark. At the time of its closure, WTOM-TV had $120,000 of unpaid bills and was $15,000 in arrears on federal and state taxes. It was the 66th television station—and 62nd UHF outlet—to suspend operations.

In January 1959, the FCC announced that WTOM-TV's license had expired without being renewed. The call letters were then claimed on March 16 by a new station being built at Cheboygan, Michigan.
