= WTLJ =

Television station in Muskegon, Michigan

WTLJ and W25GE-D
WTLJ: Muskegon–Grand Rapids, Michigan; W25GE-D: Kalamazoo, Michigan; United States
- Channels for WTLJ: Digital: 24 (UHF); Virtual: 54
- Channels for W25GE-D: Digital: 25 (UHF); Virtual: 26

Programming
- Affiliations: 54.1/26.1: TCT; for others, see § Subchannels

Ownership
- Owner: Total Christian Television; (Radiant Life Ministries, Inc./TCT of Michigan, Inc.)

History
- First air date: WTLJ: November 3, 1986
- Former call signs: W25GE-D: W24BO (1998); W26BX(-D) (1998–2016); WJGP-LD (2016–2026)
- Former channel number: WTLJ: Analog: 54 (UHF, 1986–2009); W25GE-D: Analog: 24 (UHF, until 2002), 26 (UHF, 2002–2009); Digital: 26 (UHF, 2009–2018)
- Call sign meaning: WTLJ: Witnessing the Love of Jesus; -or-; We Trust and Love Jesus

Technical information
- Licensing authority: FCC
- Facility ID: WTLJ: 67781; W25GE-D: 67780
- Class: W25GE-D: LD
- ERP: WTLJ: 310 kW; W25GE-D: 15 kW
- HAAT: WTLJ: 283 m (928 ft); W25GE-D: 138.4 m (454 ft)
- Transmitter coordinates: WTLJ: 42°57′25″N 85°54′7″W; W25GE-D: 42°07′43.8″N 85°20′22.1″W

Links
- Public license information: WTLJ: Public file; LMS; W25GE-D: Public file; LMS
- Website: www.tct.tv

WTLJ (channel 54) is a religious television station licensed to Muskegon, Michigan, United States, serving West Michigan. The station is owned by Total Christian Television (TCT). WTLJ's transmitter is located in Allendale Charter Township in Ottawa County, just southwest of Grand Valley State University. Its signal is relayed on translator station W25GE-D (channel 26; originally W24BO channel 24) in Kalamazoo.

Until June 2018, the station aired its own locally produced programs, Ask the Pastor and Down Home, from a studio adjacent to its transmitter. This ended with the elimination of the Federal Communications Commission (FCC)'s Main Studio Rule earlier in the year and a decision by TCT's operators to consolidate all programming operations at its headquarters in Marion, Illinois.

== History ==
The UHF channel 54 allocation in Michigan was originally assigned to Lansing. It was occupied by DuMont affiliate WILS, which later became WTOM-TV (call letters now used on channel 4 in Cheboygan), and was on the air from 1953 to 1956. The channel 54 allocation was then reassigned to Muskegon. Full-power station WMKG-TV broadcast for the first time on April 3, 1967 at 5:30 p.m. from the Occidental Hotel in downtown Muskegon. That station, which operated as an independent station and relied heavily on live, local programming, had left the air by 1971, following the abrupt closure of the station.

In January 1983, WTLJ was originally assigned the call letters WMKT with the intention of focusing on the Muskegon and Holland areas. That station was never built (Muskegon has its own station, WMKG-CD, which fulfills this purpose).

On November 3, 1986, Springfield, Ohio–based Miami Valley Christian Television launched WTLJ, as a Christian-oriented independent station. The station would eventually be sold to its present owners, Tri-State Christian Television. The history of its Kalamazoo repeater, WJGP-LD, is unknown, other than the fact that its application to move its signal from UHF channel 24 to channel 26 was approved in December 1998; the channel switch occurred in January 2002 to facilitate WTLJ's eventual digital channel 24.

The station was receivable in analog on the western shore of Lake Michigan in the Wisconsin cities of Sheboygan and Milwaukee because of channel 54's transmitter being close to the Lake Michigan shore, although TCT does not explicitly market to those cities or have any cable coverage. With the termination on March 4, 2009, of the analog channel 24 signal of Milwaukee's WCGV, the station's digital signal is also easily picked up in Wisconsin.

WTLJ is carried on AcenTek systems serving Buckley, Copemish, Hoxeyville, Mesick, Old Mission, South Boardman, and Thompsonville (all located in the Traverse City market).

WTLJ formerly collaborated with the Ottawa County Department of Corrections to allow probationers to operate the station to receive community service credits and complete their sentences.

== Technical information ==
=== Subchannels ===
The stations' signals are multiplexed:

Subchannels of WTLJ and W25GE-D
Subchannel		Res.	Short name	Programming
WTLJ	W25GE-D	Res.	Short name	Programming
54.1	26.1	720p	WTLJ HD	TCT
54.2	26.2	480i	SBN	SonLife (4:3)
54.3	26.3	480i	HSTV	Healing Streams TV (4:3)
54.4	26.4	480i	STORY	Story Television (4:3)
54.5	26.5	480i	MOVIES	Movies! (4:3)
54.6	26.6	480i	SHOPLC	Shop LC (4:3)
54.7	26.7	480i	DABL	Dabl (4:3)
54.8	26.8	480i	BUZZR	Buzzr (4:3)
54.9	26.9	480i	WEST	WEST (4:3)
54.10	26.10	480i	JTV	Jewelry TV (4:3)
54.11	26.11	480i	ONTV4U	OnTV4U (infomercials) (4:3)

=== Analog-to-digital conversion ===
WTLJ shut down its analog signal, over UHF channel 54, on June 12, 2009, as part of the federally mandated transition from analog to digital television. The station's digital signal remained on its pre-transition UHF channel 24, using virtual channel 54.
