= Total Christian Television =

American religious broadcast network

- Country: United States
- Affiliates: See below

Ownership
- Owner: TCT Ministries, Inc. (a non-profit church corporation)

History
- Launched: May 20, 1977; 49 years ago
- Founder: Garth and Tina Coonce
- Former names: Tri-State Christian Television (1977-2007)

Links
- Website: TCT Network

Availability

Terrestrial
- Available in select areas: see chart below

Streaming media
- Internet Channel 1: TCT-SD
- Internet Channel 2: TCT-HD/TCT Family
- Internet Channel 3: TCT-SD2 Kids
- Internet Channel 4: TCT-SD3/Aramaic Broadcast Network

TCT Ministries, Inc., doing business as Total Christian Television (a.k.a. TCT; also commonly referred to as TCT Network; formerly Tri-State Christian Television) is a religious television network in the United States.

TCT includes traditional televangelism, talk shows, children-oriented programming such as TCT Kids (used to meet E/I mandates), Southern gospel music, and feature films with Christian themes. TCT has an international service, TCT World, which broadcasts in over 170 countries.

== History ==
It was founded in 1977 as a single Cincinnati television station under the original "Tri-State Christian Television" TCT branding serving the Tri-state area by spouses Garth and Tina Coonce. Then, from the mid-1980s up until 2007, TCT was an affiliate of the Trinity Broadcasting Network (TBN). Upon its parting from TBN in 2007, its branding changed to the current "Total Christian Television" TCT branding. The network currently maintains a relationship with the Christian Broadcasting Network, airing that network's flagship program The 700 Club twice daily as well as CBN's nightly newscast.

In June 2018, TCT ended local operations at all of its owned-and-operated stations, consolidating all of its stations into a single national feed. The change came after the Federal Communications Commission lifted its Main Studio Rule, which had required broadcast stations to have a local studio.

== Television network affiliates ==
=== TCT-owned stations ===
- WFBD channel 48, Destin, Florida / Mobile, Alabama
- WBIH channel 29, Selma / Montgomery, Alabama
- KDOC-TV channel 56, Anaheim / Los Angeles, California
- KTNC-TV channel 42, Concord / San Francisco, California
- KAIL channel 7, Fresno, California
- WIGL-LD channel 38, Athens / Atlanta, Georgia
- WSCG channel 34, Baxley / Savannah, Georgia
- KXTF channel 35, Twin Falls, Idaho
- WTCT channel 27, Marion, Illinois (Flagship station)
- WINM channel 12, Angola, Indiana
  - WEIJ-LD channel 38 Fort Wayne, Indiana (repeater of WINM)
- KDMI channel 19, Des Moines, Iowa
- KWKB channel 20, Iowa City, Iowa
- WTLJ channel 54, Muskegon / Grand Rapids, Michigan
  - WJGP-LD channel 26, Kalamazoo, Michigan (repeater of WTLJ)
- WAQP channel 49, Saginaw / Flint, Michigan
- KONC channel 7, Alexandria, Minnesota
- KCWV Channel 27, Duluth, Minnesota
- WFXW channel 15, Greenville, Mississippi
- WWJX Channel 23, Jackson, Mississippi
- WNYB channel 26, Jamestown / Buffalo, New York
  - WNIB-LD channel 42, Rochester, New York (repeater of WNYB)
- WLXI-TV channel 43, Greensboro, North Carolina
- WRAY-TV channel 30, Wake Forest / Raleigh / Durham, North Carolina
- WRLM channel 47, Canton / Akron / Cleveland, Ohio
- WACP channel 4, Philadelphia, Pennsylvania / Atlantic City, New Jersey
- KTTW channel 7, Sioux Falls, South Dakota
  - KTTM channel 12 Huron, South Dakota (repeater of KTTW)
- WTWV channel 23, Memphis, Tennessee
- WWTW channel 34, Senatobia, Mississippi
- KPNZ channel 24, Salt Lake City, Utah
- KBCB channel 24, Bellingham, Washington / Vancouver, British Columbia

=== TCT affiliates ===
- KZTN-LD channel 20.2, Boise, Idaho (owned by Celebration Praise, LLC)
- WLNM-LD channel 29.7, Lansing, Michigan (owned by Gray Television; former O&O repeater of WAQP)
  - WILX-TV channel 10.7, Lansing, Michigan (owned by Gray Television)
- K36NN-D channel 38.1, West Plains, Missouri (part-time affiliation; owned by Promised Land Ministries)
- WOCB-CD channel 39.1, Marion, Ohio (owned by Central Ohio Association of Christian Broadcasters)
- WGTB-CD channel 28.1, Charlotte, North Carolina (part-time affiliation, owned by Word of God Broadcasting Network)
- KPLE-CD channel 31.1, Killeen, Texas (owned by Killeen Christian Broadcasting Corporation)

=== Former TCT-owned or affiliated stations ===
- W23EM-D channel 23.1, Ceiba, Puerto Rico (now translator of WCCV-TV)
- WBNF-CD channel 15.1, Buffalo, New York (repeater of WNYB, now owned by HME Equity Fund II and operating as a Spanish Catholic station)
- WDYR-CD channel 33, Dyersburg, Tennessee (now defunct)
- WJFB channel 44.6, Lebanon/Nashville, Tennessee (affiliation discontinued on November 11, 2020, after a change in ownership.)
- WMDV-LD channel 44, Danville, Virginia (now an independent station)
- WDWO-CD channel 18.4, Detroit, Michigan (now MovieSphere Gold affiliate)
