= KDMI =

Television station in Des Moines, Iowa

- Des Moines, Iowa; United States
- Channels: Digital: 19 (UHF); Virtual: 19

Programming
- Affiliations: 19.1: TCT; for others, see § Subchannels

Ownership
- Owner: Total Christian Television; (Radiant Life Ministries, Inc.)

History
- First air date: August 28, 2006
- Former channel numbers: Digital: 56 (UHF, 2006–2009)
- Former affiliations: America One (2006–2009); MyNetworkTV (2006–2009, secondary 2011–2014); This TV (2009–2016)
- Call sign meaning: Des Moines, Iowa

Technical information
- Licensing authority: FCC
- Facility ID: 78915
- ERP: 839 kW; 1,000 kW (application)
- HAAT: 610 m (2,001 ft)
- Transmitter coordinates: 41°49′48″N 93°36′54.6″W

Links
- Public license information: Public file; LMS
- Website: www.tct.tv

KDMI (channel 19) is a religious television station in Des Moines, Iowa, United States, owned by Total Christian Television (TCT). The station's transmitter is located in Alleman, Iowa. KDMI maintained studios on Southwest 7th Street in downtown Des Moines until TCT ended local operations in June 2018.

== History ==
KDMI signed on August 28, 2006, as an America One affiliate. MyNetworkTV programming was added upon its launch on September 5. As MyNetworkTV's prime time lineup only aired six days a week for two hours, America One programming was retained in all other timeslots. By the fall of 2007, KDMI began carrying some first-run syndicated programs, including Family Feud and TMZ on TV.

In 2009, America One was dropped in favor of This TV; the station initially discontinued the MyNetworkTV affiliation following its conversion to a programming service (one program from the service, WWE SmackDown, then aired on KCWI-TV until September 11, 2010, when the program moved to cable channel Syfy later that October). Outside of some syndicated programming, KDMI's schedule was then filled solely by This TV; however, as of October 3, 2011, KDMI re-affiliated with MyNetworkTV, although the station aired the service's programming from 11 p.m. to 1 a.m. (some nights from 11:30 p.m. to 1:30 a.m., depending on the length of one of This TV's second prime time movie broadcasts). KDMI dropped MyNetworkTV once again after September 27, 2014; the MyNetworkTV affiliation was later moved to a subchannel of KCCI on December 1, 2014.

The KDMI call letters were previously used for two different radio stations in Des Moines. From 1960 to 1994 they were used at 97.3 FM, a Christian radio station owned by Buddy Tucker. After 97.3 became KHKI, the KDMI call letters were moved to 1460 AM before that station became KXNO at the beginning of 2001.

On January 6, 2016, Pappas Telecasting filed to sell KDMI to Tennessee non-profit corporation Dove Broadcasting, Inc., for $1 million. Although TCT began operating the station on March 14 under a local marketing agreement (LMA), the sale was formally consummated on April 27. Prior to the sale's closing, it was one of the few television stations in the country to carry the This TV network affiliation on its primary channel.

== Subchannels ==
The station's digital signal is multiplexed:

Subchannels of KDMI
Subchannel	Res.	Short name	Programming
19.1	720p	KDMI HD	TCT
19.2	480i	SBN	SonLife (4:3)
19.3	720p	CHSN	CHSN
19.4	480i	JTV	Jewelry TV (4:3)
19.5	480i	Buzzr	Buzzr (4:3)
19.6	480i	ShopLC	Shop LC (4:3)
19.7	480i	GDT	Good Day TV (4:3)
19.8	480i	BizTV	Biz TV (4:3)
