= Channel 53 virtual TV stations in the United States =

The following television stations operate on virtual channel 53 in the United States:

- K42IH-D in East Wenatchee, Washington
- KETD in Castle Rock, Colorado
- KGEB in Tulsa, Oklahoma
- KMSG-LD in Fresno, California
- KNXT-LD in Visalia, California
- W23FC-D in Eau Claire, Wisconsin
- WCDN-LD in Cleveland, Ohio
- WDTA-LD in Atlanta, Georgia
- WEDN in Norwich, Connecticut
- WFLI-TV in Cleveland, Tennessee
- WKGB-TV in Bowling Green, Kentucky
- WLAJ in Lansing, Michigan
- WLMF-LD in Miami, Florida
- WMWC-TV in Galesburg, Illinois
- WPAN in Fort Walton Beach, Florida
- WPGH-TV in Pittsburgh, Pennsylvania
- WQMY in Williamsport, Pennsylvania
- WTTD-LD in Hampton, Virginia
- WUDW-LD in Richmond, Virginia
- WWHO in Chillicothe, Ohio
