= WINM =

Television station in Angola, Indiana

WINM and W17EX-D
WINM: Angola, Indiana; W17EX-D: Fort Wayne, Indiana; United States
- Channels for WINM: Digital: 12 (VHF); Virtual: 12
- Channels for W17EX-D: Digital: 17 (UHF); Virtual: 38

Programming
- Affiliations: 12.1/38.1: TCT; for others, see § Subchannels

Ownership
- Owner: Total Christian Television; (Tri-State Christian Television, Inc.)

History
- First air date: WINM: April 22, 1983; W17EX-D: November 30, 1988
- Former call signs: WINM: WXJC-TV (1983–1984); WBKZ (1984–1986); W17EX-D: W66BD (1988–2004); W43CF (2004–2009); W38EA-D (2009–2016); WEIJ-LD (2016–2026)
- Former channel number: WINM: Analog: 63 (UHF, 1983–2009); Virtual: 63 (2009–2011); W17EX-D: Analog: 66 (UHF, 1988–2004), 43 (UHF, 2004–2009); Digital: 38 (UHF, 2009–2020)
- Former affiliations: WINM: TBN (primary 1983–1991, secondary 1991–2007); W17EX-D: TBN (primary 1988–1991, secondary 1991–2007)

Technical information
- Licensing authority: FCC
- Facility ID: WINM: 67787; W17EX-D: 67788
- ERP: WINM: 16.5 kW; W17EX-D: 15 kW
- HAAT: WINM: 177.6 m (583 ft); W17EX-D: 177.3 m (582 ft)
- Transmitter coordinates: WINM: 41°27′15″N 84°48′10″W; W17EX-D: 41°6′13″N 85°11′28″W

Links
- Public license information: WINM: Public file; LMS; W17EX-D: Public file; LMS
- Website: www.tct.tv

WINM (channel 12) is a religious television station licensed to Angola, Indiana, United States, serving the Fort Wayne area. The station is owned by Total Christian Television (TCT). WINM's transmitter is located in unincorporated Williams County, Ohio (in the Toledo market), near the Indiana state line, midway between Butler, Indiana, and Edgerton, Ohio. Though most of the city proper is adequately covered by the main signal, WINM is relayed in Fort Wayne on digital translator W17EX-D (channel 38).

WINM maintained studios on Butler Road in Fort Wayne (in the former studio facility of PBS member station WFWA, channel 39) until TCT ended local operations in June 2018. Despite Angola being WINM's city of license, the station maintains no physical presence there.

== History ==
The station first signed on the air as WXJC-TV on April 22, 1983, originally affiliated with the Trinity Broadcasting Network. In 1984, the station's call sign was changed to WBKZ; it was changed again to WINM in 1986, when the station was purchased by Manna for Modern Man Ministries. Quad M Productions, as it was called, was fully owned by Calvary Temple Worship Center, a charismatic megachurch in Fort Wayne, and solely run by the family of church founder Paul Paino. The studio facilities were located in the old Calvary Temple location on Clinton Street in Fort Wayne. After encountering financial problems, the station filed for bankruptcy and shut down. The license was purchased in 1991 by TCT, who began producing their own part-time network feed of religious programming, and began airing it on their owned-and-operated stations. TCT fully disassociated with TBN in April 2007.

On February 27, 2004, the call letters of WINM's Fort Wayne translator, previously W66BD, were changed to W43CF and correspondingly, was moved to UHF channel 43. The repeater later moved to digital channel 38 and had its call sign changed to W38EA-D.

== Technical information ==
=== Subchannels ===
The station's signal is multiplexed:

Subchannels of WINM and W17EX-D
Channel		Res.	Short name	Programming
WINM	W17EX-D	Res.	Short name	Programming
12.1	38.1	720p	WINM-HD	TCT
12.2	38.2	480i	SBN	SonLife (4:3)
12.3	38.3	480i	WEST	WEST (4:3)
12.4	38.4	480i	COZI TV	Cozi TV
12.5	38.5	480i	IONPLUS	Ion Plus (4:3)
12.6	38.6	480i	JTV	Jewelry TV (4:3)
12.7	38.7	480i	TOONS	MeTV Toons (4:3)
12.8	38.8	480i	GDT	Infomercials (4:3)
12.9	38.9	480i	ONTV4U	OnTV4U (4:3)
12.10	38.10	480i	BIZ TV	Biz TV (4:3)
12.11	38.11	480i	SHOPLC	Shop LC (4:3)

=== Analog-to-digital conversion ===
WINM shut down its analog signal, over UHF channel 63, on June 12, 2009, the official date on which full-power television stations in the United States transitioned from analog to digital broadcasts under federal mandate. The station's digital signal remained on its pre-transition VHF channel 12, using virtual channel 63, but was remapped to virtual channel 12 in 2011.
