= WDWO-CD =

Television station in Detroit

- Detroit, Michigan; United States
- Channels: Digital: 22 (UHF); Virtual: 18

Programming
- Affiliations: see § Subchannels

Ownership
- Owner: Innovate Corp.; (HC2 Station Group, Inc.)

History
- Founded: April 13, 1989
- First air date: December 2, 1993
- Former call signs: W44AR (1993–1995); WDWO-LP (1995–2003); WDWO-CA (2003–2011)
- Former channel numbers: Analog: 44 (UHF, 1993–1999), 18 (UHF, 1999–2010); Digital: 18 (UHF, 2010–2019)
- Former affiliations: TCT (2000–2019; later on 18.4); Azteca América (2019–2022); Visión Latina (2022–2024)
- Call sign meaning: Detroit World Outreach (original owner)

Technical information
- Licensing authority: FCC
- Facility ID: 68444
- Class: CD
- ERP: 15 kW
- HAAT: 240 m (787 ft)
- Transmitter coordinates: 42°29′1″N 83°18′44″W

Links
- Public license information: Public file; LMS

WDWO-CD (channel 18) is a low-power, Class A television station in Detroit, Michigan, United States, affiliated with the diginet Defy. The station is owned by Innovate Corp., and maintains a transmitter on West 11 Mile Road in Southfield, Michigan.

== History ==
The station was founded on April 13, 1989, but did not sign on until December 2, 1993, as W44AR (channel 44), owned by a local religious organization, Detroit World Outreach.

The station went silent in July 1999, due to CBS owned-and-operated station WWJ-TV (channel 62) starting up its digital signal on that channel, but returned to the air on Channel 18 on February 25, 2000, under TCT ownership. The station was sold, apparently because DWO could not afford to keep the station, or endure any expenses to move the channel.

The station also had a rebroadcaster on channel 27 in Ann Arbor. That channel was originally W59CA (channel 59), a repeater of Saginaw's WAQP, serving Jackson, which was relocated to Ann Arbor in November 2000 and renamed W27CJ. In November 2007, the repeater was sold to SMG Media Group and the call sign changed to WHDA-LP, and later to WFHD-LP, which soon went silent. Plans were for the station to broadcast all local programming from Ann Arbor in 100% high definition digital format.

In March 2013, TCT filed to sell WDWO-CD to LocusPoint Networks. The deal would have put the station under common ownership with another Detroit religious station, WUDT-LD; the sale of WDWO-CD closed on May 31, 2013, while LocusPoint's acquisition of WUDT-LD remains pending as of February 2017. Upon purchase by LocusPoint, the station moved its antenna from Dearborn to WKBD-TV's tower in Southfield. TCT agreed to reacquire WDWO-CD from LocusPoint in February 2017.

== Technical information ==
=== Subchannels ===
The station's signal is multiplexed:

Subchannels of WDWO-CD
Subchannel	Res.	Short name	Programming
18.1	720p	WDWO-CD	Defy
18.2	480i	WDWO-CD	NBC True CRMZ
18.3	480i	WDWO-CD	Confess
18.4	480i	WDWO-CD	MovieSphere Gold
18.5	480i	WDWO-CD	NTD America
18.6	480i	WDWO-CD	365BLK
18.7	480i	WDWO-CD	Black Vision TV
18.8	480i	WDWO-CD	Oxygen
18.9	480i	WDWO-CD	Hasbro Legends
18.10	480i	WDWO-CD	Newsmax2
18.11	480i	WDWO-CD	QVC 365
18.12	480i	WDWO-CD	Infomercials (4:3)

On July 30, 2010, the station converted to digital on channel 18 with an effective radiated power of 15 kW (slightly lower than its analog ERP of 20 kW), but retained its -CA suffix (and branding itself as "WDWO-DT").

At one point afterward, WDWO-CD broadcast three video feeds: 18.1 broadcast in SD, and carried some local programs in addition to the network feed. 18.2 broadcast in HD, and carried the network programming. The two feeds aired most of the same shows at the same times, but occasionally had different schedules. 18.3 was added in the last week of January 2011, and aired mostly older public domain sitcoms and cartoons, and a block of TCT-made E/I programming called TCT Kids. In June 2011, WDWO-CD, like many other TCT stations, added SD3, La Fuente (The Source), a Spanish-language religious service, available on 18.4.

On June 20, 2019, WDWO moved its TCT affiliation to a reactivated 18.4, with Azteca América taking over on 18.1, returning non-English-language broadcast network programming to Detroit for the first time since May 2017, when WHNE-LD dropped its LATV affiliation. On the same date, a fifth feed was launched, 18.5 (soon changed to 1.1), broadcasting 3ABN programming.

== Coverage area ==
WDWO's over-the-air signal is viewable throughout the city of Detroit, as well as in Highland Park, Hamtramck, parts of Windsor, and many nearby suburbs as far north as Romeo, as far west as Ypsilanti, and as far south as Trenton; with a high quality antenna, it can be seen as far north as Metamora, as far west as Pinckney, and as far south as Monroe.

== See also ==
- Media in Detroit
