= WTMJ =

- WTMJ-TV, a television station (channel 32, virtual 4) licensed to Milwaukee, Wisconsin, United States
- WTMJ (AM), a radio station (620 AM) licensed to Milwaukee, Wisconsin, United States
- WKTI, a radio station (94.5 FM) licensed to Milwaukee, Wisconsin, United States, which used the call sign WTMJ-FM from 1959 to 1974
- WTMJ-FM, a radio station (93.3 FM) licensed to Milwaukee, Wisconsin, United States, which was deleted in 1950
