= WPAG-TV =

Television station in Ann Arbor, Michigan (1953–1957)

- Ann Arbor, Michigan; United States
- Channels: Analog: 20 (UHF)

Programming
- Affiliations: Defunct

Ownership
- Owner: Washtenaw Broadcasting
- Sister stations: WPAG-AM

History
- First air date: April 3, 1953
- Last air date: December 31, 1957 (4 years, 272 days)
- Former affiliations: DuMont (1953–1956); Independent (1956–1957)
- Call sign meaning: Paul and Art Greene

Technical information
- ERP: 17.063 kW visual, 9.595 kW aural
- HAAT: 84 m (274 ft)

WPAG-TV (channel 20) was a television station in Ann Arbor, Michigan, United States, which operated from 1953 to 1957.

== History ==
WPAG-TV signed-on April 3, 1953, making it both Washtenaw County's first TV station and the first UHF station in Michigan (Saginaw's WKNX-TV, now WEYI-TV, signed on two days later).

WPAG-TV was owned by the same people (Washtenaw Broadcasting) who operated WPAG radio (now WTKA). Art Greene (president) and Edward Baughn (general manager) were listed as both owning 50% of the station's stock (by 1957, Baughn would own 100% of the station); studios were located in downtown Ann Arbor, in the same building as the radio station. As of 1955, WPAG-TV broadcast during the evening hours only, from 6 p.m. to 11:30 p.m., although they did sometimes operate in the afternoon hours to carry Detroit Tigers games, apparently as a backup to WJBK-TV in Detroit.

WPAG-TV was nominally an independent station, but is believed to have been at least a part-time DuMont affiliate. After the demise of DuMont, the station allowed the University of Michigan to supply educational programming. In later years, ABC provided such programs as The Adventures of Ozzie and Harriet and Sky King; the station also added a five-minute local newscast on weeknights, featuring WPAG radio's Dave Prince reading wire service copy. Channel 20 even managed a ten-fold increase in power (to 17,500 watts) in late 1955, but there were still few UHF viewers in the expanded 30-to-40-mile (48–64 km) coverage radius around Ann Arbor.

On December 31, 1957, WPAG-TV suspended operations after a failed attempt to get an allocation for Channel 12 in Flint, Michigan (apparently unaware that WJR radio in Detroit already held a construction permit for this frequency), with the ownership claiming to have lost $145,680 over the previous four years. The license for Channel 20 was later assigned to WJMY-TV in Allen Park, which broadcast for eight months in 1962–63; they later aired a series of test signals in the late 1960s before finally giving up their license in 1970. WMYD has held the frequency since 1972.

After WPAG's demise, Ann Arbor would not see another TV station for a generation; WUOM-TV, to be operated by the University of Michigan, was assigned a construction permit for Channel 26 in 1953, but never made it to the air. Finally, in 1981, independent WRHT signed on; it is now WPXD-TV, an affiliate of Ion Television.

Preceded by none	Channel 20 Detroit occupant 1953-1957	Succeeded by WJMY-TV
