= WMKG-CD =

Television station in Muskegon, Michigan

- Muskegon, Michigan; United States
- Channels: Digital: 31 (UHF); Virtual: 31
- Branding: TV 31

Ownership
- Owner: WMKG-TV, LLC

History
- Founded: 1989
- First air date: April 1, 1990
- Former call signs: W40AK (1989–1995); WMKG-LP (1995–2009); WMKG-CA (2009–2014)
- Former channel numbers: Analog: 40 (UHF, 1990–2001), 38 (UHF, 2001–2014); Digital: 49 (UHF, 2014–2020); Virtual: 38
- Former affiliations: UATV (until 2006); The Sportsman Channel (until 2009); FamilyNet; Pursuit Channel (until 2011); The Family Channel
- Call sign meaning: Muskegon (may also be derived from the ICAO airport code of nearby Muskegon County Airport)

Technical information
- Licensing authority: FCC
- Facility ID: 33869
- Class: CD
- ERP: 7 kW
- HAAT: 32.4 m (106 ft)
- Transmitter coordinates: 43°10′33.1″N 86°12′43.2″W

Links
- Public license information: Public file; LMS
- Website: wmkg.com

WMKG-CD (channel 31) is a low-power, Class A television station in Muskegon, Michigan, United States, owned by WMKG-TV, LLC. The station's studios are located on Airline Road in Norton Shores near the junction of I-96 and US 31.

== History ==
The station was founded by Bud Kelley and his family in 1989 as 'TV Channel 40', with the call sign W40AK. It first went on the air on April 1, 1990, at 5:30 pm, originally broadcasting on channel 40. The call letters were changed to WMKG-LP in 1995. It moved to channel 38 in 2004. In September 2006, Comcast cable dropped the station from its analog channel lineup to allocate more bandwidth for video on demand services. Currently, the station is available on digital cable and broadcasting on 49, but displayed virtual channel 38 until that system malfunctioned; it then used channel 49 for display of its channels.

The station held the LP calls until October 2009, when it acquired Class A status to become WMKG-CA. Despite the station's low-power status, its location near Lake Michigan assures amplification of their signal across the lake into the Milwaukee market within the Port Washington and Sheboygan areas (Milwaukee itself is served by low-power station WTSJ-LD on channel 38). The station was issued its license for digital operation on October 10, 2014, at which point it changed its call sign to WMKG-CD.

The station has had several minor network affiliations throughout its history, and currently affiliates with The Family Channel; this is a duplicative affiliation within the Grand Rapids market, as WLLA (channel 64) also carries that network over their main subchannel.

According to an MLive.com article dated December 25, 2016, "Channel 49.1—channel 397 on cable—broadcasts family-oriented shows and Muskegon programs including churches and square dancing. Channel 49.2 broadcasts religious music. Channel 49.3 shows movies. Channel 49.4 has a western theme."

== Original programming ==
The station has produced original programming from the start. Programs include Dial A Bargain, a show where a viewer calls in for gift certificates, and Muskegon Today, a local program dealing with issues involving the city. Other programs include Table Talk, The Doorstop Nation, and TV BINGO.

For most of its history, the station also had a local newscast airing at 5:30 pm. However, it is no longer on the air.

== Station sale after a decade ==
In October 2007, Kelley Enterprises put the station up for sale, including the license and equipment, citing that the owner is retiring and has plans to move south. As of 2008, the station's license is still in Kelley's name, per FCC records. Late 2009 the station was sold to BAG LLC of New York and the sale was approved by the FCC., but BAG LCC of New York failed to show up to the closing. In 2009 the station was placed back on the market. In December 2016, the station was for sale on Craigslist; the owner was quoted by MLive.com as saying "It's past my retirement time."

Kelley was finally successful in selling the station in June 2017, when he sold it to Steve Kanzer, the principal of VRVC, LLC, a virtual venture capital fund and a western Michigan native residing in Florida with a summer lakeside home in Norton Shores. Kanzer plans to update the station's operations to digital standards, along with using its post-spectrum move to channel 31 to its advantage, rebranding it in connection with US 31, which runs up the Lake Michigan shoreline, including an older style "31" highway shield as its new logo.

== Subchannels ==
The station's signal is multiplexed:

Subchannels of WMKG-CD
Channel	Res.	Short name	Programming
31.02	480i	WMKG-CD	[Blank] (4:3)
31.04	480i	WMKG-CD	Classic Shows (4:3)
31.06	480i	WMKG-CD	[Blank] (4:3)
31.08	480i	WMKG-CD	Classic Shows (4:3)
31.10	480i	WMKG-CD	Classic Shows (4:3)
