= WJMY (TV) =

Television station in Allen Park, Michigan (1962–1963)

- Allen Park, Michigan; United States
- Channels: Analog: 20 (UHF)

Programming
- Affiliations: Independent

Ownership
- Owner: Triangle Broadcasting; (1962–1964); United Broadcasting; (1964–1970)

History
- Founded: 1962
- First air date: October 7, 1962
- Last air date: June 10, 1963; (246 days)

WJMY-TV was an independent television station that broadcast on channel 20 in Detroit, Michigan, United States, licensed to Allen Park. For many years, it was widely believed that WJMY never made it to the air at all except for a test signal consisting merely of a card displaying its calls and city-of-license in 1968. Additional research by Victor Edward Swanson and K. M. Richards in 2015, however, revealed this to be incorrect: WJMY was actually on the air for just over eight months, from October 7, 1962, to June 10, 1963. The station was the second to operate on channel 20 in southeastern Michigan; the channel had previously been home to Ann Arbor–based WPAG-TV in the 1950s.

After ceasing operations, the station was acquired by United Broadcasting Company, which was able to secure new technical facilities but lacked the capital to build the studio or actually launch the station. United sold the construction permit to the owners of WXON, which operated on channel 62, in June 1972; WXON moved to channel 20 on the WJMY construction permit that December.

== History ==
=== Early years ===
The Rev. Dr. Robert M. Parr, founder of the Gilead Baptist Church, filed for the channel 62 allocation in Allen Park on September 20, 1960 (as well as an FM station at 98.3 MHz). Both stations were to carry his initials in their call letters as WRMP. However, a month after receiving the construction permit for the FM station, he instead acquired a construction permit for a higher-power FM station at 98.7 licensed to Detroit (which went to air in 1961 as WBFG). Since FCC rules at the time disallowed common use of call letters between stations with different cities of license, channel 62 was renamed WJMY on May 8, 1961. Parr then filed to move channel 20 from Ann Arbor to Allen Park, modifying his permit to operate on that channel.

On October 7, 1962, WJMY began operations, and the Detroit Free Press began including its listings. Station manager Henry Vanden Bosch stated channel 20 was only operating two hours nightly (7:00 to 9:00 p.m.) with "travel and information films", augmented by a weekly broadcast of the 1953 series The Air Force Story. On Sundays, WJMY aired a block of "gospel films" from noon to 2:00 p.m. Channel 20 also aired such one-off specials as Trial For Tara, a production of the Catholic Church about St. Patrick's victory over paganism in Ireland, and the US Navy-produced The John Glenn Story to commemorate the first anniversary of his spaceflight. Dr. Parr's son-in-law, Theron Spurr, offered five-minute sermons right before sign-off each night. Ratings were minuscule, though, and on June 10, 1963, WJMY suspended operations.

=== Going dark ===
Parr died on January 22, 1964. That July, Richard Eaton and his United Broadcasting Company, specialists in African-American radio and owners of WOOK-TV in Washington, D.C., as well as several TV construction permits, acquired the WJMY permit for $115,000. In order to provide substantially improved coverage of the metropolitan area compared to the previous WJMY facilities, United arranged to lease space on WKBD-TV's new tower in Southfield, Michigan, then under construction. Plans were discussed for channel 20 to carry programming aimed at the Polish and black communities in Detroit.

However, United continually lacked capital to construct studios, both for WJMY and for its Baltimore sister station, which would not sign on until 1967 as WMET-TV. The Free Press reflected the continual delays, reporting in June 1965 that there was no air date for channel 20; in January 1967, the paper stated it would air that fall, and after having missed that date, WJMY was said to be planned for a late 1968 debut. However, tests were made periodically of the new transmitting facilities, which apparently produced the long-held belief that WJMY never transmitted anything except a slide bearing their call letters and city of license.

Plans may have seemed more concrete by 1968, when talk of a studio complex in the 11 Mile Road area was mentioned. So too, however, was the competition. On September 15, 1968, channel 62, under the ownership of real estate developer Aben Johnson Jr., began operations as Detroit's second commercial independent WXON (licensed to Walled Lake), which had eyed the Southfield transmitter site before building its own. Just as channel 20 seemed closer to air—a studio groundbreaking and fall opening were mentioned in May and the station was said to be ready by September 15 if the studio was—United announced the sale of WJMY to United Artists for nearly $925,000 in September.

The United Artists sale fell apart in 1970, as United Broadcasting began to face continued legal issues stemming from the 1969 challenges to its Washington radio and TV stations. In late 1970, Eaton instead filed to sell the WJMY construction permit to WXON, which planned to move from channel 62 to channel 20 with little change in programming, for the $413,832 it had accumulated in out-of-pocket expenses. Land mobile interests pushed back against the sale, seeking that channel 20 be reassigned for their use in metro Detroit. The FCC approved the move in June 1972, and WXON moved from channel 62 to channel 20, using the former WJMY construction permit, on December 9, 1972.
