= Onondaga, Michigan =

- Unincorporated community
- Location within the state of Michigan Location within the United States
- Coordinates: 42°26′39″N 84°33′44″W
- Country: United States
- State: Michigan
- County: Ingham
- Township: Onondaga
- Settled: 1870
- Elevation: 902 ft (275 m)
- Time zone: UTC-5 (Eastern (EST))
  - Summer (DST): UTC-4 (EDT)
- ZIP code(s): 49264
- Area code: 517
- GNIS feature ID: 634074

Onondaga is an unincorporated community in the U.S. state of Michigan. The community is located within Onondaga Township in Ingham County.

As an unincorporated community, Onondaga has no legally defined boundaries or population statistics of its own but does have its own post office with the 49264 ZIP Code. The Onondaga 49264 ZIP Code serves the majority of the township, as well as smaller areas in Hamlin Township to the west and Tompkins Township to the south.

The community is centered along the Grand River approximately 20 miles (32 km) south of Lansing and 15 miles (24 km) northwest of Jackson.

== History ==
European-American settlement began in the mid-19th century, with most migrants coming from New England and New York. The township and community were named after the Haudenosaunee nation of Onondaga, historically based in New York.

A post office was first established at the place about 1844, with Perez Howland as the first postmaster. In 1847, Perez Howland built a grocery. A post office was operated from the grocery. Cyrus Baldwin subsequently purchased the building and converted it into the "Onondaga Hotel".

The first store of any consequence in the place was established in 1867 by John Sherman. The European-American plat of the village of Onondaga was laid out by John Sherman and others, on July 13, 1870. Several buildings had previously been erected, but the place dates its permanent growth from this time.

It was also about that date that the Grand River Valley division of the Michigan Central Railroad was built through the town, which brought more settlers and businesses Sherman donated land for the depot.

The first church, called the First Congregational Church of Onondaga, was built in 1877.

Onondaga is the city of license for Lansing's NBC affiliate WILX-TV, and has its transmitter just west of the community.
