= Hamlin Township, Eaton County, Michigan =

Hamlin Township, Michigan
- Township
- Location within the state of Michigan
- Coordinates: 42°28′11″N 84°39′46″W
- Country: United States
- State: Michigan
- County: Eaton

Area
  - Total: 34.4 sq mi (89.2 km^{2})
  - Land: 34.3 sq mi (88.8 km^{2})
  - Water: 0.15 sq mi (0.4 km^{2})
- Elevation: 928 ft (283 m)

Population (2020)
  - Total: 3,227
  - Density: 94.1/sq mi (36.3/km^{2})
- Time zone: Eastern
- FIPS code: 26-36200
- GNIS feature ID: 1626424
- Website: https://hamlineatonmi.gov/

Hamlin Township is a civil township of Eaton County in the U.S. state of Michigan. The population was 3,227 at the 2020 census.

== Communities ==
- Charlesworth

== Geography ==
According to the US Census Bureau, the township has a total area of 34.5 square miles (89 km^{2}), of which 34.3 square miles (89 km^{2}) is land and 0.2 square miles (0.52 km^{2}) (0.46%) is water.

== Demographics ==
As of the 2000 United States census, there were 2,953 people, 1,045 households, and 848 families in the township. The population density was 86.1 inhabitants per square mile (33.2/km^{2}). There were 1,088 housing units at an average density of 31.7 per square mile (12.2/km^{2}). The racial makeup of the township was 96.82% White, 0.27% African American, 0.24% Native American, 0.27% Asian, 0.03% Pacific Islander, 0.88% from other races, and 1.49% from two or more races. Hispanic or Latino of any race were 1.90% of the population.

There were 1,045 households, out of which 40.0% had children under the age of 18 living with them, 71.0% were married couples living together, 6.1% had a female householder with no husband present, and 18.8% were non-families. 14.5% of all households were made up of individuals, and 4.4% had someone living alone who was 65 years of age or older. The average household size was 2.83 and the average family size was 3.12.

The township population contained 29.6% under the age of 18, 5.7% from 18 to 24, 30.4% from 25 to 44, 25.6% from 45 to 64, and 8.7% who were 65 years of age or older. The median age was 37 years. For every 100 females, there were 98.5 males. For every 100 females age 18 and over, there were 98.7 males.

The median income for a household in the township was $57,473, and the median income for a family was $61,838. Males had a median income of $43,648 versus $26,194 for females. The per capita income for the township was $23,931. About 2.0% of families and 2.6% of the population were below the poverty line, including 3.0% of those under age 18 and none of those age 65 or over.
