= WILX-TV =

Television station in Onondaga, Michigan

- Onondaga–Lansing–Jackson, Michigan; United States
- City: Onondaga, Michigan
- Channels: Digital: 10 (VHF); Virtual: 10
- Branding: WILX 10; News 10

Programming
- Affiliations: 10.1: NBC; for others, see § Subchannels

Ownership
- Owner: Gray Media; (Gray Television Licensee, LLC)
- Sister stations: WSYM-TV

History
- First air date: March 15, 1959
- Former channel numbers: Analog: 10 (VHF, 1959–2009); Digital: 57 (UHF, until 2009)
- Call sign meaning: Derived from WILS radio; Ingham County, Lansing, X (Roman numeral for 10)

Technical information
- Licensing authority: FCC
- Facility ID: 6863
- ERP: 30 kW
- HAAT: 298.5 m (979 ft)
- Transmitter coordinates: 42°26′33″N 84°34′21″W
- Translator(s): WLNM-LD 29.1 Lansing

Links
- Public license information: Public file; LMS
- Website: www.wilx.com

WILX-TV (channel 10) is a television station licensed to Onondaga, Michigan, United States, serving as the NBC affiliate for the Lansing area. It is owned by Gray Media alongside Fox affiliate WSYM-TV (channel 47). The two stations share studios on American Road (near I-96) in Lansing; WILX-TV's transmitter is located in Onondaga. It is also rebroadcast on WLNM-LD (channel 29) in the immediate Lansing area.

The second VHF allocation in south-central Michigan was assigned to Onondaga, almost halfway between Lansing and Jackson, in 1954. This triggered a battle among five groups from Lansing and Jackson which sought the channel. Two of them had operated unsuccessful UHF stations in the Lansing area: Lansing Broadcasting, owner of radio station WILS and former owner of WILS-TV (channel 54), and Michigan State University (MSU), owner of WKAR-TV (channel 60). The two groups jointly presented the Federal Communications Commission (FCC) with a proposal, believed to be the first of its kind, to share time between a commercial station and an MSU-operated educational station. After several years of legal battles at the FCC and in Michigan court, channel 10 began broadcasting on this basis on March 15, 1959. The commercial station was WILX-TV, an NBC affiliate owned by the Television Corporation of Michigan, a group with close ties to WILS, with its main studio in Jackson. It leased the transmitter facility from MSU, which operated an educational station for 38 hours a week as WMSB. The arrangement lasted more than 13 years and was ended in 1972, when MSU built the present WKAR-TV on channel 23.

Television Corporation of Michigan sold WILX-TV to A-T-O Communications, later Figgie Communications, in 1978, in the first of five sales in 25 years. The station, long an also-ran in market news ratings, made its first credible showing by poaching sportscaster Tim Staudt from long-dominant WJIM-TV (channel 6, now WLNS-TV). WILX-TV pulled nearly even, though it continued to be hamstrung by the increasing split of station personnel and resources between Lansing and Jackson. After channel 6 poached two senior executives from channel 10 in 1986, the station's news ratings decreased during the ownership of Adams Communications and Brissette Broadcasting. Under those two companies, the station migrated all of its operations to Lansing in two phases between 1990 and 1993.

WILX overtook WLNS for the first time in the final months of Benedek Broadcasting ownership before Gray acquired the station in 2002. Its local newscasts have continued to be competitive in the market, regularly trading the ratings lead with WLNS. In 2026, Gray acquired WSYM-TV, which WILX had previously helped run in the 2000s and 2010s.

== Allocation and construction of channel 10 ==
In 1953, two companies—Sparton Broadcasting and the Jackson Broadcasting and Telecasting Corporation—requested that the Federal Communications Commission (FCC) assign channel 10 to Parma, Michigan, while a third—Triad Association—requested its assignment to the nearby community of Onondaga, south of Lansing. The commission made the assignment to Parma and Onondaga in January 1954, denying a competing bid to place channel 10 at Coldwater. The site was necessary to maintain proper spacing to other channel 10 stations at Milwaukee; Columbus, Ohio; and London, Ontario.

With the assignment in place, the FCC took applications for channel 10. Booth Radio and Television Stations (owner of Jackson radio station WIBM), Triad, and Jackson Broadcasting and Telecasting (owner of Jackson radio station WKHM) all applied. The fourth bid came from the Television Corporation of Michigan (TCM), a firm with close ties to Lansing Broadcasting, owner of Lansing radio station WILS. At the time, WILS was operating WILS-TV (channel 54), an early ultra high frequency (UHF) station. The fifth and final applicant for channel 10 was Michigan State College, which sought approval to build a commercial station. The college was already experienced in educational television. It owned the Lansing area's other UHF television station, WKAR-TV (channel 60).

In September 1954, TCM and Michigan State College combined their bids after the former company made a proposal for a shared-time operation. Under the new proposal, the college would build the facility and lease it to Television Corporation of Michigan. The two groups, each with separate licenses, would broadcast at different times each day; the Michigan State station would be on air 38 hours a week, only slightly less than WKAR-TV was operating. The proposal came at a time when both groups were disappointed by their UHF television stations in Lansing. WILS was selling channel 54, while Michigan State officials had discovered viewers were not buying the converters needed to view UHF stations at the rate they had hoped, crimping the effectiveness of channel 60. According to John Pomeroy, president of WILS and TCM, the Michigan State–TCM petition called for the station to broadcast with the maximum high-band very high frequency (VHF) power of 316,000 watts from a 1,000-foot (305 m) tower. This would provide at least secondary coverage within 70 miles (113 km) of Parma–Onondaga, including Lansing proper. In 1955, Armand L. Hunter, the director of educational television at Michigan State College, noted that the existing operation of channel 60 did not justify the $300,000 annual expense to operate it. The college's entrance into the channel 10 proposal led to some concern by state legislators that Michigan State was entering into competition with private broadcasters; college officials stated that the station would not be built with tax dollars and that the university would recoup its investment in the form of lease payments to Television Corporation of Michigan.

FCC hearings in the long-running case concluded in October 1956. Hearing examiner Annie Neal Huntting handed down her initial decision on March 7, 1957. It favored the joint bid of Michigan State (which had recently been elevated to university status (Note: Michigan State College was renamed Michigan State University (MSU) by a bill signed into law on April 21, 1955, and effective that July 1.)) and the Television Corporation of Michigan. The losing applicants mounted nearly two years of appeals to the FCC and Michigan courts. The matter was heard by the commission in April 1958; Booth, Triad, and Jackson Broadcasting and Telecasting argued the proposed station would feature a "mish-mash" of cultural and commercial programs, citing the scheduling of programming on world philosophy next to The Lone Ranger.

In May 1958, the FCC denied the appeals and awarded a tentative construction permit to Michigan State University for the construction of the channel 10 facility. With this tentative approval in hand, MSU shut down WKAR-TV on channel 60 the next month, with president John A. Hannah announcing the university would not return to the air until channel 10 was completed. MSU received formal FCC approval for channel 10 after a split commission decision on September 3. The university signaled it would be able to provide educational television programs in a much wider area from channel 10 than it had from channel 60. The companies initially planned to telecast under the call letters they had used on the UHF band—WILS-TV and WKAR-TV—but the FCC assigned them the call signs WFTV and WMSB, respectively. The WFTV designation was quickly changed to WILX-TV.

The university swung into the process of taking bids for construction. Its progress was soon halted by continued appeals from the losers, this time in Michigan courts. Acting on a petition from the Jackson Broadcasting and Telecasting Corporation, a circuit judge in Jackson enjoined MSU from awarding construction contracts in late October. The Jackson firm's petition contended that the MSU plan to issue revenue bonds to finance construction and pay them back with the proceeds from the lease to Television Corporation of Michigan violated the Michigan state constitution and a condition on legislative appropriations to the university. MSU emerged victorious when the circuit judge lifted his temporary restraining order, and the FCC denied last appeals made by Jackson Broadcasting and Telecasting. During construction, on January 9, 1959, a 28-year-old tower worker from Decatur, Illinois, fell 450 feet (140 m) to his death when rigging gave way.

== The shared-time years ==
Channel 10 debuted on March 15, 1959. WMSB was the first station to greet viewers with a dedication program from its East Lansing studios, but high winds caused the microwave link to be unreliable and the picture to be described as "jumpy" by the Jackson Citizen Patriot. Later that afternoon, after a 90-minute outage when wind knocked down a power line, WILX-TV made its debut from its studio in Jackson, inside the former coffee shop of the Hotel Hayes. The station was an NBC affiliate, with a schedule incorporating 30 network programs not previously seen in the Lansing area. It was reportedly the first shared-time operation between a commercial broadcaster and an educational broadcaster in the nation.

In June, WILX opened its second local studio, in Battle Creek's Wolverine Tower. The final appeal by Jackson Broadcasting and Telecasting against the channel 10 arrangement was dismissed by the Michigan Supreme Court in 1960.

WILX received FCC approval to build a new radio station in Jackson, which began broadcasting as WJCO (1510 AM) on January 19, 1963. The new radio station briefly shared channel 10's facility in the Hotel Hayes. That May, Television Corporation of Michigan broke ground on a studio complex on Springport Road in Blackman Township, to which WILX-TV moved that October. The original broadcasting schedule between the stations was modified in 1965 to permit WILX-TV to air The Huntley–Brinkley Report while granting WMSB additional time on Sundays and Mondays.

In 1968, Michigan State University and WMSB each experienced a change in leadership. Robert Page became the university station's new manager shortly before Clifton R. Wharton Jr. was named MSU's new president. By that time, circumstances in public broadcasting and UHF reception had changed. There was more programming available to public television stations in the wake of the Public Broadcasting Act of 1967, while the All-Channel Receiver Act meant that all new TV sets could receive UHF stations. WMSB, barred from most evening broadcasting in its shared-time arrangement, could not reach a family audience; its early evening window, from 6 to 7:30 p.m., attracted few viewers against newscasts on competing stations. Page began to lobby Wharton and the MSU administration for a full-time public television station. The university filed for channel 23 in East Lansing in November 1970, and the FCC approved in 1971 after the university received a federal grant. MSU agreed to sell the Onondaga transmitting facility to Television Corporation of Michigan for $1.7 million, funding the university would use for capital improvements to its television facilities. On September 10, 1972, WMSB and the revived WKAR-TV broadcast 23 This Way, a special celebrating the opening of the new educational station.

== A-T-O and Adams ownership ==
Television Corporation of Michigan opted to sell its broadcast properties to separate buyers in 1978. WILX-TV was sold for $12 million to A-T-O Communications, a Los Angeles–based subsidiary of A-T-O Inc. in Willoughby, Ohio. The subsidiary had been formed the year prior and given $30 million to buy broadcast stations. A-T-O renamed itself Figgie International in 1981 because of confusion with French company ATO Chimie and the Alpha Tau Omega fraternity, and A-T-O Communications became Figgie Communications.

Figgie never acquired any other broadcast stations, and it sold the station in 1983 to Stephen Adams of Minneapolis. In approving the transaction, the FCC rejected petitions from the Jackson city council and new Lansing independent station WFSL-TV. The petitions concerned the relocation of the station's primary facilities from Jackson to Lansing. A clause in the sale agreement to Adams stipulated that the company build a new studio and office building in Lansing within two years. By that time, the station had long sought to move its operations to Lansing; most of its news staff was already based there. The studio project did not come to fruition at that time.

Under A-T-O and Adams, WILX made its first move toward being competitive in the Mid-Michigan television market, long dominated by WJIM-TV (channel 6). While most of its news and sales staffers were based mostly in Lansing, its main studio was still in Jackson, 37 mi (60 km) away; the station ran three to four shuttles a day between the two cities. Mike Hughes of the Lansing State Journal described it as "the second station in a one-station town". In the late 1970s, channel 10 hired sportscaster Tim Staudt away from channel 6. Suddenly, WJIM-TV went from dominating WILX-TV three-to-one in the ratings to being nearly even. The station then hired a second WJIM-TV employee, newsman Howard Lancour, to serve as lead anchor and news director. Lancour, considered too old, was dismissed in 1983; by this time, its ratings were just narrowly behind WJIM. The station's competitive stretch waned after channel 6 was sold and renamed WLNS-TV. Channel 6's new owners hired away general manager Ronald Kwasnick and general sales manager Thomas Hartman in 1986. While WILX posted its best total-day ratings shortly after their departure, using the programming purchased by Kwasnick, WLNS rebounded in ratings and maintained a solid lead in sales. Meanwhile, WILX fell off while WLNS entered into a "plush period" with high ratings for its newscasts.

== Brissette and Benedek ownership ==
Adams Communications purchased the television station holdings of Wesray Capital Group in 1988, but the deal left Adams highly leveraged and ill-prepared to confront declines in the value of broadcast properties, prompting it to default on $283 million of debt in 1991. Brissette Broadcasting was formed the next year when Paul Brissette, who had been the vice president of Adams Communications's television stations division, bought out the business for $257 million.

The financial and ownership changes at Adams coincided with a key move for WILX-TV. In 1990, the station built a 5,000-square-foot (460 m^{2}) studio and office on American Road in south Lansing, replacing an earlier office site on Pennsylvania Avenue. After an uncertain period in which Brissette put the station on the market and let key syndicated programs Jeopardy! and Wheel of Fortune go, the station dropped its 5:30 p.m. newscast, and union troubles emerged, WILX-TV was taken off the market in 1993, and Brissette instead invested in expanding the American Road facility to serve as the station's only studio and reunite the staff split between Lansing and Jackson. The company hired away WLNS's general manager and made sports anchor Staudt the news director in addition to his anchoring duties. Brissette also hired anchors from larger markets to present the new, Lansing-based newscasts. Roger McCoy had been an anchor for WKBD-TV in Detroit, but the station was demoting him; Liz Talbot had been left without a job after WVTV in Milwaukee shut down its news department. In 1995, the station reinstated its 5:30 p.m. news program and added a noon newscast.

Brissette's group of stations was acquired by Benedek Broadcasting in 1996. Under Benedek, the station's newscasts continued to rate in second place behind WLNS-TV. In 1998, citing an uncertain economy, general manager David Cornelius scrapped the noon newscast and converted several full-time staffers to part-time in an effort to cut costs; one official with the United Auto Workers local that represented employees believed the cuts amounted to a union-busting effort.

== Gray ownership ==
In the early 2000s, financial problems developed at Benedek. The early 2000s recession reduced ad sales and caused the company to be unable to pay interest on a set of bonds issued in 1996, prompting a filing for Chapter 11 bankruptcy. Most of Benedek's stations, including WILX, were sold to Gray Communications Systems—today's Gray Media—of Albany, Georgia.

Just before Benedek's bankruptcy, WILX surpassed WLNS for first in local news in the February 2002 Nielsen ratings, which were affected by NBC's coverage of the 2002 Winter Olympics. Three months later, the station followed that up with a solid performance even without the Olympics: the station won in the morning newscast as well as at 6 and 11 p.m. After Gray, the news department expanded by taking over news production duties for Fox affiliate WSYM-TV, which disbanded its own independent newsroom in 2004. The relationship with WSYM-TV lasted more than 16 years until new owner The E. W. Scripps Company opted to reestablish its own news operation for the station in 2021.

Under Gray ownership, WILX has added several newscasts and other local programs. A midday lifestyle show, Studio 10, debuted in 2020; it went on hiatus in 2022 before returning the next year. A 4 p.m. news hour also returned in 2023.

In 2020, Gray acquired WLNM-LD (channel 27), a low-power TV station in Lansing, from Tri-State Christian Television for $175,000; the deal included a five-year free lease for the Christian broadcaster to continue programming one of its subchannels. The low-power station serves mainly to improve WILX's reception in the few areas of the market without cable or satellite that lost access to the main WILX signal after the digital transition. In June 2024, WLNM moved to a new tower facility to improve reception.

In a deal announced in 2025 and completed the next year, Gray acquired WSYM-TV from Scripps as part of a multi-market station trade between the companies. The two stations came back under common control on May 15, 2026, at which time Gray announced that WILX-TV's general manager would run the duopoly and it would break ground on an expansion to the American Road studio.

== Notable former on-air staff ==
- Jim Brandstatter – sportscaster, 1975–1977
- Ahmed Fareed – sports anchor, 2004–2005
- Chris Hansen – reporter, 1981–1982
- Matt Morrison – sports anchor, 1990–1994
- Dan Ponce – anchor/reporter, until 2006

== Technical information ==
=== Subchannels ===
WILX-TV's transmitter is located in Onondaga. The station's signal is multiplexed:

Subchannels of WILX-TV
Subchannel	Res.	Short name	Programming
10.1	1080i	WILX-DT	NBC
10.2	480i	MeTV	MeTV
10.3	480i	H & I	Heroes & Icons
10.4	480i	ION	Ion
10.5	480i	The365	365BLK
10.6	480i	CRIME	True Crime Network
10.7	480i	Outlaw	Outlaw

=== Analog-to-digital conversion ===
WILX-TV shut down its analog signal, over VHF channel 10, on February 17, 2009, the original target date on which full-power television stations in the United States were to transition from analog to digital broadcasts under federal mandate (which was later pushed back to June 12, 2009). The station's digital signal relocated from its pre-transition UHF channel 57, which was among the high-band UHF channels (52-69) that were removed from broadcasting use as a result of the transition, to its analog-era VHF channel 10.
