= WLNS-TV =

Television station in Lansing, Michigan

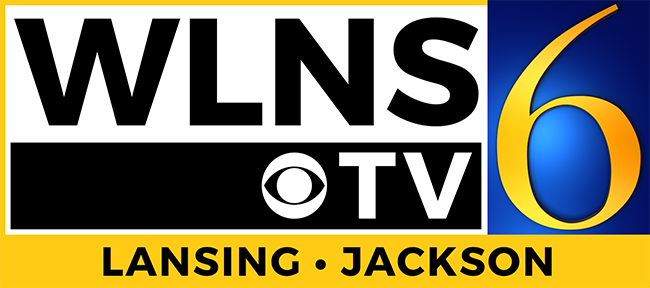
- Lansing–Jackson, Michigan; United States
- City: Lansing, Michigan
- Channels: Digital: 14 (UHF), shared with WLAJ; Virtual: 6
- Branding: WLNS 6; 6 News

Programming
- Affiliations: 6.1: CBS

Ownership
- Owner: Nexstar Media Group; (Nexstar Media Inc.)
- Sister stations: WLAJ

History
- First air date: May 1, 1950
- Former call signs: WJIM-TV (1950-1984)
- Former channel numbers: Analog: 6 (VHF, 1950–2009); Digital: 59 (UHF, 2001–2009), 36 (UHF, 2009–2018), 25 (UHF, 2018–2020)
- Former affiliations: All secondary: DuMont (1950–1955); ABC (1950–1958); NBC (1950–1959); United (secondary, 1967)
- Call sign meaning: Lansing

Technical information
- Licensing authority: FCC
- Facility ID: 74420
- ERP: 950 kW
- HAAT: 289.8 m (951 ft)
- Transmitter coordinates: 42°41′19″N 84°22′35″W

Links
- Public license information: Public file; LMS
- Website: www.wlns.com

WLNS-TV (channel 6) is a television station in Lansing, Michigan, United States, affiliated with CBS. It is owned by Nexstar Media Group and co-managed with ABC/CW+ affiliate WLAJ (channel 53). The two stations share studios on East Saginaw Street on Lansing's Eastside and transmit using WLAJ's spectrum from a tower on Van Atta Road in Okemos, Michigan.

== History ==
=== WJIM-TV ===
The station began test broadcasts on March 1950, and made its official broadcast on May 1 of the same year, as WJIM-TV and was owned by Harold F. Gross along with WJIM radio (1240 AM), through WJIM, Inc. It is Michigan's second-oldest television station outside Detroit (behind WOOD-TV in Grand Rapids). Gross had started WJIM, the oldest continuously operated commercial radio station in Lansing, in 1934; both stations were named after his son Jim. According to local legend, Gross won the original radio license in a card game.

WJIM-TV originally carried programming from all four networks of the day: ABC, DuMont, NBC, and CBS. However, it was, and always has been, a primary CBS affiliate. ABC disappeared from the schedule in 1958 when WJRT-TV signed on from Flint. DuMont programming disappeared when the network ceased operations in 1956. NBC disappeared from the schedule in 1959 when WILX-TV signed on. Thus, at the start of the fall 1959 television season, WJIM-TV was broadcasting only CBS.

On September 2, 1973, the Sunday Detroit Free Press published the first piece of an investigation by David Cay Johnston into news blackouts and manipulations ordered by Gross with follow-up reports continuing for three years. Two years later, The New York Times examined the case.

The local chapter of the American Civil Liberties Union (ACLU) challenged the station's license in 1973 alleging that Gross, whose company was by then renamed Gross Telecasting, Inc., prevented a number of prominent political figures from appearing on WJIM-TV. A Federal Communications Commission (FCC) judge ordered the license revoked in 1981. WJIM kept its license when the initial revocation was reversed by the FCC in 1982. The ACLU would eventually agree to a cash settlement in 1984.

=== WLNS ===
The stress of the decade-long licensing dispute led Gross to end his half-century in the broadcasting business. He sold WJIM-TV to Backe Communications in July 13, 1984. The station, per FCC rules at the time (which prohibited TV and radio stations in the same market, but with different ownership, from sharing the same call letters) adopted its current call letters, WLNS-TV, on July 16, 1984. WJIM-AM-FM was sold to Liggett Broadcasting in 1993, netting Gross a handsome return on his original investment. Backe's ownership of the station was short-lived; in March 1986, WLNS was sold to Young Broadcasting for $72 million.

In May 1994, Detroit CBS affiliate WJBK announced that it would switch its affiliation to Fox as part of a deal between the network and New World Communications. CBS heavily pursued WXYZ-TV as a replacement affiliate, but the E. W. Scripps Company renewed the station's affiliation with ABC one month later in exchange for switching the affiliations of three of its sister stations—KNXV-TV in Phoenix, WFTS-TV in Tampa and WMAR-TV in Baltimore—to the network. WDIV was not an option as that station was still in a long-term contract with NBC at the time, while WKBD-TV (which was about to lose Fox), WADL, and WXON were not interested in affiliating with CBS. With just weeks to go before WJBK was due to join Fox, CBS still had yet to find a new affiliate in Detroit. Facing the prospect of having to pipe in WLNS-TV, Flint affiliate WNEM-TV, and Toledo affiliate WTOL for cable subscribers, CBS agreed to purchase independent station WGPR-TV (now WWJ-TV), which became an affiliate of the network on December 11, 1994. WLNS-TV served as the default CBS affiliate for the western portion of the Detroit market until WWJ-TV built a new transmitter in 1999.

WLNS-TV shut down its analog signal, over VHF channel 6, on June 12, 2009, the official date on which full-power television stations in the United States transitioned from analog to digital broadcasts under federal mandate. The station digital signal relocated from its pre-transition UHF channel 59 to UHF channel 36, using virtual channel 6.

Young filed for Chapter 11 bankruptcy protection in early 2009. The company was subsequently taken over by its secured lenders and outsourced most of its operations to Gray Television. WLNS-TV was not part of the management agreement because Gray already owned WILX. Young merged with Media General in November 2013.

Following the other Young stations that launched The Country Network in late November 2010, WLNS-TV added that network to its .2 subchannel in the first quarter of 2011. On January 30, 2012, WLNS-TV changed its 6.2 affiliation to the Live Well Network along with 7 other Young stations.

Media General added GetTV to 20 of its stations' subchannels, including WLNS-TV, in a roll out that started on February 1, 2016. Media General merged with Nexstar in January 2017.

=== Spectrum transition ===
In the 2016 FCC spectrum reallocation auction, Media General sold the over-the-air spectrum of WLNS-TV for $13.6 million, while expecting to negotiate a channel sharing arrangement with another station. GetTV on .2 was dropped by March 6, 2018, to prepare for the channel share; this would end up being SSA partner WLAJ. On June 11, 2018, WLNS-TV discontinued broadcasting from its transmitter in Okemos and began broadcasting from WLAJ's transmitter on channel 25; it continues to appear as virtual channel 6. This created a situation where the senior partner in an operating agreement transmits on the spectrum of its junior partner.

As a consequence because of the channel share and the need to transmit three television signals in high definition (1080i for WLNS, and 720p for WLAJ's two ABC and CW channels), the 6.3 Ion Television subchannel was discontinued. In 2020, WLNS/WLAJ moved its digital channel to channel 14 and resumed transmitting from the Okemos transmitter location.

== News operation ==
As of 2021, WLNS-TV presently broadcasts 29 hours of locally produced newscasts each week (with five hours each weekday, and two hours each on Saturdays and Sundays).

Traditionally, WLNS-TV had been the most watched television station in Central Michigan regularly beating rival WILX in Nielsen ratings. Sometime in the early 2000s, however, WILX overtook WLNS-TV for the first time.

In July 2011, WLNS-TV began airing all of its news programming from a temporary set in the station's breakroom while a new one was constructed in preparation for its own launch of HD news programming. The brand new set debuted on August 26, 2011, during the 5 p.m. newscast while HD newscasts debuted during the 5 p.m. show on October 26, 2011.

On September 12, 2011, 6 News This Morning expanded to 2 1/2 hours and now begins at 4:30 a.m. As a result, the CBS Morning News now airs at 4 a.m. locally. On April 1, 2013, WLNS-TV began simulcasting its weeknight 6 and 11 p.m. newscasts on WLAJ. WLNS-TV's morning newscast started simulcasting (from 5 to 7 a.m.) on WLAJ on April 15 and includes separate, pre-recorded cut-ins during ABC's Good Morning America. In addition to its main studios, WLNS-TV operates a bureau within the Jackson Citizen Patriot newsroom on South Jackson Street in downtown Jackson.

== Technical information ==
WLAJ and WLNS-TV broadcast from a tower on Van Atta Road in Okemos.

Subchannels of WLAJ and WLNS-TV
| License | Subchannel | Res. | Short name | Programming |
|---|---|---|---|---|
| WLAJ | 53.1 | 720p | WLAJ-DT | ABC |
| WLAJ | 53.2 | 720p | WLAJ-DT | The CW Plus |
| WLNS-TV | 6.1 | 1080i | WLNS-TV | CBS |

=== Former repeater ===
Starting in 1982, WLNS-TV's programming was seen on a low-power analog repeater, W67AJ (channel 67) in Ann Arbor (which is also part of the Detroit market). This translator broadcast from a transmitter atop the Harlan Hatcher Graduate Library on the campus of the University of Michigan, but was owned by Eastern Michigan University in Ypsilanti. W67AJ went silent in January 2006, and its license was canceled a year later by the FCC.
