= WGVU-TV =

Television station in Grand Rapids, Michigan

WGVU-TV and WGVK

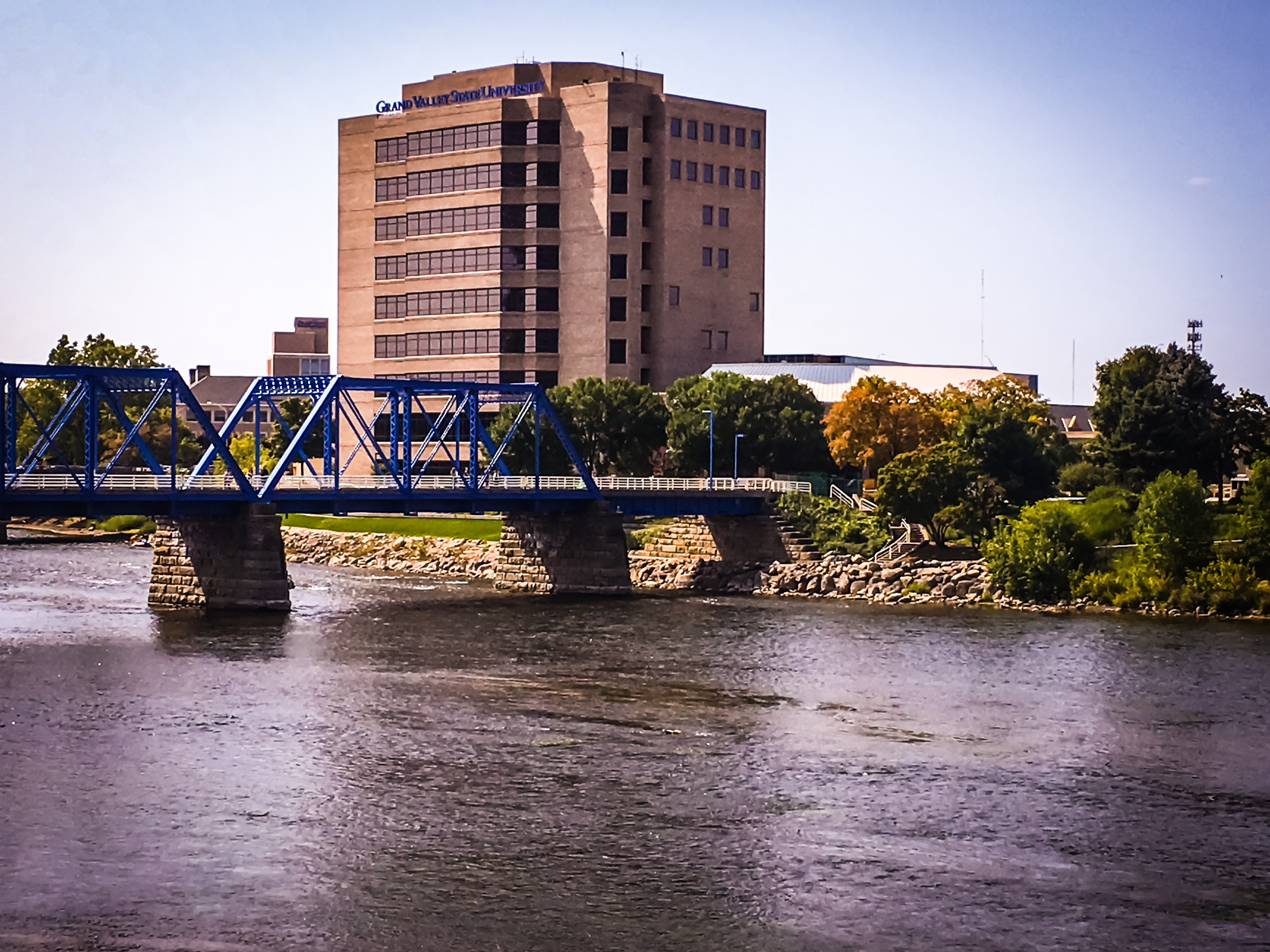
- The Meijer Public Broadcast Center is part of the Robert C. Pew Grand Rapids campus and was completed in 1988

WGVU-TV: Grand Rapids, Michigan; WGVK: Kalamazoo, Michigan; United States
- Channels for WGVU-TV: Digital: 11 (VHF); Virtual: 35
- Channels for WGVK: Digital: 5 (VHF); Virtual: 52
- Branding: PBS WGVU Public Media

Programming
- Affiliations: 35.1 and 52.1: PBS; for others, see § Subchannels

Ownership
- Owner: Grand Valley State University
- Sister stations: WGVU-FM, WGVS-FM

History
- First air date: WGVU-TV: December 17, 1972; WGVK: October 1, 1984
- Former call signs: WGVU-TV: WGVC (1972–1987)
- Former channel number: WGVU-TV: Analog: 35 (UHF, 1972–2009); WGVK: Analog: 52 (UHF, 1984–2009)
- Call sign meaning: WGVU-TV: Grand Valley State University; WGVK: "WGVU Kalamazoo"

Technical information
- Licensing authority: FCC
- Facility ID: WGVU-TV: 24784; WGVK: 24783
- ERP: WGVU-TV: 41.5 kW; WGVK: 10 kW
- HAAT: WGVU-TV: 259.9 m (853 ft); WGVK: 169 m (554 ft)
- Transmitter coordinates: WGVU-TV: 42°57′34.7″N 85°53′44.9″W; WGVK: 42°18′23.1″N 85°39′25″W

Links
- Public license information: WGVU-TV: Public file; LMS; WGVK: Public file; LMS
- Website: www.wgvu.org/television/

WGVU-TV (channel 35) in Grand Rapids, Michigan, and WGVK (channel 52) in Kalamazoo, Michigan, are PBS member television stations serving West Michigan. The stations are owned by Grand Valley State University and maintain studios in the Meijer Public Broadcast Center, located in the Eberhard Center on the Robert C. Pew Campus of GVSU on Fulton Street West in downtown Grand Rapids. WGVU's transmitter is located near the GVSU main campus near the intersection of Pierce Road and 48th Street in Allendale, while WGVK's transmitter is in Kalamazoo's Westwood neighborhood.

Channel 35 was the first to begin broadcasting as WGVC-TV on December 17, 1972. Owned by what was then Grand Valley State College, it represented a partnership between the educational institution and a community group that had been seeking to establish a public TV station for the area for five years. Kalamazoo was on the periphery of the WGVC-TV service area, and over-the-air reception in the southern half of the market was still marginal even after a substantial power increase in 1974. With this in mind, WGVK was established in 1984 to provide a higher-quality signal to the southern half of the market.

The Grand Rapids station changed call signs in 1987 when Grand Valley State attained university status, and the studios moved from the GVSU campus in Allendale to downtown Grand Rapids in 1988. In the 1990s, WGVU–WGVK navigated cuts in state and federal support for public broadcasting but increased its profile in program distribution. In the 2000s and 2010s, it produced several award-winning documentaries and converted to digital broadcasting.

WGVU-TV and WGVK are funded by local viewers as well as by appropriations from Grand Valley State University and previously by grants from the Corporation for Public Broadcasting. In addition to PBS programming, the station produces a range of arts and cultural programming focusing on West Michigan.

== History ==
=== Early years ===
Interest in establishing an educational television station in Grand Rapids manifested as early as 1953, with the formation of a local group. With no local station, schools made limited use of educational programming. The Midwest Program on Airborne Television Instruction (MPATI) service of Purdue University, beamed from aircraft flying above northern Indiana, began in 1961 and was received in some of the region. Other schools used the Classroom 10 programs broadcast from WMSB (channel 10), a service of Michigan State University primarily serving areas east of Grand Rapids. By 1967, WMSB was one of just four educational TV stations on the air in Michigan. On August 5, 1968, the Wolverine Educational Television Corporation began a campaign for donations to fund the construction of a community-operated educational TV station serving Grand Rapids and seven surrounding counties, which it proposed to call WETC and have on the air by 1970. In September 1970, the director of WUCM-TV at Delta College agreed to take a leave of absence from that station to help start Wolverine's channel 35.

Wolverine announced on December 2, 1970, that it had agreed to partner with Grand Valley State College in Allendale, near Grand Rapids, to bring channel 35 online. The college was to own and operate the station, with Wolverine continuing in an advisory capacity. According to Wolverine president Frederick Herbst, the station would have a potential audience of a million people. MPATI had shuttered some time earlier, leaving a gap in instructional television programming available to West Michigan schools. The new effort received offers of transmitter facility space and other support from the two commercial TV stations in Grand Rapids, WOOD-TV and WZZM. Though the station was initially approved to use space on WZZM's tower in Grant, it was moved before launch to a site on Grand Valley's campus, where studios were built inside Manitou Hall.

WGVC-TV began broadcasting on December 17, 1972. The inaugural program, an interview with Grand Valley State College president Arend Lubbers, was filmed at WZZM because channel 35 did not yet have its own camera. In addition to evening PBS programs, it supplied seven hours each weekday of instructional programs to schools and aired Sesame Street and The Electric Company, both previously seen on WZZM in the absence of a local public TV station. Initially, the station was unable to carry live PBS programming; it was one of 16 non-interconnected stations among PBS's roster of 245 members. While some shows aired on a one-month delay, more timely programs, such as Wall Street Week and Washington Week in Review, either went unaired or were out of date: general manager Gordon Lawrence noted, "It was sort of embarrassing. We had a program speculating on Richard Nixon's resignation two days after he resigned." After almost three years of requests, WGVC-TV received funding from the Corporation for Public Broadcasting for a microwave link to the PBS network in 1974.

Channel 35 originally operated at 562,000 watts, producing reception that was spotty at best; pictures were snowy even in some areas close to Grand Rapids. In 1974, the station doubled its effective radiated power to 1 million watts, improving reception and enabling the station to be added to the cable system serving Battle Creek alongside Michigan State's WKAR-TV (successor to WMSB) and Detroit's WTVS. The station aired a number of local programs in the mid-1970s, including a community affairs show, a weekly arts program, replays of Grand Valley State College football games, and Thinking of Holland, presenting Dutch culture and media. It acquired a mobile unit and a color video tape machine in 1976 using federal grants, though the mobile unit was expensive and required half the station's staff to run, limiting its use. A high school quiz show debuted in January 1978.

Initial station manager Gordon Lawrence departed in 1979 to set up WFUM-TV in Flint. By this time, increased production costs and staff issues had led the station to reduce its local programming output by one-fourth compared to 1976.

=== Expansion to Kalamazoo and new studios in Grand Rapids ===
From before channel 35 signed on, there were questions its footprint would penetrate far enough to adequately serve Kalamazoo, the second-largest city in the vast West Michigan market. Pre-launch coverage maps showed the station's secondary signal contour bisecting the city, though station officials suggested it would reach further south. Previously, Kalamazoo had received educational and PBS programming over the air from Michigan State's WMSB, while Detroit's WTVS and Chicago's WTTW were available on cable. However, in 1972, two months before the launch of WGVC-TV, Michigan State ended the 14-year share-time arrangement between WMSB and Lansing NBC affiliate WILX-TV on channel 10. WMSB's replacement, WKAR-TV, moved to UHF channel 23 from a transmitter located too far east to cover Kalamazoo. Even though the 1974 power increase added all of Kalamazoo to WGVC-TV's footprint, the channel 35 signal became increasingly marginal south of Plainwell, 10 mi (16 km) north of Kalamazoo.

In 1981, several groups applied to operate channel 52 in Kalamazoo as a low-power TV station; among them was the Fetzer Broadcasting Company, owner of WKZO radio and television, which proposed to offer it to Western Michigan University. Grand Valley State College also proposed a low-power repeater of WGVC-TV. As early as 1976, Kalamazoo residents had approached Friends of Channel 35, WGVC-TV's support organization, with a request to extend the channel 35 signal. In February 1983, Grand Valley State College applied instead for a full-power satellite of WGVC-TV on channel 52. WGVK began broadcasting October 1, 1984, adding 50,000 viewers to WGVC-TV's footprint who had previously needed cable to watch PBS programming. Grand Valley would have brought channel 52 online sooner, but station officials were reluctant to do so in the middle of channel 35's pledge drive. Station manager George Lott told The Kalamazoo Gazette that it would have been "too crass to turn the switch on and then ask for money".

Grand Valley State began a campaign in 1985 to build a nine-story campus in downtown Grand Rapids, which included studios for WGVC-TV. Gerald Elliott, a former program host at channel 35, had noted as early as 1977 that the Manitou Hall facility was inadequate and of lesser quality than the television production studios at Western Michigan University, which did not have a station at all. Grand Valley State College and three other Michigan state colleges were upgraded to university status in November 1987, and WGVC-TV became WGVU-TV beginning December 14, 1987. The Meijer Public Broadcast Center opened in April 1988, offering 50% more studio space and two full editing studios; WGVC-TV began broadcasting in stereo, including local stereo origination capability, though the Kalamazoo transmitter was not equipped for stereo until 1994. The new facility was named for Frederik Meijer, whose family donated the largest portion of the first $2 million raised.

For its first fifteen years of existence, WGVU-TV was among the best-supported PBS stations in the nation by its viewers, whose contributions represented 70% of the station's budget. Community support increased by 10 percent or more in every year between 1980 and 1987, and in December 1985, the station had the highest average donation of any public TV station. However, after the capital campaign to move to downtown Grand Rapids, support cooled off, more in line with other stations across the country. Its local programming output trailed PBS stations in comparably sized markets; under Lott, who ran the station from 1979 to 1987, it largely ignored local production in favor of higher-budget national offerings from PBS and other public TV stations. In 1988, WGVU-TV had a budget of $3.7 million and a staff of 35, producing 63 hours a year of local programming. With a smaller budget and staff, WKPC-TV in Louisville, Kentucky, produced 144 hours. Lott's successor, Michael T. Walenta, was more aggressive in introducing local programming, organizing a weeknight 7:30 p.m. time slot in which five different local programs appeared on a weekly basis. The strip concept had disappeared by 1992, when the only regular local show on the station's air was the weekly public affairs program West Michigan Week.

In 1992, Michigan's Department of Commerce ceased public funding for all public broadcasting stations in the state. Continued threats of cuts to federal appropriations as well as the end of direct state support led station management to prioritize diversifying funding sources. In the decade, WGVU produced the hunting series Spirit of the Wild, hosted by Ted Nugent, and distributed it to 38 PBS stations in ten states; in addition to other syndication prospects, it distributed coverage of Grand Rapids's annual 4th of July Gala internationally.

=== Digitalization and 21st century ===
WGVU and WGVK were later than West Michigan's commercial TV stations to begin digital broadcasting as Grand Valley State University worked to find funds for conversion of the Grand Rapids and Kalamazoo transmitters. By 2004, the digital transmitters were in service, kickstarting a conversion that WGVU estimated would add 1.2 million people to its coverage area and required new transmitters at both sites, as well as a rebuild of its master control facility. On June 12, 2009, WGVU-TV and WGVK simultaneously ceased analog broadcasts; Frederik Meijer ceremonially turned off the Kalamazoo transmitter as Lubbens did the same in Grand Rapids. The stations continued their broadcasts in digital on their pre-transition VHF digital channels of 11 and 5. After the conversions, WGVU launched two subchannels, with Create offered during the day and themed and repeat programming at night on 35/52.2 as well as MHz Worldview on 35/52.3.

In the 2000s, WGVU produced several documentaries of note. The 2005 documentary Surviving Auschwitz: Children of the Shoah, based on work by Milton J. Nieuwsma, won a Michigan Emmy and was selected by the Museum of Broadcast Communications for archival. In 2008, WGVU aired a 10-part series on the crew of the USS Nimitz. Two years later, it debuted LZ Michigan, a program profiling military veterans; its success led to the station's inclusion in PBS's national Stories for Service initiative.

After more than 30 years as general manager, Michael Walenta retired from the WGVU stations in 2018. Walenta's acting successor, Jay Lowe, died of cancer within a year of assuming the post. He was replaced by former WCMU general manager Ken Kolbe, who retired in 2021 and was replaced at WGVU by his WCMU successor, Jim Rademaker.

== Funding ==
In fiscal year 2023, WGVU-TV recorded total revenue of $5,490,471. The Corporation for Public Broadcasting provided a $976,334 Community Service Grant and $78,763 in other funds. Appropriations from Grand Valley State University totaled $373,160. The station had 19,793 members, who donated $2,325,281, and 60 major individual donors, who contributed $342,020.

== Local programming ==
WGVU-TV produces local culture, arts, and lifestyle programming for West Michigan. Programs it produced and aired in 2024 include Living West Michigan, a lifestyle magazine; Kalamazoo Lively Arts, focused specifically on the arts scene in Kalamazoo; Mutually Inclusive; the art instruction program Pocket Sketching; and Color Out Here, a travel and outdoors program highlighting minority experiences.

== Subchannels ==
WGVU-TV's transmitter is located near the GVSU main campus in Allendale, while WGVK's transmitter is in Kalamazoo's Westwood neighborhood. The stations' signals are multiplexed:

Subchannels of WGVU-TV and WGVK
Subchannel		Res.	Short name		Programming
WGVU-TV	WGVK	Res.	WGVU-TV	WGVK	Programming
35.1	52.1	1080i	WGVUPBS	WGVKPBS	PBS
35.2	52.2	480i	PBSKIDS		PBS Kids
35.3	52.3	720p	CREATE		Create
35.4	52.4	480i	WORLD		World
35.5	52.5	480i	WGVUMLC	WGVKMLC	Michigan Learning Channel
35.6	52.6	480i	GUIDE		Schedule scroll
