= WKAR =

In broadcasting, WKAR refers to three stations based in East Lansing, Michigan:

- WKAR (AM), a radio station (870 AM), airing a news/talk format
- WKAR-FM, a radio station (90.5 FM), airing news/talk and classical music
- WKAR-TV, a PBS member television station (channel 33, virtual 23)
