= WDBM =

Student radio station at Michigan State University

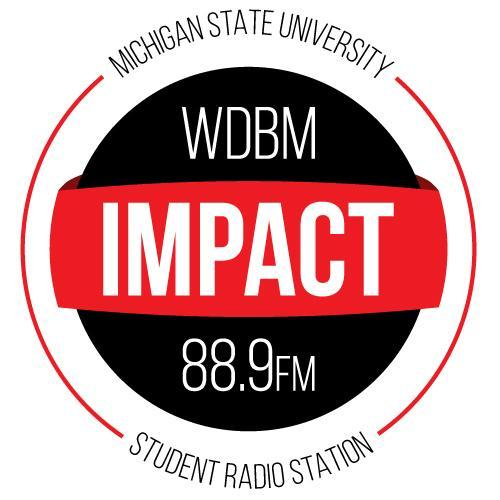
- East Lansing, Michigan; United States
- Broadcast area: East Lansing, Michigan
- Frequency: 88.9 MHz (HD Radio)
- Branding: Impact 89FM

Programming
- Format: College radio; Variety

Ownership
- Owner: Michigan State University

History
- First air date: February 24, 1989
- Former call signs: WBDM (11/10/87-2/7/89)
- Call sign meaning: We Do Better Music

Technical information
- Facility ID: 4241
- Class: A
- Power: 2,000 watts
- HAAT: 85 meters
- Transmitter coordinates: 42°42′20″N 84°28′30″W

Links
- Webcast: Listen live
- Website: impact89fm.org

WDBM (88.9 FM), East Lansing, Michigan, United States, branded Impact 89FM, is a 2,000 watt, Class A, student-run college radio station at Michigan State University that broadcasts to listeners in the Lansing metropolitan area. The signal can be heard as far south as Jackson, Michigan, southeast almost to Brighton, and north to Alma (due 34 miles southwest of Midland), far beyond its 60 dBu service contour which represents its clearest signal. The station is the successor to the Michigan State Network, which in the 1970s was the nation's largest college carrier current radio network, and had studios in several MSU dormitories. The network was eventually consolidated to one carrier current station, WLFT ("Tune to the Left"), which broadcast from the former WKAR studios on the third floor of the MSU Auditorium Building. This was also the first home of WDBM-FM.

WDBM began broadcasting in 1989 with the moniker Impact 89FM, a name it still uses today. WDBM was originally licensed by the FCC with call letters WBDM on November 10, 1987. As told by the founding general manager, Gary Reid, someone wrote the call letters down as "WDBM". Marketing and promotional items were all created with these incorrect call letters. After the mistake was discovered, the station quickly found that the WDBM calls were available, applied to the FCC to make the change, and the new calls were granted on February 7, 1989.

WDBM is one of the few student-run college radio stations to broadcast 24 hours a day, 365 days a year. In 2004, it was the nation's first college station to broadcast in HD Radio, and streams its programming on its website.

The station's current general manager is Jeremy Whiting, who is only the third general manager in the station's history, following Gary Reid and Ed Glazer.

The station's staff began recording and podcasting Michigan governor Jennifer Granholm's weekly radio address in 2005.

The station is licensed to the MSU Board of Trustees, is financed by a student fee, and operates separately from the university's other media outlets, which include WKAR, WKAR-FM, WKAR-TV, and the State News. Impact 89FM broadcasts from the basement of the Holden Hall dormitory on south campus.

In February 1994, Impact 89FM hosted its fifth birthday party in the MSU Union. Bands performing that evening included Wally Pleasant and The Verve Pipe (a year before they were signed to RCA).

On Tuesday, February 24, 2009, the Impact turned 20 and celebrated 20 years of broadcasting by holding a birthday bash at the local East Lansing Buffalo Wild Wings, where alumni came back to do a special hour of on-air programming.

In January 2015, Impact 89FM was named "College Radio Station of the Year" by the Michigan Association of Broadcasters, receiving the award for the first time since 2011. WDBM has been honored with this award more than any other college radio station in the state of Michigan.

== Programming ==
On weekdays, WDBM broadcasts mainly alternative music, and features live DJs during almost every hour. At night, block programming features specialty shows such as alternative country, metal, indie, local music, and hip hop.

The Lansing City Pulse credited WDBM's Progressive Torch and Twang program for igniting and sustaining the alternative country scene in mid-Michigan. The program was also cited in the seminal book Modern Twang.

Talk shows air on Sunday mornings, covering current events, student profiles and sports.

== See also ==
- Campus radio
- List of college radio stations in the United States

== Sources ==
- Michiguide.com - WDBM history
