= WCMU =

WCMU is the callsign of two public broadcasting stations in Mount Pleasant, Michigan, owned by Central Michigan University:

- WCMU-FM, a NPR member radio station at 89.5 FM
- WCMU-TV, a PBS member television station at channel 14

Both stations also have rebroadcast transmitters throughout northern Michigan.
