= WCMW =

WCMW may refer to:

- WCMW (TV), a television station (channel 20, virtual 21) licensed to serve Manistee, Michigan, United States
- WCMW-FM, a radio station (103.9 FM) licensed to serve Harbor Springs, Michigan
