= WCMZ =

WCMZ may refer to:

- WCMZ-FM, a radio station (98.3 FM) licensed to serve Sault Ste. Marie, Michigan, United States
- WCMZ-TV, a defunct television station (channel 28) formerly licensed to serve Flint, Michigan
