= Dick Estell =

American broadcaster

Dick Estell in the WKAR-FM radio station, circa 1964

Dick Estell (April 11, 1926 – May 6, 2016) was an American radio personality. He was the host and producer of The Radio Reader, a serial public radio program in which the host reads aloud from contemporary novels. The program was carried on public broadcasting stations in the United States.

== Background ==
Born and raised in Hillsdale, Michigan, Estell enrolled at the University of Detroit following high school. However, he left after a year to join the United States Air Force. He trained as a ball turret gunner/radio operator, but World War II ended before he saw active duty. After military service, he attended a radio/TV broadcasting school in Los Angeles. Upon graduating, he accepted a position as radio announcer/engineer at a commercial radio station in Michigan.

== Radio career ==
After five years, Estell decided to finish his college studies and entered the radio/TV program at Michigan State University. In 1964, he took over The Radio Reader from his predecessor at MSU's radio stations, WKAR (AM) and WKAR-FM, where he served as general manager until his retirement in 1986. He taped the program from a home studio in Haslett, Michigan. He served as chairman of the board for National Public Radio from 1972 to 1974.

He was also the narrator of several commercially available audio books, including Kenneth C. Davis' popular Don't Know Much About History and Don't Know Much about the Civil War.

After more than fifty years, health issues compelled Estell to discontinue his broadcasts. The concluding episodes of John Grisham's Rogue Lawyer were read by Estell's good friend, Bob Page, former manager of WKAR-TV at Michigan State University. The final episode of The Radio Reader aired March 10, 2016.

== Personal life ==
Estell married his wife Sheryl in 2001. He died on May 6, 2016, from a lengthy, undisclosed illness. He was 90.
