= Rogue Lawyer =

2015 novel by John Grisham

- First edition (US)
- Author: John Grisham
- Language: English
- Genre: Legal thriller
- Publisher: Doubleday (US); Hodder & Stoughton (UK)
- Publication date: October 20, 2015
- Publication place: United States
- Pages: 352 pp (hardcover 1st edition)
- ISBN: 978-0-385-53943-2

Rogue Lawyer is a novel by John Grisham. It was released in hardcover, large print paperback, e-book, compact disc audiobook and downloadable audiobook on October 20, 2015. It is a legal thriller about unconventional street lawyer Sebastian Rudd. In November 2015, the novel was at the top of the New York Times Fiction Best Seller for two weeks. The name "Max Mancini", Rudd's City Attorney adversary in the story, was chosen as a result of a fund-raising auction for the charity Reprieve.

The February 4, 2016 reading of the book was the final book read on The Radio Reader before the May 5 death of host Dick Estell.

== Plot ==
Sebastian Rudd is a street lawyer, but not your typical street lawyer. His office is a black customized bulletproof van, complete with Wi-Fi, a bar, a small fridge, and fine leather chairs. He has no firm, no partners, and only one employee: his heavily armed driver, who used to be his client, and who also happens to be his bodyguard, law clerk, confidant, golf caddie, and his only friend. Sebastian drinks small-batch bourbon and carries a gun. His beautiful ex-wife is a lawyer too, and she left him for another woman while still they were married. He only gets to see his son for 36 hours per month and his ex-wife wants to stop all visits. He defends people other lawyers won't go near: a drug-addled, tattooed kid rumored to be in a satanic cult who is (falsely) accused of murdering two girls; a vicious crime lord on death row who ends up escaping before Rudd's eyes; a homeowner arrested for shooting at a SWAT team that mistakenly invaded his house, and killed his wife and dogs; a Mixed martial arts fighter previously financed by Rudd who killed a referee after losing a fight. In between these adventures, he's contacted by a serial kidnapper and killer who's involved in human trafficking, and knows the whereabouts of the assistant chief of police's missing daughter.

== In other media ==
In 2018, it was reported that Michael Seitzman and Jason Richman were developing a television adaptation of Rogue Lawyer with ABC Studios for Hulu. The series was intended to be set in a shared universe based on Grisham's novels, and was to be developed and produced alongside an adaptation of The Rainmaker containing shared characters and intertwining plot elements. Neither series, or the shared universe concept, went forward with Hulu, and Seitzman later took The Rainmaker to Blumhouse Television and USA Network as a standalone project.
