= WCMZ-TV =

Television station in Flint, Michigan (1980–2018)

Defunct; formerly served as satellite of WCMU-TV, Mount Pleasant, Michigan

Flint, Michigan; United States
- Channels: Digital: 28 (UHF); Virtual: 28
- Branding: CMU Public Television

Programming
- Affiliations: PBS (1980–2018)

Ownership
- Owner: Central Michigan University

History
- First air date: August 23, 1980
- Last air date: April 23, 2018 (37 years, 243 days)
- Former call signs: WFUM (1980–2010)
- Former channel number(s): Analog: 28 (UHF, 1980–2008); Digital: 52 (UHF, 2004–2008)
- Call sign meaning: Central Michigan Z

Technical information
- Licensing authority: FCC
- Facility ID: 69273
- ERP: 500 kW
- HAAT: 258 m (846 ft)
- Transmitter coordinates: 42°53′56.1″N 83°27′40.8″W

Links
- Public license information: Public file; LMS

WCMZ-TV (channel 28) was a PBS member television station in Flint, Michigan, United States. It operated as a satellite station of Mount Pleasant–licensed WCMU-TV (channel 14) which is owned by Central Michigan University (CMU). WCMZ-TV's transmitter was located off Kipp Road near M-15 (South State Road), just south east of the village of Goodrich in southeastern Genesee County, which was then used and remains in use today by former sister radio station WFUM.

Channel 28 was built as WFUM by the University of Michigan–Flint in 1980 and filled a gap in public television coverage in the central part of the state. UM–Flint sold the station in 2010 to CMU, which converted it to repeat the programs of WCMU-TV in Mount Pleasant. Citing the availability of other stations on cable and over-the-air in its service area, WCMZ-TV was sold in the FCC spectrum auction in February 2017 and closed on April 23, 2018.

== History ==
=== WFUM ===
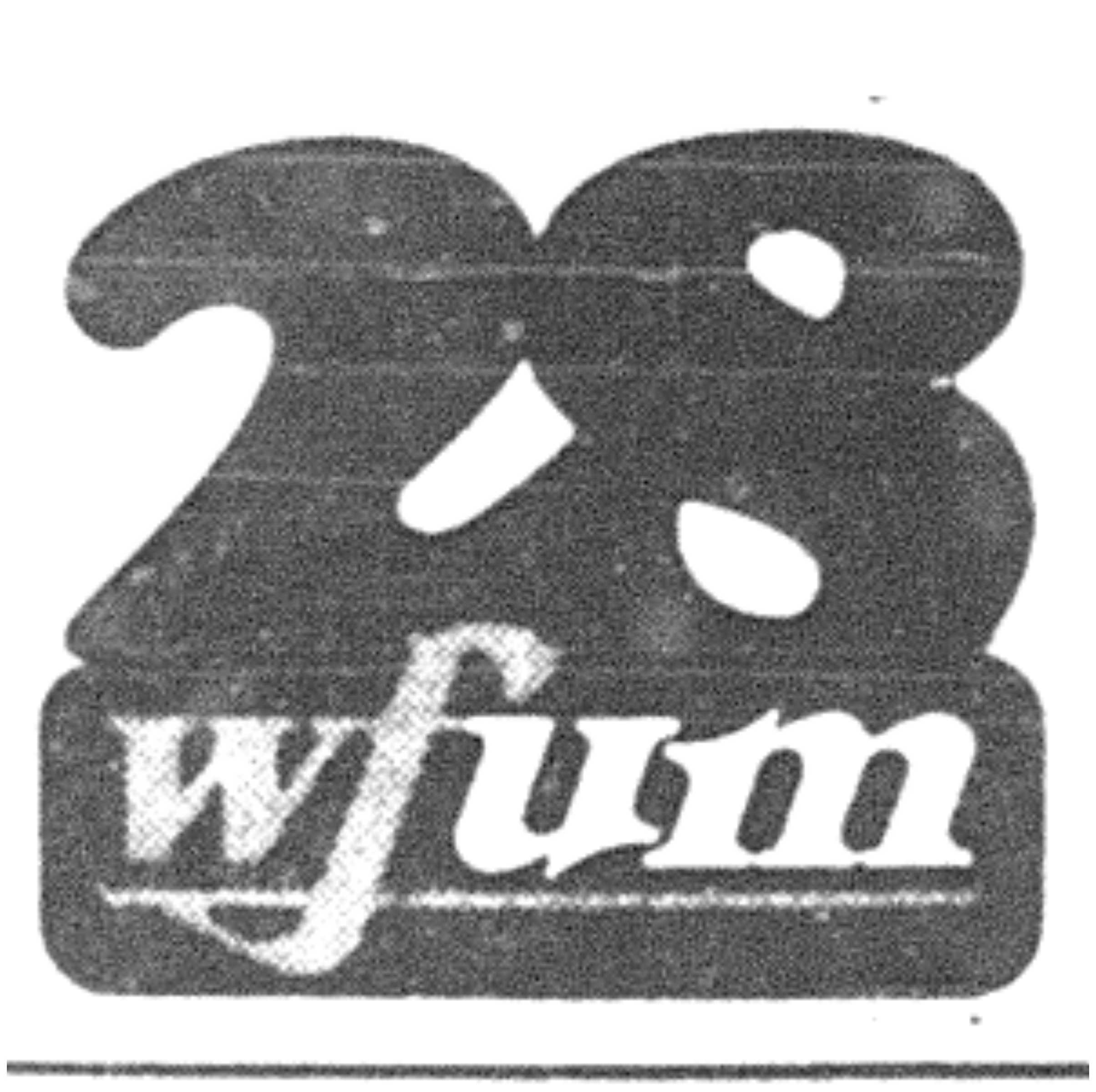
1980 WFUM logo

1993 WFUM logo.

Final WFUM logo.

The station first signed on the air on August 23, 1980, as WFUM under the ownership of the University of Michigan–Flint with coverage of the Crim race. Initially promoted using its WFUM call letters, the station eventually began to brand itself as "Michigan Television". Prior to WFUM's sign-on, Flint had been one of the few areas of Michigan that was not served by an over-the-air PBS station. Most cable providers in the area (then as now) piped in WCMU-TV, WDCQ-TV in Bay City, WTVS in Detroit, WKAR-TV in East Lansing or WGTE-TV in Toledo.

In 2002, the University of Michigan moved all media assets including WFUM into Michigan Public Media, which reported to the main UM Ann Arbor campus. In 2007, the station broadcast the Crim Festival of Races for the last time as its producer had retired the year before and costs were too high to produce.

WFUM was the first PBS member station in Michigan and the first television station in the Flint/Tri-Cities market to broadcast exclusively in digital. The station discontinued regular programming on its analog signal, over UHF channel 28, on November 19, 2008, and signed back on by November 24, 2008. The station's digital signal relocated from its pre-transition UHF channel 52, which was among the high band UHF channels (52-69) that were removed from broadcasting use as a result of the transition, to its analog-era UHF channel 28.

In 2008, the Michigan Chapter of the National Academy of Television Arts and Sciences awarded the station nine regional Emmy awards for several programs. The programs included Childhood Places, Secret Spaces in which children's author Christopher Paul Curtis returns to his native Flint and a documentary about a Howell World War II Army Air Corps photo officer.

=== Sale to CMU and call sign change to WCMZ-TV ===
On April 23, 2009, the University of Michigan announced plans to discontinue its operation of WFUM-TV. On October 27, 2009, the Board of Trustees of Central Michigan University approved a proposal for CMU to acquire WFUM, for a maximum purchase price of $1 million. While WFUM was transitioned into a satellite of WCMU-TV, CMU vowed to include Flint-area events and issues in its programming, as well as produce new programming that would originate from the region. On January 15, 2010, WFUM-TV began repeating the CMU Public Television signal.

The station received WCMU programming via a microwave relay connection between WCMU's studios in Mount Pleasant to WFUM's transmitter, through relay facilities set up at Mott Community College. CMU originally hinted that the takeover of WFUM would begin in late November, however, CMU took over operations of WFUM at 1:00 a.m. on January 15, 2010. The Federal Communications Commission approved the transfer of the station's license on March 16, 2010. CMU officially took over WFUM on May 18, 2010, and the call letters were changed to WCMZ-TV. The agreement gave CMU Public Television one of the largest footprints in the PBS system, with at least secondary coverage from Petoskey to northern Monroe County.

The station's former studios in the William L. White Building at the University of Michigan-Flint is now a newsroom and satellite studio for all-news NPR affiliate WFUM Radio.

=== FCC spectrum sale and closure ===
On February 8, 2017, Central Michigan University announced it would sell WCMZ-TV in the FCC spectrum auction for $14,163,505, citing the easy availability of surrounding PBS member stations over-the-air and on pay services, namely Delta College's WDCQ-TV and stations from Detroit (WTVS) and Lansing (WKAR). It was later announced that Spectrum, AT&T U-verse, DirecTV and Dish Network will continue to offer WCMU's programming in WCMZ's viewing area; Mount Pleasant is part of the Flint/Tri-Cities market. It is unknown to date if Comcast, which serves much of the Flint and Detroit metro areas, would follow suit. WCMZ-TV closed on April 23, 2018, and the license was canceled the next day.

== Programming ==
WFUM was the only television station owned by the university, but the University of Michigan–Flint was no stranger to the medium—it produced an educational series, University of Michigan Presents, which was syndicated to television stations nationwide from the 1960s into the early 1980s. Over the years, WFUM had introduced several of its own shows, including Passing Through (hosted by Karen Sherrin) and High School Challenge (hosted by Jim Gaver).

From 1980 at sign on until 2007, the station broadcast the running of the Crim races.
