= Michigan Public =

Public radio network of the University of Michigan

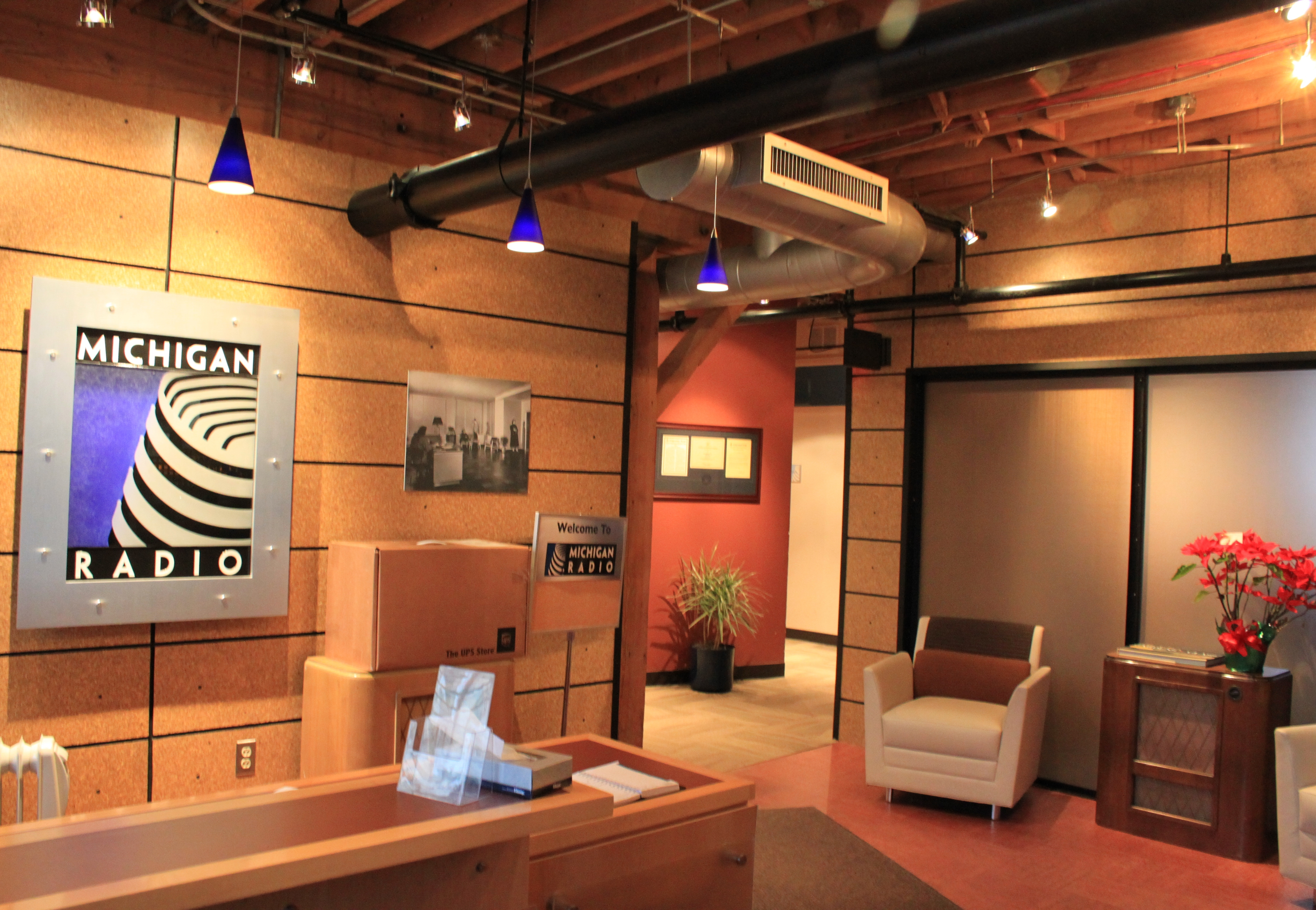
- Reception area for the Michigan Public studios in Ann Arbor
- Headquarters: Ann Arbor, Michigan
- Branding: Michigan Public

Programming
- Format: Public radio and talk
- Affiliations: NPR; PRX; APM; BBC World Service

Ownership
- Owner: University of Michigan

Links
- Website: michiganpublic.org

Michigan Public (known until 2024 as Michigan Radio) is a network of five FM public radio stations operated by the University of Michigan through its broadcasting arm, Michigan Public Media. The network is a founding member of National Public Radio and an affiliate of Public Radio International, American Public Media, and BBC World Service.

Michigan Public's main studio is located on West William Street in Ann Arbor, in the former Argus Camera factory. The network also operates satellite studios at the William S. White Building on the campus of the University of Michigan–Flint, and offices at the Meijer Public Broadcast Center on the Pew Campus of Grand Valley State University in Grand Rapids.

The network currently airs news and talk, which it has since July 1, 1996. The combined footprint of the five stations covers most of the southern Lower Peninsula of Michigan, from Muskegon to Detroit. All five stations broadcast in HD, albeit without any digital subchannels.

== Stations ==
The following stations make up Michigan Public:

Call sign	Frequency	City of license	FID	ERP (W)	HAAT	Class	Transmitter coordinates	FCC info
WUOM	91.7 FM	Ann Arbor, Michigan	66319	93000	237 m (778 ft)	B	42°24′27″N 83°54′50″W	LMS
WFUM	91.1 FM	Flint, Michigan	66306	17500	149 m (489 ft)	B	42°53′57″N 83°27′42″W	LMS
WVGR	104.1 FM	Grand Rapids, Michigan	66309	96000	221 m (725 ft)	B	42°39′18″N 85°31′38″W	LMS
WRSX	91.3 FM	Port Huron, Michigan	62110	120	13 m (43 ft)	A	42°58′43.1″N 82°25′44.6″W	LMS
WLNZ	89.7 FM	Lansing, Michigan	36537	420	30 m (98 ft)	A	42°44′15″N 84°33′12″W	LMS

=== WUOM ===
WUOM (91.7 FM) in Ann Arbor is the flagship station of Michigan Public, broadcasting with a 93,000 watt transmitter from a 237 meters (778 ft) tower near Pinckney. The University of Michigan applied to the FCC on September 11, 1944, for a station at 43.1 FM (part of a band of frequencies used for testing of Frequency Modulation) with a power of 50,000 watts. At the time an assignment on the new FM band was seen as a significant disadvantage.

The FCC granted a license for WUOM (for University of Michigan) at 91.7 in the brand new FM band; the station went on the air on July 5, 1948. Classical music made up a large chunk of the station's broadcast day until the late 1990s, when, faced with declining ratings and listener pledges, Michigan Radio changed its daytime programming to news and talk. Classical music programming continued for a time at night and was eventually phased out altogether.

WUOM, at 93,000 watts, is a "grandfathered superpower" station along with network sister station WVGR. According to the FCC, the same setup being newly licensed today would only be allotted 20.38 kilowatts from the same antenna height. It provides at least secondary coverage to most of the southeast quadrant of the state, from Lansing to Detroit. Although Detroit and Ann Arbor are separate radio markets, WUOM has a fairly large listener base in the Detroit area; it has long identified as "Ann Arbor/Detroit" during the network's hourly legal IDs.

=== WFUM ===
WFUM (91.1 FM), formerly WFUM-FM, licensed to the University of Michigan, is the Flint affiliate of Michigan Public which began broadcasting on August 23, 1985. It broadcasts with 17,500 watts from a HAAT of 149 meters (489 ft) up on a tower near Goodrich, near the intersection of Kipp and Washburn roads.

Until 2009, WFUM was the sister station of PBS affiliate WFUM-TV. The stations shared tower space, even after Central Michigan University (CMU) purchased the latter station in January 2010 and changed its callsign to WCMZ-TV later that year. CMU sold WCMZ-TV in the FCC spectrum auction in February 2017 and it was shut down in April 2018.

=== WVGR ===
WVGR (104.1 FM), licensed to the University of Michigan, is the Grand Rapids affiliate of Michigan Public which began broadcasting on December 7, 1961. It was named after Frederick J. Vogt, an area industrialist who became a lead benefactor for the station. For almost 40 years, WVGR blanketed West Michigan with a powerful 108,000-watt signal from an arm on local NBC affiliate WOOD-TV's tower. However, when WOOD-TV needed WVGR's old space for an HD transmitter, WVGR was forced to cut its power to 20,000 watts from space on CBS affiliate WWMT's tower. It moved to its own tower near Wayland in 2006 and boosted its power to 96,000 watts, largely restoring its original coverage area. Until WLNZ joined the network, WVGR was the only station that directly competed with another NPR member, in this case WGVU-FM and WBLV.

WVGR is a "grandfathered superpower" Class B, FM station. The maximum power that would be granted today, would be 23,500 watts effective radiated power, using the same antenna height of 221 meters (725 ft).

=== WRSX ===
WRSX (91.3 FM) is the network's Port Huron affiliate. Originally WSGR-FM, it was a college radio station broadcasting an alternative rock and freeform format and licensed to St. Clair County Community College, launched on May 28, 1974. The station provided an outlet to artists that normally wouldn't be played on commercial stations in the market. On December 6, 2017, the station signed off the air.

On December 12, 2017, St. Clair County Regional Education Service Agency (RESA) announced it would be assuming control of the station and moving its studios to its Technical Education Center in Marysville, Michigan and join its digital media technology program. The transfer of WSGR-FM's license was consummated on July 9, 2018. On August 17, 2018, RESA changed the station's call sign to WRSX, with all programming supplied from Michigan Public (at the time known as Michigan Radio) as a simulcast of Ann Arbor station WUOM 91.7 starting on September 4, 2018.

=== WLNZ ===
WLNZ (89.7 FM), licensed to Lansing Community College (LCC), is the network's newest affiliate, serving the state's capital city. The station was launched on February 11, 1994. After shutting down as an adult album alternative station on March 13, 2020 due to the COVID-19 pandemic, it was resurrected as a Michigan Public (then known as Michigan Radio) affiliate on November 15, 2021. As part of a partnership between LCC and Michigan Public, locally-produced programming will continue to air on Saturdays at 1 PM and Sundays at 6 PM. While most of Lansing can receive Michigan Public flagship WUOM very well, WLNZ reaches the few areas of Lansing without a clear signal from WUOM.

== History ==
=== Beginnings ===
Starting in the 1920s, the University of Michigan Extension Service Bureau of Broadcasting produced programs for other radio stations; for instance, in November 1944, the Bureau of Broadcasting produced "Stump the Professor" for WJR in Detroit and "The Balkan States: Places and Nations in the News" for WKAR in East Lansing. (U of M actually had a short-lived AM station of their own, WCBC, in 1924–25.)

In the early 1940s, the university applied for a new radio station, but was turned down by the Federal Communications Commission (FCC) as there were no available frequencies on the AM band at the time. (WPAG, now WTKA, would become Ann Arbor's first permanent radio station in 1945.) Around this time, U of M began working on plans for a statewide network of four FM stations to be located in Ann Arbor, Mount Pleasant, Manistique and Houghton. The university applied to the FCC on September 11, 1944 for a station at 43.1 FM (part of a band of frequencies used for testing of Frequency Modulation) with a power of 50,000 watts; by 1947, the new station was given the call letters WATX and was assigned to 42.1 FM. At the time, a station on the new FM band was seen as being at a significant disadvantage.

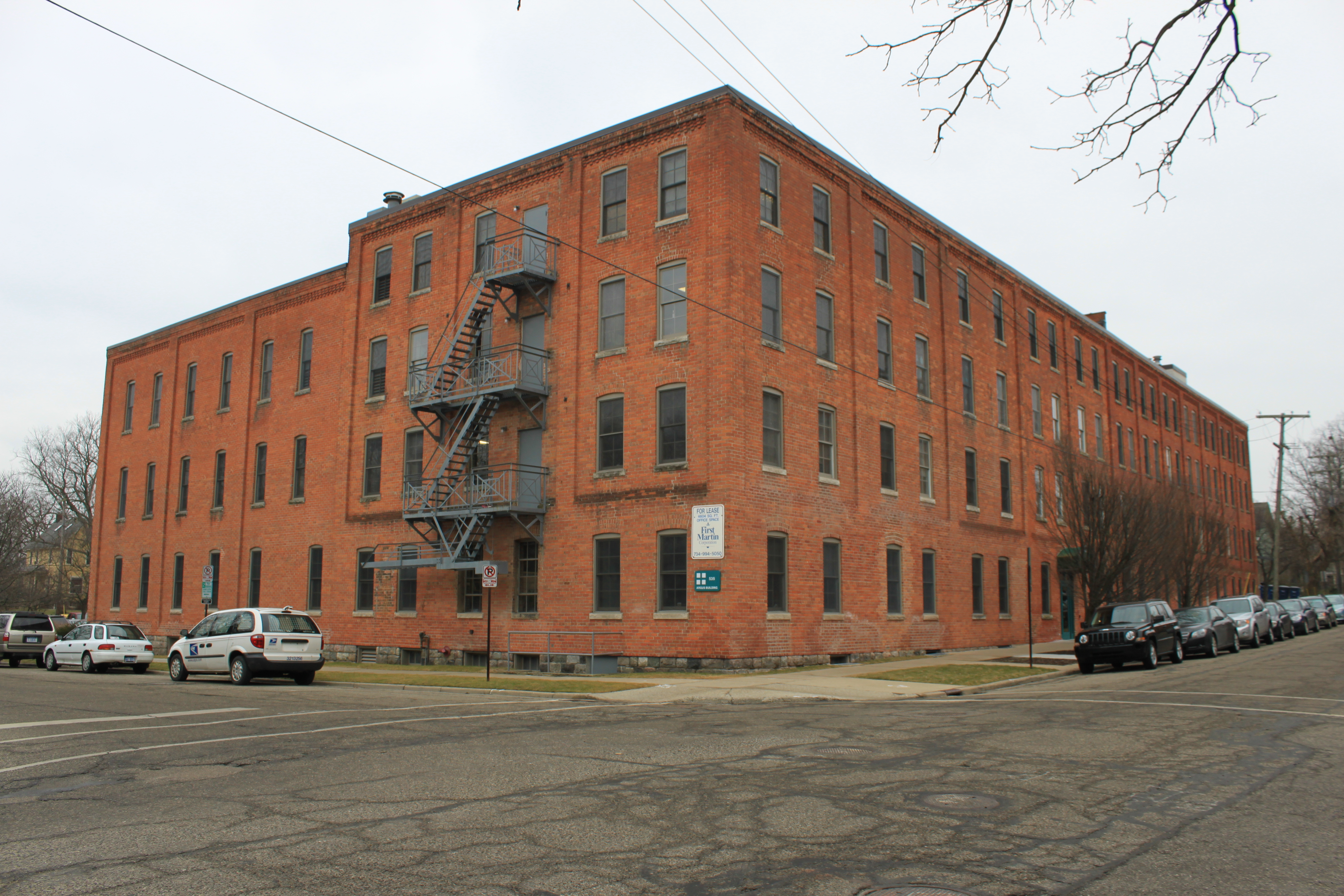
Michigan Public is headquartered in the Argus Building, a former Argus camera factory

The FCC granted a license for WUOM (for University of Michigan) at 91.7 in the brand new FM band; the station went on the air in 1948, broadcasting from studios in Angell Hall on the UM campus. In 1949 the station moved across the street to newly completed studios on the fifth floor of the Administration Building, now known as the Literature, Science & Arts Building. Michigan Radio remained in those studios until August 23, 2003, when it moved off campus to the Argus Building on Ann Arbor's Old West Side.

The university toyed with the idea of opening a TV outlet in the early 1950s: WUOM-TV was assigned a construction permit for Channel 26 in 1953, but never made it to the air. The following year, the Educational Television and Radio Center (ETRC) moved to Ann Arbor; the ETRC shifted to New York City in 1958 and eventually became National Educational Television, forerunner to the modern Public Broadcasting Service.

WFUM (for Flint University of Michigan) has been on the air at its current 91.1 frequency since August 23, 1985 when it first signed on as WFUM-FM. The original WFUM operated at 107.1 MHz during the 1950s and was also a simulcast of WUOM. WFUM (FM) was shut down after WUOM increased its power to 115,000 watts, giving it adequate coverage of Flint and meaning that WFUM, which operated with only 400 watts of power, was no longer necessary. WUOM has since reduced its power to 93,000 watts, but still can be heard with a fair signal in Flint. WFUM today operates with 17,500 watts of power. Its signal reaches the immediate area around Flint primarily but also can be heard in far northern parts of the Detroit metro area on selective radios. The current incarnation used the "-FM" extension because the WFUM callsign was also assigned to the University of Michigan's television station in Flint when the station first signed on, WFUM (TV). In 2009, the TV station was sold to Central Michigan University and the call letters changed to WCMZ-TV, so WFUM-FM adopted the simplified call letters WFUM.

WVGR (Vogt Grand Rapids, after Fred Vogt, who led the campaign for public radio in the area) has been broadcasting since December 7, 1961. It covers West Michigan with a powerful 96,000-watt signal. WVGR had long operated at 108,000 watts from rented space on NBC affiliate WOOD-TV's tower, but had to move in 1999 because WOOD needed the space for its HDTV transmitter. It temporarily moved to CBS affiliate WWMT's tower while it raised money for a new tower of its own. WVGR was forced to downgrade to a mono signal at 20,000 watts, but resumed broadcasting from its own tower in the fall of 2006.

=== Early growth ===
WUOM quickly established itself as one of the leading educational broadcasters. Because the station was not affiliated with any of the commercial radio networks, it produced nearly all the programs it broadcast in the early days. The program guide for October 1949 shows the station on the air from 12:00pm–10:00pm on weekdays (the station had just expanded into evenings), with a few hours of programs on Saturday and Sunday. The programs listed in the 1949 guide include "From the Classrooms," "Songs of France," "Tell Me, Professor," "Especially for Women," "Around the Town," "Record Rarities," "Hymns of Freedom," "Angell Hall Playhouse," and "Tea-Time Tunes." The station also offered live play-by-play of Michigan football games that month, as well as two live concerts from Hill Auditorium - recitals featuring University of Michigan faculty. Some of the programs featured recorded music, but nearly all programs were performed live to air in the first days. By the early 1950s, many of these shows were being transcribed and sent to other stations.

In the mid 1960s, the station had the largest staff of any FM radio station in the country. WUOM produced programs that were broadcast throughout Michigan on commercial and educational stations, and many of its programs aired around the country. The tapes were "bicycled" from one educational station to another.

In the 1970s and 1980s, WUOM hosted classical music Sunday through Friday, and jazz on Saturday afternoons. Radio plays were sometimes featured as well. Classical music host Peter Greenquist's "Morning Show" of classical music and news is much of the heart of the Ann Arbor community. At 11AM, "The Lecture Hour" featured a lecture from somewhere on the UM campus. Fred Hindley's noon show blended local, state, national, and international news, with interviews, University of Michigan academic content and arts news. In the afternoon, Stephen Skelly's "Afternoon Musicale" provided classical music from 1PM to 4:30PM. Sportscaster Tom Hemingway could be heard across the city on football Saturdays, often telling stories about the history of the game that only such local "townies" would be able to remember. In the 1980s, the station added a nationally syndicated New Age music program, Music from the Hearts of Space, as well as an hour of more eclectic music before the midnight sign-off, featuring the University of Michigan Men's Glee Club.

WUOM's popularity gradually decreased from the height of the 1960s, though it still retained enough prestige to become a charter member of NPR in 1971. It was one of the approximately 90 stations that aired the inaugural broadcast of All Things Considered.

In 1995 the CPB informed the station that its audience was so small that its federal funding was in jeopardy, due to new rules in line with the drastically reduced funding for public broadcasting across the United States. Around the same time, the University of Michigan commissioned a private (not public) study that recommended the university divest itself of the radio stations. The university decided against that plan.

=== Crisis and Controversy: The Format Change of 1996 ===
Donovan Reynolds became the university's director of broadcasting in 1996. He was immediately confronted with Michigan Radio's failing format, a $265,000 deficit, low staff morale, and the imminent threat of losing the stations' federal funding. Given a one-year deadline by the Corporation for Public Broadcasting to turn around the stations' dismal audience and revenue figures, he decided that only radical change could save the organization. On July 1, 1996, he switched most of the station's classical music format to news and information, and began broadcasting the NPR News/Talk stream on the first day it was offered to stations.

The decision was highly controversial. A group of classical music listeners, angered by the format change and the termination of four employees, petitioned the University of Michigan Board of Regents to reverse the changes, saying they were based on "dubious research" and had alienated the stations' core audience and contributors. But the next fund-drive, only four months later, was the most successful in the stations' history. Within 18 months, the stations' accumulated deficit was eliminated, the number of listeners increased by 30%, and revenue increased so quickly the $1.5 million budget was increased to $2.5 million. The stations' federal funding had been saved.

By 2002, Michigan Radio was one of the fastest growing public radio stations in the country and the 11th most listened to NPR station. As one of the first successful news/talk public radio stations on FM, Michigan Radio may have helped influence similarly transitions to that format by stations including WUNC in Chapel Hill, North Carolina, WBUR-FM in Boston, WAMU in Washington, DC, KPCC in Pasadena, California, WHYY-FM in Philadelphia and WBEZ in Chicago. For several years after 1996, Michigan Radio's rise was a case study in the public radio industry, including in Iowa, where the Bornstein and Associates Report on Iowa Public Radio consolidation devotes a chapter to studying Michigan Radio's format change.

The Michigan Radio network rebranded as Michigan Public on January 10, 2024.

=== Current programming ===
Michigan Public provides a variety of programs from NPR and American Public Media. In addition, Michigan Public broadcasts the BBC World Service as distributed by APM during the late night and early morning hours. In 2012, the station created its daily, locally produced talk show, Stateside, which covers a wide range of Michigan news and policy issues — as well as culture and lifestyle stories. Stateside was originally hosted by Cynthia Canty (Mon-Thu) and Lester Graham (Fri). The current host of Stateside is April Baer.

Local hosts include Doug Tribou (mornings during Morning Edition), Christina Shockley (afternoons during All Things Considered), Mike Perini (middays), and Christopher Johnson (weekend mornings). The news staff includes Steve Carmody, Dustin Dwyer, Lindsey Smith, Kate Wells, Sarah Cwiek, Rebecca Kruth, Tracy Samilton, Sarah Hulett, Colin Jackson, and news director Vincent Duffy. Michigan Public produces The Environment Report, sports commentary from John U. Bacon, the latest political happenings in Lansing on It's Just Politics and That's What They Say, a weekend feature from UM English Professor Anne Curzan that explores our changing language and discusses why we say what we say.

In 2018, reporters Kate Wells and Lindsey Smith produced "Believed," a podcast on the Larry Nassar case which went on to win a Peabody Award.

=== Accolades ===
Year	Award	Category	Nominee(s)	Result	Ref.
2022	Peabody Awards	Podcast & Radio	Nine days in a Michigan abortion clinic, as election looms	Nominated	

== See also ==
- Michigan Sports Network, which airs football and men's basketball games of the University of Michigan
