= Believed (podcast) =

Documentary podcast

Believed is a documentary miniseries podcast hosted by Kate Wells and Lindsey Smith and produced by NPR.

== Background ==
The podcast was a collaboration between NPR and Michigan Radio. The podcast is hosted by Kate Wells and Lindsey Smith. Wells and Smith were part of Michigan Radio's flint water crisis investigation team. The podcast investigates the USA Gymnastics sex abuse scandal and Larry Nassar specifically. The podcast was made during the MeToo movement. The podcast debuted in late October 2018 and reached number one on the Apple Podcasts Charts by October 29, 2018. The first episode is entitled "The Good Guy". The second episode in the podcast features an interview with Brianne Randall-Gay.

Wells and Smith spoke at DePauw University about sexual abuse.

Malcolm Gladwell's used content from the podcast in both an audio and print version of his book Talking to Strangers.

=== Awards ===
| Award | Date | Category | Result | Ref. |
|---|---|---|---|---|
| Peabody Awards | 2018 | Radio & Podcast | Won | |
| Scripps Howard Awards | 2019 | | Won | |
| Livingston Awards | 2019 | Local Reporting | Won | |
