= The Radio Reader =

American radio program

- Country of origin: United States
- Language: English
- Home station: WKAR
- Original release: 1934 – March 2016

The Radio Reader is a daily half-hour radio program that was heard on 100 public radio stations in the United States. It was hosted and produced by Dick Estell from 1964 to 2016 and claimed an audience of 1.5 million listeners. Starting after Estell's retirement from Michigan State University in 1986, the show was recorded and produced in his home studio in Haslett, Michigan, near East Lansing.

The program actually dated back to 1934 and was initially called The Radio Reading Circle at WKAR, Michigan State's public radio station. Broadcasts were 15 minutes and had no regular reader. Station manager Robert Coleman became the first regular reader and changed the name to its current one. Larry Frymire became the regular reader in 1944, and continued until he retired and was succeeded by Estell, hired by WKAR in 1952. Until the Estell era, it was heard only in Michigan markets and read an array of books ranging from classics such as Pride and Prejudice to modern works.

With permission from authors, Estell only read recently released books, often selecting best-sellers. The shows began with a minimal introduction and brief summary of the book so far and the previous day's reading, transitioning into the direct reading of a portion of the book. As of May 2006, he had read over 500 books over the air. About 12 books were read each year.

The show was first recorded on an Ampex 601, a practice that continued into the 1980s. The recordings were mailed by WKAR in Michigan to other stations for broadcast. In 1979 NPR stations became connected by satellite, and the show began to be distributed that way. Until the mid-1990s the show was recorded onto reel-to-reel tape, but as that became obsolete the switch was made to Digital Audio Tape and then MiniDiscs.

In 2006, the recordings began to be distributed by FTP and e-mail and via streaming over the internet by certain radio stations.

Due to failing health, Estell's final broadcast was in March 2016. He died two months later.
