= WUCX-FM =

Radio station in Bay City, Michigan

- Bay City, Michigan; United States
- Broadcast area: Saginaw-Bay City-Midland
- Frequency: 90.1 MHz (HD Radio)
- Branding: Delta College Public Radio

Programming
- Format: News/talk, variety
- Subchannels: HD2: Classical "WCMU Classical"
- Affiliations: National Public Radio; American Public Media; Public Radio Exchange; BBC World Service

Ownership
- Owner: Central Michigan University
- Operator: operated jointly by Delta College and CMU
- Sister stations: WCMU-FM; WCMU-TV; WDCQ-TV

History
- First air date: September 27, 1989
- Call sign meaning: University Center X

Technical information
- Licensing authority: FCC
- Facility ID: 9921
- Class: C2
- Power: 30,000 watts
- HAAT: 146 meters (479 ft)
- Transmitter coordinates: 43°33′10″N 83°41′24″W

Links
- Public license information: Public file; LMS
- Webcast: Listen Live
- Website: deltabroadcasting.org/radio

WUCX-FM, 90.1 MHz in Bay City, Michigan, is a public radio station licensed to Central Michigan University and operated jointly with Delta College. It airs programming (both local and syndicated) separate from WCMU-FM (89.5 MHz) between 5 a.m. and 3 p.m. on weekdays, from 6 a.m. until 6 p.m. on Saturdays, and from 6 a.m. until 12 p.m on Sundays. The station simulcasts WCMU-FM for the remainder of the time. WUCX-FM, which went on the air in September 1989, identified as "Q90.1" (with the "Q" standing for "Quality", after its television counterpart and PBS member, WDCQ-TV (channel 19)) until 2020 during non-simulcast day parts. Programming offers a mixture of news and talk (including programming from National Public Radio, American Public Media, Public Radio Exchange, and BBC World Service), as well as several types of music. WUCX-FM is the only station in the Saginaw, Midland, and Bay City metropolitan area that broadcasts in the HD Radio format.

WUCX-FM and WDCQ-TV share studios at the Frank N. Andersen Broadcast Center on the campus of Delta College on Delta Road in University Center, an unincorporated community in Frankenlust Township in southwestern Bay County; WUCX-FM's transmitter is located on Dutcher Road near Van Buren Road in the northwest corner of Tuscola County, and broadcasts on a tower shared with commercial station WHNN (96.1 FM), owned by Cumulus Media.
