= WLNZ =

Radio station in Lansing, Michigan

Lansing, Michigan; United States
- Frequency: 89.7 MHz (HD Radio)
- Branding: Michigan Public

Programming
- Format: Public radio
- Affiliations: Michigan Public; National Public Radio; American Public Media; Public Radio International; BBC World Service

Ownership
- Owner: Lansing Community College

History
- First air date: February 11, 1994
- Call sign meaning: Lansing

Technical information
- Licensing authority: FCC
- Facility ID: 36537
- Class: A
- Power: 420 watts
- HAAT: 30 meters
- Transmitter coordinates: 42°44′15″N 84°33′12″W

Links
- Public license information: Public file; LMS
- Website: www.lcc.edu/radio/

WLNZ (89.7 FM) is a non-commercial radio station located in Lansing, Michigan, simulcasting the regional Michigan Public network of public radio stations. The station is owned by Lansing Community College.

== History ==
Originally WLNZ wanted to be branded as WLNS, however, WLNS had already been taken by WLNS-TV, a local CBS affiliate, so it landed on WLNZ.

=== Technical ===
The station began broadcasting on February 11, 1994, with 100 watts. Power was increased to 420 watts in 2001. WLNZ began broadcasting in HD in 2006.

=== Programming ===
Programming originally consisted mainly of jazz and blues music, but it changed formats to adult album alternative typically throughout the daytime hours weekdays, with different programming on the weekend. The station typically played "Triple-A" music, but ventured out to many genres of music, branding itself as the "True Variety Station".

The station featured a lot of Michigan music and shows dedicated to Michigan artists throughout the day. These features ranged from the "Local Lunch Hour", where nothing but Michigan music was played, to the "M-89.7" artist spotlight, where one Michigan artist or band is chosen to be "spotlighted" through one whole month.

Each morning there was a live local talk show called Coffee Break, which was televised in the Lansing area on Comcast local public-access television. WLNZ's original jazz format continued on its HD2 subchannel, which was branded as Jazz Now!.

=== Closure ===
WLNZ ceased operations March 13, 2020 as a result of the COVID-19 pandemic. It announced June 18, 2020 that it would permanently sign off June 30, however the school's president contradicted this report on June 22.

=== Partnership with Michigan Public ===
WLNZ started simulcasting the programs of Michigan Public (at the time known as "Michigan Radio") on November 15, 2021. As part of the deal between Lansing Community College and Michigan Public, the college continues to provide locally produced programming every Saturday at 1 PM, and every Sunday at 6 PM. Most of Lansing gets a decent signal from Michigan Public flagship WUOM-FM in Ann Arbor.
