= WCMU-TV =

Television station in Mount Pleasant, Michigan

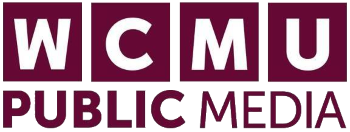
- Mount Pleasant, Michigan; United States
- Channels: Digital: 26 (UHF); Virtual: 14
- Branding: WCMU Public Television

Programming
- Affiliations: 14.1: PBS; for others, see § Subchannels

Ownership
- Owner: Central Michigan University
- Sister stations: WCMU-FM/WUCX-FM

History
- First air date: March 29, 1967
- Former channel numbers: Analog: 14 (UHF, 1967–2009)
- Former affiliations: NET (1967–1970)
- Call sign meaning: Central Michigan University

Technical information
- Licensing authority: FCC
- Facility ID: 9908
- ERP: 450 kW
- HAAT: 298 m (978 ft)
- Transmitter coordinates: 43°45′5.1″N 85°12′46.2″W

Links
- Public license information: Public file; LMS
- Website: www.wcmu.org

WCMU-TV (channel 14) is a PBS member television station in Mount Pleasant, Michigan, United States, owned by Central Michigan University. The station's studios are located at the Public Broadcast Center on the CMU campus on East Campus Drive in Mount Pleasant, and its transmitter is located 3 miles (5 km) west of Barryton, Michigan.

WCMU-TV operates three satellite stations: WCMW (channel 21) in Manistee (with transmitter northeast of Ludington), WCMV (channel 27) in Cadillac (with transmitter east of Kalkaska), and WCML (channel 6) in Alpena (with transmitter north of Atlanta, Michigan). Collectively branded as WCMU Public Television, the four stations cover an area spanning three television markets and small portions of several others. They are sister stations to WCMU Public Radio under the WCMU Public Media umbrella.

The network's footprint extends into parts of four markets. Although Mount Pleasant is part of the Flint–Saginaw–Bay City market, WCMU Public Television is the PBS member for the Traverse City–Cadillac and Alpena markets, where most of its viewership is located. Its footprint also extends into parts of the Lansing and Grand Rapids–Kalamazoo–Battle Creek markets; WCMU-TV's transmitter is located in the Grand Rapids market.

== History ==
WCMU came to the air on March 29, 1967. It expanded into a network in the mid-1970s and early 1980s. Its Manistee and Cadillac satellites brought over-the-air public television to Northern Michigan for the first time.

In January 2010, WCMU-TV began airing 24 hours a day, and launched an HD feed.

=== Acquisition of WFUM ===
On October 27, 2009, it was announced that the CMU Board of Trustees approved a proposal for CMU to acquire Flint, Michigan's PBS member station, WFUM (later WCMZ-TV), from the University of Michigan–Flint for a maximum of $1 million. The sale was approved by the FCC, allowing the network's presence to expand further south, not only including Flint, but also Ann Arbor and into Metro Detroit. The network provided at least secondary over-the-air coverage from far Northern Emmet County to northern Monroe County. While WFUM was folded into the CMU Public Television network, CMU vowed to include Flint-area events and issues in its programming, as well as produce new programming that would originate from the region. CMU believed the acquisition of WFUM will increase its viewership from 2.2 million to 8 million. CMU originally hinted that the takeover of WFUM would begin in late November, but WCMU took over operations of WFUM on January 15, 2010. The FCC approved the sale of WFUM in March and CMU officially took over in May at which point the call letters were changed to WCMZ-TV.

On February 8, 2017, Central Michigan University announced it will sell WCMZ-TV in the FCC spectrum auction for $14 million, claiming its viewers are already able to watch PBS on other nearby affiliates, namely Delta College's WDCQ-TV. It signed off on April 23, 2018.

=== WCML transmitter fire ===
On February 28, 2024, a fire broke out at the WCML transmitter building in Montmorency Township, knocking out over-the-air PBS service to northeast Michigan, along with radio sister WCML-FM (91.7). The transmitter building was a total loss, and both stations would be off the air for several months as a complete rebuild of the site will be required. Cable carriage and streaming of both stations were not impacted by the outage. By March 9, WCMU updated their website, and the exact cause of the fire was unable to be determined.

On July 30, 2024, WCML TV and FM both returned to the air at 50% power, with an estimated coverage percentage at around 70% of the normal full power coverage area. WCMU Public Media anticipated a permanent full power restoration of both signals would not occur until sometime in 2025. On November 21, 2025, WCML TV resumed full power operations.

== Technical information ==
=== Subchannels ===
The stations' signals are multiplexed:

WCMU Public Media multiplex
Subchannel	Res.	Short name	Programming
xx.1	1080i	CMU PBS	PBS
xx.2	720p	CMUkids	PBS Kids
xx.3	480i	@create	Create
xx.4	480i	CMU MLC	Michigan Learning Channel
xx.5	480i	CMU FNX	First Nations Experience

The entire network discontinued analog service on March 31, 2009.

Unlike other major stations in the Traverse City–Cadillac–Sault Ste. Marie market, CMU Public Television does not have marketwide coverage. Following the 2009 digital transition, the network lost significant coverage. WCML decently penetrated most of the Eastern Upper Peninsula before the analog shutdown. With the switch to digital, residents of the Eastern Upper Peninsula (except for those on the Lake Huron shoreline) were no longer able to receive WCML due to its 300 kW UHF signal. Currently, WCMU Public Media has no plans to add transmitters in the Eastern U.P. All PBS service, whether from CMU Public Television or another station, is available in that region only via cable or satellite. Some cable systems in that region carry another PBS station instead of WCMU — in Sault Ste. Marie, Michigan, Marquette's WNMU is seen on Charter, while across the locks in Sault Ste. Marie, Ontario, Shaw carries Detroit's WTVS instead mainly because of the lack of a local over-the-air signal to the nearly 90,000 people in the twin Saults and Eastern U.P. (Shaw previously carried WNMU for that same reason before it was replaced by WTVS in 2002.)

== Satellite stations ==
Station	City of license	Channels (VC/RF)	First air date	Call letters' meaning	ERP	HAAT	Facility ID	Transmitter coordinates	Public license information
WCML	Alpena	6; 24 (UHF)	November 21, 1975	Central Michigan Alpena	300 kW	393 m (1,289 ft)	9917	45°8′18″N 84°9′45″W	Public file LMS
WCMV	Cadillac	27; 34 (UHF)	September 7, 1984	V - first letter after U	338 kW	393 m (1,289 ft)	9922	44°44′53″N 85°4′8″W	Public file LMS
WCMW	Manistee	21; 20 (UHF)	September 7, 1984	W - second letter after U	70 kW	134 m (440 ft)	9913	44°3′57″N 86°19′58″W	Public file LMS

WCMU-TV was previously relayed on W46AD in Traverse City and W69AV in Leland; however, the transmitters ceased operations before their licenses were canceled by the FCC on September 7, 2011.

WCML once carried the -TV suffix.
