= Neighborhoods of Kalamazoo, Michigan =

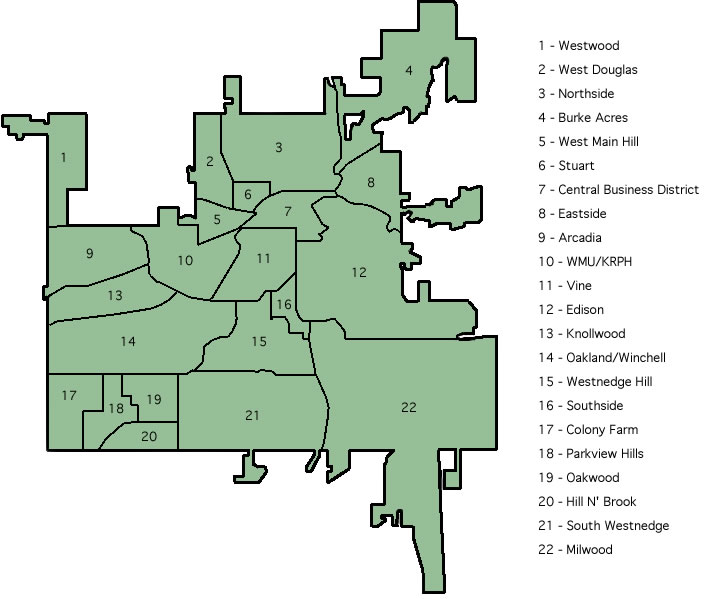
Neighborhoods of the City of Kalamazoo.

The city of Kalamazoo, Michigan consists of multiple neighborhoods. While the number, borders, and naming of neighborhoods can vary by source, the list below gives the most widely agreed upon arrangement, as defined by the City of Kalamazoo. Many of the neighborhoods have a corresponding neighborhood association.

== Arcadia ==
The Arcadia neighborhood is on the west side of Kalamazoo, bounded on the south by West Michigan Avenue and on the east by Howard Street. Kalamazoo Township and the Westwood neighborhood lie to the north, and Oshtemo Township is to the west. There are approximately four hundred single-family residences in the neighborhood, which are the primary focus of the Arcadia Neighborhood Association. The northern area of the neighborhood contains natural, undeveloped areas.

As of the 2000 census, the population of the Arcadia neighborhood was 3529 persons living in 1647 households. The racial makeup of the neighborhood was 81.30% White, 9.49% Black or African American, 0.43% Native American, 5.02% Asian, 0.00% Native Hawaiian or Pacific Islander, 1.25% from other races, and 2.52% from two or more races. 2.21% of the population were Hispanic or Latino of any race.

== Burke Acres ==
Burke Acres comprises the northeast corner of the City of Kalamazoo, bounded by the City of Parchment to the north, Kalamazoo River to the west, and Gull Road to the south. Averill and Spring Valley Lakes are within the neighborhood, and the City's Spring Valley Park comprises a large portion of the neighborhood's area. A large portion of the neighborhood was platted from the former Burke farm. Many houses in the neighborhood were erected in the 1950s and 1960s. There is currently no neighborhood association for Burke Acres.

As of the 2000 census, the population of the Burke Acres neighborhood was 3481 persons living in 1414 households. The racial makeup of the neighborhood was 69.64% White, 23.04% Black or African American, 0.43% Native American, 1.09% Asian, 0.00% Native Hawaiian or Pacific Islander, 1.87% from other races, and 3.94% from two or more races. 2.61% of the population were Hispanic or Latino of any race.

== Central Business District/Center ==
The Central Business District, or downtown Kalamazoo, is divided into six districts: Arcadia, Bronson Park, East End, Haymarket, Kalamazoo Mall, and South Town. Educational and cultural venues include the Kalamazoo Valley Museum, the central branch of the Kalamazoo Public Library, and the Kalamazoo Institute of Arts. The city's nightlife is centered here and includes several nightclubs and microbreweries. The Kalamazoo Transportation Center is on the north end of the CBD.

As of the 2000 census, 1,420 people in 604 households lived in the Central Business District. The racial makeup of the district was 75.49% White, 18.45% Black or African American, 0.92% Native American, 1.27% Asian, 0.07% Native Hawaiian or Pacific Islander, 0.35% from other races, and 3.45% from two or more races. 2.18% of the population were Hispanic or Latino of any race.

The area's development is fostered by the private, non-profit Downtown Kalamazoo, Inc.

== Colony Farm ==
Located in the southwest corner of Kalamazoo, Colony Farm is home to Western Michigan University's Business, Technology & Research Park, as well as a small residential population. There is no neighborhood association in the area.

As of the 2000 census, the population of the Colony Farm neighborhood was 371 persons living in 177 households. The racial makeup of the neighborhood was 89.76% White, 4.04% Black or African American, 0.27% Native American, 1.35% Asian, 0.00% Native Hawaiian or Pacific Islander, 0.27% from other races, and 4.31% from two or more races. 0.81% of the population were Hispanic or Latino of any race.

== Eastside ==
Eastside, along with Burke Acres, is one of the two neighborhoods of Kalamazoo located on the east side of the Kalamazoo River. The neighborhood contains two city parks and is situated on the hills which overlook the center of the city from the east. Residents are served by the Eastside Neighborhood Association.

As of the 2000 census, the population of the Eastside neighborhood was 2673 persons living in 883 households. The racial makeup of the neighborhood was 31.31% White, 58.51% Black or African American, 1.80% Native American, 0.41% Asian, 0.22% Native Hawaiian or Pacific Islander, 2.84% from other races, and 4.90% from two or more races. 5.09% of the population were Hispanic or Latino of any race.

== Edison ==
The most populous neighborhood in Kalamazoo, Edison is located on the east side of the city. It is home to the bulk of the city's Hispanic population. Four of the city's parks are located in the Edison neighborhood, including the Mayor's Riverfront Park, where the Kalamazoo Growlers and Kalamazoo Kingdom sports teams play. Residents are served by the Edison Neighborhood Association.

As of the 2000 census, the population of the Edison neighborhood was 9415 persons living in 3288 households. The racial makeup of the neighborhood was 56.14% White, 27.59% Black or African American, 1.39% Native American, 0.72% Asian, 0.10% Native Hawaiian or Pacific Islander, 8.39% from other races, and 5.66% from two or more races. 13.24% of the population were Hispanic or Latino of any race.

== Hill 'N' Brook ==
As of the 2000 census, the population of the Hill 'N' Brook neighborhood was 451 persons living in 188 households. The racial makeup of the neighborhood was 89.58% White, 4.21% Black or African American, 0.00% Native American, 4.43% Asian, 0.00% Native Hawaiian or Pacific Islander, 0.89% from other races, and 0.89% from two or more races. 2.00% of the population were Hispanic or Latino of any race.

== Knollwood ==
The Knollwood neighborhood lies on the west side of the city, adjacent to Western Michigan University. As such, there is a good deal of student housing in Knollwood, especially on the east side closer to campus. Unlike other student housing areas, such as the Stuart and West Main Hill Neighborhoods, which feature individual houses and portions of houses for rent, housing in Knollwood is primarily in apartment complexes. Knollwood is also home to a number of Western Michigan University's sorority and fraternity houses. There is currently no neighborhood association in the area.

As of the 2000 census, the population of the Knollwood neighborhood was 5633 persons living in 2101 households. The racial makeup of the neighborhood was 74.28% White, 14.17% Black or African American, 0.53% Native American, 5.04% Asian, 0.04% Native Hawaiian or Pacific Islander, 2.54% from other races, and 3.41% from two or more races. 4.69% of the population were Hispanic or Latino of any race.

== Milwood ==
The Milwood neighborhood occupies the southeast corner of the city, and includes a large projection to the south encompassing the Kalamazoo-Battle Creek International Airport. Milwood is the second largest neighborhood in the city in terms of population, and is the largest in area at 12.6 km^{2}. Most of the housing, consisting largely of single-family dwellings, lies in the north and west portions of the neighborhood, with the east remaining largely undeveloped. Residents are served by the Milwood Neighborhood Watch Association.

As of the 2000 census, the population of the Milwood neighborhood was 7918 persons living in 3632 households. The racial makeup of the neighborhood was 87.61% White, 7.60% Black or African American, 0.45% Native American, 0.87% Asian, 0.00% Native Hawaiian or Pacific Islander, 1.23% from other races, and 2.24% from two or more races. 2.75% of the population were Hispanic or Latino of any race.

== Northside ==
Northside is home to over one quarter of the city's African American population (as of the 2000 census), and along with the Eastside neighborhood is one of the two communities in Kalamazoo wherein African Americans form a majority. The Northside is home to a number of the city's parks, as well as a large concentration of social services providers. Neighborhood residents are served by the Northside Association for Community Development.

As of the 2000 census, the population of the Northside neighborhood was 5669 persons living in 1965 households. The racial makeup of the neighborhood was 10.83% White, 83.35% Black or African American, 0.42% Native American, 0.19% Asian, 0.05% Native Hawaiian or Pacific Islander, 2.17% from other races, and 2.98% from two or more races. 4.07% of the population were Hispanic or Latino of any race.

== Oakland / Winchell ==
The Oakland / Winchell neighborhood is located on the west side of the city and named for the two main streets near which the bulk of its residents live. The western third of the neighborhood is largely undeveloped green space, centered around Asylum Lake. In the southeast corner are two city parks, both on the edge of Woods Lake. Residents are served by the Oakland Drive / Winchell Avenue Neighborhood Association.

The south shore of Woods Lake, along the border with the Oakwood neighborhood, is the former site of a succession of popular amusement parks which lasted from the 1890s to 1920s. The western shore of Woods Lake is home to Woods Lake Beach Park, which is open to the public every summer. The park has undergone several major improvements, including demolition of the previous restroom building, construction of a new restroom building with drinking fountains, and creation of a wooden dock for fishing.

As of the 2000 census, the population of the Oakland / Winchell neighborhood was 4299 persons living in 1903 households. The racial makeup of the neighborhood was 87.88% White, 7.70% Black or African American, 0.19% Native American, 2.26% Asian, 0.00% Native Hawaiian or Pacific Islander, 0.44% from other races, and 1.54% from two or more races. 1.21% of the population were Hispanic or Latino of any race.

== Oakwood ==
The Oakwood Neighborhood Association is one of the oldest in the city, having incorporated in 1947, although the region itself was not annexed to the city until 1957.

As of the 2000 census, the population of the Oakwood neighborhood was 1382 persons living in 609 households. The racial makeup of the neighborhood was 90.59% White, 4.12% Black or African American, 0.58% Native American, 0.72% Asian, 0.00% Native Hawaiian or Pacific Islander, 2.24% from other races, and 1.74% from two or more races. 3.04% of the population were Hispanic or Latino of any race.

== Parkview Hills ==
As of the 2000 census, the population of the Parkview Hills neighborhood was 1125 persons living in 693 households. The racial makeup of the neighborhood was 90.84% White, 3.02% Black or African American, 0.27% Native American, 3.64% Asian, 0.09% Native Hawaiian or Pacific Islander, 0.27% from other races, and 1.87% from two or more races. 1.60% of the population were Hispanic or Latino of any race.

== South Westnedge ==
As of the 2000 census, the population of the South Westnedge neighborhood was 5266 persons living in 2429 households. The racial makeup of the neighborhood was 85.24% White, 8.79% Black or African American, 0.34% Native American, 1.90% Asian, 0.17% Native Hawaiian or Pacific Islander, 0.72% from other races, and 2.83% from two or more races. 2.05% of the population were Hispanic or Latino of any race.

== Southside ==
As of the 2000 census, the population of the Southside neighborhood was 795 persons living in 305 households. The racial makeup of the neighborhood was 75.72% White, 15.35% Black or African American, 0.88% Native American, 0.63% Asian, 0.00% Native Hawaiian or Pacific Islander, 2.52% from other races, and 4.91% from two or more races. 5.28% of the population were Hispanic or Latino of any race.

== Stuart ==
Located just northwest of the central business district, the Stuart area began as an early suburb of Kalamazoo when US Senator Charles Stuart began constructing a home here in 1854. Initially a wealthy area of small population density, the neighborhood opened up to the middle class when horse-drawn trolley car service began connecting it to the city center in the 1880s. Many of the Historic Stuart Neighborhood's homes date back to this late 19th-century population boom, and there are a large number of well-preserved residences in styles such as Queen Anne and Italianate. The neighborhood is listed on the National Register of Historic Places.

Residents and property owners are served by the Stuart Area Restoration Association, a 501(c)(3) charitable organization founded in 1973. The Association owns 530 Douglas, Kalamazoo, MI and uses this 1910 American Four Square style house as office, neighborhood center, and plant-sharing garden.

As of the 2000 census, the population of the Stuart neighborhood was 1011 persons living in 536 households. The racial makeup of the neighborhood was 73.69% White, 18.69% Black or African American, 0.40% Native American, 0.89% Asian, 0.30% Native Hawaiian or Pacific Islander, 1.48% from other races, and 4.55% from two or more races. 2.47% of the population were Hispanic or Latino of any race.

== Vine ==
Vine's boundaries are West Lovell Street to the north, Oakland Drive to the west, Crosstown Parkway to the south, and South Burdick Street to the east. The neighborhood includes the Vine Area Historic District, which was listed on the National Register of Historic Places in 1983.

One of the oldest neighborhoods in Kalamazoo, the Vine has houses dating to the 1840s. During the early 1900s, businesses in the Vine flourished, including a variety of grocery and retail spaces. During the Great Depression, many houses built for single families were split into multiple residences. In the 1970s, the neighborhood became a destination for students attending nearby Western Michigan University, Kalamazoo College and Kalamazoo Valley Community College at the downtown campus, garnering the name "student ghetto".

In 2009, about 80% of residents were students, but many students have moved to new apartments on the west side of town, leaving Vine apartments vacant.

In December 2009, a neighborhood revitalization plan was unveiled to reduce crime and improve the area's commercial and economic development. Landlords have been improving their properties to attract students to the area.

In 2009, the Vine was described by the national magazine This Old House as one of the best places for families to buy an old house. The magazine cited the Vine's proximity to downtown, schools, parks, hiking trails and playgrounds.

Since 1980, Vine Neighborhood, Kalamazoo residents have been served by the Vine Neighborhood Association.

Schools in the neighborhood include El Sol Elementary, Kalamazoo Area Math and Science Center and a Montessori School.

As of the 2000 census, the population of the Vine neighborhood was 6079 persons living in 2656 households. The racial makeup of the neighborhood was 78.65% White, 13.23% Black or African American, 0.77% Native American, 1.25% Asian, 0.07% Native Hawaiian or Pacific Islander, 2.24% from other races, and 3.80% from two or more races. 4.39% of the population were Hispanic or Latino of any race.

== West Douglas / Fairmont ==
As of the 2000 census, the population of the West Douglas / Fairmont neighborhood was 2550 persons living in 1004 households. The racial makeup of the neighborhood was 57.88% White, 32.78% Black or African American, 0.51% Native American, 0.82% Asian, 0.00% Native Hawaiian or Pacific Islander, 3.53% from other races, and 4.47% from two or more races. 5.33% of the population were Hispanic or Latino of any race.

== West Main Hill ==
As of the 2000 census, the population of the West Main Hill neighborhood was 1661 persons living in 346 households. The racial makeup of the neighborhood was 90.67% White, 3.01% Black or African American, 0.00% Native American, 3.37% Asian, 0.00% Native Hawaiian or Pacific Islander, 1.32% from other races, and 1.63% from two or more races. 2.11% of the population were Hispanic or Latino of any race.

== Western Michigan University / KRPH ==
As of the 2000 census, the population of the Western Michigan University / Kalamazoo Regional Psychiatric Hospital neighborhood was 7245 persons living in 630 households. The racial makeup of the neighborhood was 77.16% White, 10.95% Black or African American, 0.19% Native American, 8.83% Asian, 0.17% Native Hawaiian or Pacific Islander, 0.90% from other races, and 1.81% from two or more races. 2.24% of the population were Hispanic or Latino of any race.

== Westnedge Hill ==
As of the 2000 census, the population of the Westnedge Hill neighborhood was 3027 persons living in 1388 households. The racial makeup of the neighborhood was 87.58% White, 7.30% Black or African American, 0.17% Native American, 1.42% Asian, 0.00% Native Hawaiian or Pacific Islander, 0.96% from other races, and 2.58% from two or more races. 2.02% of the population were Hispanic or Latino of any race.

== Westwood ==
As of the 2000 census, the population of the Westwood neighborhood was 2145 persons living in 1015 households. The racial makeup of the neighborhood was 81.17% White, 14.17% Black or African American, 0.23% Native American, 2.24% Asian, 0.00% Native Hawaiian or Pacific Islander, 0.93% from other races, and 1.26% from two or more races. 2.14% of the population were Hispanic or Latino of any race.
