= WCMU-FM =

Public radio station at Central Michigan University in Mount Pleasant, Michigan

Coordinates: 43.573°N 84.773°W

- Mount Pleasant, Michigan; United States
- Broadcast area: Central Michigan, Northern Lower Peninsula and Northern Michigan
- Frequency: 89.5 MHz (HD Radio)
- Branding: WCMU Public Radio

Programming
- Format: News/Talk
- Subchannels: HD2: Classical
- Affiliations: NPR, PRX, APM, BBC

Ownership
- Owner: Central Michigan University
- Sister stations: WUCX-FM; WCMU-TV

History
- First air date: April 6, 1964 (at 90.1 MHz)
- Call sign meaning: Central Michigan University

Technical information
- Facility ID: 9918
- Class: C1
- ERP: 100,000 watts
- HAAT: 130 meters (430 ft)

Links
- Webcast: Listen live
- Website: WCMU-FM

WCMU-FM (89.5 FM) is a public radio station in Mount Pleasant, Michigan. The station, owned by Central Michigan University, is a National Public Radio member station, airing a news/talk format along with a variety of other programming. It is the flagship station of a network called WCMU Public Radio made up of six other affiliate stations in Northern Michigan.

== Programming ==
WCMU Public Radio broadcasts news and talk programming during the week, including Morning Edition, All Things Considered, 1A, Fresh Air, Here and Now, and On Point. On weekends, the station airs a mix of news, talk, entertainment and music programs. These include national shows like Weekend Edition, Wait Wait... Don't Tell Me!, and This American Life, and local music programs such as The Juke Joint, Homespun, and Destination Out. Overnight, WCMU airs programming from the BBC World Service.

== History ==
WCMU-FM was originally a 10-watt campus radio station at 90.1, signing on on April 6, 1964. During its early years, the station broadcast a wide variety of programming aimed at the campus population of the university, including classical, popular music, and progressive rock. By 1969 the station was an affiliate of the National Educational Radio Network, which became NPR in 1970, and since then, the station has broadcast primarily classical and jazz music and news. WCMU-FM moved to 89.5 with 100,000 watts of power in the mid-1970s, and in 1978 began to add a series of rebroadcaster stations around central and northern Michigan, beginning with WCML-FM in Alpena.

WCMU launched its current format on March 1, 2023. The same day, it launched a 24/7 classical music station called WCMU Classical. The classical service can be heard online, on the station's mobile app, on smart speakers, and on its HD-2 sub channel in the communities of Mount Pleasant, Alpena, Harbor Springs, and Bay City.

Prior to March 1, 2023, WCMU Public Radio was a mixed-format station, airing news programming from NPR, and locally hosted classical, jazz and blues programming. Previously aired programs include Nightside Jazz and Blues, Take Five, The Beat, Central Stage, Afternoon Classical and Mosaic.

The station won regional Edward R. Murrow Awards in 2023, 2022, 2021, and 2018. The station has received multiple awards from the Michigan Association of Broadcasters, and was MAB Public Station of the Year for 2002. Producers and Hosts including David Nicholas, Rick Westover, Mike Horace, Amy Robinson, Robert Barclay, Ben Thorpe, Brett Dahlberg, Jamie Lynn Gilbert, Sara Bingham and Eileen LaTarte have also won state awards.

== Affiliates ==
The station also serves most of Northern Michigan, including the eastern Upper Peninsula, through a network of affiliate stations:

Callsign	Frequency	City of license	Broadcast Area	First air date	Former callsigns
WCMB-FM	95.7 FM	Oscoda, MI		September 1998	WCMV-FM (12/20/96–2/13/98)
WCML-FM	91.7 FM	Alpena, MI		April 1978	none
WCMW-FM	103.9 FM	Harbor Springs, MI		August 1988 (as WLTO)	WLTO (4/6/88–9/24/93)
WCMZ-FM	98.3 FM	Sault Ste. Marie, MI		July 1990	none
WCMV-FM	94.3 FM	Leland, MI	[5]	April 30, 2020	WFCX (2/24/2003-12/5/2019)
WWCM	96.9 FM	Standish, MI	[6]	December 1989 (as WSTD)	off-air (11/23/99–11/17/00); WSTD (12/28/94–11/23/99); WCYY (7/8/94–12/28/94); WSTD (6/3/88–7/8/94)

WCMW Harbor Springs and WWCM Standish were both commercial FM stations before joining the CMU Public Radio network. What is now WCMW was originally WLTO, a country music station. 96.9 WSTD in Standish was originally a satellite-fed oldies station and then moved to a full-service Adult Contemporary music format (with simulcasts of the evening news from WNEM-TV 5) until it went dark in November 1999. The 96.9 frequency was donated to CMU Public Radio and it was on the air with WCMU programming a year later.

At one time, CMU Public Radio was also broadcast on a translator station, W236BU, at 95.1 FM in Traverse City. The translator began operations in 2011, and it was a translator for WCMW-FM Harbor Springs. After the purchase of what now is WCMV-FM on April 30, 2020, the translator was divested, it presently translates WGFN.

WCMU serves the Sault Ste. Marie/Newberry radio market via affiliate station WCMZ, but its signal normally does not reach Newberry. That community was formerly served by Northern Michigan University's similar public radio/NPR/jazz station WNMU-FM via its translator station W216AI, however the translator's license was cancelled on June 17, 2020.

WUCX-FM Bay City simulcasts WCMU-FM generally in the evening hours; that station is owned by CMU, which jointly run WUCX with Delta College.

WCMU-FM, WCML-FM, WCMW-FM, and WUCX-FM all broadcast in HD Radio. Each of the four CMU Public Radio stations broadcasting in HD also offer an HD-2 side channel featuring a 24-7 Classical Music format, branded as "WCMU Classical"; the side channels debuted in January 2012, the original format was formerly a 24-7 NPR news/talk format, which was moved to the main analog/HD-1 signals during a format flip in March 2023.

WCML Transmitter Fire

On February 28, 2024, a fire broke out at the WCML transmitter site, putting WCML-FM 91.7 and its TV sister WCML off the air. The building was a complete loss and the two stations would be off the air for several months, until a temporary setup could be constructed. The fire also had temporarily interrupted a relay to WCMW-FM, which was also off the air but transmits from a separate location. The WCMW signal per the stations website was restored early on February 29, after being out overnight after the fire the day before. On March 1, 2024, WCMU released an initial statement regarding the fire, it was also reported on by 9&10 news. It mentioned a possible power outage causing the automatic standby generator to run. Early on, word of a possible generator malfunction may have caused the fire, but by March 9, WCMU's webpage was updated and the exact cause of the fire was ultimately not able to be determined, any previous speculation of the generator failing was removed from their website.

On July 30, WCML TV and FM both returned to the air at 50% power, with an estimated coverage percentage at around 70% of the normal full power coverage area. WCMU Public Media anticipated a permanent full power restoration of the signals would not occur until sometime in 2025. On November 21, 2025, WCML TV and FM began normal operations at full power once again.
