= WDCQ-TV =

Television station in Bad Axe, Michigan

- Bad Axe–Bay City–Saginaw–Flint, Michigan; United States
- City: Bad Axe, Michigan
- Channels: Digital: 15 (UHF); Virtual: 19
- Branding: Delta College Public Media PBS

Programming
- Affiliations: 19.1: PBS; for others, see § Subchannels

Ownership
- Owner: Delta College
- Sister stations: WUCX-FM

History
- First air date: October 12, 1964 (intellectual unit); December 31, 1986 (Bad Axe transmitter)
- Former call signs: WUCM-TV (1964–1997)
- Former channel numbers: Analog: 35 (UHF, 1986–2009)
- Former affiliations: Educational Independent (1964–1967); NET (1967–1970)
- Call sign meaning: Delta College Quality

Technical information
- Licensing authority: FCC
- Facility ID: 16530
- ERP: 200 kW
- HAAT: 309 m (1,014 ft)
- Transmitter coordinates: 43°32′33″N 83°39′37″W

Links
- Public license information: Public file; LMS
- Website: www.deltapublicmedia.org

WDCQ-TV (channel 19), branded Delta College Public Media, is a PBS member television station licensed to Bad Axe, Michigan, United States, serving East Central Michigan. The station is owned by Delta College, and it is a sister station to NPR member WUCX-FM (90.1 MHz, owned by Central Michigan University (CMU) and jointly operated by Delta College and CMU). The two stations share studios at the Frank N. Andersen Broadcast Center on the Delta College campus on Delta Road in University Center, an unincorporated community in Frankenlust Township in southwestern Bay County; WDCQ-TV's transmitter is located in Quanicassee, in northwestern Tuscola County.

== History ==
The station first signed on the air on October 12, 1964, as WUCM-TV; the "UCM" stood for University Center, Michigan, its city of license. The station was affiliated with National Educational Television (NET) from 1967 to 1970, when the present-day PBS replaced NET. In 1986, WUCM established a satellite station, WUCX-TV (channel 35) in Bad Axe, to better cover Michigan's Thumb area. In 1997, concurrent with a rebranding to "Q-TV", both stations changed their call signs, with WUCM becoming WDCQ-TV, and WUCX becoming WDCP-TV.

The analog channel 19 transmitter was located on a 496-foot (151 m) tower on the campus of Delta College, near the corner of 4-Mile and Delta Roads in Bay County. The analog channel 35 tower was located just south of Ubly.

The WUCX calls are still used today for Delta College's NPR member station, WUCX-FM (90.1). That station is owned by Central Michigan University, and jointly run by Delta College and CMU.

WDCQ is currently the third most-watched PBS station in Michigan, behind WTVS in Detroit and WGVU-TV in Grand Rapids. As of 2021, Thomas Bennett is the general manager of WDCQ and WUCX-FM.

In late August 2020, Delta College re-branded its public broadcasting operations from "Q-TV" to "Delta College Public Media" to better identify its TV and radio stations as associated with Delta College.

== Programming ==
Programming on WDCQ consists of the general primary PBS fare, with some locally produced shows, such as Currently Speaking, a weekly, live current events discussion program hosted by Andy Rapp, who's been a personality at WDCQ since the early 1970s, when he hosted a daily discussion program, Day by Day, which ran on the old WUCM into the 1980s.

Starting in 2005, WDCQ-TV began to produce local documentaries which looked at aspects of local history in the Great Lakes Bay Region and surrounding areas. These documentaries received many state and national awards including four Michigan Association of Broadcasters "Excellence in Broadcasting" Awards, numerous "Telly" awards among others. Documentaries produced include:

- Ag 2.0: Agriculture - Changes, Challenges & Trends
- BREACHED! The Tittabawassee River Disaster
- Breaking New Ground: Women of the Saginaw Valley
- Coal in the Valley: Mid-Michigan Mining History
- Flint: The 19th Century - The Crossroads of Michigan
- Flint: The 20th Century - The Vehicle City Rises
- The Korean War: Voices from the 38th Parallel
- Margin of Victory - Saginaw Valley's Role in Winning World War II
- More Than a Movie - The US-23 Drive-in Experience
- Restored to Glory - Classic Automobiles, Collectors & Their Stories
- Sailing Into the Past: Travels Aboard El Galeón & The Tall Ship Celebration
- Sawdust & Shanty Boys - Logging the Saginaw Valley White Pine
- Settling In: Immigrants & Cultures That Built Mid-Michigan
- Taking Flight: The History of Aviation in the Great Lakes Bay Region
- Tracks Through Time - Michigan Railroads - History & Impact
- Vanishing Voices of World War Two
- Vietnam Voices: Mid-Michigan Remembers the Vietnam War

== Technical information ==
=== Subchannels ===
The station's signal is multiplexed:

Subchannels of WDCQ-TV
Subchannel	Res.	Short name	Programming
19.1	720p	PBS	PBS
19.2	480i	WORLD	World Channel
19.3	480i	CREATE	Create (4:3)
19.4	480i	KIDS	PBS Kids (4:3)
19.5	480i	MLC	Michigan Learning Channel (4:3)

=== Analog-to-digital conversion ===
With the impending end of analog broadcasting in the United States, Delta College decided to use one digital station to cover its entire coverage area. Since it was widely believed that digital signals would travel further than analog signals, Delta College anticipated this would make up for the main WDCQ signal's shortfall on the Thumb. When each analog station was assigned a digital channel, WDCQ-TV in University Center was assigned channel 18 while WDCP-TV in Bad Axe was assigned channel 15 for digital. For practicality and monetary reasons, school officials opted to activate only channel 15, from a location that was close enough to the Tri-Cities to provide city-grade coverage to the area. Accordingly, on November 28, 2003, the two stations switched callsigns, with channel 19 becoming WDCP-TV, and channel 35 becoming WDCQ-TV.

WDCQ-TV ended regular programming on its analog signal, over UHF channel 35, on June 12, 2009, the official date on which full-power television stations in the United States transitioned from analog to digital broadcasts under federal mandate. The station's digital signal remained on its pre-transition UHF channel 15, using virtual channel 19—reflecting the analog channel position of WDCP. Even though FCC regulations would usually mandate that WDCQ use "35" as its virtual channel, Delta College sought and received permission to use "19" instead. This is because most of its viewers live in the Flint–Tri-Cities area and had watched the station on channel 19 for almost half a century. However, WDCQ-TV is on channel 35 for DirecTV customers in its market.
