= WKAR-FM =

- East Lansing, Michigan; United States
- Broadcast area: Lansing–East Lansing metropolitan area
- Frequency: 90.5 MHz (HD Radio)
- Branding: NPR WKAR

Programming
- Format: Public radio; classical music; news and talk
- Subchannels: HD2: WKAR (AM) simulcast
- Affiliations: National Public Radio; Public Radio Exchange; American Public Media; Classical 24; BBC World Service; Emergency Alert System

Ownership
- Owner: Michigan State University
- Sister stations: WKAR-TV, WKAR (AM)

History
- First air date: October 4, 1948; 77 years ago
- Call sign meaning: call letters are shared with WKAR (AM) (WKAR's call letters were assigned randomly in 1922)

Technical information
- Licensing authority: FCC
- Facility ID: 41683
- Class: B
- ERP: 85,000 watts
- HAAT: 269.3 meters (884 ft)
- Transmitter coordinates: 42°42′7″N 84°24′48″W
- Translator: HD2: 102.3 W272EM (East Lansing)

Links
- Public license information: Public file; LMS
- Webcast: Listen Live
- Website: wkar.org

WKAR-FM (90.5 MHz) is a non-commercial public radio station in East Lansing, Michigan. It is owned by Michigan State University, along with sister stations WKAR (870 AM) and WKAR-TV (channel 23). They are owned by Michigan State University, with studios in the Communication Arts and Sciences Building, at Wilson and Red Cedar Roads on the MSU campus.

WKAR-FM has an effective radiated power (ERP) of 85,000 watts, grandfathered as a "Superpower" FM station. It can be heard as far east as Flint and the Detroit suburbs, and as far west as Grand Rapids and Kalamazoo. The transmitter tower is off Dobie Road in Okemos, near the Red Cedar River.

== Programming ==
On weekdays, WKAR-FM airs classical music in middays and evenings, with news and talk shows heard at other times, including National Public Radio programs Morning Edition, All Things Considered and Fresh Air. On weekends, classical music is heard in middays and overnight, with folk music in the evening. Weekend NPR shows include This Old House Radio Hour, Wait Wait... Don't Tell Me!, This American Life, Code Switch and Hidden Brain. Overnight, WKAR-FM carries Classical 24.

Michigan news updates and NPR News are heard at the beginning of most hours. While WKAR-FM concentrates on classical music, WKAR AM has an all news and talk schedule. Morning Edition and All Things Considered are heard on both stations. WKAR AM programming is also carried on WKAR-FM's HD Radio digital subchannel.

WKAR-FM is the primary Emergency Alert System (EAS) station for the state of Michigan, relaying emergency messages from the Michigan State Police to all media outlets in Michigan. It hosts statewide tests twice a year. WKAR-FM is also the secondary EAS station for Lansing and the South Central Michigan region (WFMK is the primary station for the region).

Former logo

== History ==
After World War II, what was then Michigan State College decided to add an FM station to supplement WKAR (870 AM). WKAR-FM signed on the air on October 4, 1948. It was the Lansing area's first FM station, although few people owned radios that could receive FM signals then.

Like most FM stations of the time, it simulcast its AM sister during its sunrise to sunset broadcast hours. When the AM station had to sign off at sunset to protect WWL in New Orleans, WKAR-FM would then carry its own signature programming which included classical music and other arts-related programs.

The two stations split their broadcasting schedules on March 1, 1965. The FM station primarily aired fine arts programming, while the AM station concentrated on news and information. The WKAR stations became a founding member station of NPR in 1971, and carried the network's inaugural broadcast of All Things Considered on May 3, 1971.

WKAR-FM is a "Superpower Grandfathered" Class B FM station, providing a signal 7.6 dB stronger than would be granted today under current U.S. Federal Communications Commission (FCC) rules. While most stations in this section of Michigan are limited to 50,000 watts, WKAR-FM is powered at 85,000 watts. WKAR-FM went on the air before the FCC rules on maximum power were established.

In January 2013, WKAR-AM-FM launched the daily news/arts radio magazine Current State, an hour-long program of interviews and produced reports devoted to Mid-Michigan and statewide politics, government, business, education, environment, science, technology, health, medicine and the arts. The program was broadcast Monday through Friday at 9 am and 6 pm on 90.5 FM and weekdays at noon on AM 870. It was discontinued several years later.

== HD programming ==
WKAR-FM is licensed by the FCC to broadcast using HD Radio (hybrid) technology. Until 2017, its HD signal broadcast on three streams.

HD1 is a simulcast of the analog FM signal's classical music and NPR format.

HD2 is a simulcast of WKAR (870 AM), continuing from local sunset to sunrise when the AM station is not broadcasting. It is also simulcast on a low-powered translator at 102.3 FM giving most of the Lansing area access to a locally focused NPR news and talk station. It originally was a simulcast of the Classical 24 music channel. That service airs on the main signal from 7 pm to 5 am.

HD3 was a simulcast of WKAR AM; it was also simulcast on a low-powered translator at 105.1 FM. On June 30, 2017, WKAR-FM ended its HD3 subchannel. The Classical 24 stream is available on the WKAR website, along with streams of the Lansing area's radio reading service as well as a jazz channel. Currently, the HD2 subchannel simulcasts WKAR 870 AM.
