= WKAR (AM) =

- East Lansing, Michigan; United States
- Broadcast area: Lansing-East Lansing metropolitan area
- Frequency: 870 kHz
- Branding: WKAR NewsTalk

Programming
- Language: English
- Format: Public radio; news/talk
- Affiliations: National Public Radio; American Public Media; Public Radio Exchange; BBC World Service

Ownership
- Owner: Michigan State University
- Sister stations: WKAR-TV, WKAR-FM

History
- First air date: August 18, 1922; 104 years ago (Experimental 8YG 1920-1922)
- Former frequencies: 833 kHz (1922–1923); 1070 kHz (1923–1925); 1050 kHz (1925–1927); 1080 kHz (1927–1928); 1040 kHz (1928–1936); 850 kHz (1936–1941)

Technical information
- Licensing authority: FCC
- Facility ID: 41684
- Class: D
- Power: 10,000 watts day
- Transmitter coordinates: 42°42′19″N 84°28′30″W
- Translators: 102.3 W272EM (East Lansing, relays WKAR-FM HD2)
- Repeater: 90.5 WKAR-FM HD2 (East Lansing))

Links
- Public license information: Public file; LMS
- Webcast: Listen live
- Website: www.wkar.org

WKAR (870 kHz) is a non-commercial public AM radio station, licensed to the trustees of Michigan State University (MSU) at East Lansing, Michigan. It is part of MSU's Broadcasting Services Division, along with WKAR-FM and WKAR-TV. The station's studios and offices are in the Communication Arts and Sciences Building, at the southeast corner of Wilson and Red Cedar Roads on the MSU campus.

WKAR is a Class D daytimer station. It is powered at 10,000 watts by day, using a directional antenna with a two-tower array. Its signal reaches as far east as Ann Arbor, as far north as Saginaw and as far west as Grand Rapids. Because 870 AM is a clear channel frequency reserved for Class A station WWL New Orleans, WKAR must go off the air at night to avoid interference.

== Programming ==
The majority of WKAR's schedule consists of NPR national programming with the BBC World Service heard overnight. WKAR provides local news inserts between shows. Some NPR shows heard on WKAR include Morning Edition, All Things Considered, 1A, Here and Now and Fresh Air with Terry Gross. WKAR also features two hours of Spanish language news and talk on weekday afternoons. On weekends, the schedule includes Wait, Wait, Don't Tell Me, The Splendid Table, Latino USA, Travel with Rick Steves, It's Been A Minute, Code Switch and weekly Spanish language shows Edición Semanaria and Que Onda Michigan hosted by Michelle Jokisch Polo.

WKAR 870 and 102.3 offers an all news-and-talk schedule, while sister station WKAR-FM 90.5 plays classical music during middays and at night. Some shows, such as Morning Edition and All Things Considered, are heard on both stations.

During the winter months, the AM station generally signs off between 5 pm and 6 pm, returning to the air at 8 am. During the summer months, it generally signs off at 8 pm and returns to the air at 6 am.

== History ==
=== 8YG ===
WKAR, first licensed on August 18, 1922, is one of the oldest stations in Michigan. Its establishment was an outgrowth of earlier experimental broadcasts at the then-Michigan Agricultural College. In 1920 the college was issued a "Technical and Training School" license for radio station 8YG. That year Professor Arthur R. Sawyer, head of the School of Electrical Engineering, made a proposal for establishing a broadcast service distributing information of interest to local farmers. At the time, the school was unable to procure the funding needed for the idea. 8YG was primarily used for training purposes, and also participated as a relay station, forwarding messages sent between amateur stations.

The station was also occasionally used for general broadcasts, including a reported January 24, 1922, play-by-play broadcast of a basketball game by a college team against one at Mount Pleasant Normal School (now Central Michigan University). Later in 1922, several engineering students at MAC broadcast a number of off-color songs in hopes of entertaining students in Wells Hall, then a major dorm. They used the fictional call sign WARDE. The following day, they discovered that by accident, their broadcast had traveled 15 mi (24 km) from East Lansing. The following May 13 a Founders Day speech by President Friday was broadcast for reception by scattered alumni clubs.

=== WKAR ===
The Department of Commerce, which regulated radio at this time, eventually adopted a regulation requiring that stations making broadcasts intended for the general public needed to be formally licensed as broadcasting stations. On August 18, 1922, the college was issued its first broadcasting license, for operation on the standard "entertainment" wavelength of 360 meters (833 kHz). The call sign WKAR was randomly assigned from a sequential list of available call letters. WKAR was the second broadcasting station licensed in the Lansing area, and is the oldest surviving one. It was one of a number of AM stations established by universities (often land-grant institutions) in the early days of radio.

The station was reassigned to multiple transmitting frequencies in its early years, moving to 1070 kHz in 1923, 1050 kHz in early 1925, and 1080 kHz in late 1927. On November 11, 1928, it was assigned to daytime-only operation on 1040 kHz, as part of the Federal Radio Commission's implementation of General Order 40. In 1936 it was transferred to 850 kHz, and moved to its current frequency, 870 kHz, in March 1941, as part of the major band shift enacted by the North American Regional Broadcasting Agreement. Between 1939 and 1941 WKAR boosted power from 1,000 to 5,000 watts. The station expanded to its current 10,000 watts in the late 1960s.

The WKAR stations are charter members of NPR. They were among the 90 stations that carried the initial broadcast of All Things Considered on May 3, 1971.

Former logo

Before 2010, Michigan Radio flagship WUOM in Ann Arbor was the only source of 24-hour NPR news programming for Lansing; its signal easily covers most of the Lansing area. That year WKAR's programming began to be simulcast on a WKAR-FM HD Radio digital subchannel, originally its HD2 subchannel, before moving to the HD3 channel in 2012. (WKAR 870 programming has since returned to the HD-2 subchannel.)

WKAR began to be relayed by a low-powered FM translator, originally at FM 94.5, allowing conventional radio listeners to hear its programming in one form or another 24 hours a day. The translator moved to FM 105.1 in March 2018. The FM translator station made another move, this time to 102.3 MHz, on November 10, 2021.

In July 2025, WKAR Public Media laid off nine employees, as a result of "federal budget challenges".
