= WKAR-TV =

Television station in East Lansing, Michigan

- East Lansing–Lansing–; Jackson, Michigan; United States
- City: East Lansing, Michigan
- Channels: Digital: 33 (UHF); Virtual: 23
- Branding: PBS WKAR

Programming
- Affiliations: 23.1: PBS; for others, see § Subchannels

Ownership
- Owner: Michigan State University; (Board of Trustees, Michigan State University)
- Sister stations: WKAR, WKAR-FM

History
- First air date: January 15, 1954 (Note: The channel and call sign history goes as follows: WKAR-TV 60 (January 15, 1954–June 28, 1958); WMSB 10 (March 15, 1959–September 10, 1972); WKAR-TV 23 (since September 10, 1972).)
- Former call signs: WKAR-TV (1954–1958); WMSB (1959–1972 (Note: Shared operation with WILX-TV.))
- Former channel numbers: Analog: 60 (UHF, 1954–1958), 10 (VHF, 1959–1972), 23 (UHF, 1972–2009); Digital: 55 (UHF, 2004–2009), 40 (UHF, 2009–2018)
- Former affiliations: NET (1954–1970)
- Call sign meaning: taken from WKAR radio

Technical information
- Licensing authority: FCC
- Facility ID: 6104
- ERP: 376 kW
- HAAT: 296 m (971 ft)
- Transmitter coordinates: 42°42′6.9″N 84°24′47.8″W

Links
- Public license information: Public file; LMS
- Website: tv.wkar.org

WKAR-TV (channel 23) is a PBS member television station licensed to East Lansing, Michigan, United States, serving central southern Michigan. The station is owned by Michigan State University (MSU) and operated as part of WKAR Public Media, along with NPR members WKAR (870 AM) and WKAR-FM (90.5). The three stations share studios in the Communication Arts and Sciences Building at the southeast corner of Wilson and Red Cedar Roads on the MSU campus in East Lansing. WKAR-TV's transmitter is located off Dobie Road near Kinawa Drive in Meridian Charter Township between East Lansing and Williamston.

WKAR-TV was the third educational TV station established in the United States and is the second-oldest still in operation, though its license history is not continuous. The station first broadcast on UHF channel 60 from January 1954 to June 1958, broadcasting from studios in a complex of converted Quonset huts on the campus of what was then Michigan State College in East Lansing. The vast majority of its programming was live and included educational programs, courses for Lansing city schools, and occasional sports telecasts. Its performance as an educational outlet was severely limited by the troubles of early UHF television, particularly small coverage areas and the inability of many sets to receive UHF channels without a converter. As channel 60 was going on the air, VHF channel 10 was assigned to Onondaga, 20 miles (32 km) south of Lansing. Michigan State filed an application opposite four commercial bidders. It then teamed with Television Corporation of Michigan, a group with close ties to Lansing commercial radio station WILS, to propose a share-time operation. Believed to be the first of its kind, it called for Michigan State to air educational programming 38 hours a week and lease the transmitter facility for a commercial operation that would air for the balance of the time. The proposal met with stiff opposition, even after the Federal Communications Commission granted a construction permit. WKAR-TV ceased broadcasting on channel 60 in June 1958, and Michigan State—by now a university—resumed broadcasting as WMSB, sharing time with the commercial station WILX-TV, on March 15, 1959. The expanded coverage area increased the visibility and use of MSU's educational programs for schools.

Many of the circumstances that led to the WMSB–WILX-TV relationship had changed by the late 1960s, including new leadership at MSU; increased programming availability for public television; and the All-Channel Receiver Act, which required television sets built after 1964 to include UHF capability. In 1970, MSU filed for the educational channel 23 in East Lansing, which was built and began broadcasting once more as WKAR-TV on September 6, 1972. This ended the 13-year sharing of channel 10, whose facilities were sold to WILX-TV, and more than doubled the station's operating hours per week. Shortly before the move, the station debuted Off the Record, a long-running Michigan political program still in production today. In 1981, WKAR-TV moved out of the Quonset huts after 27 years and into purpose-built studios in the new Communication Arts Building.

WKAR-TV began broadcasting a digital signal in 2004 and debuted multiple subchannels of programming in 2007. In 2018, it was the first public TV station in the U.S. to be authorized to build an ATSC 3.0 experimental station. In addition to PBS and other public TV programs, the station continues to produce programs of local and state interest.

== History ==
=== The channel 60 years ===
On April 14, 1952, the Federal Communications Commission (FCC) moved to end a years-long freeze on the assignment of new TV stations. It allocated the new ultra high frequency (UHF) band to television and set aside hundreds of very high frequency (VHF) and UHF channels nationally to education. East Lansing was assigned channel 60, though it was not one of the seven educational channels allotted throughout the state. Michigan State College had been fully equipped to produce television programs since 1950 and only lacked a transmitter. When the freeze was lifted, Michigan State officials immediately announced their intention to seek channel 60. The first application made its way to the FCC in June, but it had to be refiled because the college had specified Lansing instead of East Lansing. The commission granted the construction permit on October 15, 1952; college officials began planning to build a transmitter site at Okemos to connect with the existing television studio. The Ford Foundation provided $100,000 to purchase the transmitter. During this time, the college continued to provide its equipment for a variety of production tasks, including a joint telecast of election returns in 1952 with WJIM-TV (channel 6) and the Lansing State Journal newspaper which utilized Michigan State–owned cameras and control equipment.

The state board of agriculture approved a contract for the construction of the transmitter facility in July 1953. While the 1,034-foot (315 m) tower was completed and the antenna raised to the top, college officials announced their plans for WKAR-TV to build on the Michigan State television operation, which had produced more than 750 programs since 1951, including the relocation of the studios from the electrical engineering building into a series of Quonset huts along Kalamazoo Street on the campus and the acquisition of mobile units for outside broadcasting. One program, Curtain Going Up, was a television adaptation of the popular WKAR radio program by the same name, which had been on the air for 18 years. Also slated were nightly telecourses in drivers' education and political science.

WKAR-TV began broadcasting on January 15, 1954. The first day featured several activities and events on the campus, including a luncheon at which FCC commissioner John C. Doerfer spoke, as well as a dedication broadcast in the evening with speeches from Governor G. Mennen Williams and Michigan State president John A. Hannah. WKAR-TV was the third noncommercial educational TV station in the United States, following KUHT in Houston and KTHE in Los Angeles, which soon folded. Live shows predominated, representing as much as 80 percent of WKAR-TV's program output. The station launched four months before the Ann Arbor–based Educational Television and Radio Center initiated regular program service to the nation's then-six educational stations on May 16. Despite operating out of Quonset huts that were noisy when it rained, the studio facility—once a cafeteria for postwar student housing—was seen as among the best. Robert Page recalled that others called them "the fat cats of educational TV".

In 1957, the National Collegiate Athletic Association (NCAA) revised restrictions on college football telecasts, at the behest of several state legislatures, to permit the telecast of home games on a noncommercial basis by "the home college's institutionally owned educational television station", with WKAR-TV as a potential beneficiary. The station took advantage and carried a game between the Notre Dame and Michigan State from Spartan Stadium on November 9 of that year. That same year, WKAR-TV began airing educational television programs for seven Lansing elementary schools, where fifth-graders received art, science, and music lessons.

=== Michigan State on channel 10 ===
At the same time that WKAR-TV was getting going, a proceeding was beginning to allocate a new VHF television channel to areas south of Lansing. In January 1954, the FCC approved the addition of channel 10 as a commercial service to Onondaga, Michigan. Michigan State College unsuccessfully petitioned for the channel to be assigned as a noncommercial service. By June 1954, four commercial applicants—Triad Television, Jackson Broadcasting and Telecasting, Booth Radio and Television Stations, and Television Corporation of Michigan (TCM)—had filed for channel 10. In July, MSC joined them and filed a proposal to build channel 10 on a commercial basis.

In pursuing channel 10, Michigan State College officials fretted about their status on an increasingly second-class UHF band. The college told the FCC that it feared being "in immediate danger of being the only UHF island in a sea of VHF service". Michigan State on channel 60 was finding that set owners were not converting to view UHF stations at the rate they had hoped, crimping the effectiveness of its station. In 1955, Armand L. Hunter, the director of educational television at Michigan State College, noted that the existing operation of channel 60 did not justify the $300,000 annual expense to operate it.

Television Corporation of Michigan, one of the four applicants and a related company to Lansing radio station WILS, made a proposal to Michigan State, and the companies revised their applications in September 1954. Under the new proposal, the college would build the facility and lease it to Television Corporation of Michigan. The two groups, each with separate licenses, would broadcast at different times each day; the Michigan State station would be on air 38 hours a week, only slightly less than the 40 hours WKAR-TV was operating. Like Michigan State, WILS was disappointed in its UHF station; it was in the process of selling channel 54. The college's entrance into the channel 10 contest led to some concern by state legislators that Michigan State was entering into competition with private broadcasters; college officials stated that the station would not be built with tax dollars and that the university would recoup its investment in the form of lease payments to Television Corporation of Michigan.

FCC hearings in the long-running case concluded in October 1956. Hearing examiner Annie Neal Huntting handed down her initial decision on March 7, 1957. It favored the joint bid of Michigan State University (MSU) (Note: Michigan State College was renamed Michigan State University (MSU) by a bill signed into law on April 21, 1955, and effective that July 1.) and Television Corporation of Michigan. The losing applicants mounted nearly two years of appeals to the FCC and Michigan courts. The matter was heard by the commission in April 1958; Booth, Triad, and Jackson Broadcasting and Telecasting argued the proposed station would feature a "mish-mash" of cultural and commercial programs, citing the scheduling of programming on world philosophy next to The Lone Ranger.

In May 1958, the FCC denied the appeals and awarded a tentative construction permit to Michigan State University for the construction of the channel 10 facility. With this tentative approval in hand, MSU shut down WKAR-TV on channel 60 the next month, with president John A. Hannah announcing the university would not return to the air until channel 10 was completed. MSU received formal FCC approval for channel 10 after a split commission decision on September 3. The university signaled it would be able to provide educational television programs in a much wider area from channel 10 than it had from channel 60. The companies initially planned to telecast under the call letters they had used on the UHF band—WILS-TV and WKAR-TV—but the FCC assigned them the call signs WFTV and WMSB, respectively. The WFTV designation was quickly changed to WILX-TV.

The university swung into the process of taking bids for construction. Its progress was soon halted by continued appeals from the losers, this time in Michigan courts. Acting on a petition from the Jackson Broadcasting and Telecasting Corporation, a circuit judge in Jackson enjoined MSU from awarding construction contracts in late October. The Jackson firm's petition contended that the MSU plan to issue revenue bonds to finance construction and pay them back with the proceeds from the lease to Television Corporation of Michigan violated the Michigan state constitution and a condition on legislative appropriations to the university. MSU emerged victorious when the circuit judge lifted his temporary restraining order, and the FCC denied last appeals made by Jackson Broadcasting and Telecasting. During construction, on January 9, 1959, a 28-year-old tower worker from Decatur, Illinois, fell 450 feet (140 m) to his death when rigging gave way.

Channel 10 debuted on March 15, 1959. WMSB was the first station to greet viewers with a dedication program from its East Lansing studios, but high winds caused the microwave link to be unreliable and the picture to be described as "jumpy" by the Jackson Citizen Patriot. Later that afternoon, after a 90-minute outage when wind knocked down a power line, WILX-TV made its debut from its studio in Jackson.

Much of WMSB's programming in this era continued to be produced for the benefit of schools. By 1960, Classroom 10 had expanded beyond Lansing and to additional subjects, and with the exception of Spanish and French courses, much of it remained live. The school system in Battle Creek became a formal member of Classroom 10 in 1961, paying 60 cents per student to defray the costs of the educational broadcasts. By the 1965–1966 school year, more than 400,000 students in some 100 school districts in channel 10's wide coverage area watched Classroom 10 material. The programs produced in East Lansing by WMSB were distributed by Michigan Classroom Television, an independent entity from MSU, for use in areas outside Mid-Michigan, including Saginaw, Marquette, and Grand Rapids.

The first-of-its-kind combination of a commercial and educational station on the same channel was an uneasy, but stable, marriage. Colby Lewis, who served as station manager from 1964 to 1968, recalled that the university "did manage to keep the lights on". The original broadcasting schedule between the stations was modified in 1965 to permit WILX-TV to air The Huntley-Brinkley Report while granting WMSB additional time on Sundays and Mondays; previously, Huntley-Brinkley aired during WMSB's operating hours with the commercials removed. After MSU received a video tape recorder in 1960, it was able to become less reliant on live programming to fill out its broadcast day.

=== Move to channel 23 ===
In 1968, Michigan State University and WMSB each experienced a change in leadership. Robert Page became the university station's new manager shortly before Clifton R. Wharton Jr. was named MSU's new president. By that time, circumstances in public broadcasting and UHF reception had changed. There was more programming available to public TV stations in the wake of the Public Broadcasting Act of 1967, while the All-Channel Receiver Act meant that all new TV sets could receive UHF stations. WMSB could not reach a family audience since WILX controlled the evening hours under the share-time arrangement. WMSB's early evening window, from 6 to 7:30 p.m., attracted few viewers against newscasts on competing stations. With this in mind, Page began to lobby Wharton and the MSU administration to return WMSB to full-time status. The university filed an application for channel 23 in East Lansing in November 1970, which the FCC approved in 1971 after the university received a federal grant. MSU agreed to sell the channel 10 physical plant at Onondaga to Television Corporation of Michigan for $1.7 million, funding the university would use for capital improvements to its television facilities. On September 10, 1972, the special 23 This Way was simulcast as the last program of WMSB and the first program of the revived WKAR-TV.

Shortly before the move to channel 23, Michigan State debuted a new public affairs program, which consisted of a panel discussion of the week's events and an interview with a newsmaker. Off the Record, hosted by Tim Skubick, became a station fixture and highly influential in Michigan politics, with Skubick as its sole host in its more than 50 years on the air. WKAR began another tradition in 1978 when it hosted its first televised auction; the annual auction brought in $6 million for the station over 30 editions until it was discontinued following the 2007 auction due to declining donations and the presence of other community fundraiser auctions. In the 1970s, the station also debuted programs serving the region's Hispanic and Black communities with TeleRevista and Perspectives in Black, the latter of which counted Coretta Scott King and Andrew Young among its guests.

The WKAR-FM and TV transmitter facility near Okemos suffered a major fire on August 21, 1978. Page estimated that the stations would be out of service for six to ten weeks, though Lansing and East Lansing cable viewers continued to receive public broadcasting by a direct feed from the studio. With channel 23 off the air, key programs such as Sesame Street, Masterpiece Theatre, and Michigan State football highlights aired on commercial station WJIM-TV (channel 6) until it returned to the air on October 20. No cause was ever determined for the fire, though arson and negligence were discarded by investigators.

From the 1970s to the 1980s, Michigan State University's annual support dropped as a percentage of WKAR-TV's budget. In 1973–1974, the university contributed 91 percent of the station's budget; this had nearly completely inverted by 1985–1986, when 12 percent of WKAR-TV was funded by the university, though MSU covered other non-financial expenses. A 1980 budget crisis at MSU curtailed much of the station's local program production, though Off the Record and several other shows remained on channel 23's schedule. Throughout the 1980s, the station aired and distributed the outdoors show Michigan Outdoors, hosted by Fred Trost. It ceased airing in 1992 after Trost was forced into personal bankruptcy after a jury determined he had defamed a maker of deer scents.

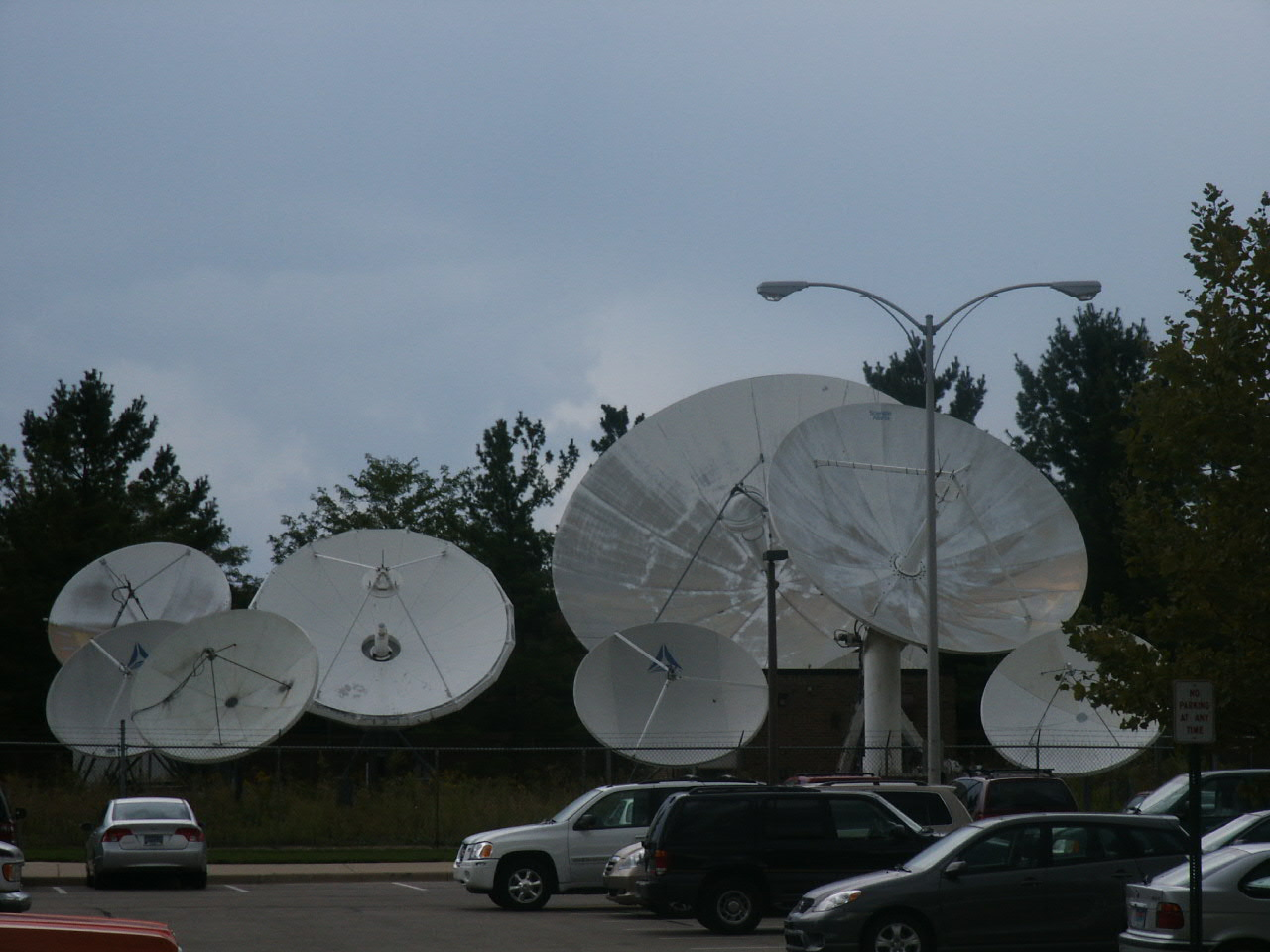
Satellite dishes near the Communication Arts and Sciences Building

Between October and November 1981, WKAR-TV moved into the new Communication Arts Building; the work involved moving a 14,000-pound (6,400 kg) satellite dish to the new site. The station had been among the last tenants of a Quonset hut on campus; after World War II, there were as many as 104, though only 13 remained by early 1982.

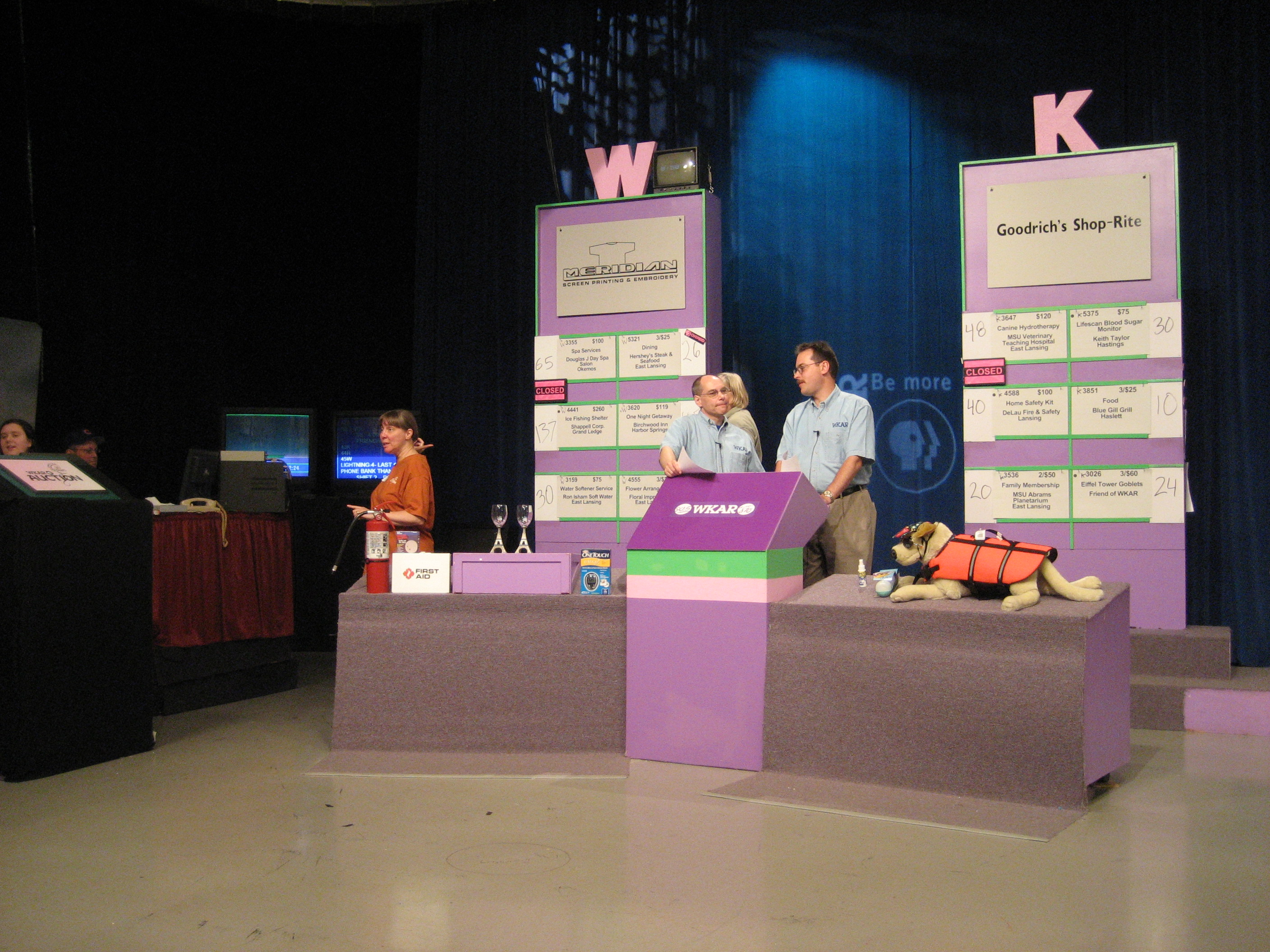
The 2007 WKAR-TV auction (shown above) was the 30th and final such fundraiser for the station.

Another long-running WKAR-TV local production debuted in 1989: QuizBusters, a quiz competition for high school students. The best-performing teams among larger and smaller schools each year received one-year scholarships to attend MSU. The 2017–2018 season was the last for the show.

=== The digital era ===
On January 15, 2004—the 50th anniversary of WKAR-TV, timed to coincide with the moment its transmitter turned on the first day on air—the station began broadcasting a digital signal on channel 55. In 2007, the station began offering four subchannels on its digital signal, among them Create and World, which subsumed the previously cable-only KAR2 and KAR3 services. In the 2000s, the station produced BackStage Pass, a music showcase that became a nationally distributed program.

WKAR-TV shut down its analog signal, over UHF channel 23, on January 13, 2009. The early shutdown enabled the station to replace the old analog transmitter with a digital transmitter for use on channel 40, its post-transition channel, instead of channel 55. The tower in Okemos, which had stood since the construction of the original WKAR-TV, was replaced in 2011. The TV station began 24-hour digital broadcasting in 2012 and was repacked to channel 33 in 2018.

On January 11, 2016, WKAR-TV announced that it would partner with WTVS in Detroit to launch a 24-hour children's television service to be carried by both stations, which was replaced by the new PBS Kids channel in 2017.

WKAR was the first public broadcasting station in the U.S. to receive authorization for an experimental ATSC 3.0 (NextGen TV) transmitter in 2018. The station received a Department of Education grant in 2022 to provide K-12 educational datacasting to underserved families utilizing the ATSC 3.0 signal.

== Funding ==
WKAR-TV had a total revenue of $5.6 million in fiscal year 2023. Michigan State University provided $1.775 million in appropriations to fund the TV station. More than 10,300 members contributed $1.58 million, plus $354,000 from 14 major donors. The Corporation for Public Broadcasting provided a Community Service Grant of $1.08 million.

== Local programming ==
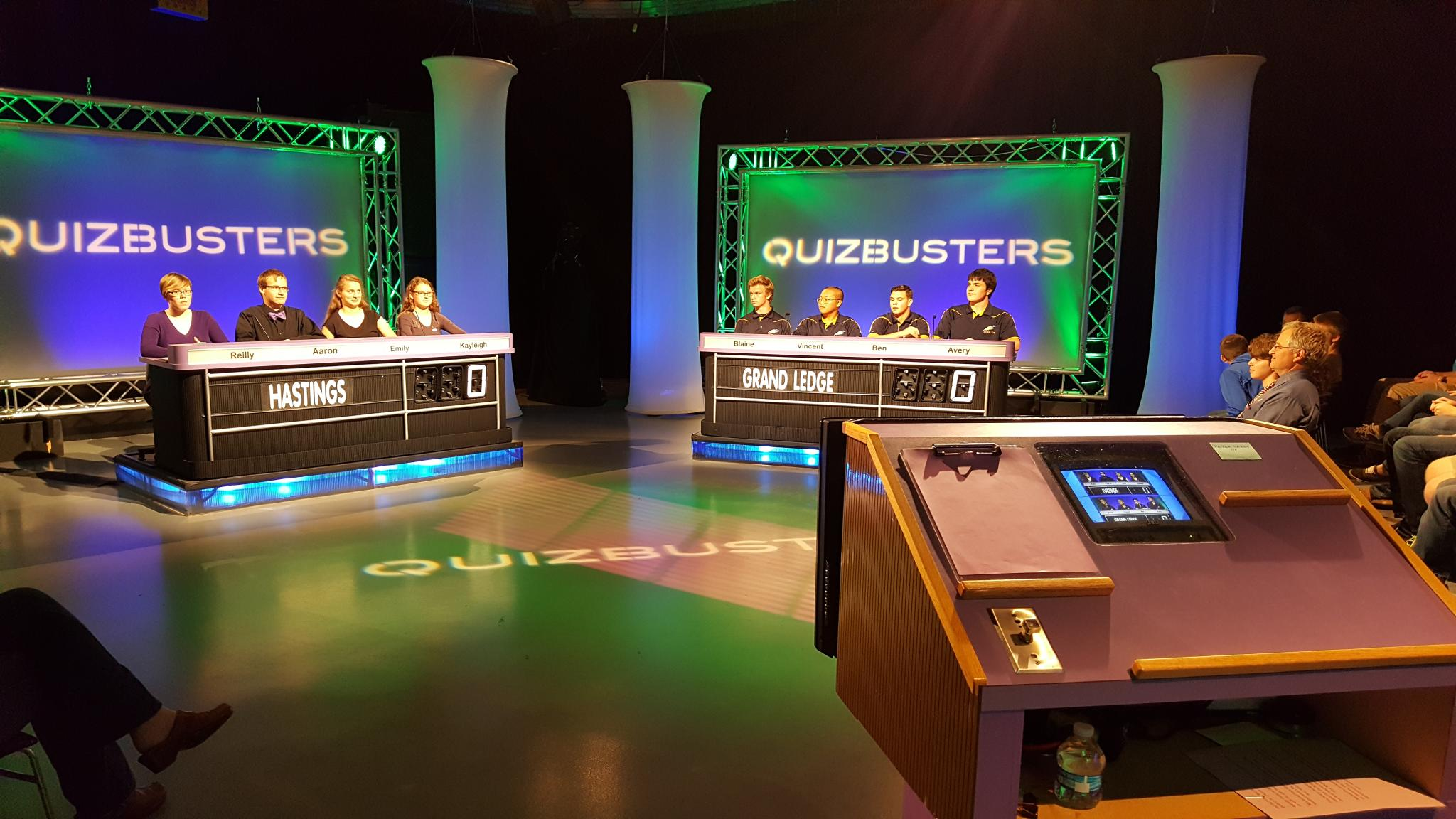
On the set of QuizBusters in 2016

In addition to the long-running Off the Record and BackStage Pass, WKAR-TV distributes other state government–related programs such as the Governor of Michigan's State of the State address and an annual program, Evening with the Governor. For children, the station produces Curious Crew, a science program that debuted in 2014 and the next year achieved distribution on other public TV stations in Michigan.

== Subchannels ==
WKAR-TV's transmitter is located off Dobie Road near Kinawa Drive in Meridian Charter Township between East Lansing and Williamston. The station's signal is multiplexed:

Subchannels of WKAR-TV
Subchannel	Res.	Short name	Programming
23.1	1080i	WKARHD	PBS
23.2	480i	WKARWLD	World
23.3	480i	WKARCRT	Create
23.4	480i	WKARKID	PBS Kids
23.5	480i	WKARMLC	Michigan Learning Channel
