= Delta College (Michigan) =

Community college in University Center, Michigan, US

Coordinates: 43°33′32.3″N 83°59′10.1″W

- Type: Public community college
- Established: 1961; 65 years ago
- Endowment: $37.5 million (2025)
- President: Michelle Allmendinger
- Faculty: 212
- Administrative staff: 559
- Students: ~9,000
- Location: University Center, Michigan, U.S.
- Campus: 640 acres
- Colors: Evergreen and white
- Mascot: Duck
- Website: www.delta.edu

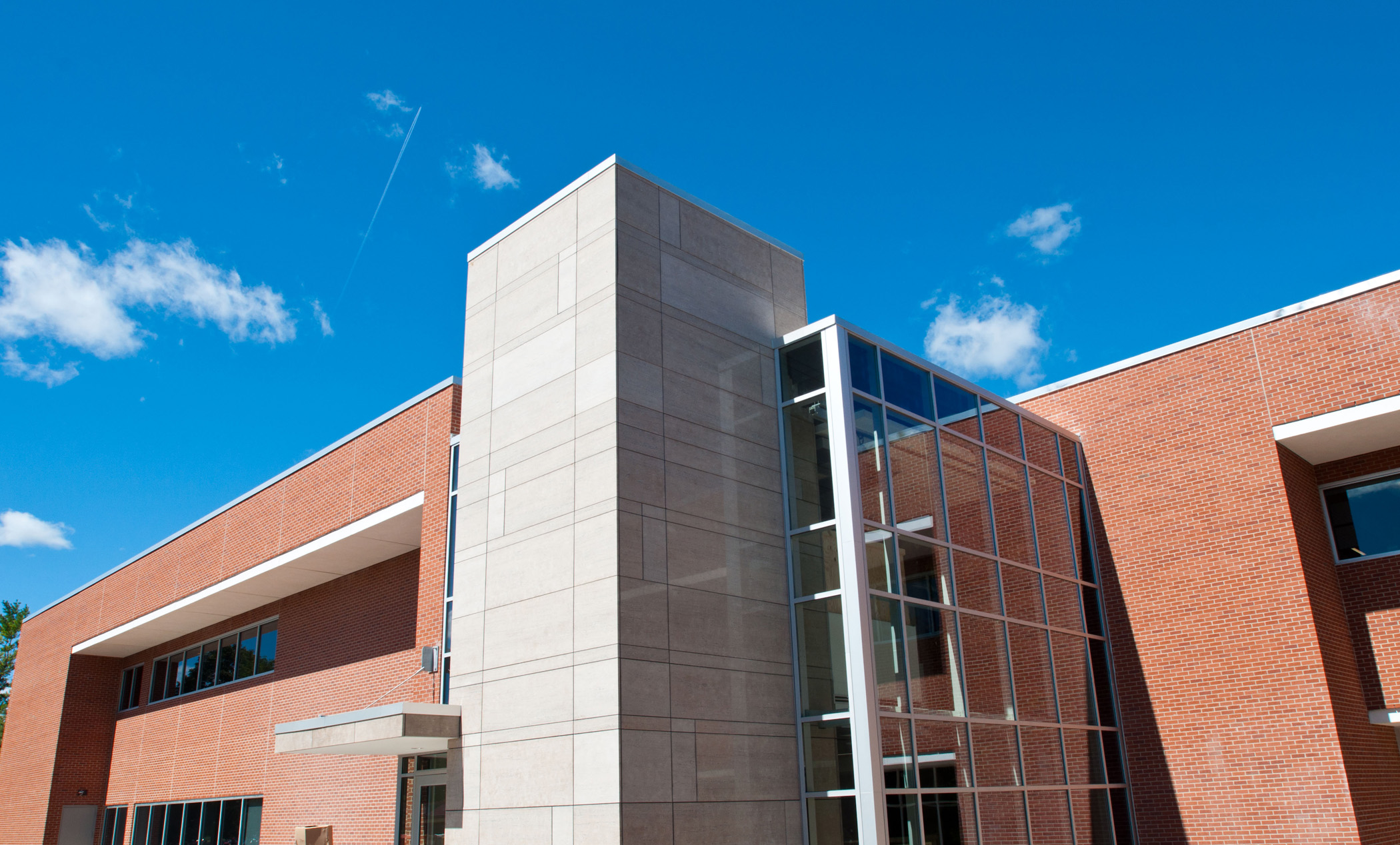
Delta College Health Professions Building

Delta College is a public community college in University Center, Michigan, United States.

== History ==
Delta College's district had its beginning in 1955, consisting of Saginaw, Midland, and Bay counties. In 1957, the voters of these counties approved the construction of the college, and it opened for classes in 1961. Delta College replaced Bay City Junior College, established in 1922, because the junior college could no longer support the growing enrollment.

In 1967, the college opened two residence halls on the campus. Occupancy of the dorms peaked in 1980 at 178 students but by 1990, that number was down to eighty-five. The following year, one of the halls was closed, and the second followed closed in 1993.

== Governance ==
Delta College's district consists of Saginaw, Midland and Bay counties. The board of trustees is made up of nine trustees, three from each county.

== Downtown centers ==
Delta College has remote campuses in each of its three neighboring counties: Delta College Planetarium in downtown Bay City; Delta College Midland Center in downtown Midland; and Delta College Saginaw Center in downtown Saginaw. The former Ricker Center in Saginaw was closed following the opening of the Downtown location.

== Athletics ==
Delta College offers six varsity sports competing in the NJCAA, and is in the MCCAA's conference. The Pioneers compete in men's basketball and women's basketball, baseball, softball, women's soccer and men's golf. Baseball and women's soccer were added as varsity sports during the 2011–2012 academic year. Delta has won three national championships: men's basketball in 1989, softball in 1999, and women's soccer in 2024.

== Media ==
The college owns and operates WDCQ-TV, the region's PBS station, and WUCX-FM, the NPR affiliate, owned by Central Michigan University (CMU) and co-operated by Delta College and CMU. Collectively, these stations are known as Delta College Public Media and they serve an audience of 1.2 million people in mid-Michigan.

The college's student-run newspaper is the Delta Collegiate and has been published since the college opened in 1961. The newspaper prints a new issue every two weeks during the fall and winter semesters. The Library Learning Information Center (LLIC) has an online archive of the first 50 years of the Delta Collegiate.

== Notable alumni ==
- Mike Hoadley, Michigan state legislator
- Jake Kiszka, guitarist for the American rock band Greta Van Fleet.
- Faith Webber, soccer player

== See also ==
- WDCQ-TV
- WUCX-FM
