= WZPX-TV =

Television station in Battle Creek, Michigan

- Battle Creek–Kalamazoo–; Grand Rapids, Michigan; United States
- City: Battle Creek, Michigan
- Channels: Digital: 21 (UHF); Virtual: 43

Programming
- Affiliations: 43.1: Ion Television; for others, see § Subchannels

Ownership
- Owner: Inyo Broadcast Holdings (sale to the E. W. Scripps Company pending); (Inyo Broadcast Licenses LLC)

History
- First air date: October 11, 1996
- Former call signs: WJUE (1996–1997); WILV (1997–1998)
- Former channel numbers: Analog: 43 (UHF, 1996–2009); Digital: 44 (UHF, until 2019)
- Former affiliations: inTV (1996–1998); UPN (secondary, 1996–1999); The WB (secondary, 1999–2006)
- Call sign meaning: Pax

Technical information
- Licensing authority: FCC
- Facility ID: 71871
- ERP: 400 kW
- HAAT: 278.2 m (913 ft)
- Transmitter coordinates: 42°34′15.5″N 85°28′8.9″W

Links
- Public license information: Public file; LMS
- Website: iontelevision.com

WZPX-TV (channel 43) is a television station licensed to Battle Creek, Michigan, United States, serving as the Ion Television affiliate for West Michigan. Owned by Inyo Broadcast Holdings, the station maintains offices on Horizon Drive in Grand Rapids and a transmitter on South Norris Road in Orangeville Township.

Until 2019, the station's transmitter was located in Vermontville Township in western Eaton County (in the Lansing market).

== History ==
WZPX first signed on the air on October 11, 1996, as WJUE, carrying infomercials for most of the day as part of Paxson Communications' inTV service, along with programming from the United Paramount Network (UPN) as a secondary affiliation. The station's original licensee was Horizon Broadcasting Corporation, which Paxson Communications acquired before the station's sign-on. When Paxson bought WBSX-TV in Ann Arbor (now WPXD-TV), WJUE was spun off to DP Media, a sister company because of Federal Communications Commission (FCC) ownership rules in effect at the time. WBSX's transmitter was located near Chelsea in northwestern Washtenaw County, which was close enough to the Ingham County line to give WBSX city-grade coverage of Lansing. Jackson, the second-largest city in the Lansing market, also got a fairly strong signal from WBSX. At the time, the FCC normally did not allow common ownership of stations with overlapping signals, and would not even consider granting a waiver for a city-grade overlap. Even though the two stations were in different markets, the FCC ruled that WJUE and WBSX were effectively a duopoly, forcing WJUE's sale. However, Paxson continued to operate the station under a local marketing agreement (LMA). Within a year, the station changed its call letters to WILV.

On August 31, 1998, the station became a charter affiliate of Pax TV, and changed its call letters to the current WZPX-TV. One year later, on August 31, 1999, UPN programming moved to Grand Rapids-based WXSP-CA (channel 15). On October 6 of that year, WZPX became a secondary affiliate of The WB. UPN would later find an affiliate in Lansing on WHTV (channel 18) on October 16, 2000. During this time, the network's Detroit owned-and-operated station WKBD-TV was carried as an out-of-market signal on local cable providers. In 2000, when the FCC relaxed its ownership rules to allow ownership of stations with overlapping coverage, Paxson repurchased the station outright.

As UPN, WB and Pax TV all offered prime time programming on weekdays, WZPX had scheduling conflicts during its affiliations with the former two networks. It carried the Pax programs on the same days and times as other stations, programs from UPN delayed to 11 p.m. and midnight, respectively, and programs from The WB on a one-day delay, two hours before prime time. For example, WB primetime programs that aired on Tuesdays at 8 p.m. in other markets aired on Wednesdays at 6 p.m. on WZPX; promotional spots for these programs announced their local time slots. The station carried a brief announcement when switching between programs from the differing networks. The Disney's One Too/UPN Kids blocks ran on weekday mornings, while Kids' WB ran on weekday afternoons; the Kids' WB Saturday block still aired on Saturday mornings. The Pax programming bumped from the afternoon slot simply moved earlier in the day in place of infomercials that would normally air in that slot at the time. In part, because the station had the added draw of UPN and later WB programming, WZPX was at one point one of Pax TV's highest-rated affiliates.

Despite the large signal overlap between WZPX and WPXD, Lansing-area cable providers opted to carry WZPX as the Ion Television station since its signal was broadcast closer from Vermontville Township, within the Lansing television market. WPXD has since moved its transmitter to a tower in Southfield; as a result, its signal no longer covers Lansing or Jackson.

Due to the closure of The WB on September 17, 2006, WZPX became solely an Ion owned-and-operated station (The CW and MyNetworkTV chose to affiliate with subchannels of WWMT and WXSP-CD, respectively, allowing full prime time carriage of their schedules).

=== Sale to Scripps and resale to Inyo; pending sale back to Scripps ===
On September 24, 2020, the Cincinnati-based E. W. Scripps Company announced that it would purchase Ion Media for $2.65 billion, with financing from Berkshire Hathaway. With this purchase, Scripps divested 23 Ion-owned stations, allowing the merged company to fully comply with the FCC local and national ownership regulations. Scripps has agreed to a transaction with Inyo Broadcast Holdings, who has agreed to maintain Ion affiliations for the stations. Had Scripps decided to keep WZPX-TV, it would have become a sister station to Fox affiliate WXMI (channel 17).

Scripps announced its repurchase of all Inyo stations on February 26, 2026.

== Technical information ==
=== Subchannels ===
The station's signal is multiplexed:

Subchannels of WZPX-TV
| Subchannel | Res. | Short name | Programming |
|---|---|---|---|
| 43.1 | 720p | ION | Ion Television |
| 43.2 | 480i | CourtTV | Court TV |
| 43.3 | 480i | Grit | Grit |
| 43.4 | 480i | Laff | Laff |
| 43.5 | 480i | Mystery | Ion Mystery |
| 43.6 | 480i | BUSTED | Busted |
| 43.7 | 480i | GameSho | Game Show Central |
| 43.8 | 480i | HSN | HSN |
| 43.9 | 480i | QVC2 | QVC2 |

=== Analog-to-digital conversion ===
WZPX-TV's digital signal on UHF channel 44 signed on November 1, 2008 (The Worship Network was removed from all Ion-owned stations, including WZPX, on February 1, 2010). The station shut down its analog signal, over UHF channel 43, on June 12, 2009, as part of the federally mandated transition from analog to digital television. The station's digital signal remained on its pre-transition UHF channel 44, using virtual channel 43.
