= WUHQ =

WUHQ may refer to:

- WUHQ-LD, a television station (channel 29) licensed to serve Grand Rapids, Michigan, United States
- WOTV, a television station (channel 20) licensed to serve Battle Creek, Michigan, which held the call sign WUHQ-TV from 1978 to 1992
