= WXSP-CD =

Television station in Grand Rapids, Michigan

ATSC 3.0 station
- Grand Rapids–Kalamazoo–; Battle Creek, Michigan; United States
- City: Grand Rapids, Michigan
- Channels: Digital: 15 (UHF); Virtual: 15
- Branding: WXSP The X

Programming
- Affiliations: 15.1: Independent with MyNetworkTV; 15.2: The Nest; 15.3: Comet

Ownership
- Owner: Nexstar Media Group; (Nexstar Media Inc.)
- Sister stations: WOOD-TV, WOTV; Tegna: WZZM

History
- First air date: July 23, 1986
- Former call signs: W29AD (1986–1988); W15AM (1988–1996); WOWD-LP (1996–2000); WXSP-LP (2000–2002); WXSP-CA (2002–2010)
- Former channel number: Analog: 29 (UHF, 1986–1988), 15 (UHF, 1988–2010)
- Former affiliations: World Harvest Television (1986–1995); local weather (1995–1999); UPN (1999–2006)
- Call sign meaning: "X Sports"; Other repeaters have the call pattern "WO" for WOOD-TV, followed by a two-letter abbreviation of their city of license

Technical information
- Licensing authority: FCC
- Facility ID: 36851
- Class: CD
- ERP: 15 kW
- HAAT: 124 m (407 ft)
- Transmitter coordinates: 43°1′1″N 85°44′25″W
- Translator(s): see § Repeaters

Links
- Public license information: Public file; LMS

WXSP-CD (channel 15) is a low-power, Class A television station licensed to Grand Rapids, Michigan, United States, serving West Michigan. It is programmed primarily as an independent station, but maintains a secondary affiliation with MyNetworkTV. WXSP-CD is owned by Nexstar Media Group alongside NBC affiliate WOOD-TV (channel 8) and ABC affiliate WOTV (channel 41); Nexstar's Tegna subsidiary owns fellow ABC affiliate WZZM (channel 13). WXSP-CD, WOOD-TV and WOTV share studios on College Avenue Southeast in the Heritage Hill section of Grand Rapids; WXSP-CD's transmitter is located in Walker (along I-96). Another repeater station licensed to Grand Rapids, WOLP-CD (channel 35), utilizes and is co-located with WOOD-TV's transmitter southwest of Middleville.

== History ==
The station signed on the air on July 23, 1986, as W29AD, broadcasting on UHF channel 29. It moved to UHF channel 15 and acquired the W15AM calls on January 12, 1988. In the station's early days, it was a translator for World Harvest Television from WHME-TV in South Bend, Indiana, which is owned by LeSEA Broadcasting (now Family Broadcasting Corporation). The station was then purchased by LIN TV, the owner of WOOD-TV, and converted to the station's Local Weather Station (LWS) format with the call sign WOWD-LP (variation on WOOD-TV). WOWD and its low-power network of repeaters aired 24-hour weather information direct from WOOD-TV's weather center, including current conditions and severe weather coverage. This was in an early pre-digital format comparable to the now defunct NBC Weather Plus.

The weather programming aired from the mid-1990s until it switched to a general entertainment programming format a few years later. It featured graphic displays of various current conditions and forecasts as well as periodic forecast segments from WOOD-TV's meteorologists. Short commercial breaks would feature promotional advertising for WOOD-TV's news and entertainment programming, as well as LWS' station identification. A format change took place when it became a UPN affiliate on August 31, 1999 (displacing that network from secondary carriage on WOOD-TV and WOTV), prompting the move of LWS to the early morning hours and the adoption of new calls, WXSP-LP. The call-sign WXSP-CA was acquired after it became a Class A station, which meets stricter requirements than most low-powered television stations. WXSP-CD continues to carry WOOD-TV's radar in late night weekend slots when paid programming is unable to be sold.

On January 24, 2006, the Warner Bros. unit of Time Warner and CBS Corporation announced that the two companies would shut down The WB and UPN and combine the networks' respective programming to create a new "fifth" network called The CW. On February 22, 2006, News Corporation announced the launch of a new "sixth" network called MyNetworkTV, which would be operated by Fox Television Stations and its syndication division Twentieth Television. MyNetworkTV was created to compete against another upstart network that would launch at the same time that September, The CW (an amalgamated network that was originally consisted primarily of UPN and The WB's higher-rated programs) as well as to give UPN and WB stations that were not mentioned as becoming CW affiliates another option besides converting to independent stations.

CBS affiliate WWMT (channel 3) announced on April 4 that it would affiliate with The CW on a new second digital subchannel. WXSP became available as a MyNetworkTV affiliate partly because then-WB affiliate WZPX-TV (channel 43) was also an i: Independent Television (now Ion) owned-and-operated station and ran WB programming on a 22-hour delay (prime time shows ran at 6 p.m. the night after the original broadcast and the Kids' WB Saturday block aired at 5 a.m. on Sunday mornings). As a result, Southwestern Michigan is one of the largest markets in which The CW was only available via digital subchannel/cable and on an entirely new station. It was reported that WXSP was in discussions to join The CW, but due to the station's heavy reliance upon professional sports during prime time and the network's concerns over preempted programming, the two sides could not come to an agreement.

For the final two weeks of UPN's existence, Fox affiliate WXMI (channel 17) aired WWE Smackdown until WWMT-DT2's launch. WXSP joined MyNetworkTV on September 5, while WWMT-DT2 signed on with The CW on September 18. On July 21, 2010, WXSP flash-cut from analog to a digital signal. The call letters were changed to WXSP-CD on August 30. In late-October 2010, LIN TV discontinued the simulcast of WXSP on WOTV-DT2, replacing it with a new digital subchannel network, TheCoolTV (which it discontinued on July 15, 2013). On July 1, 2013, LIN TV ended the simulcast of WXSP on WOOD-DT2, replacing that signal with Bounce TV.

On March 21, 2014, it was announced that Media General would acquire LIN. The deal closed on December 19, bringing WXSP, along with WOOD and WOTV, under common ownership with CBS affiliate WLNS-TV in Lansing.

On January 27, 2016, Media General announced that it had entered into a definite agreement to be acquired by Nexstar Broadcasting Group. The combined company was named Nexstar Media Group, and owned at the time 171 stations (including WOOD, WOTV and WXSP), serving an estimated 39% of households. Due to their low-power status, the WXSP-CD network of stations was not affected by the Nexstar-Tribune merger involving the spin-off of Tribune's WXMI to Scripps.

In August 2025, Nexstar Media Group agreed to acquire Tegna for $6.2 billion. In Grand Rapids, Tegna already owns WZZM.

== Programming ==
Overnights, WXSP airs a live feed of WOOD-TV's Doppler weather radar (known as "Storm Track Live"), along with NOAA Weather Radio broadcast audio. The station may sometimes air ABC or NBC programming in the event of preemptions by WOTV or WOOD-TV.

The station was the Grand Rapids home for the former Detroit Pistons, Detroit Red Wings, and Big Ten Conference syndicated packages. In 2024, the station announced a broadcast agreement with the Grand Rapids Rise of the Pro Volleyball Federation.

=== Newscasts ===
On October 21, 2007, WXSP introduced a 10 p.m. newscast produced by sister station WOOD-TV, titled News 8 at 10:00. The half-hour newscast competes with Fox station WXMI's hour-long prime time newscast, as well as a newscast on WWMT's second subchannel that debuted in 2008.

== Technical information ==
=== Subchannels ===
WXSP-CD's ATSC 1.0 channels are carried on the multiplexed signals of other West Michigan television stations, to the advantage of being at those station's full-power despite WXSP-CD's low-power status:

Subchannels provided by WXSP-CD (ATSC 1.0)
Subchannel	Res.	Short name	Programming	ATSC 1.0 host
15.1	720p	WXSP CD	MyNetworkTV	WOOD-TV
15.2	480i	theNest	The Nest	WXMI
15.3	480i	Comet	Comet	WWMT

=== ATSC 3.0 ===
The station's digital signal is multiplexed, with the repeaters below also maintaining the same channel map arrangement:

Subchannels of WXSP-CD
Subchannel	Res.	Short name	Programming
3.1	1080i	CBS	CBS (WWMT)
3.10	1080p	T2	T2
3.11	1080p	PBTV	Pickleballtv
3.20		GMLOOP	GameLoop
8.1	1080i	WOOD TV	NBC (WOOD-TV)
15.4	720p	WXSP-CD	Independent with MyNetworkTV
17.1	720p	FOX17DT	Fox (WXMI)
41.1	720p	WOTV	ABC (WOTV)

Subchannel streamed via the Internet

=== Repeaters ===
Due to its low-power status, WXSP-CD's broadcasting radius only covers the immediate Grand Rapids area. Therefore, in order to serve the entire Grand Rapids–Kalamazoo–Battle Creek market, it is relayed on five Class A translators that usually repeat WXSP-CD's programming, but currently all share in hosting the market's ATSC 3.0 signals:

Translators of WXSP-CD
Station	City of license	Channel; TV (RF)	Facility ID	ERP	HAAT	Transmitter coordinates	Public license; information
WOLP-CD	Grand Rapids	35 (35)	167892	14.4 kW	179.7 m (590 ft)	42°41′14.7″N 85°30′35″W	Public file; LMS
WOBC-CD	Battle Creek	14 (16)	67001	37 kW	75 m (246 ft)	42°17′16.7″N 85°9′54.3″W	Public file; LMS
WOMS-CD	Muskegon	29 (29)	67895	.7 kW	156 m (512 ft)	43°15′45.06″N 86°4′34.19″W	Public file; LMS
WOHO-CD	Holland	33 (33)	28926	.52 kW	125 m (410 ft)	42°48′59.10″N 85°57′20.17″W	Public file; LMS
WOKZ-CD	Kalamazoo	50 (33)	36841	.071 kW	70 m (230 ft)	42°17′48.0″N 85°38′29.0″W	Public file; LMS
