= Lee Cowan =

American television reporter, correspondent

- Born: Leland P. Cowan; Salt Lake City, Utah, U.S.
- Education: University of Washington
- Occupation: Television journalist
- Notable credit(s): NBC Nightly News reporter (2007–2011); CBS Evening News reporter (1996–2006, 2011-present); WWMT anchor (1995–1996)

Leland P. Cowan is a CBS News National Correspondent for the CBS Evening News, and is a substitute anchor for CBS Sunday Morning.

== Biography ==
Cowan was born and raised in Salt Lake City, Utah, a son of Leland B. Cowan, a surgical and radiation oncologist, and Constance W. Cowan. He is a 1988 graduate of the University of Washington with a double major in communications and speech communications. He is married to Molly Palmer, a television associate producer and daughter of television news correspondent John Palmer and writer Nancy Doyle Palmer. They live in Santa Monica and have two sons.

Cowan was a frequent correspondent for NBC Nightly News with Brian Williams. Prior to joining NBC News, he was a reporter for CBS News in the CBS NEWSPATH division. He previously worked for NBC affiliate WLWT in Cincinnati, CBS affiliate WWMT in Kalamazoo, Michigan, KCOY in Santa Maria, California and KIEM in Eureka, California.
