= Channel 41 virtual TV stations in the United States =

The following television stations operate on virtual channel 41 in the United States:

- K06QR-D in Eugene, Oregon
- K14QT-D in Texarkana, Texas
- K16AZ-D in Glasgow, Montana
- K17FA-D in Willmar, Minnesota
- K17MX-D in Frost, Minnesota
- K22MN-D in Fort Peck, Montana
- K26NF-D in Ellesnburg, Washington
- K26NU-D in Willmar, Minnesota
- K30QC-D in Ridgecrest, California
- K32NM-D in Des Moines, Iowa
- K32OI-D in Eureka, California
- K33ID-D in Ridgecrest, California
- K34AF-D in Alexandria, Minnesota
- K34MZ-D in Prosser, Washington
- K41KX-D in Joplin, Missouri
- KBCA in Alexandria, Louisiana
- KBFY-LD in Fortuna, Arizona
- KCBB-LD in Boise, Idaho
- KCBZ-LD in Casper, Wyoming
- KCRP-CD in Corpus Christi, Texas
- KCYH-LD in Ardmore, Oklahoma
- KCYU-LD in Yakima, Washington
- KDBK-LD in Bakersfield, California
- KENH-LD in Hot Springs, Arkansas
- KEUS-LD in San Angelo, Texas
- KMYT-TV in Tulsa, Oklahoma
- KNOV-CD in New Orleans, Louisiana
- KOXO-CD in Portland, Oregon
- KPDF-CD in Phoenix, Arizona
- KPTO-LD in Pocatello, Idaho
- KPXM-TV in St. Cloud, Minnesota
- KRHT-LD in Redding, California
- KRMT in Denver, Colorado
- KSFZ-LD in Springfield, Missouri
- KSHB-TV in Kansas City, Missouri
- KTFF-LD in Fresno, California
- KTFQ-TV in Albuquerque, New Mexico
- KVER-CD in Indio, California
- KVMM-CD in Santa Barbara, California
- KWEX-DT in San Antonio, Texas
- KXDA-LD in Garland, Texas
- KXTS-LD in Victoria, Texas
- W15EG-D in Corning, New York
- W23EW-D in Springfield, Illinois
- W30EH-D in Fort Wayne, Indiana
- WBME-CD in Milwaukee, Wisconsin
- WDRB in Louisville, Kentucky
- WDUM-LD in Philadelphia, Pennsylvania
- WEKA-LD in Canton, Ohio
- WHEH-LD in Lumberton, North Carolina
- WHTJ in Charlottesville, Virginia
- WIIQ in Demopolis, Alabama
- WJAN-CD in Miami, Florida
- WMGT-TV in Macon, Georgia
- WNCR-LD in Tarboro, North Carolina
- WNVC in Fairfax, Virginia
- WOTV in Battle Creek, Michigan
- WUCB-LD in Cobleskill, New York
- WXTV-DT in Paterson, New Jersey

The following stations, which are no longer licensed, formerly operated on virtual channel 41 in the United States:

- K31PG-D in Granite Falls, Minnesota
- KLMW-LD in Lufkin, Texas
- KMMA-CD in San Luis Obispo, California
- KQLP-LD in Lincoln, Nebraska
- KTJX-LD in College Station, Texas
- W42DZ-D in Adjuntas, Puerto Rico
- WFDE-LD in Champaign, Illinois
- WFRW-LD in Enterprise, Alabama
- WOCH-CD in Chicago, Illinois
- WRZY-LD in Buxton, North Carolina
- WVTA in Windsor, Vermont
