= WXMI =

Television station in Grand Rapids, Michigan

- Grand Rapids–Kalamazoo–; Battle Creek, Michigan; United States
- City: Grand Rapids, Michigan
- Channels: Digital: 19 (UHF); Virtual: 17
- Branding: Fox 17 West Michigan; Fox 17 News; The Spot – Grand Rapids 17 (17.2)

Programming
- Affiliations: 17.1: Fox; 17.2: Independent; for others, see § Subchannels

Ownership
- Owner: E. W. Scripps Company; (Scripps Broadcasting Holdings LLC)

History
- Founded: June 1, 1981
- First air date: March 18, 1982
- Former call signs: WWMA-TV (1982–1983)
- Former channel numbers: Analog: 17 (UHF, 1982–2009)
- Former affiliations: Independent (1982–1987)
- Call sign meaning: "Across West Michigan" (callsign predated Fox's launch by three years)

Technical information
- Licensing authority: FCC
- Facility ID: 68433
- ERP: 725 kW
- HAAT: 306 m (1,004 ft)
- Transmitter coordinates: 42°41′15″N 85°31′57″W
- Translator(s): W18ER-D 18 Muskegon; W36FA-D 36 Hesperia; 17 Battle Creek; WXMI-LD 32 Kalamazoo; WXSP-CD and repeaters in ATSC 3.0

Links
- Public license information: Public file; LMS
- Website: www.fox17online.com

WXMI (channel 17) is a television station licensed to Grand Rapids, Michigan, United States, serving West Michigan as an affiliate of the Fox network. Owned by the E. W. Scripps Company, the station maintains studios on Plaza Drive (near M-37) on the northern side of Grand Rapids, and its transmitter is located southwest of Middleville.

== History ==
The station signed on the air on March 18, 1982, as an independent station under the call sign WWMA, standing for "West Michigan's Alternative" (as it was the first locally based independent station in the market not associated with a religious organization). The station was founded and originally owned by Heritage Broadcasting Company. Approximately a year after signing on, additional shareholders bought control of the station and changed the call sign to the current WXMI on August 15, 1983. In 1987, WXMI signed an affiliation deal to become the market's Fox affiliate; it joined the network on April 9, 1987, when Fox expanded its programming offerings to include prime time programming. In 1989, the station's stock was purchased by a New York-based company headed by Robert Dudley called Odyssey Television Partners.

Nine years later, WXMI was purchased by Indianapolis-based Emmis Communications, which traded the station with sister KTZZ in Seattle to Tribune Broadcasting in 1998 in exchange for FM station WQCD in New York City.

=== Aborted acquisition by Sinclair Broadcast Group and resale to Standard Media Group ===
On May 8, 2017, Hunt Valley, Maryland–based Sinclair Broadcast Group entered into an agreement to acquire Tribune Media for $3.9 billion, plus the assumption of $2.7 billion in debt held by Tribune. Sinclair was precluded from acquiring WXMI directly, as it already owned CBS affiliate WWMT (channel 3). On April 24, 2018, Sinclair announced that it would sell WXMI and eight other stations – Sinclair-operated KOKH-TV in Oklahoma City, WRLH-TV in Richmond, KDSM-TV in Des Moines, WOLF-TV (along with LMA partners WSWB and WQMY) in Scranton–Wilkes-Barre and WXLV-TV in Greensboro/Winston-Salem–High Point, and Tribune-owned WPMT in York, Pennsylvania – to Standard Media Group (an independent broadcast holding company formed by private equity firm Standard General to assume ownership of and absolve ownership conflicts involving the aforementioned stations) for $441.1 million.

Tribune terminated the Sinclair deal on August 9, 2018, and filed a breach of contract lawsuit, three weeks after the FCC's July 18 vote to have the deal reviewed by an administrative law judge amid "serious concerns" about Sinclair's forthrightness in its applications to sell certain conflict properties; the sale to Standard Media was also cancelled, as it was predicated on the closure of the Sinclair–Tribune merger.

=== Sale to Scripps ===
On December 3, 2018, Irving, Texas–based Nexstar Media Group announced it would acquire the assets of Tribune Media for $6.4 billion in cash and debt. Nexstar was precluded from acquiring WXMI directly or indirectly, as it already owned NBC affiliate WOOD-TV (channel 8), MyNetworkTV affiliate WXSP-CD (channel 15), and Battle Creek–based ABC affiliate WOTV (channel 41). On March 20, 2019, the Cincinnati-based E. W. Scripps Company announced it would purchase WXMI from Nexstar upon consummation of the merger, as part of the company's sale of nineteen Nexstar- and Tribune-operated stations to Scripps and Tegna Inc. in separate deals worth $1.32 billion; the sale was completed on September 19, 2019.

WXMI signed local rights for Detroit Pistons basketball games for the 2026-27 NBA season.

== News operation ==
WXMI presently broadcasts 68 1/2 hours of locally produced newscasts each week (with 11 1/2 hours each weekday and 5 1/2 hours each on Saturdays and Sundays). In regards to the number of hours devoted to news programming, it is the highest local newscast output of any television station in the Grand Rapids market.

On January 11, 1999, WXMI started its news department and launched the market's first prime time newscast at 10 p.m. It originally aired for 35 minutes on weeknights and for a half-hour on weekends. The program would expand to a full hour seven nights a week in 2004. On August 28, 2006, the station premiered the Fox 17 Morning News. Originally a two-hour-long broadcast, it expanded to four hours (running from 5 to 9 a.m.) on September 15, 2008. On April 17, 2009, WXMI became the first station in West Michigan to begin broadcasting its local newscasts in high definition; at the time, WOOD-TV and ABC affiliates WZZM (channel 13) and WOTV produced their newscasts in merely widescreen enhanced-definition (WWMT became the second station in the market to upgrade to HD newscasts on April 16, 2011, followed by WOOD-TV/WOTV on October 22, 2011, and finally, by WZZM on December 3, 2011). On April 20, 2011, during the weekday morning show, the station officially unveiled a new logo, graphics, music package ("The Unexpected" by 615 Music), and set.

On September 21, 2009, WXMI debuted an hour-long newscast at 6 p.m. that competes against half-hour newscasts on WWMT, WOOD-TV, and WZZM and their national network evening newscasts. On March 7, 2011, the station debuted an hour-long lifestyle program at weeknights 5 p.m. called The One Seven; the final broadcast of the program aired only five months later on August 19, 2011. It was hosted by Michele DeSelms and Tim Doty and featured lifestyle segments, art, entertainment stories, cooking segments and some local news. The program was replaced by a traditional hour-long local newscast at 5 p.m. (which debuted without any promotion) on August 22, 2011. On March 2, 2013, WXMI debuted weekend morning newscasts, running for four hours from 5 to 9 a.m. on Saturdays and Sundays. The station added a nightly 11 p.m. newscast on June 2, 2014; a promo for the new newscast references the shift from the common Fox affiliate news tagline of "at 10 (o'clock) it's news, at 11 (o'clock) it's history", with the additional wording "we changed our mind". A 4 p.m. newscast debuted on September 8, 2014.

=== Notable former on-air staff ===
- Ahmed Fareed, sports anchor (2002–2003)

== Technical information ==
=== Subchannels ===
The station's signal is multiplexed:

Subchannels of WXMI
Subchannel	Res.	Short name	Programming
17.1	720p	FOX17DT	Fox
17.2	720p	TheSpot	The Spot – Grand Rapids 17
17.3	480i	Bounce	Bounce TV
17.4	480i	ION+	Ion Plus
17.5	480i	GetTV	Great
17.6	480i	QVC	QVC
17.7	480i	MVSGLD	MovieSphere Gold
15.2	480i	theNest	The Nest (WXSP-CD)

Broadcast on behalf of another station

From August 2006 to September 2007, The Tube aired on the station's second digital subchannel. In July 2010, the station reactivated its second digital subchannel to carry This TV, which moved to a new third subchannel on December 9 in anticipation of the December 31 launch of Antenna TV. In October 2019, WXMI-DT3 switched to Court TV (a network owned by Scripps sister company Katz Broadcasting), though it was a move planned by Tribune even before WXMI's sale to Scripps.

=== Analog-to-digital conversion ===
WXMI shut down its analog signal, over UHF channel 17, on June 12, 2009, as part of the federally mandated transition from analog to digital television. The station's digital signal remained on its pre-transition UHF channel 19, using virtual channel 17.

=== Translators ===
In addition to its main signal, the station also operates two translators, mainly to provide clear service of the station to lakeshore cities with varying terrain blocking reception of the main signal, and to address interference in farther portions of the market by former sister station WGN-TV from Chicago, which also broadcasts its digital signal on UHF channel 19. Two additional transmitters in the southern part of the market, officially classed as WXMI digital repeaters, serve the direct Kalamazoo area on channel 30 from the tower of WGVU-TV's Kalamazoo satellite WGVK, along with a second repeater licensed to Battle Creek on channel 17 transmitting from the city's south side; all four translators carry WXMI and its subchannel services, and all map via PSIP to channel 17. As of 2021, the six-station repeater network of WXSP-CD also carries 17.1 in the ATSC 3.0 format across West Michigan. This means it is possible for a television or receiver in the Grand Rapids market receiving an over-the-air signal to map out up to eleven different versions of WXMI's channel 17.1 on its channel map.

W42CB (channel 42) completed a flash-cut to digital-only broadcasting in November 2010. W52DB on analog channel 52 was replaced by a digital signal on channel 17 in December 2010. In late June 2011, the W52DB calls became W17DF-D. In mid-March 2019, W17DF-D moved from channel 17 to channel 18.

- WXMI (DRT) 23 Battle Creek
- W36FA-D 36 Hesperia
- WXMI (DRT) 32 Kalamazoo
- W18ER-D 18 Muskegon
