= Janet Shamlian =

American journalist

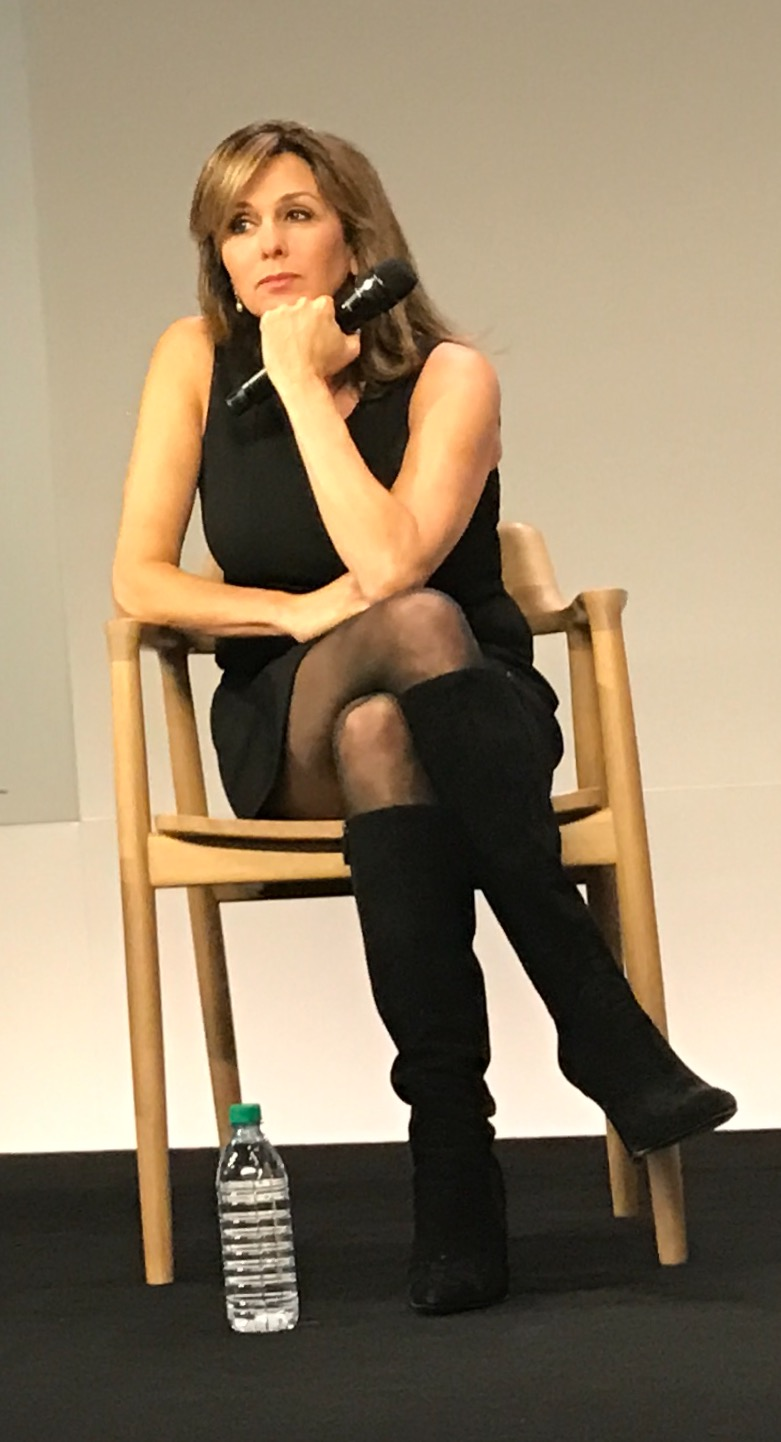
- Janet Shamlian in New York 2018
- Born: May 14, 1962 (age 63); Oak Park, Illinois
- Education: University of Missouri
- Occupations: Journalist; Correspondent
- Employer: CBS News (2019-2025)

Janet Shamlian (born May 14, 1962) is a former national correspondent for CBS News reporting for CBS Mornings and the CBS Evening News. Previously, she was a correspondent for NBC News and reported for The Today Show, NBC Nightly News and MSNBC.

== Professional career ==
In her time at CBS News, she has reported on the biggest stories from across the country including the 2022 Uvalde school shooting, the 2023 Nashville school shooting, the overturning of Roe v. Wade, hurricanes, storms and fires. She covers a range of consumer and medical stories, and was featured on the CBS Evening News almost daily during the COVID-19 pandemic reporting on COVID-19 and its impact. Before joining NBC News, Shamlian was a stay at home mom to five children. The improbable journey from stay at home mom to network correspondent is documented in the 2017 book 'Extreme You.' She has worked as a reporter at WBBM-TV in Chicago, KHOU-TV and KPRC-TV, both in Houston, and WOOD-TV in Grand Rapids, Michigan.

At NBC News in 2016, Shamlian obtained the first interview with Arianne Zucker, the actress who Donald Trump made suggestive comments about in an Access Hollywood video. In her time at NBC, she also covered the Pulse nightclub shooting, Hurricane Katrina and the Deepwater Horizon oil spill. She reported from France in the early hours after the 2016 Nice truck attack, where she was vacationing with family. Shamlian conducted the first evening network broadcast interview with Michelle Obama, the wife of then presidential candidate Barack Obama, on the NBC Nightly News in 2007.

In July 2019, Shamlian was hired by CBS News as a correspondent. She got laid off on Oct 30, 2025 with seven other on-air personalities, all of whom are women.

== Awards and recognition ==
Shamlian is the recipient of numerous national Emmy awards, as well as an Alfred I. duPont-Columbia University Award and Peabody Awards for a report on poverty in America "In Plain Sight."

== Early life and education ==
Born in Oak Park, Illinois, Janet Shamlian grew up in Park Ridge, Illinois. Shamlian graduated from Maine South High School in Park Ridge, Illinois, and received a bachelor's degree in Journalism, from the Missouri School of Journalism, where she has served as commencement speaker.

== Personal life ==
Shamlian lives in Texas and is a mother of 5 children. She was a figure skater as a teen and covered the sport for NBC News. She is of Armenian and Irish descent.
