= John Lansing (journalist) =

American journalist and broadcaster (1957–2024)

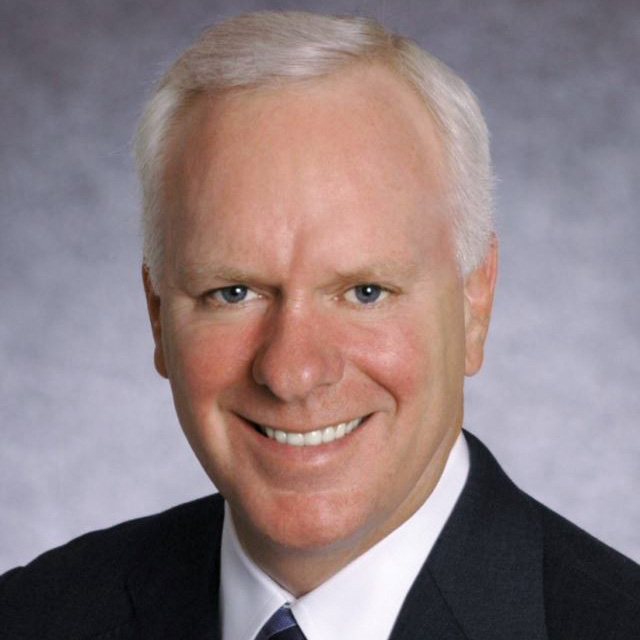
- Lansing in 2016
- Born: July 31, 1957; Minneapolis, Minnesota, U.S.
- Died: August 14, 2024 (aged 67); Eagle River, Wisconsin, U.S.
- Education: Bellarmine University

John Francis Lansing (July 31, 1957 – August 14, 2024) was an American journalist and broadcaster. He served as president of the Scripps Networks from 2005 to 2013, the chief of U.S. Agency for Global Media from 2015 to 2019, and the CEO of NPR from 2019 to February 2024.

== Career ==
Lansing became interested in working in news from a young age. He began work in radio and TV in 1975, at age 17, two days after his high school graduation, when he was hired as a technician and camera operator for WPSD-TV in Paducah, Kentucky. He later was promoted to videographer, and continued to work for the station through 1979. He went on to work for NBC-affiliate WAVE-TV, in Louisville, Kentucky as a news photographer. While working in Louisville, Lansing attended night classes at Bellarmine University; he left the school two semesters before graduating after being hired at WWMT-TV in Kalamazoo, Michigan.

In 1988, Lansing became assistant news director at KARE-TV in Minneapolis; he became news director of WCCO-TV, also in Minneapolis, in 1990. While at WCCO, Lansing was noted for his "family sensitive" approach to news reporting, in contrast to more popular sensationalist reporting. During coverage of the 1991 Halloween blizzard, Lansing set up phone interviews with police and with reporters who were unable to come to the station.

In late 1994, Lansing moved to Chicago to work as news director at WBBM-TV. While there, he focused on local and regional news. In August 1995, Lansing moved to WXYZ-TV in Detroit to work as vice president and station manager. In 1995, he took the same position at WEWS-TV in Cleveland, Ohio.

He served as president of the Scripps Networks from 2005 to 2013. While working for Scripps, he returned to Bellarmine University; he graduated in 2009 with a bachelor's degree in communications. Following his departure from Scripps Networks, Lansing was named President and Chief Executive Officer of CTAM (formerly known as Cable and Telecommunications Association for Marketing). He led the trade association for two years, overseeing collaborative marketing initiatives and growth strategies for North American television programmers and cable providers as they adapted to emerging digital content platforms. In September 2015, Lansing stepped down from CTAM after being appointed by the Broadcasting Board of Governors to lead the U.S. Agency for Global Media. Although Lansing retired in 2013, he left retirement in August 2015 when he was named CEO of the Broadcasting Board of Governors (later renamed the U.S. Agency for Global Media).

Lansing became CEO of NPR in October 2019, succeeding Jarl Mohn. During his tenure at NPR, Lansing focused on "the need to diversify the staff, its programming, its story selection and its audiences to better reflect American life". He also dealt with leading the organization during the onset of the COVID-19 pandemic, and creating the infrastructure for employees to work and broadcast entirely from home. He announced his retirement from NPR in September 2023.

In May 2021, Lansing was inducted into the Kentucky Journalism Hall of Fame. In March 2024, Lansing joined the USC Annenberg Washington Center as a senior Fellow.

== Personal life and death ==
Lansing was from Minneapolis, Minnesota. He was married to Jean, with whom he had four children. In March 2021, he underwent heart surgery which replaced one heart valve and part of the aorta.

Lansing died at his home in Wisconsin on August 14, 2024, at the age of 67.
