= WOOD-TV =

Television station in Grand Rapids, Michigan

- Grand Rapids–Kalamazoo–; Battle Creek, Michigan; United States
- City: Grand Rapids, Michigan
- Channels: Digital: 7 (VHF); Virtual: 8
- Branding: WOOD-TV 8; News 8

Programming
- Affiliations: 8.1: NBC; for others, see § Subchannels

Ownership
- Owner: Nexstar Media Group; (Nexstar Media Inc.)
- Sister stations: WOTV, WXSP-CD; Tegna: WZZM

History
- First air date: August 15, 1949
- Former call signs: WLAV-TV (1949–1951); WOTV (1972–1992)
- Former channel number: Analog: 7 (VHF, 1949–1953), 8 (VHF, 1953–2009)
- Former affiliations: All secondary: CBS (1949–1960); ABC (1949–1962); DuMont (1949–1955); UPN (1995–1999)
- Call sign meaning: Furnwood Broadcasting (calls came from radio sister station, which was funded originally by furniture manufacturers)

Technical information
- Licensing authority: FCC
- Facility ID: 36838
- ERP: 30 kW
- HAAT: 288 m (945 ft)
- Transmitter coordinates: 42°41′14.7″N 85°30′35″W
- Translator(s): see § Translators

Links
- Public license information: Public file; LMS
- Website: www.woodtv.com

WOOD-TV (channel 8) is a television station licensed to Grand Rapids, Michigan, United States, serving as the NBC affiliate for West Michigan. It is owned by Nexstar Media Group alongside WOTV (channel 41), an ABC affiliate, and WXSP-CD (channel 15), an independent station with MyNetworkTV; Nexstar's Tegna subsidiary owns fellow ABC affiliate WZZM (channel 13). WOOD-TV, WOTV and WXSP-CD share studios on College Avenue Southeast in Grand Rapids; WOOD-TV's transmitter is located southwest of Middleville.

In addition to its main signal, WOOD-TV operates Class A digital translator WOGC-CD (UHF channel 25), licensed to Holland with a transmitter in Zeeland. There is also a digital repeater on channel 34, also licensed to Grand Rapids, with a transmitter in the Wolf Lake section of Egelston Township.

== History ==
The station signed on the air on August 15, 1949, as WLAV-TV, originally broadcasting on VHF channel 7; it was the fourth television station in Michigan and the first located outside of Detroit. The station was originally owned by Grand Rapids businessman Leonard Adrian Versluis, who in 1940 had also signed on Grand Rapids' second radio station, WLAV (1340 AM, now WJRW).

The station had no primary affiliation at the outset, instead cherry-picking from all four networks of the day-NBC, CBS, ABC and DuMont. Programming was fed via microwave from Chicago to its transmitter on 92nd Street in Grand Rapids. The station could be seen clearly within 55 miles of Grand Rapids, as far west as Muskegon and Grand Haven, as far south as South Haven and as far east as Lansing. Studios were located in the Grand Rapids National Bank Building (now the McKay Tower).

In 1951, Versluis sold the television station to Grandwood Broadcasting for $1.37 million. The Bitner Group subsidiary was also owner of WOOD (1300 AM), the first radio station in Grand Rapids. Grandwood had originally applied for its television license back in 1948, but the application just barely made a deadline prior to the Federal Communications Commission (FCC)'s freeze on new television construction permits. In fact, the application for WLAV-TV had been one of the last construction permits issued before the freeze. Grandwood eventually grew tired of waiting and cut a deal with Versluis to buy the station. On October 19, WLAV-TV changed its call letters to WOOD-TV to match its radio sister and began airing from a new transmitter in northeastern Grand Rapids. WOOD radio had been an NBC Radio affiliate since 1935, so WOOD-TV became a primary NBC affiliate, retaining secondary affiliations with the other three networks. It lost DuMont in 1956 when that network ended operations.

During the FCC's licensing freeze the commission developed channel allocation and separation to eliminate interference between stations with the same frequency. As a result, WOOD-TV was reassigned to channel 8 to avoid interference with WLS-TV and WXYZ-TV on channel 7 in Chicago and Detroit. It moved to channel 8 and increased its transmitter power from 28,000 to 100,000 watts on December 8, 1953. The channel change was promoted as "Mark the date: We move to Channel Eight on December Eight". In 1955, it moved to its current facilities in the Heritage Hill section of Grand Rapids, where its new studios replaced the Bissell mansion (of Bissell vacuum fame) and are across the street from the Voigt House Victorian Museum. All of the Bitner Group's stations were then sold, for a then-record-breaking $16 million, to Time Inc. in 1957, who later subordinated their acquisition under its in 1961 established subsidiary Time-Life, Inc.– as Time–Life Broadcasting, Inc. at first.

Under Time Inc.'s stewardship, WOOD-TV moved to its current tower near Middleville, halfway between Grand Rapids and Kalamazoo. Channel 8's move prompted Kalamazoo-based CBS affiliate WKZO-TV (channel 3, now WWMT to build its own tower four miles south near Gun Lake. Sister FM station WOOD-FM (105.7 mHz, now WSRW-FM) also broadcast from the new tower, and still operates from there today years after the two stations went their separate ways. From its new location, channel 8 dropped CBS, but maintained a secondary ABC affiliation until 1962 when WZZM (channel 13) began operations.

Due to a now-repealed FCC rule in place at the time (which prohibited TV and radio stations in the same market but under different ownership from sharing the same call sign), the station's call letters were changed to WOTV on July 1, 1972, when WOOD radio was sold. Time-Life also sold most of its television stations to McGraw-Hill that year (initially intending to include WOTV in the deal, though it was retained), but held on to WOTV until 1983 when it was sold to LIN Broadcasting. On June 1, 1992, the station reclaimed its original WOOD-TV call sign with WOOD radio's permission (the above-mentioned FCC call sign rule had been repealed by that time). The station then donated the WOTV calls to WUHQ, the ABC affiliate for the southern portion of the West Michigan market with whom it had recently signed a local marketing agreement (LMA).

In 1994, LIN Broadcasting spun off its television division into a separate company known as LIN TV Corporation, but WOOD-TV was not included in the transaction. Instead, the station became wholly owned by AT&T (which also owned a 45 percent interest in LIN TV at the time), when that company absorbed the remainder of LIN Broadcasting in 1995; however, LIN TV continued to manage both WOOD-TV and WOTV. LIN TV reacquired WOOD-TV and its LMA with WOTV in 1999 when AT&T sold-off its stake in the company to Hicks, Muse, Tate & Furst. LIN TV eventually purchased WOTV outright in 2001.

On March 21, 2014, it was announced that Media General would acquire LIN. The deal closed on December 19, bringing WOOD, along with WOTV and WXSP-CD, under common ownership with CBS affiliate WLNS-TV in Lansing.

On January 27, 2016, Media General announced that it had entered into a definitive agreement to be acquired by Nexstar Broadcasting Group. The combined company will be known as Nexstar Media Group, and will own 171 stations, including WOOD-TV, serving an estimated 39% of households. The acquisition was completed on January 17, 2017.

On December 3, 2018, Nexstar announced it would acquire the assets of Tribune Media (owners of Fox affiliate WXMI) for $6.4 billion in cash and debt. Nexstar is precluded from acquiring WXMI directly or indirectly, as FCC regulations prohibit common ownership of more than two stations in the same media market, or two or more of the four highest-rated stations in the market. As such, Nexstar was required to sell either WXMI, WOOD and/or WOTV to separate, unrelated companies to address the ownership conflict. A sale of WXSP-CD was not required, as WXSP does not rank among the four highest-rated stations in the Grand Rapids–Kalamazoo–Battle Creek market and is not subject to FCC duopoly rules as it is licensed as a Class A low-power station. On March 20, 2019, it was announced Nexstar would keep both the WOOD-TV/WOTV duopoly and WXSP-CD and sell WXMI to the Cincinnati-based E. W. Scripps Company, as part of the company's sale of nineteen Nexstar- and Tribune-operated stations to Scripps and Tegna Inc. in separate deals worth $1.32 billion. the sale was completed on September 19, 2019.

In August 2025, Nexstar agreed to acquire Tegna, owner of WZZM, for $6.2 billion. The deal was completed on March 19, 2026, after the FCC's Media Bureau waived all existing regulations prohibiting Nexstar from owning more than two full-power stations in one market. A temporary restraining order issued one week later by the U.S. District Court for the Eastern District of California, later escalated to a preliminary injunction, has prevented Nexstar from integrating the stations.

== News operation ==
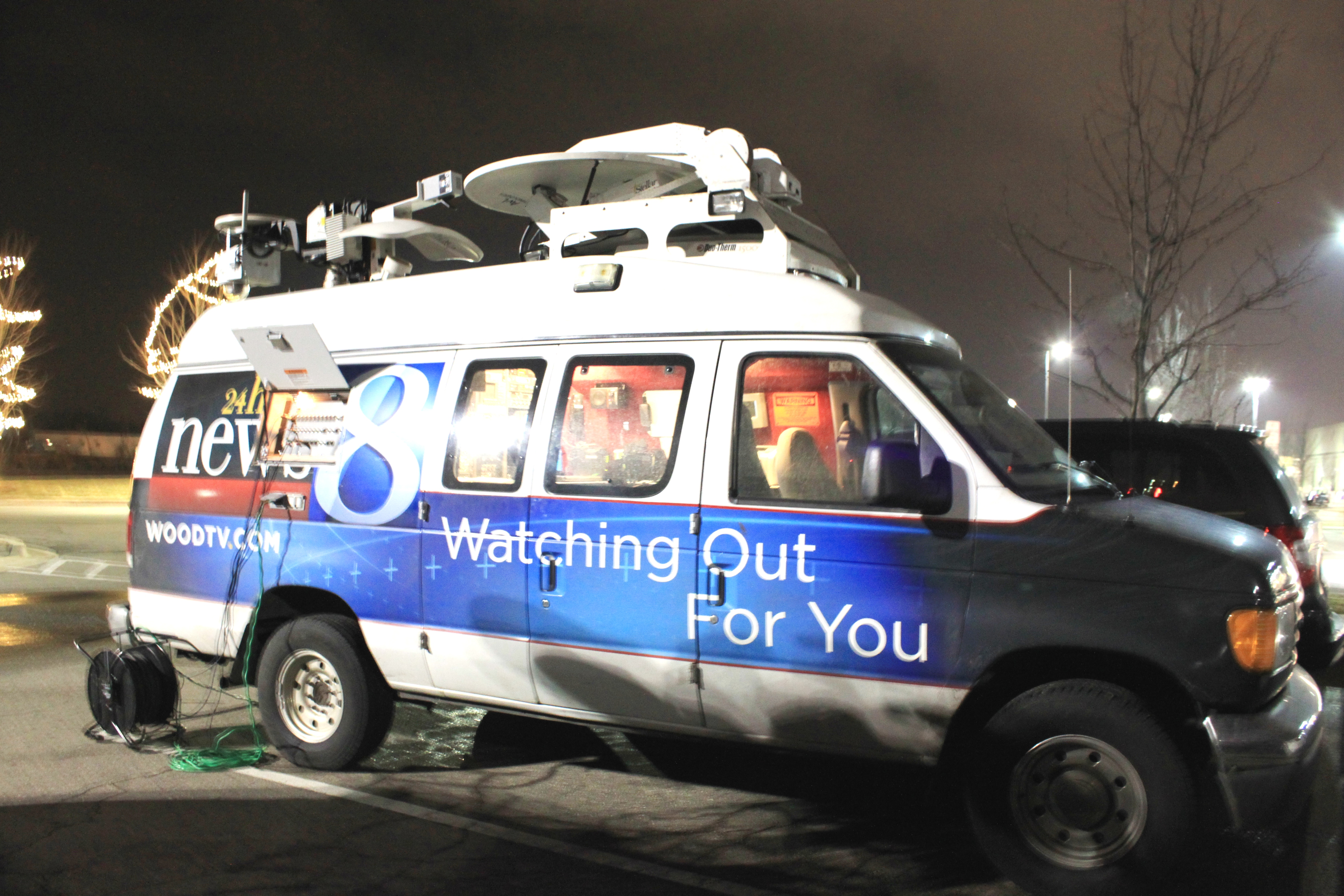
24 Hour News 8 remote van.

WOOD-TV presently broadcasts 44 hours of locally produced newscasts each week (with seven hours each weekday and 4 1/2 hours each on Saturdays and Sundays); in addition, the station produces a half-hour public affairs program To the Point with Rick Albin, which airs Sundays at 10 a.m.; a 25-minute sports highlight program Sports Overtime, which airs Sundays after the 11 p.m. newscast; and Football Frenzy, a weekly highlight program on Friday nights during the fall which covers high school football games as well as other sports news of the day (the 11 p.m. newscast is shortened to allow Football Frenzy to air during the regular time slot).

WOOD-TV had the distinction of being one of the last remaining broadcast television stations in the United States to use the "24 Hour News Source" format, which was popular in many markets during the early 1990s, and has been used by the station since 1990. The only other stations still using the format (as of 2015) are CW affiliate WISH-TV in Indianapolis and ABC affiliate KCRG-TV in Cedar Rapids, Iowa.

For most of the time since the mid-1980s, channel 8 has led the Nielsen ratings in West Michigan. However, for most of the 1990s, it waged a spirited three-way battle for the ratings lead with WWMT and WZZM. One reason is that it is the only major station whose news department equally covers all of the vast Grand Rapids–Kalamazoo–Battle Creek market, WWMT has historically focused on the southern portion of the market (being based in Kalamazoo), while WZZM focuses mostly on the northern portion.

WOOD-TV has many firsts in the market. It was the first West Michigan station to broadcast in color. It was the first West Michigan station to use electronic news gathering, in 1975. Five years later, it was the first area station to air live news from outside its studios. In 1983, it introduced the area's first television helicopter to assist in coverage. WOOD-TV's weekday morning newscast premiered in 1984 and aired for a half-hour at 6:30. This was expanded to a two-hour format in 1995 along with the weekday noon and weekend 6 p.m. newscast expanding to an hour. As a result, NBC Nightly News is preempted on weekends.

After taking over WOTV's operations, WOOD-TV then began simulcasting some of its newscasts on that station as well as airing specially produced newscasts covering Battle Creek and Kalamazoo. That station had shuttered its separate news department in 1990; despite serving the market's second-largest city, Kalamazoo, it had long been plagued by weak viewership as its reach was limited to the southern portion of the market. Since then, WOTV has largely functioned as WOOD-TV's Kalamazoo/Battle Creek bureau. In 1992, WOOD-TV launched a separate news department for WOTV. However, despite having WOOD-TV's resources behind it, it made no impact in the ratings. LIN TV finally decided to shut down WOTV's news operation permanently in August 2003. Since then, the station has simulcast some of WOOD-TV's newscasts (currently its weekday morning, 6 p.m. and 11 p.m. newscasts), but this time without any separate opens or segments.

On October 21, 2007, WOOD-TV began offering a nightly prime time newscast at 10 p.m. on WXSP-CD, joining the longer-established 10 p.m. newscast on Fox affiliate WXMI (channel 17) and CW affiliate WWMT-DT2. The entertainment and lifestyle magazine show eightWest premiered on October 5, 2009, and airs weekday mornings at 11 a.m. for an hour, as well as being streamed live on the station's website. Also on that date, WOOD-TV became the second station in southwestern Michigan to begin broadcasting its local newscasts in 16:9 widescreen enhanced definition. Although not truly high definition, the broadcast matches the ratio of HD television screens. The simulcasts on WOTV were included in the upgrade. On October 22, 2011, WOOD-TV became the third television station in southwestern Michigan (behind Fox affiliate WXMI and CBS affiliate WWMT) to broadcast local newscasts in high definition.

On September 20, 2016, WOOD-TV began a half-hour newscast at 7 p.m., becoming the first station in Grand Rapids to do so; as a result, Access Hollywood moved from WOOD-TV to sister station WOTV.

The station's weather team provides forecasts for iHeartMedia's Grand Rapids cluster (including its former radio sister), as well as Christian station WCSG.

=== Former downtown studio ===
Starting in September 2011, WOOD-TV began broadcasting all of its newscasts during ArtPrize from a temporary studio built inside the Grand Rapids Art Museum. During the live broadcasts, people were encouraged to come downtown and get a behind-the-scenes look at WOOD-TV's news operation. People standing outside the museum made up the backdrop behind the anchor desk. In 2017, the station made it a year-round studio when it partnered with the Grand Rapids Art Museum to launch the Media Arts Center. The noon newscast is anchored daily from the streetside studio. Also in 2017, WOOD-TV opened a streetside studio in downtown Kalamazoo overlooking Bronson Park. The station invites school groups to both studios during the school year for the "Storm Team 8 Weather Experience", an educational multi-media show hosted by Storm Team 8 meteorologists who teach kids about weather and science. The studio was eventually wound down in 2020 during the COVID-19 pandemic; Nexstar generally refuses to operate secondary studios for its stations unless needed by local market geography, and looked to cut unnecessary expenses after acquiring WOOD-TV.

=== Notable former on-air staff ===
- Carol Duvall
- Alan Gionet
- Steve Kmetko
- Steve Osunsami
- Janet Shamlian
- John Stehr
- Matt Winer — sportscaster, 1995–1997
- Ginger Zee

=== Controversies ===
In July 2022, WOOD-TV was one of two Michigan television stations to inadvertently publish test results related to the state's primary election. The webpages were picked up by conspiracy theorists as "proof" that some were engaging in "election fraud" in the state. The mock results came from the Associated Press, which transmitted them on the AP news wire as part of a test. WOOD-TV news director later confirmed the test results were published on the station's website by accident.

On June 13, 2023, WOOD-TV assistant news director Amy Fox sent a newsroom-wide memo urging reporters to curb their coverage of Pride Month events in the Grand Rapids area, noting that the station's prior coverage that week had upset conservative viewers. The memo also said, "If we are covering Pride events we need to consider how to make the story balanced and get both sides of the issue." The memo was picked up by several blogs, which caused a firestorm of social media backlash against the station and prompted a number of WOOD-TV journalists to affirm they had ignored the memo. Later that week, WOOD-TV news director Stanton Tang admitted he urged Fox to write and distribute the memo; journalists at the station called for his firing. The controversy ultimately prompted Nexstar to issue a formal apology, and Fox and Tang were removed from discussions about WOOD-TV's future Pride Month news coverage. Two weeks after the investigation started, Fox and Tang were fired, along with Madeline Odle and Luke Stier, two longtime executive producers who disagreed with the memo.

== Technical information ==
=== Subchannels ===
The station's signal is multiplexed:

Subchannels of WOOD-TV
Subchannel	Res.	Short name	Programming
8.1	1080i	WOOD TV	NBC
8.2	480i	Antenna	Antenna TV
8.3	480i	DEFY TV	Defy
15.1	720p	MyNet	MyNetworkTV (WXSP-CD)

Broadcast on behalf of another station

=== Translators ===
- WOOD-TV (DRT) 34 Grand Rapids
- WOGC-CD 25 Holland

=== Analog-to-digital conversion ===
WOOD-TV became the first station in the market to broadcast a high definition digital signal on VHF channel 7 on August 14, 1999. The station shut down its analog signal, over VHF channel 8, at 10 a.m. on June 12, 2009, as part of the federally mandated transition from analog to digital television. The station's digital signal remained on its pre-transition VHF channel 7, using virtual channel 8.
