= WOTV =

Television station in Battle Creek, Michigan, US

- Battle Creek–Kalamazoo–; Grand Rapids, Michigan; United States
- City: Battle Creek, Michigan
- Channels: Digital: 17 (UHF); Virtual: 41
- Branding: ABC 4 West Michigan; West Michigan CW (41.2)

Programming
- Affiliations: 41.1: ABC; 41.2: The CW; for others, see § Subchannels

Ownership
- Owner: Nexstar Media Group; (Nexstar Media Inc.)
- Sister stations: WOOD-TV, WXSP-CD; Tegna: WZZM

History
- First air date: July 24, 1971
- Former call signs: WUHQ-TV (1971–1992)
- Former channel numbers: Analog: 41 (UHF, 1971–2009); Digital: 20 (UHF, until 2019)
- Former affiliations: UPN (secondary, 1995–1999)
- Call sign meaning: Former call letters of WOOD-TV (1972–1992)

Technical information
- Licensing authority: FCC
- Facility ID: 10212
- ERP: 325 kW
- HAAT: 327.8 m (1,075 ft)
- Transmitter coordinates: 42°34′15.5″N 85°28′8.9″W

Links
- Public license information: Public file; LMS
- Website: www.woodtv.com/abc4

WOTV (channel 41, cable channel 4) is a television station licensed to Battle Creek, Michigan, United States, affiliated with ABC and The CW. It is owned by Nexstar Media Group alongside NBC affiliate WOOD-TV (channel 8) and WXSP-CD (channel 15), an independent station with MyNetworkTV; Nexstar's Tegna subsidiary owns fellow ABC affiliate WZZM (channel 13). WOTV, WOOD-TV and WXSP-CD share studios on College Avenue Southeast in Grand Rapids; WOTV's transmitter is located on South Norris Road in Orangeville Township. WOTV brands itself as ABC 4 West Michigan, based on its position on most area cable systems.

Channel 41's existence in Battle Creek is owed to the northerly location of the transmitter of Grand Rapids–based WZZM, which signed on in 1962 as a late insertion into the market. Because WZZM's transmitter is north of Grand Rapids in Grant, its signal does not reach Battle Creek, Kalamazoo, or other areas in the southern portion of the market. A group of local businessmen known as Channel 41, Inc., won the construction permit for channel 41 in 1970 after a predecessor unsuccessfully tried to sell out to WZZM; WUHQ-TV signed on in 1971 from studios in the former headquarters building of Fort Custer and has been an ABC affiliate since it began, creating a rare split affiliation. The station's attempts at local news programming were low-rated and inconsistent, with many changes in timing and strategy.

After WZZM's owners could not close on a merger approved by the Federal Communications Commission with Channel 41, Inc., in 1991, the company brokered the station's air time to channel 8, which began producing Battle Creek–Kalamazoo news inserts for air on the station. When channel 8 reclaimed the WOOD-TV call letters in 1992, WUHQ-TV became WOTV. The news inserts grew into a separate news operation that continued to exist until it was shut down in 2003, two years after WOOD-TV's then-owner, LIN Television, acquired the station outright. Since then, WOTV has offered ABC programming, a separate slate of syndicated programs, and WOOD-TV's local newscasts. Even though it attracts a fraction of the viewers of WZZM, it continues to provide better signal coverage in the market's southern tier. LIN merged with Media General in 2014, which merged with Nexstar in 2017; in 2026, Nexstar bought WZZM's owner, Tegna.

== The battle for ABC in southern West Michigan ==
In November 1962, West Michigan gained its third very high frequency (VHF) station when WZZM began broadcasting from Grand Rapids on channel 13 as an ABC affiliate. On paper, West Michigan now had full service from all three networks. The market was already served by Grand Rapids-based NBC affiliate WOOD-TV and Kalamazoo-based CBS affiliate WKZO-TV, which both broadcast from towers in Barry County, halfway between Grand Rapids and Kalamazoo. However, the drop-in of channel 13 to Grand Rapids, proposed in 1959 and accepted by the Federal Communications Commission (FCC) in 1961, came with a technical condition to maintain proper spacing from other stations on channel 13. WZZM had to build its transmitter north of Grand Rapids, near Muskegon, to satisfy the requirement for the transmitter to be at least 170 miles (274 km) from neighboring stations on channel 13. The channel 13 allocation was billed by the FCC as serving Kalamazoo and Grand Rapids. However, when the station began broadcasting, it was clear that the coverage was not as previously advertised. Reception in the market's southern tier was poor to nonexistent. Bill Tompkins of The Battle Creek Enquirer and News wrote that Battle Creek viewers found WZZM "about as elusive as a flying saucer", and reception in Kalamazoo also left much to be desired. Since WOOD-TV and WKZO-TV dropped all ABC programming from their schedules when WZZM came into service, viewers in this area had to depend on the part-time carriage of ABC programs by the stations in the Lansing–Jackson market.

In a bid to serve viewers in southern West Michigan, WZZM owner West Michigan Telecasters sought to remedy the shortfall by building translators in Kalamazoo and Battle Creek. The FCC approved the construction of a channel 12 translator in Kalamazoo in 1964, and the next year, the group applied to activate a similar facility on ultra high frequency (UHF) channel 83 in Battle Creek. That same year, a partnership known as BCU-TV applied for a new full-service station in Battle Creek on channel 65; partners included Mary Jane Morris and James Searer, who had once applied to own and been interim part-owner of WZZM, as well as supermarket executive Frederik Meijer. Channel 41 was substituted for channel 65 months later as part of changes to the FCC's UHF table of allocations. BCU-TV sought an affiliation with ABC and suggested a studio site near Augusta. The FCC granted BCU-TV a construction permit on September 28, 1967.

An obstacle continued to loom between WZZM and BCU-TV, as the FCC also approved the construction of a Battle Creek translator for WZZM, now on channel 74. This created an issue because both stations proposed to bring ABC programming to the city. West Michigan Telecasters sued BCU-TV in Kent County circuit court, seeking $3 million in damages for infringing on what it alleged was its exclusive right to provide ABC programming to West Michigan. WZZM activated its Battle Creek translator in late January 1968, but after the FCC then rescinded its grant for the Battle Creek translator and the United States Court of Appeals for the District of Columbia Circuit refused to stay the ruling, West Michigan Telecasters was forced to shut it down in March on grounds that the translator would be detrimental to the BCU-TV station's proposed operation.

On October 22, 1968, BCU-TV announced that it had agreed to sell the channel 41 permit, with the call sign WWWU-TV, to West Michigan Telecasters to be used as a satellite station of WZZM, as part of a transfer of stock arranged by Morris.

== Channel 41, Inc. ownership ==
Three days later, a group of Kalamazoo and Battle Creek businessmen under the name Channel 41, Inc., announced that it would file for a construction permit of its own to build the station. While Morris began the process to dissolve the BCU-TV partnership, Searer had left to become executive vice president of the new Channel 41, Inc., having moved to sever ties as a result of the decision to sell to West Michigan Telecasters.

The FCC canceled the WWWU-TV construction permit and West Michigan Telecasters's attempt to buy it on September 8, 1969. It then accepted the application of Channel 41, Inc., for filing and gave BCU-TV and other parties 60 days to file. Ten days later, West Michigan Telecasters abandoned its attempt to pursue channel 41 in favor of seeking a relocation of its transmitter to the south. Channel 41, Inc., was the sole applicant for the permit, but the firm's plans continued to depend on whether ABC would grant an affiliation—and, thusly, whether WZZM could move its tower south from Grant to Hudsonville, some 35 miles (56 km) closer to Battle Creek, thereby eliminating the need for another ABC affiliate in southern West Michigan. The FCC denied the tower move in May 1970 to prevent an "adverse impact on UHF development", another victory for backers of the Battle Creek station.

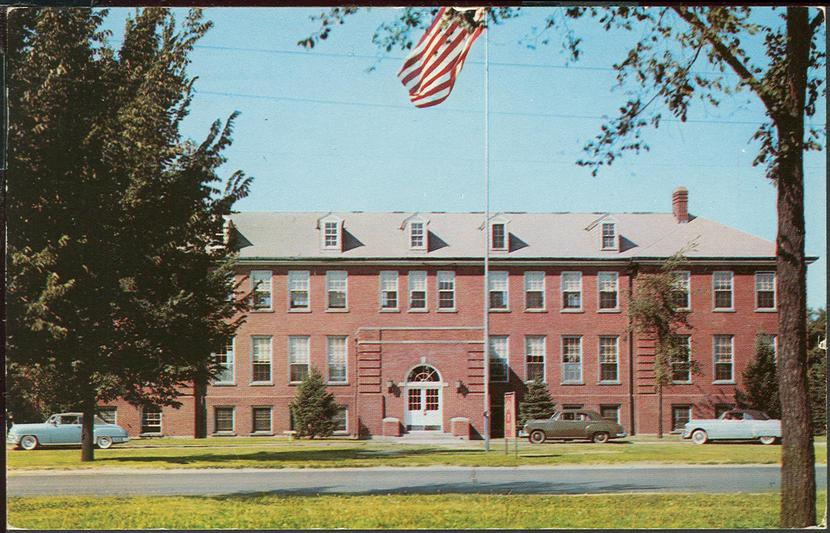
A 1953 postcard of the headquarters building at Fort Custer, which housed channel 41's studios from 1971 to 2006.

Channel 41, Inc., received its construction permit on July 31, 1970. From a list of call sign choices, which the station solicited from viewers, the station selected WUHQ-TV, containing a "U" for UHF and "HQ" for headquarters. At that time, the federal government was turning over surplus land in the Fort Custer Military Reservation to the city of Battle Creek, and the city leased the headquarters building to Channel 41, Inc., with an option to buy; the station made $400,000 in improvements to install its studios and offices in the structure. Meanwhile, negotiations with ABC were not concluded until February 1971 because a to-be-built UHF station in Jackson also sought to be an affiliate.

WUHQ-TV began broadcasting on the afternoon of July 24, 1971; in addition to network programs—obtained through a feed from WZZM-TV—and syndicated shows, there were also several planned local programs, including local news coverage. The station's dependence on WZZM-TV instead of direct network service meant that some ABC programs were not seen on channel 41 because they were not seen in Grand Rapids, but it was far cheaper than the monthly cost of a line from AT&T. WUHQ-TV was placed on channel 4 on the Battle Creek cable system, which dropped WZZM-TV from its lineup at that time; the Grand Rapids station was later restored in 1975, then discontinued in 1986 along with two out-of-market network affiliates.

=== Local newscasts ===
As WUHQ-TV, channel 41 had an on-again, off-again local news lineup. At launch, the station announced 5:30 and 11 p.m. newscasts to be anchored by radio newsman Roger Thurgaland. However, citing technical mishaps and a news department management felt was not prepared, the station switched to airing 5-minute news capsules in the late afternoon and prime time hours; it also added the ABC Evening News to its lineup as both ABC affiliates in the region began to air the program. A 6:30 p.m. evening newscast was later established, but it was scrapped in January 1975 because the owners felt it was too costly and could not adequately compete with the many news programs available on stations broadcast by the local cable system. In 1980, the station brought back a longform evening local newscast in the form of the 15-minute 41 Early Report at 5:45 p.m. This was replaced with a newscast at 6 p.m. in 1982, which was in turn canceled in 1983 to focus efforts on the noon newscast and because of poor ratings against its primary competitor, Kalamazoo-based CBS affiliate WKZO-TV.

A year later, in September 1984, channel 41 returned to the early evening news competition with a 5:30 p.m. newscast, scrapping the noon news program. A 6 p.m. newscast was added in January 1986; it was organized as the more traditional show, with the 5:30 p.m. half-hour given over to more features and later renamed as 41 Alive with Trudy Yarnell. The 6 p.m. news was then canceled in January 1987: whereas WOTV (channel 8) was viewed by 28 percent of households, WZZM 27 percent and WWMT 18 percent, the WUHQ-TV news offering was attracting just 2 percent of local viewers at that hour. 41 Alive moved to 5 p.m. before being canceled itself that July, with the local news staff being repurposed as a documentary unit. In January 1987, the station also dropped ABC World News Tonight in favor of reruns of WKRP in Cincinnati, a decision that was not reversed until July 1989.

Without full-length local news, the station focused on cut-ins during Good Morning America, as well as high school football coverage. In February 1991, Diane King, who had joined the station in 1989 to anchor the news cut-ins and be part of the documentary unit, was fatally shot outside her home, having previously told friends that a man had been harassing her. Her husband, Bradford King, was convicted of murder the next year. The murder was profiled on a 2004 episode of Forensic Files.

=== WZZM merger attempt ===
In 1990, WZZM owner Northstar Television announced it had entered into a merger agreement with Channel 41, Inc. Under the agreement, WUHQ would simulcast WZZM for almost all of the broadcast day, with the exception of split local news programming. John Lawrence, president of WUHQ, said at the time, "It is now appropriate that ABC service in this market be combined." He and his brother, William J. Lawrence, Jr., were to become minority stockholders in Northstar as part of the proposed agreement. The FCC approved the merger in June 1991. According to a filing with the FCC, Northstar intended to air separate news coverage on channel 41 at times when WZZM aired news, though it was unclear how many WUHQ staffers would be retained in the merged operation. However, a planned August closing was delayed.

== Under WOOD-TV management ==
Northstar's inability to close the merger agreement led Channel 41, Inc., to pursue another method of bolstering the station's operation. On October 31, 1991, it announced that it had entered into an 11-year local marketing agreement with WOTV (channel 8) to consolidate operations and restore some evening news coverage. Of WUHQ-TV's 29 existing employees, 14 were laid off, while four employees were added to produce news inserts for the station's 6 and 11 p.m. newscasts. WUHQ-TV then changed its call sign to WOTV on June 1, 1992, when channel 8 became WOOD-TV, reclaiming a call sign it had been forced to change 20 years prior. Under the agreement with Channel 41, Inc., WOTV had its own sales, news, and engineering departments by 2001, while WOOD-TV provided programming support and bookkeeping services.

The news inserts on WOTV grew over time, even as ratings remained low. In 1993, what had been an eight- to ten-minute nightly insert grew to 15 minutes at noon, 6, and 11 p.m., with only weather and sports shared with WOOD-TV. This subsequently evolved into full 6 and 11 p.m. newscasts from Battle Creek by 1995, expanding to weekends in 1996. A local morning news program was also added and extended to an hour in 1999.

In 2001, WOOD-TV owner LIN Television Corporation acquired WOTV outright from Channel 41, Inc., for $2.25 million. It was able to form the duopoly between network affiliates because the station was ranked sixth in the market. The news ratings were equally anemic. In May 2001, Nielsen Media Research figures showed WOOD-TV, WZZM, and WWMT with the top three 6 and 11 p.m. newscasts in West Michigan. WOOD-TV attracted a 25 share—percent of households using TVs—at 6 and 28 percent at 11; WWMT, the primary competitor for Kalamazoo and Battle Creek news, had a 15 share at 6 and 17 at 11. In comparison, WOTV had a 2 share at 6 and a 3 share at 11.

=== Cancellation of local newscasts ===
Citing poor ratings and declining market advertising revenues due to the Iraq War, LIN closed the WOTV newsroom on August 21, 2003, with the final newscasts airing the day prior, and channel 41 began simulcasting 4 1/2 hours a day of newscasts from WOOD-TV, beginning with the 5 p.m. newscast. The conversion of WOTV to a Battle Creek–Kalamazoo bureau for WOOD-TV's news operation led to 24 news personnel being laid off, with just four people remaining to provide news coverage to the WOOD-TV newsroom in Grand Rapids alongside 20 sales, engineering, and office staff. The remaining personnel were consolidated to Grand Rapids in 2006, resulting in three further job cuts and the departure of WOTV features reporter Gerry Barnaby. The Fort Custer headquarters building was then donated to a city entity, Battle Creek Unlimited, and later demolished in February 2014.

The 2000s also saw increased coverage overlap between WOTV and WZZM. Satellite television providers Dish Network and DirecTV began offering both stations across the full market in 2002, and WZZM was readded to several Comcast systems in southwest Michigan, including Battle Creek, in 2009. WZZM continued to receive far higher total-day ratings than WOTV in the market; in 2013, channel 13 had an 8.3 percent total-day share compared to channel 41's 1.9 percent. As a result of this ratings imbalance, the station has adopted unusual marketing strategies. In 2012, it rebranded as "WOTV 4 Women" and refocused its talent and local initiatives around the demographic—an unusual case of a station promoting itself specifically to one gender—after having previously branded as "My ABC".

In 2014, LIN was acquired by Media General. Media General was then acquired by Nexstar Broadcasting Group in 2017. When Nexstar then acquired Tribune Media in 2019, Tribune's WXMI, the Fox affiliate in Grand Rapids, was spun out as part of the sale.

A subchannel of WOTV replaced a subchannel of WWMT as the local outlet for The CW on January 1, 2024. By that time, Nexstar was the majority owner of the network.

In August 2025, Nexstar agreed to acquire WZZM's owner Tegna Inc. for $6.2 billion; WZZM was Tegna's lone Michigan station. The deal was completed on March 19, 2026, after the FCC's Media Bureau waived all existing regulations prohibiting Nexstar from owning more than two full-power stations in one market. A temporary restraining order issued one week later by the U.S. District Court for the Eastern District of California, later escalated to a preliminary injunction, has prevented Nexstar from integrating the stations.

== Technical information ==
=== Subchannels ===
WOTV's transmitter is located on South Norris Road in Orangeville Township. The station's signal is multiplexed:

Subchannels of WOTV
Subchannel	Res.	Short name	Programming
41.1	720p	WOTV	ABC
41.2	1080i	THE CW	The CW
41.3	480i	CHARGE!	Charge!
41.4	480i	COZI	Cozi TV

WOTV is also broadcast in ATSC 3.0 (NextGen TV) on WXSP-CD and WOLP-CD, which converted to the new format in 2021.

=== Analog-to-digital conversion ===
WOTV shut down its analog signal, over UHF channel 41, on June 12, 2009, as part of the federally mandated transition from analog to digital television; it continued to broadcast on channel 20, using virtual channel 41. WOTV was then repacked to channel 17 in 2019.

== See also ==
- Channel 4 branded TV stations in the United States
- Channel 20 digital TV stations in the United States
- Channel 41 virtual TV stations in the United States
