= WZZM =

Television station in Grand Rapids, Michigan

- Grand Rapids–Muskegon, Michigan; United States
- City: Grand Rapids, Michigan
- Channels: Digital: 13 (VHF); Virtual: 13
- Branding: 13 On Your Side

Programming
- Affiliations: 13.1: ABC; for others, see § Subchannels

Ownership
- Owner: Tegna Inc., a subsidiary of Nexstar Media Group; (Combined Communications of Oklahoma, LLC)
- Sister stations: Nexstar: WOOD-TV, WOTV, WXSP-CD

History
- First air date: November 1, 1962
- Former channel numbers: Analog: 13 (VHF, 1962–2009); Digital: 39 (UHF, 2002–2009)
- Call sign meaning: "WZZM" forms an ambigram

Technical information
- Licensing authority: FCC
- Facility ID: 49713
- ERP: 24.5 kW
- HAAT: 324.3 m (1,064 ft)
- Transmitter coordinates: 43°18′35″N 85°54′45″W

Links
- Public license information: Public file; LMS
- Website: www.wzzm13.com

WZZM (channel 13) is a television station licensed to Grand Rapids, Michigan, United States, serving West Michigan as an affiliate of ABC. It is owned by the Tegna subsidiary of Nexstar Media Group; Nexstar also owns WOOD-TV (channel 8), WXSP-CD (channel 15), and WOTV (channel 41). WZZM's studios are located on 3 Mile Road NW in Walker (with a Grand Rapids mailing address), and its transmitter is located in Grant, Michigan.

Channel 13 was inserted into Grand Rapids in 1961; station spacing rules of the time required that the transmitter be to the north of the city, closer to Muskegon. The station went on the air in November 1962 under interim operating authority; four companies jointly owned the station until West Michigan Telecasters was granted the permanent license in 1964 and bought out the others' interim holdings in 1965. Because of the transmitter site restriction, the station did not and does not provide adequate coverage of the southern portion of the market, namely Kalamazoo and Battle Creek. In the late 1960s and early 1970s, the station sought translators to serve those cities, only to have the proposals turned down to protect a new station on channel 41 in Battle Creek, WUHQ-TV, which also broadcasts ABC but with separate non-network programming. An attempt to combine WZZM-TV and WUHQ-TV failed in 1991 and WUHQ became WOTV, commonly operated and later co-owned with WOOD-TV. Satellite television providers Dish Network and DirecTV provide both stations across the entire market, and WZZM is also on cable in Battle Creek.

In local news, the station had a highly regarded news department from the 1960s through the 1980s; its original news director stayed on for the first 25 years of its history. While the station continues to be competitive, particularly in the Grand Rapids area northward, coverage shortfalls in the south and the aggregate nature of the television market have made WOOD-TV the overall market news leader since the 1990s. The station maintains a lit weather ball displayed near its Walker studios. Gannett acquired WZZM in 1996 as part of a multi-market asset swap to complete their merger with Multimedia, Inc.; Gannett reorganized their broadcast holdings in 2015 as Tegna Inc. In 2026, Nexstar Media Group—the owner of WOOD-TV and WOTV—acquired Tegna.

== History ==
=== Assignment of channel 13 to Grand Rapids; construction ===
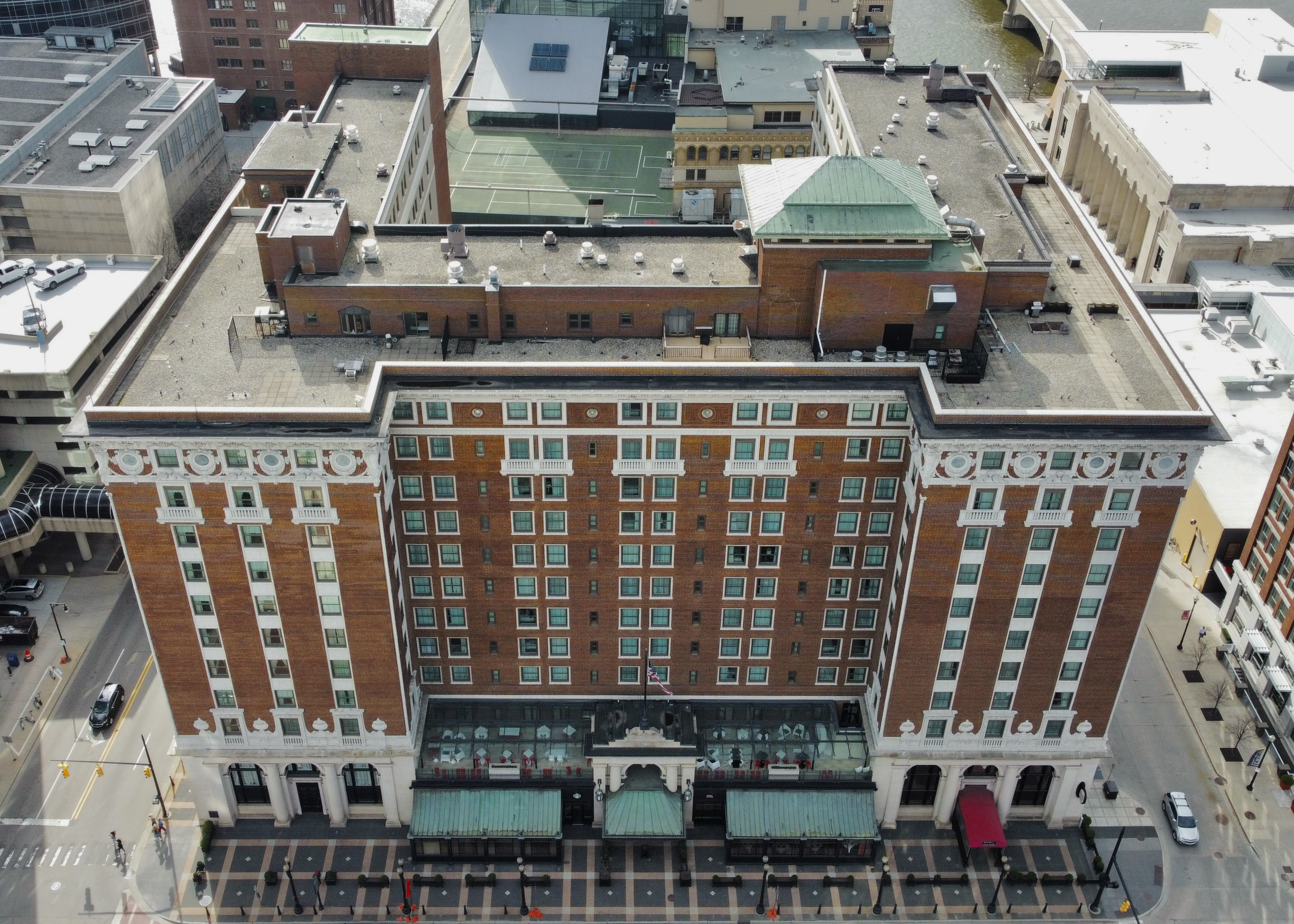
The Pantlind Hotel in downtown Grand Rapids was the first studio location for WZZM.

In 1959, the Atlas Broadcasting Company was organized to pursue the addition of a third very high frequency (VHF) station in West Michigan. It applied to the Federal Communications Commission (FCC), proposing the addition of channel 13 to Grand Rapids. The station would transmit from an area near Muskegon, north of Grand Rapids, where it would be appropriately spaced to WSPD-TV in Toledo, Ohio, and WREX-TV in Rockford, Illinois; FCC regulations required the transmitter to be located at least 170 miles (274 km) from competing stations on that frequency. Atlas also proposed moving WWTV in Cadillac to channel 9, where it would still be appropriately spaced to CKLW-TV in Windsor, Ontario. The FCC approved this allocation change in 1961; it replaced channel 9 in Alpena with channel 6. The placement of the channel at Grand Rapids attracted interest even before the insertion was final. By the end of 1960, three groups had incorporated with an eye toward filing for channel 13, including West Michigan Telecasters—consisting of 24 shareholders with Lewis V. Chamberlain, Jr. as president—whose final application was filed in October 1961. One of the shareholders was L. William Seidman, then on the board of directors of Grand Valley State College and later chairman of the Federal Deposit Insurance Corporation. Some of the stockholders were from Muskegon; the group promoted the northerly transmitter site as a bonus, noting that there were no local stations in Muskegon and that other communities such as Grand Haven and Holland were also underserved. West Michigan was one of six applicants to file by the end of 1961, alongside Atlas (which also owned Grand Rapids–area radio station WMAX); Grand Broadcasting Company, which counted former WLAV and WLAV-TV owner Leonard Versluis among its stockholders as well as former FCC counsel Mary Jane Morris; Major Television Company; MKO Broadcasting Company; and Peninsular Broadcasting Company.

In its order assigning channel 13 to Grand Rapids, the FCC indicated its willingness to accept proposals for interim operating authority to hasten the construction of the station. This meant that the comparative hearing process and construction would run in parallel. Days after filing its permanent bid, West Michigan Telecasters also proposed interim operating authority. Major and Atlas both withdrew in August 1962; the four remaining contenders formed Channel 13, Grand Rapids, Inc., which received interim authority that same month. The interim station originally chose the call letters WIIM-TV, but WJIM-TV in Lansing objected, resulting in the choice of WZZM as the call sign. Construction rapidly proceeded, and from studios in the Pantlind Hotel downtown, WZZM made its first broadcast on November 1, 1962, an ABC affiliate from the start.

While WZZM was on the air, the applicants wrangled at the FCC over permanent authority to run it. In May 1963, an FCC hearing examiner gave Grand Broadcasting Company the nod in his initial decision, citing its superior integration of ownership and management, a comparative criterion analyzing the involvement of owners in station operations. The FCC itself, however, instead selected West Michigan Telecasters in April 1964, citing its principals' involvement in civic affairs and research into local public service programming. The company then settled with the other applicants, ultimately paying them between $360,000 and $390,000 apiece, and on January 25, 1965, it became the sole owner of WZZM. After the award, West Michigan Telecasters proceeded with its plans to build a studio in Muskegon.

After a plan to merge with Basic Communications Inc. and Eccentric magazine in Birmingham, Michigan, fell through, West Michigan Telecasters merged with two publishing companies in 1969 to form Synercom Communications Corporation. In 1971, WZZM-TV finally left the Pantlind and moved to purpose-built studios. The 38,500-square-foot (3,580 m^{2}) facility also housed WZZM-FM, which West Michigan Telecasters had acquired in 1966, and the station's production arm. Synercom then spun West Michigan Telecasters and the WZZM stations out as its own company in 1973, including Elinor Bunin Productions, a New York City film production house.

=== Wometco and Price ownership ===
West Michigan Telecasters entered into an agreement to sell WZZM-TV to Wometco Enterprises for $14 million in 1976, with WZZM-TV becoming Wometco's fourth television property. The acquisition closed in January 1978; WZZM-FM was split from the television station by West Michigan Telecasters and sold to separate interests. Wometco was then taken private in a leveraged buyout by Kohlberg Kravis Roberts (KKR) in 1984.

KKR then sold the station to Price Communications, owned by Robert Price, in 1985; the deal was the largest acquisition for the company to date. Price then sold its four stations to Northstar Television Group in 1989 for $70 million; Northstar was a joint venture of Osborn Television and Desai Capital, the largest stakeholder in Price. Three of Northstar's four stations were acquired by Argyle Television Holdings II in 1994; the original Argyle Television had been sold earlier in the year.

=== Gannett/Tegna ownership ===
In 1996, the Gannett Company acquired Multimedia, Inc.. This created conflicts for the company in Cincinnati and Oklahoma City, where Multimedia had a newspaper-TV station combination and a TV station-cable system combination that were not permissible under FCC rules of the time. As a result, Gannett agreed to a trade with Argyle. Gannett sent Argyle the Cincinnati and Oklahoma City stations (WLWT and KOCO-TV) in exchange for $20 million; WGRZ in Buffalo, New York; and WZZM-TV. In 1999, after a 33-year run, the station ceased producing its local children's show, Bozo's Big Top.

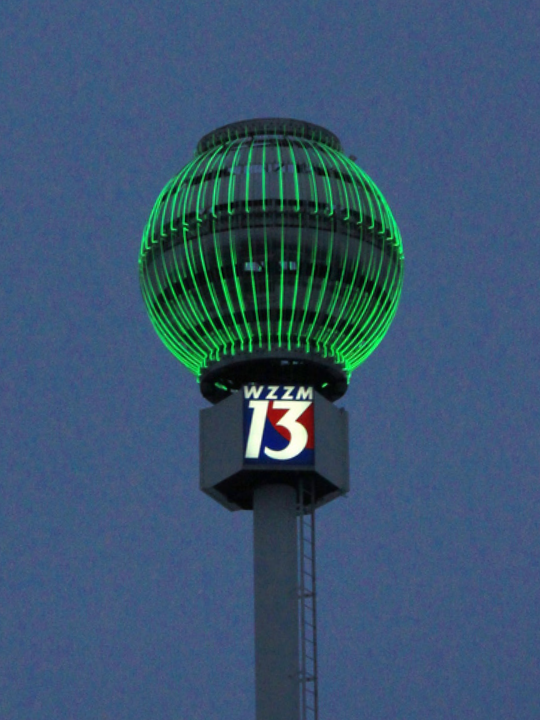
The WZZM 13 Weatherball

From 1967 to 1987, a weather ball sat atop the Michigan National Bank building in Grand Rapids, using 288 colored neon lights to convey forecast precipitation or changes in temperature, until it was removed because its weight had caused structural damage. The station located the stainless steel ball in a scrapyard in Kalamazoo in 1999 and applied to authorities in Walker to mount a 100-foot (30 m) pole to display it near its studios in 2002. New neon tubes were fitted atop the restored weather ball, which returned to service in 2003.

On June 29, 2015, the Gannett Company split in two, with one side specializing in print media and the other side specializing in broadcast and digital media. WZZM was retained by the latter company, named Tegna.

=== Nexstar ownership ===
In August 2025, Nexstar Media Group agreed to acquire Tegna for $6.2 billion. In Grand Rapids, Nexstar already owned WOOD-TV, WOTV, and WXSP-CD. The deal was completed on March 19, 2026, and included approval from the FCC's Media Bureau for Nexstar to own three full-power station licenses in markets such as Grand Rapids. A temporary restraining order issued one week later by the U.S. District Court for the Eastern District of California, later escalated to a preliminary injunction, has prevented Nexstar from integrating the stations.

== The Battle Creek–Kalamazoo problem ==
WZZM's transmitter is farther north than most stations in the market, and its signal (contour map pictured) does not cover Battle Creek or Kalamazoo.

The FCC reckoned channel 13 as a Grand Rapids–Kalamazoo station when it inserted the allocation. On paper, the sign-on of WZZM gave West Michigan full service from all three networks. The market was already served by Grand Rapids–based NBC affiliate WOOD-TV and Kalamazoo-based CBS affiliate WKZO-TV. Both stations had recently moved their transmitters to Barry County, halfway between Grand Rapids and Kalamazoo, to provide primary coverage to both cities. However, the spacing restrictions imposed on the channel 13 allocation did not allow WZZM to follow suit, and it had to build its transmitter further north than its competitors. When WZZM signed on, the northerly location required to insert channel 13 into the area left much of the market's southern portion without even a fringe signal from the station. Bill Tompkins of The Battle Creek Enquirer and News wrote that local viewers found WZZM "about as elusive as a flying saucer" when it began broadcasting. While WZZM officials insisted that Battle Creek was firmly within its service area, only a "small and lucky" few viewers received a watchable signal from channel 13, and Kalamazoo viewers likewise reported getting only marginal coverage at best from WZZM. Since WOOD-TV and WKZO-TV removed ABC programs from their schedules when WZZM came into service, viewers in this area had to depend on part-time carriage of ABC programs by the stations in the Lansing–Jackson market. In 1964, WZZM was authorized to construct a translator on channel 12 in Kalamazoo, and the next year, it applied to build one on channel 83 in Battle Creek. This was simultaneous with Mary Jane Morris, who had been involved with one of the losing bids for channel 13, filing with James Searer to build a full-service station in Battle Creek on channel 65. That translator went on the air on channel 74 in January 1968, but the FCC then ordered it to cease broadcasting in early March in the context of a battle with the permittee for a full-power station on Battle Creek's channel 41. The commission expressed concern that the WZZM translator could be detrimental to the establishment of the proposed full-service station. This was particularly acute because the channel 41 permittee, BCU-TV, proposed to affiliate with ABC, while WZZM-TV contended it had the rights to ABC in the Battle Creek area. West Michigan Telecasters reached a deal with BCU-TV to buy the channel 41 permit in October 1968.

However, that same week, a second local group, Channel 41, Inc., filed a competing application to propose a local station, with Searer defecting from BCU-TV to become one of its leaders. The FCC canceled BCU-TV's construction permit and West Michigan Telecasters's attempt to buy it on September 8, 1969. It then accepted the application of Channel 41, Inc., for filing; ten days later, West Michigan Telecasters abandoned its attempt to pursue channel 41 in favor of seeking a relocation of its transmitter from Grant to Hudsonville, improving the signal in Kalamazoo and Battle Creek. However, the spacing considerations that resulted in the northerly location of WZZM in the first place were an insurmountable obstacle; the FCC denied the proposal because it would have been too close to the channel 13 station in Toledo.

Channel 41, Inc., received its construction permit in July 1970 and went on the air as WUHQ-TV on July 24, 1971. The Battle Creek cable system removed WZZM-TV from its lineup to accommodate the new ABC affiliate; in spite of the competition, WUHQ-TV depended on WZZM to receive ABC network programming. The FCC then ordered WZZM-TV to cease using its Kalamazoo translator on February 7, 1972. WZZM-TV was restored to Battle Creek cable in 1975 over objections from WUHQ-TV, then discontinued in 1986 along with two out-of-market network affiliates.

In 1990, WZZM owner Northstar Television announced it had entered into a merger agreement with Channel 41, Inc., the owner of WUHQ-TV, which would have seen WUHQ-TV and WZZM share almost all programming with the exception of split local news programming. John Lawrence, president of WUHQ, said at the time, "It is now appropriate that ABC service in this market be combined." The FCC approved the merger in June 1991, with Northstar announcing a plan to continue airing separate news coverage, but a planned August closing was delayed and never took place. WUHQ-TV's owners then signed an agreement for WOTV (channel 8) to provide news coverage for channel 41, part of an 11-year time brokerage agreement in which WOTV assumed many of the station's operating functions but not ownership. WUHQ-TV then changed its call sign to WOTV in June 1992 when WOTV became WOOD-TV.

Dish Network began offering local channel service in the market in 2002 and offers WZZM and WOTV in all areas. WZZM was readded to several Comcast systems in southwest Michigan, including Battle Creek, in 2009.

== News operation ==
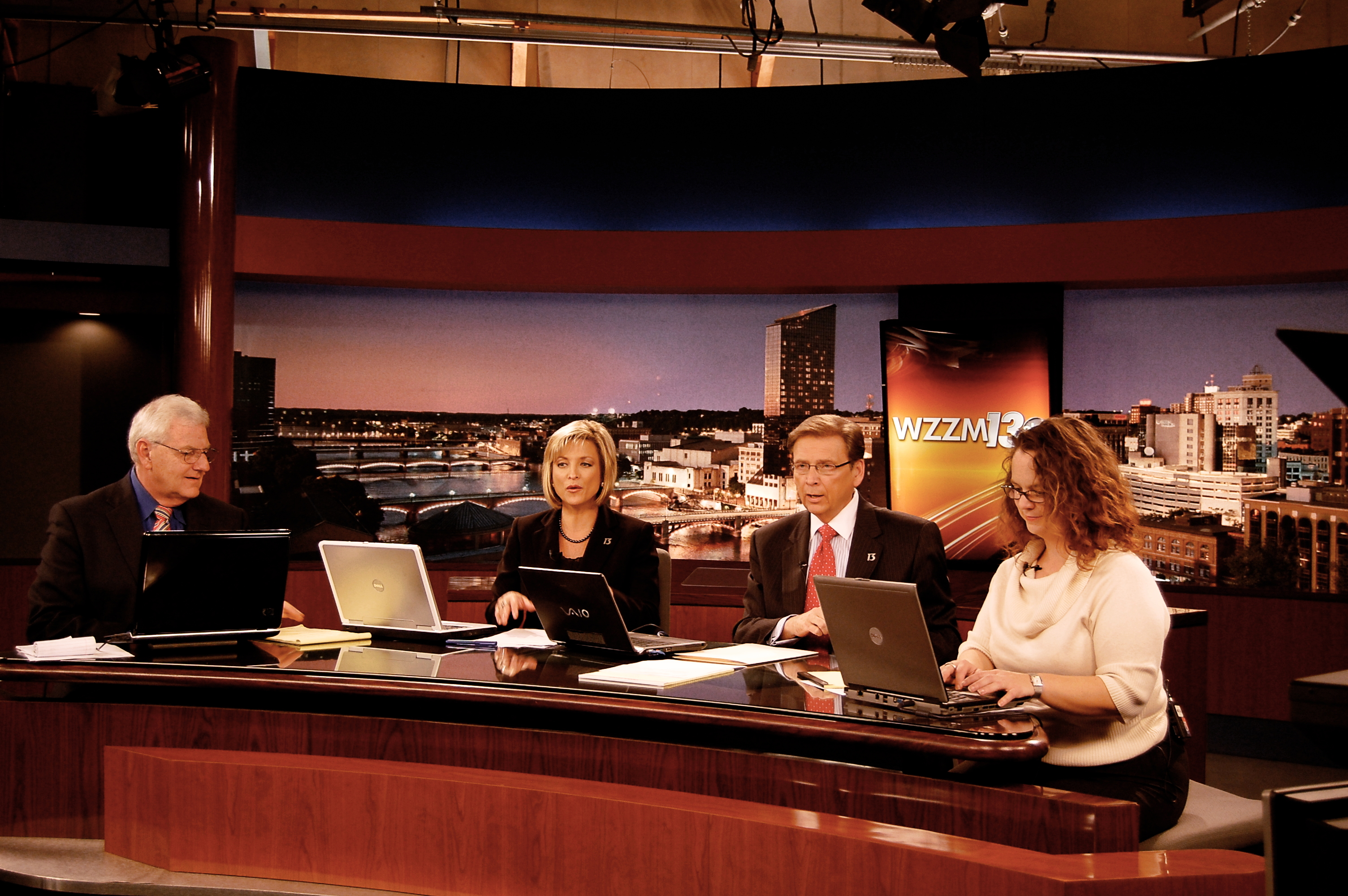
On the set of WZZM's newscasts in 2008

WZZM's original news director, Jack Hogan—who was the first voice heard on the station when it started—held the post for more than 25 years until Price Communications owner Robert Price fired him in February 1988. During Hogan's tenure, the station was a stop on the careers of journalists including sportscaster John Keating (known as Steve Knight in Grand Rapids), future Detroit Free Press executive editor Kurt Luedtke, and reporters Jay Schadler and Martha Teichner. In spite of its coverage shortfalls, WZZM was West Michigan's revenue leader for most of its history through the 1980s. In the late 1970s, it surpassed WOTV (channel 8) in local news viewership for the first time, becoming the regular number-one by the early 1980s. It was nationally respected: the Associated Press said in 1980 that "WZZM has a quality news operation that should be the envy of many stations in larger markets", while it won six straight "News Station of the Year" honors within Michigan from United Press International. After the Price purchase, the station experienced several high-profile defections to other stations. Hogan's firing came less than two weeks after the 1988 Michigan Republican presidential caucus. Price, a Republican, demanded information on delegate counts; from New York City, he ordered Hogan out of bed and to station offices to keep him informed until 3 a.m., accused the station's staff of poor reporting despite not having seen its coverage, and threatened to fire the entire news department.

The 1990s brought changes to the newsroom. The station debuted an hour-long morning news program in 1992 and a 5:30 p.m. newscast in February 1993. However, WOOD-TV became the news leader in the highly fragmented market: though WZZM-TV was stronger within the immediate Grand Rapids area, WOOD's availability in the Kalamazoo–Battle Creek area more than offset the Muskegon and northern area coverage unique to channel 13. WOOD-TV's sales manager likened the advertising sales power of his competitor to "a vehicle with two wheels" because of its inability to cover the full market. Another obstacle, particularly with older viewers, was that WOOD-TV predated WZZM in Grand Rapids by more than a decade. In 2016, WZZM added eight and a half hours a week of new newscasts, including morning and noon news extensions and a 5 p.m. newscast.

In 2004, the station debuted a 5 p.m. talk show, Take Five Grand Rapids. The program was originally produced outside the news department, mixing features and sponsored segments. The show was moved to 4:30 p.m., retitled Take Five & Company, and then moved to an hour at 9 a.m. in 2008. It was replaced with a new hour-long program known as My West Michigan in 2015. The program was put on a continuing hiatus in July 2020 because of COVID-19-related restrictions that made the show's format unworkable.

=== Notable former on-air staff ===
- Anne Doyle – news and sports reporter/anchor, 1973–1977
- John Keating – sports anchor, early 1980s, known at WZZM as Steve Knight
- Martha Teichner – reporter, early 1970s

== Technical information ==
=== Subchannels ===
WZZM is broadcast from a tower in Grant, Michigan. The station's signal is multiplexed:

Subchannels of WZZM
| Subchannel | Res. | Short name | Programming |
|---|---|---|---|
| 13.1 | 720p | WZZM 13 | ABC |
| 13.2 | 480i | WX | On Target Weather |
| 13.3 | 480i | Crime | True Crime Network |
| 13.4 | 480i | Quest | Quest |
| 13.5 | 480i | The365 | 365BLK |
| 13.6 | 480i | Outlaw | Outlaw |
| 13.7 | 480i | QVC | QVC |
| 13.8 | 480i | ShopLC | Shop LC (soon) |
| 13.9 | 480i | StartTV | Start TV |

=== Analog-to-digital conversion ===
WZZM shut down its analog signal, over VHF channel 13, on June 12, 2009, as part of the federally mandated transition from analog to digital television. The station's digital signal relocated from its pre-transition UHF channel 39 to VHF channel 13.
