= WWMT =

Television station in Kalamazoo, Michigan

- Kalamazoo–Grand Rapids–; Battle Creek, Michigan; United States
- City: Kalamazoo, Michigan
- Channels: Digital: 8 (VHF); Virtual: 3
- Branding: News Channel 3; ARC West Michigan (3.2)

Programming
- Affiliations: 3.1: CBS; 3.2: Independent; for others, see § Subchannels

Ownership
- Owner: Sinclair Broadcast Group; (WWMT Licensee, LLC)

History
- First air date: June 1, 1950
- Former call signs: WKZO-TV (1950–1985)
- Former channel numbers: Analog: 3 (VHF, 1950–2009); Digital: 2 (VHF, until 2009)
- Former affiliations: DuMont (secondary, 1950–1955); NBC (secondary, 1950–1960); ABC (secondary, 1950–1962); The CW (3.2, 2006–2023)
- Call sign meaning: We're West Michigan Television

Technical information
- Licensing authority: FCC
- Facility ID: 74195
- ERP: 25 kW
- HAAT: 317 m (1,040 ft)
- Transmitter coordinates: 42°37′56″N 85°32′16″W

Links
- Public license information: Public file; LMS
- Website: wwmt.com

WWMT (channel 3) is a television station licensed to Kalamazoo, Michigan, United States, serving West Michigan as an affiliate of CBS. The station is owned by Sinclair Broadcast Group and maintains studios on West Maple Street in Kalamazoo; its transmitter is located north of Gun Lake, along M-179.

WWMT went on the air on June 1, 1950, as WKZO-TV. Owned by John Fetzer alongside WKZO radio in Kalamazoo, the station was a CBS affiliate from shortly after its first telecast—though it aired various programs from other networks as late as 1962—and the second television station on the air in West Michigan. WKZO-TV expanded into local news in 1953; its coverage generally lagged behind the other stations, though its strongest ratings were in the southern portion of the market that included Kalamazoo.

Fetzer sold his remaining TV stations to Gillett Communications in 1985, and channel 3 changed its call sign to WWMT that December. Under Gillett and Busse Broadcasting, a management buyout of five smaller-market Gillett stations, the station became more competitive not only in the Kalamazoo area but in the broader media market as it invested in its newscasts, improving equipment and adding morning coverage. After two years of ownership by Granite Broadcasting, Freedom Communications acquired WWMT in 1998. Under Freedom, the station launched a subchannel affiliated with The CW in 2006. Sinclair acquired the Freedom TV stations in 2012.

== History ==
=== Early years ===
The Fetzer Broadcasting Company filed an application on May 12, 1948, seeking to build a television station in Kalamazoo, and the Federal Communications Commission (FCC) granted a construction permit to Fetzer on July 29. WKZO-TV began broadcasting its first test signals on April 6, 1950, from a transmitter near Plainwell, and by May it was telecasting slide and film programs on a test basis. The station began airing regular programs on June 1, 1950, and network programming on July 9 as the 20th primary affiliate of CBS; network programs were received from WJBK-TV in Detroit and microwaved across the state. The CBS affiliation matched Fetzer's WKZO radio station in Kalamazoo. In addition to CBS, the station aired some programming from NBC and the DuMont Television Network. In 1953, the station upgraded its effective radiated power to 80,000 watts after WTMJ-TV in Milwaukee moved from channel 3 to channel 4, followed by a second increase to 100,000 watts in 1954. WKZO-TV was the second television station in West Michigan and the fifth in the state, coming on the air less than a year after WLAV-TV (channel 7, now WOOD-TV on channel 8) began in August 1949 from Grand Rapids. The owner of Fetzer Broadcasting Company, John Fetzer, later recalled, "I was broke when I decided to get into television" and that his attorney and wife were skeptical of the new medium's prospects. To help finance the station, Fetzer bartered for the use of equipment from manufacturer Federal Telephone and Radio Corporation in exchange for being used in Federal promotional materials. Early local programs included agricultural and women's programs as well as sponsored soapbox derby races. Another long-running program was the children's show Channel 3 Clubhouse, which debuted in 1956 and ran as a daily feature before moving to weekends in 1984.

Originally sharing studios with WKZO radio in the Burdick Hotel, which was billed as "Block Long Radio City", in 1956, Fetzer announced the acquisition of land and a building at Maple Street and Crosstown Parkway to build new studios for WKZO-TV. The WKZO stations moved into Broadcast House, a renovated Chrysler-Plymouth dealership, in June 1958. It featured two television studios and a studio designed for simulcast radio and television programs. In 1961, WKZO-TV moved its transmitter from its original site near Plainwell to a more northerly site in Barry County, near Gun Lake. WKZO-TV and sister radio station WJEF-FM began operating from a 1,130-foot (340 m) tower, roughly 4 miles (6.4 km) south of a new tower for WOOD-TV. The new tower gave channel 3 primary coverage of Grand Rapids. With new equipment for WKZO-TV, Fetzer was able to repurpose the power amplifiers he had originally used for channel 3 for his FM station, allowing it to ramp up to 500,000 watts. Fetzer was spurred to move channel 3's tower to Barry County, halfway between Kalamazoo and Grand Rapids, after WOOD-TV made plans to move its transmitter there.

The next year, the station—which had carried selected ABC programs—dropped them when WZZM-TV (channel 13) signed on from Grand Rapids. In 1956, Fetzer was part of an 11-member group that bought the Detroit Tigers baseball team, becoming the sole owner in 1962. Fetzer had initially become involved to protect the rights to broadcast the club on his stations; channel 3 remained the West Michigan affiliate for the Tigers television network through 1995.

WKZO-TV debuted its first newscast on April 5, 1953, with Hugh Harper as the first anchorman. The WKZO radio and television news operations were combined; for instance, Karl Guenther was the farm director for radio and produced an agricultural TV show, Michigan Reports.

However, under Fetzer's stewardship, its record in local news coverage left much to be desired. In 1973, FCC commissioner Nicholas Johnson claimed WKZO-TV ranked in the bottom 10 among 140 stations in the top 50 television markets in the percentage of airtime devoted to news and public affairs programming. He also ranked channel 3 as the worst station surveyed for hiring minorities and for paying minorities. Carl Lee, the general manager for the WKZO stations, vehemently disputed Johnson's accusations about minority hiring, claiming that minorities made up five percent of its staff even though it was based in a county that was over 95 percent white at the time. He also pointed out that the WKZO stations had offered scholarships to minority students at Western Michigan University since 1968.

In 1981, WKZO established microwave facilities to provide live transmission of news material from Grand Rapids to Kalamazoo, based at the studios of its FM sister station (then known as WJFM). Previously, reporters had to drive an hour in order to get tapes for stories in the market's northern portion to Broadcast House in time for newscasts. For some time, the station's newsgathering efforts in that part of the market relied on freelance reporters and photographers. Also in 1981, the station debuted a 6 p.m. Saturday newscast and a redesigned set. By 1985, despite being the only West Michigan station with bureaus in Kalamazoo, Grand Rapids, and Battle Creek, WKZO was still in third place in overall market ratings. While it was in first place in Kalamazoo proper, it was second in Kalamazoo and Calhoun counties behind WOTV. Even with the changes made in the first half of the 1980s, channel 3's news operation was often the butt of jokes in West Michigan.

=== Gillett and Busse ownership ===
After 35 years of ownership, in August 1985, Fetzer announced the sale of WKZO-TV—as well as KOLN and KGIN-TV in central Nebraska and KMEG in Sioux City, Iowa—to Gillett Communications of Nashville, Tennessee. WKZO radio remained with Fetzer, and as a result, the call sign for WKZO-TV changed to WWMT when Gillett took over on December 5, 1985. Gillett canceled Channel 3 Clubhouse, whose tapings interfered with the production of local newscasts, and Accent, the long-running news and features program descended from the station's Feminine Fancies of the 1950s. The new owner set out to bolster the news department. It hired John Lansing from WAVE in Louisville, Kentucky, to serve as WWMT's news director, invested $1 million into technical improvements, and upgraded the station's syndicated programming inventory. Barry Shanley, a Kalamazoo native who was longtime anchor at WZZM, moved to the same role at channel 3. Lansing instituted morning news meetings and daily critiques of newscasts. He also hired a full staff of photographers. Previously, channel 3's staffers had been "one-man bands" burdened with shooting and editing their own stories, shooting their colleagues' stories, and reporting stories on WKZO radio.

In 1987, Gillett conducted a buyout of Storer Communications. With this acquisition, Gillett now had 14 stations, more than the limit of 12 then in place. Five of Gillett's smaller stations, including WWMT, were spun off to a new company, Busse Broadcasting Corporation—which was run by and named for Lawrence A. Busse, the former general manager of WEAU-TV in Eau Claire, Wisconsin, one of the stations included in the transaction. Busse Broadcasting was originally announced to be owned by Lawrence Busse and a trust set up for George N. Gillett Jr.'s children; the FCC rejected complaints from members of Congress after Gillett himself bought non-voting stock in the company. Busse Broadcasting was headquartered in Kalamazoo. By the time Lansing departed for KARE in Minneapolis in 1988, WWMT was again number-one in its home area and a more competitive third-place outlet in the larger media market.

WWMT began airing a morning newscast in 1989. This was followed by the institution of weekday noon and weekend morning newscasts in 1992, and a 5:30 p.m. newscast in 1994.

=== Granite and Freedom ownership ===
In January 1995, Granite Broadcasting agreed to acquire WWMT from Busse for $95 million. The company took over in June, and in March 1996, it fired manager Gil Buettner and replaced him with Dick Appleton, who had owned WZZM under the aegis of Northstar Television Group until 1995. At the time, channel 3 was close to being tied with WZZM for second in news ratings. Later that year, Granite was contracted by Joel Ferguson to run WLAJ, the ABC affiliate in Lansing, with management duties for WLAJ moving to Kalamazoo. Granite did not immediately buy WLAJ, valued at $19.4 million, outright because of the signal overlap between the Lansing and Kalamazoo stations. Several staff, including anchor Joe Parker, were transferred from Kalamazoo to Lansing to reinitiate a news department there.

Granite agreed to acquire KOFY-TV in San Francisco in late 1997. To fund the purchase, the company opted to sell WWMT and WLAJ to Freedom Communications for a total of $170 million, with the deal closing that July.

On April 4, 2006, WWMT announced it would affiliate with The CW on a new digital subchannel. The subchannel was known as CW7, as it aired on channel 7 on some local cable systems. A 10 p.m. newscast debuted on CW7 in February 2008.

Under Freedom, WWMT continued to provide services to WLAJ. Some WLAJ operations moved to WWMT in 2005, and when WLAJ discontinued longform local newscasts in 2009, WWMT continued to provide limited news breaks and weather to the Lansing station.

=== Sinclair ownership ===
Freedom Communications announced on November 2, 2011, that it would exit from television and sell its stations, including WWMT, to the Sinclair Broadcast Group. Sinclair operated the stations beginning on December 1, 2011, and the deal formally closed in April 2012. Ties with the Lansing station were cut, as Sinclair sold WLAJ to Shield Media; Shield entered into an agreement with Lansing's WLNS-TV, and in 2013, WLAJ began airing that station's news programming.

Sinclair provided a cash infusion to WWMT, whose news operation had languished during Freedom's bankruptcy. Less than a month after Sinclair closed on ownership, the morning newscast was extended to a 4:30 a.m. start. The company reinstated weekend morning newscasts, invested in new newsgathering equipment, and extended the 10 p.m. CW newscast from 30 minutes to an hour.

On May 8, 2017, Sinclair entered into an agreement to acquire Chicago-based Tribune Media, owner of Fox affiliate WXMI (channel 17). FCC rules of the time precluded Sinclair from simultaneously owning WWMT and WXMI, two of the four highest-rated stations. Though WXMI was later earmarked for divestiture, the overall deal was terminated in August 2018 after the FCC designated it for administrative hearing.

In April 2023, WWMT was the subject of a bomb threat when a person entered the station and claimed to an employee that he had a bomb on him. The station was safely evacuated and the suspect surrendered within three hours. The station remained closed off after the suspect was arrested due to a backpack that the person brought in. By that year, WWMT was in second place across the day in news ratings.

The CW affiliation moved to WOTV 41.2 on January 1, 2024. As such, the subchannel became an independent, rebranded as "ARC West Michigan".

=== Notable former on-air staff ===
- Lee Cowan – anchor, 1990s
- Kraig Kann – sportscaster, 1991–1995
- Kyung Lah – reporter, 1994–1995
- Joe Parker – anchor, 1990s
- Jeff Varner – morning and evening news anchor, 2007–2012

== Technical information ==
=== Subchannels ===
WWMT is broadcast from a transmitter north of Gun Lake, Michigan, along M-179. The station's signal is multiplexed:

Subchannels of WWMT
Subchannel	Res.	Short name	Programming
3.1	1080i	CBS	CBS
3.2	1080i	Ind	Independent
3.3	480i	ROAR	Roar
3.4	480i	CHSN	Chicago Sports Network
15.3	480i	Comet	Comet (WXSP-CD)

Broadcast on behalf of another station

=== Analog-to-digital conversion ===
WWMT shut down its analog signal on June 12, 2009, as part of the digital television transition. The station's digital signal moved from channel 2 to channel 8 for post-transition operations.

== See also ==
- Channel 3 virtual TV stations in the United States
- Channel 8 digital TV stations in the United States
