= WUDT-LD =

Television station in Detroit

- Detroit, Michigan; United States
- Channels: Digital: 8 (VHF); Virtual: 23

Programming
- Affiliations: 23.1: Daystar; 23.2: Daystar Español; 23.3: Daystar Reflections

Ownership
- Owner: Daystar Television Network; (Word of God Fellowship, Inc.)

History
- First air date: January 4, 1989
- Former call signs: W05BN (1989–1995); WBXD-LP (1995–2002); WBXD-CA (2002–2004); WUDT-CA (2004–2010); WUDT-LD (2010–2012); WUDT-CD (2012–2013)
- Former channel numbers: Analog: 5 (VHF, 1989–January 2001), 35 (UHF, January–July 2001), 23 (UHF, July 2001–2010); Digital: 8 (VHF, 2010–2012), 23 (UHF, 2012–2022)
- Former affiliations: The Box (1989–2000); MTV2 (2000–2004); Univision (2004–2009)
- Call sign meaning: Univision Detroit (former affiliation)

Technical information
- Licensing authority: FCC
- Facility ID: 70421
- Class: LD
- ERP: 3 kW
- HAAT: 219.1 m (719 ft)
- Transmitter coordinates: 42°26′52.2″N 83°10′23.1″W

Links
- Public license information: LMS
- Website: www.daystar.com

WUDT-LD (channel 23) is a low-power religious television station in Detroit, Michigan, United States, owned by the Daystar Television Network. The station's transmitter is located at 8 Mile and Meyers Road in suburban Oak Park.

== History ==
The station took to the air on January 4, 1989, as low-power W05BN on channel 5. It then became WBXD-LP on September 1, 1995, reflecting its affiliation with, and ownership by, The Box, which was acquired by Viacom in 1999 and merged into its MTV2 in 2001. The sale to Viacom put WBXD under the same ownership as UPN station WKBD (channel 50) and, after Viacom's merger with CBS, WWJ-TV (channel 62).

On January 30, 2001, the station moved to channel 35 and then to channel 23 on July 12, 2001. Then on June 27, 2002, the station began operating at class A status, giving it the call sign WBXD-CA.

WUDT's logo as "Univision Detroit"

Viacom sold WBXD-CA to Equity Broadcasting in November 2004. The new owners renamed the station WUDT-CA, and made the station an affiliate of Univision. In 2007, Equity Broadcasting was renamed Equity Media Holdings Corporation. WUDT-CA was the first Spanish-language television station to take to the air in the state of Michigan since W66BV, Detroit's prior Univision affiliate, became a TBN translator in the early-1990s.

During its time with Univision, WUDT was also one of only three stations affiliated with the network (along with KUNS-TV in Seattle and Univision O&O WQHS-TV in Cleveland) in markets bordering Canada. Univision's over-the-air presence in Detroit made Detroit/Windsor the only market in the United States or Canada with terrestrial stations in English, Spanish and French—the French station was Radio-Canada owned-and-operated station CBEFT on channel 35, a former originating station which rebroadcast Toronto's CBLFT-DT before going dark in 2012.

WUDT's master control was remotely originated via satellite from Equity's headquarters in Little Rock, Arkansas. Equity maintained a local news and advertising sales office at 5600 King Street in Troy. The station had limited backup signal transmission arrangements; during several instances of bad weather, WUDT-CA often broadcast either a black screen or a "NO SIGNAL" message.

On March 28, 2007, Comcast added WUDT to its Detroit lineup on channel 65, replacing the network's national East Coast feed, which had been carried since the 1980s when Comcast in the Detroit area was split up between several companies (for example, it was known as Barden Cablevision in Detroit proper and Inkster; Cablevision Industries in Dearborn; Continental Cablevision in Southfield, Dearborn Heights, Madison Heights and Hazel Park; Harron Cable in Port Huron; Omnicom in far western Wayne County (including Canton Charter Township) and Hamtramck; Maclean Hunter in many Downriver communities; and TCI in several Oakland County suburbs and the Downriver communities of Lincoln Park, Riverview, Woodhaven, Trenton and Gibraltar), and when Univision was known as the Spanish International Network (SIN). However, it was never available on WOW! Detroit, Bright House Livonia, Wyandotte Municipal Services or Cogeco Windsor; WOW continued to carry the national feed instead, while Bright House does not have the station or the network on any of its lineups in Livonia, Farmington, Novi or Redford, and Wyandotte Municipal Services also does not carry the station or the network on its lineup in the city of Wyandotte. Cogeco Windsor does not carry Univision in any form due to restrictions set by the CRTC. Comcast later moved the station to channel 18 in Detroit to make room for the Michigan feed of the Big Ten Network, which now occupies channel 65.

Due to the 2008 bankruptcy of Equity Broadcasting, WUDT was sold at auction to the Daystar Television Network on April 16, 2009; the sale closed in July 2009. In August 2009, the station began to show only a slide with the Univision logo and station identification. Comcast immediately removed WUDT from its lineup and reverted to carrying the national Univision feed. On August 26, at about 5 p.m., WUDT switched to Daystar. This left Detroit without a full-time Spanish-language outlet.

On April 6, 2010, WUDT switched off its analog signal and broadcast on digital channel 8. At some point in mid-June 2010, WUDT-LD went silent, returning to the air as of July 27, 2010.

Daystar reached a deal to sell WUDT-CD, along with WSVT-CD in Tampa, Florida, to LocusPoint Networks in December 2012. The deal will make it a sister station to two other Detroit stations, WDWO-CD (which LocusPoint acquired in March 2013) and W33BY (which LocusPoint acquired in April 2014). In the meantime, in May 2013, Daystar surrendered the class A status for WUDT and three other stations.

On December 15, 2014, Ion Media Networks, the owners of WPXD-TV, reached a deal to donate its translator station W48AV (channel 48) in St. Clair Shores to Daystar. As part of the transaction, Daystar requested a special temporary authority for it to relocate to UHF 23, the same channel as WUDT-LD; this was granted.

=== News ===
From 2005 until June 2008, the station presented a nightly newscast, produced and anchored in Denver, Colorado, with stories produced in the Detroit area originating from the station's offices in Troy. On June 6, 2008, Equity discontinued local newscasts at its six Univision affiliates, including WUDT.

== Trivia ==
- WUDT was the largest of Equity's three television stations in Michigan. Equity also owned and operated Retro Jams affiliate WUHQ-LP in Grand Rapids and dual-Fox/MyNetworkTV affiliate WMQF in Marquette (now WZMQ). WUHQ would also be sold to Daystar, with WMQF being sold to a Wisconsin company, MMMRC, LLC.
- Equity would also acquire another former MTV2 station, WBWX-CA, now WUMN-LP channel 13 in Minneapolis, also a Univision affiliate. WUMN, along with its sister station, Telefutura affiliate WTMS-CA, channel 7, would be sold to Silver Point Capital. WUMN is owned today by the Media Vista Group, while WTMS had ceased operations.
- Equity's presence was felt elsewhere in Detroit as ABC affiliate WXYZ-TV began its service of the Retro Television Network, which began broadcasting starting in the spring of 2008 as RTN7. Equity (which once owned RTN) and the E. W. Scripps Company made the deal official on September 21, 2007. Shortly after WXYZ launched RTN7, the network was sold to Luken Communications, LLC (now Get After It Media). RTN, later reacronymed "RTV", was seen on WXYZ-TV until 2011, when it was replaced with the Live Well Network.

== Technical information ==
The station operates with an effective radiated power of 15 kilowatts with a directional antenna, covering the immediate Detroit and Windsor areas, plus large parts of southern Oakland and Macomb counties and small portions of Wayne and Essex counties.

=== Subchannels ===
The station's digital signal is multiplexed:

Subchannels of WUDT-LD
Subchannel	Res.	Short name	Programming
23.1	1080i	WUDT	Daystar
23.2	720p	WUDT-ES	Daystar Español
23.3	480i	WUDT	Daystar Reflections

The station applied for a license to operate digitally on VHF channel 8. The application was filed and a construction permit was granted on October 10, 2007, and it expires on October 11, 2010. The station went on air shortly after. WUDT's digital signal was between the digital signals of WJBK-TV on channel 7 and CBET-DT on channel 9, which may cause some interference. This may also cause interference with Cleveland's WJW in the southeastern areas of Essex County, which has its digital signal on channel 8 as well.

=== Analog-to-digital conversion ===
Because of reception challenges, Daystar subsequently filed an application to permit WUDT to broadcast its digital signal on channel 23, its old analog frequency, at 15 kW, directional. The application was granted by the FCC on January 17, 2012, with the construction permit expiring September 1, 2015. As a low-power station, WUDT was not required to transition to digital television when full service stations were required to do so in 2009; however, all low-powered stations, including WUDT, must make the transition by September 1, 2015. On May 3, 2012, the station moved back to UHF 23, increasing power substantially from 300 to 15,000 watts. On May 10, 2012, the station upgraded to class A digital status, becoming WUDT-CD; a year later, Daystar elected to revert the station to a traditional low-power license.

At some point in May 2015, WUDT-LD went silent, having been merged into its now-sister station, W48AV-D, which has since switched to digital operations as a Daystar station. While WUDT-LD's license remains active (and both remain owned by Daystar via its Word of God Fellowship subsidiary), though W48AV-D's license would be cancelled in 2016, with the station re-assuming the identity of WUDT-LD.

== See also ==
- Media in Detroit
