= List of Daystar Television Network stations =

The following is a list of affiliates for the Daystar Television Network, a religious television network in the United States.

== Affiliates ==
List of Daystar Television Network affiliates
| Media market | State/Dist./Terr. | Station | Channel |
|---|---|---|---|
| Berry | Alabama | WSFG-LD | 31.1 |
| Birmingham | Alabama | WBUN-LD | 28.1 |
| Fayette | Alabama | WSSF-LD | 51.1 |
| Mobile | Alabama | WDPM-DT | 18.1 |
| Montgomery | Alabama | WETU-LD | 39.1 |
| Holbrook | Arizona | KDTP | 11.1 |
| Phoenix | Arizona | KDPH-LD | 48.1 |
| Tucson | Arizona | KPCE-LD | 29.1 |
| Jonesboro | Arkansas | KJBW-LD | 35.8 |
| Little Rock | Arkansas | KKAP | 36.1 |
| Springdale | Arkansas | KWOG | 57.1 |
| Bakersfield | California | KJOI-LD | 32.2 |
| Fresno | California | KGMC | 43.3 |
| Fort Bragg | California | KQSL | 8.2 |
| Huntington Beach | California | KOCE-TV | 50.3 |
| Los Angeles | California | KNET-CD | 25.1 |
| Modesto | California | KACA-LD | 34.1 |
| Sacramento | California | KRJR-LD | 44.1 |
| San Diego | California | KVSD-LD | 26.1 |
| San Francisco | California | KDTS-LD | 52.1 |
| Santa Rosa | California | KDAS-LD | 52.1 |
| Denver | Colorado | KRMT | 41.1 |
| Fort Collins | Colorado | KPXH-LD | 53.1 |
| Grand Junction | Colorado | KLML | 20.10 |
| Washington | District of Columbia | WDDN-LD | 23.1 |
| Daytona Beach | Florida | WPXB-LD | 50.1 |
| Fort Myers | Florida | WXDT-LD | 23.1 |
| Jacksonville | Florida | WUJF-LD | 33.1 |
| Miami | Florida | WBEH-CD | 38.1 |
| Panama City | Florida | WBIF | 51.1 |
| Port St. Lucie | Florida | WSLF-LD | 35.1 |
| Tallahassee | Florida | WXTL-LD | 36.4 |
| Tampa | Florida | WSVT-LD | 18.1 |
| Tampa | Florida | WGCT-LD | 19.2 |
| West Palm Beach | Florida | WBWP-LD | 19.5 |
| Atlanta | Georgia | WDTA-LD | 35.1 |
| Gainesville | Georgia | WGGD-LD | 23.1 |
| Macon | Georgia | WDMA-CD | 31.1 |
| Honolulu | Hawaii | KWBN | 41.6 |
| Pocatello | Idaho | KPIF | 15.10 |
| Chicago | Illinois | WDCI-LD | 57.1 |
| Sugar Grove | Illinois | WILC-CD | 8.1 |
| Indianapolis | Indiana | WDTI | 69.1 |
| South Bend | Indiana | WEID-LD | 18.1 |
| Wichita | Kansas | KWKD-LD | 28.1 |
| Louisville | Kentucky | WDYL-LD | 28.1 |
| Baton Rouge | Louisiana | W31EL-D | 48.1 |
| New Orleans | Louisiana | KNLD-LD | 28.1 |
| Shreveport | Louisiana | KADO-CD | 40.1 |
| Albuquerque | New Mexico | K34PZ-D | 38.1 |
| Baltimore | Maryland | WWDD-LD | 49.1 |
| Boston | Massachusetts | WYDN | 48.1 |
| Detroit | Michigan | WUDT-LD | 23.1 |
| Grand Rapids | Michigan | WUHQ-LD | 29.1 |
| Duluth | Minnesota | KMYN-LD | 32.2 |
| Minneapolis–St. Paul | Minnesota | WDMI-LD | 62.1 |
| Rochester | Minnesota | KXSH-LD | 35.2 |
| Jefferson City | Missouri | KRMS-LD | 32.8 |
| Kansas City | Missouri | KCDN-LD | 43.1 |
| Springfield | Missouri | KWBM | 31.1 |
| St. Louis | Missouri | KUMO-LD | 51.1 |
| St. Louis | Missouri | WPXS | 13.1 |
| Billings | Montana | KINV-LD | 14.2 |
| Kalispell | Montana | K26DD-D | 26.8 |
| Omaha | Nebraska | KOHA-LD | 27.3 |
| Las Vegas | Nevada | KLVD-LD | 23.1 |
| Atlantic City | New Jersey | W29FF-D | 45.1 |
| Amityville | New York | WPXU-LD | 38.1 |
| New York City | New York | WXNY-LD | 32.1 |
| Springville | New York | WBBZ-TV | 67.4 |
| Syracuse | New York | WNYI | 52.1 |
| Bismarck | North Dakota | KXBK-LD | 15.6 |
| Charlotte | North Carolina | WDMC-LD | 25.1 |
| Raleigh | North Carolina | WACN-LD | 27.1 |
| Raleigh | North Carolina | WDRN-LD | 45.1 |
| Raleigh | North Carolina | WWIW-LD | 66.1 |
| Winston-Salem | North Carolina | WHWD-LD | 21.1 |
| Cincinnati | Ohio | WDYC-LD | 36.1 |
| Cleveland | Ohio | WCDN-LD | 53.1 |
| Columbus | Ohio | WGCT-CD | 39.3 |
| Dayton | Ohio | WLWD-LD | 20.1 |
| Toledo | Ohio | WDTJ-LD | 68.1 |
| Oklahoma City | Oklahoma | KOCM | 46.1 |
| Tulsa | Oklahoma | KTZT-CD | 29.1 |
| Portland | Oregon | KPXG-LD | 42.1 |
| Kingston | Pennsylvania | WRLD-LD | 30.3 |
| Philadelphia | Pennsylvania | WELL-LD | 45.1 |
| Pittsburgh | Pennsylvania | WPDN-LD | 65.1 |
| San Juan | Puerto Rico | WTCV | 18.1 |
| Ponce | Puerto Rico | WVOZ-TV | 18.1 |
| Aguadilla | Puerto Rico | WVEO | 18.1 |
| Providence | Rhode Island | WMPX-LD | 33.1 |
| Columbia | South Carolina | WKDC-LD | 50.1 |
| Spartanburg–Greenville | South Carolina | WSQY-LD | 51.1 |
| Alexandria | Tennessee | WRTN-LD | 6.1 |
| Knoxville | Tennessee | WDTT-LD | 24.1 |
| Memphis | Tennessee | WDNM-LD | 59.1 |
| Nashville | Tennessee | WNPX-LD | 24.1 |
| Nashville | Tennessee | WNTU-LD | 26.1 |
| Austin | Texas | KADT-LD | 16.1 |
| Beaumont | Texas | KJYK-LD | 19.5 |
| Corpus Christi | Texas | KCCX-LD | 24.3 |
| Dallas–Fort Worth | Texas | KDTN | 2.1 |
| Houston | Texas | KLTJ | 22.1 |
| Houston | Texas | KDHU-LD | 50.1 |
| McAllen | Texas | KRZG-CD | 35.8 |
| San Antonio | Texas | KQVE-LD | 46.1 |
| Tyler | Texas | KXXW-LD | 13.2 |
| Waco | Texas | KZCZ-LD | 34.1 |
| Logan | Utah | KUTF | 12.1 |
| Salt Lake City | Utah | KSUD-LD | 33.1 |
| Chesapeake | Virginia | WVAD-LD | 25.1 |
| Richmond | Virginia | WRID-LD | 48.1 |
| Pullman | Washington | KQUP | 24.1 |
| Spokane | Washington | KQUP-LD | 14.1 |
| Tacoma–Seattle | Washington | KWDK | 56.1 |
| Huntington–Charleston | West Virginia | WTSF | 61.1 |
| Green Bay | Wisconsin | WGBD-LD | 49.1 |
| Madison | Wisconsin | WMWD-LD | 38.1 |
| Milwaukee | Wisconsin | WDMW-LD | 65.1 |
