= KMMF =

Television station in Missoula, Montana (2002–2009)

- Missoula, Montana; United States
- City: Missoula, Montana
- Channels: Analog: 17 (UHF)

Programming
- Affiliations: Fox (2002–2009); MyNetworkTV (secondary, 2006–2009)

Ownership
- Owner: Equity Media Holdings Corporation; (Montana License Subsidiary, Inc.)

History
- Founded: April 25, 2000
- First air date: 2002
- Last air date: June 12, 2009
- Call sign meaning: Missoula, Montana, Fox

Technical information
- Facility ID: 81348
- ERP: 50 kW
- HAAT: 628 m (2,060 ft)
- Transmitter coordinates: 46°48′8″N 113°58′19″W
- Translator(s): KMMF-LP 34 Kalispell

KMMF (channel 17) was a television station in Missoula, Montana, United States, affiliated with the Fox network. Founded on April 25, 2000, the station was owned by Equity Broadcasting. Its signal was repeated in Kalispell on KMMF-LP (channel 34).

KMMF added MyNetworkTV as a secondary affiliation in September 2006.

KMMF was fed from Equity's hub in Little Rock, Arkansas, by March 2008. Technical issues dramatically increased in number after this was implemented.

At auction on April 16, 2009, Max Media bought the Fox affiliations and certain programming assets, but not the broadcasting facilities, of KMMF and the rest of Equity's Montana Fox station system.

== Demise ==
Because it was granted an original construction permit after the FCC finalized the DTV allotment plan on April 21, 1997, the station did not receive a companion channel for a digital television station. Instead, at the end of the digital TV conversion period for full-service stations, KMMF would have been required to turn off its analog signal and turn on its digital signal (called a "flash-cut").

As of December 2008, this station was scheduled to go dark in 2009. According to the station's DTV status report, "On December 8, 2008, the licensee's parent corporation filed a petition for bankruptcy relief under chapter 11 of the federal bankruptcy code... This station must obtain post-petition financing and court approval before digital facilities may be constructed. The station will cease analogue broadcasting on February 17, 2009, regardless of whether digital facilities are operational by that date. The station will file authority to remain silent if so required by the FCC."

While the DTV Delay Act extended this deadline to June 12, 2009, Equity had applied for an extension of the digital construction permit in order to retain the broadcast license after the station goes dark.

On July 1, 2009, Max Media established a new Fox affiliate on the digital subchannel of its ABC affiliates, KTMF (channel 23) in Missoula and KTMF-LD in Kalispell. KMMF was shut down on June 12, 2009, when analog broadcasting ended. On that date or shortly thereafter, Equity fully returned the KMMF and KMMF-LP licenses to the FCC, who then deleted both call signs.

Earlier, it had been reported that only cable subscribers could watch Fox programming in western Montana. It is unclear from the story what Fox affiliate they received. At the time, there was only one operating Fox station in the state, KHMT (channel 4) in the Billings area (licensed to Hardin). The network could have exported the signal from another city, possibly Denver (KDVR, channel 31) or Salt Lake City (KSTU, channel 13); additionally, at least in Great Falls, Equity arranged for KLMN (channel 26), which shut down for similar reasons to KMMF, to remain on cable as that market's Max Media station, KFBB-TV (channel 5), prepared to launch its Fox subchannel.
