= Equity Media Holdings =

American TV broadcasting company (1998–2009)

Equity Media Holdings Corporation
- Type: Public
- Traded as: Nasdaq: EMDAQ
- Industry: Broadcasting
- Founded: 1998; 28 years ago
- Founders: Gregory W. Fess; Larry E. Morton
- Defunct: 2009
- Fate: Chapter 11 bankruptcy
- Headquarters: Little Rock, Arkansas, U.S.
- Key people: John E. Oxendine (president, CEO); Gregory W. Fess (COO, SVP); Neal Ardman (VP TVOps)
- Services: TV Stations
- Subsidiaries: CASH; Equity Broadcasting
- Website: web.archive.org/web/20100330123237/http://www.emdaholdings.com (Defunct)

Equity Media Holdings Corporation was a broadcasting company based in Little Rock, Arkansas, that owned and operated television stations across the United States. Prior to March 30, 2007, the company was known as Equity Broadcasting, a name later used for its broadcast station subsidiary. The company had a focus on Hispanic and Asian American communities in large markets while owning a combination of English-language network affiliates in medium and small markets.

Equity was known for its use of broadcast automation to control dozens of small, local VHF and UHF television broadcasting stations from one central Little Rock location; the feeds were readily visible on free-to-air satellite television through much of North America, despite the very small terrestrial footprint of the individual stations over the air. Most commonly, Equity stations were low-power television affiliates of Univision, Fox, The WB/UPN or carried music videos and classic television reruns.

In late 2005, Equity launched the Retro Television Network (RTN for short), a programming service with a lineup of "classic" shows from the 1950s through the 1980s which currently airs in part or full in numerous markets (controversially replacing UPN in one). Equity sold RTN to Luken Communications in June 2008.

Equity filed for Chapter 11 bankruptcy on December 8, 2008 and auctioned the individual stations on April 16, 2009. Many stations were sold to broadcast companies such as Daystar Television Network.

== Financial troubles ==
In the company's annual report for 2007, released on April 2, 2008, Equity said that the company was in default on its credit lines, and that if it could not find additional financing it "will need to cease all or a portion of its operations, seek protection under U.S. bankruptcy laws and regulations, engage in a restructuring or undertake a combination of these and other actions." An earlier indication of Equity's troubles came one month previously when its board of directors appointed its chairman, Henry Luken, to replace Equity founder Larry Morton as president and CEO. Morton remained the chair, president and CEO of Retro Television Network.

Retro Television Network was sold to Luken's company, Luken Communications, on June 25, 2008. Luken Communications continued to operate RTN out of Little Rock, Arkansas, as a client of Equity's C.A.S.H. system.

In June 2008, Equity instituted a companywide suspension of news programs.

In November 2008, Equity began attempts to sell all of its TV stations and cut most of the company's top management in a move which Chief Restructuring Officer Paul Brissette believed could allow the company a chance to avoid bankruptcy.

Equity filed for Chapter 11 bankruptcy on December 8, 2008, after the company defaulted on a loan worth $41.5 million. One of its creditors, Silver Point Finance, soon filed to change the bankruptcy from a voluntary Chapter 11 to an involuntary Chapter 7 in an attempt to foreclose on Equity assets, as they felt that there was no way Equity could reorganize under Chapter 11, nor did they have enough funds to cover payroll.

Silver Point ended its attempts to push the company directly into liquidation on December 23, in return for the appointment of Kim D. Kelly, a new Chief Restructuring Officer (CRO) who exerted near-total control to run the company and handle decisions on the sale of the individual stations.

Trading in Equity Media Holdings Corporation (EMDA.Q) common stock, units, and warrants were suspended on December 18, 2008; NASDAQ announced on January 15, 2009, that the Equity-related securities were de-listed permanently.

The sale of Equity's flagship Little Rock TV station KWBF (now Nexstar Broadcasting Group's KARZ-TV) closed at the end of January 2009; similarly named RTN radio station KWBF-FM had also been sold (to Flinn Broadcasting Corporation) and went silent in November 2008, later returning as KZTS under its new owner. Equity had also unexpectedly terminated a deal with the Southland Conference to carry University of Central Arkansas basketball games on KKYK-DT, effective January 14, 2009.

Silver Point extended a $58 million "debtor in possession" loan on February 2, 2009, to keep Equity on-air under chief restructuring officer Kim D. Kelly, but at a hefty interest rate premium: 8% above the current London Interbank Offered Rate. The chief restructuring officer was not answerable in any way to Equity's board.

On April 10, 2009, Equity announced an auction of all its stations, held on April 16 in Dallas. About 60 stations (counting repeater transmitters) were sold (subject to FCC approval) at a total of $21.3 million.

=== Retro Television Network ===
Equity Media had been paid to provide centralcasting services for RTN after that network was sold to Luken Communications for $25 million in June 2008. Equity had held an option to re-purchase RTN from Luken; that option expired unexercised on December 24, 2008.

On January 4, 2009, a contract conflict between Equity and Luken Communications, the owners of RTN, interrupted the programming on many RTN affiliates with Luken alleging that Equity had left many obligations to RTN's creditors, including programming suppliers, unpaid. As a result, Luken restored a national RTN feed from its headquarters in Chattanooga, Tennessee, via SES Americom-owned satellite AMC 9 (83.0°W), with individual feeds to non-Equity-owned affiliates following on a piecemeal basis. Equity owned or operated stations lost RTN affiliation immediately, though Luken vowed to find new affiliates for RTN in those areas. A message displayed on-screen by Equity's stations in place of RTN gave Henry Luken's cell number as a contact number for viewers. As a result of this dispute, Luken pulled out of a deal to buy Equity's southwest Florida stations.

By January 7, 2009, various Equity-owned or operated stations were broadcasting classic movies (or in some cases, Retro Jams) in place of RTN's content;. Around January 21, some of these stations began to carry This TV, a new subchannel network owned by MGM and Weigel Broadcasting.

=== Digital transition issues ===
In mid-December 2008, Equity filed notice with the Federal Communications Commission that more than a dozen of its individual analog-only full service stations would not be able to acquire equipment for digital TV transition without court approval, and these recently constructed full-power stations would therefore go dark at the end of digital transition (originally scheduled for February 17, 2009; since extended to June 12, 2009). Stations with existing digital broadcasts or low-power broadcasting stations on channels 2 - 51 would not be affected.

Equity had requested that the FCC extend the expiry dates of digital construction permits for these stations, a possible means of retaining the affected licenses until a buyer can be found.

Full-service stations taken dark at the end of digital transition include:

- KEGS (Goldfield, Nevada)

Affected stations sold to Daystar:

- KUTF (TeleFutura, Logan, Utah)
- KQUP (ex-RTN, Pullman, Washington)
- KWBM (MyTV, Harrison, Arkansas)
- WBIF (This TV, Marianna, Florida)
- WNGS (This TV, Springville, New York)
- WNYI (Univisión, Ithaca, New York)

Affected stations sold to Max Media, then closed down:

- KBTZ (Fox, Butte, Montana)
- KLMN^{*} (Fox, Great Falls, Montana)
- KMMF (Fox, Missoula, Montana)

Affected station sold to Pinnacle Media:

- KPBI (MyTV, Eureka Springs, Arkansas)

Affected station sold to Tyler Media:

- KUOK (Univisión, Woodward/Oklahoma City)

Affected station sold to Valley Bank, and then Fusion Communications:

- KWWF (ex-RTN, Waterloo, Iowa)

- While KLMN had already applied to reduce its analog signal power to 50 kW, the license remained that of a full-service station. Its new owners therefore would've had to convert it to digital to continue broadcasting after December 6, 2009.

Often, the stations went dark on the June 12, 2009, analog shutdown date only to return to the air digitally under their new owners just before the June 2010 FCC expiry date of their digital TV construction permits. WNGS and WNYI are among this group.

Equity's situation was unique due to its rapid and recent expansion. Many of its full-service stations were built during the last few years of digital transition and therefore were in the position of needing to flash-cut to digital in 2009 or cease operation. Established full-service broadcasters (who signed on before the start of transition) had (with rare exception) been required to operate existing digital simulcasts on another channel for several years, so their digital equipment was therefore already in place long before the 2008 recession and the 2009 analog TV shutdown. Several Ion Television stations which signed on when digital licenses began to be issued in the early 2000s did the reverse of Equity, declining to build out redundant and costly analog facilities which would only be used for a few years, and signing them on exclusively as digital-only stations which were located within the core of their market area, despite losing out on analog viewership in their early histories.

The former Equity full-service stations therefore represented the single largest block of stations to go dark on the June 12, 2009, digital transition date.

== C.A.S.H. system ==
A trait unique to Equity Media Holdings Corporation was their usage of a centralized group-wide hub (called by Equity the Central Automated Satellite Hub, or C.A.S.H, system) where all production, programming, and master control is handled from a facility adjacent to the company's headquarters. Though such hubbing is done on regional scales for many groups, no other company had done it to the scale and magnitude of Equity and C.A.S.H.

Various C.A.S.H. stations were available free-to-air throughout North America on Ku band via Galaxy 18 (123°W) or on C band via Galaxy 3C (95°W). The feeds were in a format intended to be fed directly to a terrestrial television transmitter with no further studio processing.

Former logo as Equity Broadcasting

Satellite transponder space was rented from Intelsat, which claimed as of December 2008 to be owed over $580,000.

As much of the free-to air satellite programming in North America consists of ethnic-language or specialised content, Equity's demise represented a significant loss in available English/Spanish-language Ku-band free television in the US.

== Stations ==
Under the protection of Chapter 11 bankruptcy, Equity Media Holdings Corporation sold most of these TV stations at an auction in Dallas on April 16, 2009, for a total of $21.3 million. Other stations were sold at later dates or ultimately went dark.

City of license / market	Call sign	Channel	Network affiliation	Current status
Eureka Springs, AR	KPBI	34	MyNetworkTV	KXNW, owned by Nexstar Media Group
Fayetteville, AR	KXUN-LP	36	Univision	KFFS-CD translator KQRY-LD, owned by Pinnacle Media
Fort Smith, AR	KFDF-CA	44	This TV (Note: Affiliated with RTN until the dispute between Equity and Luken in January 2009.)	Estrella TV affiliate owned by Pinnacle Media
Fort Smith, AR	KPBI-CA	46	MyNetworkTV	Defunct, ceased operations in 2008
Harrison, AR–Springfield, MO	KWBM	31	MyNetworkTV	Daystar owned-and-operated (O&O)
Little Rock, AR	KLRA-LP	30	Univision	Telemundo affiliate KKYK-CD, owned by KTV Media
Little Rock, AR	KWBF	42	MyNetworkTV	KARZ-TV, owned by Nexstar Media Group
Little Rock, AR	KKYK-DT	49	Independent	MeTV affiliate KKYK-DT, owned by LR Telecasting
Denver, CO	KQDK-CA	33	Independent	CTN owned-and-operated (O&O)
Fort Myers, FL	WTLE-LP	18	TeleFutura	Defunct, ceased operations in 2009
Fort Myers, FL	WUVF-LD	2	Univision	Sun Broadcasting (Note: Operated by Fort Myers Broadcasting Company.)
Fort Myers, FL	WEVU-CA	4	Univision (WUVF-LP)	Defunct, ceased operations in 2009
Naples, FL	WBSP-CA	7	Univision (WUVF-LP)	Defunct, ceased operations in 2009
Naples, FL	WLZE-LD	51	Univision	Sun Broadcasting
Marianna, FL	WBIF	51	This TV	Daystar owned-and-operated (O&O)
Williston, FL	W56EJ	56	LAT TV	Defunct, license cancelled in 2010
Williston, FL	W63DB	63	—N/a	Defunct, license cancelled in 2012
Waterloo, IA	KWWF	22	Independent	Defunct, license cancelled in 2013
Mount Vernon, IL–St. Louis, MO	WPXS	13	Independent	Daystar owned-and-operated (O&O)
Lexington, KY	WBLU-LP	62	Independent	Defunct, ceased operations in 2009
Detroit, MI	WUDT-CA	23	Univision	Daystar owned-and-operated (O&O)
Marquette, MI	WMQF	19	Fox/MyNetworkTV	MeTV/CBS affiliate WZMQ, owned by Lilly Broadcasting
Minneapolis, MN	WTMS-CA	7	TeleFutura	Defunct, ceased operations in 2009
Minneapolis, MN	WUMN-CA	21	Univision	Owned by Media Vista Group
Kansas City, MO	KUKC-LP	20	Univision	Owned by Media Vista Group
Jackson, MS	WJMF-LP	6	Univision (KUOK)	Independent owned by Rainey Radio
Butte, MT	KBTZ	24	Fox/MyNetworkTV	Defunct, ceased operations in 2009
Great Falls, MT	KLMN	26	Fox	Defunct, ceased operations in 2009
Missoula, MT	KMMF	17	Fox/MyNetworkTV	Defunct, ceased operations in 2009
Scottsbluff, NE	KTUW	16	Independent	Defunct, ceased operations in 2009
Goldfield, NV	KEGS	7	Independent	Defunct, ceased operations in 2009
Las Vegas, NV	KEGS-LP	30	Independent	All-infomercial independent owned by Innovate Corp.
Las Vegas, NV	KNBX-CA	31	TeleFórmula	EEE Network affiliate owned by Innovate Corp.
Laughlin, NV	KMCC (Note: Owned by Cranston II and managed by Equity Media Holdings.)	34	Multimedios Televisión	Independent owned by the E. W. Scripps Company
Reno, NV	KRRI-LP	25	Independent	Silent station owned by Adaptive Broadcasting Group
Reno, NV	KELM-LP	43	—N/a	Defunct, ceased operations in 2014
Ithaca, NY	WNYI	52	Univision	Daystar owned-and-operated (O&O)
Springville–Buffalo, NY	WNGS (Note: Operated by Granite Broadcasting.)	67	This TV	MeTV affiliate WBBZ-TV, owned by Philip A. Arno
Norman, OK	KUOK-CA	11	Univision (KUOK)	Defunct, ceased operations in 2009
Tulsa, OK	KUTU-CA	25	Univision	Owned by Tyler Media Group
Woodward–Oklahoma City, OK	KUOK	36	Univision	Owned by Tyler Media Group
Roseburg–Eugene, OR	KTVC	36	Independent	3ABN owned-and-operated (O&O)
Nashville, TN	WNTU-LP	26	Univision	Daystar owned-and-operated (O&O)
Amarillo, TX	KAMT-LP	50	TeleFutura	Defunct, ceased operations in 2010
Borger–Amarillo, TX	KEYU	31	Univision	Telemundo affiliate owned by Gray Media
Waco, TX	KWKO-LP	38	Univision	Defunct, license cancelled in 2010
Wichita Falls, TX	KUWF-LP	36	Univision	Defunct, ceased operations in 2010
Price, UT	KCBU	3	Independent	Defunct, ceased operations in 2009
Salt Lake City, UT	KUTF	12	TeleFutura	Daystar owned-and-operated (O&O)
Salt Lake City, UT	KUTH (Note: Owned by Univision and operated by Equity Media Holdings.)	32	Univision	Univision owned-and-operated (O&O)
Burlington, VT	WGMU-CA	39	MyNetworkTV	Defunct, ceased operations in 2013
Pullman–Spokane, WA	KQUP	24	Independent	Daystar owned-and-operated (O&O)
Seattle, WA	KUSE-LP	46	Daystar (KWDK)	Vision Latina affiliate owned by Innovate Corp.
Cheyenne, WY	KQCK	33	AMGTV	CTN owned-and-operated (O&O)
Cheyenne, WY	KDEV-LP	40	ABC (KTWO-TV)	Defunct, ceased operations in 2012

The following stations were pending purchases by Equity Media in 2008 but never completed:

- WBQM-LP- Brooklyn, New York - A Cornerstone Television station
- WMBQ-CA- Cranford, New Jersey - An MTV2 station; since changed to Cornerstone Television

The following construction permits had been issued to Equity before its 2008 bankruptcy filing; the company was unable to build the stations.

- Reno, Nevada (another station)
- West Palm Beach, Florida

== Other properties ==
- Arkansas RiverBlades (a defunct ECHL ice hockey franchise in Little Rock, Arkansas; Equity owned 51% interest in team; folded in 2003)
- Arkansas Twisters (an af2 arena football franchise in Little Rock; since moved to Allen, Texas and renamed the Allen Wranglers, as part of the Indoor Football League)

== Liabilities ==
In December 2008, Equity's key liabilities included:

- $41.5 million to private equity firm Silver Point Finance LLC of Greenwich, Connecticut.
- $1.3 million to CBS Corporation for RTN programming run during the time Equity owned Retro Television Network.
- $583,931.25 to Intelsat.
- Undetermined additional liabilities to NBC (as a programming supplier) and Univision.

== See also ==
- Retro Jams
- Retro Television Network
- FTA receiver
