= KWWF =

Television station in Waterloo, Iowa (2002–2013)

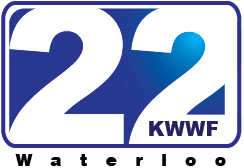

Waterloo–Cedar Rapids–; Iowa City–Dubuque, Iowa; United States
- City: Waterloo, Iowa
- Channels: Digital: 22 (UHF); Virtual: 22
- Branding: KWWF

Programming
- Affiliations: LeSEA (2002–2004); UPN (2004–2006); RTN (2006–2008); Independent (2008–2009); Untamed Sports TV (2009–2013)

Ownership
- Owner: Stratus Media Holdings, LLC; (Waterloo Television Group, LLC)

History
- First air date: December 1, 2002
- Last air date: August 2, 2013; (10 years, 244 days)
- Former channel number(s): Analog: 22 (UHF, 2002–2009)

Technical information
- Licensing authority: FCC
- Facility ID: 81595
- ERP: 70 kW
- HAAT: 197.3 m (647 ft)
- Transmitter coordinates: 42°24′35″N 92°5′10″W

Links
- Public license information: Public file; LMS

KWWF (channel 22) was an independent television station licensed to Waterloo, Iowa, United States, which served the Eastern Iowa television market. The station was owned by Stratus Media Holdings. KWWF's transmitter was located near Walker, Iowa.

== History ==
KWWF opened on December 1, 2002, with a format of infomercials, home shopping and public domain reruns. Later, the station began airing religious programs from LeSEA Broadcasting.

Equity Broadcasting bought the station in 2004, and quickly made it a general entertainment station. KWWF affiliated with UPN on September 13, 2004, and the station soon gained carriage on cable systems throughout the market. Under Equity ownership, the station's master control, located in Little Rock, Arkansas, relayed its signal via the Galaxy 18 satellite to the transmitter and area cable systems.

In 2006, Equity outright refused to affiliate their stations with The CW, the merger of UPN and The WB, with KWKB taking both that affiliation and second replacement network MyNetworkTV. This left Equity to have KWWF become an affiliate of Equity Broadcasting's own Retro Television Network to fill the gaps left by the end of UPN programming. In 2008, most RTN programming was removed from KWWF and moved to a digital subchannel of KWWL. KWWF then became an independent station, carrying various syndicated programs, as well as a handful of Equity-produced live shows, which were also aired on many RTN stations.

KWWF was sold to Valley Bank at auction on April 16, 2009, as a part of Equity's bankruptcy. Valley Bank, in turn, filed to sell KWWF to an ownership group connected to Fusion Communications in August.

Because it was granted an original construction permit after the Federal Communications Commission (FCC) finalized the digital television allotment plan on April 21, 1997, the station did not receive a companion channel for a digital television station. Instead, at the end of the digital TV conversion period for full-service stations, KWWF was required to turn off its analog signal and turn on its digital signal (called a "flash-cut").

As of December 2008, this station was scheduled to go dark in 2009. According to the station's DTV status report, "On December 8, 2008, the licensee's parent corporation filed a petition for bankruptcy relief under Chapter 11 of the federal bankruptcy code... This station must obtain post-petition financing and court approval before digital facilities may be constructed. The station will cease analog broadcasting on February 17, 2009, regardless of whether digital facilities are operational by that date. The station will file authority to remain silent if so required by the FCC."

While the DTV Delay Act extended this deadline to June 12, 2009, Equity applied for an extension of the digital construction permit, in order to retain the broadcast license in case the station went dark. Fusion Communications was able to build a temporary digital site near Walker to meet the deadline. At the end of analog broadcasting on June 12, 2009, KWWF transitioned from the old Equity facility to Fusion's Iowa master control facility and continued to provide a signal to cable systems. Thereafter, KWWF was affiliated with Untamed Sports TV. KWWF's satellite feed was still available on Anik F3 C-Band as of November 2010. Although the station transmitted in 720p, Untamed Sports never maintained a high definition programming feed and all programming on the station was carried in standard definition.

In 2012, Fusion Communications was acquired by Stratus Media Holdings. KWWF ceased broadcasting on August 2, 2013, due to financial difficulties. On August 8, 2013, the station's owners filed a Notification of Suspension of Operations / Request for Silent STA with the FCC. On March 14, 2014, Stratus surrendered KWWF's license to the Federal Communications Commission, which canceled the license a week later.
