= KBTZ =

- Butte, Montana; United States
- Channels: Analog: 24 (UHF)
- Branding: Fox Montana

Programming
- Affiliations: Fox (2003-2009); MyNetworkTV (secondary, 2006-2009)

Ownership
- Owner: Equity Media Holdings Corporation; (Montana License Subsidiary, Inc.)

History
- First air date: May 2, 2003
- Last air date: June 12, 2009

Technical information
- Facility ID: 81438
- ERP: 330 kW
- HAAT: 570 m (1,870 ft)
- Transmitter coordinates: 46°0′24″N 112°26′33″W
- Translator(s): KBTZ-LP 32 Bozeman

KBTZ (channel 24) was a television station in Butte, Montana, United States, affiliated with the Fox network. The station was owned by Equity Media Holdings, and was simulcast on translator station KBTZ-LP on UHF channel 32 in Bozeman.

According to Equity's website, KBTZ had a secondary affiliation with Fox's sister network, MyNetworkTV.

At auction on April 16, 2009, Max Media purchased the intellectual property and programming rights to KBTZ's programming, including its Fox and MyNetworkTV affiliations to launch digital subchannels on their existing stations; they did not buy the transmitter facilities for either station.

== Demise ==
Because it was granted an original construction permit after the FCC finalized the DTV allotment plan on April 21, 1997, the station did not receive a companion channel for a digital television station. Instead, at the end of the digital TV conversion period for full-service stations, KBTZ would be required to turn off its analog signal and turn on its digital signal (called a "flash-cut"). Equity Media refused to launch many of their station launched in the 2000s with either a digital companion channel or as digital-only operations, and as their financial state deteriorated during the Great Recession, it put their stations at risk of being forced to sign off at the time of the digital switchover. As with many Equity stations, all of its operations, outside of an engineer who repaired the tower and satellite link when requested, were run out of Equity's hub in Little Rock, Arkansas with no local presence of a staff; most cable providers thus took its signal directly from satellite to avoid the over-the-air reception issues embellic of Equity-operated stations.

On December 8, 2008, Equity filed for Chapter 11 bankruptcy under the Federal Rules of Bankruptcy Procedure, in its home state of Arkansas. Having not built out its facilities by June 12, 2009, the final date of full-power broadcasting under the DTV Delay Act, Equity applied for an extension of the digital construction permit for KBTZ in order to retain the broadcast license after the station would have to sign off.

This was made moot on July 1, 2009, as Fox disapproved of losing coverage in the state of Montana leading into the 2009 NFL season and contracted with Max Media to establish new Fox digital subchannels on its ABC affiliates, KWYB (channel 18) in Butte and KWYB-LD in Bozeman.

With no network to affiliate to, and the market at the time making acquiring another affiliation impossible, the debtors-in-possession of Equity decided not to offer the KBTZ stations for sale, and turned in the licenses to the FCC when requested. KBTZ was shut down on June 12, 2009, when analog broadcasting ended; both KBTZ and KBTZ-LP's callsigns have since been canceled by the FCC.
