= WBIF =

Television station in Marianna, Florida

- Marianna–Panama City, Florida; United States
- City: Marianna, Florida
- Channels: Digital: 26 (UHF); Virtual: 51

Programming
- Affiliations: 51.1: Daystar; 51.2: Daystar Español; 51.3: Daystar Reflections

Ownership
- Owner: Daystar Television Network; (Word of God Fellowship, Inc.)

History
- Founded: December 4, 1998
- First air date: September 10, 2001
- Former channel numbers: Analog: 51 (UHF, 2001–2009); Digital: 51 (UHF, 2009–2019)
- Former affiliations: Pax TV (2001–2004); UPN (2004–2006); RTN (2006–January 2009); This TV (January–April 2009); Dark (April−October 2009)

Technical information
- Licensing authority: FCC
- Facility ID: 81594
- ERP: 50 kW
- HAAT: 254 m (833 ft)
- Transmitter coordinates: 30°26′0″N 85°24′51″W

Links
- Public license information: Public file; LMS
- Website: daystar.com

WBIF (channel 51) is a religious television station licensed to Marianna, Florida, United States, serving the Panama City area. The station is owned by the Daystar Television Network. WBIF's transmitter is located on SR 20 in unincorporated Youngstown, Florida.

== History ==
Founded in December 1998 and began broadcasting in September 2001, the station was originally owned by Equity Media Holdings. It started as an affiliate of Pax TV until it joined UPN in 2004, before this, UPN programming was originally seen on WPCT from 1995 to 1998, and then UPN signed a deal with Gray Television, and as a result, between 1998 and 2006, WJHG-TV in the Panama City market aired UPN programming during the overnight hours. During this period, UPN programming was also seen on Panama City–area cable services via off-market stations, including WBFS-TV in Miami and WJTC in Mobile–Pensacola.

On January 24, 2006, Time Warner and CBS announced that The WB and UPN would merge to form a new network, The CW. As WJHG-TV took an affiliation with both The CW and MyNetworkTV, WBIF became an owned-and-operated station of the Retro Television Network. In addition to its main programming, WBIF also showed Tampa Bay Rays baseball from the Rays Television Network until the team became exclusive to Fox Sports Florida.

On January 4, 2009, a contract conflict between Equity and Luken Communications (who had acquired RTN in June 2008) interrupted the programming on many RTN affiliates. As a result, Luken moved RTN operations to its headquarters in Chattanooga, Tennessee, and dropped all Equity-owned affiliates, including WBIF, immediately, though Luken vowed to find a new affiliate for RTN in the area. On January 5, 2009, after a day of airing a red slide alerting viewers to the disruption of the RTN service, WBIF briefly signed off the air. Shortly thereafter, WBIF converted to a This TV affiliation that would turn out to be temporary.

On April 16, 2009, the station was auctioned and sold to Daystar and was taken dark upon Daystar's assumption of operations to build-out the digital facilities. It returned to the air on October 31.

== Technical information ==
=== Subchannels ===
The station's signal is multiplexed:

Subchannels of WBIF
Channel	Res.	Short name	Programming
51.1	1080i	WBIF-DT	Daystar
51.2	720p	WBIF-ES	Daystar Español
51.3	480i	WBIF-SD	Daystar Reflections

=== Analog-to-digital conversion ===
WBIF shut down its analog signal, over UHF channel 51, and "flash-cut" its digital signal into operation UHF channel 51. Because it was granted an original construction permit after the FCC finalized the DTV allotment plan on April 21, 1997, the station did not receive a companion channel for a digital television station.

According to the station's DTV status report, "On December 8, 2008, the licensee's parent corporation filed a petition for bankruptcy relief under chapter 11 of the federal bankruptcy code... This station must obtain post-petition financing and court approval before digital facilities may be constructed. The station [was originally going to] cease analogue broadcasting on February 17, 2009, regardless of whether digital facilities are operational by that date. The station will file authority to remain silent if so required by the FCC."

While the DTV Delay Act extended this deadline to June 12, 2009, Equity has applied for an extension of the digital construction permit in order to retain the broadcast license until the station can be sold and digital facilities constructed by a new owner.

After completing the station's digital facilities, Daystar signed WBIF back on October 30, 2009.
