= KEGS =

KEGS may refer to:

- King Edward's School (disambiguation), or King Edward's Grammar School
  - King Edward VI Aston, also known as KEGS Aston
  - King Edward VI Grammar School, Chelmsford, also known as KEGS Chelmsford
  - King Edward VI College, Nuneaton, Warwickshire, formerly King Edward VI Grammar School, also known as KEGS Nuneaton
  - King Edward VI Five Ways, also known as KEGS Five Ways
- KEGS (TV), a television station (channel 7) licensed to Goldfield, Nevada, United States
- KEGS-LP, a defunct television station (channel 30) formerly licensed to Las Vegas, Nevada, a repeater of KEGS

== See also ==
- Keg
