= KCBU =

Television station in Price, Utah

Price, Utah; United States
- Channels: Digital: 15 (UHF); Virtual: 15

Programming
- Affiliations: Unknown

Ownership
- Owner: Gray Media; (Gray Television Licensee, LLC)

History
- Founded: First incarnation: March 12, 2003
- First air date: First incarnation: October 24, 2003; Current incarnation: September 8, 2025
- Last air date: First incarnation: June 12, 2009
- Former call signs: KUTF (2003–March 2005, April–July 2005)
- Former channel numbers: Analog: 3 (VHF, 2003–2009)
- Former affiliations: TeleFutura (2003–2005); RTV (2005–January 2009); Independent (January–June 2009)
- Call sign meaning: Cocola Broadcasting Utah (former owner of KUTH-DT)

Technical information
- Licensing authority: FCC
- Facility ID: 776213
- ERP: 0.2 kW (license and DTS2 application); 300 kW (DTS1 application)
- HAAT: 622.2 m (2,041 ft) (license and DTS2 application); 1,209 m (3,967 ft) (DTS1 application)
- Transmitter coordinates: 39°45′25.2″N 110°59′22.9″W (license and DTS2 application); 40°39′36.3″N 112°12′8.4″W (DTS1 application)

Links
- Public license information: Public file; LMS

KCBU (channel 15) is a television station in Price, Utah, United States. The station is owned by Gray Media. KCBU's transmitter is located on Ford Ridge. Programming is currently unknown.

== History ==
The station had a construction permit to increase the power of the digital signal to 4 kilowatts and was to have moved its transmitter to a peak south of Springville, Utah. This would have effectively given the station signal reach into the Salt Lake City market it was a part of. When the construction permit was approved, KCBU was to broadcast on digital channel 11.

The station's license was applied for in 2003, and the station went on the air as KUTF on October 24 as a TeleFutura affiliate.

The station briefly changed its call sign to KCBU on March 31, 2005, but switched back to its original calls on April 29. On July 8, 2005, the station dropped TeleFutura for the English-language Retro Television Network, and the station's call sign was officially changed to KCBU that day.

On January 4, 2009, a contract conflict between Equity Media Holdings Corporation and RTV interrupted the programming on many RTV affiliates. As a result, Luken moved RTV operations to its headquarters in Chattanooga, Tennessee, and dropped all Equity-owned affiliates, including KCBU.

KCBU was sold at auction to Word of God Fellowship, the parent company of the Daystar network, on April 16, 2009, along with several other Equity properties. The station ceased analog operations on June 12, 2009, and never completed its digital facilities under Daystar, resulting in the cancellation of its license on July 6, 2010, as the network also purchased sister station KUTF (channel 12) in Logan, which would be converted to digital.

In 2024, Marquee Broadcasting agreed to swap the rights to the FCC construction permit for a new KCBU in Price to Gray Television in exchange for KGWN-TV in Cheyenne, Wyoming, and KCWY-DT in Casper, Wyoming. The station filed for a license to cover on September 8, 2025.
