= Channel 52 =

Channel 52 refers to several television stations:

== United States ==
The following low-power television stations, which are no longer licensed, formerly broadcast on analog channel 52:

- KCPL-LP in Rapid City, South Dakota

== See also ==
- Channel 52 virtual TV stations in the United States
