= FOX 32 =

Fox 32 may refer to one of the following television stations in the United States, affiliated with the Fox Broadcasting Company:

== Current ==
- WFLD in Chicago, Illinois (O&O)
- WFQX-TV in Cadillac, Michigan

== Former ==
- KBTZ-LP in Bozeman, Montana
  - Was translator for KBTZ in Butte, Montana (2003 to 2009)
- WXGZ (now WACY-TV) in Appleton/Green Bay, Wisconsin (1986 to 1992)
