= Fox 26 =

Fox 26 may refer to one of the following television stations in the United States affiliated with the Fox Broadcasting Company:

== Current ==
=== Owned-and-operated stations ===
- KFTC in Bemidji, Minnesota (satellite of KMSP-TV and WFTC in Minneapolis, Minnesota)
- KRIV in Houston, Texas (O&O)

=== Affiliated stations ===
- KMPH-TV in Visalia–Fresno, California
- KMVU-DT in Medford, Oregon
- KNPN-LD in St. Joseph, Missouri
- WSFX-TV in Wilmington, North Carolina
- WSJP-LD2 in Aguadilla, Puerto Rico
  - Semi-satellite of WVXF-DT2 in Charlotte Amalie, U.S. Virgin Islands

== Former ==
- K26ES (now KWYF-LD) in Casper, Wyoming (1999–2014)
- KLMN in Great Falls, Montana (2003–2009)
- KNDX in Bismarck, North Dakota (1999–2014)
- WGBA-TV in Green Bay, Wisconsin (1992–1995)
