= Channel 52 virtual TV stations in the United States =

The following television stations operate on virtual channel 52 in the United States:

- K15HQ-D in Sayre, Oklahoma
- K20NJ-D in Elk City, Oklahoma
- K27IG-D in Cortez, etc., Colorado
- K27JO-D in Strong City, Oklahoma
- K28OX-D in Weatherford, Oklahoma
- K31JW-D in Elk City, Oklahoma
- K35LF-D in Eureka, California
- KDAS-LD in Santa Rosa, California
- KDTS-LD in San Francisco, California
- KFWD in Fort Worth, Texas
- KPXH-LD in Fort Collins, Colorado
- KSBI in Oklahoma City, Oklahoma
- KVEA in Corona, California
- KZHD-LD in Rohnert Park, California
- W23DM-D in Falmouth, Kentucky
- WGGN-TV in Sandusky, Ohio
- WGVK in Kalamazoo, Michigan
- WHLV-TV in Cocoa, Florida
- WKON in Owenton, Kentucky
- WNJT in Trenton, New Jersey
- WNYI in Ithaca, New York
- WWRS-TV in Mayville, Wisconsin

The following stations, which are no longer licensed, formerly operated on virtual channel 52 in the U.S.:

- K30MI-D in Redding, California
- WBTD-LD in Suffolk, Virginia
- WMSY-TV in Marion, Virginia
