= WTLE-LP =

Television station in Fort Myers, Florida (1995–2009)

Fort Myers–Naples, Florida; United States
- City: Fort Myers, Florida
- Channels: Analog: 18 (UHF)

Programming
- Affiliations: Pax TV; Univision; Telefutura (until 2009)

Ownership
- Owner: Silver Point Capital; (SP Ft. Myers LLC)

History
- First air date: 1995
- Last air date: August 14, 2009
- Former call signs: W57CJ (1995–1999); WDPX-LP (1999–2005)
- Former channel numbers: Analog: 57 (UHF, 1995–2000)
- Call sign meaning: "Telefutura"

Technical information
- Licensing authority: FCC
- Facility ID: 36967
- Class: TX
- ERP: 50 kW
- HAAT: 119 m (390 ft)
- Transmitter coordinates: 26°44′32.24″N 81°48′51.33″W

Links
- Public license information: LMS

WTLE-LP (channel 18) was a low-power television station in Fort Myers, Florida, United States, which was last affiliated with the Spanish-language network Telefutura (now UniMás). Owned by Silver Point Capital, the station has, in the past, carried programming from Pax TV; it has also been a repeater for sister Univision affiliate WUVF-LP (channel 2).

== History ==
WTLE has previously been owned by Paxson Communications, Tiger Eye Broadcasting, and Equity Media Holdings.

On April 4, 2008, Equity announced the sale of all five of its Southwest Florida stations (including WTLE) to Luken Communications, LLC for $8 million. Equity has cited corporate financial losses as a reason for the sale.

Equity Media Holdings has been in Chapter 11 bankruptcy since December 2008 and offers by Luken Communications to acquire Equity-owned stations in six markets have since been withdrawn.

Silver Point Capital acquired WTLE at auction on April 16, 2009. The sale closed on August 17, 2009.

Three days before the completion of the sale to Silver Point, WTLE was taken silent. On March 10, 2011, its license was canceled by the Federal Communications Commission (FCC), and its call sign was deleted from the FCC's database.

After WTLE's sign-off, the Fort Myers market could only receive Telefutura/UniMás programming via the network's national feed on cable and satellite until 2014, when WUVF-LD signed on a second digital subchannel affiliated with the network.
