= WBBZ-TV =

Television station in Springville, New York

- Springville–Buffalo, New York; United States
- City: Springville, New York
- Channels: Digital: 7 (VHF); Virtual: 67
- Branding: WBBZ-TV 5

Programming
- Affiliations: 67.1: MeTV; for others, see § Subchannels

Ownership
- Owner: Code 3 Broadcasting; (ITV of Buffalo, LLC)

History
- First air date: January 2, 1997
- Former call signs: WJTQ (CP, 1993); WNGS (1993–2011)
- Former channel numbers: Analog: 67 (UHF, 1997–2009); Digital: 46 (UHF, until 2009)
- Former affiliations: Independent (1997–1998, 2003–2006, January 2009); UPN (1998–2002); Pax TV (secondary) (1998–1999); RTN (2006–January 2009); This TV (January−June 2009 and September 2010–2011); Dark (June 2009–May 2010); Daystar (May−September 2010)
- Call sign meaning: "Buffalo Buzz"

Technical information
- Licensing authority: FCC
- Facility ID: 9088
- ERP: 26.9 kW
- HAAT: 176 m (577 ft)
- Transmitter coordinates: 42°34′4.3″N 78°43′22.7″W

Links
- Public license information: Public file; LMS
- Website: wbbz.tv

WBBZ-TV (channel 67) is a television station licensed to Springville, New York, United States, serving the Buffalo area. It is affiliated with MeTV, with portions of the MeTV schedule replaced by original local programming. WBBZ-TV is owned by Code 3 Broadcasting, a locally-owned company controlled by Buffalo television veteran and former news photographer Philip A. Arno. The station's studios are located at the Eastern Hills Mall in Clarence, New York; its transmitter is located near Springville in the hills of southern Erie County.

The station signed on January 2, 1997, as WNGS, a low-powered, low-rated independent station owned by Caroline K. Powley and Bill Smith—operating together as B&C Communications—from studios and a transmitter in Ashford; the station affiliated with UPN the following year. The station was plagued with years of struggles in securing a favorable transmitter location and obtaining cable television coverage in the Buffalo area, compounded by a failed sale to the owners of WKBW-TV in 2000; those struggles led to WNGS losing the UPN affiliation to WNLO in 2003. Channel 67 was sold to Equity Broadcasting the following year, and WNGS became an affiliate of Equity's Retro Television Network (RTN) in 2006. In April of that year, WNGS entered into a joint sales agreement with WKBW-TV.

Equity filed for bankruptcy in December 2008, leading to a two-year period where channel 67's future was in limbo. WNGS lost RTN programming in favor of This TV after a dispute between Equity and RTN's new owners. When its digital facilities were not constructed before the analog television shut-off on June 12, 2009, the station went off the air despite its sale to the Daystar Television Network that April.

Channel 67 returned to the air in May 2010 after Arno announced its purchase of WNGS. Originally carrying Daystar programming, the station became a This TV affiliate once more until its re-launch in 2011 as WBBZ-TV, a MeTV affiliate; its owners gradually added local programming over the next few years.

== WNGS: The B&C Communications era ==
=== Construction and sign-on ===
In a revision of its television Table of Assignments, the Federal Communications Commission (FCC) allocated channel 67 to Springville, New York, 28 miles (45 km) south of Buffalo, on January 31, 1990, on a petition by Michael A. Williams; the channel was added on the condition that the transmitter be sited 5.5 miles (8.9 km) south of Springville to avoid potential interference with channel 60 at St. Catharines, Ontario, and a proposed channel 62 allotment at Arcade, New York.

Caroline K. Powley and Bill Smith of Altoona, Pennsylvania, doing business as Unicorn Springville, filed an application with the FCC for channel 67 on October 19, 1991. Powley was the daughter of John R. Powley, who had signed on FM radio station WHGM in Bellwood, Pennsylvania, in 1970 and television station WOPC in Altoona in 1974. Powley recalled hating television as a child because her father would constantly take her to look at transmission towers, but eventually expressed an interest in running a television station as she grew up, acting as her father's assistant when he got out of television ownership and into consultancy. Upon graduating from Penn State in 1991, Powley and Smith researched the television broadcast market and found Buffalo—then ranked 32nd among United States media markets—to be the highest-ranked market with an available station. The channel 67 application was unopposed, and Powley and Smith received a construction permit on February 1, 1993. Originally assigned the call sign WJTQ on March 12, Powley and Smith changed the call letters to WNGS on May 17, named for the Buffalo wings the two of them enjoyed eating while studying at Penn State.

Although their goal was to erect their transmitter tower in Colden, where WKBW-TV had its tower, the owners initially planned for WNGS to lease tower space from WNED-TV with 15,000 watts of effective radiated power; in September 1994, they decided on a location in the West Valley community of Ashford, not merely for their tower, but for their new home, as the two of them married that year. Construction of the building was completed in October 1995, although weather delays pushed back completion of the tower until July 27, 1996. Construction costs totaled $150,000, depleting their life savings and forcing Powley to borrow from her father; the couple, however, received $250,000 from station owner Bud Paxson in exchange for Powley and Smith dropping their application for a television station in Greenville, North Carolina.

Almost four years after the construction permit was issued, WNGS signed on the air on January 2, 1997, operating a 50,000-watt tower from West Valley. The station was initially carried on several Adelphia Cable systems in Western New York, replacing the superstation feed of WWOR-TV in Secaucus, New Jersey, that had ceased operations two days before, on its Lockport and International systems. Getting on TCI's cable systems was another matter entirely: FCC "must-carry" status applied if the station's signal reached the system's service area and certain other requirements were met. Smith alleged TCI required someone to scale the tower for "special TCI certification", and that further delays came as a result of repeated telephone calls and slight errors in paperwork.

WNGS secured an affiliation with the American Independent Network for certain programs, such as movies, children's programming, and classic sitcoms, and bolstered by barter syndicated programs; the station expressed a desire to affiliate with the United Paramount Network (UPN) in the future, and talks began with the network prior to sign-on. At the time, UPN was relegated to a secondary affiliation on primary Fox affiliate WUTV, and was displeased with the off-hours clearances for its programs, which aired weeknights starting at 1 a.m. Despite early talks between WNGS and UPN faltering when UPN originally proposed that they could pull their affiliation from WNGS at any time, it was reported in January 1998 that WNGS would become UPN's new affiliate in Buffalo on April 13 upon the expiration of the network's contract with WUTV. Two months after WNGS assumed the UPN affiliation, TCI finally agreed to carry channel 67 on its cable systems, dropping a pay-per-view preview channel in favor of WNGS. That year, WNGS picked up the rights to Buffalo Wings inline hockey matches, and on August 31 picked up a secondary affiiation with the fledgling Pax TV network, airing three hours of programming daily in the afternoon and early-evening hours until WPXJ-TV in Batavia was ready to broadcast.

Hampered by a weak signal early on, WNGS purchased a new transmitter in February 1998 in order to improve their reach. Two months later, WNGS sought approval to build a new 1,024-foot (312 m) transmitter tower in Colden, where WIVB-TV and WKBW-TV also had their towers, after successfully petitioning the FCC and the Canadian Radio-television and Telecommunications Commission (CRTC) to remove the channel 60 allocation at St. Catharines.

The matter was tabled by the town council more than a year later, on June 10, 1999, pending public comment. Although the Colden board favored co-location with an existing tower over constructing a new one, Powley claimed there was no space on either tower for WNGS to operate, and that co-location was not possible due to the digital updates required of WIVB-TV and WKBW-TV. Ultimately, on August 12, the town board voted 3–2 to deny an area variance to Powley and Smith, by then operating together as B&C Communications; one commissioner questioned the tower's capacity for ice load and wind speed. Residents testified about ice falling from the extant towers in Colden, while others were concerned about their aesthetic view being compromised were the channel 67 tower to be built; not a single resident came out in favor of the tower at the August 12 meeting.

=== Aborted sale to Granite Broadcasting; loss of UPN affiliation ===
On November 16, 1999, Granite Broadcasting, the owners of WKBW-TV, announced they would purchase WNGS from B&C for $23 million; the move came shortly after the FCC approved new rules allowing duopolies as long as a media market had at least eight alternative voices. Granite planned for improved syndicated programming plus the addition of a 10 p.m. WKBW-TV–produced newscast. Around that time, WNGS suffered from Nielsen ratings so low as to not be measureable by the company; Smith conceded the station—which could not even afford a subscription to Nielsen's metered ratings—had not turned a profit since signing on, despite $2.5 million in investments into WNGS. The following February, WNGS agreed to share the UPN affiliation with WONS-LP, a low-powered television station in Olean.

The sale was pushed back several times—first to March 20, then past mid-April—due to technical issues arising from WNGS's assigned digital channel, 46, with Granite waiting to ensure WNGS carried the same signal reach as its analog signal and whether Canadian authorities would accept construction of its digital facilities in Colden; tired of the delays, the deal fell through by mutual consent the following month. Powley and Smith told The Buffalo News three full-time employees had left WNGS since the sale announcement, leaving the couple to run the control room themselves.

In October 2001, two months after B&C made another attempt to relocate their transmitter, this time to Sardinia, UPN announced it would move its affiliation to upstart independent station WNLO upon the expiration of its existing affiliation agreement with WNGS after December 31, 2002, citing the need for a station with greater resources and a stronger presence in Buffalo. WNGS then reverted to independent station status, relying heavily on paid programming in addition to reruns.

== Equity/Daystar ownership: A station in limbo ==
=== Sale to Equity Broadcasting and RTN affiliation ===
In April 2004, B&C sold three of its stations—WNGS; WNYI in Ithaca, New York; and KWWF in Waterloo, Iowa—to the Equity Broadcasting Corporation for $10 million: Powley sold WNGS for $5 million and Smith sold WNYI and KWWF for $5 million, with $1 million from each deal contingent on approval of WNGS's proposed digital facilities from Colden, and improved service to Syracuse in the case of WNYI, both within three years. By February 2006, WNGS was airing classic TV programming from the Retro Television Network (RTN), programmed and transmitted from Equity's hub in Little Rock, Arkansas; the station also carried New York Yankees and New York Mets telecasts. That April, WNGS entered into a joint sales agreement with WKBW-TV; WKBW-TV produced programming, special news reports, and sports to air on WNGS.

On June 25, 2008, Equity Media, citing financial difficulties, sold RTN to Luken Communications for $18.5 million; Equity continued to provide services for RTN, including master control and distribution from Little Rock. On December 8, Equity filed for Chapter 11 bankruptcy, with creditors looking to convert it to an involuntary Chapter 7 liquidation; Silver Point Finance LLC had sought $41.5 million it had lent Equity and alleged that a Chapter 11 restructuring would leave Equity with insufficient cash to make payroll.

On January 4, 2009, a services contract conflict between Equity and Luken Communications caused Equity to pull RTN from its affiliates, including WNGS, forcing Luken to hastily put together its own operation center from its headquarters in Chattanooga, Tennessee. Henry Luken III, a former Equity executive in charge of Luken Communications, alleged that Equity had reneged on making payments to programming suppliers with the network revenues Equity had collected plus some of the proceeds Luken had paid Equity as a condition of the contract; Luken also alleged that, prior to the company's takeover of RTN's distribution, Equity had sent the company a 16,000-page PDF of playlists and commercial insertions to be entered into playlist control. After a brief period airing old movies, Equity affiliated WNGS with This TV later in January.

=== Sale to Daystar and subsequent shutdown ===
On April 16, 2009, Equity put 60 television stations up for auction in Dallas, Texas; the Word of God Fellowship, a Dallas-based religious broadcaster operating the Daystar Television Network, purchased 16 of Equity's stations, including WNGS, for $7.4 million. WKBW-TV's partnership with WNGS ended shortly thereafter.

WNGS ceased broadcasting on June 12, 2009—the mandated termination date for all existing analog television signals in the United States—when Daystar failed to construct its digital facilities on channel 7 by the deadline; not a single employee was assigned to oversee its construction. Daystar was ordered to put the station back on the air within one year or else lose the channel 67 license; the FCC forbade stations to remain dark for more than one year. In March 2010, with no sign of the station returning to air, Time Warner Cable, who had acquired Adelphia Communications in 2006, ended its hold on WNGS's channel 11 cable slot, replaced by WNLO.

=== Sale to Code 3 Broadcasting and return to air ===
In May 2010, Word of God Fellowship announced the sale of WNGS to Code 3 Broadcasting, a company formed by Philip A. Arno and Donald M. Angelo, for $2.75 million. Arno and Angelo were Buffalo broadcasting veterans: Arno started working at WKBW radio in 1969, later working at WUTV, WKBW-TV and WIVB-TV, primarily as a cameraman, and spending 18 years in the Los Angeles market; Angelo, who helped to launch WNYB-TV and the Niagara Frontier Sports Network, the production unit of the Buffalo Sabres NHL franchise, soon backed away from involvement with the purchase.

The proceeds for the channel 67 purchase came from a judgment in a lawsuit stemming from a helicopter crash that occurred on March 26, 2000, while Arno, then a freelance cameraman, was assigned by KTTV in Los Angeles to cover the end of the 72nd Academy Awards ceremony at the Shrine Auditorium. While Arno filmed celebrities leaving the auditorium around 10 p.m. that evening, the aircraft, an Aérospatiale AS350B, lost hydraulic pressure and began to spin downward toward the red carpet; pilot Kris Kelley was able to right the helicopter and pilot the craft back toward Van Nuys Airport, but upon arrival the craft disabled and crashed 50 feet (15 m) to the ground, bursting into flames. Crews of two other helicopters covering the ceremony and subsequently escorting the AS350B back to the airport, one filming for Entertainment Tonight and one filming for KTLA, helped the fuel-drenched Arno and Kelley out of the wreck. Arno, who suffered from a concussion and a shattered leg requiring multiple surgeries and effectively ending his career, filed suit against the owner and the operator of the helicopter and Kelley; Arno won a $13 million judgment in 2003, with his wife, Mary, receiving an additional $1 million in a separate suit.

The same month as the sale, Word of God finally built new digital facilities for WNGS, operating from a site 4 miles (6.4 km) north of Springville and bringing a clear signal to the wider Buffalo area, and returned the station to air, broadcasting Daystar programming in the interim; the transmitter was later found to be defective, and the transmitter was replaced in January 2012. After the deal was approved by the FCC that September, Arno re-affiliated the station with This TV; WNGS aired a package of New York Yankees games the following year. On November 3, WNGS returned to Buffalo-area Time Warner Cable systems on channel 5.

== WBBZ-TV: The Phil Arno era ==
I want to get a television station on the air that will connect with the people of Buffalo. In a perfect world, when people tune into my station they will either: laugh, cry or scratch their head and say: "Why didn't I know that?"

— Phil Arno

=== A quest for studios—and a plan for programming ===
With no studios for channel 67, Arno set about finding a new home for WNGS. The Eastern Hills Mall in Clarence had been Arno's third choice for a television station in Buffalo: the Studio Arena Theatre in Buffalo was initially considered, but talks failed after Studio Arena CEO and artistic director Kathleen Gaffney was dismissed in September 2008; Buffalo Central Terminal was also considered, but Arno balked due to the site's state of disrepair. Although operations were initially established at Eastern Hills in the summer of 2011, a lease dispute between Arno and the mall's owners in September concerning its planned studios put the station's future at the mall in doubt; the two parties came to a settlement the next month that cleared the way for construction of a 60-seat studio.

On August 1, 2011, Arno relaunched channel 67 as WBBZ-TV—"Buffalo Buzz"—changing its affiliation to MeTV, a network with a classic television format, which Arno sought to complement with original local programming; This TV moved to a digital subchannel. Initial programming ideas for WBBZ-TV included a morning show; a game show; a late-night talk show starring a local comedian; a local talk show in the vein of ABC's The View to feature broadcasting veterans Susan Hunt and Susan Banks; a program geared to the military; a video game review show; a local battle of the bands; a wine-tasting program; a weekly made-for-TV play; and a sports talk show to feature Buffalo Sabres veterans-turned-sportscasters Rob Ray and Danny Gare. Plans for sports programming included a high school game-of-the-week, Buffalo Bandits lacrosse, University at Buffalo football, and potentially a deal with the Sabres. Arno criticized local news production in Buffalo, calling it "filling air time. They do certain stories that are significant and important and then they throw in fender benders and abandoned buildings burning down that really isn't news just because they have to fill time. They don't necessarily have to be interesting."

The first local program that planned to air on WBBZ-TV, on October 29, was Buffalo Backstage, a music program featuring local and national artists; local inserts for the nationally syndicated morning show The Daily Buzz were to follow in January 2012. Bob Koshinski, former sports reporter for WKBW-TV and general manager of the Empire Sports Network, was hired in March 2012 as executive in charge of production and promotions; John DiSciullo, former news director at WKBW-TV and a near-thirty-year veteran of channel 7, joined WBBZ-TV in July as executive director of promotion and production. DiSciullo also appeared on-camera, replacing former WIVB-TV anchorman Mylous Hairston as the moderator of Political Buzz, the first original program taped at the Eastern Hills studio when it officially opened on June 18, 2012; and as the host of Bragging Rights!, a game show based on tic-tac-toe that debuted in 2014; the winning team received small prizes such as bacon-flavored toothpaste, plus an entry into a drawing for three big-screen television sets. Concurrent with DiSciullo's hiring was the announcement that Off Beat Cinema, the long-running camp movie showcase co-created by DiSciullo that had aired on WKBW-TV since 1993, would move to WBBZ-TV effective August 4, 2012.

=== Buffalo Night in America ===
Co-host Jim Brinson, who was ridiculously effusive all night, was right. We’ve probably never seen anything like it. And probably never will again.

— Alan Pergament

On July 21, 2012, WBBZ-TV hosted Buffalo Night in America, a food and music festival celebrating the city of Buffalo, at the Eastern Hills parking lot; around 7,000 to 10,000 people were expected to attend the festival. A three-hour live broadcast from the studio, hosted by Hairston and ex-Empire Sports Network personality Jim Brinson, aired on WBBZ-TV that evening, with live Skype feeds of "Buffalo parties" held across the country incorporated into the special.

The show was a technical, critical and ratings fiasco: the Skype feeds suffered from "distracting and incomprehensible video and audio of people either being ridiculous or inappropriate" while Hairston and Brinson remained oblivious to the technical issues, according to television critic Alan Pergament; the live remote from Denver, Colorado suffered from especially poor timing, as the live special was broadcast one day after the murder of twelve people at a movie theater in nearby Aurora. Towards the end of the broadcast, Buffalo radio personality Joey Reynolds, at the end of his reminisces to Arno and disc jockey Danny Neaverth about his teenage romances at Bishop Timon High School, produced a years-old chicken wing from his wallet. Buffalo Night in America averaged a lowly .2 rating—only about 1,000 Buffalo-area households.

In a post-mortem the following year, DiSciullo referred to Buffalo Night in America as a "training camp" for WBBZ-TV, while Arno defended its production as "an attempt to do something nice for the area. ...Criticism was valid but you never talked about the motivation behind it. ...I may do it again but I'm not going to do it until we can please the critics about production values."

=== Later original programming ===
The 2012–13 television season saw the addition of several new original programs: The Fred Jackson Show, a sports talk program co-hosted by Buffalo Bills running back Fred Jackson and Koshinski and featuring other Bills football players as guests; (Note: After Jackson was cut by the Bills after the 2014 NFL season, Bills wide receiver Robert Woods took over as host under the new title In the Zone, with Dave Jickster replacing Koshinski.) Sports Rap Up, later renamed All Sports WNY, hosted by Koshinski; and a television version of the nationally syndicated America's Car Show radio series hosted by Tom Torbjornsen. Secrets from Beyond, starring psychic Karyn Reece and hypnotist Robert Saviola, proved to be a success for WBBZ-TV, with shows at the Eastern Hills studio selling out at a cost of $10 per person. Despite its popularity, the show was canceled after six months due to the program's lack of revenue; Reece returned to WBBZ-TV in July 2017. The Bucky and Sully Show, starring The Buffalo News sports columnists Jerry Sullivan and Bucky Gleason, aired twice a week from fall 2013.

In 2014, Arno told Pergament in an interview he was seeking investors for WBBZ-TV; Arno said he had invested a further $3 million into channel 67 since its purchase, and that he had not once taken a salary ever since his ownership of the station; Arno had planned to start a news department with investor money, boldly claiming it would be the number-two news station in Buffalo. On January 30, 2015, Koshinski left WBBZ-TV in order to focus on his other businesses, although he continued to host All Sports WNY; Arno hired former WIVB-TV general manager Chris Musial to act as advisor the following month, and soon succeeded Koshinski as general manager and vice president.

WBBZ-TV dismissed Eddy Dobosiewicz, co-star of Off Beat Cinema, on April 29, 2015, in response to a disparaging tweet Dobosiewicz made in response to protests following the death in police custody of Freddie Gray Jr. in Baltimore, Maryland, calling the protestors "animals" and posting a picture of baboons climbing on a car; the upcoming episode of Off Beat Cinema was edited to have all traces of Dobosiewicz removed. The tweet also cost Dobosiewicz his position at WKBW-TV that same day; he had hosted the nostalgia segment "Queen City Chronicles" during the station's newscasts. In August 2015, the New York State Department of Labor ordered WBBZ-TV to pay $18,650 in unpaid overtime to its employees.

Polka Buzz, a dance program hosted by disc jockey and longtime polka host Ron Dombrowski of WXRL and WECK, debuted in October 2015. The program taped at various sites thirteen times a year; each taping was edited into four weekly episodes. On January 9, 2016, WBBZ-TV premiered a revival of the long-running WBEN-TV/WIVB-TV bowling series Beat the Champ with former WIVB-TV sports personality Paul Peck as host. The show ceased production in 2020 due to the COVID-19 pandemic, with its last new episode having aired on April 4; MSG Western New York revived the program again in 2024.

In August 2023, WBBZ entered into a joint sales agreement with WECK.

=== Good Deeds Buffalo ===
Good Deeds Buffalo, a program highlighting people creating positive change in Buffalo and in the Western New York area, first aired on WBBZ-TV on May 29, 2021, eleven days after its online premiere on YouTube; the program was hosted by Jordan James, a resident of North Tonawanda, who aspired to build the program on a national level. The program attracted national attention on March 28, 2022, when Drew Barrymore, having heard of James's show, invited James, who was waiting to be an audience member of Barrymore's talk show, onto the program to speak about Good Deeds Buffalo.

In April 2023, James announced he would pull Good Deeds Buffalo from WBBZ-TV following a Facebook post by Arno concerning transgender actress Dylan Mulvaney endorsing Bud Light beer during the 2023 NCAA Division I men's basketball tournament, wherein Arno referred to Mulvaney as "a guy pretending to be a woman" and also wrote, "If you think there is something destructive to our society and culture in this effort, than you should express that by avoiding their products." James, a gay man, accused Arno of being provocative in his remarks, and further stated that statements such as Arno's were hateful and targeted LGBTQ people, and that James would not associate himself with such comments. James re-launched the program on a national basis online the following year as Good Deeds America.

== Technical information ==
=== Subchannels ===
The station's signal is multiplexed:

Subchannels of WBBZ-TV
Subchannel	Res.	Short name	Programming
67.1	720p	WBBZ-DT	MeTV
67.2	480i	HEROESI	Heroes & Icons
67.3	480i	StoryTV	Story Television
67.4	480i	DAYSTAR	Daystar
67.5	480i	DABL	Dabl
67.6	480i	StartTV	Start TV
67.7	480i	Decades	Catchy Comedy
67.8	480i	Movies!	Movies!
