= KUTF =

Television station in Logan, Utah

- Logan–Salt Lake City, Utah; United States
- City: Logan, Utah
- Channels: Digital: 12 (VHF); Virtual: 12

Programming
- Affiliations: 12.1: Daystar; 12.2: Daystar Español; 12.3: Daystar Reflections

Ownership
- Owner: Daystar Television Network; (Word of God Fellowship, Inc.)

History
- First air date: January 1, 2001
- Former call signs: KUTH (2001–2004); KCBU (2004–2005)
- Former channel numbers: Analog: 12 (VHF, 2001–2009)
- Former affiliations: Univision (2001–2004); Independent (2004–2005); TeleFutura (2005–2009); Dark (2009−2010)
- Call sign meaning: Utah Telefutura; -or-; Univision Telefutura (former affiliations)

Technical information
- Licensing authority: FCC
- Facility ID: 69694
- ERP: 22.3 kW
- HAAT: 690 m (2,264 ft)
- Transmitter coordinates: 41°47′2.7″N 112°13′57.8″W

Links
- Public license information: Public file; LMS
- Website: www.daystar.com

KUTF (channel 12) is a religious television station licensed to Logan, Utah, United States, serving the Salt Lake City area. The station is owned by the Daystar Television Network. KUTF's transmitter is located on Cal Mountain near Tremonton, Utah.

== History ==
The channel 12 frequency in Logan previously belonged to KUSU-TV, a non-commercial educational station owned and operated by Utah State University which broadcast from 1964 to 1970. The KUTF calls were used previously from 1989 until 1992 for what is now KRCW-TV in Salem, Oregon, which serves the Portland market.

KUTF was founded June 9, 2000, by Equity Media Holdings and launched on January 1, 2001, as a Univision affiliate, then shifted to Univision's secondary network, TeleFutura (the current-day UniMás) in 2005. At one point, it was simulcast in Salt Lake City via low-power station K45GX in Salt Lake City. Equity co-managed the station with Provo-licensed KCBU (now KUTH-DT, channel 32), which was owned by Univision itself but operated by Equity.

KUTF was part of a lot of stations sold at auction to Daystar on April 16, 2009, along with sister station KCBU in Price, which originally operated as a KUTF simulcast but by 2005, took on several English-language networks operated by Equity. On the digital transition date of June 12, the station's analog transmitter went dark. Univision then purchased KUTH outright, and transitioned TeleFutura in the market to that station's second subchannel.

Daystar completed KUTF's digital facilities before the June 12, 2010, deadline to resume operations, and went on the air with Daystar programming on April 21. Daystar decided to pursue pay-TV coverage across Utah with KUTF rather than bring KCBU back on the air, and that station's license was canceled on July 6 of the same year.

== Technical information ==
=== Subchannels ===
The station's signal is multiplexed:

Subchannels of KUTF
Subchannel	Res.	Short name	Programming
12.1	1080i	DAYSTAR	Daystar
12.2	720p	ESPANOL	Daystar Español
12.3	480i	DAYSTAR	Daystar Reflections

=== Analog-to-digital conversion ===
Because it was granted an original construction permit after the FCC finalized the DTV allotment plan on April 21, 1997, the station did not receive a companion channel for a digital television station. Instead, at the end of the digital TV conversion period for full-service stations, KUTF turned off its analog signal on June 12, 2009, and resumed broadcasting on the same channel with a digital signal (called a "flash-cut"), though it stayed dark until April 21, 2010, when Daystar activated its digital channel.
