= KWBM =

Television station in Harrison, Arkansas

- Harrison, Arkansas; Springfield, Missouri; United States
- City: Harrison, Arkansas
- Channels: Digital: 31 (UHF); Virtual: 31
- Branding: Daystar

Programming
- Affiliations: 31.1: Daystar; 31.2: Daystar Español; 31.3: Daystar Reflections

Ownership
- Owner: Daystar Television Network; (Word of God Fellowship, Inc.)

History
- Founded: May 22, 1998
- First air date: January 26, 2001
- Former channel numbers: Analog: 31 (UHF, 2001–2009)
- Former affiliations: The WB (2001–2006); MyNetworkTV (2006–2009); 49.1: Fox (via KRBK, until 2020); 49.2: MeTV (via KRBK, until 2020)
- Call sign meaning: The WB Missouri (reflecting former affiliation)

Technical information
- Licensing authority: FCC
- Facility ID: 78314
- ERP: 191 kW
- HAAT: 339 m (1,112 ft)
- Transmitter coordinates: 36°42′18″N 93°3′46″W

Links
- Public license information: Public file; LMS
- Website: www.daystar.com

KWBM (channel 31) is a religious television station licensed to Harrison, Arkansas, United States, serving the Springfield, Missouri, area. Owned by the Daystar Television Network, it is the only full-power television station in the Springfield market that is licensed in Arkansas. KWBM's offices are located on Enterprise Avenue in southeast Springfield, and its transmitter is located in rural Taney County, just northeast of Forsyth.

== History ==
Logo as a WB affiliate, used from 2001 to 2006.

The station first signed on the air on January 26, 2001; it originally served as the market's affiliate of The WB. The station was founded by the Equity Broadcasting Corporation. Prior to the station's sign-on, southwestern Missouri residents could only receive WB network programs on cable and satellite through Chicago-based superstation WGN, which carried WB programming nationally from the network's launch on January 11, 1995; the network was unavailable in the market between the period when WGN dropped WB programming in October 1999 and KWBM launched. The station formerly operated two low-power translator stations: KBBL-CA (channel 56, later KBBL-LP) in Springfield (which adopted the calls on July 14, 2006; coincidentally, the KBBL calls were used fictionally as the radio station in the fictional town of Springfield on the animated series The Simpsons), and KNJE-LP (channel 58) in Aurora.

On January 24, 2006, the Warner Bros. unit of Time Warner and CBS Corporation announced that the two companies would shut down The WB and UPN and combine the networks' respective programming to create a new "fifth" network called The CW. One month later on February 22, 2006, News Corporation announced the launch of a new "sixth" network called MyNetworkTV, which would be operated by Fox Television Stations and its syndication division Twentieth Television. Equity refused in full to affiliate their stations with The CW due to the network's carriage costs, handing the affiliation to UPN affiliate K15CZ (channel 15); KWBM thus became the market's MyNetworkTV affiliate when the network launched on September 5, 2006.

On December 8, 2008, Equity Media Holdings filed for Chapter 11 bankruptcy protection; it then began to sell off its television station properties. KWBM was sold to at auction to religious broadcaster Daystar in early 2009; the MyNetworkTV affiliation later moved to upstart station KRBK (channel 49; now a Fox affiliate) when that station launched on August 1, 2009.

== Technical information ==
=== Subchannels ===
The station's digital signal is multiplexed:

Subchannels of KWBM
Subchannel	Res.	Short name	Programming
31.1	1080i	KWBM-HD	Daystar
31.2	720p	KWBM-ES	Daystar Español
31.3	480i	KWBM-SD	Daystar Reflections

Daystar leased the second and third subchannels of KWBM to Nexstar Media Group (formerly Koplar Communications) to extend the signal coverage of Fox affiliate KRBK, which until 2018 did not cover Springfield proper with its main signal licensed to Osage Beach, Missouri. What would usually be channel 31.2 instead remapped as a virtual channel to KRBK's channel 49.1. KWBM also broadcast KRBK's MeTV subchannel as 49.2. This arrangement ended in 2020 with the launch of the Daystar Español channel on KWBM-DT2. KRBK has since moved to the Fordland antenna farm.

=== Analog-to-digital conversion ===
Because it was granted an original construction permit after the Federal Communications Commission (FCC) finalized the DTV allotment plan on April 21, 1997, the station did not receive a companion channel for its digital signal. Instead, at the end of the digital conversion period for full-power television stations, On June 12, 2009, KWBM would have been required to turn off its analog signal and turn on its digital signal (called a "flash-cut") almost one month later on July 3.

The termination of KWBM's analog signal resulted in the station being dropped from satellite providers Dish Network and DirecTV, due to the lack of unique local programming from the main Daystar national feed, and a revocation of the station's retransmission consent agreement after the sale from Equity to Daystar. Mediacom, Suddenlink and Charter Spectrum continue to receive a direct satellite feed of the station, and Daystar maintains carriage of the station on those systems via must-carry declaration.

KBBL-LP and KNJE-LP, as low-power stations, were not required to cease analog transmissions upon the 2009 transition deadline, but were required to move their channel positions as their channel allocations were among the high band UHF channels (52–69) that were removed from broadcasting use as a result of the transition. These stations were not sold to Daystar as part of its purchase of KWBM. The FCC cancelled KNJE-LP's license on August 6, 2010, and deleted the KNJE-LP call sign from its database; KBBL is currently dark with a construction permit to build digital transmitter facilities on UHF channel 24.
