= KTVY =

KTVY may refer to:

- Tooele Valley Airport in Tooele, Utah (ICAO code KTVY)
- KEGS (TV), a television station (channel 7) licensed to Goldfield, Nevada, United States, which held the call sign KTVY-TV from March 2002 to May 2005
- KEGS-LP, a defunct low-power television station (channel 30) licensed to Las Vegas, Nevada, which held the call sign KTVY-LP from August 1997 to May 2005
- KFOR-TV, a television station (channel 4) licensed to Oklahoma City, Oklahoma, United States, which held the call sign KTVY from 1976 to 1990
