= KJJC =

KJJC may refer to:

- KJJC (AM), a radio station (1230 AM) licensed to serve Murray, Utah, United States
- KJJC-TV, a television station (channel 17, virtual 16) licensed to serve Great Falls, Montana, United States
- KJJC-LD, a low-power television station (channel 7) licensed to serve Helena, Montana
