= KEGS (TV) =

Television station in Goldfield, Nevada (2002–2009)

Goldfield, Nevada; United States
- Channels: Analog: 7 (VHF)

Programming
- Affiliations: ImaginAsian (2004–2007); RTN (2007–January 2009); Independent (2002–2004, January–June 2009)

Ownership
- Owner: Equity Media Holdings Corporation; (Nevada Channel 3, Inc.)

History
- First air date: April 11, 2002
- Last air date: June 12, 2009; (7 years, 62 days)
- Former call signs: KTVY-TV (2002–2005)
- Call sign meaning: Equity Goldfield Station

Technical information
- Facility ID: 86201
- ERP: 22.9 kW
- HAAT: 448 m (1,470 ft)
- Transmitter coordinates: 38°3′5″N 117°13′33″W
- Translator(s): KEGS-LP 30 Las Vegas; KRRI-LP 43 Reno

KEGS (channel 7) was an independent television station in Goldfield, Nevada, United States. It served both the Reno and Las Vegas markets by way of translators KRRI-LP (channel 25) in Reno and KEGS-LP (channel 30) in Las Vegas. Like many stations that were owned by Equity Broadcasting, the stations were operated remotely by satellite; their programming could be seen free-to-air on Galaxy 18.

== History ==
The Las Vegas station was founded on January 12, 1993, as K63FD, and later gained the call sign KTVY-LP in 1997. In April 2002, the Goldfield station signed on as KTVY-TV, matching the station in Las Vegas. Finally, in late May 2005, both stations changed their call sign to KEGS.

Until May 30, 2007, KEGS was affiliated with ImaginAsian. On that day, the station switched to the Retro Television Network (RTN).

On January 4, 2009, a contract conflict between Equity Media Holdings Corporation and RTN interrupted the programming on many RTN affiliates. As a result, Luken Communications, LLC (who had purchased RTN in June 2008), restored a national RTN feed from its headquarters in Chattanooga, Tennessee, with individual customized feeds to non-Equity-owned affiliates to follow on a piecemeal basis. As a result, KEGS lost its RTN affiliation immediately, though Luken vowed to find a new affiliate for RTN in the Las Vegas market. Viewers in the Reno area could still watch RTN on the digital subchannel of local Fox affiliate KRXI-TV, while KGNG-LP's DT4 subchannel took the affiliation in Las Vegas in June 2009.

At auction on April 16, 2009, KEGS-LP was sold to Mako Communications, while KRRI-LP and KELM-LP were sold to Ngensolutions LLC. In June 2013, Mako planned to sell what had become KEGS-LD to Landover 5 LLC as part of a larger deal involving 51 other low-power television stations; the deal fell through in June 2016, and in 2017 Mako's stations, including KEGS-LD, were acquired by HC2 Holdings. The full-service KEGS signal never found a buyer, and signed off permanently on June 12, 2009; its license was finally canceled on July 6, 2010.

== Digital television ==
Because it was granted an original construction permit after the FCC finalized the DTV allotment plan on April 21, 1997, the station did not receive a companion channel for a digital television station. Instead, at the end of the digital TV conversion period for full-service stations, KEGS would have been required to turn off its analog signal and turn on its digital signal (called a "flash-cut").

The station's owner, Equity Media Holdings, declared bankruptcy in 2008 and was unable to construct digital facilities, leaving the station to go dark in 2009. According to the station's DTV status report, "On December 8, 2008, the licensee's parent corporation filed a petition for bankruptcy relief under Chapter 11 of the federal bankruptcy code... This station must obtain post-petition financing and court approval before digital facilities may be constructed. The station must cease analogue broadcasting on February 17, 2009, regardless of whether digital facilities are operational by that date. The station will file authority to remain silent if so required by the FCC."

While the DTV Delay Act extended this deadline to June 12, 2009, Equity had applied for an extension of the digital construction permit in order to retain the broadcast license after the station became silent. Equity Broadcasting also held a construction permit to construct a digital companion station to KEGS-LP on channel 24 in Las Vegas; that station, as a low-power broadcasting operation, was not required to cease analog transmission due to DTV transition in 2009.

While the majority of Equity's assets were sold in a 2009 liquidation, neither the digital KEGS transmitter nor the new Las Vegas station were ever constructed.
