= Adversary proceeding in bankruptcy (United States) =

Type of lawsuit

An adversary proceeding in bankruptcy is a type of lawsuit in the American legal system. It is distinguished from other suits by being filed in a United States bankruptcy court in connection with a larger bankruptcy proceeding.

== Procedure ==
Adversary proceedings are governed by certain court rules found in Part VII of the Federal Rules of Bankruptcy Procedure and, in part, by the Federal Rules of Civil Procedure. A bankruptcy case may contain one or more adversary proceedings or (most commonly) none at all.

Other than their connection to a bankruptcy proceeding, adversary proceedings are largely similar to a standard lawsuit in federal district court. The suit is opened by a complaint filed with the Bankruptcy Court, and proceeds through the same stages of litigation, including discovery and trial (including jury trial in appropriate cases). The adversary proceeding may address claims to do with federal or state law, or in rare cases other law, as well. The only limitation is that the suit must have some bearing on the liabilities or assets of the bankrupt debtor or the debtor's discharge.

Adversary proceedings may be filed by the bankruptcy trustee or by other parties. For example, a creditor may file an adversary proceeding to object to the debtor's discharge. Or, a debtor may commence an adversary proceeding against a creditor as a response to a violation of the automatic stay. Very commonly, the debtor-in-possession in a Chapter 11 reorganization of a business debtor will initiate adversary proceedings against a party with whom the debtor had an executory contract, against whom it had a claim in tort, or to whom it made a preferential transfer prior to filing for bankruptcy, intending to collect funds to maximize working assets.

An adversary proceeding is more formal than a contested matter. A contested matter in bankruptcy is governed by Rule 9014 of the Federal Rules of Bankruptcy Procedure.

A debtor can attempt to discharge student loans through bankruptcy by use of the adversary proceeding.

== See also ==
- Bankruptcy in the United States
