= WTMS-CA =

Minneapolis–Saint Paul, Minnesota; United States
- City: Minneapolis, Minnesota
- Channels: Analog: 7 (VHF)

Programming
- Affiliations: ShopNBC, Daystar, Telefutura

Ownership
- Owner: Silver Point Capital; (SP Minneapolis LLC)

History
- Founded: 2006
- Last air date: 2009

Technical information
- Licensing authority: FCC
- Facility ID: 69799
- Class: CA
- ERP: 0.405 kW
- Transmitter coordinates: 44°58′34″N 93°16′21″W

Links
- Public license information: Public file; LMS

WTMS-CA (channel 7) was a low-power, Class A television station licensed to Minneapolis, Minnesota, United States, which served the Twin Cities area. Owned by Silver Point Capital of Greenwich, Connecticut, it was affiliated with Telefutura, making it one of two Spanish-language television stations in Minnesota, alongside sister station and Univision affiliate WUMN-LP (channel 13). It had also aired the Daystar Television Network, and been a ShopNBC affiliate.

On June 25, 2008, Equity disclosed that it was selling WTMS to Luken Communications, LLC.

Equity Media Holdings has been in Chapter 11 bankruptcy since December 2008 and offers by Luken Communications to acquire Equity-owned stations in six markets have since been withdrawn.

WTMS was sold at auction to Silver Point Capital on April 16, 2009. The sale closed on August 17, 2009; just a week later, on August 25, the station's license was canceled. As of February 7, 2010, however, WTMS-LD, a construction permit for a digital companion channel, remained active. This construction permit has since expired and the station is now listed as DWTMS, and is marked for deletion from the FCC database.
