= KUTH-DT =

Television station in Provo, Utah

- Provo–Salt Lake City, Utah; United States
- City: Provo, Utah
- Channels: Digital: 32 (UHF); Virtual: 32
- Branding: Univision 32; UniMás 32.2; Noticias 32 Salt Lake City (newscasts)

Programming
- Affiliations: 32.1: Univision; 32.2: UniMás; for others, see § Technical information and subchannels

Ownership
- Owner: TelevisaUnivision; (Univision Salt Lake City LLC)

History
- First air date: April 17, 2003
- Former call signs: KCBU (2003–2004); KUTH (2004–2009)
- Former channel number: Analog: 32 (UHF, 2003–2009)
- Former affiliations: America's Collectibles Network (2003–2004)
- Call sign meaning: Utah; -or-; Univision Utah

Technical information
- Licensing authority: FCC
- Facility ID: 81451
- ERP: 194 kW
- HAAT: 812 m (2,664 ft)
- Transmitter coordinates: 40°16′45″N 111°56′3″W
- Translator(s): see § Translators

Links
- Public license information: Public file; LMS
- Website: www.univision.com/local/salt-lake-city-kuth

KUTH-DT (channel 32) is a television station licensed to Provo, Utah, United States, broadcasting the Spanish-language Univision and UniMás networks to Salt Lake City and the state of Utah. The station is owned and operated by TelevisaUnivision and maintains studios on West Amelia Earhart Drive in the northwestern section of Salt Lake City; its transmitter is located west of Orem, in the Lake Mountains.

== History ==
The station first signed on the air on April 17, 2003, as KCBU, owned by Cocola Broadcasting. By September, when it was added to Comcast cable systems on the Wasatch Front, it was airing the home shopping service America's Collectibles Network. Univision Communications bought the station in October 2004 and entered into an outsourcing agreement with Equity Broadcasting (which Univision's principals held a stake in at the time) to operate the station. At that time, channel 32 swapped affiliations and call signs with what was then KUTH (Utah's original full-power Univision affiliate on channel 12, licensed to Logan, Utah, which became KUTF in 2005) and became the new Univision affiliate.

When Univision sold the last of its shares in Equity Broadcasting in 2007, KUTH was supposed to go to Equity outright; however, the transfer of KUTH from Univision to Equity never materialized. Later, Univision planned to purchase KUTF to create a duopoly with KUTH but cancelled its plans shortly after Newport Television announced the sale of its Salt Lake City duopoly to High Plains Broadcasting; by that time, private-equity firm Providence Equity Partners owned sizable stakes in both Univision and Newport Television. This cancellation resulted in Newport Television retaining ownership of KTVX (channel 4) and selling only KUCW (channel 30) to High Plains Broadcasting (with Newport Television continuing to control both of those stations).

Under Equity's management of the station, all of KUTH's programming originated from Equity's master control hub at the company's headquarters in Little Rock, Arkansas. This arrangement ended on June 12, 2009, as part of the completion of the digital television transition, at which time Univision took over the operations of KUTH outright.

== News operation ==
Under Equity's management of the station, and while it was on channel 12, KUTH began airing weeknight newscasts at 5 and 10 p.m. in 2003. The newscasts were produced from a facility in Iowa, with reports filed by two Salt Lake City-based reporters. Later, production shifted to an Equity-owned facility in Little Rock, Arkansas, which produced newscasts for Univision affiliates in six states. The newscasts were canceled in June 2008, after Equity instituted a companywide suspension of news programs on its Univision-affiliated stations. Local newscasts returned on September 30, 2013, when Univision launched weeknight 5 and 10 p.m. newscasts branded Noticias 32 Salt Lake City.

== Technical information and subchannels ==
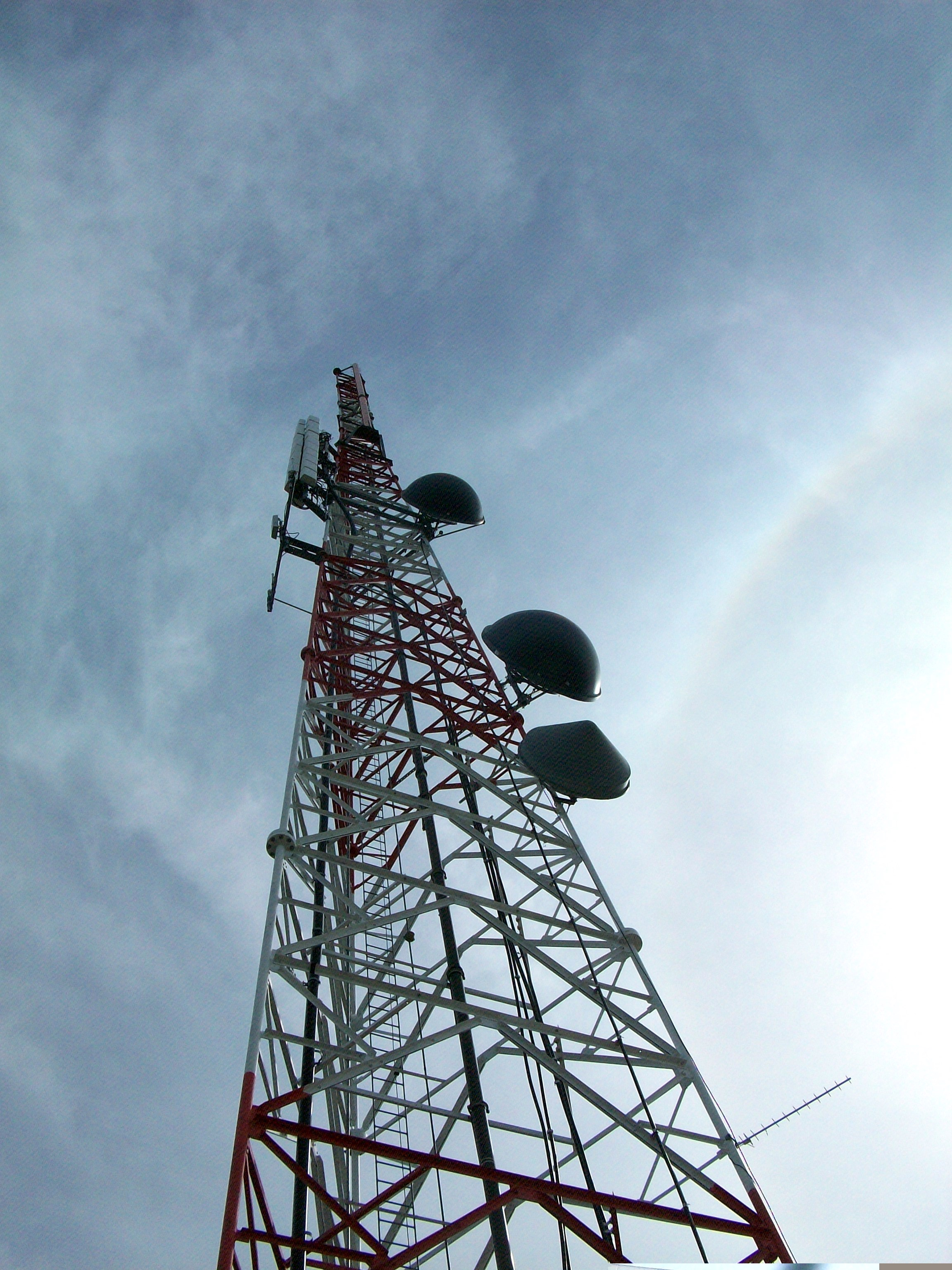
The broadcast tower for KUTH atop Lake Mountain.

KUTH-DT's transmitter is located west of Orem, in the Lake Mountains. The station's signal is multiplexed:

Subchannels of KUTH-DT
Subchannel	Res.	Short name	Programming
32.1	1080i	KUTH-DT	Univision
32.2	1080i	Unimas	UniMás
32.3	480i	GetTV	Great (4:3)
32.4	480i	Quest	Quest
32.5	480i	CRIME	True Crime Network
32.6	480i	Nosey	Nosey
32.7	480i	MSGold	MovieSphere Gold
32.8	480i	BT2	Infomercials

Subchannel broadcast with MPEG-4 video

=== Translators ===
- K29KD-D Delta
- K31ON-D Fillmore, etc.
- K18MW-D Leamington
- K16MU-D Scipio

=== Analog-to-digital conversion ===
Because it was granted an original construction permit after the FCC finalized the DTV allotment plan on April 21, 1997, the station did not receive a companion channel for a digital television station. Instead, KUTH shut down its analog signal, over UHF channel 32. The station "flash-cut" its digital signal into operation UHF channel 32. On June 23, all Univision–owned full-service stations, including KUTH, added the "-DT" suffix to their legal call signs.
