= KUKC-LD =

Television station in Kansas City, Missouri

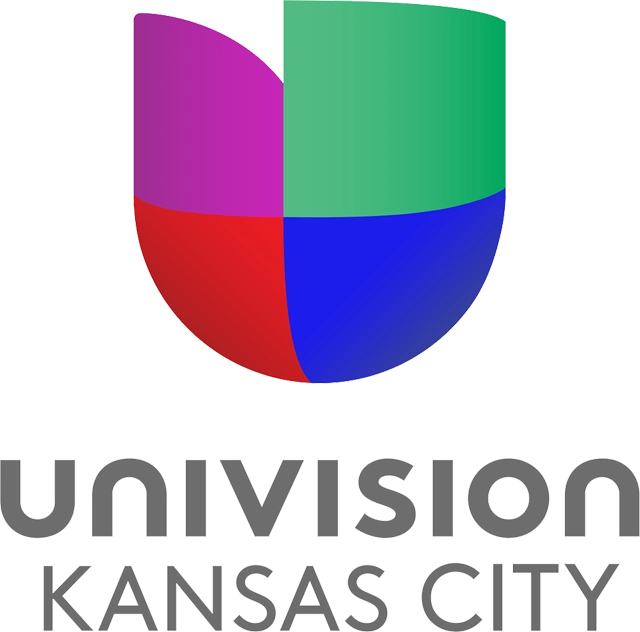
- Kansas City, Missouri; United States
- Channels: Digital: 14 (UHF); Virtual: 14
- Branding: Univision Kansas City

Programming
- Affiliations: 14.1: Univision; for others, see § Subchannels

Ownership
- Owner: Bridge Media Networks; (Bridge News LLC)

History
- First air date: August 28, 1989
- Former call signs: K29CF (1989–1997); K48FS (1997–2005); KUKC-LP (2005–2013)
- Former channel numbers: Analog: 29 (UHF, 1989–1996); Digital: 20 (UHF, until 2020); Virtual: 48 (until 2018), 20 (2018–2024)
- Former affiliations: ValueVision / ShopNBC (1991–2005)
- Call sign meaning: Univision Kansas City

Technical information
- Licensing authority: FCC
- Facility ID: 191352
- Class: LD
- ERP: 15 kW
- HAAT: 259.8 m (852 ft)
- Transmitter coordinates: 39°4′24″N 94°29′7″W

Links
- Public license information: LMS
- Website: www.univisionkansascity.com

KUKC-LD (channel 14) is a low-power television station in Kansas City, Missouri, United States, affiliated with the Spanish-language network Univision. The station is owned by Bridge Media Networks. KUKC-LD's offices and master control facilities are located on West 31st Street in the Westside South section of Kansas City, Missouri, and its transmitter is located near 27th Street in the city's Western Blue Township section.

Until 2018 when KGKC-LD started carrying Telemundo, KUKC had the distinction of being the only standalone Spanish-language television station in the Kansas City market (KSMO-TV (channel 62) carried MundoMax on its second digital subchannel before that network's shutdown in late November 2016), but remains the only Univision network affiliate in the state of Missouri.

== History ==
ValueVision station ID for KUKC's predecessor, K29CF.

Logo introduced on the station's former website.

The station first signed on the air in 1989 as K29CF; it originally operated as an affiliate of the home shopping network ValueVision. To allow full-power outlet KCWB (channel 29, now KCWE) to sign on the air, the station relocated to UHF channel 48 in 1996, and changed its callsign to K48FS. It remained a ValueVision affiliate, however it also carried children's programming during the afternoon hours (such as The Flintstones and Mighty Max).

Station identification card in Equity era; all Equity Univision stations featured the same layout for their on-air IDs.

In 2004, the station was purchased by Equity Media Holdings. Shortly after it was finalized, in January 2005, the station became the market's Univision affiliate; reflecting this, its callsign was changed to KUKC-LP (for "Univision Kansas City"). On December 8, 2008, Equity Media Holdings filed for Chapter 11 bankruptcy protection; it then began to sell off its television station properties. KUKC was sold to SP Television on June 2, 2009. The sale closed on August 17, 2009. SP Television reached a deal to sell KUKC to Media Vista Group on December 21, 2012.

On September 18, 2023, it was announced that KUKC-LD and sister station WUMN-LD in Minneapolis would be sold to Bridge News LLC, led by investor Manoj Bhargava, for $2.25 million; the sale does not include the stations' Univision affiliations. The sale was completed on March 1, 2024.

== Subchannels ==
The station's signal is multiplexed:

Subchannels of KUKC-LD
Subchannel	Res.	Short name	Programming
14.1	1080i	KUKC	Univision
14.2	480i	ShopHQ	ShopHQ
14.3	480i	Bridge1	Infomercials
14.4	480i	BiNGE	Binge TV
14.5	480i	AceTV	Ace TV
14.6	480i	OAN	One America Plus
14.7	480i	beIN-SP	beIN Sports Xtra en Español
14.8	480i	Sales	Infomercials (4:3)
14.9	480i	BarkTV	Bark TV
14.10	480i	RNTV	Right Now TV
14.11	480i	FTF	FTF Sports
14.12	480i	MTRSPR1	MtrSpt1
14.13	480i	AWE	AWE Plus
14.14	480i	NBTV	National Black TV
14.15	480i	beIN	beIN Sports Xtra
14.16	480i	Outdoor	Outdoor America
