= KLMN =

Television station in Great Falls, Montana (2000–2003)

Great Falls, Montana; United States
- Channels: Analog: 26 (UHF)
- Branding: Fox Montana

Programming
- Affiliations: Defunct

Ownership
- Owner: Equity Media Holdings; (Montana License Subsidiary, Inc.)

History
- Founded: December 19, 2000
- First air date: June 11, 2003
- Last air date: June 12, 2009; (6 years, 1 day)
- Former affiliations: Fox (2003–2005 and 2007–2009); UPN (2003–2006; secondary until 2005); MyNetworkTV (2006–2007)
- Call sign meaning: Great Falls, Montana (can also be consecutive letters in alphabet)

Technical information
- Facility ID: 81331
- ERP: 355 kW
- HAAT: 65.1 m (214 ft)
- Transmitter coordinates: 47°32′23.3″N 111°17′8.1″W

KLMN (channel 26) was a television station in Great Falls, Montana, United States, affiliated with the Fox network. The station was owned by Equity Media Holdings.

== History ==
Founded on December 19, 2000, KLMN signed on in mid-2003 as a Fox affiliate, with additional programming from UPN. When Helena-based NBC affiliate KTVH bought a low-power repeater station in the Great Falls area in 2005, it caused an affiliation shake-up. Long-time NBC affiliate KTGF (now KJJC-TV) became an affiliate of Fox, leaving KLMN with only UPN programming. KLMN became a MyNetworkTV affiliate in September 2006. In May 2007, Fox programming abruptly returned to KLMN after nearly two years on KTGF, which might have been coincidental with KTGF's parent, Destiny Communications, entering a Joint Sales Agreement with KLMN.

The KLMN callsign was once used by what is now KFTA-TV in Fort Smith, Arkansas. Coincidentally, KLMN was not the only station in Great Falls whose callsign was once used in Arkansas, as its competitor KRTV carries the callsign of a now-defunct station in Little Rock, Equity Media Holdings' hometown.

In 2007, a Federal Communications Commission (FCC) inquiry was launched to determine whether Equity's control of KLMN violated the multiple ownership rules; a local competitor subsequently filed a petition to deny the station's license renewal application. Processing of other FCC license assignment and modification applications involving Equity had been delayed pending resolution of these issues.

Because it was granted an original construction permit after the FCC finalized the DTV allotment plan on April 21, 1997, the station did not receive a companion channel for a digital television station. Instead, at the end of the digital TV conversion period for full-service stations, KLMN would have had to turn off its analog signal and turn on its digital signal (called a "flash-cut"). However, according to the station's DTV status report, "On December 8, 2008, the licensee's parent corporation filed a petition for bankruptcy relief under Chapter 11 of the federal bankruptcy code... This station must obtain post-petition financing and court approval before digital facilities may be constructed. The station will cease analogue broadcasting on February 17, 2009, regardless of whether digital facilities are operational by that date. The station will file authority to remain silent if so required by the FCC."

While the DTV Delay Act extended this deadline to June 12, 2009, Equity applied for an extension of the digital construction permit in order to retain the broadcast license until the station could be sold. The company had also applied to operate at reduced power (50 kW).

At auction on April 16, 2009, Max Media bought the programming assets (but not the broadcasting facilities) of KLMN and the rest of Equity's Montana Fox station system. On July 13, Max Media established a new Fox affiliate on the digital subchannel of its ABC affiliate in Great Falls, KFBB; it was originally planned to launch on July 1. In the meantime, KLMN shut down as scheduled on June 12, 2009, and Equity fully returned the licenses of KLMN and the company's other Fox affiliated Montana stations to the FCC, who then deleted the licenses and their corresponding call signs.

During the interim period between the shutdown of KLMN and the launch of the KFBB subchannel, Fox programming was available only through the local cable system, Bresnan Communications, by arrangement with Equity.
