= Retro Jams =

US MusicVideo Network

- Type: Music video channel/programming block
- Country: United States
- Availability: National
- Owner: Equity Media Holdings Corporation
- Launch date: December 2007; 18 years ago
- Dissolved: August 2009; 16 years ago

Retro Jams was a music video network that played music videos from the 1960s, 1970s, 1980s, and early 1990s, with the vast majority of clips used in the public domain to reduce and avoid performance and rights fees. Established in 2007, it was owned and operated by now-defunct Equity Media Holdings. Retro Jams was formerly carried full-time as a free-to-air TV channel on various Equity-owned terrestrial low-power television stations nationwide. Blocks of programming on sister network Retro Television Network also featured Retro Jams, either with videos pre-programmed or requested live by viewers.

== History ==
Retro Jams was established by Equity Media Holdings as a filler format to provide music video programming to a few individual, local Equity-owned stations which lacked a conventional television network affiliation. Programming consisted primarily of music videos from the 1980s and early 1990s.

On most of these stations, Equity replaced Retro Jams with the Retro Television Network in mid-2008. As Equity had founded RTN and owned the network until 2008, the "Retro Jams" name continued in use as a programming block name, along with certain hours being by viewer request. While most affected stations simply replaced Retro Jams with Retro TV, a few stations went to other networks.

Cash-strapped Equity Media Holdings sold Retro Television Network to Luken Communications in June 2008 and entered federal chapter 11 bankruptcy protection in Little Rock, Arkansas, in December 2008. An option allowing Equity to re-purchase Retro TV from Luken expired unexercised on December 24, 2008. Equity continued to provide broadcast automation facilities and operate Retro TV from its Little Rock, Arkansas centralcasting facility on behalf of Luken Communications until January 2009, when Equity's failure to pay the studios supplying Retro TV programming caused Luken Communications to move Retro TV to independent facilities.

Retro TV was permanently removed from all Equity-owned or operated stations on January 4, 2009. Some Retro TV stations had networks such as This TV or a public domain schedule compiled by Equity as a replacement, though many had a resurrection of Retro Jams placed on the channel space to provide some form of programming to the remaining Equity-owned stations. This all-music video format continued until Equity's bankruptcy in the middle of 2009, and most of its stations were either sold at auction or closed permanently shortly thereafter.
