= WNYI =

Television station in Ithaca, New York

WNYI and WDSS-LD
WNYI: Ithaca, New York; WDSS-LD: Syracuse, New York; United States
- Channels for WNYI: Digital: 13 (VHF); Virtual: 52
- Channels for WDSS-LD: Digital: 13 (VHF); Virtual: 38

Programming
- Affiliations: 52.1: Daystar; 38.2: Daystar Español; 52.3: Daystar Reflections

Ownership
- Owner: Daystar Television Network; (Word of God Fellowship, Inc.)

History
- First air date: WNYI: 2002
- Former channel number: WNYI: Analog: 52 (UHF, 2002–2009); Digital: 20 (UHF, 2009–2019)
- Former affiliations: WNYI: Univision (2002–2009)
- Call sign meaning: WNYI: New York Ithaca; WDSS-LD: Daystar Syracuse

Technical information
- Licensing authority: FCC
- Facility ID: WNYI: 34329; WDSS-LD: 47688
- Class: WDSS-LD: LD
- ERP: 28 kW
- HAAT: 260 m (853 ft)
- Transmitter coordinates: 42°48′5.2″N 76°26′12.8″W

Links
- Public license information: WNYI: Public file; LMS; WDSS-LD: Public file; LMS
- Website: www.daystar.com

WNYI (channel 52) is a religious television station licensed to Ithaca, New York, United States, serving the Elmira, Binghamton and Syracuse television markets. The station is owned by the Daystar Television Network. WNYI's transmitter is located on Quarry Road in Moravia, New York. It shares its channel and tower with co-owned WDSS-LD, a low-power translator station that previously broadcast on UHF channel 38 from a transmitter in Onondaga.

== History ==
The original construction permit was issued to "Ithaca 52 Inc." in December 1999, valid for three years, with the first program tests run in late 2002 to meet a Federal Communications Commission (FCC) deadline. The initial broadcast consisted of 26 kW of color bars from a tower location near Ithaca College.

The station was sold to Caroline Pawley in June 2003 and to Equity Broadcasting in 2004; as a Univision affiliate, it had been fed remotely via satellite from Equity's central automated satellite hub in Little Rock, Arkansas, since 2004. WNYI, licensed as a full service station despite its low signal power terrestrially, had applied for must-carry access to Time Warner Cable in Syracuse in May 2005. While Ithaca is nominally in the Syracuse market area, the terrestrial WNYI signal had always been inadequate to reach Syracuse or other communities outside of Ithaca itself. The station had made various applications for an increase in licensed power but no decisions had been made by the FCC on these requests.

WNYI was the only full-service television station in upstate New York to provide Spanish language programming.

At auction on April 16, 2009, Daystar bought WNYI, pending approval by the U.S. Bankruptcy Court. Daystar changed programming to its namesake network. Univision's national feed was quickly returned to Time Warner Cable (now Spectrum), causing little to no impact for viewers, and due to various technical issues which often plagued Equity's stations, steadied the area's access to the network.

== Technical information ==
=== Subchannels ===
Subchannels of WNYI and WDSS-LD
License	Subchannel	Res.	Short name	Programming
WNYI	52.1	1080i	WNYI-HD	Daystar
WNYI	52.2	480i	WNYI-SD	Daystar Reflections
WDSS-LD	38.2	480i	WDSS-ES	Daystar Español

=== Analog-to-digital conversion ===
WNYI shut down its analog signal, over UHF channel 52, and "flash-cut" its digital signal into operation to UHF channel 20, using virtual channel 52. Because it was granted an original construction permit after the FCC finalized the DTV allotment plan on April 21, 1997, the station did not receive a companion channel for a digital television station.

Both the ability of WNYI to transition to digital and its ability to continue broadcasting were directly jeopardized as on December 8, 2008, the licensee's parent corporation filed a petition for bankruptcy relief under Chapter 11 of the federal bankruptcy code, case #4:08-BK-17646-M, U.S. district court for the district of Arkansas, notifying the FCC that "This station must obtain post-petition financing and court approval before digital facilities may be constructed. The station must cease analog broadcasting on (the end of DTV transition in) 2009, regardless of whether digital facilities are operational by that date. The station will file authority to remain silent if so required by the FCC."

While the DTV Delay Act extended this deadline to June 12, 2009, Equity had applied for an extension of the digital construction permit in order to retain the broadcast license after the station went dark. WNYI could not continue analogue operations as it was a full service station on a frequency which is to be reallocated for non-broadcast use at the end of the digital television transition.

On June 12, 2009, a license to cover was granted to Word of God Fellowship for WNYI by the FCC. That firm was required to construct digital television facilities on an in-core frequency before WNYI could be returned to the air, which needed to occur before June 12, 2010, lest the license be automatically forfeited to the FCC. On the weekend of May 22–23, WNYI commenced digital broadcasts on channel 20, within weeks of its license deadline.
