= KJJC-TV =

Television station in Great Falls, Montana

- Great Falls, Montana; United States
- Channels: Digital: 17 (UHF); Virtual: 16
- Branding: KJJC 16

Programming
- Affiliations: 16.1: MeTV; for others, see § Subchannels

Ownership
- Owner: Northwest Capital Corporation; (KTGF License Corporation)

History
- First air date: September 21, 1986
- Former call signs: KTGF (1986–2018); KJJC (2018–2019)
- Former channel numbers: Analog: 16 (UHF, 1986–2009); Digital: 45 (UHF, 2003–2018)
- Former affiliations: NBC (1986–2005); Fox (2005–2007); Independent (2007–2009); JCTV (2009, 2012–2013); Dark (2009–2012)

Technical information
- Licensing authority: FCC
- Facility ID: 13792
- ERP: 500 kW
- HAAT: 78 m (256 ft)
- Transmitter coordinates: 47°27′51.8″N 111°21′21.1″W
- Translator(s): K07AAR-D Helena

Links
- Public license information: Public file; LMS
- Website: www.kjjc.org

KJJC-TV (channel 16) is a television station in Great Falls, Montana, United States, affiliated with MeTV and owned by Northwest Capital Corporation. The station's transmitter is located on 47th Avenue SW in unincorporated Cascade County, near the Great Falls International Airport. Station operations are conducted from a facility on Colonial Drive in Helena, where KJJC-TV is rebroadcast by commonly owned translator K07AAR-D (channel 7).

KJJC-TV began broadcasting in September 1986 as KTGF. It was the third commercial station in Great Falls and an NBC affiliate for 19 years; the station produced local news programming in the late 1980s and early 1990s before canceling the effort in 1993. The founding owners, Continental Television Network, later established third stations in Missoula and Butte, which were sold together with KTGF to Max Media in 2001. Max owned the station until it was required to divest KTGF to buy KFBB-TV, the local ABC affiliate. Destiny Communications, a Black-owned company, purchased KTGF as its first television station in 2004. However, within a year, it lost the NBC affiliation to KBGF-LP (channel 50, today's KTGF-LD), an extension of KTVH-DT in Helena, in a decision that NBC had apparently made years prior.

As a result, on July 1, 2005, KTGF became an affiliate of Fox, but this lasted just two years before KTGF became an independent station. In 2009, Destiny defaulted on its debt payments, and the license was transferred to a creditor. Roger Lonnquist acquired the station in 2012; it has aired MeTV as its main subchannel since 2013 along with a selection of Christian television channels owned by the Trinity Broadcasting Network. All five subchannels are also broadcast by KINV-LD in Billings.

== History ==
=== Continental Television Network ownership ===
In 1984, KRTV (channel 3), which had served as an affiliate of NBC and CBS since 1968, reduced its carriage of NBC programs as the Montana Television Network, of which it was a part, adopted primary CBS affiliation statewide. KRTV and ABC affiliate KFBB-TV (channel 5) continued to air some NBC programs in the city. However, in the wake of the affiliation change, Joe Colla saw an opening for a full-time NBC affiliate in the city. The NBC network expressed interest but instructed him to apply for a station first.

In April 1985, Colla's firm, Video International Publishers, applied to the Federal Communications Commission (FCC) for a construction permit to build a new television station on channel 16 in Great Falls. The FCC granted approval on July 25, 1985, and in February 1986, the Montana Economic Development Board granted the firm—now known as Continental Television Network—a $1.1 million loan to finance construction. The two minority owners in Continental Television Network each had a background in local business: Al Donohue, owner of the Heritage Inn, and William Cordingley, former publisher of the Great Falls Tribune newspaper.

After delays caused by rain, KTGF began broadcasting on September 21, 1986. The studios were in a former machine shop at 118 6th Street South, which was shared with Colla's video production business. KTGF began airing early and late evening local newscasts in late October, with most of the news staff being new to the market. Over the succeeding years, KTGF expanded its reach by investing in additional translators and a microwave joint venture with cable company TCI; while the station benefited from the national lead held by NBC at the time, its newscasts remained in third place, with the early evening newscast being especially distant from catching KRTV and KFBB, then competing vigorously for ratings leadership in Great Falls. The newscasts continued until staffing issues led to their ultimate demise. Weekend newscasts were canceled in August 1992, when the weekend news anchor left to take a job in Fort Smith, Arkansas, and the last weeknight newscast aired on March 5, 1993, by which time there were just four staffers left producing KTGF's news programming.

In the 1990s, Continental also expanded its third station franchise with a pair of ABC affiliates. In Missoula, KTMF began broadcasting in November 1990. Six years later, Continental started KWYB, broadcasting to Butte and Bozeman. Continental's stations served as secondary affiliates of Fox beginning in 1994, though Fox's NFL games aired on KFBB-TV.

=== Max Media ownership ===
Continental Television Network accepted an $18 million offer for its three Montana television stations from Max Media in December 2000. The deal marked Max's return to the television business, having previously sold its portfolio of broadcast properties to Sinclair Broadcast Group in 1998. Max hired Jack May, longtime KFBB-TV general manager, and promised technical improvements including an interconnection of the Great Falls, Missoula, and Butte stations, which were fed from facilities in Missoula. However, these upgrades were marred by technical difficulties. Viewers of the 2002 Winter Olympics, aired by NBC, in Great Falls experienced difficulties in transmission with the new system in Missoula. Signal issues persisted as late as May.

In September 2002, Max contracted with Independent News Network of Davenport, Iowa, to produce a regional newscast for KWYB, KTMF, and KTGF. Six reporters, one each in the five areas serviced by the Max Montana stations and another in Helena, contributed reports to Big Sky News at 5 and 10 p.m., which was presented from Iowa. The early newscast was dropped at the start of 2004.

=== Destiny Communications ownership and affiliation instability ===
Max Media announced on September 30, 2003, that it had agreed to purchase Great Falls ABC affiliate KFBB-TV and KULR-TV in Billings from the Wooster Republican Printing Company, which decided to exit the television business. To acquire KFBB, Max was required to put KTGF on the market and agreed in September 2004 to sell the station to Destiny Communications of Wichita, Kansas. Destiny was owned by Darnell Washington, a 20-year veteran of television stations in other parts of the United States; Max Media and private investors provided funding for the transaction. It was Washington's first television property, which he purchased despite having never visited Montana; KTGF became Montana's only Black-owned TV station, in a city where just 1.4 percent of the population was Black. With the Big Sky News program moving to KFBB, Destiny announced plans to build out a full news department for KTGF for the first time in twelve years.

However, by the time Destiny had purchased KTGF, events were in motion that eventually led to the station losing its NBC affiliation. KTVH in Helena, also an NBC affiliate, began making inroads in the Great Falls media market in 2001 with the launch of KBBJ and KBAO, which were extensions of KTVH in Havre and Lewistown. The Havre station was built despite objections from KTGF, while news of the Lewistown station led to KTGF purchasing a translator to rebroadcast its programs there. As early as January 2002, KTVH was touting the fact that it would have the rights to NBC programming in Great Falls by 2005. NBC would later claim that it had made the decision "many years ago", citing issues with one of the former owners of KTGF.

The affiliation loss came on July 1, 2005, when KBGF-LP debuted as the new NBC affiliate in Great Falls. At that time, after protesting NBC's decision, KTGF assumed the Fox and UPN affiliations in the city under an agreement with Equity Broadcasting Corporation, which owned KLMN (channel 26), which had been the city's Fox affiliate. In March 2007, KTGF debuted hourly news updates on weekdays. However, the Fox affiliation was short-lived. On May 5 of that year, Fox programs abruptly returned to KLMN. The station then began broadcasting as an independent station, relying on syndicated programming. Meanwhile, Destiny Communications partnered with College Creek Media of Chicago to program three FM radio stations in the Great Falls area.

Between 2009 and 2010, however, Destiny Communications came undone. The radio station operating agreement lasted less than a year before College Creek opted to sell the outlets; Destiny was unable to arrange financing to make the purchase itself. In September, the independent programming was dropped in favor of broadcasting JCTV, a Christian television channel owned by the Trinity Broadcasting Network and aimed at a youth audience. That same month, after Destiny defaulted on its debt payments, the station filed to transfer the KTGF license to creditor RGW Investments LLC.

In the meantime, KTGF went off the air on December 19, 2009, citing problems with its microwave system. By February 2010, it was noted that the station was not airing any programming; that March, Max Media, which had retained the studio building and leased it to Destiny, sold the building to a local law firm.

=== RGW Investments and Lonnquist ownership ===
KTGF's license was formally transferred to RGW Investments on September 27, 2010. In December 2011, RGW Investments entered into an agreement to sell KTGF to KTGF License Corporation, a company owned by veteran radio and TV broadcaster Roger Lonnquist. The sale closed on March 7, 2012. Soon afterward, the station returned to the air, again as a JCTV affiliate. In September 2013, MeTV announced that KTGF would begin to carry its programming; as of 2014, MeTV programming is carried on its primary channel, with JUCE TV (the former JCTV) being moved to a second subchannel. The station changed its call letters to KJJC on July 1, 2018; the "-TV" suffix was added on May 9, 2019.

== Technical information ==
=== Subchannels ===
KJJC-TV's transmitter is located on 47th Avenue SW in unincorporated Cascade County, near the Great Falls International Airport. The station's signal is multiplexed:

Subchannels of KJJC-TV
Subchannel	Res.	Short name	Programming
16.1	480i	KJJC-DT	MeTV (4:3)
16.2	480i	KJJC-D2	Positiv (4:3)
16.3	480i	KJJC-D3	TBN (4:3)
16.4	480i	KJJC-D4	OnTV4U (infomercials) (4:3)
16.5	480i	KJJC-D5	TBN Inspire (4:3)
