= WUMN-LD =

Television station in Minneapolis

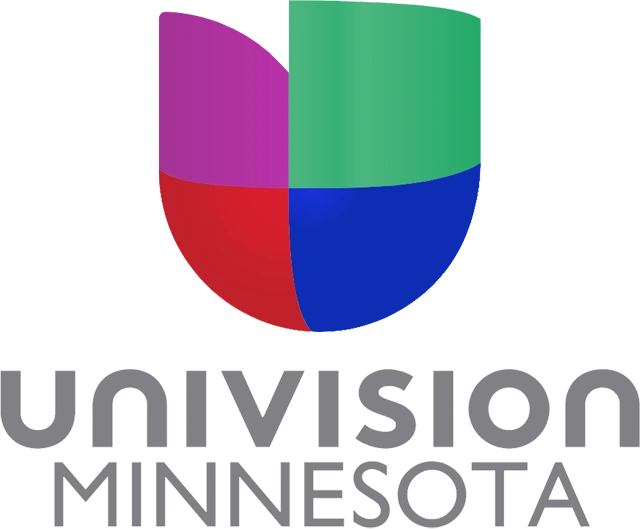
- Minneapolis–Saint Paul, Minnesota; United States
- City: Minneapolis, Minnesota
- Channels: Digital: 21 (UHF); Virtual: 21
- Branding: Univision Minnesota

Programming
- Affiliations: 21.1: Univision

Ownership
- Owner: Bridge Media Networks; (Bridge News LLC)

History
- Founded: September 26, 1985
- First air date: 2005
- Former call signs: K13UT, K33FB, WBWX-CA
- Former channel numbers: Analog: 13 (VHF, 2005–2013); Digital: 17 (UHF, 2013–2020); Virtual: 17 (2013–2020)
- Former affiliations: The Box, MTV2
- Call sign meaning: Univision Minneapolis or Minnesota (postal abbreviation)

Technical information
- Licensing authority: FCC
- Class: LD
- ERP: 15 kW
- HAAT: 175.4 m (575 ft)
- Transmitter coordinates: 44°58′24.9″N 93°16′13.8″W

Links
- Public license information: LMS
- Website: www.univisionminnesota.com

WUMN-LD (channel 21) is a low-power television station licensed to Minneapolis, Minnesota, United States, serving the Twin Cities area as an affiliate of the Spanish-language network Univision. The station is owned by Bridge Media Networks. WUMN-LD's offices and master control facilities are located on South Marquette Avenue, and its transmitter is atop the Campbell Mithun Tower on South 9th Street, both in downtown Minneapolis.

== History ==
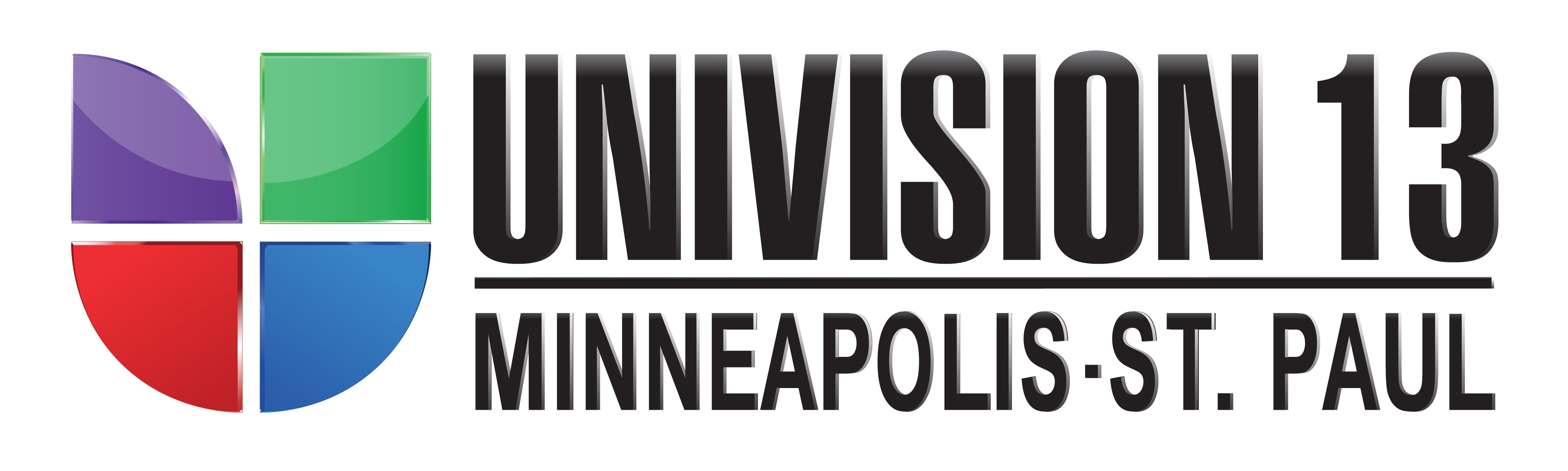
WUMN's logo prior to January 1, 2013

The station began operating in 1985 as K13UT, an affiliate of The Box, a pay per view music video channel. Following the shutdown of The Box, K13UT began carrying MTV2.

In January 2005, after Equity Media Holdings's purchase of channel 13, the station was re-called WUMN-LP, to reflect its new Univision affiliation. Under Equity ownership, all of the station's operations were controlled from Equity's hub in Little Rock, Arkansas, with only engineering staff in the area and no local programming outside of some reporters contributing local stories to a newscast anchored from the Little Rock hub by Independent Network News.

WUMN was sold to SP Television on June 2, 2009, in Equity's bankruptcy auction. The sale closed on August 17, 2009. SP Television reached a deal to sell WUMN to Media Vista Group on December 21, 2012.

On October 29, 2013, WUMN was granted a construction permit by the FCC to transition its broadcast signal to digital on UHF channel 17, formerly occupied by the analog signal of KTCI. At the time, WUMN was the last television station broadcasting an analog signal in the Twin Cities market. Despite Twin Cities Public Television nominally being able to hold on to virtual channel 17, they instead chose to use KTCI as an extension of KTCA, and also number its stations as subchannels of channel 2. This allowed WUMN-LD the use of channel 17 as their new virtual channel number. In early November 2020, WUMN moved from RF channel 17 to their new allotment on RF channel 21, displaying as 21.1.

On September 18, 2023, it was announced that WUMN-LD and sister station KUKC-LD in Kansas City would be sold to Bridge Media Networks, led by investor Manoj Bhargava, for $2.25 million; the sale does not include the stations' Univision affiliations. The sale was completed on March 1, 2024.

== News ==
Equity also produced Spanish-language local newscasts at 5 and 10 pm, originating out of the company's program production center in Davenport, Iowa. On June 6, 2008, Equity discontinued local newscasts at its six Univision affiliates, including WUMN. In 2009, WUMN debuted its new local show Impacto Local. Airing on a weekly basis, the program visually documents and informs the Twin Cities community on education, politics, immigration, news, sports, culture and music events.

== Subchannels ==
The station's signal is multiplexed:

Subchannels of WUMN-LD
Channel	Res.	Short name	Programming
21.1	720p	WUMN	Univision
21.2	720p	NEWSnet	ShopHQ
21.3	480i	Funroad	Infomercials
21.4	720p	ShopHQ	Best of ShopHQ
21.5	480i	AceTV	Ace TV
21.6	480i	OAN	One America Plus
21.7	480i	AWE	AWE Plus
21.8	480i	Sales	Infomercials
21.9	480i	BarkTV	Bark TV
21.10	480i	RNTV	Right Now TV
21.11	480i	FTF	FTF Sports
21.12	480i	MTRSPR1	MtrSpt1
21.13	480i	NBTV	National Black TV

Subchannel broadcast with MPEG-4 video
