= Silver Point Capital =

Connecticut-based hedge fund

- Industry: Hedge fund
- Founded: 2002; 24 years ago
- Founders: • Robert J. O’Shea; • Edward A. Mulé
- Headquarters: Greenwich, Connecticut
- AUM: US$42 billion (December 2025)
- Website: www.silverpointcapital.com

Silver Point Capital is a Greenwich, Connecticut-based hedge fund that focuses on credit and special situations investments.

In 2014, Silver Point ranked No. 1 overall in Institutional Investor's annual Hedge Fund Report Card survey. The fund received the highest scores out of all hedge funds across Alpha Generation, Alignment of Interests, and Transparency. In 2021, the company reported to manage approximately $20 billion in assets.

== History ==
Silver Point Capital was founded in 2002 by former Goldman Sachs partners Edward A. Mulé and Robert J. O’Shea. Mulé headed or co-headed Goldman's Special Situations Investing Business from 1999 to 2001. O'Shea founded and headed Goldman's Global Bank Loan Business, and headed Goldman's Global High Yield Business. Together, they created and led Goldman's distressed debt and special situation lending businesses before leaving to create Silver Point.

By 2008 the firm managed several billion dollars, but it was hit by the global financial crisis, with one flagship fund reportedly posting a drawdown of more than 30% and assets declining from about $9.3 billion to $6.5 billion over the course of 2008.

The firm subsequently recovered by investing in corporate bankruptcies, restructurings and liquidations that followed the crisis, and remained one of the more prominent credit-oriented hedge funds through the early 2010s.

During the 2010s and early 2020s Silver Point broadened its platform beyond hedge funds into private credit strategies, including direct lending and distressed-debt funds. Trade publication 'Private Debt Investor' has reported on a series of capital-raising efforts, including a distressed opportunities vehicle launched in 2019 and subsequent credit funds that reached or exceeded their fundraising targets, as well as a second direct-lending fund that hit its $2 billion hard cap in 2021.
