= Automatic stay =

In US law, an injunction against debt collection when bankruptcy is declared

In United States bankruptcy law, an automatic stay is an automatic injunction that halts actions by creditors, with certain exceptions, to collect debts from a debtor who has declared bankruptcy. Under section 362 of the United States Bankruptcy Code, the stay begins at the moment the bankruptcy petition is filed. Secured creditors may, however, petition the bankruptcy court for relief from the automatic stay upon a showing of cause.

== Provisions ==
A filed bankruptcy petition immediately operates as an automatic stay, holding in abeyance various forms of creditor action against the debtor. Automatic stay provisions work to protect the debtor against certain actions from the creditor, including:

- beginning or continuing judicial proceedings against the debtor
- actions to obtain debtor's property
- actions to create, perfect or enforce a lien against a debtor's property
- set-off of indebtedness owed to the debtor before commencement of the bankruptcy proceeding.

A court may give a creditor relief from the stay if the creditor can show that the stay does not give the creditor "adequate protection" or if it jeopardizes the creditor's interest in certain property. The court may give relief to the creditor in the form of periodic cash payments or an additional or replacement lien on the property.

Concerned that debtors may exploit some of the advantages of automatic stay provisions, the United States Congress in 1994 provided some relief to certain creditors, such as creditors having a secured interest in a single real estate asset. Congress required that debtors in this situation either file a plan that has a reasonable chance of being accepted within a reasonable amount of time, or make monthly payments to each such secured creditor in the amount equal to interest at a current fair market rate on the value of the creditor's real estate.

In 2005, Congress added two more exceptions to the automatic stay provisions. These exceptions concern landlords seeking to evict tenants. First, any eviction proceedings in which the landlord obtained a judgment of possession prior to the filing of the bankruptcy petition may be continued. Second, eviction proceedings filed after bankruptcy proceedings are exempt if the proceeding involves evicting the tenant on the basis of using illegal substances or "endangerment" of the property.

Pursuant to the new provisions of the Bankruptcy Abuse Prevention and Consumer Protection Act, certain restrictions were added to section 362. If the debtor had a case dismissed in a case pending during the year before the bankruptcy case was filed, the automatic stay will expire as to the debtor and possibly as to the estate unless the debtor obtains an order extending it within 30 days. If the debtor had two cases pending in the year prior to filing, the automatic stay does not go into effect unless the debtor files a motion.
