= Digital broadcasting =

Radio frequency broadcasting technique

Digital broadcasting is the practice of using digital signals rather than analogue signals for broadcasting over radio frequency bands (radio broadcasting). Digital television broadcasting (especially satellite television) is widespread. Digital audio broadcasting is being adopted more slowly for radio broadcasting where it is mainly used in Satellite radio.

Digital links, thanks to the use of data compression, generally have greater spectral efficiency than analog links. Content providers can provide more services or a higher-quality signal than was previously available.

It is estimated that the share of digital broadcasting increased from 7% of the total amount of broadcast information in 2000, to 25% in 2007. Some countries have completed a Digital television transition.

== See also ==
- Digital radio
- Digital television
- ATSC Standards
- ATSC tuner
- Digital Audio Broadcasting
- Digital Radio Mondiale
- Digital Video Broadcasting
- HD Radio
- Satellite radio
- Satellite television
