= Federal Rules of Bankruptcy Procedure =

United States legal procedure directions

The Federal Rules of Bankruptcy Procedure (abbreviated Fed. R. Bankr. P. or FRBP) are a set of rules promulgated by the Supreme Court of the United States under the Rules Enabling Act, directing procedures in the United States bankruptcy courts. They are the bankruptcy law counterpart to the Federal Rules of Civil Procedure.

Title I of the Bankruptcy Amendments and Federal Judgeship Act of 1984, Pub. L. No. 98–353, created a new bankruptcy judicial system in which the role of the district court was substantially increased. 28 U.S.C. § 1334 confers on the United States district courts original and exclusive jurisdiction over all cases under title 11 of the United States Code and original but not exclusive jurisdiction over civil proceedings arising under title 11 and civil proceedings arising in or related to a case under title 11.

Pursuant to 28 U.S.C. § §157(a) the district court may but need not refer cases and proceedings within the district court's jurisdiction to the bankruptcy judges for the district. Judgments or orders of the bankruptcy judges entered pursuant to 28 U.S.C. §157(b)(1) and (c)(2) are subject to appellate review by the district courts or bankruptcy appellate panels under 28 U.S.C. § 158(a).

Rule 81(a)(1) F.R.Civ.P. provides that the civil rules do not apply to proceedings in bankruptcy, except as they may be made applicable by rules promulgated by the Supreme Court, e.g., Part VII of these rules. This amended Bankruptcy Rule 1001 makes the Bankruptcy Rules applicable to cases and proceedings under title 11, whether before the district judges or the bankruptcy judges of the district.

Among the topics covered by the FRBP are adversary proceedings in bankruptcy, commencement of cases (by filing a voluntary or involuntary bankruptcy petition), how a creditor may file a proof of claim in bankruptcy or a petition for relief from automatic stay, the duties of the debtor, time periods for filing various types of motions, and the procedures for appealing a judgment to the United States District Court or the Bankruptcy Appellate Panel for the debtor's judicial circuit.

== Contents of the Rules ==
The rules are broken down into ten parts, as follows:

- Rule 1001 – Scope of Rules and Forms; Short Title
- Part I – Commencement of Case; Proceedings Relating to Petition and Order for Relief
- Part II – Officers and Administration; Notices; Meetings; Examinations; Elections; Attorneys and Accountants
- Part III – Claims and Distribution to Creditors and Equity Interest Holders; Plans
- Part IV – The Debtor: Duties and Benefits
- Part V – Courts and Clerks
- Part VI – Collection and Liquidation of the Estate
- Part VII – Adversary Proceedings
- Part VIII – Appeals to District Court or Bankruptcy Appellate Panel
- Part IX – General Provisions
