= Retro TV =

American broadcast television network

- Type: Broadcast television network
- Country: United States
- Headquarters: Chattanooga, Tennessee, U.S.

Programming
- Picture format: 480i (SDTV)

Ownership
- Owner: Get After It Media
- Key people: Joel Wertman; David Leach

History
- Launched: July 2005; 21 years ago
- Former names: Retro Television Network (2005–2009); RTV (2009–2013)

Links
- Website: www.getafteritmedia.com/retrotv

Retro TV (stylized as retro^{tv}), formerly known as Retro Television Network, is an American broadcast television network owned by Get After It Media. The network mainly airs classic television sitcoms and drama series from the 1950s through the 1980s, although it also includes more recent programs from the 1990s and 2000s. Through its ownership by Luken, Retro TV is a sister network to several broadcast network properties that are wholly or jointly owned by the company, including the family-oriented Family Channel and country music-oriented network Heartland.

At its outset, Retro TV was designed to be broadcast on the digital subchannels of television stations; however in recent years, the network's affiliate body has been drawn down to primarily low-power stations, as many station groups have replaced the network on the subchannels of their full-power major network affiliates with similarly formatted networks such as Antenna TV and MeTV, which have assumed rights to many of the distributors that formerly held programming agreements with Retro. The network is also available nationwide on free-to-air C-band satellite via SES-2 in DVB-S2 format; as individualized transmitter-ready feeds for each station are centrally generated using broadcast automation and delivered to the stations by satellite. In March 2020, Retro TV launched a live online feed, which carries a limited six-hour selection of the network's programming, looped four times each day.

== History ==
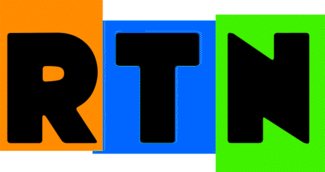
Retro Television Network logo used from July 2005 to June 2009.

The Retro Television Network (originally branded as "RTN") launched in July 2005 on select television stations owned by the Equity Broadcasting Corporation (later known as Equity Media Holdings), a chain of small (often low-powered) satellite-fed VHF and UHF television stations controlled directly from Equity's headquarters in Little Rock, Arkansas. Equity had expanded quickly with purchases of many small stations in the early 2000s, but by 2008, the company was struggling to meet its obligations.

In June 2008, while the company was undergoing financial troubles, Equity Media Holdings sold RTN to Henry Luken III's – Equity's former president and CEO, and the company's largest shareholder – Luken Communications (which later rebranded as Reach High Media Group in 2019) for $18.5 million in cash. Equity had an option to repurchase the network for $27.75 million; the purchase option was not exercised and expired on December 24, 2008. Equity had filed for Chapter 11 bankruptcy three weeks before the expiration of the purchase option.

On January 4, 2009, a contract conflict between Equity and Luken Communications interrupted RTN programming on many of its affiliates with Luken alleging that Equity had left many obligations to RTN's creditors, including programming suppliers, unpaid. As a result, Luken restored a national feed of the network from its Chattanooga headquarters with individual feeds to affiliates not owned by Equity following suit on a piecemeal basis. Equity-owned or -operated stations lost RTN affiliation, though Luken vowed to find new affiliates for the network in the affected areas.

RTV logo used from June 2009 to March 2013.

The Retro Television Network changed its on-air branding to "RTV" in June 2009 (a nod to the digital television transition that occurred that month, though a trademark dispute with the Racetrack Television Network was also a factor in the change).

Retro TV logo used from June 2013 to July 2026.

The network was re-branded as Retro TV in 2013. Of the top 25 digital broadcast networks for 2014, Retro TV ranked No. 10 with a coverage of 54% of households.

== Concept and programming ==
Since its creation, Retro's principal programming concept consists of classic television series, initially maintaining a 24-hour schedule of shows. As of 2019, the on-air lineup dates mostly from the 1950s to the 1970s, with the exception of prime time, which consists mostly of contemporary programming from Canada. Retro airs a full block of Saturday morning cartoon reruns and family-friendly adventure series and comedies on Saturdays; the network uses Sunday mornings to meet E/I liabilities, largely with programming widely available elsewhere.

There have been some deviations to the format, including during the network's ownership under Equity, which added some original talk programming (notably Unreliable Sources) during the late night slot on weeknights from the summer of 2008 to early 2009, a concept billed as "Classic Hits All Day & Fresh Talk All Night". Overnights also eventually became devoted to Shop LC and paid programming. The network has also featured originally produced horror film showcases such as Wolfman Mac's Chiller Drive-In and Off Beat Cinema; Retro also aired the talk show Daytime produced by WFLA-TV's Riverbank Studios in Tampa, Florida, co-hosted by Jerry Penacoli and Cyndi Edwards.

Until 2011, Retro offered a customized schedule for use at the discretion of the local affiliate. The network then moved towards a set national schedule, although affiliates have the option to pre-empt or reschedule some network programming.

By June 2011, when Retro's distribution agreement with NBCUniversal Television Distribution ended, the network adjusted its schedule to feature programming from other distributors (such as I Spy and Starsky and Hutch) and public domain programs (such as early episodes of The Beverly Hillbillies), as well as low-cost Canadian barter programs (such as Cold Squad and Da Vinci's Inquest) and reality and documentary programming (including Crusade in Europe based on Gen. Dwight Eisenhower's memoirs of World War II and Crusade in the Pacific). Retro also featured a Saturday morning block of vintage cartoon programming. In 2014, Retro began broadcasting Mystery Science Theater 3000, the soap opera The Doctors, and the classic era of long-running British science fiction television show Doctor Who; MST3K departed the schedule upon the rights being purchased by Sinclair Broadcast Group's Comet.

The network previously had major content deals with CBS Television Distribution until July 2008, and NBCUniversal Television Distribution (whose programming agreement began after the deal with CBS ended) until June 2011. Retro's current programming roster draws from various distributors including BBC Studios Distribution, Genesis International, Shout! Factory, Peter Rodgers Organization, CBC Television, and SFM Entertainment, as well as John DiSciullo (the distributor of Off Beat Cinema); compared to its competition, public domain series continue to compose a large portion of the schedule.

== Affiliates ==
As of July 2026, Retro TV is carried on 108 affiliates (mostly on low-power stations) across the United States, covering over 39% of the country's DMA households.

Prior to the 2009 digital transition, Retro TV was seen on a number of analog stations owned by Equity Media Holdings, the network's former owner. Some Equity stations mixed Retro programming with first-run and recent off-network syndicated programming or also carried another network, such as MyNetworkTV or The CW Plus.

In 2012, RTV dropped from 120 to 80 affiliates with many ABC affiliates switching to the Live Well Network. Further affiliate drops occurred as RTV's scheduling began to decline with lesser product, with MeTV and Antenna TV (both with strong corporate backing and financing, along with more generous affiliation terms than Luken) making major carriage deals with large broadcast groups. In March 2017, the final "major" group carrying the network, Sinclair Broadcast Group, dropped the network from three remaining Sinclair stations where RTV affiliation agreements were made with their former owners, replacing it with their in-house network TBD. On October 1, 2017, the network lost its last station with one of the major broadcast networks, WKTC in Columbia, South Carolina, which replaced its subchannel with Laff.
