= Flash cut =

Immediate change in a complex system with no phase-in period

A flash cut, also called a flash cutover, is an immediate change in a complex system, with no phase-in period.

In the United States, some telephone area codes were split without a period to allow customers to readjust, learn, or change equipment, such as a permissive dialing period.

Another example is an immediate switch from an analog television channel to a digital television channel on the same frequency, where the two cannot operate in parallel without interference.

A flash cut can also define a procedure in which multiple components of computer infrastructure are upgraded in multiple ways, all at once, with no phase-in period.

== See also ==
- Big bang adoption
- Flag day (software)
- Dagen H, when Sweden switched from driving on the left-hand side of the road to the right
- Smash cut, an abrupt change of scene in a motion picture
