= List of television stations in Arkansas =

This is a list of broadcast television stations that are licensed in the U.S. state of Arkansas.

== Full-power ==
- Stations are arranged by media market served and channel position.

Full-power television stations in Arkansas
Media market	Station	Channel	Primary affiliation(s)	Notes	Refs
Fayetteville	KAFT	13	PBS	(Note: Satellite of KETS.)	
Fayetteville	KHOG-TV	29	ABC, The CW on 29.2	(Note: Satellite of KHBS.)	
Fayetteville	KXNW	34	MyNetworkTV	(Note: Licensed to Eureka Springs, Arkansas.)	
Fayetteville	KNWA-TV	51	NBC, Fox on 51.2	(Note: Licensed to Rogers, Arkansas.)	
Fayetteville	KWOG	57	Daystar	(Note: Licensed to Springdale, Arkansas.)	
Fort Smith	KFSM-TV	5	CBS		
Fort Smith	KFTA-TV	24	Fox, NBC on 24.2, MyNetworkTV on 34.1		
Fort Smith	KHBS	40	ABC, The CW on 40.2		
Jonesboro	KAIT	8	ABC, NBC on 8.2, The CW on 8.3		
Jonesboro	KTEJ	19	PBS		
Jonesboro	KVTJ-DT	48	Victory Television	(Note: Satellite of KVTN-DT.)	
Little Rock	KETS	2	PBS		
Little Rock	KARK-TV	4	NBC		
Little Rock	KEMV	6	PBS	(Note: Licensed to Mountain View, Arkansas.)	
Little Rock	KATV	7	ABC		
Little Rock	KETG	9	PBS	(Note: Licensed to Arkadelphia, Arkansas.)	
Little Rock	KTHV	11	CBS		
Little Rock	KLRT-TV	16	Fox		
Little Rock	KVTN-DT	25	Victory Television	(Note: Licensed to Pine Bluff, Arkansas.)	
Little Rock	KVTH-DT	26	Victory Television	(Note: Licensed to Hot Springs, Arkansas.)	
Little Rock	KKAP	36	Daystar		
Little Rock	KASN	38	The CW		
Little Rock	KARZ-TV	42	MyNetworkTV		
Little Rock	KMYA-DT	49	MeTV	(Note: Licensed to Camden, Arkansas.)	
~Monroe, LA	KTVE	10	NBC, Fox on 10.2	(Note: Licensed to El Dorado, Arkansas.)	
~Monroe, LA	KETZ	12	PBS		
~Springfield, MO	KWBM	31	Independent	(Note: Licensed to Harrison, Arkansas.)	

== Low-power ==
Low-power television stations in Arkansas
Media market	Station	Channel	Primary affiliation(s)	Notes	Refs
Fayetteville	KWNL-CD	14	Univision	(Note: Licensed to Bentonville, Arkansas.)	
Fayetteville	KAJL-LD	16	Various		
Fayetteville	KFLU-LD	20	Various		
Fayetteville	K12XB-D	22	[Blank]		
Fayetteville	KKAF-LD	30	Various		
Fayetteville	KPBI-CD	31	Estrella TV	(Note: Licensed to Winslow, Arkansas.)	
Fayetteville	KFFS-CD	36	Various		
Fayetteville	K28NT-D	48	Various		
Fort Smith	KSJF-LD	34	Telemundo, TeleXitos on 34.3		
Fort Smith	KFDF-CD	44	Estrella TV		
Jonesboro	KIAT-LD	8	Telemundo		
Jonesboro	KJBW-LD	35	Various	(Note: Licensed to Paragould, Arkansas.)	
Jonesboro	KJNB-LD	39	Fox, CBS on 39.2, MeTV/MyNetworkTV on 39.3		
Little Rock	KKME-LD	3	Catchy Comedy		
Little Rock	KTVV-LD	18	Various		
Little Rock	KLRA-CD	20	Univision		
Little Rock	K15MO-D	27	Silent		
Little Rock	K19MC-D	30	3ABN	(Note: Licensed to Bonnerdale, Arkansas.)	
Little Rock	KKYK-CD	30	Telemundo		
Little Rock	KWMO-LD	34	Various		
Little Rock	K23OW-D	39	Various		
Little Rock	KENH-LD	41	Various		
~Monroe, LA	KCIB-LD	5	Religious independent		
~Shreveport, LA	KTEV-LD	19	CBS	(Note: Licensed to Texarkana, Arkansas.)	
~Shreveport, LA	KLFI-CD	35	TCT		
~Shreveport, LA	K36MU-D	36	Outlaw		
~Springfield, MO	K21JS-D	16	[Blank]		
~Springfield, MO	K26GS-D	26	Heroes & Icons		
~Memphis, TN	KPMF-LD	26	MyNetworkTV/Quest		

== Translators ==
Television station translators in Arkansas
Media market	Station	Channel	Translating	Notes	Refs
Fort Smith	KHEF-LD	20	KFFS-CD		
Fort Smith	KXKY-LD	22	KFFS-CD		
Fort Smith	KWFT-LD	30	KKAF-LD	(Note: Licensed to Siloam Springs, Arkansas.)	
Fort Smith	KHMF-LD	33	KKAF-LD		
Fort Smith	KRAH-CD	35	KSJF-CD	(Note: Licensed to Paris, Arkansas.)	
Fort Smith	KQRY-LD	36	KFFS-CD	(Note: Licensed to Lowell, Arkansas.)	
Fort Smith	KXUN-LD	48	KWNL-CD		
Fort Smith	KUFS-LD	54	KFFS-CD		
Jonesboro	KJTB-LD	8	KAIT		
Jonesboro	KJNE-LD	42	KJNB-LD		
Little Rock	KMYA-LD	49	KMYA-DT	(Note: Licensed to Sheridan, Arkansas.)	
~Monroe, LA	K20OC-D	8	KNOE-TV		

== Defunct ==
- K45AY Jonesboro (1985–1986)
- KFOY-TV Hot Springs (1961–1963)
- KGTO-TV Fayetteville (1969–1973)
- KFSA-TV Fort Smith (1953–1958)
- KLEP Newark (1985–2005)
- KRTV Little Rock (1953–1954)
- KRZB-TV Hot Springs (1986–1988)
- KEJB El Dorado (2003–2010)

== See also ==
- Arkansas § Media
  - List of newspapers in Arkansas
  - List of radio stations in Arkansas
  - Media of cities in Arkansas: Fayetteville, Fort Smith, Hot Springs, Little Rock, Rogers

== Bibliography ==
- "United States TV Stations: Arkansas", Yearbook of Radio and Television, New York: Radio Television Daily, 1964, OCLC 7469377 – via Internet Archive
