= KKYK =

KKYK may refer to:

- KKYK-CD, a low-power television station (channel 21, virtual 30) licensed to serve Little Rock, Arkansas, United States
- KLRA-CD, a low-power television station (channel 20) licensed to serve Little Rock, Arkansas, which held the call sign KKYK-CD from 2011 to 2013
- KMYA-DT, a television station (channel 18, virtual 49) licensed to serve Camden, Arkansas, which held the call sign KKYK-TV from 1999 to 2001 and KKYK-DT from 2006 to 2011
