= KQRY =

KQRY may refer to:

- KQRY-LD, a low-power television station (channel 5, virtual 36) licensed to serve Fort Smith, Arkansas, United States
- KXUN-LD, a low-power television station (channel 26, virtual 48) licensed to serve Sallisaw, Oklahoma, United States, which held the call sign KQRY-LD from 2018 to 2019
- KQRY, a fictional television station in the 2018 animated film Incredibles 2
