= KKYK-CD =

Television station in Little Rock, Arkansas

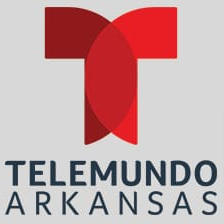
- Little Rock, Arkansas; United States
- Channels: Digital: 21 (UHF), applied for 35 (UHF); Virtual: 30
- Branding: Telemundo Arkansas

Programming
- Affiliations: 30.1: Telemundo; for others, see § Subchannels

Ownership
- Owner: Kaleidoscope Foundation, Inc.; (KTV Media, LLC)
- Sister stations: KLRA-CD

History
- Founded: May 15, 1995
- First air date: January 24, 1997
- Former call signs: K58FA (1995–1997); KKRK-LP (1997–1999); KLRA-LP (1999–2012); KLRA-CD (2012–2013)
- Former channel numbers: Analog: 58 (UHF, 1997–2012); Digital: 16 (UHF, 2012–2018)
- Former affiliations: The WB (1997–2001); Univision (2001–2013); Soul of the South Television (2013–2017); Vibrant TV (2017–2020)
- Call sign meaning: Derived from radio station (now KABZ) and former sister television station (now KMYA-DT)

Technical information
- Licensing authority: FCC
- Facility ID: 57548
- Class: CD
- ERP: 15 kW
- HAAT: 350.2 m (1,149 ft)
- Transmitter coordinates: 34°47′56″N 92°29′45″W

Links
- Public license information: Public file; LMS
- Website: telemundoarkansas.com

KKYK-CD (channel 30) is a low-power, Class A television station in Little Rock, Arkansas, United States, affiliated with the Spanish-language network Telemundo. Owned by KTV Media, KKYK-CD maintains studios on Shackelford Drive in the Beverly Hills section of Little Rock (alongside KLRA-CD), and its transmitter is located on Shinall Mountain, near the city's Chenal Valley neighborhood.

== History ==
The station first signed on the air on May 15, 1995 as K58FA; its calls were changed to KKRK-LP in 1997. In 1999, the station was acquired by the Equity Broadcasting Corporation, which was based in Little Rock, and changed its call letters to KLRA-LP (the KLRA callsign originally belonged to a popular country music AM radio station in Little Rock; it was known for its morning DJ Hal Webber, whose on-air senior-citizen character was called "Brother Hal"; Equity commonly used the call signs of old Little Rock radio stations for its television stations; such as KKYK and KBBL).

The station became an affiliate of Spanish-language network Univision in 2001. On May 8, 2004, Equity began simulcasting the station's programming on sister station KUOK in Woodward, Oklahoma as well as its three translators (K69EK (now KOCY-LD) and KCHM-LP (now KUOK-CD) in Oklahoma City; KUOK-CA (now defunct) in Norman; and KOKT-LP (also now defunct) in Sulphur), forming a regional mini-network known as Univision Arkansas-Oklahoma. Local commercials from the Little Rock area that were inserted by that station during national commercial breaks and KLRA-LP's station identification bumpers were broadcast through this simulcast to Oklahoma viewers (the Oklahoma City repeaters were identified only through text-only IDs placed at the bottom of the screen each half-hour). In March 2005, the simulcast between KLRA-LP and KUOK was discontinued, with both stations – which continued to be programmed via satellite from Equity's headquarters in Little Rock – relaying Univision programming through separate feeds with KUOK carrying advertising for businesses within the Oklahoma City market and separate station promotions (KUOK's schedule now mirrors the national feed outside of local advertising, news inserts and occasional paid programming substitutions). KLRA-LP rebranded as Univision Arkansas shortly afterward.

After failing to find a buyer at a bankruptcy auction, KLRA was sold to Pinnacle Media in August 2009 (after having initially been included in Silver Point Finance's acquisition on June 2 of several Equity stations), with Pinnacle assuming control of the station under a local marketing agreement on August 5. In 2013, the station changed its call letters to KKYK-CD (a callsign that was formerly used on a repeater of former sister station KMYA-DT, channel 49, which also once bore the KKYK calls); in addition to swapping call letters, the station also swapped affiliations with KKYK-CD (channel 20), which adopted the KLRA-CD calls and became the market's Univision affiliate; the new KKYK-CD moved to UHF channel 30 and became an affiliate of Soul of the South Television. The station's low-power translator stations in northwestern Arkansas: KWNL-CD (channel 31) in Winslow and KXUN-LD (channel 43) in Fort Smith, became translators of KLRA-CD.

In 2017, the station became an affiliate of Vibrant TV. In 2020, the station dropped Vibrant TV and replaced it with the Spanish network Telemundo.

== Newscasts ==
Until 2008, KLRA-LP had produced a daily half-hour Spanish-language regional newscast Noticias Univision Arkansas (Univision Arkansas News), which aired Monday through Friday evenings at 5 and 10 p.m.; the program was produced out of Equity Broadcasting's headquarters in Little Rock as one of what would become six Univision-affiliated stations owned by Equity whose newscasts were hubbed from the facility, although each station maintained their own locally based reporters.

The newscasts were also simulcast on now-former sister station KUOK in Woodward, Oklahoma and its translators (all of which are now owned by Oklahoma City-based Tyler Media Group) after the stations became the Univision affiliate for the Oklahoma City television market in May 2004; as a result, the newscasts were retitled Noticias Univision Arkansas-Oklahoma (Univision Arkansas-Oklahoma News) in 2005. The following year, Equity Broadcasting began producing separate regional Spanish-language newscasts for KUOK and Tulsa Univision affiliate KUTU-CA. As a result of corporate cutbacks due to the company's financial issues, Equity discontinued the newscasts it produced for all six of its Univision affiliates (including KLRA-LP) on June 6, 2008.

== Technical information ==
=== Subchannels ===
The station's signal is multiplexed:

Subchannels of KKYK-CD
Subchannel	Res.	Short name	Programming
30.1	1080i	KKYK-CD	Telemundo
30.2	480i	TeleX	TeleXitos
30.3	480i	Movies	MovieSphere Gold
30.4	480i	BUZZ	Buzzr
30.5	480i	Binge	Binge TV
30.6	480i	OAN	One America Plus
30.7	480i	N2	Newsmax2
30.8	480i	JTV_SP	Jewelry TV
