= List of Dabl affiliates =

The following is a list of affiliates for Dabl, a digital subchannel network owned by CBS Media Ventures and operated by Weigel Broadcasting.

== Affiliates ==
List of current Dabl affiliates
Media market	State/Dist./Terr.	Station	Channel
Huntsville	Alabama	WAAY-TV	31.3
Mobile	Alabama	WFBD	48.7
Montgomery	Alabama	WSFA	12.5
Anchorage	Alaska	KTBY	4.2
Green Valley	Arizona	KUVE-DT	46.6
Phoenix	Arizona	KPHO-TV	5.3
Tucson	Arizona	KUVE-CD	42.6
Camden	Arkansas	KMYA-DT	49.6
Fort Smith–Fayetteville	Arkansas	KFDF-CD	44.2
Fort Smith–Fayetteville	Arkansas	KFSM-TV	5.8
Sheridan–Little Rock	Arkansas	KMYA-LD	49.6
Bakersfield	California	KBAK-TV	29.4
Chico–Redding	California	KCVU	20.5
Fresno	California	KMPH-TV	26.2
Los Angeles	California	KCBS-TV	2.3
Monterey–Salinas	California	KMUV-LD	21.1
Palm Springs	California	KDFX-CD	39.3
Sacramento–Stockton–Modesto	California	KOVR	13.3
San Diego	California	KSKT-CD	43.3
San Francisco–Oakland–San Jose	California	KPIX-TV	5.3
Santa Maria–San Luis Obispo–Santa Barbara	California	KCOY-TV	12.6
Santa Maria–San Luis Obispo–Santa Barbara	California	KKFX-CD	24.6
Colorado Springs–Pueblo	Colorado	KRDO-TV	13.4
Denver	Colorado	KCNC-TV	4.3
Hartford–New Haven	Connecticut	WHCT-LD	35.9
Washington	District of Columbia	WDME-CD	48.6
Jacksonville	Florida	WJXT	4.2
Miami–Fort Lauderdale	Florida	WFOR-TV	4.3
Naples–Fort Myers–Cape Coral–Port Charlotte	Florida	WZVN-TV	26.3
Ocala–Gainesville	Florida	WKMG-LD	6.6
Orlando	Florida	WKMG-TV	6.6
Panama City	Florida	WJHG-TV	7.5
Tampa–St. Petersburg	Florida	WTOG	44.4
Tallahassee	Florida	WTLF	24.5
West Palm Beach	Florida	WTCN-CD	43.4
Atlanta	Georgia	WSB-TV	2.3
Augusta	Georgia	WAGT-CD	26.4
Columbus	Georgia	WXTX	54.3
Savannah	Georgia	WGCB-LD	35.5
Savannah	Georgia	WSCG-LD	14.5
Valdosta–Albany–Moultrie–Tifton	Georgia	WSWG	44.5
Honolulu	Hawaii	KWHE	14.2
Boise	Idaho	KYUU-LD	35.5
Chicago	Illinois	WBBM-TV	2.3
Decatur–Springfield–Champaign–Urbana	Illinois	WBUI	23.2
Evansville	Indiana	WFIE	14.5
Evansville	Indiana	WZDS-LD	5.6
Fort Wayne	Indiana	WISE-TV	33.7
Indianapolis	Indiana	WJSJ-CD	51.3
South Bend	Indiana	WMYS-LD	69.4
Cedar Rapids	Iowa	KFXA	28.5
Des Moines	Iowa	KCWI-TV	5.10
Des Moines	Iowa	KDIT-CD	45.6
Wichita	Kansas	KMTW	36.1
Lexington	Kentucky	WKYT-TV	27.5
Louisville	Kentucky	WHAS-TV	11.9
Baton Rouge	Louisiana	WAFB	9.5
Lafayette	Louisiana	KADN-TV	15.4
Lake Charles	Louisiana	KPLC	7.5
Lake Charles	Louisiana	KGCH-LD	32.5
New Orleans	Louisiana	WWL-TV	4.6
Shreveport	Louisiana	KSLA-TV	12.5
Waterville–Portland	Maine	WPFO	23.4
Baltimore	Maryland	WJZ-TV	13.3
Boston	Massachusetts	WBZ-TV	4.3
Detroit	Michigan	WWJ-TV	62.3
Kalamazoo–Battle Creek–Grand Rapids	Michigan	WLLA	64.6
Kalamazoo–Battle Creek–Grand Rapids	Michigan	WTLJ	54.7
Kalamazoo–Battle Creek–Grand Rapids	Michigan	WJGP-LD	26.7
Marquette	Michigan	WZMQ	19.8
Minneapolis–Saint Paul	Minnesota	WCCO-TV	4.3
Walker	Minnesota	KCCW-TV	12.3
Jackson	Mississippi	WLBT	3.6
Tupelo–Columbus–West Point	Mississippi	WTVA	9.4
Cape Girardeau	Missouri	WDKA	49.5
Columbia–Jefferson City	Missouri	KQFX-LD	22.5
Joplin	Missouri	KFJX	14.4
Kansas City	Missouri	KSMO-TV	62.3
Springfield	Missouri	KRFT-LD	8.8
St. Joseph	Missouri	KCJO-LD	30.3
St. Louis	Missouri	KNLC	24.9
Omaha	Nebraska	KPTM	42.2
Las Vegas	Nevada	KHSV	21.7
Tonopah	Nevada	KBWT	9.4
Albuquerque–Santa Fe	New Mexico	KLUZ-TV	14.5
Carlsbad	New Mexico	KKAC	19.6
Silver City	New Mexico	KKAD	10.6
Albany	New York	WFNY-CA	16.3
Buffalo	New York	WBBZ-TV	67.5
New York City	New York	WCBS-TV	2.3
Rochester	New York	WBGT-CD	46.4
Syracuse	New York	WSYT	43.2
Charlotte	North Carolina	WCCB	18.6
Greensboro–Winston-Salem	North Carolina	WCWG	20.4
New Bern–Greenville–Washington–Jacksonville	North Carolina	WCTI-TV	12.3
Raleigh–Durham–Fayetteville	North Carolina	WRAZ	50.3
Wilmington	North Carolina	WSFX-TV	26.5
Cincinnati	Ohio	WSTR-TV	64.5
Cleveland	Ohio	WOCV-CD	35.5
Columbus	Ohio	WBNS-TV	10.3
Toledo	Ohio	WTVG	13.6
Youngstown	Ohio	WFMJ-TV	21.3
Oklahoma City	Oklahoma	KOCB	34.4
Tulsa	Oklahoma	KOKI-TV	23.3
Astoria	Oregon	KPWT-LD	3.8
Eugene	Oregon	KEVU-CD	23.2
Portland	Oregon	KPTV	12.4
Altoona–Johnstown–State College	Pennsylvania	WKBS-TV	47.5
Philadelphia	Pennsylvania	KYW-TV	3.3
Pittsburgh	Pennsylvania	KDKA-TV	2.3
Mayaguez	Puerto Rico	W22FA-D	34.2
Charleston	South Carolina	WHDC-LD	12.6
Columbia	South Carolina	WOLO-TV	25.6
Florence–Myrtle Beach	South Carolina	WWMB	21.4
Chattanooga	Tennessee	WRCB	3.2
Greeneville–Bristol–Johnson City–Kingsport	Tennessee	WEMT	39.2
Knoxville	Tennessee	WBXX-TV	20.4
Memphis	Tennessee	WNBA-LD	2.1
Nashville	Tennessee	WJFB	44.9
Austin	Texas	KAKW-DT	62.5
Austin	Texas	KTFO-CD	31.5
Beaumont–Orange	Texas	KBTV-TV	4.5
Belton–Killeen–Temple–Waco	Texas	KNCT	46.4
Dallas–Fort Worth	Texas	KTVT	11.3
Dallas–Fort Worth	Texas	KTXA	21.4
El Paso	Texas	KDBC-TV	4.4
Katy–Houston	Texas	KYAZ	51.3
Lubbock	Texas	KJTV-CD	32.3
McAllen–Harlingen	Texas	KCWT-CD	30.3
Odessa–Midland	Texas	KMLM-DT	42.2
Tyler–Longview	Texas	KLTV	7.5
Tyler–Longview	Texas	K21PE-D	21.5
Tyler–Longview	Texas	K31PR-D	31.5
Victoria	Texas	KUNU-LD	21.2
Salt Lake City	Utah	KJZZ-TV	14.5
Portsmouth–Norfolk	Virginia	WGNT	27.4
Richmond–Petersburg	Virginia	WRLH-TV	35.5
Roanoke–Lynchburg	Virginia	WZBJ	24.4
Kennewick–Pasco–Richland	Washington	KVEW-TV	42.5
Seattle–Tacoma	Washington	KSTW	11.4
Spokane	Washington	KXLY-TV	4.5
Yakima	Washington	KAPP	35.5
Huntington–Charleston	West Virginia	WSAZ-TV	3.4
Oak Hill–Beckley–Bluefield	West Virginia	WOAY-TV	4.2
Eau Claire–La Crosse	Wisconsin	WKBT-DT	8.4
Green Bay	Wisconsin	WMEI	31.8
Madison	Wisconsin	WISC-TV	3.3
Milwaukee	Wisconsin	WIWN	68.7
