= KAQY =

KAQY may refer to:

- KAQY-LP, a defunct low-power television station (channel 35) formerly licensed to serve Lexington, Nebraska, United States
- KMLU (TV), a television station (channel 11) serving as the MeTV affiliate for Monroe, Louisiana, that once served as KAQY, the ABC affiliate for that area
- KNOE-DT2, known as KAQY ABC, a television station (channel 8.2) that currently serves as the ABC affiliate for Monroe, Louisiana
