= KXUN =

KXUN may refer to:

- KXUN-LD, a low-power television station (channel 26, virtual 48) licensed to serve Fort Smith, Arkansas, United States
- KQRY-LD, a low-power television station (channel 43) licensed to serve Fort Smith, Arkansas, United States, which held the call signs KXUN-LP from 2004 to 2013 and KXUN-LD from 2013 to 2019
