= KLSE (TV) =

Monroe, Louisiana; United States
- Channels: Analog: 13 (VHF)

Programming
- Affiliations: NET (1957–1964)

Ownership
- Owner: Louisiana State Department of Education
- Operator: Louisiana Educational Television Commission

History
- First air date: March 9, 1957
- Last air date: July 1, 1964; (7 years, 114 days)
- Call sign meaning: Louisiana State Department of Education

Technical information
- ERP: Visual: 30 kW; Aural: 15 kW
- HAAT: 97.5 m (320 ft)
- Transmitter coordinates: 32°31′57.7″N 92°6′42.0″W

KLSE (channel 13) was a non-commercial educational television station in Monroe, Louisiana, United States. The station was owned by the Louisiana State Department of Education, and operated by the Louisiana Educational Television Commission, an agency of the Department of Education.

== History ==
After lifting the 1948 TV allocation "freeze" with its Sixth Report and Order (1952), the Federal Communications Commission (FCC) allocated channels 8, 13, and 43 to Monroe and West Monroe, with channel 13 reserved for non-commercial (educational) broadcasting. The State Department of Education signed KLSE on the air March 9, 1957, from a studio and transmitter facility on Forsythe Avenue. The facility was originally used by KFAZ-TV (channel 43) until KFAZ went dark May 1, 1954. It was the fourth television station in the Monroe–El Dorado, Arkansas area, after KFAZ-TV, KNOE-TV, and KRBB-TV (now KTVE), the 24th educational television station in the United States, and the first educational television station in Louisiana, going on-the-air almost one month prior to WYES-TV in New Orleans. KLSE's sign-on predates the debut of Louisiana Public Broadcasting's first station, WLPB-TV in Baton Rouge, by over 18 years.

KLSE was to be the first station in an intended statewide educational television network along the lines of Alabama Educational Television, which had been created two years earlier. LSU professor Lucille Woodward had urged Governor Robert Kennon to create the Educational Television Commission a few years earlier.

The state's limited budget meant the station signed on with a transmitter and antenna providing one tenth the maximum allowed effective radiated power for a station on channel 13. In addition, its tower was only half as tall as that of KNOE. This combination effectively limited KLSE's viewing area to Monroe and West Monroe, with viewing in nearby towns difficult. In addition, the amount of educational television programming available to the state from National Educational Television and other sources in the late 1950s and early 1960s was limited in comparison to the programming available to commercial stations.

KLSE could only have been viable as part of a statewide network, but the only educational licenses allocated to Louisiana outside of New Orleans were on UHF frequencies. UHF was not considered viable at the time, since most people could only watch UHF stations with an expensive converter. Even then, the picture was marginal at best. When it became apparent that there wouldn't be enough funding to sign on additional stations, the state shuttered KLSE in 1964. The Ark-La-Miss area would not receive another educational station until LPB went on-the-air in Monroe with KLTM, also operating on channel 13, on September 8, 1976. There is no record of any television station using the former KLSE facilities after its closure.
