= KFAZ =

KFAZ may refer to:

- KFAZ (Louisiana), a television station (channel 43) licensed to Monroe, Louisiana, United States, that operated from 1953 to 1954
- KKDJ-CD, a low-power television station (channel 18, virtual 8) licensed to serve Visalia, California, United States, which held the call sign KFAZ-CA from 2002 to 2023; see List of television stations in California
