= KFAZ (Louisiana) =

Television station in Monroe, Louisiana (1953–1954)

- Monroe, Louisiana; United States
- Channels: Analog: 43 (UHF)

Programming
- Affiliations: ABC (secondary)

Ownership
- Owner: J. O. "Red" Willett and Howard E. Griffith; (Delta Television, Inc.)

History
- First air date: August 11, 1953
- Last air date: May 1, 1954; (263 days)
- Call sign meaning: "Freda and Zoe" (wives of owners Howard Griffith and "Red" Willett)

Technical information
- ERP: 20 kW
- HAAT: 97.5 m (320 ft)
- Transmitter coordinates: 32°31′57.7″N 92°6′42″W

KFAZ (channel 43) was a television station in Monroe, Louisiana, United States. The station was owned by J. O. "Red" Willett, owner of a natural gas pipeline stringing company and Howard E. Griffith (later owner of AM radio station KUZN in West Monroe). KFAZ was the first TV station in the Monroe area, the third TV station in Louisiana (behind WDSU in New Orleans and WAFB in Baton Rouge), and the first on-the-air between Dallas and Jackson.

== History ==
After lifting the 1948 TV allocation "freeze" with its Sixth Report and Order (1952), the Federal Communications Commission (FCC) allocated channels 8 and 43 to Monroe, Louisiana. "Red" Willett and Howard Griffith incorporated Delta Television to file for one of the two available allocations. On December 10, 1952, Delta Television agreed to accept channel 43 because at the time it was simpler for applicants to be approved for a construction permit for a UHF station than a VHF station. Delta Television henceforth commenced construction of a two-studio facility at 2107 Forsythe Avenue in Monroe. The transmitter and tower were located at the studio building, as was common for television stations in the United States in the 1950s. The channel 8 allocation was pursued by former governor James A. Noe and would become KNOE-TV.

=== Equipment ===
KFAZ aired on August 11, 1953, with a Federal Telecommunication Labs (FTL) FTL-20B 1 kW (visual) transmitter and a Workshop Associates WA-25-43 14 dB gain antenna. The station's two studios shared two DuMont TA-142 Image Orthicon monochrome camera chains. One of the studio camera chains could also be used to broadcast film projected by either of two General Precision Labs 16mm motion picture projectors, with an FTL Poly-Efex dual flying spot monochrome slide scanner and effects mixer for televising still images (such as advertisement slides or station identification cards), and for producing limited special video effects. The noted equipment complement allowed for two-camera studio operations and switching to film without having to use a Monoscope test pattern or still slide while moving a studio camera into position for film operations.

=== Programming ===
As was typical of an early UHF TV station, KFAZ bought some programming from film houses, and produced local content in-house, with minimal networked programming. KFAZ produced the Ouachita Valley Jamboree, a television adaptation of the then-popular Louisiana Hayride radio show genre. One of the hosts was Shreveport guitarist Merle Kilgore, called "The Tall Texan" on-the-air.

KFAZ bought a service called the "Station Starter Plan" from Consolidated Television Sales, with nine programs:

- Front Page Detective
- Public Prosecutor
- Hollywood Half-Hour
- Jackson and Jill
- Ringside with the Rasslers
- Paradise Island
- Crusader Rabbit
- TV Closeups
- Going Places (with Uncle George)

KFAZ also bought four programs from the NBC Film Division:

- The Visitor (called The Doctor when broadcast as an NBC series)
- Dangerous Assignment
- The Inner Sanctum
- Hopalong Cassidy

=== Demise ===
The studio equipment complement was adequate to produce live programming or to air films of the quality expected at the time. The station's radiated power and antenna height, however, were not enough to produce a decent image in locations more than 10 miles (16 km) from the transmitter with the TV sets of the mid-1950s. To receive KFAZ, the owner of a typical mid-1950s TV set would have to buy a converter box and UHF TV antenna, an outlay of almost one third the price of an economy-model TV set of the day when including installation costs (it was not until 1964 that TV sets in the United States were required to be equipped with built-in UHF tuners). Some TV receivers could be ordered with a UHF tuner, but very few were so equipped in North Louisiana in the 1950s. KFAZ estimated 16,500 sets were able to view their programming as of May 1954, indicating a lack of UHF-capable sets and the short range of their signal.

Under the circumstances, the major networks balked at affiliating with KFAZ. For the same reason, the station found it difficult to sell advertising; no advertiser wanted to buy time on a station that so few people watched.

KFAZ's difficulties became acute with KNOE-TV going on-the-air on channel 8 about five weeks after KFAZ. KNOE's 229 kW radiated from a 774-foot (236 m) tower and could be received within a 35-mile (56 km) radius of its transmitter, with decent picture quality and without the need for a converter or UHF antenna. KNOE estimated 109,870 TV sets were able to receive its signal. It also carried programming from all four networks of the day—CBS, NBC, ABC and DuMont. KFAZ was forced to make do with those ABC shows not "cleared" by KNOE, making acquisition of marketable shows difficult.

Sinking under the weight of losses of $100,000 ($789,000 in 2009 dollars) in only eight months on the air, KFAZ went dark May 1, 1954. Delta Television applied for a channel 13 allocation but was not successful. Monroe would later receive a channel 13 allocation, but it would be reserved for non-commercial educational use. The Ark-La-Miss would not see a successful UHF station until KLAA (now KARD) signed-on channel 14 on October 6, 1974, 10 years after the federal government mandated inclusion of UHF reception capability for all television sets sold in the United States.

=== Facility use post-demise ===
The KFAZ facility was later used by the Louisiana Department of Education for KLSE channel 13. The transmitter and antenna were replaced with equipment suitable for use on channel 13. After KLSE went dark in 1964, no other television station used the former KFAZ facilities.

The channel 43 allocation would eventually be used by KEJB-TV from 2003 to 2010.
