= KEJB =

KEJB may refer to:

- KEJB (AM), a radio station (1480 AM) licensed to serve Eureka, California, United States
- KEJB (TV), a defunct television station (channel 43) formerly licensed to serve El Dorado, Arkansas, United States
