= KLSE =

KLSE may refer to:

- Bursa Malaysia, formerly known as the Kuala Lumpur Stock Exchange
- The ICAO airport code of La Crosse Regional Airport in La Crosse, Wisconsin, United States
- KLSE (FM), a radio station (90.7 FM) licensed to Rochester, Minnesota, United States
- KZSE, a radio station (91.7 FM) licensed to Rochester, Minnesota, which held the call sign KLSE-FM until 2011
- KLSE (TV), a defunct educational television station (channel 13) in Monroe, Louisiana, United States
