= KMYA-DT =

Television station in Camden, Arkansas

KMYA-DT and KMYA-LD

KMYA-DT: Camden, Arkansas; KMYA-LD: Sheridan–Little Rock, Arkansas; United States
- Channels for KMYA-DT: Digital: 18 (UHF); Virtual: 49
- Channels for KMYA-LD: Digital: 25 (UHF); Virtual: 49
- Branding: MeTV Little Rock

Programming
- Affiliations: 49.1: MeTV; for others, see § Subchannels

Ownership
- Owner: LR Telecasting, LLC

History
- Founded: KMYA-DT: September 4, 1998; KMYA-LD: May 22, 1986
- First air date: KMYA-DT: June 7, 1999; KMYA-LD: December 6, 2001
- Former call signs: KMYA-DT: KKYK-TV (1999–2001); KYPX (2001–2006); KKYK-DT (2006–2011); KMYA-LD: K05IS (1986–2001); KWBF-LP (2001–2008); KEJC-LP (2008–2011); KMYA-LP (2011–2018)
- Former channel number: KMYA-DT: Analog: 49 (UHF, 1999–2006); Digital: 44 (UHF, 2005–2006), 49 (UHF, 2006–2018); KMYA-LD: Analog: 7 (VHF, 2001–2006), 47 (UHF, 2006–2012)
- Former affiliations: KMYA-DT: The WB (1999–2001); Pax TV (2001–2005); RTN (2005–February 2009); This TV (February–August 2009); Tuff TV (August 2009–2011)

Technical information
- Licensing authority: FCC
- Facility ID: KMYA-DT: 86534; KMYA-LD: 24263
- Class: KMYA-LD: LD
- ERP: KMYA-DT: 530 kW; KMYA-LD: 15 kW
- HAAT: KMYA-DT: 182.7 m (599 ft); KMYA-LD: 206.4 m (677 ft)
- Transmitter coordinates: KMYA-DT: 33°16′15.2″N 92°42′14.2″W; KMYA-LD: 34°47′31.3″N 92°28′38.6″W

Links
- Public license information: KMYA-DT: Public file; LMS; KMYA-LD: Public file; LMS
- Website: www.littlerockmetv.com

KMYA-DT (channel 49) is a television station licensed to Camden, Arkansas, United States, serving the Little Rock area as an affiliate of MeTV. Owned by LR Telecasting, LLC, the station maintains studios on Shackleford Drive (near Shackleford Road and Markham Street) in the Beverly Hills section of northwestern Little Rock, and its transmitter is located four miles (6.4 km) northwest of El Dorado, along Arkansas Highway 335.

KMYA-LD (channel 25) in Sheridan operates as a low-power translator of KMYA-DT for the immediate Little Rock metropolitan area; its transmitter is located at the Shinall Mountain antenna farm, near the city's Chenal Valley neighborhood.

Although KMYA brands itself as a Little Rock station and is officially assigned by Nielsen to the Little Rock–Pine Bluff market, the station's Union County–based transmitter is located in and serves most of the El Dorado–Monroe, Louisiana market—which receives MeTV locally via Columbia-licensed KMLU (channel 11)—and its signal contour does not reach Little Rock proper (extending only as close as southern Dallas, Cleveland and Clark counties). Therefore, KMYA relies on the Sheridan translator, and on cable and satellite distribution to cover the entire Little Rock market. KMYA is also relayed in the Fort Smith–Fayetteville market on digital subchannels of Univision affiliates KQRY-LD (channel 43) in Fort Smith and KWNL-CD (channel 31) in Winslow (both owned by Pinnacle Media, headed by Larry Morton, founder of former KMYA parent Equity Media Holdings).

== History ==
The station traces its existence to K22FA (channel 22, now Univision affiliate KLRA-CD on channel 20), a low-power station serving the immediate Little Rock area that was founded by the locally based Kaleidoscope Affiliates LLC (founded by Larry E. Morton, and renamed Equity Broadcasting Corporation in 1998), which received Federal Communications Commission (FCC) approval for the construction permit on May 15, 1995. The low-power station, which later changed its callsign to KKYK-LP on August 13, 1996, originally operated as an affiliate of Network One; in January 1997, the station became an affiliate of The WB, allowing Little Rock-area viewers that could receive the signal to watch the network's programs without subscribing to cable or satellite service. (For the first two years of the network's existence, The WB had exclusively been available on Comcast and other cable and satellite providers in the Little Rock market via the superstation feed of Chicago affiliate WGN-TV [later conventional basic cable channel WGN America, now NewsNation].) The station branded itself as "WB22", using a derivative of the logo then used by Denver affiliate KWGN-TV.

The full-power channel 49—for which the construction permit, filed on March 31, 1997, was granted to Equity by the FCC on August 20, 1998—first signed on the air in Camden on June 7, 1999, as KKYK-TV, with KKYK-LP becoming its repeater. The station has operated from the Shackleford Drive facility—which continue to house the station's operations as KMYA, and at the time had served the master control hub for all of Equity Broadcasting's television stations nationwide—since its sign-on. Supplementing WB prime time and children's programming, KKYK-TV/LP—which, as a WB affiliate, usually branded by its call letters but occasionally identified as "WB 22/49"—carried a blend of first-run syndicated shows, recent and classic off-network sitcoms and drama series, animated and live-action syndicated children's programs, and movies in late-night and on weekends, and by 2000, St. Louis Cardinals Major League Baseball games. Following Equity's purchase of a 49% interest in Arkansas Sports Entertainment in March 2000 (it purchased the remaining 51% in October 2001), channel 49 began televising Arkansas RiverBlades ECHL hockey and Arkansas Twisters AF2 football games (many of which were shown on tape delay after WB and, later, Pax programming), starting with the Twisters' 2000 season and the Riverblades' 2000–01 season respectively.

On January 29, 2001, Equity transferred KKYK's WB network and syndicated programming to Pax TV owned-and-operated station KYPX (channel 42, now MyNetworkTV affiliate KARZ-TV), which the group had purchased from Paxson Communications [now Ion Media] in March 2000, a decision made by the company to provide The WB more substantial over-the-air coverage within the Little Rock–Pine Bluff market. (That station initially changed its callsign to KLRA-TV upon the switch, then to KWBF-TV on August 22.) The former channel 42 intellectual unit—call letters, Pax TV affiliation and local programming—concurrently moved to channel 49, which adopted the KYPX call letters. Around that time, KKYK as well as KWBF frequently aired ABC sports telecasts and occasional non-sports programs preempted by KATV (channel 7) due to that station's commitments to Arkansas Razorbacks sporting events or to run infomercials for additional revenue. On June 30, 2005, KYPX and its Little Rock repeater—which retained the KKYK-LP calls—disaffiliated from Pax TV (as that network was relaunching as i: Independent Television), and became the flagship station of Equity's Retro Television Network classic television service. On June 30, 2006, the station's callsign was modified to KKYK-DT, becoming among the few U.S. television stations to bear the "-DT" suffix. KKYK's Little Rock-based analog repeater was re-designated as a Class A station, with its call letters being modified to KKYK-CA (formerly broadcasting on channel 22, KKYK-CA was forced to move to UHF channel 20 to accommodate KATV's digital signal).

On January 4, 2009, the station lost access to Retro Television Network programming amid a dispute over a service contract between Equity and Luken Communications (which had acquired RTN in June 2008, and moved RTN's operations to its headquarters in Chattanooga, Tennessee) that expired that morning without renewal, resulting in Luken terminating the network's agreements with KKYK and the rest of its Equity-owned affiliates; (RTN—under its new modified initialism, RTV—later affiliated with KATV, being carried on that station's second digital subchannel.) The station also reneged on a deal with the Southland Conference to carry University of Central Arkansas Bears basketball games in the interim.

The station became an affiliate of This TV on February 1, 2009, lasting five months until August 1, when it switched to Tuff TV. (This TV would later resurface on the DT2 subchannel of Fox affiliate KLRT-TV [channel 16] in July 2012, lasting until the subchannel was dropped after Nexstar Broadcasting Group partner company Mission Broadcasting took over operations in February 2013.) On April 10, 2009, Equity announced a fire sale of its television stations; KKYK had been set an asking price of $15 million, the highest price for any of the stations being auctioned. In the auction, which took place on April 16, KKYK-DT and KKYK-CA were sold alongside Equity's four other Little Rock stations for $1.15 million to the Bank of Little Rock, which acquired the station through the subsidiary Hallmark National Mortgage Corporation. The sale received FCC approval on December 13, 2009, and was approved on January 7, 2010. On January 3, 2011, the original repeater began broadcasting digitally as KKYK-CD. The full-power station's call letters were changed to KMYA-DT on July 8, 2011; the station became a MeTV affiliate on that date.

On November 3, 2011, Hallmark National sold KMYA to Ellis-Wilson, LLC (a company controlled by Equity founder Larry Morton and former Equity executive Greg Fees) for $1 million. The sale received FCC approval on February 27, 2012, and was finalized on March 30. On February 28, 2013, the original KKYK-CD swapped call letters with KLRA-CD (channel 30), taking over the Univision affiliation of the former KLRA; Sheridan-licensed KMYA-LP (channel 47, now KMYA-LD on channel 49), which acted as a repeater of KWBF-TV until that station's 2009 sale to Nexstar Broadcasting Group, then took over as the station's Little Rock repeater. On June 17, 2014, Ellis-Wilson sold KMYA-DT and KMYA-LP to I Squared Media LLC (principally owned by Stuttgart-based hotelier Shashwat Goyal) for $1.9 million; the sale received FCC approval on August 21, and was finalized on September 18.

On January 5, 2016, I Square Media sold the KMYA stations to LR Telecasting LLC (owned by William Pollack, part-owner of Pollack/Belz Communications, and Gina Robbins) for $2.75 million. The sale's completion was held up for 26 months amid a legal dispute filed in the U.S. District Court for the Eastern District of Arkansas involving Soul of the South's investors as to whether I Square Media or Rock City Media LLC (which allegedly bought the station in 2014, but never filed a transfer application to the FCC) legally owned the KMYA licenses and how proceeds would be shared if the license was resold in the spectrum auction. The sale received FCC approval on June 21, 2017, and was finalized on March 21, 2018.

== Newscasts ==
KKYK-LP (then on channel 22) launched a news department on September 15, 1997, when it began producing an hour-long prime time newscast on Monday through Friday evenings. Titled News @ Nine, it was the first prime time newscast ever attempted in the Little Rock–Pine Bluff market, preceding the premiere of KLRT's 9 p.m. newscast—launched in March 2004—by seven years; it was anchored by Doug Krile (who served as the station's news and public affairs director, and joined KKYK following a six-year tenure as weeknight anchor at NBC affiliate KARK-TV [channel 4]) and Tamara Henry, who were joined by chief meteorologist Mark Frankum and sports director Tim Jernigan; the station also hired additional news department staff previously employed with KARK, KATV and KTHV. The newscast was an early adopter of streaming media, having been streamed on KKYK's website throughout its run. Originally conducted from a conventional set, in October 1998, the newscast began to originate from a virtual set designed by Devlin Design Group and powered by software from Discreet Logic. (Due to tracking problems during camera shot transitions, the $750,000 Discreet system was replaced with a virtual set system from Orad Hi-Tech Systems in February 1999.)

The newscast ultimately struggled to build an audience, regularly losing a substantial share of its WB prime time lead-in (pulling in, at best, a 1 rating on certain nights) and even being outperformed by syndicated Friends reruns that followed the 9 p.m. broadcast starting in September 1998. KKYK shuttered its news department on September 4, 1999, the day after what became its last 9 p.m. newscast. (Syndicated sitcoms began filling the timeslot the following Monday.) Krile stayed on as channel 49's public affairs director; however, 16 news staffers, who were not notified of the department's closure until they reported to work on September 6, were laid off—with Henry, Frankum and Jernigan having to serve the remainder of their contracts through early 2000. Krile had attributed the newscast's flagging viewership and demise on various factors, including KKYK's limited broadcast range and cable distribution, The WB's younger-skewing audience tending not to be avid news viewers, and insufficient investment into the news operation. Channel 22 continued to produce the midday news/interview program Arkansas View and the weekend local sports program Sports Jam (both of which premiered in September 1998 and were cancelled by December 2000) as well as live news and weather updates throughout the day.

As a Pax affiliate, in October 2001, Equity Broadcasting entered into a news share agreement with KATV to provide rebroadcasts of select local programs from the ABC affiliate on KYPX. On November 1, channel 49 began offering rebroadcasts of KATV's weeknight 6 p.m. newscast (at 9 p.m.), of its news/lifestyle program Good Morning Arkansas (on a two-hour delay from the initial 9 a.m. live broadcast on KATV) and of its Sunday sports discussion show Sportsweek (on Monday nights). (Channel 49 was among a relative minority of Pax stations to have maintained a news share agreement with a station affiliated with a network competitor to NBC, then a minority shareholder in Pax TV parent Paxson Communications.) Coinciding with Pax's reformatting as i: Independent Television (as well as Paxson-owned Pax stations terminating their news share agreements with other "Big Three" network stations amid that company's financial troubles), KYPX's agreement with KATV ended on June 30, 2005. Then on July 1, KYPX began producing a half-hour 10 p.m. newscast; anchored by Krile (who began anchoring a similar early-evening program on KWBF on February 21), the program featured a wrap-up of the day's headlines, long-form discussion of high-profile national and local stories, and technology news; the program (along with the KWBF 5:30 newscast) was cancelled in August 2006. (Krile remained with KWBF/KYPX as Equity's corporate director of news and public relations until February 2007.)

== Technical information ==
=== Subchannels ===
The station's signal is multiplexed:

Subchannels of KMYA-DT and KMYA-LD
Subchannel	Res.	Short name	Programming
49.1	720p	KMYADT1	MeTV
49.2	480i	Cozi	Cozi TV
49.3	480i	Heroes	Heroes & Icons
49.4	480i	StartTV	Start TV
49.5	480i	SonLife	SonLife
49.6	480i	DABL	Dabl

=== Analog-to-digital conversion; spectrum repack ===
KMYA-DT (as KKYK-DT) signed on its digital signal on UHF channel 49 on April 22, 2005. The station shut down its analog signal and flash-cut its digital signal into operation on UHF 49 on June 30, 2006. The station's digital signal had been operating at reduced power (70 kW under a Special Temporary Authority) and was relayed on the 42.2 subchannel of then-sister station KWBF (now KARZ-TV), until Nexstar Broadcasting Group assumed ownership of channel 42 on January 31, 2009.

As a part of the broadcast frequency repacking process following the 2016–17 FCC incentive auction, KMYA-DT relocated its digital signal to UHF channel 18 on November 30, 2018, using virtual channel 49.
