= Soul of the South Television =

American TV network

- "This is Home"
- Type: Regional Broadcast Network
- Country: United States
- Broadcast area: Nationwide
- Headquarters: Little Rock, Arkansas

Ownership
- Owner: SSN Media Group, LP

History
- Founded: 2011
- Launched: May 27, 2013; 13 years ago
- Founder: Edwin Avent; Carl McCaskill; Larry Morton

Links
- Website: ssn.tv

Soul of the South Television (sometimes referred to as Soul of the South TV or just Soul of the South) is an African-American-focused regional broadcast network owned by SSN Media Group, LP. It primarily broadcasts in the Southern United States and secondarily in other high African-American populated cities in the north.

Soul of the South uses the C.A.S.H. (Central Automated Satellite Hub) system, and a computer server “cloud-based system” originally constructed by the defunct Equity Broadcasting to send its feed to its affiliated stations. It sought affiliations from full–power television stations, Class A TV, low–power TV stations, digital subchannels and cable outlets.

Soul of the South announced plans to rename the network to Slang TV by the end of the year 2019, but as of January 2020, it has never been changed.

== History ==
Soul of the South was founded in 2011 by Edwin Avent, Carl McCaskill and Larry Morton. It purchased assets from the bankrupted Equity Media Holdings including the studio and production facilities of KKYK-TV and the C.A.S.H. system. It was planning to broadcast five hours of news per day with assistance from Independent News Network with four regional bureaus. It was also seeking to purchase TV stations. Expected original programming was: a hip hop music show; family reunion-featured programming; Drum Majors, concerning music at mostly black colleges; Radioface, an unscripted comedy; and Southern Soul Stories, a documentary series about southern African-American icons and southern events.

By April 2012, Soul of the South was working to get additional affiliates to reach 50 markets for a two wave launch.

Originally planned to launch in the first quarter of 2012 and moved to fall 2012, Soul of the South instead launched on May 27, 2013, with an announced 30 market launch. However, according to RabbitEars.info, it only has 11 broadcast affiliates covering 14% of the nation. Soul of the South agreed to carry some games from the first season of the Fall Experimental Football League in October and November 2014.

In April 2015, Soul of the South began dropping affiliates due to financial distress and began winding down operations. The network's social media channels had largely gone defunct in late 2015. By this time, it aired infomercials, reruns of D.C. Breakdown, and Independent News Network newscasts during the day.

In 2018, Soul of the South was purchased by a group of investors led by Doug McHenry. In that same year, the network gained cable coverage on Comcast and Frontier's cable lineups. In April 2019, McHenry announced Soul of the South would rebrand as Slang TV by the end of the year, with a shift to a schedule mainly featuring current-day African-American films. At the same time, HC2 Station Group, Inc. inked an affiliation deal with the refreshed network to bring the network to 29 new markets, covering 44% of the network's demographic.

== Corporate ==
=== SSN Funding, LP ===
SSN Funding, LP
- Trade name: Soul of the South
- Company type: Limited partnership
- Industry: Broadcasting
- Founded: Little Rock, Arkansas (2011)
- Founders: Edwin Avent; Carl McCaskill; Larry Morton
- Headquarters: Little Rock, Arkansas, U.S.
- Number of locations: 30
- Divisions: Southern Soul Broadcasting; Soul of the South Television
- Subsidiaries: SSN Networks, Inc.

SSN Funding, LP, also known as SSN Media Group, SOS Media Holdings, and doing business as Soul of the South, is a limited partnership that owns SSN Networks, Southern Soul Broadcasting and Soul of the South Television, as well as formerly owning Media Gateway (Gateway Media Technologies after its founding, then SSN Gateway Media Technologies upon its acquisition by Soul of the South; gained its current name upon sale by Soul of the South). The institutional investors include Arkansas Development Finance Authority, Arkansas Economic Development Commission, and Arkansas Capital Corporation.

SSN Funding purchased the former Equity Plaza building from One Bank & Trust in December 2013 for the Soul of the South businesses. In May 2014, the building ownership moved from SSN Funding to Rock City Media LLC. Rock City Media was "a funding vehicle to support Soul of the South’s tax-credit financial package". By April 2006, the FBI started looking into the flow of government money into the Soul of the South venture.

=== Southern Soul Broadcasting ===
Southern Soul Broadcasting is the station operating unit operating stations in Chicago, Philadelphia, Tallahassee, Montgomery, Jackson, MS, Raleigh, NC, and its Little Rock full power flagship station.

In February 2015, KM LPTV, which operates stations in Chicago and Milwaukee, filed a lawsuit claiming breach of contract and not making required payments.

=== Media Gateway ===
Media Gateway (formerly Gateway Media Technologies, then SSN Gateway Media Technologies) is a TV outsourcing company owned by Matthew Davidge. The company provides TV control panel and newscasts.

Media Gateway had 60 television stations, three TV networks and two radio network as clients as of June 2017. Two out of the three TV networks are Youtoo America (formerly America One) and Soul of the South Network.

Jeffrey Lyle was chief technology officer for Soul of the South and co-owner of SSN Media Gateway, LLC with Dr. Sev Hrywnak of Chicago, an entrepreneurial podiatrist; Edwin Avent and two Little Rock businessman long-associated with the property, Larry Morton and Greg Fess. By June 2015, SSN Gateway Media Technologies had acquired Independent News Network. At that time, INN had hired Anne Imanuel, the wife of Mike Preston, the new director of the Arkansas Economic Development Commission, as an anchor. The commission had a past due loan from the Soul of the South company group.

With financial difficulties, SSN Funding partners' ownership interest in SSN Gateway Media Technologies was purchased by Matthew Davidge, owner of client station WRDE-LD, as of February 6, 2016. He also purchased from Rock City Media the former Equity Plaza, where SSN Gateway Media Technologies was based, to continue operation there, while taking over the mortgage. Media Gateway had 12 television stations, three TV networks and a radio network as clients as of June 2016. By June 2017, Gateway increased the number of TV station clients from 12 to 60 and added another radio network.

== See also ==
- Aspire
- BET
- BET Her
- Revolt
- TV One
