= KARD (TV) =

Television station in West Monroe, Louisiana

- West Monroe–Monroe, Louisiana; El Dorado, Arkansas; United States
- City: West Monroe, Louisiana
- Channels: Digital: 19 (UHF); Virtual: 14
- Branding: KARD Fox 14; Fox 14 News; ArkLaMiss CW (DT2)

Programming
- Affiliations: 14.1: Fox; 14.2: CW+; for others, see § Subchannels

Ownership
- Owner: Nexstar Media Group; (Nexstar Media Inc.)
- Sister stations: KTVE

History
- First air date: August 19, 1967
- Former call signs: KUZN-TV (1967–1969); KYAY-TV (1969–1974); KLAA (1974–1982)
- Former channel numbers: Analog: 39 (UHF, 1967–1974), 14 (UHF, 1974–2009); Digital: 36 (UHF, 2003–2018)
- Former affiliations: Independent (1967–1968, 1970–1971); Dark (1968–1970, 1971–1974); ABC, NBC, CBS (secondary, 1970–1971); NBC (1974–1981); ABC (1981–1994); Fox (secondary, 1986–1994)
- Call sign meaning: Arkansas Delta, also alludes to "card"

Technical information
- Licensing authority: FCC
- Facility ID: 3658
- ERP: 691 kW
- HAAT: 523.5 m (1,718 ft)
- Transmitter coordinates: 32°5′42.6″N 92°10′34.3″W

Links
- Public license information: Public file; LMS
- Website: www.myarklamiss.com

KARD (channel 14) is a television station licensed to West Monroe, Louisiana, United States, serving the Monroe, Louisiana–El Dorado, Arkansas, market as an affiliate of the Fox network and an owned-and-operated station of The CW Plus. It is owned by Nexstar Media Group, which acquired the station in 2003 as part of its purchase of Quorum Broadcasting, and also holds a majority stake in The CW. Nexstar provides certain services to El Dorado–licensed NBC affiliate KTVE (channel 10) through a local marketing agreement (LMA) with Mission Broadcasting. The two stations share studios on Pavilion Road in West Monroe; KARD's transmitter is located in Columbia, Louisiana.

In addition to its own digital signal, KARD's primary channel is simulcast in high definition on KTVE's second digital subchannel (10.2) from a transmitter northwest of Huttig, Arkansas.

== History ==
The station that became KARD first signed on on August 19, 1967, as KUZN-TV on channel 39 and was owned by Howard E. Griffith as a television counterpart of KUZN (1310 AM). This was Griffith's second foray into television, as he was the co-owner of Monroe's first TV station, KFAZ, which signed on in 1953 but went off the air the next year. The station aired a local newscast, the BBC series Panorama, and old Western movies. The station ceased operations on January 12, 1968, but was sold to Northeast Louisiana Broadcasting Corporation.

Channel 39 resumed operations on August 31, 1970, as KYAY-TV. During this incarnation, KYAY aired news and off-network Westerns and movies, as well as ABC, NBC and CBS programming not carried on KNOE-TV and KTVE, such as That Girl, The Mod Squad, Hawaii Five-O, The Courtship of Eddie's Father, The Lawrence Welk Show, Engelbert Humperdinck, The NBC Tuesday Night Movie, and The Merv Griffin Show. KYAY proved to be no more successful than KUZN had been, and went dark on August 16, 1971.

In 1974, the station returned with a new call sign, KLAA, and a reallocation to channel 14. It was an NBC affiliate. Its owners operated the station under Monroe Television, Inc., with its largest owner being Kenneth Meyer of Springfield, Missouri, who also owned and signed on then-ABC affiliate KMTC in that city. Since 1972, when KTVE changed its affiliation to ABC, it and KNOE-TV carried selected NBC programs during the hours when their primary networks (CBS in KNOE's case) were not broadcasting (with some exceptions), but never the full NBC lineup. KLAA debuted on October 6, 1974, giving southern Arkansas and northeastern Louisiana full service from all "Big Three" networks for the first time ever. Today, channel 39 is occupied by KMCT-TV, a religious station, and that station now occupies KUZN/KYAY/KLAA/KARD's former studios.

On December 6, 1981, KLAA became an ABC affiliate, while KTVE retook the NBC affiliation that it held in the 1950s and 1960s. Exactly a year later, the station changed its calls to KARD, with the station manager citing the call sign change a reflection on the station's progress at the time. In 1984, Woods Communications, owned by Charles Woods of Alabama, purchased KARD and KMTC from Meyer Communications. In 1986, Woods relocated the station's transmitter from its West Monroe studios to Caldwell Parish, Louisiana, and increased the station's power to 5 million watts. This change enabled KARD to have at least Grade B coverage in a region encompassing all of Northeast Louisiana including portions of the Alexandria and Shreveport markets.

KARD began airing some Fox programming in late nights when that network started up in 1986 and in the same year became the first station in the Monroe area (and one of the first in Louisiana) to broadcast in stereo. Fox programs the station aired included The Simpsons, In Living Color, Married... with Children, and America's Most Wanted. In addition to KARD's secondary Fox affiliation, starting in 1991, Foxnet was available for cable subscribers in Monroe. During 1991, KARD relocated from its original studios on Parkwood Avenue to the newly built Glenwood Mall, where they remained until moving into their current studios in West Monroe's Industrial Park in 2000. When NYPD Blue premiered on ABC in 1993, KARD preempted the program due to concerns about its content.

In 1993, Woods filed for bankruptcy, and Banam Broadcasting, a subsidiary of BankAmerica, assumed control of KARD. The next year, Banam dropped ABC to take Fox full-time; the move followed Fox picking up NFL football that year, and was also prompted by competition from the then-glut of stronger-rated ABC stations from outlying markets. KARD was the first station in the nation to switch from a Big Three network to Fox during the U.S. television network affiliate switches of 1994, doing so April 17, 1994. The surrounding ABC affiliates (mainly Alexandria's KLAX-TV and Shreveport's KTBS-TV) continued to be the main conduit for ABC in the market via antenna or cable carriage (KLAX even capitalized on its expanded footprint into the Monroe market during this time by branding itself on-air as "Louisiana's Superstation") until December 1998, when KAQY signed on.

Banam sold KARD along with three of its stations–KDEB-TV (the former KMTC); WTVW in Evansville, Indiana; and KLBK-TV in Lubbock, Texas–to Petracom Broadcasting in 1995. In 1998, Petracom sold KARD to Quorum Broadcasting, which was absorbed by Nexstar Broadcasting Group in 2003.

KARD's logo 2012 – October 2014

In 2002, Piedmont Television, then-owner of KTVE, took over KARD's operations under a local marketing agreement (LMA). Despite KTVE being the senior partner, the two stations' operations were consolidated in KARD's newer facility in West Monroe, which opened in 2000. In addition to a common sales and promotions staff, the KTVE news department produces KARD's newscast. Piedmont's control of the duopoly officially came to an end on January 16, 2008, when KTVE was sold to Mission Broadcasting. This resulted in Nexstar, already the owner of KARD, taking over control of KTVE under a local sales agreement (LSA).

== Newscasts ==
KARD airs four hours of weekday newscasts—a two-hour morning newscast at 7 a.m., two half-hour weeknight newscasts at 5:30 p.m. and 6:30 p.m., and an hour-long newscast at 9 p.m. Its current generation of newscasts began in November 2001, shortly before it entered an SSA with KTVE.

== Technical information ==
=== Subchannels ===
The station's digital signal is multiplexed:

Subchannels of KARD
Subchannel	Res.	Short name	Programming
14.1	720p	KARD-DT	Fox
14.2	720p	CW Plus	The CW Plus
14.3	480i	Grit	Grit
14.4	480i	Antenna	Antenna TV

In March 2009, KARD and KTVE informed the Federal Communications Commission (FCC) that they needed to end analog operations sooner than June 12, 2009 (the earliest they could do so is April 16). KARD stated that a transmitter tube failed, bringing power down to 50%; KTVE claimed that its power was at 40%. Used parts were deemed unreliable, and staffers had to travel 50 miles (80 km) to the transmitter from the studio; two to three visits per week were required to monitor the analog facilities, according to Nexstar. The FCC denied the request based on the fact that they are the last two analog channels in the market.

=== Analog-to-digital conversion ===
KARD shut down its analog signal, over UHF channel 14, on April 16, 2009. The station's digital signal remained on its pre-transition UHF channel 36, using virtual channel 14.
