= KMCT-TV =

Television station in West Monroe, Louisiana

- West Monroe–Monroe, Louisiana; United States
- City: West Monroe, Louisiana
- Channels: Digital: 22 (UHF); Virtual: 39

Programming
- Affiliations: 39.1: Religious Independent; for others, see § Subchannels

Ownership
- Owner: Carolina Christian Broadcasting; (KMCT Holdings, LLC)

History
- First air date: April 7, 1986
- Former channel numbers: Analog: 39 (UHF, 1986–2009); Digital: 38 (UHF, 2009–2018); Virtual: 38 (2017–2018)
- Former affiliations: Pax TV (1998–2005); Religious Independent (2005–2013); MyNetworkTV (2013–2016); The Walk TV (secondary)
- Call sign meaning: Monroe Christian Television

Technical information
- Licensing authority: FCC
- Facility ID: 38584
- ERP: 25 kW
- HAAT: 92 m (302 ft)
- Transmitter coordinates: 32°30′21.2″N 92°8′55.6″W
- Translator(s): KLMB-CD 23 El Dorado, AR

Links
- Public license information: Public file; LMS
- Website: kmct.tv

KMCT-TV (channel 39) is a religious independent television station licensed to West Monroe, Louisiana, United States. The station is owned by Carolina Christian Broadcasting through subsidiary KMCT Holdings, LLC. KMCT-TV's studios and transmitter are located on Parkwood Drive in West Monroe.

== History ==
KMCT was established by Rev. Jimmy Thompson and his company Carolina Christian Broadcasting in 1983. Two weeks after the station signed on, Rev. Charles Reed join the staff and assumed operations via his company, Lamb Broadcasting, when Thompson incurred financial troubles upon signing on a station in Oregon in 1989. In 1993, Reed purchased the station outright. The station moved to its current location on Parkwood Drive in 1991. It was an affiliate of Pax TV (now Ion Television) from the network's inception in 1998 until 2005. The station was bought by First Assembly of God of West Monroe in November 2009 when it became The Voice Network. In 2013, KMCT-TV became a MyNetworkTV affiliate, with religious programming moved to DT2.

KMCT-DT1 2013 logo

In October 2014, the station's antenna collapsed during severe weather, knocking KMCT programming off the air and from cable. By March 2015, the station was back on Comcast cable, and in September 2015, the station relaunched with a low power signal. In the interim, religious programming from KMCT aired on a subchannel of its former sister station KWMS-LP. In late August 2016, KMCT began operating at full power, but eventually decided to drop all secular programming and become a religious independent station, with Sonlife remaining on the second subchannel. MyNetworkTV went unseen in the market for several months until Gray Television picked it up in late 2017 for their KNOE-DT3 subchannel (which is an affiliate of The CW Plus), airing the service's programming from 1:30 to 3:30 a.m., overlaying default network-fed overnight paid programming from The CW Plus. In 2018, KMCT added five subchannels: Ion Television to channel 39.2 (displacing Sonlife to 39.5), QVC Over the Air to channel 39.3, HSN to channel 39.4, Quest to channel 39.6, and Justice Network to channel 39.7. The station also has a secondary affiliation with The Walk TV, airing programming from that network overnight.

On May 1, 2018, it was announced that Carolina Christian Broadcasting would reacquire KMCT-TV for $600,000. CCB would operate the station under a time brokerage agreement prior to the sale's closing on June 19, 2019.

== Newscasts ==
From 2001 until 2005, KMCT aired rebroadcasts of NBC affiliate KTVE's newscasts at 6:30 and 10:30 p.m. as part of an agreement with NBC and Pax.

== Technical information ==
=== Subchannels ===
The station's signal is multiplexed:

Subchannels of KMCT-TV
Channel	Res.	Short name	Programming
39.1	1080i	KMCT-HD	Main KMCT-TV programming
39.2	480i	ION	Ion
39.3	480i	DEFY	Defy
39.4	480i	OUTLAW	Outlaw
39.5	480i	JEWELRY	Jewelry TV
39.6	480i	GLN	Greater Love TV
39.7	480i	MSPHERE	MovieSphere Gold
39.8	480i	WALK	The Walk TV
39.9	480i	SBN	SonLife
39.10	480i	QVC	QVC
39.11	480i	HARMONY	

=== Analog-to-digital conversion ===
KMCT-TV shut down its analog signal, over UHF channel 39, on February 17, 2009, the original target date on which full-power television stations in the United States were to transition from analog to digital broadcasts under federal mandate (which was later pushed back to June 12, 2009). The station's digital signal remained on its pre-transition UHF channel 38, using virtual channel 39.

== Prior broadcast facility uses ==
The building and tower on Parkwood Drive in West Monroe used by KMCT-TV is the former facility of KLAA channel 14 (now Fox affiliate KARD-TV). KLAA signed on August 6, 1974, and moved to new facilities in 1983. Prior to KLAA, the facility was used by KYAY channel 39 from KYAY's sign-on August 9, 1967, until going off the air August 16, 1971.
