= KWMS-LP =

Television station in West Monroe, Louisiana (2001–2017)

West Monroe, Louisiana; United States
- Channels: Digital: 18 (UHF); Virtual: 18
- Branding: FFTV 18

Programming
- Affiliations: Independent (2001–2011); RTV (2011–2013); MeTV (2013–2015); Heroes & Icons (2015–2017)

Ownership
- Owner: First Baptist Church of West Monroe; (Sonrise Communications, Inc.)

History
- First air date: November 20, 2001
- Last air date: August 6, 2017; (15 years, 259 days)
- Former call signs: K17FV (2001–2002)
- Call sign meaning: West Monroe Sonrise (station owner)

Technical information
- Licensing authority: FCC
- Facility ID: 131349
- Class: LD
- ERP: 11.1 kW
- HAAT: 73 m (240 ft)
- Transmitter coordinates: 32°30′7.2″N 92°7′35.4″W

Links
- Public license information: LMS

KWMS-LP (channel 18) was a low-power television station licensed to West Monroe, Louisiana, United States. The station was owned by the Sonrise Communications subsidiary of the First Baptist Church of West Monroe, and was most recently affiliated with the digital multicast network Heroes & Icons. KWMS-LP's studios and transmitter were located on Pine Street in downtown West Monroe.

== History ==
The station was founded in 2001 as an independent station operated by First Baptist Church in West Monroe. Its original call letters were K17FV, but it received the requested KWMS-LP call sign in May 2002. The station's flagship programs were live services from First Baptist Church and sporting events from West Monroe High School. It also aired a local program called Girlfriends produced by On Fire Ministries.

In 2011, KWMS-LP affiliated with RTV, serving as Monroe's affiliate. KWMS-LP affiliated with MeTV on April 1, 2013, replacing RTV. In 2015, KWMS-LP lost MeTV to KMLU and subsequently affiliated with H&I. While sister station KMCT was broadcasting on low power, it temporarily broadcast the Voice Network on channel 18.2 until that station returned to full power. According to the station's official website, it attained cable carriage on every cable system in Ouachita Parish, as well as Bastrop.

On August 6, 2017, KWMS-LP ceased broadcasting operations. The station's license was canceled by the Federal Communications Commission (FCC) on September 4, 2020.
