= KEJB (TV) =

Television station in El Dorado, Arkansas (2003–2010)

- El Dorado, Arkansas; Monroe, Louisiana; United States
- City: El Dorado, Arkansas
- Channels: Digital: 43 (UHF); Virtual: 43
- Branding: My43

Programming
- Affiliations: America One (2003–2004); UPN (2004–2006); MyNetworkTV (2006–2010)

Ownership
- Owner: KM Communications; (KM Television of El Dorado, LLC)

History
- First air date: October 11, 2003
- Last air date: June 4, 2010 (6 years, 236 days)
- Former channel numbers: Analog: 43 (UHF, 2003–2009)

Technical information
- Licensing authority: FCC
- Facility ID: 84164
- ERP: 1,000 kW
- HAAT: 528 m (1,732 ft)
- Transmitter coordinates: 33°4′41.7″N 92°13′31″W

Links
- Public license information: Public file; LMS

KEJB (channel 43) was a television station licensed to El Dorado, Arkansas, United States, which served the Monroe, Louisiana–El Dorado, Arkansas television market. Owned by KM Communications, it was last affiliated with MyNetworkTV. KEJB's transmitter was located near Bolding, Arkansas, on the same tower as NBC affiliate KTVE (channel 10).

== History ==
KEJB originally was slated to launch on October 10, 2003, as a UPN affiliate, but the station had to wait for proper equipment before launching. In the interim, Time Warner Cable, the local cable provider in Ouachita Parish, provided fiber-optic links to the fledgling station to carry UPN's network programming. On February 1, 2004, the station launched full-time with a mixture of UPN, local, and syndicated programming.

KEJB was the market's second UPN affiliate. Cable subscribers received UPN via secondary affiliation on KLAX from the network's launch until KAQY (channel 11) signed on at the end of 1998. The city's first over-the-air affiliate, KMNO-LP, originally broadcast on channel 22 and signed on March 27, 1998. Owned by Louisiana Christian Television (who also owned KMCT), the station was then sold to Great Oaks Broadcasting of Baton Rouge in 2000. KMNO was never carried on local Monroe-area cable systems and eventually went off the air.

Because it was granted an original construction permit after the Federal Communications Commission (FCC) finalized the DTV allotment plan on April 21, 1997, KEJB did not receive a companion channel for a digital television station. Instead, on or before June 12, 2009, which is the end of the digital TV conversion period for full-service stations, KEJB was required to turn off its analog signal and turn on its digital signal (called a "flash-cut"). While a digital signal did go on the air (though it shut down on June 4, 2010, due to equipment failure), the station never filed for either a license to cover or an extension of the construction permit, and it was deleted by the FCC on December 22, 2010.
