= Victory Television Network =

American religious television network

- Central and northeastern Arkansas; United States
- City: KVTN-DT: Pine Bluff, Arkansas; KVTH-DT: Hot Springs, Arkansas; KVTJ-DT: Jonesboro, Arkansas
- Channels: Digital: see § Stations

Programming
- Affiliations: Religious independent

Ownership
- Owner: Victory Television Network, Inc.

History
- First air date: December 1, 1988

Links
- Website: www.vtntv.com

The Victory Television Network (VTN) is a religious independent television network serving the U.S. state of Arkansas. It serves as the broadcasting arm of the Little Rock–based Agape Church, and is operated by a namesake parent subsidiary that holds the licenses for the three stations that comprise the network: flagship station KVTN-DT (channel 25) in Pine Bluff, and satellites KVTH-DT (channel 26) in Hot Springs and KVTJ-DT (channel 48) in Jonesboro. Although all three stations have commercial licenses, VTN—which is the only Christian-oriented television network headquartered in Arkansas and is among the few religious independent stations located outside of a major U.S. television market—operates as a non-profit entity reliant on monetary contributions from its viewers to fund its operations.

In addition to its broadcast stations, VTN's programming is available on more than 225 cable systems across Arkansas. Through their over-the-air, cable and satellite distribution, the VTN stations reach 1.2 million homes across the state of Arkansas, western Tennessee, the bootheel of Missouri, and portions of northwestern Mississippi. The main offices, production facilities and network operations of the Victory Television Network are located at the Agape Church campus on Napa Valley Drive (west of Interstate 430) in western Little Rock.

== History ==
The network was founded by husband-and-wife Howard "Happy" Caldwell II and Jeanne Caldwell, who co-founded the Agape Church in 1979; the Caldwells served as pastors of the church until their semi-retirement in December 2013. In 1987, the Caldwells began developing a television ministry that would utilize the church's production facilities to distribute its weekly services and other ministerial programs, including programs leased to other local ministries, along with acquiring brokered daily and weekly religious programs from non-Arkansas-based ministries that were available in syndication.

On April 28, 1987, KIXK Inc., owned by the El Dorado radio station of the same name, donated the construction permit for KZRQ (channel 25), an unbuilt commercial television station licensed to Pine Bluff, to the Agape Church for $40,611. The transaction was granted by the Federal Communications Commission (FCC) on June 30. The station, which was assigned the call letters KVTN, signed on the air on December 1, 1988, broadcasting from a transmitter near Arkansas Highway 161 in western Jefferson County (located 4.5 miles [7.2 km] west of England).

By the early 1990s, the Caldwells made plans to expand their television ministry—which they branded as the "Victory Television Network"—into other sections of Arkansas. On February 17, 1993, PPD&G, Inc., sold the license assets of KRZB-TV (channel 26) in Hot Springs to the Agape Church for $75,000. KRZB-TV had operated from 1986 to 1988 as an independent station but succumbed to mounting financial problems and a signal that did not reach Little Rock. The sale received FCC approval on November 16, 1993, and was finalized on February 8, 1994. A new $700,000 tower was built on Jack Mountain, 6 miles [9.7 km] south of Hot Springs, to expand channel 26's signal into cities such as Benton and Arkadelphia. Channel 26 returned to the air on April 2, 1995, as KVTN satellite station KVTH.

On October 18, 1994, the Arkansas Rural Television Co. sold the construction permit for an unbuilt commercial station assigned to UHF channel 48 in Jonesboro to the Agape Church for $50,000. The transaction received FCC approval on October 6, 1995, and was finalized on December 11; the station signed on as KVTJ on June 1, 1998, from a transmitter near Judd Hill (approximately 1.1 miles [1.8 km] northwest of the intersection of US 63 and Arkansas Highway 214).

Agape Church also filed permit applications for two additional satellite stations during the mid-1990s, with the intent of expanding the network into portions of Northwest and South-Central Arkansas: the church filed applications to operate satellites on UHF channel 31 in Harrison (on July 28, 1995) and on UHF channel 43 in El Dorado (on June 28, 1996). The Harrison application was dismissed by the FCC on April 3, 1998, while the El Dorado application was dismissed after auction on March 21, 2000. With its broadcast coverage limited to Central and Northeast Arkansas, VTN relies on cable and satellite carriage to distribute its programming to other areas of the state.

On October 14, 2015, the elder Caldwells and their son, Ronnie Caldwell, filed to transfer the VTN stations to Victory Television Network, Inc., a separate licensee operated in conjunction with the Agape Church, for the assumption of monetary operational liabilities. The transfer received FCC approval on December 14. (The network had been overseen by Scott and Loretta Stewart, who became senior pastors at Agape Church in December 2013 as Happy and Jeanne Caldwell transitioned into pastor emeritus roles.)

== Programming ==
Programming on VTN consists primarily of Christian programming syndicated by various national ministries and purchased through time-brokerage agreements, including programs from televangelists such as Joel Osteen (Lakewood Church with Joel Osteen), Jesse Duplantis (Voice of the Covenant), Kenneth Copeland (Believer’s Voice of Victory), Joyce Meyer (Enjoying Everyday Life), James Robison (Life Today), Joseph Prince (Destined to Reign), Marilyn Hickey (Today with Marilyn and Sarah), Andrew Wommack (The Gospel Truth) and Dr. Charles Stanley (In Touch, which airs in both its daily half-hour and weekly one-hour versions); as well as religion-oriented news and talk shows (such as The 700 Club, CBN Newswatch, Christian World News and Your Health with Dr. Richard and Cindy Becker) and gospel music programs (such as the Gaither Homecoming Hour and Great American Gospel).

Along with offering syndicated religious programs, the network also offers original programming (including two programs hosted by VTN founder Happy Caldwell, the flagship interview and biblical teaching program Arkansas Alive and the weekly Happy Caldwell Ministries, and In His Presence, a gospel and biblical teaching program hosted by network co-founder Jeanne Caldwell) and programs produced by other Arkansas-based ministries (such as Words to Empower, hosted by Pastor Frank H. Stewart of North Little Rock–based Agape Community Temple of Servants, which is unrelated to the Agape Church; 2CYR TV, a program profiling stories of youth in Arkansas's foster care and adoption system, hosted by Perry Black of the Bryant-based Second Chance Youth Ranch; and Heart of a Servant, hosted by Apostle Craig and Pastor Sheryl Banks of Pine Bluff–based Canaan Christian Center). Syndicated faith-based children's programs compliant with Children's Television Act guidelines (such as Dr. Wonder's Workshop, Kids Like You and Donkey Ollie) are also broadcast on weekday mid-afternoons in a half-hour block and on Saturday mornings from 6 to 7:30 a.m.

== Stations ==
The Victory Television Network consists of the following full-power digital stations:

Station	City of license	Channels (VC / RF)	First air date	ERP	HAAT	Facility ID	Transmitter coordinates	Public license information
KVTN-DT	Pine Bluff–Little Rock	25; 24 (UHF)	December 1, 1988	725 kW	355.5 m (1,166 ft)	607	34°31′55.7″N 92°2′41.6″W	Public file; LMS
KVTH-DT	Hot Springs	26; 16 (UHF)	April 2, 1995	52.6 kW	263 m (863 ft)	608	34°22′20″N 93°2′49″W	Public file; LMS
KVTJ-DT	Jonesboro	48; 18 (UHF)	June 1998^{1}	420 kW	296 m (971 ft)	2784	35°36′13.16″N 90°31′18.49″W	Public file; LMS

^{1} The Broadcasting and Cable Yearbook says KVTJ signed on June 6, while the Television and Cable Factbook says it signed on June 26.
^{2} KVTN, KVTH and KVTJ incorporated the "-DT" suffix into their respective callsigns on June 22, 2009.

== Technical information ==
=== Subchannel ===
Subchannel	Res.	Short name	Programming
xx.1	1080i	VTN	Main VTN programming

=== Analog-to-digital conversion; spectrum repack ===
KVTN, KVTH and KVTJ shut down their analog signals at 10:00 a.m. on February 9, 2009, eight days before the original federal deadline for American full-power television stations to transition exclusively to digital broadcasts (which Congress had moved the previous month to June 12). The post-transition channel allocations for the Victory Television Network stations are as follows:

- KVTN's digital signal remained on its pre-transition UHF channel 24, which is displayed as virtual channel 25 on digital television receivers.
- KVTH's digital signal relocated from its pre-transition UHF channel 14 to channel 26 for post-transition operations.
- KVTJ's digital signal relocated from its pre-transition UHF channel 49 to channel 48 for post-transition operations.

As a part of the broadcast frequency repacking process following the 2016–17 FCC incentive auction, both of KVTN's satellite stations were required to change their digital channel assignments, which were assigned to the 600 MHz UHF band (corresponding to channels 38–51) that was being reallocated for wireless telecommunications use:

- KVTH's digital signal relocated from its pre-transition UHF channel 26 to channel 16, which is displayed as virtual channel 26 on digital television receivers.
- KVTJ's digital signal relocated from its pre-transition UHF channel 48 to channel 18, which is displayed as virtual channel 48 on digital television receivers.
