= KQRY-CD =

Television station in Springdale, Arkansas

KQRY-CD and KPBI-CD
KQRY-CD: Springdale (Note: Originally licensed to Fort Smith, Arkansas; moved to Springdale in 2026.)–Fayetteville, Arkansas; KPBI-CD: Winslow, Arkansas; United States
- Channels for KQRY-CD: Digital: 34 (UHF); Virtual: 44
- Channels for KPBI-CD: Digital: 31 (UHF); Virtual: 31

Programming
- Affiliations: 44.1/31.1: Estrella TV; for others, see § Subchannels

Ownership
- Owner: Pinnacle Media; (KTV Media, LLC)
- Sister stations: KFFS-CD; KWNL-CD

History
- Founded: KPBI-CD: September 25, 1989
- First air date: KQRY-CD: March 30, 1990
- Former call signs: KQRY-CD: K46BZ (1988–1995); KPBI-LP (1995–2001); KFDF-CA (2001–2013); KFDF-CD (2013–2026); KPBI-CD: K63EG (1989–2000); K09XE (2000–2003); KBBL-CA (2003–2006); KWNL-CA (2006–2011); KWNL-CD (2011–2019)
- Former channel number: KQRY-CD: Analog: 46 (UHF, 1988–2001), 10 (VHF, 2001–2009); Digital: 44 (UHF, 2009–2018), 25 (UHF, 2018–2026)
- Former affiliations: KQRY-CD: Fox (1990−2001); UPN (2001–2006); RTN (2006–2009); Independent (2009–2012); MundoFox/MundoMax (2012–2016); MeTV (2016−2017)

Technical information
- Licensing authority: FCC
- Facility ID: KQRY-CD: 168154; KPBI-CD: 52426
- Class: CD
- ERP: 15 kW
- HAAT: KQRY-CD: 125.7 m (412 ft); KPBI-CD: 114.9 m (377 ft)
- Transmitter coordinates: KQRY-CD: 36°10′48″N 94°5′7″W; KPBI-CD: 36°8′50″N 94°11′14″W

Links
- Public license information: KQRY-CD: Public file; LMS; KPBI-CD: Public file; LMS

KQRY-CD (channel 44) is a low-power, Class A television station licensed to Springdale, Arkansas, United States, serving Northwest Arkansas as an affiliate of the Spanish-language network Estrella TV. It is owned by Pinnacle Media alongside Cozi TV affiliate KFFS-CD (channel 36) and Univision affiliate KWNL-CD (channel 14). KQRY-CD's transmitter is located on Carlock Road east of Springdale.

KPBI-CD (channel 31) in Winslow operates as a translator of KQRY-CD; this station's transmitter is located on South 56th Street in Springdale.

== History ==
The station began as K46BZ when the Federal Communications Commission (FCC) issued an original construction permit to Family Media of Ft. Smith to build a low-power television station on UHF channel 46. In October 1988, Family Media transferred the construction permit to Pharis Broadcasting, who brought the station on the air as a Fox affiliate and obtained its initial license on March 30, 1990.

In the mid-1990s, the FCC began to allow low-power stations to have four-letter callsigns, and in September 1995, the station took the call letters KPBI-LP, for Pharis Broadcasting Inc. In June 1998, claiming displacement, Pharis Broadcasting requested to move the station to VHF channel 10; the FCC granted the request in October 1998. Before finishing the move, Pharis sold KPBI-LP to Equity Broadcasting in a deal finalized in June 2001, along with several other stations. One of those stations was KFDF-LP, at the time operating on channel 32. In September 2001, Equity requested Special Temporary Authority to move KFDF-LP to channel 46, being vacated by KPBI-LP. A month later, Equity switched the two stations' call letters, with the former KPBI moving to channel 10 as UPN affiliate KFDF-CA, and the former KFDF moving to channel 46 as Fox affiliate KPBI-CA.

Under Equity's ownership, KFDF was controlled remotely via satellite from Equity's headquarters in Little Rock, Arkansas, and was relayed in encrypted form via the satellite Galaxy 18 (Ku-band transponder 21). This was true of most of the company's stations.

KFDF-CA lost its UPN affiliation in September 2006, when the network and The WB closed and merged to form The CW Television Network. Equity Broadcasting originally announced that the station would affiliate with MyNetworkTV, instead of joining The CW, which had no over-the-air affiliate in Fort Smith until April 2008, when ABC affiliate KHBS (channel 40) launched a new CW-affiliated second subchannel. However, after KPBI-CA lost its Fox affiliation to then-NBC affiliate KFTA-TV (channel 24), Equity announced that KPBI-CA would join MyNetworkTV, and KFDF-CA would instead join Retro Television Network once UPN went off the air; KPBI was scheduled to join it once WB went off the air but joined MyNetworkTV on September 22, 2006.

On January 4, 2009, a contract conflict between Equity and Luken Communications (who had acquired RTN from Equity in June 2008), interrupted the programming on many RTN affiliates. As a result, Luken restored a national RTN feed from its headquarters in Chattanooga, Tennessee, via SES Americom-owned satellite AMC 9 (83.0°W), with individual feeds to non-Equity-owned affiliates to follow on a piecemeal basis. As a result, KFDF-CA lost its RTN affiliation immediately, though Luken vowed to find a new affiliate for RTN in the area.

After failing to find a buyer at a bankruptcy auction, KFDF was sold to Pinnacle Media in August 2009 (after having initially been included in Silver Point Finance's acquisition on June 2 of several Equity stations), with Pinnacle assuming control under a local marketing agreement on August 5.

On June 19, 2026, KFDF changed its callsign to KQRY-CD.

== Technical information ==
=== Subchannels ===
The station's signal is multiplexed:

Subchannels of KQRY-CD
Subchannel	Res.	Short name	Programming
44.1	720p	KFDF	Estrella TV
44.2	480i	KFDF	Dabl
44.3	480i	KFDF	HSN (4:3)
44.4	480i	KFDF	Newsmax2 (4:3)

Subchannels of KPBI-CD
Subchannel	Res.	Short name	Programming
31.1	720p	Estrela	Estrella TV
31.2	480i	Dabl	Dabl
31.3	480i	Faith	HSN (4:3)
31.4	480i	OAN	One America Plus (4:3)
31.9	480i	JTV	Jewelry TV

=== Analog-to-digital conversion ===
As a low-power station, it is not impacted by the 2009 digital television transition. On September 25, 2013, the station turned off its analog signal.

=== Former translators ===
KKAF-LD 30 (UHF 30) in Fayetteville and KEGW-CD 33 (UHF 33) in Siloam Springs previously rebroadcast KQRY-CD as well, but are now carrying KSJF-CD.
