= KMBS (AM) =

- West Monroe, Louisiana; United States
- Broadcast area: Monroe metropolitan area
- Frequency: 1310 kHz
- Branding: Redden Radio 1310

Programming
- Language: English
- Format: Talk
- Affiliations: Music of Your Life

Ownership
- Owner: Red Bear Broadcasting Corporation

History
- First air date: August 4, 1956
- Last air date: 2026
- Former call signs: KUZN (1956–1984)

Technical information
- Licensing authority: FCC
- Facility ID: 55336
- Class: D
- Power: 5,000 watts (day); 49 watts (night)
- Transmitter coordinates: 32°31′09.5″N 92°3′54.2″W

Links
- Public license information: Public file; LMS

KMBS (1310 kHz, "Redden Radio 1310") was a class D radio station broadcasting a talk format. Licensed to West Monroe, Louisiana, the station served the Monroe metropolitan area, and was owned by Red Bear Broadcasting Corporation.

== History ==
KUZN signed on the air on August 4, 1956. The 1,000-watt, daytime-only station was owned by Howard E. Griffith and broadcast primarily country and gospel music. KUZN moved to new quarters on Parkwood Drive in 1967, when Griffith launched a television station, KUZN-TV channel 39. An expansion into FM radio followed the next year with KUZN-FM 98.3. In the mid-1960s, Gary Burbank worked at KUZN as "Johnny Apollo, the blue-eyed soul brother in the front row".

Griffith, who also was an engineer who had developed a new type of television antenna and who had twice attempted to establish local TV stations, died of a heart attack in February 1976. The next year, KUZN and the FM station (by this point known as KYEA) were sold to Morgan Broadcasting Corporation, owned by Chuck and Kay Morgan, for $305,000. The buyer was intimately familiar with the Griffith stations, as he had worked for KUZN since its 1956 establishment as staff announcer and served as general manager since 1961. Under Charles Morgan, the station became KMBS in 1994, it changed formats several times, including contemporary hit radio, jazz and lastly oldies, which was the format at the time of Chuck Morgan's death and the transfer of KMBS to his widow Kay. The FM station was sold off in 1986.

Kay Morgan sold KMBS in 1993, to Red Bear Broadcasting Company, owned by Chuck Redden. Under Redden, the station aired a variety of oldies and talk formats; it also aired Fox Sports Radio for a time.

The Federal Communications Commission cancelled the station's license on September 3, 2026.
