= KRZB-TV =

Television station in Hot Springs, Arkansas (1986–1988)

Hot Springs, Arkansas; United States
- Channels: Analog: 26 (UHF)

Programming
- Affiliations: Independent

Ownership
- Owner: Bell Equities, Inc.

History
- Founded: September 9, 1982
- First air date: February 7, 1986
- Last air date: March 30, 1988; (2 years, 52 days)

Technical information
- ERP: 244.9 kW
- HAAT: 285 m (936 ft)
- Transmitter coordinates: 34°22′20″N 93°02′47″W

KRZB-TV (channel 26) was an independent television station in Hot Springs, Arkansas, United States, which operated from 1986 to 1988. It closed due to financial mismanagement and awaiting efforts to complete a major facility upgrade that would have increased the station's advertising and viewership base. The dormant license was ultimately purchased and used to build KVTH, the Hot Springs transmitter of the Victory Television Network.

== History ==
On September 9, 1982, Razorback Television Broadcasting, a firm formed by two men from Minden, Louisiana—Herman Drew and Dr. Robert Kemmerly—applied to the Federal Communications Commission (FCC) for a new television station on channel 26 to serve Hot Springs. The FCC granted the application on May 2, 1983, and Drew and Kemmerly announced they would have KRZB-TV on air by January 1985 as a local independent heavy on movies.

Razorback sold channel 26, still unbuilt, in 1985 to PPD&G Corporation of Hot Springs. The new owners announced they would maintain the proposed independent format and slated an early 1986 launch for KRZB-TV. Construction also began on a building on the south side of Hot Springs to house the new station's studios, while a transmitter was built atop Jack Mountain. The site on Corporate Terrace near the Hot Springs Mall, though, attracted some political controversy. The property was owned by Jim Randall, the mayor of Hot Springs, and some raised concerns on whether him leasing the site to the station constituted a conflict of interest.

Channel 26 began broadcasting on February 7, 1986. Local programming included a recap of racing at Oaklawn Park and news inserts, complemented by such syndicated programs as The Merv Griffin Show, The Love Boat, and Barnaby Jones. The station also produced local programs spotlighting Hot Springs's tourist industry and informing visitors.

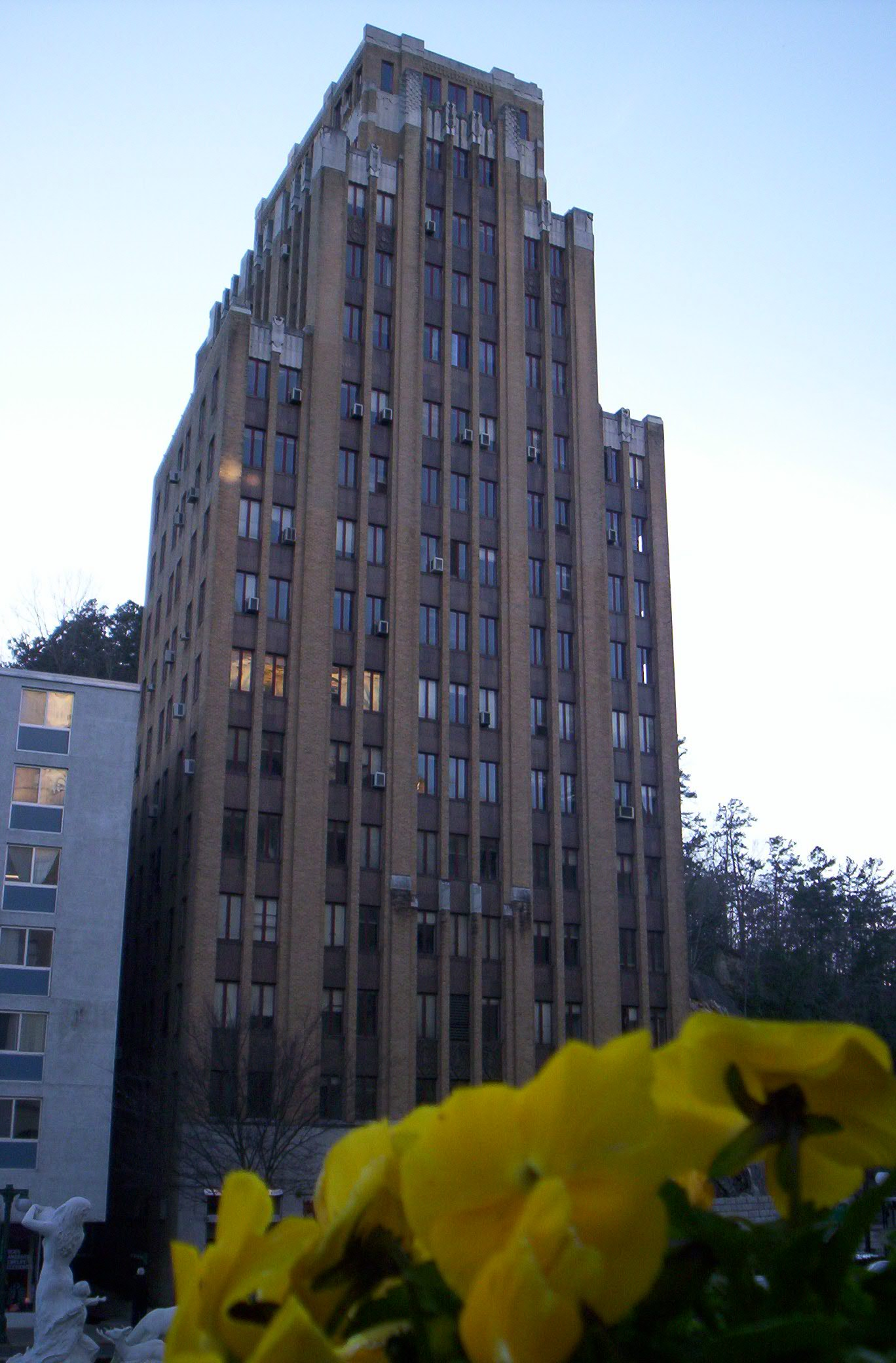
The Medical Arts Building housed KRZB-TV after it was purchased by Bell Equities

In February 1987, rumors began circulating that a majority stake in KRZB-TV was to be sold to Melvyn Bell of Little Rock, whose company Environmental Systems Co. handled hazardous waste disposal of PCBs at an incinerator in El Dorado and who had begun major investments in a variety of fields, from real estate to food service. Don Pittman—who owned that majority stake and was one of the two Ps in PPD&G—had recently lost the city's advertising contract, and one of his companies had filed for bankruptcy. The sale of majority control in channel 26 was announced on March 12, along with a "sweeping" change in programming, including the addition of Texas Rangers and Houston Astros baseball games.

The FCC approved the stock transfer in late May, and the deal was consummated in July. In addition to moving the studios to the Medical Arts Building downtown, which it owned, Bell also made an immediate proposal for a technical upgrade that involved relocating the transmitter to a site on Indian Mountain that was also property of Bell Equities. However, the idea of a 1,056-foot (322 m) mast attracted opposition from the aviation community. The Aircraft Owners and Pilots Association expressed concern that the tower would be in the federal airway between the Hot Springs Municipal Airport and Little Rock, requiring planes to fly at a higher elevation and potentially into clouds in bad weather.

However, it was the station's financial picture that became cloudy. In January 1988, a U.S. district court ordered the station to pay a $91,000 past-due bill to Orbis Communications, a programming supplier, that was incurred under PPD&G management, and a second company had filed for a $15,000 judgment for equipment and services contracted in 1985; Bell appealed the Orbis ruling, contending that the contracts Orbis claimed channel 26 to have breached had never been ratified. On March 29, 1988, Bell announced that KRZB-TV would cease broadcasting the next day for a 120-day period in order to install a new 786-foot (240 m) tower, antenna, and maximum-power antenna at the existing Jack Mountain site; in doing so, it would lay off 20 employees and seek to rehire some of them later. The general manager, Gary Halleland, declared that the effort was "not a close-down but a rebuilding" and noted that new call letters would be adopted when the station resumed operations; he also pointed out that the station needed to put a signal into Little Rock to be financially sustainable.

Once KRZB-TV was off the air, however, more financial problems emerged. The same day channel 26 ceased broadcasting, a Hot Springs company sued for an unpaid $3,750 bill. The owners of the leased studio property filed a $492,000 lawsuit against PPD&G in April 1988, claiming that the owners had failed to timely pay their rent since September 1987. This lawsuit was then settled out of court. Meanwhile, there were no signs of construction at the transmitter site; general manager Halleland left to take the same job at KLAX-TV in Alexandria, Louisiana; and Bell was revealed to owe tens of thousands of dollars in property taxes in his other ventures. Bell had appealed the Orbis ruling, but in a "last resort", the creditor filed writs of garnishment on PPD&G's assets to recover its money; the station remained delinquent after only $11,000 could be garnished from one bank account, resulting in a federal marshal's seizure of a car and a truck that July to satisfy the debt. LeaseAmerica Corporation, which had leased much of the equipment used in operating KRZB-TV, then requested the return of $100,000 in equipment for nonpayment.

The other shoe finally dropped in August when PPD&G, parent company of KRZB-TV, filed for Chapter 11 bankruptcy reorganization. At more than $300,000 owed, LeaseAmerica headlined the list of 118 creditors, alongside a company that had leased the existing Jack Mountain site and a string of program distributors; however, negotiations had been completed for a new facility, also to be located atop Jack Mountain, on land owned by International Paper. Plans were said to be progressing on the technical front into 1989, even as other Bell business ventures began to face scrutiny for failure to pay taxes or meet other financial obligations. By early July—with the station's construction permit slated to expire at the end of the month—KRZB-TV's two remaining employees were laid off pending reopening of the station. This failed to materialize, and after the Chapter 11 petition was closed that November for inability to reorganize due to a failure to attract new investors, PPD&G was sued again by creditors, including sellers of office furniture and business equipment. The FCC granted another time extension on the KRZB-TV construction permit in April 1990, by which time the only evidence of the station's existence, per an article in the Hot Springs Sentinel-Record, was a truck parked near the Medical Arts Building.

In 1992, Darlene Bell acquired all of Melvyn's shares in Bell Equities, and thus its shares in PPD&G, as the result of a divorce settlement. Darlene Bell then sold the station to Agape Church, Inc., then-owners of the Victory Television Network, for $75,000 in 1993. The new owners also filed for a newer and stronger transmitter facility. After the sale closed in February 1994, the call letters were changed to KVTH, and the station returned to the air with VTN programming on April 2, 1995, seven years after KRZB-TV's last broadcast.
