= KMLU =

Television station in Columbia, Louisiana

- Columbia–Monroe, Louisiana; El Dorado, Arkansas; United States
- City: Columbia, Louisiana
- Channels: Digital: 11 (VHF); Virtual: 11
- Branding: MeTV Monroe

Programming
- Affiliations: 11.1: MeTV; for others, see § Subchannels

Ownership
- Owner: Legacy Broadcasting, LLC

History
- Founded: November 25, 1996
- First air date: December 10, 1998
- Former call signs: KAQY (1998–2014)
- Former channel numbers: Analog: 11 (VHF, 1998–2009); Digital: 57 (UHF, until 2009)
- Former affiliations: ABC (1998–2014); Dark (2014–2015)
- Call sign meaning: MLU = IATA airport code for Monroe Regional Airport

Technical information
- Licensing authority: FCC
- Facility ID: 52046
- ERP: 25 kW
- HAAT: 518 m (1,699 ft)
- Transmitter coordinates: 32°11′51″N 92°4′14″W

Links
- Public license information: Public file; LMS

KMLU (channel 11) is a television station licensed to Columbia, Louisiana, United States, serving the Monroe, Louisiana–El Dorado, Arkansas market as an affiliate of MeTV. Owned by Legacy Broadcasting, the station maintains studios and transmitter facilities on KNOE Tower Road off Seay Road near LA 847 north of Columbia.

== History ==
In 1987, the Federal Communications Commission (FCC) allocated VHF channel 11 to Columbia, Louisiana. Initially, several interests in the Monroe and Alexandria areas, including Lanford Telecasting (owner of KALB), Woods Communications (owner of KARD) and Gray Communications (owner of KTVE) sought an interest in the license in order to strengthen its broadcasting footprint in the region, either operating a station on channel 11 as a satellite of an existing station (in KALB or KTVE's case) or as a stronger signal (for KARD). Other companies, such as Love Television Partnership, William L. Cook, Columbia TV and Radio, Pears Broadcasting, Jimmie V. Giles, and Caldwell Broadcasting Limited Partnership all expressed an interest. By late 1995, the license was granted to Monroe Broadcasting, which was owned by businessman Charles Chatelain, who owned Fox affiliate KADN-TV in Lafayette and several other small TV stations in south Louisiana.

KMLU signed on December 10, 1998, as ABC affiliate KAQY, returning that network to the market after its previous affiliate, KARD, became a Fox affiliate in April 1994. The station originally operated from studios located on Sterlington Road in Monroe. After KARD switched to Fox, cable providers began importing KLAX from Alexandria for ABC programming in Monroe proper and KTBS from Shreveport for parts of the western Monroe DMA, with certain programs carried by other stations based in Monroe being replaced due to syndex laws; satellite systems in the area piped in the national feed of the network via its two flagship stations. Monroe Broadcasting owned the station, and Communications Corporation of America managed and operated the station, similar to arrangements Chatelain had with KADN and WNTZ.

On June 23, 2008, original local owner Monroe Broadcasting filed an application with the FCC to sell KAQY to Parker Broadcasting for $10 million. Included in the application was a proposed local marketing agreement (LMA) to allow Hoak Media, then-owner of CBS affiliate KNOE-TV, to operate the station. The sale was completed on October 9, 2008. As a result, all four major network affiliates in the Ark-La-Miss became operated by two companies: Hoak Media and Nexstar Broadcasting Group. During its tenure as a standalone ABC affiliate, even after becoming a sister station to KNOE, the station offered very little local content. It acted largely as a pass-through with ABC programming, airing syndicated programming in the off-hours. It did not air a newscast but carried weather forecasts from Edward St. Pé's WeatherVision service during commercial breaks.

On November 20, 2013, Gray Television announced it would purchase Hoak Media and Parker Broadcasting in a $335 million deal. KAQY was to be acquired by Excalibur Broadcasting, and remain under an LMA with KNOE's new owners. However, upon the closing of the sale on June 13 and the FCC scrutinizing joint sales arrangements, Excalibur would later abandon its plans to acquire the station. Gray would continue to operate KAQY in the interim, at which it would later move its programming to a subchannel of KNOE. KAQY would then be spun off to minority interests pending approval from the FCC, which under this arrangement would allow the station to remain on the air on the condition that it would operate independently and not make any partnerships or sharing arrangements with other broadcasters.

On August 27, 2014, Gray announced that it would sell KAQY's license, along with KHAS-TV in Hastings, Nebraska, KNDX in Bismarck, North Dakota, and KXND in Minot, North Dakota, to Legacy Broadcasting, a new broadcasting company controlled by Sherry Nelson and daughter Sara Jane Ingram. A month later, KAQY signed off, and its programming was moved to KNOE-DT2. On November 28, 2014, the station's call letters were changed to KMLU. The sale was completed on December 15.

Channel 11 remained silent for approximately one year. On September 15, 2015, KMLU returned to the air as the new MeTV affiliate for the Monroe–El Dorado area, taking the affiliation from KWMS-LP, which subsequently affiliated with sister network Heroes & Icons for two years before ceasing operations in 2017. KMLU has also engaged in some community affairs programming recently by broadcasting brief segments during commercial breaks of various events around the Ark-La-Miss. During January 2018, KMLU brought Heroes & Icons programming back to the Ark-La-Miss by launching that network on its second subchannel. It also launched the network Movies! on its third subchannel at the same time.

== Technical information ==
=== Subchannels ===
The station's signal is multiplexed:

Subchannels of KMLU
Channel	Res.	Short name	Programming
11.1	720p	KMLU-HD	MeTV
11.2	720p	H & I	Heroes & Icons
11.3	480i	MOVIES!	Movies!
11.4	480i	START	Start TV
11.5	480i	Shop LC	Shop LC
11.6	480i	GetTV	Great
11.7	480i	Buzzr	Buzzr
11.8	480i	MeToons	MeTV Toons

=== Analog-to-digital conversion ===
KMLU (as KAQY) shut down its analog signal, over VHF channel 11, on February 17, 2009, the original target date on which full-power television stations in the United States were to transition from analog to digital broadcasts under federal mandate (which was later pushed back to June 12, 2009). The station's digital signal relocated from its pre-transition UHF channel 57, which was among the high band UHF channels (52-69) that were removed from broadcasting use as a result of the transition, to its analog-era VHF channel 11.
