= KLRA-CD =

Television station in Little Rock, Arkansas

- Little Rock, Arkansas; United States
- Channels: Digital: 20 (UHF); Virtual: 20
- Branding: Univision Arkansas

Programming
- Affiliations: 20.1: Univision; for others, see § Subchannels

Ownership
- Owner: Larry Morton; (Pinnacle Media, LLC)
- Sister stations: KKYK-CD

History
- Founded: May 15, 1995
- Former call signs: K22FA (1995–1996); KKYK-LP (1996–2005); KKYK-CA (2005–2011); KKYK-CD (2011–2013)
- Former channel numbers: Analog: 22 (UHF, 1995–2006), 20 (UHF, 2006–2009)
- Former affiliations: Network One (1995–1997); The WB (1997–2001); Pax TV (2001–2005); RTN (2005–February 2009); This TV (February–August 2009); Tuff TV (August 2009–2011); MeTV (2011–2013)
- Call sign meaning: Little Rock, Arkansas

Technical information
- Licensing authority: FCC
- Facility ID: 57545
- Class: CD
- ERP: 15 kW
- HAAT: 350.2 m (1,149 ft)
- Transmitter coordinates: 34°47′56″N 92°29′45″W

Links
- Public license information: Public file; LMS
- Website: latinotvar.com

KLRA-CD (channel 20) is a low-power, Class A television station in Little Rock, Arkansas, United States, affiliated with the Spanish-language network Univision. Owned by Pinnacle Media, KLRA-CD maintains studios on Shackelford Drive in the Beverly Hills section of Little Rock (alongside KKYK-CD), and its transmitter is located on Shinall Mountain, near the city's Chenal Valley neighborhood.

== History ==
The station began as K22FA, founded by the locally based Kaleidoscope Affiliates LLC (founded by Larry E. Morton, and renamed Equity Broadcasting Corporation in 1998), which received Federal Communications Commission (FCC) approval for the construction permit on May 15, 1995, and originally signed on as an affiliate of Network One. The station later changed its callsign to KKYK-LP on August 13, 1996; and in January 1997, the station became an affiliate of The WB, allowing Little Rock-area viewers that could receive the signal to watch the network's programs without subscribing to cable or satellite service. (For the first two years of the network's existence, The WB had exclusively been available on Comcast and other cable and satellite providers in the Little Rock market via the superstation feed of Chicago affiliate WGN-TV [later conventional basic cable channel WGN America, now NewsNation].) The station branded itself as "WB22", using a derivative of the logo then used by Denver affiliate KWGN-TV.

The full-power channel 49—for which the construction permit, filed on March 31, 1997, was granted to Equity by the FCC on August 20, 1998—first signed on the air in Camden on June 7, 1999, as KKYK-TV, and KKYK-LP became its repeater. The station has operated from the Shackleford Drive facility—which continue to house the station's operations as KMYA, and at the time had served the master control hub for all of Equity Broadcasting's television stations nationwide—since its sign-on. Supplementing WB prime time and children's programming, KKYK-TV/LP—which, as a WB affiliate, usually branded by its call letters but occasionally identified as "WB 22/49"—carried a blend of first-run syndicated shows, recent and classic off-network sitcoms and drama series, animated and live-action syndicated children's programs, and movies in late-night and on weekends, and by 2000, St. Louis Cardinals Major League Baseball games. Following Equity's purchase of a 49% interest in Arkansas Sports Entertainment in March 2000 (it purchased the remaining 51% in October 2001), channel 49 began televising Arkansas RiverBlades ECHL hockey and Arkansas Twisters AF2 football games (many of which were shown on tape delay after WB and, later, Pax programming), starting with the Twisters' 2000 season and the Riverblades' 2000–01 season respectively.

On January 29, 2001, Equity transferred KKYK's WB network and syndicated programming to Pax TV owned-and-operated station KYPX (channel 42, now MyNetworkTV affiliate KARZ-TV), which the group had purchased from Paxson Communications [now Ion Media] in March 2000, a decision made by the company to provide The WB more substantial over-the-air coverage within the Little Rock–Pine Bluff market. (That station initially changed its callsign to KLRA-TV upon the switch, then to KWBF-TV on August 22.) The former channel 42 intellectual unit—call letters, Pax TV affiliation and local programming—concurrently moved to channel 49, which adopted the KYPX call letters. On June 30, 2005, KYPX and KKYK-LP—which retained the callsign—disaffiliated from Pax TV (as that network was relaunching as i: Independent Television), and became the flagship station of Equity's Retro Television Network classic television service. On June 30, 2006, the station's callsign was modified to KKYK-DT, becoming among the few U.S. television stations to bear the "-DT" suffix. KKYK-LP was re-designated as a Class A station, with its call letters being modified to KKYK-CA (formerly broadcasting on channel 22, KKYK-CA was forced to move to UHF channel 20 to accommodate KATV's digital signal).

On January 4, 2009, the station lost access to Retro Television Network programming amid a dispute over a service contract between Equity and Luken Communications (which had acquired RTN in June 2008, and moved RTN's operations to its headquarters in Chattanooga, Tennessee) that expired that morning without renewal, resulting in Luken terminating the network's agreements with KKYK and the rest of its Equity-owned affiliates; (RTN—under its new modified initialism, RTV—later affiliated with KATV, being carried on that station's second digital subchannel.)

The station became an affiliate of This TV on February 1, 2009, lasting five months until August 1, when it switched to Tuff TV. (This TV would later resurface on the DT2 subchannel of Fox affiliate KLRT-TV [channel 16] in July 2012, lasting until the subchannel was dropped after Nexstar Broadcasting Group partner company Mission Broadcasting took over operations in February 2013.) On April 10, 2009, Equity announced a fire sale of its television stations; KKYK had been set an asking price of $15 million, the highest price for any of the stations being auctioned. In the auction, which took place on April 16, KKYK-DT and KKYK-CA were sold alongside Equity's four other Little Rock stations for $1.15 million to the Bank of Little Rock, which acquired the station through the subsidiary Hallmark National Mortgage Corporation. The sale received FCC approval on December 13, 2009, and was approved on January 7, 2010. On August 2, 2010, it was announced that KKYK-CA would sell to Pinnacle Media for $250,000. On January 3, 2011, KKYK-CA began broadcasting digitally as KKYK-CD.

On February 28, 2013, KKYK-CD swapped call letters with KLRA-CD (channel 30), taking over the Univision affiliation of the former KLRA.

== Subchannels ==
The station's signal is multiplexed:

Subchannels of KLRA-CD
Subchannel	Res.	Short name	Programming
20.1	1080i	KLRA-CD	Univision
20.2	480i	Faith	
20.3	480i	Spirit	Spirit TV
20.4	480i	Silver	SilverSpur TV
20.5	480i	JTV	Jewelry TV
20.6	480i	HSN	HSN
20.7	480i	RVTV	Quinnly TV
20.8	480i	HLand	Heartland
20.9	480i	cstone	Infomercials (4:3)
20.10	480i	NewsMa2	Newsmax2
