= KNOE-TV =

Television station in Monroe, Louisiana

- Monroe, Louisiana; El Dorado, Arkansas; United States
- City: Monroe, Louisiana
- Channels: Digital: 8 (VHF); Virtual: 8
- Branding: KNOE 8 First Alert News; ABC KAQY First Alert News (8.2)

Programming
- Affiliations: 8.1: CBS; 8.2: ABC; for others, see § Subchannels

Ownership
- Owner: Gray Media; (Gray Television Licensee, LLC)
- Sister stations: KALB-TV

History
- First air date: September 27, 1953
- Former channel numbers: Analog: 8 (VHF, 1953–2009); Digital: 7 (VHF, until 2009)
- Former affiliations: All secondary: DuMont (1953–1955); ABC (1953–1972); NBC (1953–1974)
- Call sign meaning: Founder James A. Noe

Technical information
- Licensing authority: FCC
- Facility ID: 48975
- ERP: 22.3 kW
- HAAT: 576 m (1,890 ft)
- Transmitter coordinates: 32°11′51″N 92°4′14″W
- Translator(s): K20OC-D El Dorado, AR

Links
- Public license information: Public file; LMS
- Website: www.knoe.com

KNOE-TV (channel 8) is a television station licensed to Monroe, Louisiana, United States, serving the Monroe, Louisiana–El Dorado, Arkansas market as an affiliate of CBS and ABC. It is owned by Gray Media alongside low-power station KCWL-LD (channel 40, also licensed to Monroe). KNOE-TV's studios are located on Oliver Road north of Louisville Avenue in Monroe, and its transmitter is located north of Columbia off Seay Road near LA 847.

The station also operates a low-power translator, K20OC-D in El Dorado, which rebroadcasts KNOE-TV's digital signal in high definition. Even though the translator broadcasts on UHF channel 20, it remaps to virtual channel 8.

== History ==
KNOE-TV went on the air on September 27, 1953. Initially, the station had a 774-foot (236 m) tower, weighing 4 tons and costing $65,000. At the time, it was the most powerful tower in the American South. KNOE-TV is the oldest surviving station in the northern part of Louisiana. Its sign-on forced its only competitor, KFAZ (channel 43), off the air in the summer of 1954. James A. Noe Sr., former governor of Louisiana, owned the television station as well as KNOE (1390 AM).

The station has been affiliated with all four television networks of the "golden age": CBS, NBC, ABC and DuMont. During the late 1950s, KNOE-TV was also briefly affiliated with the NTA Film Network. In the 1960s, KNOE broadcast a mix of programs from ABC and CBS. In 1969, KNOE installed a translator station on channel 18, K18AB, atop the First National Bank Building in El Dorado to better serve viewers in that area. KNOE-TV continued to air ABC programming until 1972 when KTVE became a primary ABC affiliate and NBC programming until 1974 when KLAA signed on. During its early years through the 1990s, KNOE, along with Lafayette station KLFY, served the Alexandria and Central Louisiana market as the CBS affiliate on record, as cable outlets in the area largely carried both stations prior to current sister station KALB launching a CBS subchannel in 2007.

Noe died in 1976, and passed the station to his son, James "Jimmie" Noe Jr. The Noes continued to own the station until 2007, when it was sold to Dallas-based Hoak Media. The sale closed on October 3 of that year. The family had already sold KNOE (540 AM) to Holladay Broadcasting in November 2006, and would sell KNOE-FM 101.9 to them the following year. The sale of the stations followed Jimmie Noe's death from cancer in 2005, in which it was decided by the family to leave the broadcasting business. On August 25, 2010, KNOE-TV started broadcasting syndicated programming in high definition.

On November 20, 2013, Gray Television announced it would purchase Hoak Media in a $335 million deal. This deal brought Gray back into the Monroe–El Dorado market as Gray had owned KTVE from 1967 until 1996. The deal also included the acquisition of Parker Broadcasting, owner of ABC affiliate KAQY, which KNOE-TV had operated under a local marketing agreement since 2008. However, due to recent scrutiny by the FCC regarding LMAs (KAQY was originally to be sold to the shell company Excalibur Broadcasting, and would have maintained its LMA with Gray), KAQY was sold to a minority-owned company, and KNOE-TV would forgo any operational agreements with the new owner. In September 2014, KAQY signed off, and its programming was moved to KNOE-TV's second digital subchannel, displacing The CW Plus to the third.

Gray picked up MyNetworkTV in late 2017 for KNOE's third subchannel; the block airs from 1:30 to 3:30 a.m., replacing default paid programming aired as part of the national CW Plus schedule. It is the market's third station to carry MyNetworkTV programming since KEJB ceased operations in 2010 and KMCT-TV dropped the network in 2016 in order to carry only religious programming. Despite the CW affiliation moving to a subchannel of KARD (the former KLAA), the MyNetworkTV feed continues to air on KNOE/KCWL.

On December 30, 2023, KNOE-TV parent company Gray Television announced it had reached an agreement with the New Orleans Pelicans to air 10 games on the station during the 2023–24 season. On September 17, 2024, Gray and the Pelicans announced a broader deal to form the Gulf Coast Sports & Entertainment Network, which would broadcast nearly all 2024–25 Pelicans games on Gray's stations in the Gulf South, including KNOE-TV.

== News operation ==
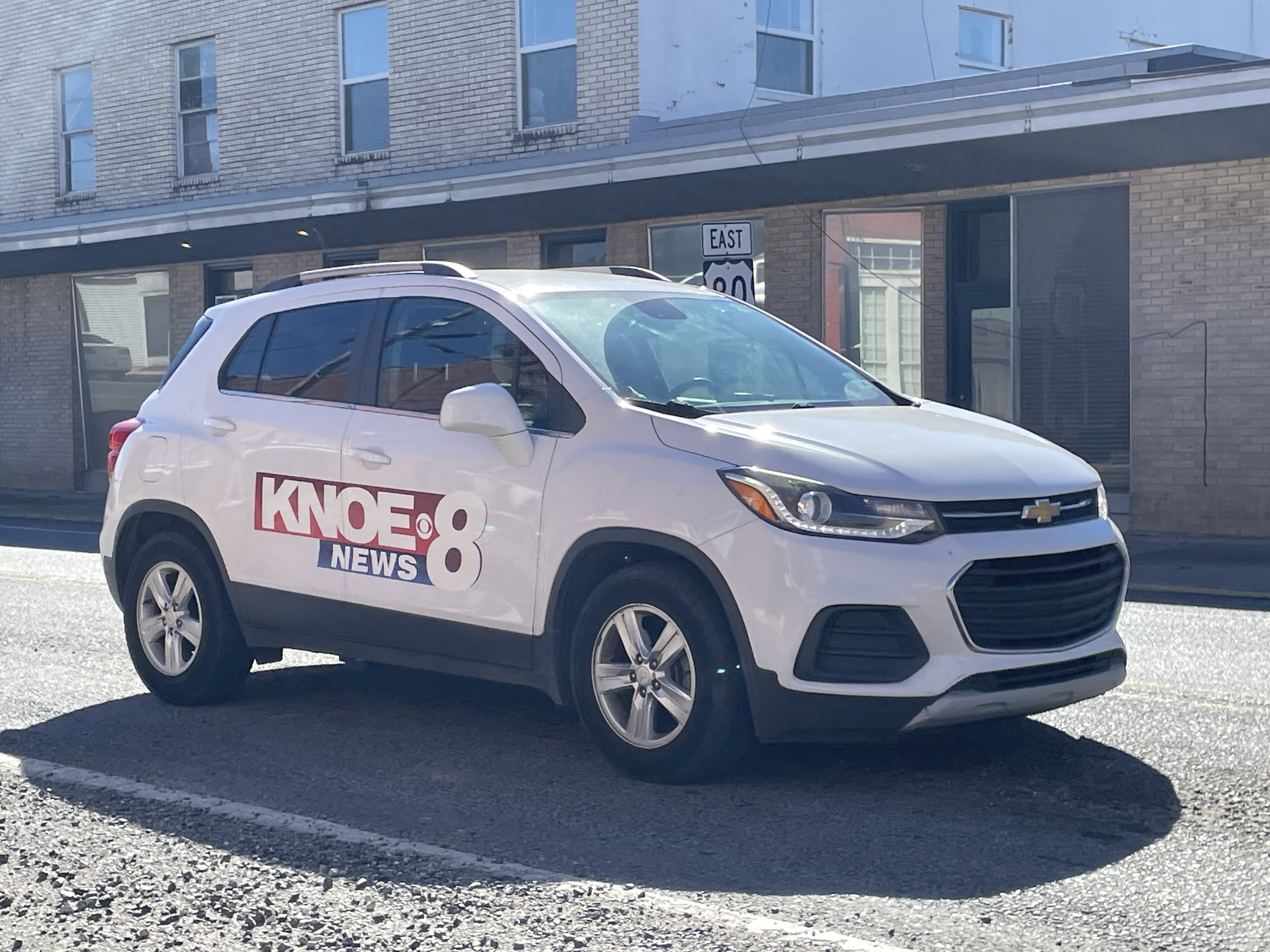
KNOE 8 News Car in Tallulah, Louisiana.

KNOE-TV has been the dominant news station in the Ark-La-Miss for more than a quarter-century. It has won numerous state, regional and national journalism awards, including the 2008 Alfred I. duPont-Columbia University Award for News Director Taylor Henry's investigative series on rogue members of the Louisiana National Guard who looted stores they were deployed to protect during Katrina.

On weekdays, KNOE-TV airs a two-hour morning newscast called Good Morning Ark-La-Miss (the last half hour is simulcast on KNOE-DT2), as well as half-hour newscasts at noon, 5 p.m., 6 p.m., and 10 p.m. On weekends, the station airs two half-hour newscasts at 6 p.m. on Saturdays and 5:30 p.m. on Sundays and 10 p.m. both days. Newscasts are typically branded as KNOE 8 News and have been since 2008.

On November 1, 2010, KNOE-TV debuted a new news set, fit for high definition broadcast. On January 17, 2011, KNOE-TV began broadcasting local newscasts and field reports in high definition, becoming the first station in the Ark-La-Miss region to do so.

Beginning in September 2016, KAQY began broadcasting two unique newscasts using staff from KNOE-TV. Airing weeknights at 5:30 and 10 p.m. (the latter against KNOE-TV), KAQY News Now features short segments/news capsules in a rapid fire progression.

== National prominence ==
"Good Night and Good Duck", the second episode of Season 7 of the A&E series Duck Dynasty, was shot mostly at the KNOE-TV studios, and aired nationally November 26, 2014. The episode had all mention of KNOE-TV's CBS and ABC affiliations obscured on-set for copyright reasons, through virtual or physical means.

== Technical information ==
=== Subchannels ===
KNOE-TV's signal is multiplexed:

Subchannels of KNOE-TV
Subchannel	Res.	Short name	Programming
8.1	1080i	KNOE-HD	CBS
8.2	720p	KAQY-HD	ABC
8.3	480i	GCSEN	Gulf Coast SEN (primary) / MyNetworkTV (secondary)
8.4	480i	THE 365	365BLK
8.5	480i	Justice	True Crime Network
8.6	480i	Quest	Quest
8.7	480i	Bounce	Bounce TV

Subchannel of KCWL-LD
Subchannel	Res.	Short name	Programming
40.1	720p	KCWL-LD	Gulf Coast SEN (primary) / MyNetworkTV (secondary)

Simulcast of subchannels of another station

=== Analog-to-digital conversion ===
KNOE-TV shut down its analog signal, over VHF channel 8, on February 17, 2009, the original target date on which full-power television stations in the United States were to transition from analog to digital broadcasts under federal mandate (which was later pushed back to June 12, 2009). The station's digital signal relocated from its pre-transition VHF channel 7 to channel 8.

=== Translators ===
In addition to the main signal, KNOE-TV operates two translators. A simulcast of their main signal exists over K20OC-D (channel 20), formerly K18AB-D (channel 18) in El Dorado. Another translator, KCWL-LD (channel 40, formerly K40MB-D) in Monroe, is used to simulcast KNOE-DT3 into 720p high definition.

City of license	Callsign	Channel	ERP	HAAT	Facility ID	Transmitter coordinates
El Dorado	K20OC-D	20	9.2 kW	52 m (171 ft)	48977	33°12′42″N 92°39′50.3″W
Monroe	KCWL-LD	24	15 kW	171 m (561 ft)	184070	32°31′40″N 92°06′08.7″W
