= Dabl =

American digital multicast TV network

- Type: Digital multicast television network (Black sitcoms)
- Country: United States
- Broadcast area: 79.91% OTA coverage and streaming
- Affiliates: List of Dabl affiliates
- Headquarters: New York City, New York

Programming
- Picture format: 720p (HDTV); 480i (SDTV, widescreen); (downgraded to 4:3 on some over-the-air affiliates)

Ownership
- Owner: Skydance (operated by Weigel Broadcasting)
- Parent: DABL Network LLC (CBS News and Stations)
- Key people: Steve LoCascio (COO/CFO, CBS Global Distribution Group)
- Sister channels: List: MeTV MeTV+ MeTV Toons Movies! Heroes & Icons Catchy Comedy Start TV Story Television WEST See List of assets owned by Skydance Corporation

History
- Founded: June 27, 2019; 7 years ago
- Launched: September 9, 2019; 7 years ago

Links
- Website: dabltvnetwork.com

Availability

Terrestrial
- See list of affiliates

Streaming media
- Service(s): Frndly TV, FuboTV, Hulu with Live TV, Philo, YouTube TV

Dabl (/ˈdæbəl/) is an American digital multicast television network owned by the CBS News and Stations subsidiary of Skydance and operated by Weigel Broadcasting.

Dabl launched in September 2019 with a female-targeted lifestyle format. It aired reruns of cooking shows, home renovation shows, Undercover Boss, and more (see full list below under 'former programming').

In December 2023, Paramount transferred management duties to Weigel. The network switched to airing Black sitcoms (sourced mainly from the Paramount library at first, plus other companies later including now sibling company Warner Bros. Entertainment) from the mid-1990s through the early to mid-2010s.

== History ==
=== 2019–2023: Lifestyle channel ===
On June 17, 2019, CBS Television Distribution (now CBS Media Ventures) announced the launch of Dabl as a lifestyle-oriented digital subchannel network targeting a female audience. The network would be carried on CBS's owned-and-operated stations (which covered 39% of American television households), and, at the time of the announcement, had reached non-casual and subchannel-leasing affiliation agreements that would extend its reach over 70% nationwide. To add to CBS's library of daytime talk, court and informational programming, CBS acquired the rights to programs from Martha Stewart and Emeril Lagasse's content libraries to help round out Dabl's schedule. Prior to the network's launch, CBS had been slow to offer additional subchannels on its O&Os since the 2009 digital transition.

The launch of Dabl followed CBS's rollouts of the ad-supported streaming channels CBS Sports HQ and ET Live (which were initially made available on co-owned, ad-supported, non-pay service Pluto TV). Entertainment website Deadline noted that Dabl's launch came at a "boom time" for multicast networks, which could be operated by broadcasters at low cost utilizing library content with "sizeable ratings" from various distributors.

Dabl launched on September 9, 2019, at 8:00 a.m. Eastern Time, with an expected national coverage rate of 80% as of August 27. The network was the first CBS-owned property that had its operations built and operated using cloud computing and transmitted through CBS's media operations platform, which utilizes both automation and cloud-enabled technology.

=== 2023–present: African-American sitcom channel ===
On December 29, 2023, at 6:00 a.m. Eastern Time, with small advanced promotion (outside of programming data provided to TV listings providers), Dabl was relaunched as an entertainment network aimed at African-American audiences, featuring an initial schedule of Paramount-distributed African-American sitcoms from the 1990s and 2000s in repeating 12-hour blocks (episodes of each show are replayed from 6:00 p.m. to 6:00 a.m. ET at airtimes matching their initial daytime broadcasts). Most of the programs (including four of the seven relaunch lineup shows, Girlfriends, One on One, Half & Half, Moesha and its spinoff The Parkers) originally aired on the now-defunct UPN, whose original slot included programming for African-American audiences as competitor broadcast networks (such as The WB) began pulling back on developing series aimed at the demographic starting in the late 1990s.

Concurrent with the relaunch, Paramount—which retains ownership and distribution rights to the network, along with supplying programming—transferred management responsibilities for Dabl to Weigel Broadcasting which had previously partnered with CBS for the vintage television multicast network Decades (now Catchy Comedy), which they jointly owned from its launch in 2014 until Weigel became the network's sole owner in March 2023. It also became exclusive to digital broadcast TV, with its free ad-supported streaming television distribution withdrawn in line with Weigel's near-exclusive distribution philosophy over broadcast television for their networks.

== Programming ==
=== Current ===
==== Current programming ====
- Are We There Yet? (October 1, 2024 – present)
- Everybody Hates Chris (May 6, 2024 – present)
- The Game (December 29, 2023 – present)
- Girlfriends (December 29, 2023 – present)
- Half & Half (December 29, 2023 – present)
- Hot Bench (January 27, 2025 – August 14, 2026; September 14, 2026 – present)
- The Jamie Foxx Show (May 6, 2024 – present)
- Judge Judy (April 21, 2025 – August 14, 2026; September 14, 2026 – present)
- Living Single (May 6, 2024 – present)
- Martin (October 6, 2025 – present)
- Moesha (December 29, 2023 – present)
- One on One (December 29, 2023 – present)
- The Parkers (December 29, 2023 – present)
- Sister, Sister (December 29, 2023 – present)
- The Wayans Bros. (May 6 – September 30, 2024; October 6, 2025 – present)

==== Educational programming ====
- Note: All programming is produced and distributed by Hearst Media Production Group.
- Best Friends Furever with Kel Mitchell (January 5, 2025 – present)
- Harlem Globetrotters: Play it Forward (January 5, 2025 – present)
- Oh Baby! with Anji Corley (January 5, 2025 – present)
- Wild Child (January 5, 2025 – present)

=== Former ===
- 60 Minute Makeover
- Animal Rescue (E/I)
- Biz Kids (E/I)
- Cesar 911
- Cesar Millan's Leader of the Pack
- Culinary Genius
- Dabl at Home
- Design Inc.
- Dirty Business
- Disaster Decks
- Dog Tales (E/I)
- The Drew Barrymore Show
- Emeril Live
- Escape to the Country
- Essence of Emeril
- Extreme Makeover: Home Edition
- Find & Design
- Flip This House
- Flipping Boston
- Flipping San Diego
- From Martha's Garden
- Gordon Ramsay's Home Cooking
- Gordon Ramsay's Ultimate Cookery Course
- Home Again with Bob Vila
- Hotel Hell
- House Doctor
- How Clean Is Your House?
- Ice Cold Cash
- Instant Gardener
- Jamie's 15-Minute Meals
- Jamie's 30-Minute Meals
- Jamie's Food Escapes
- Kitchen Nightmares
- Martha Stewart Living
- Missing: Open Files (E/I)
- Nanny 911
- Pick a Puppy
- Real Potential
- Reno vs. Relocate
- Rich Bride Poor Bride
- Room Service
- Sarah 101
- Sell This House
- Selling Houses with Amanda Lamb
- Undercover Boss
- Wild Stories at the San Diego Zoo (E/I)
- Wild Times at the San Diego Zoo (E/I)
- You Deserve This House
- You Gotta Eat Here!
- Yum

== Affiliates ==
Outside the CBS News and Stations (owned and operated), the network is offered to affiliates on a case-by-case basis, one of revenue-sharing, a license fee or leasing. Dabl's partner stations include stations from the station groups of CBS News and Stations, Bahakel Communications, Capitol Broadcasting Company, Graham Media Group, News-Press & Gazette Company, Gray Media, Sinclair Broadcast Group, Nexstar Media Group and Latin-owned TelevisaUnivision. It was previously carried by the CBS app, Pluto TV and Paramount+ until its diverse, December 2023 relaunch.
