= Larry E. Morton =

Larry E. Morton was one of the founders of the defunct Equity Broadcasting Corporation, established in 1998 and liquidated in 2009. Prior to forming Equity Broadcasting Corporation, Morton was the president/manager of Las Vegas Media, LLC and Kaleidoscope Affiliates, LLC (1994–1998).

Morton was CEO and president of Coconut Palm Acquisition Corp., a venture capital firm, as well as a major stockholder in Acxiom Corporation. His annual compensation from Equity was reported to have been US$390,000 plus options on two million shares of Equity Media Holdings.

Morton is a graduate of the United States Air Force Academy with a Bachelor of Science degree in economics and is a certified public accountant and licensed real estate broker. He also graduated from the University of Arkansas at Little Rock with a Bachelor of Science degree in accounting and a master's degree in business administration.

== Equity Broadcasting ==
Under his leadership, Equity Broadcasting operated 24 full-power stations, 37 Class A stations and 67 low-power stations. Morton created EBC's C.A.S.H. System, a central automated satellite hub which replaced local station master control and programmed all of the Equity Media Holdings stations remotely from the company's Little Rock, Arkansas headquarters, and co-developed RTN, the Retro Television Network.

On February 11, 2008, Larry E. Morton was replaced by Henry Luken as president and CEO of Equity Media but remained as chairman, president and CEO of Retro Programming Services, Inc., a wholly owned subsidiary of EMHC which operated RTN. Equity Media Holdings sold the Retro Television Network to Luken Communications in June 2008, cancelled local newscasts on its stations and attempted to sell various assets, ultimately filing for Chapter 11 bankruptcy protection in December 2008.

On Jan 4, 2009, all Equity-owned or -operated stations lost their affiliations with RTN due to a business dispute involving unpaid obligations to programming suppliers.

Equity was liquidated in 2009 under the control of a chief restructuring officer appointed by creditor Silver Point Finance. Most of its individual television stations have been sold with any remaining Equity stations now permanently off-air, their FCC licences revoked after going dark beyond one year.
