= KFFS-CD =

Television station in Fort Smith, Arkansas

KFFS-CD and KFDF-LD
KFFS-CD: Fayetteville, Arkansas; KFDF-LD: Lowell–Fort Smith, Arkansas; United States
- Channels for KFFS-CD: Digital: 36 (UHF); Virtual: 36
- Channels for KFDF-LD: Digital: 5 (VHF), to move to 34 (UHF); Virtual: 36

Programming
- Affiliations: 36.1: Cozi TV; for others, see § Subchannels

Ownership
- Owner: Pinnacle Media, LLC; (KTV Media, LLC)
- Sister stations: KWNL-CD; KQRY-CD

History
- First air date: KFFS-CD: December 8, 1994; KFDF-LD: September 14, 1995
- Former call signs: KFFS-CD: K36EA (1994–2001); KFFS-CA (2001–2013); KFDF-LD: K43EZ (1995–2004); KXUN-LP (2004–2013); KXUN-LD (2013–2019); KQRY-LD (2019–2026)
- Former channel number: KFFS-CD: Analog: 36 (UHF, 1996–2013); KFDF-LD: Analog: 43 (UHF, 1996–2013); Digital: 43 (UHF, 2013–2019)

Technical information
- Licensing authority: FCC
- Facility ID: KFFS-CD: 52430; KFDF-LD: 14386
- Class: KFFS-CD: CD; KFDF-LD: LD
- ERP: KFFS-CD: 15 kW; KFDF-LD: 3 kW
- HAAT: KFFS-CD: 114.9 m (377 ft); KFDF-LD: 247.9 m (813 ft)
- Transmitter coordinates: KFFS-CD: 36°8′50″N 94°11′14″W; KFDF-LD: 35°47′49″N 94°10′5″W
- Translators: KUFS-LD (19 UHF, Fort Smith; K20OL-D (20 UHF, Fort Smith); K22OC-D (22 UHF, Fort Smith)

Links
- Public license information: KFFS-CD: Public file; LMS; KFDF-LD: Public file; LMS

KFFS-CD (channel 36) is a low-power, Class A television station in Fayetteville, Arkansas, United States, affiliated with the digital multicast network Cozi TV. It is owned by Pinnacle Media alongside Bentonville–licensed Univision affiliate KWNL-CD (channel 14). The two stations share studios on North College Avenue in Fayetteville; KFFS-CD's transmitter is located on South 56th Street in Springdale.

KFDF-LD (channel 36) in Lowell is a translator of KFFS-CD, serving the Fort Smith area; this station's transmitter is located near Winslow, Arkansas.

== KFDF-LD history ==
At one point, KQRY-LP (as Univision affiliate KXUN-LP) aired local newscasts; they were produced out of Little Rock, Arkansas, with reports produced in Fort Smith. The newscasts were canceled in June 2008, after then-owner Equity Media Holdings instituted a companywide suspension of news programs.

After failing to find a buyer at a bankruptcy auction, KXUN was sold to Pinnacle Media in August 2009 (after having initially been included in Silver Point Finance's acquisition on June 2 of several Equity stations), with Pinnacle assuming control under a local marketing agreement on August 5.

KXUN was previously seen on KPBI's digital subchannel 34.2; after KPBI was sold to Local TV LLC and renamed KXNW, the KXUN simulcast was replaced with a simulcast of new sister station KFSM-TV. On February 5, 2019, KXUN-LD swapped call signs with KQRY-LD in Sallisaw, Oklahoma. On June 19, 2026, it swapped call signs again, this time with KFDF-CD in Springdale.

== Subchannels ==
The station's signal is multiplexed:

Subchannels of KFFS-CD and KFDF-LD
Channel	Res.	Short name	Programming
36.1	480i	KFFS-CD	Cozi TV
36.2	480i	Nost	MovieSphere Gold
36.3	480i	Spirit	Spirit TV
36.4	480i	NTD	SilverSpur TV
36.5	480i	NM2	Newsmax2
36.6	480i	Binge	Binge TV
36.7	480i	RVTV	RVTV
36.8	480i	Lapod	Quinnly TV
36.9	480i	Cstone	Cornerstone TV (4:3)
