= KTVE =

Television station in El Dorado, Arkansas

- El Dorado, Arkansas; Monroe, Louisiana; United States
- City: El Dorado, Arkansas
- Channels: Digital: 27 (UHF); Virtual: 10
- Branding: KTVE NBC 10; NBC 10 News

Programming
- Affiliations: 10.1: NBC; for others, see § Subchannels

Ownership
- Owner: Mission Broadcasting, Inc.
- Operator: Nexstar Media Group via LMA
- Sister stations: KARD

History
- First air date: December 3, 1955
- Former call signs: KRBB (1955–1958)
- Former channel numbers: Analog: 10 (VHF, 1955–2009)
- Former affiliations: NBC (1955–1972); ABC (secondary 1955–1972; primary 1972–1981)
- Call sign meaning: Television El Dorado

Technical information
- Licensing authority: FCC
- Facility ID: 35692
- ERP: 822.8 kW
- HAAT: 582 m (1,909 ft)
- Transmitter coordinates: 33°4′41.6″N 92°13′30.9″W

Links
- Public license information: Public file; LMS
- Website: www.myarklamiss.com

KTVE (channel 10) is a television station licensed to El Dorado, Arkansas, United States, serving as the NBC affiliate for the Monroe, Louisiana–El Dorado, Arkansas market. It is owned by Mission Broadcasting and operated by Nexstar Media Group alongside Fox affiliate KARD (channel 14). The two stations share studios on Pavilion Road in West Monroe; KTVE's transmitter is located northwest of Huttig, Arkansas.

KTVE's signal can be seen in 18 counties and parishes in Arkansas and Louisiana. On certain occasions, the signal can be seen as far north as Hot Springs, Arkansas, as far east as Jackson, Mississippi, and as far west as Texarkana, Texas. For many years, it was known as "Region 10", because when the station moved primary operations from El Dorado to Monroe, it kept a full news, advertising sales, and production staff in El Dorado. For a number of years, the 5 p.m. newscast was broadcast from the El Dorado studio, while all other newscasts came from the new Monroe studio.

== History ==
The station debuted on December 3, 1955, as KRBB. It was founded and owned by three men—Dr. Joe F. Rushton, W. C. Blewster, and William M. Bigley (hence the KRBB call letters)—under the company name South Arkansas TV Company. In 1957, Representative Oren Harris owned the station for one year with Rushston, Blewstar, and Bigley. On November 7, 1958, upon erecting a larger transmitter to better cover the Monroe–El Dorado area, it changed its call letters to KTVE. In 1960, the station was sold to Veterans Broadcasting Company, who owned then-NBC affiliate WROC-TV in Rochester, New York. It began broadcasting in color in 1961 and was purchased by J. B. Fuqua in 1963. It was a primary NBC affiliate, sharing ABC with KNOE-TV. Fuqua sold KTVE to Gray Communications in December 1967, making it Gray's third owned station. In February 1970, shortly after rival station KNOE installed a translator in El Dorado to better serve viewers there, KTVE installed a translator south of Monroe, W02AW.

On August 1, 1972, KTVE, along with then sister-station WJHG-TV in Panama City, Florida, switched its primary affiliation to ABC, leaving NBC programming largely absent from the Monroe area until future sister station KLAA (now KARD) signed on in 1974, save select programming broadcast on the station and KNOE. For many years, the station had two news studios—one in Monroe and one in El Dorado. However, KTVE closed its Monroe studios on Catalpa Street in 1978.

On December 6, 1981, KTVE rejoined NBC while KLAA became an ABC affiliate (that station changed its call letters to KARD one year later), clearing the entire network schedule except for two local daytime programs and Saturday Night Live. The first program the station aired as a full-time NBC affiliate was an NFL game between the New England Patriots and Miami Dolphins. Originally, the station wanted to retain ABC as a secondary affiliation, but contractual issues prevented this; the switch, which also involved WJHG, took place because Gray believed NBC performed better in the ratings in small and mid-sized markets.

In 1983, Gray moved KTVE's main studio to Kilpatrick Boulevard in Monroe and began branding the station as "Region 10"; it retained a satellite studio in El Dorado with only a few staff members, including a video journalist. This led to many complaints from Arkansas viewers that KTVE only featured stories from the Louisiana side of the market. In the late 1990s, the Federal Communications Commission (FCC) forced KTVE to adopt a split-anchor format as a condition of renewing its license. During the weekday morning and weekday 5 p.m. newscasts, one anchor was stationed in Monroe, while another was stationed in El Dorado. This condition is no longer enforced by the FCC, although KTVE does still report news from El Dorado. In 1996, Piedmont Television acquired KTVE from Gray Communications (Gray would later return to the Monroe–El Dorado market in 2014 when it purchased rival station KNOE from Hoak Media).

KTVE originally aired Louisiana Lottery numbers during the station's 10 p.m. newscast until KNOE complained to the FCC in 1997. Due to a technicality in FCC rules, KTVE could not air the lottery numbers since it was licensed in Arkansas, which had no lottery at the time; this would change in 2009 when the Arkansas Scholarship Lottery began operations.

In 2002, KTVE took over the operations of KARD (then owned by Quorum Broadcasting) through a local marketing agreement. Although KTVE is the senior partner, operations were consolidated at KARD's studio in West Monroe; the two stations also share a website. KTVE also operated translator station W02AW on channel 2. The transmitter was located south of Monroe, Louisiana. This translator was decommissioned when KTVE increased its tower height.

On January 16, 2008, Piedmont Television completed the sale of KTVE to Mission Broadcasting. On the same day, Nexstar Broadcasting Group (who acquired KARD as part of its purchase of Quorum Broadcasting in 2003) took over control of KTVE under a local sales agreement, like all of Mission's stations. As a result of the change, Nexstar now controls four of the seven NBC affiliates serving Arkansas. Memphis-based WMC-TV and Jonesboro's KAIT-DT2, which cover northeast Arkansas, and Springfield, Missouri's KYTV, which serves north-central Arkansas, are owned by Gray Television (the former Gray Communications).

== News operation ==
Former El Dorado Mayor Mike Dumas served the station as news writer and later as the main evening anchor, before he was elected Union County Judge and later Mayor.

In 2006, KTVE was named the winner of the Radio-Television News Directors Association's Ultimate News Makeover contest. The station received about $300,000 in free design, consultation, manufacturing, production and coaching. On the same day that the station revealed its new set, it dropped the longstanding "Region 10" brand in favor of "NBC10". This news set and graphics package remained in use until the station began broadcasting its local news in HD in 2012.

In early 2012, KTVE began airing its newscasts in high definition (studio cameras are not HD; only field cameras are). When this occurred, the station upgraded its set and graphics and changed its news theme from Stephen Arnold's "The Rock" to "Evolution". In June 2012, sister station KTAL in Shreveport made the same move.

On April 2, 2012, KTVE debuted a half-hour midday newscast titled Arkansas Today, airing weekdays at noon; produced by Little Rock sister station KARK-TV (anchor Mallory Hardin and meteorologist/co-host Greg Dee also appear on KARK's weekday morning newscast) and broadcast in high definition, the statewide newscast also features news stories filed by reporters from all four Nexstar-owned NBC stations serving Arkansas as well as a sports segment produced by Fayetteville sister station KNWA-TV, focusing on University of Arkansas athletics, called Razorback Nation. KTVE also provides a weather insert for southern Arkansas during the broadcast. In addition to airing on KTVE, KNWA and KARK, the program is also simulcast on KTAL-TV in Shreveport–Texarkana (the coverage areas of KTVE and KTAL include several counties in southern Arkansas [fourteen in KTVE's viewing area, ten in KTAL's], though both stations primarily serve parts of northern Louisiana).

In 2022, KTVE expanded its early-evening local news coverage by adding a weekday 4 p.m. newscast that broadcasts in El Dorado and covers South Arkansas.

== Technical information ==
=== Subchannels ===
The station's signal is multiplexed:

Subchannels of KTVE
Subchannel	Res.	Short name	Programming
10.1	1080i	KTVE-HD	NBC
10.2	1080i	KARD-HD	Fox (KARD)
10.3	480i	Laff	Laff
10.4	480i	Escape	Ion Mystery

Simulcast of subchannels of another station

On January 3, 2007, KTVE-DT signed on with a full-power digital signal with an ERP of 822 kW. KTVE-DT then started broadcasting the network feed of NBC in high definition on January 12, 2007.

In March 2009, KARD and KTVE informed the FCC that they needed to end analog operations sooner than June 12 (the earliest they could do so is April 16). KARD stated that a transmitter tube failed, bringing power down to 50%; KTVE claimed that its power was at 40%. Used parts were deemed unreliable, and staffers had to travel 50 miles (80 km) to the transmitter from the studio; two to three visits per week were required to monitor the analog facilities, according to Nexstar. The FCC denied the request based on the fact that they were the last two analog channels in the market. Since launching its digital signal, KTVE aired a standard definition simulcast of KARD to serve areas of North Louisiana and Southern Arkansas that cannot receive the latter station's signal. In 2020, KTVE upgraded KARD's simulcast to high definition, airing it in 1080i.

=== Analog-to-digital conversion ===
KTVE shut down its analog signal, over VHF channel 10, on April 16, 2009. The station's digital signal remained on its pre-transition UHF channel 27, using virtual channel 10.
