= KWNL-CD =

Television station in Bentonville, Arkansas

KWNL-CD and KXUN-LD

KWNL-CD: Bentonville–Fayetteville, Arkansas; KXUN-LD: Fort Smith, Arkansas (Note: Originally licensed to Sallisaw, Oklahoma; moved to Fort Smith in 2021.); United States
- Channels for KWNL-CD: Digital: 32 (UHF); Virtual: 14
- Channels for KXUN-LD: Digital: 26 (UHF); Virtual: 48
- Branding: Univision Arkansas

Programming
- Affiliations: 14.1/48.1: Univision

Ownership
- Owner: Pinnacle Media, LLC
- Sister stations: KFFS-CD; KQRY-CD

History
- First air date: KWNL-CD: 1993; KXUN-LD: June 28, 1995
- Former call signs: KWNL-CD: K58DE (1993–1994); K14IT (1994–2004); KHMF-CA (2004–2017); KHMF-CD (2017–2018); KPBI-CD (2018–2019); KXUN-LD: K48FL (1995–2012); K48FL-D (2012–2018); KQRY-LD (2018–2019)
- Former channel number: KWNL-CD: Analog: 58 (UHF, 1993–1994), 14 (UHF, 1994–2017); Virtual: 9 (PSIP, 2011–2013); KXUN-LD: Analog: 48 (UHF, 1995–2009); Digital: 48 (UHF, ????–201?)

Technical information
- Licensing authority: FCC
- Facility ID: KWNL-CD: 52426; KXUN-LD: 14387
- Class: KWNL-CD: CD; KXUN-LD: LD
- ERP: KWNL-CD: 15 kW; KXUN-LD: 15 kW
- HAAT: KWNL-CD: 117.9 m (387 ft); KXUN-LD: 160.6 m (527 ft)
- Transmitter coordinates: KWNL-CD: 36°08′50″N 94°11′14″W; KXUN-LD: 35°26′51.3″N 94°21′54.8″W

Links
- Public license information: KWNL-CD: Public file; LMS; KXUN-LD: Public file; LMS
- Website: latinotvar.com

KWNL-CD (channel 14) is a low-power, Class A television station in Bentonville, Arkansas, United States, affiliated with the Spanish-language network Univision. It is owned by Pinnacle Media alongside Fayetteville–licensed Cozi TV affiliate KFFS-CD (channel 36) and Springdale–licensed Estrella TV affiliate KQRY-CD (channel 44). KWNL-CD's transmitter is located on South 56th Street in Springdale, Arkansas.

KXUN-LD (channel 48) in Fort Smith operates as a translator of KWNL-CD; this station's transmitter is located on Pernot Road in Van Buren.

== History ==
The call letters were changed from KBBL-CA to KWNL-CA on July 6, 2006. On July 14, 2006, the KBBL-CA call letters reappeared on Channel 56 in Springfield, Missouri.

At one point, KWNL aired local newscasts; they were produced out of Little Rock, Arkansas, with reports produced in Fort Smith. The newscasts were canceled in June 2008, after then-owner Equity Media Holdings instituted a company wide suspension of news programs.

After failing to find a buyer at a bankruptcy auction, KWNL was sold to Pinnacle Media in August 2009 (after having initially been included in Silver Point Finance's acquisition on June 2 of several Equity stations), with Pinnacle assuming control under a local marketing agreement (LMA) on August 5.

== Technical information ==
=== Subchannels ===
The stations' signals are multiplexed:

Subchannel of KWNL-CD and KXUN-LD
| Subchannel | | Res. | Short name | Programming |
| KWNL-CD | KXUN-LD | Res. | Short name | Programming |
|---|---|---|---|---|
| 14.1 | 48.1 | 1080i | KWNL-CD | Univision |
