= 2006 United States broadcast television realignment =

Events around the launches of The CW and MyNetworkTV

- Date: January 24, 2006 – September 18, 2006 (7 months and 25 days)
- Location: United States
- Caused by: Financial issues and low ratings for The WB and UPN since they began operations in January 1995; Sale of Chris-Craft UPN stations to Fox in 2001; Viacom split into CBS Corporation and new Viacom in December 2005
- Goals: Merge the programming schedules of The WB and UPN into The CW
- Result: The CW announces affiliation agreements with WB affiliates owned by Tribune and CBS-owned UPN stations; Tribune divests ownership stake in The WB; Fox announces the creation of MyNetworkTV to compensate for its UPN affiliates not being included; Fox-owned UPN stations disaffiliate from UPN on August 31; MyNetworkTV launches on September 4; The CW launches on September 18; The CW is sold to Nexstar Media Group in 2022

Parties
Time Warner	CBS Corporation	News Corporation

Lead figures
Dick Parsons (CEO); Jeff Bewkes (network president); Jamie Kellner (minority owner)	Les Moonves (chairman)	Rupert Murdoch (chairman)

United Paramount Network (UPN)

The WB Television Network

The CW Television Network

MyNetworkTV

In January 2006, the United States' two "second-tier" television networks, UPN and The WB, announced they would both cease operations on September 15 and September 17 respectively, and their operations would be transferred to a new joint-venture "fifth" network, The CW. Meanwhile, Fox Television Stations (which owned several UPN affiliated stations in large cities that were blocked from affiliating with The CW) signed up with MyNetworkTV, a new "sixth" network owned by then-parent company News Corporation's Fox Entertainment Group.

== Background ==
In January 1995, The WB Television Network and the United Paramount Network (UPN) were launched, each hoping to recreate the success of the Fox network, which had launched in October 1986 and became one of America's "major" networks through the successes of several early series (such as The Simpsons, Married... with Children, The X-Files, Melrose Place, Martin, In Living Color, COPS, Beverly Hills, 90210, and Fox Kids' airings of the Mighty Morphin Power Rangers) and its 1993 deal with the National Football League (NFL) to assume the broadcast rights to the National Football Conference (NFC) from CBS. Like with Fox at the time, The WB targeted a mostly teenage and young adult audience; UPN, however, aimed its programming at a broader demographic of adults between 18 and 49 years of age.

Like Fox (then owned by 20th Century Fox's parent company at the time, News Corporation), the two networks had been joint ventures between major Hollywood studios and large owners of previously independent stations: The WB was owned by the Warner Bros. Entertainment division of Time Warner, in a joint venture with the Tribune Company, and UPN was founded by Chris-Craft Industries, in a programming partnership with Paramount Pictures. In October 1993, Chris-Craft and the Paramount Stations Group reached affiliation agreements with most of the independents owned by the respective groups to serve as charter UPN affiliates. That November, Tribune cut affiliation deals with The WB for all eight independents it owned at the time (including stations in New York City, Los Angeles and Chicago) – as well as a station in Boston that Tribune bought from the Gannett Company the following year, though only seven would join the network at launch due to the company's Atlanta station affiliating with CBS (its New Orleans station would follow suit in 1996, switching its affiliation to ABC); Chris-Craft and Paramount also each owned independents in large and mid-sized markets (with the former owning stations in New York City and Los Angeles).

Both new networks launched to limited fanfare and generally poor results. Over the course of 11½ seasons, despite a number of minor-hit or cult-hit series such as Star Trek: Voyager, Star Trek: Enterprise, Charmed, 7th Heaven, Gilmore Girls, Girlfriends, Buffy the Vampire Slayer, Felicity, Moesha, Dawson's Creek, The Parkers, One on One, Roswell, and Kids' WB's airing of the anime Pokémon, neither network was able to attain the stature that Fox had gained in its first decade, much less that of the longstanding "Big Three" television networks (ABC, CBS and NBC). By early 2006, both networks were losing money, although The WB had been profitable a few seasons earlier; in slight contrast, UPN had never turned a profit and had already lost $800 million in its first five years of operation. Reports indicated that the prospects for both networks were fading quickly.

A further complication was the various shifts in network and affiliate ownership at UPN. Shortly before its launch, Paramount Pictures' corporate parent Paramount Communications was purchased by Viacom, which later purchased a 50% stake in UPN in December 1996, and acquired CBS in 2000. Viacom was permitted to keep interests in both networks, in effect, resulting in the Federal Communications Commission (FCC) lifting its long-standing ban on television station duopolies. Chris-Craft's relations with Viacom were strained in February 2000 when the latter firm exercised a contractual right to force Chris-Craft to either buy Viacom out of UPN, or sell its stake in the network to Viacom within a 45-day grace period. Chris-Craft subsequently filed a lawsuit against Viacom in the New York Supreme Court to block the CBS merger on grounds that a pact reached between Chris-Craft and Viacom in 1997 disallowed either company from owning "any interest, financial or otherwise" in "any competing network" through January 2001; however, New York Supreme Court judge Herman Cahn ruled against Chris-Craft's move for a permanent injunction motion in March 2000. Chris-Craft could not find a suitable partner and sold its interest in UPN to Viacom for $5 million that April. This had the adverse effect of making UPN one of the few networks not to have owned-and-operated flagship stations in New York City and Los Angeles.

Similarly, The WB had the distinction of being the only American broadcast network never to have had an O&O, as although minority owner Tribune operated its core charter stations, Time Warner held majority ownership in the network (with a maximum interest of 77.5%, during the final years of The WB's existence). Time Warner did acquire Atlanta independent WTBS (which served as the originating feed of then-superstation TBS) through its 1996 merger with the Turner Broadcasting System; however, WATL (which Tribune would acquire in 1999) served as the WB affiliate for that market throughout the network's run.

That August, when Chris-Craft put its television stations – most of them UPN affiliates – up for sale, it sold them to News Corporation's Fox Television Stations subsidiary instead of Viacom. At the time, Fox seemed to be a willing partner in UPN, but made no firm commitment. On September 24, 2003, Fox Television Stations renewed affiliation agreements for its nine UPN stations for three years through 2006. On December 31, 2005, Viacom split into two companies: a new company keeping the Viacom name (which took the original company's film and most of its cable television properties), and CBS Corporation (essentially the old Viacom renamed, which retained the broadcast properties, along with Showtime Networks). In this "split", ownership of UPN went to CBS Corporation.

== The new "fifth" and "sixth" networks ==
On January 24, 2006, CBS Corporation and Time Warner announced they would shut down both UPN and The WB that fall. In place of these two networks, a new "fifth" network that would be jointly owned by both companies, would launch, with a lineup made primarily of the most popular programs from both The WB and UPN. The network was given the name "The CW Television Network" ("CW" representing the first letters in "CBS" and "Warner Bros.").

The CW immediately announced ten-year affiliation agreements with 16 WB affiliates owned by Tribune Broadcasting, and 11 UPN owned-and-operated stations under CBS ownership, giving the new network coverage in all of the top 13 markets and a reach of 48% of the country. The remaining affiliates were to be drawn from the pool of stations affiliated with UPN and The WB. The CW took on The WB's base scheduling model (two hours of prime time programming each Monday through Friday and five hours on Sundays, a two-hour daytime block on weekdays and a five-hour Saturday morning children's block), which was larger in scope compared to UPN, which aired prime time programming only on weekdays and a two-hour repeat block on weekends at the time of the CW announcement.

It was immediately clear that most media markets which had stations that were owned by Tribune would receive the CW affiliation, leaving Fox Television Stations, UPN's second largest affiliate group (after the UPN O&Os owned by CBS Television Stations), without any network programming during primetime hours. Rumors began to circulate that Fox would develop its own network for those affected stations and others left out in the merger. The rumors proved true, and on February 22, 2006, Fox announced the launch of its own network, MyNetworkTV, a programming service meant to fill the two nightly primetime hours that would open up on its UPN and WB-affiliated stations after the start of The CW. Fox also offered the service to independent stations.

== Stations ==
Following the CW network announcement, the new network immediately announced ten-year affiliation agreements with the Tribune Company and CBS Television Stations. Tribune committed 16 stations – including its flagship broadcast stations WGN-TV in Chicago; KTLA in Los Angeles; and WPIX in New York City – that were previously affiliated with The WB, while CBS committed 11 of its UPN stations – including WPSG in Philadelphia; KBCW in San Francisco; and WUPA in Atlanta. These stations combined to reach 48 percent of the United States. Both groups also owned several UPN- and WB-affiliated stations that did not join The CW in overlapping markets. As part of its agreement, Tribune agreed to divest its 22.5% ownership interest in The WB – a decision that the company made in part to avoid shouldering shutdown costs for the network – and did not acquire an interest in The CW.

The CW and MyNetworkTV would eventually reach 95% of all television households in the United States. In markets where both UPN and WB affiliates operated, only one station became a CW affiliate or a MyNetworkTV affiliate. CW executives were on record as preferring the "strongest" stations viewership-wise among The WB and UPN's existing affiliates. However, as the reorganization was structured not as a merger in the legal sense, but as a new network launching concurrent with the shutdowns of The WB and UPN, The CW was not obligated by existing affiliations with The WB and UPN. It had to negotiate affiliation agreements from scratch with individual stations.

As a result, in some markets, the new CW affiliate or MyNetworkTV affiliate was a different station from either the former WB and UPN stations. In Helena, Montana, Ion Television affiliate KMTF became a CW station. In Las Vegas, Nevada, independent KFBT chose to affiliate with The CW. In Honolulu, Hawaii, The CW did not become available in the market until early December 2006, where it was carried on a digital subchannel of local Fox affiliate KHON-TV. The network also affiliated with some digital channels, mainly newly launched subchannels of a local Big Four affiliate, in several markets.

Under the new network, a new service called The CW Plus began serving Nielsen markets with rankings of 100 and lower, featuring a pre-supplied master schedule of programs acquired from the syndication market in addition to CW network programming. The CW Plus is structured similarly to The WB 100+ Station Group, which supplied locally branded WB-affiliated cable channels. In most cases, distribution for The CW Plus covers not only cable but broadcast television as well, including the digital subchannels discussed above.

On March 1, 2006, five stations – four WB affiliates and one UPN affiliate – were the first outside the core CBS and Tribune stations to sign affiliation deals with The CW. By May 18, 2006, 174 stations had signed agreements to become affiliates of The CW and MyNetworkTV, reaching 105 million households and covering 95.3% of the country (the latter two figures excluding stations in Puerto Rico and the U.S. Virgin Islands).

Station groups that signed up a large number of their stations as CW affiliates included Pappas Telecasting Companies, ACME Communications and Sinclair Broadcast Group, although many other large groups, including Hearst-Argyle Television, Clear Channel Communications and Belo Corporation had signed up selected stations. Sinclair signed deals to carry the networks in early May, despite reservations with The CW and MyNetworkTV reporting demands for reverse compensation.

While WGN-TV in Chicago became a charter affiliate of The CW, its former national counterpart WGN America never aired programs from The CW through a formal affiliation when it operated as WGN-TV's out-of-market superstation feed prior to December 2014 (although it did carry reruns of select CW series in marathon form in 2013), as the network has enough affiliate coverage that The CW did not need to use the national WGN feed to carry its programming; WGN America had previously carried WB programming from that network's January 1995 launch until October 1999, when Tribune Broadcasting and Time Warner mutually decided that The WB's national broadcast coverage had increased to a level that allowed the WGN national feed to discontinue carrying the network.

Several affiliates changed their call letters to reflect their new CW and MyNetworkTV affiliations; e.g., KPWB-TV in Des Moines became KCWI, WNPA-TV in Pittsburgh became WPCW, WJWB in Jacksonville became WCWJ, WHCP in Portsmouth, Ohio became WQCW, WEWB in Albany, New York became WCWN, KWCV in Wichita, Kansas became KSCW, WBDC in Washington, D.C. became WDCW, KBHK in San Francisco became KBCW, KHWB in Houston became KHCW. Some stations retained call signs that referred to UPN and The WB, such as WUPA in Atlanta and KWBA-TV in Tucson, Arizona, respectively. Between February and August 2006, News Corporation's MyNetworkTV stations and CBS Corporation's CW stations dropped all references to UPN and The WB from their branding.

Due to the availability of "instant duopoly" digital subchannels, and the overall lack of a need to settle for a secondary affiliation with shows aired in problematic timeslots, both The CW and MyNetworkTV launched with far greater national coverage than that enjoyed by UPN and The WB when they started in 1995. For several years, UPN had coverage gaps in the top 30 markets, and by 2005 had only managed to reach 86 percent of the population. This resulted in secondary affiliations with other networks (with some dual WB-UPN affiliates airing the latter network's programming immediately after The WB's primetime lineup, and vice versa) and diluted ratings when programs were shown out of their intended timeslots, or the lack of the program airing at all (a problem experienced by many Star Trek fans with Star Trek: Voyager and Star Trek: Enterprise).

Stations involved in the realignment by market
Market	Station	Affiliation before switch	Affiliation after switch	Current affiliation
Abilene–Sweetwater	KTXS-DT2	—N/a	The CW	
Abilene–Sweetwater	KXVA-DT2	UPN	MyNetworkTV	
Aguadilla–San Juan	WSJP-LD	UPN / The WB	The CW	Fox
Albany, GA	WSWG-DT2	—N/a	MyNetworkTV	MeTV
Albany, GA	WSWG-DT3	—N/a	The CW	MyNetworkTV
Albany–Schenectady–Troy	WEWB-TV	The WB	The CW	
Albany–Schenectady–Troy	WNYA	UPN	MyNetworkTV	
Albuquerque–Santa Fe	KWBQ	The WB	The CW	
Albuquerque–Santa Fe	KRWB	The WB	The CW	
Albuquerque–Santa Fe	KASY-TV	UPN	MyNetworkTV	
Alexandria	KBCA	The WB	The CW	Heroes & Icons
Alexandria	WNTZ-TV	Fox	Fox / MyNetworkTV	
Alexandria	KALB-DT3	—N/a	The CW	
Amarillo	KVII-DT2	The WB	The CW	
Amarillo	KVIH-DT2	The WB	The CW	
Amarillo	KCPN-LP	UPN	MyNetworkTV	
Anchorage	KYES-TV	UPN	MyNetworkTV	CBS
Anchorage	KIMO-DT2	—N/a	The CW	
Atlanta	WATL	The WB	MyNetworkTV	
Atlanta	WUPA	UPN	The CW	CBS
Augusta, GA	WRDW-DT2	UPN	NBC	
Augusta, GA	WRDW-DT3	—N/a	MyNetworkTV	
Augusta, GA	WAGT-DT2	—N/a	The CW	Defunct
Austin, TX	K13VC	UPN	Independent	Defunct
Austin, TX	KBVO	NBC	NBC	MyNetworkTV
Austin, TX	KNVA	The WB	The CW / MyNetworkTV	The CW
Bakersfield	KGET-DT2	The WB	The CW	
Bakersfield	KUVI-TV	UPN	MyNetworkTV	Quest
Baltimore	WUTB	UPN	MyNetworkTV	TBD
Baltimore	WNUV	The WB	The CW	
Bangor	WABI-DT2	—N/a	The CW	
Bangor	WVII-DT2	Fox	Fox / MyNetworkTV	
Bangor	WFVX-LD	Fox	Fox / MyNetworkTV	
Baton Rouge	WAFB-DT4	UPN	MyNetworkTV	
Baton Rouge	WBRL-CD	The WB	The CW	
Baton Rouge	WBXH-CD	UPN	MyNetworkTV	
Baton Rouge	WGMB-DT2	The WB	The CW	
Beaumont–Port Arthur	KFDM	CBS / UPN	CBS	
Beaumont–Port Arthur	KFDM-DT2	The WB	The CW	
Beaumont–Port Arthur	KUMY-LP	Independent	MyNetworkTV	NewsNet
Bend, OR	KTVZ-DT2	—N/a	The CW	
Bend, OR	KUBN-LP	UPN	MyNetworkTV	
Billings	KTVQ-DT2	—N/a	The CW	
Biloxi–Gulfport	WXXV-DT2	UPN	MyNetworkTV	NBC
Binghamton	WBNG-DT2	The WB	The CW	
Birmingham–Anniston–Tuscaloosa	WDBB	The WB	The CW	
Birmingham–Anniston–Tuscaloosa	WTTO	The WB	The CW	
Birmingham–Anniston–Tuscaloosa	WABM	UPN	MyNetworkTV	
Bluefield–Beckley–Oak Hill	WVVA-DT2	The WB	The CW	
Bluefield–Beckley–Oak Hill	WVNS-DT2	UPN	MyNetworkTV	
Boise	KNIN-TV	The WB	The CW	Fox
Boston	WSBK-TV	UPN	Independent	
Boston	WZMY-TV	Independent	MyNetworkTV	True Crime Network
Boston	WLVI	The WB	The CW	
Bowling Green	WBKO-DT3	The WB	The CW	
Buffalo	WNLO	UPN	The CW	
Buffalo	WNYO-TV	The WB	MyNetworkTV	
Butte–Bozeman	KXLF-DT2	—N/a	The CW	
Casper–Riverton	K26ES	UPN / i	The CW	MyNetworkTV / MeTV
Cedar Rapids–Waterloo–Iowa City–Dubuque	KWKB	The WB	The CW / MyNetworkTV	TCT
Champaign–Springfield–Decatur	WCIA-DT2	UPN	MyNetworkTV	
Champaign–Springfield–Decatur	WBUI	The WB	The CW	
Champaign–Springfield–Decatur	WCIX	UPN	MyNetworkTV	
Charleston–Huntington	WSAZ-DT2	—N/a	MyNetworkTV	
Charleston–Huntington	WHCP	The WB / UPN	The CW	
Charleston, SC	WCBD-DT2	—N/a	The CW	
Charleston, SC	WMMP	UPN	MyNetworkTV	
Charlotte	WJZY	UPN	The CW	Fox
Charlotte	WWWB	The WB	MyNetworkTV	The CW
Charlottesville	WAHU-CA2	—N/a	MyNetworkTV	WeatherNation TV
Charlottesville	WVIR-DT3	—N/a	The CW	
Chattanooga	WDEF-TV	CBS / UPN	CBS	
Chattanooga	WFLI	The WB	The CW	
Cheyenne–Scottsbluff	K26ES	UPN / i	The CW	MyNetworkTV / MeTV
Chicago	WGN-TV	The WB	The CW	
Chicago	WPWR-TV	UPN	MyNetworkTV	
Chico–Redding	KHSL-DT2	The WB	The CW	
Chico–Redding	KZVU-LD	UPN	MyNetworkTV	
Chico–Redding	KRVU-LD	UPN	MyNetworkTV	
Cincinnati	WKRC-DT	—N/a	The CW	
Cincinnati	WBQC-CA	UPN	Independent	Telemundo
Cincinnati	WSTR-TV	The WB	MyNetworkTV	
Clarksburg–Weston	WVFX-DT2	The WB	The CW	
Cleveland–Akron	WUAB	UPN	MyNetworkTV	
Cleveland–Akron	WBNX-TV	The WB	The CW	
Colorado Springs–Pueblo	KKTV-DT2	—N/a	MyNetworkTV	
Colorado Springs–Pueblo	KXTU-LP	UPN	The CW	
Columbia–Jefferson City	KOMU-DT3	The WB	The CW	
Columbia–Jefferson City	KMIZ-DT3	—N/a	MyNetworkTV	
Columbia, SC	WZRB	UPN	The CW	Ion
Columbia, SC	WKTC	The WB	MyNetworkTV	
Columbus–Tupelo–West Point–Houston	WCBI-DT2	UPN	MyNetworkTV	
Columbus–Tupelo–West Point–Houston	WCBI-DT3	—N/a	The CW	
Columbus, GA	WXTX	Fox	Fox / MyNetworkTV	Fox
Columbus, GA	WLGA	UPN	The CW	Lx
Columbus, OH	WSYX-DT2	—N/a	MyNetworkTV	MyNetworkTV / This TV
Columbus, OH	WWHO	UPN / The WB	The CW	
Corpus Christi	KRIS-DT2	—N/a	The CW	
Corpus Christi	KTOV-LP	UPN	MyNetworkTV	Defunct
Dallas–Fort Worth	KTXA	UPN	Independent	
Dallas–Fort Worth	KDFI	Independent	MyNetworkTV	
Dallas–Fort Worth	KDAF	The WB	The CW	
Davenport–Rock Island–Moline	WQAD-DT3	UPN	MyNetworkTV	
Davenport–Rock Island–Moline	KGWB-TV	The WB	The CW	
Dayton	WBDT	The WB	The CW	
Dayton	WRGT-DT2	—N/a	MyNetworkTV	
Denver	KWGN-TV	The WB	The CW	
Denver	KTVD	UPN	MyNetworkTV	
Des Moines–Ames	KDMI	—N/a	America One / MyNetworkTV	TCT
Des Moines–Ames	KPWB-TV	The WB	The CW / MyNetworkTV	The CW
Detroit	WDWB	The WB	MyNetworkTV	Independent
Detroit	WKBD	UPN	The CW	
Dothan	WTVY-DT2	UPN	MyNetworkTV	
Dothan	WTVY-DT3	—N/a	The CW	
Duluth–Superior	KDLH-DT2	The WB	The CW	True Crime Network
Duluth–Superior	KBJR-DT2	UPN	MyNetworkTV	CBS
El Paso	KDBC-DT2	—N/a	MyNetworkTV	
El Paso	KVIA-DT2	—N/a	The CW	
Elmira	WENY-DT3	The WB	The CW	
Elmira	WJKP-LP	—N/a	MyNetworkTV	
Elmira	WYDC-DT2	—N/a	MyNetworkTV	
Erie	WSEE-DT2	—N/a	The CW	
Eugene	KMTR-DT2	The WB	The CW	
Eugene	KUCW-DT2	The WB	The CW	
Eugene	KEVU-CD	Independent	MyNetworkTV	
Eugene	KLSR-DT2	Independent	MyNetworkTV	
Eugene	KMTX-DT2	The WB	The CW	
Eureka	KECA-LD	UPN	The CW	
Eureka	KECA-LD2	UPN	MyNetworkTV	
Evansville	WJPS-LP	The WB	The CW	Defunct
Evansville	WIKY-LP	The WB	The CW	Defunct
Evansville	WAZE-LP	The WB	The CW	Defunct
Evansville	WEVV-DT2	Fox	Fox / MyNetworkTV	
Evansville	WEEV-LD	Fox	Fox / MyNetworkTV	
Evansville	WTSN-LP	UPN	MyNetworkTV	Telemundo
Fairbanks	KATN-DT2	The WB	The CW	Fox
Fargo	KCPM	UPN	MyNetworkTV	Defunct
Flint–Saginaw–Bay City	WNEM-DT2	—N/a	MyNetworkTV	
Flint–Saginaw–Bay City	WEYI-DT2	The WB	The CW	
Flint–Saginaw–Bay City	WBSF	The WB	The CW	
Fort Myers–Naples	WTVK	The WB	The CW	
Fort Smith–Fayetteville–Springdale–Rogers	KFSM-DT2	The WB	MyNetworkTV	True Crime Network
Fort Smith–Fayetteville–Springdale–Rogers	KWFT	The WB	RTN	MyNetworkTV
Fort Smith–Fayetteville–Springdale–Rogers	KPBI-CA	Independent	MyNetworkTV	Defunct
Fort Wayne	WPTA-DT2	The WB	The CW	NBC
Fort Wayne	WISE-DT2	—N/a	MyNetworkTV	True Crime Network
Fresno–Visalia	KAIL	UPN	MyNetworkTV	TCT
Fresno–Visalia	KFRE	The WB	The CW	
Gainesville	WMYG-LP	UPN / The WB	MyNetworkTV	Defunct
Gainesville	WGFL-DT2	UPN / The WB	MyNetworkTV	
Grand Junction–Montrose	KREX-DT3	—N/a	MyNetworkTV	
Grand Junction–Montrose	KKCO-DT2	—N/a	The CW	MeTV
Grand Junction–Montrose	KGJT-CD	UPN	MyNetworkTV	
Grand Rapids–Kalamazoo–Battle Creek	WWMT-DT2	—N/a	The CW	
Grand Rapids–Kalamazoo–Battle Creek	WXSP-CA	UPN	MyNetworkTV	
Great Falls	KRTV-DT2	—N/a	The CW	
Great Falls	KLMN	UPN	MyNetworkTV	Defunct
Green Bay–Appleton	WIWB	The WB	The CW	
Green Bay–Appleton	WACY-TV	UPN	MyNetworkTV	Independent
Greensboro–High Point–Winston-Salem	WTWB-TV	The WB	The CW	
Greensboro–High Point–Winston-Salem	WUPN-TV	UPN	MyNetworkTV	
Greenville–New Bern–Washington	WNCT-DT2	—N/a	The CW	
Greenville–New Bern–Washington	WPXU-TV	i	i / MyNetworkTV	Ion
Greenville–New Bern–Washington	WEPX-TV	i	i / MyNetworkTV	Ion
Greenville–Spartanburg–Asheville–Anderson	WBSC-TV	The WB	MyNetworkTV	
Greenville–Spartanburg–Asheville–Anderson	WASV-TV	UPN	The CW	
Harrisburg–Lancaster–Lebanon–York	WLYH-TV	UPN	The CW	Univision
Harrisburg–Lancaster–Lebanon–York	WHP-DT2	—N/a	MyNetworkTV	
Harrisonburg	WHSV-DT4	—N/a	MyNetworkTV	
Hartford–New Haven	WTXX	The WB	The CW	
Hartford–New Haven	WCTX	UPN	MyNetworkTV	
Helena	KMTF	The WB	The CW	PBS
Honolulu	KHON-DT2	—N/a	The CW	
Honolulu	KFVE	The WB	MyNetworkTV	
Honolulu	KAII-DT2	—N/a	The CW	
Honolulu	KGMD-TV	The WB	MyNetworkTV	
Honolulu	KGMV	The WB	MyNetworkTV	
Honolulu	KHAW-DT2	—N/a	The CW	
Honolulu	KIKU	Independent / UPN	Independent / Funimation Channel	Independent
Houston	KTXH	UPN	MyNetworkTV	
Houston	KIAH	The WB	The CW	
Huntsville–Decatur	WHDF	UPN	The CW	
Huntsville–Decatur	WZDX-DT2	The WB	MyNetworkTV	
Idaho Falls–Pocatello	KPIF	The WB	The CW	MeTV
Indianapolis	WTTV	The WB	The CW	CBS
Indianapolis	WNDY-TV	UPN	MyNetworkTV	
Indianapolis	WTTK	The WB	The CW	CBS
Jackson, MS	WRBJ	UPN	The CW	TBN
Jackson, MS	WUFX	The WB	MyNetworkTV	
Jacksonville	WJWB	The WB	The CW	
Jacksonville	WAWS-DT2	—N/a	MyNetworkTV	
Johnstown–Altoona–State College	WHVL-LD	—N/a	MyNetworkTV	
Juneau	KJUD-DT2	—N/a	The CW	
Juneau	K17HC	UPN	MyNetworkTV	Defunct
Kansas City	KCWE	UPN	The CW	
Kansas City	KSMO-TV	The WB	MyNetworkTV	
Knoxville	WVLT-DT2	UPN	MyNetworkTV	
Knoxville	WBXX	The WB	The CW	
La Crosse–Eau Claire	WKBT-DT2	UPN	MyNetworkTV	
La Crosse–Eau Claire	WQOW-DT2	—N/a	The CW	
La Crosse–Eau Claire	WXOW-DT2	—N/a	The CW	
Lafayette, LA	K58GA	UPN	MyNetworkTV	NBC
Lafayette, LA	KLWB	The WB	The CW	MeTV
Lansing	WHTV	UPN	MyNetworkTV	Defunct
Lansing	WLAJ-DT2	The WB	The CW	
Laredo	KGNS-DT2	The WB	The CW	ABC
Las Vegas	KVMY	The WB	MyNetworkTV	MeTV
Las Vegas	KTUD-CA	UPN	Independent	Defunct
Las Vegas	KFBT	The WB	The CW	
Lexington	WKYT-DT2	UPN	The CW	
Lexington	WBLU-LP	Independent	MyNetworkTV	Defunct
Lima	WOHL-CA	Fox	Fox / MyNetworkTV	ABC
Lincoln–Hastings–Kearney	KOLN-DT2	UPN	MyNetworkTV	NBC
Lincoln–Hastings–Kearney	KGIN-DT2	UPN	MyNetworkTV	NBC
Lincoln–Hastings–Kearney	KOWH	The WB	The CW	Fox
Little Rock	KASN	UPN	The CW	
Little Rock	KWBF	The WB	MyNetworkTV	
Los Angeles	KTLA	The WB	The CW	
Los Angeles	KCOP-TV	UPN	MyNetworkTV	
Louisville	WBKI-TV	The WB	The CW	
Lubbock	KUPT-LP	UPN	MyNetworkTV	
Lubbock	KWBZ-TV	The WB	The CW	
Macon	WMGT-DT2	—N/a	MyNetworkTV	
Madison	WISC-DT2	UPN	MyNetworkTV	
Madison	WBUW	The WB	The CW	Ion
Marquette	WMQF	Fox / UPN	MyNetworkTV	MeTV
Medford–Klamath Falls	KFBI-LD	UPN	MyNetworkTV	
Memphis	WLMT	The WB / UPN	The CW	The CW / MyNetworkTV
Memphis	WPXX-TV	i	MyNetworkTV	Ion
Meridian	WTOK-DT3	—N/a	The CW	
Miami–Fort Lauderdale	WBFS-TV	UPN	MyNetworkTV	The CW
Miami–Fort Lauderdale	WBZL	The WB	The CW	Independent
Milwaukee	WVTV	The WB	The CW	
Milwaukee	WCGV-TV	UPN	MyNetworkTV	
Minneapolis–Saint Paul	KMWB	The WB	The CW	
Minneapolis–Saint Paul	KFTC	UPN	MyNetworkTV	
Minneapolis–Saint Paul	WFTC	UPN	MyNetworkTV	Fox / MyNetworkTV
Missoula	KMMF	Fox	Fox / MyNetworkTV	Defunct
Mobile–Pensacola	WFGX	Independent	MyNetworkTV	
Mobile–Pensacola	WBPG	The WB	The CW	
Monroe–El Dorado	KNOE-DT2	—N/a	The CW	ABC
Monroe–El Dorado	KMCT-TV	i	MyNetworkTV	Religious Independent
Monroe–El Dorado	KEJB	UPN	MyNetworkTV	Defunct
Monterey–Salinas	KOTR-LP	Independent	MyNetworkTV	
Monterey–Salinas	KION-DT2	—N/a	The CW	
Montgomery–Selma	WBMM	Daystar	The CW	
Montgomery–Selma	WRJM-TV	UPN	MyNetworkTV	
Myrtle Beach–Florence	WBTW-DT2	—N/a	MyNetworkTV	
Myrtle Beach–Florence	WWMB	UPN	The CW	
Nashville	WUXP-TV	UPN	MyNetworkTV	
Nashville	WNAB	The WB	The CW	Dabl
New Orleans	WNOL	The WB	The CW	
New Orleans	WUPL	UPN	MyNetworkTV	
New York City	WWOR-TV	UPN	MyNetworkTV	
New York City	WPIX	The WB	The CW	
Norfolk–Portsmouth–Newport News	WGNT	UPN	The CW	
Norfolk–Portsmouth–Newport News	WTVZ-TV	The WB	MyNetworkTV	
Odessa–Midland	KOSA-DT2	UPN	MyNetworkTV	The CW
Odessa–Midland	KWWT	The WB	The CW	MyNetworkTV
Oklahoma City	KOCB	The WB	The CW	Independent
Oklahoma City	KAUT-TV	UPN	MyNetworkTV	The CW
Omaha	KXVO	The WB	The CW	TBD
Omaha	KPTM-DT2	—N/a	MyNetworkTV	MyNetworkTV / Dabl
Orlando–Daytona Beach–Melbourne	WKCF	The WB	The CW	
Orlando–Daytona Beach–Melbourne	WRBW	UPN	MyNetworkTV	
Paducah–Cape Girardeau–Harrisburg	WQWQ-LP	UPN	The CW	
Paducah–Cape Girardeau–Harrisburg	KFVS-DT2	UPN	The CW	
Paducah–Cape Girardeau–Harrisburg	KBSI-DT2	The WB	MyNetworkTV	
Paducah–Cape Girardeau–Harrisburg	WQTV-LP	UPN	The CW	Defunct
Paducah–Cape Girardeau–Harrisburg	WDKA	The WB	MyNetworkTV	
Palm Springs	KCWQ-LD	The WB	The CW	
Palm Springs	KESQ-DT3	The WB	The CW	
Palm Springs	KPSE-LP	UPN	MyNetworkTV	
Panama City	WJHG-DT2	The WB	The CW	
Parkersburg	W64CS-DT2	—N/a	MyNetworkTV	MyNetworkTV / MeTV
Peoria–Bloomington	WHOI-DT2	—N/a	The CW	Charge!
Peoria–Bloomington	WAOE	UPN	MyNetworkTV	Infomercials
Philadelphia	WPHL-TV	The WB	MyNetworkTV	The CW
Philadelphia	WPSG	UPN	The CW	Independent
Phoenix	KUTP	UPN	MyNetworkTV	
Phoenix	KASW	The WB	The CW	Independent
Pittsburgh	WNPA	UPN	The CW	Independent
Pittsburgh	WCWB	The WB	MyNetworkTV	The CW / MyNetworkTV
Portland–Auburn	WPME	UPN	MyNetworkTV	Ion
Portland–Auburn	WPXT	The WB	The CW	
Portland, OR	KWBP	The WB	The CW	
Portland, OR	KPDX	UPN	MyNetworkTV	
Providence–New Bedford	WLWC	The WB	The CW	Court TV
Providence–New Bedford	WNAC-DT2	—N/a	MyNetworkTV	The CW
Quincy–Hannibal–Keokuk	WGEM-DT2	The WB	The CW	
Raleigh–Durham	WLFL	The WB	The CW	
Raleigh–Durham	WRDC	UPN	MyNetworkTV	
Rapid City	KCLO-DT2	UPN	MyNetworkTV	The CW
Rapid City	KKRA-LP	i	MyNetworkTV	NBC
Rapid City	KWBH-LP	The WB	The CW	MyNetworkTV
Reno	KAME-TV	UPN	MyNetworkTV	Independent / MyNetworkTV
Reno	KREN-TV	The WB	The CW	Univision
Richmond–Petersburg	WRLH-DT2	—N/a	MyNetworkTV	
Richmond–Petersburg	WUPV	UPN	The CW	
Roanoke–Lynchburg	WDBJ-DT2	Independent	MyNetworkTV	Circle
Roanoke–Lynchburg	WJPR	Fox	The CW	
Roanoke–Lynchburg	WFXR-DT2	—N/a	The CW	
Rochester–Mason City–Austin	KIMT-DT2	—N/a	MyNetworkTV	
Rochester–Mason City–Austin	KTTC-DT2	The WB	The CW	
Rochester, NY	WHAM-DT2	The WB	The CW	
Rochester, NY	WBGT-LP	UPN	MyNetworkTV	
Rockford	WREX-DT2	The WB	The CW	
Rockford	WTVO-DT2	UPN	MyNetworkTV	
Sacramento–Stockton–Modesto	KMAX	UPN	The CW	Independent
Sacramento–Stockton–Modesto	KQCA	The WB	MyNetworkTV	The CW / MyNetworkTV
Salisbury	WMDT-DT2	The WB	The CW	
Salt Lake City	KJZZ	Independent	MyNetworkTV	Independent
Salt Lake City	KPNZ	UPN	Independent	Azteca América
Salt Lake City	KUWB	The WB	The CW	
San Angelo	KIDY-DT2	—N/a	MyNetworkTV	
San Angelo	KTXE-LD2	—N/a	The CW	
San Antonio	KBEJ	The WB	The CW	MyNetworkTV
San Antonio	KRRT	UPN	MyNetworkTV	Dabl
San Diego–Tijuana	XHUPN-TV	UPN	MyNetworkTV	Milenio Televisión
San Diego–Tijuana	KSWB-TV	The WB	The CW	Fox
San Francisco	KRON-TV	Independent	MyNetworkTV	The CW / MyNetworkTV
San Francisco	KBWB	The WB	Independent	Grit
San Francisco	KBHK-TV	UPN	The CW	Independent
Santa Barbara–Santa Maria–San Luis Obispo	KEYT-DT2	—N/a	MyNetworkTV	
Santa Barbara–Santa Maria–San Luis Obispo	KSBY-DT2	The WB	The CW	
Savannah	WSAV-DT3	—N/a	MyNetworkTV	Court TV
Savannah	WSCG	UPN	The CW	TCT
Seattle–Tacoma	KSTW	UPN	The CW	Independent
Seattle–Tacoma	KTWB-TV	The WB	MyNetworkTV	
Sherman–Ada	KTEN-DT2	—N/a	The CW	
Sherman–Ada	KXII-DT2	UPN	MyNetworkTV	
Shreveport	KPXJ	UPN	The CW	
Shreveport	KSHV-TV	The WB	MyNetworkTV	
Sioux City	KTIV-DT2	The WB	The CW	
Sioux City	KPTH-DT2	—N/a	MyNetworkTV	
Sioux Falls	KDLO-DT2	UPN	MyNetworkTV	
Sioux Falls	KPLO-DT2	UPN	MyNetworkTV	
Sioux Falls	KELO-DT2	UPN	MyNetworkTV	
Sioux Falls	KWSD	The WB	The CW	Independent
South Bend	WSBT-DT2	UPN	Independent	Fox
South Bend	WAAT-LP	The WB	The CW	
South Bend	WCWW-LP	Independent	MyNetworkTV	
Spokane	KXLY-TV	ABC / UPN	ABC	
Spokane	KUUP-LP	ABC / UPN	MyNetworkTV	ABC
Spokane	KSKN	The WB	The CW	
Springfield–Holyoke	WGGB-DT2	The Tube	Fox / MyNetworkTV	
Springfield, MO	K15CZ	UPN	The CW	ABC
Springfield, MO	K17DL	UPN	The CW	Tourist Info.
Springfield, MO	KWBM	The WB	MyNetworkTV	Daystar
St. Croix, USVI	WCVI-TV	UPN	The CW	CBS
St. Louis	KPLR	The WB	The CW	
St. Louis	WRBU	UPN	MyNetworkTV	Ion
Syracuse	WSTM-DT2	UPN	The CW	
Syracuse	WSTQ-LP	UPN	The CW	Defunct
Syracuse	WNYS-TV	The WB	MyNetworkTV	
Tallahassee–Thomasville	WTLF	The WB	The CW	
Tallahassee–Thomasville	WFXU	The WB	The CW	MeTV / MyNetworkTV
Tallahassee–Thomasville	WTLH-DT2	The WB	The CW	
Tampa–St. Petersburg	WTTA	The WB	MyNetworkTV	The CW
Tampa–St. Petersburg	WTOG	UPN	The CW	Independent
Toledo	WNGT-LP	UPN	MyNetworkTV	MyNetworkTV / Cozi TV
Topeka	WIBW-DT2	—N/a	MyNetworkTV	
Topeka	KSNT-DT2	—N/a	The CW	Fox
Tri-Cities, TN–VA	WCYB-DT2	The WB	The CW	
Tri-Cities, TN–VA	WAPK-CA	UPN	MyNetworkTV	MeTV
Tucson	KTTU	UPN	MyNetworkTV	
Tucson	KWBA-TV	The WB	The CW	
Tulsa	KWBT	The WB	The CW	
Tulsa	KTFO	UPN	MyNetworkTV	
Twin Falls	KMVT-DT2	—N/a	The CW	
Tyler–Longview	KTPN-LP	Independent	MyNetworkTV	
Tyler–Longview	KCEB	The WB	The CW	Azteca América
Utica	WKTV-DT2	The WB	The CW	CBS
Utica	WPNY-LP	UPN	MyNetworkTV	
Utica	WUTR-DT2	UPN	MyNetworkTV	
Victoria	K39HB	The WB	The CW	Defunct
Victoria	KXTS-LP	UPN	MyNetworkTV	CBS
Waco–Temple–Bryan	KBTX-DT2	UPN	The CW	
Waco–Temple–Bryan	KWTX-DT2	UPN	The CW	Telemundo
Washington, DC	WDCA	UPN	MyNetworkTV	
Washington, DC	WBDC-TV	The WB	The CW	
Watertown	WWTI-DT2	The WB	The CW	
Wausau–Rhinelander	WSAW-DT2	—N/a	MyNetworkTV	MyNetworkTV / MeTV
Wausau–Rhinelander	WAOW-DT2	The WB	The CW	Catchy Comedy
Wausau–Rhinelander	WYOW-DT2	The WB	The CW	Defunct
West Palm Beach–Fort Pierce	WTVX	UPN	The CW	
West Palm Beach–Fort Pierce	WTVX-DT3	The WB	MyNetworkTV	
West Palm Beach–Fort Pierce	WTCN-CA	The WB	MyNetworkTV	
Wichita Falls–Lawton	KFDX-DT2	UPN	MyNetworkTV	
Wichita Falls–Lawton	KAUZ-DT2	The WB	The CW	
Wichita Falls–Lawton	KBJO-LD	UPN	MyNetworkTV	
Wichita–Hutchinson	KWCV	The WB	The CW	
Wichita–Hutchinson	KSCC	UPN	MyNetworkTV	
Wilkes-Barre–Scranton–Hazleton	WSWB	The WB / UPN	The CW	
Wilkes-Barre–Scranton–Hazleton	WILF	The WB / UPN	MyNetworkTV	
Wilkes-Barre–Scranton–Hazleton	WQMY-DT3	—N/a	The CW	
Wilkes-Barre–Scranton–Hazleton	WOLF-DT2	—N/a	The CW	
Wilkes-Barre–Scranton–Hazleton	WOLF-DT3	—N/a	MyNetworkTV	
Wilmington	W47CK	—N/a	MyNetworkTV	Defunct
Yakima–Pasco–Richland–Kennewick	KAZW-TV	Azteca América	The CW	Defunct
Youngstown	WFMJ-DT2	The WB	The CW	
Youngstown	WYTV-DT2	—N/a	MyNetworkTV	
Yuma–El Centro	KECY-TV	Fox	Fox / MyNetworkTV	
Yuma–El Centro	KSWT-DT2	—N/a	The CW	NBC

== Repercussions ==
=== Comparisons to 1994 realignment ===
The WB and UPN were the first major television networks to shut down since the collapse of the DuMont Television Network in 1956, although other small broadcast television networks have also ceased operations over the years. Given the merger of the two networks to create The CW (as well as the eventual launch of MyNetworkTV and the proliferation of digital subchannels), the scope of the realignment caused the largest single shakeup in American broadcast television since the Fox/New World Communications alliance of 1994, which preceded the subsequent launches of UPN and The WB the following year that drastically reduced the number of independent television stations in the U.S., some of which had been marketed and distributed as superstations as recently as the mid-1990s.

While The CW's debut affected more markets, unlike the Fox/New World deal of the mid-1990s, it was unlikely to cause the same degree of viewer confusion as almost no affiliates of the four major networks dropped those affiliations to become CW affiliates. Only two former Big Four affiliates switched their primary affiliation, in both cases from Fox to MyNetworkTV:

- In the Jackson, Mississippi, market, Fox affiliate WUFX swapped affiliations with WDBD in the summer before joining MyNetworkTV the following season after three seasons with Fox. Unrelated UPN affiliate WRBJ, which signed on the air in early 2006, joined The CW.
- In the Fort Smith-Fayetteville, Arkansas, market, low-power Fox affiliate KPBI-CA switched to MyNetworkTV, along with KPBI. Fox had moved its affiliation to full-power KFTA-TV, formerly a satellite of NBC affiliate KNWA-TV. None of the three stations that were available (the two KPBI's and UPN affiliate KFDF-CA) joined The CW; they were all owned by Equity Broadcasting, which shunned The CW in every one of its markets (KFDF-CA joined the Equity-owned Retro Television Network instead). The CW would finally come to the market the following year on a cable-only channel available via Cox Communications (and eventually on digital subchannels of the market's ABC affiliate, KHBS/KHOG-TV). Equity would eventually declare bankruptcy in 2009 due to a number of factors involving the digital transition and problems with RTV which led it to losing control of that network to Luken Communications.

There were several other cases where Big Four affiliates picked up The CW, MyNetworkTV, or both as a secondary affiliation on their main channel or as a digital subchannel affiliation, even in markets where viable non-network affiliate stations remained.

=== Network affiliation repercussions ===
In media markets where there were separate affiliates of The WB and UPN, one local station was left out in the merger. Many of these stations signed with MyNetworkTV including the vast majority of the Fox stations acquired in the 2001 acquisition of BHC Communications (the former Chris-Craft stations). Additionally, MyNetworkTV signed with three Tribune stations that did not take the CW affiliation: WPHL in Philadelphia (which joined The CW in 2023 after Nexstar purchased the network in 2022), WATL in Atlanta and KTWB in Seattle. Tribune had indicated interest in Fox-developed programming blocks such as MyNetworkTV for stations that did not pick up the CW affiliation; the company announced on May 15 that the aforementioned stations would join MyNetworkTV. In contrast, CBS initially seemed more hostile to MyNetworkTV, and announced its remaining UPN affiliates – KTXA in the Dallas/Fort Worth metroplex, WSBK-TV in Boston, WBFS-TV in Miami/Fort Lauderdale, and WUPL in New Orleans as well as WB affiliate WTCN-CA in West Palm Beach – would all become independents. Four of the five stations, excluding KTXA, eventually all joined MyNetworkTV.

Some stations bypassed by The CW that did not take MyNetworkTV instead opted to become (or revert to) independents. For example, the two remaining former Viacom-owned UPN stations – WSBK and KTXA – reverted to their roots as independents (the latter was constrained to independence in any event due to Fox-owned KDFI, affiliating with MyNetworkTV). As a consequence, in three of the top 10 media markets – Boston, Dallas/Fort Worth and San Francisco – programs from The WB, UPN and MyNetworkTV were all available to viewers from September 5 to 17. MyNetworkTV affiliated with longtime former independents WZMY in Derry, New Hampshire (serving the Boston market) and KDFI, while in San Francisco the network affiliated with KRON-TV; WB affiliate KBWB reverted to independent status. Other stations elected to become (or revert to) independents as well, particularly in situations where either more than two non-major network affiliate stations existed or another station picked up an affiliation with The CW or MyNetworkTV via a digital subchannel.

Additionally, four former UPN affiliates became affiliates of "Big Four" networks themselves:

- WJKT in Jackson, Tennessee, and the digital subchannel of WBOC in Salisbury, Maryland, joined Fox on August 21, 2006.
- WLQP-LP in Lima, Ohio, became the local ABC affiliate on September 1, 2006.
- WSWG in Valdosta, Georgia, became a CBS affiliate and added MyNetworkTV as a digital subchannel on September 4.

Additionally, while some stations joined newly established or lesser-known broadcast networks such as RTV), whose now-defunct parent company Equity Broadcasting did not commit any of its WB affiliates to The CW, other stations (mainly digital subchannels, cable channels such as those that were WB 100+ cable channels, and struggling low-power stations) which received neither The CW nor the MyNetworkTV affiliation opted instead to cease operations entirely. For example, in Dayton, Ohio, the "UPN17" cable channel run by CBS affiliate WHIO-TV closed down at the end of 2006.

Many households around the country were not able to see The CW when it launched, because stations in several markets that agreed to carry the station on a digital subchannel were unsuccessful in securing deals with Time Warner Cable to carry these subchannels on basic cable lineups. These markets included Cincinnati, Honolulu, Charleston, South Carolina, El Paso, Corpus Christi, Palm Springs and Lima, Ohio.

In Cincinnati, eventual independent WBQC-LP moved UPN programming on July 4 to the early morning hours, with the intention of promoting the station's "Independence Day" programming in its place. Before the merger, Granite Broadcasting Corporation agreed to sell KBWB and WDWB to AM Media, a unit of private equity firm ACON Investments; as The CW affiliated with KBCW and WKBD, respectively, the Granite-AM Media deal collapsed, prompting Granite to sue CBS and Time Warner over the failed deal. In New Orleans, CBS sued Belo in February 2006, alleging Belo tried to back out of a deal for WUPL after Tribune-owned WNOL was named the market's CW affiliate, but before WUPL's affiliation with MyNetworkTV was announced. The deal, already complicated in the aftermath of Hurricane Katrina, would create a duopoly between Belo's WWL-TV and WUPL.

== Closing UPN and The WB ==
UPN quietly ceased operations on September 15, 2006, by fading to black after its usual airing of WWE Friday Night SmackDown!; however, the Fox-owned lame-duck UPN affiliates dropped the network entirely on August 31 in order for MyNetworkTV to launch on September 5. Because of this, UPN was entirely unavailable for its final two weeks in those markets; as a result, SmackDown was on several Tribune-owned charter CW affiliates, including WPIX, KTLA, and WGN, per an earlier arrangement with WWE.

The WB closed on September 17 with The Night of Favorites and Farewells, a five-hour block of pilot episodes of the network's past signature series, including Felicity, Angel, Buffy the Vampire Slayer and Dawson's Creek. Commercial breaks shown on the network that evening featured re-airings of past image campaigns and network promotions, promo spots given to cable networks that carried these shows in off-network syndication, as well as ads for each series' TV-on-DVD box set. The final night of WB programming, which aired against NBC Sunday Night Football, netted low ratings.

== Post-realignment ==
After launching, The CW usually finished fifth in the Nielsen ratings and even fell behind Spanish-language network Univision at times. While the network had some successful series such as Gossip Girl, The Vampire Diaries and Arrow, concerns over The CW's future led Tribune to rebrand their CW affiliates in a way that deemphasized its network affiliation. Pappas Telecasting Companies cited The CW's poor performance as a factor in its Chapter 11 bankruptcy filing. In September 2008, The CW outsourced its five-hour Sunday block to Media Rights Capital (MRC); the network dropped its Sunday night lineup in 2009 and would not air on that night until 2018, with only two hours to program.

The CW's ratings struggles eventually subsided in later years: the network beat NBC for the first time in the key 18–49 demographic for a single calendar night on November 21, 2013. Other recent series successes (including the revival of the U.S. version of the improv comedy series Whose Line Is It Anyway?, The Flash and Jane the Virgin) helped The CW increase its ratings year-over-year by the 2014–15 season – at which point, The CW posted its highest season average total viewership since the 2007–08 season with 2.15 million.

MyNetworkTV struggled to gain an audience upon its launch. Due to its consistently low ratings with their initial program lineup of telenovelas and its 2007 retool to include more unscripted programming (including televised martial arts events) and movies, MyNetworkTV became a rerun-focused syndication service in 2009. The service's last first-run program, SmackDown, moved to Syfy and USA Network in October 2010.

Nexstar Media Group, which acquired Tribune Media in 2019 after a prior failed merger attempt with Sinclair Broadcast Group, assumed operations of The CW on August 15, 2022, and acquired a 75% ownership stake in The CW on October 3, 2022; former joint owners Paramount Skydance (successor to CBS Corporation) and Warner Bros. Discovery (successor to Time Warner) retained a 25% stake, split at nominal 12.5% stakes for both companies. Under the agreement, Paramount was given a right with the transaction to disaffiliate all eight of their CW affiliates, which was exercised on May 5, 2023. By the time of the disaffiliations on September 1, Nexstar repatriated the CW affiliations onto their MyNetworkTV affiliates in Philadelphia, San Francisco and Tampa–St. Petersburg, and signed long-term affiliation agreements with Hearst Television, Gray Television, and Sinclair Broadcast Group. However, WKBD-TV in Detroit would subsequently sign a deal to re-affiliate with The CW on September 1, 2024, alongside first-time affiliate WBFS-TV in Miami; both stations are in markets where the previous CW affiliate had been owned by the E. W. Scripps Company, which announced plans to drop The CW from its stations in that timeframe. This came after Mission Broadcasting, a Nexstar affiliate company, failed to purchase WADL—which Nexstar intended to be the permanent replacement CW affiliate in Detroit—and WADL owner Kevin Adell terminated the station's CW contract after two months. On June 2, 2025, it was announced that WUPA in Atlanta would become a CBS owned-and-operated station on August 16, 2025, replacing WANF, which became an independent station.

== See also ==
- 1989 South Florida television affiliation switch
- 1994–1996 United States broadcast television realignment
- 2001 Vancouver TV realignment
- 2007 Canada broadcast TV realignment
- 2023–24 United States broadcast television realignment
