= KRQE =

Television station in Albuquerque, New Mexico

- Albuquerque–Santa Fe, New Mexico; United States
- City: Albuquerque, New Mexico
- Channels: Digital: 13 (VHF); Virtual: 13
- Branding: KRQE Channel 13; KRQE Xtra (13.2); KRQE News

Programming
- Affiliations: 13.1: Fox; 13.2: Independent; 13.3: Bounce TV

Ownership
- Owner: Nexstar Media Group; (Nexstar Media Inc.)
- Sister stations: KASY-TV; KWBQ

History
- First air date: October 4, 1953
- Former call signs: KGGM-TV (1953–1992)
- Former channel numbers: Analog: 13 (VHF, 1953–2009); Digital: 16 (UHF, 2002–2009)
- Former affiliations: CBS (1953–2026); UPN (secondary, January–October 1995)
- Call sign meaning: Albuquerque

Technical information
- Licensing authority: FCC
- Facility ID: 48575
- ERP: 21.5 kW
- HAAT: 1,287 m (4,222 ft)
- Transmitter coordinates: 35°12′40.1″N 106°26′59″W
- Translator(s): see § Satellite stations and translators

Links
- Public license information: Public file; LMS
- Website: www.krqe.com

KRQE (channel 13) is a television station in Albuquerque, New Mexico, United States, affiliated with the Fox network. It is owned by Nexstar Media Group and operated alongside KWBQ (channel 19), an affiliate of The CW, and KASY-TV (channel 50), an independent station with MyNetworkTV. The three stations share studios on Broadcast Plaza in Albuquerque; KRQE's transmitter is located on Sandia Crest, east of Albuquerque.

KRQE went on the air as CBS affiliate KGGM-TV on October 4, 1953. It was owned by the Hebenstreit family alongside KGGM radio and the first Albuquerque TV station to transmit from Sandia Crest. While it was remembered for non-news local programs such as Captain Billy, a popular children's show that ended when the host was murdered in 1972, it was a laggard in the area of local news, with low ratings and poor quality. General manager Bruce Hebenstreit produced several made-for-TV movies at the station in an attempt to create a market for its own programming; the movies exacerbated strife within the family, which only ended when Bruce died in 1987. The station made its most credible effort at news to that time when it hired veteran Albuquerque anchor Dick Knipfing; it became a more competitive third-place outlet but lost viewers after Knipfing departed in 1989.

Though KGGM-TV had been at a disadvantage in its coverage of outstate New Mexico, this changed in 1989 when the company acquired KBIM-TV in Roswell, giving it parity with its competitors in southeastern New Mexico and folding Roswell into the Albuquerque television market. The acquisition strained the Hebenstreits' finances and was a major factor in their decision to sell the station to Lee Enterprises in 1991. Seeking a fresh start, Lee changed the call sign from KGGM-TV to KRQE in 1992. Lee added a second full-power satellite by purchasing KREZ-TV in Durango, Colorado, in 1994, and helped build KASY-TV in 1995. In the early 2000s, after Knipfing returned, KRQE experienced a surge in news ratings and began competing for first place under the ownership of Emmis Communications.

LIN TV acquired KRQE and four other Emmis stations in 2005. It acquired KASA-TV, then Albuquerque's Fox affiliate, the next year and brought its operations and newscast under KRQE's control. In the mid-2010s LIN was acquired by Media General and Media General by Nexstar; the latter deal required KASA-TV to be divested, resulting in the Fox affiliation moving to a subchannel of KRQE. On August 1, 2026, the CBS affiliation moved to a subchannel of KOAT-TV (channel 7), with Fox becoming the primary offering from KRQE.

== KGGM-TV ==
=== Construction and early years ===
When the Federal Communications Commission (FCC) lifted its multi-year freeze on TV stations, Albuquerque had been assigned two additional VHF television channels: 7 and 13. The New Mexico Broadcasting Company, owner of Albuquerque radio station KGGM, had begun feasibility studies into a TV station in late 1951 and were investigating the suitability of Sandia Crest, a mountain more than 10,000 feet (3,000 m) above sea level, as a transmission site. It elected to apply for channel 13 and build a tower on the mountain. The construction permit was granted on March 12, 1953, putting into action plans that already existed to combine KGGM's ownership with that of KVSF in Santa Fe and build out the Sandia Crest site. In May, KGGM and Albuquerque's existing TV station, KOB-TV (channel 4), announced work would begin on the facility, which promised to provide television to previously unserved areas of New Mexico. While they were competitors, KGGM and KOB also joined in the construction of studios. The stations purchased an entire city block at Fourteenth Street and Coal Avenue SW, divided it, and put up studios across the street from each other.

KGGM-TV began broadcasting on October 4, 1953. It was Albuquerque's third television station; channel 7 had signed on as KOAT-TV two days prior. KGGM-TV was a CBS affiliate, though at the time of its launch, all programs were on film; live network programming was not available in Albuquerque until 1954. KGGM-TV was first to use the Sandia Crest site, as KOB-TV's facility was still under construction when channel 13 began. It boasted New Mexico's first video tape recorder, installed in 1959, and was the first station in the state to originate a local color program, in 1966.

In its early years, KGGM-TV produced local non-news programming including Women's Club of the Air, Club 13, and Los Tres Caballeros (The Three Knights), which station management claimed in 1979 to be the first Spanish-language television program in the United States. In 1956, Robert Ernest "Stretch" Scherer joined the staff of KGGM-TV after short stints at KTBC-TV in Austin, Texas, and KOB-TV. He became the new host of channel 13's children's show, originally titled Captain Seafoam, which became Captain Billy and the USS Seafoam and later Captain Billy. The actor French Stewart, an Albuquerque native, made his first-ever TV appearance as a five-year-old on Captain Billy. In addition to the children's show, Scherer hosted an interview program and KGGM-TV's annual telethon supporting muscular dystrophy organizations. On October 27, 1972, Scherer was shot in the KGGM-TV lobby, dying of his wounds two months later. The lead suspect in the case was believed to suffer from mental illness. Even a year after getting shot, Captain Billy was not replaced.

=== Hebenstreit family management ===
Though the station had various minority owners in its history, including U.S. senator Clinton P. Anderson and Harriscope Broadcasting, KGGM-TV was mostly owned by the Hebenstreit family of Albuquerque. Anton R. Hebenstreit had started the family's involvement in broadcasting in 1928 by buying KGGM radio, then a portable station running out of cash, and permanently locating it in the city.

Gilmore Broadcasting Corporation of Kalamazoo, Michigan, announced it had agreed to buy KGGM radio and television in December 1963; the Hebenstreit family regarded this as premature and called off all sale talks. Gilmore sued to force the sale; New Mexico Broadcasting Company's minority stockholders joined the case in support of Gilmore and unsuccessfully asked for the company to be put in receivership. Gilmore settled its suit in June 1965, shortly before a jury trial was to begin. Anton's son Bruce remained primarily in the family's construction holdings until Anton's health failed in the mid-1960s, putting Bruce in charge of New Mexico Broadcasting Company; New Mexico Broadcasting Company's opposition to the Gilmore lawsuit alleged that Gilmore had used A. R. Hebenstreit's poor health to "trick and entrap" the company into a sale. KGGM radio was sold to WKY Television System of Oklahoma City in 1973 and became KRKE on January 1, 1974.

KGGM-TV's broadcast license was the subject of a long-running FCC investigation after two Hispanic organizations challenged it in 1971, claiming the station discriminated against Hispanics. The Alianza Federal de Pueblos Libres, which filed against three local stations, blamed the lack of local programming responsive to the needs of Mexican Americans for creating the conditions that led to rioting in Albuquerque that year. The Coalition for the Enforcement of Equality in Television and Radio Utilization of Time and Hours (CEETRUTH) alleged that only seven of KGGM-TV's 61 employees had Spanish surnames, a proportion lower than the population of Albuquerque, and that its public affairs programming was inadequate. The matter went to a hearing in 1975; while an administrative law judge ruled in favor of the renewal in 1976, the challengers appealed. In 1980, the commission awarded the station a short-term license renewal for one year; it found that the station had been "lacking in candor" about the content of its local news programming. That year, KGGM-TV beat back an attempt by KOB-TV to encourage CBS to move its affiliation to that station.

Members of the Hebenstreit family became integral to many operations of the station. Bruce's son, Andrew (known on air as John Andrews, having adopted that name on the advice of the general manager of KGGM radio), debuted on Captain Billy in 1963 and returned to KGGM-TV in 1973, rising from reporter to anchor to news director. One of John's sisters, Linda Thorne, also worked as a reporter and news anchor; the other, Catherine, by 1983 was the promotions director.

=== Syndicated program production and TV movies ===
KGGM built a large, five-story-tall soundstage at its studios in 1977. The 110-by-82-foot (34 by 25 m) stage, divided into two studios, was intended to provide Hollywood-quality facilities for local commercial production and other shows. For Bruce Hebenstreit, the soundstage was a springboard to the production of TV shows intended for national distribution.

The first such program was Amy, a country music show featuring singer Amy Gifford. Three years later, Hebenstreit produced a made-for-TV movie at the soundstage, 13 Broadcast Plaza (KGGM-TV's address), as the pilot for a possible TV series. The film, starring Anthony Eisley and Lisa Marie from the soap opera General Hospital, was a nighttime soap opera set at a TV station with musical elements similar to A Star Is Born. A movie also titled Amy and starring Lisa Marie was made; Andrew Hebenstreit and Linda Thorne had parts in the film. All of the movies were shot on videotape.

=== Family strife and KBIM-TV purchase ===
In 1986, Andrew Hebenstreit succeeded Bruce as the president of the New Mexico Broadcasting Company. Bruce remained chairman, with control over programming, and devoted himself to his movie projects. Despite the first two having been made years prior, 13 Broadcast Plaza, Amy, and a third film, a comedy titled Purgatory Open, had still not been released in any form. In July and August, the latter two films were given trial runs on KGGM-TV.

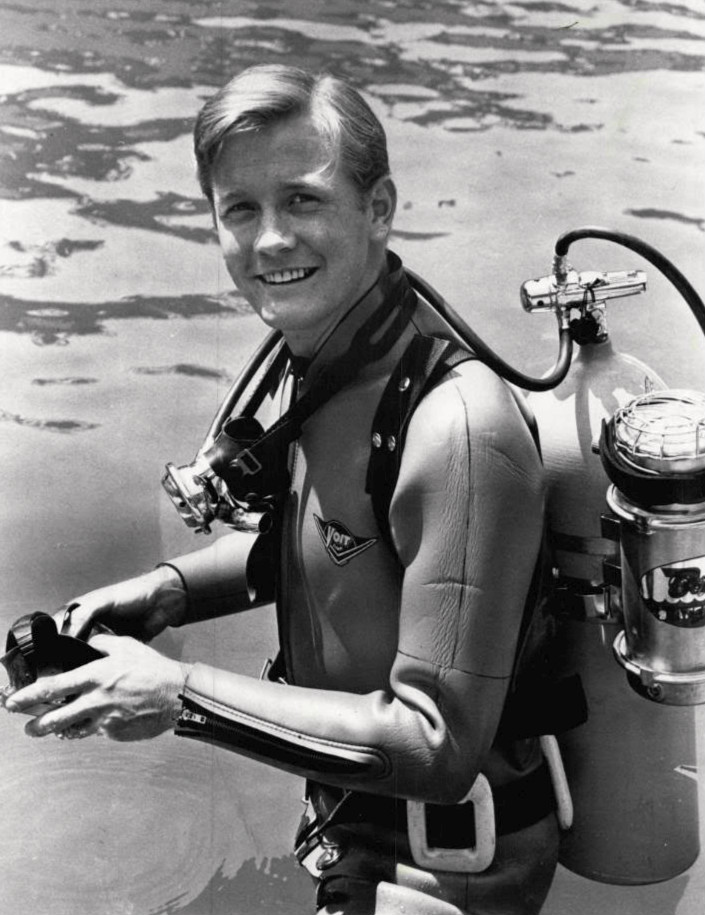
The actor Allan Hunt starred in Purgatory Open, a movie produced by Bruce Hebenstreit, and briefly anchored KGGM-TV's newscasts between 1986 and 1987.

Shortly after taking the job, in mid-August Andrew resigned as president and KGGM-TV news director and moved to Venice, California, after getting in a dispute with Bruce over station operations. Andrew told The Albuquerque Tribune, "I told Bruce his movies made KGGM look like an independent, not a [CBS] affiliate." At the same time, Linda Thorne resigned as news anchor and was replaced by Allan Hunt, who had acted in Purgatory Open. Thorne was reported to have left because the station was switching its evening news to a co-anchor format.

Thorne and Hebenstreit returned within months of resigning as it became apparent that Bruce Hebenstreit, battling cancer, was in poor health—worse than they had realized at the time. He died on February 9, 1987.

New Mexico Broadcasting Company acquired KBIM-TV (channel 10) in Roswell for $5 million in 1989. KBIM-TV had served as a standalone CBS affiliate for southeastern New Mexico, serving 60,000 television homes KGGM-TV did not reach, and had long maintained corporate ties with KGGM-TV. The chairman of its owner, Holsum Inc., had previously been a director of New Mexico Broadcasting and had previously contemplated a merger, instead deciding to sell for economic reasons. The addition of KBIM-TV gave KGGM-TV access to households its competitors, KOAT-TV and KOB-TV, already reached. It also resulted in the abolition of Roswell as a separate television media market by Arbitron and Nielsen; Roswell households were classified in the Albuquerque market, vaulting it from the 56th- or 65th-largest media market to the 51st.

== KRQE ==
=== Sale to Lee Enterprises ===
In 1985, Burt Harris and other minority stockholders in New Mexico Broadcasting Company sold their stakes in the firm, a total of 42 percent, to Iowa-based Lee Enterprises. The transaction left the Hebenstreits in control of KGGM-TV. The KBIM-TV acquisition in 1989 strained New Mexico Broadcasting Company's finances and ultimately led to the Hebenstreits deciding to sell their remaining shares to Lee in a deal announced on July 23, 1991.

Lee Enterprises brought in new management—Jim Thompson, previously the general manager of KGUN-TV in Tucson, Arizona—and set out to fix the image problem that the long-third-rated KGGM-TV had in the market. Andrew Hebenstreit, who worked as a consultant to Lee after the sale, suggested the new management change the station's call sign to refresh its image. On September 7, 1992, KGGM-TV became KRQE.

After purchasing and relaunching KRQE, Lee Enterprises extended KRQE's reach. The next year, it leased and bought KREZ-TV (channel 6) in Durango, Colorado, within the Albuquerque television market. That station had previously rebroadcast KREX-TV of Grand Junction, but began rebroadcasting KRQE after the sale. In the late 1990s, the stations were jointly branded as CBS Southwest.

In addition, Lee expanded beyond KRQE. In 1993, it purchased KZIA-TV (channel 48), an independent station in Las Cruces (in the El Paso, Texas, television market). The company partnered with Ramar Communications to launch a new Albuquerque station: KASY-TV (channel 50), an affiliate of UPN, which Lee began operating for Ramar under a local marketing agreement when it began broadcasting on October 6, 1995. UPN programs had previously aired on KRQE from the network's launch that January. In 1999, KASY became operated by ACME Communications, owner of KWBQ.

=== Emmis and LIN ownership ===
In 2000, Lee Enterprises exited television by selling all but one of its stations to Emmis Communications of Indianapolis for $562.5 million; when Emmis opted to exit television five years later, KRQE was among five stations sold to LIN TV Corporation of Rhode Island.

LIN added a second New Mexico TV station to its fold when it acquired KASA-TV (channel 2), Albuquerque's Fox affiliate, from Raycom Media in 2006. KRQE assumed production of KASA's 9 p.m. local newscast, previously provided by KOB, and integrated KASA's operations into its studios. In 2010, KWBQ and KASY became linked to KRQE again when ACME entered into a shared services agreement for back-office support functions for the stations. LIN was acquired two years later by Media General.

=== Nexstar ownership and disaffiliation from CBS ===
After purchasing LIN, Media General initially agreed to merge with the Meredith Corporation but faced a shareholder revolt in the wake of an unsolicited offer from Nexstar Broadcasting Group, which agreed to acquire the company in 2016. Nexstar's acquisition of Media General required 13 station divestitures, among them KASA, which was sold to Ramar Communications and became a Telemundo affiliate. The Fox affiliation was retained by Nexstar; upon the deal's closing on January 17, 2017, it became Fox New Mexico as a subchannel of KRQE and its satellite stations.

KRQE and its satellites lost their CBS affiliation to KOAT-TV on August 1, 2026, as part of a modified renewal of most other Nexstar affiliations with CBS. Albuquerque was one of four markets where stations owned by Hearst Television assumed the CBS affiliation from Nexstar-owned stations in their markets. KRQE became a primary Fox affiliate with the change, with the second subchannel becoming an independent station, branded as KRQE Xtra. In the wake of the disaffiliation, the station announced plans to expand local news coverage and original non-news programming.

== News operation ==
KGGM news has had a hammerlock on last place in Albuquerque's local news race.

— Elizabeth Staley, writing in the Albuquerque Journal

KGGM-TV's early news efforts were low-rated and lacked resources. In 1977, the station's early evening newscast at 5:30 p.m. was seen in 12,000 homes compared to 37,000 for KOB-TV and 63,000 for KOAT-TV at 6 p.m. Dave Nordstrand of The Albuquerque Tribune called the station's news "the least professional TV news broadcast in the city", chastising it for poor story selection and technical errors. With the early news at 5:30 instead of 6 and the late news at 11 p.m. instead of 10 (at one point it aired at 9 p.m.), KGGM-TV instead counterprogrammed the other stations' newscasts with entertainment. The late news was eliminated altogether and replaced with news breaks and a wrap-up newscast at midnight. By 1981, the station had local news at 5:30 and 10:30 p.m. with locally produced newscasts consisting primarily of national news at 6 and 10 p.m. Despite attempts to improve the quality of the newscasts, KGGM continued to remain firmly in third.

In 1987, with Andrew Hebenstreit in control of KGGM-TV's affairs, the station made a major push to improve its news product and ratings. The highest-profile addition was Dick Knipfing, a veteran Albuquerque anchor who had started his career at KGGM-TV but became famous and popular at KOAT and later worked at KOB until being fired in 1986. Initial response to Knipfing's debut and an accompanying newscast relaunch was positive: in the Albuquerque metropolitan area, KGGM edged ahead of KOB in 10 p.m. news ratings, but KGGM's lack of signal coverage parity with KOB and KOAT in outlying areas meant that it remained third in the full market. It bought a news helicopter, a sign of the station's desire to challenge KOB and KOAT. KOAT hired Knipfing again in 1989, and ratings momentum was lost, with the station suffering year-over-year declines across all of its newscasts and canceling its 5 p.m. report. Under Lee, the station reinstated a 5:30 p.m. early evening news as an alternative to KOB and KOAT at 6, beating KOB's broadcast of NBC Nightly News.

Bill Anderson became KRQE's general manager in 1999, beginning a 25-year run with the station. In 2000, KRQE rehired Knipfing (though he could not appear on air until 2001 due to a non-compete clause) and relaunched its newscasts as KRQE News 13. A new "newsplex", a combination newsroom and studio costing $1 million, was built in one of the former soundstages. In the years that followed, KRQE experienced a steady increase in its news ratings, culminating in a late news sweeps victory in November 2004 and the station being number-one in revenue for the year. Knipfing retired in 2014, culminating a 51-year career in Albuquerque TV news.

By 2022, KRQE had the most total viewers at 10 p.m., but in the demographic of viewers aged 25–54, it was a close second to KOAT, which won most other time periods.

=== Second subchannel ===
With its purchase of KASA, KRQE replaced KOB as that station's news provider in late 2006. A morning newscast from 7 to 9 a.m. debuted on September 16, 2013. The station also airs a lifestyle program, New Mexico Living, at 9 a.m.

== Notable former on-air staff ==
- David F. Cargo – commentator, 1971
- Allan Hunt – anchor, 1986–1987
- Terry McDermott – sportscaster, 1980–1985
- Ray Rayner – weather presenter, early 1980s
- Andrea Thompson – reporter, 2000–2001
- Kelly Wallace – reporter, 1996–1998
- Darren White – reporter and Santa Fe bureau chief, c. 1999–2000

== Technical information ==
=== Satellite stations ===
KRQE broadcasts from Sandia Crest. Its signal is rebroadcast, with local commercials, from two high-power satellite stations, one in southeastern New Mexico and the other in southwestern Colorado.

Satellites of KRQE
Station	City of license	Channels (VC / RF)	First air date	ERP	HAAT	Facility ID	Transmitter coordinates	Public license information
KBIM-TV	Roswell, NM	10; 10 (VHF)	February 24, 1966	24.32 kW	610 m (2,001 ft)	48556	33°3′20″N 103°49′14″W	Profile; LMS
KREZ-TV	Durango, CO	6; 15 (UHF)	September 15, 1963	46 kW	90.4 m (297 ft)	48589	37°15′46″N 107°54′0.2″W	Profile; LMS

KBIM-TV in Roswell signed on February 24, 1966, as the CBS affiliate for southeastern New Mexico. It was co-owned with Roswell radio station KBIM. The 1,839-foot (561 m) tower was the tallest in New Mexico and the world's fourth-tallest at completion, but it collapsed more than a month later. In 1977, a fire gutted the studios. When it was purchased by KGGM-TV in 1989, its news department was partially integrated with that of the Albuquerque station. Local newscasts from Roswell ended on December 12, 2008; KRQE continued to maintain a news presence in Roswell, stationing a reporter there.

KREZ-TV in Durango, Colorado, began operations September 15, 1963, as KJFL-TV, a freestanding local independent station owned by Jeter Telecasting. It was destroyed in a fire on February 21, 1964, and thereafter sold to KREX-TV in Grand Junction, which used it as a satellite. In the early 1980s, KREZ and the other KREX satellite, KREY at Montrose, Colorado, featured local news inserts. KREZ-TV was sold to Lee Enterprises in 1994 and converted to rebroadcast KRQE, with Four Corners–area news inserted into KRQE's news at 5:30 and 10 p.m. The news inserts were dropped in September 1999 and restored in 2001 under Emmis ownership. The three-minute inserts were split between news from Durango and Farmington, New Mexico, limiting their ability to cover the area effectively, and were discontinued in 2005. LIN reached a deal to sell KREZ to Native American Broadcasting, LLC, in April 2011; the firm would have disconnected it from KRQE and converted it to an independent station as KSWZ-TV.

=== Translators ===
In addition, there are several low-power repeaters that carry KRQE's programming throughout New Mexico, including the following:

- Arrey & Derry: K35JR-D
- Cortez, Colorado: K29GO-D
- Deming: K35HB-D
- Eagles Nest: K22MS-D
- Gallup: K19MP-D
- Grants, etc.: K09EP-D
- Hornsby Ranch, etc.: K25HJ-D
- Las Vegas: K30OJ-D
- Many Farms, Arizona: K30GL-D
- Mora: K22EW-D
- Raton, etc.: K15MF-D
- Santa Rosa: K29LN-D
- Silver City: K30KU-D
- Taos, etc.: K21FD-D
- Thoreau: K29KT-D
- Truth or Consequences: K25HV-D
- Tucumcari: K15LZ-D
- Zuni: K26OV-D

=== Subchannels ===
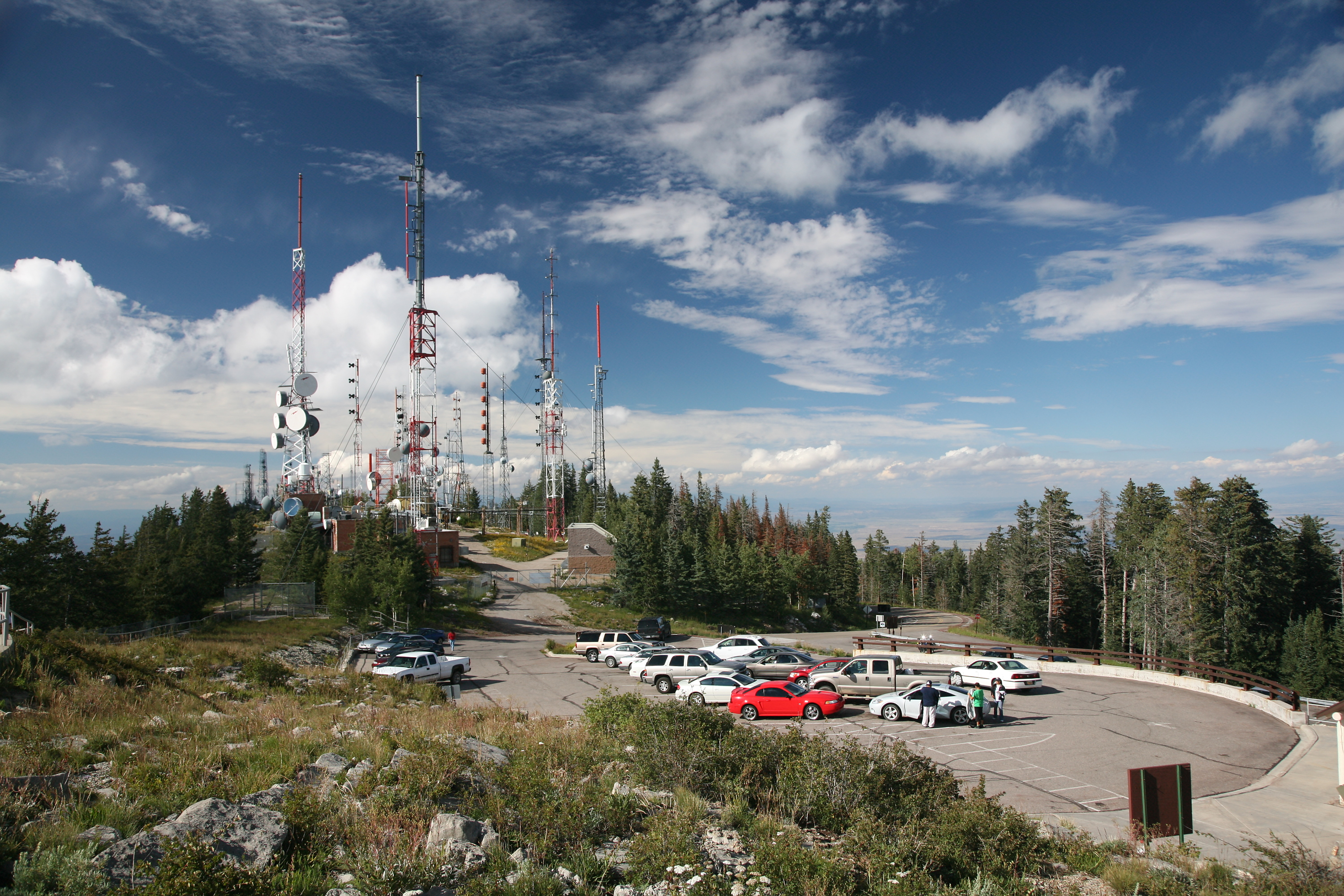
KRQE has broadcast from Sandia Crest since it signed on as KGGM-TV in 1953.

The station's digital signal is multiplexed:

Subchannels of KRQE
Subchannel	Res.	Short name	Programming
13.1	1080i	KRQE	Fox
13.2	720p	KRQEXTR	Independent
13.3	480i	Bounce	Bounce TV (4:3)
50.3	480i	Get TV	Great (KASY-TV)
50.4	480i	Court	Court TV (KASY-TV)

Broadcast on behalf of another station

KRQE began broadcasting a digital signal on UHF channel 16 on May 31, 2002. It shut off its analog signal on June 12, 2009, the federal digital television transition date, and relocated its digital signal to VHF channel 13. KRQE is a participating station in the Albuquerque market's ATSC 3.0 (NextGen TV) broadcasting on KASY-TV.
