= WIFS (TV) =

Television station in Janesville, Wisconsin

- Janesville–Madison, Wisconsin; United States
- City: Janesville, Wisconsin
- Channels: Digital: 21 (UHF); Virtual: 57

Programming
- Affiliations: 57.1: Ion Television; for others, see § Subchannels

Ownership
- Owner: Byrne Acquisition Group, LLC

History
- Founded: April 26, 1989
- First air date: July 5, 1999 (Note: The exact sign-on date in 1999 is unclear; the Broadcasting and Cable Yearbook says June 28, while the Television and Cable Factbook says July 5.)
- Former call signs: WHPN-TV (1999–2002); WBUW (2002–2016)
- Former channel numbers: Analog: 57 (UHF, 1999–2009); Digital: 32 (UHF, until 2019)
- Former affiliations: UPN (1999–2002); The WB (2002–2006); The CW (2006–2016); Independent (2016–2019); Ion Plus (2019–2021)
- Call sign meaning: "Wisconsin's Fifty-Seven"

Technical information
- Licensing authority: FCC
- Facility ID: 26025
- ERP: 175 kW
- HAAT: 454 m (1,490 ft)
- Transmitter coordinates: 43°3′21″N 89°32′6″W

Links
- Public license information: Public file; LMS
- Website: wi57.tv

WIFS (channel 57) is a television station licensed to Janesville, Wisconsin, United States, serving as the Ion Television affiliate for the Madison area. Owned by Byrne Acquisition Group, the station maintains studios on Syene Road on Madison's far south side, and its transmitter is located in Madison's Junction Ridge neighborhood.

== History ==
=== As a UPN/WB/CW affiliate ===
The station's original construction permit was granted on May 2, 1998, with the call letters WJNW. After a few delays and an aborted attempt to become Wisconsin's first digital-only broadcast TV outlet, the station, now under the WHPN call sign, would begin analog broadcasting on channel 57 in the summer of 1999, with partial test airings occurring the week before the station's full-time launch on July 5. The location of its then-transmitter, outside the Rock County community of Evansville, accorded WHPN to serve as the UPN affiliate for both the Madison and Rockford TV markets. Prior to WHPN's launch, UPN programming in Madison had aired on CBS affiliate WISC-TV on a secondary basis.

In the spring of 2002, after WHPN's owners had declared bankruptcy, the station's assets were acquired by ACME Communications, a station group run by Jamie Kellner, a founder of The WB and former CEO of that network and TBS. Though they would not close on the acquisition until the end of 2002, ACME took over operations immediately through a local marketing agreement. The most evident change resulting from ACME's takeover was a network affiliation swap with WISC-owned cable channel/digital subchannel TVW the final week of August 2002; at that time, TVW became Madison's UPN affiliate, while WHPN joined The WB and adopted a new call sign, WBUW (an acknowledgement to its new affiliation and Madison's University of Wisconsin).

In 2004, WBUW moved its transmitter to a new tower located on property owned by Gray Television and next to the studios of Gray-owned WMTV in the Greentree neighborhood of Madison's southwest side. The stronger signal from the new tower allowed WBUW's coverage reach to extend throughout south-central Wisconsin and well into Northern Illinois, allowing WBUW to remain Rockford's default WB affiliate until the launch of The CW in September 2006, when Rockford's WREX-TV (channel 13) added The CW to its secondary subchannel.

In March 2006, WBUW was confirmed as Madison's affiliate of The CW, the result of the WB and UPN networks amalgamating. WBUW, branded as "Madison's CW," was one of eight ACME-owned WB affiliates who joined The CW as a group at the network's September 2006 launch.

On December 13, 2011, ACME announced a deal to sell WBUW to Byrne Acquisition Group; the $1.8 million transaction was part of ACME's gradual exit from the TV business (ACME would formally dissolve at the end of 2016). The deal, which was approved by the Federal Communications Commission (FCC) and consummated in February 2012, gave the Byrne Group its second TV property (after low-power station "WHHI-TV" in Hilton Head Island, South Carolina). The Byrne Group would rebrand WBUW from "Madison's CW" to "CW 57" later in 2012. By that time, it would also upgrade the station's master control (to accommodate local and syndicated high-definition programming) and begin an expansion of locally focused content. By 2015, the station would add its first two digital subchannels.

=== As an independent station ===
An affiliation agreement announced by The CW and Gray Television in December 2015 included the addition of the network to the DT2 subchannel of Gray-owned Madison NBC affiliate WMTV. WMTV-DT2 formally joined The CW on September 12, 2016, when WBUW's 10-year affiliation deal with the network, reached by then-owner ACME Communications at The CW's 2006 launch, reached its expiration. The September 10 airing of The CW's One Magnificent Morning E/I block (ending with Calling Dr. Pol) was the final CW program on WBUW. (Penn & Teller: Fool Us, airing the night before, was the final CW prime time show on the station.)

On-air wise, WBUW would begin its post-CW transition during the first quarter of 2016, when it first applied a simple "Channel 57" brand to its local programming. During its last week as a CW affiliate, it unveiled a new branding of "Wisconsin's 57 Television" ("Your Home for Local"), and would adopt a new call sign to go along with that brand—WIFS—on December 1, 2016. WIFS would retain its mix of locally produced and syndicated programming as an independent, mostly utilizing the latter to fill the prime time void left by The CW's departure.

=== As an Ion Plus and Ion affiliate ===
On February 1, 2019, WIFS added a ninth digital subchannel, affiliated with Ion Television, whose programming had been carried for the two years prior to that on WISC-DT3. That same day, primary channel 57.1 added a round-the-clock feed of Ion's sister network, Ion Life (which would rebrand to Ion Plus the following summer). The changeover was done without any advance word to viewers or local media. The only social media announcement occurred two days after WIFS joined Ion, when the station's Facebook profile picture changed to the default Ion Television logo. (The station's website and social media accounts have been in active yet amber states since then.)

The placement of Ion Plus on WIFS' main channel and Ion on a lower-location subchannel, instead of the other way around, was rather unusual. One reason was to preserve WIFS' commitments to air the Weigel Broadcasting-owned Movies! and Heroes & Icons networks at their respective 57.2 and 57.3 locations. Exposure strategy may have been another reason: During the late 2010s, in markets where network parent Ion Media acquired a second station (mainly involving purchases and shuffles related to the 2016 FCC incentive auction), the company would keep Ion on one station's primary channel and move Ion Plus to the newly acquired signal, thereby taking advantage of the stations' must-carry provisions required of local cable/satellite providers. In the Madison market, WIFS' addition of Ion Plus put that network on equal footing with the national Ion feed that had already been on Madison's cable/satellite TV lineups for several years. It also gave WIFS the distinction of being the only full-powered station that was not owned or operated by Ion Media to carry Ion Plus on its primary channel.

WIFS' move to Ion Plus meant the displacement of all syndicated programs, local features, and local advertising that ran on the station. Jessa Jeremiah, who had been the station's general manager and an on-air host, confirmed to the Northpine.com website that she and station manager Tony Virga were among those no longer employed at WIFS. However, as Jeremiah noted to Northpine.com, the lifestyle and other local programming that had been produced through WIFS would relaunch in February 2019 on TVW, WISC's MyNetworkTV-affiliated subchannel (3.2), either as originally titled (namely the horror movie showcase Bordello of Horror) or under different names (most notably Talk of the Town becoming Talk Wisconsin). A handful of the syndicated content WIFS had carried would also move to TVW that same February.

WIFS would continue its primary affiliation with Ion Plus until February 27, 2021, the weekend E. W. Scripps Company, Ion Media's new owner, indicated it would shut down both Ion Plus and Qubo (the station had just added the latter network at the beginning of 2021). On the morning of the 27th, the programming of both Ion Plus on main channel 57.1 and Qubo on subchannel 57.5 were replaced with the Ion Television feed already shown on 57.9. It would be a permanent move for the main channel, but would lead to a shuffling of networks on the subchannels (see Subchannels below).

== Programming ==
Just prior to joining Ion Life in February 2019, WIFS' programming schedule included syndicated series Access Live, The Doctors, and TMZ as well as The King of Queens, How I Met Your Mother, and Bones. The station also carried live college football and basketball broadcasts from the ACC Network, Chicago Bears preseason football, and tape-delayed broadcasts of Madison Radicals ultimate and Notre Dame Fighting Irish football. WIFS also featured nighttime second airings of Dr. Phil, The Dr. Oz Show, and Entertainment Tonight, all three of which aired earlier in the day on other Madison stations (Phil on WKOW, Oz and ET on WISC-TV).

=== Local news and features ===
In September 2003, WBUW launched The WB57 Nine O'Clock News, a 35-minute, Monday-thru-Friday newscast produced in partnership with the news operations at NBC affiliate WMTV. Geared toward The WB's younger, female-skewing audience, the newscast offered what WBUW station manager Tom Keeler called "a different energy" than that found on other newscasts in Madison. Presented with anchors standing in a desk-free studio, WBUW's newscast featured a fast-paced format (most stories lasted 30 to 60 seconds in length) that largely emphasized entertainment and lifestyle features. Nightly email contests and sweeps-month "free gas giveaways" were also included, as were in-studio performances by local musicians during Friday editions of the newscast. Never gaining notice against competing 9 p.m. newscasts on WMSN-TV and UPN14, WBUW canceled The WB57 Nine O'Clock News and its news-share relationship with WMTV in December 2005, restoring syndicated programming to the time slot.

At the beginning of 2007, local content on WBUW resumed in the form of "Buzzed Into Madison". Airing each day during WBUW's broadcasts of The Daily Buzz (usually around 20 minutes after each hour), the "Buzzed Into Madison" vignettes included "positive" (the station's term) features on Madison-area news, events, and personalities, as well as features with and promotions from station sponsors. The success of "Buzzed into Madison" would lead ACME Communications, The Daily Buzz's then-producer (and WBUW's then-owner), to permit other Daily Buzz affiliates to insert their own local segments if they so desired. Emmy Fink served as the original host and producer of "Buzzed into Madison," doing so from the feature's 2007 launch until she departed WBUW in June 2011. "Buzzed" would air on a limited basis in the subsequent 12 months, with content that included entertainment previews from the Isthmus newspaper and, during the 2011–2012 academic year, a series of "junior reporters" from area schools, with a different student reporter each month. (Emmy Fink would resurrect "Buzzed Into Madison" as a recurring segment for Madison CBS affiliate WISC-TV in Summer 2016.)

When it acquired what was then WBUW in 2012, The Byrne Group would begin a gradual yet eventually significant expansion of the station's local content, using an advertiser-friendly approach similar to that used by its South Carolina sister station. Such local content would occupy significant blocks of WIFS' non-syndicated daily schedule until its move to Ion Plus, featuring discussion programs, sporting events, and other content that featured station sponsors, other businesses, and community/non-profit organizations from Madison and Southern Wisconsin.

== Technical information ==
=== Subchannels ===
The station's signal is multiplexed:

Subchannels of WIFS
Subchannel	Res.	Short name	Programming
57.1	720p	ION HD	Ion Television
57.2	480i	GRIT	Grit
57.3	480i	MYSTERY	Ion Mystery
57.4	480i	BOUNCE	Bounce TV
57.5	480i	LAFF	Laff
57.6	480i	IONPLUS	Ion Plus
57.7	480i	COURTTV	Court TV
57.8	480i	H&I	Heroes & Icons
57.9	480i	COZI	Cozi TV

=== Analog-to-digital conversion ===
WIFS (as WBUW) discontinued programming on its analog signal, over UHF channel 57, on February 17, 2009, the original target date on which full-power television stations in the United States were to transition from analog to digital broadcasts under federal mandate (which was later pushed back to June 12, 2009). From February 17, the analog station acted as a "nightlight", broadcasting a loop of digital transition instructions until signing off for good the first week of March 2009.

WBUW's (and later WIFS') digital signal remained on its pre-transition UHF channel 32, using virtual channel 57. As part of the FCC's reallocation and repackaging of station signals, WIFS relocated to UHF channel 21 on October 18, 2019.

== Logo gallery ==
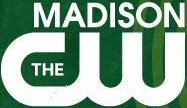
WBUW's logo under the "Madison's CW" branding (c. 2006-2012)

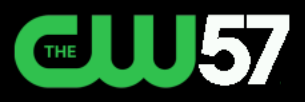
WBUW's final logo as a CW affiliate (c. 2014-2016)

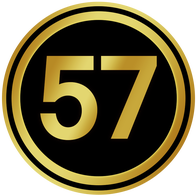
"Wisconsin's 57" logo used on-air 2016–2019 and still found on the wi57.tv website as of December 2024
