= The Daily Buzz =

US television program

- Genre: News program
- Presented by: Lance Smith; Kia Malone
- Country of origin: United States
- Original language: English

Production
- Executive producer: Reina Carbetta
- Running time: 180 minutes (daily, 2002–2015); 60 minutes (weekly, 2017–present)
- Production company: KEF Media

Original release
- Network: First-run syndication (2002–2015, 2017–present); Pop (2017–present); Youtoo TV; Soul of the South
- Release: September 16, 2002 – April 17, 2015
- Release: June 18, 2017 – present

The Daily Buzz (occasionally abbreviated "theDBZ") is a nationally syndicated news and infotainment program. The show premiered as a 3-hour weekday morning television show on September 16, 2002, initially airing on 10 stations owned and operated by the show's founding owner, ACME Communications. By the time of its April 17, 2015 cancellation (the result of show owner Mojo Brands Media declaring bankruptcy), the show was distributed to stations in 149 U.S. television markets. Two years after leaving the air, Buzz would be revived as a weekly series in June 2017, after KEF Media acquired the show's trademark. Despite the fact the revival now broadcasts weekly, the show retains the Daily Buzz name.

From its launch, The Daily Buzz has generally catered to a younger-skewing audience demographic, historically employing an informal atmosphere and a drive-time radio-style approach to presenting and discussing subjects in the realms of current events, lifestyle, entertainment, gossip, and pop culture, as well as celebrity interviews and paid publicity content. The approach set theDBZ apart, during its weekday run, from the traditional tone of network news programs, and would serve as an unofficial template for future national, syndicated, and local morning news shows.

In its weekday run, The Daily Buzz initially aired live for three hours, (6:00–9:00 a.m. ET), eventually shortening to a two-hour time slot (5:00–7:00 a.m. ET) for its last years as a weekday program. Start and running times varied by market, with some stations airing the show as a whole or only one or two hours. For most of its time on air, The CW Plus and its predecessor, The WB 100+ Station Group, carried the show in most smaller markets. The Daily Buzz was also featured on the schedules of the Youtoo TV and Soul of the South networks; streamed live-to-air on the program's website, and uploaded daily to Hulu. When it was revived as a weekly series, Buzz was re-added to the Youtoo America and Soul of the South schedules, added to the schedule of cable network Pop, and offered to various local stations.

== Series history ==
=== Original series (2002–2015) ===
The Daily Buzz was conceived out of a desire by station owner ACME Communications to increase original content to its stations' schedules, most of which aired infomercials and reruns in its morning drive hours, and to bolster local ad revenue for those stations. The Daily Buzz formally launched on the morning of September 16, 2002, airing on 10 ACME-owned stations, all of which were affiliates of The WB Television Network, including the station from which it originated during its first two years on-air, WBDT in Dayton, Ohio. The original on-air talent included anchors Ron Corning and Andrea Jackson, newsreader Peggy Bunker, and weather and features presenter Mitch English.

From its launch, The Daily Buzz employed a personality-driven on-air approach, one that was looser, faster in pace, and sometimes edgy in comparison to tradition-bound network morning television shows broadcast by ABC (Good Morning America), CBS (The Early Show), and NBC (Today): Slang terms, pop music, and host commentaries would be interjected in the news summaries. Pop culture segments were liberally employed (see below). The hosts' employed not-as-formal forms of dress and demeanor (dancing in the lead-outs to commercial breaks were not uncommon). And above all, the liveliness trumped the serious. The lively tone was intentional, as it was meant to attract an audience that was younger in age and were more likely to get their news from sources other than traditional local and network TV newscasts. As Andrea Jackson described it to the Orlando Sentinel in 2005, "We always talk about [The Daily Buzz] as morning radio on television or late-night television in the morning. It's infotainment."

During its early years, The Daily Buzz included several live or prerecorded standing features in its broadcast, all utilizing the show's overall irreverent tone. Among the features were:

- "Plugged Into the News" (the latest news headlines, utilizing content from CNN and Associated Press)
- "News by the Numbers" (a highlighting of numerical figures in notable news stories)
- "Keeping Them Honest" (a clearinghouse for the most ridiculous government- and politically-themed news)
- "Mitch's World" (Mitch English giving his take on the news, ending the segment with a story-related punchline)
- "Old School" (poking fun at vintage commercials, PSAs, and instructional/educational films)
- "Viewer Calls" (calls from actual viewers to a Daily Buzz hotline augmented for TV through the use of 2-frame animation)
- "Water Cooler" (viewer comments shared by Clayton Morris)

On January 1, 2004, ACME Communications would sell a 50% interest in The Daily Buzz to fellow broadcaster Emmis Communications. The deal would lead in a relocation of the show in August 2004 from Dayton to the Orlando, Florida area, and into the Lake Mary studios of Emmis-owned WKCF. In early 2007, WKCF moved to WESH's studios in Winter Park after WESH owners Hearst-Argyle Television acquired WKCF to create a duopoly in the Orlando market; soon afterward, Emmis sold its stake in The Daily Buzz back to ACME.

In mid-April 2007, The Daily Buzz's previous studios were acquired by faith-based Trinity Broadcasting Network and Good Life Broadcasting for new studios for their respective stations, WTGL-TV (now WHLV-TV) and WLCB-TV (the present-day WTGL). At this time, the show also changed Orlando affiliates, from WKCF to WRDQ, and relocated for six weeks to a temporary home inside the Disney-MGM Studios. The show's time at Disney was an interim period until new, permanent studios were completed on the campus of Full Sail University in Winter Park in June 2007. The Daily Buzz's first show at Full Sail aired on June 19, 2007, and they continued to broadcast there until the show's 2015 cancellation.

By the end of the 2000s decade, The Daily Buzz would mature somewhat in tone: Many of the show's looser recurring segments, including some of those mentioned above, were phased out, and The Daily Buzz began to utilize a tone that was tighter and more organized yet still utilizing some of the humor and irreverence it had used since its debut. Also by this time, Buzz producers would allow the show's affiliates two windows each hour to insert their own local content, with national content continuing for stations who did not insert their own segments. The likely genesis for this move was the success of ACME-owned Buzz affiliate WBUW-Madison, Wisconsin, who began adding their own segments (Buzzed Into Madison) in early 2007.

2010–2012 logo.

In 2010, Fisher Communications joined ACME Communications on a licensing and consulting agreement for The Daily Buzz. The agreement allowed Fisher to take over production of the show on ACME's behalf (they would move production to HD in 2010), and gave Fisher the option of purchasing the show from ACME. The agreement also allowed Fisher to create Buzz Brands, a service that offered multimedia content, both local in nature and from The Daily Buzz, to local affiliates for multiple media platforms (including TV, online, and even radio). The first Buzz Brand platform to launch was "GalTime," a female-oriented platform that began with an October 2010 soft launch before expanding nationwide in early 2011; "HeadDrama," which is geared toward advice on mental health concerns, became the second Buzz Brand platform in May 2011. All of the "Buzz Brand" platforms would eventually be phased out, though content from Emotional Mojo, a Mojo Brands-produced program featuring advice on personal development, would be featured on Buzz segments until the shows' 2015 cancellation.

On August 6, 2012, The Daily Buzz unveiled what may have been its most noteworthy transition, introducing a new anchor team that featured actor Charles Divins, veteran TV anchor Lisa Spooner, CMT’s Top 20 Countdown host Lance Smith, and radio personality Jessica Reyes. Original co-host Andrea Jackson remained with the program to host recurring interview segments until October 2013; fellow Buzz veterans Andy Campbell, Mitch English and Kia Malone left the series outright.

By the first quarter of 2013, Daily Buzz owner ACME Communications and operator Fisher Communications had been in the process of a gradual exit from the television business (ACME sold its last remaining TV stations in 2012 and would dissolve as a corporation in 2016; Fisher was in the process of being merged into Sinclair Broadcast Group). On April 1, 2013, ACME sold The Daily Buzz, its last remaining TV property, to Mojo Brands Media. As part of the transaction, Sinclair began to broadcast Buzz on some of its stations beginning in the 2013-14 season; the group had previously not carried the show, with many of its The CW Television Network, MyNetworkTV, and independent stations preferring to carry E/I or paid programming in their morning time slots instead.

=== Cancellation (2015) ===
The Daily Buzz unexpectedly ceased production after its April 17, 2015 episode. In an interview that day with the Orlando Sentinel, Mojo Brands Media COO Troy McGuire noted the cancellation was due to a disagreement with an investor in Mojo, who as a result withdrew their financial support in the company. McGuire did not elaborate further in the interview, citing legal reasons. Details would surface, however, in court documents related to Mojo's Chapter 7 bankruptcy and liquidation filing on May 5, 2015: One creditor of the company, Richard Botnick, had filed suit against Mojo earlier in 2015, alleging the company fell behind on their debt obligations and had defaulted on a loan they made with Botnick. After Botnick's company obtained a garnishment against their bank accounts, Mojo made the decision to immediately cancel Buzz as well as sister program Emotional Mojo.

The cancellations of both The Daily Buzz and Emotional Mojo resulted in the loss of 37 positions involved in the production of both shows, many of whom, it was revealed in Mojo Brands' bankruptcy filing, were still owed money for wages and other expenses. Since Buzz's demise had a sudden, immediate effect, there was no opportunity for an on-air goodbye from the show's staff, who had hoped to reconvene at a later date and deliver an online farewell and thank-you to the show's audience, a plan that would not come to fruition.

Buzz, as a daily show, would leave behind a legacy of being, as termed by reviving company KEF Media, "the gold standard of combining news, hot topics, and [product] integration in a fun, seamless format." Indeed, by the mid-2010s, many national breakfast television programs, and news programs in general, would begin to utilize a not-as-staid presentation. Nationally, Fox News Channel's Fox & Friends has long incorporated lively banter and opinions; broadcast shows such as Today and Good Morning America would over time begin to increase their own entertainment, pop culture, and "water cooler" discussion segments; and Tribune Broadcasting would follow suit, launching Eye Opener on a handful of its stations in 2011 and replacing it with the social media-oriented Morning Dose in 2017.

=== Revival (2017–present) ===
In May 2017, two years after Mojo Brands Media's bankruptcy led to the cancellation of The Daily Buzz, broadcast and digital public relations company KEF Media announced that it would revive The Daily Buzz, after acquiring the show's trademark and branding. Contradicting its title somewhat, the show would be offered initially to broadcasters as a one-hour, once-per-week series (also available as a half-hour weekly series, as it airs on Youtoo), in addition having daily updates on digital platforms. Additional broadcast and digital airings would eventually be added as the show grows.

The Daily Buzz would return to air the weekend of June 18, 2017 (two weekends later than previously announced). As with the original version of the show, The Daily Buzz includes various features on news, pop culture, gossip, entertainment, and other subjects. The show also offers "vertical" segments on consumer affairs, fashion, finance, healthy, hospitality, sports, and travel, utilizing integration of content from the show's sponsors.

The revived Daily Buzz originates from the same studios as the daily version prior to its 2015 cancellation (Full Sail University in Orlando), and is overseen by many of the creative and production personnel from the first incarnation. Two former Buzz hosts have also returned to host the revival, Lance Smith and Kia Malone. Scott Carty (based in Los Angeles) and Josh McBride (based in New York City), joined at the restart as entertainment correspondents, with Howard Henley and Summer Jackson joining later as West Coast and East Coast correspondents respectively.

== On-air personalities ==
=== Current personalities ===
- Lance Smith - co-anchor (2012–2014 and 2017–present)
- Kia Malone - co-anchor (2005–2012 and 2017–present)
- Scott Carty - correspondent
- Howard Henley - correspondent
- Summer Jackson - correspondent
- Josh McBride - correspondent

=== Notable past personalities ===
- Jessica Reyes - co-anchor (2012–2015); currently midday host at WLZL radio Washington, D.C.
- Jared Cotter - co-anchor (2014–2015)
- Charles Divins - co-anchor and "Ask a Hottie" feature correspondent (2012–July 18, 2014); currently at WDSU—New Orleans
- Mitch English - co-anchor, weather anchor, and presenter of the "Rumor Control" and "Mitch's World/World Record Roundup" segments (2002–2012); later returned to daily television as co-host of the similarly formatted rival series The Daily Flash
- Clayton Morris - co-anchor/correspondent and presenter of the "Clayton's Reality", "Keeping Them Honest," and "News by the Numbers" segments (2002–2007); later at Fox News Channel
- Ron Corning - co-anchor (2002–2004, and guest appearance, 2006); later at ABC's World News Now, WNYW's Good Day New York, and at News 12 in New York; most recently at WFAA–Dallas
- Andrea Jackson - co-anchor (2002–2010) and contributor (2011–2013); currently reporter/anchor at WOFL-TV–Orlando
- John Brown- co-anchor; currently morning anchor at WOFL-TV–Orlando
- Dao Vu - co-anchor; currently host of Morning Blend at KTNV-TV–Las Vegas
- Lisa Spooner - co-anchor; currently morning news anchor at WBBH-TV–Fort Myers, Florida
- Peggy Bunker - co-anchor; currently anchor at KNTV-TV–San Jose, California
- Kristen Aldridge - co-anchor; currently morning anchor at KABC-TV–Los Angeles

== Distribution ==
=== 2002–2015 ===
At the time of its April 2015 cancellation, the original version of The Daily Buzz aired in 149 television markets across the United States, reaching roughly 80.9 million homes and 70.9% of the US population. (The show reached roughly 175 markets at its peak.) Rather than airing on stations affiliated with the Big 3 broadcast networks (ABC, CBS, NBC), which rely on their own newscasts and that of those networks, Buzz was offered and sold to various larger- or-middle-sized markets affiliated with Fox, MyNetworkTV, The CW, or independents such as WRDQ in Orlando, The Daily Buzz's home city.

In markets where, for various reasons, The Daily Buzz could not be offered to individual stations, the show was featured on the schedules of cable network Youtoo TV as well as that of digital subchannel network Soul of the South; both networks aired the show on late-morning tape-delay. The show was also featured live-to-air on The CW Plus, The CW network's service for small-market stations (roughly those ranked 100 or lower), an arrangement that ended in September 2014.

Though many stations that aired The Daily Buzz showed the full 2-hour broadcast live-to-air during the 5 a.m.-7 a.m. (ET) time slot, a few stations carried only one hour of the program, while others tape-delayed all or part of the show for a mid- or late-morning airing (between 7-11 a.m.). The full Daily Buzz broadcast also streamed live-to-air online, weekday mornings between 5:00 a.m.–7:00 a.m. (ET) through the program's website. The show was also uploaded daily post-broadcast to Hulu.

During Mojo Brands Media's 2013 acquisition of The Daily Buzz, the company announced plans to distribute the program to international markets in the Caribbean and Latin America. At the time of Buzz's cancellation, it was unclear if or how the show was offered internationally.

The 2015 cancellation of The Daily Buzz left the show's affiliates scrambling for replacement programming to fill the abandoned time slots on their schedules, be it other syndicated shows (a route WCWF/Green Bay would take with second airings of The People's Court), barter lifestyle programming (the route WCGV-TV/Milwaukee would take), paid programming, straight rebroadcasts of a sister station's morning newscast until the fall (which WFNA/Gulf Shores-Mobile, Alabama would do), or their own local content. One Buzz affiliate's program director, commenting to the Orlando Sentinel the day of Buzz's cancellation, felt "more than a little steamed" that he learned of the show's demise second-hand. Mojo Brands' McGuire, in that same Sentinel interview, noted that his company, for its part, was in the process of notifying and working with Buzz affiliates post-cancellation, suggesting that the show's demise was "as unexpected for us as for the affiliates."

Note: The below list is a partial compilation of noteworthy Daily Buzz affiliates at the time of the show's 2015 closure and should not be construed a complete list of stations that aired the program. A January 2015 full list of markets and stations where Buzz was available is posted on the Mojo Brands Media website.

- WVVH-CD New York
- KDOC-TV Los Angeles
- WFMZ-TV Philadelphia
- WHNE-LD Detroit
- WTOG-TV Tampa/St. Petersburg
- WRDQ Orlando
- WBNX-TV Cleveland
- KUSI San Diego
- KCWX Austin/Fredericksburg/San Antonio
- KUCW Salt Lake City
- WCGV-TV Milwaukee
- KVCW Las Vegas
- KSBI Oklahoma City
- KWBQ Albuquerque/Santa Fe
- WCWJ-DT2 Jacksonville
- WFNA Mobile
- WQCW Charleston/Huntington, WV
- WCWF Green Bay
- KDSM-TV Des Moines
- KPTM Omaha
- KRBK Springfield, MO
- WBUW Madison
- KWKB Cedar Rapids/Iowa City

=== 2017–present ===
The 2017 revival of The Daily Buzz is being carried on both the Soul of the South and Youtoo America networks, both of which carried the original program prior to its 2015 cancellation. Soul of the South airs the program Friday mornings at 8AM (ET), while Youtoo America airs it Saturday mornings at 5AM (ET). Buzz also airs Thursday mornings (8:30AM ET) on the cable network Pop. It is unclear as to how many over-the-air stations offer Buzz on its schedules, although it is shown on the schedule of at least one former affiliate of the previous Buzz version (WIFS/Madison, the former WBUW). Video of Buzz segments also air on the program's website, DailyBuzzTV.com, as well as through its official Facebook page.
