= Mitch English =

American television personality

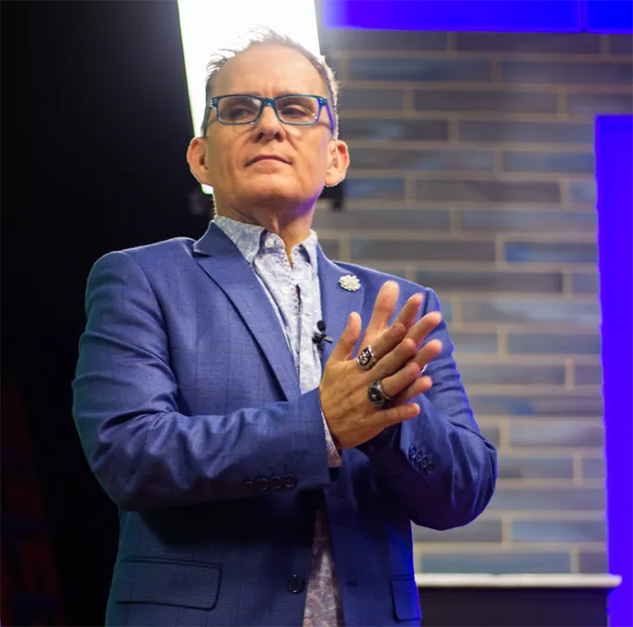
- Mitch English on the set of a television show
- Born: October 2, 1969 (age 56); Covington, Kentucky, U.S.
- Occupations: morning television talk show host, news anchor, radio host, actor, comedian, weatherman, and keynote speaker.
- Spouses: Raquel Carter (m. 1991; div. 2016) Liza Boone (m. 2023)
- Children: 5
- Website: http://www.mitchenglish.com

Mitch English (born October 2, 1969) is an American morning talk show host, radio host/personality, comedian, actor, reporter, weatherman and keynote speaker. He is best known for being the host of the nationally syndicated morning television show, The Daily Buzz from its launch in September, 2002. He currently hosts the nationally syndicated television show, The Daily Flash based in Orlando, Florida.

English's goofy, often spontaneous comedy is heavily influenced by comedian David Letterman. He also worked at WCBS-TV in New York City, filling in on-air for Dave Price.

== Career ==
=== Early career ===
Mitch began his broadcasting career with stints at several radio stations in Tampa, Florida; Biloxi, Mississippi; and Dothan, Alabama in the early 1990s and moved into television soon after. His television career began at WTVY-TV. He was later hired at KUWB-TV in Salt Lake City, Utah. English also worked on The Freak Show with Mick and Allen on KURR in Utah at the same time, but left radio to concentrate on the creation of the 2 1/2-hour morning TV show WB AM until 2002 when he left for national television. He was a regular guest on The Shannon Burke Show.

English received his education in meteorology from the Mississippi State University Broadcast Meteorology Program. He does not go by the title of "meteorologist" and has consistently used the title of "weather anchor".

=== The Daily Buzz ===
In September 2002, English became the co-host and weather anchor for the nationally syndicated morning television show, The Daily Buzz. He was the last remaining original anchor on the program, having started on the show when it launched. English left the show in June, 2012.

=== Recent years ===
English became Executive Producer of Good Morning San Diego at television station KUSI-TV in 2013 before moving on to an on-air position as Morning news anchor at FOX affiliate KOKH-TV in Oklahoma City, Oklahoma in 2015. During his tenure, he moved on to co-host the station's lifestyle show, Living Oklahoma. English left the station in February 2019 to become co-host of the nationally syndicated television show Daily Flash, with studios located in Orlando, Florida

=== Broadway & Friends ===
In July 2021, it was announced on the Bud & Broadway Show that English would become permanent co-host of the radio program. English replaced Bud Ford who unexpectedly departed from the show a few months prior. The radio show is nationally syndicated on 40+ commercial radio stations throughout the United States and is based in Nashville, Tennessee. English does his portion of the show remotely from his studio in Orlando, Florida. He goes by a self-given nickname "Pancake" on the show, but has never explained why he wanted to be referred to as such other than the fact that the other hosts had nicknames of their own.

The show has since seen tremendous gains in audience and accolades, having won the Academy of Country Music's coveted National Daily On-Air Personality of the Year for 2022. In January 2023 the show rebranded the name to "Broadway and Friends" and has since grown to 2 dozen+ affiliates with more stations expected to sign on within the year.

=== Outside of broadcasting ===
English has also acted in several television shows and theatrical releases. He is also a stand-up comedian, traveling the country with his Daily Buzz co-host Andy Campbell on the "Big and Tall Comedy Tour". He's also the founder of the production company Modern Cow, LLC. He is also known for his wide variety of impersonations and voice characterizations, mostly comical.

== Personal life ==
He is a father of four children. and stepfather to one child. He currently lives in Orlando, Florida.
English divorced in 2016. He later married Liza Boone, PhD in 2023, a nationally recognized nutritionist, educator and speaker.

=== Murder of his son ===
On June 28, 2019, English's second eldest son was found dead inside his home in Edmond, Oklahoma Lindsi Mayabb and George Watson are accused of murdering 24-year-old Andrew Sawyer English; shooting him in the back multiple times through a window of his home. Mayabb accepted a plea deal to testify against her boyfriend, agreeing to spend 10 years in prison and serve 10 years of probation in exchange for her testimony. Watson pleaded not guilty to murder on December 6, 2019, despite Mayabb's testimony. Watson agreed to a plea deal on January 25, 2021, in an Oklahoma City, Oklahoma courtroom. Upon agreeing to the plea, Watson took responsibility for the murder in court and apologized to the family. He will serve a life/suspended sentence, meaning he will be in prison for 35 years and will not be eligible for parole until 2051. Upon his release from prison, he will serve and additional 10 years probation, thus totaling a 45-year sentence.

== Catchphrases ==
- "Rock forth™"
- "...And SO!"
- "I'll see ya when I look at ya"
- "Now here's what happening in your zipcode"
