= KASY-TV =

Television station in Albuquerque, New Mexico

ATSC 3.0 station
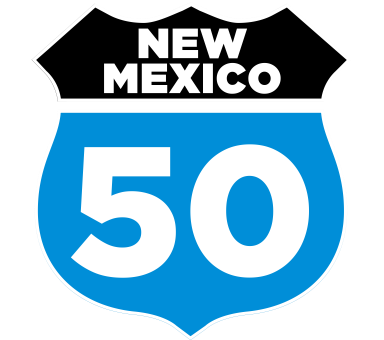
- Albuquerque–Santa Fe, New Mexico; United States
- City: Albuquerque, New Mexico
- Channels: Digital: 36 (UHF); Virtual: 50
- Branding: New Mexico 50

Programming
- Affiliations: 50.1: Independent with MyNetworkTV; for others, see § Subchannels

Ownership
- Owner: Mission Broadcasting, Inc.
- Operator: Nexstar Media Group
- Sister stations: KRQE, KWBQ

History
- Founded: July 13, 1993
- First air date: October 6, 1995
- Former channel numbers: Analog: 50 (UHF, 1995–2009); Digital: 45 (UHF, 2003–2019)
- Former affiliations: UPN (1995–1999, 2000–2006); The WB (secondary, 1995–1997); Independent (1999–2000)
- Call sign meaning: Used by 103.3 FM at the time Ramar started the station

Technical information
- Licensing authority: FCC
- Facility ID: 55049
- ERP: 205 kW
- HAAT: 1,278 m (4,193 ft)
- Transmitter coordinates: 35°12′49.8″N 106°27′3.3″W

Links
- Public license information: Public file; LMS
- Website: www.krqe.com/new-mexico-cw-my50tv/

KASY-TV (channel 50) is a television station in Albuquerque, New Mexico, United States. It is primarily programmed as an independent station, but maintains a secondary affiliation with MyNetworkTV. KASY-TV is owned by Mission Broadcasting alongside CW outlet KWBQ (channel 19); both stations are operated under a shared services agreement (SSA) by Nexstar Media Group, owner of Fox affiliate KRQE (channel 13). The four stations share studios at Broadcast Plaza in Albuquerque; KASY-TV's transmitter is located atop Sandia Crest.

== History ==
KASY-TV first signed on the air on October 6, 1995, owned by Ramar Communications and managed by Lee Enterprises (then-owners of CBS affiliate KRQE) under a local marketing agreement (LMA). The station was primarily a UPN affiliate, but had a secondary affiliation with The WB; this was easy to do as neither network had more than a couple nights a week of programming at that time. Initially, KASY ran cartoons, old movies, talk shows, and classic and recent off-network sitcoms. In fall 1997, KASY dropped WB programming and became an exclusive UPN affiliate; The WB would return to the market when upstart KWBQ signed on in March 1999 with a similar general entertainment format. In the interim, WB programming was brought in out-of-market from KTLA in Los Angeles or Chicago-based superstation WGN on Albuquerque area cable providers.

In June 1999, ACME Communications, KWBQ's owner, bought KASY from Ramar and terminated the local marketing agreement with Lee Enterprises, resulting in the creation of the first major television duopoly in the Albuquerque market. Most of the programming inventory airing on KASY was also acquired by ACME, while some of the shows that aired on KASY under the LMA remained with Lee to be broadcast on KRQE. After the sale to ACME was completed, KASY stopped rebroadcasting certain local newscasts from KRQE.

That fall, KASY dropped its UPN affiliation due to contract disputes between the network and ACME Communications (which was closely associated with UPN's rival The WB) and became an independent station. In the interim, UPN programming was brought in out-of-market from KCOP in Los Angeles on Albuquerque area cable providers, while over-the-air viewers were unable to view UPN programming. While the station was an independent (during which it was branded as "Superstation 50"), KASY broadcast movies and syndicated programming during prime time hours to replace UPN programs. By February 2000, the UPN affiliation was returned to KASY, rebranding as "UPN 50;" KCOP was then pulled from area cable systems at KASY's request.

On January 24, 2006, Time Warner and CBS Corporation announced that The WB and UPN would merge to create The CW Television Network. One month later on February 22, 2006, News Corporation announced the creation of MyNetworkTV.

KASY affiliated with MyNetworkTV on September 5, 2006, with KWBQ joining The CW two weeks later on September 18; the station was also rebranded as "My50TV" (KASY was the only ACME-owned station that was not affiliated with The CW; ACME was the third company, after Capitol Broadcasting Company and Weigel Broadcasting, to own both CW and MyNetworkTV affiliates in the same market).

KASY-TV broadcast games from the Colorado Rockies during the 2008 Major League Baseball season. Starting in the fall of 2008, KASY-TV began broadcasting several University of New Mexico Lobos men's basketball games; the contract was renewed for the 2009–10 and 2010–11 basketball seasons. On April 30, 2008, KASY-TV broadcast their first program in true high definition, the MyNetworkTV sitcom Under One Roof. On June 4, 2010, ACME Communications announced that it would enter into a shared services agreement with LIN Media; as a result, LIN's own duopoly of KASA-TV and KRQE would provide technical, engineering and accounting services for KWBQ and KASY, with the mutual operating costs shared in order to help reduce overall costs for ACME.

On September 10, 2012, ACME announced a proposed sale of KASY-TV as well as KWBQ (and its Roswell repeater, KRWB-TV) to Tamer Media, a company founded by broadcast industry veteran John S. Viall, Jr. The $17.3 million sale, which the FCC approved on November 21, and was completed on December 11, gives Tamer Media its first TV properties, while ACME makes its exit from the station ownership business (the three stations were the last portions of ACME's TV station portfolio). The stations' shared services agreement with LIN Media continued with new ownership. On March 21, 2014, Media General announced that it would purchase LIN Media and its stations, including KRQE, KASA-TV, and the SSA with KASY-TV and KWBQ/KRWB-TV, in a $1.6 billion merger. The merger was completed on December 19. Just over a year later, on January 27, 2016, it was announced that the Nexstar Broadcasting Group would buy Media General for $4.6 billion. The sale was completed on January 17, 2017.

On August 7, 2020, it was announced that Mission Broadcasting would acquire KASY and KWBQ (and its satellites) from Tamer Media. The sale was completed on November 16.

== Technical information ==
=== Subchannels ===
The station's ATSC 1.0 channels are carried on the multiplexed signals of other Albuquerque–Santa Fe television stations:

Subchannels provided by KASY-TV (ATSC 1.0)
Subchannel	Res.	Short name	Programming	ATSC 1.0 host
50.1	720p	KASY-TV	Main KASY-TV programming	KWBQ
50.2	480i	Mystery	Ion Mystery	KWBQ
50.3	480i	Get TV	Great	KRQE
50.4	480i	Court	Court TV	KRQE
50.5	480i	Antenna	Antenna TV (4:3)	KOAT-TV

KASY has not carried any subchannels in past years but on January 11, 2016, the station added the suspense channel Escape from Katz Broadcasting. KASY further added on GetTV to 50.3 on January 14, 2017, and added Cozi TV to 50.4 on January 18, 2017, all as a result of the January 2017 sale of KASA-TV to Ramar Communications, as well as the switch in Fox affiliation over to KRQE. In mid-December 2021, Cozi TV was replaced by Court TV on channel 50.4 after Cozi TV returned to KASA following the purchase by parent company NBCU. Court TV is also aired locally on KLUZ 14.4.

=== Analog-to-digital conversion ===
KASY-TV ended regular programming on its analog signal, over UHF channel 50, on June 12, 2009, the official date on which full-power television stations in the United States transitioned from analog to digital broadcasts under federal mandate. The station's digital signal remained on its pre-transition UHF channel 45, using virtual channel 50.

As part of the SAFER Act, KASY-TV kept its analog signal on the air until June 26 to inform viewers of the digital television transition through the loop of public service announcements from the National Association of Broadcasters.

=== ATSC 3.0 ===
KASY switched to ATSC 3.0 broadcasts on December 13, 2022, hosting KRQE, KWBQ and KOAT in addition to KASY.

Subchannels of KASY-TV (ATSC 3.0)
Subchannel	Res.	Short name	Programming
7.1	720p	KOAT-TV	ABC (KOAT-TV)
13.1	1080p	KRQE	Fox (KRQE)
13.2	720p	FoxNM	KRQE-DT2 (Independent)
19.1	1080p	KWBQ-TV	The CW (KWBQ)
50.1	720p	KASY TV	Main KASY-TV programming

Subchannel broadcast with digital rights management
