= ACME Communications =

American TV broadcasting company

ACME Communications Inc.
- Company type: Public
- Industry: Television Broadcasting & Production
- Founded: 1997; 29 years ago
- Defunct: December 11, 2012; 13 years ago (stations); December 31, 2016; 9 years ago (officially)
- Fate: Dissolved
- Headquarters: Santa Ana, California, United States
- Key people: Jamie Kellner (chairman); Doug Gealy (president/CEO); John Hannon EVP; Stan Gill (COO)
- Number of employees: 141

ACME Communications Inc. was a U.S.-based broadcasting company that was involved in operations of television stations and programming from the late 1990s to 2013.

== History ==
ACME Communications was co-founded by chairman and original CEO Jamie Kellner, who previously served as a Fox Broadcasting Company executive and was founding CEO of The WB Television Network. Kellner used the name ACME as a play on the fictional Acme Corporation featured in Warner Bros' Wile E. Coyote and Road Runner animated film series and other Looney Tunes media. In 2000, ACME Communications and Paramount Stations Group entered into a joint partnership. ACME stations would air three hours of UPN programming in three markets (St. Louis, Knoxville, and Champaign, Illinois) where UPN had no affiliate; WB programs would remain as on a secondary basis on Paramount stations in Columbus, Ohio, and Providence, Rhode Island that were switching to UPN, and were added to the UPN station in West Palm Beach.

The ownership portfolio of ACME Communications included television stations generally located in medium-sized U.S. media markets, all of which ACME obtained through acquisitions. All but one of ACME's stations were affiliated with The WB or converted to WB affiliation at purchase, likely playing on Kellner's previous relationship with that network. The ACME WB stations were among the first to line up affiliations with The CW Television Network when The WB and UPN amalgamated in 2006. ACME's station portfolio reached a peak of 11 stations in the early 2000s, at which time ACME also ventured into program production with the 2002 launch of The Daily Buzz, a syndicated daily morning news and information program that reached 180 markets at one point.

During the early 2010s, ACME set forth on cost-cutting efforts involving its assets and an admitted "exit strategy" from the television business, including the following:

- A licensing and consulting agreement with Fisher Communications for The Daily Buzz, announced in April 2010, that would see Fisher handle production of Buzz.
- A June 2010 agreement with LIN TV Corporation (with intent to purchase) involving stations in two markets where the companies had common ownership (Dayton, and Green Bay-Fox Cities), where the LIN stations would provide operational, administrative, and joint sales services for the ACME stations. At the same time, LIN TV also entered into an agreement to provide some services (including third-party accounting) for ACME's duopoly in Albuquerque.
- A reduction and restructuring of its corporate staff, set forth in July 2010, that would see Jamie Kellner remain as company chairman but Doug Gealy taking over Keller's titles of President and CEO. Stan Gill, Vice President and General Manager of ACME's KWBQ-KASY duopoly in Albuquerque-Santa Fe, became COO while WBDT, Dayton, Ohio, Vice President and General Manager John Hannon was elevated to ACME's Executive Vice President.
- The sales of its last remaining stations: single stations in Dayton, Green Bay, Knoxville (all 3 in sales consummated in Spring 2011), and Madison (a February 2012 sale); as well as an Albuquerque/Santa Fe duopoly (September 2012).
- The sale of The Daily Buzz to Mojo Brands Media in April 2013, which left ACME with no remaining broadcast assets and put the company into a closedown mode; ACME officially folded operations once it closed its outstanding accounts in December 2016. The Daily Buzz itself was abruptly canceled April 17, 2015, when a Mojo Brands investor pulled their funding for the series.

== Programming ==
- The Daily Buzz, a 3-hour-per-weekday morning news and information program geared towards young adult audiences. The show launched in 2002 from the studios of ACME-owned WBDT in Dayton, and from 2007 onward would originate from the studios of Full Sail University in Winter Park, Florida. The show was sold to Mojo Brands Media in April 2013, and was cancelled in April 2015. The show was revived in June 2017, but is now broadcast weekly.

== Former stations ==
- Stations are arranged in alphabetical order by state and city of license.

Stations owned by ACME Communications
Media market	State	Station	Purchased	Sold	Notes
Fort Myers–Naples	Florida	WTVK	1998	2007	
Springfield	Illinois	WBUI	1999	2007	
St. Louis	Missouri	KPLR-TV	1997	2003	
Albuquerque–Santa Fe	New Mexico	KWBQ	1999	2012	
Albuquerque–Santa Fe	New Mexico	KASY-TV	2000	2012	
Roswell	New Mexico	KRWB-TV	1999	2012	(Note: Satellite of KWBQ.)
Springfield–Dayton	Ohio	WBDT	1999	2011	
Portland	Oregon	KWBP	1997	2003	
Knoxville	Tennessee	WBXX-TV	1997	2011	
Salt Lake City	Utah	KUWB	1999	2006	
Green Bay	Wisconsin	WIWB	1999	2011	(Note: Known as WCWF from 2010 onward.)
Madison	Wisconsin	WBUW	2002	2012	
