= KWBQ =

Television station in Santa Fe, New Mexico

KWBQ and KRWB-TV

KWBQ: Santa Fe–Albuquerque, New Mexico; KRWB-TV: Roswell, New Mexico; United States
- Channels for KWBQ: Digital: 29 (UHF); Virtual: 19
- Channels for KRWB-TV: Digital: 21 (UHF); Virtual: 21
- Branding: New Mexico CW

Programming
- Affiliations: 19.1/21.1: The CW; 21.2: MyNetworkTV; for others, see § KWBQ subchannels

Ownership
- Owner: Mission Broadcasting, Inc.
- Operator: Nexstar Media Group via SSA
- Sister stations: KRQE, KASY-TV

History
- Founded: KWBQ: April 11, 1997; KRWB-TV: February 4, 2003
- First air date: KWBQ: March 5, 1999; KRWB-TV: February 18, 2003
- Former channel number: KWBQ: Analog: 19 (UHF, 1999–2009); KRWB-TV: Analog: 21 (UHF, 2003–2009)
- Former affiliations: KWBQ: The WB (1999–2006); KRWB-TV: The WB (2003–2006)
- Call sign meaning: KWBQ: The WB Albuquerque; KRWB-TV: Roswell's WB

Technical information
- Licensing authority: FCC
- Facility ID: KWBQ: 76268; KRWB-TV: 84157
- ERP: KWBQ: 245 kW; KRWB-TV: 1,000 kW
- HAAT: KWBQ: 1,275 m (4,183 ft); KRWB-TV: 128 m (420 ft)
- Transmitter coordinates: KWBQ: 35°12′49.8″N 106°27′3.3″W; KRWB-TV: 33°6′1″N 104°15′18″W
- Translator: K24CT-D Alamogordo

Links
- Public license information: KWBQ: Public file; LMS; KRWB-TV: Public file; LMS
- Website: www.krqe.com/new-mexicos-cw/

KWBQ (channel 19) is a television station licensed to Santa Fe, New Mexico, United States, serving as the Albuquerque area's outlet for The CW. It is owned by Mission Broadcasting alongside KASY-TV (channel 50), an independent station with MyNetworkTV; both stations are operated under a shared services agreement (SSA) by Nexstar Media Group, owner of Fox affiliate KRQE (channel 13). The four stations share studios at Broadcast Plaza in Albuquerque; KWBQ's transmitter is located atop Sandia Crest.

KRWB-TV (channel 21) in Roswell operates as a satellite of KWBQ, extending its signal across southeastern New Mexico. This station's transmitter is located near Hagerman. KRWB is a straight simulcast of KWBQ; on-air references to KRWB are limited to Federal Communications Commission (FCC)-mandated hourly station identifications during programming. Besides the transmitter, KRWB does not maintain any physical presence in Roswell. Unlike its parent station, KRWB does not carry any of KWBQ's subchannels, but does carry KASY-TV on its second subchannel.

== History ==
KWBQ commenced operations on March 5, 1999, as an affiliate of The WB, bringing that network's programming back to the market two years after then-UPN affiliate KASY-TV dropped its secondary affiliation with the network after a two-year run in 1997. The station was originally branded as "WB19" at sign-on, before it was later changed to "New Mexico's WB" in 2002. ACME Communications would purchase KASY from Ramar Communications in June 1999, a deal that resulted in the formation of Albuquerque's first major television duopoly and the termination of KASY's local marketing agreement with Lee Enterprises (then-owners of CBS affiliate KRQE). In February 2003, KWBQ signed on Roswell-licensed satellite station KRWB-TV on UHF channel 21 to extend KWBQ's broadcast signal into southeastern New Mexico. This partially filled a gap that was created in January 2002 when the network's El Paso affiliate, KKWB, switched its affiliation to TeleFutura; as a result, the network's programming would only be available on cable in the El Paso market via Los Angeles superstation KTLA for the remainder of its run.

On January 24, 2006, Time Warner's Warner Bros. Entertainment unit and CBS Corporation announced that the two companies would merge the operations of The WB and UPN, which the companies respectively owned, into a joint venture called The CW Television Network. On March 9 of that year, ACME Communications signed an affiliation agreement with the network for KWBQ and its KRWB satellite to join The CW upon the network's September 18 launch, while KASY would join another new service, the Fox Entertainment Group-owned MyNetworkTV, upon its September 5, 2006, launch. The deals made ACME the third station group, after Capitol Broadcasting Company (WJZY-WMYT-TV in Charlotte) and Weigel Broadcasting (WCWW-LP-WMYS-LP in South Bend) to have duopolies affiliated with both The CW and MyNetworkTV. In September 2006, KWBQ and KRWB were rebranded as "New Mexico's CW" to reflect their new affiliation. At that time, the station created a new mascot dubbed "The CW Guy" (designed basically as an anthropomorphic television with arms and legs and The CW's logo on its screen) to serve as a promotional tool at local station events; "The CW Guy" served as a replacement for The WB's former mascot Michigan J. Frog.

On June 4, 2010, ACME announced it would enter into a shared services agreement (SSA) with LIN Media; as a result, LIN's own duopoly of KASA-TV and KRQE would provide technical, engineering and accounting services for KWBQ and KASY, with the mutual operating costs shared in order to help reduce overall costs for ACME.

On September 10, 2012, ACME announced a proposed sale of KWBQ and KRWB-TV, as well as KASY-TV, to Tamer Media, a company founded by broadcast industry veteran John S. Viall, Jr. The $17.3 million sale, which the FCC approved on November 21, and was completed on December 11, gave Tamer Media its first TV properties, while ACME exited from the station ownership business (the three stations were the last portions of ACME's TV station portfolio). The stations' shared services agreement with LIN Media would continue under new ownership.

On March 21, 2014, Media General announced that it would purchase LIN Media and its stations, including KRQE, KASA-TV, and the SSA with KWBQ/KRWB-TV and KASY-TV, in a $1.6 billion merger. The merger was completed on December 19. Just over a year later, on January 27, 2016, it was announced that the Nexstar Broadcasting Group would buy Media General for $4.6 billion. The sale was completed on January 17, 2017.

On August 7, 2020, it was announced that Mission Broadcasting would acquire KWBQ and its satellites and KASY-TV from Tamer Media. The sale was completed on November 16.

== Newscasts ==
Starting in April 2015, KWBQ began to simulcast KRQE's morning newscast, including the later Fox New Mexico half of the show, from 4:30 to 9 a.m. It airs the Fox New Mexico (KRQE-DT2) program New Mexico Living from 10 to 11 a.m.

== Technical information ==
The stations' signals are multiplexed:

=== KWBQ subchannels ===
Subchannels of KWBQ
Subchannel	Res.	Short name	Programming
19.1	1080i	KWBQ-TV	The CW
19.2	480i	Grit	Grit
19.3	480i	Laff	Laff
19.4	480i	Outlaw	Outlaw
19.5	480i	Rewind	Rewind TV
50.1	720p	KASY-TV	KASY-TV (Independent with MyNetworkTV)
50.2	480i	Mystery	Ion Mystery (KASY-TV)

Broadcast on behalf of another station

=== KRWB-TV subchannels ===
Subchannels of KRWB-TV
Subchannel	Res.	Short name	Programming
21.1	1080i	KRWB-HD	The CW
21.2	720p	KASY-HD	KASY-TV (Independent with MyNetworkTV)

Simulcast of subchannels of another station

KWBQ has not carried any subchannels in past years but on January 11, 2016, the station added the action/western channel Grit and comedy channel Laff from Katz Broadcasting. Laff further adds to KWBQ's identity as a station for comedy while Grit and Ion add some programming diversity to the signal. KWBQ further added Ion Television to 19.4 on January 18, 2017, due to the January 2017 sale of KASA-TV to Ramar Communications, as well as the switch in Fox affiliation over to KRQE. On September 1, 2021, KWBQ added Nexstar-owned Rewind TV as a fifth subchannel.

=== Analog-to-digital conversion ===
Both stations ended regular programming on their analog signals on June 12, 2009, the official date on which full-power television stations in the United States transitioned from analog to digital broadcasts under federal mandate.

- KWBQ ended regular programming on its analog signal, over UHF channel 19; the station's digital signal remained on its pre-transition UHF channel 29, using virtual channel 19.
- KRWB-TV shut down its analog signal, over UHF channel 21, and "flash-cut" its digital signal into operation on the same channel.

As part of the SAFER Act, KWBQ kept its analog signal on the air until June 26 to inform viewers of the digital television transition through a loop of public service announcements from the National Association of Broadcasters.
