= Jamie Kellner =

American television executive (1947–2024)

- Born: James Charles Kellner; April 18, 1947; New York City, U.S.
- Died: June 21, 2024 (aged 77); Montecito, California, U.S.
- Occupation: Television executive
- Years active: 1970s–2016
- Spouse: Julie Smith
- Children: 2

James Charles Kellner (April 18, 1947 – June 21, 2024) was an American television executive. He was a founding president of Fox Broadcasting and founded The WB network. Kellner was chairman and CEO of Turner Broadcasting System, Inc., a division of Time Warner which includes TBS, TNT, and Cartoon Network from 2001 to 2003. He was the chairman of station ownership group ACME Communications, a post held from the company's founding until its folding in 2016.

== Early life and education ==
Kellner was born on April 18, 1947, to an Irish Catholic family in Brooklyn and grew up on Long Island, New York.

== Career ==
After college he participated in the CBS Executive Training Program; after CBS disposed of its syndication division, he rose to the rank of vice president for first-run programming, development, and sales at Viacom. In 1978, he accepted a job as executive of Filmways, a film and television producer and distributor.

In 1982, after Filmways was taken over by Orion Pictures, he served as president of its Orion Entertainment Group, where he oversaw and supervised their programming and syndication activities, including the launch of Cagney and Lacey.

=== Fox Broadcasting Company ===
In 1986, when News Corp. chairman and Fox owner Rupert Murdoch and Fox Inc. chairman Barry Diller made the decision to create a fourth television network to compete with the big three, Kellner would be the first executive hired by Diller to develop this new network. At Fox, Kellner was charged with building the affiliate network, selling programming to advertisers, and the establishment of relations with program producers. During the early days of Fox, Kellner and Diller were regarded as the two people having the most oversight of the network's programming.

Kellner was present at the establishment of the Fox Broadcasting Company and held the position as chairman of 20th Century Fox Television from 1986 to 1993. Among the shows that emerged during Kellner's seven years at Fox were The Simpsons, Married... with Children, Beverly Hills, 90210, Melrose Place and In Living Color. Those shows held the fledgling "web" together until Fox shocked the television world by winning partial rights to the National Football League (NFL) in 1994 from CBS; that, as well as channel upgrades in many markets due to Fox's alliance and merger with New World Communications, made Fox a legitimate fourth network. Kellner resigned from Fox in January 1993, departing one year after Diller also departed from the company.

=== WB Television Network ===
Kellner then spent seven years at the helm of the WB Television Network. He helped launch the new broadcast network in 1994. During his tenure, Kellner began by championing urban sitcoms, but eventually steered The WB in the direction of teen and family-oriented dramas. 7th Heaven, Buffy the Vampire Slayer, Gilmore Girls, Dawson's Creek, Felicity and Charmed all premiered during Kellner's presidency.

=== Turner Broadcasting System ===
Kellner was made head of Turner Broadcasting System in 2000, officially succeeding Ted Turner in March 2001. He was ultimately the one who made the decision to cancel World Championship Wrestling (WCW) programming on Turner's networks in 2001. The once-powerful WCW was the largest wrestling promotion in the world popularity-wise in the mid-1990s, beating its rival, the World Wrestling Federation (WWF, now known as WWE) head-to-head on Monday nights for 83 consecutive weeks from 1996 to 1998. By 2001, it was declining, and lost roughly $60 million in 2000. With WCW no longer being profitable, and AOL Time Warner (WCW's parent company) wanting nothing to do with WCW further (desiring to move in a different direction), Kellner canceled all WCW programming on TBS and TNT. This left WCW without a television contract, and hastened the eventual sale of its assets to World Wrestling Federation Entertainment.

In the book The Death of WCW by Bryan Alvarez and RD Reynolds, Kellner was listed as the official "killer" of WCW, insofar as he made the official call to remove it from the Turner networks. Contrary to popular belief, Kellner did not cancel WCW due to a dislike of professional wrestling. In Guy Evans's book NITRO: The Incredible Rise and Inevitable Collapse of Ted Turner's WCW, Kellner explained "I grew up a fan of wrestling, and once tried to make a deal with Vince McMahon at a different network." Rather, it was a key condition in WCW's purchase deal with Fusient Media Ventures — Fusient wanted control over time slots on TNT and TBS, regardless of whether these slots would show WCW programming or not — that influenced Kellner's decision to ultimately cancel WCW programming. WCW's losses were then written-off via purchase accounting; according to Evans: "in the post-merger environment, the new conglomerate was able to 'write down' money losing operations, essentially eliminating those losses because of their irrelevancy moving forward."

== Personal life ==
Kellner and his wife, Julie, had one child, and he also had a daughter from his previous marriage. Kellner died from cancer on June 21, 2024, in Montecito, California, at the age of 77.

== Sources ==
- The Death of WCW, by R.D. Reynolds and Bryan Alvarez. New York: ECW Press (not related to Extreme Championship Wrestling), 2005; ISBN 1-55022-661-4
- Appearances on C-SPAN
