= Without Warning (1994 film) =

1994 American television film

- DVD cover
- Genre: Science fiction; Docufiction
- Teleplay by: Peter Lance
- Story by: Peter Lance; Jeremy Thorn; Walon Green
- Directed by: Robert Iscove
- Starring: Sander Vanocur; Jane Kaczmarek; Bree Walker; Dwier Brown; Brian McNamara; James Morrison
- Music by: Craig Safan
- Country of origin: United States
- Original language: English

Production
- Executive producers: David L. Wolper; Mark Wolper
- Producers: Robert Iscove; Nancy Platt Jacoby
- Cinematography: John Beymer
- Editors: Martin Nicholson; Fred Peterson
- Running time: 100 minutes
- Production companies: The Wolper Organization; Mountain View Productions; Warner Bros. Television

Original release
- Network: CBS
- Release: October 30, 1994

Without Warning (also known as July 13th) is an American television film directed by Robert Iscove. It follows a duo of real-life reporters covering breaking news about three meteor fragments crashing into the Northern Hemisphere. It aired on CBS on October 30, 1994, and is presented as if it were an actual breaking news event, shot on videotape and complete with remote reports from reporters. The executive producer was David L. Wolper, who produced a number of mockumentary-style films since the 1960s. The movie was heavily influenced by Orson Welles' 1938 The War of the Worlds radio broadcast.

== Plot ==
The broadcast of a murder mystery film starring Loni Anderson, titled Without Warning, is interrupted with a news bulletin of a series of three earthquakes, one of them located in the Thunder Basin National Grassland area of Wyoming. The film resumes but a few moments later is interrupted for good as coverage, led by Sander Vanocur and Dr. Caroline Jaffe, begins of a worldwide impact event. Three impacts were observed, all along the 45th parallel north in remote areas: one in Wyoming, one in southern France and one in the Gobi Desert in China. Lone survivors are found at the Wyoming and France impact sites, a girl and a young man, respectively. Both survivors are badly burned and their speech is unintelligible.

NASA determines that the three impacts originated from 6645 Venturi, an asteroid that approached Earth directly over the North Pole before fragmenting in 45-degree separations. The three impact sites begin broadcasting an ear-piercing radio signal that cripples aircraft flying near the 45th parallel. Another large asteroid is detected moving towards the North Pole in an identical trajectory to 6645 Venturi. The United States, with consent from world leaders but disagreement from scientists, orders two F-16s to destroy the asteroid with low-yield nuclear weapons. The destruction is successful, though the attacking aircraft are brought down by another radio signal shortly before the asteroid's destruction. All of the mysterious radio signals suddenly cease. At the same time, a power surge is detected in the devoutly religious community of Faith, Wyoming, less than fifty miles from the Thunder Basin impact site. Repair crews sent to investigate discover that the citizens have all vanished without a trace.

Scientist Dr. Avram Mandel, who has been studying the impacts, is flown by an F-16 to NASA's Johnson Space Center in Houston, where reporters are being briefed on the latest incident. He reveals his determinations: the impacts were an attempt at first contact by an extraterrestrial species; the radio signal was a transponder to help steer a follow-up vehicle; and, by destroying the follow-up vehicle, Earth has inadvertently declared war. The two survivors, Kimberly Hastings and Jean-Paul Chounard, succumb to their wounds. A colleague of Mandel, Dr. Robert Pearlman, links 6645 Venturi's fragmentation pattern to an identical shape present on Pioneer 11's pioneer plaque.

Mandel resigns from NASA and reveals to reporters that three more asteroids, each at least two miles wide, will soon impact Washington, Moscow and Beijing, the capital cities of the only three nations capable of first-strike nuclear warfare. The radio signals begin again. Two nuclear weapons are launched from the USS Ohio to intercept the Beijing and Moscow asteroids, while a third nuclear weapon is launched from F.E. Warren Air Force Base to destroy the Washington asteroid. All three are successful and celebrations break out, but the radio signals do not cease.

Chounard and Hastings' speech is aired on the broadcast in stereo, and Vanocur recognizes the combined speech as "one hundred and forty seven member states", a recital of the message from the U.N. Secretary General included on the Voyager Golden Record aboard Voyager 2. The celebrations halt as, moments later, NASA detects hundreds more asteroids heading towards Earth all at once. As a stunned Vanocur and Jaffe react to reports of cities being destroyed worldwide, Vanocur solemnly quotes from William Shakespeare, "The fault, dear Brutus, lies not in our stars, but in ourselves," before a rumble is heard and the picture cuts to static.

== Cast ==
- Sander Vanocur as Himself
- Jane Kaczmarek as Dr. Caroline Jaffe
- Bree Walker as Herself
- Dwier Brown as Matt Jensen
- Brian McNamara as Mike Curtis
- James Morrison as Paul Whitaker
- Ashley Peldon as Kimberly Hastings
- James Handy as Dr. Norbert Hazelton
- Kario Salem as Dr. Avram Mandel
- Spencer Garrett as Paul Collingwood
- Gina Hecht as Barbara Shiller
- John de Lancie as Barry Steinbrenner
- Patty Toy as Denise Wong
- Dennis Lipscomb as Dr. Robert Pearlman
- Ron Canada as Terrence Freeman
- Victor Wilson as Mark Manetti
- John M. Jackson as Dale Powell
- Ernie Anastos as Himself
- Philip Baker Hall as Dr. Kurt Lowden
- Jim Pirri as Robert Marino
- Alan Scarfe as General Lucian Alexander
- Cynthia Allison as Herself
- Arthur C. Clarke as Himself
- Sandy Hill as Herself
- Michelle Holden as Herself
- Mario Machado as Himself
- Warren Olney as Himself
- Saida Pagan as Herself
- Richard Saxton as Himself
- Debra Snell as Herself

=== Co-starring ===
- Randy Crowder as Deputy Anson Peters
- Frank Bruynbroek as Jean-Paul Chounard
- Diana Frank as Sylvie Chounard
- Marnie McPhail as Donna Hastings
- Sherri Paysinger as Pamela Barnes
- Robert Peters as Dwayne Haskell
- Lou Beatty Jr. as Dr. Jonas Tremblay
- John DeMita as Major Powers
- Tyler Cole Malinger as Tyler O'Neal
- Marnie Mosiman as Annie O'Neal
- Armand Schultz as David Case

Additionally, Loni Anderson and Ed Marinaro appear uncredited at the beginning of the film in the fictional murder mystery TV movie that gets "interrupted" by the broadcast.

== Production ==
The film employed "accelerated time" (i.e. events said to have taken place an hour apart actually take place a few minutes apart), among other storytelling devices to make it clear to viewers paying attention that it was not real, including the mention of the year's G7 Summit, which had already come and gone three months before the film released. This, combined with the casting of Jane Kaczmarek, a recognizable actress, as well as several other well-known performers in secondary roles (Star Trek: The Next Generation guest star John de Lancie as a reporter and Philip Baker Hall as one of the doctors in the space station), was expected to alleviate any concerns that the story being shown was actually happening. Ron Canada, who appeared in the film as a science author being interviewed by Sander Vanocur, had previously worked as a television news reporter for stations in Baltimore and Washington, D.C. during the 1970s before becoming an actor. However, the casting of noted (albeit retired) news anchor Vanocur and noted journalist Bree Walker (who had previously anchored for Los Angeles CBS O&O station KCBS-TV) in major roles portraying themselves, plus a faux interview with noted author Arthur C. Clarke, still left some viewers wondering.

== Broadcast ==
During the film's broadcast, CBS had warnings during the commercial breaks stating that the film was completely fictional, and that the events were not actually happening. Some CBS affiliates, such as KHOU in Houston, had similar warnings in the form of a news ticker "crawl" during the broadcast. The producers used actual CBS News graphics to help accentuate the feeling that it was real (though they used a different network logo, a sphere within an outline of a TV screen), however, leading to at least one uproar over the events. In Fort Smith, Arkansas, the CBS affiliate (KFSM-TV) reported that they had received dozens of calls regarding the incident and whether it was actually happening. The area's ABC, Fox, and NBC affiliates (respectively KHBS, KPBI and KPOM-TV) were also flooded with complaints, asking them why they were not covering this event at the same time that CBS was covering it. In several other markets, including Detroit, Michigan, and San Diego, California, the local CBS affiliates (respectively, WJBK, which would switch to Fox six weeks later, and KFMB-TV) refused to air this TV movie.

Some accused CBS of being irresponsible in showing the movie during the primetime hours, when some children were still out trick-or-treating (even though the movie actually aired the night before Halloween). Indeed, the film explicitly takes place on October 31, with trick or treaters featured in several news reports within, but very few occasions have happened since Orson Welles' 1938 The War of the Worlds radio broadcast (which also aired on October 30) that so many people have been taken in by a production such as Without Warning. The film borrowed one of the locations from Welles' broadcast. Welles used the village of Grover's Mill, New Jersey, as the first landing site of the Martians in his tale. Without Warning uses the fictional town of Grover's Mill, Wyoming, as a homage to Welles' broadcast, and the original broadcast was preceded by a brief prologue referencing the War of the Worlds broadcast, with the narrator reiterating that the film about to be shown was fiction and presented in the same spirit.

== Other releases and home media ==
The film was released on DVD on July 8, 2003, nearly nine years after its initial, and only, showing on CBS.

== See also ==
- Special Bulletin (1983) - a similar faux newscast TV movie, about a nuclear terrorism incident
- Ghostwatch (1992)
