= KFTA-TV/KNWA-TV =

KFTA/KNWA may refer to:

- KFTA-TV, a television station (channel 24 analog/27 digital) licensed to Fort Smith, Arkansas, United States
- KNWA-TV, a television station (channel 51) licensed to Rogers, Arkansas, United States
