= KPBI =

KPBI may refer to:

- KPBI (AM), a radio station (1250 kHz) licensed to serve Fayetteville, Arkansas, United States
- KPBI-CD, a low-power television station (channel 35, virtual 14) licensed to serve Bentonville, Arkansas, United States
- KPBI-CA, a defunct low-power television station (channel 46) formerly licensed to serve Fort Smith, Arkansas
- KXNW, a television station (channel 34) licensed to serve Eureka Springs, Arkansas, which held the call sign KPBI from 2006 to 2012
- President Donald J. Trump International Airport (former ICAO code KPBI)
