= 1969 in American television =

This is a list of American television-related events in 1969.

== Events ==
Date	Event	Ref.
January 4	The Huntley–Brinkley Report, NBC's nightly newscast, expands to include a weekend edition that would air on Saturdays, with Chet Huntley and David Brinkley alternating weeks anchoring the news solo. Later, mediocre ratings prompt NBC to replace the duo with other newsmen, with the broadcast's Saturday editions renamed the NBC Saturday News.	
January 13	Dick York collapses on the set of Bewitched and is rushed to the hospital. He resigns from the show for health reasons. The character Darrin Stephens is played by Dick Sargent from then until the show's 1972 ending.	
February 5	ABC runs the one and only airing of the notorious flop Turn-On, which was canceled after only one episode.	
February 19	Gomer Pyle, U.S.M.C. shoots its final scene and completes its run at approximately 4:31 p.m. at the CBS Studio Center. The final scene wrapped up with Jim Nabors saying the line “How interesting - and did she?”.	
June 3	The science fiction television series Star Trek airs its final new episode after being canceled by NBC. Its subsequent sale into rerun syndication soon after leads to a rise in popularity that transforms Star Trek into one of the century's most successful entertainment franchises, which would later spawn sequel series for the next few decades.	
July 20	All three commercial television networks broadcast a live transmission from the Moon, which was viewed by 720 million people around the world, with the landing of Apollo 11; at 10:56 p.m. EDT Neil Armstrong (followed soon afterwards by Buzz Aldrin) steps onto the surface; viewers see a scan from broadcasts received at Honeysuckle Creek Tracking Station followed by Parkes Observatory in Australia.	
September 8	Starting September 8, all daytime programming on both ABC and CBS is presented in color.	
September 26	ABC affiliate WLTV in Bowling Green, Kentucky was knocked off the air due to the sabotaging explosion of their transmitter by a local bootlegger who did not appreciate the television exposure of his bootlegging ring. The station returned to the air with limited power on October 6. It would not return to full power until the station's new transmitter facility was activated in 1971.	
October 18	The Jackson 5 make their national television debut on The Hollywood Palace.	
November 13	Vice President Spiro Agnew, in a televised speech from Des Moines, Iowa, stirs up a national controversy by attacking the network news commentaries.	
December 7	The now-iconic Christmas television special, Frosty the Snowman, premieres on CBS, based on the song of the same name. The special has aired annually on the same network ever since.	

== Television programs ==
=== Debuts ===
Date	Debut	Network
February 7	This Is Tom Jones	ABC
April 10	Peanuts	CBS
April 27	The Dudley Do-Right Show	ABC
June 7	The Johnny Cash Show	ABC
June 15	Hee Haw	CBS
September 6	H.R. Pufnstuf	NBC
September 8	Where the Heart Is	CBS
September 13	The Archie Comedy Hour	CBS
September 13	Dastardly and Muttley in Their Flying Machines	CBS
September 13	The Perils of Penelope Pitstop	CBS
September 13	Scooby-Doo, Where Are You!	CBS
September 17	The Courtship of Eddie's Father	ABC
September 17	Room 222	ABC
September 23	Marcus Welby, M.D.	ABC
September 24	Medical Center	CBS
September 26	The Brady Bunch	ABC
September 29	Bright Promise	NBC
September 29	Love, American Style	ABC
November 10	Sesame Street	NET

=== Television films and specials ===
First aired	Title	Network	Reference
February 9	A Midsummer Night's Dream	CBS	
April 11	Fellini, a Director's Notebook	NBC	
April 13	Dick Van Dyke and the Other Woman	CBS	
September 27	It Was a Short Summer, Charlie Brown	CBS	
November 12	Hey, Hey, Hey, It's Fat Albert	NBC	
December 7	Frosty the Snowman	CBS	
December 12	The Archies' Sugar Sugar Jingle Jangle Christmas Show	CBS	

=== Changes of network affiliation ===
Show	Moved from	Moved to
Get Smart	NBC	CBS
The Ghost & Mrs. Muir	NBC	ABC

=== Ending this year ===
Date	Show	Network	Debut	Status	Notes
January 4	Fantastic Voyage	ABC	September 14, 1968	Ended	
January 4	The Adventures of Gulliver	ABC	September 14, 1968	Ended	
January 4	The Archie Show	ABC	September 14, 1968	Ended	
January 4	Wacky Races (returned in 2017)	CBS	September 14, 1968	Canceled	Returned in 2017 on Boomerang’s video-on-demand service
January 9	Blondie	CBS	September 26, 1968	Ended	
January 11	Danger Island	NBC	September 7, 1968	Ended	
January 15	Daktari	CBS	January 11, 1966	Ended	
January 30	Journey to the Unknown	ABC	September 26, 1968	Ended	
January 30	The Ugliest Girl in Town	ABC	September 26, 1968	Ended	
January 31	The Felony Squad	ABC	September 12, 1966	Ended	
February 23	The New Adventures of Huckleberry Finn	ABC	September 15, 1968	Ended	
March 25	N.Y.P.D	ABC	1967	Ended	
April 1	That's Life	ABC	September 24, 1968	Ended	
April 13	The Mothers-in-Law	NBC	September 10, 1967	Ended	
April 16	The Outsider	ABC	September 18, 1968	Ended	
May 2	Gomer Pyle, U.S.M.C.	CBS	September 25, 1964	Ended	
May 5	The Outcasts	ABC	September 23, 1968	Ended	
May 19	The Big Valley	ABC	September 15, 1965	Ended	
May 27	The Jerry Lewis Show	NBC	September 12, 1967	Ended	
June 2	Peyton Place	ABC	September 15, 1964	Ended	
June 3	Star Trek: The Original Series	NBC	September 8, 1966	Ended	
June 8	The Smothers Brothers Comedy Hour	CBS	February 5, 1967	Canceled	
June 8	Peanuts	CBS	1969	Canceled	Returned in 1973
August 31	The King Kong Show	ABC	September 10, 1966	Ended	
September 6	The Lone Ranger	CBS	September 10, 1966	Ended	
September 6	Journey to the Center of the Earth	ABC	September 9, 1967	Ended	
September 16	The Guns of Will Sonnett	ABC	September 8, 1967	Ended	
September 26	Eye Guess	NBC	January 3, 1966	Ended	
September 26	Match Game	NBC	December 31, 1962	Ended	Returned in 1973 on CBS
September 26	You Don't Say	NBC	April 1, 1963	Ended	Returned in 1975 on ABC
December 26	The Joey Bishop Show	ABC	April 17, 1967	Ended	
December 27	H.R. Pufnstuf	NBC	January 6, 1968	Ended	

== Networks and services ==
=== Network launches ===
Network	Type	Launch date	Notes	Source
West Virginia Public Broadcasting	Regional over-the-air state network	July 14		
Faith Broadcasting Network	Religious television network	October 1	Operated on a limited number of station in California	
Maryland Center for Public Broadcasting	Regional over-the-air state network	October 5		
UA-Columbia MSG	Cable	October 15	New York City-area-based cable channel.	
Catholic Faith Network	Regional religious cable television network	Unknown date	Possibly the earliest-known religious-formatted cable channel	

== Television stations ==
=== Sign-ons ===
Date	City of license/Market	Station	Channel	Affiliation	Notes/Ref.
January 13	Pikeville, Kentucky	WKPI-TV	22	NET	Part of the Kentucky Educational Television network as a satellite of WKLE/Lexington, Kentucky.
January 14	Garden City, New York (New York City)	WLIW	21	NET	
January 25	Monterey, California	KMST	46	CBS	
February 8	Fayetteville, Arkansas	KGTO-TV	36	NBC	
February 23	Morgantown, West Virginia	WNPB	24	NET	Later became part of the West Virginia Public Broadcasting television network
March 3	Bloomington, Indiana	WTIU	30	NET	
April 14	Eureka, California	KEET	13	NET	
June 8	St. Louis, Missouri	KDNL-TV	30	Independent	now an ABC affiliate
July 14	Huntington, West Virginia	WVPB-TV	33	NET	Part of the West Virginia Public Broadcasting television network
July 30	Nacogdoches, Texas	KAEC-TV	19	CBS	
August 18	Jacksonville, Illinois (Quincy, Illinois/Hannibal, Missouri)	WJJY-TV	14	ABC	
August 20	Kingsport, Tennessee (Johnson City/Bristol, TN-VA)	WKPT-TV	19	ABC	
August 29	Miles City/Billings, Montana	KYUS-TV	3	Independent	
September 8	Covington, Kentucky (Cincinnati, Ohio)	WCVN-TV	52	NET	Part of Kentucky Educational Television (KET) as a satellite of WKLE/Lexington
October	Manchester, New Hampshire	WXPO-TV	50	Independent	
October 1	Victoria, Texas	KXIX	19	ABC	Signed on as a satellite of KIII/Corpus Christi
October 5	Baltimore, Maryland	WMPB	67	NET	Flagship of Maryland Center for Public Broadcasting
October 7	Marquette, Michigan	WJMN-TV	3	NBC	
October 16	San Bernardino/Los Angeles, California	KHOF-TV	30	Independent	Originally licensed in Glendale, California
October 20	Hazard, Kentucky	WKYH-TV	57	Independent	
October 25	Williston, North Dakota	KXMD-TV	11	CBS (primary); ABC (secondary)	
October 26	Anniston, Alabama	WHMA-TV	40	CBS (primary); NBC (secondary)	
October 29	Kansas City, Missouri	KCIT-TV	50	Independent	
November 19	Elmira, New York	WENY-TV	36	ABC	

=== Network affiliation changes ===
Date	City of license/Market	Station	Channel	Old affiliation	New affiliation	Notes/Ref.
January	Jamestown-Buffalo, New York	WNYP-TV	26	CTV (Canada)	Independent	
January 1	Billings, Montana	KULR-TV	8	NBC (primary); ABC (secondary)	ABC (exclusive)	Would re-join NBC in 1987
January 1	Lubbock, Texas	KCBD	11	NBC (primary); ABC (secondary)	NBC (exclusive)	
January 1	Lubbock, Texas	KDUB-TV	13	CBS (primary); ABC (secondary)	CBS (exclusive)	
January 1	Lubbock, Texas	KSEL-TV	28	Independent	ABC	
January 6	Ashland, Kentucky	WKAS	25	Educational independent	NET	Part of the Kentucky Educational Television network
January 6	Bowling Green, Kentucky	WKGB-TV	53	Educational independent	NET	Part of the Kentucky Educational Television network
January 6	Elizabethtown, Kentucky	WKZT-TV	23	Educational independent	NET	Part of the Kentucky Educational Television network
January 6	Hazard, Kentucky	WKHA	35	Educational independent	NET	Part of the Kentucky Educational Television network
January 6	Lexington, Kentucky	WKLE	46	Educational independent	NET	Part of the Kentucky Educational Television network
January 6	Madisonville, Kentucky	WKMA-TV	35	Educational independent	NET	Part of the Kentucky Educational Television network
January 6	Morehead, Kentucky	WKMR	38	Educational independent	NET	Part of the Kentucky Educational Television network
January 6	Murray, Kentucky	WKMU	21	Educational independent	NET	Part of the Kentucky Educational Television network
January 6	Owenton, Kentucky	WKON	52	Educational independent	NET	Part of the Kentucky Educational Television network
January 6	Somerset, Kentucky	WKSO-TV	29	Educational independent	NET	Part of the Kentucky Educational Television network
May 12	Sioux Falls, South Dakota	KORN-TV	46	NBC (primary); ABC (secondary)	ABC (exclusive)	NBC would return to the station (as KDLT) in 1983
August 18	Hannibal, Missouri (Quincy, Illinois)	KHQA-TV	7	CBS (primary); ABC (secondary)	CBS (exclusive)	The secondary ABC affiliation ended with the sign-on of WJJY-TV in nearby Jacksonville, Illinois.
August 20	Bristol, Virginia (Bristol-Kingsport-Johnson City, Tennessee)	WCYB-TV	5	NBC (primary); ABC (secondary)	NBC (exclusive)	The secondary ABC affiliation ended with the sign-on of WKPT-TV/Kingsport.
August 20	Johnson City, Tennessee (Kingsport-Bristol, TN-VA)	WJHL-TV	11	CBS (primary); ABC (secondary)	CBS (exclusive)	The secondary ABC affiliation ended with the sign-on of WKPT-TV/Kingsport.
October 9	Marquette, Michigan	WLUC-TV	CBS (primary); ABC and NBC (secondary)	CBS (primary); ABC (secondary)	Secondary NBC affiliation was dropped with the sign-on of WJMN-TV; WLUC would trade network affiliations with WJMN to become an exclusive NBC affiliate in 1992	
October 25	Williston, North Dakota	KUMV-TV	8	NBC (primary); ABC and CBS (secondary)	NBC (primary); ABC (secondary)	
Unknown date	Great Falls, Montana	KFBB-TV	5	ABC (primary); CBS (secondary)	ABC (primary); NBC (secondary)	
Unknown date	Great Falls, Montana	KRTV	3	NBC	CBS	
Unknown date	Lubbock, Texas	KSEL-TV	28	Independent	ABC	
Unknown date	Santa Barbara, California	KEYT-TV	3	ABC (primary); CBS (exclusive)	ABC (exclusive)	Changed occurred on the occasion of the consolidation of the Santa Barbara and San Luis Obispo markets.
Unknown date	Santa Maria, California	KCOY-TV	12	NBC (primary); CBS (secondary)	CBS (exclusive)	Changed occurred on the occasion of the consolidation of the Santa Barbara and San Luis Obispo markets.
Unknown date	San Luis Obispo, California	KSBY	6	NBC (primary); CBS (secondary)	NBC (exclusive)	Changed occurred on the occasion of the consolidation of the Santa Barbara and San Luis Obispo markets.

=== Station closures ===
Date	City of license/Market	Station	Channel	Affiliation	Sign-on date	Notes
May	Worcester, Massachusetts	WJZB-TV	14	Independent (primary); NBC (secondary)	December 4, 1953 (as WWOR-TV)	
August 31	Corpus Christi, Texas	KVDO-TV	22	Independent	1968	
August 31	Galveston/Houston, Texas	KVVV-TV	16	Independent	February 1968	
September 13	Ventura/Los Angeles, California	KKOG-TV	16	Independent	December 14, 1968	
Unknown date	Jamestown-Buffalo, New York	WNYP-TV	26	Independent	1966	Returned to the air in 1988 as WTJA
Unknown date	Marion, Indiana	WTAF-TV	31	Independent	November 3, 1962	

== See also ==
- 1969 in television
- 1969 in film
- 1969 in the United States
- List of American films of 1969
