= KXNW =

Television station in Eureka Springs, Arkansas

- Eureka Springs–Fort Smith–; Fayetteville, Arkansas; United States
- City: Eureka Springs, Arkansas
- Channels: Digital: 25 (UHF); Virtual: 34
- Branding: KXNW; KNWA News on KXNW

Programming
- Affiliations: 34.1: Independent with MyNetworkTV; for others, see § Subchannels

Ownership
- Owner: Nexstar Media Group; (Tribune Broadcasting Company II LLC)
- Sister stations: KFTA-TV, KNWA-TV; Tegna: KFSM-TV

History
- Founded: June 25, 1999
- First air date: June 19, 2000
- Former call signs: KWBS-TV (2000–2004); KWFT (2004–July 2006); KBBL-TV (July–September 2006); KPBI (September 2006–2012)
- Former channel numbers: Analog: 34 (UHF, 2000–2009); Digital: 34 (UHF, until 2018)
- Former affiliations: Pax TV (2000–2003); Lick TV (2003–2004); The WB (2004–2006); RTV (2009–2011); MeTV (2011−2012); Univision (34.2, via KXUN-LP, until 2012); CBS (34.2, via KFSM-TV, 2012–2016); CBS (34.3, via KFSM-TV, 2016–2019)
- Call sign meaning: Northwest Arkansas (viewing area)

Technical information
- Licensing authority: FCC
- Facility ID: 81593
- ERP: 130 kW
- HAAT: 218 m (715 ft)
- Transmitter coordinates: 36°24′40.9″N 93°57′12.9″W
- Translator(s): KFTA-TV 34.1 Fort Smith

Links
- Public license information: Public file; LMS
- Website: www.nwahomepage.com

KXNW (channel 34) is a television station in Eureka Springs, Arkansas, United States, serving Northwest Arkansas and the Arkansas River Valley. It is programmed primarily as an independent station, but maintains a secondary affiliation with MyNetworkTV. KXNW is owned by Nexstar Media Group alongside NBC affiliate KNWA-TV (channel 51) and Fox affiliate KFTA-TV (channel 24); Nexstar's Tegna subsidiary owns CBS affiliate KFSM-TV (channel 5). KXNW, KNWA-TV and KFTA-TV share studios on Dickson Street in downtown Fayetteville, with a satellite studio in Rogers and a news bureau and sales office on Kelley Highway in Fort Smith. Although Eureka Springs is located in the Springfield, Missouri, media market, Nielsen considers KXNW to be part of the Fort Smith–Fayetteville market.

KXNW's transmitter is located on Humphrey Mountain near Garfield. Even though it broadcasts a digital signal of its own, its broadcasting radius does not reach Fort Smith. Therefore, the station is simulcast in high definition on KFTA-TV's fifth digital subchannel from a transmitter in unincorporated northeastern Crawford County (south of Artist Point). Instead of channel 24.5, KFTA-DT5 maps to channel 34.1.

== History ==
Channel 34 began operations on June 19, 2000, as KWBS-TV, which stood for "WB Springfield"; however, original station owner Equity Broadcasting decided to make another new station, Harrison-based KWBM (channel 31), as the WB affiliate for Springfield, and KWBS instead became affiliated with Pax (now Ion Television). KWBS dropped the Pax affiliation in 2003 in favor of the Equity-owned Lick TV, which was a short-lived network that broadcast professional wrestling events. One year later, the station dropped that network and was finally affiliated with The WB as its Northwest Arkansas affiliate. This was accompanied by a call-letter change to KWFT.

After it was announced in January 2006 that The WB and UPN would close down to form The CW in September, KWFT changed its call letters to KBBL-TV on July 6, 2006. However, its Fort Smith repeater retained the KWFT-LP call sign, which to this day it still uses. The KBBL-TV call letters were almost certainly not inspired by the KBBL-TV of The Simpsons, even though both stations are located in a designated market area (DMA) with the same name as the Simpsons' fictional hometown. Equity likes to use former radio call letters from its hometown of Little Rock, Arkansas, as TV call letters, and the KBBL call sign was once used by a Little Rock radio station.

The KPBI logo as a MyNetworkTV-affiliate

Around the same time as the call letters were changed, KBBL-TV was announced as joining the Retro Television Network (then owned by Equity) after The WB ceased operations, but as a result of KPBI-CA (channel 46) losing its Fox affiliation to then-NBC affiliate KFTA-TV (channel 24) and joining MyNetworkTV, channel 34 changed its call letters to KPBI on September 22, 2006, and began to carry KPBI-CA's programming schedule (KFDF-CA, the station that was originally scheduled to join MNTV, ended up becoming the RTV affiliate).

After failing to find a buyer at a bankruptcy auction, KPBI was sold to Pinnacle Media in August 2009 (after having initially been included in Silver Point Finance's acquisition on June 2 of several Equity stations) with Pinnacle assuming control under a local marketing agreement with soon-to-be-former owner Equity on August 5 of that same year. Pinnacle Media officially took ownership on November 3, 2009, and was restructured into Riverside Media in August 2010 with a change in the minority (40%) ownership in the company.

It was announced on August 12, 2009, that KPBI would join RTV, which had been dropped by KFDF in January after the network severed its ties with Equity. In 2010, KFSM-TV launched a second digital subchannel affiliated with MyNetworkTV. As of October 30, 2011, KPBI has dropped RTV in favor of MeTV programming.

=== Purchase by Local TV and then by Tribune ===
On September 1, 2011, Local TV, owner of CBS affiliate KFSM, filed papers with the Federal Communications Commission to purchase KPBI for $784,000 through a "failing station" waiver. This was necessary because the Fort Smith–Fayetteville DMA has only seven "unique" full-power television stations (though the ABC affiliate KHOG-TV is a satellite of Fort Smith–based parent KHBS, the FCC considers the parent and its satellite together as one unit). That small number of unique full-power stations is normally not enough to legally allow a duopoly. The sale to Local TV was completed on January 5, 2012; on that day, the station's callsign was changed to KXNW.

Immediately upon consummation, all remaining MeTV and RTV programming was dropped in favor of a simulcast of KFSM digital subchannel 5.2, which carries MyNetworkTV programming (also on KFSM-DT2) during prime time hours on weeknights; syndicated programming during the daytime hours and at select time periods on weekend mornings and afternoons; and as a part-time affiliate of Antenna TV on weekdays from 1 to 7 a.m., Saturdays from 1 to 8 a.m. and 6 p.m. to 6 a.m., and Sundays from 6 a.m. to 8 and 9 a.m. to 10, and midnight to 6 a.m. In addition, KXNW's digital subchannel 34.2 dropped Univision and began simulcasting KFSM's CBS-affiliated main channel 5.1. On October 23, 2016, KXNW added a simulcast of KFSM-DT3 on 34.2, resulting in the KFSM-DT1 simulcast moving to a new 34.3 subchannel.

On July 1, 2013, Local TV announced that its stations would be acquired by Tribune Broadcasting. The sale was completed on December 27. With the completion of the deal, KFSM and KXNW became Tribune's smallest stations by market size (previously, the company's New Orleans duopoly of WGNO and WNOL-TV held this distinction).

=== Aborted sale to Sinclair; sale to Nexstar ===
The Sinclair Broadcast Group entered into an agreement to acquire Tribune Media on May 8, 2017, for $3.9 billion, plus the assumption of $2.7 billion in Tribune debt. The deal received significant scrutiny over Sinclair's forthrightness, in its applications, in wanting to sell certain conflicting properties, prompting the FCC to designate it for hearing and leading Tribune to terminate the deal and sue Sinclair for breach of contract.

Following the Sinclair deal's collapse, Nexstar Media Group announced its purchase of Tribune Media on December 3, 2018, for $6.4 billion in cash and debt. As Nexstar already owned NBC affiliate KNWA-TV (channel 51) and Fox affiliate KFTA-TV (channel 24), the company agreed on March 20, 2019, to divest KFSM-TV to Tegna Inc. as part of a series of transactions, with multiple companies, that totaled $1.32 billion. As KXNW does not rank among the top four in its market in total-day viewership and therefore is not in conflict with existing FCC in-market ownership rules, it was retained by Nexstar, thus creating a de facto triopoly with KNWA and KFTA. The sale was completed on September 19, 2019.

== Newscasts ==
On March 12, 2012, KXNW began airing a weekday morning newscast at 7 a.m. and a nightly newscast at 9 p.m., broadcasts that are produced by KFSM. The latter newscast competes with the prime time newscast, which airs seven days a week on KFTA-TV (one hour on weekdays, and a half-hour on weekends).

As of September 19, 2019, KXNW no longer broadcasts newscasts from KFSM due to KXNW having been bought by Nexstar Media Group and KFSM's acquisition by Tegna.

In 2020, KNWA began producing 7 p.m. newscasts for KXNW.

== Technical information ==
=== Subchannels ===
The station's signal is multiplexed:

Subchannels of KXNW
Subchannel	Res.	Short name	Programming
34.1	720p	KXNW-DT	Main KXNW programming
34.2	480i	Rewind	Rewind TV
34.3	480i	Comet	Comet
34.4	480i	Bounce	Bounce TV

=== Analog-to-digital conversion ===
Because it was granted an original construction permit after the FCC finalized the DTV allotment plan on April 21, 1997, the station did not receive a companion channel for a digital television station. Instead, at the end of the digital TV conversion period for full-service stations, KPBI was required to turn off its analog signal and turn on its digital signal in a flash cut.

As of December 2008, this station was scheduled to go dark in 2009. According to the station's DTV status report, "On December 8, 2008, the licensee's parent corporation filed a petition for bankruptcy relief under Chapter 11 of the federal bankruptcy code... This station must obtain post-petition financing and court approval before digital facilities may be constructed. The station ceased analog broadcasting on February 17, 2009, regardless of whether digital facilities were operational by that date. The station filed authority to remain silent if so required by the FCC."

While the DTV Delay Act extended this deadline to June 12, 2009, Equity applied for an extension of the digital construction permit to retain the station's broadcast license after the station goes dark.
