= KFPW =

KFPW may refer to:

- KFPW-FM, a radio station (94.5 FM) licensed to Barling, Arkansas, United States
- KFPW (AM), a radio station (1230 AM) licensed to Fort Smith, Arkansas, United States
