= KFAA =

KFAA may refer to:

- KFAA (FM), a radio station (89.5 FM) licensed to Horace, North Dakota, United States
- KFAA-TV, a television station (channel 30, virtual 29) licensed to Decatur, Texas, United States
- KNWA-TV, a television station (channel 33, virtual 51) licensed to Rogers, Arkansas, United States, which held the call sign KFAA from 1985 to 2004
