= Jennifer Douglas =

American film producer

Jennifer C. Douglas
- Born: 1964 (age 61–62); Saginaw, Michigan
- Education: University of Michigan
- Occupations: Writer, filmmaker, activist
- Known for: Writer and co-producer of Save KLSD: Media Consolidation and Local Radio
- Spouse: Joe Vettel
- Website: www.sandiegomediareform.com

Jennifer Colleen Douglas (born 1964) is an American writer/producer and activist. She has worked in film, video, television, radio, print and Internet projects. She is the writer and co-producer of the 2012 documentary film, Save KLSD: Media Consolidation & Local Radio.

== Biography ==
Douglas graduated from Douglas MacArthur High School in Saginaw Township, Michigan, and graduated with a degree in English Language and Literature from the University of Michigan and pursued graduate coursework in public health at Hunter College in New York City. She and her engineer/CEO husband Joe Vettel and their daughter Genevieve and son Joel live in San Diego. Previously she lived in New York City and Washington, D.C.

== Selected media work ==
In Washington, D.C., Douglas was a staff news writer/field producer at WTTG-TV, and a freelance writer at CNN and WUSA-TV (CBS). She is the co-editor of Cooking with the Stars: Healthy, Delicious Recipes from Celebrities' Own Kitchens, with Michael Jacobson, PhD, founder and executive director of the Center for Science in the Public Interest. She wrote for The Low-Cholesterol Gourmet television series on the Discovery Channel hosted by Lynn Fischer, and researched Fischer's book, The Better Sex Diet. She was marketing director for the Snow Globe Christmas DVD, directed by Ron Ranson, and appears in the "Behind the Scenes" feature on the DVD. She and Ranson also produced an Iraq Memorial video for documentary director Robert Greenwald's Brave New Foundation.

Douglas wrote and co-produced with Jon Monday the 2012 documentary, Save KLSD: Media Consolidation and Local Radio, narrated by Jon Elliott and Bree Walker, and featuring Ed Schultz, Thom Hartmann, Amy Goodman, Van Jones, Richard Wolffe, Jonathan Adelstein, Robert Reich, Eric Klinenberg, David Shuster, Stacy Taylor and many others. The film had its broadcast premiere on Link TV in September 2012.

== Activism ==
Jennifer co-founded the grassroots project "San Diego Adopts Arizona", which brought volunteers from Southern California to Arizona to campaign for the 2004 Democratic presidential candidate John Kerry. In 2008 she led volunteers on trips to Nevada for the Democratic presidential candidate Obama and was planning trips to Arizona and Nevada to campaign for Obama's 2012 re-election. She is a founding member of the media reform group that grew out of the rallies to "Save KLSD" radio in 2007, now called CPR-San Diego (Campaign for Press Reform), which is becoming a project of the nonprofit group Common Cause.

Douglas is the founder of the Family Nature Meetup group for the San Diego Sierra Club and is on the working board of the San Diego Children and Nature Collaborative (SDCaN), which is part of the Children and Nature Network inspired by the work of San Diegan Richard Louv and his book Last Child in the Woods: Saving Our Children from Nature-Deficit Disorder.
