= Jon Elliott =

American business executive (born 1947)

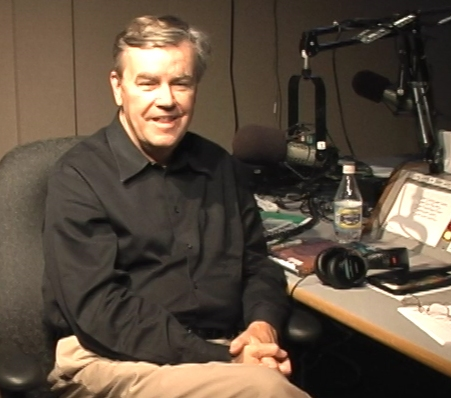
- Jon Elliott
- Born: June 1947 (age 79)
- Occupations: Radio and TV Personality
- Known for: Air America Radio Host
- Website: http://www.jonelliottshow.com/

Jon Elliott (born 1947) is an American former business executive and talk radio broadcaster, He formerly featured on Air America Radio.

== Business experience ==
Prior to his radio, TV, and film career, Elliott was the chief executive officer and chairman of the board of directors of multiple companies.

During his 35 years in business he has worked in all phases of corporate management, holding executive positions with corporations in the health, hospitality and food industries. He has also was CEO and president of Capitol Television Network and Royal Casino Group, both publicly traded companies.

The company was eventually renamed Baymark Technologies and Jon was President, CEO and CFO of Baymark Technologies until January 2006, at which time he resigned from the company as the company was restructured and renamed Implantable Vision.

== Radio work ==
In October 2004, The Jon Elliott Show began airing for two hours on Sunday afternoons on KLSD radio in San Diego, California. After he filled in for Air America hosts, Jon's show was picked up nationally by Air America Radio in September 2006. Billed as This Is America with Jon Elliott and airing live Monday through Friday from 10 pm to 1 am Eastern Time, the show was also carried live on XM radio channel 167 America Left. The show was carried in major markets including, New York, Washington D.C., and San Francisco. The Air America show ended on May 15, 2009.

Jon was the first national broadcast personality to announce live on air that he has epilepsy. He did so with guest John Meacham, the then Editor of Newsweek magazine [www.thedailybeast.com/newsweek.html] who had devoted almost an entire issue to epilepsy, Jon's neurologist and his wife Katherine. That show earned Jon and his production staff a San Diego Press Club “Excellence in Journalism Award” on October 20, 2009.

Jon was named to Talker's Magazines annual “Most Important Radio Talk Show Hosts in America” list for four consecutive years: 2007, 2008 2009, and 2010.

Jon was also the only talk radio personality asked to contribute to Susan Muccahy's book “Why I’m a Democrat” which was a collection of interviews and essays of over 50 distinct voices reflecting the rich diversity of the Democratic Party. Other contributors included Tony Bennett, James Brady, Dominick Dunne, Nora Ephron, Melissa Etheridge, and Thomas Franzen.

From Monday, May 18, 2009, through Thursday, September 18, 2009, Elliott had an afternoon show on XEPE AM 1700 San Diego, from 4 to 6 PM weekdays.

== Television work ==
Jon provides Liberal or Democratic Party perspective commentary for NBC's KNSD Channel 7, the only network-owned television station in San Diego. Jon has appeared as the “left” commentator on “Politically Speaking” and has appeared on numerous occasions during the station's newscasts.

In 1979 Jon was the host of “Sports Stars”, a pilot series shot in Beverly Hills, California. The half-hour program was a series of one-on-one interviews with sports personalities, including Hall of Fame basketball player Magic Johnson; the Los Angeles Dodgers’ Tommy Lasorda; the Los Angeles Kings' Marcel Dionne; and the owner of the Los Angeles Lakers & Kings’ owner Jerry Buss.

In 1986 Jon co-hosted the pilot for the television series “VCR: Video Cassette Review” with Loren Sydney, host of CNN's daily “Show Biz Today”. The program was taped in Hollywood, California.

Jon created several shows and was responsible for developing the programming schedule for Capitol Television Network, a Los Angeles–based start-up satellite-delivered programming service for independent television stations.

Throughout his career, Jon has been interviewed on many television programs related to his various business endeavors.

== Film work ==
Jon shares the on-camera narrator duties with Bree Walker for the feature-length documentary film, Save KLSD: Media Consolidation and Local Radio, which premiered in April 2012. An in-depth look at the limited number of corporations who control the majority of what Americans listen to on their radios, the film was four years in the making and was produced by award-winning documentary film producers Jon Monday and Jennifer Douglas, distributed by mondayMEDIA. He is also interviewed in the film, as a radio talk show host and media expert.

== Randi Rhodes incident ==
On October 14, 2007, Randi Rhodes, a radio talk show host on Air America Radio, sustained injuries that kept her off the air for several days. Jon Elliott was told by a senior Air America programming executive that Ms. Rhodes had been mugged the previous evening. On his show that night Jon reported the incident and speculated that the attack could have been the work of right-wing fanatics. It was later learned that Rhodes had sustained injuries from a fall outside an Irish bar she had been patronizing. Jon apologized the next night for his mistaken speculation. The story was reported by major media outlets including newspapers, television and radio programs.
