= Save KLSD =

Save KLSD: Media Consolidation and Local Radio
- Film poster
- Directed by: Jon Monday
- Produced by: Jon Monday and Jennifer Douglas
- Distributed by: mondayMEDIA
- Release date: April 28, 2012
- Running time: 101 minutes
- Language: English

Save KLSD is a 2012 documentary film about the history and effects of media consolidation on democracy in the United States. Over the course of four and a half years, the producers attended media reform conferences, conducted research, and filmed interviews and presentations by leading media reform experts and commentators. In 2015 a one-hour version was posted on YouTube.

Those involved in the film include: Bill Moyers, Robert Reich, Van Jones, Phil Donahue, Ed Schultz, David Shuster, Cenk Uygur, Amy Goodman, Thom Hartmann, Stacy Taylor, John Nichols, Richard Wolffe, Randi Rhodes, Congressman Bob Filner, Jon Adelstein, Robert McChesney, Bob Edgar, Mike Aguirre, Marjorie Cohn, Michael Krasny, J.W. August, Andrew Donohue, Marti Emerald, and author Eric Klinenberg.

Save KLSD is narrated by Bree Walker and Jon Elliott. It is produced by Jennifer Douglas and Jon Monday, and directed by Jon Monday for distribution by mondayMEDIA. It was released on DVD in April 2012.

The film's national broadcast premiered on Link TV on Saturday, September 8, 2012 at 2:30pm PST.

== Plot ==
The film traces the events of 2007 when local radio station KLSD in San Diego, California, owned by radio giant Clear Channel Communications, decided to alter the programming from progressive talk radio to sports talk. Local activists hold protest rallies and try to persuade the owners to keep the liberal format, the only outlet for liberal talk in the San Diego market.

At the time, the station was being considered for the change. It ranked #1 in time spent listening and had a growing market share. It also explores the history of media and broadcast regulation, the move to deregulate, and the impact from deregulation that allowed for what the filmmakers consider to be unprecedented consolidation, to the point where a majority of all media (radio, TV, newspapers, magazines, and internet) are controlled by just five major corporations.
