= Bree Walker =

American actress

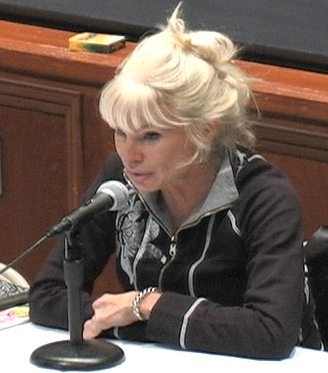
- Walker at Common Cause Media Conference 2008
- Born: Patricia Lynn Nelson; February 26, 1953 (age 72); Oakland, California, U.S.
- Occupations: Actress, Talk Show Host, News Anchor
- Known for: work at WCBS-TV and KCBS-TV
- Spouses: Robert Smith Walker (m. 1980–1990) Jim Lampley (m. 1990–1999)
- Children: 2

Bree Walker (born Patricia Lynn Nelson; February 26, 1953) is an American radio talk show host, actress, and disability-rights activist. She gained fame as the first on-air American television network news anchor with ectrodactyly. Walker worked as a news anchor and reporter in San Diego, New York City, and Los Angeles.

== Early life ==
Walker was born in Oakland, California, and raised in Austin, Minnesota. She inherited ectrodactyly, a rare genetic condition which causes missing digits and syndactyly, which causes fused digits.

== TV and radio ==
After graduating from the University of Minnesota, Walker worked as a disc jockey in Kansas City, New York City and San Diego, where she went by Bree Bushaw, her first husband's name.

She started her television career in 1980 at KGTV in San Diego as a consumer advocacy reporter. Established and well into her career at KGTV, Walker decided to go public with her ectrodactyly after previously keeping her hands hidden inside a pair of glove-like prosthetic ones. With them now clearly visible, she continued her newscasting career at KGTV.

== Acting ==
Walker has also dabbled in acting, appearing as herself in the end-of-the-world science-fiction thriller, Without Warning (credited as Bree Walker-Lampley but referred to on screen as Bree Walker), and as television reporter Wendy Sorenson in The Chase. She also guest-starred on an episode of the PBS children's series, Reading Rainbow, to talk about her disability.

While watching the 2003 season of Carnivàle, an HBO television series about a Depression-era carnival traveling through the Dust Bowl, Walker noticed that no cast member had ectrodactyly. She requested, created, auditioned and won the role of Sabina the Scorpion Lady. Her portrayal of Sabina appeared in three episodes during the 2005 season. She showcased her webbed hands as the series probed public attitudes toward persons with highly visible disabilities. She based Sabina on characters she knew existed in the 1920s and 1930s carnival sideshows with names like "Lobster Girl" or "Lobster Boy." These were typically the best jobs people with ectrodactyly could have, with most others being hidden away.

Walker furthered her acting career in 2006 by appearing as an inspirational woman with ectrodactyly on the fourth-season premiere of Nip/Tuck.

Walker shares the on-camera narrator duties with Jon Elliott for the feature-length documentary film, Save KLSD: Media Consolidation and Local Radio, which was first screened in April 2012. It looks at the shrinking number of corporations that control the majority of what Americans watch and listen to on TV, radio, newspapers, and magazines. It was over four years in the making and was produced by Jon Monday and Jennifer Douglas, distributed by mondayMEDIA. She is also in the film as an expert, speaking at a media reform conference.

== Purchase of Camp Casey ==
In June 2007, it was announced that Walker had purchased Cindy Sheehan's 5-acre (20,000 m^{2}) "Camp Casey" site in Crawford, Texas for $87,000, in response to Sheehan's May 26, 2007 announcement that she would be selling the property and ending her antiwar activities. Sheehan handed the deed to Walker during her June 9, 2007, broadcast of "The Bree Walker show." Walker has preserved the property as a peace memorial and garden and keeps it open to antiwar protesters. It is featured prominently on Walker's website.

== Personal life ==
Walker has been married and divorced three times. She has a daughter named Andrea Layne Walker (born August 12, 1988) with her second husband, independent film and video producer Robert Walker, and a son named Aaron James Lampley with her third husband, news anchor and sportscaster Jim Lampley.

She and her children were featured on an episode of TLC's My Unique Family; she refuses to answer questions about rumors that she has silicone lip implants. Her son and daughter both have ectrodactyly; she reacted very strongly on her blog to Oprah Winfrey's implication that a "normal" child would have all their fingers and their toes.

== Honors and awards ==
Walker was nominated and inducted into the San Diego Women's Hall of Fame in 2010 a collaboration between Women's Museum of California, Commission on the Status of Women, University of California, San Diego Women's Center, and San Diego State University Women's Studies.
