= KNWA-TV =

Television station in Rogers, Arkansas

- Rogers–Fayetteville–; Fort Smith, Arkansas; United States
- City: Rogers, Arkansas
- Channels: Digital: 33 (UHF); Virtual: 51
- Branding: KNWA

Programming
- Affiliations: 51.1: NBC; 51.2: Fox (KFTA-TV); for others, see § Subchannels

Ownership
- Owner: Nexstar Media Group; (sale pending to a third party); (Nexstar Media Inc.)
- Sister stations: KFTA-TV, KXNW; Tegna: KFSM-TV

History
- First air date: August 23, 1989
- Former call signs: KFAA (1989–2004)
- Former channel numbers: Analog: 51 (UHF, 1989–2009); Digital: 50 (UHF, to 2019)
- Call sign meaning: Northwest Arkansas

Technical information
- Licensing authority: FCC
- Facility ID: 29557
- ERP: 820 kW
- HAAT: 258.7 m (849 ft)
- Transmitter coordinates: 36°24′48″N 93°57′17.4″W
- Translator(s): KFTA-TV 24.2 Fort Smith

Links
- Public license information: Public file; LMS
- Website: www.nwahomepage.com

KNWA-TV (channel 51) is a television station licensed to Rogers, Arkansas, United States, serving as the NBC affiliate for Northwest Arkansas and the Arkansas River Valley. It is owned by Nexstar Media Group alongside KFTA-TV (channel 24), a Fox affiliate, and KXNW (channel 34), an independent station with MyNetworkTV. Nexstar's Tegna subsidiary owns CBS affiliate KFSM-TV (channel 5). KNWA-TV, KFTA-TV and KXNW share studios on Dickson Street in downtown Fayetteville. KNWA-TV's transmitter is located southeast of Garfield, Arkansas; its programming is also broadcast from KFTA-TV's transmitter south of Artist Point as one of its subchannels and vice versa.

Channel 51 began broadcasting as KFAA on August 23, 1989. It served as a satellite station of channel 24, then KPOM-TV, owned by Griffin TV. The addition of channel 51 resolved a coverage shortfall for KPOM-TV in fast-growing, affluent Northwest Arkansas that had hindered its competitive position. The two stations carried the same NBC programming and local news, though they had separate advertisements and promotions; KFAA had its own studios in Rogers and eventually originated Northwest Arkansas news inserts for the shared newscasts. The expanded coverage did not improve channel 24/51's news ratings, which had long been in third place, and Griffin discontinued the news department in 1992. Northwest Arkansas's growth in the 1990s made it possible for Griffin to restore a newscast in 2000. As part of the effort, Griffin built new studios in the Campbell-Bell building in downtown Fayetteville.

When Nexstar assumed control of KPOM–KFAA in 2004, it reoriented the news department to primarily serve Northwest Arkansas, changing the stations' call signs to KFTA-TV and KNWA-TV, respectively; moving station operations from Fort Smith to Fayetteville; and reallocating news resources to focus on the Fayetteville area. In 2006, Nexstar split the signals of the two stations, with Fox programming on KFTA, NBC on KNWA, and both services broadcast market-wide as digital subchannels. Even though the stations had separate programming, they were considered one program service by the Federal Communications Commission as a legacy of their prior configuration, enabling Nexstar to own KXNW.

On March 20, 2026, it was announced that KNWA would be sold as part of Nexstar's acquisition of Tegna, owner of KFSM-TV.

== History ==
=== Construction and Griffin ownership ===
Channel 51 was allocated to Rogers, Arkansas, in 1984. The only application for the channel came from MCC Communications, a company owned by John McCutcheon, which was granted the permit in 1985. McCutcheon struggled to find financing to construct the station as a standalone operation, and in February 1986, Griffin TV agreed to acquire the permit to serve as a semi-satellite of KPOM-TV (channel 24), the NBC affiliate in Fort Smith, for Northwest Arkansas. KPOM-TV's penetration of the area—rapidly growing and affluent—was poor.

Over an objection from KSNF-TV in Joplin, Missouri, which claimed the combination would have excessive overlap and signal loss issues, the Federal Communications Commission (FCC) approved the transfer in December 1988. KFAA began broadcasting on August 23, 1989, and the station's newscasts were retitled Newsline 24/51. The 12-person Fayetteville bureau was replaced with a partially separate, 25- to 30-person operation in Rogers, and the station began presenting its newscasts in a dual-city format with an anchor in both cities, an approach already used by channels 40/29. Except for Mike Nail, the Fayetteville-based sports director who doubled as the voice of Arkansas Razorbacks athletics, most of the on-air news staff turned over.

One thing that did not change was that KPOM–KFAA rated third in the full market, often by distant margins compared to KFSM and KHBS/KHOG. However, its ratings status was higher in Benton County, the county containing Rogers, which was reassigned to the Fort Smith–Fayetteville market from Joplin, Missouri, in 1989. In 1991, Griffin agreed to sell KPOM–KFAA to Newark Broadcasting; it had been attempting to sell the pair since late 1989. In anticipation of the move, the station relaunched its newscasts as Eyewitness News in September. The new format included a split segment of news for Northwest Arkansas viewers, though most of the program still originated from Fort Smith. Citing a lack of demand for their news product, Griffin shuttered the KPOM–KFAA news operation effective June 12, 1992, resulting in the dismissal of 22 employees in Fort Smith and Rogers.

A proposed transfer of KPOM and KFAA to Northwest Arkansas Broadcasting was filed with the FCC in September 1992. The buyer's owners were beneficiaries of the Robert Hernreich family trust; Robert was the son of George Hernreich, primary owner of KHBS/KHOG. The New York Times Company objected, believing this created an ownership complication that gave the Hernreichs a then-illegal duopoly and control over both stations. The application was never acted on by the FCC and was withdrawn in March 1993.

After the Northwest Arkansas Broadcasting sale fell through, Griffin opted to retain KPOM and KFAA. In December 1999, Griffin announced that it had agreed to lease space in the former Campbell-Bell department store in downtown Fayetteville, which was being renovated, and intended to restart local news production from the site. Griffin saw the potential for higher revenue in the market than had been possible when the news department was dissolved in 1992. Nail, who had worked at KHBS/KHOG after KPOM–KFAA ceased producing news, returned as sportscaster, while two other KHBS/KHOG personalities—weatherman Steve Gibbs and reporter Rhonda Justice—moved over to the new news department, which began offering newscasts on August 3, 2000. In its return, the station again placed third in local news ratings.

=== Nexstar ownership ===
After the FCC relaxed limits on TV station ownership, Griffin received more inquiries from potential buyers of KPOM and KFAA. In September 2003, it announced it was negotiating with Nexstar Broadcasting Group. The next month, the companies entered into a letter of intent, and Nexstar assumed management duties under a time brokerage agreement.

Nexstar immediately moved to shift station operations from Fort Smith to Fayetteville, as Northwest Arkansas now represented the majority of the media market's population. In February 2004, the Fayetteville facility became the main studio, and two public affairs programs produced in Fort Smith—one of which had been on the air on channel 24 since 1978—were canceled. In August, the reporter and photographer assigned to cover news in Fort Smith were moved to Fayetteville, though the station promised to cover news in Fort Smith on an as-needed basis. On August 13, 2004, both stations changed call signs: KPOM-TV to KFTA-TV and KFAA to KNWA-TV. The changes made viewers in the Arkansas River Valley feel like the station had left them behind, even though it had introduced Fort Smith–specific weather forecasts shortly afterward. The mayor of Fort Smith, Ray Baker, called the move "a mistake" that would lead to less coverage of what was then the second-largest city in Arkansas. Some business operations were consolidated at Little Rock, where Nexstar owned KARK-TV.

=== KNWA/KFTA split ===
On April 19, 2006, Nexstar Broadcasting Group announced it would sell KFTA-TV to Brecksville, Ohio–based Mission Broadcasting, a group which maintained joint sales and shared services agreements with Nexstar-operated outlets in other cities, for $5.6 million. Under the terms of the agreement, KFTA would continue to be operated by Nexstar under agreement but would split from KNWA to broadcast Fox on a full-power signal as well as a prime time local newscast. Mission leased the Kelley Highway offices and renovated them to house its operation. The area's existing Fox affiliate was a low-power station, KPBI-CA (channel 46). KPBI-CA's affiliation agreement let Fox move its programming to a full-power station, such as KFTA-TV, on 90 days' notice. Its owner, Equity Broadcasting, challenged the sale of KFTA with the FCC, claiming the move would result in an unauthorized duopoly. Even while the challenge was pending, KFTA became a Fox affiliate on August 28. Until the license challenge was to be settled, KFTA continued to simulcast KNWA from 7 a.m to 5 p.m. KFTA was only available in Fayetteville and KNWA in Fort Smith using digital subchannels. Coinciding with the switch to Fox, KFTA began airing a 9 p.m. newscast on weeknights concentrating on Fort Smith–area news. Even though the FCC approved the transaction in 2008 (admonishing Nexstar for making false claims and barring them from simulcasting each other's digital signals), Mission never acquired KFTA, and in 2019, Nexstar acquired another Northwest Arkansas–market station, KXNW (channel 34). It was able to do so because the FCC recognized KNWA-TV as operating as a satellite of KFTA-TV under a waiver.

KFTA shut its Fort Smith office in 2011 and moved all operations to Fayetteville. In October 2012, KNWA–KFTA relocated its operations into its current facility at the Dickson condominium complex on West Dickson Street, occupying approximately 12,000 square feet (1,100 m^{2}) of studio space on the third floor of the building. This enabled an expanded news presence on KFTA. That year, KNWA joined the other Nexstar-owned NBC affiliates serving Arkansas (KARK, KTAL-TV, and KTVE) in airing a statewide midday newscast, Arkansas Today, which featured sports segments from Fayetteville.

On March 20, 2026, it was announced that KNWA would be sold as part of Nexstar's acquisition of Tegna.

== Technical information ==
=== Subchannels ===
KNWA-TV's transmitter is southeast of Garfield; KFTA-TV's transmitter is located on Cartwright Mountain near Artist Point. KNWA-TV and KFTA-TV broadcast two shared channels (NBC on 51.1 and 24.2 and Fox on 51.2 and 24.1) and two unique diginets each.

Subchannels of KNWA-TV
Subchannel	Res.	Short name	Programming
51.1	1080i	KNWA-DT	NBC
51.2	720p	KFTA-DT	Fox (KFTA-TV)
51.3	480p	Laff	Laff
51.4	480p	Grit	Grit

Simulcast of subchannels of another station

=== Analog-to-digital conversion ===
KNWA-TV ended regular programming on its analog signal, over UHF channel 51, on June 12, 2009, the official digital television transition date. The station's digital signal remained on its pre-transition UHF channel 50, using virtual channel 51. It remained on channel 50 until relocating to channel 33 on April 12, 2019, as a result of the 2016 United States wireless spectrum auction.
