= KFSM-TV =

Television station in Fort Smith, Arkansas

- Fort Smith–Fayetteville, Arkansas; United States
- City: Fort Smith, Arkansas
- Channels: Digital: 18 (UHF); Virtual: 5
- Branding: Channel 5; 5 News

Programming
- Affiliations: 5.1: CBS; for others, see § Subchannels

Ownership
- Owner: Tegna Inc., a subsidiary of Nexstar Media Group; (Cape Publications, Inc.)
- Sister stations: KFTA-TV, KNWA-TV, KXNW

History
- First air date: July 9, 1953
- Former call signs: KFSA-TV (1953–1958, 1959–1973); KNAC-TV (1958–1959)
- Former channel numbers: Analog: 22 (UHF, 1953–1958), 5 (VHF, 1958–2009)
- Former affiliations: NBC (1953–1980); DuMont (secondary, 1953–1956); CBS (secondary, 1953-1971); ABC (secondary, 1953–1978); MyNetworkTV (5.2, 2009−2019)
- Call sign meaning: Fort Smith, disambiguation of previous license's KFSA calls ("A" for Arkansas; FSM is also the airport designation for the Fort Smith Regional Airport)

Technical information
- Licensing authority: FCC
- Facility ID: 66469
- ERP: 608 kW; 15 kW (DRT)
- HAAT: 273.4 m (897 ft); 42.5 m (139 ft) (DRT)
- Transmitter coordinates: 35°49′49.3″N 94°9′24.3″W; 35°23′7.3″N 94°24′57.7″W (DRT)
- Translator(s): 24 (UHF) Van Buren

Links
- Public license information: Public file; LMS
- Website: 5newsonline.com

KFSM-TV (channel 5) is a television station licensed to Fort Smith, Arkansas, United States, serving the Arkansas River Valley and Northwest Arkansas as an affiliate of CBS. It is owned by the Tegna subsidiary of Nexstar Media Group; Nexstar owns KFTA-TV (channel 24), a Fox affiliate, KNWA-TV (channel 51), an NBC affiliate, and KXNW (channel 34), an independent station with MyNetworkTV. KFSM-TV's studios are located on South 48th Street in Johnson (with a Springdale mailing address), and its primary transmitter is located northwest of Winslow, Arkansas.

== History ==
KFSM-TV signed on for the first time on July 9, 1953, as KFSA-TV on channel 22. It was owned by Donald W. Reynolds and his Donrey Media Group alongside Fort Smith's two major newspapers—the Southwest American and Times Record (later merged as the Southwest Times Record)—and KFSA radio (AM 950). KFSA radio personality Pat Porta hosted the first broadcast. The station's studios and transmitter were located in the Times Record/Southwest American building at 920 Rogers Avenue in downtown Fort Smith. It carried programming from all four networks of the time—NBC, CBS, ABC and DuMont—but it was a primary NBC affiliate.

Initially, KFSA-TV relied on kinescopes of network programming and various live performers in the Fort Smith area. Local talent included Clint Fisher, Freddie Rose and programs from Camp Chaffee (later Fort Chaffee). Most commercials were live since videotapes were not yet available. A local TV-Appliance dealer, Bill Engles (a.k.a. "Wild Bill") along with Engles TV & Appliance, bought the first commercial live spots for $1.00 per minute.

At that time, the network live signal reached only as far as Memphis, Tennessee. However, the networks extended the AT&T coaxial cable to Little Rock in 1957 to provide live coverage of the Little Rock Crisis. Reynolds then built a microwave relay hop on Mount Magazine to relay live programming from the Little Rock stations. Although the system was less than dependable, it was far better than kinescopes which aired as many as three weeks after the original air date. Many old timers remember the station's microwave problems that disrupted several games of the 1954 World Series.

In 1956, KFSA-TV gained a competitor when KNAC-TV signed on channel 5 from studios in Van Buren as a primary CBS affiliate and secondary ABC affiliate. At that time, CBS was the top network with such hits as Red Skelton, Jackie Gleason and Ed Sullivan's Toast of the Town and later, Your Show of Shows. The network was number one in viewers and KNAC-TV quickly became a favorite because of its VHF signal and CBS affiliation. Meanwhile, channel 22's UHF signal did not reach much farther than 30 miles (48 km) from downtown Fort Smith, leaving many homes without clear television reception. At the time, UHF stations could only be seen with an expensive converter, and even with one picture quality was marginal at best. Additionally, the Fort Smith television market is a fairly large market geographically, spilling across a large and mostly mountainous swath of Arkansas and Oklahoma. UHF stations do not get good reception over large areas or in rugged terrain. It did not help that viewers in Fort Smith could receive stations from Tulsa and Little Rock by using large masts and rotary antennas.

During the late 1950s, both KFSA-TV and KNAC struggled for advertising and viewers. By 1958, it became apparent the Fort Smith market was not large enough to support two television stations. Talks between Reynolds and KNAC's owner, businessman Hiram Nakdeiman, resulted in an agreement to merge the two stations. The merged station would use the KFSA-TV call letters under the ownership of the wealthier Reynolds, but operate under KNAC's license using the stronger channel 5 facility. However, under the terms of an agreement with the Federal Communications Commission (FCC), the merged station used the KNAC call letters until the sale formally closed.

KFSA-TV signed off permanently from channel 22 on August 16, 1958. The two stations' operations were merged at a converted furniture warehouse in downtown Fort Smith at North 5th and B Streets that had originally been renovated for KNAC-TV. After the license transfer to Donrey's broadcasting subsidiary, American Television Company, was finalized in January 1959, channel 5 changed its calls to KFSA-TV. The merged operation benefited from a technical quirk in the FCC's original television allocation plan. Most markets received two commercial VHF licenses plus a noncommercial VHF license. However, Fort Smith and Fayetteville are sandwiched between Little Rock (channels 2, 4, 7, and 11) to the east, Shreveport–Texarkana (channels 3, 6, and 12) to the south, Springfield (channels 3 and 10) and Pittsburg–Joplin (channels 7 and 12) to the north, and Tulsa (channels 2, 6, 8, and 11) to the west. This created a large "doughnut" in Northwest Arkansas where there could be only one commercial VHF license, plus a noncommercial license (eventually occupied by AETN's KAFT).

Many of the personnel at channel 22 (Pat Porta, Harry Freeman, John Candler, and wrestling promoter Jimmy Lott) made the transition to channel 5. KNAC's weathermen LeRoy Stollard and Cy Spicer were also staff members of the new operation. All became icons in Fort Smith's broadcasting history. Many had started their broadcasting careers on KFSA radio just after World War II.

Until 1964, the station operated without a dedicated news department, instead relying on reports from its sister newspapers. However, that changed with the addition of Cliff Walker, who became the outlet's first news director. Walker had worked for KFSA radio and earlier for Nakdieman at KWHN.

In 1969, the FCC barred common ownership of newspapers and broadcasting outlets. Donrey owned one other newspaper/broadcasting cluster, the Las Vegas Review-Journal and KORK-AM-FM-TV. While Reynolds was able to get grandfathered protection for his Las Vegas cluster, he was unable to get it for his flagship cluster in Fort Smith. As a result, the KFSA stations were sold off, with channel 5 going to Buford Television on May 31, 1973, and renamed KFSM-TV (after the airport designation for Fort Smith Regional Airport). The station was purchased by The New York Times Company in 1979, and subsequently became that company's second station after WREG-TV in Memphis.

Aside from KNAC's brief time on-the-air, KFSA/KFSM was the only station in Fort Smith for 18 years. However, the Fayetteville area was served by KGTO (TV) in the late-1960s and 1970s. The station lost its CBS affiliation when KFPW-TV (now KHBS) signed on in 1971. It lost ABC in 1978 when KFPW-TV surrendered its CBS affiliation to new sign-on KLMN-TV (now KFTA-TV). KFSM swapped affiliations with KLMN in 1980 and became a CBS affiliate, which it remains today. This was due to the network searching for stronger affiliates in the Fort Smith market. On September 28, 2009, KFSM added MyNetworkTV to its second digital subchannel. Previously, the subchannel had served as a local news repeat channel. The area's original MyNetworkTV affiliate, KPBI-CA, which was repeated on full-power KPBI, went silent after its owner Equity Media Holdings went bankrupt. Full-power KPBI, at one point a standalone RTV affiliate, officially became KFSM's sister station on January 5, 2012, with an FCC "failing station" waiver and changed its call letters to KXNW; at that time, KXNW dropped all remaining RTV programming in favor of a simulcast of KFSM-DT2, which had for a while also carried a part-time affiliation with Antenna TV in addition to its primary MyNetworkTV affiliation (until Antenna TV was ultimately segregated out onto its own dedicated sub-channel via KFSM-DT3, as of spring 2016).

The New York Times Company sold its entire broadcasting division, including KFSM, to Local TV in 2007. During the analog television era, KFSM was the only big three affiliate that did not need a second full-power station to reach the entire market.

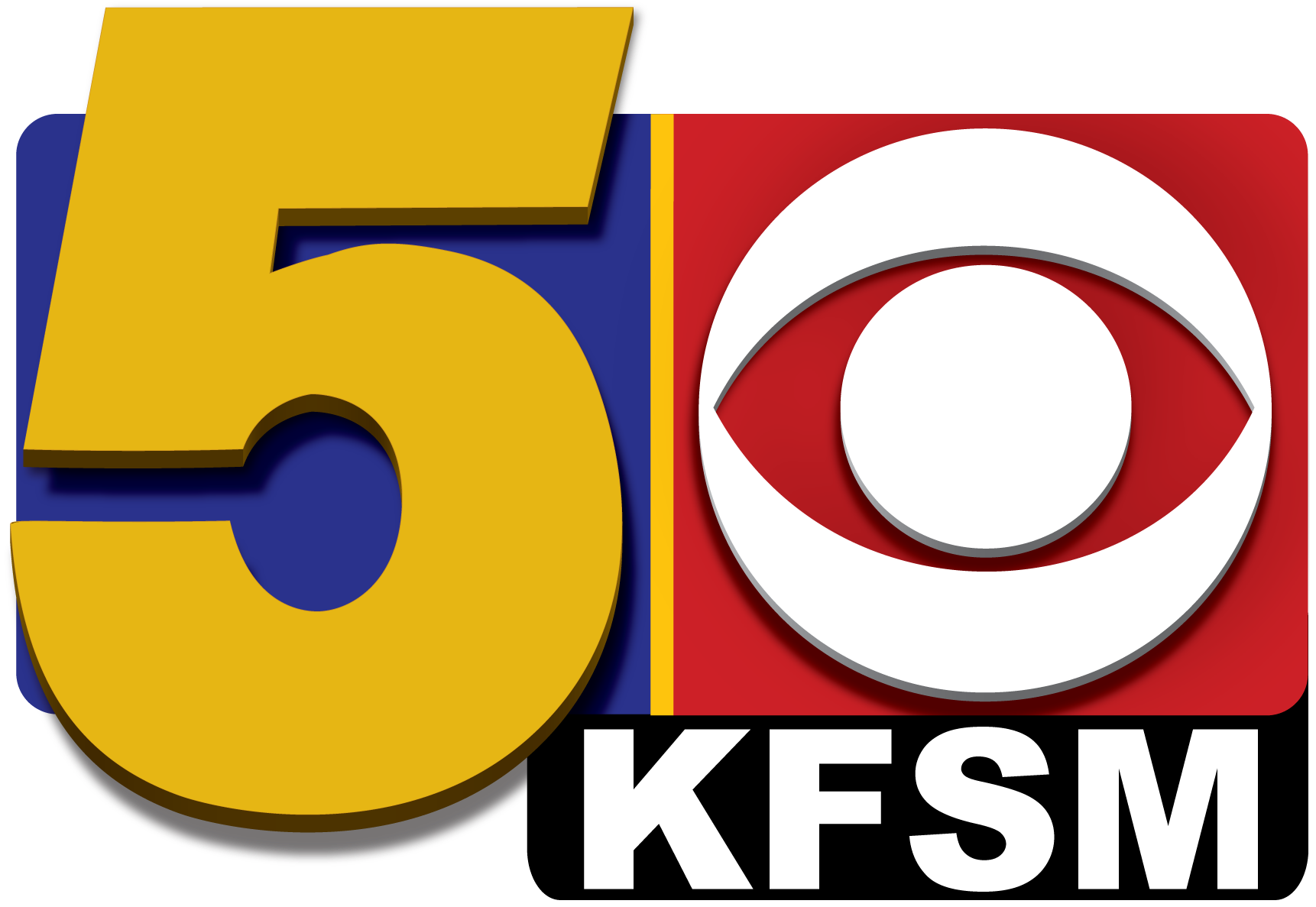
KFSM logo, used from 1997 to 2019. The "5" has been in use since 1989; the italicized version shown in the infobox was adopted after Tegna took control.

On September 1, 2010, the FCC granted KFSM a construction permit for a fill-in translator in Van Buren on channel 24. KFSM operated a low-power analog translator, K62DQ (channel 62), licensed to Fayetteville with a transmitter in Johnson along I-540/US 62/US 71. It had a construction permit to air on channel 44, but its license was cancelled on May 4, 2012.

On July 1, 2013, Local TV announced that its stations would be acquired by Tribune Broadcasting. The sale was completed on December 27. With the completion of the deal, KFSM and KXNW became Tribune's smallest television stations by market size (previously, the company's New Orleans duopoly of WGNO and WNOL-TV held this distinction).

=== Aborted sale to Sinclair; sale to Nexstar; resale to Tegna ===
Sinclair Broadcast Group entered into an agreement to acquire Tribune Media on May 8, 2017, for $3.9 billion, plus the assumption of $2.7 billion in Tribune debt. The deal received significant scrutiny over Sinclair's forthrightness in its applications to sell certain conflict properties, prompting the FCC to designate it for hearing and leading Tribune to terminate the deal and sue Sinclair for breach of contract.

Following the Sinclair deal's collapse, Nexstar Media Group announced its purchase of Tribune Media on December 3, 2018, for $6.4 billion in cash and debt. As Nexstar already owned NBC affiliate KNWA-TV (channel 51) and Fox affiliate KFTA-TV (channel 24), the company agreed on March 20, 2019, to divest KFSM-TV to Tegna Inc. as part of a series of transactions with multiple companies that totaled $1.32 billion. As KXNW does not rank among the top four in total-day viewership and therefore is not in conflict with existing FCC in-market ownership rules, it was retained by Nexstar, thus creating a de facto triopoly with KNWA and KFTA. The sale was completed on September 19, 2019.

=== Northwest Arkansas studio era and back to Nexstar ===
On June 14, 2019, KFSM moved most of its operations to a newly built studio in Johnson, a suburb of Fayetteville and Springdale, 63 miles (101 km) from downtown Fort Smith. According to station manager Van Comer, the new facility is located near the population center of KFSM's 11-county, two-state primary coverage area. KFSM had been the only major station in the market whose main studio was still located in Fort Smith; NBC affiliate KNWA-TV and Fox affiliate KFTA are based in Fayetteville, while ABC affiliates KHBS/KHOG are based in Rogers. Fort Smith had been the state's second-largest city for most of the 20th century and well into the 21st, but by this time Fayetteville had passed Fort Smith in population. When the station announced plans to build the facility in 2018, original plans called for a newer facility in Fort Smith to serve as its main studio. However, by 2019, the planned Johnson studio had become the main studio, which timed to the repeal of the FCC's Main Studio Rule that required the station's studios to be within 25 miles (40 km) of its city of license. The station's longtime home in Fort Smith was briefly retained as a River Valley bureau, but the studio in Johnson is now the station's only location. The old studio was purchased at auction by University of Arkansas–Fort Smith professor and preservationist Diana Sims in 2024 for $149,000, mainly for the building's origination as Fort Smith's Carnegie library.

In July 2021, chief meteorologist Garrett Lewis left KFSM after 20 years with the station to pursue a career in finance and community relations.

Nexstar Media Group acquired Tegna in a deal announced in August 2025 and completed in March 2026. As part of the transaction, Nexstar—which already owned KXNW, KFTA-TV, and KNWA-TV in this market—committed to the divestiture of KNWA-TV within two years, along with five other stations in markets where the two companies combined held four TV station licenses.

== News operation ==
KFSM currently broadcasts 35 1/2 hours of newscasts each week (with six hours each weekday, 2 1/2 hours on Saturdays and three hours on Sundays), a considerable amount for a station in the 100th market. The station launched a mobile application in 2005.

Over the years, KFSM has been the ratings leader in the area, mainly due to the fact that it was the only commercial VHF station on the air in the Fort Smith–Fayetteville market during the analog television era. As such, it was the only station in the market that did not need a second full-power analog transmitter to cover it.

On April 21, 1996, a large tornado, part of the April 1996 tornado outbreak sequence, destroyed and heavily damaged much of historic downtown Fort Smith around the Garrison Avenue Bridge. The storm left four people dead in western Arkansas. KFSM-TV covered the tornado and produced a documentary of the event shortly after called "Sunday's Fury". Days later, the Eads Brothers Furniture Building was destroyed by one of largest fires in Fort Smith's history.

Until January 2012, KFSM-DT2 simulcast the weekday morning show and then re-aired it in a rotating cycle. It also simulcasted the weekday noon and nightly broadcasts. The simulcasts were discontinued shortly after Local TV consummated on its purchase of the former KPBI and changed its call letters to KXNW, and were replaced with Antenna TV and syndicated programming as KXNW began to simulcast KFSM-DT2. On March 12, 2012, KXNW/KFSM-DT2 began airing a new hour-long 7 a.m. newscast on weekday mornings and a 30-minute newscast at 9 p.m. nightly. On weeknights, the latter newscast competes with the prime time newscast which airs on Fox affiliate KFTA-TV; KXNW was the only station which airs a 9 p.m. newscast on weekends until August 2012 when KHBS/KHOG began producing a nightly 9 p.m. newscast for their CW Plus-affiliated digital subchannels.

At some point during summer 2012, KFSM became the first station in the Fayetteville-Fort Smith market and the last primary Local TV-owned station to begin broadcasting its local newscasts in high definition.

In fall 2017, KFSM began airing a 30-minute newscast at 4 p.m., titled 5 News First at Four. This was the first 4 p.m. newscast in the Fayetteville-Fort Smith market, and the only such newscast until KHOG launched a 4 p.m. show in August 2024.

In March 2020, KFSM temporarily scaled back its broadcast schedule in response to the COVID-19 pandemic. On weekdays, 5 News This Morning was shortened 30 minutes, beginning at 5 a.m. instead of 4:30 a.m. A replay of the previous night's edition of 5 News at 10 was played to fill the time slot. Additionally, on Saturdays, 5 News This Morning was sometimes replaced by a simulcast of sister station KTHV's Saturday morning newscast. In November 2020, KFSM returned to its normal broadcast schedule with 5 News This Morning weekdays beginning at 4:30 a.m. and 5 News This Morning Saturday originating as a KFSM broadcast rather than a KTHV simulcast.

== Technical information ==
=== Subchannels ===
The station's signal is multiplexed:

Subchannels of KFSM-TV
Subchannel	Res.	Short name	Programming
5.1	1080i	KFSM-DT	CBS
5.2	480i	Crime	True Crime Network
5.3	480i	Antenna	Antenna TV
5.4	480i	Quest	Quest
5.5	480i	NEST	The Nest
5.6	480i	BUSTED	Busted
5.7	480i	GetTV	Great
5.8	480i	365BLK	365BLK

=== Translator ===
- KFSM-TV (DRT) 24 Fort Smith

=== Analog-to-digital conversion ===
KFSM-TV ended regular programming on its analog signal, over VHF channel 5, on June 12, 2009, the official date on which full-power television stations in the United States transitioned from analog to digital broadcasts under federal mandate. The station's digital signal remained on its pre-transition UHF channel 18, using virtual channel 5.
