= KGTO-TV =

Television station in Fayetteville, Arkansas (1969–1973)

- Fayetteville, Arkansas; United States
- Channels: Analog: 36 (UHF)

Ownership
- Owner: Noark Investments, Inc.

History
- First air date: February 8, 1969
- Last air date: December 23, 1973
- Former affiliations: NBC (1969–1972); CBS (1972–1973)

Technical information
- ERP: 1,950 kW
- HAAT: 820 ft (250 m)
- Transmitter coordinates: 36°01′02″N 94°05′04″W

KGTO-TV was a television station on channel 36 in Fayetteville, Arkansas, United States. The station, which operated from 1969 to 1973, was owned by Noark Broadcasting and maintained studios at 200 West Center Street in Fayetteville.

After the station went silent in 1973 pending sale, the license was sold to George T. Hernreich, owner of Fort Smith's KFPW-TV (now KHBS), and modified for channel 29. The station re-emerged on December 5, 1977, as KTVP (now KHOG-TV), a full-time satellite of KFPW-TV.

== History ==
On May 8, 1968, the Federal Communications Commission (FCC) issued Noark a construction permit for channel 36, which would broadcast with an effective radiated power of 1,450 kW from Robinson Mountain. The construction of the station was delayed due to a short circuit in the station's transmission line. In January 1969, a 19-year-old engineer suffered frostbite and had to be rescued from atop the 350-foot (110 m) tower, then hospitalized. Channel 36 began telecasts as a primary NBC affiliate and secondary CBS affiliate on February 8, though its NBC affiliation agreement stipulated no compensation for carrying network programs. The full NBC schedule was available on cable, via KVOO-TV in Tulsa, Oklahoma (now KJRH-TV), KOAM-TV in Joplin, Missouri (now CBS), or KYTV-TV in Springfield, Missouri.

By July, one of the partners in Noark, Weldon Stamps, pulled out, leaving the station owned by Paul Milam Sr. and Jr., E.J. Ball, and Tom Cowan. Noark also contended with a lease for faulty equipment that it had assumed from Oklahoma City's defunct KLPR-TV. Not long after signing on, KGTO found that the equipment from Visual Electronics Corporation was deficient and ceased making lease payments; in March 1971, a federal judge found that Visual knew the equipment was defective, a judgment reaffirmed the next year in appeals court in KLPR-TV, Inc., vs. Visual Electronics Corporation.

Since NBC refused to provide KGTO with a network feed, the station was forced to switch to and from the signals of other affiliates over-the-air whenever network programming aired. When KGTO invoked network non-duplication of other network affiliates on the Trans-Video cable system in Fayetteville in February 1971, viewers complained that the network feed from KGTO, now replacing other network affiliates on the cable system, was of poor quality. The next month, the NBC affiliate in Little Rock, KARK-TV, sued KGTO for $7,805 in unpaid fees for using KARK as a source of NBC programming, pursuant to an agreement between the stations. Another lawsuit followed in May, when film distributor Screen Gems sued Noark for over $25,000 over a reorganization into an investment company that affected contracts for movies and cartoons.

In 1972, KGTO became a full-time CBS affiliate, simulcasting Little Rock's KTHV for most network programming. It was short-lived, due to the station continuing to demonstrate further financial troubles by cutting back its schedule. On January 22, 1973, KGTO began signing on the air only at 5:30 pm on weekdays. Fayetteville residents could view full-time CBS programming on KOTV in Tulsa or KUHI-TV in Joplin (now NBC affiliate KSNF) via cable. That May, Noark filed to sell the station to George T. Hernreich, owner of Fort Smith's KFPW-TV (channel 40). Hernreich intended to convert KGTO into a full-time satellite of KFPW-TV. Since signing on in 1971, KFPW-TV had been more or less unviewable in Fayetteville and points north; channel 40's transmitter in Fort Smith provided secondary coverage of Fayetteville's southern suburbs but just missed Fayetteville itself.

Final FCC approval of the sale to Hernreich languished at the FCC due to concerns over Hernreich's operation of KAIT-TV in Jonesboro. When it was apparent that the sale would not be approved quickly, Hernreich took KGTO-TV off the air on December 23, 1973, intending to resume operations within 24 hours of receiving approval. In the meantime, equipment was stolen from the KGTO transmitter site on Robinson Mountain. The sale was consummated in 1975, and the FCC cleared Hernreich of character issues in February 1976.

While Hernreich finally owned KGTO (which changed its call letters to KTVP on January 17, 1977), he soon found other issues. An entirely new transmission facility had to be built at Robinson Mountain due to damage and further theft. An application was made on February 21, 1976, for a new facility. However, Hernreich procured equipment designed for channel 29, not 36; stating that a change would "permit restoration of service quickly and save approximately $100,000 in additional capital", Hernreich requested channel 29 to be substituted for 36 at Fayetteville, requiring modifications to three other allotments regionally. On December 5, 1977, KTVP signed on the air on channel 29 as a satellite of KFPW-TV. The two stations are today KHOG-TV and KHBS, respectively. While KHBS is still the main station, its studios are based in Rogers on the Northwest Arkansas side of the market.
