= KFTA-TV =

Television station in Fort Smith, Arkansas

- Fort Smith–Fayetteville, Arkansas; United States
- City: Fort Smith, Arkansas
- Channels: Digital: 27 (UHF); Virtual: 24
- Branding: Fox 24

Programming
- Affiliations: 24.1: Fox; 24.2: NBC/KNWA-TV; 34.1: MyNetworkTV/KXNW; for others, see § Subchannels

Ownership
- Owner: Nexstar Media Group; (Nexstar Media Inc.)
- Sister stations: KNWA-TV, KXNW; Tegna: KFSM-TV

History
- First air date: November 12, 1978
- Former call signs: KLMN (1978–1982); KPOM-TV (1982–2004)
- Former channel number: Analog: 24 (UHF, 1978–2008)
- Former affiliations: CBS (1978–1980); NBC (1980–2006)
- Call sign meaning: Fort (Smith), Arkansas

Technical information
- Licensing authority: FCC
- Facility ID: 29560
- ERP: 600 kW
- HAAT: 305 m (1,001 ft)
- Transmitter coordinates: 35°42′36″N 94°8′16″W
- Translator(s): KNWA-TV 51.2 Rogers

Links
- Public license information: Public file; LMS
- Website: www.nwahomepage.com

KFTA-TV (channel 24) is a television station licensed to Fort Smith, Arkansas, United States, serving as the Fox affiliate for the Arkansas River Valley and Northwest Arkansas. It is owned by Nexstar Media Group alongside KNWA-TV (channel 51), an NBC affiliate, and KXNW (channel 34), an independent station with MyNetworkTV. Nexstar's Tegna subsidiary owns CBS affiliate KFSM-TV (channel 5). KFTA-TV, KNWA-TV and KXNW share studios at the Underwood Building on Dickson Street in downtown Fayetteville. KFTA-TV's transmitter is located on Cartwright Mountain, south of Artist Point; KFTA's programming is also broadcast from KNWA-TV's transmitter southeast of Garfield, Arkansas, as one of its subchannels and vice versa.

Channel 24 was the third commercial station to be activated in Fort Smith. It began broadcasting as KLMN on November 12, 1978, and was a CBS affiliate with studios on Kelley Highway, changing affiliations to NBC in 1980. Built by MCM Broadcasting, a company in which Jim and Rob Walton were part-owners, the station was sold to the Schindler family of Houston in 1980 and renamed KPOM-TV in 1982. From 1986 to 2003, KPOM-TV was owned and operated by Griffin TV. Griffin invested in the news department. To improve KPOM-TV's poor reception in fast-growing Northwest Arkansas, it acquired the construction permit for channel 51 in Rogers and built it as KFAA, a satellite station, in 1989. However, the station remained third in local news ratings. The original news department was disbanded in 1992, but Griffin relaunched news in 2000 in conjunction with opening a studio in downtown Fayetteville.

Nexstar took over management of KPOM–KFAA in 2004 before buying the stations outright from Griffin. It changed the stations' call signs to KFTA-TV and KNWA-TV, respectively, and concentrated its resources on the more populous, more affluent, and faster-growing Northwest Arkansas portion of the market. The Fort Smith operation was reopened from 2006 to 2011 in conjunction with KFTA splitting off as a Fox affiliate and a never-consummated sale to Mission Broadcasting. KNWA-TV produces 7 a.m. and 5:30 and 9 p.m. local newscasts for air on KFTA-TV.

== History ==
=== Early history ===
MCM Television received a construction permit from the Federal Communications Commission (FCC) to build a television station on channel 24 in Fort Smith on March 14, 1975. The station bore the call sign KLMN. In 1977, Jim and Rob Walton acquired a 20-percent stake. The station was announced to be beginning construction that December, and in May 1978, it received the primary CBS affiliation for the market. The existing CBS affiliate in Northwest Arkansas, the combination of KFPW-TV 40 and KTVP 29, had been negotiating with ABC, of which the CBS network became aware, prompting the move to the new KLMN. As a result, while the station was still under construction, the full CBS schedule was not available in Fort Smith. This completed Fort Smith's transition from a one-station market—where KFSM-TV (channel 5) had affiliations with all three networks—to a three-station market.

KLMN began broadcasting on November 12, 1978. It had studios on Kelley Highway and a tower on Cartwright Mountain, midway between Fort Smith and Fayetteville, where the station had a news bureau. KLMN became an NBC affiliate in 1980 after KFSM-TV was purchased by The New York Times Company, which accepted an offer by CBS to change its affiliation. The Times owned two other CBS affiliates. That year, MCM agreed to sell the station to Houston-based Schindler Broadcasting Company for $950,000 and assumption of debts; in comparison, KFSM-TV had sold for $17.5 million. The FCC approved the transfer in May 1981. On September 22, 1982, the station changed its call sign to KPOM-TV. The designation stood for "People on the Move" and came from a viewer contest.

=== The Griffin years ===
Ozark Broadcasting, under which Schindler reorganized, sold KPOM-TV to Griffin TV of Oklahoma City in a deal announced in August 1985 and filed in November as a $6.24 million transaction. Griffin overhauled the news department, relaunching the newscasts that had been known as 24 Express News as Newsline 24.

Shortly after taking control, Griffin agreed to acquire the construction permit for KFAA (channel 51) at Rogers, Arkansas, to serve as a semi-satellite for Northwest Arkansas. KPOM-TV's penetration of the area—rapidly growing and affluent—was poor. The permit had been held by Mike McCutcheon, whom Griffin hired to be the general sales manager and eventually general manager; McCutcheon had found no party willing to finance construction of the station on a standalone basis. Over an objection from KSNF-TV in Joplin, Missouri, which claimed the combination would have excessive overlap and signal loss issues, the FCC approved the transfer in December 1988. KFAA began broadcasting on August 23, 1989, and the station's newscasts were retitled Newsline 24/51. The 12-person Fayetteville bureau was replaced with a partially separate, 25- to 30-person operation in Rogers, and the station began presenting its newscasts in a dual-city format with an anchor in both cities, an approach already used by channels 40/29. Except for Mike Nail, the Fayetteville-based sports director who doubled as the voice of Arkansas Razorbacks athletics, most of the on-air news staff turned over.

One thing that did not change was that KPOM–KFAA rated third in the full market, often by distant margins compared to KFSM and KHBS/KHOG. However, its ratings status was higher in Benton County, the county containing Rogers, which was reassigned to the Fort Smith–Fayetteville market from Joplin, Missouri, in 1989. In 1991, Griffin agreed to sell KPOM–KFAA to Newark Broadcasting; it had been attempting to sell the pair since late 1989. In anticipation of the move, the station relaunched its newscasts as Eyewitness News in September. The new format included a split segment of news for Northwest Arkansas viewers, though most of the program still originated from Fort Smith. Citing a lack of demand for their news product, Griffin shuttered the KPOM–KFAA news operation effective June 12, 1992, resulting in the dismissal of 22 employees in Fort Smith and Rogers.

A proposed transfer of KPOM and KFAA to Northwest Arkansas Broadcasting was filed with the FCC in September 1992. The buyer's owners were beneficiaries of the Robert Hernreich family trust; Robert was the son of George Hernreich, primary owner of KHBS/KHOG. The New York Times Company objected, believing this created an ownership complication that gave the Hernreichs a then-illegal duopoly and control over both stations. The application was never acted on by the FCC and was withdrawn in March 1993.

After the Northwest Arkansas Broadcasting sale fell through, Griffin opted to retain KPOM and KFAA. In December 1999, Griffin announced that it had agreed to lease space in the former Campbell-Bell department store in downtown Fayetteville, which was being renovated, and intended to restart local news production from the site. Griffin saw the potential for higher revenue in the market than had been possible when the news department was dissolved in 1992. Nail, who had worked at KHBS/KHOG after KPOM–KFAA ceased producing news, returned as sportscaster, while two other KHBS/KHOG personalities—weatherman Steve Gibbs and reporter Rhonda Justice—moved over to the new news department, which began offering newscasts on August 3, 2000. In its return, the station again placed third in local news ratings.

=== Nexstar ownership ===
After the FCC relaxed limits on TV station ownership, Griffin received more inquiries from potential buyers of KPOM and KFAA. In September 2003, it announced it was negotiating with Nexstar Broadcasting Group. The next month, the companies entered into a letter of intent, and Nexstar assumed management duties under a time brokerage agreement.

Nexstar immediately moved to shift station operations from Fort Smith to Fayetteville, as Northwest Arkansas now represented the majority of the media market's population. In February 2004, the Fayetteville facility became the main studio, and two public affairs programs produced in Fort Smith—one of which had been on the air on channel 24 since 1978—were canceled. In August, the reporter and photographer assigned to cover news in Fort Smith were moved to Fayetteville, though the station promised to cover news in Fort Smith on an as-needed basis. On August 13, 2004, both stations changed call signs: KPOM-TV to KFTA-TV and KFAA to KNWA-TV. The changes made viewers in the Arkansas River Valley feel like the station had left them behind, even though it had introduced Fort Smith–specific weather forecasts shortly afterward. The mayor of Fort Smith, Ray Baker, called the move "a mistake" that would lead to less coverage of what was then the second-largest city in Arkansas. Some business operations were consolidated at Little Rock, where Nexstar owned KARK-TV.

=== As a Fox affiliate ===
On April 19, 2006, Nexstar Broadcasting Group announced it would sell KFTA-TV to Brecksville, Ohio–based Mission Broadcasting, a group which maintained joint sales and shared services agreements with Nexstar-operated outlets in other cities, for $5.6 million. Under the terms of the agreement, KFTA would continue to be operated by Nexstar under agreement but would split from KNWA to broadcast Fox on a full-power signal as well as a prime time local newscast. Mission leased the Kelley Highway offices and renovated them to house its operation. The area's existing Fox affiliate was a low-power station, KPBI-CA (channel 46). KPBI-CA's affiliation agreement let Fox move its programming to a full-power station, such as KFTA-TV, on 90 days' notice. Its owner, Equity Broadcasting, challenged the sale of KFTA with the FCC, claiming the move would result in an unauthorized duopoly. While the challenge was pending, KFTA became a Fox affiliate on August 28. Until the license challenge was to be settled, KFTA continued to simulcast KNWA from 7 a.m. to 5 p.m. KFTA was only available in Fayetteville and KNWA in Fort Smith using digital subchannels. Coinciding with the switch to Fox, KFTA began airing a 9 p.m. newscast on weeknights concentrating on Fort Smith–area news. Even though the FCC approved the transaction in 2008 (admonishing Nexstar for making false claims and barring them from simulcasting each other's digital signals), Mission never acquired KFTA, and in 2019, Nexstar acquired another Northwest Arkansas–market station, KXNW (channel 34). It was able to do so because the FCC recognized KNWA-TV as operating as a satellite of KFTA-TV under a waiver.

KFTA shut its Fort Smith office in 2011 and moved all operations to Fayetteville. In October 2012, KNWA–KFTA relocated its operations into its current facility at the Dickson condominium complex on West Dickson Street, occupying approximately 12,000 square feet (1,100 m^{2}) of studio space on the third floor of the building. After moving into the Dickson facility, Nexstar expanded news production on KFTA to include a 7 a.m. morning news extension, a 5:30 p.m. newscast, and prime time newscasts on weekends.

== Technical information ==
=== Subchannels ===
KFTA-TV's transmitter is located on Cartwright Mountain near Artist Point; KNWA-TV's transmitter is southeast of Garfield. KFTA-TV and KNWA-TV broadcast two shared channels (Fox on 24.1 and 51.2 and NBC on 24.2 and 51.1) and two unique diginets each. Also broadcast on the KFTA-TV multiplex is a simulcast of KXNW, whose own signal does not reach the Fort Smith area.

Subchannels of KFTA-TV
Subchannel	Res.	Short name	Programming
24.1	720p	KFTA-DT	Fox
24.2	1080i	KNWA-DT	NBC (KNWA-TV)
24.3	480p	Mystery	Ion Mystery
24.4	480p	CourtTV	Court TV → Outlaw (soon)
34.1	720p	KXNW-DT	MyNetworkTV (KXNW)

Simulcast of subchannels of another station

=== Analog-to-digital conversion ===
KFTA-TV discontinued regular programming on its analog signal (over UHF channel 24) in November 2008, due to the failure of its analog transmitter. The station's digital signal remained on its pre-transition UHF channel 27, using virtual channel 24.
