= KHBS =

Television station in Fort Smith, Arkansas

KHBS and KHOG-TV
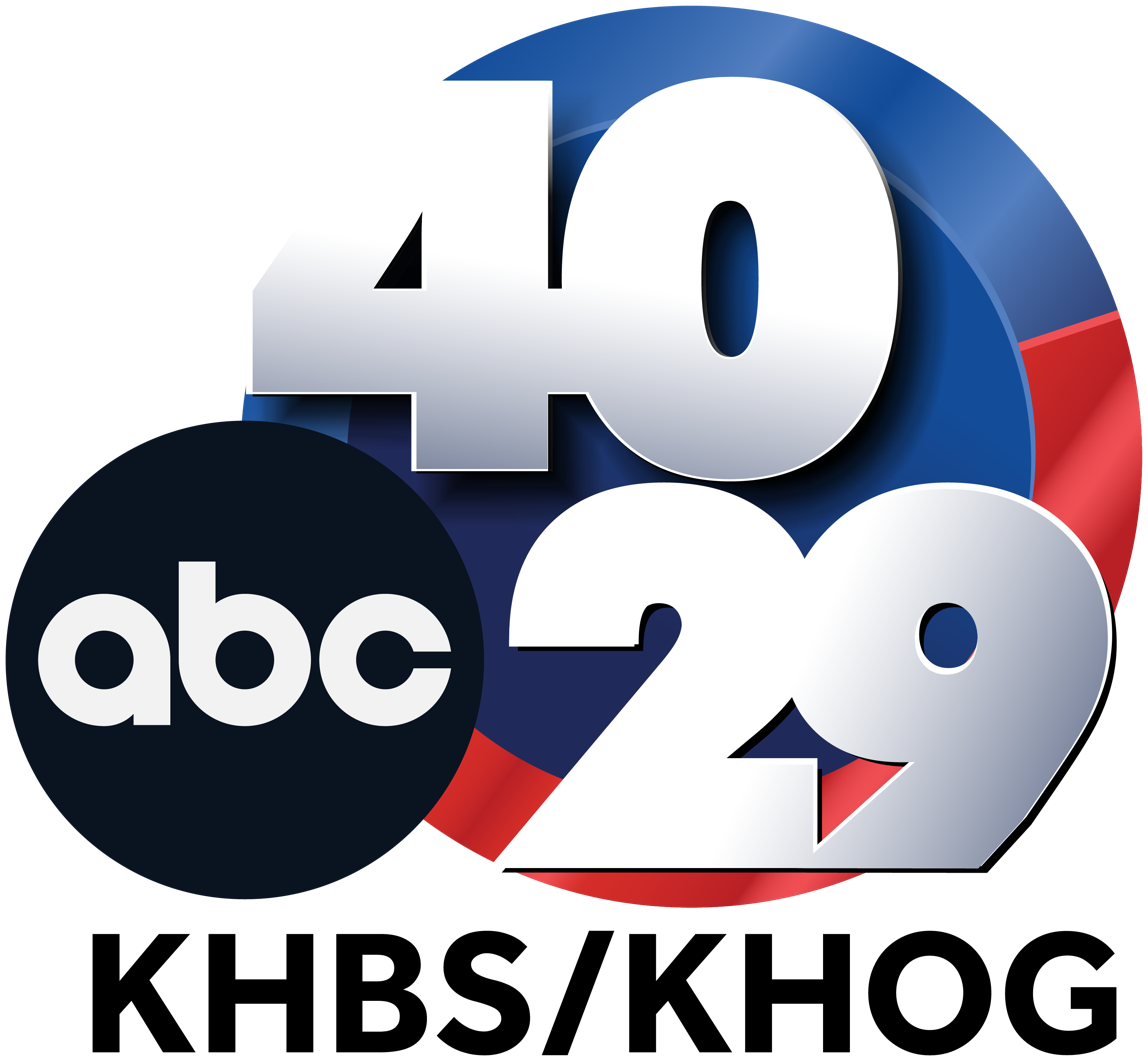

KHBS: Fort Smith, Arkansas; KHOG-TV: Fayetteville, Arkansas; United States
- Channels for KHBS: Digital: 21 (UHF); Virtual: 40
- Channels for KHOG-TV: Digital: 15 (UHF); Virtual: 29
- Branding: 40/29; Arkansas CW (40.2/29.2)

Programming
- Affiliations: 40.1/29.1: ABC; 40.2/29.2: The CW Plus; for others, see § Technical information

Ownership
- Owner: Hearst Television; (Arkansas Hearst Television Inc.)

History
- First air date: KHBS: July 28, 1971; KHOG-TV: December 5, 1977 (Note: Not counting the operational history of KGTO-TV, which is the same license.)
- Former call signs: KHBS: KFPW-TV (1971–1983); KHOG-TV: KTVP (1977–1987)
- Former channel number: KHBS: Analog: 40 (UHF, 1971–2009); KHOG-TV: Analog: 29 (UHF, 1977–2009)
- Former affiliations: KHBS: CBS (1971–1978); KHOG-TV: CBS (1977–1978)
- Call sign meaning: KHBS: Hernreich Broadcasting Stations (founding owner); KHOG-TV: Hog (mascot for the University of Arkansas)

Technical information
- Licensing authority: FCC
- Facility ID: KHBS: 60353; KHOG-TV: 60354
- ERP: KHBS: 325 kW; KHOG-TV: 180 kW
- HAAT: KHBS: 602 m (1,975 ft); KHOG-TV: 266 m (873 ft)
- Transmitter coordinates: KHBS: 35°4′15.5″N 94°40′44″W; KHOG-TV: 36°0′57″N 94°5′0″W

Links
- Public license information: KHBS: Public file; LMS; KHOG-TV: Public file; LMS
- Website: www.4029tv.com

KHBS (channel 40) in Fort Smith, Arkansas, and KHOG-TV (channel 29) in Fayetteville, Arkansas, together known as "40/29", are television stations affiliated with ABC and The CW Plus, serving the Arkansas River Valley and Northwest Arkansas. Owned by Hearst Television, the stations maintain studios on Ajax Avenue in Rogers. KHBS's transmitter is located on Cavanal Hill in northwestern LeFlore County, Oklahoma (northwest of Poteau), while KHOG-TV's tower sits near Ed Edwards Road in rural northeastern Washington County, Arkansas, just southeast of the Fayetteville city limits.

Channel 40 in Fort Smith began broadcasting on July 28, 1971, as KFPW-TV, the city's second TV station. It was built by George T. Hernreich; initially airing second-choice programming from all of the Big Three networks, it became a primary CBS affiliate in 1973 and a sole ABC affiliate in 1978. In 1977, KFPW-TV's programming began to be rebroadcast in Fayetteville by KTVP on channel 29, the former KGTO-TV (channel 36) with new facilities and equipment. This expanded 40/29's reach to Northwest Arkansas, a market where it would later find a substantial viewership base. The stations changed call signs to KHBS and KHOG-TV in 1983 and 1987, respectively.

Hernreich family members owned 40/29 until 1996, when it was acquired by Argyle Television, which merged into Hearst in 1998. It has remained competitive in news ratings with KFSM-TV, whose traditional viewership base is in the Arkansas River Valley.

== History ==
George T. Hernreich trading as KFPW Broadcasting Company, owner of Fort Smith radio station KFPW (1230 AM), applied to build a station on channel 24 on March 15, 1967. The Federal Communications Commission (FCC) designated his application and a second from a consortium known as Broadcasters Unlimited for comparative hearing on March 11, 1968, after which Hernreich amended his application to specify channel 40. The FCC granted Hernreich a construction permit on May 28, 1969.

KFPW-TV began airing limited programming on July 28, 1971, from studios on Albert Pike in Fort Smith. It was the first time that the Fort Smith market had two competing stations in more than 15 years. It aired programs from all three major networks: ABC, CBS, and NBC. At the time, Fort Smith's other TV station, KFSM-TV (channel 5), did likewise: KFPW-TV aired ten ABC prime-time programs, eight from CBS, and five from NBC in the fall 1971 television season. This arrangement ended in 1973, when KFPW-TV obtained first call rights to CBS programming, which was supplemented by ABC.

Channel 40 had been allowed to go on the air by the FCC amid an investigation into practices at Hernreich's other TV station, KAIT in Jonesboro. KAIT was being investigated in a bribery scandal involving ABC, and the FCC conditioned approval of a final broadcast license for KFPW-TV on the outcome of its Jonesboro hearing. In April 1973, FCC administrative law judge Forest L. McClenning ruled that Hernreich should lose the licenses for both stations. He found that Hernreich lacked the qualifications to be a broadcast licensee, putting his other holdings—two AM radio stations and an FM outlet in other Arkansas cities—in peril. McClenning rejected allegations from Hernreich that the payments were made on threat of losing the ABC affiliation for KAIT-TV. On appeal to the FCC in 1974, Hernreich won a license for KFPW-TV and was found to be generally qualified, but the commission on a 3-2 vote denied a license renewal for KAIT-TV; that decision was reversed five years later.

During this time, Hernreich made arrangements to buy a station in Fayetteville. In May 1973, Hernreich filed to buy KGTO-TV from Noark Investments to convert it to a satellite station of KFPW-TV. KGTO-TV went off the air that December awaiting approval of the sale. Hernreich received conditional approval to buy the station in 1975, dependent on the outcome of the other proceedings, as well as approval to build an FM station in Fort Smith in 1976. To save costs, Hernreich successfully petitioned the FCC to change KGTO-TV from channel 36 to channel 29, and the station returned to the air as KTVP on December 5, 1977, with local studios in Fayetteville's McIlroy Plaza. The Fayetteville operation later moved to quarters on Church Street.

Fort Smith received a third local TV station in 1978 when KLMN (channel 24) began. Ahead of it going on the air, Hernreich held talks with ABC and CBS for exclusive affiliation. When CBS heard of this, they decided to cut ties with KFPW–KTVP; this left the stations to sign with ABC, which Hernreich believed "would be the main vibrant force in network television for the next five years". Channel 24 then affiliated with CBS. When the Hernreichs sold their Fort Smith radio holdings in 1983, the KFPW call sign stayed with the radio station, and channel 40 changed to KHBS, reflecting its parent, Hernreich Broadcasting Stations. That same year, Hernreich completed construction on new Fayetteville studios and upgraded the channel 40 transmitter facility. In 1985, George Hernreich sold KHBS–KTVP to Sigma Broadcasting, controlled by his children Cynthia and Robert Hernreich, separating the television station from Hernreich's remaining radio interests in Hot Springs. KTVP became KHOG-TV in 1987.

Argyle Television of San Antonio, Texas, purchased KHBS–KHOG from Sigma in 1996. In August 1997, Argyle merged with the Hearst Corporation's broadcasting unit to form what was then known as Hearst-Argyle Television. (Note: The name continued until 2009, when the Hearst Corporation acquired Argyle's stake in the venture, took it private, and renamed it Hearst Television.) After years of maintaining its operations in facilities in Fort Smith and Fayetteville, Hearst-Argyle opened a new, 12,900-square-foot (1,200 m^{2}) studio in Rogers in 2007, as growth in Northwest Arkansas and particularly Benton County outpaced the Fort Smith area.

KHBS and KHOG began broadcasting The CW as subchannels on April 28, 2008. Previously, CW programming was not available even on cable because the market lacked a local affiliate and the network denied Cox Communications permission to offer a direct network feed to subscribers. Arkansas CW was provided in high definition beginning in 2012.

== News operation ==
Historically, the media market was dominated by Fort Smith and KFSM-TV. In 1983, KFSM-TV had a 50-percent audience share for its 6 p.m. newscast and KHBS/KTVP 6 percent. That year, Craig Cannon joined 40/29 from KTUL in Tulsa, Oklahoma, beginning a 37-year tenure with the station. As the growth in population in the region shifted to the Fayetteville area and under Darrel Cunningham, who came to 40/29 from KAIT in 1985, KHBS/KTVP was the principal beneficiary. Its newscast format split the anchors between Fort Smith and Fayetteville, much like the old NBC newscast The Huntley–Brinkley Report, and was later adopted by KFSM and KPOM/KFAA. In July 1989, KHBS/KHOG passed KFSM for the first time in 6 p.m. news ratings and total-day audience share. That year, Benton County was moved from the Joplin, Missouri, television market to Northwest Arkansas. This geographic shift forced KFSM to shuffle its news operation to better serve viewers beyond the Arkansas River Valley as KHBS/KHOG's strategy of establishing itself in Northwest Arkansas reaped gains in ratings. Between 1983 and 1991, the KHBS/KHOG news department grew from 10 employees to 38. In the mid-1990s, 40/29 aired partially separate Fort Smith and Fayetteville newscasts.

KFSM and KHBS/KHOG became the top two news stations in the market, with KFSM stronger in Fort Smith and KHBS/KHOG stronger in the Northwest Arkansas component of the market (Benton and Washington counties) and among younger viewers. In 2003, KHBS/KHOG had twice as many viewers in Northwest Arkansas as KFSM-TV, yet it was second in the full 11-county designated market area (DMA). In 2014, KFSM had commanding leads in the DMA in most news time slots.

Over the course of the 2010s, KHBS added news coverage. The weekday morning newscast, 40/29 News Sunrise, was expanded to 2 1/2 hours in 2011. Weekend morning newscasts were added the following year. Arkansas CW began airing newscasts in 2012, when a 9 p.m. half-hour newscast debuted. A morning news extension debuted in 2016, followed by half-hour Saturday and Sunday early evening newscasts in 2017. A 4 p.m. newscast was added on the main channel in 2024.

=== Notable former on-air staff ===
- Sharyn Alfonsi

== Technical information ==
Coverage areas of KHBS (red) and KHOG-TV (blue)

The KHBS transmitter is located on Cavanal Hill near Poteau, Oklahoma. The KHOG-TV transmitter is located on Robinson Mountain, southeast of Fayetteville. The stations' signals are multiplexed with three shared subchannels and two unique subchannels:

Subchannels of KHBS
Subchannel	Res.	Short name	Programming
40.1	720p	KHBS-DT	ABC
40.2	720p	ARK-CW	The CW Plus
40.3	480i	MeTV-AR	MeTV
40.4	480i	STORY	Story Television

Subchannels of KHOG-TV
Subchannel	Res.	Short name	Programming
29.1	1080i	KHOG-DT	ABC
29.2	720p	ARK-CW	The CW Plus
29.3	480i	MeTV-HD	MeTV
29.4	480i	Ion	Ion Plus
29.5	480i	HSN	HSN

=== Analog-to-digital conversion ===
Both stations ended regular programming on their analog signals, respectively on June 12, 2009, the official date on which full-power television stations in the United States transitioned from analog to digital broadcasts under federal mandate. The station's digital channel allocations post-transition are as follows:

- KHBS ended regular programming on its analog signal, over UHF channel 40; the station's digital signal remained on its pre-transition UHF channel 21, using virtual channel 40.
- KHOG-TV ended regular programming on its analog signal, over UHF channel 29; the station's digital signal remained on its pre-transition UHF channel 15, using virtual channel 29.
