= KFPW (AM) =

- Fort Smith, Arkansas; United States
- Broadcast area: Northwest Arkansas
- Frequency: 1230 kHz
- Branding: The Marshal 1230 AM

Programming
- Format: Talk radio
- Affiliations: Fox Sports Radio; Salem Radio Network

Ownership
- Owner: Pharis Broadcasting, Inc.
- Sister stations: KFPW-FM

History
- First air date: 1924

Technical information
- Licensing authority: FCC
- Facility ID: 23868
- Class: C
- Power: 1,000 watts
- Transmitter coordinates: 35°23′30.3″N 94°19′54.8″W
- Translator: 98.7 K254AM (Fort Smith)

Links
- Public license information: Public file; LMS
- Webcast: Listen live
- Website: themarshal1035fm.com

KFPW (1230 kHz, "The Marshal") is a commercial AM radio station broadcasting a talk radio format to the Northwest Arkansas area. The station is licensed to Pharis Broadcasting, Inc which is owned by William L. Pharis and Karen A. Pharis.

== History ==
=== From Missouri to Arkansas (1924–1928) ===
In May 1924, Rev. Lannie Wright Stewart began KFPW from the parsonage at his church, St. John Methodist Episcopal Church, South, in Carterville, Missouri. It had a 20-watt transmitter (common then, but considered low power by modern standards), on 1160 kHz frequency. Its slogan was "Keeping Pace with Christ Means Progress" and it broadcast only a few hours each week, with popular programming and Stewart's Sunday morning church service.

It was supported by donations from John Brown College (now John Brown University in Siloam Springs, Arkansas).

=== John Brown University (1928–1930) ===
In 1928, John Elward Brown had two schools in Arkansas: John Brown College in Siloam Springs, and John Brown University in Sulphur Springs. The two towns are 20 miles (32 km) apart. The College hired Stewart to head a new Department of Instruction and Broadcast, and he moved the station's equipment to Sulphur Springs, and then to Siloam Springs. The license was issued to John Brown College with Stewart named as the manager.

Ten months after moving to Siloam Springs, Stewart filed another request to move the station back to Carterville. There were conflicting claims on the ownership of the equipment. The Court of Appeals in Washington, D.C. investigated (Lannie W. Stewart v. Commission, No. 5158), and the case was voluntarily dismissed with the station licensed to John Brown schools, to operate on 1340 kHz, with 50 watts power, during daytime hours.

Wright retired from the ministry due to a throat ailment, and moved to Nashville, Tennessee to run a gas station. Brown sold the radio station.

=== Goldman Hotel (1930–1950) ===
Siloam Springs and Sulphur Springs were rural areas, and the radio transmission was not powerful enough to reach many people, so Brown sold the station in 1930 to Goldman Hotel, which was owned by Southwestern Hotels Company. In about 1930, KFPW's tower was moved to 1213 Garrison St., Fort Smith Arkansas. In 1932, its frequency changed from 1340 to 1210 kHz, power increased to 100 watts, and it was allowed unlimited broadcast times instead of just daytime hours.

The Goldman Hotel was known for its expensive hotel rooms and offices, with spaces big enough to host conventions and professional organizations, and dances held in the evenings with live orchestras. KFPW broadcast the live music from the top floors of the hotel.

=== Griffin Grocery Company (1950–1958) ===
One of KFPW's advertisers was Griffin Grocery Company, which advertised Polar Bear coffee. In the 1940s, J.T. Griffin bought KOMA and KTUL and had affiliated with the Columbia Broadcasting System (CBS). KFPW was Griffin's third station, paying $50,000 (equivalent to $515,530 in 2025 dollars) for the station and then moving the station to a new building. They bought it to promote Polar Bear Coffee with shows like "Polar Bear Coffee News". KFPW also became a CBS affiliate, which brought a wider audience: Griffin Grocery claimed to have 100% distribution of Polar Bear Coffee in Fort Smith by 1952, which they attributed to their radio advertising.

=== George Hernreich (1958–2003) ===
In 1958, Griffin Grocery sold KFPW to George T. Hernreich, a local businessman who owned Esquire Jewelers, which primarily sold and repaired watches for military personnel stationed at Camp Chaffee. Hernreich paid $75,000 (equivalent to $623,658 in 2025 dollars) for the station, at about the same time he sold his 50% interest in KNAC-TV.

After Hernreich's death, KFPW was sold briefly to Prime, LLC, and then sold to Pharis Broadcasting.
