= Artist Point, Arkansas =

- Unincorporated community
- Location within Arkansas Location within the United States
- Coordinates: 35°43′11″N 94°08′15″W
- Country: United States
- State: Arkansas
- County: Crawford
- Elevation: 1,614 ft (492 m)
- Time zone: UTC-6 (Central (CST))
  - Summer (DST): UTC-5 (CDT)
- Area code: 479
- GNIS feature ID: 70468

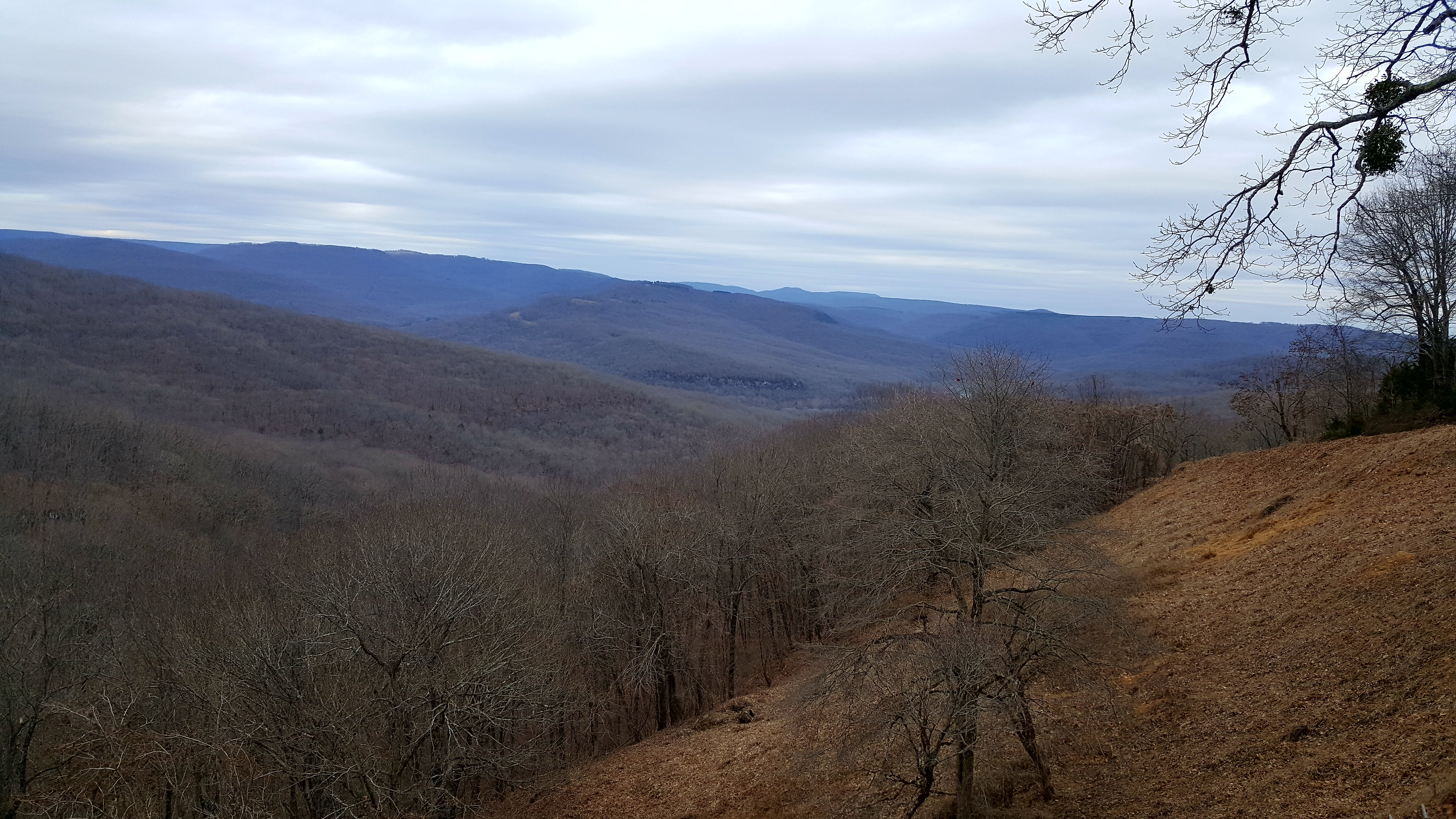
Artist Point, Arkansas

Artist Point is an unincorporated community in Crawford County, Arkansas, United States. Artist Point is located along U.S. Route 71, 6 miles (9.7 km) north-northeast of Mountainburg.
