= KPBI-CA =

Television station in Fort Smith, Arkansas (1995–2008)

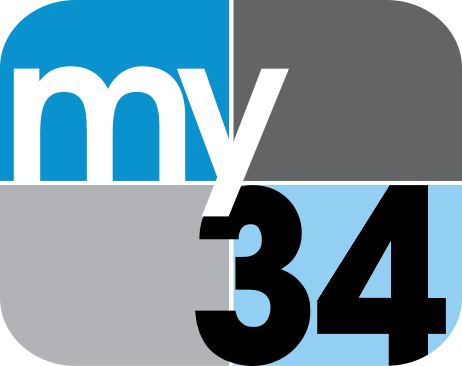
- Fort Smith, Arkansas; United States
- Channels: Analog: 46 (UHF)
- Branding: My 34

Programming
- Affiliations: Independent (May−September 1995, August–September 2006); UPN (September 1995−2001); Fox (2001–August 2006); MyNetworkTV (September 2006−2008)

Ownership
- Owner: Equity Media Holdings; (Fort Smith 46, Inc., debtor-in-possession)

History
- First air date: May 23, 1995
- Last air date: March 28, 2008; (12 years, 310 days)
- Former call signs: K32ED (May−December 1995); KFDF-LP (December 1995−2001); KPBI−LP (2001−2002)
- Former channel numbers: 32 (UHF, 1995−2001)
- Call sign meaning: Pharis Broadcasting Inc. (original owners)

Technical information
- Licensing authority: FCC
- Facility ID: 52429
- Class: CA
- ERP: 32 kW
- Transmitter coordinates: 35°26′50.9″N 94°21′53.7″W
- Translator(s): see § Repeaters

Links
- Public license information: Public file; LMS

KPBI-CA (channel 46) was a low-power, Class A television station in Fort Smith, Arkansas, United States, which was last affiliated with MyNetworkTV. It was owned by Equity Media Holdings and, like many of the company's stations, was controlled remotely via satellite from Equity's headquarters in Little Rock, Arkansas, and was relayed via the satellite Galaxy 18 (K_{u} band transponder 21). The station's programming was also available on channel 34 from Eureka Springs, which shared the KPBI call sign and was attainable over the air in Fort Smith.

== History ==
KPBI signed on as independent station K32ED on channel 32 in May 1995. It switched to UPN in September, and changed its callsign to KFDF-LP in December. It also had translators on channel 32 covering Fort Smith and surrounding areas and channel 36, which covered Springdale and its associated area. In October 2001, KFDF-LP moved to channel 46 and changed its callsign to KPBI-LP, as well as changing its affiliation to Fox. This resulted in the original KPBI, which served as Northwest Arkansas's Fox affiliate since 1991 on channel 46, moving to channel 10 and obtaining the KFDF calls. Tulsa's KOKI-TV previously served as the Fox outlet for Northwest Arkansas before the original KPBI's launch.

KPBI was the flagship station for a network of low-power television stations owned and operated by Bill and Karen Pharis. This station served the Fort Smith area, and its transmitter was located at Mt. Vista in Van Buren, Arkansas. It was followed by channel 15, which served Springdale, Arkansas, and its surrounding areas. KPBI eventually added several other low-power translators that extended the coverage area to Mt. Magazine in the east, Poteau Mountain to the west and south (located in Poteau, Oklahoma) and Rogers, Arkansas, to the north. This gave an equal coverage area to that of the other local high-power stations.

KPBI carried Fox programming in the evening and various syndicated offerings during the daytime hours. It also made an inroad in coverage of college sports events that were not otherwise made available to the public–for example Westark Lions basketball and baseball, and Lady Razorbacks basketball. During its Fox heyday, KPBI was the operating station for the "Foxstar" satellite truck.

KPBI was known locally as a more "unstructured" station in on-air operations. This was demonstrated by various events such as off-the-path programming, strange video effects (i.e. the "dropping of sheep", which was a Video Toaster effect that would make sheep fall down into the video signal) and the use of substantially all employees as either on-air talent or as voices for commercials and tags. Also of interest is that KPBI used devices such as the Video Toaster and cable spot insertion equipment as primary switchers, commercial production gear and the like, proving that a working television station could be operated without high-dollar equipment.

KPBI and KFDF operated from the same location in the Ward-Garrison Building, located at the corner of 6th Street and Garrison Avenue in Fort Smith. This was also the location for the AM radio stations of KFDF (1580 kHz; now KAGE) and KPBI (1510 kHz; later became KSSP; now defunct). These two AM stations were originally programmed to carry Southern Gospel (featuring the on-air talent of Chuck Buckner, Jason Collier, Nancy Rowland a.k.a. Tonia Trelaine, Mike Vaughn and a few others) and local programming, but around 1994 they were changed to carry sports talk radio (via a satellite feed) and local programming (i.e. The Huddle, which featured Marty Houston Jr., John Wilhelm and later Ernie Witt Jr.). The AM stations were transitioned to fully automated by the Chief Engineer for the TV and AM stations, Stuart Rowland, using a Packard Bell PC, a tone detector and a joystick.

One area that brought notice to KPBI was the use of locally produced computer animations for commercials and promotional spots. This area was pioneered in the local market by Earl Green. His productions won awards both locally and nationally.

KPBI led the area in the technical field of digital spot insertion. KPBI was the first station in the DMA to use computer spot playback in the form of the "Virtual Recorder" from ASC Audio Video. Many of the features currently used in the Virtual Recorder (now sold and supported by Leitch) were originated and/or tested by KPBI.

KPBI and KFDF ended operations as standard television stations when they were sold to Equity Broadcasting, at which time they became automated satellite-fed stations.

KPBI-CA remained the Fox affiliate for the market, under the branding of "Fox Arkansas", until August 28, 2006. On that date, the station lost the Fox affiliation to KFTA-TV, forcing KPBI to be independent, even though Equity Broadcasting challenged the sale of KFTA-TV with the FCC. KPBI-CA then joined Fox's new sister network, MyNetworkTV when it launched on September 5, 2006. There is no known website for KPBI-CA. KFDF, the original MNTV affiliate, joined the Retro Television Network.

KPBI-CA signed off March 28, 2008, after losing its transmitter site. Two of the station's repeaters, KJBW-CA in Springdale and KRBF-CA in Hindsville, also lost their sites, and left the air two days earlier.

After failing to find a buyer at a bankruptcy auction, KPBI-CA's repeaters were sold to Pinnacle Media in August 2009 (after having initially been included in Silver Point Finance's acquisition on June 2 of several Equity stations), with Pinnacle assuming control under a local marketing agreement on August 5. KPBI-CA itself, as well as KJBW and KRBF, were not named in either sale. The licenses for KJBW and KRBF were deleted in 2010; however, the license for KPBI-CA remained active until the FCC canceled the license on October 24, 2011.

== Repeaters ==
KPBI-CA extended its coverage area with six repeater stations.

- KJBW-CA (channel 4) Springdale, AR
- KRBF-CA (channel 12) Hindsville, AR
- KHMF-CA (channel 14) Bentonville, AR
- KKAF-CD (channel 33) Siloam Springs, AR
- KRAH-CD (channel 35) Paris, AR
- KSJF-CA (channel 50) Poteau, OK
