= 2024 in American television =

In American television in 2024, notable events included television show debuts, finales, and cancellations; channel launches, closures, and re-brandings; stations changing or adding their network affiliations; information on controversies, business transactions, and carriage disputes; and deaths of those who made various contributions to the medium.

== Notable events ==
=== January ===
Date	Event	Ref.
4	The NCAA and ESPN announce an eight-year deal, beginning September 1 and running through the 2031–32 academic year, that would see ESPN and its sister networks carry championship events in 21 women's and 19 men's sports across the three NCAA divisions, most notably continued coverage of the Division I women's basketball tournament.	
5	Nigel Lythgoe announces he has resigned from his role on So You Think You Can Dance in the wake of two sexual misconduct lawsuits filed against him. Lythgoe, who has denied the accusations, co-created the Fox reality competition series in 2005, and had served as its executive producer and lead judge.	
7	Rather than stay with the network as a commentator and fill-in anchor, Medhi Hasan concludes the last episode of his self-titled MSNBC weekend show by stating he would depart the network entirely. The Mehdi Hasan Show's cancellation was announced in November 2023 by MSNBC as part of a revamp of its weekend schedule that took effect the weekend of January 13–14.	
7	The 81st Golden Globe Awards aired on CBS and Paramount+, with notable winners including Best Motion Pictures Poor Things (Musical or Comedy) and Oppenheimer (Drama, among its five wins) and TV series Succession (Best Drama Series, among four wins in a night-leading nine nominations), The Bear (Best Musical or Comedy Series, among its three wins), and Beef (Best Limited Series, Anthology, or Film, among its three wins). The ceremony was hosted by Jo Koy, whose opening monologue was poorly received by guests and critics; Koy defended himself by saying he was hired only ten days prior after several other comedians reportedly declined to host. It also marks the ceremony's return to CBS after a 42-year absence (it previously aired on the network from 1981 to 1982); NBC had televised the Globes since 1996, aside from a one-year absence in 2022.	(Note: NBC declined to air the 79th Golden Globe Awards in 2022, amid industry boycotts surrounding the Hollywood Foreign Press Association's inaction to address the lack of diversity among the organization's members.)
9	The Oklahoma City Thunder reach an agreement with Griffin Media to air eight Friday night games from its remaining 2023–24 regular schedule sublicensed from longtime cable partner Bally Sports Oklahoma (per a clause in parent Diamond Sports Group's 2023–24 NBA contract that allows teams to offer a selection of over-the-air telecasts to local stations within their broadcast territory). The regional sports network would produce and employ its on-air staff for the telecasts (beginning with a January 26 away game against the New Orleans Pelicans), which airs on Griffin-owned MyNetworkTV affiliate KSBI/Oklahoma City (which previously aired Thunder games from 2008 to 2011) and local news subchannel KOTV-DT3/Tulsa.	(Note: Bally Sports Oklahoma has served as the Oklahoma City Thunder's regional cable broadcaster since the network launched in 2008 (as the Fox Sports Southwest spinoff Fox Sports Oklahoma), following the team's relocation from Seattle. The ten-game package will also be regionally simulcast on stations owned by Gray Television (KSWO-DT3/Lawton and KSCW/Wichita) and Morgan Murphy Media (KOAM–KFJX-DT1/DT3/Joplin–Pittsburg).)
10	Two events featuring Republican Party hopefuls for president are concurrently telecast from Des Moines, Iowa: CNN hosts the fifth GOP debate of the campaign season featuring Florida Governor Ron DeSantis and former UN Ambassador Nikki Haley, while Fox News counterprograms with a town hall featuring nomination frontrunner Donald Trump, the former president's first live appearance on that network since 2022.	
13	The Miami Dolphins play the Kansas City Chiefs in an NFL Wild Card game. Peacock broadcasts the contest nationally, the first NFL playoff game to be carried exclusively on a streaming service (though NBC's Miami and Kansas City affiliates carry it locally to satisfy the league's local broadcast requirements).	
14	The 29th Critics' Choice Awards were held at the Barker Hangar in Santa Monica, California, with notable winners including films Oppenheimer and Barbie (with eight and six wins, respectively) and television programs The Bear, Beef (with four wins each) and Succession (with three wins). Chelsea Handler hosted the ceremony on The CW, which used the broadcast to unveil a new brand identity that drops the "The" from its redefined logo (though "The CW" remains the network's name) and replaces its long-time green signature color with a red–orange "hot sauce" palette.	
15	The 75th Primetime Emmy Awards aired on Fox from the Peacock Theater in Los Angeles with Anthony Anderson as host. Notable winners include The Bear and Succession (both with six major wins each, including Outstanding Comedy Series and Outstanding Drama Series, respectively), and Beef (with five awards, including Outstanding Limited or Anthology Series). The ceremony was rescheduled from its original date of September 18, 2023 due to the Hollywood labor disputes.	
17	Diamond Sports Group, owner of the Bally Sports regional networks, announces a bankruptcy restructuring agreement (subject to court approval) that would see Amazon become a minority investor in the company (acquiring a 15% share, in exchange for a $115 million investment) and have Prime Video become its primary streaming partner. The Sinclair Broadcast Group subsidiary has been in Chapter 11 bankruptcy since March 2023, and the deal will also see Sinclair make a $495 million cash payment to settle a lawsuit (filed in July 2023) alleging that Sinclair received about $1.5 billion in transactions that were designed to benefit itself while damaging Diamond's finances.	
23	World Wrestling Entertainment and Netflix announce a ten-year, $5 billion deal to carry WWE Raw in the United States and Canada beginning in January 2025, which resulted in the end of the program's run on cable television after 31 years across two networks (USA Network from 1993 to 2000 and from 2005 to 2024, and Spike TV from 2000 to 2005). Under the same deal, Netflix eventually gained global rights to Raw, and international rights to all other WWE programming, as existing contracts expire.	
23	The Dallas Mavericks reach an agreement with Tegna-owned WFAA/Dallas–Fort Worth to air ten games from its remaining 2023–24 regular schedule sublicensed from Bally Sports Southwest (per a clause in Diamond Sports' NBA contract for the season, see January 9 entry), which produces and employ its on-air staff for the telecasts. The package of Bally-produced games (which began with a March 1 away game against the Boston Celtics) joins three national ABC-televised games that were already slated to air on WFAA through April (including a January 24 home game against the Phoenix Suns). The Mavericks last televised their games over-the-air on CBS-owned KTXA from 2000 to 2021, when longtime cable home Bally Sports Southwest became their exclusive regional TV partner.	(Note: Bally Sports Southwest has served as the Dallas Mavericks' regional cable broadcaster since the network launched in 1983 (as Home Sports Entertainment). The ten-game package will also be regionally simulcast on Gray Television-owned stations KXII-DT2/DT3/Sherman, Texas–Ada, Oklahoma and KLCW–KMYL/Lubbock.)
24	Comedy Central announces that Jon Stewart would return to The Daily Show as an executive producer and through the 2024 U.S. election cycle, host on Monday nights (beginning February 12), with members of the show's correspondents roster anchoring the rest of the week. Stewart had served as the show's host from 1999 to 2015.	
28	The Milwaukee Bucks reach an agreement with Weigel Broadcasting to air a package of ten games from its remaining 2023–24 regular schedule on independent WMLW, along with regional simulcasts on stations throughout Wisconsin and in the Quad Cities, to be produced by Bally Sports Wisconsin under a sublicensing agreement. Two of the scheduled games were simulcast on WMLW's Milwaukee-area sister stations: a February 23 away game against the Minnesota Timberwolves (the first of the slate) that also airs on co-owned CBS affiliate WDJT, and a March 4 home game against the Los Angeles Clippers that will be presented in Spanish on Telemundo affiliate WYTU. They are the first local over-the-air Bucks telecasts since the team's 19-year relationship with WCGV ended in 2007.	(Note: Bally Sports Wisconsin has served as the Milwaukee Bucks' regional cable broadcaster since the network launched in 2007 as Fox Sports Wisconsin, a spinoff of Fox Sports North (which itself had held the team's cable rights since that network, then known as Midwest Sports Channel, merged with the Wisconsin Sports Network in 1996. The ten-game package will also be regionally simulcast on stations owned by Morgan Murphy Media (WISC-DT1/DT3/Madison), Gray Television (WBAY-DT1/DT3)/Green Bay, WEAU–WECX/Eau Claire–La Crosse, and WSAW–WYOW/Wausau), and Tegna (WQAD-DT3/Davenport, Iowa).)

=== February ===
Date	Event	Ref.
1	Gray Television announces it reached an agreement to trade CBS/CW+ affiliate KGWN/Cheyenne, NBC/CW+ affiliate KCWY/Casper, Wyoming, and NBC affiliate KNEP/Scottsbluff, Nebraska (which concurrently shut down its news bureau, replaced in-house newscasts with simulcasts from KGWN/KCWY's Cheyenne-based Wyoming News Now operation, and laid off most of its Scottsbluff-based staff) to Marquee Broadcasting, in exchange for the latter group's construction permit for the proposed KCBU/Salt Lake City. Neither company will receive additional cash or other compensation as part of the transaction.	(Note: The KCBU call letters were previously assigned to a television station licensed to Price, Utah, which operated from October 2003 to June 2009. Equity Media Holdings sold the station at auction to religious broadcaster Daystar in April 2009, three months before the station ceased analog operations. (KCBU's digital transmission facilities were never built.) Daystar cancelled the station's FCC license in July 2010, refocusing on returning sister KUTF/Logan to the air instead.)
2	Twelve Cox Media Group-owned stations in nine markets are removed from DirecTV and co-owned DirecTV Stream and U-verse in a contract renewal impasse, resulting in the complete loss of satellite distribution for the group's stations. (Cox has been in a dispute with Dish Network since November 2022, resulting in the removal of those 12 stations, out of 13 operated by the group.) The Cox-owned stations were restored on February 11, in turn, averting subscriber blackouts of CBS's Super Bowl LVIII coverage in the Seattle and Dayton markets.	(Note: In the Jacksonville DMA, CBS affiliate WJAX—which Cox operates under a joint sales agreement with owner Hoffman Communications—was not involved in either the DirecTV or Dish Network disputes as it is covered by a separate carriage contracts from that of Fox-affiliated virtual duopoly partner WFOX.)
4	The 66th Annual Grammy Awards aired on CBS and streamed on Paramount+ from the Crypto.com Arena, with Trevor Noah as host. Notable winners include Phoebe Bridgers (who received the most wins with four awards, including Best Pop Duo/Group Performance for "Ghost in the Machine" alongside SZA), Taylor Swift (whose Album of the Year win for Midnights made her the first artist to win in that category four times), Miley Cyrus (who won Record of the Year for "Flowers"), siblings Billie Eilish and Finneas (jointly winning Song of the Year for "What Was I Made For?" from the Barbie film soundtrack), and Victoria Monét (the Best New Artist winner).	
6	Actress Gina Carano sues The Walt Disney Company and co-owned Lucasfilm on claims she was wrongfully fired from The Mandalorian, seeking an order forcing the studio to rehire her or pay at least $75,000 in damages. Carano, who played Cara Dune during the Disney+ space Western's first two seasons, was fired in February 2021 after comparing the treatment of conservatives to the Nazi persecution of Jews in an Instagram post (one of several inflammatory social media posts of hers that were heavily criticized for their far-right viewpoints including remarks mocking COVID-19 masking mandates and the inclusion of gender pronouns in social media profiles, and falsely claiming voter fraud in the 2020 election). Carano, who received assistance from X/Twitter parent X Corp. to cover legal fees, claims Lucasfilm did not hold male co-stars to similar standards for controversial posts aimed at Republicans (including one by series lead Pedro Pascal from 2017, comparing then-President Donald Trump to Hitler), and subjected her to harassment and hurt her future work prospects.	(Note: X Corp. owner/CEO Elon Musk stated in an August 2023 X post that the company would provide unlimited legal fee services for users considering discrimination lawsuits relating to their activity on the platform.)
6	Five years after rejoining PBS, KCET/Los Angeles rebrands as "PBS SoCal Plus" to further connect it with sister station KOCE/Huntington Beach, which replaced KCET as the market's primary PBS member (and first adopted the "PBS SoCal" brand) in January 2011. The callsign and the programming remains the same.	
6	ESPN Inc., Fox Corporation and Warner Bros. Discovery announce plans to launch a sports-focused streaming service, later branded as Venu Sports in May, that would feature live feeds from their respective linear sports and broadcast networks (including ESPN, ABC and the former's sister networks such as ESPN2 and SEC Network; Fox and sister networks FS1, FS2 and Big Ten Network; and WBD-owned TNT, TBS and truTV), and streaming content from ESPN+, the major sports leagues (including the NBA, NHL, NFL and Major League Baseball) and college sports conferences. The service, which would also be optionally bundled with Disney+, Hulu, or Max, would reportedly not impact ESPN's own plans to launch a full direct-to-consumer streaming service, which the company confirmed the following day would launch in the Fall of 2025. In response, FuboTV filed an antitrust lawsuit on February 20, claiming Venu would give the three broadcasters an unfair advantage over providers such as Fubo who are forced to carry less-desirable programming for access to sports. On August 16, a federal judge issued a preliminary injunction to block Venu's launch. On September 12, the lawsuit's trial date was set for October 2025.	
7	Actress Arianne Zucker sues former Days of Our Lives co-executive producer/director Albert Alarr, executive producer Ken Corday and production company Corday Productions, alleging she was discriminated and wrongfully fired after filing a complaint accusing Alarr of making unwanted sexual advances and touching her nonconsensually while working on the Peacock soap opera. Zucker, who played Nicole Walker over three stints since she was cast on the then-NBC serial in 1998, claims that, as retaliation for her involvement in Days distributor Sony Pictures Television's investigation into Alarr's conduct (which led to his August 2023 dismissal), she was written out of storylines and given a "take it or leave it" offer to renew her contract (which lapsed in January without renewal, with Zucker contending Corday Productions refused to negotiate in good faith) despite her veteran cast member status, along with having had her salary and travel budget cut.	
7	The Federal Communications Commission issues a $720,000 fine against Nexstar Media Group in relation to a complaint filed in July 2023 by Hawaiian Telcom that the group violated FCC good faith carriage negotiation rules in their two-month dispute (which began the month prior) that blacked out Nexstar's KHON (Fox/CW)–KHII (MyNetworkTV)/Honolulu and NewsNation from the provider's systems. Hawaiian Telcom accused Nexstar of withholding consent by not responding to its request to extend negotiations by one week until immediately before the agreement expired, that Nexstar demanded an 80% increase in carriage fees, and that the group demanded Hawaiian Telcom rescind its FCC complaint and not file any against the company in the future.	(Note: The dispute also affected four stations licensed to Hilo and Wailuku that operate as satellites of KHON and KHII: KHON repeaters KHAW and KAII, and KHII repeaters KGMD and KGMV, respectively.)
11	The NFL's Super Bowl LVIII, won by the Kansas City Chiefs (25–22, in overtime) over the San Francisco 49ers, airs on CBS from Allegiant Stadium in Paradise, Nevada. Univision airs Spanish-language coverage of the game (that network's first ever Super Bowl), while CBS sibling network Nickelodeon also airs a child-oriented broadcast (the first alternate English-language telecast of a Super Bowl). The game becomes the most-watched television program in history, with an estimated 123.4 million viewers.	
12	The Cleveland Cavaliers reach an agreement with Gray Television to air a package of five games from its remaining 2023–24 regular schedule locally on CW affiliate WUAB and in Cincinnati on Fox affiliate WXIX, along with regional simulcasts on stations throughout the rest of Ohio and West Virginia's northern panhandle. The package, which will be produced by Bally Sports Ohio under a sublicensing agreement, will begin with a March 5 away game against the Boston Celtics and marks the first time Cavs games have been televised over-the-air since their previous 24-year relationship with WUAB ended in 2018, in favor of an exclusive agreement with longtime cable home Fox Sports Ohio (renamed in 2021 under the Bally Sports banner).	(Note: WUAB previously aired live Cavaliers games off-and-on from 1972 to 2018, with interruptions in coverage from 1975–79 (the team did not provide local telecasts for 1975–76, before assigning local broadcast rights to WJW for the following three seasons) and 1989–94 (the team's over-the-air telecasts aired during that period on present-day sister station WOIO, before returning to WUAB as a result of the former's September 1994 switch from Fox to CBS). Bally Sports Ohio has served as the Cleveland Cavaliers' regional cable broadcaster since 1990, when the network was known as SportsChannel Ohio. The five-game package will also be regionally simulcast on stations owned and/or operated by Tegna (WBNS-DT1/DT2/Columbus), Cox Media Group (WHIO-DT2/Dayton), and Nexstar Media Group (WBDT/Dayton, WTRF-DT2/Wheeling–Steubenville and WYTV-DT2/Youngstown). (In the Dayton market, three games will air on WBDT while the remainder will air on WHIO-DT2.))
12	During an appearance on Jimmy Kimmel Live!, Katy Perry announces that she would be leaving American Idol following its upcoming 22nd season (which premiered on February 18). Perry has been on the ABC talent competition's judge panel since its revival in 2018.	
13	NBC Sports California announces the hiring of Jenny Cavnar as primary play-by-play announcer for its Oakland Athletics telecasts, beginning with the upcoming 2024 Major League Baseball season. Cavnar, who spent the past 12 years as a pre- and post-game host and backup announcer for Colorado Rockies games, becomes the first woman in MLB history to call games on a regular basis.	
15	During a viewer submission segment on its 7:00 p.m. newscast, KGW/Portland, Oregon airs a photo—captioned "Boy scouts in the 50s" by the submitter—showing a racist slur (“hit the nigger baby”) on a banner for a fairground ball-throwing attraction. The Tegna-owned NBC affiliate issues an apology during its newscasts the next day, acknowledging their "failure to uphold," and promising their reevaluation of, station standards regarding viewer-submitted content.	(Note: The submitter did not capitalize "scouts" in the photo caption.)
17	Former U.S. Representative George Santos sues Jimmy Kimmel for $750,000 on charges of copyright infringement, fraud, breach of contract, and unjust enrichment after Kimmel purchased custom Cameo videos from Santos using fake names and aired them on his ABC late night show.	
18	The 49th People's Choice Awards air on NBC, E! and Peacock from the Barker Hangar in Santa Monica, California, with Simu Liu as host. Among television nominees, The Kardashians (Reality Show of the Year, and Khloé Kardashian for Reality TV Star of the Year), The Last of Us (Drama Show of the Year, and Pedro Pascal for Male TV Star of the Year) and Only Murders in the Building (Comedy Show of the Year, and Selena Gomez for Female TV Star of the Year) tied for the most wins, with two awards each, while Grey's Anatomy won the Show of the Year. Barbie had the most wins among all categories with five awards (including Movie of the Year, and respective wins by Ryan Gosling and Margot Robbie for Male and Female Movie Star of the Year). Taylor Swift led the music categories with four awards (including Female Artist of the Year). Adam Sandler and Lenny Kravitz, respectively, were honored with the People's Icon Award and Music Icon Award.	
22	Sam Waterston makes his final appearance on Law & Order as Jack McCoy, as the character resigns as New York City District Attorney rather than face the political wrath of the mayor (for subpoenaing the mayor's son in a murder case) in the episode "Last Dance." Waterston, who announced his departure from the series on February 2 (after appearing in over 400 episodes in 19 seasons across 30 years), would be succeeded by Tony Goldwyn as new DA Nicholas Baxter later in the current 23rd season.	
28	Tom Skilling retires from WGN-TV/Chicago, after nearly 46 years as meteorologist for the Nexstar-owned independent station. His final evening newscasts that day capped off a month-long tribute to Skilling, who received reverence in the Chicago broadcasting and national meteorological communities during his tenure (the latter resulting from his weathercasts being televised over WGN's former superstation feed (now NewsNation) from 1978 to 2014) for the in-depth analysis and striking accuracy of his forecasts. Demetrius Ivory, who joined the station in 2013, succeeded Skilling as chief meteorologist on February 29.	
28	Nexstar Media Group petitions the Fifth Circuit Court of Appeals to review changes to FCC broadcast ownership rules passed in December 2023 that closed loopholes allowing licensees to hold more than one Big Four affiliation in a market by placing certain networks on subchannels or low-power stations, and upheld a 1996 rule prohibiting broadcasters from owning stations that reach more than 39% of U.S. households in total. Nexstar asserts that the FCC overstepped its authority by tightening ownership rules despite competition to broadcast media by pay television and streaming, and claims the order had numerous procedural problems and faulty conclusions in violation of the Administrative Procedure Act and the 1996 Telecommunications Act.	(Note: The FCC typically reviews its media ownership regulations every four years; however, administrative delays to its 2018 quadrennial review effort prompted a September 2023 lawsuit by the National Association of Broadcasters to force the agency—which was given a 90-day notice to issue its changes—to finalize the review. Nexstar Media Group has long employed outsourcing agreements with various third-party licensees to control stations it cannot own directly under FCC rules; in addition to owning 197 stations outright as of 2024, Nexstar controls 40 additional stations owned by third parties (such as Mission Broadcasting, Vaughan Media and White Knight Broadcasting) under such agreements.)

=== March ===
Date	Event	Ref.
7	President Joe Biden delivers his third State of the Union address, airing along with associated coverage on all major broadcast and cable news networks. In the speech, Biden addressed issues such as the economy, democracy, abortion rights (directly addressing Supreme Court justices in an unscripted moment regarding the 2022 court decision that overturned Roe v. Wade), immigration (reiterating calls for House Republicans to pass bipartisan immigration legislation stalled under pressure from Republican presidential candidate Donald Trump and mentioning the February murder of Laken Riley in the context of border policy), the Russian invasion of Ukraine, and the Gaza war (advocating for a temporary ceasefire and two-state solution to the conflict, and demanding Israeli Prime Minister Benjamin Netanyahu allow in humanitarian aid to Gaza civilians). The Republican response delivered by Alabama U.S. Senator Katie Britt, which primarily touched on immigration, drew largely negative reviews (including from Republicans), and was criticized for its inaccuracy (including a misrepresentation of the story of Karla Jacinto Romero, who was sold into sex trafficking while in Mexico during George W. Bush's presidency) and for Britt's stylistic delivery (described as "dramatic", "creepy", "insincere" and "over-the-top", and questioning her decision to conduct the response in her kitchen). The address drew 32.2 million viewers across nine networks, with Fox News registering the highest viewership at 5.640 million.	
10	The 96th Academy Awards air on ABC from the Dolby Theatre, with Jimmy Kimmel as host. Oppenheimer led all nominees in overall wins with seven awards, including Best Picture, Best Actor (Cillian Murphy), Best Supporting Actor (Robert Downey Jr.) and Best Director (Christopher Nolan). Other major winners included Poor Things with four awards, including Best Actress (Emma Stone); and The Zone of Interest with two, including Best International Feature Film. Billie Eilish and Finneas won Best Original Song (for "What Was I Made For?" from the Barbie film soundtrack), becoming the youngest two-time Oscar winners in history (at ages 22 and 26, respectively), having previously won the award in 2022. The telecast was watched by 19.5 million viewers, the highest viewership for any awards show since 2020.	
11	TNT Sports launches a nightly sports block on TruTV that features a mix of live sports events (including "alterna-casts", specialized simulcasts targeting various audiences, of NHL, MLB and NBA games shown on TBS and TNT, NCAA men's basketball tournament coverage and MotoGP races); sports news and ancillary original programs (including the half-hour TNT Sports Update, sports betting program The Line, social media conversation show Handles, and a weekly program based on the social media clip showcase House of Highlights); and sports-focused movies and documentaries. Reruns of its original unscripted programs (including its last remaining non-sports original program, Impractical Jokers, which consequently moves its first-run episodes to TBS in the summer) continues to air in the morning and daytime hours following the addition of the "TNT Sports on TruTV" block.	
14	In a 3–2 party-line vote (backed solely by its Democratic commissioners), the Federal Communications Commission, as part of a broader effort by the Biden administration to curb hidden "junk" fees charged to customers, passes new rules requiring cable and satellite providers to disclose the total cost of their programming packages (including any additional programming-related fees, such as surcharges for receiving local stations and regional sports networks) in billing and promotional materials. The NCTA asserts that the rules, as written, would create confusion for customers and that providers already offer "clear and accurate pricing information" about their programming tiers.	
16	The 55th NAACP Image Awards airs from the Shrine Auditorium and Expo Hall.	
17	Three days after the FCC voted to require television providers to disclose "all-in" pricing (incorporating surcharges for receiving certain channels) and likely in response to recent carriage disputes with station operators, DirecTV introduces a "No Locals" option for its Entertainment, Choice, Ultimate and Premier programming tiers, allowing its satellite customers the ability to opt out of receiving local broadcast stations available in their home markets for a $12 monthly discount. (It joins rival satellite provider Dish Network, which has offered such opt-outs since 2017, in allowing customers to exclude local stations from their channel packages.)	(Note: Customers could still receive local stations for free using an optional antenna.)
18	Then-former U.S. president and 2024 presumptive Republican presidential nominee Donald Trump sues ABC News and George Stephanopoulos for defamation, claiming the This Week moderator harmed his reputation by stating multiple times in a March 10 interview with Representative Nancy Mace (R-S.C.) that Trump had been found civilly liable for raping former Vogue advice columnist E. Jean Carroll. The lawsuit, filed in the U.S. District Court for the Southern District of Florida, stems from Stephanopoulos' questioning of Mace, a rape survivor, about her continued support of Trump despite two recent jury verdicts in related civil battery and defamation suits that found he sexually abused Carroll, who has been awarded $88.3 million in damages, in 1995/96. (Mace accused Stephanopoulos of trying to “shame” her by probing why she endorsed Trump for president.) While the jury in the initial 2023 civil defamation case technically found Trump liable for sexually assaulting and defaming Carroll, Judge Lewis Kaplan later clarified that they found that Trump raped her by forcible digital penetration (defined as sexual assault under New York's penal code), concluding her allegation of rape was “substantially true" in the broader context beyond the state's legal definition. ABC later settled the lawsuit for $15 million on December 14 of the same year.	
19	Bellator MMA announces a distribution deal with Warner Bros. Discovery that would see Max acquire streaming rights to the promotion's mixed martial arts events (including its eight 2024 Champions Series fights, starting with Bellator 302 on March 22), archival fight cards (dating to Bellator's 2008 inception) and original docuseries, along with additional fights and ancillary content on TruTV. The WBD deal replaces a previous agreement with former owner Paramount Global, which acquired the promotion in 2011 (as Viacom) and sold it to the Professional Fighters League in 2023. (Outside of a 2019–20 deal with DAZN, Bellator matches aired on multiple Paramount/Viacom-owned networks during that timeframe, last airing on Showtime from 2021 to 2023, with that deal ending as a result of Paramount shuttering the premium channel's sports division.)	(Note: The Bellator agreement is separate from the Professional Fighters League's existing media rights deal with ESPN Inc., which includes MMA events broadcast on ESPN's linear networks and the ESPN+ streaming service.)
20	The College Football Playoff announces a six-year deal with ESPN (worth an estimated $7.8 billion overall) that would see the network retain broadcast rights to the College Football Playoff through the 2020–31 academic year, and would transfer the CFP National Championship game from ESPN to sister network ABC (which carried the predecessor BCS National Championship Game from 1999 to 2006) starting in 2026. The agreement also modifies terms of the remaining two years of ESPN's initial contract for the CFP television rights (a 12-year deal that was signed in 2014) to account for the tournament's expansion from four to 12 teams, starting with the 2024–25 college football season, and allows for ESPN to sublicense a select number of CFP games to other networks.	
21	The FCC fines Nexstar Media Group and partner company Mission Broadcasting a combined $1.82 million, and orders the latter to sell WPIX/New York City, ruling that Nexstar unlawfully circumvented national broadcast ownership limits through a local marketing agreement it signed in December 2020, as part of an option that Mission exercised to buy the CW affiliate from the E. W. Scripps Company, that resulted in "an unauthorized transfer of control" of WPIX to Nexstar through certain attributable interests. (The FCC limits a single company from owning television stations that reach a combined 39% of American TV households, thus requiring Nexstar, which maintains similar operational arrangements with Mission in 26 other markets, to sell other stations in its portfolio in order to acquire WPIX while complying with the cap). Its first sale proposal to meet the cap would be disclosed on April 12, as it proposed to sell MyNetworkTV affiliate WJMN/Escanaba, Michigan (a former semi-satellite of co-owned WFRV/Green Bay that disaffected with CBS in 2022 in a chain-wide affiliation renewal dispute with the network) to a former Quincy Media executive who would enter into an LMA with Morgan Murphy Media, the new owners of ABC/CW affiliate WBUP/WBKP in the same market.	(Note: The FCC respectively levied fines of $1.2 million against Nexstar Media Group and $620,000 against Mission Broadcasting for the violations.)
22	NBC News announces that Ronna McDaniel would join the network as a contributor for its political and Election Night coverage. The hiring of McDaniel (who, on March 8, ended her seven-year term as Republican National Committee chair, a role in which she frequently echoed Donald Trump's false claims that the 2020 presidential election was rigged in Joe Biden's favor and helped organize fake electors in key battleground states in an attempt to overturn the outcome)was met with furor within the news division including on-air denouncements from former Meet the Press moderator Chuck Todd and various MSNBC hosts and analysts. MSNBC president Rashida Jones, responding to staff backlash, announced on March 23 that McDaniel would not appear on its programs. McDaniel, for her part, used a March 24 appearance on NBC's Meet the Press with Kristen Welker (which was scheduled and recorded before her hiring by the network) to state that Biden won fairly and disagrees with Trump's desire to pardon the January 6 rioters. NBC parted ways with McDaniel on March 26, citing a lack of consensus in support of her hiring.	
25	CBS announces a linear–streaming rights deal with Dick Clark Productions that extends its contract for the Golden Globe Awards (initially a one-year deal for the 2024 edition) through 2030, and grants it telecast rights to the American Music Awards for an unspecified term. (Both award shows are also streamed live on Paramount+.) The deal ends the AMAs' 51-year broadcast relationship with ABC, for which Clark created the ceremony in 1973 following the expiration of the network's deal to televise the Grammy Awards, which moved to longtime broadcaster CBS that same year. (The AMAs were last awarded in 2022.)	
28	The Detroit Pistons reach an agreement with the E. W. Scripps Company to air a package of five games (out of the team's eight remaining regular season games scheduled for April) from its 2023–24 schedule locally on CW affiliate WMYD. The package, which would be produced by longtime cable carrier Bally Sports Detroit (which simulcast the games outside of the Detroit market) under a sublicensing agreement with Scripps Sports, begins with an April 1 home game against the Memphis Grizzlies. It marks the first time that Pistons games have been televised over-the-air since their previous four-year relationship with WMYD and Graham-owned NBC affiliate WDIV ended in 2008, in favor of an exclusive deal with the network then known as Fox Sports Detroit.	(Note: Bally Sports Detroit has served as the Pistons' regional cable broadcaster since the network's founding in 1997, when the network was known as Fox Sports Detroit, which assumed the local cable rights from the defunct PASS Sports. The simulcast arrangement with Bally Sports Detroit differs from other recent NBA sublicensing deals forged by parent Diamond Sports Group during the 2023–24 NBA season that saw over-the-air games simulcast on several stations within the team's territory to supplement arrangements with stations in each team's home market; incidentally, in addition to WMYD and ABC-affiliated sister WXYZ in the Detroit market, Scripps also owns stations in two nearby markets, WXMI/Grand Rapids, Michigan (Fox) and WSYM/Lansing (Fox/MyNetworkTV).)
29	NFL Network's Good Morning Football broadcasts its final show from New York City before going on hiatus and relocating to the NFL Media facility in Inglewood, California before the 2024 NFL season. Plans are also in the works to offer a two-hour extension of the program in broadcast syndication via Sony Pictures Television upon its move.	
30	The United Football League airs its inaugural game on Fox, a 27–14 win by the Birmingham Stallions over the host Arlington Renegades. The teams were champions of the leagues that merged to form the UFL on December 31, 2023, the USFL (of which the Stallions were two-time champs) and the XFL (the Renegades won that league's 2023 title).	

=== April ===
Date	Event	Ref.
1	The 2024 iHeartRadio Music Awards airs from the Dolby Theatre.	
1–7	The final week of the 2024 NCAA Division I women's basketball tournament sees three viewership records for women's basketball being set: On April 1, ESPN's broadcast of a regional final between Iowa Hawkeyes over the LSU Tigers (a 94–87 win by the Hawkeyes propelled by a 41-point performance from Hawkeye star Caitlin Clark) attracts 12.3 million viewers, surpassing the 9.9 million who watched those two schools play in the 2023 national championship. On April 5, a 71–69 national semifinal win by the Hawkeyes over UConn attracts 14.2 million to ESPN, a record for any basketball game (college or pro, men or women) on the network. Then on April 7, the tournament's title game, an 87–75 win by undefeated South Carolina over the Hawkeyes, attracts 18.9 million total viewers on ABC and ESPN, (the latter channel carried a Sue Bird/Diana Taurasi-hosted alternate telecast) it was the most-watched sporting event, outside of football and the Olympics, since 2019.	
6–7	WWE's WrestleMania XL takes place at Lincoln Financial Field in Philadelphia, Pennsylvania, airing on Peacock and pay-per-view.	
7	The 2024 CMT Music Awards, hosted by Kelsea Ballerini, aired on CBS and streamed on Paramount+ from the Moody Center in Austin, Texas. Notable winners include Jelly Roll (who received the most wins with three awards, Video of the Year, Male Video of the Year and Performance of the Year, for "Need a Favor"), Lainey Wilson (who won Female Video of the Year for "Watermelon Moonshine") and Dan + Shay (who won Duo/Group Video of the Year for "Save Me the Trouble"). Trisha Yearwood received the inaugural June Carter Cash Humanitarian Award, recognizing artists, duos/groups or industry veterans who "demonstrate an exceptional dedication to the community and their fellow artists."	
8	TBS and TNT's simulcast of the NCAA Division I men's basketball championship game, a 75–60 win by the UConn Huskies over the Purdue Boilermakers, attracts 14.82 million viewers. When compared to the women's DI title game (see 4/1–4/7 entry), it is the first time the women's championship game draws a bigger TV audience than the men's.	
10	A fire during a cooking segment on the set of Tamron Hall (which utilizes a temporary kitchen island with cooktop that is set up center stage for those segments) forces an evacuation of the show's studio at ABC's Broadcast Center in New York's Lincoln Square, with The View, which records in an adjacent studio, also seeing its studio evacuated as a precautionary measure. Although the New York Fire Department cleared The View to go live after the fire was put out, Tamron canceled the day's episode and substituted a rerun to its carrier stations.	
14	As Billy Joel is performing his signature song "Piano Man" during a CBS broadcast of the 100th concert in his Madison Square Garden residency, affiliates in the Eastern and Central time zones interrupt the live telecast and begin airing local news. Responding to outrage from viewers, CBS blamed the abrupt ending on a "timing error" (the special had been delayed 30 minutes due to final round coverage of the Masters Tournament) and announced it would re-air the program in its entirety on April 19.	
19	One day after the NHL Board of Governors announced the establishment of a Utah-based franchise in Salt Lake City (through the acquisition of assets from the deactivated Arizona Coyotes assigned to Utah Jazz owner Ryan Smith), the team reaches a multi-year agreement with Scripps Sports to air their regionally televised hockey games on independent KUPX/Provo once the team begins play in the 2024–25 season. The Coyotes had been airing on KUPX under a regional simulcast arrangement with Phoenix sister KASW, which continues to air the team's games post-relocation in a flip of the arrangement, since that station replaced the defunct Bally Sports Arizona as the team's local television carrier at the start of the 2023–24 season.	
22	One week after the moribund franchise selected former Iowa point guard Caitlin Clark as the first pick in the first round of the 2024 WNBA draft, the Indiana Fever reach an agreement with Tegna to air a package of 17 regionally televised WNBA games on NBC affiliate WTHR and MeTV affiliate WALV-CD, beginning with the team's 2024 season. The deal begins with the team's home opener against the New York Liberty on May 16, and would see ten of the games being carried on WTHR, while seven others air on WALV (which is simulcast on WTHR's DT3 subchannel).	(Note: The package of Fever games will also be regionally simulcast on stations owned and/or operated by Tegna (WQAD-DT1 and DT3/Davenport, Iowa, WOI–KCWI/Des Moines and WHAS-DT1 and DT2/Louisville), Nexstar Media Group (WCIA–WCIX/Champaign, Illinois–Springfield, Illinois), Gray Television (WXIX-DT3/Cincinnati, WFIE-DT2/Evansville, WPTA-DT3/Fort Wayne, WKYT-DT2/Lexington, Kentucky and WNDU-DT2/South Bend), Sinclair Broadcast Group (WKEF-DT3/Dayton, Ohio), Weigel Broadcasting (WCWW–WMYS/South Bend), and Coastal Television Broadcasting Group (WPBY-LD1/LD2/Lafayette, Indiana).)
25	The Seattle Kraken reach a multi-year agreement with Tegna to air their regionally televised games on independent station KONG, along with simulcasts of selected games on sister NBC affiliate KING, beginning with the NHL team's 2024–25 season. The deal, which replaces the team's previous television partnership with regional sports network Root Sports Northwest, which has carried the Kraken since the expansion franchise began play in 2021, would also see fellow Tegna stations KGW/Portland and KREM/Spokane simulcast the games across the team's regional territory, and KING/KONG carry team-related programs. Additionally, all Kraken games would be streamed on Amazon Prime Video in the Krakens' home market.	
25	The CW announces a three-year deal with the Miss Universe Organization that extends its contract for the Miss USA pageant (initially a one-year deal for the 2023 edition), and grants it linear telecast rights to Miss Teen USA, starting with the 2024 ceremony. (Miss Teen USA, which has its 42nd edition air on The CW on August 1, three days before the network's telecast of the 73rd Miss USA Pageant, had last aired on linear television in 2007, when the Miss Universe Organization ended a broadcast deal with NBC for the pageant separate from its contracts for Miss USA and Miss Universe, and was livestreamed on various platforms thereafter.)	
29	WBKB-TV, the only commercial broadcast station in Alpena, Michigan (the nation's third-smallest TV market) and carrier of four of the five major commercial television networks, begins a news partnership with Sinclair's NBC affiliate, WPBN-TV/WTOM-TV in Traverse City, Michigan, to feature a full complement of newscasts and weather coverage blended with WBKB-TV's existing news operation, which becomes a de facto bureau for WPBN/WTOM, known on-air as UpNorthLive News. WBKB, which had been acquired by Morgan Murphy Media in late 2023 after the death of its former owner in May 2022, had struggled to maintain a full-time news and weather staff because of its market position and ownership in an era of media consolidation, mainly featuring a team staffed by recent college graduates, and also had issues maintaining full-time weather coverage, contracting short-term with freelance meteorologists and NewsNet to provide forecasts. WBKB still produces some newscasts, with its NBC subchannel carrying all UpNorthLive newscasts, and its CBS and ABC channels carrying other simulcasts depending on their own schedules. WBKB's Fox schedule continues to feature no news programming.	

=== May ===
Date	Event	Ref.
1	Comcast removes 18 Bally Sports regional networks from Xfinity systems throughout their overlapping footprints, in a carriage dispute between the cable provider and Bally parent Diamond Sports Group, immediately affecting fans of 11 of the 12 Major League Baseball teams to which Bally Sports holds broadcast rights. The dispute injects uncertainty in Diamond's efforts to emerge from Chapter 11 bankruptcy before the end of the year, as it had hoped to secure a deal with Comcast ahead of a June confirmation hearing with the U.S. Bankruptcy Court for the Southern District of Texas. Xfinity and Diamond Sports eventually came to an agreement on July 29, ending the dispute.	
2	Allen Media Group announces the layoffs of up to around 300 employees across its various operating divisions (including The Weather Channel, TheGrio and the company's television stations), affecting 12% of its workforce, as part of a broader effort to reduce operational costs to drive growth. Among those affected was veteran Weather Channel correspondent Mike Seidel, who joined the network as an on-camera meteorologist in 1992 and transitioned exclusively to field reporting in 2012.	
5	In a memo to ABC News staffers, Kim Godwin announces she would be leaving her role as president of ABC's news division, a job she had held since 2021. Debra O'Connell, the president of News Group and Networks at ABC parent Disney Entertainment (and to whom Godwin had been reporting to since February), is appointed to lead ABC News on an interim basis until a successor for Godwin is hired.	
13	Major League Baseball and Roku, Inc. announce an agreement to air the MLB Sunday Leadoff package of early Sunday afternoon games on The Roku Channel. The package had aired the previous two seasons on Peacock.	
14	The Pac-12 Conference announces an agreement with CW Sports and Fox Sports to air college football games involving the conference's two remaining schools, Oregon State and Washington State. Fox or FS1 would air one game for each school, while The CW would carry the rest.	
15	Netflix announces it has secured broadcast rights to National Football League Christmas Day games in a three-year deal that would see the streamer carry two games in 2024 and at least one game in both 2025 and 2026.	
16	The 59th Academy of Country Music Awards streams live on Amazon Prime Video from Ford Center at The Star with Reba McEntire as host.	
22	Mission Broadcasting notifies Adell Broadcasting, owner of WADL/Mount Clemens, Michigan, that it would terminate its plan to purchase Detroit's MyNetworkTV affiliate. First announced in May 2023, the deal would have seen WADL operated by longtime Mission partner Nexstar Media Group and affiliate with Nexstar-owned The CW (which the station previously carried from September to October 2023, before Adell terminated the brokered affiliation agreement in an LMA dispute with Mission/Nexstar). Though the FCC approved Mission's purchase on April 24, Mission withdrew the plan citing FCC-imposed restrictions that would have prevented financial backing from Nexstar from going towards Mission's purchase of WADL, limiting the amount of Nexstar-distributed programming it carried each week (likely constraining the station from carrying the full CW schedule), and prohibiting any option for Nexstar to acquire the station from Mission outright.	
22	TNT Sports announces a five-year sublicensing agreement with ESPN that would see TNT, beginning in December, carry two first-round games in the expanded College Football Playoff (of which ESPN has the rights), with two quarterfinal games being added beginning in 2026.	

=== June ===
Date	Event	Ref.
1	NewsNation formally adopts a 24/7 news format by expanding its weekend news coverage, replacing a three-hour block of Blue Bloods reruns with an extension of the daytime news program NewsNation Now. The Nexstar-owned cable channel that was formerly known as WGN America began weeknight news programming in September 2020 and expanded to a 24-hour all-news schedule on weekdays in April 2023, but while early-morning and prime-time news/analysis shows populated its weekend lineup, its weekend afternoon schedule had still featured entertainment programming acquired during the WGN era (notably off-network reruns like Blue Bloods).	
3	In discussing the WNBA on his eponymous ESPN program, former National Football League punter Pat McAfee refers to Indiana Fever rookie Caitlin Clark as a "white bitch" who is ultimately responsible for the increased popularity in the league. After receiving criticism from sports commentators including ESPN colleagues like Kim Adams and Alexa Philippou, McAfee issued apologies to Clark personally as well as the public, stating "I have way too much respect for her and women to put that into the universe."	
6	Fifty-eight years to the day after he began his professional broadcasting career at the station, Don Alhart retires from WHAM-TV/Rochester, NY, signing off after having served as a reporter, main news anchor, and associate news director for the Deerfield Media-owned/Sinclair-operated ABC affiliate.	
7	The 51st Daytime Emmy Awards airs on CBS and streamed on Paramount+ from the Westin Bonaventure Hotel.	
7	Pat Sajak retires as host of Wheel of Fortune as his final episode airs. Sajak had hosted the show since 1981, and is the longest tenured game show host in U.S. history.	
11	Confirming earlier reports, TNT Sports announces it has secured U.S. broadcast rights to the French Open tennis tournament for a 10-year period beginning in 2025, with matches being carried across TNT, TBS, TruTV, and the Max streaming service. The deal means NBC's relationship with the French Open ended with its broadcast of the men's singles championship on June 9; the network had broadcast the tournament each year since 1975 (save for a three-year period in the early 1980s when it aired on CBS).	
13	Fox Sports announces it has reached a deal with IndyCar to become the open-wheel racing circuit's exclusive TV partner beginning in 2025, supplanting NBC Sports in the role. The deal sees the full IndyCar Series schedule (including its crown jewel, the Indianapolis 500) airing on Fox, with qualifying rounds (save for the Indy 500's, which Fox would also carry) and the second-tier Indy NXT races airing on FS1 or FS2.	
16	The 77th Tony Awards airs on CBS and streams on Paramount+ from the David H. Koch Theater with Ariana DeBose as host, with its technical awards airing before the show on a Pluto TV pop-up channel.	
27	The National Football League is ordered to pay more than $4.7 billion in damages after a federal jury in Los Angeles found the league had violated antitrust law in setting the price on its NFL Sunday Ticket package for games not selected for broadcast in a television market. The lawsuit covers more than 2.4 million customers who subscribed to the service from 2011 to 2022 on DirecTV, which at the time had been the exclusive provider of NFL Sunday Ticket. The league indicated it would appeal the ruling if the judge does not set it aside.	
27	The first presidential debate occurs earlier than the three dates previously planned by the Commission on Presidential Debates. The event is hosted by CNN out of its studios in Atlanta, Georgia, without an audience present.	
30	The 24th BET Awards airs from the Peacock Theater.	

=== July ===
Date	Event	Ref.
1	Bally Sports Detroit indefinitely suspends Detroit Tigers color commentator Craig Monroe after it is announced he is being investigated for sex crimes in Charlotte County, Florida against a now 35-year-old woman starting when she was 12.	
7	Paramount Global agrees to an $8 billion merger with Skydance Media, Kohlberg Kravis Roberts and RedBird Capital Partners in which the consortium would acquire National Amusements from the family of Sumner Redstone, who purchased Viacom in 1987 and later Paramount Pictures and CBS and died in 2020. The new company intends to combine Skydance's technological advancements with Paramount's legacy intellectual property, with select portions of the Paramount portfolio remaining open to divestiture (BET Networks has several separate suitors).	
11	The 2024 ESPY Awards airs on ABC at the Dolby Theatre in Hollywood, with Serena Williams as host.	
13	The 37th Annual Nickelodeon Kids' Choice Awards airs on Nickelodeon and streams on Paramount+ from Pauley Pavilion in Los Angeles, with SpongeBob SquarePants and Patrick Star as hosts to celebrate the 25th anniversary of SpongeBob SquarePants.	
15	In the wake of the attempted assassination of Donald Trump on July 13, MSNBC preempts this day's broadcast of Morning Joe in favor of general breaking news coverage. The absence was attributed to a desire by the network to prevent offensive content from reaching air. It returned to air the following morning.	
15	Comedy Central preempts this evening's broadcast of The Daily Show from its air in the wake of Trump's assassination attempt, and canceled its plans to air the show live from Milwaukee during the Republican National Convention. It returned to air the following evening in New York.	
15–18	The 2024 Republican National Convention takes place at Fiserv Forum in Milwaukee, along with associated coverage.	
24	Eight days after its board of governors approved them, the NBA announces new 11-year deals, beginning with its 2025–2026 season, with ESPN/ABC, NBCUniversal, and Amazon Prime Video. The deals, which total $76 billion, feature a reduced NBA game package on ESPN/ABC (though ABC will keep the NBA Finals), prime time games and the All-Star Weekend on NBC (a reuniting of that network with the league it carried from 1990 to 2002), streaming-exclusive games on NBC's Peacock and Prime Video (with the latter carrying the in-season NBA Cup), and WNBA games from 2026 thru 2036 on the same networks. The Prime Video package was matched by longtime NBA partner TNT Sports, who exercised an option in an existing deal that ends the 2024–2025 season, but the league stated that TNT parent Warner Bros. Discovery did not make a "true match". WBD then filed suit against the league on July 25 claiming that they did offer a "true match". The two parties then agreed to a settlement in November, with TNT Sports retaining some international live game rights, as well as domestic non-game rights on NBA TV and the NBA's digital platforms. The 2024–25 season would still mark the end of the TNT network airing live games in the U.S. since 1989, and TNT Sports' overall such relationship since 1984 on TBS. In a separate sublicensing agreement, TNT's Inside the NBA studio show will move to ESPN/ABC in 2025–26.	
26–August 11	The 2024 Summer Olympics, taking place in Paris, France, air in English on NBC, its cable sister networks (USA Network, CNBC, E!), and the Peacock streaming service, and in Spanish on Telemundo and Universo.	
30	CBS News announces that Norah O'Donnell would resign from the anchor role at the CBS Evening News after the U.S. election cycle. O'Donnell, who had been Evening News' anchor and managing editor since July 2019, remains with CBS as a contributor of long-form reports and interviews for various CBS News programs. On August 1, CBS would announce that the Evening News would adopt a new format after O'Donnell departs, including the use of multiple anchors and an ensemble team of correspondents.	

=== August ===
Date	Event	Ref.
2	After weeks of speculation about his status at the network, Skip Bayless announces on social media that he would be immediately leaving Fox Sports 1, where he had co-hosted the weekday debate show Undisputed.	
14	The team of Ike and Alan Barinholtz win the $1 million top prize for their charity, the ASL Program at Los Encinos School, on Who Wants to Be a Millionaire, becoming the second top prize winners on the primetime revival and the second celebrities to win the top prize after David Chang (who won that top prize money for his chosen charity, Southern Smoke Foundation on the November 29, 2020 episode), as well as marking the first time in the history of ABC game show's franchise that a team of two contestants win the top prize (Ike also previously won $125,000 for his charity, Uplift Family Services, in an episode which broadcast on April 22, 2020).	
19–22	The 2024 Democratic National Convention takes place at the United Center in Chicago, along with associated coverage.	
22	Fred Armisen and The 8G Band make their final on-air appearance on Late Night with Seth Meyers due to budget cuts imposed on the show by NBC, although they remain the show's house band via pre-recorded music.	
26	The Big Ten Network is removed on Comcast/Xfinity systems in California, Oregon, and Washington after the cable provider reportedly declines to pay a higher "in-market" rate for the channel. The blackout comes the week that teams from USC, UCLA, and the universities of Oregon and Washington begin competition as Big Ten Conference members. Comcast and BTN would resolve their dispute on October 10, resulting in the channel being added to Comcast's basic tier.	

=== September ===
Date	Event	Ref.
1	The Walt Disney Company pulls its networks from DirecTV after the two sides failed to reach a distribution deal. The removal, which includes ABC Owned Television Stations and ESPN, comes hours before a USC-LSU college football game on ABC (KABC-TV in USC's home market of Los Angeles is among the stations taken off the satellite provider), and also affects ESPN's coverage of the US Open tennis tournament, as well as the Monday Night Football season premiere between the New York Jets and San Francisco 49ers (the ABC stations representing both cities, WABC-TV and KGO-TV, were also impacted by the blackout). On September 7, DirecTV filed a complaint with the FCC, claiming Disney has violated the commission's good-faith mandates by predicating any licensing agreement on DirecTV's waiving any legal claims on Disney's "anti-competitive actions," including its ongoing packaging and minimum penetration demands. The blackout ended on September 14 when the sides reached "an agreement in principle". The companies are reportedly working to finalize a long-term deal.	
9	Jorge Ramos announces he would depart Noticias Univision at the end of the year after he and TelevisaUnivision announced a mutual agreement to not renew his contract and resign. Ramos has been with Univision's news division for 40 years, and had anchored weeknight newscast Noticiero Univision and hosting the Sunday public affairs program Al Punto.	
9	In the finals of the sixteenth installment of American Ninja Warrior, Vance Walker became the first contestant to win a second $1 million grand prize for achieving Total Victory twice consecutively, after becoming the third contestant to win the $1 million grand prize last year. Similarly, another contestant, Caleb Bergstrom, also have completed the final stage, but at a slower time just like Daniel Gil did in a season prior, and thus did not win the grand prize.	
9	The 42nd season in the long-running syndicated game show Wheel of Fortune premieres with Ryan Seacrest taking over Pat Sajak as the host, though Sajak would remain host for the fifth season of the Celebrity counterpart, which aired in 2025.	
10	The second presidential debate, the first between Vice President Kamala Harris and former President Donald Trump, takes place at the National Constitution Center's theater in Philadelphia, organized and originated by ABC News, with World News Tonight anchors David Muir and Linsey Davis moderating as part of a multi-network simulcast with ABC.	
11	The 2024 MTV Video Music Awards airs on MTV, Paramount+ and other Paramount Global cable channels from UBS Arena in Elmont, New York. Originally scheduled for September 10, the date was rescheduled for one day to avoid conflicts with the presidential debate.	
12	Metro Detroit businessman Kevin Adell announces he is attempting to sell locally owned and operated MyNetworkTV affiliate WADL as well as talk radio station WFDF and religious broadcaster The Word Network and plans to retire.	
15	The 76th Primetime Emmy Awards airs on ABC from the Peacock Theater with the father/son duo of Eugene Levy and Dan Levy as hosts.	
23	KFOR/Oklahoma City and civil liberties group Institute for Free Speech file a motion for a temporary restraining order and preliminary injunction against Public Instruction Superintendent Ryan Walters and Press Secretary Dan Isett, on grounds that journalists for the Nexstar-owned NBC affiliate had been denied access to the Oklahoma State Board of Education's public meetings and press conferences for several months. The claimants are seeking damages of $17.91, an amount symbolically referencing the year of the First Amendment's ratification. Oklahoma Western District Court Judge Bernard Jones would grant a 14-day restraining order against Walters and Isett on September 25, the day prior to the OSDE's next scheduled public meeting.	
24	The 17th Academy of Country Music Honors, hosted by Carly Pearce and Jordan Davis, airs on Merit Street.	
26	Hoda Kotb announces that she would leave Today, which she has co-anchored with Savannah Guthrie and Jenna Bush Hager, after seventeen years on the air. Kotb departs from the show in January 2025, though she reiterated that she would remain with NBC News in some capacity.	
26	The 2024 People's Choice Country Awards airs on NBC from the Grand Ole Opry House in Nashville, Tennessee with Shania Twain as host.	
28	Jeff Glor signs off as host of CBS Saturday Morning in the wake of his layoff, along with those of other Paramount Global employees, earlier in the week. Glor had been with CBS News since 2007, a tenure that in addition to correspondent work and hosting Saturday Morning also included anchoring the weeknight CBS Evening News from 2017 to 2019.	
30	DirecTV announces its plans to acquire rival satellite company Dish Network from EchoStar for only $1, which would merge the two companies and would both be owned by private equity firm TPG Inc. The deal comes hours after TPG announced it would fully acquire AT&T's 70% share in DirecTV in a $7.6 billion deal that marks AT&T's exit from the satellite TV business. The newly merged DirecTV-Dish entity would continue to support the Dish brand for the foreseeable future, meaning Dish subscribers would not be forced into using DirecTV as a result of the merger. EchoStar and DirecTV expect the deal to close in the fourth quarter of 2025, contingent on regulatory approval and bondholders writing off nearly $1.6 billion in Dish-related debt.	

=== October ===
Date	Event	Ref.
1	Disney Television Studios announces the immediate closure of its ABC Signature studio, whose history dates back to its origins as Touchstone Television in 1985. ABC Signature's remaining operations and programs are folded into sister studio 20th Television.	
1	The vice presidential debate between Minnesota Governor Tim Walz and Ohio Senator JD Vance takes place with CBS News moderating.	
8	Major League Baseball announces that its media division would handle production and distribution of local broadcasts for the Cleveland Guardians, Milwaukee Brewers, and Minnesota Twins beginning in 2025, joining the Arizona Diamondbacks, Colorado Rockies, and San Diego Padres as having their broadcasts produced in-house by MLB. The Guardians', Brewers', and Twins' broadcasts had been respectively carried by Bally Sports' Great Lakes, Wisconsin and North networks, and the move comes as Bally's bankrupt parent, Diamond Sports Group, announced on October 2 that 11 of the 12 MLB teams it carried in 2024 (the Atlanta Braves being the exception) would be allowed to renegotiate terms or seek new TV partners. In a separate move, MLB also announces that the Texas Rangers would leave Bally Sports Southwest, with the team reportedly seeking to create its own regional sports network.	
13	Kenny Albert calls Fox Sports' broadcast of a National Football League game between the Cleveland Browns and Philadelphia Eagles, and in doing so becomes the first broadcaster to call 500 NFL games for a single network.	
15	The 2024 BET Hip Hop Awards are held with Fat Joe hosting.	
16	Dennis Miller announces he would resign as president of The CW at the end of the month, with entertainment president Brad Schwartz succeeding him. Miller had joined The CW when Nexstar purchased a majority interest in the network in 2022, and during his tenure the network canceled or ended their high-end, youth-appealing scripted dramas in favor of broader-appealing entertainment and sports programming.	
27	WNEP-TV/Scranton–Wilkes-Barre, Pennsylvania runs a dummy graphic showing Kamala Harris taking Pennsylvania's electoral votes in the upcoming election during ABC's coverage of a Formula One race. While social media users decried it as evidence of cheating, the Tegna Inc.-owned station explained it was running a test to ensure its computer system was operating properly. The results were not intended to be shown on air.	
28	CNN announces it has banned Ryan Girdusky after the conservative commentator told Mehdi Hasan on the network's CNN NewsNight program "I hope your beeper doesn't go off," seeming to reference exploding pagers in Lebanon that killed members of Hezbollah in September. NewsNight anchor Abby Phillip denounces Girdusky's remark as soon as it was made, while the network released a statement indicating it would not tolerate "racism or bigotry" during its presentation of current events.	
29	Andrea Mitchell announces that she would resign as anchor at MSNBC following the presidential inauguration in early 2025, ending her program Andrea Mitchell Reports. However, she is expected to stay on as a reporter for MSNBC and NBC News, respectively.	
30	The Recording Academy announces that its Grammy Awards ceremonies and related ancillary programming will move to Disney-owned ABC, Disney+, and Hulu in a 10-year deal beginning with the 2027 Grammys. The new deal means an end to the academy's broadcast relationship with CBS, which has carried every Grammy ceremony since 1973 and will still carry the 2025 and 2026 ceremonies.	
30	The Los Angeles Dodgers defeat the New York Yankees to win Game 5 of the World Series. It is the 8th title in franchise's history and second since the shortened 2020 season. The Dodgers have become the first team in Major League history to beat both New York-based teams in postseason (they previously clinched the National League pennant over the New York Mets). As for the Yankees, they suffered a fifth inning meltdown by blowing a 5-run lead. This is the team's third World Series loss in the 21st century since 2001 and 2003 and first to lose at the current Yankee Stadium. Freddie Freeman was awarded the Willie Mays Most Valuable Player due to his grand slam walk-off during Game 1, a first in World Series history.	

=== November ===
Date	Event	Ref.
2	Three days before the United States presidential election, Kamala Harris appears with her impersonator Maya Rudolph in the opening sketch on Saturday Night Live, a move Federal Communications Commission commissioner Brendan Carr claims is a violation of the equal-time rule stating that broadcasters must allow equal time to opposing political candidates. SNL creator and executive producer Lorne Michaels earlier said that neither Harris nor Donald Trump would be invited to appear during the show's landmark 50th season. NBC responded by filing a notice with the FCC and allowing Trump to address voters during the Xfinity 500 NASCAR race and during the Sunday Night Football matchup between the Indianapolis Colts and the Minnesota Vikings the following day.	
5	The 2024 presidential election and other federal and state races occur, along with associated coverage.	
8	As part of its quarterly earnings report, AMC Networks reveals it purchased on November 1 the 50.1% of BBC America it did not already own, giving AMC full control of the channel it had shared with Britain's BBC.	
14	A federal judge approves a plan for Diamond Sports Group to re-emerge from a 20-month-long Chapter 11 bankruptcy process, allowing the owner of the FanDuel Sports Network regional channels (which rebranded from Bally Sports in October) to continue as a viable (albeit slimmed-down) company. Coincidentally after the ruling, Major League Baseball announces that the Cincinnati Reds would become the seventh team to have their local television broadcasts produced by MLB's production arm (see also 10/8/2024 entry); Reds games had been on what was previously known as Bally Sports Ohio, which the Reds had a 20% interest in before selling their stake back to Diamond for $1.	
15	In a unanimous decision, Jake Paul defeats Mike Tyson in an 8-round bout at AT&T Stadium in Arlington, Texas. The fight broadcast on Netflix attracts an estimated global audience of 60 million, but also an estimated 100,000 complaints about its video quality, stream buffering, and various disconnections.	
20	Comcast announces its intent to separate cable networks MSNBC, CNBC, USA Network, Oxygen, E!, Syfy, and Golf Channel into a separate company controlled by its shareholders (tentatively billed as "SpinCo" but given the "Versant" name in May 2025), a transaction that completed on January 2, 2026. Bravo will remain under the NBCUniversal umbrella alongside the NBC and Telemundo networks, their related news and sports divisions, and the Peacock streaming service. Universal Kids (which was not mentioned in the announcement) would shut down the following year.	
20	The 58th Annual Country Music Association Awards airs on ABC from the Bridgestone Arena in Nashville, Tennessee with Luke Bryan, Peyton Manning and Lainey Wilson as hosts.	
24	The Simpsons episode "Treehouse of Horror Presents: Simpsons Wicked This Way Comes" airs on Fox, the last Simpsons episode with Pamela Hayden as a member of the voice cast. Hayden, who voiced several characters, most notably Milhouse Van Houten and Jimbo Jones, since the show's debut in 1989, announced her retirement a few days before the episode aired. Her roles are expected to be recast.	
28	The 98th Macy's Thanksgiving Day Parade in New York City airs on NBC and Peacock, attracting 31.5 million viewers (24 million for the live morning broadcast on NBC alone) and surpassing the event's record audience set one year earlier. NBC/Peacock is the only TV home for the parade; CBS, which provided unofficial and unauthorized coverage of the event through 2023, discontinued the practice without announcement for the first time in decades.	

=== December ===
Date	Event	Ref.
5–6	Two perennial animated holiday specials move to new broadcast homes as Frosty the Snowman and Rudolph the Red-Nosed Reindeer air on NBC on December 5 and 6 respectively (the latter coinciding with the 60th anniversary date of its first airing). The specials, which were produced by Rankin/Bass Productions and whose rights are owned by Universal Studios, had aired on CBS for decades (Frosty since its premiere airing in 1969, Rudolph since 1972 following 8 years on NBC). NBCUniversal had licensed both specials to CBS, and had denied CBS permission to stream them on its Paramount+ and pay-TV video on demand, though it did not stream the specials on Peacock and push viewers to purchase the specials instead through services such as its own Fandango at Home and on physical media. The move coincides with CBS' elimination of most of its remaining traditional holiday season programming, including Frosty Returns (which it had aired from 1995 until 2023), Robbie the Reindeer (which aired on and off from 2001 to 2023), and unofficial carriage of the Macy's Thanksgiving Day Parade (see 11/28/2024 entry).	
9	The Monday Night Football game for Week 14 of the 2024 NFL season features an alternate broadcast in which Bart Simpson leads the Cincinnati Bengals against his father Homer and the Dallas Cowboys. The remaining members of the Simpson family act as production crew for the telecast, which airs on Disney+, ESPN+, and NFL+ while ABC and ESPN carries the traditional broadcast with Joe Buck and Troy Aikman as commentators. Although the game is eligible for flex-scheduling, due to the commitment of creating pre-recorded content around the scheduled matchup, it was unable to be switched out for another game on the week's schedule despite the playoff standing (or lack thereof) of the two teams.	
12	Chuck Scarborough anchors the evening newscast at WNBC/New York City for the final time, ending a 50-year anchor tenure at NBC's flagship O&O. Scarborough terms it as a "retirement with an asterisk" as he would still make occasional contributions to various WNBC broadcasts.	
12	The 2024 Billboard Music Awards airs on Fox and Paramount+, with Michelle Buteau hosting the ceremony.	
19	Neil Cavuto signs off from Fox News, ending a career as an anchor at the network (most notably on the weekday show Your World) that dates back to its launch in 1996.	
19	Dan Abrams signs off from his primetime show, Dan Abrams Live, which aired on NewsNation for three years. Abrams decided to end the show due to scheduling conflicts between his primetime show and other businesses he manages. Abrams, however, remains on the network on a more limited basis.	
20	Netflix announces it has secured U.S. rights to the 2027 and 2031 FIFA Women's World Cup soccer competitions, the streamer's first exclusive acquisition of a sports broadcast property.	
25	Netflix airs its first two National Football League broadcasts, a Christmas Day doubleheader of Kansas City at Pittsburgh followed by Baltimore at Houston (the latter game featuring a live halftime show starring Beyoncé). Unlike the streamer's carriage of the Jake Paul-Mike Tyson fight on November 15, the picture, sound, and streaming quality of these live broadcasts are met with generally positive reviews.	
31	In a pivot from Major League Baseball's October 8 announcement that the league would produce and distribute local Milwaukee Brewers telecasts, the Brewers announce that its games would remain on FanDuel Sports Network Wisconsin (formerly Bally Sports Wisconsin) in the 2025 season.	

== Television shows ==
=== Shows changing networks ===
Show	Moved from	Moved to	Source
Chad	TBS	The Roku Channel	
Impractical Jokers	truTV	TBS	
American Music Awards	ABC	CBS	
Golden Globe Awards	NBC	CBS	
Big Nate	Nickelodeon / Paramount+	Nicktoons	
Rugrats	Nickelodeon / Paramount+	Nicktoons	
The Tourist	HBO Max	Netflix	
Star Trek: Prodigy	Paramount+	Netflix	
Girls5eva	Peacock	Netflix	
Temptation Island	USA Network	Netflix	
WWE NXT	USA Network	The CW	
61st Street	AMC	The CW	
Snowpiercer	TNT	AMC	
9-1-1	Fox	ABC	
WWE SmackDown	Fox	USA Network	
Leverage: Redemption	Amazon Freevee	Amazon Prime Video	
MLB Sunday Leadoff	Peacock	The Roku Channel	
Monsters at Work	Disney+	Disney Channel	

=== Milestone episodes and anniversaries ===
Show	Network	Episode #	Episode title	Episode airdate	Source
Late Night with Seth Meyers	NBC	10th anniversary	Guests: Amy Poehler, U.S. President Joe Biden	February 26	
The Rookie	ABC	100th episode	"The Hammer"	February 27	
Peppa Pig	Nick Jr.	20th anniversary	"Mr. Bull is Getting Married/Getting Ready for the Wedding/Wedding Day"	March 25	
Blaze and the Monster Machines	Nick Jr.	150th episode	"The Robot Championship"	April 1	
9-1-1	ABC	100th episode	"Buck, Bothered and Bewildered"	April 4	
The Conners	ABC	100th episode	"Smash and Grab and Happy Death Day"	April 10	
Station 19	ABC	100th episode	"My Way"	April 11	
Grown-ish	Freeform	100th episode	"California Love"	April 17	
Last Week Tonight with John Oliver	HBO	300th episode	"Public Libraries"	May 5	
Law & Order	NBC	500th episode	"No Good Deed"	May 9	
All American	The CW	100th episode	"100%"	May 27	
Watch What Happens Live with Andy Cohen	Bravo	15th anniversary	"WWHL 15th Anniversary Special"	June 30	
Who Wants to Be a Millionaire	ABC	25th anniversary	—	July 10 – August 28	
SpongeBob SquarePants	Nickelodeon	300th episode	"PL-1413"	July 15	
SpongeBob SquarePants	Nickelodeon	300th episode	"In the Mood to Feud"	July 16	
SpongeBob SquarePants	Nickelodeon	25th anniversary	"Mooned!"	July 17	
Family Guy	Fox/Hulu	25th anniversary	"Peter, Peter, Pumpkin Cheater"	October 14	
Teen Titans Go!	Cartoon Network	400th episode	"Bookyman"	October 19	
Dancing with the Stars	ABC	500th episode	"500th Episode"	November 12	
The Simpsons	Fox/Disney+	35th anniversary	"O C'mon All Ye Faithful"	December 17	

=== Shows returning in 2024 ===
Show	Last aired	Type of return	Previous channel	New/returning/same channel	Return date	Source
Friday Night Vibes	2022	Revival	TBS	same	January 5	
Cash Cab (as Cash Cab Music)	2020	Revival	Bravo	AXS TV	January 8	
Caillou	2010	Revival	PBS Kids	Peacock	February 15	
What Would You Do?	2020	Revival	ABC	same	February 18	
X-Men (as X-Men '97)	1997	Revival	Fox Kids	Disney+	March 20	
American Rust	2021	New season	Showtime	Amazon Prime Video	March 28	
Good Times (as Good Times: Black Again)	1979	Reboot	CBS	Netflix	April 12	
Dora the Explorer (as Dora)	2019	Reboot	Nickelodeon	Paramount+	April 12	
The Jinx (as The Jinx – Part 2)	2015	Revival	HBO	same	April 21	
The Joy of Painting (as The Joy of Painting with Nicholas Hankins: Bob Ross's Unfinished Season)	1994	Revival	PBS	same	May 3	
Dinner and a Movie	2011	Revival	TBS	same	June 1	
Who Wants to Be a Millionaire	2021	New season	ABC	same	July 10	
Dance Moms (as Dance Moms: A New Era)	2019	Reboot	Lifetime	Hulu	August 7	
Yo Gabba Gabba! (as Yo Gabba Gabbaland!)	2015	Revival	Nickelodeon	Apple TV+	August 9	
Trivial Pursuit	2009	Reboot	First-run syndication	The CW	October 3	
Scrabble	2012	Reboot	The Hub	The CW	October 3	
Scare Tactics	2013	Reboot	Syfy	USA Network	October 4	
Barney & Friends (as Barney's World)	2010	Reboot	PBS	HBO Max/Cartoon Network	October 14	
Matlock	1995	Reboot	NBC/ABC	CBS	October 17	
Wonder Pets (as Wonder Pets: In the City)	2016	Reboot	Nickelodeon/Nick Jr	Apple TV+	December 13	
Saturday Night's Main Event	2008	Revival	NBC	NBC/Peacock	December 14	

=== Shows ending in 2024 ===
End date	Show	Channel	First aired	Status	Source
January 3	Magnum P.I.	NBC	2018	Ended	
January 4	The Brothers Sun	Netflix	2024	Canceled	
January 11	Sonic Prime	Netflix	2022	Ended	
January 13	The Ghost and Molly McGee	Disney Channel	2021	Canceled	
January 19	Chad	The Roku Channel	2021	Canceled	
January 25	In the Know	Peacock	2024	Canceled	
January 31	Celebrity Squares	VH1	2023	Canceled	
February 1	Clone High	Max	2002	Canceled	
February 12	America's Got Talent: Fantasy League	NBC	2024	Canceled	
February 13	La Brea	NBC	2021	Ended	
February 16	Life & Beth	Hulu	2022	Canceled	
February 20	Quantum Leap	NBC	2022	Canceled	
February 21	Danger Force	Nickelodeon	2020	Canceled	
February 22	Double Cross	Allblk	2020	Canceled	
February 25	CNN This Morning (original weekday run)	CNN	2022	Canceled	
February 29	Bossy Bear	Nickelodeon	2023	Ended	
March 5	Good Trouble	Freeform	2019	Canceled	
March 5	Death and Other Details	Hulu	2024	Canceled	
March 8	Hightown	Starz	2020	Canceled	
March 13	Feud	FX	2017	Canceled	
March 14	Girls5eva	Netflix	2021	Canceled	
March 14	The Tall Tales of Jim Bridger	INSP	2024	Canceled	
March 16	SNL Vintage	NBC	2014	Ended	
March 20	That Girl Lay Lay	Nickelodeon	2021	Ended	
March 21	Halo	Paramount+	2022	Canceled	
March 22	Buying Beverly Hills	Netflix	2022	Canceled	
March 26	Extended Family	NBC	2023	Canceled	
March 27	Constellation	Apple TV+	2024	Canceled	
March 28	American Rust	Amazon Prime Video	2021	Canceled	
April 4	Tokyo Vice	Max	2022	Canceled	
April 7	Curb Your Enthusiasm	HBO	2000	Ended	
April 8	Spirit Rangers	Netflix	2022	Ended	
April 10	King Charles	CNN	2023	Ended	
April 12	Good Times: Black Again	Netflix	2024	Canceled	
April 15	Alice's Wonderland Bakery	Disney Jr.	2022	Ended	
April 22	Nature Cat	PBS Kids	2015	Ended	
April 24	Not Dead Yet	ABC	2023	Canceled	
April 25	Dead Boy Detectives	Netflix	2024	Canceled	
May 1	Star Wars: The Bad Batch	Disney+	2021	Ended	
May 1	Chucky	Syfy/USA Network	2021	Canceled	
May 5	Parish	AMC	2024	Canceled	
May 6	Bob Hearts Abishola	CBS	2019	Ended	
May 6	NCIS: Hawaiʻi	CBS	2021	Canceled	
May 9	The Girls on the Bus	Max	2024	Canceled	
May 16	Young Sheldon	CBS	2017	Ended	
May 16	Outer Range	Amazon Prime Video	2022	Canceled	
May 16	So Help Me Todd	CBS	2022	Canceled	
May 17	NFL Total Access (returned in 2026)	NFL Network	2003	Canceled	
May 18	Hailey's On It!	Disney Channel	2023	Canceled	
May 19	CSI: Vegas	CBS	2021	Canceled	
May 20	So You Think You Can Dance	Fox	2005	Canceled	
May 21	The Good Doctor	ABC	2017	Ended	
May 22	Grown-ish	Freeform	2018	Ended	
May 26	Wicked Tuna	National Geographic	2012	Canceled	
May 26	Summer House: Martha's Vineyard	Bravo	2023	Canceled	
May 26	Beacon 23	MGM+	2023	Canceled	
May 30	Star Trek: Discovery	Paramount+	2017	Ended	
May 30	Station 19	ABC	2018	Ended	
May 31	We're Here	HBO	2020	Canceled	
May 31	Jessica's Big Little World	Cartoon Network	2023	Canceled	
June 6	Sweet Tooth	Netflix	2021	Ended	
June 9	French Open on NBC	NBC/Peacock	1983	Ended	
June 11	NASCAR Race Hub	Fox Sports 1	2009	Canceled	
June 11	Farmhouse Fixer	HGTV	2021	Canceled	
June 12	The Big Door Prize	Apple TV+	2023	Canceled	
June 13	Looney Tunes Cartoons	Max	2020	Canceled	
June 20	Pretty Little Liars	Max	2022	Canceled	
June 23	Gordon Ramsay: Uncharted	National Geographic	2019	Canceled	
June 26	Walker	The CW	2021	Canceled	
June 27	My Lady Jane	Amazon Prime Video	2024	Canceled	
July 1	Star Trek: Prodigy	Netflix	2021	Canceled	
July 6	The Incredible Dr. Pol	Nat Geo Wild	2011	Canceled	
July 10	Kamp Koral: SpongeBob's Under Years	Paramount+	2021	Ended	
July 10	Reginald the Vampire	Syfy	2022	Canceled	
July 11	Vikings: Valhalla	Netflix	2022	Ended	
July 12	Exploding Kittens	Netflix	2024	Canceled	
July 16	Catfish: The TV Show	MTV	2012	Canceled	
July 16	The Acolyte	Disney+	2024	Canceled	
July 17	Unprisoned	Hulu	2023	Canceled	
July 24	Gordon Ramsay's Food Stars	Fox	2023	Canceled	
August 1	Unstable	Netflix	2023	Canceled	
August 2	Bunk'd	Disney Channel	2015	Ended	
August 2	Undisputed	Fox Sports 1	2016	Ended	
August 8	The Umbrella Academy	Netflix	2019	Ended	
August 8	Mr. Throwback	Peacock	2024	Canceled	
August 8	The Fairly OddParents: A New Wish	Nickelodeon	2024	Paused	
August 21	Time Bandits	Apple TV+	2024	Canceled	
August 22	Evil	Paramount+	2019	Ended	
August 22	That '90s Show	Netflix	2023	Canceled	
August 25	Orphan Black: Echoes	AMC	2024	Canceled	
August 26	Big Nate	Paramount+	2022	Canceled	
August 29	Kaos	Netflix	2024	Canceled	
August 29	Terminator Zero	Netflix	2024	Canceled	
August 30	The Serpent Queen	Starz	2022	Canceled	
September 4	Sunny	Apple TV+	2024	Canceled	
September 4	The Real CSI: Miami	CBS	2024	Canceled	
September 15	IndyCar Series on NBC	NBC	2009	Ended	
September 19	Lucky 13	ABC	2024	Canceled	
September 19	Twilight of the Gods	Netflix	2024	Canceled	
September 22	Snowpiercer	AMC	2020	Ended	
September 27	Blue's Clues & You!	Nickelodeon/Nick Jr./Treehouse TV/YouTube	2019	Canceled	
September 27	How to Die Alone	Hulu	2024	Canceled	
September 30	All American: Homecoming	The CW	2022	Canceled	
October 3	Heartstopper	Netflix	2022	Ended	
October 3	Velma	Max	2023	Canceled	
October 4	Power Book II: Ghost	Starz	2020	Ended	
October 6	SEAL Team	Paramount+	2017	Ended	
October 17	The Pradeeps of Pittsburgh	Amazon Prime Video/Freevee	2024	Canceled	
October 18	Hysteria!	Peacock	2024	Canceled	
October 24	The Old Man	FX	2022	Canceled	
October 24	Monster High	Nickelodeon	2022	Ended	
October 30	Grotesquerie	FX	2024	Canceled	
October 31	Teacup	Peacock	2024	Canceled	
November 1	Whose Line Is It Anyway?	ABC/ABC Family/The CW	1998	Canceled	
November 11	My Brilliant Friend	HBO	2018	Ended	
November 12	American Sports Story	FX	2024	Canceled	
November 14	Frasier	Paramount+	2023	Canceled	
November 21	Based on a True Story	Peacock	2023	Canceled	
November 21	Cruel Intentions	Amazon Prime Video	2024	Canceled	
November 23	Arcane	Netflix	2021	Ended	
November 24	The Franchise	HBO	2024	Canceled	
November 26	The Really Loud House	Nickelodeon	2022	Ended	
December 2	Superman & Lois	The CW	2021	Ended	
December 3	Angry Birds Mystery Island	Amazon Prime Video	2024	Ended	
December 4	The Summit	CBS	2024	Canceled	
December 6	The Sticky	Amazon Prime Video	2024	Canceled	
December 8	Somebody Somewhere	HBO	2022	Ended	
December 12	No Good Deed	Netflix	2024	Canceled	
December 13	Blue Bloods	CBS	2010	Ended	
December 15	Yellowstone	Paramount Network	2018	Ended	
December 16	What We Do in the Shadows	FX	2019	Ended	
December 19	The Dragon Prince	Netflix	2018	Ended	
December 19	Star Trek: Lower Decks	Paramount+	2020	Ended	
December 19	Laid	Peacock	2024	Canceled	
December 20	The Talk	CBS	2010	Ended	
December 27	AEW Rampage	TNT	2021	Canceled	
December 27	WWE NXT Level Up	Peacock	2022	Canceled	
December 29	What If...?	Disney+	2021	Ended	

=== Entering syndication in 2024 ===
A list of programs (current or canceled) that have accumulated enough episodes (between 65 and 100) or seasons (three or more) to be eligible for off-network syndication and/or basic cable runs.

Show	Seasons	In Production	Notes	Source
Suits	9	No	Broadcast syndication in local markets and on MyNetworkTV.	
The Conners	6	Yes	Broadcast syndication in local markets. The CW has aired primetime repeats of the show since January 4.	
Judy Justice	2	Yes	Broadcast syndication in local markets.	
Good Morning Football Overtime	8	Yes	Two-hour extension of the NFL Network program in local broadcast syndication.	
Bob Hearts Abishola	5	No	Broadcast syndication in local markets.	
NCIS: Hawaiʻi	3	No	Broadcast syndication in local markets.	

== Networks and services ==
=== Launches ===
Network/ service	Type	Launch date	Notes	Sources
The365	OTA multicast and OTT streaming	January 1	On November 7, 2023, Katz Broadcasting founder Jonathan Katz and his new firm, Free TV Networks, unveiled two new OTA and FAST networks. The365, which is aimed at African-American viewers, and Outlaw, which consists mainly of classic western films, respectively competes with the similarly themed Bounce TV and Grit, two multicast networks Katz's previous company founded and later sold in 2017 to the E. W. Scripps Company. Content for The365 and Outlaw initially comes from the libraries of Warner Bros. Discovery and Lionsgate, while Gray Television was the primary launch group for over-the-air distribution of the two networks (all three companies jointly operate Free TV Networks).	
Outlaw	OTA multicast and OTT streaming	January 1		
Merit Street	OTA multicast, OTT streaming, and cable/satellite	April 2 (Note: Merit Street was originally scheduled to launch on February 26, however on February 20, Merit Street Media announced the network's debut would be pushed back to April 2.)	On November 6, 2023, Dr. Phil McGraw announced plans to a new "news and entertainment" network named Merit Street Media (later shortened to Merit Street to differentiate from its parent company) in early 2024, which will be headquartered from an office and production facility based in the Dallas-Fort Worth metroplex. The network maintains a general entertainment format (featuring a mix of news, talk shows, unscripted series and weekend evening movie presentations), with programs that include a nightly show hosted by McGraw himself focused around the advice format he provided on his 2002–23 syndicated talk show. Joel Cheatwood, a former news director known for driving the local news operations he oversaw in the 1990s and 2000s towards sensationalism (most notably, Sunbeam Television stations WSVN/Miami and WHDH/Boston), serves as the network's CEO. Distribution of the network is handled by the Trinity Broadcasting Network, and is available on the religious broadcaster's owned-and-operated stations (on the DT2 subchannel previously occupied by TBN Inspire), on cable, satellite, and free AVOD streaming platforms. TBN also contracted with full-power stations in New York City (WMBC) and Los Angeles (KVMD) to carry Merit Street on their primary channels in order to assure must-carry coverage of the network on pay television providers in those markets.	(Note: On February 12, two weeks prior to the network's originally scheduled launch date, TBN shuffled the default subchannel placements of two of its in-house networks, TBN Inspire (moved from DT2 to DT3) and Smile (moved from DT3 to DT4), on its owned-and-operated stations to make room for Merit Street on their DT2 subchannels. Spanish-language sister network Enlace ceased distribution as a multicast offering on the TBN O&Os, although it remains available on select low-power affiliates, cable and satellite providers, and as a live feed on the parent ministry's TBN+ streaming service.)
The Network	AVOD OTT streaming	April 30	On March 19, The Network, an ad-supported premium streaming platform founded by film director Aram Rappaport (founder of creative advertising agency The Boathouse) with financial backing from BH Media Holdings, announced plans to launch on April 30. The Network's content strategy—premised on seeking to “declutter the streaming experience, eliminating audiences’ endless scrolling to find appealing series and films”—will expand its content gradually, releasing two original series at a time, with dramas debuting on Tuesdays and comedies debuting on Thursdays; the service's slate will initially launch with the thriller/sci-fi drama The Green Veil and British comedy Chivalry (the latter acquired from Channel 4).	
ZipWave TV	OTT streaming	June	On March 24, ZipWave LLC, a Wyoming-based technology company, announced the launch of its live OTT service ZipWave TV. Its lineup will consist of live news, entertainment and religious programming. Some of the networks it plans to offer at launch include Newsmax and FETV.	
MeTV Toons	OTA multicast	June 25	On May 1, Weigel Broadcasting announced the pending launch of MeTV Toons, an expansion of its existing programming deal with Warner Bros. Discovery to carry select animated programming from that company's library on its main channel MeTV. The new channel, which will combine Warner Bros. Discovery archival cartoons with licensed programming from other providers, will air primarily on digital subchannels, with a free ad-supported streaming version with limited programming also being made available for Internet viewing. The programming would effectively replicate the format which Warner Bros. Discovery and its predecessors had offered on the Boomerang cable network for the previous 24 years.	
Defy (Free TV Networks version)	OTA multicast and OTT streaming	July 1	On April 3, Free TV Networks announced the pending launch of Dare, an over-the-air subchannel and AVOD streaming network focusing on unscripted reality and documentary programming (including series such as American Pickers, Storage Wars, Pawn Stars, Alone, Swamp People, Counting Cars and Ax Men, among others). The network draws from the same A+E Networks reality library as Scripps Networks's Defy TV (both were developed by Free TV CEO Jonathan Katz, with Defy being created during his 2017–22 executive tenure at Scripps). Free TV Networks announced on July 1 that it had acquired the existing Defy TV trademarks from Scripps, allowing the network to launch on that date under the existing branding (although excising “TV” from the name), accompanied by much of the original network's programming lineup, under new ownership.	
Roku Sports Channel	OTT streaming	August 12	On August 7, 2024, Roku, Inc. announced plans to launch a new 24/7 free ad-supported streaming television (FAST) sports channel which is available exclusively on The Roku Channel. At launch, the channel will show live events from MLB Sunday Leadoff, Formula E and the NBA G League and live studio programming from The Rich Eisen Show and GMFB: Overtime.	
Victory+	OTT streaming	September 11	On July 7, 2024, the Dallas Stars of the National Hockey League signed a 7-year contract with Calgary-based A Parent Media Co., Inc. to create a free ad-supported streaming television service to become the exclusive in-market home of the Stars. On August 27, 2024, the Anaheim Ducks announced they had signed a 2-year contract to join the Stars on the service. It officially launched on September 11.	

=== Conversions and rebrandings ===
Old network name	New network name	Type	Conversion date	Notes	Source
Showtime (main linear channel)	Paramount+ with Showtime	Cable/satellite	January 8	On January 30, 2023, Paramount Global announced plans to rebrand the linear Showtime service and fully integrate its direct-to-consumer streaming service with the premium tier of co-owned Paramount+; the combined service would be branded as Paramount+ with Showtime, which had already been in use for a streaming bundle that launched in August 2022. Paramount began directing prospective Showtime streaming customers to subscribe to the ad-free Paramount+ tier on June 27, 2023; it would later discontinue the Showtime Anytime TV Everywhere app (offered to subscribers of the linear Showtime service) on December 14, and the standalone Showtime streaming service on December 31; the primary Showtime channel was renamed Paramount+ with Showtime on January 8, 2024, although the standalone Showtime nameplate remains in use as the branding for its seven multiplex channels and as a marketing imprint for the network's original programming. Paramount Global initially stated it had no plans to offer complimentary provider login access to Paramount+'s Showtime tier to subscribers of the premium channel's linear package (in contrast to the arrangement involving Warner Bros. Discovery-owned Max, which has been available free to linear HBO subscribers—replacing the HBO Go TV Everywhere platform—since the service launched in May 2020); however it would change course beginning on January 9, reaching deals with DirecTV (including co-owned DirecTV Stream and U-verse), Hulu and Charter Spectrum to offer the network's linear/VOD subscribers complimentary access to the namesake Paramount+ tier starting later in the year.	
Hallmark Drama	Hallmark Family	Cable/satellite	February 28	On February 5, during the Television Critics Association Winter Press Tour, Hallmark Media announced plans to rebrand Hallmark Drama as Hallmark Family on February 28, and Hallmark Movies & Mysteries as Hallmark Mystery on March 6. The changes effectively serve to clarify both networks' existing programming formats—the former centering around family- and faith-oriented programming, and the latter centering around mystery programs—both of which offer acquired series, and original (in the case of Hallmark Movies & Mysteries/Hallmark Mystery) and library (primarily sourced from Hallmark Channel) movies and mini-series.	
Hallmark Movies & Mysteries	Hallmark Mystery	Cable/satellite	March 6		
CBS News (streaming)	CBS News 24/7	OTT streaming	April 22	On April 9, Variety reported streaming offerings in recent that the CBS News streaming network would rebrand on April 22 as CBS News 24/7, as part of a broader expansion of its programming to include a new eponymous “whip-around” news program that will rely on reports sourced from the national CBS News division and local CBS stations, expansions of the political news show America Decides (from 30 minutes to an hour) and Primetime with John Dickerson (from one hour to 90 minutes, along with a name change to The Daily Report with John Dickerson), and the addition of the late night newscast CBS News Roundup.	
Defy TV (Scripps version)	Ion Plus (resumption of over-the-air multicast distribution)	OTA multicast and OTT streaming	July 1	On June 17, Scripps Networks disclosed on the social media profiles of Defy TV and Ion Plus that the latter network, which had transitioned an over-the-air multicast network to a free ad-supported streaming channel in February 2021 after Scripps's acquisition of Ion Media, would resume over-the-air clearance on Ion's stations (and other third-party affiliates) over the channel space occupied by Defy TV, which struggled to attain any long-term viewer sustainability with its 2010s-era reality/unscripted format mainly drawn from the A&E Networks library (this same issue had earlier resulted in Scripps merging the programming of female-targeted sister network TrueReal—which had its channel space subsequently leased over to Jewelry Television—into the male-focused Defy's schedule in March 2023). Ion Plus's existing schedule of procedural dramas will continue over-the-air with newer and higher-profile acquisitions (along with Canadian series and selected 1990s–2000s first-run syndicated dramas) airing as part of its schedule, and its existing AVOD availability wholly unaffected. Defy was then relaunched under the auspices of Free TV Networks at the same time (as detailed above, in the "Launches" section).	
Hallmark Movies Now	Hallmark+	OTT streaming	September 10	On July 11, it was announced that Hallmark Movies Now would relaunch as Hallmark+, serving as an auxiliary counterpart to Hallmart's suite of channels and as a loyalty program for Hallmark Gold Crown greeting card stores.	
Bally Sports	FanDuel Sports Network	Regional sports networks	October 21	On October 18, a federal judge presiding over the ongoing bankruptcy of Diamond Sports Group approved a new naming rights agreement between Diamond and FanDuel, allowing the sports betting company to apply its name to Diamond's 16 remaining RSNs that had worn the name of casino operator Bally's Corporation since 2021. The name change takes effect one day before the start of the 2024–25 NBA season.	

=== Closures ===
Network/ service	Type	End date	Notes	Source
Viaplay (U.S. service)	OTT streaming	February 29	On July 20, 2023, Viaplay Group announced that it would discontinue its Viaplay streaming services in the U.S., Canada and the United Kingdom (the former having launched just six months prior on February 22), and immediately ceased marketing to new subscribers in those regions. The move was part of a refocusing on its core markets of Scandinavia and the Netherlands, centering on its sports offering and the sale of non-sports content through its Viaplay Select business; about 25% of the company's staff were laid off as a result. On January 18, Viaplay confirmed that its U.S. service would shut down on February 29, and would refund monthly and annual subscribers for the remaining time of their subscription. Viaplay content will remain available in the U.S. through The Roku Channel, Xfinity (via its X1 and Flex tiers) and Xumo.	
MotorTrend+	OTT streaming	March 28	On February 23, Warner Bros. Discovery announced that it would be shutting down MotorTrend+ at the end of March. Subscribers will be migrated to the ad-free tier of Discovery+, while its programming library will be moved over to both Discovery+ and Max in stages until the service's closure.	
TV Japan	Cable/satellite	March 31	On February 17, TV Japan announced on its website that the NHK Cosmomedia America-owned network (which aired news and entertainment programs sourced from various broadcasters based in Japan, primarily from public broadcaster NHK as well as commercial networks such as Tokyo Broadcasting System Television, Nippon TV, TV Tokyo, Fuji Television and TV Asahi) would cease distribution on cable and satellite providers on March 31; much of its programming migrated to NHK's new streaming service Jme, which soft-launched ten days before and features a broader selection of programming than the schedule-limited wireline TV Japan channel and is priced comparably at $25/month.	
Funimation	OTT streaming	April 2	On February 7, Sony announced that the Funimation app and website would shut down on April 2, and that users would be able to migrate their account data to Crunchyroll until then.	
Showtime (streaming service)	OTT streaming	April 30	On January 30, 2023, Paramount announced plans to fully integrate the Showtime direct-to-consumer streaming service with the premium tier of the Paramount+ streaming service; the streaming tier rebrand replaces a bundle of the same name that launched in mid-2022. The cable-specific Showtime Anytime app was shut down by the end of the year. On April 11, 2024, Paramount announced that the standalone app would shut down on April 30.	
Bally Sports San Diego	Regional sports network	April	On May 20, 2023, Bally Sports San Diego ended its television contract with the San Diego Padres as part of the ongoing bankruptcy of Bally Sports' parent company. In April 2024, the network was liquidated following a settlement with the Padres.	
This TV	OTA multicast and Cable/satellite	May 31	Although no date was confirmed or announced, This TV shut down and merged with TheGrio.	
Longhorn Network	Cable/satellite	June 30	With the Texas Longhorns joining the Southeastern Conference, the standalone Longhorn Network, a channel devoted to the athletics program of the University of Texas at Austin, was discontinued as its programming was merged into the SEC Network. A free ad-supported streaming television version of the Longhorn Network was launched July 1, in partnership with Learfield Sports instead of previous partner ESPN.	
Pac-12 Network	Cable/satellite	June 30	With the departure of all but two of the Pac-12 Conference's teams to other conferences for the 2024–25 season, the Pac-12 Network was discontinued. The conference's production division continues to produce events for remaining members Washington State and Oregon State, including its home football and basketball games for the CW Sports division under a one-year contract, and the conference's FAST platform Pac-12 Insider continues to operate unaffected.	
Noggin	OTT streaming	July 2	On February 15, as part of a series of layoffs affecting 800 employees (or about 3% of its workforce), Paramount Global announced that it would shut down the Noggin subscription streaming service (which was launched in 2015 and is marketed to children ages two to seven), resulting in the termination of its entire staff. Much of the long-form and short-form content featured on the service will be shifted over to Paramount+'s Nick Jr. section (which already carries much of Nick Jr.'s library of preschool programming). Noggin would subsequently stop accepting new subscribers, while existing subscribers would be transitioned over to Paramount+ prior to the former's shutdown. This marks the second discontinuation of the Noggin edutainment brand by Paramount: it originally launched in February 1999 as a linear cable spinoff of Nickelodeon, aimed at preteens and teenagers, under a joint venture between predecessor company Viacom and Sesame Workshop; the Noggin network shifted its target audience to preschoolers in 2007 (after the teen-targeted nighttime block The N was spun off as a separate network, since renamed TeenNick, occupying Nickelodeon GaS's former channel space), and was later relaunched as Nick Jr. Channel in September 2009.	
NewsNet	OTA multicast	August 2	On the morning of August 2, 2024, NewsNet abruptly laid off its staff and ceased operations of both its main channel and its Sports News Highlights companion service, with owner Manoj Bhargava stating the networks had no measurable viewership. The networks, which largely served as direct-to-consumer platforms for Bhargava to advertise his 5-hour Energy brand of energy shots and drinks, were also embroiled in legal disputes with the owners of Sports Illustrated, which Bhargava had planned to cross-brand and integrate with the television networks before the brand was relicensed to another company.	
Sports News Highlights	OTA multicast	August 2		
KOOL TV	OTA broadcast, OTT streaming	August 8	The regional network airing on low-power stations in Minnesota ceased local programming July 1 after over nine years in operation, citing a lack of advertising revenue; the service shut down entirely a month later.	
NASA TV	Free-to-air satellite, OTT streaming	August 28	On July 29, the National Aeronautics and Space Administration announced the end of the linear NASA TV service after 52 years. It was the last direct-to-consumer television channel offered by the United States government. Select programs from the NASA TV library were made available on an on-demand Internet platform NASA+.	
Boomerang (streaming service)	OTT streaming	September 30	On August 2, Warner Bros. Discovery announced that it would be shutting down Boomerang's streaming service and some of its content would be migrated to Max.	
NBC Sports Chicago	Regional sports network	September 30	Following the announcement that the Chicago Blackhawks, Chicago Bulls, and Chicago White Sox would move their television rights to the new Chicago Sports Network, it was revealed that NBC Sports Chicago would shut down after the last game of the White Sox's season.	
Bally Sports New Orleans	Regional sports network	October 21	On October 16, 2024, Diamond revealed in a court filing it had reached a sponsorship agreement with FanDuel Group and intended to rebrand the Bally Sports networks as the FanDuel Sports Network; on October 18, Diamond officially announced the rebranding would take effect three days later. However, on October 21, the New Orleans network shut down instead of transitioning to the FanDuel Sports Network, due to the channel having lost their airing rights to the New Orleans Pelicans and Texas Rangers whenever their games were scheduled to play.	
Scripps News	Over-the-air multicast	November 15	On September 27, The E. W. Scripps Company announced they would suspend over-the-air broadcasting of their 24-hour linear news network, cutting more than 200 jobs in the process. Scripps claims that advertising revenue never materialized for the network due to a market largely hostile to buying airtime on news and politically oriented programming. Originally known as Newsy, Scripps purchased the network in 2014, and relaunched it with its current name in 2023. About 50 Scripps News staff will remain, providing news coverage for the company's local newsrooms and the network remaining on streaming and connected TV devices.	
The Weather Channel en Español	Cable/OTT streaming	December 31	On November 25, 2024, Allen Media Group announced the closure of the Spanish-language version of The Weather Channel after 2½ years of operation (and only months after it attained pay cable carriage), as part of a broader corporate downsizing in Allen's linear television business that will also see its sister network Pattrn reduced to segments on the mainline The Weather Channel service, and other Allen Media Group television properties reduced in personnel. The closure marked the second time that the Spanish-language version of the service had ceased operations; the service had previously operated as a cable channel in Latin America between 1996 and December 2002.	

== Television stations ==
=== Station launches ===
Date	Market	Station	Channel	Affiliation	Notes	Source
June 20	Green Bay, Wisconsin (Shawano)	WMEI	31.1	MeTV	Weigel Broadcasting launches WMEI on this date to serve the Green Bay–Fox Cities market with its suite of networks, and to expand its owned station reach northward along the western shore of Lake Michigan without the need for affiliation agreements with the area's existing stations. WBAY-TV continues to carry three of its other networks as subchannels for the time being, though the launch of WMEI returned access to MeTV over-the-air two years after its former carrier, NBC affiliate WGBA-TV, discontinued carriage of its channels to carry the networks of station parent Scripps. The signal is nulled to the north to avoid interference with Milwaukee's WITI on the same physical channel. The channel 31 allocation in the area formerly served as the post-digital transition home of WFXS-DT (channel 55), the Fox affiliate in Wausau from December 1, 1999, until July 1, 2015, when the station was wound down, after its intellectual property and programming was acquired by Gray Television (owner of CBS affiliate WSAW-TV) and the station was relaunched by Gray on a new low-power station as WZAW-LD (with the main Fox channel being rebroadcast as a WSAW subchannel to serve the entire market), and WFXS's owners turning in the channel 31 full-power license for cancellation on July 23, 2015 (WZAW-LD subsequently took the channel 33 virtual channel). The allocation was auctioned by the FCC in 2022, with Weigel the winner. As the allocation was licensed to Wittenberg in Shawano County (in the Green Bay market), Weigel asked the FCC to re-allocate the station to the county seat of Shawano instead, along with a move of the transmitter site to the Scray Hill site southwest of Green Bay to fully serve the market before launching the station.	
June 20	Green Bay, Wisconsin (Shawano)	WMEI	31.2	MeTV Toons		
June 20	Green Bay, Wisconsin (Shawano)	WMEI	31.3	Story Television		
June 20	Green Bay, Wisconsin (Shawano)	WMEI	31.4	MeTV+		
June 20	Green Bay, Wisconsin (Shawano)	WMEI	31.5	Movies!		

=== Subchannel launches ===
Date	Market	Station	Channel	Affiliation	Notes	Source
January 1	Atlanta, Georgia	WKTB-CD	47.6	Outlaw	See Outlaw and The365 entries in launches	
January 1	Boston, Massachusetts	WWDP	46.3	Outlaw	See Outlaw and The365 entries in launches	
January 1	Dover, Delaware–Salisbury, Maryland	WMDE	36.6	Outlaw	See Outlaw and The365 entries in launches	
January 1	Hartford, Connecticut	WWAX-LD	27.6	The365	See Outlaw and The365 entries in launches	
January 1	Hartford, Connecticut	WWAX-LD	27.7	Outlaw	See Outlaw and The365 entries in launches	
January 1	San Diego, California	KSKT-CD	43.8	Novelisima	See Outlaw and The365 entries in launches	
January 1	San Diego, California	KSKT-CD	43.9	Outlaw	See Outlaw and The365 entries in launches	
January 1	Sarasota–Tampa–St. Petersburg, Florida	WWSB	40.4	Outlaw	See Outlaw and The365 entries in launches	
January 1	Springfield, Massachusetts	WGGB-TV	40.4	Outlaw	See Outlaw and The365 entries in launches	
January 12	Pittsburgh, Pennsylvania	WOSC-CD	61.1	Rewind TV		
January 17	San Diego, California	KUSI-TV	51.2	Rewind TV		
February 1	Midland–Odessa, Texas	KPEJ-TV	24.4	Antenna TV		
May 10	Palm Springs, California	KRET-CD	45.6	Heroes & Icons		
June 25	Charlotte, North Carolina	WCCB	18.9	MeTV Toons	See MeTV Toons entry in launches	
June 25	Chicago, Illinois	WCIU-TV	26.7	MeTV Toons	See MeTV Toons entry in launches	
June 25	Cleveland, Ohio	WOCV-CD	35.3	MeTV Toons	See MeTV Toons entry in launches	
June 25	Denver, Colorado	KREG-TV	3.8	MeTV Toons	See MeTV Toons entry in launches	
June 25	Norcross, Georgia	WKTB-CD	47.7	MeTV Toons	See MeTV Toons entry in launches	
June 25	Palo Alto–San Francisco, California	KTLN-TV	68.6	MeTV Toons	See MeTV Toons entry in launches	
June 25	Philadelphia, Pennsylvania	WDPN-TV	2.10	MeTV Toons	See MeTV Toons entry in launches	
June 25	Phoenix, Arizona	KMOH-TV	6.5	MeTV Toons	See MeTV Toons entry in launches	
June 25	Seattle, Washington	KFFV	44.7	MeTV Toons	See MeTV Toons entry in launches	
June 25	Washington, D.C.	WDME-CD	48.5	MeTV Toons	See MeTV Toons entry in launches	
June 26	Sacramento–Stockton–Modesto, California	KMAX-TV	31.6	MeTV Toons	See MeTV Toons entry in launches	
August 14	Sacramento–Stockton–Modesto, California	KTFK-DT	64.6	Nuestra Visión		
September 1	Norfolk, Virginia	WVBT	43.4	Cozi TV		
September 1	Tucson, Arizona	KTTU-TV	18.5	Heroes & Icons		
September 1	Lafayette, Louisiana	KADN-TV	15.4	MeTV Toons		
September 23	Lafayette, Louisiana	KADN-TV	15.5	Dabl		
October 1	Paducah, Kentucky	WDKA	49.7	Chicago Sports Network		
October 1	Rockford, Illinois	WSLN	19.4	Chicago Sports Network Plus		
October 1	Rockford, Illinois	WIFR-LD	23.2	Antenna TV		
October 14	Tupelo, Mississippi	WTVA	9.4	Dabl		
December 4	Sacramento, California	KSAO-LD	49.10	FTF Sports		
December 4	Sacramento, California	KSAO-LD	49.11	MtrSpt1		
December 23	Sacramento, California	KSAO-LD	49.12	Outdoor America		

=== Stations changing network affiliations ===
Date	Market	Station	Channel	Prior affiliation	New affiliation	Notes	Source
January 1	Bellingham–Bellevue–Seattle–Tacoma, Washington	KUNS-TV	51.1	Univision	The CW	On September 28, 2023, it was announced that KUNS-TV would become the Seattle market's new CW affiliate on January 1, 2024, setting aside a temporary arrangement for the last quarter of 2023 on Sinclair sister station KOMO-DT2 (otherwise carrying Comet without any other local deviation) after CBS-owned KSTW's disaffiliation from the network on August 31. TelevisaUnivision was offered a KUNS subchannel by Sinclair in exchange, but outright refused the offer (as KUNS is the market's ATSC 3.0 lighthouse, it would have had lowered picture quality on any station that would host its ATSC 1.0 formatted subchannel in lieu of KUNS) to search for better carriage options. The removal of a major Spanish network (and the associated termination of its local news operation as part of KOMO-TV's staff) for a lower-profile English network attracted immediate outcry from the Puget Sound region's Latino and Hispanic community, which otherwise only has a Telemundo subchannel on KIRO-TV with no local news even in brief, and five minor Spanish Christian network on subchannels carried over-the-air, along with three Spanish-language radio stations (two of them Christian and other programs being brokered on other stations).	
January 1	Bellingham–Bellevue–Seattle–Tacoma, Washington	KVOS-TV	12.1	Heroes & Icons	Univision	Over the 2023 holiday season, KVOS's owner, Weigel Broadcasting, quietly updated their station's website to reflect Univision would move to KVOS's main channel on the same date; Weigel-owned H&I moved to its new channel position at subchannel 12.8. As the station serves as a border blaster serving the northern portion of the market (though not having any pay-TV coverage in Canada, which is served by Univision Canada), Univision's domestic schedule will also be available over-the-air in Vancouver, Victoria, and southwest British Columbia for the first time, and the deal settles an acrimony existing between Weigel and Univision since its flagship station, WCIU-TV in Chicago, lost Univision in that market in 1994 after the network purchased WGBO-TV over analog-era schedule limitations.	
February 1	Midland–Odessa, Texas	KMDF-LD	22.1	Antenna TV	The365	See January 1 entry in subchannel launches	
February 1	Prescott–Phoenix, Arizona	KAZT-TV	7.1	Independent	The CW	On January 8, 2024, Nexstar announced that it had reached an agreement with the owners of KAZT-TV to provide technical services and programming for the network beginning February 1. As part of this agreement, KAZT becomes an affiliate of The CW.	
February 2	Tupelo–Columbus–West Point, Mississippi	WLOV-TV	27.1	Fox	The CW+	On February 1, Morris Multimedia (owner of CBS affiliate WCBI-TV) announced that it would assume the rights to a shared services agreement involving Coastal Television-owned WLOV, taking over operational responsibilities from Allen Media Group (owner of rival NBC affiliate WTVA, which had managed WLOV since 1992 under the former's previous locally based ownership). Consequently, the deal prompted a series of affiliation switches between WLOV and two WCBI subchannels on February 2: Fox moved from WLOV (which had been affiliated with the network since 1995) to WCBI-DT2, while The CW Plus moved to WLOV from WCBI-DT3, which assumed the MyNetworkTV affiliation previously carried on that station's 4.2 subchannel. The move of Fox programming to WCBI-DT2 occurred despite the FCC's 2018 Quadrennial Media Ownership Review—approved by a 3–2 vote following a six-year delay on December 22, 2023—closing a loophole that allowed station operators to maintain multiple Big Four network affiliations using digital subchannels or low-power stations, including through the acquisition of another station's primary affiliation.	(Note: The Tupelo–Columbus–West Point market has never been large enough to support three independently-run network affiliates, and has long been dominated by the longer-established WTVA and WCBI; for this reason, in order to maintain any sustainable major network competition in the market, WTVA managed the operations of WLOV (which had struggled financially since signing on as ABC affiliate WVSB in 1983) and now-defunct WKDH (an ABC affiliate, owned by a company run by the son of then-WTVA owner Frank K. Spain, that operated from June 2001 to August 2012) under local marketing agreements. Three of the Big Four network affiliations in the market—NBC (WTVA, main channel), ABC (WKDH until its shutdown and WTVA-DT2 thereafter) and Fox (WLOV, main channel)—were under the control of WTVA's various owners (WTVA, Inc., Heartland Media and Allen Media) as a result from WKDH's sign-on until the LMA rights for WLOV transferred from Allen to Morris.)
April 2	Columbus, Georgia	WGBP-TV	66.1	NBC LX Home	Merit Street	See Merit Street entry in launches	
April 2	Dallas–Fort Worth, Texas	KTXD-TV	47.1	TBD	Merit Street	See Merit Street entry in launches	
April 2	Los Angeles, California	KVMD	31.1	Infomercials	Merit Street	See Merit Street entry in launches	
April 2	New York City	WMBC-TV	63.1	Independent	Merit Street	See Merit Street entry in launches	
April 2	San Francisco, California	KOFY-TV	20.1	Grit	Merit Street	See Merit Street entry in launches	
May 5	Archer Lodge–Raleigh–Durham, North Carolina	WFPX-TV	62.1	Bounce TV	Scripps News		
May 5	Bloomington–Indianapolis, Indiana	WCLJ-TV	42.1	Bounce TV	Scripps News		
May 5	Canton–Cleveland, Ohio	WDLI-TV	17.1	Bounce TV	Scripps News		
May 5	London–Columbus, Ohio	WSFJ-TV	51.1	Bounce TV	Scripps News		
May 18	Sacramento, California	KBTV-CD	8.1	Visión Latina	Buzzr		
May 29	Sacramento, California	KAHC-LD	43.1	RVTV	LATV		
June 25	Los Angeles, California	KSFV-CD	27.1	Jewelry Television	MeTV Toons		
June 25	Pittsburgh, Pennsylvania	WOSC-CD	61.1	Rewind TV	MeTV Toons		
June 25	Pittsburgh, Pennsylvania	WPTG-CD	69.1	This TV	Rewind TV		
August 5	Indianapolis, Indiana	WHMB-TV	40.1	Religious independent	Univision	Indianapolis’ WHMB and South Bend's WHME switched their primary channels to Univision.	
August 5	South Bend, Indiana	WHME-TV	46.1	Religious independent	Univision	Indianapolis’ WHMB and South Bend's WHME switched their primary channels to Univision.	
August 21	Silver Spring, Maryland (Washington, D.C.)	WJAL	68.1	ShopHQ	Merit Street		
September 1	Chicago, Illinois	WGN-TV	9.1	Independent	The CW	On May 1, 2024, Nexstar announced that WGN-TV would become a CW affiliate once again as well as WVBT and KLFY-TV adding the network to their digital subchannels.	
September 1	Chicago, Illinois	WCIU-TV	26.1	The CW	Independent	On May 1, 2024, Nexstar announced that WGN-TV would become a CW affiliate once again as well as WVBT and KLFY-TV adding the network to their digital subchannels.	
September 1	Detroit, Michigan	WMYD	20.1	The CW	Independent	On April 19, 2024, The Desk reported that the E. W. Scripps Company was planning to drop its CW affiliations from seven stations. These stations will become independent, with a focus on expanded local news and sports coverage. WMYD returns to independence after a short-term affiliation contract, due to the Mission/Nexstar's issues with acquiring WADL-TV to retain CW programming in the market and its later nullification. Later, on July 30 of that same year, Nexstar signed a new affiliation deal with Paramount's CBS News and Stations that not only renews the agreements with the 40 CBS affiliates Nexstar owns, but makes Paramount-owned stations WBFS and WKBD affiliates of The CW (WKBD returns to the network after departing the network for a year due to the WADL issues mentioned above). The next day, Nexstar announced that Sinclair-owned KSCC in Corpus Christi, News-Press & Gazette Company-operated KCOY-TV Santa Barbara and Tegna-owned KTTU Tucson would add CW programming, all effective September 1.	
September 1	Detroit, Michigan	WKBD-TV	50.1	Independent	The CW		
September 1	Miami, Florida	WBFS-TV	33.1	Independent	The CW		
September 1	Miami, Florida	WSFL-TV	39.1	The CW	Independent		
September 1	Portsmouth, Virginia	WGNT	27.1	The CW	Independent		
September 1	Tucson, Arizona	KWBA-TV	58.1	The CW	Independent		
September 1	Tucson, Arizona	KTTU-TV	18.1	MyNetworkTV	The CW		
September 16	Escanaba–Marquette, Michigan	WJMN-TV	3.1	MyNetworkTV	ABC (via WBUP)		
September 17	San Francisco, California (San Jose)	KRON-TV	4.1	The CW (primary) / MyNetworkTV (secondary)	The CW (full-time)	With the end of KRON's affiliation agreement for Fox-owned MyNetworkTV (which had been carried after KRON's late newscasts through the last year), the service moves in the Bay Area to Fox-owned KTVU's sister station KICU (branded as KTVU Plus), though it de facto remains an independent station otherwise as the service's programming airs at the latest broadcast day time possible in the graveyard slot, from 3 a.m.–5 a.m. on early Tuesday–Saturday mornings, with KICU retaining its prime time newscasts from KTVU unchanged.	
September 17	San Francisco, California (San Jose)	KICU-TV	36.1	Independent	MyNetworkTV		
November 16	Archer Lodge–Raleigh–Durham, North Carolina	WFPX-TV	62.1	Scripps News	Laff	See Scripps News entry in closures	
November 16	Bloomington–Indianapolis, Indiana	WCLJ-TV	42.1	Scripps News	Court TV	See Scripps News entry in closures	
November 16	Canton–Cleveland, Ohio	WDLI-TV	17.1	Scripps News	Grit	See Scripps News entry in closures	
November 16	Inglewood–Los Angeles, California	KILM	64.1	Scripps News	Laff	See Scripps News entry in closures	
November 16	London–Columbus, Ohio	WSFJ-TV	51.1	Scripps News	Ion Television	See Scripps News entry in closures	

=== Subchannels changing network affiliations ===
Date	Market	Station	Channel	Prior affiliation	New affiliation	Notes	Source
January 1	Amarillo, Texas	KEYU	31.3	Circle	Outlaw	See January 1 entry in subchannel launches	
January 1	Baltimore, Maryland	WQAW-LD	69.4	Infomercials	the365	See January 1 entry in subchannel launches	
January 1	Baltimore, Maryland	WQAW-LD	69.7	Infomercials	Outlaw	See January 1 entry in subchannel launches	
January 1	Baton Rouge, Louisiana	WAFB	9.3	Circle	the365	See January 1 entry in subchannel launches	
January 1	Boston, Massachusetts	WWDP	46.2	Quest	the365	See January 1 entry in subchannel launches	
January 1	Charleston, South Carolina	WCSC-TV	5.3	Circle	the365	See January 1 entry in subchannel launches	
January 1	Cleveland, Ohio	WOIO	19.4	Rewind TV	Outlaw	See January 1 entry in subchannel launches	
January 1	Cleveland, Ohio	WUAB	43.2	Circle	the365	See January 1 entry in subchannel launches	
January 1	Columbus, Georgia	WTVM	9.3	Circle	the365	See January 1 entry in subchannel launches	
January 1	Dallas–Fort Worth, Texas	KPFW-LD	18.5	Infomercials	Outlaw	See January 1 entry in subchannel launches	
January 1	Dallas–Fort Worth, Texas	KHPK-LD	28.5	Infomercials	Outlaw	See January 1 entry in subchannel launches	
January 1	Dallas–Fort Worth, Texas	KJJM-LD	34.7	Magnificent Movies Network	Outlaw	See January 1 entry in subchannel launches	
January 1	Dover, Delaware–Salisbury, Maryland	WMDE	36.5	Arirang TV	the365	See January 1 entry in subchannel launches	
January 1	Dover, Delaware–Salisbury, Maryland	WMDE	36.7	OnTV4U	Arirang TV	See January 1 entry in subchannel launches	
January 1	Detroit, Michigan	WUDL-LD	19.5	Magnificent Movies Network	the365	See January 1 entry in subchannel launches	
January 1	Detroit, Michigan	WUDL-LD	19.6	beIN Sports Xtra	Outlaw	See January 1 entry in subchannel launches	
January 1	Green Bay, Wisconsin	WBAY-TV	2.3	Circle (primary) / MyNetworkTV (secondary)	the365 (primary) / MyNetworkTV (secondary)	See January 1 entry in subchannel launches	
January 1	Greenville, South Carolina	WHNS	21.6	Circle	the365	See January 1 entry in subchannel launches	
January 1	Kansas City, Missouri	KCTV	5.2	Circle	the365	See January 1 entry in subchannel launches	
January 1	Kansas City, Missouri	KCTV	5.5	Shop LC	Outlaw	See January 1 entry in subchannel launches	
January 1	Lansing, Michigan	WILX-TV	10.3	Circle	Heroes & Icons	See January 1 entry in subchannel launches	
January 1	Lansing, Michigan	WILX-TV	10.5	Antenna TV	the365	See January 1 entry in subchannel launches	
January 1	Lansing, Michigan	WILX-TV	10.7	Heroes & Icons	Outlaw	See January 1 entry in subchannel launches	
January 1	Los Angeles, California	KSKJ-CD	45.2	beIN Sports Xtra en Español	the365	See January 1 entry in subchannel launches	
January 1	Los Angeles, California	KSKJ-CD	45.7	Novelisima	Outlaw	See January 1 entry in subchannel launches	
January 1	Mankato, Minnesota	KMNF-LD	7.3	Circle	the365	See January 1 entry in subchannel launches	
January 1	Memphis, Tennessee	WMC-TV	5.3	Circle (primary) / The CW Sports (secondary)	the365 (primary) / The CW Sports (secondary)	See January 1 entry in subchannel launches	
January 1	New York City	WRNN-TV	48.2	Shop LC	Charge!	See January 1 entry in subchannel launches	
January 1	New York City	WRNN-TV	48.3	Charge!	the365	See January 1 entry in subchannel launches	
January 1	New York City	WRNN-TV	48.4	QVC2	Outlaw	See January 1 entry in subchannel launches	
January 1	Philadelphia, Pennsylvania	WMCN-TV	44.2	Shop LC	the365	See January 1 entry in subchannel launches	
January 1	Philadelphia, Pennsylvania	WMCN-TV	44.3	QVC2	Outlaw	See January 1 entry in subchannel launches	
January 1	Rockford, Illinois	WIFR-LD	23.3	Circle	Outlaw	See January 1 entry in subchannel launches	
January 1	Sacramento, California	KBTV-CD	8.4	Timeless TV	the365	See January 1 entry in subchannel launches	
January 1	Sacramento, California	KBTV-CD	8.7	OnTV4U	Outlaw	See January 1 entry in subchannel launches	
January 1	Sacramento, California	KAHC-LD	43.5	RVTV	the365	See January 1 entry in subchannel launches	
January 1	Sacramento, California	KAHC-LD	43.7	Magnificent Movies Network	Outlaw	See January 1 entry in subchannel launches	
January 1	Sacramento, California	KFMS-LD	47.4	RVTV	the365	See January 1 entry in subchannel launches	
January 1	Sacramento, California	KFMS-LD	47.7	Binge TV	Outlaw	See January 1 entry in subchannel launches	
January 1	San Diego, California	KSKT-CD	43.7	Novelisima	the365	See January 1 entry in subchannel launches	
January 1	San Francisco, California	KQRO-LD	45.5	Binge TV	the365	See January 1 entry in subchannel launches	
January 1	San Francisco, California	KQRO-LD	45.6	Timeless TV	Outlaw	See January 1 entry in subchannel launches	
January 1	Sarasota–Tampa–St. Petersburg, Florida	WWSB	40.2	Circle	the365	See January 1 entry in subchannel launches	
January 1	Savannah, Georgia	WTOC-TV	11.3	Circle	the365	See January 1 entry in subchannel launches	
January 1	Seattle–Tacoma, Washington	KOMO-TV	4.2	Comet (primary) / The CW (secondary)	Comet (full-time)	See January 1 entry in stations changing network affiliations	
January 1	Sherman, Texas	KXII	12.6	Circle	Outlaw	See January 1 entry in subchannel launches	
January 1	Sioux City, Iowa	KTIV	4.6	Circle	Outlaw	See January 1 entry in subchannel launches	
January 1	Grand Rapids, Michigan	WWMT	3.2	The CW	Independent	On December 18, 2023, Nexstar announced that WOTV, KELO-TV and WMBB will become CW affiliates via their digital subchannels on January 1, 2024.	
January 1	Grand Rapids, Michigan	WOTV	41.2	Dabl	The CW	On December 18, 2023, Nexstar announced that WOTV, KELO-TV and WMBB will become CW affiliates via their digital subchannels on January 1, 2024.	
January 1	Sioux Falls, South Dakota	KELO-TV	11.4	Ion Mystery	The CW Plus	On December 18, 2023, Nexstar announced that WOTV, KELO-TV and WMBB will become CW affiliates via their digital subchannels on January 1, 2024.	
January 1	Sioux Falls, South Dakota	KSFY-TV	13.2	The CW Plus	Outlaw	On December 18, 2023, Nexstar announced that WOTV, KELO-TV and WMBB will become CW affiliates via their digital subchannels on January 1, 2024.	
January 1	Sioux Falls, South Dakota	KDLT-TV	46.3	Antenna TV	the365	On December 18, 2023, Nexstar announced that WOTV, KELO-TV and WMBB will become CW affiliates via their digital subchannels on January 1, 2024.	
January 1	Panama City, Florida	WJHG-TV	7.2	The CW Plus	MeTV	On December 18, 2023, Nexstar announced that WOTV, KELO-TV and WMBB will become CW affiliates via their digital subchannels on January 1, 2024.	
January 1	Panama City, Florida	WJHG-TV	7.6	Circle	the365	On December 18, 2023, Nexstar announced that WOTV, KELO-TV and WMBB will become CW affiliates via their digital subchannels on January 1, 2024.	
January 1	Panama City, Florida	WMBB	13.2	Antenna TV	The CW Plus	On December 18, 2023, Nexstar announced that WOTV, KELO-TV and WMBB will become CW affiliates via their digital subchannels on January 1, 2024.	
January 31	Sacramento–Stockton–Modesto, California	KMAX-TV	31.3	Comet	QVC		
January 31	Sacramento–Stockton–Modesto, California	KMAX-TV	31.4	Charge!	QVC2		
February 1	Phoenix, Arizona	KNXV-TV	15.2	Antenna TV (primary) / The CW (secondary)	Antenna TV (full-time)	See February 1 entry in stations changing network affiliations	
February 2	Tupelo–Columbus–West Point, Mississippi	WCBI-TV	4.2	MyNetworkTV	Fox	See February 2 entry in stations changing network affiliations	
February 2	Tupelo–Columbus–West Point, Mississippi	WCBI-TV	4.3	The CW+	MyNetworkTV	See February 2 entry in stations changing network affiliations	
February 5	Topeka, Kansas	KTKA-TV	49.2	Dabl	Rewind TV		
February 21	Sacramento–Stockton–Modesto, California	KXTV	10.6	Quest	The Nest	Quest switched to subchannel 10.5 in December 2023 when Twist ceased operations, leaving the subchannel dark for over 1 1/2 months.	
February 21	Sacramento–Stockton–Modesto, California	KAHC-LD	43.2	Timeless TV	GoldenTV		
April 1	Chicago, Illinois	WBBM-TV	2.5	Charge!	Comet		
April 1	Chicago, Illinois	WLS-TV	7.3	This TV	Charge!		
April 1	Durham–Raleigh, North Carolina	WTVD	11.3	This TV	Charge!		
April 1	Fresno, California	KFSN-TV	30.3	This TV	Charge!		
April 1	Houston, Texas	KTRK-TV	13.3	This TV	Charge!		
April 1	Los Angeles, California	KABC-TV	7.3	This TV	Charge!		
April 1	Los Angeles, California	KCAL-TV	9.3	Charge!	Comet		
April 1	New York City	WABC-TV	7.3	This TV	Charge!		
April 1	New York City	WJLP	33.6	TBD	The Nest		
April 1	New York City	WRNN-TV	48.2	Charge!	TBD		
April 1	New York City	WMBC-TV	63.2	Independent	Scripps News		
April 1	Philadelphia, Pennsylvania	WPVI-TV	6.3	This TV	Charge!		
April 1	Phoenix, Arizona	KAZT-TV	7.5	Independent	Rewind TV		
April 1	San Angelo, Texas	KSAN-TV	3.2	Bounce TV	Laff		
April 1	San Angelo, Texas	KSAN-TV	3.3	Laff	Bounce TV		
April 1	San Francisco, California	KGO-TV	7.3	This TV	Charge!		
April 2	Albuquerque, New Mexico	KNAT-TV	23.2	TBN Inspire	Merit Street	See Merit Street entry in launches	
April 2	Albuquerque, New Mexico	KNAT-TV	23.3	Smile	TBN Inspire	See Merit Street entry in launches	
April 2	Albuquerque, New Mexico	KNAT-TV	23.4	Enlace	Smile	See Merit Street entry in launches	
April 2	Altoona–Johnstown–State College, Pennsylvania	WATM-TV	23.4	This TV	Merit Street	See Merit Street entry in launches	
April 2	Atlanta, Georgia	WHSG-TV	63.2	TBN Inspire	Merit Street	See Merit Street entry in launches	
April 2	Atlanta, Georgia	WHSG-TV	63.3	Smile	TBN Inspire	See Merit Street entry in launches	
April 2	Atlanta, Georgia	WHSG-TV	63.4	Enlace	Smile	See Merit Street entry in launches	
April 2	Bartlesville–Tulsa, Oklahoma	KDOR-TV	17.2	TBN Inspire	Merit Street	See Merit Street entry in launches	
April 2	Bartlesville–Tulsa, Oklahoma	KDOR-TV	17.3	Smile	TBN Inspire	See Merit Street entry in launches	
April 2	Bartlesville–Tulsa, Oklahoma	KDOR-TV	17.4	Enlace	Smile	See Merit Street entry in launches	
April 2	Birmingham, Alabama	WTJP-TV	60.2	TBN Inspire	Merit Street	See Merit Street entry in launches	
April 2	Birmingham, Alabama	WTJP-TV	60.3	Smile	TBN Inspire	See Merit Street entry in launches	
April 2	Birmingham, Alabama	WTJP-TV	60.4	Enlace	Smile	See Merit Street entry in launches	
April 2	Bloomington–Normal–Peoria, Illinois	WYZZ-TV	43.2	This TV	Merit Street	See Merit Street entry in launches	
April 2	Chattanooga, Tennessee	WELF-TV	23.2	TBN Inspire	Merit Street	See Merit Street entry in launches	
April 2	Chattanooga, Tennessee	WELF-TV	23.3	Smile	TBN Inspire	See Merit Street entry in launches	
April 2	Chattanooga, Tennessee	WELF-TV	23.4	Enlace	Smile	See Merit Street entry in launches	
April 2	Chicago, Illinois	WWTO-TV	35.2	Smile	Merit Street	See Merit Street entry in launches	
April 2	Chicago, Illinois	WWTO-TV	35.3	Enlace	Smile	See Merit Street entry in launches	
April 2	Cocoa–Orlando, Florida	WHLV-TV	52.2	TBN Inspire	Merit Street	See Merit Street entry in launches	
April 2	Cocoa–Orlando, Florida	WHLV-TV	52.3	Smile	TBN Inspire	See Merit Street entry in launches	
April 2	Cocoa–Orlando, Florida	WHLV-TV	52.4	Enlace	Smile	See Merit Street entry in launches	
April 2	Dallas–Fort Worth, Texas	KDTX-TV	58.2	TBN Inspire	Merit Street	See Merit Street entry in launches	
April 2	Dallas–Fort Worth, Texas	KDTX-TV	58.3	Smile	TBN Inspire	See Merit Street entry in launches	
April 2	Dallas–Fort Worth, Texas	KDTX-TV	58.4	Enlace	Smile	See Merit Street entry in launches	
April 2	Davenport, Iowa	WMWC-TV	53.2	TBN Inspire	Merit Street	See Merit Street entry in launches	
April 2	Davenport, Iowa	WMWC-TV	53.3	Smile	TBN Inspire	See Merit Street entry in launches	
April 2	Davenport, Iowa	WMWC-TV	53.4	Enlace	Smile	See Merit Street entry in launches	
April 2	Denver, Colorado	KPJR-TV	38.2	TBN Inspire	Merit Street	See Merit Street entry in launches	
April 2	Denver, Colorado	KPJR-TV	38.3	Smile	TBN Inspire	See Merit Street entry in launches	
April 2	Denver, Colorado	KPJR-TV	38.4	Enlace	Smile	See Merit Street entry in launches	
April 2	Hendersonville–Nashville, Tennessee	WPGD-TV	50.2	TBN Inspire	Merit Street	See Merit Street entry in launches	
April 2	Hendersonville–Nashville, Tennessee	WPGD-TV	50.3	Smile	TBN Inspire	See Merit Street entry in launches	
April 2	Hendersonville–Nashville, Tennessee	WPGD-TV	50.4	Enlace	Smile	See Merit Street entry in launches	
April 2	Holly Springs, Mississippi–Memphis, Tennessee	WBUY-TV	40.2	TBN Inspire	Merit Street	See Merit Street entry in launches	
April 2	Holly Springs, Mississippi–Memphis, Tennessee	WBUY-TV	40.3	Smile	TBN Inspire	See Merit Street entry in launches	
April 2	Holly Springs, Mississippi–Memphis, Tennessee	WBUY-TV	40.4	Enlace	Smile	See Merit Street entry in launches	
April 2	Honolulu, Hawaii	KAAH-TV	26.2	TBN Inspire	Merit Street	See Merit Street entry in launches	
April 2	Honolulu, Hawaii	KAAH-TV	26.3	Smile	TBN Inspire	See Merit Street entry in launches	
April 2	Honolulu, Hawaii	KAAH-TV	26.4	Enlace	Smile	See Merit Street entry in launches	
April 2	Jackson, Mississippi	WRBJ-TV	34.2	TBN Inspire	Merit Street	See Merit Street entry in launches	
April 2	Jackson, Mississippi	WRBJ-TV	34.3	Smile	TBN Inspire	See Merit Street entry in launches	
April 2	Jackson, Mississippi	WRBJ-TV	34.4	Enlace	Smile	See Merit Street entry in launches	
April 2	Jersey City, New Jersey–New York, New York	WTBY-TV	54.2	Smile	Merit Street	See Merit Street entry in launches	
April 2	Jersey City, New Jersey–New York, New York	WTBY-TV	54.3	Enlace	Smile	See Merit Street entry in launches	
April 2	Kansas City–St. Joseph, Missouri	KTAJ-TV	16.2	TBN Inspire	Merit Street	See Merit Street entry in launches	
April 2	Kansas City–St. Joseph, Missouri	KTAJ-TV	16.3	Smile	TBN Inspire	See Merit Street entry in launches	
April 2	Kansas City–St. Joseph, Missouri	KTAJ-TV	16.4	Enlace	Smile	See Merit Street entry in launches	
April 2	Los Angeles, California	KTBN-TV	40.2	TBN Inspire	Merit Street	See Merit Street entry in launches	
April 2	Los Angeles, California	KTBN-TV	40.3	Smile	TBN Inspire	See Merit Street entry in launches	
April 2	Los Angeles, California	KTBN-TV	40.4	Enlace	Smile	See Merit Street entry in launches	
April 2	Mayville–Milwaukee, Wisconsin	WWRS-TV	52.2	TBN Inspire	Merit Street	See Merit Street entry in launches	
April 2	Mayville–Milwaukee, Wisconsin	WWRS-TV	52.3	Smile	TBN Inspire	See Merit Street entry in launches	
April 2	Mayville–Milwaukee, Wisconsin	WWRS-TV	52.4	Enlace	Smile	See Merit Street entry in launches	
April 2	Miami, Florida	WHFT-TV	45.2	TBN Inspire	Merit Street	See Merit Street entry in launches	
April 2	Miami, Florida	WHFT-TV	45.3	Smile	TBN Inspire	See Merit Street entry in launches	
April 2	Miami, Florida	WHFT-TV	45.4	Enlace	Smile	See Merit Street entry in launches	
April 2	Millville, New Jersey–Philadelphia, Pennsylvania	WGTW-TV	48.2	TBN Inspire	Merit Street	See Merit Street entry in launches	
April 2	Millville, New Jersey–Philadelphia, Pennsylvania	WGTW-TV	48.3	Smile	TBN Inspire	See Merit Street entry in launches	
April 2	Millville, New Jersey–Philadelphia, Pennsylvania	WGTW-TV	48.4	Enlace	Smile	See Merit Street entry in launches	
April 2	Mobile, Alabama–Pensacola, Florida	WMPV-TV	21.2	TBN Inspire	Merit Street	See Merit Street entry in launches	
April 2	Mobile, Alabama–Pensacola, Florida	WMPV-TV	21.3	Smile	TBN Inspire	See Merit Street entry in launches	
April 2	Mobile, Alabama–Pensacola, Florida	WMPV-TV	21.4	Enlace	Smile	See Merit Street entry in launches	
April 2	Montgomery, Alabama	WMCF-TV	45.2	TBN Inspire	Merit Street	See Merit Street entry in launches	
April 2	Montgomery, Alabama	WMCF-TV	45.3	Smile	TBN Inspire	See Merit Street entry in launches	
April 2	Montgomery, Alabama	WMCF-TV	45.4	Enlace	Smile	See Merit Street entry in launches	
April 2	Norfolk, Virginia	WTPC-TV	21.2	TBN Inspire	Merit Street	See Merit Street entry in launches	
April 2	Norfolk, Virginia	WTPC-TV	21.3	Smile	TBN Inspire	See Merit Street entry in launches	
April 2	Norfolk, Virginia	WTPC-TV	21.4	Enlace	Smile	See Merit Street entry in launches	
April 2	Oklahoma City, Oklahoma	KTBO-TV	14.2	TBN Inspire	Merit Street	See Merit Street entry in launches	
April 2	Oklahoma City, Oklahoma	KTBO-TV	14.3	Smile	TBN Inspire	See Merit Street entry in launches	
April 2	Oklahoma City, Oklahoma	KTBO-TV	14.4	Enlace	Smile	See Merit Street entry in launches	
April 2	Phoenix, Arizona	KPAZ-TV	21.2	TBN Inspire	Merit Street	See Merit Street entry in launches	
April 2	Phoenix, Arizona	KPAZ-TV	21.3	Smile	TBN Inspire	See Merit Street entry in launches	
April 2	Phoenix, Arizona	KPAZ-TV	21.4	Enlace	Smile	See Merit Street entry in launches	
April 2	Portland, Oregon	KNMT	24.2	TBN Inspire	Merit Street	See Merit Street entry in launches	
April 2	Portland, Oregon	KNMT	24.3	Smile	TBN Inspire	See Merit Street entry in launches	
April 2	Portland, Oregon	KNMT	24.4	Enlace	Smile	See Merit Street entry in launches	
April 2	Seattle, Washington	KTBW-TV	20.2	TBN Inspire	Merit Street	See Merit Street entry in launches	
April 2	Seattle, Washington	KTBW-TV	20.3	Smile	TBN Inspire	See Merit Street entry in launches	
April 2	Seattle, Washington	KTBW-TV	20.4	Enlace	Smile	See Merit Street entry in launches	
April 3	Fresno, California	KGPE-TV	47.3	TheGrio	Antenna TV		
April 20	Wichita, Kansas	KAGW-CD	26.2	Rewind TV	Merit Street		
April 20	Wichita, Kansas	KAGW-CD	26.3	AMGTV	Rewind TV		
May 1	Hartford, Connecticut	WCTX	59.2	Comet	Charge!		
May 1	Las Vegas, Nevada	KLAS-TV	8.2	Rewind TV	Antenna TV		
May 1	Las Vegas, Nevada	KLAS-TV	8.3	Get	Rewind TV		
May 2	Phoenix, Arizona	KMOH-TV	6.2	MeTV+	Heroes & Icons		
May 10	Palm Springs, California	KRET-CD	45.4	Heroes & Icons	Catchy Comedy		
May 10	Palm Springs, California	KRET-CD	45.5	Catchy Comedy	Antenna TV		
May 13	Sacramento, California	KFMS-LD	47.6	Novelisima	Outdoor America	Novelisima was dropped in March 2024. In the interim, informercials were aired until Outdoor America began airing.	
May 17	Belmont–Charlotte, North Carolina	WJZY	46.5	TheGrio	Shop LC		
May 31	Belton–Waco, Texas	KNCT	46.6	This TV	Weather radar		
May 31	Dallas–Fort Worth, Texas	KTXA	21.3	This TV	Weather radar		
May 31	Davenport, Iowa	KLJB	18.3	Rewind TV	HSN		
May 31	Davenport, Iowa	KGCW	26.2	This TV	Rewind TV		
May 31	Huntsville, Alabama	WAAY-TV	31.6	This TV	TheGrio		
May 31	Phoenix, Arizona	KTVK	3.4	This TV	Infomercials		
June 13	Eugene, Oregon	KHWB-LD	38.2	Cornerstone Television	Antenna TV		
June 25	Fresno, California	KGMC	43.5	Antenna TV	MeTV Toons	See MeTV Toons entry in launches	
June 25	Honolulu, Hawaii	KIKU	20.2	Infomercials	MeTV Toons	See MeTV Toons entry in launches	
June 25	Houston, Texas	KPRC-TV	2.5	Get TV	MeTV Toons	See MeTV Toons entry in launches	
June 25	Lake Dallas, Texas	KAZD	55.3	MeTV+	MeTV Toons	See MeTV Toons entry in launches	
June 25	Louisville, Kentucky	WBNA	21.7	Ion Mystery	MeTV Toons	See MeTV Toons entry in launches	
June 25	Lubbock, Texas	KMYL-LD	14.5	Jewelry Television	MeTV Toons	See MeTV Toons entry in launches	
June 25	Macon, Georgia	WPGA-TV	58.5	Grit	MeTV Toons	See MeTV Toons entry in launches	
June 25	Middletown Township, New Jersey–New York, New York	WJLP	33.2	Grit	MeTV Toons	See MeTV Toons entry in launches	
June 25	Milwaukee, Wisconsin	WMLW-TV	49.5	MeTV+	MeTV Toons	See MeTV Toons entry in launches	
June 25	Monterey, California	KMBY-LD	27.5	SonLife	MeTV Toons	See MeTV Toons entry in launches	
June 25	Myrtle Beach, South Carolina	WFXB	43.9	Weather radar	MeTV Toons	See MeTV Toons entry in launches	
June 25	St. Louis, Missouri	KNLC	24.2	NLEC TV	MeTV Toons	See MeTV Toons entry in launches	
June 25	Tulsa, Oklahoma	KMYT-TV	41.5	This TV	MeTV Toons	See MeTV Toons entry in launches	
June 27	Sacramento–Stockton–Modesto, California	KXTV	10.7	HSN	Confess by Nosey	HSN was dropped in June 2023, leaving the subchannel dark for a year	
July 1	Phoenix, Arizona	KPHE-LD	44.3	Rewind TV	Defy		
July 1	Sacramento, California	KBTV-CD	8.5	Law&Crime	Defy		
July 1	Sacramento, California	KAHC-LD	43.4	Shop LC	Defy		
July 1	Sacramento, California	KFMS-LD	47.2	OnTV4U	Shop LC		
July 1	Sacramento, California	KFMS-LD	47.3	Timeless TV	Defy		
September 1	Corpus Christi, Texas	KRIS-TV	6.2	The CW Plus	Laff	On April 19, 2024, The Desk reported that the E. W. Scripps Company was planning to drop its CW affiliations from seven stations. These stations will become independent, with a focus on expanded local news and sports coverage. Twelve days later, Nexstar announced that WGN-TV would become a CW affiliate once again as well as WVBT and KLFY-TV adding the network to their digital subchannels. On August 22, 2024, Nexstar Media Group has announced five new affiliates for its CW Network, and all of them are owned by the company.	
September 1	Corpus Christi, Texas	KORO	28.3	Laff	Ion Plus		
September 1	Corpus Christi, Texas	KSCC	38.3	MyNetworkTV (retained as secondary)	The CW Plus (primary)		
September 1	Norfolk, Virginia	WVBT	43.2	Cozi TV	The CW		
September 1	Utica, New York	WKTV	2.3	The CW Plus	Independent		
September 1	Utica, New York	WFXV	33.2	Ion Mystery	The CW Plus		
September 1	Terre Haute, Indiana	WTWO	2.2	Laff	The CW Plus		
September 1	Terre Haute, Indiana	WTWO	2.3	Ion Mystery	Laff		
September 1	Terre Haute, Indiana	WTHI-TV	10.3	The CW Plus	MeTV		
September 1	Roanoke, Virginia	WFXR	27.4	Quest	Antenna TV		
September 1	San Luis Obispo–Santa Maria–Santa Barbara, California	KSBY	6.2	The CW Plus	Laff		
September 1	San Luis Obispo–Santa Maria–Santa Barbara, California	KCOY-TV	12.3	Laff	The CW Plus		
September 1	San Luis Obispo–Santa Maria–Santa Barbara, California	KPMR	38.5	Laff	Grit		
September 1	Tucson, Arizona	KTTU-TV	18.2	The Nest	MyNetworkTV		
September 1	Tucson, Arizona	KTTU-TV	18.3	Heroes & Icons	The Nest		
September 1	Tucson, Arizona	KTTU-TV	18.7	Quest	Confess by Nosey		
September 1	Wichita Falls, Texas–Lawton, Oklahoma	KAUZ-TV	6.2	The CW Plus	Independent		
September 1	Wichita Falls, Texas–Lawton, Oklahoma	KFDX-TV	3.3	Laff	The CW Plus		
September 7	Phoenix, Arizona	KAZT-TV	7.3	HSN	Merit Street		
September 20	Wichita, Kansas	KAGW-CD	26.2	Merit Street	AWE Plus		
September 20	Wichita, Kansas	KAGW-CD	26.3	Rewind TV	All Sports TV Network		
September 20	Wichita, Kansas	KAGW-CD	26.4	Timeless TV	Quest		
September 20	Wichita, Kansas	KAGW-CD	26.7	Ace TV	Newsmax 2		
September 20	Wichita, Kansas	KAGW-CD	26.8	Quest	One America News Network		
September 20	Wichita, Kansas	KAGW-CD	26.9	Newsmax 2	America's Voice		
September 20	Wichita, Kansas	KAGW-CD	26.10	One America News Network	WeatherNation TV		
September 23	Lafayette, Louisiana	KATC-TV	3.2	The CW Plus	Laff		
September 23	Lafayette, Louisiana	KLFY-TV	10.2	Dabl	The CW Plus		
September 23	Lafayette, Louisiana	KLFY-TV	10.4	Laff	Ion Mystery		
October 1	Monroe, Louisiana	KNOE-TV	8.3	The CW Plus (primary) / MyNetworkTV (secondary)	Gulf Coast SEN		
October 1	Monroe, Louisiana	KARD	14.2	Bounce TV	The CW Plus		
October 1	Augusta, Georgia	WJBF	6.3	Ion Television	The CW Plus		
October 1	Augusta, Georgia	WRDW-TV	12.2	NBC (via WAGT-CD)	MyNetworkTV		
October 1	Augusta, Georgia	WRDW-TV	12.3	MyNetworkTV	Peachtree Sports Network		
October 1	Augusta, Georgia	WAGT-CD	26.2	The CW Plus	Peachtree Sports Network		
October 1	Chicago–Hammond, Indiana	WJYS	62.2	Jewelry TV	Chicago Sports Network	On September 15, 2024, Chicago Sports Network, the new home of the Chicago Blackhawks, the Chicago Bulls, and the Chicago White Sox, announced it would be available over-the-air in Chicago beginning on October 1.	
October 1	Chicago–Hammond, Indiana	WJYS	62.3	QVC	Chicago Sports Network	On September 15, 2024, Chicago Sports Network, the new home of the Chicago Blackhawks, the Chicago Bulls, and the Chicago White Sox, announced it would be available over-the-air in Chicago beginning on October 1.	
October 1	Rockford, Illinois	WSLN	19.3	Antenna TV	Chicago Sports Network	On September 15, 2024, Chicago Sports Network, the new home of the Chicago Blackhawks, the Chicago Bulls, and the Chicago White Sox, announced it would be available over-the-air in Chicago beginning on October 1.	
October 1	South Bend, Indiana	WNDU-TV	16.2	Antenna TV	Chicago Sports Network	On September 15, 2024, Chicago Sports Network, the new home of the Chicago Blackhawks, the Chicago Bulls, and the Chicago White Sox, announced it would be available over-the-air in Chicago beginning on October 1.	
October 1	South Bend, Indiana	WNDU-TV	16.3	The365	Antenna TV	On September 15, 2024, Chicago Sports Network, the new home of the Chicago Blackhawks, the Chicago Bulls, and the Chicago White Sox, announced it would be available over-the-air in Chicago beginning on October 1.	
October 1	South Bend, Indiana	WNDU-TV	16.4	Outlaw	Chicago Sports Network Plus	On September 15, 2024, Chicago Sports Network, the new home of the Chicago Blackhawks, the Chicago Bulls, and the Chicago White Sox, announced it would be available over-the-air in Chicago beginning on October 1.	
October 4	Davenport, Iowa	KLJB	18.3	HSN	Defy		
November 1	Indianapolis, Indiana	WXIN	59.3	Rewind TV	Defy		
November 1	Salt Lake City, Utah	KTVX	4.4	The Nest	Outlaw		
November 4	Houston, Texas	KIAH	39.5	Court TV	Rewind TV		
November 16	Ann Arbor–Detroit, Michigan	WPXD-TV	31.5	Scripps News	Laff	See Scripps News entry in Closures	
November 16	Appleton–Green Bay, Wisconsin	WACY-TV	32.5	Scripps News	Ion Television	See Scripps News entry in Closures	
November 16	Atlanta, Georgia	WSB-TV	2.5	Scripps News	Ion Television	See Scripps News entry in Closures	
November 16	Atlanta, Georgia (Rome)	WPXA-TV	14.6	Scripps News	Grit	See Scripps News entry in Closures	
November 16	Austin–Rochester, Minnesota	KAAL	6.5	Scripps News	Ion Television	See Scripps News entry in Closures	
November 16	Bakersfield, California	KERO-TV	23.6	Scripps News	Ion Plus	See Scripps News entry in Closures	
November 16	Baltimore, Maryland	WMAR-TV	2.7	Scripps News	Laff	See Scripps News entry in Closures	
November 16	Battle Creek–Grand Rapids, Michigan	WZPX-TV	43.6	Scripps News	Ion Plus	See Scripps News entry in Closures	
November 16	Bellevue–Seattle–Tacoma, Washington	KWPX-TV	33.6	Scripps News	Ion Mystery	See Scripps News entry in Closures	
November 16	Billings, Montana	KTVQ	2.5	Scripps News	Ion Television	See Scripps News entry in Closures	
November 16	Boston, Massachusetts	WPXG-TV	21.3	Scripps News	Laff	See Scripps News entry in Closures	
November 16	Boston, Massachusetts	WBPX-TV	68.3	Scripps News	Laff	See Scripps News entry in Closures	
November 16	Bozeman, Montana	KBZK	7.6	Scripps News	Laff	See Scripps News entry in Closures	
November 16	Bradenton–Tampa, Florida	WXPX-TV	66.6	Scripps News	Ion Mystery	See Scripps News entry in Closures	
November 16	Buffalo, New York	WPXJ-TV	51.6	Scripps News	Ion Mystery	See Scripps News entry in Closures	
November 16	Butte, Montana	KXLF-TV	4.6	Scripps News	Laff	See Scripps News entry in Closures	
November 16	Cedar Rapids, Iowa	KPXR-TV	48.6	Scripps News	Ion Mystery	See Scripps News entry in Closures	
November 16	Cincinnati, Ohio	WCPO-TV	9.6	Scripps News	Ion Plus	See Scripps News entry in Closures	
November 16	Chattanooga, Tennessee	WRCB	3.5	Scripps News	Grit	See Scripps News entry in Closures	
November 16	Conroe–Houston, Texas	KPXB-TV	49.5	Scripps News	Ion Mystery	See Scripps News entry in Closures	
November 16	Corpus Christi, Texas	KRIS-TV	6.6	Scripps News	Ion Mystery	See Scripps News entry in Closures	
November 16	Decatur–Springfield–Champaign–Urbana, Illinois	WAND	17.5	Scripps News	Court TV	See Scripps News entry in Closures	
November 16	Denver, Colorado	KPXC-TV	59.5	Scripps News	Laff	See Scripps News entry in Closures	
November 16	Duluth, Minnesota	WDIO-DT	10.6	Scripps News	Ion Mystery	See Scripps News entry in Closures	
November 16	El Paso, Texas	KVIA-TV	7.5	Scripps News	Laff	See Scripps News entry in Closures	
November 16	Franklin–Nashville, Tennessee	WNPX-TV	28.6	Scripps News	Ion Mystery	See Scripps News entry in Closures	
November 16	Greenville, North Carolina	WPXU-TV	35.6	Scripps News	Ion Mystery	See Scripps News entry in Closures	
November 16	Greenville, North Carolina	WEPX-TV	38.3	Scripps News	Ion Mystery	See Scripps News entry in Closures	
November 16	Greenville, South Carolina	WGGS-TV	16.2	Scripps News	Outlaw	See Scripps News entry in Closures	
November 16	Hartford, Connecticut (New London)	WHPX-TV	26.5	Scripps News	Grit	See Scripps News entry in Closures	
November 16	Helena, Montana	KXLH-LD	9.5	Scripps News	Ion Plus	See Scripps News entry in Closures	
November 16	Honolulu, Hawaii	KPXO-TV	66.5	Scripps News	Grit	See Scripps News entry in Closures	
November 16	Hoover–Birmingham, Alabama	WPXH-TV	44.5	Scripps News	Ion Mystery	See Scripps News entry in Closures	
November 16	Janesville–Madison, Wisconsin	WIFS	57.7	Scripps News	Court TV	See Scripps News entry in Closures	
November 16	Jellico–Knoxville, Tennessee	WPXK-TV	54.5	Scripps News	Ion Plus	See Scripps News entry in Closures	
November 16	Kenosha–Milwaukee, Wisconsin	WPXE-TV	55.6	Scripps News	Laff	See Scripps News entry in Closures	
November 16	Lake Charles, Louisiana	KSWL-LD	17.5	Scripps News	Ion Mystery	See Scripps News entry in Closures	
November 16	Lansing, Michigan	WSYM-TV	47.7	Scripps News	Laff	See Scripps News entry in Closures	
November 16	Laughlin–Las Vegas, Nevada	KMCC	34.4	Scripps News	Grit	See Scripps News entry in Closures	
November 16	Lewiston–Portland, Maine	WIPL	35.6	Scripps News	Ion Mystery	See Scripps News entry in Closures	
November 16	Little Rock, Arkansas	KTHV	11.7	Scripps News	Ion Television	See Scripps News entry in Closures	
November 16	Louisville, Kentucky	WDRB	41.4	Scripps News	Court TV	See Scripps News entry in Closures	
November 16	Manassas, Virginia–Washington, D.C.	WPXW-TV	66.6	Scripps News	Ion Mystery	See Scripps News entry in Closures	
November 16	Melbourne–Orlando, Florida	WOPX-TV	56.5	Scripps News	Laff	See Scripps News entry in Closures	
November 16	Miami, Florida	WPXM-TV	35.5	Scripps News	Ion Plus	See Scripps News entry in Closures	
November 16	Minneapolis–Saint Paul, Minnesota	KPXM-TV	41.6	Scripps News	Court TV	See Scripps News entry in Closures	
November 16	Moline–Rock Island, Illinois; Davenport–Bettendorf, Iowa	WQAD-TV	8.7	Scripps News	Ion Television	See Scripps News entry in Closures	
November 16	Montgomery, Alabama (Tuskegee)	WBMM	22.6	Scripps News	Newsmax 2	See Scripps News entry in Closures	
November 16	New Orleans, Louisiana	WPXL-TV	49.4	Scripps News	Ion Plus	See Scripps News entry in Closures	
November 16	New York City	WMBC-TV	63.2	Scripps News	Ion Mystery	See Scripps News entry in Closures	
November 16	Newport–Providence, Rhode Island	WPXQ-TV	69.3	Scripps News	Ion Plus	See Scripps News entry in Closures	
November 16	Norfolk, Virginia	WPXV-TV	49.2	Scripps News	Laff	See Scripps News entry in Closures	
November 16	Norfolk, Virginia	WPXV-TV	49.5	Laff	Grit	See Scripps News entry in Closures	
November 16	Oklahoma City, Oklahoma	KOPX-TV	62.5	Scripps News	Ion Plus	See Scripps News entry in Closures	
November 16	Phoenix, Arizona	KPPX-TV	51.4	Scripps News	Laff	See Scripps News entry in Closures	
November 16	Pittsburgh, Pennsylvania	WINP-TV	16.5	Scripps News	Court TV	See Scripps News entry in Closures	
November 16	Provo–Salt Lake City, Utah	KUPX-TV	16.6	Scripps News	Ion Mystery	See Scripps News entry in Closures	
November 16	Pueblo–Colorado Springs, Colorado	KOAA-TV	5.5	Scripps News	Ion Television	See Scripps News entry in Closures	
November 16	Reno, Nevada	KTVN	2.2	Scripps News	Ion Mystery	See Scripps News entry in Closures	
November 16	Richmond, Virginia	WTVR-TV	6.6	Scripps News	Ion Plus	See Scripps News entry in Closures	
November 16	Sacramento–Stockton–Modesto, California	KSPX-TV	29.6	Scripps News	Grit	See Scripps News entry in Closures	
November 16	San Jose–San Francisco–Oakland, California	KKPX-TV	65.6	Scripps News	Grit	See Scripps News entry in Closures	
November 16	San Luis Obispo–Santa Maria–Santa Barbara, California	KSBY	6.5	Scripps News	Ion Mystery	See Scripps News entry in Closures	
November 16	Stuart–West Palm Beach, Florida	WHDT	9.3	Scripps News	Grit	See Scripps News entry in Closures	
November 16	Tallahassee, Florida	WTXL-TV	27.6	Scripps News	Laff	See Scripps News entry in Closures	
November 16	Toledo, Ohio	WUPW	36.6	Scripps News	Start TV	See Scripps News entry in Closures	
November 16	Tucson, Arizona	KGUN-TV	9.6	Scripps News	Ion Mystery	See Scripps News entry in Closures	
November 16	Tulsa, Oklahoma	KJRH-TV	2.6	Scripps News	Ion Television	See Scripps News entry in Closures	
November 16	Waco–Temple–Killeen, Texas	KXXV	25.5	Scripps News	Ion Plus	See Scripps News entry in Closures	
November 27	Scranton–Wilkes-Barre, Pennsylvania	WBRE-TV	28.4	True Crime Network	Defy		
December 1	Nashville, Tennessee	WKRN-TV	2.3	True Crime Network	Defy		
December 4	Sacramento, California	KBTV-CD	8.6	CRTV (Infomercials)	Fubo Sports		
December 4	Sacramento, California	KFMS-LD	47.6	Outdoor America	Fubo Sports		

== See also ==
- 2024 deaths in American television
- List of 2024 American television debuts
