= National Register of Historic Places listings in Tippah County, Mississippi =

Location of Tippah County in Mississippi

This is a list of the National Register of Historic Places listings in Tippah County, Mississippi.

This is intended to be a complete list of the properties and districts on the National Register of Historic Places in Tippah County, Mississippi, United States. Latitude and longitude coordinates are provided for many National Register properties and districts; these locations may be seen together in a map.

There are 3 properties and districts listed on the National Register in the county.

This National Park Service list is complete through NPS recent listings posted March 14, 2025.

== Current listings ==
	Name on the Register	Image	Date listed	Location	City or town	Description
1	Blue Mountain College Historic District	Blue Mountain College Historic District	May 23, 1979 (#79003383)	Mississippi Highway 15; 34°40′24″N 89°01′46″W	Blue Mountain	
2	Old US Post Office-Ripley	Old US Post Office-Ripley	September 8, 2000 (#00001056)	301 North Main Street; 34°43′54″N 88°56′58″W	Ripley	Constructed 1938, vacated as Post Office c. 2000
3	Ripley Historic District	Ripley Historic District	April 7, 2005 (#05000281)	Roughly bounded by North St., Siddall St., MS, and Middle St. 34°43′53″N 88°57′00″W	Ripley	

== See also ==
- List of National Historic Landmarks in Mississippi
- National Register of Historic Places listings in Mississippi
