= WCBI-TV =

Television station in Columbus, Mississippi

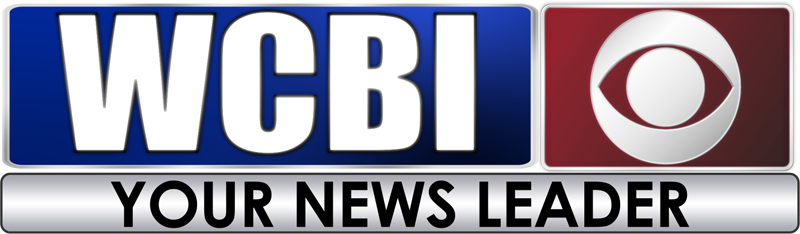
- Columbus–Tupelo–; West Point, Mississippi; United States
- City: Columbus, Mississippi
- Channels: Digital: 27 (UHF); Virtual: 4
- Branding: WCBI, WCBI News; Fox 4 (on DT2); My MS (on DT3)

Programming
- Affiliations: 4.1: CBS; 4.2: Fox; 4.3: Independent with MyNetworkTV; for others, see § Subchannels

Ownership
- Owner: Morris Multimedia; (WCBI-TV, LLC)
- Sister stations: WLOV-TV

History
- First air date: July 13, 1956
- Former channel numbers: Analog: 4 (VHF, 1956–2009); Digital: 35 (UHF, 2000–2018)
- Former affiliations: CBS (1956–1977); ABC (primary 1977–1979; secondary 1956–1977 and 1979–1983); NBC (secondary, 1956–1979); UPN (DT2, 2002–2006); MyNetworkTV (DT2, 2006–2024); CW+ (DT3, 2006–2024)
- Call sign meaning: Columbus, Birney Imes (station founder)

Technical information
- Licensing authority: FCC
- Facility ID: 12477
- ERP: 599 kW
- HAAT: 583.9 m (1,916 ft)
- Transmitter coordinates: 33°45′6″N 88°52′40″W

Links
- Public license information: Public file; LMS
- Website: www.wcbi.com

WCBI-TV (channel 4) is a television station licensed to Columbus, Mississippi, United States, serving the Columbus–Tupelo market as an affiliate of CBS, Fox, and MyNetworkTV. It is owned by Morris Multimedia and operated alongside West Point–licensed CW+ affiliate WLOV-TV (channel 27). The two stations share studios on 5th Street South in Downtown Columbus; WCBI-TV's transmitter is located in northwestern Clay County.

== History ==
When WCBI signed on-the-air July 13, 1956, it was the first television station in North Mississippi. The station was owned by Birney Imes, Jr., a Columbus businessman and publisher of the Commercial Dispatch newspaper. The station's call letters come from his initials. It had studios in a cement block building surrounded by a group of mobile homes in a pasture off MS 12 just east of Columbus. For the first 23 years of its history, WCBI carried programming from all three major networks—CBS, NBC and ABC. However, it has always been a primary CBS affiliate, except from 1977 to 1979 when it was a primary ABC affiliate; it returned to CBS in anticipation of Meridian station WTOK, which was carried on Columbus cable systems, joining ABC in early 1980. During the late-1950s, it was also briefly affiliated with the NTA Film Network.

NBC disappeared from the schedule in 1979 after WTVA (channel 9) in Tupelo expanded its city-grade signal to include Columbus. WCBI continued to carry some ABC programs until 1983 when WVSB (channel 27, now sister station WLOV-TV) began operations.

The station remained in its rural location for more than thirty years. In the early 1990s, Frank Imes (Birney's son) supervised the renovation of the former Egger's Department Store in downtown Columbus. Live broadcasting began at the new facility on October 25, 1993, with News 4 at 6.

WCBI began broadcasting a full-power digital signal in March 2000 on UHF channel 35. By early September 2002, it was broadcasting three digital signals including CBS in high definition on DT1. On DT2 was a standard definition UPN channel known on air as "UPN Mississippi" that was the first digital affiliate of the network in the country; the UPN affiliation was previously held by both WLOV and W22BS. A 24-hour local weather station was located on DT3 known on-air as "WCBI WeatherCheck" and provided as part of The Local AccuWeather Channel.

In November 2003, Imes Communications sold WCBI to current owner Morris Multimedia with the sale closing on January 14 of the next year. It was the last remaining station of Imes' once-sizable smaller-market broadcasting group. The Commercial Dispatch remains under Imes family ownership to this day.

On September 5, 2006, the UPN Mississippi subchannel was relaunched as "My Mississippi", affiliating with MyNetworkTV as part of the merger of UPN and The WB. Thirteen days later on September 18, the weather subchannel on DT3 was converted to a CW+ affiliate as "North Mississippi CW".

On February 1, 2024, it was announced that the Fox affiliation would move from WLOV to WCBI-DT2 the next day. WLOV would assume WCBI-DT3's CW Plus affiliation. The MyNetworkTV affiliation moved to digital subchannel 4.3 to replace its CW+ affiliation, and 4.2 was upgraded to Fox's recommended 720p format. Prior to 2024, the subchannel has been broadcast in 4:3 SD.

== News operation ==
On September 8, 2008, WCBI began producing the area's second prime time newscast on this station called WCBI News at 9 on My MS. It only airs on weeknights for thirty minutes and competes with another prime time show seen for a half-hour on Fox affiliate WLOV-TV (produced Sunday through Friday nights by NBC affiliate WTVA). At some point in time, WCBI added an hour-long extension of its weekday morning show to WCBI-DT2 titled WCBI News Sunrise on My MS, which airs from 7 until 8 and offers a local alternative to the national network morning shows. In addition to its main studios, the station operates a Tupelo Bureau on Main Street/US 278/MS 6/MS 178. On September 16, 2013, both newscasts airing on WCBI-DT2 moved to CW affiliate WCBI-DT3.

== Technical information ==
=== Subchannels ===
The station's signal is multiplexed:

Subchannels of WCBI-TV
Subchannel	Res.	Short name	Programming
4.1	1080i	CBS	CBS
4.2	720p	FOX	Fox
4.3	480i	MY-MS	Independent with MyNetworkTV

=== Analog-to-digital conversion ===
WCBI-TV shut down its analog signal, over VHF channel 4, on January 24, 2009, due to a transmitter problem. This was under a month before the original date of the federally-mandated transition from analog broadcasting to digital broadcasting (the original date was February 17; it would later get pushed back to June 12). The station's digital signal remained on its pre-transition UHF channel 35, using virtual channel 4.

== See also ==
- Channel 4 virtual TV stations in the United States
- Channel 27 digital TV stations in the United States
