= Adam Grace =

American actor, magician, and musician

Adam Keith Grace (born May 16, 1975) is an American actor, magician, and musician best known as a founding member of the rock/Americana band Truth & Salvage Co. He began his acting career in the 1995 Broadway show Busker Alley at the St. James Theater in New York City.

Grace's other film and television appearances include the 2003 film Shade, Union Jack on Channel 4, The Sharon Osbourne Show, the Court TV series Fake Out, The Takedown, as well as Last Call with Carson Daly, Jimmy Kimmel Live!, other films, commercials, and television shows.

Grace was also a professional magician and inventor of magic tricks. Currently Grace is the Founder of Conjuror Community, an online club for magicians and performers.

== Early years ==
Grace was born in Louisville, Kentucky and was raised in Tupelo, Mississippi by his mother, Maxine Grace, and father Keith Grace, a Baptist minister. Grace also started in magic at age 6, after being fooled by his father's "Kit Kat" trick. At age 7, his mother enrolled him in piano lessons. Grace spent his childhood studying music, magic and acting, performing in his first stage play at age 6.

By age twelve, Grace was performing magic shows publicly, with the help of his assistant, Kirk. His first public magic show was for a local cub scout group in Tupelo. In his early performance years, Adam would make many appearances on several local and regional Television shows like The Morning Show and The Noon Show. As a result of that exposure, Grace would go on to perform his magic show at corporate events and parties around the Tri-State area under the stage name Adam "Amazing" Grace.

Grace graduated Tupelo High School in 1993 where he found his love for theater and music. While a student there he performed in many musicals and plays and was encouraged to pursue a career as an actor by one of his high school teachers, Debby Gibbs, who also led the school's drama department. She also cast him in the lead role of Harold Hill in a production of The Music Man While in high school, Grace was also the 1993 DECA Mississippi state president.

After graduating from high school, Grace attended the American Musical and Dramatic Academy in New York City. While there he landed his first part in the Broadway show Busker Alley.

== Career ==
Grace was relatively unknown until he moved to Los Angeles, CA in 2001 and joined forces with musician Gary Jules as pianist and organist. That year, alongside Gary Jules, Grace would become a staple performer at the legendary "Tuesday's at the Hotel". This live musical series was responsible for founding the Hotel Cafe sound. Over the next few years, The Hotel Cafe would become one of LA's most legendary music venues, featuring performers like: Adele, The Lumineers, Chris Martin of Coldplay, John Mayer, Mumford and Sons, Ray Lamontagne, Damien Rice, Katy Perry, and many more.

During Grace's time with Gary Jules, they had a hit song "Mad World" which was released through Sanctuary Records on 15 December 2003, in time for the race for the UK's Christmas number one, beating "Christmas Time (Don't Let the Bells End)" by the Darkness to take the title the following week. "Mad World" was also used in 2005 as the soundtrack for the opening section of the Season 6 episode "Room Service" of CSI: Crime Scene Investigation. "Mad World" would go on to be featured in the film Donnie Darko and The Crazies as well as many television shows such as General Hospital, Without a Trace, The O.C., Smallville, Jericho, and many more. The music video for "Mad World" was directed by Michel Gondry.

Grace would go on to play piano on "BIRD", the first full-band release from Gary Jules and the Group Rules. The album is composed of songs written mostly during the now infamous GJGR "Tuesdays at the Hotel" residency at the Hotel Cafe in Hollywood CA.

In 2003, Grace appeared on the Channel 4 show Union Jack where he sawed Jack Osbourne in half. That same year Grace performed and appeared on The Sharon Osbourne Show performing magic for the Osbourne's Family Christmas.

In 2004, Grace was as a magic consultant for the television show Mondo Magic as well as the 2005 season of Criss Angel Mindfreak.

In 2005, Grace appeared on the Court TV television shows Fake Out and The Takedown as well as Dave Chappelle's Block Party, also known as Block Party.

In 2008, Grace made an appearance on the June 11th episode of Last Call with Carson Daly. In 2010, Grace appeared on Jimmy Kimmel Live! where Sharon Osbourne was coincidentally also a guest that evening.

Grace is a founding member of Truth & Salvage Co. On May 25, 2010, the band released its debut album, Truth & Salvage Co., on Silver Arrow/Megaforce Records. Produced by Chris Robinson, of the Black Crowes, it features 12 tracks (including the four previously released on their 2009 EP of the same name). The album gained early attention from such media outlets as USA Today and All Music Guide and set the stage for the band to embark on a summer tour across the United States. The 43-date run marked the band's first headlining tour of non-club venues and included performances at a number of high-profile summer festivals, including Bonnaroo, Beale Street Music Festival, Wakarusa, Stagecoach Festival, High Sierra Music Festival and Red Rocks.

The band's song "Them Jeans," a bonus track on the iTunes version of their debut, was subsequently selected by Gap Jeans to be featured on the fashion retailer's new iPad e-commerce application.

The band released their second record, Pick Me Up, on Megaforce/Sony RED on July 23, 2013. The record was co-produced by the band and Jon Ashley with Bill Reynolds handling the mix. Recorded as a "joyous tour de force" at Echo Mountain studio in Asheville, NC, the album features 12 original tracks and a cover of Joe South's Grammy-winning 1968 hit "Games People Play."

With his band, Grace has made appearances on CMT's Concrete Country, The Late Late Show with Craig Ferguson, and numerous radio and television shows. They would also tour extensively with The Avett Brothers.

In 2014, Grace teamed up with Sam Holt to form Remembering Mikey, a musical tribute to Widespread Panic's founding guitarist Michael Houser, who died of pancreatic cancer in 2002. They toured to raise money for cancer awareness.

In 2014, Grace also founded Conjuror.Community, an online club for magicians and performers. They claim to be "the world's best magic club" and provide resources for magicians to learn magic, grow new skills, book shows, and gain experience in the performing arts. Since 2014, Grace appeared in the weekly webisode, CC LIVE, produced by the Conjuror Community Network. Along with world-renowned card magician, Aaron Fisher, they founded the Conjuror Community Club.

In 2025, Grace appeared in a CNN news segment covering reported paranormal activity at the Lord Baltimore Hotel in Baltimore, Maryland. The feature included an interview with Grace discussing his experience during the Conjuror Community Summit held at the hotel earlier that year.
