= Robert Bruce Smith IV =

Robert Bruce Smith IV (June 14, 1945 – August 13, 2014) was an American music and history expert, writer, and lecturer. His expertise was sought after and beloved throughout Mississippi.

== Activities ==
Robert Bruce Smith IV was a Mississippi historian and native writer. Smith lived in Tupelo, Mississippi, where he was a history and technology consultant. He reviewed Tupelo Symphony Orchestra concerts for the Northeast Mississippi Daily Journal in addition to writing a local history column. He constantly researched topics about science, architecture, and Mississippi history for the purpose of presenting lecture topics to Mississippi historical groups, museums, and Universities.

== Early background ==
Smith spent his childhood in Ripley, Mississippi, graduated from high school in Tupelo, Mississippi, and received a bachelor's degree from the University of Mississippi. He previously served his country in the United States Air Force and then went on to pursue a career as a representative for the community concerts division of Columbia Artists Management in New York City for 19 years. Smith also worked as a computer specialist and systems manager of Kraft Foods, Inc.

== Historical writings and lectures ==
During 2004, Smith published a book, Madness and the Mississippi Bonds, about the famous Mississippi bond scandal. The scandal became a worldwide cause célèbre in the decades immediately preceding the Civil War.

For several years, he has led a walking tour of historic William Faulkner sites during Ripley, Mississippi's annual Faulkner Festival. Last summer, he led a similar tour of Ripley and New Albany for visiting scholars at the University of Mississippi's Faulkner-Yoknapatawpha Conference in Oxford, Mississippi.

Bruce's father (Robert Bruce Smith, III) was the special prosecutor appointed by Mississippi Governor J.P. Coleman in the Emmett Till case. Bruce, along with his brother Jak Smith (an attorney in Tupelo), retain their fathers papers from the Emmett Till trial.

== Historical presentations ==
Smith was an historian about aspects of Mississippi history, specializing in the life of William Faulkner and William Faulkner's grandfather, Col. William Clark Falkner. His ability to lecture extemporaneously upon topics related to Mississippi social life and family backgrounds is engaging to historical societies and museums.

Smith presented two history programs on William Johnson (the Barber of Natchez) on February 13, 2010, at the Natchez Trace Parkway Visitor Center near Tupelo, with a program entitled "William Johnson: Witness to a Vanished Natchez World." He presented readings directly from the diary of William Johnson. Smith focused on Johnson by examining his life as a free black barber and diarist who, while living in Natchez, Mississippi, during the antebellum period, became a successful business man. William Johnson was a free man of color (although born a slave) in a town cosmopolitan enough to admire his business ability and integrity, but unable to grant him full citizenship or social equality. As a result, Johnson made the best of the half-world in between, unburdening himself in page after page of priceless Old South observations while graciously passing his days with family, servants, and his trusty violin, living in a comfortable Natchez townhouse. The talks by Smith combined authentic images from the 1800s, with Johnson's own lively words, to revive the very human side of life in this famous African-American's vanished Natchez life.

== Musical activities ==
His scholarly knowledge of classical music derives from his degree in piano at the University of Mississippi, along with the 19 years of work with Columbia Artists Management, during which he traveled the United States for concert scheduling with symphony orchestras. His knowledge of music history and music literature is encyclopedic, as acknowledged by the Tupelo Symphony Orchestra, for which he presents pre-concert program lectures in collaboration with conductor Steven Byess. Additionally, he has reviewed classical music concerts for the Northeast Mississippi Daily Journal. An example of his mastery of English prose is shown in this excerpt of a review:

"In a memorable performance of Beethoven's Piano Concerto No. 2 with Steven Byess and the Tupelo Symphony, pianist Alexander Schimpf rekindled the kind of shimmering musical radiance and elation that obviously won him first prize in the famous Cleveland International Piano Competition less than nine months ago.

About 237 years earlier, during a hectic week in late March, 1795, another young man was grappling with the same piece of music. It was 25-year-old Ludwig van Beethoven, and he was rushing to complete the all-important concerto that he hoped would launch his own budding career skyward towards fame and fortune in hyper-musical Vienna. A few days later, at Beethoven's first performance before the Viennese public, it spectacularly did.

And here lies Concerto No. 2's dual charm. It's both the ambitiously crafted tool of an impatient piano virtuoso and musical genius eager to find his place in the sun, and it’s also a scintillating work of art, intermingling witty Mozartean grace with Beethoven’s own revolutionary new ideas about harmony and rhythm."

== Latest writings ==
Smith was equally adept at in-depth knowledge of quantum mechanics and physics, including deep space astronomy and gravitational waves. His recent writing includes the fusion of poetry and physics to explore the meaning of the universe.

== Educational activities ==
Smith was also involved in teaching classes during the evening as a part of the curriculum at the University of Mississippi at the Tupelo campus.

== Death ==
Smith died in a car accident on August 13, 2014 at the age of 69.

His legacy was commemorated in an editorial by a close friend and contributor to the Northeast Mississippi Daily Journal.
