= Heartland Media =

American media company

Heartland Media LLC
- Company type: Private
- Industry: Broadcast television
- Founded: c. 2012
- Founder: Robert S. Prather, Jr.
- Key people: Robert S. Prather, Jr.; (Managing member)
- Subsidiaries: USA Television Holdings LLC; USA Television MidAmerica Holdings LLC
- Website: www.heartlandtv.com

Heartland Media, LLC is an American media company that owns television stations in smaller markets in the United States, though as of 2023 it currently only owns stations based St. Joseph, Missouri and the Utica–Rome metropolitan area in New York. The company is based in Atlanta, Georgia. It operates the television broadcasting companies, USA Television Holdings, LLC and USA Television MidAmerica Holdings, LLC (together USA TV) as a joint venture alongside MSouth Equity Partners. The company is run by Bob Prather, a former CEO of Gray Television, whose philosophy of station acquisitions, acquired during his time at Gray, is centered on "acquiring No. 1-rated stations, Big Four affiliates with strong local news operations targeting university towns and state capitols that are deeply ingrained in the fabric of their communities".

== History ==
Heartland Media made its first acquisition in September 2013, when it acquired NBC affiliate WKTV in Utica, New York, from Smith Media, which was the company's remaining television property. This was followed by the 2014 acquisition of Oregon-based Chambers Communications and its stations, KEZI in Eugene and KDRV in Medford, as well as the latter's satellite station in Klamath Falls, KDKF. Later that year, Heartland and MSouth Equity Partners also acquired NBC affiliate WTVA in Tupelo, Mississippi, from the Spain family, along with WTVA's shared services agreement with West Point-based Fox affiliate WLOV-TV (owned by Coastal Television).

In 2015, US Television Holdings would acquire CBS affiliate KHSL-TV in Chico, California, from GOCOM Media, LLC, in a deal that also concurrently saw the station's LMA partner, NBC affiliate KNVN, sold by K4 Media Holdings to Maxair Media, LLC, with KHSL selling up to 15 percent of KNVN's advertising time.

On August 26, 2016, Heartland agreed to acquire ABC affiliate WAAY-TV in Huntsville, Alabama, from Calkins Media, as that company sold the rest of its television stations to Raycom Media, who already owned WAFF in the market. The sale closed on May 1, 2017.

On June 13, 2016, USA Television MidAmerica Holdings, a Heartland Media and MSouth Equity Partners, announced its acquisition of five small-market stations owned by Nexstar Broadcasting Group and Media General for $115 million. The stations were sold to allow Nexstar to comply with FCC ownership rules as part of its acquisition of Media General, particularly in regards to national market coverage and rules forbidding duopolies in these markets, which are among the smallest in the United States. The deal was consummated upon the approval of Nexstar's merger with Media General on January 17.

On October 1, 2019, Allen Media Broadcasting, a subsidiary of Entertainment Studios, announced that it would acquire 11 of USA TV's stations for $290 million. Heartland management would continue to manage the stations. The sale was approved by the FCC on November 22, 2019.

== Television stations ==
Stations are arranged in alphabetical order by state and city of license.

=== Current ===
City of license / Market	Station	Channel TV (RF)	Owned since	Network affiliation
St. Joseph, MO	KQTV	2 (7)	2017	ABC
Utica–Rome, NY	WKTV	2 (29)	2014	NBC; CBS (DT2); Independent (DT3)

=== Former ===
Media market	State	Station	Acquired	Sold	Notes
Huntsville	Alabama	WAAY-TV	2017	2020	
Chico–Redding	California	KHSL-TV	2015	2020	
Chico–Redding	California	KNVN	2015	2020	(Note: Heartland operated the station under a SSA.)
Fort Wayne	Indiana	WFFT-TV	2017	2020	
West Lafayette	Indiana	WLFI-TV	2017	2020	
Terre Haute	Indiana	WTHI-TV	2017	2020	
Rochester	Minnesota	KIMT	2017	2020	
Tupelo–Columbus	Mississippi	WTVA	2015	2020	
Tupelo–Columbus	Mississippi	WLOV-TV	2015	2020	
Eugene	Oregon	KEZI	2014	2020	
Medford–Klamath Falls	Oregon	KDRV	2014	2020	
Medford–Klamath Falls	Oregon	KDKF	2014	2020	(Note: Satellite of KDRV.)
