= North Mississippi Symphony Orchestra =

Coordinates: 34.257118°N 88.708187°W

The North Mississippi Symphony Orchestra, formerly the Tupelo Symphony Orchestra, is the resident orchestral performing organization in Tupelo, Mississippi.

== History ==
The need for a symphony orchestra in Tupelo led to fund-raising efforts, including organization of the community resources initially required for the development of the orchestra, through the leadership of attorney Wade H. Lagrone. The orchestra was founded in 1971.

== Musical director and conductor ==
Steven Byess is the current music director and has led the TSO since 2006. He is the cover conductor for the Detroit Symphony Orchestra, opera conductor for the Cleveland Institute of Music and the California State University - Los Angeles, in addition to the conductor at the International Vocal Arts Institute in Tel Aviv, Israel and the former music director of the Ohio Light Opera.

The previous conductor of the Tupelo Symphony Orchestra was Louis Lane, a recipient of the Mahler medal. He was the principal guest conductor of the Dallas Symphony Orchestra from 1973 to 1978 and co-conductor of the Atlanta Symphony Orchestra from 1977 through 1983. Mr. Lane became music director laureate of the Tupelo Symphony Orchestra in 2006.

== Reviews ==
During his lifetime, each concert was reviewed in the Northeast Mississippi Daily Journal by a known local music authority, Robert Bruce Smith, IV.
