= Truth & Salvage Co. =

American roots rock/Americana band

- Origin: Los Angeles, California, United States
- Genres: Roots rock, country, Americana, indie folk, Southern rock
- Years active: 2005–present
- Labels: Silver Arrow/Megaforce Records, distribution Sony RED
- Members: Bill "Smitty" Smith; Adam Grace; Walker Young; Tim Jones; Scott Kinnebrew; Dean Moore
- Website: www.truthandsalvageco.com

Truth & Salvage Co. is a six-piece roots rock/Americana band from Los Angeles, California, and currently headquartered in Nashville, Tennessee. The band formed in late 2005 when members from Scrappy Hamilton and Old Pike, two simultaneously performing Los Angeles acts, merged and began performing under their current moniker. The band gained national attention in 2009, when Black Crowes frontman Chris Robinson signed the group to his Silver Arrow label and gave them the opening slot on his band's tour that year. The band released their debut album (produced by Robinson) on May 25, 2010, and their second record, Pick Me Up, on Megaforce/Sony RED on July 23, 2013.

== Early years ==
The majority of Truth & Salvage Co. convened in the city of Asheville, North Carolina, in the early 2000s while performing in other groups. Bill "Smitty" Smith, Joe Edel, Walker Young and Scott Kinnebrew first started playing together in the jazz/ragtime outfit Scrappy Hamilton in the Spring of 1999, touring the East Coast extensively for five years and releasing three albums independently. The band gained some underground notoriety, opening for such well-established acts as Squirrel Nut Zippers, Dirty Dozen Brass Band, The Moldy Peaches and Rebirth Brass Band. During this time, the band had a song ("Wastin' Time," penned by Kinnebrew) featured in the 2002 horror film, Cabin Fever.

During this same time period, Tim Jones was the leader of the reasonably successful rock outfit Old Pike, based out of Indianapolis, Indiana. Signed early in their career to Epic Records subsidiary 550 Music, the band (featuring future members of My Morning Jacket and Roguewave) recorded and released a debut album (produced by Jim Scott) and toured extensively. The band gained attention by supporting such successful artists as Ben Folds Five, Whiskeytown, John Mellencamp and The Old 97s. Despite such early success, however, the group opted to disband in 2001, at which time Jones moved to Los Angeles with the intent of beginning a solo career.

Adam Grace grew up in Tupelo, Mississippi, and toured the South making a name for himself in the college circuit. At seventeen, Adam moved to New York City and pursued acting and music, eventually landing a role on Broadway. In 2001 Adam moved to Los Angeles and backed many a musician on the scene, including Gary Jules who released the remake of Tears For Fears' hit single "Mad World" for the hit film Donnie Darko. Throughout the early 2000s, Grace shared stages with top touring acts and made numerous appearances on TV shows as an actor, musician, and magician. As with his Truth & Salvage Co. counterpart Tim Jones, Grace would find himself relocating to Los Angeles in the early-2000s in an effort to further his career.

In 2005, Scrappy Hamilton relocated to Los Angeles, attempting to boost their popularity by performing in a larger market. At the time, Jones was performing at the Hotel Cafe in Hollywood every Sunday night. In between Scrappy Hamilton gigs, Smith, Edel, Young and Kinnebrew became resident musicians at Cranes Hollywood Tavern with a musical collaborative called the Beachwood Rockers. The buzz surrounding each residency would eventually draw the five musicians together. When Adam Grace found his way into the mix, the line-up was set, and Truth & Salvage Co. was born.

In late 2008, Truth & Salvage Co. caught the attention of Black Crowes frontman and co-songwriter Chris Robinson, who had recently established his own record label (Silver Arrow) with his brother Rich Robinson. Enthusiastic about the band's potential, Robinson immediately signed the band to his label, providing Truth & Salvage Co. with the distinction of being the first artist on the Silver Arrow roster. Robinson also enlisted the band as the opening act for the Black Crowes' 2009 tour in support of their Before the Frost...Until the Freeze record, a slot that would expose Truth & Salvage Co. to just the right audience for their sound. On this tour, a four-track EP was made available, featuring four songs from the band's album, which was revealed to be in process in Los Angeles and being produced by Robinson.

== Recent ==
On May 25, 2010, the band released its debut album, Truth & Salvage Co., on Silver Arrow/Megaforce Records. Produced by Chris Robinson, it features 12 tracks (including the four previously released on their 2009 EP of the same name). The album gained early attention from such media outlets as USA Today and All Music Guide and set the stage for the band to embark on a summer tour across the United States. The 43-date run marked the band's first headlining tour of non-club venues and included performances at a number of high-profile summer festivals, including Bonnaroo, Beale Street Music Festival, Wakarusa, Stagecoach Festival and High Sierra Music Festival.

The band's song "Them Jeans," a bonus track on the iTunes version of their debut, was subsequently selected by Gap Jeans to be featured on the fashion retailer's new iPad e-commerce application.

For a 2011 winter tour that began on January 26, Frank DiVanna began appearing as the band's bassist. The press release issued prior to the tour listed DiVanna as a member with no explanation given for Joe Edel's departure. DiVanna has since been replaced by Dean Moore.

The band released their second record, Pick Me Up, on Megaforce/Sony RED on July 23, 2013. The record was co-produced by the band and Jon Ashley with Bill Reynolds handling the mix. Recorded as a "joyous tour de force" at Echo Mountain studio in Asheville, NC, the album features 12 original tracks and a cover of Joe South’s Grammy-winning 1968 hit “Games People Play.”

== Discography ==
- Truth & Salvage Co. EP (Silver Arrow, 2009)
- Daytrotter Sessions: December 2009 (Daytrotter, 2009) (Internet-only Release)
- Truth & Salvage Co. (Silver Arrow, 2010)
- Salvage Songs, Vol. 1 (Limited-edition self-released EP, 2012)
- Pick Me Up (Megaforce/Sony RED, 2013)
