= Frank Dowsing =

American football player (1951–1994)

Frank D. Dowsing (September 3, 1951 – July 11, 1994) was the first African-American to play football for both Tupelo High School and Mississippi State University.

== History ==
In the fall of 1967, Tupelo instituted a "choice" system, whereby students at all-white Tupelo High School and all-black Carver High School were given the opportunity to choose which school to attend. While no white students chose Carver, Dowsing was one of five African-American students who chose to attend Tupelo High School, and was the first to play football. Unlike school integration in many other areas of Mississippi and the South, this was a peaceful event. Because of a broken jaw, which had been wired shut, Dowsing was unable to speak or practice football at the beginning of school. His first action was for the B team, where he scored a touchdown on the opening play. Dowsing earned all conference honors in football, basketball, and track, and graduated sixth in his class. He also set a state record by running the 100 yard dash in 9.5 seconds.

Due to recruitment efforts by former Tupelo resident and future Mississippi State basketball coach Kermit Davis, he enrolled at Mississippi State, where he was also the first black football player. At MSU, Dowsing was an all-American as a defensive back, an academic all-American, and was elected Mr. Mississippi State by his fellow students. This was the first time a black student had won any sort of election at the school. Just before graduation, he married LaFawn Gilliam in the Chapel of Memories at Mississippi State.

Upon graduation, Dowsing was drafted 392nd overall in the 16th round of the 1973 NFL draft by the Philadelphia Eagles, but instead chose to fulfill a lifelong dream by attended medical school at the University of Mississippi Medical Center. Within two years of their marriage, the couple divorced and Dowsing dropped out of medical school in his third year. It was later revealed that Dowsing was gay. Dowsing then worked for Bell Telephone in California, until he was diagnosed with AIDS in the late 1980s. He died of the disease in 1994.

In 2010, Dowsing was inducted into the Mississippi Sports Hall of Fame and Museum, where he was nicknamed "The Jackie Robinson of Mississippi". In 2017, Mississippi State dedicated a plaza at the football stadium to Dowsing.
