= ABC45 =

ABC 45 may refer to the following American Broadcasting Company affiliates:

== Current ==
- WXLV-TV in Winston-Salem, North Carolina

== Former ==
- WKDH in Houston, Mississippi (2001–2012)
