= WKDH =

Television station in Houston, Mississippi (1998–2012)

- Houston–Tupelo–Columbus–; West Point, Mississippi; United States
- City: Houston, Mississippi
- Channels: Digital: 45 (UHF); Virtual: 45
- Branding: WKDH ABC 45

Programming
- Affiliations: ABC (2001–2012)

Ownership
- Owner: Southern Broadcasting
- Operator: WTVA, Inc. via LMA
- Sister stations: WLOV-TV, WTVA

History
- Founded: July 12, 1998
- First air date: June 18, 2001
- Last air date: August 31, 2012
- Former channel numbers: Analog: 45 (UHF, 2001–2007)
- Call sign meaning: Chosen at random based on how easy it was to say

Technical information
- Facility ID: 83310
- ERP: 537 kW
- HAAT: 491 m (1,611 ft)
- Transmitter coordinates: 33°47′39.3″N 89°5′16″W

WKDH (channel 45) was a television station licensed to Houston, Mississippi, United States, which served as the ABC affiliate for the Columbus–Tupelo market. WKDH was owned by Southern Broadcasting, which was headed by Walter D. Spain whose father, Frank K. Spain, owned Tupelo-based NBC affiliate WTVA (channel 9). As such, the station was operated under a local marketing agreement (LMA) with WTVA; the Spain family also operated West Point–licensed Fox affiliate WLOV-TV (channel 27) under a separate LMA. The three stations shared studios on Beech Springs Road (County Road 681) in Saltillo; WKDH's transmitter was located in Woodland, Mississippi.

== History ==
The station signed on June 18, 2001, as the fourth commercial station in the market. WKDH was an ABC affiliate from the start, and was its second affiliate in the market; WLOV-TV carried ABC programming from 1983 (as WVSB-TV) until switching to Fox in October 1995. In the six years that the market had no ABC affiliate, cable systems in the area piped in WPTY-TV from Memphis, Tennessee (which became an ABC affiliate in December 1995 and formerly served as the default Fox affiliate for the area), or WCFT-TV from Tuscaloosa, Alabama (which became a semi-satellite of Birmingham ABC affiliate WBMA-LP in September 1996).

On January 26, 2007, at 5 a.m., WKDH "flash-cut" its analog signal to digital on UHF channel 45, becoming the first station in the market to make the transition.

The station did not offer much local content, serving largely as a "pass-through" for ABC programming. It did produce a public affairs show, Community Edition, hosted by Stan Allen.

WKDH ceased broadcasting at 11:59 p.m. on August 31, 2012, after more than 11 years on the air; this was due to the Spain family's decision not to renew its LMA with Southern Broadcasting. The ABC affiliation for the Columbus–Tupelo–West Point market moved to the second digital subchannel of WTVA; before this announcement, Comcast had planned to import an out-of-market ABC affiliate. Though a sale of the station was explored, the only buyer found pulled out of the deal, and on January 31, 2013, Southern Broadcasting surrendered the WKDH license to the Federal Communications Commission, which canceled it on February 7.
