= WLOV-TV =

Television station in West Point, Mississippi

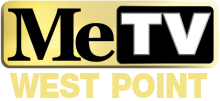
- West Point–Columbus–Tupelo–; Starkville, Mississippi; United States
- City: West Point, Mississippi
- Channels: Digital: 16 (UHF); Virtual: 27
- Branding: WLOV CW 27; MeTV West Point (27.2)

Programming
- Affiliations: 27.1: CW+; for others, see § Subchannels

Ownership
- Owner: Coastal Television Broadcasting Company LLC; (WLOV License LLC)
- Operator: Morris Multimedia
- Sister stations: WCBI-TV

History
- First air date: May 29, 1983
- Former call signs: WVSB-TV (1983–1991)
- Former channel numbers: Analog: 27 (UHF, 1983–2009)
- Former affiliations: ABC (1983–1995); Fox (1995–2024); UPN (secondary, late 1990s−2002)
- Call sign meaning: Love Communications (former owner)

Technical information
- Licensing authority: FCC
- Facility ID: 37732
- ERP: 390 kW
- HAAT: 508.9 m (1,670 ft)
- Transmitter coordinates: 33°47′39.3″N 89°5′16″W

Links
- Public license information: Public file; LMS

WLOV-TV (channel 27) is a television station licensed to West Point, Mississippi, United States, serving as the CW+ affiliate for the Columbus–Tupelo market. It is owned by Coastal Television Broadcasting Company and operated by Morris Multimedia alongside Columbus-licensed CBS/Fox/MyNetworkTV affiliate WCBI-TV (channel 4). The two stations share studios on 5th Street South in Downtown Columbus; WLOV-TV's transmitter is located in Woodland, Mississippi.

== History ==
WLOV-TV's logo until 2009. Logo was similar to KJTV-TV.

The station signed on as WVSB-TV on May 29, 1983, as the third commercial station in the market. It was supposed to launch on May 1, but equipment and weather delays pushed the date back. Originally owned by Venture Systems and airing an analog signal on UHF channel 27, WVSB immediately became a full ABC affiliate. Previously, WTVA (channel 9), a primary NBC affiliate, carried select ABC programming in off-hours. This made the Columbus–Tupelo market one of the last in the country with full network service. From its start, the station had the disadvantage of being a UHF-band television station competing with two well-established VHF stations with wealthier ownership.

Love Communications would buy WVSB in 1991 and changed the call sign to WLOV-TV on September 9. Despite efforts to educate viewers about obtaining the station, competition from WTVA and CBS affiliate WCBI-TV was fierce. In May 1992, it entered into a program service agreement (predecessor to local marketing agreement) with WTVA. On November 25 of that year, the Federal Communications Commission (FCC) cleared the deal allowing WLOV to move its facilities from West Point to Tupelo. At first, WLOV moved into offices in the Tupelo Community Antenna (now Comcast) building, but it was eventually integrated into WTVA's studios in Saltillo.

Lingard Broadcasting Corporation purchased the station in August 1994, continuing the partnership with WTVA. At the same time, WLOV became a secondary Fox affiliate. Before that, cable systems in the area piped in the network's affiliates in Memphis (WMKW-TV/WLMT, WPTY-TV after 1990) or Birmingham (WDBB, WTTO after 1990). On October 10, 1995, WLOV dropped ABC completely, and became a full Fox affiliate, leaving Northeast Mississippi and the part of West Alabama the station served without a local affiliate until the launch of WKDH on June 18, 2001. During that period, cable systems in the area continued to carry WPTY and those on the Alabama side of the market began to import WCFT-TV from Tuscaloosa, Alabama, when it became a satellite of ABC affiliate WBMA-LP in September 1996 after WBRC affiliated with Fox. During the late 1990s, WLOV also served as a secondary affiliate of UPN. In September 2002, UPN moved to WCBI-DT2.

WLOV's digital signal on UHF channel 16 signed on August 22, 2004, and upgraded to full-powered high definition level in April 2007. On April 1 of that year, WLOV launched a new second digital subchannel to be the market's This TV affiliate. Although not initially carried on digital cable systems, WLOV-DT2 was eventually picked up by carriage agreements.

On September 1, 2012, WLOV added MeTV to digital subchannel 27.2; the network relocated from WTVA, which switched the affiliation of its second digital subchannel from MeTV to ABC on that date, due to the August 31 shutdown of WKDH (which WTVA-DT2 effectively replaced the affiliate for the Columbus–Tupelo–West Point market). This TV was relocated to a new third digital subchannel to make room for MeTV. Lingard Broadcasting filed to sell WLOV to Tupelo Broadcasting on December 21, 2012; the new owners continued the station's agreements with WTVA. The sale was consummated on August 13.

Heartland Media announced its purchase of WTVA from the Spain family on September 16, 2014; while WLOV-TV itself was not included in the deal as it is owned separately, Heartland inherited WTVA's agreements with WLOV. Three weeks later, on October 7, Coastal Television Broadcasting Company (which owns fellow Fox affiliate KTBY in Anchorage, Alaska) announced that it would acquire WLOV. Both transactions were completed on February 11, 2015. Since the late 2010s, WLOV primarily identified using its call sign instead of the network mandated Fox 27, although it included the Fox logo in its station identification.

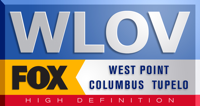
WLOV-TV's logo until 2024.

On February 1, 2024, it was announced that the Fox affiliation would move from WLOV to WCBI-DT2 the next day. WLOV would assume WCBI-DT2's CW Plus affiliation.

== Newscasts ==
In 1991, WLOV aired newscasts from Mississippi News Tonight, which were produced by then-owners Love Communications, in conjunction with Fox affiliate WDBD in Jackson. These operations folded after eight months on the air in April 1992. For several weeks afterward, staff from the defunct Mississippi News Tonight newscast moved to WLOV to produce a local newscast before WTVA took over newscast operations in May.

In March 2000, WTVA began producing a Sunday through Friday night prime time newscast on this station. Formerly known as WLOV News at Nine, this broadcast can be seen for thirty minutes. It began to have competition on September 8, 2008, when WCBI added a weeknight-only half-hour newscast on its second digital subchannel (which carries Fox sister service MyNetworkTV). On April 20, 2009, WTVA became the first station in the market and second in the state to upgrade local news to high definition. Compared nationwide, it was the smallest market outlet that made the change. WLOV News at Nine would not be included in the upgrade until June 22.

On February 1, 2024, alongside the move of the Fox affiliation to WCBI-DT2, the station announced it had entered an SSA with WCBI-TV, providing newscasts to WLOV.

== Technical information ==
=== Subchannels ===
The station's signal is multiplexed:

Subchannels of WLOV-TV
Subchannel	Res.	Short name	Programming
27.1	720p	WLOV-DT	The CW Plus
27.2	480i	MeTV	MeTV
27.3	480i	DEFY	Ion Plus
27.4	480i	TCN	MeTV Toons

=== Analog-to-digital conversion ===
WLOV-TV shut down its analog signal, over UHF channel 27, on February 17, 2009, the original target date on which full-power television stations in the United States were to transition from analog to digital broadcasts under federal mandate (which was later pushed back to June 12, 2009). The station's digital signal remained on its pre-transition UHF channel 16, using virtual channel 27.
