= Tupelo High School =

Public school in Tupelo, Mississippi, US

Location
- 4125 Golden Wave Drive; Tupelo, Mississippi 38801; United States; US_type:edu 34.232°N 88.764°W

Information
- Type: Public
- Established: 1914
- School district: Tupelo Public School District
- Principal: Melissa Thomas
- Teaching staff: 133.33 (on FTE basis)
- Grades: 9 to 12
- Gender: Co-ed
- Enrollment: 2,101 (2023–2024)
- Student to teacher ratio: 15.76
- Colors: Blue and Gold
- Mascot: Golden Wave
- Accreditation: Southern Association of Colleges and Schools
- Newspaper: The Hi-Times
- Yearbook: The Album
- Website: www.tupeloschools.com/tupelo-high-school

Tupelo High School is the only public high school in Tupelo, Mississippi. The campus consists of fourteen buildings, including a Performing Arts Center, separate buildings for social studies, English, math, sciences, fine arts, and a self-contained grade-9 building.

The current student population of the school is around 2,000 students. As of 2014–2015, it is the largest enrolled public high school in the state of Mississippi. The class of 2015 consisted of 438 graduates. The school offers a curriculum containing 160 Carnegie units, 24 of which are Advanced Placement.

Tupelo High School is a two-time National Blue Ribbon School award winner, having won the award in 1983-1984 and another in 1999–2000.

The school's boundary includes the vast majority of Tupelo and a portion of Saltillo.

== History ==
Tupelo High School was established in 1914.

Until 1971 and desegregation, Black students in Tupelo attended Lee County Training School and then Carver High School. The segregated schools would alternate nights using Robins Field for football games.

In 1992 the school moved to a new university-style campus, with 14 different buildings on 75 acres.

== Demographics ==
In 2023, the student body was about 49 percent Black, 36 percent White, and 8 percent Hispanic.

== Student life ==
As of 2022- 2023, Tupelo High School offers extracurricular activities, including football, slowpitch and fastpitch softball, cross country, volleyball, swimming, basketball, soccer, bowling, archery, baseball, wrestling, golf, tennis, cheer, and track and field. In addition to athletics, the school offers other clubs, such as theatre, a school newspaper, arts, and mock trials.

== Notable alumni ==
- Chad Bumphis, professional football player
- Alex Carrington, professional football player
- Russell Copeland, professional football player
- Frank Dowsing, first black football player at both THS and Mississippi State
- John Dye, actor
- Deandre' Eiland, professional football player
- Mikky Ekko, singer-songwriter
- Adam Grace, musician
- Jarious Jackson, professional football player
- Jett Johnson, college football linebacker for the Mississippi State Bulldogs
- Todd Jordan, professional football player and Tupelo mayor
- Ken Kirk, professional football player
- Rae Sremmurd, hip-hop duo
- Chris Stratton, professional baseball player
- Tan White, professional basketball player
- Tamika Whitmore, professional basketball player
