= Ripley Historic District (Ripley, Mississippi) =

Historic district in Mississippi, United States

- U.S. National Register of Historic Places
- U.S. Historic district
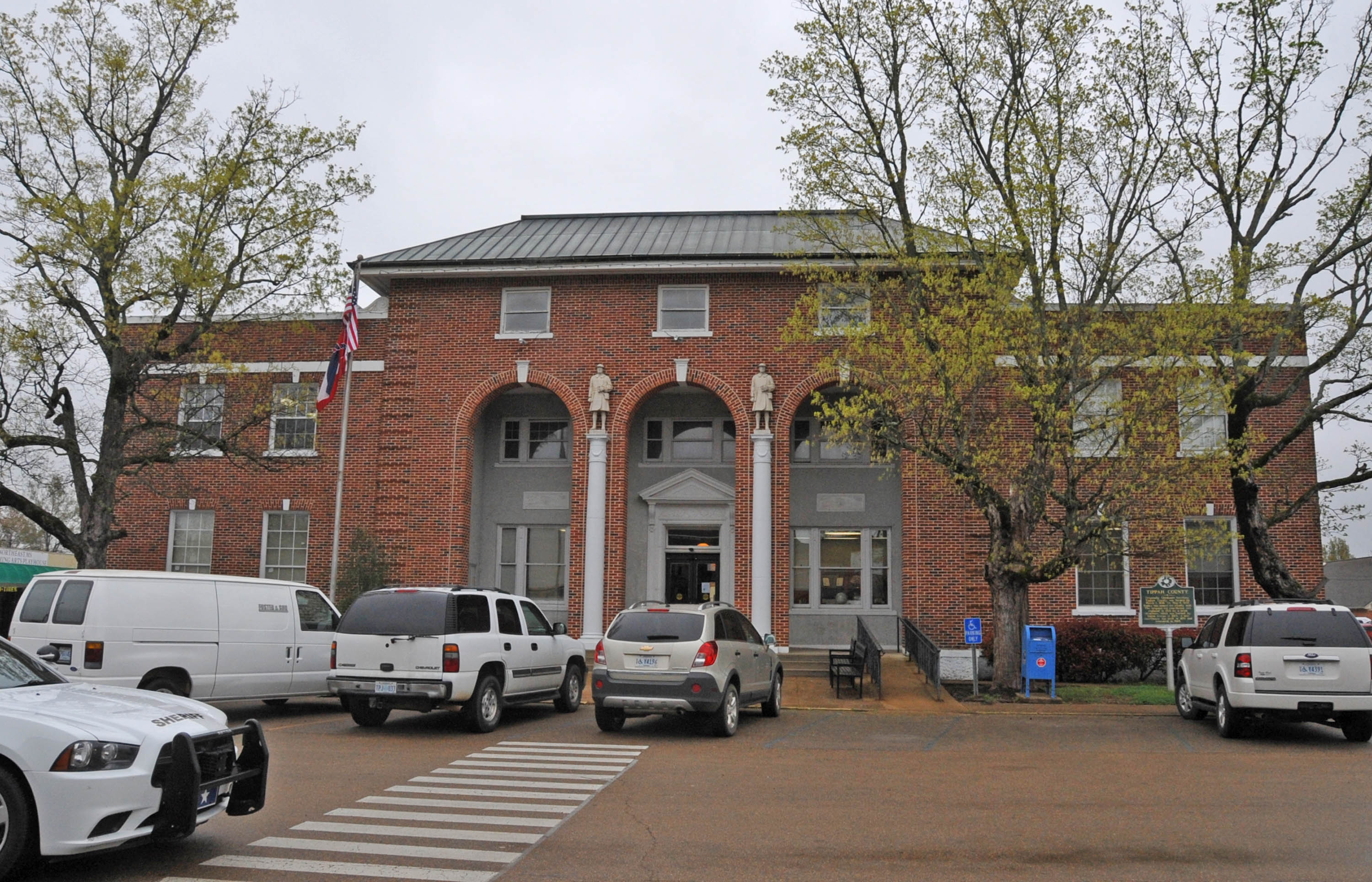

- Location within Mississippi Location within the United States
- Location: Roughly bounded by North St., Siddall St., MS and Middle St., Ripley, Mississippi
- Coordinates: 34°43′14″N 88°56′14″W
- Architectural style: Greek Revival, Queen Anne, Multiple Styles
- NRHP reference No.: 05000281
- Added to NRHP: April 07, 2005

Ripley Historic District is a historic district comprising the central portion of Ripley, Mississippi. It was listed on the National Register of Historic Places in 2005.

The district was listed for its significance to community planning and development, commerce, and agriculture. The buildings reflect Ripley's development as the county seat of Tippah County. The district contains 284 contributing properties and one contributing object, a Confederate memorial. These buildings date from the 1840s through 1954, the end of the period for which the nomination was submitted. The town was founded in 1837, but there are no commercial structures that remain from the pre-American Civil War era.

The district is centered on the Tippah County Courthouse, the historic and symbolic central building in the city, which was built in 1928. The courthouse is surrounded by several blocks of commercial buildings, which primarily extend to the north, south, and west and were mostly built between 1910 and 1940. The district includes the old U.S. post office, which was also added to the National Register in 2000. The district also includes the former Tippah County Jail, an Art Moderne building built in 1938; four historic churches; and a variety of houses. The homes in the district are mainly bungalows and Tudor Revival buildings; most were built between 1910 and 1940, though some were constructed as early as the 1840s.

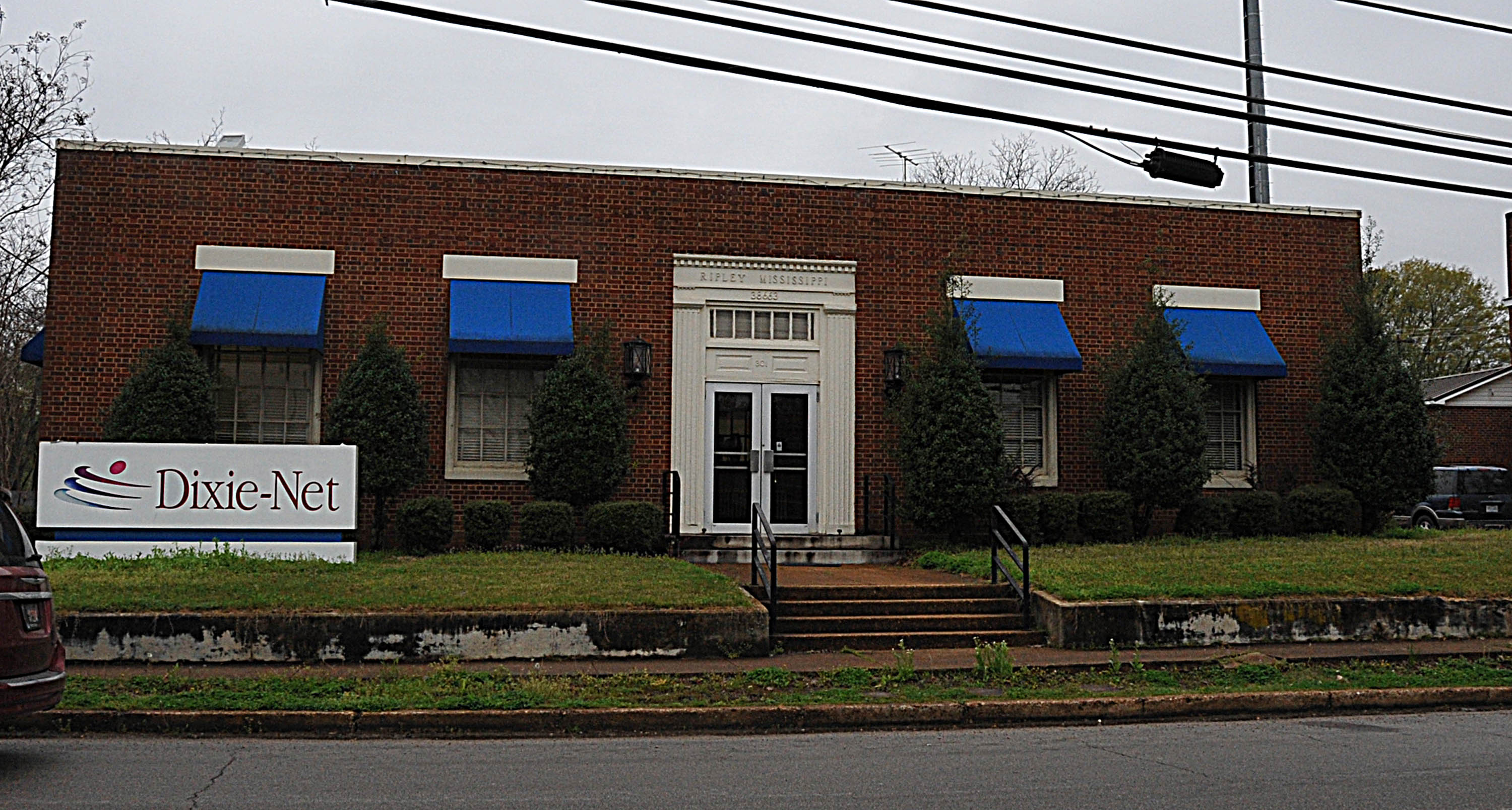
Old Post Office
