= Carver High School (Tupelo, Mississippi) =

Segregated African-American school

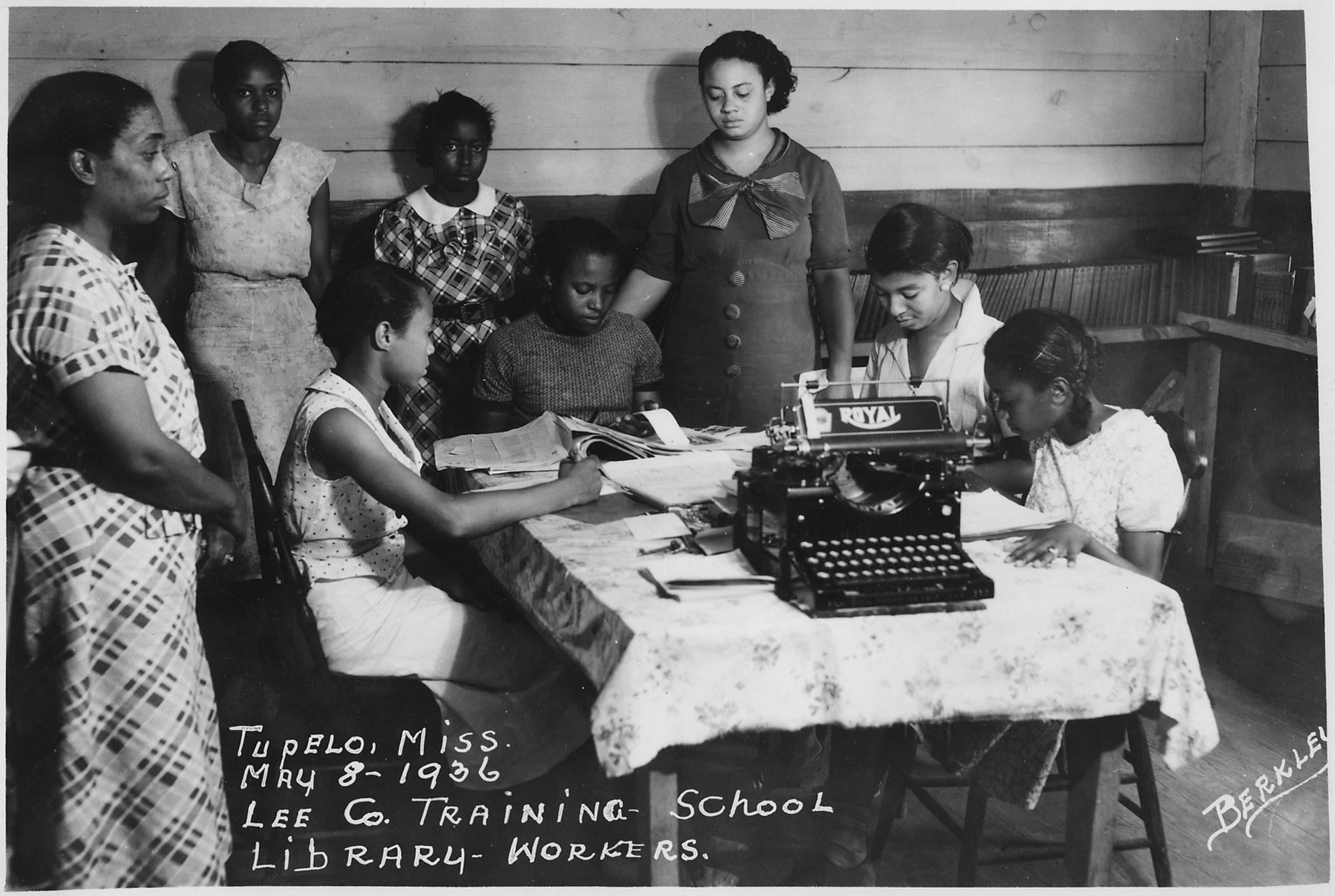

Location
- Tupelo, Mississippi; United States
- Coordinates: 34.272222°N 88.706389°W

Information
- Former name: Lee County Training School
- Type: Segregated public school

Carver High School was a public secondary school in Tupelo, Mississippi, United States. It served as the high school for black students until the public schools were integrated in the late 1960s. The buildings are now Carver Elementary School.

== History ==
Before it was renamed the school was known as the Lee County Training School. As with many black schools in Mississippi and throughout the South, it was called a training school in part because it was considered helpful in promoting education for blacks and in part due to local school boards preference not to call them high schools. In 1971 the schools were officially integrated, with Tupelo High School becoming the high school for students of all races. All ninth grade students, regardless of race, were placed at Carver.

Carver enjoyed an arrangement with Tupelo High School wherein both teams shared a common football field, Robins Field, from 1921 until integration. Tupelo played on Friday nights and Carver on Saturdays.

== Notable alumni ==
- Frank Dowsing, first black football player at both Tupelo High School and Mississippi State attended Carver until voluntary integration was allowed in 1968.
- Etta Zuber Falconer, mathematician
