= Carroll Roberson =

Protestant Christian evangelist (born 1955)

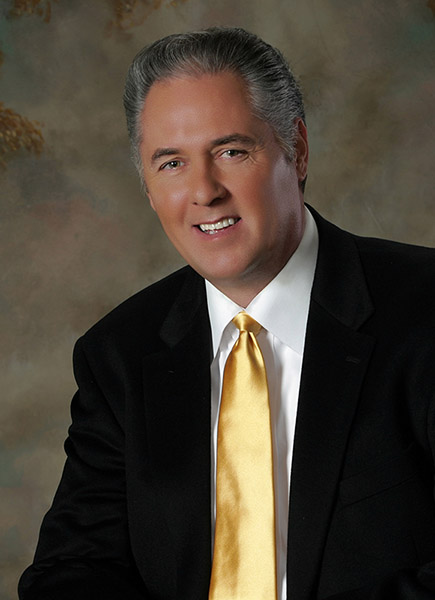
- Roberson in 2017
- Born: July 17, 1955 (age 71); Ripley, Mississippi, U.S.
- Occupation: Evangelist
- Spouse: Donna Roberson
- Children: Shane and Brandon
- Website: CarrollRoberson.com

Carroll Roberson (born July 17, 1955) is an American evangelist, gospel singer-songwriter, and author. He is founder and president of Carroll Roberson Ministries in Ripley, Mississippi.

== Biography ==
Roberson was born July 17, 1955, in Ripley, Mississippi. He read the Bible growing up but did not surrender his life to Christ until 1983. One year later, he was diagnosed with a cancerous growth on his throat. With no promise that he would be able to talk any more, Roberson underwent thyroid surgery and was able to sing again within three weeks. Shortly after, Roberson devoted himself to full-time ministry. After serving as minister of a Baptist church in his home town for two years, Roberson organized Carroll Roberson Ministries with a board of directors and went into full-time evangelism with his office stationed in his hometown of Ripley. Through revivals, crusades, and concerts, Roberson keeps a two-year schedule around the country.

== Ministry ==
=== Music career ===
Roberson is well known for his Gospel singing and has written over 300 songs and recorded over 50 albums. He has had national success with songs like "Wilt Thou Be Made Whole", which stayed at No. 1 on the Singing News charts in 1995 for two months as well as 15 top-ten songs throughout the late 1990s. He has had seven #1 songs: "Just Go By" in 1997 and "Good Mornin' Lord", "The Way We Should Live", "As Long As There's a Mornin’" in 2021 and "Jesus Says Hello" in January 2023. The song "I Know Who It Is" also reached the No. 1 chart position for January 2024, and "Jesus Put My Life Together" went to number one in February 2025. Carroll has had over 20 songs reach the top ten, and has sold well over a million records. Roberson has also received numerous nominations and awards for his singing, including the Top Soloist award from Voice Magazine and Hearts Aflame Soloist of the year in 1998. Carroll also received the "Living Legend Award" at the 2024 Gospel Fan Fair, by the Christian Voice Magazine.

=== Cashbox Magazine #1 Songs ===
- August 2026 - "What Is Man?"
- January 2026 - "His Mercies Are Fresh Everyday"
- February 2025 - “Jesus Put My Life Together”
- January 2024 - "I Know Who It Is"
- January 2023 - "Jesus Says Hello"
- 2021 - "Good Mornin' Lord"
- 2021 - "The Way We Should Live"
- 2021 - "As Long As There's a Mornin’"
- 1997 - "Just Go By"

=== YouTube channel ===
Roberson has thousands of music videos and 30 minute Bible teachings which are seen in millions of homes throughout the world on TV and YouTube. The videos feature straightforward Bible preaching and gospel music accompanied by his wife Donna and is filmed in various outdoor venues in the United States. His YouTube Channel replaced traditional TV programs so you can watch anytime. Carroll has also received the Silver Award for over 100,000 subscribers on his YouTube Channel, which has resulted in millions of views around the world. His YouTube Channel now has over 400,000 subscribers.

=== Holy Land tours ===
Roberson has been hosting tours to Israel since 1993. He has also filmed several teaching DVDs in Israel. Visiting the homeland of Jesus has touched Roberson very deeply, and he regularly researches the scriptures from the Hebraic perspective. Much of his time is devoted to Jewish studies on Jesus as the Messiah. His trips to Israel have motivated him to focus on the life and ministry of Jesus the Messiah in the gospel accounts. Carroll believes the missing link in most religious circles is studying the scriptures from their original intent.

=== Family life ===
He lives in Ripley, Mississippi, with his wife Donna. They have two sons, Shane and Brandon.

== Discography ==
- Paradise (1987 Harvest Records)
- Love Found A Pardon (1988 Harvest Records)
- The Best Of Carroll Roberson Volume 1 (1988 Harvest Records)
- A New Man (1989 Harvest Records)
- Riches Untold (1990 Harvest Records)
- Simple And Sincere (1991 Harvest Records)
- Just For Him (1991 MorningStar Records)
- Genuine (1992 MorningStar Records)
- Tell It Like It Is (1993 MorningStar Records)
- Christmas Is Believin' (1994 MorningStar Records)
- Serious Business (1995 MorningStar Records)
- A Wonderful Life (1996 MorningStar Records)
- His Hand in Mine (1996 MorningStar Records)
- Carroll's Collection (1997 MorningStar Records)
- A Common Man (1997 Cross And Crown Records)
- ...It's Who you Know (1998 Cross And Crown Records)
- The Wonder of Christmas (2000)
- One Life to Live (2001)
- My Christmas Dream (2002)
- Heaven (2002)
- Carroll Roberson with The Jordanaires (2002)
- I'll Sing for Him (2002)
- The Best of Carroll Roberson (2003)
- More Than a Man (2003)
- The Love of God (2003)
- Here I Am (2004)
- Happy and Free (w/ Donna Solo) (2004)
- The Masters Call (2004)
- He's Real (2005)
- Only One Messiah (2006)
- Memories of the Galilean (2006)
- Gospel Favorites (2006)
- I Walk On (2006)
- Make a Difference (2007)
- A Musical Heritage (2007)
- The Spirit of Praise (2008)
- Christmas in the Valley (2009)
- Songs of the South (2009)
- Rebel with a Cause (2009)
- Classic Gospel (2010)
- Early Years Vol.1 (2010)
- Early Years Vol.2 (2011)
- Heart and Soul (2010)
- Jesus Is Real (2011)
- Silver Edition (2012)
- A Brighter Day (2013)
- Christmas Memories (2013)
- Early Years Vol.4 (2014)
- Forever (2014)
- One Pair of Hands (2014)
- A Jesus Man (2015)
- Celebrating 30 Years (2016)
- The Best of Carroll Roberson Vol. 2 (2017)
- Treasures - Old and New (2017)
- Gospel Country Style (2018)
- Unchanging Love (2018)
- Praise the Lord (2019)
- Yesterday & Tomorrow (2020)
- Christmas Always (2020)
- The Pages of Time (2021)
- Pure Inspiration (2021)
- Underneath the Western Sky (DVD) (2022)
- Jesus Says Hello (2022)
- The Story of Life (2023)
- The Promise (2024)
- Unplugged (2024)
- A Man & Jesus (2025)
- Sheltered In His Arms (2026)
- The Mystery Of Christmas (2026)

== Books authored ==
Roberson has authored the following books:

- The Christ: His Miracles, His Ministry, His Mission (2007) ISBN 978-0-89221-610-9
- How To Enjoy Jesus (2008) ISBN 978-1-933641-24-9
- In The Fullness of Time (2008) ISBN 978-1-933641-24-9
- Jesus and the 5 Senses (2010) ISBN 978-1-936076-19-2
- Matthew the Hebrew Gospel (2011) ISBN 978-1-936076-61-1
- Christmas In Those Days (2013) ISBN 978-1-61314-175-5
- Yeshua, the Messiah, the God-Man (2015) ISBN 978-1-5127-0737-3
- John the Jewish Gospel (2017) ISBN 978-1-5127-6817-6
- Luke the Lord's Gospel (2018) ISBN 978-1-9736-1565-1
- Mark the Messiah's Gospel (2019) ISBN 978-1-9736-5759-0
- 40 Days With the Risen Christ (2019) ISBN 978-0-578-22482-4
- Ministry $ Money (2021) ISBN 978-1-61314-776-4
- Acts... and They Continued (2021) ISBN 978-1-61314-817-4
- Romans (2023) ISBN 978-1-61314-941-6
- Israel: Blessing-Tribulation-Glory (2024) ISBN 979-8-88928-012-5
- The Galilee, Where Jesus Lived (2025) ISBN 9798889280811
