= Tupelo Public School District =

School district in Mississippi

Coordinates: 34.256334°N 88.706339°W

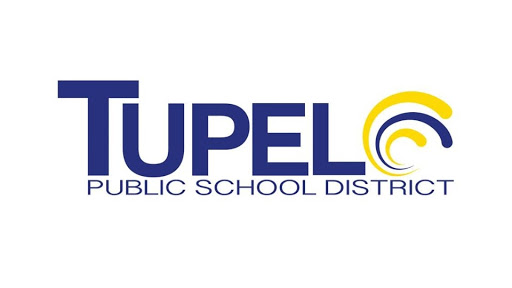
The official logo design for the Tupelo Public School District

The Tupelo Public School District is a public school district based in Tupelo, Mississippi (USA). The school district currently has 13 schools, grades Pre-K - 12th, that are in regular function throughout the year.

It includes most of the city of Tupelo and a small portion of Saltillo.

== Schools ==
=== High school ===
- Grades 9-12
  - Tupelo High School

=== Middle schools ===
- Grades 7-8
  - Tupelo Middle School
- Grade 6
  - Milam Elementary School

=== Elementary schools ===
- Grades 3-5
  - Carver Elementary School
  - Lawndale Elementary School
  - Rankin Elementary School
    - 2000-2001 National Blue Ribbon School
- Grades K-2
  - Church Street Elementary School
    - 2000-2001 National Blue Ribbon School
  - Joyner Elementary School
  - Lawhon Elementary School
  - Parkway Elementary School
  - Pierce Street Elementary School
  - Thomas Street Elementary School
    - 1989-1990 and 2000-2001 National Blue Ribbon School
- Preschool
  - Early Childhood Education Center (ECEC)

=== Alternative school ===
- Grades K-12
  - Fillmore Center

== Demographics ==
=== 2006-07 school year ===
There were a total of 7,190 students enrolled in the Tupelo Public School District during the 2006–2007 school year. The gender makeup of the district was 50% female and 50% male. The racial makeup of the district was 46.24% African American, 49.86% White, 2.21% Hispanic, 1.66% Asian, and 0.03% Native American. 42.2% of the district's students were eligible to receive free lunch.

=== Previous school years ===
School Year	Enrollment	Gender Makeup		Racial Makeup				
School Year	Enrollment	Female	Male	Asian	African American	Hispanic	Native American	White
2005-06	7,272	50%	50%	1.50%	46.15%	2.01%	0.07%	50.28%
2004-05	7,172	49%	51%	1.42%	44.23%	1.32%	0.01%	53.01%
2003-04	7,264	49%	51%	1.27%	42.86%	1.24%	0.03%	54.61%
2002-03	7,282	49%	51%	1.10%	41.71%	1.04%	0.04%	56.11%

== Accountability statistics ==
	2006-07	2005-06	2004-05	2003-04	2002-03
District Accreditation Status	Accredited	Accredited	Accredited	Accredited	Accredited
School Performance Classifications
Level 5 (Superior Performing) Schools	8	6	8	6	6
Level 4 (Exemplary) Schools	4	6	4	4	5
Level 3 (Successful) Schools	0	0	0	2	1
Level 2 (Under Performing) Schools	0	0	0	0	0
Level 1 (Low Performing) Schools	0	0	0	0	0
Not Assigned	0	0	0	0	0

== See also ==
- List of school districts in Mississippi

== School district homepage ==
- Official website
