= WTVA =

Television station in Tupelo, Mississippi

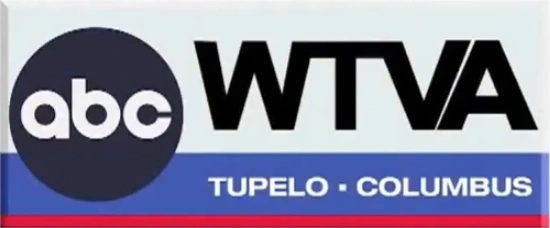
- Tupelo–Columbus–; West Point, Mississippi; United States
- City: Tupelo, Mississippi
- Channels: Digital: 11 (VHF); Virtual: 9
- Branding: WTVA 9; ABC WTVA (9.2)

Programming
- Affiliations: 9.1: NBC; 9.2: ABC; for others, see § Subchannels

Ownership
- Owner: Gray Media; (Gray Television Licensee, LLC)

History
- First air date: March 18, 1957
- Former call signs: WTWV (1957–1979)
- Former channel numbers: Analog: 9 (VHF, 1957–2009); Digital: 57 (UHF, 1999–2008), 8 (VHF, 2008–2020); Translator: W22BS 22 (UHF) Tupelo
- Former affiliations: ABC (secondary, 1957–1983)
- Call sign meaning: Tennessee Valley Authority (Tupelo was the first city to receive TVA-generated electricity); also from then-current "TV Alive" branding

Technical information
- Licensing authority: FCC
- Facility ID: 74148
- ERP: 42.1 kW
- HAAT: 540.9 m (1,775 ft)
- Transmitter coordinates: 33°47′40″N 89°5′16″W

Links
- Public license information: Public file; LMS
- Website: www.wtva.com

WTVA (channel 9) is a television station licensed to Tupelo, Mississippi, United States, serving the Columbus–Tupelo market as an affiliate of NBC and ABC. The station is owned by Gray Media. WTVA's studios are located on Beech Springs Road (County Road 681) in Saltillo, and its transmitter is located in Woodland, Mississippi.

== History ==
=== WTWV ===
WTVA was the brainchild of Frank K. Spain, an engineering graduate of Mississippi State University, who had helped build NBC-owned station WNBW (now WRC-TV) in Washington, D.C. As then Technical Director at WHEN-TV in Syracuse, New York, in the early-1950s, he dreamed of bringing a television station to Tupelo, where he had spent most of his childhood. Spain applied for a license in 1953 which was granted by the Federal Communications Commission (FCC) in 1956. The station began airing on March 18, 1957, with the call letters WTWV. Its equipment (antenna, transmitter, cameras, etc.) was hand-built in Spain's garage, backyard, and basement in Syracuse.

Spain hoped to parlay his good relations with NBC officials into getting his new station an affiliation with the network. However, several NBC executives believed Tupelo was not a desirable place for a local station because of its rural location, even though most viewers in northern Mississippi could only get NBC via grade B coverage from WMC-TV in Memphis, Tennessee, WLBT in Jackson, Mississippi (those two now sister stations of WTVA), and WAPI-TV (now WVTM-TV) in Birmingham, Alabama. Nonetheless, they told Spain that if he could figure out a way to obtain a network signal, he could carry it.

Spain allegedly negotiated under-the-table deals with WMC-TV and set up a network of microwave relays and repeater systems to carry the WMC-TV signal to Tupelo. Station engineers then switched to and from the signal when network programming aired. This setup, necessary in the days before satellites, enabled WTWV to bring NBC programming to northeastern Mississippi and northwestern Alabama. The station also carried a secondary affiliation with ABC (which apparently necessitated the use of WHBQ-TV, now a Fox affiliate).

In the mid-1960s, WTWV was approached by ABC about becoming a full affiliate of that network. Spain, who was still receiving "bootleg" NBC programming, told NBC executives about ABC's offer to pay him the customary rates. This prompted NBC to finally negotiate a formal deal with Spain, which made WTWV an official NBC affiliate—one of only three primary NBC affiliates in Mississippi at the time. It still carried some ABC programming in off-hours (namely, college football on Saturdays) until WVSB (now WLOV-TV) in nearby West Point began operating in 1983. Starting in 1972, WTWV operated a full-time satellite for eastern central Mississippi, WHTV (now WMDN) in Meridian on channel 24; WHTV operated as such until 1980, when Spain decided to make it a stand-alone station, with a CBS affiliation. WTWV built a new tower in the 1970s that not only brought a city-grade signal to Columbus for the first time, but gave the station one of the largest coverage areas in the country.

=== WTVA ===
On July 4, 1979, WTWV changed its call letters to "WTVA" to reinforce its identity, not only as the first TVA city, but also its then-current branding of "TV Alive". The WTWV call sign was later used on WFRQ, a radio station in Mashpee, Massachusetts, on Cape Cod. The WTWV call sign is now in use by a Memphis-based TV station. Neither the Massachusetts nor the Memphis station are related to the current WTVA.

Frank Spain was CEO of WTVA until his death on April 25, 2006. He continued to visit the station regularly well into his seventies. His widow Jane assumed the CEO position until the station was sold in September 2014. The outlet was the first commercial television station in Mississippi to devote its entire morning broadcast schedule to educational programming. The station also made history as the first in Mississippi to broadcast a live basketball game. In the late 1990s, WTVA launched a low-power translator, W22BS, which served as a primary UPN affiliate, before selling the station to rival WCBI in 2002. The Spains continued to own WHTV/WMDN until it was sold to Meridian Media (now Waypoint Media) in January 2008.

Although WTVA formerly operated WLOV through local marketing agreement (LMA), and previously operated ABC affiliate WKDH through a similar arrangement from its 2001 sign-on until its final sign-off on August 31, 2012, each station had its own station manager and owner in accordance with FCC policy. WTVA, Inc. also previously owned and operated WTVX in Fort Pierce, Florida, and KTFL in Flagstaff, Arizona. During the majority of the time KTFL was broadcasting, it carried programing from FamilyNet. KTFL's transmitter was licensed as the most powerful television station its own market. On July 30, 1999, WTVA began its digital service on UHF channel 57 but is mapped to virtual channel 9; that service would move to VHF channel 8 on July 24, 2008. By comparison, sister station WLOV broadcast network programming in high definition over a low-power digital transmitter. It is likely the allowable power levels on channel 8, WTVA's post-transition digital channel, will be severely limited due to potential interference to other stations.

Logo used as MeTV affiliate from December 31, 2011, to August 31, 2012.

Previously, FamilyNet was carried on WTVA-DT2 until December 31, 2011, when it was replaced by MeTV. The subchannel again switched affiliations, this time to ABC, on September 1, 2012; the subchannel replaced WKDH as the ABC affiliate for the Columbus–Tupelo–West Point market, which ceased operations the night before on August 31. The MeTV affiliation was moved to sister-station WLOV-DT 27.2.

Heartland Media announced on September 16, 2014, that it would purchase WTVA from the Spain family, ending 57 years of local ownership. Heartland Media assumed control of the station on February 11, 2015. Allen Media Broadcasting, in turn, purchased Heartland in 2020, bringing WTVA into its portfolio.

On June 1, 2025, amid financial woes and rising debt, Allen Media Group announced that it would explore "strategic options" for the company, such as a sale of its television stations (including WTVA). On August 8, 2025, it was announced that AMG would sell 12 of its stations, including WTVA, to Gray Media for $171 million. The sale of WTVA was completed on March 27, 2026, marking Gray's entry into the Columbus–Tupelo market.

== Newscasts ==
In March 2000, WTVA began producing a Sunday through Friday night prime time newscast on WLOV-TV. Last known as WTVA 9 News on WLOV, this broadcast could be seen for an hour on weekdays and half an hour on weekends. That newscast was expanded to seven nights a week on July 1, 2017. WLOV also aired WTVA 9 News on WLOV from 6 to 9 a.m., produced by WTVA that competes with a sixty-minute show seen on The CW affiliate WCBI-DT3. On April 20, 2009, WTVA became the first station in the market and second in the state to upgrade local news to high definition level (WLOV's show was included). Compared nationwide, it was the smallest market outlet that made the change.

With the addition of ABC network programming on WTVA-DT2, the subchannel also airs local news programming as per the terms of its affiliation agreement, featuring simulcasts of most local newscasts seen on the primary channel. More specifically, WTVA's half-hour weekday newscasts at noon and 6 p.m. and its one-hour news and talk program Kay Bain's Saturday Mornin' Show is not seen on WTVA-DT2. WTVA-DT2 does, however, air an exclusive newscast weeknights at 6:30 p.m. The station operates a weather radar at its facilities that is known on-air as "StormTrack Doppler".

WTVA's Weather Authority made national news on April 28, 2014, when chief meteorologist Matt Laubhan frantically ordered his colleagues to the basement as a multi-vortex EF3 tornado came dangerously close to the station. After calling the National Weather Service in Memphis and operating without any radar data for three hours, he later won an Emmy in 2015 for his efforts that night.

On January 17, 2025, Allen Media Group announced plans to cut local meteorologist/weather forecaster positions from its stations, including WTVA, and replacing them with a "weather hub" produced by The Weather Channel, which AMG also owns. Three days later, following complaints from both viewers and local officials, AMG reversed their decision and local weather forecasting would continue.

== Subchannels ==
The station's signal is multiplexed:

Subchannels of WTVA
Subchannel	Res.	Short name	Programming
9.1	1080i	NBC	NBC
9.2	720p	ABC	ABC
9.3	480i	ION	Ion
9.4	480i	Dabl	Dabl
9.5	480i	Antenna	Antenna TV (4:3)
