= Ripley, Mississippi =

- City
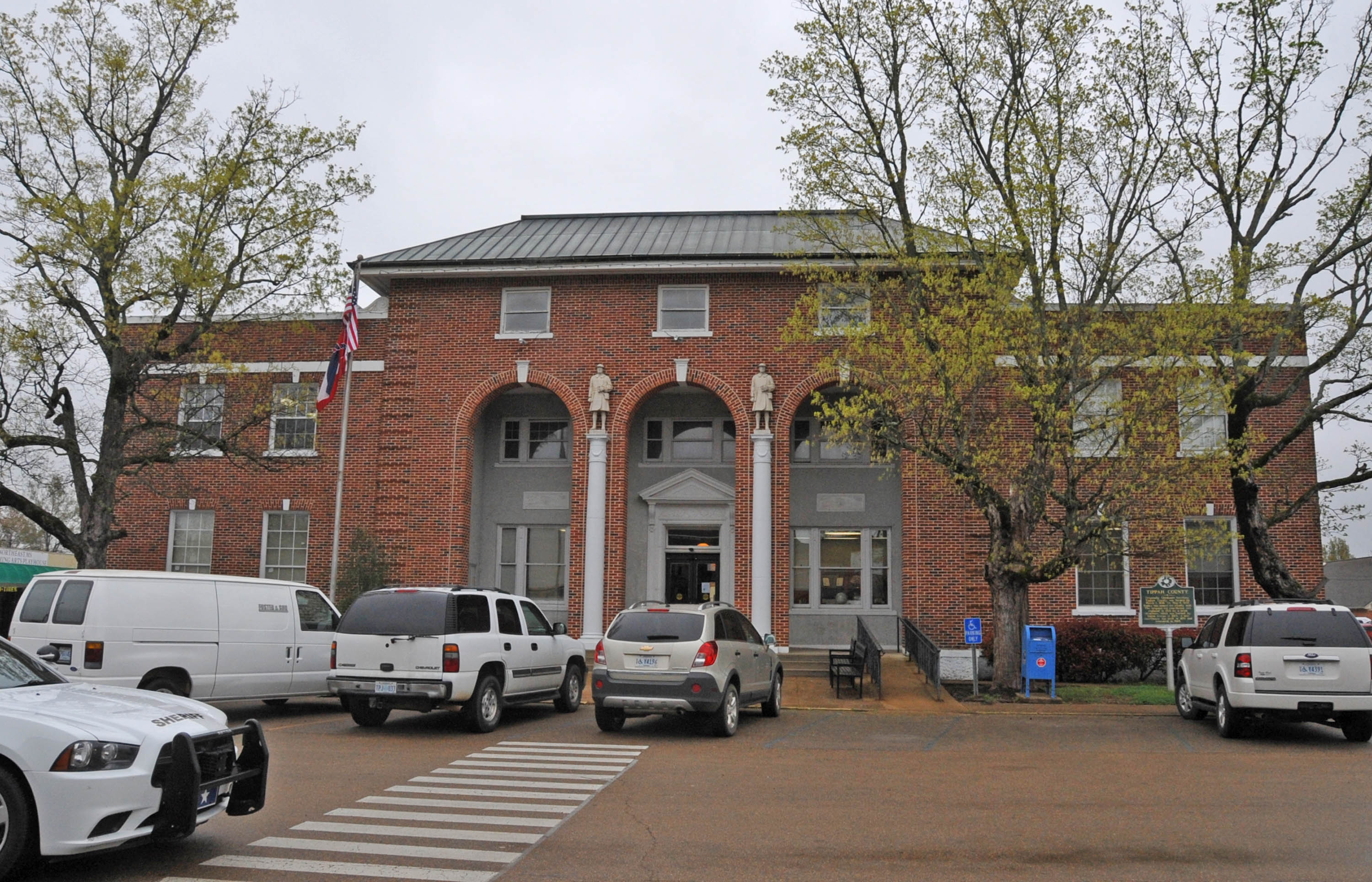
- Tippah County Courthouse

- Flag Seal

- Location of Ripley, Mississippi

- Location in the United States
- Coordinates: 34°43′57″N 88°56′49″W
- Country: United States
- State: Mississippi
- County: Tippah
- Named for: Eleazer W. Ripley

Government
  - Mayor: Jon Grisham (R)

Area
  - Total: 11.46 sq mi (29.67 km^{2})
  - Land: 11.43 sq mi (29.60 km^{2})
  - Water: 0.027 sq mi (0.07 km^{2})
- Elevation: 476 ft (145 m)

Population (2020)
  - Total: 5,462
  - Density: 477.9/sq mi (184.51/km^{2})
- Time zone: UTC-6 (Central (CST))
  - Summer (DST): UTC-5 (CDT)
- ZIP code: 38663
- Area code: 662
- FIPS code: 28-62600
- GNIS feature ID: 2404621
- Website: City website

Ripley is a city in Tippah County, Mississippi, United States. As of the 2020 census, Ripley had a population of 5,462. It is the county seat of Tippah County.

Colonel William Clark Falkner, great-grandfather of authors William Faulkner and John Faulkner, was a prominent resident of Ripley in the mid to late-19th century. W.C. Falkner's exploits in and around Ripley served as the model for Faulkner's character of Colonel John Sartoris.

Ripley is located in the Hills region of North Mississippi, an important region for the birth of American music. The area is known as the birthplace of the hill country blues.

== Geography ==
According to the United States Census Bureau, the city has a total area of 11.5 square miles (30 km^{2}), of which 11.5 square miles (30 km^{2}) is land and 0.04-square-mile (0.10 km^{2}) (0.35%) is water.

=== Climate ===
Climate data for Ripley, Mississippi (1991–2020)
Month	Jan	Feb	Mar	Apr	May	Jun	Jul	Aug	Sep	Oct	Nov	Dec	Year
Mean daily maximum °F (°C)	48.8 (9.3)	53.5 (11.9)	62.2 (16.8)	72.0 (22.2)	79.7 (26.5)	86.5 (30.3)	89.6 (32.0)	89.5 (31.9)	83.5 (28.6)	72.7 (22.6)	61.0 (16.1)	51.9 (11.1)	70.9 (21.6)
Daily mean °F (°C)	39.0 (3.9)	42.7 (5.9)	50.8 (10.4)	59.5 (15.3)	68.3 (20.2)	75.9 (24.4)	79.2 (26.2)	78.4 (25.8)	72.0 (22.2)	60.1 (15.6)	49.2 (9.6)	42.0 (5.6)	59.8 (15.4)
Mean daily minimum °F (°C)	29.1 (−1.6)	31.8 (−0.1)	39.4 (4.1)	47.0 (8.3)	56.9 (13.8)	65.2 (18.4)	68.9 (20.5)	67.3 (19.6)	60.4 (15.8)	47.6 (8.7)	37.5 (3.1)	32.2 (0.1)	48.6 (9.2)
Average precipitation inches (mm)	4.92 (125)	5.34 (136)	5.61 (142)	5.61 (142)	5.46 (139)	4.61 (117)	4.80 (122)	3.01 (76)	3.46 (88)	3.97 (101)	4.40 (112)	6.44 (164)	57.63 (1,464)
Average snowfall inches (cm)	0.6 (1.5)	0.7 (1.8)	0.3 (0.76)	0.0 (0.0)	0.0 (0.0)	0.0 (0.0)	0.0 (0.0)	0.0 (0.0)	0.0 (0.0)	0.0 (0.0)	0.0 (0.0)	0.0 (0.0)	1.6 (4.06)
Source: NOAA

== Demographics ==
Historical population
Census	Pop.	Note	%±
1860	683		—
1870	422		−38.2%
1880	637		50.9%
1890	574		−9.9%
1900	653		13.8%
1910	767		17.5%
1920	856		11.6%
1930	1,468		71.5%
1940	2,011		37.0%
1950	2,383		18.5%
1960	2,668		12.0%
1970	3,482		30.5%
1980	4,271		22.7%
1990	5,371		25.8%
2000	5,478		2.0%
2010	5,395		−1.5%
2020	5,462		1.2%
U.S. Decennial Census

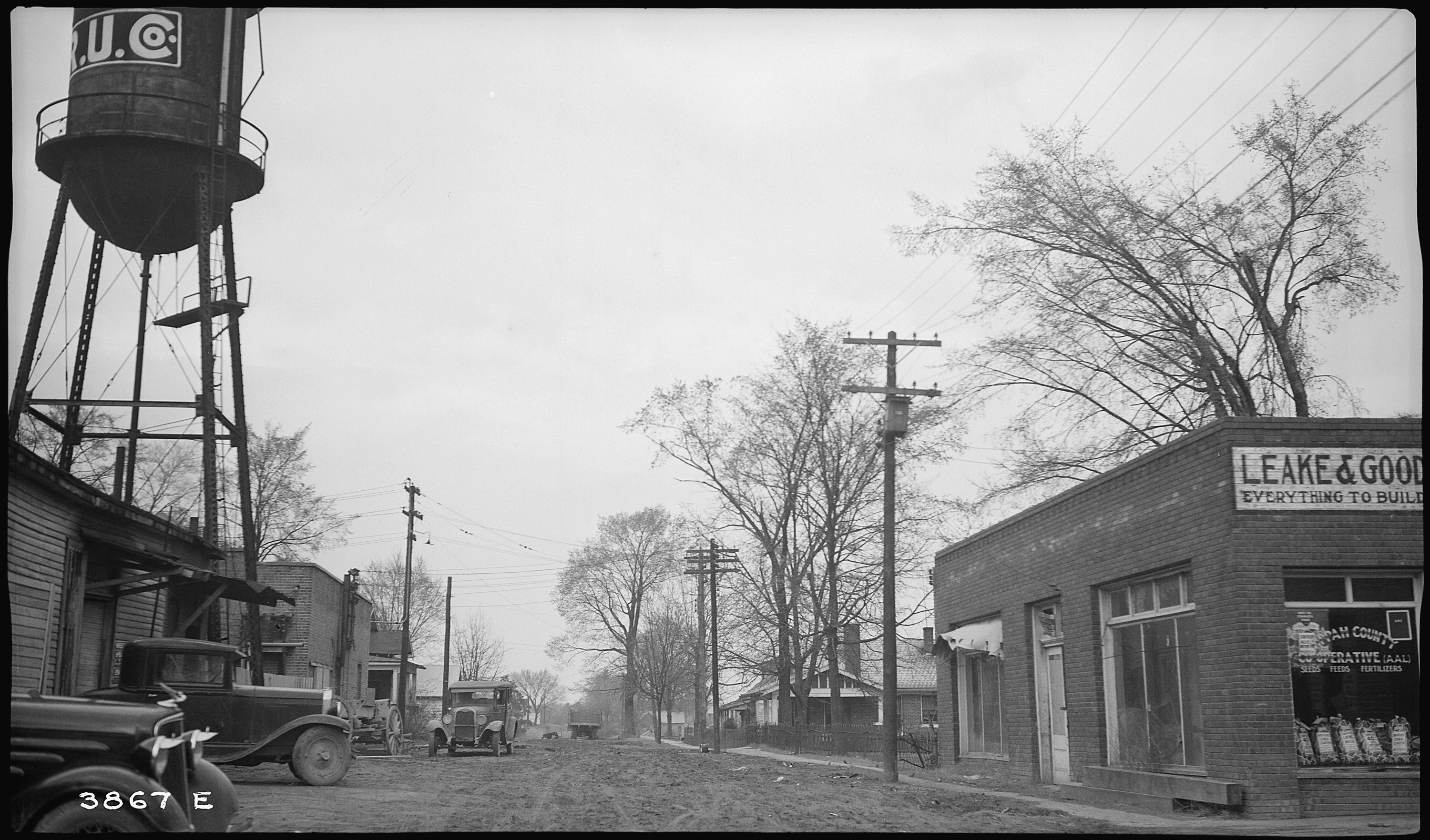
Ripley, (1938)

=== 2020 census ===
As of the 2020 census, Ripley had a population of 5,462. The median age was 40.1 years. 24.4% of residents were under the age of 18 and 21.2% of residents were 65 years of age or older. For every 100 females, there were 87.1 males, and for every 100 females age 18 and over, there were 80.9 males age 18 and over.

0.0% of residents lived in urban areas, while 100.0% lived in rural areas.

There were 2,138 households in Ripley, including 1,100 family households, of which 32.5% had children under the age of 18 living in them. Of all households, 41.2% were married-couple households, 18.0% were households with a male householder and no spouse or partner present, and 36.1% were households with a female householder and no spouse or partner present. About 32.1% of all households were made up of individuals, and 15.0% had someone living alone who was 65 years of age or older.

There were 2,367 housing units, of which 9.7% were vacant. The homeowner vacancy rate was 1.8%, and the rental vacancy rate was 6.7%.

Racial composition as of the 2020 census
Race	Number	Percent
White	3,241	59.3%
Black or African American	1,493	27.3%
American Indian and Alaska Native	19	0.3%
Asian	10	0.2%
Native Hawaiian and Other Pacific Islander	0	0.0%
Some other race	427	7.8%
Two or more races	272	5.0%
Hispanic or Latino (of any race)	644	11.8%

=== 2000 census ===
As of the census of 2000, there were 5,478 people, 2,174 households, and 1,441 families residing in the city. The population density was 476.8 inhabitants per square mile (184.1/km^{2}). There were 2,334 housing units at an average density of 203.1 per square mile (78.4/km^{2}). The racial makeup of the city was 75.65% White, 19.90% African American, 0.22% Native American, 0.20% Asian, 0.02% Pacific Islander, 3.34% from other races, and 0.68% from two or more races. Hispanic or Latino of any race were 4.91% of the population.

There were 2,174 households, out of which 32.0% had children under the age of 18 living with them, 47.0% were married couples living together, 15.2% had a female householder with no husband present, and 33.7% were non-families. 30.5% of all households were made up of individuals, and 14.4% had someone living alone who was 65 years of age or older. The average household size was 2.41 and the average family size was 2.99.

In the city, the population was spread out, with 24.5% under the age of 18, 10.7% from 18 to 24, 26.4% from 25 to 44, 20.4% from 45 to 64, and 18.0% who were 65 years of age or older. The median age was 36 years. For every 100 females, there were 84.9 males. For every 100 females age 18 and over, there were 81.3 males.

The median income for a household in the city was $25,728, and the median income for a family was $31,174. Males had a median income of $26,275 versus $20,160 for females. The per capita income for the city was $12,979. About 18.3% of families and 21.0% of the population were below the poverty line, including 26.7% of those under age 18 and 21.9% of those age 65 or over.

== Education ==
The City of Ripley is served by the South Tippah School District. The Ripley school system includes Ripley Elementary School, Ripley Middle School and Ripley High School.

== Culture ==
=== Historic district ===
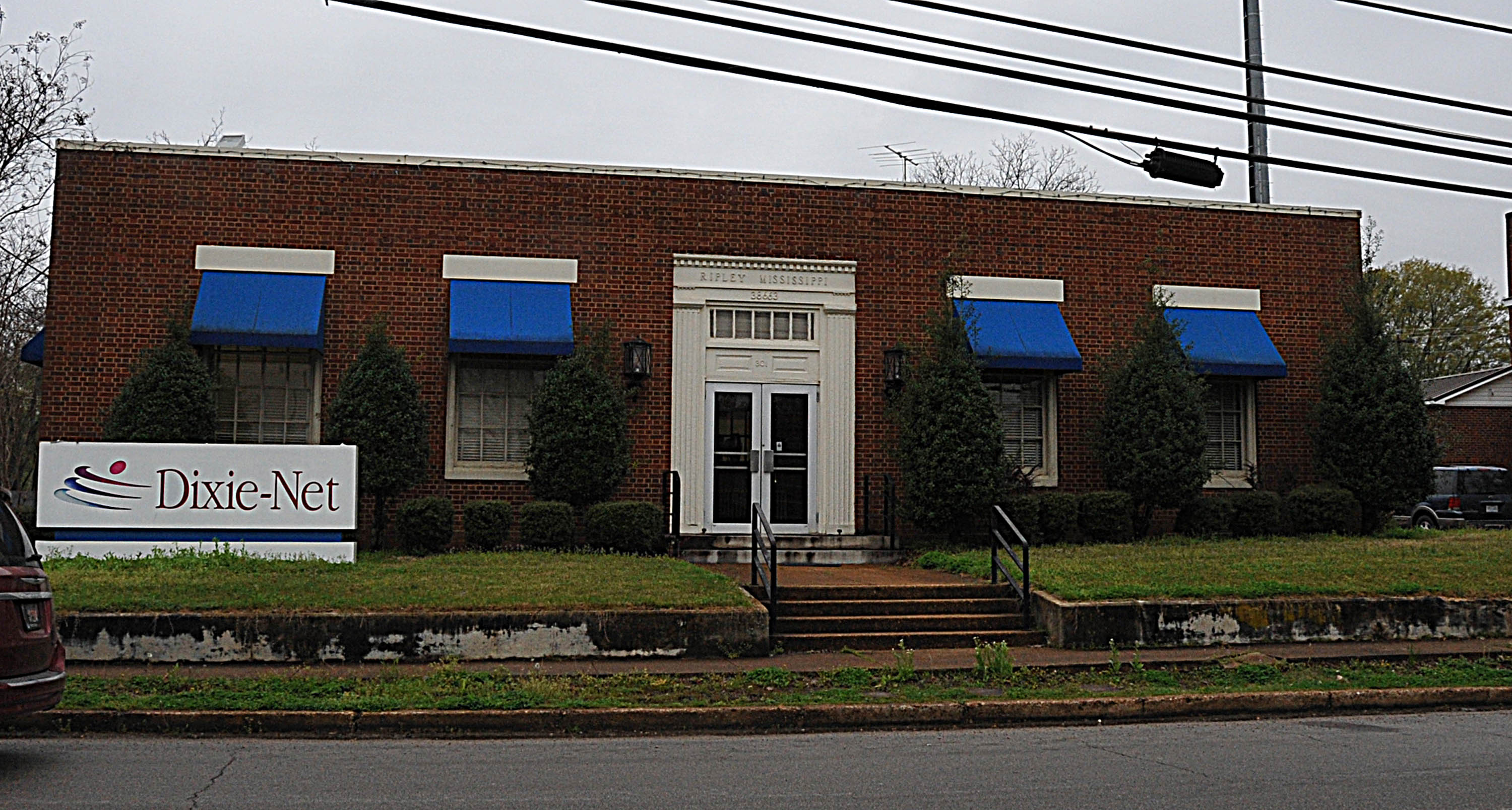
The old Ripley Post Office, part of the historic district, is also listed separately on the National Register of Historic Places

The Ripley Historic District in central Ripley is listed on the National Register of Historic Places.

=== First Monday Trade Day ===
Ripley is the home of the First Monday Trade Day held the weekend prior to the first Monday of every month. It is one of the oldest outdoor flea markets in the United States. It started around the turn of the 20th century at the old square but is now held south of Ripley along Highway 15 across from the Tippah County Fair Grounds. It has seen publicity by various news channels over the years for its tolerance of a controversial live animal market housed at the back edge of the trading grounds.

=== William Faulkner Festival ===
There is an annual walking tour of historic William Faulkner sites during Ripley's annual Faulkner Festival in early November. But it is not celebrated widely throughout Ripley.

== Notable people ==
- John Grisham: author who attended Ripley Elementary School
- Jim Miller: American football punter
- Carroll Roberson: Award-winning gospel music artist resides in Ripley
- Kendall Simmons: offensive lineman for the Pittsburgh Steelers
- Robert Bruce Smith, IV: Northeast Mississippi Daily Journal columnist
- Thomas Spight: U.S. Representative
- Lee Yancey: State Senator
