= Old U.S. Post Office (Ripley, Mississippi) =

- US Post Office, Old--Ripley
- U.S. National Register of Historic Places
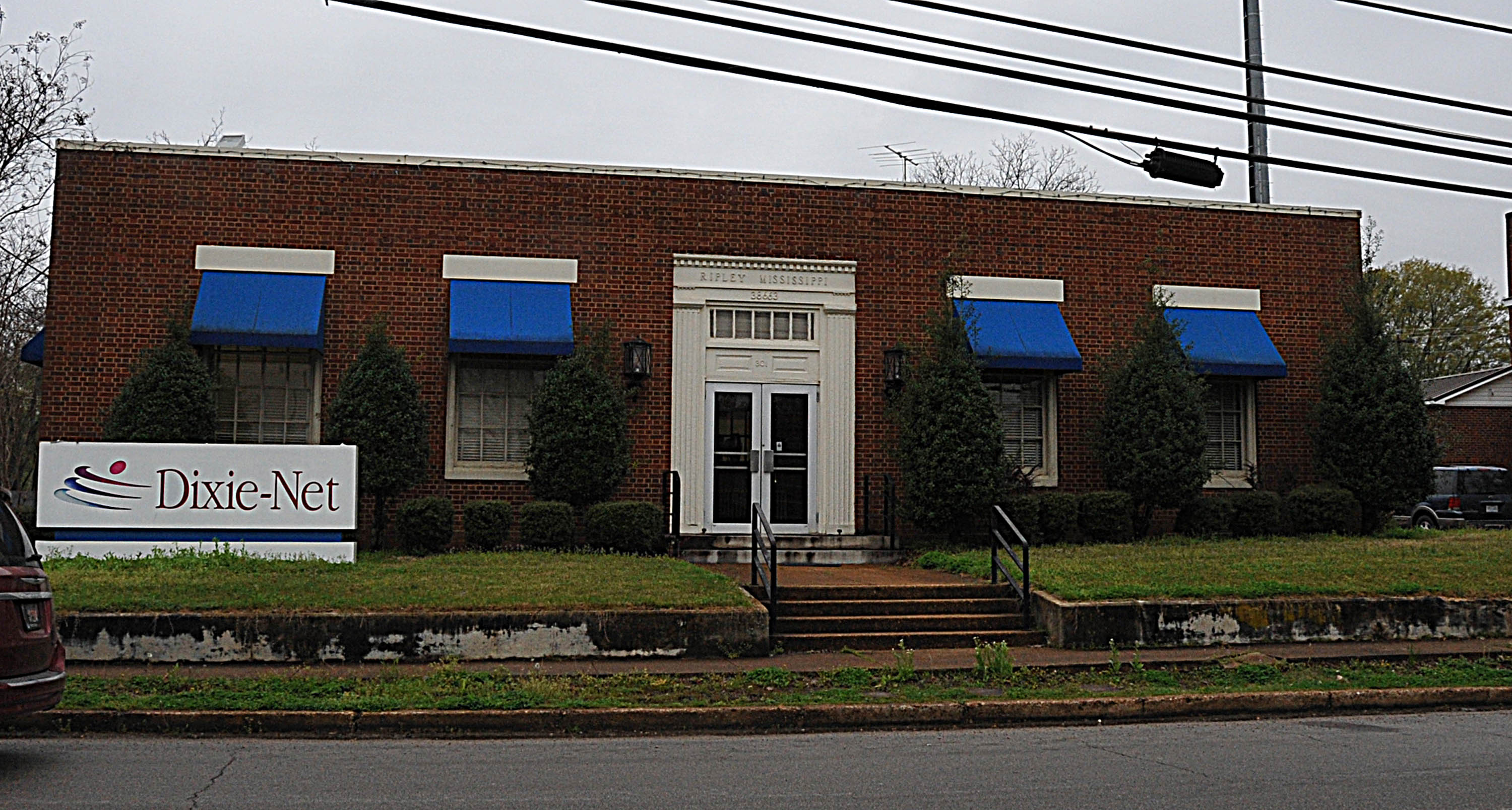
- Photo in 2008

- Location within Mississippi Location within the United States
- Location: 301 N. Main St., Ripley, Mississippi
- Coordinates: 34.731667°N 88.949444°W
- Area: less than one acre
- Built: 1938
- Architect: Algernon Blair
- Architectural style: Colonial Revival
- MPS: Mississippi Post Offices 1931-1941 TR
- NRHP reference No.: 00001056
- Added to NRHP: September 8, 2000

The Old U.S. Post Office in Ripley, Mississippi was built in 1938. It served as a post office until c. 2000. It was listed on the National Register of Historic Places in 2000.

It is a vernacular brick building with brick laid in English bond. Its front central doorway is flanked by wooden pilasters and has a seven-light transom. Its front windows are 8 over 12 sash windows, with limestone lintels and sills.
