= Truth & Salvage Co. (album) =

Studio album by Truth & Salvage Co.
- Released: May 25, 2010
- Recorded: Fall 2009
- Genre: Rock
- Length: 46:07
- Label: Silver Arrow
- Producer: Chris Robinson

Truth & Salvage Co. is the 2010 debut album by rock band Truth & Salvage Co. It features the single, "Call Back."

== Reception ==
Professional ratings
Review scores
Source	Rating
AllMusic	3.5/5 stars
American Music Channel	4/5 stars
Popdose	4/5 stars
Roughstock	3.5/5 stars
Glide Magazine	4.5/5 stars
Paste Magazine	4/5 stars
Blurt Online	4.5/5 stars
This Is Modern Online	4/5 stars

The initial critical reception of the Truth & Salvage Co. was mostly positive, though sales were slow to build. The band garnered a considerable amount of early interest in their debut by performing in the opening slot for producer Chris Robinson's band The Black Crowes on their 2009 tour of the United States.

== Track listing ==
No.	Title	Writer(s)	Length
1.	"Hail Hail"	Young/Jones/Smith/Kinnebrew	3:46
2.	"Call Back"	Young/Jones/Smith/Kinnebrew	3:10
3.	"Welcome to L.A."	Young/Jones/Smith/Kinnebrew	3:55
4.	"Heart Like a Wheel"	Young/Jones/Smith/Kinnebrew	3:12
5.	"See Her"	Young/Jones/Smith/Kinnebrew	3:34
6.	"Old Piano"	Perry/Jones/Wright	4:45
7.	"101"	Young/Jones/Smith/Kinnebrew	3:18
8.	"Jump the Ship"	Young/Jones/Smith/Kinnebrew	3:41
9.	"She Really Does It for Me"	Young/Jones/Smith/Kinnebrew	3:20
10.	"Rise Up"	Young/Jones/Smith/Kinnebrew	4:39
11.	"Brothers, Sons & Daughters"	Young/Jones/Smith/Kinnebrew	4:22
12.	"Pure Mountain Angel"	Young/Jones/Smith/Kinnebrew	4:35

=== Additional tracks ===
No.	Title	Writer(s)	Length
13.	"Them Jeans"	Young/Jones/Smith/Kinnebrew	3:10

"Them Jeans" was released as an exclusive iTunes bonus track along with the original album on May 25, 2010.

== Personnel ==
- Bill "Smitty" Smith: Vocals, drums
- Scott Kinnebrew: Vocals, guitars, lap steel
- Tim Jones: Vocals, guitars
- Walker Young: Vocals, piano, B-3 organ
- Adam Grace: B-3 organ, piano, mellotron, wurlitzer
- Joe Edel: bass
- Luther Dickinson: guitar on "Pure Mountain Angel"
- George Stanford: guitar on "She Really Does It For Me"
- Franky Perez: guitar on "Call Back" and "Brothers, Sons & Daughters"
- Brian Wright: contributions on "Old Piano"
- Katy Perry: vocals, guitar on "Old Piano"

== Additional credits ==
- Produced by: Chris Robinson
- "See Her" and "Rise Up" produced by: Paul Stacey
- "Hail Hail" produced by: Paul Stacey & Chris Robinson
- Engineered by: Beau Raymond & John Hanlon
- Assistant engineer: Bill Mims
- Mixed by: Paul Stacey at Strangeways Studio, London
- Assistant mixer: Ben Hampson
- Mastered by: John Paterno
- Recorded at: Stagg Street Studios, Kingsize Soundlabs and Sunset Sound, Los Angeles CA
- Management: Pete Angelus - Angelus Entertainment
- Album art & design: Katie Crawford
- Photography: Matt Mendenhall, Craig Gorkiewicz, Jonathan Dubuque
