= Frank K. Spain =

Frank Kyle Spain (November 29, 1927 – April 25, 2006) was an American inventor and television engineer. He is best known for founding and building WTVA, an NBC affiliate in Tupelo, Mississippi.

In his later life, Spain also owned and operated other stations and a microwave service company. He was also a principal investor of MCI Southeast.

== Early life ==
Spain was born in North Lewisburg, Ohio. He spent most of his youth in Tupelo. Even early in his life, Spain took great fascination with the way electronics worked. While still a high school student, he helped build and operate a local AM radio station, WELO. Spain also served as the chief engineer on a part-time basis. After graduating with honors from Mississippi State University at the age of 19, Spain took his electrical engineering degree and ventured to Washington, D.C.

== Career ==
Shortly after being employed by NBC, Spain assisted in the construction of WNBW (now WRC-TV). He helped with the first live television feeds which originated from the Capitol, White House, and other various historic locations, including the 1949 presidential inauguration.

In 1949, Spain joined the NBC Development Group in New York City to design television and microwave relay equipment.

Spain explains the development group here in a 2000 interview:

"In those days, at least in the case of NBC and CBS, they had design and development groups who were basically manufacturing their own cameras and equipment and whatever. And then RCA and General Electric would take these designs and modify them somewhat and sell them commercially. So, the projects we were working on were very shortly thereafter [evolved into] color television."

While there, he also helped build the first UHF television station in Bridgeport, Connecticut, and supervised the pattern measurements of the station's antenna.

== New standard ==
With technology rapidly changing the scope of television in 1950, the decision was made by the Federal Communications Commission to adopt a color standard for all broadcast television networks. Spain participated in the 1949–1950 demonstration of the RCA-compatible color television system. Though the FCC initially dropped RCA's system, a rehearing was held two years later and RCA's all-electronic system was adopted.

Two years later, Spain left NBC to take an engineering director position at WHEN-AM-FM-TV in Syracuse, New York.

== Origins of WTWV ==
While working in Syracuse, Spain hoped to build a station in Tupelo. In December 1953, Spain successfully petitioned the FCC to allocate channel 9 to Tupelo, and was granted a construction permit three years later. The station first went on the air on March 18, 1957. The station's equipment—antenna, transmitter, cameras, etc.--had been hand-built by Spain.

Though many NBC executives believed Tupelo was not a desirable place for a local affiliate station because of its rural location, they told Spain that if he could figure out a way to obtain a network signal, he could carry it. After several under-the-table deals with WMC-TV in Memphis, Spain set up a network of microwave relays and repeater systems to carry the WMC-TV signal to Tupelo. WTWV became an official NBC affiliate sometime in the mid-1960s. WTWV changed its call letters to WTVA in 1979.

== Microwave Service Company ==
In 1959, Spain started Microwave Service Company to provide distant signals to CATV systems and network interconnects for broadcast facilities. At the peak of his terrestrial transmission business, the company served twelve states.

Because of the strategic location of these facilities, Spain joined Jack Goeken and Bill McGowan in the start-up of MCI. He maintained a sole ownership in MCI Mid-South and an equal partnership with the Meredith Corporation in MCI Southeast.

== Later years ==
Spain began a fascination with antique cars after buying his first in 1974. Spain founded the Tupelo Automobile Museum which housed all of Spain's 150-car collection. The museum, founded by Spain, opened in 2002 and was designated as the official state automobile museum in 2003. The museum closed in 2019 and the vehicles were auctioned off.

Spain was known internationally in broadcast circles and was awarded the Gold Circle Emmy Award in 2005 for 50 years' Lifetime Achievement in Broadcasting.

Though his health declined after the turn of the millennium, Spain continued to visit WTVA almost daily until his death. Known to many of his employees as a true hands-on owner, Spain often bragged that he could "take the Channel 9 staff anywhere in the world and they would be second to none". Of all the accomplishments Spain had overseen, WTVA was his crown jewel.

Spain died at North Mississippi Medical Center in Tupelo on April 25, 2006, after a long battle with cancer. His family sold WTVA in 2015.
