= Northeast Mississippi Daily Journal =

Daily newspaper in Tupelo, Mississippi, United States

- Type: Daily newspaper
- Format: Broadsheet
- Owner(s): Journal, Inc.
- Publisher: William Bronson III
- Editor: Sam R. Hall
- Founded: 1872
- Headquarters: 1242 South Green St. Tupelo, MS 38804, United States
- Circulation: 13,000 daily
- ISSN: 0744-5431
- OCLC number: 60617022
- Website: djournal.com

The Northeast Mississippi Daily Journal is the largest daily newspaper in northeast Mississippi, United States. It was first published in 1872. It is based in Tupelo, Mississippi, and owned by Journal, Inc. (formerly known as Journal Publishing Company, Inc.) which also owns eight weekly community newspapers such as The Itawamba County Times, the Pontotoc Progress, the Southern Sentinel, the Chickasaw Journal and the New Albany News-Exchange.
