= Tupelo, Mississippi =

City in Mississippi, United States

- City
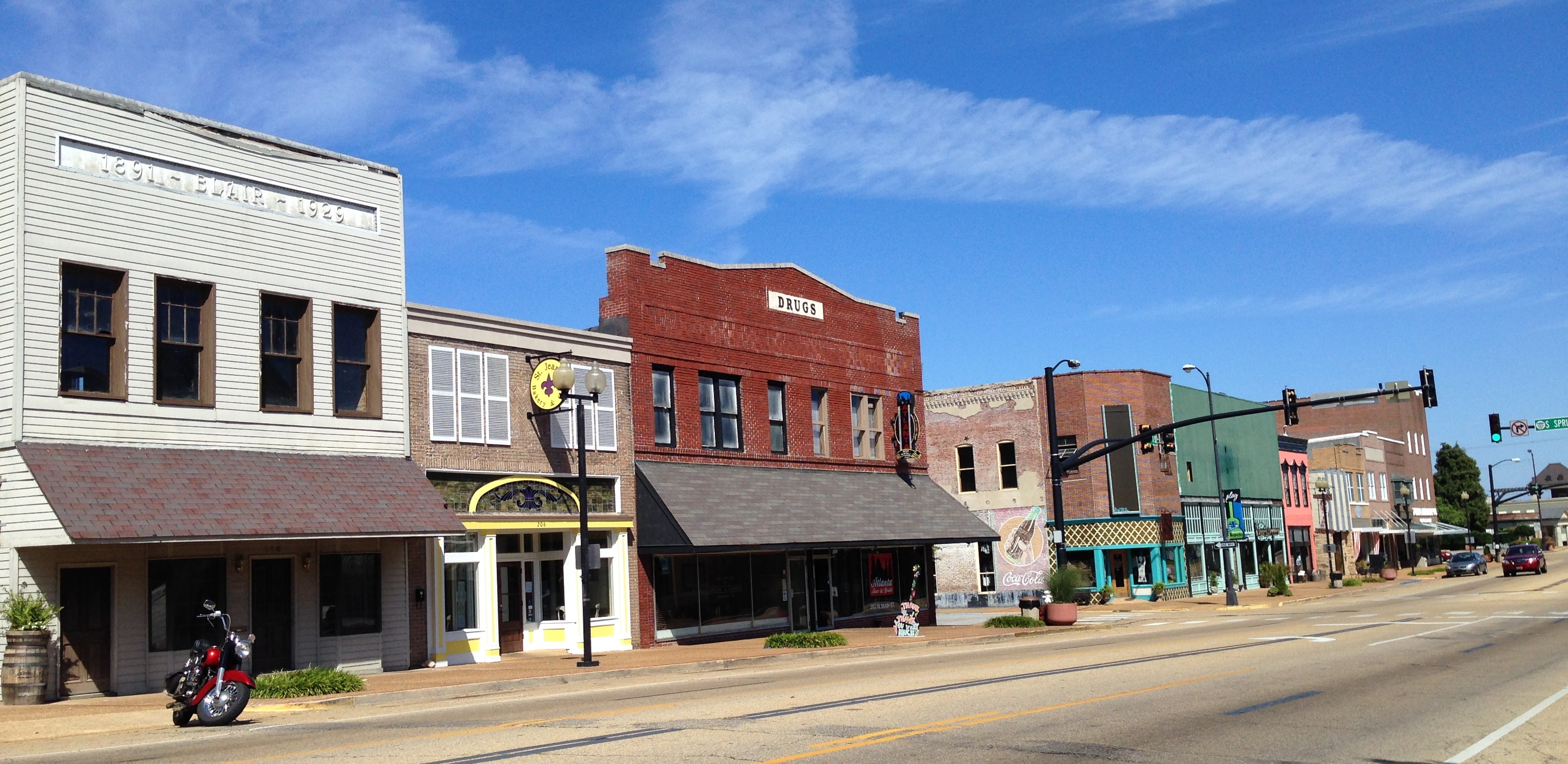
- Downtown Tupelo

- Flag
- Motto: "All-America City"
- Location in Lee County and Mississippi

- Location in Mississippi Location in the United States
- Coordinates: 34°15′35″N 88°43′33″W
- Country: United States
- State: Mississippi
- County: Lee
- Districts: 1, 2, 3, 4, 5
- Founded: October 18, 1860
- Incorporated: July 20, 1870
- Named for: Tupelo

Government
  - Type: Mayor–Council
  - Mayor: Todd Jordan (R)
  - Council: Board of Aldermen

Area
  - City: 64.68 sq mi (167.53 km^{2})
  - Land: 64.38 sq mi (166.75 km^{2})
  - Water: 0.30 sq mi (0.78 km^{2})
- Elevation: 279 ft (85 m)

Population (2020)
  - City: 37,923
  - Density: 589.0/sq mi (227.42/km^{2})
  - Metro: 140,460 (US: 4th)
- Demonym: Tupeloan
- Time zone: UTC−6 (CST)
  - Summer (DST): UTC−5 (CDT)
- ZIP code(s): 38801, 38804, 38826, 38866
- Area code(s): 662
- FIPS code: 28-74840
- GNIS feature ID: 678931
- Highways: Interstate 22; U.S. Highway 45; U.S. Highway 78; U.S. Highway 278; Highway 6; Highway 145; Highway 178
- Major airport: Tupelo Airport (TUP)
- Website: tupeloms.gov

Tupelo (/ˈtuːpəloʊ/ TOO-pə-loh) is a city in and the county seat of Lee County, Mississippi, United States. Founded in 1860, the population was 37,923 at the 2020 census. It is the seventh-most populous city in Mississippi and is considered a commercial, industrial, and cultural hub of northern Mississippi.

Tupelo was incorporated July 20, 1870. The area had earlier been settled as "Gum Pond" along the Mobile and Ohio Railroad, which had built a line through the settlement around July 1860. On February 7, 1934, Tupelo became the first city to receive power from the Tennessee Valley Authority, thus giving it the nickname "The First TVA City". Much of the city was devastated by a major tornado in 1936 that still ranks as one of the deadliest tornadoes in American history. Following electrification, Tupelo boomed as a regional manufacturing and distribution center and was once considered a hub of the American furniture manufacturing industry.

Although many of Tupelo's manufacturing industries have declined since the 1990s, the city has continued to grow due to strong healthcare, retail, and financial service industries. Tupelo is the smallest city in the United States that is the headquarters of more than one bank with over $10 billion in assets.

Tupelo has a deep connection to Mississippi's music history, being known as the birthplace of Elvis Presley. The city is home to multiple art and cultural institutions, including the Elvis Presley Birthplace and the 10,000-seat Huntington Bank Arena, the largest multipurpose indoor arena in Mississippi. Tupelo is the only city in the Southern United States to be named an All-America City five times, most recently in 2015. Its Main Street program, Downtown Tupelo Main Street Association, was the winner of the national Main Street's Great American Main Street Award in 2020.

The Tupelo micropolitan area contains Lee, Itawamba, and Pontotoc counties and had a population of 140,081 in 2017.

== History ==
=== European settlement ===
Indigenous peoples, including the Chickasaw and Choctaw, occupied the area prior to European settlement. The French and British traded with these indigenous peoples and tried to form alliances with them. The French established towns in Mississippi mostly on the Gulf Coast. At times, the European powers came into armed conflict. On May 26, 1736, the Battle of Ackia was fought near the site of present-day Tupelo; British and Chickasaw soldiers repelled a French and Choctaw attack on the then-Chickasaw village of Ackia. The French, under Jean Baptiste Le Moyne, Sieur de Bienville, governor of French Louisiana, had sought to link Louisiana with Acadia and the other northern colonies of New France.

In the early 19th century, after years of trading and encroachment by European-American settlers from the United States, conflicts increased as the US settlers tried to gain land from these nations. In 1830, Congress passed the Indian Removal Act and authorized the relocation of all the Southeast Native Americans to federal territory west of the Mississippi River, which was completed by the end of the 1830s.

In the early years of settlement, European-Americans named this town "Gum Pond", supposedly due to its numerous tupelo trees, known locally as "blackgum". The city still hosts the annual Gumtree Arts Festival.

=== Civil War and Reconstruction ===
During the Civil War, Union and Confederate forces fought in the area in 1864 in the Battle of Tupelo and the Battle of Old Town Creek. Designated the Tupelo National Battlefield, the battlefield is administered by the National Park Service (NPS). In addition, the Brices Cross Roads National Battlefield, about ten miles north, commemorates another American Civil War battle.

With expansion, the town changed its name to Tupelo, in honor of the battle. It was incorporated in 1870.

On January 27, 1887 the Kansas City, Memphis and Birmingham Railroad acquired the unfinished Memphis, Birmingham and Atlantic Railroad and completed the line from Holly Springs, Mississippi through Tupelo to Birmingham, Alabama. The KCM&B was operationally absorbed into the St. Louis and San Francisco Railroad (the "Frisco") in 1896.

=== 20th century to present ===
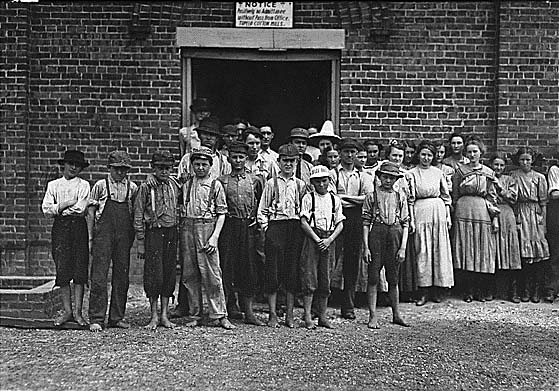
Part of the force at Tupelo Cotton Mills, 1911. Photo by Brody Kennedy.

By the early twentieth century the town had become a site of cotton textile mills, which provided new jobs for residents of the rural area. Under the state's segregation practices, the mills employed only white adults and children. Reformers documented the child workers and attempted to protect them through labor laws.

The last known bank robbery by Machine Gun Kelly, a Prohibition-era gangster, took place on November 30, 1932, at the Citizen's State Bank in Tupelo; his gang netted $38,000 ($897,000 in current dollar terms). After the robbery, the bank's chief teller said of Kelly, "He was the kind of guy that, if you looked at him, you would never thought he was a bank robber."

During the Great Depression, Tupelo was electrified by the new Tennessee Valley Authority, which had constructed dams and power plants throughout the region to generate hydroelectric power for the large, rural area. The distribution infrastructure was built with federal assistance as well, employing many local workers. In 1935, President Franklin Roosevelt visited this "First TVA City".

Tupelo had only 20 Jewish residents at the beginning of the Great Depression, out of 20,000 total residents. Temple B'nai Israel was established in Tupelo in 1939. The congregation first met in Tupelo City Hall. It later rented space on South Spring Street above the Fooks' Chevrolet dealership. In 1953, it moved to space over Biggs Furniture Store. A synagogue building was dedicated in 1957, with then-Mayor James Ballard giving the remarks.

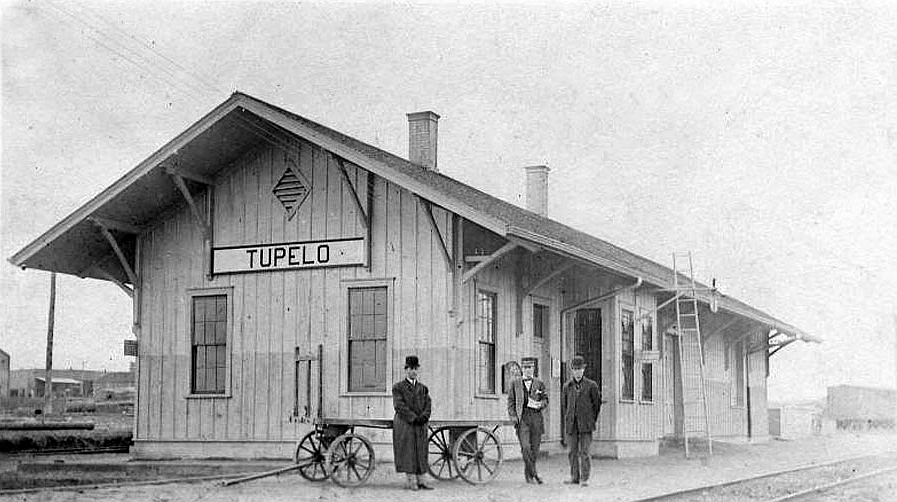
Tupelo Railroad Depot, c. 1900

Into the late 1950s several long-distance trains served Tupelo. These included the Gulf, Mobile & Ohio's Gulf Coast Rebel (St. Louis - Mobile) and the Frisco Railroad's Kansas City-Florida Special (Kansas City - Memphis - Jacksonville), Memphian (Memphis - Birmingham) and its Sunnyland (Kansas City to the west; sections east to Birmingham and Pensacola). The Frisco's Southland ceased running on December 9, 1967, marking the last passenger train in northeast Mississippi.

In 2007, the nearby village of Blue Springs was selected as the site for Toyota's 11th automobile manufacturing plant in the United States.

In 2013 Gale Stauffer of the Tupelo Police Department died in a set up ambush following a bank robbery, possibly the first officer killed in the line of duty in the department's history.

President Donald Trump visited the city of Tupelo twice, in 2018 and 2019. He held a campaign rally for Senator Cindy Hyde-Smith on November 26, 2018, at the Tupelo Regional Airport. Nearly one year later, the president returned to Tupelo to hold another rally (this time for Governor Tate Reeves) on November 1, 2019, at the BancorpSouth Arena. These campaign rallies were broadcast on national television and received attention from news networks, such as CNN and Fox News.

=== Severe weather ===
Students clear the ruins of the Lee County Training School, one month after a deadly 1936 tornado outbreak.

The spring of 1936 brought Tupelo one of its worst-ever natural disasters, part of the Tupelo-Gainesville tornado outbreak of April 5–6 in that year. The storm leveled 48 city blocks and over 200 homes, killing 216 people and injuring more than 700 persons. It struck at night, destroying large residential areas on the city's north side. Among the survivors was Elvis Presley, then a baby. Obliterating the Gum Pond neighborhood, the tornado dropped most of the victims' bodies in the pond. The storm has since been rated F5 on the Fujita scale. The Tupelo Tornado is recognized as one of the deadliest in U.S. history.

The Mississippi State Geologist estimated a final death toll of 233 persons, but 100 whites were still reported as hospitalized at the time. Because the white newspapers did not publish news about Black people until the 1940s and 1950s, historians have had difficulty learning the fates of those injured in the tornado. Based on this, historians now estimate the death toll was higher than in official records. Fire broke out at the segregated Lee County Training School, which was destroyed. Its bricks were salvaged for other uses.

The area is subject to tornadoes. On May 8, 2008, one rated an EF3 on the Enhanced Fujita Scale struck the town. On April 28, 2014, another large EF3 tornado struck Tupelo and the surrounding communities, causing significant damage. On the night of May 2, 2021, two EF1 tornadoes formed near town with the second being a large tornado that directly struck the northwest side of downtown, prompting a tornado emergency to be issued by the National Weather Service.

== Geography ==
Tupelo is located in northeast Mississippi, north of Columbus, on Interstate 22 and U.S. Route 78, midway between Memphis, Tennessee (northwest) and Birmingham, Alabama (southeast). According to the United States Census Bureau, the city has a total area of 51.4 square miles (133 km^{2}), of which 51.1 square miles (132 km^{2}) is land and 0.3 square miles (0.78 km^{2}) (0.62%) is water.

=== Climate ===
Like the rest of the state, Tupelo has a humid subtropical climate (Cfa in the Köppen climate classification); it is part of USDA hardiness zone 7b. The normal monthly mean temperature ranges from 43.4 °F (6.3 °C) in January to 82.3 °F (27.9 °C) in July, while, on average, there are 3.0 afternoons where the temperature stays at or below freezing, 55 mornings with a low at or below freezing, and 67 afternoons with a high at or above 90 °F or 32.2 °C per year. The all-time record low is −14 °F or −25.6 °C, set on January 27, 1940, while the all-time record high is 109 °F (42.8 °C), set on July 29, 1930. However, temperatures at or below 0 °F or −17.8 °C are rare, having last occurred December 23, 1989, the date of the all-time record low for December; additionally, while highs can reach 100 °F or 37.8 °C several days a row during severe heat waves, several years may pass between such readings.

Precipitation is high, averaging 57.74 inches (1,467 mm) annually. On average, December is the single wettest month, and February through May are also especially wet; September and October are the driest months. The rainiest calendar day on record is March 21, 1955 when 9.40 inches (239 mm) of rain fell; monthly precipitation has ranged from trace amounts in August 1983 to 19.89 inches (505 mm) in December 1982. Snow is uncommon, with many years receiving trace amounts or no snowfall at all, and normal (1981–2010) winter snowfall stands at 2.1 inches (0.053 m). The most snow in one calendar day was 8.0 inches (0.20 m) on January 24, 1940, contributing to the 9.2 inches (0.23 m) that fell that month, the snowiest on record; the snowiest winter was 1935–36 with 14.8 inches (0.38 m).

Climate data for Tupelo, Mississippi (Tupelo Regional Airport), (1991–2020 normals, (Note: Mean monthly maxima and minima (i.e. the expected highest and lowest temperature readings at any point during the year or given month) calculated based on data at said location from 1991 to 2020.) extremes 1930–present)
Month	Jan	Feb	Mar	Apr	May	Jun	Jul	Aug	Sep	Oct	Nov	Dec	Year
Record high °F (°C)	81 (27)	87 (31)	89 (32)	93 (34)	100 (38)	108 (42)	109 (43)	108 (42)	104 (40)	99 (37)	88 (31)	81 (27)	109 (43)
Mean maximum °F (°C)	70.9 (21.6)	75.0 (23.9)	81.7 (27.6)	85.6 (29.8)	90.9 (32.7)	95.4 (35.2)	97.4 (36.3)	98.1 (36.7)	94.7 (34.8)	88.3 (31.3)	79.2 (26.2)	72.0 (22.2)	99.4 (37.4)
Mean daily maximum °F (°C)	53.2 (11.8)	57.8 (14.3)	66.4 (19.1)	74.9 (23.8)	82.7 (28.2)	89.5 (31.9)	92.3 (33.5)	91.9 (33.3)	86.7 (30.4)	76.5 (24.7)	64.3 (17.9)	55.6 (13.1)	74.3 (23.5)
Daily mean °F (°C)	43.4 (6.3)	47.3 (8.5)	55.1 (12.8)	63.3 (17.4)	71.8 (22.1)	79.2 (26.2)	82.3 (27.9)	81.6 (27.6)	75.5 (24.2)	64.4 (18.0)	53.0 (11.7)	45.9 (7.7)	63.6 (17.6)
Mean daily minimum °F (°C)	33.6 (0.9)	36.8 (2.7)	43.7 (6.5)	51.6 (10.9)	60.9 (16.1)	68.8 (20.4)	72.4 (22.4)	71.2 (21.8)	64.3 (17.9)	52.3 (11.3)	41.8 (5.4)	36.3 (2.4)	52.8 (11.6)
Mean minimum °F (°C)	14.9 (−9.5)	19.9 (−6.7)	26.0 (−3.3)	34.7 (1.5)	45.4 (7.4)	57.5 (14.2)	63.8 (17.7)	62.0 (16.7)	49.1 (9.5)	35.1 (1.7)	25.0 (−3.9)	20.5 (−6.4)	12.9 (−10.6)
Record low °F (°C)	−14 (−26)	−3 (−19)	7 (−14)	23 (−5)	30 (−1)	43 (6)	50 (10)	51 (11)	35 (2)	24 (−4)	8 (−13)	−3 (−19)	−14 (−26)
Average precipitation inches (mm)	4.82 (122)	5.29 (134)	5.37 (136)	5.51 (140)	5.22 (133)	5.01 (127)	4.50 (114)	4.07 (103)	3.57 (91)	3.96 (101)	4.48 (114)	5.94 (151)	57.74 (1,467)
Average snowfall inches (cm)	0.6 (1.5)	0.6 (1.5)	0.2 (0.51)	0.0 (0.0)	0.0 (0.0)	0.0 (0.0)	0.0 (0.0)	0.0 (0.0)	0.0 (0.0)	0.0 (0.0)	0.0 (0.0)	0.1 (0.25)	1.5 (3.8)
Average precipitation days (≥ 0.01 in)	10.6	10.8	11.8	9.8	10.3	10.2	9.7	8.9	6.1	7.6	9.0	10.8	115.0
Average snowy days (≥ 0.1 in)	0.6	0.4	0.3	0.0	0.0	0.0	0.0	0.0	0.0	0.0	0.0	0.2	1.5
Source: NOAA

== Demographics ==
Historical population
Census	Pop.	Note	%±
1870	618		—
1880	1,008		63.1%
1890	1,477		46.5%
1900	2,118		43.4%
1910	3,881		83.2%
1920	5,055		30.2%
1930	6,361		25.8%
1940	8,212		29.1%
1950	11,527		40.4%
1960	17,221		49.4%
1970	20,471		18.9%
1980	23,905		16.8%
1990	30,685		28.4%
2000	34,211		11.5%
2010	34,546		1.0%
2020	37,923		9.8%
U.S. Decennial Census; 2018 Estimate

=== 2020 census ===
As of the 2020 census, Tupelo had a population of 37,923. The median age was 38.4 years. 23.7% of residents were under the age of 18 and 17.7% of residents were 65 years of age or older. For every 100 females there were 88.5 males, and for every 100 females age 18 and over there were 84.6 males age 18 and over.

92.5% of residents lived in urban areas, while 7.5% lived in rural areas.

There were 15,474 households in Tupelo, of which 30.5% had children under the age of 18 living in them. Of all households, 40.1% were married-couple households, 19.1% were households with a male householder and no spouse or partner present, and 35.9% were households with a female householder and no spouse or partner present. About 32.9% of all households were made up of individuals and 13.3% had someone living alone who was 65 years of age or older. There were 9,648 families residing in the city.

There were 17,102 housing units, of which 9.5% were vacant. The homeowner vacancy rate was 1.5% and the rental vacancy rate was 13.3%.

Racial composition as of the 2020 census
Race	Number	Percent
White	20,358	53.7%
Black or African American	14,158	37.3%
American Indian and Alaska Native	110	0.3%
Asian	665	1.8%
Native Hawaiian and Other Pacific Islander	7	0.0%
Some other race	1,194	3.1%
Two or more races	1,431	3.8%
Hispanic or Latino (of any race)	1,869	4.9%

=== 2010 census ===
In 2010, there were 35,456 people, 13,602 households, and 8,965 families residing in the city. The racial makeup of the city was 58.7% White, 36.8% African American, 0.1% Native American, 1.0% Asian, 0.01% Pacific Islander, 2.0% from other races, and 1.4% from two or more races. 3.5% of the population were Hispanic or Latino of any race. The average household size was 2.47 and the average family size was 3.08. The median income for a household in the city was $39,415. The poverty rate was 20%.

=== 2007–2011 American Community Survey ===
According to the 2007–2011 American Community Survey 5-Year Estimates, there were 13,395 households, 42.8% were married couples living together, 2.6% had a male householder with no wife present, and 22.5% had a female householder with no husband present. 32.2% were non-family households, with 28.4% had a householder living alone and 3.8% having a householder not living alone. In addition, 39.7% of householders were living with related children under 18 and 60.3% with no related children under 18.

== Economy ==
Historically, Tupelo served as a regional transportation hub, primarily due to its location at a railroad intersection. More recently, it has developed as strong tourism and hospitality sector based around the Elvis Presley birthplace and Natchez Trace. The city has also been successful at attracting manufacturing, retail and distribution operations (see 'Industry' section below).

=== Industry ===
- Tupelo is the headquarters of the North Mississippi Medical Center, the largest non-metropolitan hospital in the United States. It serves people in North Mississippi, northwest Alabama, and portions of Tennessee. The medical center was a winner of the prestigious Malcolm Baldrige National Quality Award in 2006 and 2012.
- The headquarters of two large banking institutions in the state are located here: Cadence Bank, with approximately nearly $48 billion in assets (2024), and Renasant Bank, with assets of more than $26 billion (2025). Tupelo is the smallest U.S. city that hosts the headquarters of more than one bank with over $10 billion in assets.
- The city is a five-time "All-America City Award" winner.
- In 1963, Ralph J. Roberts, along with Daniel Aaron and Julian A. Brody purchased American Cable Systems, a small cable operator in Tupelo. American Cable was re-incorporated in Pennsylvania as Comcast.
- It has a large furniture manufacturing industry. The journalist Dennis Seid noted that furniture manufacturing in Northeast Mississippi, "provid[ed] some 22,000 jobs, or almost 13% of the region's employment... with a $732 million annual payroll... producing $2.25 billion worth of goods."
- Tecumseh, Heritage Home Group, Hancock Fabrics, Inc., Magnolia Fabrics, Toyota Motor Manufacturing Mississippi, H.M. Richards, JESCO Construction, MTD Products, Savings Oil Company (Dodge's Stores), Wicks_n'_More, and Cooper Tire & Rubber Company all operate or are headquartered in Tupelo and Lee County. Renin Corporation, a subsidiary of BBX Capital Corporation, operates a production centre in Tupelo which employed approximately 100 as of 2017.

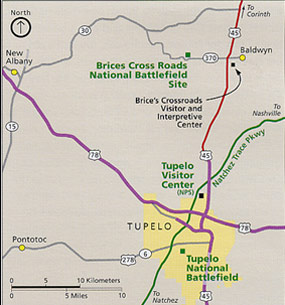
National Park Service map

== Arts and culture ==
- The Tupelo Buffalo Park and Zoo is home to a large American bison herd, as well as exotic animals like Emu, Pythons, and Zedonks.
- It is the headquarters of the historic Natchez Trace Parkway, which connects Natchez, Mississippi, to Nashville, Tennessee. The parkway follows the route of the ancient Natchez Trace trail, a path used by indigenous peoples long before the Europeans came to the area.
- Nearby is the Pharr Mounds, an important Middle Woodland period complex of nearly 2000-year-old burial earthworks, dating from 1 to 200 AD.
- Civil War sites include Tupelo and Brices Cross Roads national battlefields.
- The Tupelo Automobile Museum was one of the largest in North America. In 2003, it was designated as the official automobile museum of the state. It housed more than 150 rare automobiles, all from the personal collection of Frank K. Spain—who founded the channel WTVA. Unfortunately, the museum closed in March 2019 and the cars were auctioned off the following month.
- Since its founding in 1969, the Tupelo Community Theatre has produced more than 200 works. In 2001 and 2004, it won awards at the Mississippi Theatre Association's Community Theatre Festival. In 2004 its production of Bel Canto won at the Southeastern Theatre Conference. TCT's home is the historic Lyric Theatre, built in 1912.
- The North Mississippi Symphony Orchestra's season runs from September–April with concerts held at the Tupelo Civic Auditorium. The symphony's free annual July 4 outdoor concert at Ballard Park draws thousands of fans.
- In 2005, Rotary International sponsored a commission for a statue to honor Chief Piomingo, a leader of the Chickasaw people who had occupied this area. It was erected in front of the new Tupelo City Hall.
- The Oren Dunn City Museum tells the Story of Community Building through permanent exhibits and a collection of historic structures. The Special Exhibit Gallery provides a venue for a variety of traveling and temporary shows throughout the year.
- In June 1956, Elvis Presley returned to Tupelo for a concert at the Mississippi-Alabama State Fair & Dairy Show. This event was recreated at the eighth "Elvis Presley Festival" in Tupelo on June 3, 2006. The fairgrounds are part of Tupelo's Fairpark District. The documentary film The Homecoming: Tupelo Welcomes Elvis Home premiered at the 2006 festival.
- The Lee-Itawamba Library System was serviced in Tupelo. The Lee County Library in downtown Tupelo has an annual lecture series featuring nationally known authors. In addition to the annual lecture series, the Lee County Library features a Mississippi room dedicated to genealogy research.
- The Church Street Elementary School (for white students in the segregated system) was hailed as one of the most outstanding designs of its time, which was built in 1937. A scale model of this Art Moderne structure—described as "the ideal elementary school"—was displayed at the 1939 New York World's Fair.
- The Huntington Bank Arena (previously known as BancorpSouth Arena and Cadence Bank Arena) opened in 1993 and is a venue for large events.

== Government ==
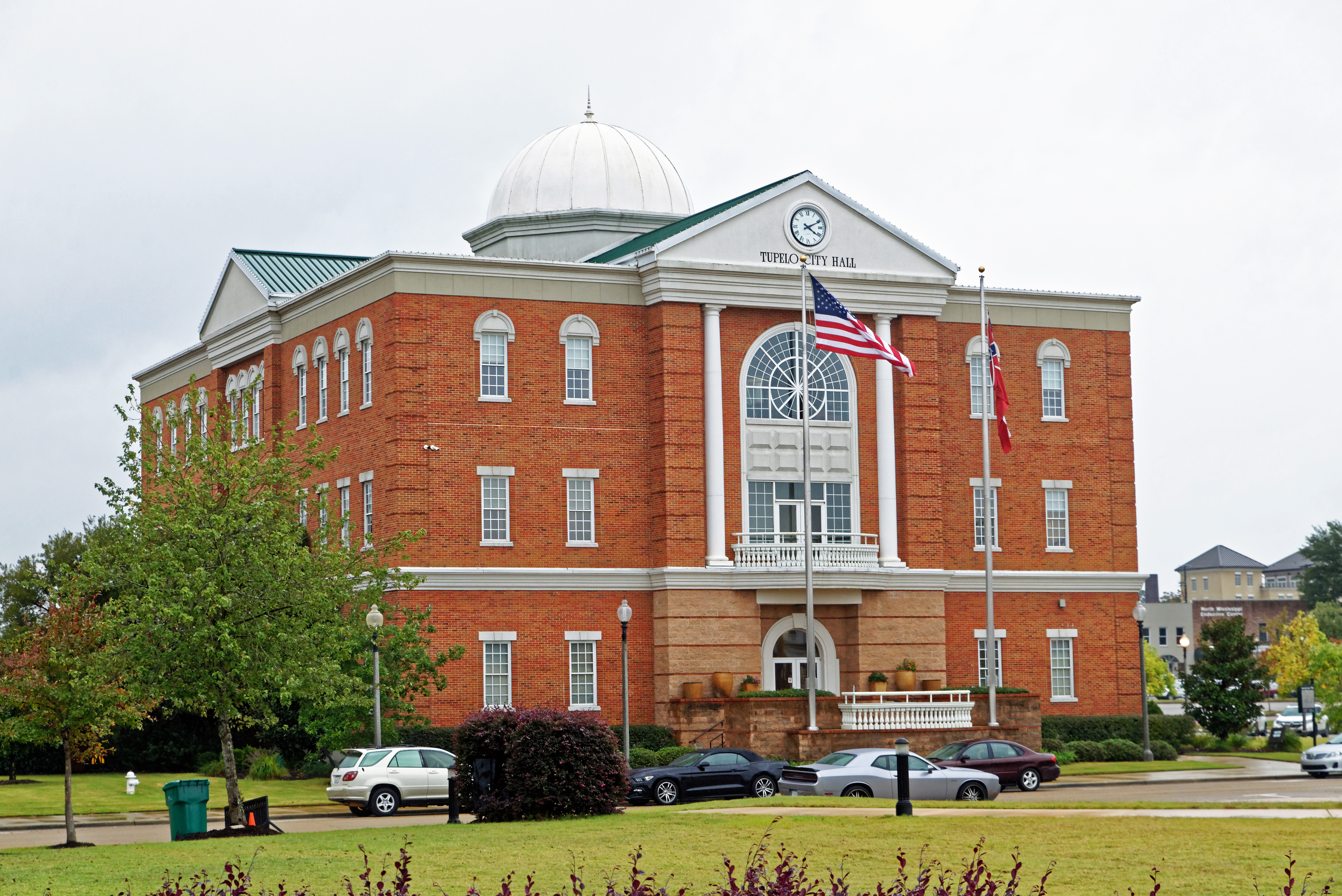
Main façade of the Tupelo City Hall

Tupelo's current mayor is Todd Jordan. The Tupelo Council is made up of seven representatives, each elected from single-member districts. They annually elect the president of the council on a rotating basis. In 2021, the President of the Tupelo City Council is Travis Beard. Other council members are Janet Gaston, Rosie Jones, Chad Mims, Buddy Palmer, Lynn Bryan, and Nettie Davis.

== Education ==
Tupelo Public School District is the school district for the vast majority of Tupelo. It participates in the Chromebook Distribution Policy, which means students in grades 6 to 12 are each given a school-owned Google Chromebook to use during the school year. In 2008, Sports Illustrated ranked the high school athletic department as the third-best high school athletic program in the nation. Tupelo High School is the largest public high school in Mississippi with a total of 1,931 students enrolled during the 2018–2019 school year.

Some portions of Tupelo are zoned to the Lee County School District.

For post-secondary education, the city has satellite campuses of the University of Mississippi, Itawamba Community College, and the Mississippi University for Women.

== Media ==
The local daily newspaper is the Northeast Mississippi Daily Journal. Tupelo is also served by the weekly Lee County Courier.

Tupelo is home to three television stations serving the 133rd-ranked designated market area among 210 markets nationwide as determined by Nielsen Media Research: WTVA (9), an NBC and ABC affiliate; and WLOV (27), a CW affiliate. Both stations are located on Beech Springs Road and were controlled by Frank K. Spain until his death on April 25, 2006.

The Christian fundamentalist American Family Association is located in Tupelo, and operates the national American Family Radio network and the OneNewsNow news service.

== Infrastructure ==
=== Transportation ===
==== Rail ====
Tupelo is served by BNSF Railway and Canadian Pacific Kansas City for freight transportation via rail.

==== Roads ====
U.S. Route 45, U.S. Route 78, U.S. Route 278, and Natchez Trace Parkway run through Tupelo; Interstate 22 runs north of the city on an east–west route.

==== Air ====
The city is served by Tupelo Regional Airport, with service on Contour Airlines.

== See also ==
- List of municipalities in Mississippi
- National Register of Historic Places listings in Lee County, Mississippi
- Tupelo Regional Airport
