= TA2 NZ Championship =

Sports car racing category in Australasia

- Category: Sports car racing
- Country: New Zealand
- Inaugural season: 2025–26
- Drivers: 22
- Constructors: Howe Racing Enterprises
- Engine suppliers: GM LS3
- Tyre suppliers: Hoosier
- Drivers' champion: (New Zealand) Caleb Byers
- Official website: www.ta2nz.co.nz

The TA2 NZ Championship, also known as the SP Tools TA2 NZ Championship under sponsorship, is a New Zealand motor racing category using TA2 class cars most closely associated with the American Trans-Am Series and the Australian TA2 Racing Muscle Car Series. Granted championship status by MotorSport New Zealand in 2025, the TA2 NZ Championship is the premier V8 touring car series in New Zealand with events taking place throughout the country in the summer season.

== History ==
The New Zealand V8 and V8SuperTourer series' were among the premier racing series in New Zealand throughout the 2000s, and into the 2010s. The close parity V8 engine-based touring formula proved popular with fans and both series' enjoyed healthy grid numbers. However, by the end of the 2010s, the V8SuperTourer series folded and the New Zealand V8 series had greatly reduced in popularity.

The TA2 NZ Championship was conceived by Paul Manuell who had first raced in the TA2 category throughout Thailand and Malaysia in 2019. Manuell had also raced in the New Zealand V8 and V8SuperTourer series' from the late 1990s to the early 2010s. Manuell, along with Andrew and Alison Turner, having seen the rapid growth of the category in Australia, saw the potential in a series in New Zealand and began setting forth plans for a national championship toward the end of the year. However, with the advent of the COVID-19 pandemic, these plans were halted for the time being.

As restrictions eased, the category began to grow throughout New Zealand. In 2023, a Trans-Tasman series was organised where drivers from the Australian TA2 series would compete against New Zealand customers for the Jason Richards Memorial Trophy. In June 2025, Motorsport New Zealand officially granted TA2 New Zealand Championship status for the 2025/26 season. Caleb Byers became the inaugural series champion ahead of Dylan Grant while Peter Ward claimed the Masters title.

== Cars ==
The TA2 NZ Championship is a spec series using identical spaceframe chassis built by Howe Racing Enterprises and using a modified GM LS3 engine. The cars use one of three fibreglass bodies resembling the Chevrolet Camaro, Ford Mustang, or Dodge Challenger. Regardless of the car body, the underlying chassis and engines are the same.

The series runs a buy/lease program to help streamline new competitors into the series.

== Circuits ==
- Hampton Downs Motorsport Park
- Highlands Motorsport Park
- Manfeild: Circuit Chris Amon
- Taupo International Motorsport Park
- Teretonga Park

== Media coverage ==
Run as part of the NextGen NZ Championship, the TA2 NZ series is broadcast on Sky Sport in New Zealand as well as through the series' YouTube channel by way of live streaming which can be viewed worldwide.

== Champions ==
Season	Champion	Runner-up	Third place	Master champion
2025–26	(New Zealand) Caleb Byers	(New Zealand) Dylan Grant	(New Zealand) Toby Elmiger	(New Zealand) Peter Ward

== See also ==
- NZ Touring Cars Championship
- V8SuperTourer
