= TA2 Racing Muscle Car Series =

Sports car racing category in Australasia

- Category: Sports car racing
- Country: Australia
- Inaugural season: 2017
- Drivers: 26
- Teams: 24
- Constructors: Howe Racing Enterprises
- Engine suppliers: GM LS3
- Tyre suppliers: Hoosier
- Drivers' champion: (Australia) Jarrod Hughes
- Official website: www.ta2racingaustralia.com

The TA2 Racing Muscle Car Series is an Australian motor racing category using TA2 class cars most closely associated with the American Trans-Am Series. It is the featured category at all rounds of the Hi-Tec Oils Super Series, an annual motor racing series held at various tracks in eastern Australia. The category is managed by TA2 Racing Australia, and sanctioned by the Australian Auto Sport Alliance. The category ownership, along with the distribution and parts business, was sold to a group of long-standing series competitors in 2024.

It is one of two Australian national-level racing series featuring TA2-class cars; the other is the Australian National Trans-Am Series. While run independently, both series feature identical cars, and the TA2 series organisers have changed technical regulations to keep cars eligible for both series.

== History ==
The category was established after driver and businessman Peter Robinson imported a Howe Racing Enterprises TA2-spec vehicle, with the intention of competing in a Queensland state-based sports sedan series. According to Robinson and colleague Craig Harris, they thought the relatively low purchase and operating cost, and the good performance of the vehicle made it a good basis for a one-make racing series.

In 2020, racing promotor ARG licensed the rights to the Trans-Am trademarks in Australia. However, an agreement between ARG and TA2 Racing Australia fell through, and TA2 Racing Australia opted to continue running the category as part of the AASA-sanctioned "Australian Motor Racing Series" (in 2024, branded as the Hi-Tec Oils Super Series).

ARG subsequently set up their own series based on the same cars, the Australian National Trans-Am Series.

The 2020 and 2021 series were affected by the global Covid-19 pandemic. In 2021, due to competitors being unable to travel between Australian states due to quarantine restrictions, two separate titles were awarded, a northern and southern series.

== Cars ==
The TA2 Racing Muscle Car Series is a spec series using identical spaceframe chassis built by Howe Racing Enterprises and using a modified GM LS3 engine. Most components are controlled, must be purchased from the vehicle's Australian distributor, and cannot be modified.

The cars may use one of three fibreglass bodies resembling the Chevrolet Camaro, Ford Mustang, or Dodge Challenger; regardless of the car body, the underlying chassis and engines are the same.

== Meeting format ==
The championship has generally been held over approximately six rounds. Of these rounds, most have three or four sprint races of approximately 20–30 minutes duration.

After a free practice session on the Friday of a race meeting, starting order for the first race of most race meetings is determined by a qualifying session. Starting order for subsequent races is determined by the finishing order in the immediately previous race.

In 2023 and 2024, one “enduro round” per season was held featuring a race of approximately one hour in length, with the option of a co-driver.

Unlike many circuit racing series in Australia, this series features "rolling starts" where the cars form up in grid order (in two rows) behind a safety car for a formation lap before commencing racing.

== Media coverage ==
The 2024 series is broadcast on SBS, through subscription TV providers Fox Sports (Australia) and Kayo Sports, and an extended livestream covering some practice and qualifying sessions as well as races on YouTube and SBS On Demand.

The series is covered by specialist motor racing publications including Auto Action and Speedcafe.

== Champions ==
| Season | Champion | Runner-up | Third place |
|---|---|---|---|
| 2017 | Russell Wright | Anthony Tenekate | Craig Harris |
| 2018 | Ashley Javis | Hugh McAlister | Russell Wright |
| 2019 | Aaron Seton | George Miedecke | Ashley Jarvis |
| 2020 | John McLaughlin | Murray Kent | Michael Kulig |
| 2021 | Jett Johnson (Northern Series); Mark Crutcher (Southern series) | Russell Wright (N); Zach Loscialpo (S) | Chris Pappas (N); Michael Coulter (S) |
| 2022 | Jett Johnson | Graham Cheney | Nicholas Bates |
| 2023 | Dylan Thomas | Josh Haynes | Jackson Rice |
| 2024 | Josh Haynes | Brad Gartner | Mark Crutcher |
| 2025 | Jarrod Hughes | Ben Gomersall | Josh Thomas |
