= 2025 TA2 Racing Muscle Car Series =

Scheduled motorsport race series

Champions
- Drivers' Champion: (Australia) Jarrod Hughes
- Masters Champion: (Australia) Graham Cheney

Seasons
- ← 2024 2026 →

The 2025 TA2 Racing Muscle Car Series was the ninth year of the TA2 Racing Muscle Car Series, a racing series for TA2-class cars held in the eastern states of Australia. The series was promoted by TA2 Racing Australia, and was the first under the new ownership of a group of regular series competitors.

It was one of two national series for this class of car in Australia - the other was the Australian National Trans-Am Series.

Traditionally ran over six rounds as the headline class at the Hi-Tec Oils Super Series, the series added a seventh round, as a support race at the Bathurst 6 Hour. This race was also part of the National Trans-Am Series, leading to an expected combined entry grid "in the vicinity of 40 cars" according to the series promoters.

== Calendar ==
Round	Event	Circuit	Dates	Format	Map
1	Hi-Tec Oils Super Series Round 1	(Victoria (state)) Winton Motor Raceway,	28 February–2 March	sprint races	2025 TA2 Racing Muscle Car Series is located in Australia
2	Bathurst 6 Hour (support race)	(New South Wales) Mount Panorama Circuit	18–20 April	combined race with Australian National Trans-Am Series (sprint format)	2025 TA2 Racing Muscle Car Series is located in Australia
3	Hi-Tec Oils Super Series Round 2	(New South Wales) Sydney Motorsport Park	30 May–June 1	sprint races	2025 TA2 Racing Muscle Car Series is located in Australia
4	Hi-Tec Oils Super Series Round 3	Queensland Raceway	27–29 June	sprint races	2025 TA2 Racing Muscle Car Series is located in Australia
5	Hi-Tec Oils Super Series Round 4	Queensland Raceway	15–17 August	two-driver enduro	2025 TA2 Racing Muscle Car Series is located in Australia
6	Hi-Tec Oils Super Series Round 5	(South Australia) Mallala	26–28 September	sprint races	2025 TA2 Racing Muscle Car Series is located in Australia
7	Hi-Tec Oils Super Series Round 6	(Victoria (state)) Winton Motor Raceway	31 October–2 November	sprint races	2025 TA2 Racing Muscle Car Series is located in Australia

== Entries ==
Manufacturer	Model	Entrant	No.	Driver Name	Class	Rounds	Co-Driver
Chevrolet	Camaro	Wilson Auto Racing	3	(Australia) Stephen Wilson		3–5	(Australia) Nick Lange
Chevrolet	Camaro	Reidy Racing	5	(Australia) Danny Reidy		1, 3–7	(Australia) Charlie Parker
Chevrolet	Camaro	Hi-Tec Oils Racing	7	(Australia) Robbie Farr	M	1–2, 4–6	(Australia) Jason Pryde
Chevrolet	Camaro	Hi-Tec Oils Racing	22	(Australia) Brad Gartner		1, 3–6	(Australia) Blake Tracey
Chevrolet	Camaro	Hi-Tec Oils Racing	66	(Australia) Lee Stibbs		3, 5	(Australia) Josh Haynes
Chevrolet	Camaro	Hi-Tec Oils Racing	66	(Australia) Blake Tracey		6–7	—
Chevrolet	Camaro	Hi-Tec Oils Racing	92	(Australia) Lee Stibbs		7	—
Chevrolet	Camaro	Jax Tyres & Auto	12	(Australia) Mark Bailey		1	—
Chevrolet	Camaro	Brock Paine Racing	33	(Australia) Brock Paine	R	3–7	(New Zealand) Daniel Jilesen
Chevrolet	Camaro	Nathan Herne Racing	42	(Australia) Tom Davies	R	3–6	(Australia) Nathan Herne
Chevrolet	Camaro	IES Motorsport	50	(Australia) Paul Hadley	M	1–3, 5–6	(Australia) Hugh McAlister
Chevrolet	Camaro	IES Motorsport	50	(Australia) Tyler Cheney		4	—
Chevrolet	Camaro	IES Motorsport	51	(Australia) Graham Cheney	M	All	(Australia) Tyler Cheney
Chevrolet	Camaro	IES Motorsport	118	(Australia) Jarrod Hughes		1–2, 4–6	(Australia) Craig Lowndes
Chevrolet	Camaro	IES Motorsport	118	(Australia) Tim Brook	M	3	—
Chevrolet	Camaro	IES Motorsport	150	(Australia) Alice Buckley		4–5	(Australia) Tim Slade
Chevrolet	Camaro	C&H Trucking	71	(Australia) Domain Ramsay	M	1, 3	—
Chevrolet	Camaro	Alientech	82	(Australia) Eric Ebert		5–7	(Australia) Luke van Herwaarde
Chevrolet	Camaro	KRT Motorsport	121	(Australia) Kiara Zabetakis	R	1–3	—
Dodge	Challenger	James Simpson Racing	2	(Australia) James Simpson		1, 4	—
Dodge	Challenger	CK Motorsport	25	(Australia) Coleby Cowham		4	—
Dodge	Challenger	Team RSG	81	(Australia) Hayden Jackson		1–5	(Australia) Declan Fraser
Ford	Mustang	Crutcher Developments	4	(Australia) Mark Crutcher	M	All	(Australia) Jordan Cox
Ford	Mustang	Ashley Jarvis Racing	8	(Australia) Lachlan Evennett		4–5	(Australia) James Golding
Ford	Mustang	Ashley Jarvis Racing	32	(New Zealand) Ayrton Hodson	R	2, 4	—
Ford	Mustang	Ashley Jarvis Racing	44	(Australia) Joel Heinrich		6	—
Ford	Mustang	Turps Tippers	11	(Australia) Steve Coulter		1–2	—
Ford	Mustang	Turps Tippers	11	(Australia) Michael Coulter		3	—
Ford	Mustang	TFH Hire Racing	11	(Australia) Brandon Madden		5	(Australia) Scott Andriske
Ford	Mustang	TFH Hire Racing	18	(Australia) Diesel Thomas	R	All	(Australia) Nash Morris
Ford	Mustang	TFH Hire Racing	35	(Australia) Ben Gomersall	R	1–5, 7	(Australia) Aaron Seton
Ford	Mustang	TFH Hire Racing	63	(Australia) Des Collier		1–5, 7	(Australia) Elliot Barbour
Ford	Mustang	TFH Hire Racing	69	(Australia) Josh Thomas		All	(Australia) Todd Hazelwood
Ford	Mustang	Arrow Transport Repairs	19	(Australia) Connor Roberts		4–5	(Australia) Ryan Casha
Ford	Mustang	Racing Academy	29	(Australia) Cameron Laws	R	1	—
Ford	Mustang	Blanchard Racing Team	36	(Australia) Tim Blanchard		5	(New Zealand) Jon Udy
Ford	Mustang	Nathan Herne Racing	42	(Australia) Tom Davies	R	1	—
Ford	Mustang	Total Parts Pro	45	(Australia) Hayden Hume		4	—
Ford	Mustang	Paul Morris Motorsport	67	(Australia) Paul Morris		5–6	(Australia) Brodie Kostecki
Ford	Mustang	Wadley Property Group	88	(Australia) Warren Wadley	M	1–3, 7	—
Ford	Mustang	Security of Supply Group	91	(New Zealand) Aaron Prosser		1–2, 5	(Australia) Cameron Laws
Ford	Mustang	Bargwanna Motorsport	97	(Australia) Ben Bargwanna		5	(Australia) Clay Richards
Ford	Mustang	Marcos Ambrose Motorsport	200	(Australia) Josh Webster	R	All	(Australia) George Miedecke

Icon	Class
R	Rookies
M	Masters

== Season summary ==
Rd	Race	Circuit	Pole position	Winning driver	Winning team	Winning car	Round Winner
1	1	(Victoria (state)) Winton Motor Raceway	(Australia) Jarrod Hughes	(Australia) Jarrod Hughes	IES Motorsport	Chevrolet Camaro	(Australia) Jarrod Hughes
1	2	(Victoria (state)) Winton Motor Raceway		(Australia) Jarrod Hughes	IES Motorsport	Chevrolet Camaro	(Australia) Jarrod Hughes
1	3	(Victoria (state)) Winton Motor Raceway	(Australia) Ben Gomersall	(Australia) Jarrod Hughes	IES Motorsport	Chevrolet Camaro	(Australia) Jarrod Hughes
1	4	(Victoria (state)) Winton Motor Raceway		(Australia) Ben Gomersall	TFH Racing	Ford Mustang	(Australia) Jarrod Hughes
2	1	(New South Wales) Mount Panorama Circuit	(Australia) Jarrod Hughes	(Australia) Jarrod Hughes	IES Motorsport	Chevrolet Camaro	(Australia) Ben Gomersall
2	2	(New South Wales) Mount Panorama Circuit		(Australia) Ben Gomersall	TFH Racing	Ford Mustang	(Australia) Ben Gomersall
3	1	(New South Wales) Sydney Motorsport Park	(Australia) Tim Brook	(Australia) Tim Brook	IES Motorsport	Chevrolet Camaro	(Australia) Tim Brook
3	2	(New South Wales) Sydney Motorsport Park		(Australia) Tim Brook	IES Motorsport	Chevrolet Camaro	(Australia) Tim Brook
3	3	(New South Wales) Sydney Motorsport Park	(Australia) Tim Brook	(Australia) Tim Brook	IES Motorsport	Chevrolet Camaro	(Australia) Tim Brook
3	4	(New South Wales) Sydney Motorsport Park		(Australia) Tim Brook	IES Motorsport	Chevrolet Camaro	(Australia) Tim Brook
4	1	Queensland Raceway	(Australia) Jarrod Hughes	(Australia) Jarrod Hughes	IES Motorsport	Chevrolet Camaro	(Australia) Jarrod Hughes
4	2	Queensland Raceway		(Australia) Jarrod Hughes	IES Motorsport	Chevrolet Camaro	(Australia) Jarrod Hughes
4	3	Queensland Raceway	(Australia) Alice Buckley	(Australia) Alice Buckley	IES Motorsport	Chevrolet Camaro	(Australia) Jarrod Hughes
4	4	Queensland Raceway		(Australia) Alice Buckley	IES Motorsport	Chevrolet Camaro	(Australia) Jarrod Hughes
5	1	Queensland Raceway	(Australia) Alice Buckley	(Australia) Alice Buckley	IES Motorsport	Chevrolet Camaro	(Australia) Alice Buckley (Australia) Tim Slade
5	2	Queensland Raceway	(Australia) James Golding	(Australia) James Golding	Ashley Jarvis Racing	Ford Mustang	(Australia) Alice Buckley (Australia) Tim Slade
5	3	Queensland Raceway		(Australia) Alice Buckley (Australia) Tim Slade	IES Motorsport	Chevrolet Camaro	(Australia) Alice Buckley (Australia) Tim Slade
5	4	Queensland Raceway		(Australia) Nathan Herne	Nathan Herne Racing	Chevrolet Camaro	(Australia) Alice Buckley (Australia) Tim Slade
5	5	Queensland Raceway		(Australia) Lachlan Evennett	Ashley Jarvis Racing	Ford Mustang	(Australia) Alice Buckley (Australia) Tim Slade
5	6	Queensland Raceway		(Australia) Paul Morris (Australia) Brodie Kostecki	Paul Morris Motorsport	Ford Mustang	(Australia) Alice Buckley (Australia) Tim Slade
6	1	(South Australia) Mallala	(Australia) Jarrod Hughes	(Australia) Blake Tracey	Hi-Tec Oils Racing	Chevrolet Camaro	(Australia) Blake Tracey
6	2	(South Australia) Mallala		(Australia) Blake Tracey	Hi-Tec Oils Racing	Chevrolet Camaro	(Australia) Blake Tracey
6	3	(South Australia) Mallala	(Australia) Jarrod Hughes	(Australia) Jarrod Hughes	IES Motorsport	Chevrolet Camaro	(Australia) Blake Tracey
6	4	(South Australia) Mallala		(Australia) Jarrod Hughes	IES Motorsport	Chevrolet Camaro	(Australia) Blake Tracey
7	1	(Victoria (state)) Winton Motor Raceway	(Australia) Brock Paine	(Australia) Ben Gomersall	TFH Racing	Ford Mustang	(Australia) Brock Paine
7	2	(Victoria (state)) Winton Motor Raceway		(Australia) Brock Paine	Brock Paine Racing	Chevrolet Camaro	(Australia) Brock Paine
7	3	(Victoria (state)) Winton Motor Raceway	(Australia) Brock Paine	(Australia) Brock Paine	Brock Paine Racing	Chevrolet Camaro	(Australia) Brock Paine
7	4	(Victoria (state)) Winton Motor Raceway		(Australia) Brock Paine	Brock Paine Racing	Chevrolet Camaro	(Australia) Brock Paine

== Points Standings ==
Pos.	Driver	WIN1				BAT		SYD				QLD1				QLD2						MAL				WIN2				Pen	Points
1	(Australia) Jarrod Hughes (Note: Tim Brook raced Car #118 at Sydney due to Jarrod Hughes having GT4 Commitments, but the points scored by Brook where for the car.)	1	1	1	2	6	10	1	1	1	1	1	1	2	5	3		3		2	3	Ret	DNS	1	1						1100
2	(Australia) Ben Gomersall	2	2	2	1	14	8	2	3	Ret	16	2	3	20	4	8		5		4	6					1	4	3	3		906
3	(Australia) Josh Thomas	5	5	4	Ret	17	9	3	2	2	4	6	4	3	3	19		8		14	4	Ret	8	11	9	3	7	6	4		821
4	(Australia) Diesel Thomas	Ret	13	8	4	33	24	8	5	7	3	7	6	4	2	6		9		5	Ret	5	5	7	6	6	2	5	7		736
5	(Australia) Josh Webster	3	3	5	Ret	23	14	Ret	Ret	5	5	9	9	21	10	9		6		Ret	10	8	7	8	5	5	Ret	2	6		615
6	(Australia) Brock Paine							Ret	9	3	2	11	13	10	Ret	14		DNS		15	Ret	7	4	5	8	2	1	1	1		542
7	(Australia) Tom Davies	Ret	DNS	DNS	DNS	15	30	4	10	4	9	3	2	8	Ret	10		7		10	2	4	6	6	7						527
8	(Australia) Brad Gartner	4	4	3	3			5	4	Ret	11	14	12	22	DNS	11		10		19	12	6	3	10	Ret						437
9	(Australia) Graham Cheney	8	8	6	9	25	15	7	6	Ret	Ret	12	11	18	12	17		11		16	18	Ret	9	12	10	9	6	12	9		421
10	(Australia) Des Collier	6	6	9	7	21	Ret	11	8	9	6	17	18	15	15	20		14		17	5					8	8	Ret	12		367
11	(Australia) Alice Buckley											4	8	1	1	1		1		3	17										357
12	(Australia) Paul Morris															5		2		7	1	3	11	4	4						318
13	(Australia) Blake Tracey					7	3										11	10	14		12	1	1	3	3	Ret	Ret	4	2		308
14	(Australia) Mark Crutcher	12	12	11	10	Ret	22	18	16	13	Ret	Ret	15	6	Ret	23		DNS		18	13	11	10	9	12	7	5	Ret	13		304
15	(Australia) Danny Reidy	14	15	12	13			14	7	16	Ret	18	17	13	14	22		Ret		12	DSQ	10	12	14	11	10	9	9	8		278
16	(Australia) Lachlan Evennett					12	Ret					10	22	7	7	2		4		1	16										233
17	(Australia) Joel Heinrich																					2	2	2	2						212
18	(Australia) Hayden Hume											8	5	19	Ret											4	3	7	5		210
19	(Australia) Robbie Farr	9	10	10	5	Ret	28					21	19	11	Ret	18		16		13	11	9	Ret	13	13						205
20	(Australia) Hayden Jackson	16	Ret	Ret	DNS	Ret	23	6	12	10	10	Ret	23	9	8	13		20		8	Ret										186
21	(Australia) Cameron Laws	DSQ	11	16	6	29	21	9	17	6	7						16	17	21		15										180
22	(New Zealand) Ayrton Hodson					19	26					5	7	5	6																160
23	(Australia) Michael Coulter	11	12	11	10	24	19	12	Ret	11	8																				151
24	(Australia) Lee Stibbs							10	11	8	12					12		Ret		11	7					Ret	Ret	8	DNS		147
25	(Australia) James Simpson	7	9	Ret	12							15	21	12	11																100
26	(Australia) Domain Ramsay	10	Ret	7	11	30	16	16	Ret	12	14																				91
27	(Australia) Paul Hadley	15	16	15	14	32	33									25		18		22	14	12	Ret	DNS	DNS						91
28	(Australia) Warren Wadley					Ret	DNS	17	15	17	15															12	12	11	11		88
29	(Australia) Brandon Madden															7		12		9	8										83
30	(Australia) Clay Richards															4		DNS		6	Ret										71
31	(Australia) Hayden Pullen																									11	11	10	10		64
32	(Australia) Tyler Cheney											13	10	14	9		7	11	6		18										60
33	(Australia) Connor Roberts											19	16	16	Ret	15		13		Ret	9										60
34	(Australia) Stephen Wilson							15	14	15	13	20	20	17	Ret	21		Ret		21	Ret										55
35	(Australia) Kiara Zabetakis	13	17	14	Ret	DNS	32	13	13	14	Ret																				50
36	(Australia) Mark Bailey	Ret	7	Ret	8	22	DSQ																								49
37	(Australia) Coleby Cowham											16	14	Ret	13																31
38	(New Zealand) Aaron Prosser					Ret	31									24		17		20	15										28
39	(Australia) Glen Ebert															Ret		19		Ret	Ret					Ret	10	Ret	DNS		20
40	(Australia) Tim Blanchard															16		15		Ret	Ret										17
Ineligible for drivers points
	(Australia) James Golding					1	4										1	4	8		16										
	(Australia) Todd Hazelwood					2	1										6	8	3		4										
	(Australia) Nathan Herne					3	2										4	7	1		2										
	(Australia) Elliot Barbour					4	6										10	14	9		5										
	(Australia) Jordan Cox					5	Ret										Ret	Ret	Ret		13										
	(Australia) Ben Grice					8	Ret																								
	(Australia) Adam Garwood					9	25																								
	(Australia) Ben Bargwanna					10	5																								
	(Australia) Jack Smith					11	27																								
	(Australia) Chase Hoy					13	Ret																								
	(Australia) James Moffat					16	11																								
	(Australia) Josh Haynes					18	7										13	Ret	15		7										
	(Australia) John Holinger					20	13																								
	(Australia) Brett Niall					26	20																								
	(Australia) Jason Pryde					27	17										17	16	17		11										
	(Australia) Craig Scutella					28	29																								
	(Australia) Jackson Rice					31	18																								
	(Australia) Nash Morris					Ret	12										DNS	9	4		Ret										
	(Australia) Charlie Nash					Ret	Ret																								
	(Australia) Tim Slade																2	1	2		17										
	(Australia) Brodie Kostecki																3	2	5		1										
	(Australia) Declan Fraser																5	20	7		Ret										
	(Australia) Aaron Seton																8	5	10		6										
	(Australia) Scott Adrinske																9	12	16		8										
	(Australia) Ryan Casha																12	13	12		9										
	(Australia) Nick Lange																14	Ret	23		Ret										
	(Australia) Hugh McAlister																15	18	22		14										
	(Australia) Jon Udy																18	15	24		Ret										
	(Australia) Craig Lowndes																Ret	3	13		1										
	(Australia) Charlie Parker																Ret	Ret	20		DSQ										
	(Australia) George Miedecke																DNS	6	11		10										
	(New Zealand) Daniel Jilesen																DNS	DNS	18		Ret										
	(Australia) Luke van Herwaarde																DNS	19	19		Ret										
Pos.	Driver	WIN1				BAT		SYD				QLD1				QLD2						MAL				WIN2				Pen	Points
