= Australian National Trans-Am Series =

Sports car racing category in Australasia

- Category: Sports car racing
- Country: Australia
- Inaugural season: 2020
- Drivers: 27
- Teams: 20
- Constructors: Howe Racing Enterprises
- Engine suppliers: GM LS3
- Tyre suppliers: Hoosier
- Drivers' champion: (Australia) Todd Hazelwood
- Teams' champion: (Australia) TFH Racing
- Official website: www.transam.com.au

The Australian National Trans-Am Series (also known as the Trico Trans-Am Series after the series sponsor) is a national motor sport series based on the American Trans-Am series.

It is a spec series featuring TA2-class cars, and runs as part of the SpeedSeries, a national series of motor racing events organised by Australian Racing Group and sanctioned by the FIA-affiliated Motorsport Australia.

It is one of two national, televised series featuring this class of car; the other is the TA2 Racing Muscle Car Series.

== History ==
The series was established in 2020, after a dispute between ARG and the organisers of what is now known as the TA2 Racing Muscle Car Series, who are also the importers of the Howe Racing Enterprises chassis that form the basis of both series.

ARG acquired the license for Trans-Am trademarks from the American series.

Of the two Australian series using the cars, the National Trans-Am series is generally regarded as having the strongest drivers in recent years, including Nathan Herne and Bathurst 1000-winning co-driver Todd Hazelwood.

== Cars ==
The Trans-Am series uses a standard spaceframe chassis built by Howe Racing Enterprises and Chevrolet LS3 engines prepared by McLaren Motor Engineering, a South Australian-based engineering firm (unrelated to the British McLaren Group). Other chassis and engines used in American TA2-class racing are not permitted.

Most of the car's engine, drivetrain, wheels, tires, brakes and suspension components are controlled, and must be purchased from the car's distributor and remain unmodified. Teams and drivers are permitted to alter suspension settings to optimise car setup.

== Round format ==
In 2024, each round featured multiple races over the course of the round weekend, including 3-race weekends of 2x25 minute and 1x30 minute races (expressed as a number of laps given the expected race pace of the vehicles), 4-race weekend with 4x25 minute races, and 2-race weekends with 2x45 minute races.

A minimum of 20 minutes of practice and 20 minutes of qualifying is held before the first race of each round, qualifying times determining grid order for the first race.

== Race starts ==
Unlike the Supercars Championship and many other circuit racing classes in Australia, the series features "rolling starts" where cars form up in grid order (in two rows) at slow speed behind a safety car for a formation lap before racing begins.

== Media coverage ==
The series is broadcast by the free to air Seven Network in Australia, with extended streaming coverage on the 7Plus streaming platform.

The series is covered by motor racing media outlets such as Auto Action and Speedcafe.

== Champions ==
Season	Champion	Runner-up	Third place
2021	Nathan Herne	Edan Thornburrow	Tim Brook
2022	Nathan Herne	Owen Kelly	Brett Holdsworth
2023	James Moffat	Lochie Dalton	Brett Holdsworth
2024	Todd Hazelwood	James Moffat	Jordan Boys
2025	Todd Hazelwood	Nathan Herne	James Golding
2026	Nathan Herne	Todd Hazelwood	Blake Tracey

== Circuits ==
- (South Australia) Adelaide Street Circuit (2020, 2024–2025)
- (Tasmania) Symmons Plains Raceway (2021–2025)
- (Victoria (state)) Phillip Island Grand Prix Circuit (2021–2024)
- (New South Wales) Mount Panorama Circuit (2021–present)
- (New South Wales) Sydney Motorsport Park (2021–2023)
- Queensland Raceway (2022–2024, 2026)
- (Victoria (state)) Sandown Raceway (2022–present)
- (Victoria (state)) Winton Motor Raceway (2023)
- (South Australia) The Bend Motorsport Park (2024–present)
- (Northern Territory) Hidden Valley Raceway (2025–present)
- (South Australia) Mallala Motor Sport Park (2025)
- (Western Australia) Wanneroo Raceway (2026)
