= 2026 TA2 Racing Muscle Car Series =

Scheduled motorsport race series

The 2026 TA2 Racing Muscle Car Series was a motor racing competition for TA2 race cars. It was the tenth running of the TA2 Racing Muscle Car Series and the second under the new ownership of a group of regular series competitors. It was one of two national series for the TA2 class in Australia; the other being the Australian National Trans-Am Series.

Run in conjuncture with the Hi-Tec Oils Super Series, the championship began at The Bend Motorsport Park on March 13 and concluded at Phillip Island Grand Prix Circuit on November 22. The defending drivers' champion was Jarrod Hughes.

== Calendar ==
The following circuits were due to host a round of the 2026 championship.

Round	Circuit	Dates	Format	Map
1	(South Australia) The Bend Motorsport Park	13–15 March	sprint races	2026 TA2 Racing Muscle Car Series is located in Australia
NC	(New South Wales) Mount Panorama Circuit	3–5 April	sprint races (combined with Trans-Am)	2026 TA2 Racing Muscle Car Series is located in Australia
2	Queensland Raceway	1–3 May	two-driver enduro	2026 TA2 Racing Muscle Car Series is located in Australia
3	(New South Wales) Sydney Motorsport Park	17–18 July	sprint races	2026 TA2 Racing Muscle Car Series is located in Australia
4	Queensland Raceway	14–16 August	sprint races	2026 TA2 Racing Muscle Car Series is located in Australia
5	(Victoria (state)) Winton Motor Raceway	25–27 September	sprint races	2026 TA2 Racing Muscle Car Series is located in Australia
6	(Victoria (state)) Phillip Island Grand Prix Circuit	20–22 November	sprint races	2026 TA2 Racing Muscle Car Series is located in Australia

== Teams and drivers ==
Manufacturer	Model	Entrant	No.	Driver Name	Class	Rounds	Co-Driver
Chevrolet	Camaro	IES Motorsport	1	(Australia) Jarrod Hughes		2	(New Zealand) Caleb Byers
Chevrolet	Camaro	IES Motorsport	38	(Australia) Tyler Cheney		1–5	(Australia) Tim Brook
Chevrolet	Camaro	IES Motorsport	50	(Australia) Paul Hadley	M	1–4	(Australia) Graham Cheney
Chevrolet	Camaro	IES Motorsport	51	(Australia) Graham Cheney	M	3	—N/a
Chevrolet	Camaro	Steve Wilson Racing	3	(Australia) Steve Wilson		1–2	(Australia) Nick Lange
Chevrolet	Camaro	Reidy Racing	5	(Australia) Danny Reidy		1–5	(Australia) Charlie Parker
Chevrolet	Camaro	Robbie Farr Motorsport	7	(Australia) Robbie Farr	M	1–5	(Australia) Jason Pryde
Chevrolet	Camaro	Castle Railing & Gates	9	(Australia) Cameron Laws		1–5	(Australia) Cody Gillis
Chevrolet	Camaro	Arrow Truck Repairs	19	(Australia) Connor Roberts		4	—N/a
Chevrolet	Camaro	KRT Motorsport	21	(Australia) Kiara Zabetakis		1, 3	—N/a
Chevrolet	Camaro	Brock Paine Racing	33	(Australia) Brock Paine		1–5	(Australia) Brad Gartner
Chevrolet	Camaro	Hi-Tec Oils	37	(Australia) Jackson Rice		1–3, 5	(Australia) Chase Hoy
Chevrolet	Camaro	Matt Stone Racing	39	(Australia) Chris Smerdon	M	1–5	(Australia) Oscar Targett
Chevrolet	Camaro	Matt Stone Racing	89	(Australia) Patrick Neville	R	1–5	(Australia) Sam Simpson
Chevrolet	Camaro	Matt Stone Racing	116	(Australia) Tommy Smith		1–5	(Australia) Jack Smith
Chevrolet	Camaro	C&H Trucking	71	(Australia) Domain Ramsay	M	5	—N/a
Chevrolet	Camaro	Ash Jarvis Racing	76	(Australia) Clint Rayner	M	1–2, 5	(Australia) Dion Jarvis
Chevrolet	Camaro	Kavich Racing	92	(Australia) Ben Kavich		2–3	(Australia) Ben Grice
Chevrolet	Camaro	Alice Buckley Motorsport	150	(Australia) Alice Buckley		1–5	(Australia) Tim Slade
Dodge	Challenger	Ashley Jarvis Racing	25	(Australia) Coleby Cowham		4	—N/a
Ford	Mustang		00	(Australia) Ryan MacMillan		2	(Australia) Cameron McLeod
Ford	Mustang	Crutcher Developments	4	(Australia) Mark Crutcher	M	2	(Australia) Hugh McAlister
Ford	Mustang	Osborne Transport	16	(Australia) Joel Heinrich		1–5	(Australia) Max Vidau
Ford	Mustang	TFH Racing	18	(Australia) Diesel Thomas		1–2	(Australia) Josh Thomas
Ford	Mustang	TFH Racing	63	(Australia) Des Collier		1–5	(Australia) Elliot Barbour
Ford	Mustang	TFH Racing	69	(Australia) Josh Thomas		1	—N/a
Ford	Mustang	Waltech	19	(Australia) Pip Casabene	R	1–2	(New Zealand) Ryan Wood
Ford	Mustang	Action Linemarking	23	(Australia) Scott Dornan	M	3	—N/a
Ford	Mustang	Ash Jarvis Racing	32	(Australia) Ben Gomersall		1–5	(Australia) Will Davison
Ford	Mustang	Ash Jarvis Racing	76	(Australia) Clint Rayner	M	3–4	—N/a
Ford	Mustang	Kody Garland Racing	41	(Australia) Kody Garland		1–5	(New Zealand) Ayrton Hodson
Ford	Mustang	Total Parts Pro	45	(Australia) Hayden Hume		3–5	—N/a
Ford	Mustang	Paul Morris Motorsport	67	(Australia) Nash Morris		2–4	(Australia) Brodie Kostecki
Ford	Mustang	Wadley Property Group	88	(Australia) Warren Wadley		2, 4	(Australia) Hayden Hume
Ford	Mustang	Garage 21	96	(Australia) Ayce Buckley		5	—N/a

Icon	Class
R	Rookies
M	Masters

== Results and standings ==
=== Season summary ===
Rd	Race	Circuit	Pole position	Winning driver	Winning team	Winning car	Round Winner
1	1	(South Australia) The Bend Motorsport Park	(Australia) Tyler Cheney	(Australia) Joel Heinrich	(Australia) Tyler Cheney	IES Motorsport	(Australia) Jackson Rice
1	2	(South Australia) The Bend Motorsport Park		(Australia) Jackson Rice	(Australia) Tommy Smith	Matt Stone Racing	(Australia) Jackson Rice
1	3	(South Australia) The Bend Motorsport Park	(Australia) Jackson Rice	(Australia) Tyler Cheney	(Australia) Jackson Rice	Hi-Tec Oils	(Australia) Jackson Rice
1	4	(South Australia) The Bend Motorsport Park		(Australia) Tyler Cheney	(Australia) Jackson Rice	Hi-Tec Oils	(Australia) Jackson Rice
2	1	Queensland Raceway	(Australia) Alice Buckley	(Australia) Brodie Kostecki	(Australia) Alice Buckley	Alice Buckley Motorsport	(Australia) Alice Buckley (Australia) Tim Slade
2	2	Queensland Raceway	(Australia) Tim Slade	(Australia) Tim Slade	(Australia) Tim Slade	Alice Buckley Motorsport	(Australia) Alice Buckley (Australia) Tim Slade
2	3	Queensland Raceway		(Australia) Alice Buckley (Australia) Tim Slade	(Australia) Alice Buckley (Australia) Tim Slade	Alice Buckley Motorsport	(Australia) Alice Buckley (Australia) Tim Slade
2	4	Queensland Raceway		(New Zealand) Ryan Wood	(New Zealand) Ryan Wood	Waltech	(Australia) Alice Buckley (Australia) Tim Slade
2	5	Queensland Raceway		(Australia) Cameron McLeod	(Australia) Brodie Kostecki	Paul Morris Motorsport	(Australia) Alice Buckley (Australia) Tim Slade
2	6	Queensland Raceway		(Australia) Alice Buckley (Australia) Tim Slade	(Australia) Alice Buckley (Australia) Tim Slade	Alice Buckley Motorsport	(Australia) Alice Buckley (Australia) Tim Slade
3	1	(New South Wales) Sydney Motorsport Park	(Australia) Ben Gomersall	(Australia) Nash Morris	(Australia) Nash Morris	Paul Morris Motorsport	(Australia) Nash Morris
3	2	(New South Wales) Sydney Motorsport Park		(Australia) Ben Gomersall	(Australia) Ben Gomersall	Ash Jarvis Racing	(Australia) Nash Morris
3	3	(New South Wales) Sydney Motorsport Park	(Australia) Ben Gomersall	(Australia) Tyler Cheney	(Australia) Tyler Cheney	IES Motorsport	(Australia) Nash Morris
3	4	(New South Wales) Sydney Motorsport Park		(Australia) Ben Gomersall	(Australia) Nash Morris	Paul Morris Motorsport	(Australia) Nash Morris
4	1	Queensland Raceway	(Australia) Joel Heinrich	(Australia) Tyler Cheney	(Australia) Nash Morris	Paul Morris Motorsport	(Australia) Nash Morris
4	2	Queensland Raceway		(Australia) Nash Morris	(Australia) Nash Morris	Paul Morris Motorsport	(Australia) Nash Morris
4	3	Queensland Raceway	(Australia) Tommy Smith	(Australia) Tommy Smith	(Australia) Tommy Smith	Matt Stone Racing	(Australia) Nash Morris
4	4	Queensland Raceway		(Australia) Ben Gomersall	(Australia) Nash Morris	Paul Morris Motorsport	(Australia) Nash Morris
5	1	(Victoria (state)) Winton Motor Raceway	(Australia) Alice Buckley	(Australia) Alice Buckley	(Australia) Alice Buckley	Alice Buckley Motorsport	(Australia) Ben Gomersall
5	2	(Victoria (state)) Winton Motor Raceway		(Australia) Alice Buckley	(Australia) Alice Buckley	Alice Buckley Motorsport	(Australia) Ben Gomersall
5	3	(Victoria (state)) Winton Motor Raceway	(Australia) Alice Buckley	(Australia) Alice Buckley	(Australia) Ben Gomersall	Ash Jarvis Racing	(Australia) Ben Gomersall
5	4	(Victoria (state)) Winton Motor Raceway		(Australia) Ben Gomersall	(Australia) Ben Gomersall	Ash Jarvis Racing	(Australia) Ben Gomersall
6	1	(Victoria (state)) Phillip Island Grand Prix Circuit	(Australia) Tyler Cheney	(Australia) Ben Gomersall	(Australia) Ben Gomersall	Ash Jarvis Racing	
6	2	(Victoria (state)) Phillip Island Grand Prix Circuit		(Australia) Ben Gomersall	(Australia) Ben Gomersall	Ash Jarvis Racing	
6	3	(Victoria (state)) Phillip Island Grand Prix Circuit	(Australia) Ben Gomersall	(Australia) Pip Casabene	(Australia) Pip Casabene	Waltech	
6	4	(Victoria (state)) Phillip Island Grand Prix Circuit		(Australia) Kody Garland	(Australia) Ben Gomersall	Kody Garland Racing	

=== Championship standings ===
Pos.	Driver	(South Australia) BEN				(Queensland) QLD1						(New South Wales) SYD				(Queensland) QLD2				(Victoria (state)) WIN				(Victoria (state)) PHI				Pen	Points
Pos.	Driver	R1	R2	R3	R4	R1	R2	R3	R4	R5	R6	R1	R2	R3	R4	R1	R2	R3	R4	R1	R2	R3	R4	R1	R2	R3	R4	Pen	Points
1	(Australia) Alice Buckley	5	4	10	6	1		1		2	1	2	4	8	8	4	5	12	Ret	1	1	2	2						364
2	(Australia) Tyler Cheney	1	3	2	3	4		4		3	5	5	7	1	3	3	2	8	7	7	14	3	3						363
3	(Australia) Ben Gomersall	Ret	Ret	4	DNS	2		2		5	3	8	1	3	2	18	3	3	2	2	2	1	1						362
4	(Australia) Joel Heinrich	4	2	5	2	7		5		9	Ret	3	3	4	4	2	18	4	4	5	5	11	7						305
5	(Australia) Tommy Smith	2	1	3	5	15		Ret		8	10	4	5	9	12	6	4	1	3	16	8	4	6						269
6	(Australia) Brock Paine	Ret	10	9	4	6		6		7	4	9	11	5	7	17	6	5	6	6	6	5	4						248
7	(Australia) Nash Morris						3	3	3		2	1	2	2	1	1	1	2	1										207
8	(Australia) Jackson Rice	3	5	1	1	8		Ret		10	Ret	10	8	7	5					17	7	13	9						177
9	(Australia) Hayden Hume						DNS	DNS	DNS		DNS	Ret	9	6	6	5	7	7	5	3	3	7	5						157
10	(Australia) Kody Garland	7	6	6	7	19		7		13	Ret	6	10	18	10	8	11	6	8	Ret	WD	WD	WD						138
11	(Australia) Robbie Farr	10	8	11	Ret	14		9		14	9	7	6	Ret	DNS	Ret	Ret	Ret	12	8	Ret	8	8						103
12	(Australia) Brodie Kostecki					3		3		1	2																		100
13	(Australia) Des Collier	15	9	13	9	12		11		16	8	11	15	13	11	Ret	12	11	10	15	15	9	16						97
14	(Australia) Pip Casabene	8	7	7	8	5		Ret		6	11																		75
15	(Australia) Danny Reidy	Ret	DNS	15	Ret	16		12		15	14	15	18	14	15	9	9	10	Ret	9	9	15	11						68
16	(Australia) Cam Laws	11	Ret	12	DNS	Ret		Ret		21	Ret	12	13	12	9	12	10	13	11	10	13	12	15						67
17	(Australia) Patrick Neville	Ret	13	17	11	Ret		17	Ret	17	12	17	16	15	17	11	15	16	14	14	11	16	14						54
18	(Australia) Chris Smerdon	14	12	18	10	21		Ret		Ret	Ret	18	14	16	18	13	13	17	15	11	12	14	12						52
19	(Australia) Ayce Buckley																			4	4	6	Ret						44
20	(Australia) Cameron McLeod					10		19		4	6																		42
21	(Australia) Clinton Rayner	9	Ret	DNS	Ret	17		13		19	13	16	17	Ret	14	14	14	Ret	DNS	12	Ret	17	13						41
22	(Australia) Coleby Cowham															7	8	9	9										37
23	(New Zealand) Caleb Byers					13		8		12	7																		35
24	(Australia) Josh Thomas	6	Ret	14	DNS	9		10		11	DNS																		35
25	(Australia) Domain Ramsay																			13	10	10	10						23
26	(Australia) Stephen Wilson	13	11	16	12	18		16		DNS	16																		20
27	(Australia) Scott Dornan											13	12	10	13														16
28	(Australia) Paul Hedley	DNS	DNS	DNS	DNS	20		18		20	15					16	Ret	15	16										16
29	(Australia) Connor Roberts															10	17	14	12										15
30	(Australia) Ben Kavich					Ret		15		18	Ret	14	Ret	17	16														12
31	(Australia) Diesel Thomas	Ret	Ret	8	DNS		11	10	Ret		DNS																		9
32	(Australia) Mark Crutcher					11		14		DNS	DNS																		9
33	(Australia) Kiara Zabetakis	12	Ret	Ret	DNS							Ret	DNS	DNS	DNS														4
34	(Australia) Warren Wadley					DNS		DNS		DNS	DNS					15	16	DNS	DNS										4
35	(Australia) Graham Cheney						15	18	16		15	Ret	Ret	11	Ret														0
Drivers ineligible for points
	(Australia) Tim Slade						1	1	2		1																		0
	(New Zealand) Ryan Wood						2	Ret	1		11																		0
	(Australia) Elliot Barbour						4	11	6		8																		0
	(Australia) Jarrod Hughes						5	8	4		7																		0
	(New Zealand) Ayrton Hodson						6	7	5		Ret																		0
	(Australia) Max Vidau						7	5	Ret		Ret																		0
	(Australia) Tim Brook						8	4	8		5																		0
	(Australia) Jack Smith						9	Ret	17		10																		0
	(Australia) Brad Gartner						10	6	9		4																		0
	(Australia) Chase Hoy						12	Ret	14		Ret																		0
	(Australia) Ben Grice						13	15	7		Ret																		0
	(Australia) Sam Simpson						14	17																					0
	(Australia) Hugh McAlister						16	14	Ret		DNS																		0
	(Australia) Dion Jarvis						17	13	12		13																		0
	(Australia) Jason Pryde						18	9	15		9																		0
	(Australia) Oscar Targett						19	Ret	10		Ret																		0
	(Australia) Will Davison						Ret	2	11		3																		0
	(Australia) Ryan MacMillan						Ret	19	18		6																		0
	(Australia) Charlie Parker						Ret	12	Ret		14																		0
	(Australia) Cody Gillis						Ret	Ret	13		Ret																		0
	(Australia) Nick Lange						DNS	16	Ret		16																		0
Pos.	Driver	R1	R2	R3	R4	R1	R2	R3	R4	R5	R6	R1	R2	R3	R4	R1	R2	R3	R4	R1	R2	R3	R4	R1	R2	R3	R4	Pen	Points
Pos.	Driver	(South Australia) BEN				(Queensland) QLD1						(New South Wales) SYD				(Queensland) QLD2				(Victoria (state)) WIN				(Victoria (state)) PHI				Pen	Points
