= 2023 Australian National Trans Am Series =

Australian motor sport competition

The 2023 Australian National Trans Am Series (commercially titled 2023 Turtle Wax National Trans Am Series) is the fourth season of the Australian National Trans-Am Series. The series ran as part of SpeedSeries.

== Calendar ==
Round	Circuit	Location	Date
1	(Tasmania) Symmons Plains Raceway	Launceston, Tasmania	24–26 February
2	(Victoria (state)) Phillip Island Grand Prix Circuit	Phillip Island, Victoria	12–14 May
3	(Victoria (state)) Winton Motor Raceway	Winton, Victoria	9–11 June
4	Queensland Raceway	Ipswich, Queensland	11–13 August
5	(Victoria (state)) Sandown Raceway	Melbourne, Victoria	8–10 September
6	(New South Wales) Sydney Motorsport Park	Eastern Creek, New South Wales	3–5 November
7	(New South Wales) Mount Panorama Circuit	Bathurst, New South Wales	10–12 November
Map
2023 Australian National Trans Am Series is located in Australia

== Entry list ==
Manufacturer	Car	Team	No.	Driver	Class	Rounds
Chevrolet	Camaro	Dream Racing Australia	27	(Australia) Tyler Everingham		1–3
Chevrolet	Camaro	Dream Racing Australia	200	(Australia) Joshua Webster		1–5
Chevrolet	Camaro	Dream Racing Australia	777	(Australia) Craig Scutella	M	1–5
Chevrolet	Camaro	Holinger Racing	23	(Australia) John Holinger	M	1–5
Chevrolet	Camaro	The Tefol Group	44	(Australia) Nick Lange	H	3–5
Chevrolet	Camaro	Arrow Financial Services	66	(Australia) Lee Stibbs	H	5
Chevrolet	Camaro	Elliot Barbour Racing	75	(Australia) Elliot Barbour		1–5
Chevrolet	Camaro	TPS Group/Breeze Holiday Parks	99	(Australia) Brett Holdsworth		1–5
Dodge	Challenger	Dream Racing Australia	12	(Australia) Adam Garwood		1
Dodge	Challenger	Shaun Richardson Motorsport	33	(Australia) Shaun Richardson	H	4
Dodge	Challenger	Total Parts Plus	55	(Australia) Tim Brook		4
Dodge	Challenger	Cairns Plaza Hotel	782	(Australia) James Simpson	H	1, 4
Ford	Mustang	All-American Driveline	03	(Australia) Benjamin Grice		1–5
Ford	Mustang	Crutcher Developments	4	(Australia) Mark Crutcher	M	1, 4–5
Ford	Mustang	The Racing Academy	5	(Australia) Cody Gillis		1–5
Ford	Mustang	The Racing Academy	19	(Australia) Tim Slade		1
Ford	Mustang	The Racing Academy	19	(Australia) Elliott Cleary		2–5
Ford	Mustang	The Racing Academy	29	(Australia) Jaylyn Robotham		1–2
Ford	Mustang	The Racing Academy	29	(Australia) Elly Morrow		5
Ford	Mustang	Wealth Rite Racing	8	(Australia) Chris Pappas	H	2–3, 5
Ford	Mustang	Dream Racing Australia	7	(Australia) Jackson Rice		3
Ford	Mustang	Thomas Hayman Motorsport	30	(Australia) Thomas Hayman		1–5
Ford	Mustang	Garry Rogers Motorsport	34	(Australia) James Moffat		1–5
Ford	Mustang	Garry Rogers Motorsport	45	(Australia) Lochie Dalton		1–5
Ford	Mustang	Paul Morris Motorsport	67	(Australia) Nash Morris		2–3, 5
Ford	Mustang	TFH Hire Services	69	(Australia) Joshua Thomas		4–5
Ford	Mustang	Owen Kelly Motorsport	73	(Australia) Owen Kelly		1–3
Ford	Mustang	Sydney Property Care	116	(Australia) Edan Thornburrow		1–5
Ford	Mustang	Dick Johnson Racing	117	(Australia) Jett Johnson		1

Icon	Status
H	Hoosier Cup
M	Masters Cup

== Results and standings ==
=== Results summary ===
Rnd		Event	Pole position	Fastest lap	Winning driver	Winning team	Winning car
1	R1	(Tasmania) Symmons Plains	(Australia) Benjamin Grice	(Australia) James Moffat	(Australia) James Moffat	Garry Rogers Motorsport	Ford Mustang
1	R2	(Tasmania) Symmons Plains		(Australia) Benjamin Grice	(Australia) Benjamin Grice	All-American Driveline	Ford Mustang
1	R3	(Tasmania) Symmons Plains		(Australia) Tyler Everingham	(Australia) James Moffat	Garry Rogers Motorsport	Ford Mustang
2	R1	(Victoria (state)) Phillip Island	(Australia) James Moffat	(Australia) James Moffat	(Australia) Owen Kelly	Owen Kelly Motorsport	Ford Mustang
2	R2	(Victoria (state)) Phillip Island		(Australia) James Moffat	(Australia) Nash Morris	Paul Morris Motorsport	Ford Mustang
2	R3	(Victoria (state)) Phillip Island		(Australia) Benjamin Grice	(Australia) Nash Morris	Paul Morris Motorsport	Ford Mustang
3	R1	(Victoria (state)) Winton	(Australia) Lochie Dalton	(Australia) Brett Holdsworth	(Australia) Lochie Dalton	Garry Rogers Motorsport	Ford Mustang
3	R2	(Victoria (state)) Winton		(Australia) Cody Gillis	(Australia) Lochie Dalton	Garry Rogers Motorsport	Ford Mustang
3	R3	(Victoria (state)) Winton		(Australia) Lochie Dalton	(Australia) Lochie Dalton	Garry Rogers Motorsport	Ford Mustang
4	R1	(Queensland) Ipswich	(Australia) Cody Gillis		(Australia) Cody Gillis	The Racing Academy	Ford Mustang
4	R2	(Queensland) Ipswich		(Australia) Elliot Barbour	(Australia) Thomas Hayman	Thomas Hayman Motorsport	Ford Mustang
4	R3	(Queensland) Ipswich		(Australia) Thomas Hayman	(Australia) Thomas Hayman	Thomas Hayman Motorsport	Ford Mustang
4	R4	(Queensland) Ipswich		(Australia) Thomas Hayman	(Australia) Thomas Hayman	Thomas Hayman Motorsport	Ford Mustang
5	R1	(Victoria (state)) Sandown	(Australia) James Moffat	(Australia) James Moffat	(Australia) James Moffat	Garry Rogers Motorsport	Ford Mustang
5	R2	(Victoria (state)) Sandown		(Australia) Thomas Hayman	(Australia) James Moffat	Garry Rogers Motorsport	Ford Mustang
5	R3	(Victoria (state)) Sandown		(Australia) James Moffat	(Australia) James Moffat	Garry Rogers Motorsport	Ford Mustang
6	R1	(New South Wales) Eastern Creek					
6	R2	(New South Wales) Eastern Creek					
6	R3	(New South Wales) Eastern Creek					
6	R4	(New South Wales) Eastern Creek					
7	R1	(New South Wales) Bathurst					
7	R2	(New South Wales) Bathurst					
7	R3	(New South Wales) Bathurst					

=== Championship standings ===
Position	1st	2nd	3rd	4th	5th	6th	7th	8th	9th	10th	11th	12th	13th	14th	15th	16th	17th	18th	19th	20th	21st	22nd	23rd	24th	25th
Races 1+2	60	56	54	52	50	49	48	47	46	45	44	43	42	41	40	39	38	37	36	35	34	33	32	31	30
Race 3	80	76	74	72	70	69	68	67	66	65	64	63	62	61	60	59	58	57	56	55	54	53	52	51	50

Pos.	Driver	SYM (Tasmania)			PHI (Victoria (state))			WIN (Victoria (state))			QLD (Queensland)				SAN (Victoria (state))			SMP (New South Wales)				BAT (New South Wales)			Pen.	Points
1	(Australia) James Moffat	1	1	1	Ret	3	2	6	3	2	C	3	4	3	1	1	4	1	2	2	1	1	C	14		1334
2	(Australia) Lochie Dalton	5	4	2	16	8	3	1	1	1	C	7	2	2	9	4	1	3	4	18	17	3	C	6		1258
3	(Australia) Brett Holdsworth	8	7	5	3	7	Ret	9	8	16	C	6	5	5	8	3	7	10	11	6	7	7	C	3		1134
4	(Australia) Thomas Hayman	6	Ret	DNS	7	5	7	16	9	4	C	1	1	1	2	8	Ret	9	7	Ret	5	5	C	1	30	1087
5	(Australia) Elliot Barbour	Ret	10	11	Ret	6	8	17	11	17																1074
6	(Australia) Craig Scutella	14	15	9	14	14	11	13	18	13																985
7	(Australia) Cody Gillis	Ret	9	13	9	9	6	2	2	3															30	982
8	(Australia) Joshua Webster	11	14	8	12	13	10	11	14	10																946
9	(Australia) John Holinger	15	17	10	13	12	12	14	15	14																932
10	(Australia) Benjamin Grice	2	Ret	DNS	5	4	Ret	3	4	5															30	889
11	(Australia) Nash Morris				2	1	1	7	7	8																841
12	(Australia) Edan Thornburrow	12	6	12	4	2	Ret	5	6	Ret																799
13	(Australia) Nick Lange							10	17	11																779
14	(Australia) Elliott Cleary				10	10	9																			550
15	(Australia) Chris Pappas				11	11	Ret	15	16	12																635
16	(Australia) Mark Crutcher	Ret	16	Ret																						561
17	(Australia) Tim Brook																									530
18	(Australia) Joshua Thomas																									505
19	(Australia) Owen Kelly	3	3	7	1	Ret	4	12	10	6																474
20	(United States) Robert Noaker																									265
21	(Australia) Jaylyn Robotham	4	5	3	6	Ret	5																			247
22	(Australia) Tyler Everingham	9	8	Ret	8	Ret	Ret	Ret	13	15																234
23	(Australia) Jackson Rice							4	5	9																228
24	(Australia) Hugh McAlister																									149
25	(Australia) Elly Morrow																									149
26	(Australia) Josh Anderson																									147
27	(Australia) Kyle Gurton																									137
28	(Australia) Jett Johnson	16	13	6																						108
29	(Australia) James Simpson	10	Ret	DNS																						87
30	(Australia) Zach Loscialpo																									83
31	(Australia) Shaun Richardson																									83
32	(Australia) Lee Stibbs																									51
33	(Australia) Adam Garwood	7	11	Ret																						48
34	(Australia) Tim Slade	13	Ret	DNS																						42
