= Alice Buckley (racing driver) =

Australian racing driver (born 2007)

- Nationality: (Australia) Australian
- Born: 11 July 2007 (age 19) Alberton, Queensland, Australia
- Categorisation: FIA Silver

Championship titles
- 2025: Toyota Gazoo Racing Australia Scholarship Series

Alice Buckley (born 11 July 2007) is an Australian racing driver competing for Alice Buckley Motorsport in the Super2 Series.

== Personal life ==
Buckley is the sister of Patrick Buckley, a former racing driver.

== Career ==
Buckley began karting at the age of six, competing until 2022. During her karting career, Buckley was selected to participate in the inaugural edition of the FIA Girls on Track – Rising Stars program in 2020, but wasn't able to attend due to travel restrictions. Two years later, Buckley was able to participate in the FIA Girls on Track – Rising Stars program, in which she was one of the four finalists of the Senior category.

After racing part-time in cars in 2021 and 2022, Buckley stepped up to cars full-time in 2023, racing in the Toyota Gazoo Racing Australia 86 Scholarship Series. In her first season in the series, Buckley won all three races at Queensland Raceway and scored one further podium to end the year 16th in points. During 2023, Buckley also raced in the EFS 4x4 Accessories Excel Cup and the Toyota Gazoo Racing Australia 86 Series, and also partook in the 2023–24 Toyota 86 Championship New Zealand for RaceLab Drivers Academy. In her only full-time season in the series, Buckley scored a best result of fourth at Highlands en route to a ninth-place points finish.

Remaining in Toyota one-make competition for 2024, Buckley continued racing in both the Toyota Gazoo Racing Australia GR Cup and the Toyota Gazoo Racing Australia Scholarship Series. In the former, Buckley scored a best result of ninth three times en route to a 17th-place points finish, whereas in the latter, Buckley took a lone podium in race one at Queensland Raceway by finishing second. At the end of the year, Buckley raced part-time in the 2024–25 Toyota 86 Championship New Zealand for RaceLab Academy, taking a best result of fifth in race three at Taupo.

Continuing in Toyota one-make series through 2025, Buckley returned to both the Toyota Gazoo Racing Australia GR Cup and the Toyota Gazoo Racing Australia Scholarship Series for the third consecutive year. Between the two series, Buckley found more success in the latter, taking three wins and six further podiums to seal the title at Tailem Bend. During 2025, Buckley also made select appearances in the TA2 Racing Muscle Car Series for IES Motorsport. On her debut round at the first Queensland round, Buckley scoring a pole and winning twice, before repeating the same feat two months later at the same venue. Also in 2025, Buckley raced in the final three rounds of the Australian National Trans Am Series for Six80 Racing.

Buckley stepped up to the Super2 Series the following year with her own team, with support from Matt Stone Racing. During 2026, Buckley also made select appearances in the Australian National Trans Am Series, in which she took a lone podium in Queensland.

== Karting record ==
=== Karting career summary ===
Season	Series	Team	Position
2018	Australian Kart Championship — Cadet 12		21st
2019	Australian Kart Championship — Cadet 12		24th
2020	Australian Kart Championship — KA4 Junior		9th
2021	Australian Kart Championship — KA2		26th
2022	Australian Kart Championship — KA2		51st
2022	Australian Kart Championship — KA3 Senior		49th

== Racing record ==
=== Racing career summary ===
Season	Series	Team	Races	Wins	Poles	F/Laps	Podiums	Points	Position
2021	Circuit Excel Racing Association Nationals		3	0	0	0	0		
2022	Circuit Excel Racing Association Nationals		4	0	0	0	0		13th
2023	Toyota Gazoo Racing Australia 86 Scholarship Series	Six80 Racing	15	3	1	2	4	394	16th
2023	Toyota Gazoo Racing Australia 86 Series	Six80 Racing	14	0	0	0	0	0	NC
2023	EFS 4x4 Accessories Excel Cup		13	1	0	0	2		
2023	Circuit Excel Racing Association Nationals		12	0	0	0	1		
2023	EFS 4x4 Accessories Australian Excel Cup		4	0	0	2	1	216	11th
2023–24	Toyota 86 Championship New Zealand	RaceLab Drivers Academy	18	0	0	0	0	555	9th
2024	Bathurst 6 Hour – Class D	BPRO / six80racing	1	0	0	0	0	—N/a	6th
2024	Toyota Gazoo Racing Australia GR Cup		15	0	0	0	0	654	17th
2024	Toyota Gazoo Racing Australia Scholarship Series	Six80 Racing	12	0	0	0	1		
2024–25	Toyota 86 Championship New Zealand	Race Lab Academy	6	0	0	0	0	145	27th
2025	Bathurst 6 Hour – Class D		1	0	1	0	0	—N/a	DNF
2025	Toyota Gazoo Racing Australia GR Cup		15	0	0	0	0		
2025	Toyota Gazoo Racing Australia Scholarship Series		14	3	0	1	9		1st
2025	TA2 Racing Muscle Car Series	IES Motorsport	8	4	1	3	5	357	11th
2025	Australian National Trans Am Series	Six80 Racing	7	0	0	0	0	0	NC
2026	Super2 Series	Alice Buckley Motorsport	2	0	0	0	0	60*	20th*
2026	TA2 Racing Muscle Car Series	Alice Buckley Motorsport							
2026	Australian National Trans Am Series	Alice Buckley Motorsport	6	0	0	0	1	52	19th

=== Super2 Series results ===
(key) (Race results only)

Super2 Series results
Year	Team	No.	Car	1	2	3	4	5	6	7	8	9	10	11	12	Position	Points
2026	Alice Buckley Motorsport	50	Holden Commodore ZB	SMP; R1; 15	SMP; R2; Ret	HID; R3; 15	HID; R4; 15	BAR; R5; 16	BAR; R6; 14	BAT; R9	BAT; R10	SAN; R7	SAN; R8	ADE; R11	ADE; R12	18th*	300*
