= Ben Gomersall =

Australian racing driver (born 2006)

- Nationality: (Australia) Australian
- Born: Benjamin Gomersall; 2006 (age 19–20) Gold Coast, Queensland, Australia

Benjamin Gomersall (born 2006) is an Australian racing driver who competes in the Super2 Series for Tickford Autosport.

== Personal life ==
Gomersall is the son of New Zealand entepreneur and iSeek founder Jason Gomersall, who is also an amateur racing driver and founder of Gomersall Motorsport in 2023.

== Career ==
Gomersall made his racing debut in 2021, competing in the Queensland Hyundai X3 Circuit Excel Racing Series, as well as making a one-off appearance in the Toyota Gazoo Racing Australia 86 Series. After part-time campaigns in both series the following year, Gomersall raced full-time in the Toyota Gazoo Racing Australia 86 Series in 2023, taking a best result of seventh at Tailem Bend. During 2023, Gomersall also raced part-time in the TGRA 86 Scholarship Series, in which he scored a best result of fourth at Sydney.

In 2024, Gomersall raced full-time in both the Toyota Gazoo Racing Australia GR Cup and the TGRA Scholarship Series, finishing sixth in the former's standings, and taking a lone win at Sandown in the latter. During 2024, Gomersall also won the Bathurst 6 Hour for his family team in the A2 class.

Stepping up to the Super2 Series for 2025, Gomersall joined Triple Eight Race Engineering for his maiden season in the series. In the six-round season, Gomersall took a lone third-place finish at Sydney and finished sixth in the overall standings. In parallel, Gomersall also competed for TFH Hire Racing in the TA2 Racing Muscle Car Series, scoring two overall wins at Winton and nine other podiums to secure runner-up honours in points. The following year, Gomersall switched to Tickford Autosport and Ashley Jarvis Motorsport for his second-year campaigns in Super2 and the TA2 Racing Muscle Car Series respectively. During 2026, Gomersall joined Tickford's Supercars Championship squad in a standalone wildcard entry for the Ipswich and Tailem Bend rounds.

== Racing record ==
=== Racing career summary ===
Season	Series	Team	Races	Wins	Poles	F/Laps	Podiums	Points	Position
2021	Queensland Hyundai X3 Circuit Excel Racing Series		12	0	0	0	0		
2021	Toyota Gazoo Racing Australia 86 Series		2	0	0	0	0	0	– (Note: Championship was declared null and void as not enough events were completed.)
2022	Toyota Gazoo Racing Australia 86 Series	Unit Racing	9	0	0	0	0	981	32nd
2022	Queensland Hyundai X3 Circuit Excel Racing Series		4	0	0	0	0		
2023	Toyota Gazoo Racing Australia 86 Series	Unit Racing	14	0	0	0	0		
2023	TGRA 86 Scholarship Series	AWC / Logan Group	7	0	0	0	0	452	14th
2024	Toyota Gazoo Racing Australia GR Cup	Liquorstax Racing	15	0	0	2	0	956	6th
2024	TGRA Scholarship Series	UNIT Racing	15	1	0	0	2		
2024	Hi-Tec Oils Bathurst 6 Hour – A2	Gomersall Motorsport	1	1	0	0	1	—N/a	1st
2025	Super2 Series	Triple Eight Race Engineering	12	0	0	0	1	1035	6th
2025	TA2 Racing Muscle Car Series	TFH Hire Racing	21	3	1	2	13	906	2nd
2025	Australian National Trans Am Series	TFH Hire Racing	8	0	0	0	0	28	30th
2026	Super2 Series	Tickford Autosport	4	0	0	0	2	414*	6th*
2026	TA2 Racing Muscle Car Series	Ashley Jarvis Motorsport	7	0	0	0	3	95*	5th*
2026	Australian National Trans Am Series	Ashley Jarvis Motorsport	3	0	0	0	0	11	33rd
2026	Hi-Tec Oils Bathurst 6 Hour – A2	Gomersall Motorsport	1	0	0	0	0	—N/a	DNF
2026	Supercars Championship	Tickford Racing						*	*

* Season still in progress.

=== Super2 Series results ===
(key) (Race results only)

Super2 Series results
Year	Team	Car	1	2	3	4	5	6	7	8	9	10	11	12	Position	Points
2025	Triple Eight Race Engineering	Holden Commodore ZB	SMP; R1; 6	SMP; R2; 3	SYM; R3; 9	SYM; R4; 15	TOW; R5; 10	TOW; R6; 11	QLD; R7; 9	QLD; R8; 8	BAT; R9; 17	BAT; R10; 12	ADE; R11; 5	ADE; R12; 6	6th	1035
2026	Tickford Autosport	Ford Mustang S550	SMP; R1; 6	SMP; R2; 2	HID; R3; 3	HID; R4; 20	BAR; R5; 3	BAR; R6; 4	BAT; R9	BAT; R10	SAN; R7	SAN; R8	ADE; R11	ADE; R12	5th*	663*
