= 2024 Hi-Tec Oils Bathurst 6 Hour =

Endurance motorsports race in Bathurst, Australia

The 2024 Hi-Tec Oils Bathurst 6 Hour was an endurance race for Group 3E Series Production Cars. The race was held at the Mount Panorama Circuit, Bathurst, New South Wales, Australia on 31 March 2024. It was the eighth annual Bathurst 6 Hour.

The race was won by Simon Hodges, Jayden Ojeda and George Miedecke driving a BMW M4; Hodges and Ojeda's second 6 Hour win in a row.

Car #710, a 1998-model Toyota Camry, became the first car to compete in both the Bathurst 1000 and Bathurst 6 Hour – it previously failed to finish the 1998 Super Touring 1000.

== Classes ==
Cars competed in the following classes:

Symbol	Class
X	Ultimate Performance
A1	Extreme Performance Forced Induction
A2	Extreme Performance Naturally Aspirated
B1	High Performance Forced Induction
B2	High Performance Naturally Aspirated
C	Performance
D	Production
E	Compact

== Results ==
Pos.	Class	No.	Team	Drivers	Car	Laps
1	X	1	Secure Wealth Advisers	Simon Hodges; Jayden Ojeda; George Miedecke	BMW M4 F82	123
2	X	92	Race for a Cure/Garth Walden Racing	Ben Kavich; Michael Kavich; Thomas Randle	BMW M2 Competition	123
3	X	23	Bruce Lynton BMW	Beric Lynton; Tim Leahey; Will Davison	BMW M3 F80 Competition	123
4	A1	222	Harding Performance	Cem Yucel; Iain Salteri	Volkswagen Golf R	123
5	A2	30	Gomersall Motorsport	Jason Gomersall; Aaron Seton; Ben Gomersall	Ford Mustang Mach 1	122
6	X	27	Sherrin Rentals	Grant Sherrin; Iain Sherrin	BMW M4 F82	122
7	A2	16	Levitt Motorsports	Tony Levitt; Luke King	Mercedes-Benz C 63 AMG	122
8	A1	91	Team Nineteen	Mark Griffith; Nash Morris	Mercedes-Benz A 45 AMG	122
9	X	81	McLennan Motorsport	Tom McLennan; David Russell; Shane Smollen	BMW M4 F82	120
10	B1	999	Team Buccini Racing	Karlie Buccini; Courtney Prince; Suzanne Palermo	BMW 135i	120
11	A2	48	ASAP Marketing	Scott Gore; Steve Owen	Lexus RC F	120
12	A2	64	Statewide Oil	Chris Lillis; Josh Muggleton; Nathan Callaghan	Chevrolet Camaro ZL1	120
13	B1	143	One Four Three Motorsport	Harrison Inwood; Grant Inwood; Darcy Inwood	Subaru Impreza WRX STI	119
14	B1	28	On Track Motorsport	Peter O’Donnell; Matt Chahda; Garry Mennell	BMW 335i	118
15	C	46	ARES Group Racing	Pieter Faulkner; Matt Slavin	HSV VXR Turbo	117
16	D	22	MW Racing	Mitchell Wooller; Tim Barwick	Toyota 86 GTS	117
17	D	2	Voodoo Motorsport	Andrew McMaster; David Noble; David Worrell	BMW 125i	116
18	D	55	Fifth Gear Motoring	Matt Thewlis; Christophe Heiniger	Toyota 86 GTS	116
19	A2	12	Debeers Refinish	Greg Keam; Justin Matthews	Ford Mustang Mach 1	116
20	D	80	Ric Shaw Racing	Ric Shaw; Tom Shaw; David Cox	Mazda RX-8	115
21	D	87	JGI Racing	Summer Rintoule; Hunter Robb; Tayler Bryant	Toyota 86 GTS	115
22	B1	105	Camel Toe Racing	John Fitzgerald; Aaron Zerefos; Brent Howard	BMW 135i	114
23	C	31	Osborne Motorsport	Jackson Rice; Cody McKay	Renault Mégane RS 265	114
24	X	118	D.A. Campbell Transport	Dean Campbell; Cameron Crick	BMW M2 Competition	114
25	C	15	FG Motorsport	Chris Gunther; Mitchell Randall	BMW 130i	113
26	D	50	six80racing	Alice Buckley; Jack Wood; Jaylyn Robotham	Toyota 86 GTS	112
27	E	20	Beller Motorsport	Andrew Jackman; Mark Taubitz; Jamie Westaway	Mazda 3 SP25	111
28	X	10	Riskie Racing	Brock Giblin; Brandon Madden	HSV VF GTS	111
29	A1	93	Waltec Motorsport	Kent Quinn; Kynan Yu; Paul Blomqvist	BMW M2 Competition	109
30	D	82	Maisie Place Motorsport	Nigel Hanley; Andy Duffin; Liam Duffin	Mazda RX-8	109
31	C	84	AC Store	James Hay; Paul Ansell; Michael Learoyd	Volkswagen Scirocco R	107
32	C	77	MRPS Lolar AED	Patrick Navin; Nathan Halstead	Volkswagen Scirocco R	107
33	D	710	710 Motorsport	Russell Greaves; Darren Goddard; Shane Logan	Toyota Camry	100
34	E	35	RaceAway Track Time	Scott Tidyman; Ben Shaw; Seth Gilmore	Mazda 3 SP25	95
35	E	161	RaceAway Track Time	Tom Gardiner; Calvin Gardiner; Wil Longmore	Mazda 3 SP25	87
36	C	90	Rent4Race	Cameron Laws; Elliot Cleary; Cody Gillis	BMW 330i	82
37	A1	71	Team Buccini Racing	Paul Buccini; Jett Johnson; Michael Von Rappard	BMW M140i	63
DNF	A1	66	Fullgas Racing	Dimitri Agathos; Harry Hayek	Subaru Impreza WRX STI	111
DNF	X	24	Garth Walden Racing	Michael Auld; Brianna Wilson; Tyler Everingham	BMW M3 F80 Competition	111
DNF	A1	971	Team Buccini Racing	Patrick Barnett; Peter Bray; Timothy McDonald	BMW M135i Hatch F20	110
DNF	A2	7	Keltic Racing	Tony Quinn; Ryder Quinn; Grant Denyer	Ford Mustang Mach 1	99
DNF	B2	19	Axis Surveys	Richard Shinkfield; Ettore Vosolo; Chris Holdt	BMW M3 F80 Coupe	98
DNF	D	42	Team Integra	Brian Smith; Rob Zoanetti; Kim Andersen	Honda Integra Type S	97
DNF	A2	29	Razztech Motorsports	Paul Razum; Brayden Willmington; Brad Vaughan	HSV VF ClubSport R8	86
DNF	D	75	Re-Max Property Sales	Matthew Dicinoski; Gerritt van de Pol; Stuart Vaughan	Volkswagen Golf GTi	72
DNF	A1	14	Loiacono Motorsport	Oliver Loiacono; Liam Loiacono	Mitsubishi Lancer RS Evo X	66
DNF	D	86	Beller Motorsport	Cameron Beller; Adam Brewer; Emanuel Mezzasalma	Toyota 86 GTS	60
DNF	A1	45	Wolfbrook Motorsport	Steve Brooks; Bill Riding; Glen Chappel	Mercedes-Benz A 45 AMG	57
DNF	A2	51	IES Motorsport	Graham Cheney; Paul Hadley; Tyler Cheney	Ford Mustang Mach 1	48
DNF	A1	88	GRW Retail	Graeme Wakefield; Ian Mewett; Craig Allan	Mitsubishi Lancer RS Evo X	37
DNF	A1	9	Parramatta Vehicle Services	Hadrian Morrall; Tyler Mecklem	Ford Mustang Mach 1	31
DNF	X	96	Fierce Racing	Rob Rubis; Jordan Cox; Scott Turner	BMW M4 F82	25
DNF	A2	25	CK Motorsports	Lindsay Kearns; Jake Camilleri; Scott Nicholas	Ford Mustang GT	24
DNF	E	76	Troy Williams Motorsport	Matthew Powell; Liam Moyse; David Ling	Mazda 3 SP25	22
DNF	C	78	PB Motorsport Services	Troy Derwent; Oskar Butt; Michael Ferns	HSV VXR Turbo	18
DNF	A2	121	Century 21	Chris Delfsma; Rylan Gray; Ryan Casha	Ford Mustang GT	16
DNF	C	43	Champ Group	Ian Cowley; Steve McHugh; Adam Talbert	HSV VXR Turbo	11
DNF	A1	69	Brown Davis Motorsport	Ashley Wright; John Bowe; David Brown	Ford Focus RS LZ	7
DNS	C	13	Osborne Motorsport	Colin Osborne; Rick Bates; Zach Bates	Renault Mégane RS 265	
