= Trans-Am racing in Australia =

There are two separately organised and run Australian motor racing series featuring cars designed and built for the TA2 class of the American Trans-Am series.

While independently run, both series feature almost identical technical regulations and cars used for one series can be used for the other.

== TA2 racing cars in Australia ==
The TA2 racing cars used in Australia are manufactured by Howe Racing Enterprises and use a standardised Chevrolet LS3 race engine prepared by McLaren Motor Engineering, a South Australian-based engineering firm (unrelated to the British McLaren Group). Other TA2 chassis and engines used in the US are not permitted in either Australian racing series. The regulations for both series specify that most components of the cars must be unmodified and replacement parts purchased from the distributor of the cars, PBR Distributions. PBR Distributions, along with the TA2 Racing Muscle Car Series, were sold by the category founder, Peter Robinson, to a consortium of regular competitors in 2024.

The cars used in both series series are identical spaceframe chassis built by Howe Racing Enterprises and use a modified GM LS3 engine prepared by McLaren Motor Engineering, a South Australian motor reconditioning and preparation firm (unrelated to the British McLaren Group).

The engine produces 525 horsepower (390 kW), with a four-speed H-pattern manual transmission, which is unusual in modern racing vehicles that typically use a sequential manual transmission or a semi-automatic transmission. For 2025, teams will have the option of running one of two gearboxes, one made by G-Force and another by Holinger, with the Holinger reported be more expensive but more durable when used aggressively. The minimum weight of the cars (including driver) is 1250 kilograms, making the cars somewhat large and heavy for dedicated racing vehicles. The power and weight figures are roughly similar to Group GT3 racing vehicles.

The cars feature fibreglass bodies that resemble either the Ford Mustang, Chevrolet Camaro or Dodge Challenger; the underlying chassis and engine of the cars is the same regardless of the body. The cars reportedly produce around 100 kg of aerodynamic downforce at the rear, which aids cornering speeds, but is much lower than many sports car classes (a road-registerable Porsche 911 GT3 RS is capable of producing a total of 860 kg of downforce at its top speed

The cross-ply tyres are supplied by Hoosier Racing Tire. Only one type of slick, and one rain tire, are permitted for use, and a limited number of tyres are supplied by the category manager for each race meeting. The use of cross-ply tires is to make the racing more entertaining, as the inferior tyre performance (as compared to more modern radial tyres) makes the cars more difficult to drive and makes managing tire wear important for drivers.

The cars have disc brakes with control brake pads and discs supplied by the distributor. Like most racing categories, they do not use any electronic driving aids such as anti-lock brakes or traction control.

Lap records for Australian TA2 cars are generally slightly faster than TCR, but significantly slower than Porsche Carrera Cup or the Supercars Championship

== TA2 muscle car series ==
The TA2 Racing Muscle Car Series has run annually since 2017, and is the featured category in the Hi-Tec Oils Super Series, a series of race meetings sanctioned by the Australian Auto Sport Alliance.

The races are televised nationally on the free-to-air network SBS.

== Trans-Am Series ==
The Australian National Trans-Am Series (currently known as the Trico Trans-Am Series after its naming right sponsor) is run by Australian Racing Group (ARG) and is sanctioned by Motorsport Australia.

ARG is the exclusive Australian licensee of Trans-Am trademarks, and hence is able to use the name in the series they run.

It has run annually since 2020 as part of the SpeedSeries, a series of circuit racing events run by ARG, also featuring the TCR Australia Touring Car Series and other support categories. It is televised and live-streamed on the Seven Network and its associated streaming service.
