= Jett Johnson =

American football linebacker (born 1999)

Current position
- Title: Linebacker analyst
- Team: Mississippi State Bulldogs
- Conference: Southeastern Conference

Biographical details
- Born: June 29, 1999 (age 27)

Playing career
- 2018–2023: Mississippi State
- Position: Linebacker

Coaching career (HC unless noted)
- 2024–2025: UConn (DGA/assistant LB)
- 2026–present: Mississippi State (LB analyst)

Accomplishments and honors

Awards
- As a player: Second-team All-SEC (2023)

Jett Doxey Johnson (born June 29, 1999) is an American football coach and former linebacker. He played college football for the Mississippi State Bulldogs. He is currently a linebacker analyst at his alma mater, Mississippi State.

== Early life ==
Johnson attended Tupelo High School in Tupelo, Mississippi. While there, he played high school football. As a sophomore, he posted 155 tackles with five being for a loss, six sacks, and three interceptions. In his junior season, Johnson notched 145 tackles with seven for a loss, three and a half sacks, and two interceptions. Coming out of high school, he was rated as a three-star recruit and committed to play college football for the Mississippi State Bulldogs.

== College career ==
Johnson made two tackles in two games as a true freshman in 2018 before taking a redshirt in 2019. In 2020 he played in five games, making three tackles with half a tackle being for a loss. In week 3 of the 2021 season, Johnson notched nine tackles, a pass deflection, and a forced fumble versus NC State. In the 2021 regular season finale, he posted 11 tackles with one being for a loss, and an interception, as he helped the Bulldogs beat rival Ole Miss. In 2021, Johnson played in 13 games with six starts, where he recorded 86 tackles with six being for a loss, two fumble recoveries, and an interception en route to being named third-team all-SEC by Pro Football Focus.

During the 2022 season, he recorded a conference-leading 115 tackles with eight and a half being for a loss, two sacks, two pass deflections, and two fumble recoveries. In week 2 of the 2023 season, Johnson was named the SEC co-defensive player of the week after tallying 11 tackles with two being for a loss, a sack, and two interceptions in an overtime win over Arizona. In week 12, he intercepted a pass which he lateraled to teammate Marcus Banks who walked in for a touchdown, as he helped the Bulldogs beat Southern Miss. Johnson finished the 2023 season with 130 tackles, six sacks, three interceptions, and two forced fumbles.

== Professional career ==
Pre-draft measurables
Height	Weight	Arm length	Hand span	20-yard shuttle	Three-cone drill	Vertical jump	Broad jump	Bench press
6 ft 1 3/4 in (1.87 m)	240 lb (109 kg)	31 in (0.79 m)	9 in (0.23 m)	4.62 s	7.72 s	30.5 in (0.77 m)	8 ft 9 in (2.67 m)	17 reps
All values from Pro Day

== Coaching career ==
=== UConn ===
Johnson was hired as a defensive graduate assistant at UConn.

=== Mississippi State ===
On January 8, 2026, Johnson was hired as a linebacker analyst at his alma mater, Mississippi State.
