= Speedcafe =

Australian motorsport news website

- Website type: Motorsport news Classifieds
- Available in: English
- Website: www.speedcafe.com
- Commercial: Yes
- Launched: 23 October 2009
- Current status: Online

Speedcafe.com is an Australian-based motorsport news website that launched on 23 October 2009. The site had over 50 million page views in 2020.

Speedcafe.com is a source of news and race reports for the Supercars Championship, Formula One, and other categories.

Domestic coverage includes GT World Challenge Australia, SuperUtes Series, Porsche Carrera Cup Australia Championship, and TCR Australia. The site also covers international categories including MotoGP, World Rally Championship, FIA World Endurance Championship and NASCAR.

Speedcafe.com has offshoot sites with its own Classifieds and Jobstop brands. The website is also a major partner of the Australian Motor Sport Hall of Fame. In 2019 Speedcafe launched the performance motoring website Torquecafe.com

In August 2022, it was announced founder Brett Murray had sold a majority 80% stake of the publication to a consortium made up of Karl Begg, Richard Gresham and Robert Gooley.

== Contributors ==
Andrew van Leeuwen is Speedcafe's Editorial Director and Stefan Bartholomaeus is the Managing Editor.

Former staff members include Connor O'Brien, Tom Howard, Grant Rowley, Gordon Lomas, Damien Smy, Mat Coch, Daniel Herrero, Slade Perrins and Iwan Jones

== Controversy ==
Speedcafe.com was featured in a 2012 episode of Media Watch that investigated then-owner Brett "Crusher" Murray for the conflict of interest between parent company BAM Media and his work as a columnist for the Gold Coast Bulletin.
