= Auto Action =

Australian motorsport magazine

- Cover of the April 2025 issue
- Editor: Bruce Williams
- Categories: Motorsport
- Frequency: Fortnightly
- Publisher: Auto Action Media
- First issue: 24 February 1971
- Country: Australia
- Based in: Oakleigh, Victoria
- Language: English
- Website: autoaction.com.au
- ISSN: 2204-9924

Auto Action is an Australian motorsport magazine established in 1971.

It is known for its in-depth coverage of domestic and international racing, Auto Action reports on categories including Supercars, Formula 1, MotoGP, NASCAR, GT racing, TCR, and grassroots motorsport. The publication is based in Melbourne and delivers news through its print magazine, digital platforms, and podcasts.

== History ==
Auto Action was launched in 1971 by Syme Magazines (part of The Age). Initially a fortnightly newspaper-style tabloid, it quickly became a staple of the Australian motorsport scene, covering major series such as the Australian Touring Car Championship, Formula One, and international events featuring Australian drivers or deemed of interest to Australians. There was also a big focus on the domestic racing scene, from significant club level competitions to national events.

In the mid 1990’s Auto Action along with a number of other Syme Magazines including Motorcycle News, 4X4 Australia was purchased by ACP Magazines, which started a new business called ACP Action. During this time of ownership, the publication changed size and format and became a weekly publication.

Throughout its history, Auto Action built a reputation for sharp news reporting, race analysis, and hard-hitting commentary. Its editorial team has included prominent motorsport journalists such as Bruce Williams, Andrew Clarke, Mark Fogarty, Paul Gover and Bruce Newton. Auto Action has also gained a reputation for launching the journalistic careers after many now in the Automotive and motorsport media.

After several group ownership changes, including periods under Bauer Media, Auto Action was purchased in 2016 by long time Auto Action advertising manager Bruce Williams.

There was an increased focus on growing its digital presence at www.autoaction.com.au with regular news updates, race reports, and feature stories, and the fortnightly magazine continued in print.

Today, Williams has been joined by Andrew Clarke in the running Auto Action, which now features a high-quality print magazine as well as its digital platform and other new media.

== Content and Coverage ==
Auto Action specialises in motorsport news, focusing on:

- Supercars Championship — providing detailed reports, news, driver interviews, and technical analysis.
- Formula 1 and International Racing — covering F1, NASCAR, IndyCar, WEC, and other global categories with an emphasis on Australian and New Zealand drivers.
- Motorcycle Racing — including MotoGP, World Superbikes, and ASBK.
- Grassroots Motorsport — club racing, historic racing, rallying, and emerging categories.

== Ownership and Management ==
Auto Action is independently owned Auto Action Media, which is in turn owned by Bruce Williams, Andrew Clarke and Betty Klimenko, with Williams and Clarke the directors of the business. The publication remains one of the few dedicated motorsport news outlets in Australia, with a regular print edition - Auto Action Premium - publishing monthly.
