= Howe Racing Enterprises =

Auto racing team

- Company type: Incorporation
- Industry: Automotive
- Founded: 1971
- Founder: Ed Howe; Chas Howe
- Headquarters: Beaverton, Michigan
- Website: http://www.howeracing.com/

Howe Racing Enterprises is a manufacturer of stock car racing chassis producing oval racing chassis as well as Trans-Am Series chassis.

== History ==
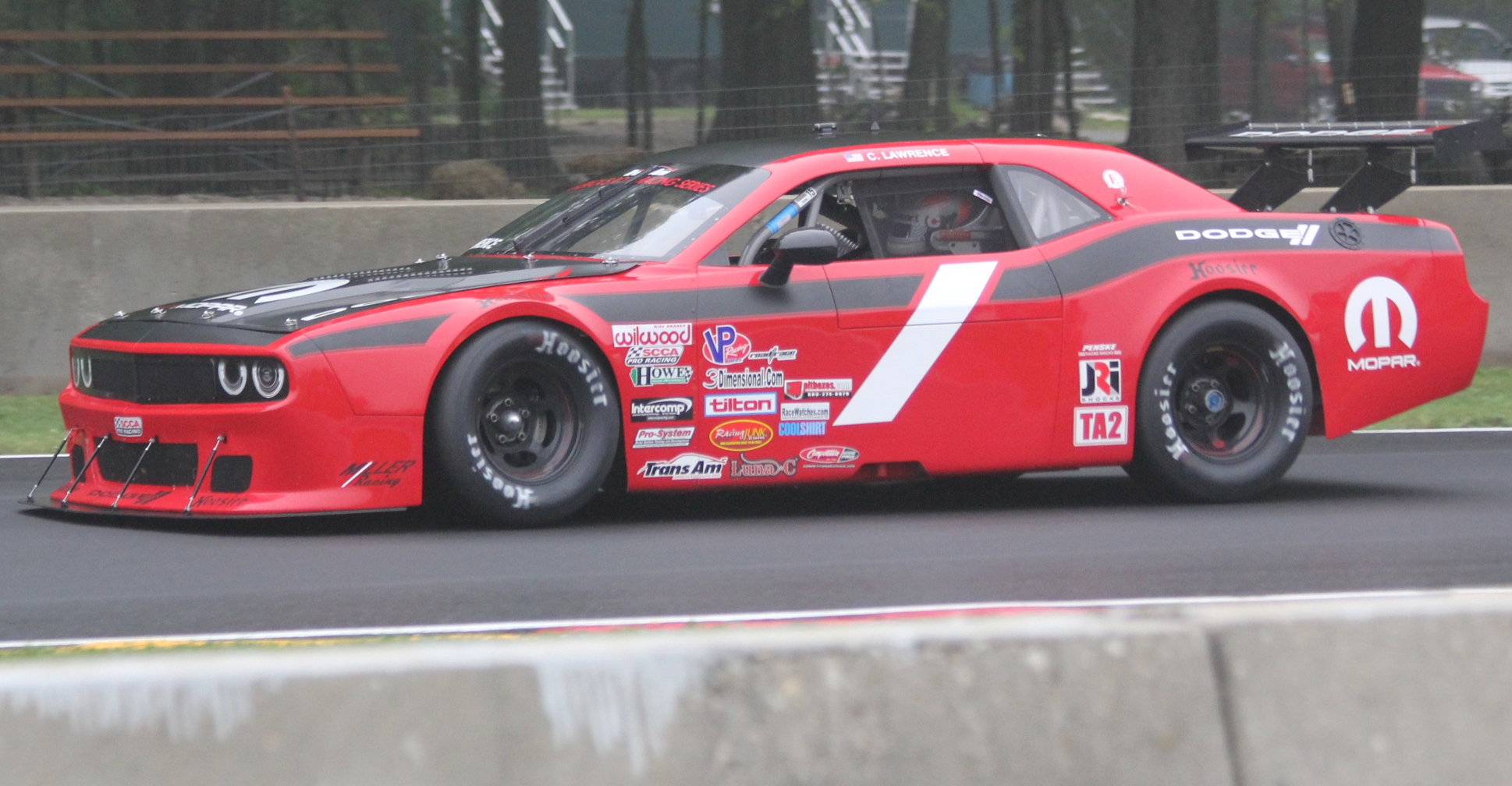
A Howe built Dodge Challenger TA2 spec car in 2015.

Howe Racing Enterprises was founded by former racing drivers Ed Howe. His son, Chas, also a former driver, now runs the business. Both drivers competed frequently in the American Speed Association National Tour as well as other oval racing series. Ed Howe founded his chassis manufacturing company in 1971 in his hometown of Beaverton, Michigan. Ed Howe introduced the off-set chassis to the prestigious Snowball Derby in 1972. With a better weight distribution to the standard stockcars used in the southern States, Howe started the race from pole position. The Michigan native won the race, beating NASCAR regulars such as Darrell Waltrip and Donnie Allison. In 1977 the facility expanded with a 1/6th short track oval. Throughout the years Howe produce many modified and late model chassis. The company also supported many drivers such as Mike Eddy in the ASA National Tour and CRA Super Series.

In 2005 Howe became one of three approved chassis builders for the ARCA Truck Series. Series veteran John Kasmierski received the first chassis to achieve two top five finishes during the season. The following season Paul Hahn won the championship racing a Howe chassis with a Chevrolet Colorado body. For 2010 Howe introduced a new chassis for the Sweden-based Camaro Cup. The fifth generation Chevrolet Camaro was a success and continues to race in the Swedish championship. An adapted version of the Camaro Cup car was run in SCCA club racing and the Trans-Am Series. The chassis can be fitted with various American muscle car bodies such as the Dodge Challenger and Ford Mustang.
