= Dodge Challenger =

Muscle car produced by Dodge

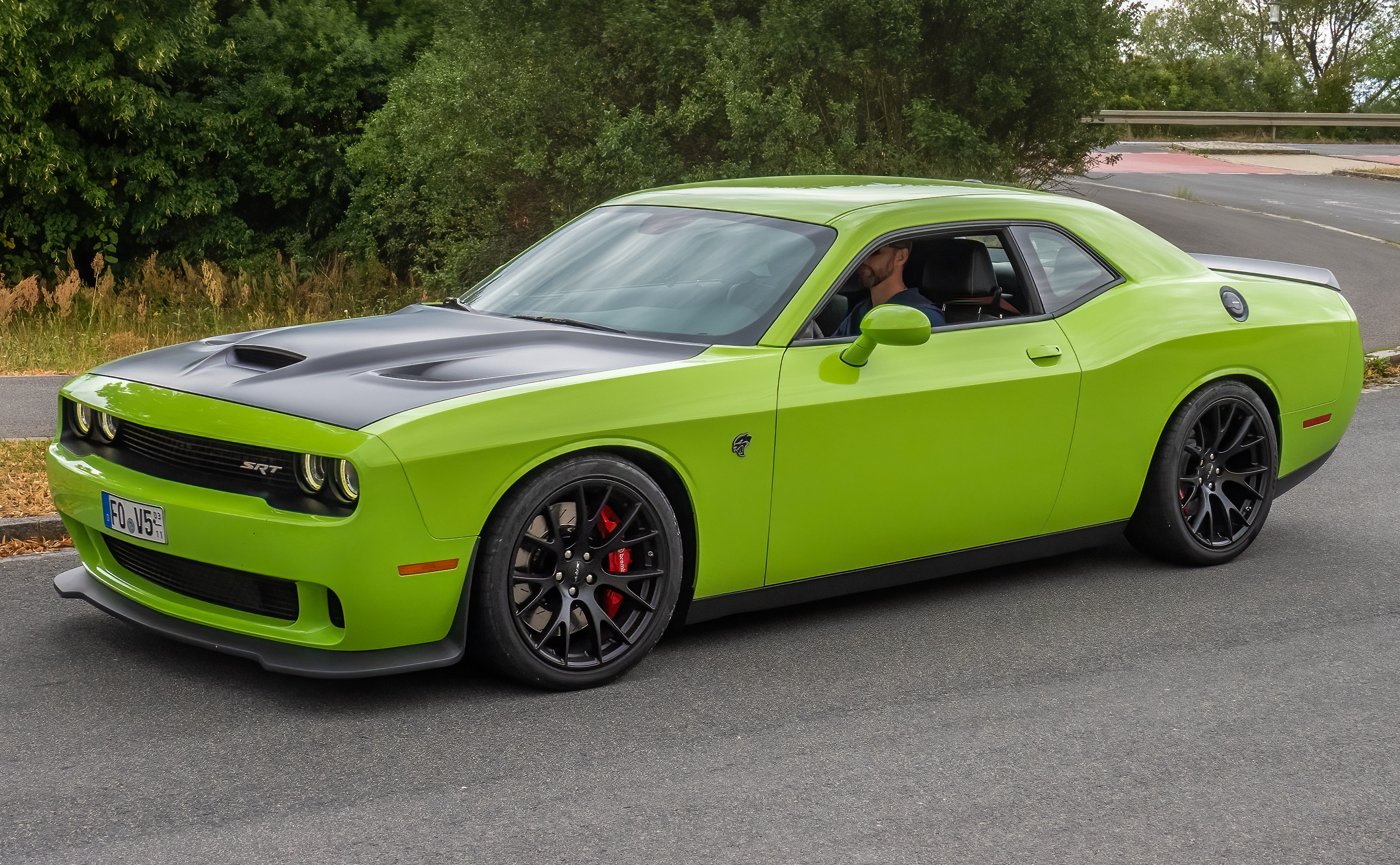
- 2015 Dodge Challenger SRT Hellcat

Overview
- Manufacturer: Dodge (Note: Chrysler Corporation (1969–1974); Mitsubishi Motors (1978–1983); Chrysler LLC (2008–2009); Chrysler Group LLC (2009–2014); FCA US LLC (2014–2021); Stellantis North America (2021–2023))
- Production: 1969–1974; 1977–1983; 2008–2023
- Model years: 1970–1974; 1978–1983; 2008–2023

The Dodge Challenger is the name of three generations of automobiles produced by the American automobile manufacturer Dodge. However, the first use of the Challenger name by Dodge dates back to 1959 for marketing a "value version" of the full-sized Coronet Silver Challenger.

From model years 1970 to 1974, the first-generation Dodge Challenger pony car was built using the Chrysler E platform in hardtop and convertible body styles sharing significant components with the Plymouth Barracuda.

The second generation, from model years 1978 to 1983, was a rebadged Mitsubishi Galant Lambda / Sapporo, a coupe version of an economical compact car.

The third and most recent generation is a full-size muscle car that was introduced in early 2008 initially as a rival to the evolved fifth generation Ford Mustang and the fifth generation Chevrolet Camaro.

In November 2021, Stellantis announced that the 2023 model year would be the final model year for both the LD Dodge Charger and LA Dodge Challenger, as the company planned to shift its focus toward electric vehicles amid tougher emissions standards required by the Environmental Protection Agency. Challenger production ended on December 22, 2023. The successor-generation Dodge Charger was subsequently introduced as a multi-energy model with both battery-electric and internal-combustion powertrains, while it remained uncertain whether the Challenger nameplate would return. Stellantis later reassessed its electrification strategy. In February 2026, the company said that it had overestimated the pace of the energy transition and that future electrification would proceed at a pace governed by customer demand, while announcing approximately €22.2 billion in charges associated with a broader business reset that included significantly reduced expectations for battery-electric vehicles.

== First generation (1970–1974) ==
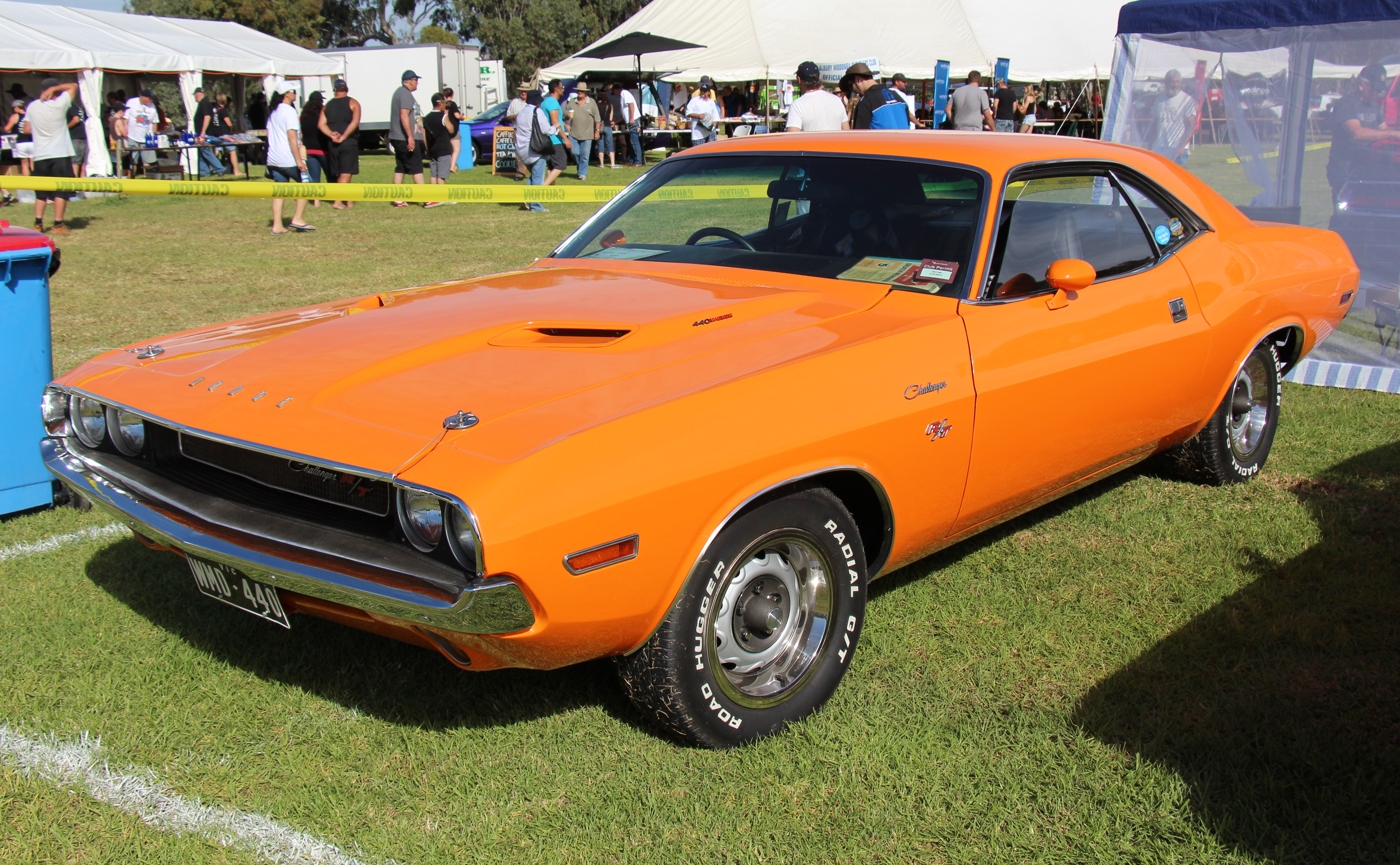

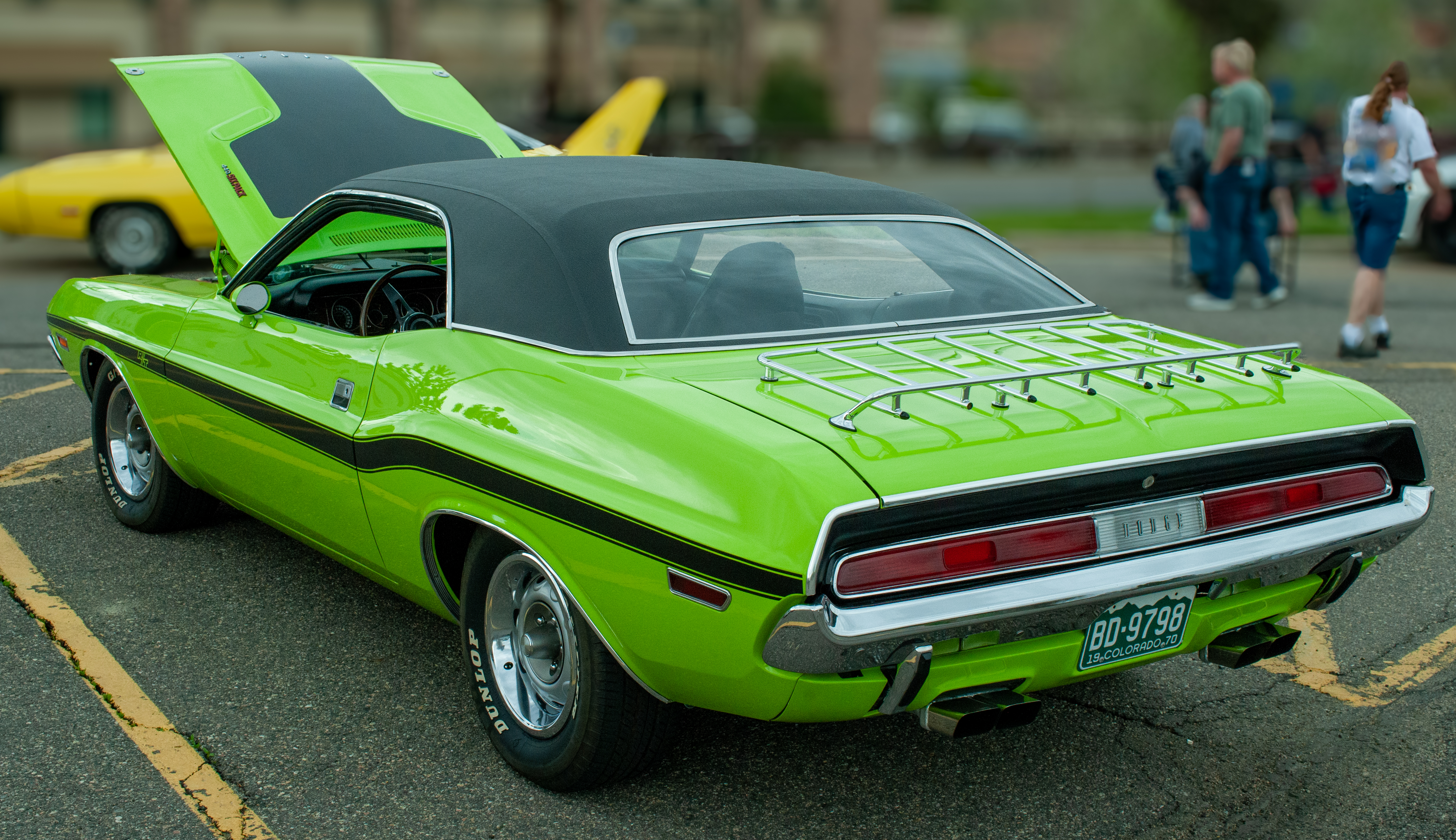
Dodge Challenger (first generation)

The E-body Challenger was introduced in the autumn of 1969 for the 1970 model year, similar in appearance to but somewhat larger than its less expensive, platform-sharing Plymouth sibling, the Barracuda. It was positioned to compete against the Mercury Cougar and Pontiac Firebird in the upper end of the pony car market, a large and lucrative niche of two-door sport coupes that the Ford Mustang had pioneered in April 1964. Like the Barracuda, it was available in a wide variety of trim and option levels. In spite of its premium price, size, and market placement, Chrysler intended the new Challenger to be the most potent pony car ever, and virtually every engine in its inventory (including the famed 426 Hemi) was made available.

While the vehicle was all new, Dodge had used the Challenger name in 1959 for the Silver Challenger, a limited-production two-door coupe based on the fourth-generation Dodge Coronet.

The 1970 Challenger's longer wheelbase, larger dimensions, and more luxurious interior than the Mustang or its smaller Chrysler products stablemate, the Barracuda, were prompted by the launch of the upscale 1967 Mercury Cougar, a bigger, better appointed, and more expensive pony car aimed at affluent young American buyers. The 110 in (2,800 mm) wheelbase was 2 in (51 mm) longer than the Barracuda's, and the Dodge differed in its sheet metal, much as the Cougar differed from the shorter-wheelbase Mustang. Air conditioning and a rear window defogger were optional. With 1971 being the sole exception, the front ends of both cars differed from each other in that the Challenger had four headlights and the Barracuda had only two.

The exterior design was penned by Carl Cameron, who was also responsible for the exterior designs of the 1966 Dodge Charger. Cameron based the 1970 Challenger grille on an older sketch of a stillborn 1966 Charger prototype that was to have a turbine engine. The pony car segment was already declining by the time the Challenger arrived. Sales were excellent initially, with 76,925 units moved in the model's debut year, but fell dramatically after 1970. Though sales rose for the 1973 model year with over 27,800 cars being sold, Challenger production ceased midway through the 1974 model year. A total of 165,437 first-generation Challengers were sold.

== Second generation (1978–1983) ==
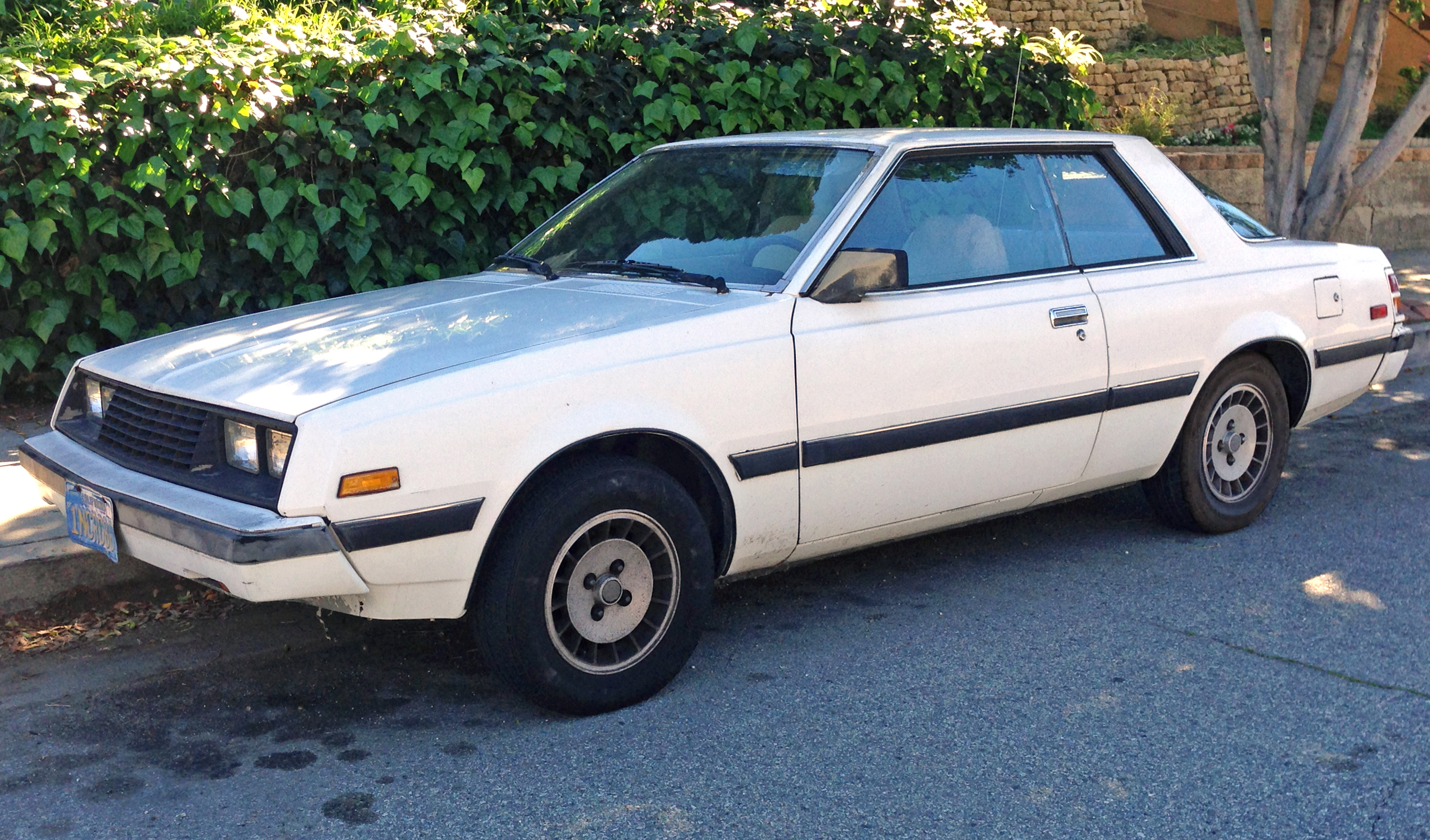

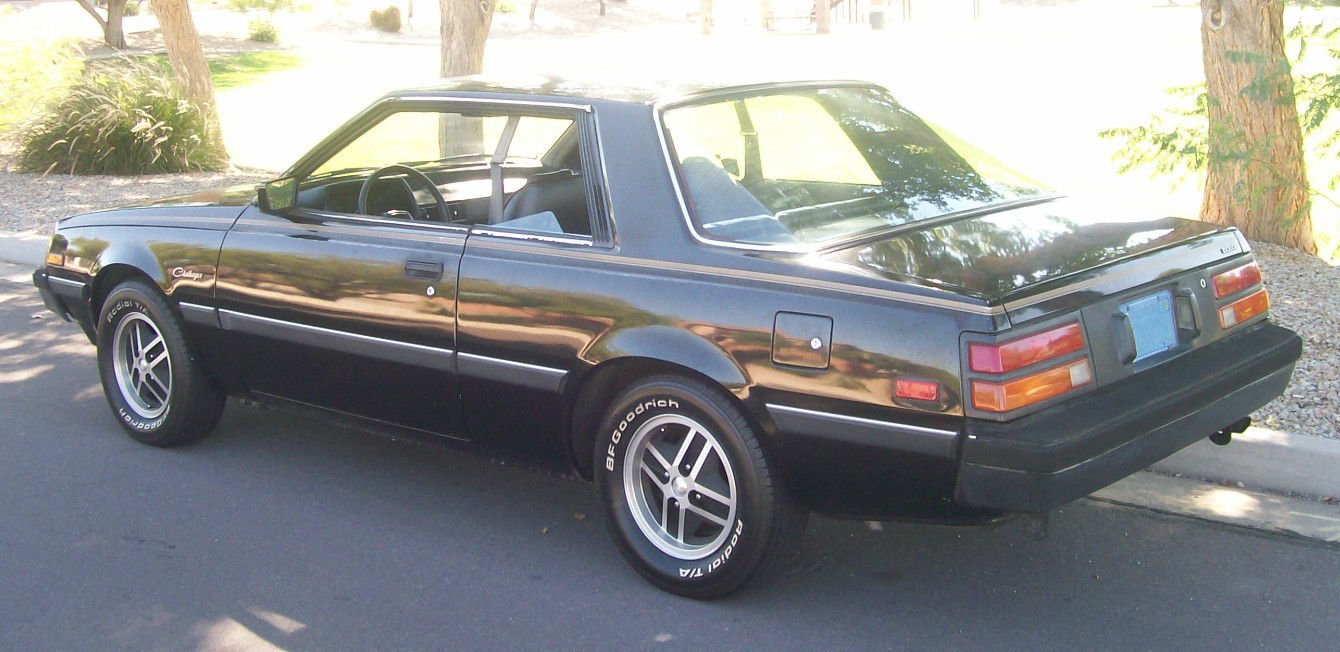
Dodge Challenger (second generation)

Beginning with the 1978 model year, Dodge marketed a rebadged variant of the early Mitsubishi Galant Lambda coupe as the Dodge Challenger — through Dodge dealers as a captive import, initially as the "Dodge Colt Challenger". Chrysler's Plymouth brand marketed its rebadged variant as the Plymouth Sapporo, and a rebadged variant was marketed and sold overseas as the Mitsubishi Sapporo/Scorpion.

The Sapporo and Challenger were redesigned in 1981 with revised bodywork with increased foot room, headroom, trunk capacity, and soundproofing. Both cars were marketed until 1983, when they were replaced by the Conquest using the same rear-wheel-drive platform through 1989, and in 1984 by the front-wheel-drive Laser and Daytona.

The car retained the frameless hardtop styling of the old Challenger, but had smaller engines, a 1.6 L inline-four and a 2.6 L inline-four instead of the slant-6 and V8 engines of the original Challenger models. The engines were rated at power outputs of 77–105 hp (57–78 kW). Mitsubishi pioneered the use of balance shafts to help damp engine vibrations.

== Third generation (2008–2023) ==
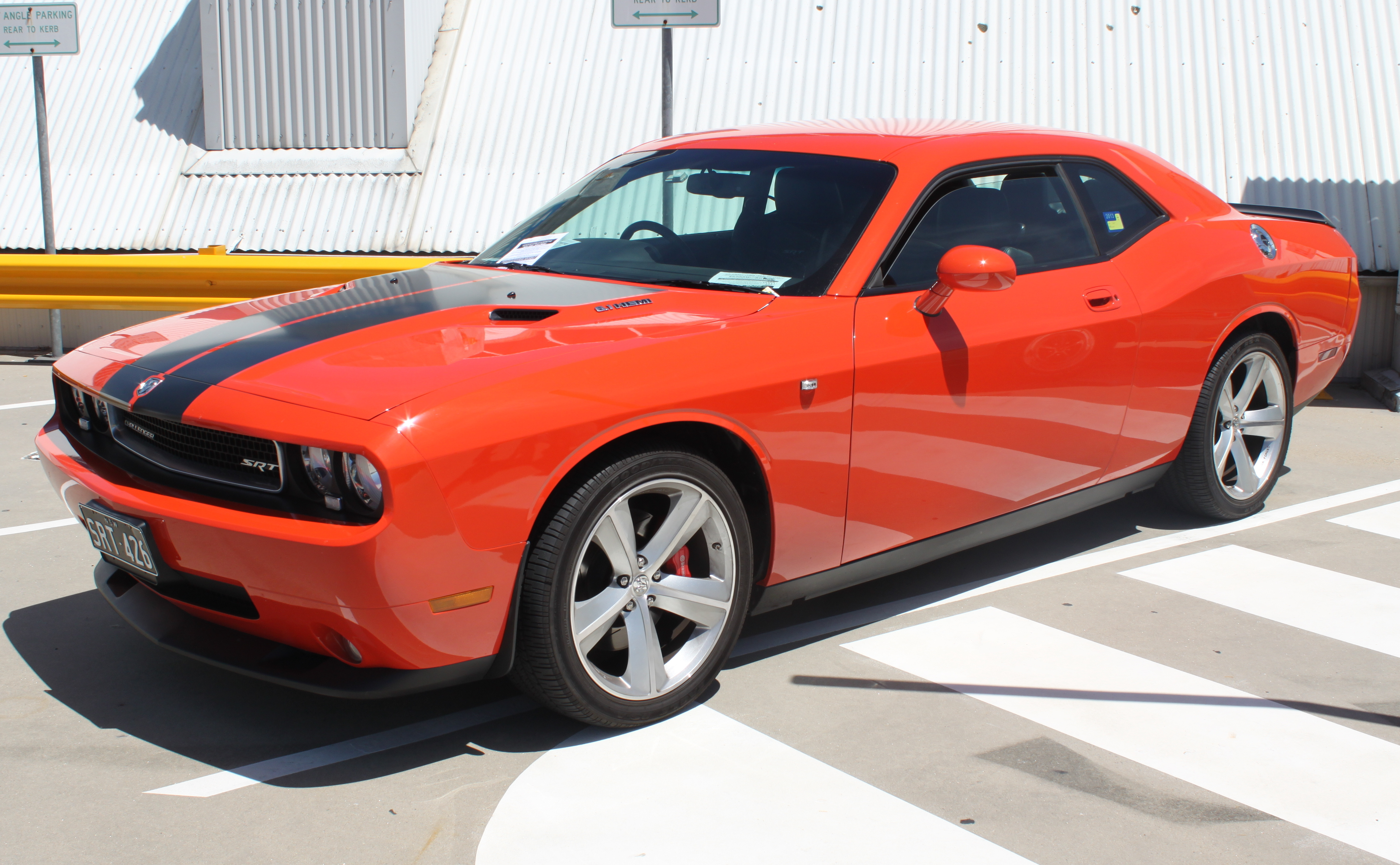

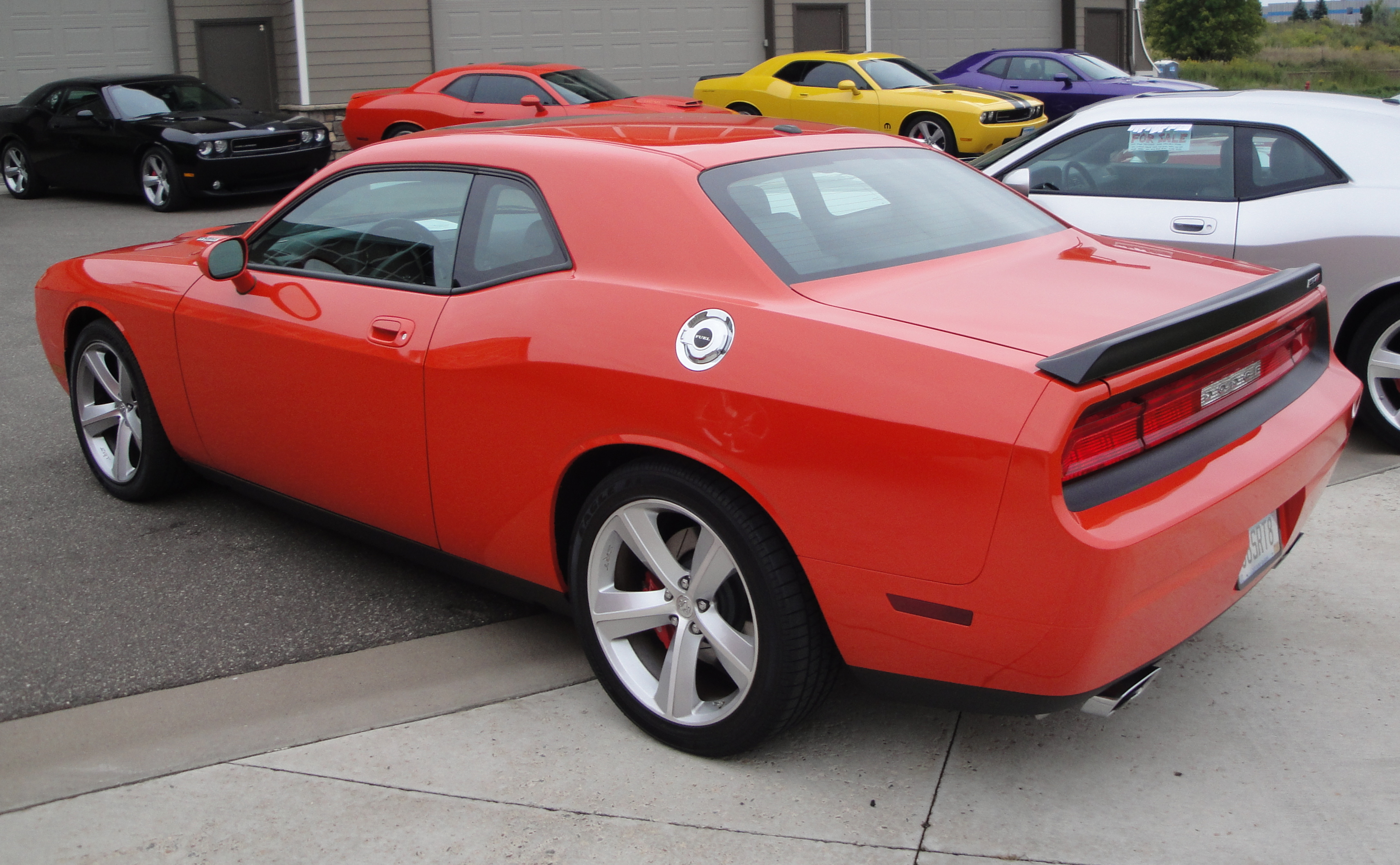
Dodge Challenger (third generation)

In late 2005, Dodge teased spy photos of the third-generation Dodge Challenger prototype on the internet, which was announced on November 21, 2005, with an official sketch of the vehicle. The Dodge Challenger Concept was unveiled at the 2006 North American International Auto Show; production started in 2008. Many design cues of the Dodge Challenger Concept were adapted from the 1970 Dodge Challenger R/T. The LC chassis that it sits on is a modified (shortened wheelbase) version of the LX platform that underpins the Dodge Charger (LX), Dodge Magnum, and the Chrysler 300.

== Racing ==
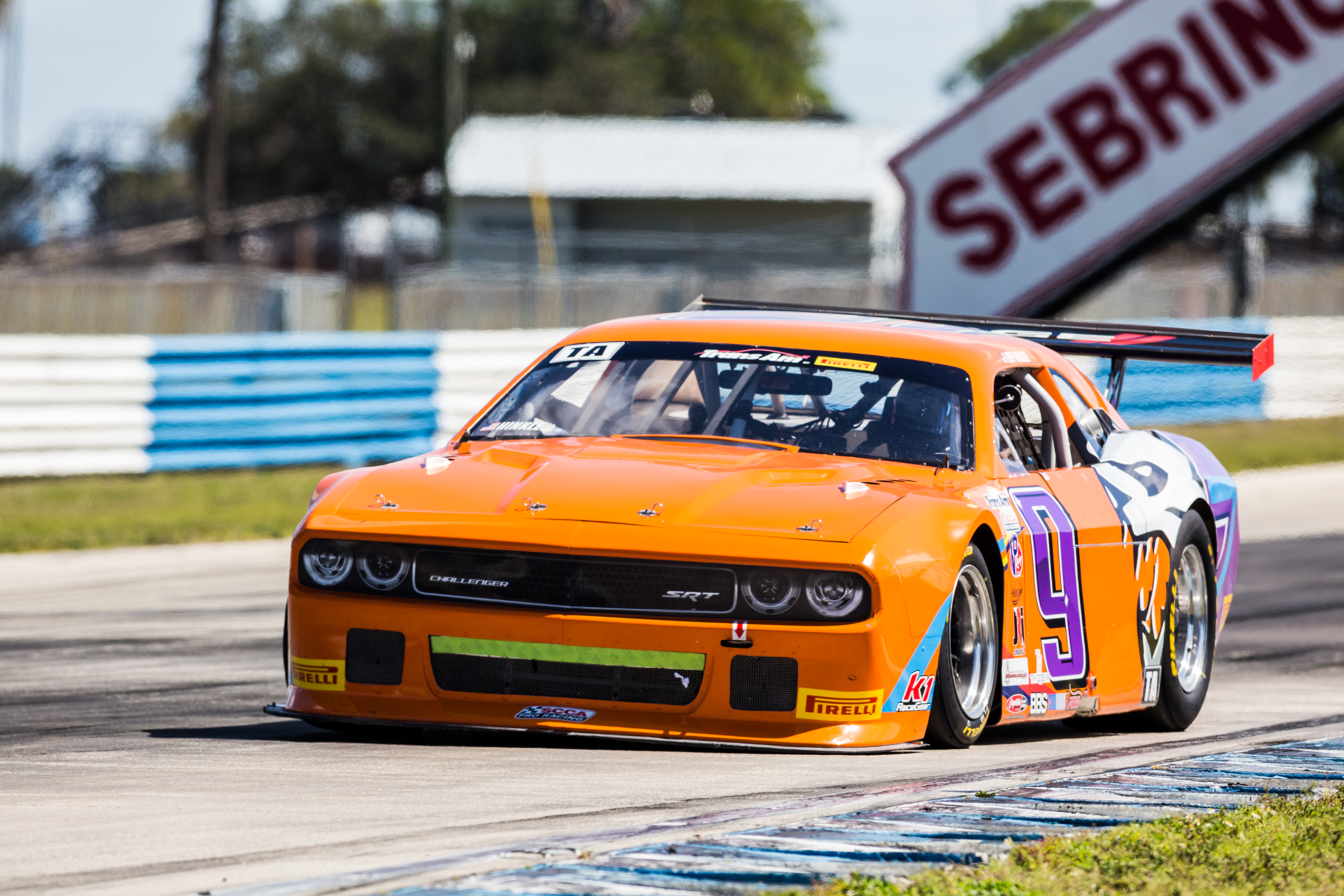
2017 Trans Am TA class Challenger at Sebring

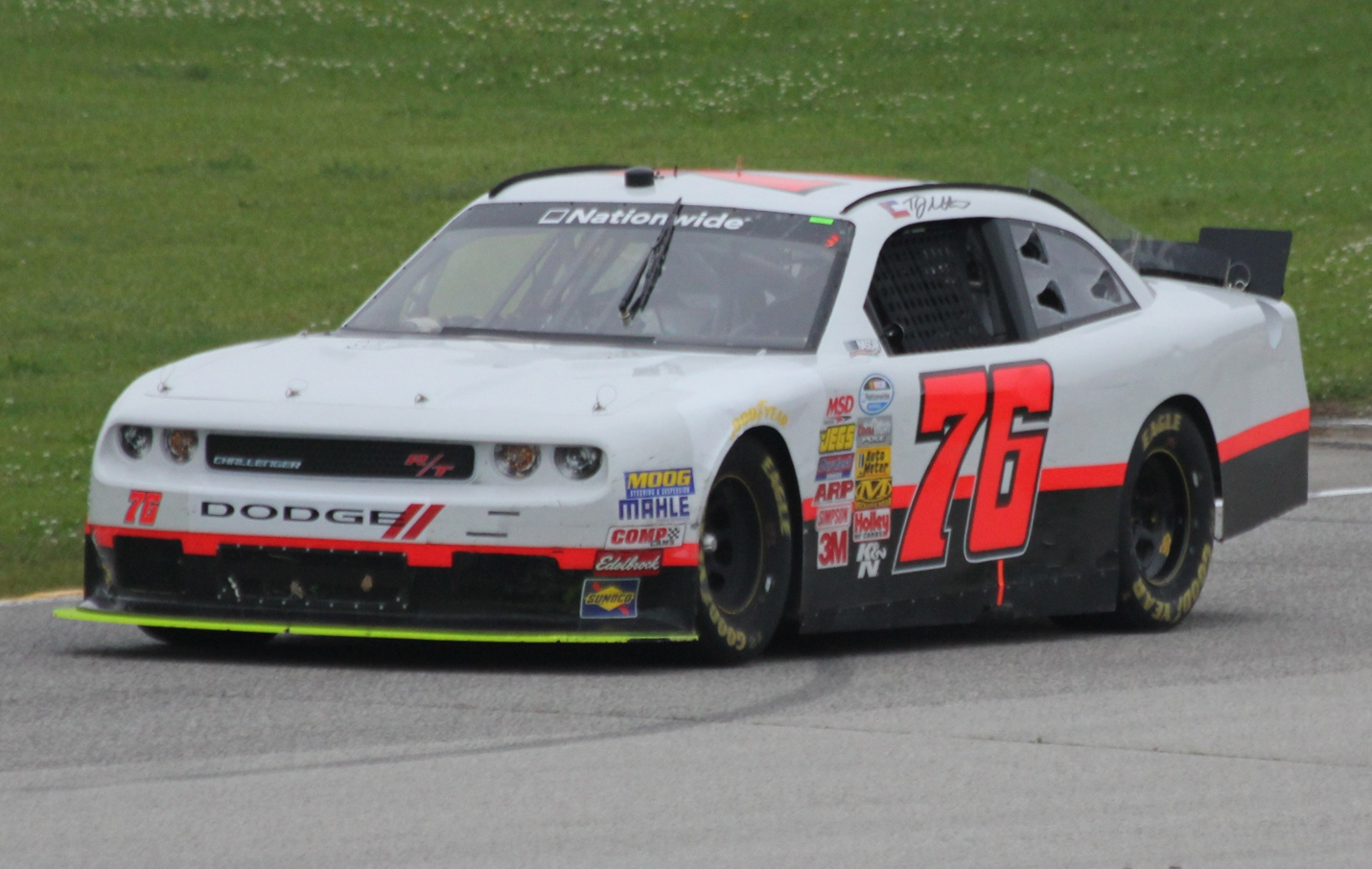
NASCAR Nationwide Series Challenger at Road America in 2014

The Challenger was introduced to the SCCA Trans Am Series in 1970. Two factory-backed cars were prepared by Ray Caldwell's Autodynamics and driven by Sam Posey and Tony Adamowicz. The No.77 car was built at Autodynamics from a street Challenger T/A taken from a local dealer showroom. The No.76 chassis arrived mid-season from Dan Gurney's All-American Racers and was completed by Autodynamics.

- Dodge's early to mid-1970s factory-supported "Kit Car" program for short-track late-model stock car racing offered a choice of Challenger, and a few (less than 12) were made. Still, in 1974, Dodge ended the Challenger line, and they went to the Dodge Dart Sports and Dodge Aspen bodies over a steel-tube chassis.
- Blackforest Motorsports has currently entered a Challenger in the Continental Challenge.
- The Challenger R/T has been used as the Chrysler model for starting in 2010 NASCAR Nationwide Series competition.

With Dodge officially out of NASCAR at the end of the 2012 season, the remaining cars and racing parts have been bought up by "privateer" racing teams and continue to show up in Nationwide Series during the 2013 and 2014 seasons. J. J. Yeley indicated his two-car team would continue to field a Challenger in the series for as long as he can find parts to keep the cars running. The team stopped after the 2014 season after his No. 93 (later No. 28) regularly ran in the top 20 during races. However, the Mike Harmon-owned No. 74, and the Derek White-operated No. 40 qualified and ran Dodges in 2015. Mike Harmon Racing ran a Dodge the entire season and also did so in 2016, and has raced in over half of the 2017 season so far. Likewise, White's MBM Motorsports team fielded the Nos. 13 and 40 as Dodges in some races. MBM continues to field Dodges into 2018 with Timmy Hill in the 66 (was the 13).

In late 2014, two Challengers fielded by Miller Racing with the support of SRT and Mopar, driven by Cameron Lawrence and Joe Stevens, started racing in the Trans-Am Series TA2 class. Both cars used a spec Howe road racing tube chassis with fiberglass bodies. Powered by a Hemi 392 slightly modified for road racing extremes and restricted by class rules, the cars made around 500 horsepower. Except for the slightly bulged fenders and a large rear wing, the cars look much like the stock/street version despite being roughly 7/8s the size of the road car. Lawrence won four of the twelve races in the 2015 season, finishing third overall in the Trans Am TA2 championship.

Joe Stevens in the No. 11 "Green Car" finished sixth overall after fourth place at the season finale at Daytona International Speedway. Joe Stevens also received the Cool Shirt Hard Charger award for his excellent rookie season performance. For the 2016 season, the Stevens-Miller Team fielded three Challengers in the TA2 series and ran in 16 events, scoring a few wins. The No. 77 car was painted in a throw-back scheme similar to the 1970 No. 77 car driven by Sam Posey. The No. 12 car occasionally fielded a blue scheme paying tribute to the Plymouth Cuda Trans-Am car driven by Swede Savage.

In March 2017, the Challenger returned to compete at Sebring after a nearly 40-year absence from Trans-Am's fastest racing class TA class in Tra. Jeff Hinkle drove it under the American V8 Road Racing team with John Debenedictis as crew chief. The car was orange and purple with stripes of many of the other challenger colors to celebrate the current stable of cars for the street. It is powered by a Penske Engines Mopar R5 / P7 carbureted engine producing 855 hp (638 kW). In its debut, it qualified 16th and finished 9th out of 24.

At all Superbike World Championship races in the United States, Fiat's Alfa Romeo safety car is replaced with Chrysler's Dodge Challenger.

== Discontinuation ==
On August 15, 2022, Stellantis formally announced that Dodge Challenger, Charger, and Chrysler 300 production would end following the 2023 model year, stating tightening U.S. EPA emissions requirements as reasons for doing so. In response, the company announced a series of seven "Last Call" models with special paint and unique trims to commemorate the Challenger and Charger's production. The final Dodge Challenger, a Pitch-Black Demon 170, rolled off the Brampton Assembly line on December 22, 2023; it was also the very last vehicle built on a derivative of the long-running Chrysler LX platform, which was introduced in 2004 for the 2005 model year. After production ended, the Brampton assembly plant was re-tooled to assemble the next-generation Jeep Compass.

The 2024 Dodge Charger lineup includes a three-door liftback, functionally replacing the Challenger.
